= 2020–21 Lori FC season =

Lori
2020–21 season
- Chairman: Tovmas Grigoryan
- Manager: Albert Solomonov
- Stadium: Vanadzor Football Academy
- Premier League: 8th
- Armenian Cup: First Round
- Top goalscorer: League: Claudir (3); All: Claudir (4)

The 2020–21 season was Lori FC's third and final season in the Armenian Premier League, and they also participated in the Armenian Cup. Lori submitted their resignation from the league in April, with the remaining games being awarded as 3-0 technical defeats, leaving Lori in 8th in the League at the end of the season, whilst they were also knocked out of the Armenian Cup by BKMA Yerevan in the First Round.

== Season events ==
On 4 August, Armen Sanamyan left his role as caretaker manager of Lori to become manager of Sevan. The following day, 5 August, Lori announced Albert Solomonov as their new head coach.

On 17 August, the Football Federation of Armenia announced that that day's match between Urartu and Lori would not take place as Lori still had players and staff in isolation following an outbreak of COVID-19.

On 20 August, Lori announced the signing of Arsen Yeghiazaryan from Urartu, and Manuel Vargas from Santos de Nasca, whilst Nana Antwi had returned from his loan spell with Lille B.

The following day, 21 August, Lori announced the signing of Timur Rudoselskiy from Kaisar, Aram Kocharyan from Gandzasar Kapan, and Almog Ohayon from Hapoel Petah Tikva.

On 22 August, Lori announced the signings of Vigen Avetisyan, Victor Cesar, Carlos Alberto Gutiérrez and Pavel Osipov.

On 24 August, the Football Federation of Armenia announced that that day's match between Van and Lori, and Lori's game against Gandzasar Kapan on 29 August had been postponed due to cases of COVID-19 within the Lori squad.

On 25 August, Lori announced the signing of Fernandinho from Cova da Piedade.

On 27 August, Vardan Shapperi moved to Ararat-Armenia.

On 28 August, Lori announced the singing of Karapet Manukyan from Lokomotiv Yerevan, and Arsen Siukayev from Tom Tomsk.

On 30 August, Lori announced the signing of Aleksandr Stepanov from Volgar Astrakhan.

On 31 August, Lori announced the signing of Muacir on a two-year contract from Amora.

On 2 September, Lori announced the signing of Hayk Sargsyan on a one-year contract, with the option of a second, from Lokomotiv Yerevan.

On 6 September, Lori announced the signing of Derenik Sargsyan to a two-year contract from Ararat-Armenia, and Artem Gomelko from Smolevichi to a one-year contract.

On 9 September, Lori announced the signing of Yevgeni Skoblikov on a one-year contract, from Belshina Bobruisk.

On 10 September, Lori announced the signings of Arman Asilyan from West Armenia, and Deou Dosa from Van.

On 11 September, Lori announced the signing of Naor Abudi to a one-year contract, with the option of a second, from Ashdod.

On 19 September, Lori announced the signing of Claudir to a one-year contract, with the option of a second, from Hapoel Ramat Gan Givatayim.

On 29 September, the season was suspended indefinitely due to the escalating 2020 Nagorno-Karabakh conflict. On 13 October, the FFA announced that the season would resume on 17 October.

On 15 October, Manuel Vargas left the club to return to Panama and sign with San Francisco.

On 17 October, Lori's match against Noah was postponed due to 7 positive COVID-19 cases within the Noah team. On the same day, Lori announced the singing of Ivan Božović to a one-year contract, with Pavel Kudryashov joining the next day on a similar contract.

On 13 January, Lori announced the departure of Hayk Sargsyan, Karapet Manukyan, Almog Ohayon, Deou Dosa, Naor Abudi, Anicet Oura, Pavel Kudryashov and Arsen Siukayev.

On 17 February, Lori announced the signing of Vardan Bakalyan, and Ghukas Poghosyan.

On 19 February, Lori announced the signings of Nemanja Šćekić, Luiz Matheus, Yevgeni Kirisov and Nikola Tripkovic.

On 24 February, Lori announced the signing of André Mensalão from Ferroviário.

On 2 March, Lori announced the signing of Nikola Popović from Metalac.

On 6 March, Lori announced the signing of Filip Kukuličić from Aluminij.

On 16 March, Lori walked off at the start of their match against Ararat Yerevan in protest of their Matchday 1 fixture being awarded to Urartu after Lori where unable to field a team due to COVID-19. With the match later being awarded to Ararat Yerevan 3–0.

On 5 April, Lori submitted their resignation from the 2020–21 Armenian Premier League.

== Squad ==
As of match played 8 March 2021

| Number | Name | Nationality | Position | Date of birth (age) | Signed from | Signed in | Contract ends | Apps. | Goals |
Goalkeepers
| 1 | Artem Gomelko | (Belarus) | GK | 8 December 1989 (age 36) | Smolevichi | 2020 | 2021 | 13 | 0 |
| 13 | David Davtyan | (Armenia) | GK | 27 July 2005 (age 21) | Youth team | 2020 | | 0 | 0 |
| 22 | Gor Manukyan | (Armenia) | GK | 27 September 1993 (age 32) | Alashkert | 2021 | | 0 | 0 |
| 32 | Nemanja Šćekić | (Montenegro) | GK | 17 December 1991 (age 34) | Žarkovo | 2021 | | 2 | 0 |
Defenders
| 2 | Nana Antwi | (Ghana) | DF | 10 August 2000 (age 26) | Accra Young Wise | 2018 | 2021 | 50 | 1 |
| 4 | Derenik Sargsyan | (Armenia) | DF | 13 October 1999 (age 26) | Ararat-Armenia | 2020 | 2021 | 0 | 0 |
| 5 | Djimy Alexis | (Haiti) | DF | 8 October 1997 (age 28) | AS Capoise | 2019 | 2021 | 38 | 2 |
| 8 | Aram Kocharyan | (Armenia) | DF | 5 March 1996 (age 30) | Gandzasar Kapan | 2020 | | 26 | 1 |
| 17 | Yevgeni Kirisov | (Russia) | DF | 14 February 1994 (age 32) | Belshina Bobruisk | 2021 | | 2 | 0 |
| 18 | Arsen Yeghiazaryan | (Armenia) | DF | 15 January 2000 (age 26) | Urartu | 2020 | | 2 | 0 |
| 19 | Ivan Božović | (Serbia) | DF | 25 May 1990 (age 36) | Balzan | 2020 | 2021 | 13 | 0 |
| 21 | Artur Avagyan | (Armenia) | DF | 4 July 1987 (age 39) | Banants | 2019 | 2021 | 31 | 1 |
| 25 | Timur Rudoselskiy | (Kazakhstan) | DF | 21 December 1994 (age 31) | Kaisar | 2020 | | 14 | 1 |
| 40 | Luiz Matheus | (Brazil) | DF | 10 January 1993 (age 33) | | 2021 | | 16 | 2 |
| 91 | Aleksandr Stepanov | (Russia) | DF | 5 June 1996 (age 30) | Volgar Astrakhan | 2020 | 2021 (+1) | 17 | 0 |
Midfielders
| 11 | Fernandinho | (Portugal) | MF | 21 February 1997 (age 29) | Cova da Piedade | 2020 | | 12 | 0 |
| 14 | Victor Cesar | (Brazil) | MF | 27 July 1999 (age 27) | Timon | 2020 | | 6 | 0 |
| 23 | Davit Paremuzyan | (Armenia) | MF | 2 March 2000 (age 26) | Banants II | 2020 | | 14 | 0 |
| 73 | Pavel Osipov | (Russia) | MF | 28 January 1996 (age 30) | Ventspils | 2020 | | 15 | 2 |
| 88 | André Mensalão | (Brazil) | MF | 21 June 1990 (age 36) | Ferroviário | 2021 | | 4 | 2 |
| 90 | Yevgeni Skoblikov | (Russia) | MF | 10 July 1990 (age 36) | Belshina Bobruisk | 2020 | 2021 | 17 | 1 |
| 94 | Nikola Popović | (Serbia) | MF | 31 May 1994 (age 32) | Metalac | 2021 | | 1 | 0 |
Forwards
| 7 | Ghukas Poghosyan | (Armenia) | FW | 6 February 1994 (age 32) | Alashkert | 2021 | | 4 | 1 |
| 9 | Nikola Tripkovic | (Serbia) | FW | 28 January 1998 (age 28) | Spartak Subotica | 2021 | | 5 | 1 |
| 10 | Vardan Bakalyan | (Armenia) | FW | 4 April 1995 (age 31) | Shirak | 2021 | | 5 | 0 |
| 28 | Claudir | (Brazil) | FW | 6 August 1992 (age 34) | Hapoel Ramat Gan Givatayim | 2020 | 2021 (+1) | 15 | 4 |
| 99 | Filip Kukuličić | (Montenegro) | FW | 13 February 1996 (age 30) | Aluminij | 2021 | | 0 | 0 |
Away on loan
Left during the season
| 3 | Hayk Sargsyan | (Armenia) | DF | 12 March 1998 (age 28) | Lokomotiv Yerevan | 2020 | 2021 (+1) | 0 | 0 |
| 6 | Manuel Vargas | (Panama) | MF | 19 January 1991 (age 35) | Santos de Nasca | 2020 | | 2 | 0 |
| 7 | Robert Minasyan | (Armenia) | FW | 8 April 1997 (age 29) | Pyunik | 2019 | | 22 | 2 |
| 9 | Karapet Manukyan | (Armenia) | MF | 25 July 1992 (age 34) | Lokomotiv Yerevan | 2020 | 2021 (+1) | 4 | 0 |
| 10 | Almog Ohayon | (Israel) | MF | 5 August 1994 (age 32) | Hapoel Petah Tikva | 2020 | | 9 | 2 |
| 13 | Vardan Shapperi | (Armenia) | GK | 13 March 1998 (age 28) | Pyunik | 2019 | 2021 | 19 | 0 |
| 15 | Deou Dosa | (Nigeria) | DF | 29 July 1998 (age 28) | Van | 2020 | | 40 | 0 |
| 17 | Naor Abudi | (Israel) | MF | 17 July 1993 (age 33) | Ashdod | 2020 | 2021 (+1) | 10 | 1 |
| 20 | Anicet Oura | (Ivory Coast) | FW | 7 December 1999 (age 26) | Africa Sports d'Abidjan | 2019 | 2021 | 14 | 0 |
| 22 | Carlos Alberto Gutiérrez | (Panama) | MF | 14 March 1995 (age 31) | | 2020 | | 0 | 0 |
| 26 | Sunday Ingbede | (Nigeria) | FW | 23 April 1998 (age 28) | Plateau United | 2018 | | 26 | 8 |
| 27 | Arman Asilyan | (Armenia) | DF | 15 April 1999 (age 27) | West Armenia | 2020 | | 0 | 0 |
| 40 | Muacir | (Portugal) | FW | 24 November 1995 (age 30) | Amora | 2020 | 2022 | 0 | 0 |
| 77 | Pavel Kudryashov | (Russia) | FW | 27 November 1996 (age 29) | Belshina Bobruisk | 2020 | 2021 | 4 | 0 |
| 88 | Arsen Siukayev | (Russia) | GK | 7 March 1996 (age 30) | Tom Tomsk | 2020 | 2021 (+1) | 18 | 0 |
| | Vigen Avetisyan | (Armenia) | MF | 12 January 1993 (age 33) | Noah | 2020 | | 33 | 12 |
| | Jose Luis Gamboa | (Colombia) | MF | 12 April 2000 (age 26) | Boca Juniors de Cali | 2020 | 2022 | 1 | 0 |
| | Enock Darko | (Ghana) | FW | 9 September 2000 (age 26) | Golden Kick | 2019 | 2022 | 20 | 0 |

== Transfers ==
=== In ===
| Date | Position | Nationality | Name | From | Fee | Ref. |
|---|---|---|---|---|---|---|
| Summer 2020 | MF | (Armenia) | Davit Paremuzyan | Urartu | Undisclosed | |
| 20 August 2020 | DF | (Armenia) | Arsen Yeghiazaryan | Urartu | Undisclosed | |
| 20 August 2020 | MF | (Panama) | Manuel Vargas | Santos de Nasca | Undisclosed | |
| 21 August 2020 | DF | (Armenia) | Aram Kocharyan | Gandzasar Kapan | Undisclosed | |
| 21 August 2020 | DF | (Kazakhstan) | Timur Rudoselskiy | Kaisar | Undisclosed | |
| 21 August 2020 | MF | (Israel) | Almog Ohayon | Hapoel Petah Tikva | Undisclosed | |
| 22 August 2020 | MF | (Armenia) | Vigen Avetisyan | Noah | Undisclosed | |
| 22 August 2020 | MF | (Brazil) | Victor Cesar | Timon | Undisclosed | |
| 22 August 2020 | MF | (Panama) | Carlos Alberto Gutiérrez | | Free | |
| 22 August 2020 | MF | (Russia) | Pavel Osipov | Ventspils | Undisclosed | |
| 25 August 2020 | MF | (Portugal) | Fernandinho | Cova da Piedade | Undisclosed | |
| 28 August 2020 | GK | (Russia) | Arsen Siukayev | Tom Tomsk | Undisclosed | |
| 28 August 2020 | MF | (Armenia) | Karapet Manukyan | Lokomotiv Yerevan | Undisclosed | |
| 30 August 2020 | DF | (Russia) | Aleksandr Stepanov | Volgar Astrakhan | Undisclosed | |
| 31 August 2020 | FW | (Portugal) | Muacir | Amora | Undisclosed | |
| 2 September 2020 | DF | (Armenia) | Hayk Sargsyan | Lokomotiv Yerevan | Undisclosed | |
| 6 September 2020 | GK | (Belarus) | Artem Gomelko | Smolevichi | Undisclosed | |
| 6 September 2020 | DF | (Armenia) | Derenik Sargsyan | Ararat-Armenia | Undisclosed | |
| 9 September 2020 | MF | (Russia) | Yevgeni Skoblikov | Belshina Bobruisk | Undisclosed | |
| 10 September 2020 | DF | (Armenia) | Arman Asilyan | West Armenia | Undisclosed | |
| 10 September 2020 | DF | (Nigeria) | Deou Dosa | Van | Undisclosed | |
| 11 August 2020 | MF | (Israel) | Naor Abudi | Ashdod | Undisclosed | |
| 19 August 2020 | FW | (Brazil) | Claudir | Hapoel Ramat Gan Givatayim | Undisclosed | |
| 17 October 2020 | DF | (Serbia) | Ivan Božović | Balzan | Free | |
| 18 October 2020 | FW | (Russia) | Pavel Kudryashov | Belshina Bobruisk | Undisclosed | |
| 17 February 2021 | FW | (Armenia) | Vardan Bakalyan | Shirak | Free | |
| 17 February 2021 | FW | (Armenia) | Ghukas Poghosyan | Alashkert | Free | |
| 18 February 2021 | GK | (Armenia) | Gor Manukyan | Alashkert | Undisclosed | |
| 19 February 2021 | GK | (Montenegro) | Nemanja Šćekić | Žarkovo | Undisclosed | |
| 19 February 2021 | DF | (Brazil) | Luiz Matheus | Unattached | Free | |
| 19 February 2021 | DF | (Russia) | Yevgeni Kirisov | Belshina Bobruisk | Undisclosed | |
| 19 February 2021 | FW | (Serbia) | Nikola Tripkovic | Spartak Subotica | Undisclosed | |
| 24 February 2021 | MF | (Brazil) | André Mensalão | Ferroviário | Undisclosed | |
| 2 March 2021 | MF | (Serbia) | Nikola Popović | Metalac | Undisclosed | |
| 6 March 2021 | FW | (Montenegro) | Filip Kukuličić | Aluminij | Undisclosed | |

=== Out ===
| Date | Position | Nationality | Name | From | Date to | Ref. |
|---|---|---|---|---|---|---|
| 26 July 2020 | DF | (Colombia) | Juan Bravo | Ararat Yerevan | Undisclosed | |
| 28 July 2020 | DF | (Spain) | Christian Jiménez | Ararat Yerevan | Undisclosed | |
| 5 August 2020 | FW | (Armenia) | David Ghandilyan | Van | Undisclosed | |
| 7 August 2020 | MF | (Nigeria) | Ugochukwu Iwu | Urartu | Undisclosed | |
| 8 August 2020 | FW | (Haiti) | Jonel Désiré | Urartu | Undisclosed | |
| 21 August 2020 | MF | (Nigeria) | Julius Ufuoma | Pyunik | Undisclosed | |
| 27 August 2020 | GK | (Armenia) | Vardan Shapperi | Ararat-Armenia | Undisclosed | |
| 29 August 2020 | FW | (Nigeria) | Sunday Ingbede | Alashkert | Undisclosed | |
| 11 September 2020 | MF | (Armenia) | Vigen Avetisyan | Alashkert | Undisclosed | |
| 15 October 2020 | MF | (Panama) | Manuel Vargas | San Francisco | Undisclosed | |
| 17 February 2021 | FW | (Armenia) | Robert Minasyan | Sevan | Undisclosed | |

=== Released ===
| Date | Position | Nationality | Name | Joined | Date | Ref |
|---|---|---|---|---|---|---|
| 31 August 2020 | MF | (Colombia) | Jose Luis Gamboa | | | |
| 31 August 2020 | FW | (Ghana) | Enock Darko | | | |
| 1 October 2020 | MF | (Panama) | Carlos Alberto Gutiérrez | | | |
| 13 January 2021 | GK | (Russia) | Arsen Siukayev | | | |
| 13 January 2021 | DF | (Armenia) | Hayk Sargsyan | | | |
| 13 January 2021 | DF | (Nigeria) | Deou Dosa | Van | 4 February 2021 | |
| 13 January 2021 | MF | (Armenia) | Karapet Manukyan | West Armenia | 13 January 2021 | |
| 13 January 2021 | MF | (Israel) | Naor Abudi | Hapoel Umm al-Fahm | 2 February 2021 | |
| 13 January 2021 | MF | (Israel) | Almog Ohayon | Shimshon Kfar Qasem | 8 February 2021 | |
| 13 January 2021 | FW | (Ivory Coast) | Anicet Oura | ASEC Mimosas | | |
| 13 January 2021 | FW | (Russia) | Pavel Kudryashov | Krymteplytsia Molodizhne | | |
| 26 January 2021 | MF | (Armenia) | Arman Asilyan | Noravank | 26 January 2021 | |

== Friendlies ==
| 8 August 2020 | Lori | 5 – 0 | Ararat-Armenia-2 | Vanadzor |
| (UTC+4) | Goal | Report | | Stadium: Vanadzor Football Academy |

| 10 October 2020 | Lori | 2 – 0 | Noravank | Vanadzor |
| 14:00 (UTC+4) | Claudir 2'; Victor Cesar 49' | Report | | Stadium: Vanadzor Football Academy |

| 30 January 2021 | Lori | 4 – 0 | Ararat Yerevan-2 | Vanadzor |
| (UTC+4) | Goal | Report | | Stadium: Vanadzor Football Academy |

| 4 February 2021 | Lori | 0 – 0 | Sevan | Vanadzor |
| (UTC+4) | | Report | | Stadium: Vanadzor Football Academy |

| 7 February 2021 | Armenia U19 | 1 – 3 | Lori | Yerevan |
| (UTC+4) | Goal | Report | Goal | Stadium: Avan Academy Stadium |

| 13 February 2021 | Van | 1 – 3 | Lori | Charentsavan |
| 14:00 (UTC+4) | G.Kirakosyan | Report | Goal | Stadium: Charentsavan City Stadium |

== Competitions ==
=== Premier League ===
==== Results summary ====
| Overall | | | | | | | | Home | | | | | | Away | | | | | |
| Pld | W | D | L | GF | GA | GD | Pts | W | D | L | GF | GA | GD | W | D | L | GF | GA | GD |
|---|---|---|---|---|---|---|---|---|---|---|---|---|---|---|---|---|---|---|---|
| 24 | 7 | 2 | 15 | 16 | 56 | −40 | 23 | 4 | 1 | 7 | 8 | 18 | −10 | 3 | 1 | 8 | 8 | 38 | −30 |

Last updated: 30 May 2021.
Source: See Results

==== Results by round ====
| Round | 1 | 2 | 3 | 4 | 5 | 6 | 7 | 8 | 9 | 10 | 11 | 12 | 13 | 14 | 15 | 16 | 17 | 18 | 19 | 20 | 21 | 22 | 23 | 24 |
|---|---|---|---|---|---|---|---|---|---|---|---|---|---|---|---|---|---|---|---|---|---|---|---|---|
| Ground | A | A | H | H | - | H | H | A | H | A | H | A | H | A | H | A | H | A | H | A | H | A | H | A |
| Result | L | W | L | W | - | W | D | W | L | D | W | W | L | L | W | L | L | L | L | L | L | L | L | L |
| Position | 10 | 5 | 7 | 7 | - | 3 | 3 | 3 | 5 | 5 | 3 | 3 | 3 | 3 | 8 | 8 | 8 | 8 | 8 | 8 | 8 | 8 | 8 | 8 |

Updated to match(es) played on 30 May 2021. Source: See Results
A = Away; H = Home; W = Win; D = Draw; L = Loss

==== Results ====
| 17 August 2020 1 | Urartu | 3 – 0 | Lori | Yerevan |
| 19:00 (UTC+4) | | Report | | Stadium: Urartu Stadium |
Note: Match postponed on 17 August, before being awarded to Urartu.

| 11 September 2020 4 | Ararat-Armenia | 1 – 2 | Lori | Yerevan |
| 19:15 (UTC+4) | Mailson (yellow card) 54'; Sanogo (yellow card) 57'; Otubanjo 90+5' (pen.) | Report | Abudi (yellow card) 15' (goal) 62'; Rudoselskiy 41' (yellow card) 45'; Fernandinho (yellow card) 65'; Stepanov (yellow card) 72'; Ohayon (red card) 90+3' | Stadium: Football Academy Stadium; Attendance: 0 Referee: Shahen Aghayan |
Note: Match played behind closed doors due to the COVID-19 pandemic.

| 15 September 2020 2 | Lori | 0 – 1 | Van | Vanadzor |
| 16:45 (UTC+4) | Alexis (yellow card) 5'; A.Avagyan (yellow card) 63'; Fernandinho (yellow card) 74'; Rudoselskiy (yellow card) 90+4' | Report | Ebert (yellow card) 12'; Tenyayev (yellow card) 51'; L.Ngavouka-Tseke (yellow card) 56'; E.Essien (yellow card) 65'; A.Petrosyan (yellow card) 73'; J.Gaba (yellow card) 88'; E.Movsesyan 90+2' (yellow card) 90+4' | Stadium: Vanadzor Football Academy; Attendance: 0 Referee: Henrik Nalbandyan |
Note: Match originally scheduled for 23 August, but postponed on 24 August. Match played behind closed doors due to the COVID-19 pandemic.

| 23 September 2020 5 | Lori | 1 – 0 | Pyunik | Vanadzor |
| 16:15 (UTC+4) | A.Avagyan (yellow card) 15'; Claudir 41'; Fernandinho (yellow card) 72'; Gomelko (yellow card) 89'; D.Paremuzyan (yellow card) 90+3' | Report | J.Ufuoma (yellow card) 34'; S.Grigoryan (yellow card) 37'; A.Arakelyan (yellow card) 49' (yellow-red card) 90+1' | Stadium: Vanadzor Football Academy; Attendance: 0 Referee: Zaven Hovhannisyan |
Note: Match played behind closed doors due to the COVID-19 pandemic.

| 22 October 2020 3 | Gandzasar Kapan | 1 – 0 | Lori | Yerevan |
| 16:30 (UTC+4) | Wbeymar 12' (pen.); V.Minasyan (yellow card) 40'; G.Meliksetyan (yellow card) 87' | Report | Alexis (yellow card) 11'; Fernandinho (yellow card) 34'; Rudoselskiy (yellow card) 38'; Božović (yellow card) 45' | Stadium: Football Academy Stadium; Attendance: 0 Referee: Zaven Hovhannisyan |
Note: Match originally scheduled for 29 August, but postponed on 24 August. Match played behind closed doors due to the COVID-19 pandemic.

| 26 October 2020 9 | Lori | 1 – 0 | Ararat Yerevan | Vanadzor |
| 15:30 (UTC+4) | A.Kocharyan (yellow card) 37'; Alexis 60'; Gomelko (yellow card) 77'; A.Yeghiazaryan (yellow card) 90' | Report | M.Kone (yellow card) 37'; Udo (yellow card) 54'; Spychka (yellow card) 70' | Stadium: Vanadzor Football Academy; Attendance: 0 Referee: Shahen Aghayan |
Note: Match played behind closed doors due to the COVID-19 pandemic.

| 29 October 2020 10 | Lori | 1 – 1 | Urartu | Vanadzor |
| 15:30 (UTC+4) | Alexis 16'; R.Minasyan (yellow card) 42' | Report | Désiré 2'; H. Hakobyan (yellow card) 45'; A.Mensah (yellow card) 60'; U.Iwu (yellow card) 81'; Osipov (yellow card) 83' | Stadium: Vanadzor Football Academy; Attendance: 0 Referee: Artem Gasparyan |
Note: Match played behind closed doors due to the COVID-19 pandemic.

| 4 November 2020 11 | Van | 1 – 2 | Lori | Charentsavan |
| 15:30 (UTC+4) | M.Petrosyan 37'; Tenyayev (yellow card) 90' | Report | A.Kocharyan (yellow card) 36'; Alexis (yellow card) 50'; Claudir 71', 80'; Antwi (yellow card) 90+2' | Stadium: Charentsavan City Stadium; Attendance: 0 Referee: Zaven Hovhannisyan |
Note: Match played behind closed doors due to the COVID-19 pandemic.

| 28 November 2020 13 | Lori | 0 – 1 | Ararat-Armenia | Vanadzor |
| 14:30 (UTC+4) | Stepanov (yellow card) 1'; Abudi (yellow card) 30'; Alexis (yellow card) 59' | Report | Alemão (yellow card) 26'; Martínez 56'; Bollo (yellow card) 85' | Stadium: Vanadzor Football Academy; Attendance: 0 Referee: Artur Safaryan |
Note: Match played behind closed doors due to the COVID-19 pandemic.

| 2 December 2020 14 | Pyunik | 1 – 1 | Lori | Yerevan |
| 17:30 (UTC+4) | A.Arakelyan (yellow card) 62'; Alfred 74'; A.Nahapetyan (yellow card) 80'; A.Avanesyan (yellow card) 84' | Report | Rudoselskiy (yellow card) 21'; Ohayon 46' | Stadium: Republican Stadium; Attendance: 0 Referee: Henrik Nalbandyan |
Note: Match played behind closed doors due to the COVID-19 pandemic.

| 8 December 2020 15 | Lori | 3 – 2 | Shirak | Vanadzor |
| 14:00 (UTC+4) | Osipov 17'; Ohayon 49'; A.Kocharyan 85'; Claudir (yellow card) 90+1' | Report | V.Bakalyan (yellow card) 38'; S.Urushanyan (yellow card) 45'; R.Mkrtchyan 48'; Mikaelyan 64' | Stadium: Vanadzor Football Academy; Attendance: 0 Referee: Shahen Aghayan |
Note: Match played behind closed doors due to the COVID-19 pandemic.

| 20 February 2021 6 | Shirak | 0 – 1 | Lori | Gyumri |
| 14:00 (UTC+4) | | Report | Rudoselskiy (yellow card) 25'; Claudir (yellow card) 48'; Skoblikov 90+2' | Stadium: Gyumri City Stadium; Attendance: 0 Referee: Shahen Aghayan |
Note: Match played behind closed doors due to the COVID-19 pandemic.

| 24 February 2021 7 | Lori | 0 – 1 | Alashkert | Vanadzor |
| 14:00 (UTC+4) | Stepanov (yellow card) 10'; A.Kocharyan (yellow card) 22'; Antwi (yellow card) 67' | Report | Grigoryan (yellow card) 21'; D.Davidyan (red card) 29'; N.Tankov 39'; Voskanyan (yellow card) 90+5' | Stadium: Vanadzor Football Academy; Attendance: 0 Referee: Artem Gasparyan |
Note: Match played behind closed doors due to the COVID-19 pandemic.

| 28 February 2021 16 | Alashkert | 2 – 1 | Lori | Yerevan |
| 14:00 (UTC+4) | N.Tankov 36'; Voskanyan (yellow card) 49'; Grigoryan (yellow card) 74' (goal) 79' | Report | A.Mensalão 40'; Stepanov (yellow card) 77'; D.Paremuzyan (yellow card) 80' | Stadium: Alashkert Stadium; Attendance: 100; Referee: Henrik Nalbandyan |

| 4 March 2021 17 | Lori | 2 – 0 | Noah | Vanadzor |
| 14:00 (UTC+4) | N.Tripkovic 12'; D.Paremuzyan (yellow card) 30'; A.Avagyan (yellow card) 38'; Alexis (yellow card) 61'; Božović (yellow card) 75'; Šćekić (yellow card) 83'; V.Bakalyan (yellow card) 84'; Poghosyan 90+2' | Report | Gareginyan (yellow card) 9'; Emsis (yellow card) 38'; S.Gomes (yellow card) 62'; Matviyenko (yellow card) 79' | Stadium: Vanadzor Football Academy; Attendance: 200; Referee: Zaven Hovhannisyan |

| 8 March 2021 8 | Noah | 3 – 1 | Lori | Yerevan |
| 15:00 (UTC+4) | Azarov 31' (pen.); Kovalenko (yellow card) 42'; Dedechko (yellow card) 45'; V.Vimercati (yellow card) 55'; Rudoselskiy 56' (o.g.); Monroy 66' (yellow card) 81' | Report | Antwi (yellow card) 33'; Alexis (yellow card) 38'; Poghosyan (yellow card) 45'; Claudir (yellow card) 45' (yellow-red card) 90+2'; Božović (yellow card) 69'; A.Mensalão 81' (yellow card) 88'; Stepanov (yellow card) 90' | Stadium: Alashkert Stadium; Attendance: 180; Referee: Henrik Nalbandyan |
Note: Match original scheduled for and postponed on 17 October due to a COVID-19 outbreak within the Noah team.

| 16 March 2021 18 | Ararat Yerevan | 3 – 0 | Lori | Yerevan |
| 18:00 (UTC+4) | | Report | | Stadium: Republican Stadium |
Note: Match abandoned after Lori walked off the pitch at the start of the game, and later awarded as a 3-0 technical victory to Ararat Yerevan.

| 13 April 2021 20 | Lori | 0 – 3 | Ararat-Armenia | Vanadzor |
| (UTC+4) | | | | Stadium: Vanadzor Football Academy |
Note: Match awarded 3-0 to Ararat-Armenia.

| 23 April 2021 21 | Shirak | 3 – 0 | Lori | Gyumri |
| (UTC+4) | | | | Stadium: Gyumri City Stadium |
Note: Match awarded 3-0 to Ararat-Armenia.

| 2 May 2021 22 | Lori | 0 – 3 | Urartu | Vanadzor |
| (UTC+4) | | | | Stadium: Vanadzor Football Academy |
Note: Match awarded 3-0 to Ararat-Armenia.

| 9 May 2021 23 | Noah | 3 – 0 | Lori | Yerevan |
| (UTC+4) | | | | Stadium: Alashkert Stadium |
Note: Match awarded 3-0 to Noah.

| 14 May 2021 26 | Lori | 0 – 3 | Pyunik | Vanadzor |
| (UTC+4) | | Report | | Stadium: Vanadzor Football Academy |
Note: Match awarded 3-0 to Pyunik.

| 18 May 2021 17 | Ararat Yerevan | 3 – 0 | Lori | Yerevan |
| 12:00 (UTC+4) | | | | Stadium: Republican Stadium |
Note: Match awarded as a 3-0 technical victory to Ararat Yerevan.

| 23 May 2021 26 | Lori | 0 – 3 | Alashkert | Vanadzor |
| 12:00 (UTC+4) | | Report | | Stadium: Vanadzor Football Academy |
Note: Match awarded 3-0 to Alashkert.

| 30 May 2021 26 | Van | 3 – 0 | Lori | Yerevan |
| 12:00 (UTC+4) | | Report | | Stadium: FFA Academy Stadium |
Note: Match awarded 3-0 to Van.

==== Table ====
| Pos | Team | Pld | W | D | L | GF | GA | GD | Pts | Qualification or relegation |
|---|---|---|---|---|---|---|---|---|---|---|
| 1 | Alashkert (C) | 24 | 13 | 7 | 4 | 25 | 15 | +10 | 46 | Qualification for the Champions League first qualifying round |
| 2 | Noah | 24 | 12 | 5 | 7 | 35 | 20 | +15 | 41 | Qualification for the Europa Conference League first qualifying round |
| 3 | Urartu | 24 | 12 | 5 | 7 | 28 | 19 | +9 | 41 | Qualification for the Europa Conference League first qualifying round |
| 4 | Ararat (Note: Ararat qualified for Europa Conference League first qualifying round as winners of 2020–21 Armenian Cup.) | 24 | 11 | 7 | 6 | 34 | 18 | +16 | 40 | Qualification for the Europa Conference League first qualifying round |
| 5 | Ararat-Armenia | 24 | 10 | 8 | 6 | 32 | 17 | +15 | 38 | |
| 6 | Van | 24 | 9 | 4 | 11 | 25 | 30 | −5 | 31 | |
| 7 | Pyunik | 24 | 6 | 7 | 11 | 20 | 18 | +2 | 25 | |
| 8 | Lori (Note: Round 19–27 matches involving Lori were all declared 3–0 forfeits in favor of the remaining 8 teams.) | 24 | 7 | 2 | 15 | 16 | 44 | −28 | 23 | |
| 9 | Shirak (R) | 24 | 2 | 7 | 15 | 19 | 53 | −34 | 13 | Relegation to First League |
| 10 | Gandzasar (R, D) | 0 | 0 | 0 | 0 | 0 | 0 | 0 | 0 | Club disqualified (Note: Gandzasar were excluded from the league On 3 November, Gandzasar Kapan announced that they were withdrawing from the League and Armenian Cup due to the ongoing financial constraints relating to the ongoing COVID-19 pandemic in Armenia and the 2020 Nagorno-Karabakh conflict.) |

Source: FFA Soccerway
Rules for classification: 1) Points; 2) Play-off (only if deciding champion); 3) Matches won; 4) Head-to-head points; 5) Head-to-head matches won; 6) Head-to-head goal difference; 7) Head-to-head goals scored; 8) Head-to-head away goals scored; 9) Goal difference; 10) Goals scored.
(C) Champions; (D) Disqualified; (R) Relegated

=== Armenian Cup ===
| 19 September 2020 First Round 1st leg | BKMA Yerevan | 0 – 0 | Lori | Yerevan |
| 16:30 (UTC+4) | N.Alaverdyan (yellow card) 51'; S.Sahradyan (yellow card) 67' | Report | | Stadium: Yerevan Football Academy Stadium; Attendance: 100; Referee: Artur Safaryan |

| 22 November 2020 First Round 2nd leg | Lori | 2 – 2 (a) | BKMA Yerevan | Vanadzor |
| 14:30 (UTC+4) | Osipov 2'; Božović (yellow card) 30'; Claudir 45' | Report | S.Mkrtchyan 48'; H.Ghevondyan 61'; A.Galstyan (yellow card) 89' | Stadium: Vanadzor Football Academy; Attendance: 0 Referee: Artem Gasparyan |

== Statistics ==
As of match played 8 March 2021

=== Appearances and goals ===
| No. | Pos | Nat | Player | Total | | Premier League | | Armenian Cup | |
| No. | Pos | Nat | Player | Apps | Goals | Apps | Goals | Apps | Goals |
|---|---|---|---|---|---|---|---|---|---|
| 1 | GK | (Belarus) BLR | Artem Gomelko | 13 | 0 | 13 | 0 | 0 | 0 |
| 2 | DF | (Ghana) GHA | Nana Antwi | 17 | 0 | 14+1 | 0 | 2 | 0 |
| 5 | DF | (Haiti) HAI | Djimy Alexis | 15 | 2 | 12+1 | 2 | 2 | 0 |
| 7 | FW | (Armenia) ARM | Ghukas Poghosyan | 4 | 1 | 1+3 | 1 | 0 | 0 |
| 8 | DF | (Armenia) ARM | Aram Kocharyan | 15 | 1 | 11+2 | 1 | 1+1 | 0 |
| 9 | FW | (Serbia) SRB | Nikola Tripkovic | 5 | 1 | 2+3 | 1 | 0 | 0 |
| 10 | FW | (Armenia) ARM | Vardan Bakalyan | 5 | 0 | 2+3 | 0 | 0 | 0 |
| 11 | MF | (Portugal) POR | Fernandinho | 12 | 0 | 8+3 | 0 | 0+1 | 0 |
| 14 | MF | (Brazil) BRA | Victor Cesar | 6 | 0 | 0+6 | 0 | 0 | 0 |
| 17 | DF | (Russia) RUS | Yevgeni Kirisov | 2 | 0 | 1+1 | 0 | 0 | 0 |
| 18 | DF | (Armenia) ARM | Arsen Yeghiazaryan | 2 | 0 | 1+1 | 0 | 0 | 0 |
| 19 | DF | (Serbia) SRB | Ivan Božović | 13 | 0 | 9+3 | 0 | 1 | 0 |
| 21 | DF | (Armenia) ARM | Artur Avagyan | 10 | 0 | 9 | 0 | 1 | 0 |
| 23 | MF | (Armenia) ARM | Davit Paremuzyan | 11 | 0 | 1+8 | 0 | 0+2 | 0 |
| 25 | DF | (Kazakhstan) KAZ | Timur Rudoselskiy | 13 | 1 | 12 | 1 | 1 | 0 |
| 28 | FW | (Brazil) BRA | Claudir | 15 | 4 | 12+1 | 3 | 1+1 | 1 |
| 32 | GK | (Montenegro) MNE | Nemanja Šćekić | 2 | 0 | 2 | 0 | 0 | 0 |
| 40 | DF | (Brazil) BRA | Luiz Matheus | 2 | 0 | 0+2 | 0 | 0 | 0 |
| 73 | MF | (Russia) RUS | Pavel Osipov | 15 | 2 | 7+6 | 1 | 1+1 | 1 |
| 88 | MF | (Brazil) BRA | André Mensalão | 4 | 2 | 3+1 | 2 | 0 | 0 |
| 90 | MF | (Russia) RUS | Yevgeni Skoblikov | 17 | 1 | 11+4 | 1 | 2 | 0 |
| 91 | DF | (Russia) RUS | Aleksandr Stepanov | 17 | 0 | 15 | 0 | 2 | 0 |
| 94 | MF | (Serbia) SRB | Nikola Popović | 1 | 0 | 0+1 | 0 | 0 | 0 |
Players away on loan:
Players who left Lori during the season:
| 7 | FW | (Armenia) ARM | Robert Minasyan | 7 | 0 | 3+3 | 0 | 1 | 0 |
| 6 | MF | (Panama) PAN | Manuel Vargas | 2 | 0 | 0+1 | 0 | 1 | 0 |
| 9 | MF | (Armenia) ARM | Karapet Manukyan | 4 | 0 | 3 | 0 | 1 | 0 |
| 10 | MF | (Israel) ISR | Almog Ohayon | 9 | 2 | 6+2 | 2 | 1 | 0 |
| 15 | DF | (Nigeria) NGR | Deou Dosa | 6 | 0 | 0+4 | 0 | 1+1 | 0 |
| 17 | MF | (Israel) ISR | Naor Abudi | 10 | 1 | 5+3 | 1 | 0+2 | 0 |
| 20 | FW | (Ivory Coast) CIV | Anicet Oura | 4 | 0 | 2+1 | 0 | 1 | 0 |
| 77 | FW | (Russia) RUS | Pavel Kudryashov | 4 | 0 | 0+3 | 0 | 0+1 | 0 |
| 88 | GK | (Russia) RUS | Arsen Siukayev | 2 | 0 | 0 | 0 | 2 | 0 |

=== Goal scorers ===
| Place | Position | Nation | Number | Name | Premier League | Armenian Cup | Total |
|---|---|---|---|---|---|---|---|
| 1 | FW | (Brazil) | 28 | Claudir | 3 | 1 | 4 |
| 2 | DF | (Haiti) | 5 | Djimy Alexis | 2 | 0 | 2 |
| 2 | MF | (Israel) | 10 | Almog Ohayon | 2 | 0 | 2 |
| 2 | MF | (Brazil) | 88 | André Mensalão | 2 | 0 | 2 |
| 2 | MF | (Russia) | 73 | Pavel Osipov | 1 | 1 | 2 |
| 6 | DF | (Kazakhstan) | 25 | Timur Rudoselskiy | 1 | 0 | 1 |
| 6 | MF | (Israel) | 17 | Naor Abudi | 1 | 0 | 1 |
| 6 | DF | (Armenia) | 8 | Aram Kocharyan | 1 | 0 | 1 |
| 6 | MF | (Russia) | 90 | Yevgeni Skoblikov | 1 | 0 | 1 |
| 6 | FW | (Serbia) | 9 | Nikola Tripkovic | 1 | 0 | 1 |
| 6 | FW | (Armenia) | 7 | Ghukas Poghosyan | 1 | 0 | 1 |
| | | | | TOTALS | 16 | 2 | 18 |

=== Clean sheets ===
| Place | Position | Nation | Number | Name | Premier League | Armenian Cup | Total |
|---|---|---|---|---|---|---|---|
| 1 | GK | (Belarus) | 1 | Artem Gomelko | 3 | 0 | 3 |
| 2 | GK | (Montenegro) | 32 | Nemanja Šćekić | 1 | 0 | 1 |
| 2 | GK | (Russia) | 88 | Arsen Siukayev | 0 | 1 | 1 |
| | | | | TOTALS | 4 | 1 | 5 |

=== Disciplinary record ===
| Number | Nation | Position | Name | Premier League | | Armenian Cup | | Total | |
| Number | Nation | Position | Name | Booked | Sent off (straight red) | Booked | Sent off (straight red) | Booked | Sent off (straight red) |
| 1 | (Belarus) | GK | Artem Gomelko | 2 | 0 | 0 | 0 | 2 | 0 |
| 2 | (Ghana) | DF | Nana Antwi | 3 | 0 | 0 | 0 | 3 | 0 |
| 5 | (Haiti) | DF | Djimy Alexis | 6 | 0 | 0 | 0 | 6 | 0 |
| 7 | (Armenia) | FW | Ghukas Poghosyan | 1 | 0 | 0 | 0 | 1 | 0 |
| 8 | (Armenia) | DF | Aram Kocharyan | 3 | 0 | 0 | 0 | 3 | 0 |
| 10 | (Armenia) | FW | Vardan Bakalyan | 1 | 0 | 0 | 0 | 1 | 0 |
| 11 | (Portugal) | MF | Fernandinho | 4 | 0 | 0 | 0 | 4 | 0 |
| 18 | (Armenia) | DF | Arsen Yeghiazaryan | 1 | 0 | 0 | 0 | 1 | 0 |
| 19 | (Serbia) | DF | Ivan Božović | 3 | 0 | 1 | 0 | 4 | 0 |
| 21 | (Armenia) | DF | Artur Avagyan | 3 | 0 | 0 | 0 | 3 | 0 |
| 23 | (Armenia) | MF | Davit Paremuzyan | 3 | 0 | 0 | 0 | 3 | 0 |
| 25 | (Kazakhstan) | DF | Timur Rudoselskiy | 5 | 0 | 0 | 0 | 5 | 0 |
| 28 | (Brazil) | FW | Claudir | 4 | 1 | 0 | 0 | 4 | 1 |
| 32 | (Montenegro) | GK | Nemanja Šćekić | 1 | 0 | 0 | 0 | 1 | 0 |
| 88 | (Brazil) | MF | André Mensalão | 1 | 0 | 0 | 0 | 1 | 0 |
| 91 | (Russia) | DF | Aleksandr Stepanov | 5 | 0 | 0 | 0 | 5 | 0 |
Players away on loan:
Players who left Lori during the season:
| 7 | (Armenia) | FW | Robert Minasyan | 1 | 0 | 0 | 0 | 1 | 0 |
| 10 | (Israel) | MF | Almog Ohayon | 0 | 1 | 0 | 0 | 0 | 1 |
| 17 | (Israel) | MF | Naor Abudi | 2 | 0 | 0 | 0 | 2 | 0 |
| | | | TOTALS | 49 | 2 | 1 | 0 | 50 | 2 |
