= List of Armenian football transfers winter 2020–21 =

This is a list of Armenian football transfers in the summer transfer window, by club. Only clubs of the 2020–21 Armenian Premier League Armenian Premier League are included.

== Armenian Premier League 2020–21 ==
=== Alashkert ===
In: Note: Flags indicate national team as defined under FIFA eligibility rules; some limited exceptions apply. Players may hold more than one non-FIFA nationality.

No.	Pos.	Nation	Player
1	GK	(Armenia) ARM	David Yurchenko (from (Kazakhstan) Shakhter Karagandy)
4	DF	(Serbia) SRB	Mihailo Jovanović (from (Malta) Valletta)
5	DF	(Ivory Coast) CIV	Didier Kadio (from (Sudan) Al-Hilal)
11	MF	(Armenia) ARM	Davit Minasyan (from (Armenia) Gandzasar Kapan)
16	MF	(France) FRA	Vincent Bezecourt (from (United States) Miami)
25	GK	(Armenia) ARM	Gevorg Kasparov (from (Armenia) Shirak)
27	FW	(Armenia) ARM	Mihran Manasyan (from (Armenia) Van)
33	DF	(Montenegro) MNE	Dejan Boljević (from (Kazakhstan) Taraz)
98	FW	(Serbia) SRB	Branko Mihajlović (from (Serbia) Mačva Šabac)
—	DF	(Armenia) ARM	Ashot Kocharyan (from (Armenia) Gandzasar Kapan)
—	DF	(Armenia) ARM	Vaspurak Minasyan (from (Armenia) Gandzasar Kapan)
—	DF	(North Macedonia) MKD	Risto Mitrevski

Out: Note: Flags indicate national team as defined under FIFA eligibility rules; some limited exceptions apply. Players may hold more than one non-FIFA nationality.

No.	Pos.	Nation	Player
1	GK	(Armenia) ARM	Gor Manukyan (to (Armenia) Lori)
11	MF	(Armenia) ARM	Vahagn Hayrapetyan
15	DF	(Brazil) BRA	Bryan (to (Kazakhstan) Atyrau)
16	DF	(Serbia) SRB	Marko Tomić (to (Serbia) Napredak Kruševac)
25	GK	(Montenegro) MNE	Andrija Dragojević (to (Montenegro) Dečić)
27	FW	(Armenia) ARM	Ghukas Poghosyan (to (Armenia) Lori)
33	DF	(Ukraine) UKR	Ihor Honchar (to (Armenia) Pyunik)
98	MF	(Armenia) ARM	Hayk Galstyan
—	DF	(North Macedonia) MKD	Risto Mitrevski (to (Malaysia) Sabah)
—	MF	(Armenia) ARM	Vigen Avetisyan

=== Ararat-Armenia ===
In: Note: Flags indicate national team as defined under FIFA eligibility rules; some limited exceptions apply. Players may hold more than one non-FIFA nationality.

No.	Pos.	Nation	Player
1	GK	(Serbia) SRB	Nikola Petrić (from (Serbia) Proleter Novi Sad)
7	MF	(Democratic Republic of the Congo) COD	Heradi Rashidi (from (Sweden) AIK)
16	MF	(Armenia) ARM	Wbeymar (from (Armenia) Gandzasar Kapan)
19	DF	(Colombia) COL	Junior Bueno (from (Colombia) Once Caldas)
22	DF	(Ukraine) UKR	Yehor Klymenchuk (from (Ukraine) Lviv)
55	DF	(Armenia) ARM	Davit Terteryan (from (Armenia) Gandzasar Kapan)
87	FW	(Armenia) ARM	Aleksandre Karapetian (from (Russia) Tambov)
94	MF	(Moldova) MDA	Dan Spătaru (from (Armenia) Noah)
—	MF	(Armenia) ARM	Armen Nahapetyan (loan return from (Armenia) Pyunik)

Out: Note: Flags indicate national team as defined under FIFA eligibility rules; some limited exceptions apply. Players may hold more than one non-FIFA nationality.

No.	Pos.	Nation	Player
11	MF	(Armenia) ARM	Hovhannes Harutyunyan (to (Armenia) Pyunik)
22	DF	(Armenia) ARM	Artur Danielyan (to (Armenia) Ararat Yerevan)
25	GK	(Serbia) SRB	Stefan Čupić (to (Cyprus) Olympiakos Nicosia)
67	MF	(Estonia) EST	Ilja Antonov (to (Estonia) Levadia)
93	DF	(Haiti) HAI	Alex Christian (to (Kazakhstan) Atyrau)
94	MF	(Cape Verde) CPV	Mailson Lima (to (United Arab Emirates) Dibba Al-Hisn)
99	FW	(Nigeria) NGA	Ogana Louis

=== Ararat Yerevan ===
In: Note: Flags indicate national team as defined under FIFA eligibility rules; some limited exceptions apply. Players may hold more than one non-FIFA nationality.

No.	Pos.	Nation	Player
22	DF	(Armenia) ARM	Artur Danielyan (from Ararat-Armenia)
33	GK	(Armenia) ARM	Grigor Meliksetyan (from (Armenia) Gandzasar Kapan)
55	MF	(Serbia) SRB	Dimitrije Pobulić (from (Serbia) Grafičar Beograd)
94	MF	(Ukraine) UKR	Maksym Zaderaka (from (Ukraine) Oleksandriya)

Out: Note: Flags indicate national team as defined under FIFA eligibility rules; some limited exceptions apply. Players may hold more than one non-FIFA nationality.

No.	Pos.	Nation	Player
4	DF	(Armenia) ARM	Vahe Muradyan
6	MF	(Armenia) ARM	Ruslan Avagyan (to West Armenia)
12	MF	(Armenia) ARM	Solomon Udo (to (Kazakhstan) Shakhter Karagandy)
22	MF	(Serbia) SRB	Igor Stanojević (to (Armenia) Shirak)
30	GK	(Serbia) SRB	Spasoje Stefanović (to (Armenia) Shirak)
—	DF	(Armenia) ARM	Robert Marutyan

=== Gandzasar Kapan ===
In: Note: Flags indicate national team as defined under FIFA eligibility rules; some limited exceptions apply. Players may hold more than one non-FIFA nationality.

No.	Pos.	Nation	Player

Out: Note: Flags indicate national team as defined under FIFA eligibility rules; some limited exceptions apply. Players may hold more than one non-FIFA nationality.

No.	Pos.	Nation	Player
2	DF	(Armenia) ARM	Hakob Hambardzumyan
3	DF	(Armenia) ARM	David Atayan
4	MF	(Armenia) ARM	Alen Tatintsyan
5	DF	(Armenia) ARM	Davit Terteryan (to Ararat-Armenia)
6	MF	(Armenia) ARM	Wbeymar (to Ararat-Armenia)
7	MF	(Nigeria) NGA	Joseph Adah (to (Kazakhstan) Shakhter Karagandy)
8	MF	(Armenia) ARM	Narek Aslanyan (to (Armenia) Sevan)
9	FW	(Armenia) ARM	Gevorg Nranyan
10	FW	(Brazil) BRA	Israel
11	MF	(Armenia) ARM	Ashot Adamyan (to (Armenia) Noah)
12	GK	(Armenia) ARM	Grigor Meliksetyan (to (Armenia) Ararat Yerevan)
13	GK	(Armenia) ARM	Arman Meliksetyan
16	GK	(Armenia) ARM	Mihran Hovhannisyan
17	FW	(Lithuania) LTU	Rokas Krusnauskas (to (Italy) Siena)
18	DF	(Armenia) ARM	Hayk Ishkhanyan (to (Armenia) Shirak)
19	DF	(Armenia) ARM	Vaspurak Minasyan (to (Armenia) Alashkert)
21	DF	(Armenia) ARM	Ashot Kocharyan (to (Armenia) Alashkert)
22	FW	(Armenia) ARM	Gegham Harutyunyan (to (Armenia) Noah)
27	MF	(Burkina Faso) BFA	Abdoul Zoko (to (Kenya) Gor Mahia)
28	DF	(Armenia) ARM	Alexander Hovhannisyan (to (Armenia) Van)
55	DF	(Portugal) POR	Diogo Coelho (to (Iceland) Vestri)
77	MF	(Armenia) ARM	Davit Minasyan (to (Armenia) Alashkert)
94	FW	(Armenia) ARM	Andranik Kocharyan (to (Armenia) Noravank)
96	MF	(Armenia) ARM	Edvard Avagyan

=== Lori ===
In: Note: Flags indicate national team as defined under FIFA eligibility rules; some limited exceptions apply. Players may hold more than one non-FIFA nationality.

No.	Pos.	Nation	Player
7	FW	(Armenia) ARM	Ghukas Poghosyan (to (Armenia) Alashkert)
9	FW	(Serbia) SRB	Nikola Tripkovic (from (Serbia) Spartak Subotica)
10	FW	(Armenia) ARM	Vardan Bakalyan (from (Armenia) Shirak)
17	DF	(Russia) RUS	Yevgeni Kirisov (from (Belarus) Belshina Bobruisk)
22	GK	(Armenia) ARM	Gor Manukyan (to (Armenia) Alashkert)
32	GK	(Montenegro) MNE	Nemanja Šćekić (from (Serbia) Žarkovo)
40	DF	(Brazil) BRA	Luiz Matheus
88	MF	(Brazil) BRA	André Mensalão (from (Brazil) Ferroviário)
94	MF	(Serbia) SRB	Nikola Popović (from (Serbia) Metalac)
99	FW	(Montenegro) MNE	Filip Kukuličić (from (Slovenia) Aluminij)

Out: Note: Flags indicate national team as defined under FIFA eligibility rules; some limited exceptions apply. Players may hold more than one non-FIFA nationality.

No.	Pos.	Nation	Player
3	DF	(Armenia) ARM	Hayk Sargsyan
7	FW	(Armenia) ARM	Robert Minasyan (to (Armenia) Sevan)
9	MF	(Armenia) ARM	Karapet Manukyan (to West Armenia)
10	MF	(Israel) ISR	Almog Ohayon (to (Israel) Shimshon Kfar Qasem)
15	DF	(Nigeria) NGA	Deou Dosa (to (Armenia) Van)
17	MF	(Israel) ISR	Naor Abudi (to (Israel) Hapoel Umm al-Fahm)
20	FW	(Ivory Coast) CIV	Anicet Oura (to (Ivory Coast) ASEC Mimosas)
27	DF	(Armenia) ARM	Arman Asilyan (to (Armenia) Noravank)
77	FW	(Russia) RUS	Pavel Kudryashov
88	GK	(Russia) RUS	Arsen Siukayev

=== Noah ===
In: Note: Flags indicate national team as defined under FIFA eligibility rules; some limited exceptions apply. Players may hold more than one non-FIFA nationality.

No.	Pos.	Nation	Player
11	FW	(Russia) RUS	Pavel Kireyenko (from (Russia) Tom Tomsk)
15	MF	(Russia) RUS	Yaroslav Matviyenko (from (Russia) Yenisey Krasnoyarsk)
19	MF	(Armenia) ARM	Ashot Adamyan (from (Armenia) Gandzasar Kapan)
21	MF	(Moldova) MDA	Vadim Paireli (from (Moldova) Sheriff Tiraspol)
22	FW	(Armenia) ARM	Gegham Harutyunyan (from (Armenia) Gandzasar Kapan)
27	DF	(Brazil) BRA	Jefferson Oliveira (from (Indonesia) Persik Kediri)
33	FW	(Russia) RUS	Andrei Titov (from (Russia) Akron Tolyatti)
65	FW	(Ghana) GHA	Raymond Gyasi (from (Kuwait) Kazma)
78	MF	(Russia) RUS	Maksim Danilin (loan from (Russia) Spartak Moscow)
88	MF	(Serbia) SRB	Dobrivoje Velemir (from (Serbia) OFK Bačka)
96	MF	(Armenia) ARM	Petros Avetisyan (from (Kazakhstan) Tobol)
—	GK	(Russia) RUS	Nikolay Novikov (from (Russia) Rodina Moscow)

Out: Note: Flags indicate national team as defined under FIFA eligibility rules; some limited exceptions apply. Players may hold more than one non-FIFA nationality.

No.	Pos.	Nation	Player
1	GK	(Russia) RUS	Maksim Shvagirev
6	DF	(Russia) RUS	Soslan Kagermazov (to (Latvia) Noah Jurmala)
11	MF	(Armenia) ARM	Artem Simonyan (to (Russia) Tom Tomsk)
15	FW	(Russia) RUS	Maksim Mayrovich (on loan to (Russia) Akron Tolyatti)
31	FW	(Russia) RUS	Dmitri Lavrishchev (to (Belarus) Lokomotiv Gomel)
57	MF	(Russia) RUS	Pavel Deobald (to (Kazakhstan) Turan)
94	MF	(Moldova) MDA	Dan Spătaru (to Ararat-Armenia)
—	DF	(Armenia) ARM	Vardan Movsisyan (Retired)

=== Pyunik ===
In: Note: Flags indicate national team as defined under FIFA eligibility rules; some limited exceptions apply. Players may hold more than one non-FIFA nationality.

No.	Pos.	Nation	Player
11	MF	(Armenia) ARM	Hovhannes Harutyunyan (from Ararat-Armenia)
24	FW	(Ukraine) UKR	Yevhen Budnik (from (Armenia) Urartu)
29	FW	(Ukraine) UKR	Oleh Kozhushko (from (Ukraine) Chornomorets Odesa)
69	DF	(Armenia) ARM	Robert Darbinyan (from (Armenia) Urartu)
70	FW	(Venezuela) VEN	José Balza (loan from (Venezuela) Deportivo La Guaira)
77	DF	(Ukraine) UKR	Ihor Honchar (from (Armenia) Alashkert)
80	MF	(Venezuela) VEN	Rommell Ibarra (loan from (Venezuela) Deportivo La Guaira)
88	MF	(Ukraine) UKR	Valeriy Boldenkov (from (Ukraine) Volyn Lutsk)
90	FW	(Venezuela) VEN	José Caraballo (from (Bolivia) Real Santa Cruz)
93	MF	(Brazil) BRA	Higor (from (Brazil) Botafogo da Paraíba)
94	GK	(Ukraine) UKR	Herman Penkov (from (Ukraine) Lviv)
95	DF	(Ukraine) UKR	Anton Bratkov (from (Ukraine) Metalist 1925 Kharkiv)
96	DF	(Armenia) ARM	Arman Hovhannisyan (from (Kazakhstan) Tobol)
99	FW	(Ukraine) UKR	Mykyta Tatarkov (from (Ukraine) Vorskla Poltava)

Out: Note: Flags indicate national team as defined under FIFA eligibility rules; some limited exceptions apply. Players may hold more than one non-FIFA nationality.

No.	Pos.	Nation	Player
15	DF	(Ivory Coast) CIV	Alexandre Yeoule
17	FW	(Armenia) ARM	Levon Vardanyan (on loan to (Armenia) BKMA Yerevan)
20	MF	(Ukraine) UKR	Artem Habelok (to (Ukraine) Metalist 1925 Kharkiv)
22	DF	(Armenia) ARM	Robert Hakobyan (to (Armenia) Shirak)
24	DF	(Rwanda) RWA	Salomon Nirisarike (to (Armenia) Urartu)
26	DF	(Armenia) ARM	Arsen Sargsyan
27	DF	(Armenia) ARM	Edmon Movsisyan (to West Armenia)
28	FW	(Armenia) ARM	Narek Hovhannisyan
29	FW	(Nigeria) NGA	Steven Alfred (to (Belarus) Slutsk)
77	MF	(Armenia) ARM	Armen Nahapetyan (loan return to Ararat-Armenia)
—	MF	(Armenia) ARM	Arthur Nadiryan (Retired)

=== Shirak ===
In: Note: Flags indicate national team as defined under FIFA eligibility rules; some limited exceptions apply. Players may hold more than one non-FIFA nationality.

No.	Pos.	Nation	Player
2	DF	(Armenia) ARM	Robert Hakobyan (from (Armenia) Pyunik)
19	FW	(Ivory Coast) CIV	Yacouba Silue (from (Ivory Coast) SO de l'Armée)
26	MF	(Serbia) SRB	Igor Stanojević (from (Armenia) Ararat Yerevan)
44	MF	(Armenia) ARM	Levon Darbinyan (loan return from (Armenia) BKMA Yerevan)
50	GK	(Serbia) SRB	Spasoje Stefanović (from (Armenia) Ararat Yerevan)
89	DF	(Armenia) ARM	Hayk Ishkhanyan (from (Armenia) Gandzasar Kapan)

Out: Note: Flags indicate national team as defined under FIFA eligibility rules; some limited exceptions apply. Players may hold more than one non-FIFA nationality.

No.	Pos.	Nation	Player
14	MF	(Armenia) ARM	Emil Yeghiazaryan
77	GK	(Armenia) ARM	Gevorg Kasparov (to (Armenia) Alashkert)
88	FW	(Armenia) ARM	Vardan Bakalyan (to (Armenia) Lori)

=== Urartu ===
In: Note: Flags indicate national team as defined under FIFA eligibility rules; some limited exceptions apply. Players may hold more than one non-FIFA nationality.

No.	Pos.	Nation	Player
8	FW	(Russia) RUS	Igor Paderin (out of retirement)
14	DF	(Russia) RUS	Pyotr Ten (from (Belarus) Minsk)
18	DF	(Rwanda) RWA	Salomon Nirisarike (from (Armenia) Pyunik)
22	FW	(Armenia) ARM	Artur Miranyan
67	DF	(Ukraine) UKR	Vadym Paramonov (from (Ukraine) Rukh Lviv)
99	FW	(Ukraine) UKR	Yevhen Budnik (from (Indonesia) Persita Tangerang)

Out: Note: Flags indicate national team as defined under FIFA eligibility rules; some limited exceptions apply. Players may hold more than one non-FIFA nationality.

No.	Pos.	Nation	Player
4	MF	(Ukraine) UKR	Pavlo Stepanets
8	MF	(Russia) RUS	Maksim Mashnev (to (Russia) Tyumen)
15	DF	(Russia) RUS	Dmitry Guz (to (Kazakhstan) Atyrau)
18	FW	(Russia) RUS	Aleksandr Radchenko (to (Russia) Dynamo Bryansk)
19	DF	(Russia) RUS	Yevgeni Osipov
99	DF	(Armenia) ARM	Robert Darbinyan (to (Armenia) Pyunik)
99	FW	(Ukraine) UKR	Yevhen Budnik (to (Armenia) Pyunik)
—	MF	(Nigeria) NGA	Joseph Sunday (to (Nigeria) Akwa United)

=== Van ===
In: Note: Flags indicate national team as defined under FIFA eligibility rules; some limited exceptions apply. Players may hold more than one non-FIFA nationality.

No.	Pos.	Nation	Player
7	MF	(Russia) RUS	Vladislav Vasilyev (from (Russia) Spartak-2 Moscow)
11	MF	(Russia) RUS	Maxim Zestarev (from (Russia) Ural Yekaterinburg)
14	MF	(Russia) RUS	Pavel Korkin
15	DF	(Nigeria) NGA	Deou Dosa (from (Armenia) Lori)
22	FW	(Armenia) ARM	Viulen Ayvazyan (from (Armenia) Sevan)
23	DF	(Armenia) ARM	Alexander Hovhannisyan (from (Armenia) Gandzasar Kapan)
28	DF	(Russia) RUS	Rustam Isayev (from (Russia) Makhachkala)
33	GK	(Russia) RUS	David Papikyan (from (Armenia) Torpedo Yerevan)
63	FW	(Russia) RUS	Aleksandr Maksimenko (from (Russia) SKA-Khabarovsk)
88	MF	(Russia) RUS	Aleksey Shishkin

Out: Note: Flags indicate national team as defined under FIFA eligibility rules; some limited exceptions apply. Players may hold more than one non-FIFA nationality.

No.	Pos.	Nation	Player
4	MF	(Ivory Coast) CIV	Media Traore
7	DF	(Brazil) BRA	Ebert
8	DF	(Armenia) ARM	Davit Ayvazyan (to (Armenia) Sevan)
9	FW	(Armenia) ARM	Mihran Manasyan (to (Armenia) Alashkert)
11	FW	(Armenia) ARM	David Ghandilyan (to (Armenia) Noravank)
13	MF	(Russia) RUS	Stanislav Yefimov (to (Finland) Ekenäs)
14	DF	(Armenia) ARM	Arman Khachatryan (to (Armenia) Noravank)
21	MF	(Russia) RUS	Muslim Bammatgereev (to (Russia) Krasny)
22	DF	(Ivory Coast) CIV	Michael Gnolou
25	FW	(Armenia) ARM	Orbeli Hambardzumyan
33	GK	(Armenia) ARM	Ashot Ayvazyan
88	MF	(Armenia) ARM	Mihran Petrosyan
91	MF	(Republic of the Congo) CGO	Lie Pato Ngavouka-Tseke
