= List of Armenian football transfers summer 2020 =

This is a list of Armenian football transfers in the summer transfer window, by club. Only clubs of the 2020–21 Armenian Premier League Armenian Premier League are included.

== Armenian Premier League 2020-21 ==
=== Alashkert ===
In: Note: Flags indicate national team as defined under FIFA eligibility rules; some limited exceptions apply. Players may hold more than one non-FIFA nationality.

No.	Pos.	Nation	Player
9	MF	ARM	Rumyan Hovsepyan (from (Bulgaria) Arda Kardzhali)
33	DF	UKR	Ihor Honchar (from (Ukraine) Lviv)
77	FW	ARM	Grigor Aghekyan (from (Armenia) Gandzasar Kapan)
88	FW	BRA	Perdigão
94	MF	ARM	Aghvan Papikyan (from (Poland) Chojniczanka Chojnice)
97	MF	RUS	David Davidyan (from (Armenia) Ararat Yerevan)
—	MF	ARM	Vigen Avetisyan (from (Armenia) Lori)

Out: Note: Flags indicate national team as defined under FIFA eligibility rules; some limited exceptions apply. Players may hold more than one non-FIFA nationality.

No.	Pos.	Nation	Player
1	GK	ARM	Henri Avagyan (to (Armenia) Van)
2	DF	SRB	Aleksandar Miljković (to (Serbia) Partizan)
5	DF	EST	Nikita Baranov (to (Cyprus) Karmiotissa)
13	DF	MDA	Victor Mudrac (to (Belarus) Slavia Mozyr)
22	DF	ARM	Hayk Ishkhanyan (to (Armenia) Gandzasar Kapan)
77	FW	ARM	Edgar Manucharyan (Retired)
94	MF	ARM	Aghvan Papikyan (to (Armenia) Ararat Yerevan)
96	FW	ARM	Eduard Avagyan (to (Armenia) Gandzasar Kapan)

=== Ararat-Armenia ===
In: Note: Flags indicate national team as defined under FIFA eligibility rules; some limited exceptions apply. Players may hold more than one non-FIFA nationality.

No.	Pos.	Nation	Player
2	DF	BRA	Alemão (from (Portugal) Oliveirense)
5	MF	ARM	Sargis Shahinyan (from (Armenia) Lori)
6	MF	ESP	David Bollo (from (Romania) Academica Clinceni)
9	FW	PER	Jeisson Martínez (from (Spain) Fuenlabrada)
13	GK	ARM	Vardan Shapperi (from (Armenia) Lori)

Out: Note: Flags indicate national team as defined under FIFA eligibility rules; some limited exceptions apply. Players may hold more than one non-FIFA nationality.

No.	Pos.	Nation	Player
1	GK	ARM	Suren Aloyan
7	MF	ARM	Armen Nahapetyan (on loan to (Armenia) Pyunik)
8	MF	ARM	Gor Malakyan (to (Armenia) Pyunik)
15	DF	RUS	Dmitry Guz (to (Armenia) Urartu)
19	FW	RUS	Artyom Avanesyan (on loan to (Armenia) Pyunik)
20	DF	MAR	Rochdi Achenteh
25	MF	ARM	Davit Nalbandyan (on loan to (Armenia) Van)
32	FW	RUS	Anton Kobyalko (to (Armenia) Pyunik)
—	MF	ARM	Arman Khachatryan (to (Armenia) Van, previously on loan)
—	FW	CIV	Jean-Jacques Bougouhi (to (Iraq) Al-Mina'a)

=== Ararat Yerevan ===
In: Note: Flags indicate national team as defined under FIFA eligibility rules; some limited exceptions apply. Players may hold more than one non-FIFA nationality.

No.	Pos.	Nation	Player
1	GK	RUS	Vsevolod Yermakov (from (Armenia) Shirak)
2	DF	ESP	Christian Jiménez (from (Armenia) Lori)
4	MF	SRB	Igor Stanojević (from (Serbia) Mačva Šabac)
8	DF	ARM	Zhirayr Margaryan (from (Armenia) Shirak)
11	MF	ARM	David Manoyan (from (Armenia) Shirak)
12	MF	NGA	Solomon Udo (from (Armenia) Shirak)
14	MF	ARM	Artak Yedigaryan (from (Armenia) Pyunik)
15	FW	SRB	Uroš Nenadović (from (Armenia) Shirak)
18	MF	ARM	Edgar Malakyan (from (Armenia) Shirak)
19	MF	ARM	Karen Muradyan (from (Armenia) Shirak)
20	DF	SRB	Marko Prljević (from (Armenia) Shirak)
25	DF	ARM	Hrayr Mkoyan (from (Armenia) Shirak)
30	GK	SRB	Spasoje Stefanović (from (Serbia) Sinđelić Beograd)
80	DF	COL	Juan Bravo (from (Armenia) Lori)
—	MF	ARM	Aghvan Papikyan (from (Armenia) Alashkert)

Out: Note: Flags indicate national team as defined under FIFA eligibility rules; some limited exceptions apply. Players may hold more than one non-FIFA nationality.

No.	Pos.	Nation	Player
2	DF	BRA	Sidney (loan return to (Ukraine) Rukh Lviv)
3	DF	BRA	João Victor (loan return to (Brazil) XV de Novembro)
5	MF	GEO	Zurab Arziani
4	DF	RUS	Arkadi Kalaydzhyan
8	MF	ARM	Albert Mnatsakanyan
9	FW	RUS	Georgy Chelidze
11	FW	RUS	Ramazan Isayev (to (Russia) Legion Dynamo Makhachkala)
12	GK	RUS	Yevgeni Kobozev
17	FW	POR	Sancidino Silva
21	FW	ARM	Emmanuel Odemis
29	MF	ARM	Petros Afajanyan (to (Armenia) Shirak)
30	FW	NGA	Ganiyu Oseni (to (Kuwait) Kazma)
32	MF	UKR	Pavlo Stepanets (to (Armenia) Urartu)
34	DF	RUS	Yevgeni Makeyev
36	DF	BRA	Rafinha
37	FW	RUS	Dmitri Ryzhov
45	DF	FRA	Thomas Phibel
66	DF	RUS	Konstantin Morozov (to (Russia) Akron Tolyatti)
69	MF	UKR	Denys Dedechko (to (Armenia) Noah)
70	MF	NGA	Lukman Haruna
77	MF	BRA	Vitinho (to (Armenia) Urartu)
80	FW	BRA	Igor Aguiar (loan return to (Brazil) XV de Novembro)
88	DF	BRA	James (to (Armenia) Urartu)
90	FW	BRA	Weslen Junior (loan return to (Brazil) XV de Novembro)
94	FW	ARM	David Arshakyan
97	MF	RUS	David Davidyan (to (Armenia) Alashkert)
—	DF	ARM	Derenik Sargsyan (to (Armenia) Lori)

=== Gandzasar Kapan ===
In: Note: Flags indicate national team as defined under FIFA eligibility rules; some limited exceptions apply. Players may hold more than one non-FIFA nationality.

No.	Pos.	Nation	Player
7	MF	NGA	Joseph Adah (from (Armenia) Pyunik)
10	FW	BRA	Israel Junior (from (Brazil) Atlético Tubarão)
17	FW	LTU	Rokas Krusnauskas (from (Armenia) Noah)
18	DF	ARM	Hayk Ishkhanyan (from (Armenia) Alashkert)
55	DF	POR	Diogo Coelho (from (Armenia) Lori)
—	MF	ARM	Eduard Avagyan (from (Armenia) Alashkert)

Out: Note: Flags indicate national team as defined under FIFA eligibility rules; some limited exceptions apply. Players may hold more than one non-FIFA nationality.

No.	Pos.	Nation	Player
1	GK	ARM	Gevorg Kasparov (to (Armenia) Shirak)
3	DF	ARM	Hamlet Asoyan (to (Armenia) Sevan)
7	FW	ARM	Vardan Pogosyan
14	MF	ARM	Emil Yeghiazaryan (to (Armenia) Shirak)
15	DF	GHA	Annan Mensah (loan return to (Armenia) Lori)
17	FW	ARM	Grigor Aghekyan (to (Armenia) Alashkert)
20	MF	ARM	Artur Grigoryan (to (Armenia) Pyunik)
65	MF	BRA	Juninho
—	DF	ARM	Aram Kocharyan (to (Armenia) Lori)

=== Lori ===
In: Note: Flags indicate national team as defined under FIFA eligibility rules; some limited exceptions apply. Players may hold more than one non-FIFA nationality.

No.	Pos.	Nation	Player
1	GK	BLR	Artem Gomelko (from (Belarus) Smolevichi)
2	DF	GHA	Nana Antwi (loan return from (France) Lille)
3	DF	ARM	Hayk Sargsyan (from (Armenia) Lokomotiv Yerevan)
4	DF	ARM	Derenik Sargsyan (from Ararat-Armenia)
6	MF	PAN	Manuel Vargas (from (Peru) Santos de Nasca)
8	DF	ARM	Aram Kocharyan (from (Armenia) Gandzasar Kapan)
9	MF	ARM	Karapet Manukyan (from (Armenia) Lokomotiv Yerevan)
10	MF	ISR	Almog Ohayon (from (Israel) Hapoel Petah Tikva)
11	MF	POR	Fernandinho (from (Portugal) Cova da Piedade)
14	MF	BRA	Victor Cesar (from (Brazil) Timon)
15	DF	NGA	Deou Dosa (from (Armenia) Van)
16	DF	ARM	Arsen Yeghiazaryan (from (Armenia) Urartu)
17	MF	ISR	Naor Abudi (from (Israel) Ashdod)
22	MF	PAN	Carlos Alberto Gutiérrez
23	MF	ARM	Davit Paremuzyan (from (Armenia) Urartu)
25	DF	KAZ	Timur Rudoselskiy (from (Kazakhstan) Kaisar)
27	DF	ARM	Arman Asilyan (from West Armenia)
28	FW	BRA	Claudir (from (Israel) Hapoel Ramat Gan Givatayim)
40	FW	POR	Muacir (from (Portugal) Amora)
73	MF	RUS	Pavel Osipov (from (Latvia) Ventspils)
88	GK	RUS	Arsen Siukayev (from (Russia) Tom Tomsk)
90	MF	RUS	Yevgeni Skoblikov (from (Belarus) Belshina Bobruisk)
91	DF	RUS	Aleksandr Stepanov (from (Russia) Volgar Astrakhan)
—	FW	GHA	Darko Enock (loan return from (Armenia) Sevan)
—	MF	ARM	Vigen Avetisyan (from (Armenia) Noah)

Out: Note: Flags indicate national team as defined under FIFA eligibility rules; some limited exceptions apply. Players may hold more than one non-FIFA nationality.

No.	Pos.	Nation	Player
1	GK	POR	Mickaël Meira
4	DF	BRA	Luiz Matheus
5	MF	NGA	Julius Ufuoma (to (Armenia) Pyunik)
6	DF	GHA	Annan Mensah (to (Armenia) Urartu, previously on loan to (Armenia) Gandzasar Kapan)
8	MF	ARM	Sargis Shahinyan (to Ararat-Armenia)
9	FW	ARG	Agustín Maziero
10	FW	HAI	Jonel Désiré (to (Armenia) Urartu)
11	FW	ARM	David Ghandilyan (to (Armenia) Van)
13	GK	ARM	Vardan Shapperi (to Ararat-Armenia)
16	FW	ESP	Xabier Auzmendi
17	DF	URU	Gianni Rodríguez
19	MF	NGA	Uguchukwu Iwu (to (Armenia) Urartu)
23	MF	ARM	Davit Paremuzyan (loan return to (Armenia) Urartu)
24	DF	CIV	Alexandre Yeoule (to (Armenia) Pyunik)
26	FW	NGA	Sunday Ingbede (released, previously on loan to (Armenia) Alashkert)
27	DF	ESP	Christian Jiménez (to (Armenia) Ararat Yerevan)
28	MF	RUS	Ruslan Zayerko
29	FW	ARM	Mihran Manasyan (to (Armenia) Van)
31	GK	ESP	Diego Barrios
44	DF	COL	Juan Bravo (to (Armenia) Ararat Yerevan)
55	DF	POR	Diogo Coelho (to (Armenia) Gandzasar Kapan)
99	DF	ARM	Arman Mkrtchyan (to (Armenia) Noah)
—	DF	AUT	Tode Đaković
—	MF	ARM	Vigen Avetisyan (to (Armenia) Alashkert)
—	MF	COL	Jose Luis Gamboa
—	MF	ESP	Yeray Jiménez

=== Noah ===
In: Note: Flags indicate national team as defined under FIFA eligibility rules; some limited exceptions apply. Players may hold more than one non-FIFA nationality.

No.	Pos.	Nation	Player
2	DF	ARM	Vardan Shakhbazyan (from (Armenia) Shirak)
4	DF	ARM	Jordy Monroy (from (Colombia) Boyacá Chicó)
11	MF	ARM	Artem Simonyan (from (Armenia) Pyunik)
13	GK	ARM	Samvel Hunanyan (from (Armenia) Dilijan)
17	MF	RUS	Nikita Dubchak (from (Russia) Olimp Khimki)
23	DF	ARM	Artur Stepanyan (loan return from (Armenia) Van)
69	MF	UKR	Denys Dedechko (from (Armenia) Ararat Yerevan)
99	DF	ARM	Arman Mkrtchyan (from (Armenia) Lori)
—	MF	POR	Alex Oliveira (from (Portugal) União de Leiria)

Out: Note: Flags indicate national team as defined under FIFA eligibility rules; some limited exceptions apply. Players may hold more than one non-FIFA nationality.

No.	Pos.	Nation	Player
2	DF	RUS	Vitali Zaprudskikh
11	MF	ARM	Vigen Avetisyan (to (Armenia) Lori)
20	MF	ARM	Edgar Grigoryan (loan return to (Armenia) Urartu)
21	FW	LTU	Rokas Krusnauskas (to (Armenia) Gandzasar Kapan)
24	MF	RUS	Sergey Dmitriev (to (Russia) Kolomna)
28	GK	ARM	Artem Delinyan (to (Russia) Kuban-Holding Pavlovskaya)
33	DF	ARM	Hovhannes Nazaryan (to (Armenia) Shirak)

=== Pyunik ===
In: Note: Flags indicate national team as defined under FIFA eligibility rules; some limited exceptions apply. Players may hold more than one non-FIFA nationality.

No.	Pos.	Nation	Player
5	MF	NGA	Julius Ufuoma (from (Armenia) Lori)
8	MF	ARM	Gor Malakyan (from Ararat-Armenia)
9	FW	RUS	Anton Kobyalko (from Ararat-Armenia)
10	MF	ARM	Artur Grigoryan (from (Armenia) Gandzasar Kapan)
12	MF	NGA	Muhammad Ladan (loan from (Russia) Sochi)
13	MF	BFA	Dramane Salou (from (Belarus) Slutsk)
15	DF	CIV	Alexandre Yeoule (from (Armenia) Lori)
19	FW	RUS	Artyom Avanesyan (on loan from Ararat-Armenia)
20	MF	UKR	Artem Habelok (from (Ukraine) Vorskla Poltava)
25	DF	RUS	Magomed Musalov (from (Russia) Akhmat Grozny)
71	GK	RUS	Stanislav Buchnev (from (Russia) Fakel Voronezh)
77	MF	ARM	Armen Nahapetyan (on loan from Ararat-Armenia)

Out: Note: Flags indicate national team as defined under FIFA eligibility rules; some limited exceptions apply. Players may hold more than one non-FIFA nationality.

No.	Pos.	Nation	Player
4	DF	RUS	Anton Belov (to (Russia) Tom Tomsk)
5	DF	ARM	Armen Manucharyan (to (Russia) Rotor Volgograd)
6	MF	ARM	Karlen Mkrtchyan
7	MF	ARM	Artem Simonyan (to (Armenia) Noah)
8	DF	MKD	Antonio Stankov
9	FW	ARM	Artur Miranyan
11	DF	COD	Guy Magema
17	MF	ARM	Artak Yedigaryan (to (Armenia) Ararat Yerevan)
20	MF	NGA	Uguchukwu Iwu (loan return to (Armenia) Lori)
25	GK	MNE	Andrija Dragojević
31	GK	RUS	Vladimir Sugrobov (loan return to (Russia) Tambov)
42	FW	NGA	Steven Alfred (loan return to (Russia) Sochi)
63	DF	ALB	Kristi Marku
65	MF	RUS	Dmitri Malyaka (to (Armenia) Lernayin Artsakh Goris)
66	DF	RUS	Maksim Zhestokov (to (Russia) Akron Tolyatti)
70	MF	UKR	Serhiy Shevchuk
77	FW	MKD	Denis Mahmudov (to (Belgium) Roeselare)
96	MF	NGA	Joseph Adah (to (Armenia) Gandzasar Kapan)

=== Shirak ===
In: Note: Flags indicate national team as defined under FIFA eligibility rules; some limited exceptions apply. Players may hold more than one non-FIFA nationality.

No.	Pos.	Nation	Player
3	DF	ARM	Hovhannes Nazaryan (from (Armenia) Noah)
6	MF	ARM	Erik Vardanyan (on loan from (Armenia) Urartu)
8	MF	ARM	Hrachya Geghamyan (on loan from (Armenia) Urartu)
11	MF	ARM	Martin Grigoryan
14	MF	ARM	Emil Yeghiazaryan (from (Armenia) Gandzasar Kapan)
22	DF	ARM	Arsen Sadoyan (on loan from (Armenia) Urartu)
23	MF	ARM	Petros Afajanyan (from (Armenia) Ararat Yerevan)
77	GK	ARM	Gevorg Kasparov (from (Armenia) Gandzasar Kapan)
88	FW	ARM	Vardan Bakalyan (from (Armenia) Van)

Out: Note: Flags indicate national team as defined under FIFA eligibility rules; some limited exceptions apply. Players may hold more than one non-FIFA nationality.

No.	Pos.	Nation	Player
2	DF	ARM	Vardan Shakhbazyan (to (Armenia) Noah)
3	DF	ARM	Artur Amiryan
6	DF	SRB	Marko Prljević (to (Armenia) Ararat Yerevan)
8	DF	ARM	Zhirayr Margaryan (to (Armenia) Ararat Yerevan)
10	MF	ARM	Edgar Malakyan (to (Armenia) Ararat Yerevan)
11	MF	NGA	Solomon Udo (to (Armenia) Ararat Yerevan)
19	MF	ARM	Karen Muradyan (to (Armenia) Ararat Yerevan)
22	DF	ARM	Hrayr Mkoyan (to (Armenia) Ararat Yerevan)
23	DF	SRB	Bogdan Miličić (to (Serbia) Zlatibor Čajetina)
43	MF	ARM	Artush Mirzakhanyan
45	GK	RUS	Vsevolod Yermakov (to (Armenia) Ararat Yerevan)
70	FW	SRB	Uroš Nenadović (to (Armenia) Ararat Yerevan)
77	MF	ARM	David Manoyan (to (Armenia) Ararat Yerevan)

=== Urartu ===
In: Note: Flags indicate national team as defined under FIFA eligibility rules; some limited exceptions apply. Players may hold more than one non-FIFA nationality.

No.	Pos.	Nation	Player
4	MF	UKR	Pavlo Stepanets (from (Armenia) Ararat Yerevan)
8	MF	RUS	Maksim Mashnev (from (Russia) Chayka Peschanokopskoye)
12	FW	HAI	Jonel Désiré (to (Armenia) Lori)
15	DF	RUS	Dmitry Guz (from Ararat-Armenia)
18	FW	RUS	Aleksandr Radchenko (from (Russia) Tekstilshchik Ivanovo)
25	MF	ARM	Edgar Grigoryan (loan return from (Armenia) Noah)
26	DF	GHA	Annan Mensah (from (Armenia) Lori)
30	MF	NGA	Uguchukwu Iwu (from (Armenia) Lori)
33	MF	BRA	Vitinho (from (Armenia) Ararat Yerevan)
88	DF	BRA	James (from (Armenia) Ararat Yerevan)
90	MF	RUS	Oleg Polyakov (from (Russia) Armavir)
—	MF	NGA	Juesukobiruo Okotie (from (Nigeria) Sporting Warri)

Out: Note: Flags indicate national team as defined under FIFA eligibility rules; some limited exceptions apply. Players may hold more than one non-FIFA nationality.

No.	Pos.	Nation	Player
6	DF	BRA	Ebert (to (Armenia) Van)
7	MF	ARM	Aram Bareghamyan (Retired)
8	MF	CRO	Jurica Grgec (to (Croatia) NK Varaždin)
11	FW	RUS	Igor Paderin (Retired)
17	MF	RUS	Taymuraz Toboyev
18	FW	VEN	Juan Carlos Azócar
25	DF	VEN	Rubén Ramírez
26	MF	ALG	Redа Belahcen (to (France) Haguenau)
30	DF	GHA	Edward Kpodo
33	DF	ARM	Arsen Sadoyan (on loan to (Armenia) Shirak)
88	DF	ARM	Vahagn Ayvazyan (to (Armenia) Van)
91	MF	CRO	Marco Brtan (to (Bosnia and Herzegovina) Borac Banja Luka)
93	FW	RUS	Semyon Sinyavsky (to (Russia) Kuban-Holding Pavlovskaya)
—	MF	ARM	Hrachya Geghamyan (on loan to (Armenia) Shirak)
—	MF	ARM	Erik Vardanyan (on loan to (Armenia) Shirak)
—	DF	ARM	Arsen Yeghiazaryan (to (Armenia) Lori)

=== Van ===
In: Note: Flags indicate national team as defined under FIFA eligibility rules; some limited exceptions apply. Players may hold more than one non-FIFA nationality.

No.	Pos.	Nation	Player
4	MF	CIV	Michael Gnolou
5	DF	RUS	Aleksandr Tenyayev (from (Russia) Mordovia Saransk)
7	DF	BRA	Ebert (from (Armenia) Urartu)
9	FW	ARM	Mihran Manasyan (from (Armenia) Lori)
11	FW	ARM	David Ghandilyan (from (Armenia) Lori)
12	GK	ARM	Henri Avagyan (from (Armenia) Alashkert)
14	MF	ARM	Arman Khachatryan (from Ararat-Armenia, previously on loan)
15	MF	ARM	Davit Nalbandyan (on loan from Ararat-Armenia)
18	DF	ARM	Vahagn Ayvazyan (from (Armenia) Urartu)
98	MF	ARM	Garegin Kirakosyan (from (Autonomous Republic of Crimea) FC Kyzyltash Bakhchisaray)

Out: Note: Flags indicate national team as defined under FIFA eligibility rules; some limited exceptions apply. Players may hold more than one non-FIFA nationality.

No.	Pos.	Nation	Player
4	MF	RUS	Aleksandr Ladik
5	DF	RUS	Arsen Kaytov (to (Armenia) Lernayin Artsakh Goris)
9	MF	ARM	Sos Tadevosyan
10	FW	ARM	Vardan Bakalyan (to (Armenia) Shirak)
15	DF	NGA	Deou Dosa (to (Armenia) Lori)
16	FW	ARM	Hovhannes Ilangyozyan
18	MF	ARM	Vigen Begoyan (to (Armenia) Noravank)
22	GK	ARM	Anushavan Tarverdyan (to (Armenia) Sevan)
23	DF	ARM	Artur Stepanyan (loan return to (Armenia) Noah)
28	MF	RUS	Batraz Tedeyev (to (Armenia) Lernayin Artsakh Goris)
98	FW	RUS	Evgeni Gavrilov
