= Manuel Vargas =

Manuel Vargas may refer to:

- Manuel Vargas Acuña (fl. 1910s), Chilean politician
- Manuel Vargas (boxer) (born 1981), Mexican professional boxer
- Manuel Vargas (footballer) (born 1991), Panamanian footballer
- Manuel Vargas (singer), lead member of the Mariachi Sangre Mexicana
- Manuel Francisco de Vargas (1849–1921), Portuguese engineer and politician
- Manuel Sarmanho Vargas (1917–1997), Brazilian politician
