= Djimy Alexis =

Haitian footballer (born 1997)

Personal information
- Full name: Djimy Bend Alexis
- Date of birth: 8 October 1997 (age 29)
- Place of birth: Cap-Haïtien, Haiti
- Position: Defender

Senior career*
Years	Team	Apps	(Gls)
2017–2019	Capoise		
2019–2021	Lori	35	(2)
2021–2022	Sektzia Ness Ziona	33	(1)
2022–2024	Hapoel Petah Tikva	28	(0)
2024–2025	Hapoel Rishon LeZion	14	(0)

International career^{‡}
2018–	Haiti	8	(1)
- * Club domestic league appearances and goals as of 1 June 2025 ‡ National team caps and goals as of 22:37, 2 December 2019 (UTC)

Djimy Bend Alexis (born 8 October 1997) is a Haitian professional footballer who plays as a defender for the Haiti national team.

== Career ==
=== Club ===
On 31 August 2019, Alexis signed for Armenia's Lori FC on a two-year contract.

On 25 June 2021, Alexis signed for Sektzia Ness Ziona in Israel.

On 4 September 2022, Alexis signed for Hapoel Petah Tikva.

=== International ===
Alexis made his first international appearance for Haiti against Saint Lucia during a CONCACAF Nations League qualifying match in October 2018. On 24 June 2019, Alexis conceded an own goal against Costa Rica in the final group stage match of the CONCACAF Gold Cup. Later in the match, Alexis scored his first international goal, securing a top place finish for Haiti in Group B.

== Career statistics ==
=== Club ===
As of match played 1 June 2022

Club	Season	League			National Cup		Continental		Other		Total	
Club	Season	Division	Apps	Goals	Apps	Goals	Apps	Goals	Apps	Goals	Apps	Goals
Lori	2019–20	Armenian Premier League	22	0	1	0	-		-		23	0
Lori	2020–21	Armenian Premier League	13	2	2	0	-		-		15	2
Lori	Total		35	2	3	0	-	-	-	-	38	2
Sektzia Ness Ziona	2021–22	Liga Leumit	33	1	1	0	-		4	0	38	1
Sektzia Ness Ziona	Total		33	1	1	0	-	-	4	0	38	1
Hapoel Petah Tikva	2022–23	Liga Leumit	0	0	0	0	-		0	0	0	0
Hapoel Petah Tikva	Total		0	0	0	0	-	-	0	0	0	0
Career total			68	3	4	0	-	-	4	0	76	3

=== International ===
Haiti national team
Year	Apps	Goals
2018	1	0
2019	5	1
Total	6	1

Statistics accurate as of match played 15 October 2019

=== International goals ===
Scores and results list Haiti's goal tally first.

No.	Date	Venue	Opponent	Score	Result	Competition
1.	24 June 2019	Red Bull Arena, Harrison, United States	Costa Rica	2–1	2–1	2019 CONCACAF Gold Cup
