= Skoblikov =

Skoblikov (masculine, Russian: Скобликов) or Skoblikova (feminine, Russian: Скобликова) is a Russian surname. Notable people with the surname include:

- Lidiya Skoblikova (born 1939), Russian speed skater and coach
- Yevgeni Skoblikov (born 1990), Russian football player
