= Anicet Oura =

Ivorian footballer (born 1999)

Personal information
- Full name: Alain Anicet Oura
- Date of birth: 7 December 1999 (age 26)
- Place of birth: Ivory Coast
- Height: 1.85 m (6 ft 1 in)
- Position: Forward

Team information
- Current team: Simba

Senior career*
Years	Team	Apps	(Gls)
2017–2019	Africa Sports d'Abidjan		
2019–2021	Lori	12	(0)
2020	→ Masis (loan)	3	(4)
2021–2023	ASEC Mimosas		
2023–2025	Stellenbosch	26	(4)
2024–2025	→ Muaither (loan)	11	(3)
2025	Gnistan	5	(0)
2026–	Simba		

International career
2022–2023	Ivory Coast	2	(0)
- * Club domestic league appearances and goals as of 19 November 2025

Alain Anicet Oura (born 7 December 1999) is an Ivorian professional footballer who plays as a forward for Tanzanian Premier League club Simba.

== Club career ==
On 1 August 2025, Oura signed with Finnish Veikkausliiga club IF Gnistan.

== International career ==
Oura made his debut for the Ivory Coast national football team on 27 August 2022 against Burkina Faso. He was also named to the Ivory Coast squad for the 2022 African Nations Championship.

== Career statistics ==
=== Club ===
As of 6 August 2025

Appearances and goals by club, season and competition
Club	Season	League			National cup (Note: Includes Armenian Cup, Nedbank Cup and Emir of Qatar Cup)		League cup (Note: Includes MTN 8)		Continental		Other		Total	
Club	Season	Division	Apps	Goals	Apps	Goals	Apps	Goals	Apps	Goals	Apps	Goals	Apps	Goals
Africa Sports d'Abidjan	2017–18	Ivorian Ligue 1					–		2 (Note: Appearances in CAF Confederation Cup)	0	–		2	0
Lori	2019–20	Armenian Premier League	9	0	1	0	–		–		–		10	0
Lori	2020–21	Armenian Premier League	3	0	1	0	–		–		–		4	0
Lori	Total		12	0	2	0	0	0	0	0	0	0	14	0
Masis (loan)	2019–20	Armenian First League	3	4	–		–		–		–		3	4
ASEC Mimosas	2021–22	Ivorian Ligue 1					–		11 (Note: Appearances in CAF Champions League and CAF Confederations Cup)	0	–		11	0
ASEC Mimosas	2022–23	Ivorian Ligue 1					–		10	2	–		10	2
ASEC Mimosas	Total		0	0	0	0	0	0	21	2	0	0	21	2
Stellenbosch	2023–24	South African Premiership	26	4	4	3	3	0	–		2 (Note: Appearances in Carling Knockout Cup)	1	35	8
Stellenbosch	2024–25	South African Premiership	0	0	0	0	1	0	1	0	0	0	2	0
Stellenbosch	Total		26	4	4	3	4	0	1	0	2	1	37	8
Muaither (loan)	2024–25	Qatari Second Division	11	3	1	0	–		–		–		12	3
Gnistan	2025	Veikkausliiga	5	0	0	0	0	0	–		–		5	0
Simba	2025–26	Tanzanian Premier League	0	0	0	0	–		3 (Note: Appearances in CAF Champions League)	2	–		3	2
Career total			57	11	7	3	4	0	27	4	2	1	97	18

=== International ===
As of match played 18 January 2023

Appearances and goals by national team and year
National team	Year	Apps	Goals
Ivory Coast	2022	1	0
Ivory Coast	2023	1	0
Total		2	0

== Honours ==
ASEC Mimosas

- Ivorian Ligue 1: 2020–21, 2021–22, 2022–23

Stellenbosch

- Carling Knockout Cup: 2023
- MTN 8 runner-up: 2024
