= Albert Solomonov =

Russian-Israeli footballer and coach

Albert Solomonov אלברט סולומונוב
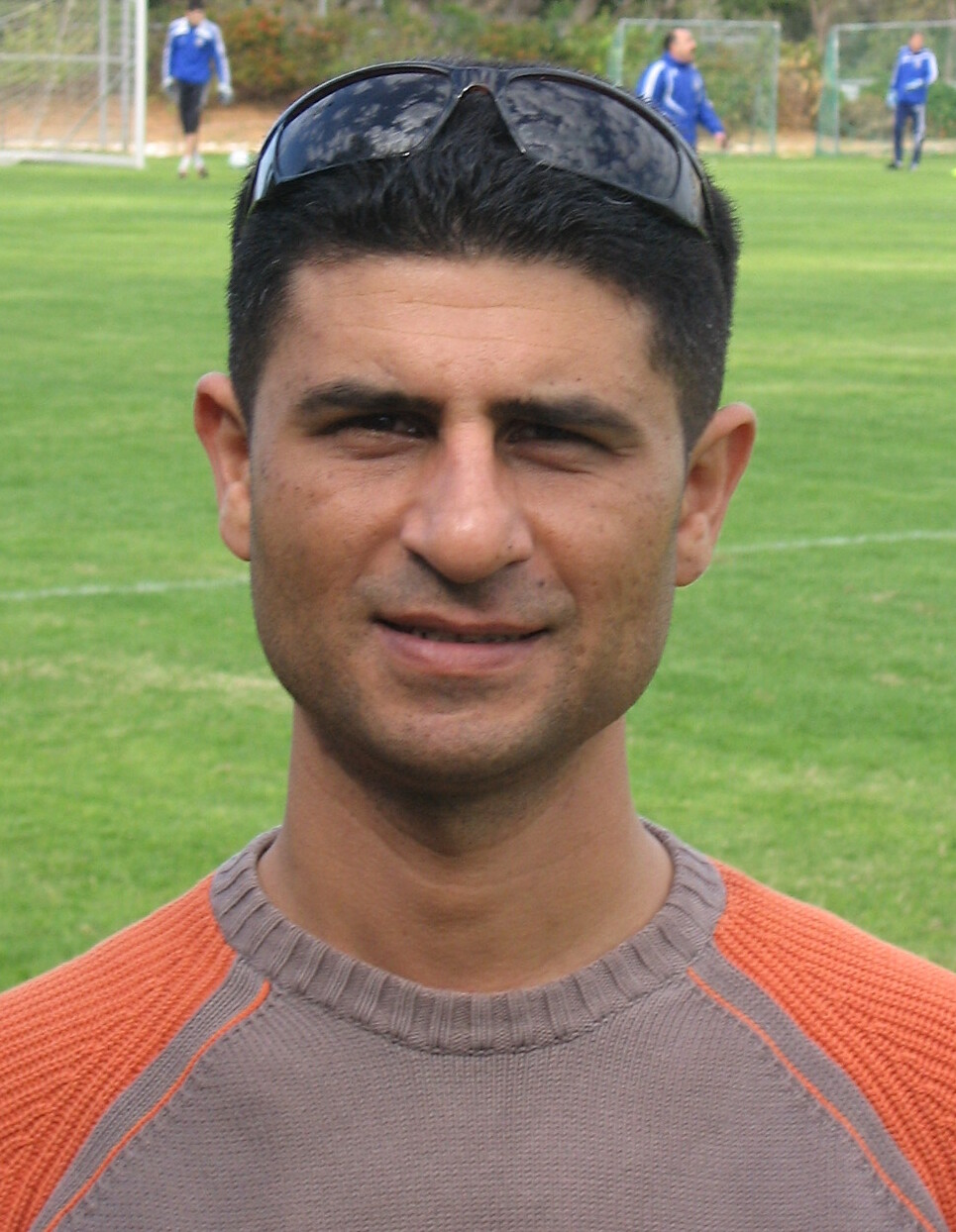
- Solomonov in 2010

Personal information
- Full name: Albert Solomonov
- Date of birth: 25 September 1973 (age 53)
- Place of birth: Derbent, Dagestan ASSR, Russian SFSR, Soviet Union

Team information
- Current team: Lori (manager)

Youth career
- 1981–1989: Derbent Youth Sports School

Senior career*
Years	Team	Apps	(Gls)
1989–199?	Vanguard Derbent		

International career
199?	Soviet Union U17		

Managerial career
- 1997–2002: Maccabi Hadera (youth)
- 2003–2004: Maccabi Tel Aviv (youth)
- 2004–2006: Maccabi Petah Tikva (youth)
- 2006–2007: Maccabi Tel Aviv (youth)
- 2007–2008: Hapoel Acre
- 2008–2010: Beitar Nes Tubruk (youth)
- 2010–2011: Ahva Arraba
- 2011–2012: Israel U15
- 2012: Olimpia Bălţi
- 2014: Hapoel Hadera (youth)
- 2015: Hapoel Ironi Baqa al-Gharbiyye
- 2020–2021: Lori
- 2025: FC Dinamo Samarqand
- * Club domestic league appearances and goals

Albert Solomonov (Hebrew: אלברט סולומונוב; born 25 September 1973) is a Russian-Israeli football coach and former player who is the current manager of the Lori.

== Career ==
=== Managerial ===
On 5 August 2020, Armenian Premier League club Lori FC announced Solomonov as their new head coach on a one-year contract with the option of a second.
