= Aleksandr Stepanov (footballer, born 1996) =

Russian footballer

Personal information
- Full name: Aleksandr Vyacheslavovich Stepanov
- Date of birth: 5 June 1996 (age 30)
- Place of birth: Novo-Kulikovo, Moscow Oblast, Russia
- Height: 1.87 m (6 ft 2 in)
- Position: Defender

Team information
- Current team: Dynamo Kirov
- Number: 19

Youth career
- –2016: Dynamo Moscow

Senior career*
| Years | Team | Apps | (Gls) |
| 2016 | Dynamo Moscow | 0 | (0) |
| 2016–2017 | Dynamo-2 Moscow | 22 | (2) |
| 2017–2020 | Volgar Astrakhan | 46 | (1) |
| 2020–2021 | Lori | 15 | (0) |
| 2021–2022 | Van | 32 | (0) |
| 2022–2025 | Amkar Perm | 51 | (2) |
| 2025–2026 | Sibir Novosibirsk | 16 | (2) |
| 2026– | Dynamo Kirov | 27 | (3) |
- * Club domestic league appearances and goals as of 15 November 2026

Aleksandr Vyacheslavovich Stepanov (Russian: Александр Вячеславович Степанов; born 5 June 1996) is a Russian football player who plays for Dynamo Kirov.

== Club career ==
Stepanov made his debut in the Russian Professional Football League for FC Dynamo-2 Moscow on 20 July 2016 in a game against FC Tekstilshchik Ivanovo.

Stepanov made his Russian Football National League debut for FC Volgar Astrakhan on 15 July 2017 in a game against FC Rotor Volgograd.

On 30 August 2020, Lori FC announced the signing of Stepanov to a one-year contract with the option of another.
