= Armen Sanamyan =

Armenian footballer and coach (born 1966)

Personal information
- Full name: Armen Sanamyan
- Date of birth: 1 February 1966 (age 60)
- Height: 1.72 m (5 ft 8 in)
- Position: Midfielder

Senior career*
Years	Team	Apps	(Gls)
1983	Ararat Yerevan	0	(0)
1984	Shirak Leninakan	1	(0)
1985–1986	Ararat Yerevan	0	(0)
1987–1989	Kotayk Abovyan	66	(13)
1989–1990	Spitak	56	(32)
1991	Ararat Yerevan-2	28	(10)
1993–1997	Pyunik	75	(28)
1997–1999	Nejmeh		(6)
1999–2001	Racing Beirut		(3+)
2001	Pyunik	7	(0)
2002	Zvartnots-AAL	7	(3)
Total		240+	(95+)

International career
1997	Armenia	2	(0)

Managerial career
- 2012: King Delux
- 2013: Alashkert
- 2017: Nejmeh
- 2018: Artsakh
- 2019–2020: Sevan
- 2020: Lori (caretaker)
- * Club domestic league appearances and goals

Armen Sanamyan (Armenian: Արմեն Սանամյան; born 1 February 1966) is an Armenian professional football coach and former player.

== Managerial career ==
On 2 June 2020, Sanamyan was announced as caretaker manager of Armenian club Lori.

== Career statistics ==
=== International ===
National team	Year	Apps	Goals
Armenia	1997	2	0
Total		2	0
