= Ivan Božović =

Serbian footballer

Personal information
- Date of birth: 25 May 1990 (age 36)
- Place of birth: Kragujevac, SFR Yugoslavia
- Height: 1.85 m (6 ft 1 in)
- Position: Right-back

Team information
- Current team: Balzan
- Number: 2

Youth career
- 1999–2008: Radnički Kragujevac

Senior career*
Years	Team	Apps	(Gls)
2008–2012	Radnički Kragujevac	77	(0)
2012	OFK Beograd	1	(0)
2013	Smederevo	14	(0)
2013–2014	Donji Srem	10	(0)
2014–2015	Jedinstvo Putevi	24	(0)
2015–2018	Zemun	35	(1)
2018	→ Balzan (loan)	10	(0)
2018–2020	Balzan	35	(2)
2020–2021	Lori	12	(0)
2021–2022	Timok	24	(2)
2022-	Balzan	43	(0)
- * Club domestic league appearances and goals as of 13 May 2024

Ivan Božović (Serbian Cyrillic: Иван Божовић; born 25 May 1990) is a Serbian footballer who plays for Balzan.
