= Diogo Coelho (footballer, born 1992) =

Portuguese footballer

Personal information
- Full name: Diogo Manuel Gonçalves Coelho
- Date of birth: 8 July 1992 (age 34)
- Place of birth: Oeiras, Portugal
- Height: 1.68 m (5 ft 6 in)
- Position: Left-back

Team information
- Current team: Machico
- Number: 55

Youth career
- 1999–2008: Benfica
- 2008–2010: Estrela Amadora
- 2009: → Benfica (loan)
- 2010–2011: Real Massamá

Senior career*
Years	Team	Apps	(Gls)
2011–2012	Ribeirão	28	(0)
2012	Real Massamá	0	(0)
2012–2013	Trofense	26	(0)
2013–2014	Braga B	22	(0)
2014–2016	União Madeira	11	(0)
2015–2016	→ Farense (loan)	33	(0)
2016–2017	Santa Clara	11	(0)
2017–2018	Real Massamá	26	(0)
2018–2019	ÍBV	25	(0)
2020	Lori	10	(1)
2020	Gandzasar	4	(0)
2021–2022	Vestri	25	(0)
2022–2023	Sūduva	32	(0)
2023–2024	1º Dezembro	25	(0)
2024–	Machico	15	(0)

International career
2010	Portugal U18	3	(0)
- * Club domestic league appearances and goals as of 5 February 2025

Diogo Manuel Gonçalves Coelho (born 8 July 1992) is a Portuguese footballer who plays as a left-back for Machico.

== Club career ==
Born in Oeiras, Lisbon metropolitan area, Coelho spent nine of his formative years with S.L. Benfica. He made his debut as a senior with G.D. Ribeirão in the 2011–12 season, in the third division.

From 2012 to 2018, Coelho played in the LigaPro, representing in quick succession C.D. Trofense, S.C. Braga B, C.F. União, S.C. Farense, C.D. Santa Clara and Real SC. He played his first match as a professional on 30 September 2012 while at the service of the first of those teams, featuring the full 90 minutes in a 1–1 home draw against S.C. Covilhã.

Coelho spent the 2018 and 2019 campaigns in the Icelandic Úrvalsdeild karla, with ÍBV. On 21 July 2020, FC Gandzasar Kapan announced his signing from Lori FC also of the Armenian Premier League.

On 24 January 2021, Coelho joined Icelandic club Vestri. In June 2022, he moved to the Lithuanian A Lyga with FK Sūduva.
