= Manuel Francisco de Vargas =

Portuguese engineer and politician (1849 -1921)

- Born: 23 November 1849; Mértola, Portugal
- Died: 9 December 1921 (aged 72)
- Other name: Manuel Francisco Vargas
- Occupations: Engineer, businessman, numismatist, railroad worker and politician
- Known for: Having planned the construction of the Douro line, and drawn up the Plan for the Network South of the Tagus River

Manuel Francisco de Vargas (23 November 1849 – 9 December 1921), also known as Adviser Vargas (Conselheiro Vargas), was an engineer, businessman and politician from Portugal. He was a prominent numismatist, specializing in Hispano-Arab coins.

== Biography ==
Born in Mértola in the region of Alentejo, he was one of the engineers of the Douro line, having been appointed, on 4 February 1888, as one of the members of a commission to organize the expropriations necessary for the construction of the section between the stations of Porto-São Bento and Porto-Campanhã. He was deputy director and administrator of the Caminhos de Ferro Portugueses company. He also held the position of Ministry of Public Works, Trade and Industry between 1900 and 1903, distinguishing himself by reforming the rail transport tariff systems and by drawing up and publishing the Rede ao Sul do Tejo Plan, an official document that outlined all the railway projects of that time in the south of Portugal.

He was Minister of Public Works from 1900 to 1903.

As a specialist in Arabic numismatics, he was the author of several works published in O Arqueólogo Português. He is also the author of the "Catálogo das Moedas Árabes", published in volume XI of the "Boletim da Associação dos Arqueólogos".

He died on 9 December 1921 at age 72.
