= Artem Gomelko =

Belarusian footballer (born 1989)

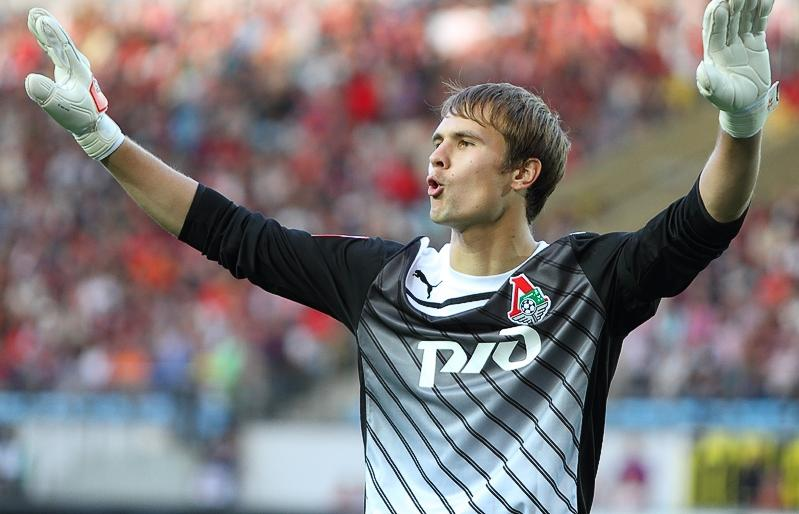
- Gomelko with Lokomotiv Moscow in 2011

Personal information
- Full name: Artem Viktorovich Gomelko
- Date of birth: 8 December 1989 (age 36)
- Place of birth: Zhodino, Belarusian SSR, Soviet Union
- Height: 1.92 m (6 ft 3 1/2 in)
- Position: Goalkeeper

Team information
- Current team: Sparta Kazimierza Wielka
- Number: 1

Youth career
- 2004–2007: Torpedo Zhodino

Senior career*
Years	Team	Apps	(Gls)
2006–2007	Torpedo Zhodino	2	(0)
2008–2012	Lokomotiv Moscow	1	(0)
2010	→ Naftan Novopolotsk (loan)	22	(0)
2011	→ Torpedo-BelAZ Zhodino (loan)	12	(0)
2013–2014	Granit Mikashevichi	42	(0)
2015–2016	Slonim	44	(0)
2017–2020	Smolevichi	25	(0)
2020–2021	Lori	13	(0)
2021	Slutsk	11	(0)
2022	Sparta Kazimierza Wielka	16	(0)
2022–2024	LKS Jawiszowice	68	(0)
2024–	Sparta Kazimierza Wielka	45	(0)
2026	→ Kmita Zabierzów (loan)	13	(0)

International career
2007–2011	Belarus U21	11	(0)
2011	Belarus Olympic	4	(0)
- * Club domestic league appearances and goals as of 16:10, 2 October 2026 (UTC)

Artem Viktaravich Gomelko (Belarusian: Арцём Віктаравіч Гамелько, Russian: Артём Викторович Гомелько; 8 December 1989) is a Belarusian professional footballer who plays as an goalkeeper for IV liga Lesser Poland club Sparta Kazimierza Wielka, where he also serves as a goalkeeping coach.

== Club career ==
He made his Russian Premier League debut for Lokomotiv Moscow on 22 June 2011 in a game against CSKA Moscow.

== International career ==
Gomelko was part of the Belarus U21 team that participated in the UEFA U-21 Championship 2009 and UEFA U-21 Championship 2011, but did not play in any matches, as Pavel Chasnowski and Alyaksandr Hutar respectively were selected as the starting goalkeepers. Gomelko received his first call-up to the senior team of his country in March 2011 for a Euro 2012 qualifier against Albania and a friendly match versus Canada, but did not make an appearance in these games.

== Honours ==
Sparta Kazimierza Wielka

- IV liga Świętokrzyskie: 2024–25
