= Pavel Kudryashov =

Russian footballer

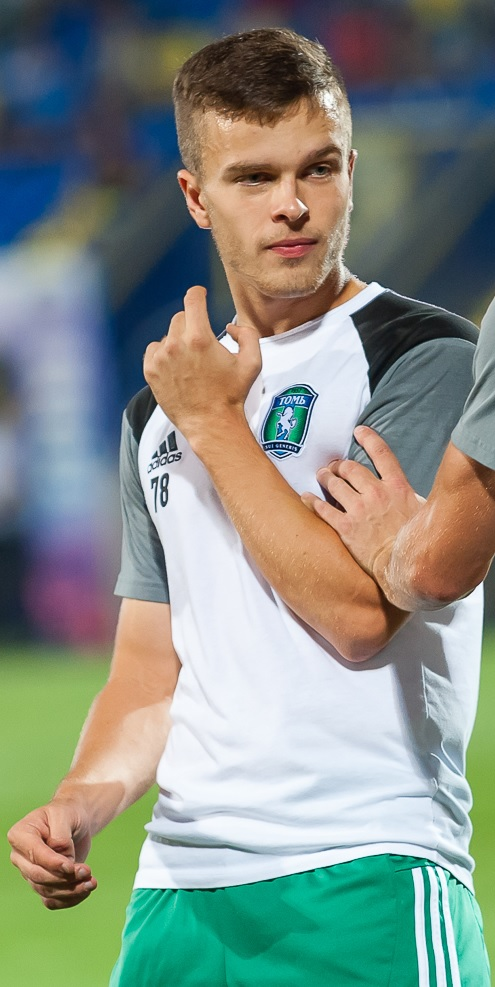
- Kudryashov with Tom Tomsk in 2016

Personal information
- Full name: Pavel Igorevich Kudryashov
- Date of birth: 27 November 1996 (age 29)
- Place of birth: Tomsk, Russia
- Height: 1.74 m (5 ft 9 in)
- Position: Forward

Youth career
- 2003–2011: Tom Tomsk
- 2011–2012: Dynamo Moscow
- 2012–2013: Tom Tomsk

Senior career*
Years	Team	Apps	(Gls)
2013–2016	Tom Tomsk	8	(0)
2014–2016	→ Tom-2 Tomsk	41	(9)
2017–2018	Krylia Sovetov Samara	1	(0)
2017–2018	→ Tom Tomsk (loan)	17	(0)
2018–2020	Tom Tomsk	9	(1)
2019–2020	→ Novosibirsk (loan)	10	(0)
2020	Belshina Bobruisk	2	(0)
2020–2021	Lori	3	(0)
2021	Krymteplytsia Molodizhne	10	(1)
2021–2022	Tom Tomsk	25	(5)
2022–2023	Zvezda St. Petersburg	18	(1)
2023	Irtysh Omsk	6	(1)
2023–2024	Dynamo Bryansk	16	(1)
- * Club domestic league appearances and goals as of 8 June 2024

Pavel Igorevich Kudryashov (Russian: Павел Игоревич Кудряшов; born 27 November 1996) is a Russian football player who plays as a right winger.

== Club career ==
Kudryashov made his professional debut in the Russian Professional Football League for FC Tom-2 Tomsk on 19 July 2014 in a game against FC Yakutiya Yakutsk.

Kudryashov made his Russian Premier League debut for FC Tom Tomsk on 7 August 2016 in a game against FC Lokomotiv Moscow.

On 18 October 2020, Kudryashov signed for Lori FC, leaving the club on 13 January 2021 after making 3 appearances for the club.
