= Gor Manukyan =

Armenian footballer

Personal information
- Date of birth: 27 September 1993 (age 33)
- Place of birth: Yerevan, Armenia
- Height: 1.92 m (6 ft 4 in)
- Position: Goalkeeper

Team information
- Current team: Van
- Number: 1

Senior career*
Years	Team	Apps	(Gls)
2011	Pyunik II		
2012–2019	Pyunik	82	(0)
2019–2021	Alashkert	2	(0)
2021	Lori	0	(0)
2021–2022	Lernayin Artsakh	19	(0)
2022–2023	Ararat Yerevan	6	(0)
2023–2024	West Armenia	10	(0)
2024–2025	Alashkert	10	(0)
2025–	Van	8	(0)

International career^{‡}
2018–	Armenia	1	(0)
- * Club domestic league appearances and goals as of 11 December 2025 ‡ National team caps and goals as of 00:07, 11 October 2019 (UTC)

Gor Manukyan (born 27 September 1993) is an Armenian professional footballer who plays as a goalkeeper for Van.

== Early life ==
Manukyan was born in Yerevan, Armenia on 27 September 1993.

== Career ==
=== Club ===
On 19 August 2019, Manukyan was released by FC Pyunik, signing for FC Alashkert on 26 August 2019.

=== National team ===
Manukyan played one international friendly match for the Armenian national football team on the 27th of March, 2018 at the Hanrapetakan Stadium in Armenia.

== Career statistics ==
=== Club ===
As of match played 17 March 2018

Appearances and goals by club, season and competition
Club	Season	League			National Cup		Continental		Other		Total	
Club	Season	Division	Apps	Goals	Apps	Goals	Apps	Goals	Apps	Goals	Apps	Goals
Pyunik	2012–13	Armenian Premier League	16	0	5	0	0	0	-		21	0
Pyunik	2013–14	Armenian Premier League	20	0	4	0	4	0	1	0	29	0
Pyunik	2014–15	Armenian Premier League	0	0	0	0	-		-		0	0
Pyunik	2015–16	Armenian Premier League	14	0	2	0	0	0	1	0	17	0
Pyunik	2016–17	Armenian Premier League	13	0	2	0	2	0	-		17	0
Pyunik	2017–18	Armenian Premier League	19	0	2	0	1	0	-		22	0
Pyunik	2018–19	Armenian Premier League	0	0	0	0	0	0	-		0	0
Pyunik	2019–20	Armenian Premier League	0	0	0	0	0	0	-		0	0
Pyunik	Total		82	0	15	0	7	0	2	0	106	0
Alashkert	2019–20	Armenian Premier League	0	0	0	0	0	0	0	0	0	0
Alashkert	2020–21	Armenian Premier League	0	0	0	0	0	0	-		0	0
Alashkert	Total		0	0	0	0	0	0	0	0	0	0
Career total			82	0	15	0	7	0	2	0	106	0

=== International ===
Armenia national team
Year	Apps	Goals
2018	1	0
Total	1	0

Statistics accurate as of match played 27 March 2018
