= Almog Ohayon =

Israeli footballer

Personal information
- Full name: Almog Ohayon
- Date of birth: 5 August 1994 (age 32)
- Place of birth: Kiryat Ata, Israel
- Position: Defensive midfielder

Team information
- Current team: Hapoel Lod

Youth career
- 2007–2012: Maccabi Ironi Kiryat Ata
- 2012–2013: Maccabi Tel Aviv

Senior career*
Years	Team	Apps	(Gls)
2013–2014	Maccabi Ironi Kiryat Ata	29	(7)
2014	Hapoel Haifa	1	(0)
2015	Maccabi Petah Tikva	1	(0)
2015–2016	Ironi Tiberias	26	(1)
2016	Hapoel Beit She'an	14	(1)
2017	Hapoel Baqa al-Gharbiyye	26	(4)
2018–2019	Hapoel Kfar Saba	30	(0)
2019–2020	Hapoel Kfar Shalem	15	(2)
2020	Hapoel Petah Tikva	6	(1)
2020–2021	Lori FC	8	(2)
2021	Shimshon Kafr Qasem	0	(0)
2021–2022	Ironi Nesher	22	(3)
2023	Hapoel Kfar Saba	2	(0)
2024–2025	Hapoel Lod	0	(0)
2025–	Gissin 1912 Petah Tilva	10	(2)
- * Club domestic league appearances and goals as of 15 June 2023 (UTC)

Almog Ohayon (Hebrew: אלמוג אוחיון; born 5 August 1994) is an Israeli professional footballer who plays as a defensive midfielder for Israeli Liga Gimel club FC Gissin 1912 Petah Tikva.

== Career statistics ==
=== Club ===
As of 13 August 2020.

Club	Season	League			National Cup		League Cup		Continental		Other		Total	
Club	Season	Division	Apps	Goals	Apps	Goals	Apps	Goals	Apps	Goals	Apps	Goals	Apps	Goals
Maccabi Ironi Kiryat Ata	2013–14	Liga Alef	27	7	3	2	0	0	0	0	0	0	30	9
Hapoel Haifa	2014–15	Israeli Premier League	1	0	0	0	1	0	0	0	0	0	2	0
Maccabi Petah Tikva	2014–15	Israeli Premier League	1	0	0	0	0	0	0	0	0	0	1	0
Ironi Tiberias	2015–16	Liga Alef	26	1	3	0	0	0	0	0	0	0	29	1
Hapoel Beit She'an	2016–17	Liga Alef	14	1	1	0	0	0	0	0	0	0	15	1
Hapoel Baqa al-Gharbiyye	2016–17	Liga Alef	12	1	0	0	0	0	0	0	0	0	12	1
Hapoel Baqa al-Gharbiyye	2017–18	Liga Alef	14	3	1	0	0	0	0	0	0	0	15	3
Hapoel Kfar Saba	2017–18	Liga Leumit	12	0	1	0	0	0	0	0	0	0	13	0
Hapoel Kfar Saba	2018–19	Liga Leumit	17	0	2	1	2	0	0	0	0	0	21	1
Hapoel Kfar Shalem	2019–20	Liga Alef	14	3	1	0	0	0	0	0	0	0	15	3
Hapoel Haifa	2019–20	Liga Leumit	6	1	0	0	0	0	0	0	0	0	6	1
Lori	2020–21	Armenian Premier League	1	0	1	0	0	0	0	0	0	0	2	0
Career total			145	7	13	3	3	0	0	0	0	0	161	20

== Personal life ==
In 2026, Ohayon competed with his friend Tom Shelach on the tenth season of the Israeli reality competition show HaMerotz LaMillion and finished first winning the season.
