= Manuel Vargas (footballer) =

Panamanian footballer (born 1991)

Personal information
- Full name: Manuel Alexander Vargas Moreno
- Date of birth: 19 January 1991 (age 35)
- Place of birth: Panama City, Panama
- Height: 1.79 m (5 ft 10 in)
- Position: Midfielder

Team information
- Current team: Potros del Este

Senior career*
Years	Team	Apps	(Gls)
2010–2017	Tauro		
2014	→ Alpha United (loan)		
2017	Chorrillo	11	(0)
2018	San Francisco	30	(1)
2019	Costa del Este	25	(0)
2020	Santos de Nasca		
2020	Lori	1	(0)
2020	San Francisco	12	(0)
2021	Tauro	11	(0)
2021	Costa del Este	10	(0)
2022–	Potros del Este	36	(2)

International career^{‡}
2016–2017	Panama	9	(0)
- * Club domestic league appearances and goals as of 1 January 2024 ‡ National team caps and goals as of 5 December 2024

Manuel Alexander Vargas Moreno (born 19 January 1991) is a Panamanian footballer who plays as a midfielder for Potros del Este and the Panama national football team.

== Career ==
On 20 August 2020, Armenian Premier League club Lori FC announced the signing of Vargas from Santos de Nasca. On 15 October 2020, Vargas left Lori to return to Panama and sign with San Francisco.

== Career statistics ==
Panama national team
Year	Apps	Goals
2016	6	0
2017	3	0
Total	9	0

Statistics accurate as of match played 14 November 2017
