= Nemanja Šćekić =

Montenegrin footballer

Personal information
- Date of birth: 17 December 1991 (age 34)
- Place of birth: Berane, SFR Yugoslavia
- Height: 1.93 m (6 ft 4 in)
- Position: Goalkeeper

Youth career
- Partizan

Senior career*
Years	Team	Apps	(Gls)
2009–2011	Čukarički	17	(0)
2011–2012	Mogren	18	(0)
2012–2014	Békéscsaba	24	(0)
2015–2016	Sinđelić Beograd	65	(0)
2017	Montana	9	(0)
2018	Javor Ivanjica	0	(0)
2018–2019	Zemun	0	(0)
2019	Žarkovo	10	(0)
2019–2020	Metalac GM	16	(0)
2020	Žarkovo	17	(0)
2021	Lori	3	(0)
2021–2022	Rudar Prijedor	28	(0)
2022–2023	Bregalnica Štip	28	(0)
2023–2024	Sloga Meridian	19	(0)
2024	Petrovac	1	(0)
Total		255	(0)

International career
2010–2011	Montenegro U21	7	(0)
- * Club domestic league appearances and goals as of 1 June 2025

Nemanja Šćekić (Cyrillic: Немања Шћекић; born 17 December 1991) is a Montenegrin retired footballer who played as a goalkeeper.

== Club career ==
Born in Berane, he played with FK Čukarički in the 2010–11 Serbian SuperLiga. As Čukarički got relegated at the end of the season, Ščekić returned to Montenegro and joined First League side FK Mogren. On 10 February 2017, he signed for 1 1/2 years with Bulgarian club Montana. On 7 September 2017, his contract was terminated by mutual consent.

== International career ==
He was part of the Montenegro national under-21 football team in 2010 and 2011.
