= Yevgeni Kirisov =

Russian footballer

Evgeni Kirisov
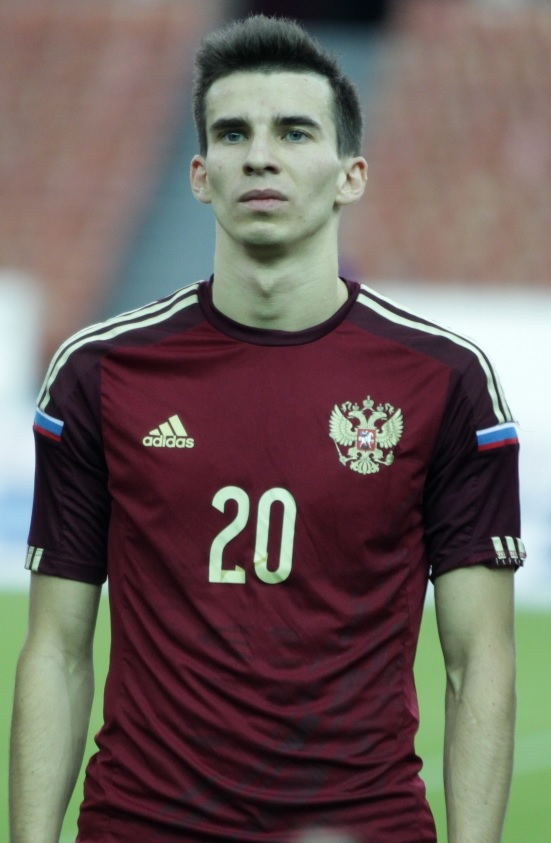
- Kirisov with Russia U21 in 2016

Personal information
- Full name: Eevgeni Vladimirovich Kirisov
- Date of birth: 14 February 1994 (age 32)
- Place of birth: Moscow, Russia
- Height: 1.76 m (5 ft 9 in)
- Position: Defender

Youth career
- 2000–2011: Lokomotiv Moscow

Senior career*
Years	Team	Apps	(Gls)
2011–2013	Lokomotiv Moscow	0	(0)
2014–2016	Domodedovo Moscow	25	(1)
2015	→ Stabæk (loan)	0	(0)
2016	→ Luch-Energiya Vladivostok (loan)	9	(0)
2016–2019	Volgar Astrakhan	24	(0)
2019–2020	Belshina Bobruisk	22	(0)
2021	Lori	2	(0)
2021–2022	Novosibirsk	5	(0)

International career
2009–2010	Russia U-16	8	(0)
2010–2011	Russia U-17	5	(2)
2012	Russia U-18	3	(0)
2012	Russia U-19	1	(0)
2014–2016	Russia U-21	16	(1)
- * Club domestic league appearances and goals

Yevgeni Vladimirovich Kirisov (Russian: Евгений Владимирович Кирисов; born 14 February 1994) is a Russian former footballer.

== Career ==
He made his professional debut in the Russian Professional Football League for FC Domodedovo Moscow on 12 July 2014 in a game against FC Spartak-2 Moscow.

In March 2015, Kirisov signed a short-term contract with Tippeligaen side Stabæk. Apart from a minor outing in the 2015 Norwegian Football Cup, he did not play any first-team games and was released in the summer.

He made his Russian Football National League debut for FC Luch-Energiya Vladivostok on 11 March 2016 in a game against FC Spartak-2 Moscow.

On 19 February 2021, Lori FC announced the signing of Kirisov.

== Career statistics ==
As of 3 June 2015

Season	Club	Division	League		Cup		Total	
Season	Club	Division	Apps	Goals	Apps	Goals	Apps	Goals
2014–15	Domodedovo Moscow	Russian Professional Football League	14	0	1	0	15	0
2015	Stabæk	Tippeligaen	0	0	1	0	1	0
2015–16	Domodedovo Moscow	Russian Professional Football League	6	1	0	0	6	1
Career Total			20	1	2	0	22	1
