= Nikola Popović (footballer) =

Serbian footballer (born 1994)

Personal information
- Date of birth: 31 May 1994 (age 32)
- Place of birth: Bor, FR Yugoslavia
- Height: 1.87 m (6 ft 2 in)
- Position: Second striker

Team information
- Current team: Kowloon City
- Number: 9

Youth career
- Timok

Senior career*
| Years | Team | Apps | (Gls) |
| 2012–2015 | Napredak Kruševac | 8 | (0) |
| 2013–2014 | → Kolubara (loan) | 23 | (5) |
| 2015 | → Kolubara (loan) | 14 | (1) |
| 2015–2017 | Dinamo Vranje | 41 | (1) |
| 2017 | BSK Borča | 15 | (1) |
| 2017–2018 | ČSK Čelarevo | 14 | (7) |
| 2018 | Grbalj | 25 | (4) |
| 2019–2020 | Dinamo Vranje | 32 | (4) |
| 2020 | Metalac GM | 19 | (1) |
| 2021 | Lori | 1 | (0) |
| 2021–2023 | Mladost Novi Sad | 53 | (7) |
| 2023 | Riteriai | 29 | (4) |
| 2023 | Riteriai B | 5 | (0) |
| 2024 | Inđija | 16 | (2) |
| 2024 | Zemun | 12 | (2) |
| 2025 | Lokomotiv Tashkent | 20 | (4) |
| 2026– | Kowloon City | 6 | (2) |
- * Club domestic league appearances and goals as of 8 November 2026

Nikola Popović (Serbian Cyrillic: Никола Поповић; born 31 May 1994) is a Serbian professional footballer who currently plays as a forward for Hong Kong Premier League club Kowloon City.

== Club career ==
On 23 February 2023, Popović signed with Lithuanian club Riteriai.

On 16 November 2023, it was announced that Popović had left Riteriai.

On 14 August 2026, Popović joined Hong Kong Premier League club Kowloon City.
