= Fernandinho (footballer, born February 1997) =

Portuguese footballer

Personal information
- Full name: Fernando Camões de Araújo
- Date of birth: 21 February 1997 (age 29)
- Place of birth: Lisbon, Portugal
- Height: 1.75 m (5 ft 9 in)
- Position: Midfielder

Team information
- Current team: Juventude Évora
- Number: 20

Youth career
- –2013: Benfica
- 2014–2017: Vitória de Guimarães
- 2018–2019: Estoril
- 2019–2020: Cova da Piedade

Senior career*
Years	Team	Apps	(Gls)
2017–2018	Famalicão	4	(0)
2020–2021	Lori	11	(0)
2021–2022	Barreirense	19	(0)
2022–2023	União de Santarém	8	(0)
2023–	Juventude Évora	6	(0)
- * Club domestic league appearances and goals as of 16:11, 28 December 2023 (UTC)

Fernando Camões de Araújo (born 21 February 1997), known as Fernandinho, is a Portuguese professional footballer who plays for Juventude Évora, as a midfielder.

== Football career ==
On 23 July 2017, Fernandinho made his professional debut with Famalicão in a 2017–18 Taça da Liga match against Santa Clara.

On 25 August 2020, Fernandinho signed for Armenian Premier League club Lori.
