= Pavel Osipov =

Russian footballer

Personal information
- Full name: Pavel Fyodorovich Osipov
- Date of birth: 28 January 1996 (age 30)
- Place of birth: Saint Petersburg, Russia
- Height: 1.75 m (5 ft 9 in)
- Position: Midfielder

Senior career*
Years	Team	Apps	(Gls)
2013–2016	Zenit-2 Saint Petersburg	11	(0)
2016	→ Lahti (loan)	12	(1)
2017–2018	Lahti	27	(4)
2019–2020	Ventspils	16	(1)
2020–2021	Lori	13	(1)
2021	SKA Rostov-on-Don	7	(0)
- * Club domestic league appearances and goals

Pavel Fyodorovich Osipov (Russian: Павел Фёдорович Осипов; born 28 January 1996) is a Russian former football midfielder.

== Club career ==
He made his debut in the Russian Professional Football League for FC Zenit-2 Saint Petersburg on 4 August 2013 in a game against FC Torpedo Vladimir.

== Career statistics ==
As of 13 May 2025

Appearances and goals by club, season and competition
Club	Season	League			National cup (Note: Includes Suomen Cup, Latvian Cup, Armenian Independence Cup and Russian Cup)		Europe		Total	
Club	Season	Division	Apps	Goals	Apps	Goals	Apps	Goals	Apps	Goals
Zenit-2	2013–14	Russian Second League	3	0	–		–		3	0
Zenit-2	2015–16	Russian First League	6	0	–		–		6	0
Zenit-2	2016–17	Russian First League	2	0	–		–		2	0
Zenit-2	Total		11	0	0	0	0	0	11	0
Lahti (loan)	2016	Veikkausliiga	12	1	–		–		12	1
Lahti	2017	Veikkausliiga	0	0	4	1	–		4	1
Lahti	2018	Veikkausliiga	27	4	5	2	2 (Note: Appearances in UEFA Europa League)	0	34	6
Lahti	Total		27	4	9	3	2	0	38	7
Ventspils	2019	Virslīga	16	1	1	0	6	0	23	1
Lori	2020–21	Armenian Premier League	13	1	2	1	–		15	2
SKA Rostov-on-Don	2021–22	Russian Second League	8	0	1	0	–		9	0
Career total			87	7	13	4	8	0	108	11
