= Arsen Siukayev =

Russian footballer

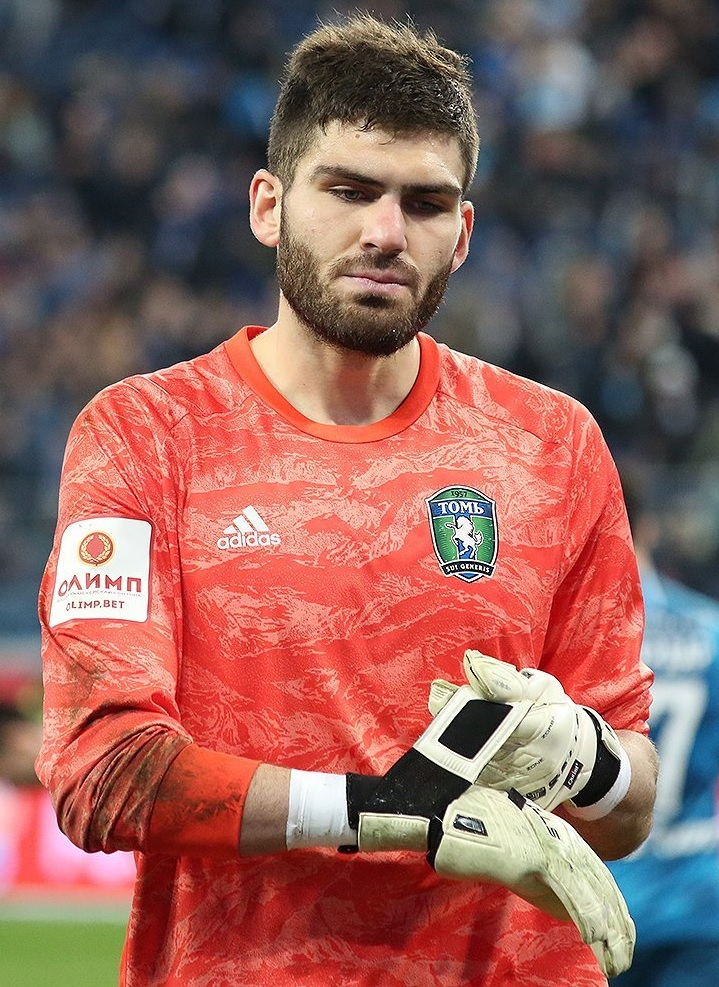
- Siukayev with Tom Tomsk in 2019

Personal information
- Full name: Arsen Ibragimovich Siukayev
- Date of birth: 7 March 1996 (age 30)
- Place of birth: Vladikavkaz, Russia
- Height: 1.96 m (6 ft 5 in)
- Position: Goalkeeper

Team information
- Current team: Samgurali Tskaltubo
- Number: 21

Senior career*
Years	Team	Apps	(Gls)
2013–2014	Kuban Krasnodar	0	(0)
2014–2015	Kaluga	2	(0)
2016	Mashuk-KMV Pyatigorsk	1	(0)
2017–2018	Biolog-Novokubansk	32	(0)
2018	Ararat-Armenia	2	(0)
2019	Lori	14	(0)
2019–2020	Tom Tomsk	0	(0)
2020–2021	Lori	0	(0)
2021	Mashuk-KMV Pyatigorsk	13	(0)
2022–2023	Spartak Nalchik	16	(0)
2023–2024	Aksu	6	(0)
2024–2025	Zhetysu	24	(0)
2025	Atyrau	8	(0)
2025	Gagra	17	(0)
2026–	Samgurali Tskaltubo	8	(0)
- * Club domestic league appearances and goals as of 07:44, 15 June 2026 (UTC)

Arsen Ibragimovich Siukayev (Russian: Арсен Ибрагимович Сиукаев; born 7 March 1996) is a Russian football player who plays for Georgian club Samgurali Tskaltubo.

== Career ==
=== Club ===
Siukayev made his professional debut in the Russian Professional Football League for Kaluga on 4 November 2014 in a game against Ryazan.

On 11 January 2019, Siukayev signed for Lori.

Siukayev played in the 2019–20 Russian Cup campaign for Tom Tomsk as they eliminated Russian Premier League club Tambov with a score of 4–0, before falling to Russian champions Zenit St. Petersburg with a score of 0–4.

On 28 August 2020, Siukayev returned to Lori, playing two cup games for the club before leaving on 13 January 2021.
