= Claudir =

Brazilian footballer (born 1992)

Personal information
- Full name: Claudir Marini Junior
- Date of birth: 6 August 1992 (age 34)
- Place of birth: Campo Grande, Brazil
- Height: 1.75 m (5 ft 9 in)
- Position: Forward

Team information
- Current team: Xagħra United
- Number: 28

Senior career*
Years	Team	Apps	(Gls)
2010–2013	Corinthians B	11	(1)
2011	→ Flamengo de Guarulhos (loan)	12	(3)
2012	→ Olaria (loan)	6	(0)
2013	→ Londrina (loan)	0	(0)
2014	Guaratinguetá	11	(0)
2015	Rondonópolis	0	(0)
2015	Cianorte	0	(0)
2016	Atlético Sorocaba	17	(6)
2016–2018	Colorado	0	(0)
2016	→ São Paulo (loan)	5	(0)
2016–2017	→ Gandzasar (loan)	27	(8)
2017–2018	→ Esteghlal Khuzestan (loan)	21	(4)
2018–2019	Padideh	0	(0)
2019–2020	PSIS Semarang	14	(3)
2020	Hapoel Ramat Gan	5	(0)
2020–2021	Lori	13	(3)
2021	Sevan	13	(2)
2022	Al-Yarmouk	8	(3)
2022	SHB Da Nang	11	(2)
2023–2025	Burgan	5	(3)
2025	Marsa	8	(0)
2025–	Xagħra United	15	(1)
- * Club domestic league appearances and goals as of 21 April 2025

Claudir Marini Junior (born 6 August 6, 1992) is a Brazilian footballer who plays as a forward for Gozo Football League First Division club Xagħra United.

== Career ==
On 19 September 2020, Claudir returned to the Armenian Premier League, signing for Lori on a one-year contract, with the option of an additional year.

On 17 June 2021, Claudir signed for Sevan.

== Career statistics ==
=== Club ===
As of match played 27 November 2019

Appearances and goals by club, season and competition
Club	Season	League			National Cup		Continental		Other		Total	
Club	Season	Division	Apps	Goals	Apps	Goals	Apps	Goals	Apps	Goals	Apps	Goals
São Paulo	2016	Série D	5	0	–		–		–		5	0
São Paulo	2017	Série D	0	0	–		–		–		0	0
São Paulo	Total		5	0	0	0	0	0	0	0	5	0
Gandzasar Kapan (loan)	2016–17	Armenian Premier League	27	8	2	0	–		–		29	8
Gandzasar Kapan (loan)	2017–18	Armenian Premier League	0	0	0	0	2	0	–		2	0
Gandzasar Kapan (loan)	Total		27	8	2	0	2	0	0	0	31	8
Esteghlal Khuzestan	2017–18	Persian Gulf Pro League	21	4	0	0	–		–		21	4
PSIS Semarang	2019	Liga 1	14	3	0	0	–		3	2	17	5
Career total			67	15	2	0	2	0	3	2	74	17
