= Naor Abudi =

Israeli footballer

Personal information
- Full name: Naor Abudi
- Date of birth: July 17, 1993 (age 33)
- Place of birth: Kiryat Shmona, Israel
- Position: Attacking midfielder

Team information
- Current team: Hapoel Tirat HaCarmel

Youth career
- Ironi Kiryat Shmona

Senior career*
Years	Team	Apps	(Gls)
2012–2018	Ironi Kiryat Shmona	23	(0)
2014–2015	→ Hapoel Nazareth Illit	38	(5)
2016–2018	→ Ironi Nesher	61	(8)
2018–2019	Hapoel Acre	25	(1)
2019–2020	Ashdod	7	(0)
2020	Lori	8	(1)
2021	Hapoel Umm al-Fahm	14	(0)
2021–2022	Hapoel Afula	20	(1)
2022–2023	Hapoel Nof HaGalil	9	(1)
2024	Hapoel Lod	17	(2)
2024	F.C. Dimona	0	(0)
2024–	Hapoel Tirat HaCarmel	8	(4)
- * Club domestic league appearances and goals as of 1 June 2024

Naor Abudi (Hebrew: נאור עבודי; born July 17, 1993) is an Israeli footballer who plays as an attacking midfielder for Israeli club Hapoel Tirat HaCarmel.
