= Filip Kukuličić =

Montenegrin footballer

Personal information
- Date of birth: 13 February 1996 (age 30)
- Place of birth: Podgorica, FR Yugoslavia
- Height: 1.90 m (6 ft 3 in)
- Position: Forward

Youth career
- Zeta

Senior career*
Years	Team	Apps	(Gls)
2012–2017	Zeta	111	(14)
2017–2018	Iskra Danilovgrad	34	(6)
2018–2019	Zemun	26	(6)
2019	Grafičar Beograd	16	(3)
2020	Aluminij	4	(1)
2022	Mačva Šabac	14	(1)

International career
2012	Montenegro U17	3	(0)
2014–2015	Montenegro U19	5	(0)
2015–2017	Montenegro U21	3	(1)
- * Club domestic league appearances and goals as of 18 June 2022

Filip Kukuličić (Cyrillic: Филип Кукуличић; born 13 February 1996) is a Montenegrin professional footballer who plays as a forward.

== Club career ==
Kukuličić made his senior debut with Zeta in the 2012–13 Montenegrin First League. He spent six years at the club. In summer 2017, Kukuličić was transferred to Iskra. He spent just one years at the club, before moving to Serbia and joining to Zemun.

== International career ==
He made one appearance for Montenegro at Montenegro U19.

== Honours ==
Zeta

- Montenegrin First League runner-up: 2016–17
