= Yevgeni Skoblikov =

Russian footballer

Personal information
- Full name: Yevgeni Georgiyevich Skoblikov
- Date of birth: 10 July 1990 (age 36)
- Place of birth: Vladivostok, Russian SFSR
- Height: 1.74 m (5 ft 8 1/2 in)
- Position: Midfielder

Youth career
- Konoplyov football academy

Senior career*
Years	Team	Apps	(Gls)
2006–2007	Krylia Sovetov-SOK Dimitrovgrad	1	(0)
2008–2009	Togliatti	53	(6)
2010	Akademiya Togliatti	23	(4)
2011–2015	Luch-Energiya Vladivostok	25	(0)
2011	→ Mostovik-Primorye Ussuriysk (loan)	2	(0)
2012	→ Volga Ulyanovsk (loan)	9	(0)
2013	→ Volga Ulyanovsk (loan)	2	(0)
2018–2019	Yerevan		
2019–2020	Belshina Bobruisk	18	(3)
2020–2021	Lori	15	(1)
- * Club domestic league appearances and goals

Yevgeni Georgiyevich Skoblikov (Russian: Евгений Георгиевич Скобликов; born 10 July 1990) is a Russian former professional football player.

== Club career ==
Skoblikov made his Russian Football National League debut for FC Luch-Energiya Vladivostok on 19 July 2014 in a game against PFC Sokol Saratov.

On 9 September 2020, Lori FC announced the signing of Skoblikov to a one-year contract.
