= Lori FC =

Armenian football club

Lori Լոռի
- Full name: Lori Football Club
- Founded: 1936; 90 years ago
- Dissolved: July 2021
- Ground: Vanadzor Football Academy (temporary); Vanadzor City Stadium (under construction)
- Capacity: 1,000; 4,000 (upon completion)
- Owner: Tovmas Grigoryan
- President: Robert Grigoryan
- Manager: Albert Solomonov
- League: Armenian Premier League
- 2020–21: Armenian Premier League, 8th
- Website: fclori.am
Home colours	Away colours

Lori FC (Armenian: Լոռի Ֆուտբոլային Ակումբ) was an Armenian football club based in Vanadzor, Lori Province. Originally founded in 1936, Lori has participated in the domestic football competition of Soviet Armenia. After retiring from professional football in 2002, the club was revived in 2017 winning the 2017–18 Armenian First League competition.

== History ==
The club participated in the first ever Armenian football competition after the split-up from the Soviet Union. After the regular competition, they did not qualify for the championship stage, but were forced to play in the relegation stage. Here they finished in the seventh position, which forced them to play in the Armenian First League (second level) for the 1993 season. In that season they finished first in their group (the league was split up into two groups) which gave them promotion to the Armenian Premier League. Lori then became a yo-yo team referring to their up-and-go history of promotion and relegation. In 2002 they played their last season in the Premier League before being disbanded.

The reestablishment of Lori FC was officially announced on 2 March 2017, by Tovmas Grigoryan; a native businessman of the city of Vanadzor. The club made its debut at professional football through the 2017–18 Armenian First League competition.

The club used the Vanadzor Football Academy as their training ground. The academy was temporarily being used as a home ground for their official matches in the Armenian First League competition, as the Vanadzor City Stadium was (currently) being reconstructed and set to be ready during summer 2019.

On 18 June 2019, David Campaña was appointed as the new manager of Lori on a contract until the summer of 2020. On 2 June 2020, Lori announced that manager David Campaña and his assistants Francisco Compan, Jorge Gomez, Agustin Perez and Enrique Gil had all left the club as their contracts could not be extended due to travel restrictions in returning to Armenia due to the COVID-19 pandemic. Later the same day, Armen Sanamyan was announced as Lori's caretaker manager. On 4 August 2020, Armen Sanamyan left Lori to become manager of Sevan, with Lori announcing Albert Solomonov as their new manager on 5 August 2020, with Solomonov signing a one-year contract.

Following a disagreement with the administrative decision to awarded FC Urartu a 3–0 victory over Lori due to Lori being unable to field a team for their match due to COVID-19, Lori walked off at the start of their match against Ararat Yerevan on 16 March 2021. Lori later submitted their resignation from the Premier League on 5 April 2021.

=== League and cup ===
Lori FC league record since 1987:

Season	League									National Cup	Top goalscorer		Managers
Season	Div.	Pos.	Pl.	W	D	L	GS	GA	Pts	National Cup	Name	League	Managers
1987	Soviet Second League	12	30	12	4	14	31	34	28				
1988	Soviet Second League	12	38	17	5	16	49	54	39				
1989	Soviet Second League	6	42	23	5	14	66	54	51				
1990	Soviet Second League	18	50	17	10	23	47	59	44				
1991	Soviet Second League	22	42	12	5	25	32	98	29				
1992	Armenian Premier League	19	22	9	4	9	45	63	22	1/8 Final			
1993	Armenian First League	1	20	13	4	3	46	7	30	1/16 Final			
1994	Armenian Premier League	13	28	5	6	17	22	65	16	1/16 Final			
1995	Armenian First League	4	12	6	0	6	24	16	18	did not participate			
1995/96	Armenian First League	3	22	12	6	4	33	16	42	1/16 Final			
1996/97	Armenian First League	2	22	15	5	2	42	13	50	1/8 Final			
1997	Armenian Premier League	10	18	0	1	17	7	76	1	-			
1998	Armenian First League	2	24	16	6	2	42	16	54	1/8 Final			
1999	Armenian First League	3	16	9	4	3	32	10	31	1/8 Final			
2000	Armenian First League	3	16	9	2	5	34	24	29	1/8 Final			
2001	Armenian Premier League	12	22	1	2	19	17	83	5	1/8 Final			
2002	Armenian Premier League	12	22	1	2	19	15	100	5	1/8 Final			
2003	Armenian First League	10	22	5	0	17	36	74	15	did not participate			
2004	Armenian First League	14	30	7	6	17	35	68	24	Preliminary round			
2005	Armenian First League	11	24	6	0	18	39	77	18	did not participate			
2006–2017	No Participation												
2017–18	Armenian First League	1	27	22	3	2	74	16	69	did not participate	(Ghana) Tinga Kofi Tei	12	(Armenia) Armen Adamyan
2018–19	Armenian Premier League	5	32	11	11	10	42	40	44	Runner-up	(Haiti) Jonel Désiré	17	(Armenia) Armen Adamyan (Armenia) Artur Petrosyan (Armenia) Vahe Gevorgyan
2019–20	Armenian Premier League	5	28	10	10	8	35	36	40	Quarter-final	(Haiti) Jonel Désiré	12	(Spain) David Campaña (Armenia) Armen Sanamyan (Caretaker)
2020–21	Armenian Premier League	8	24	7	2	15	16	44	23	First Round	(Brazil) Claudir	3	(Israel) Albert Solomonov
2021-present	No Participation												

== Last squad ==
As of 2 July 2021

Note: Flags indicate national team as defined under FIFA eligibility rules; some limited exceptions apply. Players may hold more than one non-FIFA nationality.

No.	Pos.	Nation	Player
2	DF	GHA	Nana Antwi
4	DF	ARM	Derenik Sargsyan
7	FW	ARM	Ghukas Poghosyan
8	DF	ARM	Aram Kocharyan
9	FW	SRB	Nikola Tripković
10	FW	ARM	Vardan Bakalyan
11	MF	POR	Fernandinho
13	GK	ARM	David Davtyan
14	MF	BRA	Victor Cesar
17	DF	RUS	Yevgeni Kirisov
18	DF	ARM	Arsen Yeghiazaryan
19	DF	SRB	Ivan Božović

No.	Pos.	Nation	Player
21	DF	ARM	Artur Avagyan
22	GK	ARM	Gor Manukyan
23	MF	ARM	Davit Paremuzyan
28	FW	BRA	Claudir
32	GK	MNE	Nemanja Šćekić
40	DF	BRA	Luiz Matheus
73	MF	RUS	Pavel Osipov
88	MF	BRA	André Mensalão
90	MF	RUS	Yevgeni Skoblikov
94	MF	SRB	Nikola Popović
99	FW	MNE	Filip Kukuličić

== Personnel ==
- Owner: (Armenia) Tovmas Grigoryan
- President: (Armenia) Robert Grigoryan
- Vice President: (Armenia) Vahan Danielyan
- CEO: (Armenia) Artur Hovhannisyan
- General Manager: (Armenia) Spartak Petrosyan
- Head coach: (Israel) Albert Solomonov
- Assistant coach: (Ukraine) Vitaliy Starovik
- Assistant coach: (Russia) Sergei Chikishev
- Goalkeepers Coach: (Armenia) Slavik Sukiasyan
- Fitness coach: (Ukraine) Roman Chupryna
- Doctor: (Armenia) Hovsep Petrosyan
- Physiotherapist: (Armenia) Arshak Tumanyan

== Former players ==
- (Lebanon) Danny El-Hage

== Managerial history ==
Managers of Lori FC since the club revived in 2017:

As of match played 8 March 2021

Name	Nat.	From	To	P	W	D	L	GS	GA	%W	Honours	Notes
Armen Adamyan	Armenia	1 July 2017	13 December 2018	44	29	7	8	99	37	65.91	Armenian First League (1)	
Artur Petrosyan	Armenia	25 December 2018	8 May 2019	14	4	6	4	14	11	28.57		
Vahe Gevorgyan	Armenia	8 May 2019	19 June 2019	4	1	2	1	6	6	25.00		
David Campaña	Spain	30 June 2019	2 June 2020	20	9	6	5	30	23	45.00		
Armen Sanamyan (Caretaker)	Armenia	2 June 2020	4 August 2020	8	1	4	3	6	12	12.50		
Albert Solomonov	Israel	5 August 2020		17	7	4	6	17	19	41.18		
