= 2018–19 Lori FC season =

Lori
2018–19 season
- Chairman: Tovmas Grigoryan
- Manager: Armen Adamyan (until 13 December); Artur Petrosyan (25 December-12 May); Vahe Gevorgyan (Caretaker) (from 12 May)
- Stadium: Vanadzor Football Academy
- Armenian Premier League: 5th
- Armenian Cup: Runners Up
- Top goalscorer: League: Jonel Désiré (17); All: Jonel Désiré (17)

The 2018–19 season was Lori FC's first season in the Armenian Premier League since their reestablishment in March 2017. They finished the season 5th in the league and were runners up to Alashkert in the Armenian Cup.

== Season events ==
On 13 December 2018, Armen Adamyan resigned as manager, with Artur Petrosyan being appointed as his successor on 25 December 2018. On 12 May, Petrosyan resigned with Vahe Gevorgyan being appointed as Caretaker Manager.

Ahead of Lori's Armenian Cup semifinal second leg on 22 April, Banants owner, Jevan Cheloian, removed his team from the pitch prior to kick-off in protest of the appointment of Gevorg Eghoyan as referee.

== Squad ==
As of match played 30 May 2019

Number	Name	Nationality	Position	Date of birth (age)	Signed from	Signed in	Contract ends	Apps.	Goals
Goalkeepers
12	Samvel Hunanyan	(Armenia)	GK	14 July 1995 (aged 23)	Pyunik	2017		14	0
33	Danylo Ryabenko	(Ukraine)	GK	9 October 1998 (aged 20)	Stal Kamianske	2018		3	0
77	Arsen Siukayev	(Russia)	GK	7 March 1996 (aged 23)	Ararat-Armenia	2019	2019	16	0
Defenders
2	Nana Antwi	(Ghana)	DF	10 August 2000 (aged 18)	Accra Young Wise	2018	2021	33	1
3	Alex Kakuba	(Uganda)	DF	12 June 1991 (aged 27)	PAS Giannina	2019		12	0
4	Murad Asatryan	(Armenia)	DF	8 February 1996 (aged 23)	Pyunik	2017		24	0
6	Annan Mensah	(Ghana)	DF	6 July 1996 (aged 22)	Cheetah FC	2017		48	5
15	Deou Dosa	(Nigeria)	DF	6 July 1996 (aged 22)		2018	2021	34	0
16	Ekereuke Ekemini	(Nigeria)	DF	29 July 1998 (aged 20)		2018	2021	7	0
18	Artyom Khachaturov	(Armenia)	DF	18 June 1992 (aged 26)	Zimbru Chișinău	2018		41	2
22	Hayk Ishkhanyan	(Armenia)	DF	24 June 1989 (aged 29)	Gandzasar Kapan	2019	2019	16	0
99	Arman Mkrtchyan	(Armenia)	DF	9 July 1999 (aged 19)	Pyunik	2017		38	0
Midfielders
5	Julius Ufuoma	(Nigeria)	MF	14 February 2000 (aged 19)	loan from P Sports Academy	2019	2019	6	0
7	Vladimir Babayan	(Armenia)	MF	6 May 1997 (aged 22)	AC Alcanenense	2019	2019	1	0
8	Aram Kocharyan	(Armenia)	MF	5 March 1996 (aged 23)	Lokomotiv Yerevan	2019	2019	11	0
10	Isah Aliyu	(Nigeria)	MF	8 August 1999 (aged 19)	Remo Stars	2018		47	10
14	Udoh Etop	(Nigeria)	MF	11 November 1999 (aged 19)		2018	2021	16	1
17	Ugochukwu Iwu	(Nigeria)	MF	28 November 1999 (aged 19)	Elkanemi Academy	2018		48	8
20	Ubong Friday	(Nigeria)	MF	3 March 1998 (aged 21)	Akwa United	2019	2022	9	0
Forwards
9	Enock Darko	(Ghana)	FW	9 September 2000 (aged 18)	Golden Kick	2019	2022	15	0
11	Alexandru Osipov	(Moldova)	FW	30 July 2000 (aged 18)	Sheriff Tiraspol	2019	2019	8	0
19	Nwani Ikechukwu	(Nigeria)	FW	17 October 1998 (aged 20)	loan from Nasarawa United	2019	2020	6	2
26	Sunday Ingbede	(Nigeria)	FW	23 April 1998 (aged 21)	Plateau United	2018		26	8
27	Stephane Adjuman	(Ivory Coast)	FW	18 November 1998 (aged 20)	ASEC Mimosas	2018	2019	21	1
97	Jonel Désiré	(Haiti)	FW	12 February 1997 (aged 22)	Mirebalais	2018	2019	30	17
Away on loan
21	Francis Nwankwo	(Nigeria)	FW	14 December 1998 (aged 20)	Remo Stars	2018	2021	9	3
Left during the season
1	Aleksandar Konov	(Bulgaria)	GK	3 September 1993 (aged 25)	Oborishte Panagyurishte	2018		15	0
5	Richard Botchway	(Ghana)	DF			2018		3	0
7	David Aslanyan	(Armenia)	MF	7 August 1994 (aged 24)	Gandzasar Kapan	2017		27	5
8	Vigen Avetisyan	(Armenia)	FW	12 January 1993 (aged 26)	Ulisses	2017		33	12
9	Areg Azatyan	(Armenia)	FW	29 June 1990 (aged 28)	Gandzasar Kapan	2018		29	7
11	Kirill Volchkov	(Russia)	MF	21 March 1996 (aged 23)	Kuban-2 Krasnodar	2018		4	0
13	Gor Elyazyan	(Armenia)	GK	1 June 1991 (aged 27)	Ararat Yerevan	2017		20	0
19	Stepan Harutyunyan	(Armenia)	MF	11 July 1997 (aged 21)	Banants	2018		15	0
20	Aram Adamyan	(Armenia)	MF	11 September 1997 (aged 21)	Stal Kamianske	2018		23	6
22	Vardan Movsisyan	(Armenia)	FW	18 August 1991 (aged 27)	Mika	2017		30	4
30	Ibrahim Fuseini	(Ghana)	MF	10 January 2000 (aged 19)	Zein United	2018		29	0

=== Out on loan ===
Note: Flags indicate national team as defined under FIFA eligibility rules; some limited exceptions apply. Players may hold more than one non-FIFA nationality.

No.	Pos.	Nation	Player
21	FW	NGA	Francis Nwankwo (at Junior Sevan)

== Transfers ==
=== In ===
Date	Position	Nationality	Name	From	Fee	Ref.
27 July 2018	DF	(Nigeria)	Deou Dosa		Free	
27 July 2018	DF	(Nigeria)	Ekereuke Ekemini		Free	
27 July 2018	MF	(Nigeria)	Udoh Etop		Free	
3 August 2018	MF	(Russia)	Kirill Volchkov	Kuban-2 Krasnodar	Undisclosed	
6 August 2018	GK	(Bulgaria)	Aleksandar Konov	Oborishte Panagyurishte	Undisclosed	
28 August 2018	GK	(Ukraine)	Danylo Ryabenko	Stal Kamianske	Undisclosed	
28 August 2018	FW	(Nigeria)	Francis Nwankwo	Remo Stars	Undisclosed	
29 August 2018	DF	(Ghana)	Nana Antwi	Accra Young Wise	Undisclosed	
29 August 2018	FW	(Nigeria)	Sunday Ingbede	Plateau United	Undisclosed	
31 August 2018	FW	(Ivory Coast)	Stephane Adjuman	ASEC Mimosas	Undisclosed	
	DF	(Ghana)	Richard Botchway		Free	
11 January 2019	GK	(Russia)	Arsen Siukayev	Ararat-Armenia	Undisclosed	
12 January 2019	MF	(Armenia)	Aram Kocharyan	Lokomotiv Yerevan	Undisclosed	
8 February 2019	DF	(Armenia)	Hayk Ishkhanyan	Gandzasar Kapan	Undisclosed	
11 February 2019	FW	(Moldova)	Alexandru Osipov	Sheriff Tiraspol	Undisclosed	
11 February 2019	MF	(Armenia)	Vladimir Babayan	Alcanenense	Undisclosed	
21 February 2019	FW	(Ghana)	Enock Darko	Golden Kick	Free	
5 March 2019	MF	(Nigeria)	Ubong Friday	Akwa United	Free	
27 March 2019	DF	(Uganda)	Alex Kakuba	PAS Giannina	Free	

=== Loans in ===
Date	Position	Nationality	Name	From	Date to	Ref.
3 July 2018	FW	(Haiti)	Jonel Désiré	AS Mirebalais	18 July 2019	
28 March 2019	MF	(Nigeria)	Julius Ufuoma	P Sports Academy	31 December 2019	
29 March 2019	FW	(Nigeria)	Nwani Ikechukwu	Nasarawa United	30 June 2020	

=== Loans out ===
Date	Position	Nationality	Name	From	Date to	Ref.
4 March 2019	FW	(Nigeria)	Francis Nwankwo	Junior Sevan	End of Season	

=== Released ===
Date	Position	Nationality	Name	Joined	Date	Date
30 June 2018	DF	(Ghana)	Yussif Oyuma			
30 June 2018	MF	(Ghana)	Tinga Kofi Tei			
30 June 2018	FW	(Nigeria)	Michael Akpala			
31 October 2018	MF	(Russia)	Kirill Volchkov	SpVgg Vreden	1 July 2019	
8 January 2019	GK	(Armenia)	Gor Elyazyan	Retired		
8 January 2019	DF	(Armenia)	Vardan Movsisyan	Artsakh		
10 January 2019	DF	(Ghana)	Richard Botchway			
10 January 2019	MF	(Armenia)	David Aslanyan	Lokomotiv Yerevan		
10 January 2019	FW	(Armenia)	Vigen Avetisyan	Artsakh	12 January 2019	
10 January 2019	FW	(Armenia)	Areg Azatyan	Sevan		
1 February 2019	MF	(Armenia)	Aram Adamyan			
1 February 2019	MF	(Armenia)	Stepan Harutyunyan	Ararat Yerevan	1 February 2019	
9 March 2019	GK	(Bulgaria)	Aleksandar Konov	Retired		
17 May 2019	MF	(Ghana)	Ibrahim Fuseini			
30 June 2019	GK	(Ukraine)	Danylo Ryabenko	CSKA Pamir Dushanbe		
30 June 2019	GK	(Armenia)	Samvel Hunanyan	Aragats		
30 June 2019	DF	(Armenia)	Hayk Ishkhanyan	Alashkert	21 June 2019	
30 June 2019	DF	(Armenia)	Murad Asatryan	Aragats		
30 June 2019	DF	(Nigeria)	Deou Dosa	Van		
30 June 2019	DF	(Nigeria)	Ekereuke Ekemini	Akwa United		
30 June 2019	DF	(Uganda)	Alex Kakuba	Cova da Piedade		
30 June 2019	MF	(Armenia)	Vladimir Babayan	Yerevan		
30 June 2019	MF	(Nigeria)	Udoh Etop	JS Kairouan		
30 June 2019	MF	(Nigeria)	Ubong Friday	Akwa United		
30 June 2019	FW	(Ivory Coast)	Stephane Adjuman	Gandzasar Kapan	24 August 2019	
30 June 2019	FW	(Moldova)	Alexandru Osipov	Leixões		
30 June 2019	FW	(Nigeria)	Francis Nwankwo	Sevan		

== Competitions ==
=== Armenian Premier League ===
==== Result summary ====
Overall								Home						Away					
Pld	W	D	L	GF	GA	GD	Pts	W	D	L	GF	GA	GD	W	D	L	GF	GA	GD
32	11	11	10	42	40	+2	44	6	5	5	24	22	+2	5	6	5	18	18	0

Last updated: 30 May 2019.
Source: Results

==== Results ====
4 August 2018 1	Lori	0 – 2	Ararat-Armenia	Vanadzor
17:00 (UTC+4)	Iwu (yellow card) 64'	Report	Dimitrov 67'; Guz (yellow card) 71'; Kobyalko (yellow card) 84'; Mkoyan 86' (pen.)	Stadium: Vanadzor Football Academy; Attendance: 500; Referee: Suren Baliyan

12 August 2018 2	Shirak	1 – 1	Lori	Gyumri
17:00 (UTC+4)	Cruz 43'; Mikaelyan (yellow card) 48'; A.Shakhnazaryan (yellow card) 79'; Arreola (yellow card) 82'	Report	I.Fuseini (yellow card) 53'; Désiré (yellow card) 79'; U.Etop 85' (yellow card) 90'	Stadium: Gyumri City Stadium; Attendance: 500; Referee: Zaven Hovhannisyan

18 August 2018 3	Lori	3 – 2	Artsakh	Vanadzor
16:30 (UTC+4)	Désiré 29', 43'; V.Avetisyan 49'; A.Mkrtchyan (yellow card) 80'	Report	A.Petrosyan (yellow card) 52'; G.Aghekyan 70'; V.Movsisyan 74' (o.g.)	Stadium: Vanadzor Football Academy; Attendance: 300; Referee: Artur Safaryan

22 August 2018 4	Banants	1 – 3	Lori	Yerevan
16:30 (UTC+4)	Kpodo (yellow card) 4'; Solovyov 74'	Report	I.Fuseini (yellow card) 40'; Désiré 61'; Aliyu 68'; Iwu 86' (pen.)	Stadium: Banants Stadium; Attendance: 500; Referee: Zaven Hovhannisyan

29 August 2018 5	Lori	1 – 0	Ararat Yerevan	Vanadzor
16:00 (UTC+4)	Iwu (yellow card) 67'; A.Azatyan (yellow card) 76'; U.Etop (yellow card) 81'; Désiré 88'	Report	G.Kirakosyan (yellow card) 63'; Malyaka (yellow card) 77'	Stadium: Vanadzor Football Academy; Attendance: 400; Referee: Artur Safaryan

1 September 2018 6	Pyunik	0 – 3	Lori	Yerevan
16:00 (UTC+4)	Trusevych (yellow card) 50'; Kolychev (yellow card) 65'	Report	Aliyu 3', 27'; Ingbede 6'	Stadium: Vazgen Sargsyan Republican Stadium; Attendance: 500; Referee: Zaven Hovhannisyan

15 September 2018 7	Lori	3 – 0	Gandzasar Kapan	Vanadzor
16:00 (UTC+4)	S.Adjuman 7'; Ingbede 67'; Aliyu 85'	Report	Sverchinskiy (yellow card) 15'; G.Nranyan (yellow card) 23'; Wbeymar (yellow card) 45'; M.Manasyan (yellow card) 58'; A.Khachatryan (yellow card) 71'	Stadium: Vanadzor Football Academy; Attendance: 1,000; Referee: Zaven Hovhannisyan

22 September 2018 8	Alashkert	2 – 1	Lori	Yerevan
16:00 (UTC+4)	Jefferson 65', 69' (yellow card) 70'; Zeljković (yellow card) 87'; T.Voskanyan (yellow card) 90+3'	Report	Ingbede 23' (yellow card) 85'; Antwi (yellow card) 45' (yellow-red card) 61'; I.Fuseini (yellow card) 72'	Stadium: Alashkert Stadium; Attendance: 500; Referee: Artur Simonyan

29 September 2018 9	Ararat-Armenia	0 – 0	Lori	Yerevan
18:00 (UTC+4)	Pashov (yellow card) 64'; Hovhannisyan (yellow card) 83'; Ambartsumyan (yellow card) 90+2'	Report	D.Dosa (yellow card) 11'	Stadium: Yerevan Football Academy Stadium; Attendance: 1,000; Referee: Suren Baliyan

7 October 2018 10	Lori	3 – 1	Shirak	Vanadzor
14:00 (UTC+4)	Khachaturov 12' (yellow card) 77'; Ingbede 60'; Désiré 71' (pen.)	Report	Bougouhi (yellow card) 40'; A.Muradyan 81'; A.Shakhnazaryan (yellow card) 85'; M.Bakayoko (yellow card) 90+1'	Stadium: Vanadzor Football Academy; Attendance: 600; Referee: Gevorg Eghoyan

20 October 2018 11	Artsakh	2 – 3	Lori	Yerevan
14:00 (UTC+4)	E.Avagyan 8' (yellow card) 65'; H.Poghosyan (yellow card) 11'; A.Grigoryan (yellow card) 37'; A.Bakhtiyarov 90+3'	Report	Désiré 23', 88'; Aliyu 76'; D.Dosa (yellow card) 90+1'	Stadium: Mika Stadium; Attendance: 400; Referee: Zaven Hovhannisyan

28 October 2018 12	Lori	1 – 3	Banants	Vanadzor
15:00 (UTC+4)	V.Avetisyan 2'; Iwu (yellow card) 74'; Antwi (yellow card) 76'; G.Elyazyan (yellow card) 83'	Report	Gultyayev (yellow card) 3'; Udo (yellow card) 31'; Wal 58', 71' (pen.); A.Avagyan (yellow card) 82'; A.Abdullahi (yellow card) 90'; A.Bareghamyan 90+2'	Stadium: Vanadzor Football Academy; Attendance: 700; Referee: Suren Baliyan

4 November 2018 13	Ararat Yerevan	2 – 2	Lori	Yerevan
15:00 (UTC+4)	S.Metoyan 74'; G.Poghosyan 90+4'; V.Arzoyan (yellow card) 90+5'	Report	Désiré 65' (pen.) (yellow card) 90+5'; I.Fuseini (yellow card) 78'; F.Nwankwo 86'; Aliyu (yellow card) 90+2'	Stadium: Alashkert Stadium; Attendance: 300; Referee: Artur Safaryan

11 November 2018 14	Lori	0 – 1	Pyunik	Vanadzor
14:00 (UTC+4)	Iwu (yellow card) 65'; Aliyu (yellow card) 65'; S.Adjuman (yellow card) 67'; I.Fuseini (yellow card) 76'	Report	Hovsepyan 58' (yellow card) 65'; A.Arakelyan (yellow card) 65'; V.Hayrapetyan (yellow card) 65'; Dmitriyev (yellow card) 78'; A.Kartashyan (yellow card) 90+1'	Stadium: Vanadzor Football Academy; Attendance: 600; Referee: Gevorg Eghoyan

25 November 2018 15	Gandzasar Kapan	2 – 0	Lori	Yerevan
14:00 (UTC+4)	V.Minasyan (yellow card) 57'; Musonda 68'; G.Nranyan (yellow card) 87'; M.Manasyan 90+1' (pen.)	Report	Antwi (yellow card) 16'; M.Asatryan (yellow card) 58'; I.Fuseini (yellow card) 60'; S.Harutyunyan (yellow card) 89'	Stadium: Yerevan Football Academy Stadium; Attendance: 200; Referee: Zaven Hovhannisyan

28 November 2018 16	Lori	1 – 1	Alashkert	Vanadzor
14:00 (UTC+4)	Iwu 32' (pen.)	Report	Sekulić (yellow card) 12'; Zeljković (yellow card) 31' (goal) 52'; Romero (yellow card) 88'; Stojković (yellow card) 90+2'	Stadium: Vanadzor Football Academy; Attendance: 500; Referee: Suren Baliyan

1 December 2018 17	Lori	0 – 1	Ararat-Armenia	Vanadzor
14:00 (UTC+4)	D.Dosa (yellow card) 74'; A.Mensah (yellow card) 87'	Report	Kobyalko 49' (yellow card) 52'; Shaghoyan (yellow card) 88'	Stadium: Vanadzor Football Academy; Attendance: 300; Referee: Artur Simonyan

3 March 2019 18	Shirak	0 – 0	Lori	Gyumri
14:00 (UTC+4)	Shabani (yellow card) 70'	Report		Stadium: Gyumri City Stadium; Attendance: 150; Referee: Artur Simonyan

6 March 2019 19	Lori	2 – 0	Artsakh	Vanadzor
15:00 (UTC+4)	Désiré 11', 59' (pen.)	Report	V.Bakalyan (yellow card) 59'; E.Yeghiazaryan (yellow card) 72'	Stadium: Vanadzor Football Academy; Attendance: 500; Referee: Artur Safaryan

11 March 2019 20	Banants	0 – 0	Lori	Yerevan
14:00 (UTC+4)	Gadzhibekov (yellow card) 60'; H. Hakobyan (yellow card) 68'; Voskanyan (yellow card) 69'	Report		Stadium: Banants Stadium; Attendance: 200; Referee: Zaven Hovhannisyan

31 March 2019 21	Lori	2 – 2	Ararat Yerevan	Yerevan
15:00 (UTC+4)	Antwi 26'; Désiré 39'; Iwu (yellow card) 45+1'	Report	V.Arzoyan 60'; S.Metoyan 69'; M.Guyganov (yellow card) 74'; R.Hakobyan (yellow card) 79'	Stadium: Pyunik Training Centre; Attendance: 200; Referee: Asot Ghaltakchyan

7 April 2019 22	Pyunik	1 – 2	Lori	Yerevan
15:00 (UTC+4)	Usman (yellow card) 43'; Hovsepyan 75' (pen.); Marku (yellow card) 79'	Report	Ingbede 29'; Désiré 56'; Siukayev (yellow card) 90+2'	Stadium: Vazgen Sargsyan Republican Stadium; Attendance: 700; Referee: Suren Baliyan

10 April 2019 23	Lori	0 – 0	Gandzasar Kapan	Vanadzor
15:00 (UTC+4)	S.Adjuman (yellow card) 31'; Désiré (yellow card) 63'; Khachaturov (yellow card) 90+4'	Report	Adamyan (yellow card) 28'; A.Karapetyan (yellow card) 36'; G.Harutyunyan (yellow card) 90+4'; G.Ohanyan (yellow card) 90+6'	Stadium: Vanadzor Football Academy; Attendance: 400; Referee: Artur Simonyan

14 April 2019 24	Alashkert	0 – 1	Lori	Yerevan
15:00 (UTC+4)		Report	Ingbede 45+1'; Aliyu (yellow card) 53'; D.Enock (yellow card) 90+2'	Stadium: Alashkert Stadium; Attendance: 700; Referee: Zaven Hovhannisyan

19 April 2019 25	Ararat-Armenia	3 – 0	Lori	Yerevan
16:00 (UTC+4)	Louis 5', 33'; Pustozyorov (yellow card) 36'; Guz (yellow card) 60'; Kobyalko 84'	Report		Stadium: Yerevan Football Academy Stadium; Attendance: 500; Referee: Suren Baliyan

28 April 2019 26	Lori	2 – 2	Shirak	Vanadzor
15:00 (UTC+4)	Désiré 32'; Ingbede (yellow card) 33'; Aliyu 58' (yellow card) 73'	Report	K.Muradyan (yellow card) 26'; M.Bakayoko 34'; A.Aslanyan (yellow card) 50'; Gevorkyan (yellow card) 82'; K.Veranyan (yellow card) 89'; Mikaelyan 90+3'	Stadium: Vanadzor Football Academy; Attendance: 500; Referee: Suren Baliyan

1 May 2019 27	Artsakh	2 – 1	Lori	Yerevan
16:00 (UTC+4)	E.Avagyan (yellow card) 56'; V.Movsisyan (yellow card) 82'; Gareginyan 89'; E.Movsesyan 90+3'	Report	Désiré 70' (pen.)	Stadium: Pyunik Training Centre; Attendance: 250; Referee: Henrik Nalbandyan

4 May 2019 28	Lori	1 – 3	Banants	Vanadzor
16:00 (UTC+4)	Aliyu (yellow card) 43'; W.Nwani 80'	Report	A.Bareghamyan 22'; Darbinyan (yellow card) 40'; K.Melkonyan 77'; A.Glisic 90+3'	Stadium: Vanadzor Football Academy; Attendance: 600; Referee: Zaven Hovhannisyan

14 May 2019 29	Ararat Yerevan	1 – 0	Lori	Yerevan
16:00 (UTC+4)	G.Poghosyan (yellow card) 45'; R.Hakobyan (yellow card) 47' (goal) 70'; Vukomanović (yellow card) 90'	Report	Ingbede (yellow card) 14'	Stadium: Banants Stadium-3; Attendance: 200; Referee: Gevorg Eghoyan

20 May 2019 30	Lori	2 – 2	Pyunik	Vanadzor
15:00 (UTC+4)	Désiré 51', 82'	Report	Hovsepyan (yellow card) 15'; Vardanyan 49'; Konaté 70'; Stezhko (yellow card) 73'; Usman (yellow card) 90+7'	Stadium: Vanadzor Football Academy; Attendance: 200; Referee: Artak Simonyan

25 May 2019 31	Gandzasar Kapan	1 – 1	Lori	Yerevan
17:00 (UTC+4)	D.Minasyan (yellow card) 14'; Al.Hovhannisyan (yellow card) 70'; G.Ohanyan 79'	Report	Désiré 42'; Antwi (yellow card) 43'; Siukayev (yellow card) 78'	Stadium: Yerevan Football Academy Stadium; Attendance: 300; Referee: Henrik Nalbandyan

30 May 2019 32	Lori	3 – 2	Alashkert	Vanadzor
17:00 (UTC+4)	Aliyu 21'; Ingbede 36'; W.Nwani 52'	Report	Hayrapetyan 42'; Stojković (yellow card) 72'; Manucharyan 90+2'	Stadium: Vanadzor Football Academy; Attendance: 130; Referee: Suren Baliyan

==== Table ====
Pos	Team	Pld	W	D	L	GF	GA	GD	Pts	Qualification or relegation
1	Ararat-Armenia (C)	32	18	7	7	53	28	+25	61	Qualification for the Champions League first qualifying round
2	Pyunik	32	18	6	8	46	32	+14	60	Qualification for the Europa League first qualifying round (Note: Alashkert qualified for the Europa League first qualifying round by winning the 2018–19 Armenian Cup.)
3	Banants	32	14	10	8	43	35	+8	52	Qualification for the Europa League first qualifying round
4	Alashkert	32	15	6	11	37	27	+10	51	Qualification for the Europa League first qualifying round
5	Lori	32	11	11	10	42	40	+2	44	
6	Gandzasar	32	10	8	14	38	33	+5	38	
7	Shirak	32	7	15	10	26	30	−4	36	
8	Artsakh	32	6	10	16	25	49	−24	28	
9	Ararat Yerevan	32	5	7	20	24	60	−36	22	

Source: Soccerway
Rules for classification: 1) Points; 2) Play-off (only if deciding champion); 3) Matches won; 4) Head-to-head points; 5) Head-to-head matches won; 6) Head-to-head goal difference; 7) Head-to-head goals scored; 8) Head-to-head away goals scored; 9) Goal difference; 10) Goals scored.
(C) Champions

=== Armenian Cup ===
20 September 2018 Last 16 1st leg	Junior Sevan	2 – 3	Lori	Dzoraghbyur
16:00 (UTC+4)	V.Uldyakov (yellow card) 22'; Cheminava (yellow card) 42'; A.Durunts 59' (pen.); Sysuyev 70'	Report	Volchkov (yellow card) 21'; A.Azatyan 26' (pen.); F.Nwankwo 41', 88'; G.Elyazyan (yellow card) 59'	Stadium: Dzoraghbyur Training Centre; Attendance: 60; Referee: Henrik Nalbandyan

4 October 2018 Last 16 2nd leg	Lori	2 – 2 (5 – 4 agg.)	Junior Sevan	Vanadzor
14:00 (UTC+4)	E.Ekemini (yellow card) 27'; A.Adamyan 35'; G.Elyazyan (yellow card) 63'; Iwu 72' (yellow card) 85'	Report	Y.Shatalin 61'; A.Durunts 64'	Stadium: Vanadzor Football Academy; Attendance: 300; Referee: Ashot Ghaltakchyan

25 October 2018 Quarterfinal 1st leg	Pyunik	0 – 2	Lori	Yerevan
18:00 (UTC+4)	Kolychev (yellow card) 11'; R.Hakobyan (yellow card) 30'; Trusevych (yellow card) 45'; Stezhko (yellow card) 54'	Report	Iwu 12'; A.Azatyan (yellow card) 22'; Ingbede 83'	Stadium: Vazgen Sargsyan Republican Stadium; Attendance: 300; Referee: Zaven Hovhannisyan

8 November 2018 Quarterfinal 2nd leg	Lori	1 – 1 (3 – 1 agg.)	Pyunik	Vanadzor
14:00 (UTC+4)	S.Harutyunyan (yellow card) 87'; Konov (yellow card) 90+2'; Iwu 90+4'	Report	R.Minasyan (yellow card) 33'; A.Arakelyan 40'; A.Kartashyan (yellow card) 73'	Stadium: Vanadzor Football Academy; Attendance: 400; Referee: Suren Baliyan

3 April 2019 Semifinal 1st leg	Banants	0 – 0	Lori	Yerevan
14:00 (UTC+4)	Camara (yellow card) 65'	Report	Aliyu (yellow card) 45'	Stadium: Banants Stadium; Attendance: 150; Referee: Artak Simonyan

22 April 2019 Semifinal 2nd leg	Lori	3 – 0 W/O (3 – 0 agg.)	Banants	Vanadzor
16:00 (UTC+4)		Report		Stadium: Vanadzor Football Academy; Referee: Gevorg Eghoyan
Note: Banants owner, Jevan Cheloian, removed his team from the pitch prior to kick-off in protest of the appointment of Gevorg Eghoyan as referee.

==== Final ====
8 May 2019	Alashkert	1 – 0	Lori	Yerevan
19:30 (UTC+4)	Grigoryan (yellow card) 61'; Friday 65' (o.g.)	Report		Stadium: Banants Stadium; Attendance: 4,000; Referee: Alberto Undiano Mallenco

== Statistics ==
As of match played 30 May 2019

=== Appearances and goals ===
No.	Pos	Nat	Player	Total		Premier League		Armenian Cup	
No.	Pos	Nat	Player	Apps	Goals	Apps	Goals	Apps	Goals
2	DF	(Ghana) GHA	Nana Antwi	33	1	27	1	5+1	0
3	DF	(Uganda) UGA	Alex Kakuba	12	0	9+1	0	2	0
4	DF	(Armenia) ARM	Murad Asatryan	4	0	3	0	0+1	0
5	MF	(Nigeria) NGA	Julius Ufuoma	6	0	4+2	0	0	0
6	DF	(Ghana) GHA	Annan Mensah	28	0	23+1	0	4	0
7	MF	(Armenia) ARM	Vladimir Babayan	1	0	1	0	0	0
8	MF	(Armenia) ARM	Aram Kocharyan	11	0	8+1	0	2	0
9	FW	(Ghana) GHA	Darko Enock	15	0	7+6	0	0+2	0
10	MF	(Nigeria) NGA	Isah Aliyu	34	6	29	6	3+2	0
11	FW	(Moldova) MDA	Alexandru Osipov	8	0	1+7	0	0	0
14	MF	(Nigeria) NGA	Udoh Etop	16	1	6+9	1	1	0
15	DF	(Nigeria) NGA	Deou Dosa	34	0	22+8	0	3+1	0
16	DF	(Nigeria) NGA	Ekereuke Ekemini	7	0	2+3	0	2	0
17	MF	(Nigeria) NGA	Ugochukwu Iwu	35	5	29	2	5+1	3
18	DF	(Armenia) ARM	Artyom Khachaturov	29	1	26	1	3	0
19	FW	(Nigeria) NGA	Nwani Ikechukwu	6	2	1+4	2	0+1	0
20	MF	(Nigeria) NGA	Ubong Friday	9	0	6+1	0	1+1	0
22	DF	(Armenia) ARM	Hayk Ishkhanyan	16	0	14	0	2	0
26	FW	(Nigeria) NGA	Sunday Ingbede	26	8	16+5	7	3+2	1
27	FW	(Ivory Coast) CIV	Stephane Adjuman	21	1	11+7	1	1+2	0
33	GK	(Ukraine) UKR	Danylo Ryabenko	3	0	2+1	0	0	0
77	GK	(Russia) RUS	Arsen Siukayev	16	0	14	0	2	0
97	FW	(Haiti) HAI	Jonel Désiré	30	17	24+1	17	4+1	0
99	DF	(Armenia) ARM	Arman Mkrtchyan	16	0	10+4	0	2	0
Players away on loan:
21	FW	(Nigeria) NGA	Francis Nwankwo	9	3	1+6	1	2	2
Players who left Lori during the season:
1	GK	(Bulgaria) BUL	Aleksandar Konov	15	0	14	0	1	0
5	DF	(Ghana) GHA	Richard Botchway	3	0	0+1	0	1+1	0
7	MF	(Armenia) ARM	David Aslanyan	1	0	0	0	1	0
8	FW	(Armenia) ARM	Vigen Avetisyan	18	2	14+3	2	1	0
9	FW	(Armenia) ARM	Areg Azatyan	17	1	6+7	0	4	1
11	MF	(Russia) RUS	Kirill Volchkov	4	0	0+2	0	1+1	0
13	GK	(Armenia) ARM	Gor Elyazyan	5	0	2	0	3	0
19	MF	(Armenia) ARM	Stepan Harutyunyan	4	0	0+1	0	2+1	0
20	MF	(Armenia) ARM	Aram Adamyan	10	1	2+6	0	2	1
22	DF	(Armenia) ARM	Vardan Movsisyan	8	0	4+2	0	2	0
30	MF	(Ghana) GHA	Ibrahim Fuseini	18	0	14+3	0	1	0

=== Goal scorers ===
Place	Position	Nation	Number	Name	Premier League	Armenian Cup	Total
1	FW	(Haiti)	97	Jonel Désiré	17	0	17
2	FW	(Nigeria)	26	Sunday Ingbede	7	1	8
3	MF	(Nigeria)	10	Isah Aliyu	7	0	7
4	MF	(Nigeria)	17	Ugochukwu Iwu	2	3	5
5	FW	(Nigeria)	21	Francis Nwankwo	1	2	3
6	FW	(Armenia)	8	Vigen Avetisyan	2	0	2
6	FW	(Nigeria)	19	Nwani Ikechukwu	2	0	2
8	MF	(Nigeria)	14	Udoh Etop	1	0	1
8	FW	(Ivory Coast)	27	Stephane Adjuman	1	0	1
8	DF	(Armenia)	18	Artyom Khachaturov	1	0	1
8	DF	(Ghana)	2	Nana Antwi	1	0	1
8	FW	(Armenia)	9	Areg Azatyan	0	1	1
8	MF	(Armenia)		Aram Adamyan	0	1	1
				TOTALS	42	8	50

=== Clean sheets ===
Place	Position	Nation	Number	Name	Premier League	Armenian Cup	Total
1	GK	(Russia)	77	Arsen Siukayev	5	1	6
2	GK	(Bulgaria)	1	Aleksandar Konov	4	0	4
3	GK	(Armenia)	13	Gor Elyazyan	0	1	1
				TOTALS	9	2	11

=== Disciplinary record ===
Number	Nation	Position	Name	Premier League		Armenian Cup		Total	
Number	Nation	Position	Name	Booked	Sent off (straight red)	Booked	Sent off (straight red)	Booked	Sent off (straight red)
2	(Ghana)	DF	Nana Antwi	5	1	0	0	5	1
4	(Armenia)	DF	Murad Asatryan	1	0	0	0	1	0
6	(Ghana)	DF	Annan Mensah	1	0	0	0	1	0
9	(Ghana)	FW	Darko Enock	1	0	0	0	1	0
10	(Nigeria)	MF	Isah Aliyu	5	0	1	0	6	0
14	(Nigeria)	MF	Udoh Etop	2	0	0	0	2	0
15	(Nigeria)	DF	Deou Dosa	3	0	0	0	3	0
16	(Nigeria)	DF	Ekereuke Ekemini	0	0	1	0	1	0
17	(Nigeria)	MF	Ugochukwu Iwu	5	0	1	0	6	0
18	(Armenia)	DF	Artyom Khachaturov	2	0	0	0	2	0
26	(Nigeria)	FW	Sunday Ingbede	3	0	0	0	3	0
27	(Ivory Coast)	FW	Stephane Adjuman	2	0	0	0	2	0
77	(Russia)	GK	Arsen Siukayev	2	0	0	0	2	0
97	(Haiti)	FW	Jonel Désiré	3	0	0	0	3	0
99	(Armenia)	DF	Arman Mkrtchyan	1	0	0	0	1	0
Players who left Lori during the season:
1	(Bulgaria)	GK	Aleksandar Konov	0	0	1	0	1	0
9	(Armenia)	FW	Areg Azatyan	1	0	1	0	2	0
11	(Russia)	MF	Kirill Volchkov	0	0	1	0	1	0
13	(Armenia)	GK	Gor Elyazyan	1	0	2	0	3	0
19	(Armenia)	DF	Stepan Harutyunyan	1	0	1	0	2	0
30	(Ghana)	MF	Ibrahim Fuseini	6	0	0	0	6	0
			TOTALS	45	1	9	0	54	1
