= 2021–22 FC Urartu season =

Urartu
2021–22 season
- CEO: Artur Sahakyan
- Manager: Arsen Petrosyan (until 17 November); Robert Arzumanyan (Acting Head Coach) (from 17 November)
- Stadium: Alashkert Stadium
- Premier League: 5th
- Armenian Cup: Runners Up
- Europa Conference League: First Qualifying Round vs Maribor
- Top goalscorer: League: Artur Miranyan (10); All: Artur Miranyan (11)
Home colours	Away colours

The 2021–22 season was FC Urartu's twenty-first consecutive season in the Armenian Premier League. Urartu will participate in the Armenian Premier League, Armenian Cup and the UEFA Europa Conference League.

== Season events ==
On 17 June, Urartu announced the signing of Nana Antwi from Lori.

On 21 June, Urartu announced that Narek Agasaryan, Sergey Mkrtchyan and Narek Grigoryan had all returned to the club following loan spells at BKMA Yerevan the previous season.

Urartu announced their second signing of the summer on 28 June, with Livio Milts joining the club from Roda JC Kerkrade.

On 30 July, Urartu announced the signing of Vardan Arzoyan from Shirak.

On 18 August, Urartu announced the signing of Armen Manucharyan after he'd left Aktobe in June.

On 17 November, Urartu announced that Arsen Petrosyan had returned to his role with the club's youth teams, and that Robert Arzumanyan had been appointed as Acting Head Coach.

On 14 December, Urartu announced that Livio Milts had left the club by mutual consent.

On 17 February, Urartu announced the signing of Erik Vardanyan from Sochi.

On 17 February, Urartu announced the signing of Dmytro Khlyobas from Ordabasy.

== Squad ==
As of match played 28 May 2022

Number	Name	Nationality	Position	Date of birth (age)	Signed from	Signed in	Contract ends	Apps.	Goals
Goalkeepers
24	Arsen Beglaryan	(Armenia)	GK	6 January 1996 (aged 26)	Dnyapro Mogilev	2020		51	0
96	Anatoly Ayvazov	(Armenia)	GK	8 June 1996 (aged 25)	Shirak	2018		35	0
Defenders
2	Nana Antwi	(Ghana)	DF	10 August 2000 (aged 21)	Lori	2021		31	0
4	Armen Manucharyan	(Armenia)	DF	3 February 1995 (aged 27)	Unattached	2021		42	0
6	Arman Ghazaryan	(Armenia)	DF	24 July 2001 (aged 20)	Academy	2019		14	0
14	Pyotr Ten	(Russia)	DF	12 July 1992 (aged 29)	Minsk	2021		39	0
15	Annan Mensah	(Ghana)	DF	6 June 1996 (aged 25)	Lori	2020		28	0
18	Salomon Nirisarike	(Rwanda)	DF	23 March 1993 (aged 29)	Pyunik	2021		27	0
25	Edgar Grigoryan	(Armenia)	DF	25 August 1998 (aged 23)	Academy	2019		42	0
36	Khariton Ayvazyan	(Armenia)	DF	8 November 2003 (aged 18)	Academy	2020		21	0
67	Vadym Paramonov	(Ukraine)	DF	18 March 1991 (aged 31)	Rukh Lviv	2021		35	1
88	Zhirayr Margaryan	(Armenia)	DF	13 September 1997 (aged 24)	on loan from Veres Rivne	2022		21	0
95	Vardan Arzoyan	(Armenia)	DF	30 April 1995 (aged 27)	Shirak	2021		0	0
Midfielders
5	Hakob Hakobyan	(Armenia)	MF	29 March 1997 (aged 25)	Academy	2013		182	3
8	Ugochukwu Iwu	(Nigeria)	MF	28 November 1999 (aged 22)	Lori	2020		58	6
9	Narek Agasaryan	(Armenia)	MF	15 July 2001 (aged 20)	Academy	2021		36	1
17	Tigran Ayunts	(Armenia)	MF	15 March 2000 (aged 22)	Academy	2017		5	0
19	Sergey Mkrtchyan	(Armenia)	MF	26 June 2001 (aged 20)	Academy	2021		31	2
20	Gor Lulukyan	(Armenia)	MF	2 January 2003 (aged 19)	Academy	2020		19	2
23	Erik Vardanyan	(Armenia)	MF	7 June 1998 (aged 23)	Sochi	2022		7	0
28	Robert Baghramyan	(Armenia)	MF	29 June 2002 (aged 19)	BKMA Yerevan	2020		4	0
90	Oleg Polyakov	(Russia)	MF	29 November 1990 (aged 31)	Armavir	2020		57	7
Forwards
10	Karen Melkonyan	(Armenia)	FW	25 March 1999 (aged 23)	Academy	2017		118	9
12	Jonel Désiré	(Haiti)	FW	12 February 1997 (aged 25)	Lori	2020		49	13
13	Dmytro Khlyobas	(Ukraine)	FW	9 May 1994 (aged 28)	Ordabasy	2022		13	3
21	Narek Grigoryan	(Armenia)	FW	17 June 2001 (aged 20)	Academy	2019		26	3
22	Artur Miranyan	(Armenia)	FW	27 December 1995 (aged 26)	Pyunik	2021		36	13
55	Samvel Hakobyan	(Armenia)	FW	30 April 2003 (aged 19)	Academy	2020		4	1
Players away on loan
77	Erik Simonyan	(Armenia)	DF	12 June 2003 (aged 18)	Academy	2019		5	0
Players who left during the season
6	Peter Mutumosi	(Democratic Republic of the Congo)	MF	25 May 1998 (aged 24)	Motema Pembe	2019		30	1
23	Livio Milts	(Belgium)	MF	4 October 1997 (aged 24)	Roda JC Kerkrade	2021		11	0
33	Vitinho	(Brazil)	MF	8 September 1997 (aged 24)	Ararat Yerevan	2020		31	1

== Transfers ==
=== In ===
Date	Position	Nationality	Name	From	Fee	Ref.
17 June 2021	DF	(Ghana)	Nana Antwi	Lori	Undisclosed	
28 June 2021	MF	(Belgium)	Livio Milts	Roda JC Kerkrade	Undisclosed	
30 July 2021	DF	(Armenia)	Vardan Arzoyan	Shirak	Undisclosed	
18 August 2021	DF	(Armenia)	Armen Manucharyan	Unattached	Free	
17 February 2022	MF	(Armenia)	Erik Vardanyan	Sochi	Undisclosed	
18 February 2022	FW	(Ukraine)	Dmytro Khlyobas	Ordabasy	Undisclosed	

=== Loans in ===
Date from	Position	Nationality	Name	From	Date to	Ref.
15 March 2022	DF	(Armenia)	Zhirayr Margaryan	Veres Rivne	End of season	

=== Out ===
Date	Position	Nationality	Name	To	Fee	Ref.
3 August 2021	MF	(Armenia)	Gevorg Tarakhchyan	Sevan	Undisclosed	
24 February 2022	MF	(Brazil)	Vitinho	Alashkert	Undisclosed	

=== Loans out ===
Date from	Position	Nationality	Name	To	Date to	Ref.
1 August 2019	DF	(Armenia)	Arman Ghazaryan	BKMA Yerevan	18 January 2022	
29 July 2021	DF	(Armenia)	Erik Piloyan	BKMA Yerevan	End of season	
2 February 2022	DF	(Armenia)	Erik Simonyan	BKMA Yerevan	End of season	

=== Released ===
Date	Position	Nationality	Name	Joined	Date	Ref.
7 June 2021	FW	(Russia)	Yevgeni Kobzar	Noravank	8 February 2022	
10 June 2021	MF	(Nigeria)	Isah Aliyu	Ararat Yerevan	22 July 2021	
11 June 2021	DF	(Armenia)	Narek Petrosyan			
16 June 2021	DF	(Brazil)	James	Alashkert	2 July 2021	
14 December 2021	MF	(Belgium)	Livio Milts	PAEEK	2 January 2022	
28 January 2022	MF	(Democratic Republic of the Congo)	Peter Mutumosi	AS Vita Club	2 February 2022	
2 June 2022	DF	(Armenia)	Armen Manucharyan	Van	15 February 2023	
2 June 2022	DF	(Ghana)	Annan Mensah	Alashkert		
2 June 2022	DF	(Rwanda)	Salomon Nirisarike			

== Friendlies ==
8 August 2021	Urartu	0–1	Noravank	Yerevan
17:00 (UTC+4)		Report	E.Petrosyan 16'	Stadium: Alashkert Stadium

20 January 2022	BKMA Yerevan	1–1	Urartu	Yerevan
13:00 (UTC+4)	M.Mirzoyan	Report	Agasaryan	Stadium: FFA Academy Stadium

26 January 2022	Urartu	3–0	Ararat Yerevan	Yerevan
14:00 (UTC+4)	Polyakov 14'; Melkonyan 78', 88'	Report		Stadium: Urartu-3 Stadium

8 February 2022	Urartu (Armenia)	1–1	(Russia) Sochi II	Sochi, Russia
14:00 (UTC+4)	Désiré 65'	Report	Trialist 90'	Stadium: Loo Arena Hotel Complex

12 February 2022	Urartu (Armenia)	2–1	(Belarus) Dinamo Minsk	Sochi, Russia
13:00 (UTC+4)	Désiré 48' (pen.); K.Melkonyan 75'	Report	Latykhov 90+3'	Stadium: Loo Arena Hotel Complex

13 February 2022	Noah	2–0	Urartu II	Yerevan
(UTC+4)	Harutyunyan 72'; A.Adamyan 82'	Report

== Competitions ==
=== Overall record ===
Competition	First match	Last match	Starting round	Final position	Record							
Competition	First match	Last match	Starting round	Final position	Pld	W	D	L	GF	GA	GD	Win %
Premier League	1 August 2021	28 May 2022	Matchday 1	5th	32	9	13	10	37	32	+5	28.13
Armenian Cup	21 November 2021	8 May 2022	Quarterfinal	Runners Up	3	2	0	1	5	2	+3	66.67
UEFA Europa Conference League	8 July 2021	15 July 2021	First qualifying round	First qualifying round	2	0	0	2	0	2	−2	0.00
Total					37	11	13	13	42	36	+6	29.73

Last updated: 28 May 2022
Source: Competitions

=== Premier League ===
==== Results summary ====
Overall								Home						Away					
Pld	W	D	L	GF	GA	GD	Pts	W	D	L	GF	GA	GD	W	D	L	GF	GA	GD
32	9	13	10	37	32	+5	40	5	6	5	18	12	+6	4	7	5	19	20	−1

Last updated: 28 May 2022.
Source: See Results

==== Results by round ====
Round	1	2	3	4	5	6	7	8	9	10	11	12	13	14	15	16	17	18	19	20	21	22	23	24	25	26	27	28	29	30	31	32	33	34	35
Ground	H	H	A	A	H	A	H	A	A	A	H	A	H	A	H (Note: Between matchday 15 and 16, Sevan were expelled from the league.)	A	H	H	H	A	H	A	H	A	H	A	A	H	A	H	A	H	H	A	H
Result	W	V	L	W	L	L	L	D	W	V	D	L	W	L	D	D	W	D	P	D	D	W	L	D	D	W	L	L	D	W	D	D	L	D	W
Position	4	2	3	4	5	5	6	6	6	6	6	6	6	6	6	6	6	6	6	6	6	5	5	6	6	5	6	6	6	6	6	6	6	6	5

Updated to match(es) played on 28 May 2022. Source: See Results
A = Away; H = Home; W = Win; D = Draw; L = Loss; P = Postponed; V = Void

==== Results ====
1 August 2021 1	Urartu	3–0	Noravank	Yerevan
20:00 (UTC+4)	N.Grigoryan 48'; Iwu 67'; Melkonyan 86'	Report	Bashilov (yellow card) 82'; D.Quaye (yellow card) 90+1'	Stadium: Urartu Stadium; Attendance: 700; Referee: Artur Safaryan

7 August 2021 2	Urartu	v	Sevan	Yerevan
20:00 (UTC+4)	A.Mensah (yellow card) 23'; N.Grigoryan 45'; Polyakov 62', 81'; Miranyan (yellow card) 74'; Iwu 79'	Report	Nirisarike 25' (o.g.); Rudoselsky (yellow card) 27'; B.Cham (yellow card) 36'; L.Matheus (yellow card) 45'	Stadium: Urartu Stadium; Attendance: 880; Referee: Artem Gasparyan
Note: Match declared void on 1 December 2021.

15 August 2021 3	Ararat Yerevan	2–0	Urartu	Yerevan
20:00 (UTC+4)	Manoyan (yellow card) 47'; D.Pobulić (yellow card) 52'; Y.Silue 72'; R.Mkrtchyan (yellow card) 76'; Stanojević 88'	Report	Hakobyan (yellow card) 56'	Stadium: Republican Stadium; Attendance: 700; Referee: Ashot Ghaltakchyan

23 August 2021 5	BKMA Yerevan	1–2	Urartu	Yerevan
19:00 (UTC+4)	G.Petrosyan 45'; E.Piloyan (yellow card) 51'	Report	N.Grigoryan (yellow card) 56' (goal) 74'; Milts (yellow card) 78'; Melkonyan 80'; Hakobyan (yellow card) 80'	Stadium: FFA Academy Stadium; Attendance: 700; Referee: Artur Tavakalyan

13 September 2021 6	Urartu	0–2	Pyunik	Yerevan
20:00 (UTC+4)	Désiré (yellow card) 4'; N.Grigoryan (yellow card) 32'; E.Grigoryan (yellow card) 36'; Iwu (yellow card) 67'	Report	Vardanyan 42'; Firmino 52'	Stadium: Urartu Stadium; Attendance: 400; Referee: Vardan Manukyan

22 September 2021 7	Ararat-Armenia	3–0	Urartu	Yerevan
18:00 (UTC+4)	Lima 47' (pen.), 52'; Shaghoyan 81' (yellow card) 88'	Report		Stadium: FFA Academy Stadium; Attendance: 300; Referee: Zaven Hovhannisyan

29 September 2021 8	Urartu	0–1	Noah	Yerevan
19:30 (UTC+4)	Iwu (yellow card) 68'	Report	G.Matevosyan (yellow card) 52'; Emsis (yellow card) 82'; Paireli 90'	Stadium: Urartu Stadium; Attendance: 1,000; Referee: Vardan Manukyan

16 October 2021 9	Van	1–1	Urartu	Charentsavan
15:00 (UTC+4)	V.Filippov 12'; V.Ayvazyan (yellow card) 15'; S.Adjouman (yellow card) 71'; A.Hovhannisyan (red card) 78'	Report	Polyakov 62'; Mkrtchyan (yellow card) 90+4'	Stadium: Charentsavan City Stadium; Referee: Henrik Nalbandyan

21 October 2021 10	Noravank	0–1	Urartu	Charentsavan
15:00 (UTC+4)	Ingbede (yellow card) 36'; Zonjić (yellow card) 90'; Mustafin (red card) 90'	Report	N.Grigoryan 20'; K.Ayvazyan (yellow card) 36'; Iwu (yellow card) 40'	Stadium: Charentsavan City Stadium; Attendance: 60; Referee: Vardan Manukyan

26 October 2021 11	Sevan	v	Urartu	Yerevan
15:00 (UTC+4)	Rudoselsky (yellow card) 32'; B.Cham (yellow card) 67'; Kartashyan (yellow card) 90'	Report	Hakobyan (yellow card) 33'; Iwu (yellow card) 60'; Milts (red card) 85'; Ten (yellow card) 87'	Stadium: Alashkert Stadium; Attendance: 400; Referee: Henrik Nalbandyan
Note: Match declared void on 1 December 2021.

30 October 2021 12	Urartu	1–1	Ararat Yerevan	Yerevan
19:30 (UTC+4)	Mkrtchyan 90+1'	Report	E.Malakyan 46'	Stadium: Urartu Stadium; Attendance: 800; Referee: Ashot Ghaltakchyan

8 November 2021 13	Alashkert	2–1	Urartu	Yerevan
14:00 (UTC+4)	Milinković 29'; D.Dosa 45' (yellow card) 51'; Glišić (yellow card) 90'	Report	Ten (yellow card) 44'; Polyakov 54'	Stadium: Alashkert Stadium; Attendance: 300; Referee: Zaven Hovhannisyan

17 November 2021 14	Urartu	5–0	BKMA Yerevan	Yerevan
18:30 (UTC+4)	Iwu 1'; Ten (yellow card) 18'; Désiré 52', 58', 69'; G.Lulukyan 90'	Report		Stadium: Urartu Stadium; Referee: Shahen Aghayan

28 November 2021 15	Pyunik	2–0	Urartu	Yerevan
18:00 (UTC+4)	Baranov 15' (yellow card) 82'; Gajić (yellow card) 50'; Caraballo (yellow card) 59'; Ghazaryan 68'	Report	Ten (yellow card) 34'; N.Grigoryan (yellow card) 51'; Désiré (yellow card) 84'; Paramonov (yellow card) 90+1'	Stadium: Republican Stadium; Attendance: 200; Referee: Artem Gasparyan

3 December 2021 16	Urartu	0–0	Ararat-Armenia	Yerevan
18:30 (UTC+4)		Report	Sanogo (yellow card) 65'	Stadium: Urartu Stadium; Attendance: 700; Referee: Zaven Hovhannisyan

10 December 2021 17	Noah	1–1	Urartu	Yerevan
17:00 (UTC+4)	C.Ikechukwu (yellow card) 63'; S.Gomes (yellow card) 81'; Matviyenko 85'	Report	Désiré (yellow card) 23'; Polyakov 73'	Stadium: FFA Academy Stadium; Referee: Shahen Aghayan

20 February 2022 18	Urartu	1–0	Van	Yerevan
16:00 (UTC+4)	Miranyan 77'	Report	A.Petrosyan (yellow card) 76'; J.Gaba (yellow card) 90'	Stadium: Urartu-3 Stadium; Referee: Vardan Manukyan

24 February 2022 19	Urartu	1–1	Noravank	Yerevan
16:00 (UTC+4)	Antwi (yellow card) 7' (yellow-red card) 87'; Désiré 17' (pen.)	Report	A.Avagyan (yellow card) 32' (yellow-red card) 90+1'; A.Khachatryan (yellow card) 47'; Ebert 74'; Rudoselsky (yellow card) 77'	Stadium: Urartu Stadium; Referee: Ashot Ghaltakchyan

1 March 2022 20	Urartu	BYE	Sevan	Yerevan
(UTC+4)				Stadium: Urartu Stadium
Note: Sevan expelled from the league on 1 December 2021.

5 March 2022 21	Ararat Yerevan	0–0	Urartu	Yerevan
17:00 (UTC+4)	G.Malakyan (yellow card) 53'; H.Nazaryan (yellow card) 89'	Report	K.Ayvazyan (yellow card) 63'; E.Grigoryan (yellow card) 64'	Stadium: Republican Stadium; Referee: Henrik Nalbandyan

9 March 2022 22	Urartu	0–0	Alashkert	Yerevan
18:00 (UTC+4)		Report	Gome (yellow card) 79'	Stadium: Alashkert Stadium; Referee: Zaven Hovhannisyan

16 March 2022 23	BKMA Yerevan	1–4	Urartu	Yerevan
17:00 (UTC+4)	D.Aghbalyan (yellow card) 55'; Mkrtchyan (yellow card) 58'	Report	Khlyobas 21', 50'; Miranyan 49'; Mkrtchyan 86'	Stadium: FFA Academy Stadium; Referee: Vardan Manukyan

20 March 2022 24	Urartu	0–1	Pyunik	Yerevan
16:30 (UTC+4)		Report	Hovhannisyan (yellow card) 63'; Najaryan (yellow card) 80'; Juninho 90+4'	Stadium: Urartu Stadium; Referee: Zaven Hovhannisyan

8 April 2022 25	Ararat-Armenia	1–1	Urartu	Yerevan
18:00 (UTC+4)	Mailson 30' (pen.) (yellow card) 77'; Wbeymar (yellow card) 33'; Muradyan (yellow card) 38'; Bueno (yellow card) 77'	Report	Désiré (yellow card) 6'; Miranyan 34'; Beglaryan (yellow card) 80'	Stadium: Republican Stadium; Referee: Henrik Nalbandyan

12 April 2022 26	Urartu	2–2	Noah	Yerevan
17:00 (UTC+4)	A.Ghazaryan (yellow card) 30'; Miranyan 38' (pen.), 52'; Iwu (yellow card) 60'; E.Grigoryan (yellow card) 84'	Report	Mayrovich 32' (pen.); Harutyunyan (yellow card) 37'; A.Oliveira 38'; S.Shahinyan (yellow card) 50'	Stadium: Urartu Stadium; Referee: Zaven Hovhannisyan

16 April 2022 27	Van	0–3	Urartu	Charentsavan
15:00 (UTC+4)	Gvazava (yellow card) 44'; B.Hovhannisyan (yellow card) 71' (yellow-red card) 87'; J.Gaba (yellow card) 75'; V.Filippov (yellow card) 80'	Report	Agasaryan (yellow card) 39' (goal) 81'; Miranyan 49', 52'; A.Ghazaryan (yellow card) 78'	Stadium: Charentsavan City Stadium; Referee: Sargis Khachatryan

20 April 2022 28	Noravank	3–2	Urartu	Yerevan
15:00 (UTC+4)	Kobzar 51'; B.Cham 58', 84'	Report	Iwu 25'; Margaryan (yellow card) 41'; Miranyan 62'	Stadium: FFA Academy Stadium; Referee: Henrik Nalbandyan

22 April 2022 29	Sevan	v	Urartu	Yerevan
(UTC+4)				Stadium: Alashkert Stadium
Note: Sevan expelled from the league on 1 December 2021.

28 April 2022 30	Urartu	1–2	Ararat Yerevan	Yerevan
19:30 (UTC+4)	E.Grigoryan (red card) 8'; Mkrtchyan (yellow card) 52'; Miranyan 72'	Report	E.Malakyan 41'; H.Nazaryan (yellow card) 45+5' (yellow-red card) 62'; C.Ouguehi (yellow card) 45+7'; Manoyan 77' (yellow card) 90+2'; Stanojević (yellow card) 90+5'	Stadium: Urartu Stadium; Referee: Zaven Hovhannisyan

3 May 2022 31	Alashkert	1–1	Urartu	Yerevan
16:00 (UTC+4)	Embaló 77'; Milinković (yellow card) 90+2'	Report	Antwi (yellow card) 35'; K.Melkonyan 44'; Margaryan (yellow card) 84'	Stadium: Alashkert Stadium; Referee: Vardan Manukyan

11 May 2022 32	Urartu	1–0	BKMA Yerevan	Yerevan
19:30 (UTC+4)	Agasaryan (yellow card) 7'; K.Melkonyan 80'; Beglaryan (yellow card) 88'; Désiré (yellow card) 90+2'	Report	D.Aghbalyan (yellow card) 52'; A.Khamoyan (yellow card) 57'; Mkrtchyan (yellow card) 69'; V.Samsonyan (yellow card) 76'	Stadium: Urartu Stadium; Referee: Henrik Nalbandyan

15 May 2022 33	Pyunik	1–1	Urartu	Yerevan
19:00 (UTC+4)	Baranov 35'	Report	Iwu 20'; Vardanyan (yellow card) 37'; E.Grigoryan (yellow card) 87'	Stadium: Republican Stadium; Referee: Artem Gasparyan

18 May 2022 4	Urartu	0–0	Alashkert	Yerevan
19:00 (UTC+4)	Ten (yellow card) 85'	Report	Grigoryan (yellow card) 79'	Stadium: Alashkert Stadium; Referee: Artem Gasparyan
Note: Match originally scheduled for 20 August 2021, but postponed due to Alashkert's participation in the UEFA Europa League Playoff round.

22 May 2022 34	Urartu	1–2	Ararat-Armenia	Yerevan
16:45 (UTC+4)	S.Hakobyan 73'; A.Ghazaryan (yellow card) 89'	Report	Ambartsumyan 14' (yellow card) 66'; Lima 16'; Wbeymar (yellow card) 36'	Stadium: Urartu Stadium; Referee: Shahen Aghayan

25 May 2022 35	Noah	1–1	Urartu	Armavir
16:00 (UTC+4)	Mayrovich 3' (pen.) (yellow card) 88'; Gabarayev (yellow card) 43'	Report	Beglaryan (yellow card) 2'; Khlyobas 65'	Stadium: Armavir City Stadium; Referee: Zaven Hovhannisyan

28 May 2022 36	Urartu	2–0	Van	Yerevan
17:00 (UTC+4)	Miranyan 6' (pen.) (yellow card) 80'; T.Ayunts (yellow card) 13'; G.Lulukyan 90+1'	Report	J.Gaba (yellow card) 18'; Stepanov (yellow card) 52'	Stadium: Urartu Stadium; Referee: Ashot Ghaltakchyan

==== Table ====
Pos	Team	Pld	W	D	L	GF	GA	GD	Pts	Qualification or relegation
1	Pyunik (C)	32	23	6	3	52	25	+27	75	Qualification for the Champions League first qualifying round
2	Ararat-Armenia	32	23	5	4	56	20	+36	74	Qualification for the Europa Conference League second qualifying round (Note: The 2021–22 Armenian Cup winners, Noravank, did not obtain an UEFA license and was replaced.)
3	Alashkert	32	14	9	9	38	30	+8	51	Qualification for the Europa Conference League first qualifying round
4	Ararat Yerevan	32	13	7	12	47	36	+11	46	Qualification for the Europa Conference League first qualifying round
5	Urartu	32	9	13	10	37	32	+5	40	
6	Noah	32	9	12	11	38	43	−5	39	
7	Noravank	32	7	7	18	36	55	−19	28	
8	Van	32	6	7	19	19	47	−28	25	
9	BKMA (O)	32	4	6	22	25	60	−35	18	Qualification to the relegation play-offs
10	Sevan (D, R)	0	0	0	0	0	0	0	0	Relegation to the Armenian First League (Note: Sevan was expelled from the league on 1 December 2021.)

Source: FFA Soccerway
Rules for classification: 1) Points; 2) Head-to-head points; 3) Head-to-head goal difference; 4) Head-to-head goals scored; 5) Matches won; 6) Goal difference; 7) Less red cards; 8) Less yellow cards; 9) Fair-play ranking 10) Draw
(C) Champions; (D) Disqualified; (O) Play-off winners; (R) Relegated

=== Armenian Cup ===
21 November 2021 Quarterfinal	Urartu	2–0	Alashkert	Yerevan
18:30 (UTC+4)	Désiré 30'; Paramonov (yellow card) 42'; Polyakov (yellow card) 49'; Grigoryan (yellow card) 53'; Hakobyan (yellow card) 73' (goal) 78'; Vitinho (yellow card) 80'; Beglaryan (yellow card) 80'	Report	Gome (yellow card) 20'; Voskanyan (yellow card) 45'; Cametá (yellow card) 74'	Stadium: Urartu Stadium; Attendance: 700; Referee: Henrik Nalbandyan

3 April 2022 Semifinal	Urartu	3–0	Van	Yerevan
18:00 (UTC+4)	H.Hakobyan (yellow card) 42'; Miranyan 52'; A.Ghazaryan (yellow card) 58'; Iwu 64'; Désiré 69' (pen.)	Report	E.Mireku (yellow card) 3'; Stepanov (yellow card) 3'; A.Petrosyan (yellow card) 68'; B.Techie (yellow card) 76'	Stadium: Urartu Stadium; Referee: Shahen Aghayan

==== Final ====
8 May 2022	Noravank	2–0	Urartu	Yerevan
19:00 (UTC+4)	Mustafin 28' (yellow card) 88'; A.Avagyan (yellow card) 45+2'; Yenne 77'	Report		Stadium: Republican Stadium; Referee: Zaven Hovhannisyan

=== UEFA Europa Conference League ===
==== Qualifying rounds ====
8 July 2021 First qualifying round 1st leg	Maribor (Slovenia)	1–0	(Armenia) Urartu	Maribor, Slovenia
22:45 (UTC+4)	Žugelj 56'; Vancaš (yellow card) 59'; Milec (yellow card) 90+5'	Report	Antwi (yellow card) 36'; Iwu (yellow card) 83'; Milts (yellow card) 89'	Stadium: Ljudski vrt Attendance: 3,250; Referee: Nathan Verboomen (Belgium)

15 July 2021 First qualifying round 2nd leg	Urartu (Armenia)	0–1 (0–2 agg.)	(Slovenia) Maribor	Yerevan, Armenia
20:00 (UTC+4)	Antwi (yellow card) 61'	Report	Vrhovec (yellow card) 45+1'; Šturm 85'; Voloder (yellow card) 87'	Stadium: Urartu Stadium; Attendance: 2,114; Referee: Christopher Jaeger (Austria)

== Statistics ==
As of match played 28 May 2022

=== Appearances and goals ===
No.	Pos	Nat	Player	Total		Premier League		Armenian Cup		UEFA Europa Conference League	
No.	Pos	Nat	Player	Apps	Goals	Apps	Goals	Apps	Goals	Apps	Goals
2	DF	(Ghana) GHA	Nana Antwi	32	0	21+6	0	3	0	2	0
4	DF	(Armenia) ARM	Armen Manucharyan	20	0	17+1	0	2	0	0	0
5	MF	(Armenia) ARM	Hakob Hakobyan	31	1	23+4	0	2	1	2	0
6	DF	(Armenia) ARM	Arman Ghazaryan	15	0	12+1	0	2	0	0	0
8	MF	(Nigeria) NGR	Ugochukwu Iwu	34	5	27+2	4	3	1	2	0
9	MF	(Armenia) ARM	Narek Agasaryan	37	1	29+3	1	3	0	2	0
10	FW	(Armenia) ARM	Karen Melkonyan	30	4	10+17	4	0+1	0	1+1	0
12	FW	(Haiti) HAI	Jonel Désiré	29	5	17+9	3	3	2	0	0
13	FW	(Ukraine) UKR	Dmytro Khlyobas	14	3	2+11	3	0+1	0	0	0
14	DF	(Russia) RUS	Pyotr Ten	24	0	17+2	0	2+1	0	2	0
15	DF	(Ghana) GHA	Annan Mensah	15	0	12+1	0	0	0	2	0
17	MF	(Armenia) ARM	Tigran Ayunts	3	0	2+1	0	0	0	0	0
18	DF	(Rwanda) RWA	Salomon Nirisarike	13	0	11	0	0	0	2	0
19	MF	(Armenia) ARM	Sergey Mkrtchyan	32	2	17+11	2	2+1	0	0+1	0
20	MF	(Armenia) ARM	Gor Lulukyan	13	2	6+7	2	0	0	0	0
21	FW	(Armenia) ARM	Narek Grigoryan	19	3	9+7	3	1	0	1+1	0
22	FW	(Armenia) ARM	Artur Miranyan	26	11	16+5	10	2+1	1	2	0
23	MF	(Armenia) ARM	Erik Vardanyan	7	0	3+3	0	0+1	0	0	0
24	GK	(Armenia) ARM	Arsen Beglaryan	28	0	25	0	3	0	0	0
25	DF	(Armenia) ARM	Edgar Grigoryan	26	0	10+13	0	0+1	0	1+1	0
28	MF	(Armenia) ARM	Robert Baghramyan	1	0	0+1	0	0	0	0	0
36	DF	(Armenia) ARM	Khariton Ayvazyan	14	0	8+4	0	0+2	0	0	0
55	FW	(Armenia) ARM	Samvel Hakobyan	3	1	0+3	1	0	0	0	0
67	DF	(Ukraine) UKR	Vadym Paramonov	22	0	19	0	3	0	0	0
88	DF	(Armenia) ARM	Zhirayr Margaryan	12	0	5+5	0	1+1	0	0	0
90	MF	(Russia) RUS	Oleg Polyakov	35	3	19+11	3	1+2	0	1+1	0
96	GK	(Armenia) ARM	Anatoly Ayvazov	9	0	7	0	0	0	2	0
Players away on loan:
Players who left Urartu during the season:
6	MF	(Democratic Republic of the Congo) COD	Peter Mutumosi	2	0	0+2	0	0	0	0	0
23	MF	(Belgium) BEL	Livio Milts	11	0	7+2	0	0	0	0+2	0
33	MF	(Brazil) BRA	Vitinho	5	0	1+3	0	0+1	0	0	0

=== Goal scorers ===
Place	Position	Nation	Number	Name	Premier League	Armenian Cup	UEFA Europa Conference League	Total
1	FW	(Armenia)	22	Artur Miranyan	10	1	0	11
2	FW	(Haiti)	12	Jonel Désiré	4	2	0	6
3	MF	(Nigeria)	8	Ugochukwu Iwu	4	1	0	5
4	MF	(Armenia)	10	Karen Melkonyan	4	0	0	4
5	FW	(Armenia)	21	Narek Grigoryan	3	0	0	3
5	MF	(Russia)	90	Oleg Polyakov	3	0	0	3
5	FW	(Ukraine)	13	Dmytro Khlyobas	3	0	0	3
8	MF	(Armenia)	19	Sergey Mkrtchyan	2	0	0	2
8	MF	(Armenia)	20	Gor Lulukyan	2	0	0	2
10	MF	(Armenia)	9	Narek Agasaryan	1	0	0	1
10	FW	(Armenia)	55	Samvel Hakobyan	1	0	0	1
10	MF	(Armenia)	5	Hakob Hakobyan	0	1	0	1
				TOTALS	37	5	0	42

=== Clean sheets ===
Place	Position	Nation	Number	Name	Premier League	Armenian Cup	UEFA Europa Conference League	Total
1	GK	(Armenia)	24	Arsen Beglaryan	10	2	0	12
2	GK	(Armenia)	96	Anatoly Ayvazov	1	0	0	1
				TOTALS	11	2	0	13

=== Disciplinary record ===
Number	Nation	Position	Name	Premier League		Armenian Cup		UEFA Europa Conference League		Total	
Number	Nation	Position	Name	Yellow card	Red card	Yellow card	Red card	Yellow card	Red card	Yellow card	Red card
2	(Ghana)	DF	Nana Antwi	3	1	0	0	2	0	5	1
5	(Armenia)	MF	Hakob Hakobyan	2	0	2	0	0	0	4	0
6	(Armenia)	DF	Arman Ghazaryan	3	0	1	0	0	0	4	0
8	(Nigeria)	MF	Ugochukwu Iwu	4	0	0	0	1	0	5	0
9	(Armenia)	MF	Narek Agasaryan	2	0	0	0	0	0	2	0
12	(Haiti)	FW	Jonel Désiré	4	0	0	0	0	0	4	0
14	(France)	DF	Pyotr Ten	4	0	0	0	0	0	4	0
17	(Armenia)	MF	Tigran Ayunts	1	0	0	0	0	0	1	0
19	(Armenia)	MF	Sergey Mkrtchyan	2	0	0	0	0	0	2	0
21	(Armenia)	FW	Narek Grigoryan	3	0	1	0	0	0	4	0
22	(Armenia)	FW	Artur Miranyan	1	0	0	0	0	0	1	0
23	(Armenia)	MF	Erik Vardanyan	1	0	0	0	0	0	1	0
24	(Armenia)	GK	Arsen Beglaryan	3	0	1	0	0	0	4	0
25	(Armenia)	DF	Edgar Grigoryan	4	1	0	0	0	0	4	1
33	(Brazil)	MF	Vitinho	0	0	1	0	0	0	1	0
36	(Armenia)	MF	Khariton Ayvazyan	2	0	0	0	0	0	2	0
67	(Ukraine)	DF	Vadym Paramonov	1	0	1	0	0	0	2	0
88	(Armenia)	DF	Zhirayr Margaryan	2	0	0	0	0	0	2	0
90	(Russia)	MF	Oleg Polyakov	0	0	1	0	0	0	1	0
Players away on loan:
Players who left Urartu during the season:
23	(Belgium)	MF	Livio Milts	1	0	0	0	1	0	2	0
			TOTALS	43	2	8	0	4	0	55	2
