= 2018–19 in Armenian football =

Football in Armenia
- Season: 2018–19

Men's football
- Premier League: Ararat-Armenia
- First League: Junior Sevan
- Cup: Alashkert
- Supercup: Alashkert

The following article is a summary of the 2018–19 football season in Armenia, which is the 27th season of competitive football in the country and runs from August 2018 to May 2019.

== League tables ==
=== Armenian Premier League ===
Pos	Team	Pld	W	D	L	GF	GA	GD	Pts	Qualification or relegation
1	Ararat-Armenia (C)	32	18	7	7	53	28	+25	61	Qualification for the Champions League first qualifying round
2	Pyunik	32	18	6	8	46	32	+14	60	Qualification for the Europa League first qualifying round (Note: Alashkert qualified for the Europa League first qualifying round by winning the 2018–19 Armenian Cup.)
3	Banants	32	14	10	8	43	35	+8	52	Qualification for the Europa League first qualifying round
4	Alashkert	32	15	6	11	37	27	+10	51	Qualification for the Europa League first qualifying round
5	Lori	32	11	11	10	42	40	+2	44	
6	Gandzasar	32	10	8	14	38	33	+5	38	
7	Shirak	32	7	15	10	26	30	−4	36	
8	Artsakh	32	6	10	16	25	49	−24	28	
9	Ararat Yerevan	32	5	7	20	24	60	−36	22	

Source: Soccerway
Rules for classification: 1) Points; 2) Play-off (only if deciding champion); 3) Matches won; 4) Head-to-head points; 5) Head-to-head matches won; 6) Head-to-head goal difference; 7) Head-to-head goals scored; 8) Head-to-head away goals scored; 9) Goal difference; 10) Goals scored.
(C) Champions

=== Armenian First League ===
Pos	Team	Pld	W	D	L	GF	GA	GD	Pts	Promotion
1	Junior Sevan (C)	33	25	6	2	90	26	+64	81	
2	Yerevan (P)	33	22	4	7	112	46	+66	70	Promotion to the Premier League
3	Banants-2	33	21	7	5	65	31	+34	70	
4	Ararat-Armenia-2	33	18	7	8	70	40	+30	61	
5	Alashkert-2	33	15	10	8	63	39	+24	55	
6	Lokomotiv Yerevan	33	16	7	10	61	37	+24	55	
7	Pyunik-2	33	11	7	15	47	56	−9	40	
8	Shirak-2	33	11	4	18	38	56	−18	37	
9	Banants-3	33	9	6	18	38	57	−19	33	
10	Gandzasar Kapan-2	33	7	6	20	43	94	−51	27	
11	Ararat Yerevan-2	33	6	7	20	40	94	−54	25	
12	Erebuni	33	1	1	31	12	103	−91	4	

Updated to match(es) played on unknown. Source: Football Federation of Armenia (in English)
Rules for classification: 1) Points; 2) Play-off (only if deciding champion); 3) Matches won; 4) Head-to-head points; 5) Head-to-head matches won; 6) Head-to-head goal difference; 7) Head-to-head goals scored; 8) Head-to-head away goals scored; 9) Goal difference; 10) Goals scored.
(C) Champions; (P) Promoted

== Armenian Cup ==
=== Final ===
8 May 2019
19:30

Alashkert	1–0	Lori
Friday 65' (o.g.)	Report

Banants Stadium, Yerevan
Attendance: 4,000
Referee: Alberto Undiano Mallenco (Spain)

== National team ==
=== 2018–19 UEFA Nations League ===
Pos	Team	Pld	W	D	L	GF	GA	GD	Pts	Promotion (Note: Due to revamp of the format for the 2020–21 UEFA Nations League, the second-placed teams in each group and the best third-placed team among all groups were also promoted.)	(North Macedonia)	(Armenia)	(Gibraltar)	(Liechtenstein)
1	Macedonia (P)	6	5	0	1	14	5	+9	15	Promotion to League C	—	2–0	4–0	4–1
2	Armenia (P)	6	3	1	2	14	8	+6	10	Promotion to League C	4–0	—	0–1	2–1
3	Gibraltar	6	2	0	4	5	15	−10	6		0–2	2–6	—	2–1
4	Liechtenstein	6	1	1	4	7	12	−5	4		0–2	2–2	2–0	—

Source: UEFA
Rules for classification: Tiebreakers
(P) Promoted
Notes:

6 September 2018 2018–19 UEFA Nations League	Armenia	2 – 1	Liechtenstein	Yerevan, Armenia
20:00 UTC+4	Pizzelli 30'; Barseghyan 76'	Report	S. Wolfinger 33'	Stadium: Vazgen Sargsyan Republican Stadium; Attendance: 5,132; Referee: Enea Jorgji (Albania)

9 September 2018 2018–19 UEFA Nations League	Macedonia	2 – 0	Armenia	Skopje, Macedonia
18:00 UTC+2	Alioski 14' (pen.); Pandev 59'	Report		Stadium: Philip II Arena; Attendance: 4,730; Referee: Manuel Schüttengruber (Austria)

13 October 2018 2018–19 UEFA Nations League	Armenia	0 – 1	Gibraltar	Yerevan, Armenia
20:00 UTC+4		Report	J. Chipolina 50' (pen.)	Stadium: Vazgen Sargsyan Republican Stadium; Attendance: 11,000; Referee: Fedayi San (Switzerland)

16 October 2018 2018–19 UEFA Nations League	Armenia	4 – 0	Macedonia	Yerevan, Armenia
20:00 UTC+4	Pizzelli 12'; Movsisyan 67'; Ghazaryan 81'; Mkhitaryan 90+4'	Report		Stadium: Vazgen Sargsyan Republican Stadium; Attendance: 8,300; Referee: Martin Strömbergsson (Sweden)

16 November 2018 2018–19 UEFA Nations League	Gibraltar	2 – 6	Armenia	Gibraltar
20:45 UTC+1	De Barr 10'; Priestley 78'	Report	Movsisyan 27', 48', 52', 54'; Kartashyan 66'; Karapetian 90+4'	Stadium: Victoria Stadium; Attendance: 1,955; Referee: Kai Erik Steen (Norway)

19 November 2018 2018–19 UEFA Nations League	Liechtenstein	2 – 2	Armenia	Vaduz, Liechtenstein
20:45 UTC+2	Büchel 44'; Hasler 47'	Report	Adamyan 9'; Karapetian 85'	Stadium: Rheinpark Stadion; Attendance: 1,166; Referee: Alain Durieux (Luxembourg)

=== UEFA Euro 2020 qualification ===
Pos	Team	Pld	W	D	L	GF	GA	GD	Pts	Qualification	(Italy)	(Finland)	(Greece)	(Bosnia and Herzegovina)	(Armenia)	(Liechtenstein)
1	Italy	10	10	0	0	37	4	+33	30	Qualify for final tournament	—	2–0	2–0	2–1	9–1	6–0
2	Finland	10	6	0	4	16	10	+6	18	Qualify for final tournament	1–2	—	1–0	2–0	3–0	3–0
3	Greece	10	4	2	4	12	14	−2	14		0–3	2–1	—	2–1	2–3	1–1
4	Bosnia and Herzegovina	10	4	1	5	20	17	+3	13	Advance to play-offs via Nations League	0–3	4–1	2–2	—	2–1	5–0
5	Armenia	10	3	1	6	14	25	−11	10		1–3	0–2	0–1	4–2	—	3–0
6	Liechtenstein	10	0	2	8	2	31	−29	2		0–5	0–2	0–2	0–3	1–1	—

Source: UEFA
Rules for classification: Qualification tiebreakers

23 March 2019 UEFA Euro 2020 qualifying	Bosnia and Herzegovina	2 – 1	Armenia	Sarajevo, Bosnia and Herzegovina
20:45 UTC+1	Krunić 33'; Milošević 80'	Report	Mkhitaryan 90+3' (pen.)	Stadium: Stadion Grbavica; Attendance: 10,000; Referee: Jakob Kehlet (Denmark)

26 March 2019 UEFA Euro 2020 qualifying	Armenia	0 – 2	Finland	Yerevan, Armenia
21:00 UTC+4		Report	Jensen 14'; Soiri 78'	Stadium: Vazgen Sargsyan Republican Stadium; Attendance: 12,900; Referee: Nikola Dabanović (Montenegro)

8 June 2019 UEFA Euro 2020 qualifying	Armenia	3 – 0	Liechtenstein	Yerevan, Armenia
20:00 UTC+4	Ghazaryan 2'; Karapetian 18'; Barseghyan 90+1'	Report		Stadium: Vazgen Sargsyan Republican Stadium; Attendance: 9,200; Referee: Nikola Popov (Bulgaria)

11 June 2019 UEFA Euro 2020 qualifying	Greece	2 – 3	Armenia	Athens, Greece
21:45 UTC+3	Zeca 54'; Fortounis 87'	Report	Karapetian 8'; Ghazaryan 33'; Barseghyan 74'	Stadium: Olympic Stadium; Attendance: 7,011; Referee: Kristo Tohver (Estonia)
