= 2018–19 Armenian Cup =

Tournament details
- Country: Armenia
- Teams: 12

Final positions
- Champions: Alashkert
- Runners-up: Lori
- UEFA Europa League: Alashkert

Tournament statistics
- Matches played: 21
- Goals scored: 53 (2.52 per match)
- Top goal scorer: Anton Kobyalko 6 Goals

The 2018–19 Armenian Cup was the 28th edition of the football knockout competition in Armenia. This season's cup winners earned a place in the 2019–20 Europa League. The tournament began on 19 September 2018 and ended on 7 May 2019.

Gandzasar Kapan were the defending champions after defeating Alashkert on penalties in the previous season's final.

== Format ==
The Armenian Football Cup this season was contested between twelve clubs over four rounds. The final was a single match which determined the cup winner, all other rounds were played over two legs.

== First round ==
19 September 2018 1st leg	Lokomotiv	1–1	Ararat Yerevan	Yerevan
15:00	Malyaka 20' (o.g.); A.Kocharyan (yellow card) 84'	Report	Azin (yellow card) 13'; Malyaka 59' (pen.) (yellow card) 90'; D.Zakharyan (yellow card) 77'	Stadium: Mika Stadium; Attendance: 200; Referee: Ashot Ghaltakchyan

3 October 2018 2nd leg	Ararat Yerevan	3–1 (4–2 agg.)	Lokomotiv	Yerevan
14:00	Avagyan 17'; Kirakosyan 28'; Badoyan 29'	Report	G.Mkrtumyan (yellow card) 27'; Manukyan 64'; D.Margaryan (yellow card) 90+1'	Stadium: Alashkert Stadium; Attendance: 200; Referee: Artur Simonyan

20 September 2018 1st leg	Junior Sevan	2–3	Lori	Dzoraghbyur
16:00	V.Uldyakov (yellow card) 22'; Cheminava (yellow card) 42'; A.Durunts 59' (pen.); Sysuyev 70'	Report	Volchkov (yellow card) 21'; A.Azatyan 26' (pen.); N.Francis 41', 88'; G.Elyazyan (yellow card) 59'	Stadium: Dzoraghbyur Training Centre; Attendance: 60; Referee: Henrik Nalbandyan

4 October 2018 2nd leg	Lori	2–2 (5–4 agg.)	Junior Sevan	Vanadzor
14:00	E.Ekemini (yellow card) 27'; Adamyan 35'; G.Elyazyan (yellow card) 63'; Iwu 72' (yellow card) 85'	Report	Shatalin 61'; Durunts 64'	Stadium: Vanadzor Football Academy; Attendance: 300; Referee: Ashot Ghaltakchyan

20 September 2018 1st leg	Yerevan	1–4	Ararat-Armenia	Yerevan
16:00	E.Evgenev (yellow card) 54' (yellow-red card) 78'; R.Zavialov 88'	Report	Kobyalko 22', 31', 65'; V.Bakalyan (yellow card) 68'; Kayron 85'	Stadium: Yerevan Football Academy Stadium; Attendance: 200; Referee: Gevorg Eghoyan

3 October 2018 2nd leg	Ararat-Armenia	5–0 (9–1 agg.)	Yerevan	Yerevan
18:00	Guz (yellow card) 44'; Limonov 45' (o.g.); Kobyalko 49', 77'; Kayron 57'; Shagoyan 89'	Report	Y.Yevgenyev (yellow card) 80'	Stadium: Vazgen Sargsyan Republican Stadium; Attendance: 70; Referee: Henrik Nalbandyan

20 September 2018 1st leg	Artsakh	0–0	Shirak	Yerevan
16:00	Gareginyan (yellow card) 30'; O.Tupchiyenko (yellow card) 58'; A.Petrosyan (yellow card) 87'	Report		Stadium: Mika Stadium; Attendance: 100; Referee: Artur Safaryan

4 October 2018 2nd leg	Shirak	1–3 (1–3 agg.)	Artsakh	Gyumri
14:00	Ndong 13'	Report	O.Tupchiyenko (yellow card) 58'; Yeghiazaryan 48'; Aghekyan 68'; H.Nazaryan (yellow card) 71'; Baloyan 77'	Stadium: Gyumri City Stadium; Attendance: 150; Referee: Artur Safaryan

== Quarter–finals ==
24 October 2018 1st leg	Banants	3–1	Ararat Yerevan	Yerevan
15:00 (UTC+4)	Abdullahi 16', 90+4'; Loretsyan (yellow card) 25' (goal) 28'; Kpodo (yellow card) 22' (yellow-red card) 60'; Solovyov (yellow card) 88'	Report	V.Chopuryan (yellow card) 54'; G.Kirakosyan (yellow card) 74'; Dieye 79'	Stadium: Banants Stadium; Attendance: 150; Referee: Henrik Nalbandyan

8 November 2018 2nd leg	Ararat Yerevan	0–1 (1–4 agg.)	Banants	Yerevan
14:00 (UTC+4)	G.Poghosyan (yellow card) 3'; V.Chopuryan (red card)	Report	E.Petrosyan 50'	Stadium: Alashkert Stadium; Attendance: 150; Referee: Artur Simonyan

25 October 2018 1st leg	Pyunik	0–2	Lori	Yerevan
18:00 (UTC+4)	Kolychev (yellow card) 11'; R.Hakobyan (yellow card) 30'; Trusevych (yellow card) 45'; Stezhko (yellow card) 54'	Report	Iwu 12'; A.Azatyan (yellow card) 22'; Ingbede 83'	Stadium: Vazgen Sargsyan Republican Stadium; Attendance: 300; Referee: Zaven Hovhannisyan

8 November 2018 2nd leg	Lori	1–1 (3–1 agg.)	Pyunik	Vanadzor
14:00 (UTC+4)	S.Harutyunyan (yellow card) 87'; Konov (yellow card) 90+2'; Iwu 90+4'	Report	R.Minasyan (yellow card) 33'; Arakelyan 40'; Kartashyan (yellow card) 73'	Stadium: Vanadzor Football Academy; Attendance: 400; Referee: Suren Baliyan

24 October 2018 1st leg	Ararat-Armenia	1–1	Gandzasar	Yerevan
18:00 (UTC+4)	Monsalvo 15'; Kobyalko (yellow card) 53'; Avanesyan (yellow card) 64'	Report	Musonda (yellow card) 23'; A.Hovhannisyan (yellow card) 58'; Nranyan 63'	Stadium: Vazgen Sargsyan Republican Stadium; Attendance: 100; Referee: Artur Simonyan

7 November 2018 2nd leg	Gandzasar	0–1 (1–2 agg.)	Ararat-Armenia	Yerevan
18:00 (UTC+4)	Wbeymar (yellow card) 30'; Aslanyan (yellow card) 57'	Report	Monsalvo 11'; Pashov (yellow card) 72'	Stadium: Yerevan Football Academy Stadium; Attendance: 200; Referee: Zaven Hovhannisyan

24 October 2018 1st leg	Artsakh	1–2	Alashkert	Yerevan
15:00 (UTC+4)	Bakhtiyarov 36' (pen.); G.Aghekyan (yellow card) 79'; Minasyan (yellow card) 80'; O.Tupchiyenko (yellow card) 87'	Report	Jefferson 27' (yellow card) 47'; Voskanyan (yellow card) 35'; Arta.Yedigaryan 81' (pen.)	Stadium: Mika Stadium; Attendance: 100; Referee: Ashot Ghaltakchyan

7 November 2018 2nd leg	Alashkert	1–0 (3–1 agg.)	Artsakh	Yerevan
14:00 (UTC+4)	Marmentini (yellow card) 25'; Romero (yellow card) 31'; Poghosyan (yellow card) 33'; Shahinyan 90+3'	Report	A.Petrosyan (yellow card) 31'; H.Poghosyan (yellow card) 35'; A.Meliksetyan (yellow card) 90+3'	Stadium: Alashkert Stadium; Attendance: 200; Referee: Henrik Nalbandyan

== Semi–finals ==
3 April 2019 1st leg	Ararat-Armenia	2–2	Alashkert	Yerevan
14:00 (UTC+4)	Kobyalko 14'; Ambartsumyan (yellow card) 72'; Christian (yellow card) 73'; Khozin 79'	Report	Mkoyan 63'; Kódjo 76' (o.g.)	Stadium: Yerevan Football Academy Stadium; Attendance: 400; Referee: Zaven Hovhannisyan

22 April 2019 2nd leg	Alashkert	0–0 (2–2 (a) agg.)	Ararat-Armenia	Yerevan
16:00		Report		Stadium: Alashkert Stadium; Attendance: 300; Referee: Artak Simonyan

3 April 2019 1st leg	Banants	0–0	Lori	Yerevan
14:00 (UTC+4)	Camara (yellow card) 65'	Report	I.Aliyu (yellow card) 45'	Stadium: Banants Stadium; Attendance: 150; Referee: Artak Simonyan

22 April 2019 2nd leg	Lori	3–0; W/O (3–0 agg.)	Banants	Vanadzor
16:00		Report		Stadium: Vanadzor Football Academy; Referee: Gevorg Yeghoyan
Note: Banants owner Dzhevan Cheloyants, removed his team from the pitch prior to kick-off in protest of the appointment of Gevorg Yeghoyan as referee.

== Final ==
8 May 2019
19:30

Alashkert	1–0	Lori
Friday 65' (o.g.)	Report

Banants Stadium, Yerevan
Attendance: 4,000
Referee: Alberto Undiano Mallenco (Spain)

== Scorers ==
As of match played 8 May 2019

6 goals:

- (Russia) Anton Kobyalko - Ararat-Armenia

3 goals:

- (Nigeria) Uguchukwu Iwu - Lori

2 goals:

- (Brazil) Kayron - Ararat-Armenia
- (Colombia) Charles Monsalvo - Ararat-Armenia
- (Nigeria) Adamu Abdullahi - Banants
- (Nigeria) Nwankwo Francis - Lori
- (Armenia) Armen Durunts - Junior Sevan

1 goals:

- (Brazil) Jefferson - Alashkert
- (Armenia) Hrayr Mkoyan - Alashkert
- (Armenia) Sargis Shahinyan - Alashkert
- (Armenia) Artak Yedigaryan - Alashkert
- Zhirayr Shagoyan - Ararat-Armenia
- (Russia) Vladimir Khozin - Ararat-Armenia
- (Armenia) Ruslan Avagyan - Ararat Yerevan
- (Armenia) Zaven Badoyan - Ararat Yerevan
- (Armenia) Garegin Kirakosyan - Ararat Yerevan
- (Russia) Dmitri Malyaka - Ararat Yerevan
- (Senegal) Pape Demba Dieye - Ararat Yerevan
- (Armenia) Grigor Aghekyan - Artsakh
- (Armenia) Sarkis Baloyan - Artsakh
- (Armenia) Emil Yeghiazaryan - Artsakh
- (Kazakhstan) Akmal Bakhtiyarov - Artsakh
- (Armenia) Aram Loretsyan - Banants
- (Armenia) Erik Petrosyan - Banants
- (Armenia) Gevorg Nranyan - Gandzasar Kapan
- (Russia) Yaroslav Shatalin - Junior Sevan
- (Russia) Yegor Sysuyev - Junior Sevan
- (Armenia) Karapet Manukyan - Lokomotiv Yerevan
- (Bulgaria) Aram Adamyan - Lori
- (Armenia) Areg Azatyan - Lori
- (Nigeria) Sunday Ingbede - Lori
- (Armenia) Alik Arakelyan - Pyunik
- (Gabon) Henri Junior Ndong - Shirak
- (Russia) Roman Zavialov - Yerevan

Own goals:

- (Russia) Dmitri Malyaka (19 September 2018 vs Lokomotiv Yerevan)
- (Russia) Fyodor Limonov (3 October 2018 vs Ararat-Armenia)
- (Ivory Coast) Kódjo (3 April 2019 vs Alashkert)
- (Nigeria) Ubong Friday (8 May 2019 vs Alashkert)

== See also ==
- 2018–19 Armenian Premier League
