= Nana Kwame Antwi =

Ghanaian footballer (born 2000)

Nana Antwi
Personal information
- Full name: Nana Kwame Antwi
- Date of birth: 10 August 2000 (age 26)
- Place of birth: Accra, Ghana
- Height: 1.80 m (5 ft 11 in)
- Position: Right back

Team information
- Current team: Beitar Jerusalem
- Number: 2

Youth career
- Dansoman Leeds United
- –2018: Young Wise

Senior career*
Years	Team	Apps	(Gls)
2018–2021	Lori	42	(1)
2019–2020	→ Lille B (loan)	10	(0)
2021–2024	Urartu	74	(1)
2024–2026	FCSB	13	(0)
2024–2026	→ Hermannstadt (loan)	44	(0)
2026–	Beitar Jerusalem	11	(0)
- * Club domestic league appearances and goals as of 23 June 2026

Nana Kwame Antwi (born 10 August 2000) is a Ghanaian professional footballer who plays as a right back for Israeli Premier League club Beitar Jerusalem.

== Club career ==
In August 2018, Antwi joined newly promoted Armenian Premier League side Lori FC on a three-year deal. Antwi next joined French Ligue 1 side Lille on loan with an option to buy, being assigned to their B team for the season.

In the summer of 2021, Antwi joined Armenian Premier League side Urartu where he spent three years, winning both the Armenian Premier League and Armenian Cup.

In January 2024, Antwi joined Romanian Liga I club FCSB, signing a four-year contract.

== Career statistics ==
As of 3 February 2026

Appearances and goals by club, season and competition
Club	Season	League			National cup (Note: Includes Armenian Cup, Cupa României)		Europe		Other		Total	
Club	Season	Division	Apps	Goals	Apps	Goals	Apps	Goals	Apps	Goals	Apps	Goals
Lori	2018–19	Armenian Premier League	27	1	6	0	—		—		33	1
Lori	2020–21	Armenian Premier League	15	0	2	0	—		—		17	0
Lori	Total		42	1	8	0	—		—		50	1
Lille B (loan)	2019–20	Championnat National 2	10	0	—		—		—		10	0
Urartu	2021–22	Armenian Premier League	29	0	3	0	2 (Note: Appearances in UEFA Europa Conference League)	0	—		34	0
Urartu	2022–23	Armenian Premier League	27	0	2	0	—		—		29	0
Urartu	2023–24	Armenian Premier League	18	1	—		4 (Note: Two appearances in UEFA Champions League, two appearances and one goal in UEFA Europa Conference League)	1	1 (Note: Appearance in Armenian Supercup)	0	23	2
Urartu	Total		74	1	5	0	6	1	1	0	86	2
FCSB	2023–24	Liga I	9	0	—		—		—		9	0
FCSB	2024–25	Liga I	4	0	—		1 (Note: Appearance in UEFA Champions League)	0	1 (Note: Appearance in Supercupa României)	0	6	0
FCSB	Total		13	0	0	0	1	0	1	0	15	0
Hermannstadt (loan)	2024–25	Liga I	25	0	6	1	—		—		31	1
Hermannstadt (loan)	2025–26	Liga I	19	0	1	0	—		—		20	0
Hermannstadt (loan)	Total		44	0	7	1	—		—		51	1
Beitar Jerusalem	2025–26	Israeli Premier League	0	0	—		—		—		0	0
Career total			183	2	20	1	7	1	2	0	212	4

== Honours ==
Lori

- Armenian Cup runner-up: 2018–19

Urartu

- Armenian Premier League: 2022–23
- Armenian Cup: 2022–23
- Armenian Supercup runner-up: 2023

FCSB

- Liga I: 2023–24, 2024–25
- Supercupa României: 2024

Hermannstadt

- Cupa României runner-up: 2024–25
