= Danylo Ryabenko =

Ukrainian footballer

Personal information
- Full name: Danylo Romanovych Ryabenko
- Date of birth: 9 October 1998 (age 28)
- Place of birth: Makiivka, Ukraine
- Height: 1.95 m (6 ft 5 in)
- Position: Goalkeeper

Youth career
- 2009–2013: Shakhtar Donetsk
- 2013–2016: Metalurh Donetsk

Senior career*
Years	Team	Apps	(Gls)
2017–2019	Stal Kamianske	0	(0)
2018–2019	Lori	3	(0)
2019–2020	CSKA Pamir Dushanbe	15	(0)
2020–2023	Mezőkövesd	3	(0)
2024	Kolkheti-1913	10	(0)
2025	FC Džiugas	2	(0)
- * Club domestic league appearances and goals as of 13 January 2026

Danylo Romanovych Ryabenko (Ukrainian: Данило Романович Рябенко; born 9 October 1998) is a Ukrainian professional footballer.

== Club career ==
On 25 february 2025 Ryabenko signed with lithuanian Džiugas Club.

On 12 September 2025 Ryabenko made his debut in A lyga against Dainava.

== Career statistics ==
As of match played 19 May 2024.

Appearances and goals by club, season and competition
Club	Season	League			Cup		Continental		Other		Total	
Club	Season	Division	Apps	Goals	Apps	Goals	Apps	Goals	Apps	Goals	Apps	Goals
Lori	2018–19	Armenian Premier League	3	0	0	0	—		0	0	3	0
Mezőkövesd	2019–20	Nemzeti Bajnokság I	1	0	1	0	—		0	0	2	0
Mezőkövesd	2020–21	Nemzeti Bajnokság I	2	0	3	0	—		0	0	5	0
Mezőkövesd	2021–22	Nemzeti Bajnokság I	0	0	0	0	—		0	0	0	0
Mezőkövesd	2022–23	Nemzeti Bajnokság I	0	0	0	0	—		0	0	0	0
Mezőkövesd	2023–24	Nemzeti Bajnokság I	0	0	0	0	—		0	0	0	0
Mezőkövesd	Total		3	0	4	0	0	0	0	0	7	0
Kolkheti-1913	2024	Erovnuli Liga	10	0	0	0	—		0	0	10	0
Career total			16	0	4	0	0	0	0	0	20	0
