= Isah Aliyu =

Nigerian footballer (born 1999)

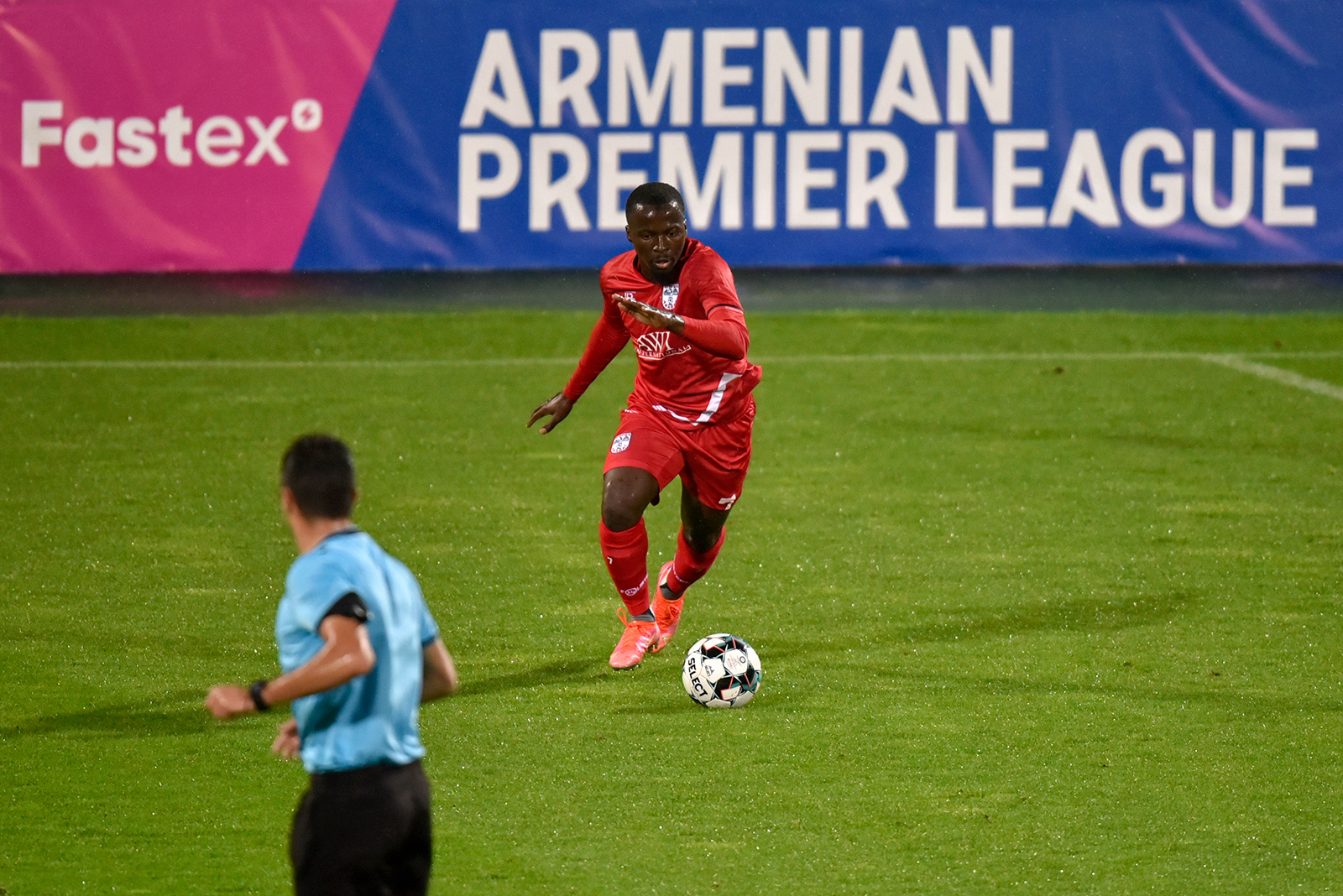

Personal information
- Full name: Isah Aliyu
- Date of birth: 8 August 1999 (age 27)
- Place of birth: Kaduna, Nigeria
- Position: Attacking midfielder

Team information
- Current team: Al Mostaqbal

Youth career
- Kakuri Academy

Senior career*
Years	Team	Apps	(Gls)
2016–2018	Remo Stars		
2018–2019	Lori	45	(10)
2019–2020	Almería B	7	(0)
2020	Al-Shoulla		
2020–2021	Urartu	13	(1)
2021–2023	Ararat Yerevan	50	(3)
2023	Remo Stars	3	(0)
2023–	Mosta	11	(0)
2024	Żabbar St. Patrick	7	(0)
2025–	Al Mostaqbal		
- * Club domestic league appearances and goals as of 2 December 2025

Isah Aliyu (born 8 August 1999) is a Nigerian footballer who plays as an attacking midfielder for Al Mostaqbal in the Egyptian Second Division B.

== Club career ==
Born in Kaduna, Aliyu joined Remo Stars in 2016, from Kakuri Academy. He was an important unit of the club who achieved promotion from the Nigeria National League in that year, and also appeared in the 2017 Nigeria Professional Football League, suffering relegation.

On 3 March 2018, Aliyu moved abroad and joined Armenian side Lori FC. He contributed with three goals in his first season, as his side achieved promotion to the Armenian Premier League as champions, and scored a further seven times in his second season, as his side finished fifth; in that season, the club also reached the final of the Armenian Cup.

On 1 September 2019, Aliyu joined Segunda División side Almeria on a five-year deal, for a fee of €140,000; Lori also retained a 20% of a future sale. He was initially assigned to the B-team in Tercera División.

On 21 January 2020, Al-Shoulla signed Aliyu for six months.

On 22 November 2020, FC Urartu announced the signing of Aliyu. After 16 appearances and one goal, Aliyu left Urartu on 10 June 2021.

On 22 July 2021, Aliyu signed for Ararat Yerevan. On 9 January 2023, Aliyu left Ararat Yerevan after his contract was terminated by mutual agreement.

On 24 March 2023, Remo Stars announced the return of Aliyu.

== Career statistics ==
=== Club ===
As of match played 4 December 2022

Appearances and goals by club, season and competition
Club	Season	League			National Cup		Continental		Other		Total	
Club	Season	Division	Apps	Goals	Apps	Goals	Apps	Goals	Apps	Goals	Apps	Goals
Lori	2017–18	Armenian First League	13	4	0	0	–				13	4
Lori	2018–19	Armenian Premier League	29	6	5	0	–				34	6
Lori	2019–20	Armenian Premier League	3	0	0	0	–				3	0
Lori	Total		45	10	5	0	-	-	-	-	50	10
Almería B	2019–20	Tercera División	7	0	–						7	0
Al-Shoulla	2019–20	MS League					–					
Urartu	2020–21	Armenian Premier League	13	1	3	0	–				16	1
Ararat Yerevan	2021–22	Armenian Premier League	32	3	2	0	1	0	1	0	34	3
Ararat Yerevan	2022–23	Armenian Premier League	18	0	1	0	2	0	-		21	0
Ararat Yerevan	Total		50	3	3	0	3	0	1	0	57	3
Career total			115	14	11	0	3	0	1	0	130	14

== Honours ==
Lori

- Armenian First League: 2017–18
