= Jonel Désiré =

Haitian footballer (born 1997)

Personal information
- Date of birth: 12 February 1997 (age 29)
- Place of birth: Mirebalais, Haiti
- Height: 1.80 m (5 ft 11 in)
- Position: Striker

Youth career
- Mirebalais

Senior career*
Years	Team	Apps	(Gls)
2015	Mirebalais		
2016–2017	Capoise		
2017	Real Monarchs	8	(0)
2018	Mirebalais		
2018–2019	→ Lori (loan)	25	(17)
2019–2020	Lori	23	(12)
2020–2022	Urartu	44	(12)
2022	Olympiakos Nicosia	9	(1)
2023	Pyunik	15	(4)
2023	Telavi	13	(4)
2024	Alashkert	14	(4)
2024	Telavi	17	(0)
2025	West Armenia	3	(0)
2025	Andranik	3	(0)
2026	Van	6	(0)

International career^{‡}
2012–2013	Haiti U17	5	(5)
2014–2017	Haiti U20	17	(11)
2015–	Haiti	21	(3)
- * Club domestic league appearances and goals as of 4 July 2026 ‡ National team caps and goals as of 23:46, 4 September 2021 (UTC)

Jonel Désiré (born 12 February 1997) is a Haitian professional footballer who plays as a striker, most recently for Armenian club Van, and the Haiti national team.

== Career ==
On 3 July 2018, Désiré signed a one-year contract, with the option of a second, with Armenian Premier League club Lori FC. On 18 July 2019, Lori FC announced that they had failed to negotiate a deal to keep Désiré in Armenia, and he returned to AS Mirebalais.

On 31 August 2019, Lori announced the permanent signing of Désiré on a three-year contract for $60,000.

On 8 August 2020, Désiré moved from Lori to fellow Armenian Premier League club FC Urartu.

On 6 July 2022, Urartu announced that they had terminated their contract with Désiré by mutual agreement, with Olympiakos Nicosia announcing the singing of Désiré later the same day. In December 2022, Désiré left Olympiakos Nicosia citing personal reasons. On 11 January 2023, Désiré returned to the Armenian Premier League, signing for Pyunik. On 16 June 2023, Pyunik confirmed the departure of Désiré.

On 16 January 2024, Armenian Premier League club Alashkert announced the signing of Désiré.

On 16 July 2024, Telavi announced the return of Désiré.

On 1 February 2025, West Armenia announced the signing of Désiré.

On 4 August 2025, Désiré signed for Armenian First League club Andranik.

On 5 February 2026, Désiré returned to the Armenian Premier League, signing for Van. On 4 July 2026, Van announced that Désiré had left the club after his contract had expired.

== Career statistics ==
=== Club ===
As of match played 16 March 2025

Appearances and goals by club, season and competition
Club	Season	League			National cup		Continental		Other		Total	
Club	Season	Division	Apps	Goals	Apps	Goals	Apps	Goals	Apps	Goals	Apps	Goals
Real Monarchs	2017	United Soccer League	8	0	0	0	–				8	0
Lori (loan)	2018–19	Armenian Premier League	25	17	5	0	–				30	17
Lori	2019–20	Armenian Premier League	23	12	1	0	–				24	12
Urartu	2020–21	Armenian Premier League	17	8	4	1	–				21	9
Urartu	2021–22	Armenian Premier League	27	4	3	2	0	0	–		30	6
Urartu	Total		44	12	7	3	0	0	–		51	15
Olympiakos Nicosia	2022–23	Cypriot First Division	9	1	1	0	–				10	1
Pyunik	2022–23	Armenian Premier League	15	4	1	0	0	0	–		16	4
Telavi	2023	Erovnuli Liga	13	4	0	0	–				13	4
Alashkert	2023–24	Armenian Premier League	14	4	0	0	0	0	–		14	4
Telavi	2024	Erovnuli Liga	17	0	2	0	–		2	0	21	0
West Armenia	2024–25	Armenian Premier League	3	0	1	0	–				4	0
Career total			171	54	18	3	0	0	2	0	191	57

=== International ===
As of match played 4 September 2021

Appearances and goals by national team and year
National team	Year	Apps	Goals
Haiti	2015	1	0
Haiti	2016	2	0
Haiti	2017	4	1
Haiti	2018	1	0
Haiti	2019	11	1
Haiti	2021	2	1
Total		21	3

Scores and results list Haiti's goal tally first, score column indicates score after each Désiré goal.

List of international goals scored by Jonel Désiré
No.	Date	Venue	Opponent	Score	Result	Competition
1	6 January 2017	Ato Boldon Stadium, Couva, Trinidad and Tobago	Suriname	3–0	4–2	2017 CONCACAF Gold Cup qualification
2	11 June 2019	Centro de Alto Rendimiento, Alajuela, Costa Rica	Guyana	3–0	3–1	Friendly
3	4 September 2021	Bahrain National Stadium, Riffa, Bahrain	Jordan	1–0	2–0	Friendly
