= Aleksandar Konov =

Bulgarian footballer

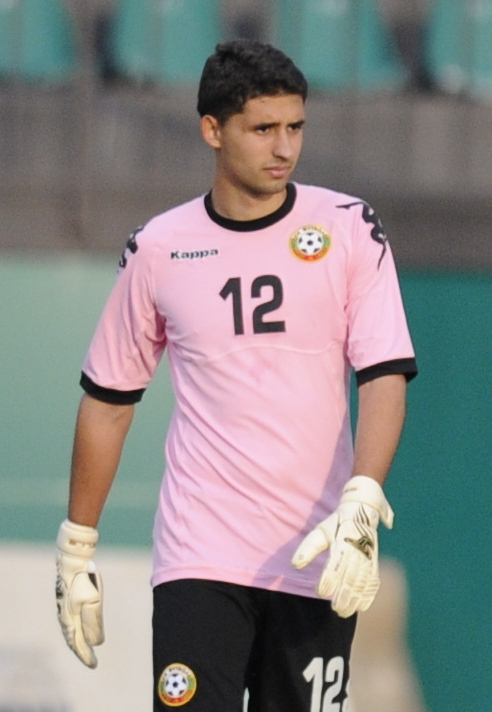
- Konov in 2012

Personal information
- Full name: Aleksandar Krasimirov Konov
- Date of birth: 3 September 1993 (age 33)
- Place of birth: Ruse, Bulgaria
- Height: 1.88 m (6 ft 2 in)
- Position: Goalkeeper

Youth career
- –2012: Litex Lovech

Senior career*
Years	Team	Apps	(Gls)
2012–2016	Litex Lovech	1	(0)
2013	→ Vidima-Rakovski (loan)	10	(0)
2013–2014	→ Dobrudzha Dobrich (loan)	19	(0)
2015–2016	Litex Lovech II	22	(0)
2016–2017	CSKA Sofia II	15	(0)
2016–2017	CSKA Sofia	3	(0)
2017	Dunav Ruse	2	(0)
2018	Oborishte	11	(0)
2018–2019	Lori	14	(0)

International career
2010	Bulgaria U17	1	(0)
2013–2015	Bulgaria U21	1	(0)
- * Club domestic league appearances and goals

Aleksandar Konov (Bulgarian: Александър Конов; born 3 September 1993) is a Bulgarian former professional footballer who played as a goalkeeper.

== Career ==
Konov joined Litex Lovech at academy level. He has been named on the Litex substitute bench for their fixture against Botev Plovdiv on 21 October 2012.

On 13 January 2013, Litex agreed for Konov to spend the rest of the season on loan to Vidima-Rakovski. He was first-choice goalkeeper during his loan-spell. In July 2013, Konov was loaned to Dobrudzha Dobrich for 2013–14 season.

Konov returned to Litex at the end of the season as second choice behind Vinícius Barrivieira. He was named on the bench for Litex's first seven games of the campaign and finally made his debut in the A Group on 14 September 2014, keeping a clean sheet against Haskovo at Lovech Stadium.

=== Dunav Ruse ===
On 12 June 2017 he left CSKA Sofia to join the other Bulgarian First League team of Dunav Ruse.

=== Lori ===
On 10 August 2018, Konov signed for newly promoted Armenian Premier League club Lori FC on a contract until the end of the year. On 11 December 2018, Konov extended his contract with Lori until the end of the 2018–19 season. On 9 March 2019, Konov announced his retirement from football due to an injury.

== Career statistics ==
As of 2 June 2015

Club	Season	Division	League		Cup		Europe		Total	
Club	Season	Division	Apps	Goals	Apps	Goals	Apps	Goals	Apps	Goals
Litex Lovech	2012–13	A Group	0	0	0	0	0	0	0	0
Vidima-Rakovski (loan)	2012–13	B Group	10	0	0	0	—		10	0
Dobrudzha Dobrich (loan)	2013–14	B Group	19	0	3	0	—		22	0
Litex Lovech	2014–15	A Group	1	0	2	0	0	0	3	0
Total	Bulgaria		30	0	5	0	0	0	35	0
