= Livio Milts =

Belgian footballer (born 1997)

Personal information
- Date of birth: 4 October 1997 (age 29)
- Place of birth: Genk, Belgium
- Height: 1.86 m (6 ft 1 in)
- Positions: Attacking midfielder; winger

Team information
- Current team: Sporting Hasselt
- Number: 11

Youth career
- Genk
- Geel
- –2015: Sint-Truiden
- 2015–2016: Club Brugge
- 2016–2017: Roda JC

Senior career*
Years	Team	Apps	(Gls)
2017–2021	Roda JC	56	(6)
2021	→ TOP Oss (loan)	15	(2)
2021	Urartu	9	(0)
2022	PAEEK	12	(0)
2022–2023	Patro Eisden	10	(0)
2023	→ Hoogstraten (loan)	14	(3)
2023–2024	Dessel Sport	33	(11)
2024–	Sporting Hasselt	49	(12)
- * Club domestic league appearances and goals as of 2 May 2026

Livio Milts (born 4 October 1997) is a Belgian professional footballer who plays as an attacking midfielder or a winger for Sporting Hasselt.

== Career ==
=== Early career ===
Milts started his career with Genk and later joined ASV Geel, where he played from U7 to U9. He then went to Sint-Truidense, where he played for 9 season. In 2015, he moved to Club Brugge. He then moved to the academy of Dutch club Roda JC Kerkrade.

=== Roda JC ===
He made his debut in the first team of Roda JC on 26 November 2017 in the 5–1 lost away match against Ajax, coming on as a substitute for Mario Engels in the 79th minute. He scored his first goal for the club on 3 December, scoring the winning 2–1 against SC Heerenveen in the 87th minute.

During the winter break of the 2020–21 season, Milts was sent on a six-month loan to TOP Oss. He made his debut on 5 February in a 6–0 win over Jong AZ, also scoring his first goal for the club.

=== Urartu ===
On 21 June 2021, it was announced that Milts had signed with Urartu competing in the Armenian Premier League. On 14 December 2021, Milts left Urartu by mutual consent.

=== PAEEK ===
In January 2022, he signed for Cypriot First Division club PAEEK.

=== Patro Eisden ===
On 21 June 2022, Milts returned to Belgium to sign for Patro Eisden.

Milts was sent on a six-month loan to Hoogstraten on 31 January 2023.

=== Dessel Sport ===
On 2 August 2023, Milts signed a contract with Dessel Sport, on a three-year contract.
