= 2018–19 Armenian Premier League =

Soccer event

Armenian Premier League
- Season: 2018–19
- Dates: 4 August 2018 – 30 May 2019
- Champions: Ararat-Armenia
- Champions League: Ararat-Armenia
- Europa League: Pyunik; Banants; Alashkert
- Matches: 144
- Goals: 334 (2.32 per match)
- Highest attendance: 5,181; Banants 3–0 Artsakh, (27 April 2019)
- All statistics correct as of 30 May 2019.

The 2018–19 Armenian Premier League season was the 27th since its establishment. The season began on 4 August 2018 and ended on 30 May 2019.

== Teams ==
The FFA decided to increase the 2018–19 Armenian Premier League participants from six to nine teams, thus three teams from 2017–18 Armenian First League were promoted. These are Ararat-Armenia, Artsakh FC and Lori.

Locations of the 2018–19 Armenian Premier League teams

| Club | Location | Stadium | Capacity |
|---|---|---|---|
| Alashkert | Yerevan (Shengavit) | Alashkert Stadium | 6,850 |
| Ararat | Yerevan (Shengavit) | Alashkert Stadium | 6,850 |
| Ararat-Armenia | Yerevan (Kentron) | Vazgen Sargsyan Republican Stadium | 14,403 |
| Artsakh | Yerevan (Shengavit) | Mika Stadium | 7,250 |
| Banants | Yerevan (Malatia-Sebastia) | Banants Stadium | 4,860 |
| Gandzasar | Yerevan (Avan) | Yerevan Football Academy Stadium^{1} | 1,428 |
| Lori | Vanadzor | Vanadzor Football Academy^{2} | 1,000 |
| Pyunik | Yerevan (Kentron) | Vazgen Sargsyan Republican Stadium | 14,403 |
| Shirak | Gyumri | Gyumri City Stadium | 2,844 |

- ^{1}Gandzasar Kapan played their home games at the Yerevan Football Academy Stadium in Yerevan, due to the rebuilding of their regular venue Gandzasar Stadium, Kapan.
- ^{2}Lori played at the main training pitch of the Vanadzor Football Academy due to the rebuilding of their regular venue Vanadzor City Stadium, Vanadzor.

=== Personnel and sponsorship ===
| Team | Manager | Captain | Kit manufacturer | Shirt sponsor |
|---|---|---|---|---|
| Alashkert | Varuzhan Sukiasyan (matchday 1 to 8); Aram Voskanyan (matchday 10 to 27); Abraham Khashmanyan (matchday 28 & onwards) | Artur Yedigaryan | Joma | Huawei, Bagratour |
| Ararat Yerevan | (Russia) Armen Stepanyan (matchday 1 to 9); Abraham Khashmanyan (matchday 10 to 26) | Rafael Safaryan | Adidas | |
| Ararat-Armenia | (Belarus) Vadim Skripchenko (matchday 1 to 8); Vardan Minasyan (matchday 10 & onwards) | Albert Khachumyan | Joma | Tashir Group |
| Artsakh | Rafael Nazaryan (matchday 1 to 19); Sevada Arzumanyan (matchday 19 & onwards) | Gor Mkrtumyan | Nike | Vega chain store |
| Banants | Artur Voskanyan (matchday 1 to 2) (Russia) Ilshat Faizulin (matchday 3 & onwards) | Stepan Ghazaryan | Adidas | |
| Gandzasar | Ashot Barseghyan | Ara Khachatryan | Adidas | ZCMC |
| Lori | Armen Adamyan (matchday 1 to 19); Artur Petrosyan (matchday 19 to 31); Vahe Gevorgyan (matchday 33 & onwards) | Gurgen Matevosyan | Puma | TotoGaming |
| Pyunik | (Russia) Andrei Talalayev (matchday 1 to 25) (Russia) Aleksandr Tarkhanov (matchday 28 & onwards) | Karlen Mkrtchyan | Umbro | Gold's Gym |
| Shirak | Vardan Bichakhchyan | Aghvan Davoyan | Adidas | |

== League table ==
| Pos | Team | Pld | W | D | L | GF | GA | GD | Pts | Qualification or relegation |
|---|---|---|---|---|---|---|---|---|---|---|
| 1 | Ararat-Armenia (C) | 32 | 18 | 7 | 7 | 53 | 28 | +25 | 61 | Qualification for the Champions League first qualifying round |
| 2 | Pyunik | 32 | 18 | 6 | 8 | 46 | 32 | +14 | 60 | Qualification for the Europa League first qualifying round (Note: Alashkert qualified for the Europa League first qualifying round by winning the 2018–19 Armenian Cup.) |
| 3 | Banants | 32 | 14 | 10 | 8 | 43 | 35 | +8 | 52 | Qualification for the Europa League first qualifying round |
| 4 | Alashkert | 32 | 15 | 6 | 11 | 37 | 27 | +10 | 51 | Qualification for the Europa League first qualifying round |
| 5 | Lori | 32 | 11 | 11 | 10 | 42 | 40 | +2 | 44 | |
| 6 | Gandzasar | 32 | 10 | 8 | 14 | 38 | 33 | +5 | 38 | |
| 7 | Shirak | 32 | 7 | 15 | 10 | 26 | 30 | −4 | 36 | |
| 8 | Artsakh | 32 | 6 | 10 | 16 | 25 | 49 | −24 | 28 | |
| 9 | Ararat Yerevan | 32 | 5 | 7 | 20 | 24 | 60 | −36 | 22 | |

Source: Soccerway
Rules for classification: 1) Points; 2) Play-off (only if deciding champion); 3) Matches won; 4) Head-to-head points; 5) Head-to-head matches won; 6) Head-to-head goal difference; 7) Head-to-head goals scored; 8) Head-to-head away goals scored; 9) Goal difference; 10) Goals scored.
(C) Champions

=== Positions by round ===
| Team ╲ Round | 1 | 2 | 3 | 4 | 5 | 6 | 7 | 8 | 9 | 10 | 11 | 12 | 13 | 14 | 15 | 16 | 17 | 18 | 19 | 20 | 21 | 22 | 23 | 24 | 25 | 26 | 27 | 28 | 29 | 30 | 31 | 32 |
|---|---|---|---|---|---|---|---|---|---|---|---|---|---|---|---|---|---|---|---|---|---|---|---|---|---|---|---|---|---|---|---|---|
| Ararat Armenia | 1 | 1 | 7 | 7 | 4 | 3 | 4 | 5 | 5 | 5 | 5 | 5 | 5 | 5 | 5 | 5 | 4 | 4 | 2 | 2 | 1 | 2 | 1 | 1 | 1 | 1 | 2 | 3 | 2 | 2 | 1 | 1 |
| Pyunik | 7 | 3 | 1 | 1 | 1 | 2 | 3 | 3 | 1 | 4 | 4 | 4 | 4 | 4 | 2 | 2 | 3 | 3 | 4 | 4 | 3 | 4 | 4 | 3 | 2 | 2 | 1 | 1 | 1 | 1 | 2 | 2 |
| Banants | 6 | 8 | 9 | 6 | 3 | 5 | 2 | 2 | 3 | 2 | 1 | 1 | 2 | 2 | 3 | 3 | 2 | 2 | 3 | 3 | 4 | 3 | 2 | 2 | 3 | 3 | 3 | 2 | 3 | 3 | 3 | 3 |
| Alashkert (Note: Alashkert qualified for the Europa League first qualifying round by winning the 2018–19 Armenian Cup.) | 2 | 4 | 2 | 3 | 5 | 4 | 5 | 4 | 4 | 3 | 2 | 2 | 1 | 1 | 1 | 1 | 1 | 1 | 1 | 1 | 2 | 1 | 3 | 4 | 4 | 4 | 4 | 4 | 4 | 4 | 4 | 4 |
| Lori | 9 | 9 | 6 | 2 | 2 | 1 | 1 | 1 | 2 | 1 | 3 | 3 | 3 | 3 | 4 | 4 | 5 | 5 | 5 | 5 | 5 | 5 | 5 | 5 | 5 | 5 | 5 | 5 | 5 | 5 | 5 | 5 |
| Gandzasar | 3 | 6 | 5 | 5 | 6 | 6 | 6 | 6 | 6 | 6 | 7 | 7 | 8 | 7 | 7 | 7 | 7 | 7 | 7 | 7 | 7 | 7 | 7 | 7 | 7 | 7 | 7 | 7 | 7 | 7 | 7 | 6 |
| Shirak | 5 | 7 | 8 | 9 | 9 | 7 | 9 | 7 | 7 | 7 | 6 | 6 | 6 | 6 | 6 | 6 | 6 | 6 | 6 | 6 | 6 | 6 | 6 | 6 | 6 | 6 | 6 | 6 | 6 | 6 | 6 | 7 |
| Artsakh | 4 | 2 | 3 | 8 | 8 | 9 | 7 | 8 | 8 | 8 | 8 | 8 | 7 | 8 | 8 | 8 | 9 | 9 | 8 | 9 | 8 | 8 | 8 | 8 | 8 | 8 | 8 | 8 | 8 | 8 | 8 | 8 |
| Ararat Yerevan | 8 | 5 | 4 | 4 | 7 | 8 | 8 | 9 | 9 | 9 | 9 | 9 | 9 | 9 | 9 | 9 | 8 | 8 | 9 | 8 | 9 | 9 | 9 | 9 | 9 | 9 | 9 | 9 | 9 | 9 | 9 | 9 |

| Leader and Champions League first qualifying round |
| Europa League first qualifying round |

== Results ==
=== First part of season ===
| Home \ Away | ALA | ARA | AAR | ART | BAN | GAN | LOR | PYU | SHI |
|---|---|---|---|---|---|---|---|---|---|
| Alashkert | — | 2–1 | 1–3 | 6–0 | 1–0 | 1–0 | 2–1 | 1–2 | 1–0 |
| Ararat Yerevan | 0–1 | — | 0–1 | 0–0 | 2–4 | 0–2 | 2–2 | 1–3 | 0–0 |
| Ararat-Armenia | 0–1 | 1–2 | — | 3–1 | 1–3 | 0–0 | 0–0 | 0–0 | 3–1 |
| Artsakh | 0–0 | 1–1 | 1–1 | — | 1–0 | 2–2 | 2–3 | 0–0 | 0–1 |
| Banants | 1–0 | 3–1 | 0–3 | 2–1 | — | 1–0 | 1–3 | 4–2 | 0–0 |
| Gandzasar Kapan | 0–1 | 4–0 | 0–0 | 0–2 | 3–0 | — | 2–0 | 1–2 | 1–1 |
| Lori | 1–1 | 1–0 | 0–2 | 3–2 | 1–3 | 3–0 | — | 0–1 | 3–1 |
| Pyunik | 0–1 | 0–1 | 3–1 | 2–0 | 2–0 | 0–1 | 0–3 | — | 1–1 |
| Shirak | 0–0 | 1–0 | 1–0 | 3–0 | 0–0 | 2–0 | 1–1 | 1–2 | — |

Legend: Blue = home team win; Yellow = draw; Red = away team win.

=== Second part of season ===
| Home \ Away | ALA | ARA | AAR | ART | BAN | GAN | LOR | PYU | SHI |
|---|---|---|---|---|---|---|---|---|---|
| Alashkert | — | 2–0 | 0–1 | 1–0 | 1–1 | 2–0 | 0–1 | 1–2 | 1–0 |
| Ararat Yerevan | 1–0 | — | 2–6 | 2–1 | 0–1 | 1–7 | 1–0 | 1–2 | 0–2 |
| Ararat-Armenia | 2–1 | 4–1 | — | 2–0 | 1–1 | 2–0 | 3–0 | 1–4 | 2–2 |
| Artsakh | 1–1 | 0–0 | 1–3 | — | 1–1 | 2–0 | 2–1 | 0–3 | 3–2 |
| Banants | 2–0 | 1–1 | 0–1 | 3–0 | — | 0–5 | 0–0 | 1–1 | 4–0 |
| Gandzasar Kapan | 2–4 | 1–0 | 2–1 | 0–1 | 1–2 | — | 1–1 | 0–1 | 0–0 |
| Lori | 3–2 | 2–2 | 0–1 | 2–0 | 1–3 | 0–0 | — | 2–2 | 2–2 |
| Pyunik | 1–0 | 2–1 | 0–3 | 1–0 | 1–1 | 1–3 | 1–2 | — | 2–0 |
| Shirak | 1–1 | 3–0 | 0–1 | 0–0 | 0–0 | 0–0 | 0–0 | 0–2 | — |

Legend: Blue = home team win; Yellow = draw; Red = away team win.

== Season statistics ==
=== Top scorers ===
As of match played 30 May 2019

| Rank | Player | Club | Goals |
|---|---|---|---|
| 1 | (Haiti) Jonel Désiré | Lori | 17 |
| 2 | (Russia) Anton Kobyalko | Ararat-Armenia | 15 |
| 3 | (Bulgaria) Ivaylo Dimitrov | Ararat-Armenia | 10 |
| 4 | (Armenia) Petros Avetisyan | Ararat-Armenia | 8 |
| 4 | (Armenia) Erik Vardanyan | Pyunik | 8 |
| 4 | (Armenia) Gegham Harutyunyan | Gandzasar Kapan | 8 |
| 7 | (Armenia) Mihran Manasyan | Gandzasar Kapan | 7 |
| 7 | (Nigeria) Isah Aliyu | Lori | 7 |
| 9 | (Nigeria) Sunday Ingbede | Lori | 6 |
| 9 | (Serbia) Uroš Nenadović | Alashkert | 6 |
| 9 | (Ivory Coast) Mohamed Konaté | Pyunik | 6 |

== See also ==
- Armenian Premier League
- Armenian First League
