= Alexandru Osipov =

Moldovan footballer

Personal information
- Date of birth: 30 July 2000 (age 26)
- Place of birth: Moldova
- Height: 1.65 m (5 ft 5 in)
- Position: Left winger

Team information
- Current team: Florești
- Number: 21

Youth career
- –2019: Sheriff Tiraspol
- 2019–2020: Leixões

Senior career*
Years	Team	Apps	(Gls)
2019	Lori	8	(0)
2019–2020	Leixões	0	(0)
2020	Florești	11	(0)
2021–2022	Sfântul Gheorghe	29	(1)
2022–2023	Krumovgrad	1	(0)
2023–2025	Florești	47	(6)
2025-2026	Florești	7	(2)

International career^{‡}
2015–2016	Moldova U17	6	(0)
2017–2018	Moldova U19	5	(0)
2020–	Moldova U21	11	(0)
- * Club domestic league appearances and goals as of 21 September 2022 ‡ National team caps and goals as of 3 April 2021

Alexandru Osipov (born 30 July 2000) is a Moldovan footballer who plays as a left winger for the Moldovan Liga 1 Team FC Florești.

== Career ==
Osipov made his professional debut for Florești in the Moldovan National Division on 18 September 2020, starting against Dinamo-Auto Tiraspol before being substituted out in the 36th minute, with the match finishing as a 0–5 away loss.

Osipov signed for Sfântul Gheorghe Suruceni in January 2021. In July 2022, Osipov joined Bulgarian team Krumovgrad.

During the 2024–2025 season, Alexandru Osipov established himself as a key player for Florești in the Moldovan top division, the Super Liga. He featured in 12 matches, accumulating 1,075 minutes of game time, demonstrating consistency and reliability in midfield. While he did not record any goals or assists, his regular presence contributed to the team’s efforts throughout a challenging season that ultimately ended in relegation.

In the following 2025–2026 season, Florești competed in the Liga 1 (Moldovan second division), with Osipov remaining part of the squad. He contributed to a strong start for the club, including providing two assists in a 5–1 opening day victory against Victoria Bardar. This marked a positive turnaround for both the club and Osipov, who assumed a more offensive role in a more favorable competitive environment.

== International career ==
Alexandru Osipov has represented Moldova at various youth international levels, gaining valuable experience in competitive matches across multiple age groups:

- Moldova U17: 6 caps between 2015 and 2017.
- Moldova U19: 5 caps between 2017 and 2019.
- Moldova U21: 11 caps from 2020 to 2023.

These international appearances have helped Osipov develop his technical and tactical skills, enhancing his versatility as a player.

== Personal life ==
Osipov is of Russian descent.

In addition to his Moldovan nationality, Osipov also holds Romanian (EU) citizenship.
