= Yegor Sysuyev =

Russian footballer

Personal information
- Full name: Yegor Sergeyevich Sysuyev
- Date of birth: 1 April 1997 (age 29)
- Place of birth: Saransk, Russia
- Height: 1.92 m (6 ft 4 in)
- Position: Centre back

Youth career
- Mordovia Saransk

Senior career*
Years	Team	Apps	(Gls)
2015–2017	Mordovia Saransk	0	(0)
2016	→ Oryol (loan)	3	(0)
2017–2018	FC Spartak-MAIB Dzhankoy	9	(1)
2018	Junior Sevan		
2019	Granit Mikashevichi	17	(0)
2020	Kaganat		
- * Club domestic league appearances and goals

Yegor Sergeyevich Sysuyev (Russian: Егор Сергеевич Сысуев; born 1 April 1997) is a Russian former football player.

== Club career ==
He made his debut in the Russian Professional Football League for FC Oryol on 20 July 2016 in a game against FC Kaluga.
