= Ubong Friday =

Nigerian footballer

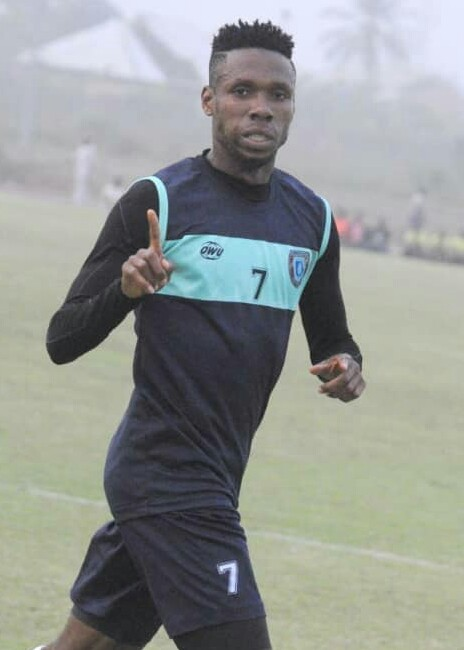
- Friday with Akwa United in 2019

Personal information
- Date of birth: 3 March 1998 (age 28)
- Place of birth: Bonny Island, Nigeria
- Height: 1.72 m (5 ft 8 in)
- Position: Winger

Team information
- Current team: Rivers United
- Number: 7

Youth career
- 2011–2012: Macito

Senior career*
Years	Team	Apps	(Gls)
2012–2014	Akwa Starlets		
2014–2019	Akwa United		
2019	Lori	7	(0)
2019–2024	Akwa United	223	(47)
2024–	Rivers United	43	(7)

International career^{‡}
2017	Nigeria A'	7	(0)
- * Club domestic league appearances and goals as of 27 January 2020 ‡ National team caps and goals as of 28 January 2019

Ubong Friday (born 3 March 1998) is a Nigerian professional footballer who currently plays for Nigerian Professional League club Rivers United and the Nigeria A'. He primarily plays as a winger.

== Club career ==
=== Macito ===
Friday began his career with non-league club, Macito F.C., Uyo, during the 2011–12 football season.

=== Akwa Starlets ===
After a season with Macito F.C., Friday joined NNL club Akwa Starlets at the start of 2012–13 season.

Ubong Friday was part of the Akwa Starlets team that grabbed the headlines in the 2013 Federation Cup, where they eliminated NPFL sides, Kwara United and Dolphins FC ( now Rivers United following a merger with Sharks FC).

The Uyo club beat Kwara United 6–5 on penalties in the Round of 64 fixture at Oghara Township Stadium, after regular time ended a 2–2.

In the Round of 32, Friday's Akwa Starlets ousted Dolphins 4–2 on penalties, after the full 90 minutes failed to produce any goals.

Ubong Friday's Akwa Starlets were on the brink of gaining promotion to the NPFL, but were denied the ticket on the last matchday of NNL Group B by Shooting Stars, who pipped them 1–0 at the Lekan Salami Stadium, Ibadan on Saturday, 15 November 2014.

=== Akwa United ===
Friday moved to Akwa United at the start of the 2014–15 NPFL season. In his first season, he netted six goals to help Akwa United win its first-ever domestic title—the 2015 Federation Cup—with Akwa United beating 2003 champions, Lobi Stars 2–1 in the final at the Teslim Balogun Stadium, Lagos, on 22 November 2015.

The striker-cum-winger netted a hat-trick in the 6–1 thrashing of Zamfara club Dalhatu United F.C. in a Round of 64 game, and followed up with a brace against Nigeria Nationwide League club, Peace Makers FC of Akure in the Round of 32 at the Nnamdi Azikiwe Stadium, Enugu on Wednesday 8 July 2015.

He also found the back of the net in the quarter-finals, against Niger Tornadoes Feeders. The full 90 minutes finished 2–2, but Akwa United prevailed 7–5 on penalties.

The 2015 Federations Cup triumph qualified the club for its first-ever CAF interclub championship.

Ubong Friday scored twice as Maurice Cooreman-led Akwa United beat Plateau United 2–0 in their matchday six fixture at the Godswill Akpabio International Stadium, on Friday, 11 March 2016, to record their second win of the 2015–16 campaign.

Four months later, he was chosen by AfricanFootball.com as the Nigeria League Player of Week 26, after he scored the equaliser to earn Akwa United a 1–1 draw with Plateau United at the Rwang Pam Stadium on Sunday, 10 July 2016.

Friday was chosen ahead of Heartland goalkeeper Ebele Obi, who was outstanding against Enyimba, as Bright Ejike's strike separated the southeast clubs; and El-Kanemi Warriors’ Daniel Japhet, who scored and provided an assist in his team's 3–1 win over MFM.

Ubong Friday was named in the starting line-up of Akwa United's first ever CAF interclub match against Vita Club Mokanda, but was substituted six minutes into the second half, with Emmanuel Ariwachukwu taking his place. Ubong Ekpai's solitary goal, five minutes after the half-hour mark sealed victory for the Uyo-based club on Saturday, 13 February 2016. Ubong Friday played for 63 minutes in the 2nd leg against Vita Club Mokanda, before paving way for Michael Okoro Ibe, as Akwa United crashed out of the 13th edition of the CAF second-tier club competition. Jean Kalupumbu Mukalay scored for the visitors on the 53rd minute to put the Congolese club on level terms on aggregate. The Congolese club went ahead to win 6–5 on penalties after the extra time failed to produce a winner.

Ubong Friday returned to the Akwa United fold on matchday nine fixture against Gombe United on Thursday, 19 February 2017, after being sidelined for six weeks, following an ankle injury he sustained in the matchday two home tie against Rivers United on Wednesday, 18 January 2017.

Ubong Friday won the Matchday 21 Value Added Tax (VAT) Wonder Goal award—an initiative of the Federal Inland Revenue Service (FIRS) – for his goal in the 3–0 home win over ABS at the Godswill Akpabio International Stadium, Uyo on Sunday, 28 May 2017

Friday beat off competitions from FC Ifeanyi forward, Godwin Obaje and Niger Tornadoes winger, Wilfred Ammeh in a poll conducted on the LMC website and Twitter handle between Thursday, 1 June and Sunday, 4 June 2017.

The winger drove a long-range, right-footed effort on the left side, which dipped into the back of the net, leaving the keeper helpless and embarrassed.

The goal attracted 41 percent of total votes on Twitter. More voters (47%) preferred Godwin Obaje's goal in FC Ifeanyiubah's defeat of Kano Pillars, with the remaining 12 percent of the vote going to Niger Tornadoes' Wilfred Ammeh.

On the NPFL website (www.NPFL.ng), though, a whopping 81.1 percent of the voters favoured Friday's goal, while Obaje and Ammeh polled 12.4 and 6.5 percent respectively.

A total of 337 voters participated through the NPFL Twitter handle, while 635 voted on the website poll. The three goals were shortlisted from a total of 23 scored on matchday 21.

Ubong helped Akwa United emerge champions of the Federation Cup for the second time, in 2017. Akwa United—then under Abdu Maikaba—defeated Niger Tornadoes 3–2 on penalties in the final at the Agege Stadium on Sunday, 15 October, after regular time ended goalless.

The 2017 Federations Cup victory qualified the two-time Nigerian FA Cup champion for its second CAF Confederation Cup.

Ubong Friday was voted by ScoreNigeria as Star of the 2017–18 NPFL Week 5, after posting a man-of-the-match performance in Akwa United's 3–0 home win over Kwara United on Sunday, 28 January 2018, to elevate the Promise Keepers to the top of the table.

Ubong scored a goal and provided an assist for Akwa United to record a convincing win in front of their fans.

On Sunday, 8 April 2018, the forward sustained a groin injury in the 2018 CAF Confederation Cup playoff, first leg home tie against Sudanese club Al Hilal, and was ruled out of Akwa United's NPFL matchday 19 game with Enyimba at the U.J. Esuene Stadium, Calabar on Sunday, 29 April 2018.

Ubong Friday started and finished Akwa United first leg of the 2018 CAF Confederation Cup preliminary tie, as they lose 2–1 to visiting Hawks FC of Gambia, on Sunday, 11 February 2018.

Ubong played the entirety of the return leg against Hawks FC, as Olisema's brace at the Independence Stadium, Bakau on 21 February 2018, handed Akwa United a 3–2 aggregate win over the Gambian club and passage to the first round.

Ubong was substituted on the 80th minute by Adeshina Gata, three minutes before Muaid Eisa netted the only goal of the match in Al-Ittihad 1–0 victory over Akwa United.

Coach Abdu Maikaba replaced Ubong Friday with Adeshina Gata on the 71st minute, as Akwa United sealed a 1–0 win courtesy of Aniekeme Asuquo's 46th-minute goal, to go level on aggregate, before edging Al-Ittihad 3–2 on penalties.

Ubong played only 43 minutes of the first half, as Akwa United fell 2–0 to Al-Hilal in the second round (round of 32), first leg, at the Al-Hilal Stadium on Sunday 8 April 2018. He was replaced by Victor Mbaoma.

Ubong Friday copped a groin injury 34 minutes into the game, and was replaced by Katoh Haggai, as Akwa United recorded a 3–1 win over Al-Hilal in the round of 32 return leg tie at the Godswill Akpabio International Stadium on Sunday, 18 April 2018. Denis Nya's first half injury-time goal and Michael Ibe's brace in the second half was not enough to take Akwa United to the group stage, as Al-Hilal's Mohammed Bashir 28' minute goal proved decisive, qualifying the Sudanese club on away goals rule.

=== Lori ===
On 5 March 2019, Armenian Premier League club Lori FC announced the signing of Friday on a 3.5-year contract.

== International career ==
Friday was selected by Coach Salisu Yusuf alongside 17 other NPFL players for the 2017 WAFU Cup hosted by Ghana.

Ubong Friday replaced Samuel Matthias fifteen minutes into the second period as Nigeria knocked out Sierra Leone 2–0 in the WAFU Zone A, first round playoff at the Cape Coast Sports Stadium on Monday, 11 September 2017.

Ubong Friday played the entirety of Nigeria's 0–0 draw with Mali in the second round, opening match on Thursday, 14 September 2017, starting alongside his then club team mates, Aremu Afeez, Ifeanyi Ifeanyi and Gabriel Okechukwu.

In the second group match, Ubong replaced Samuel Mathias 21 minutes into the second half, as Nigeria played out a goalless draw with Syli Nationale of Guinea.

Ubong Friday made his second start at the tournament, as Nigeria beat hosts, Ghana 2–0 to progress to semi-finals, courtesy of early second-half goals from Anthony Okpotu and Peter Eneji. He was replaced by Samuel Mathias eight minutes to the end of regulation time.

Ubong Friday was involved in the semi-final clash against Benin Republic, where Rabiu Ali's first half screamer secured Nigeria's passage to final.

Ubong Friday started in Nigeria's 4–1 defeat to hosts, Ghana in the final at the Cape Coast Sports Stadium on Sunday, 24 September 2017. He was booked in the 25th minute, and was later replaced by Gabriel Okechukwu at the start of the second half.

== Honours ==
=== Club ===
- Nigerian FA Cup: 2

Federation Cup 2015
Aiteo Cup 2017

=== National ===
- WAFU Nations Cup
  - Ghana 2017 – Silver (Nigeria)

=== Individual ===
- 2015 Nigerian FA Cup: Topscorer (6 goals)
