= Sunday Ingbede =

Nigerian footballer

Sunday Ngbede
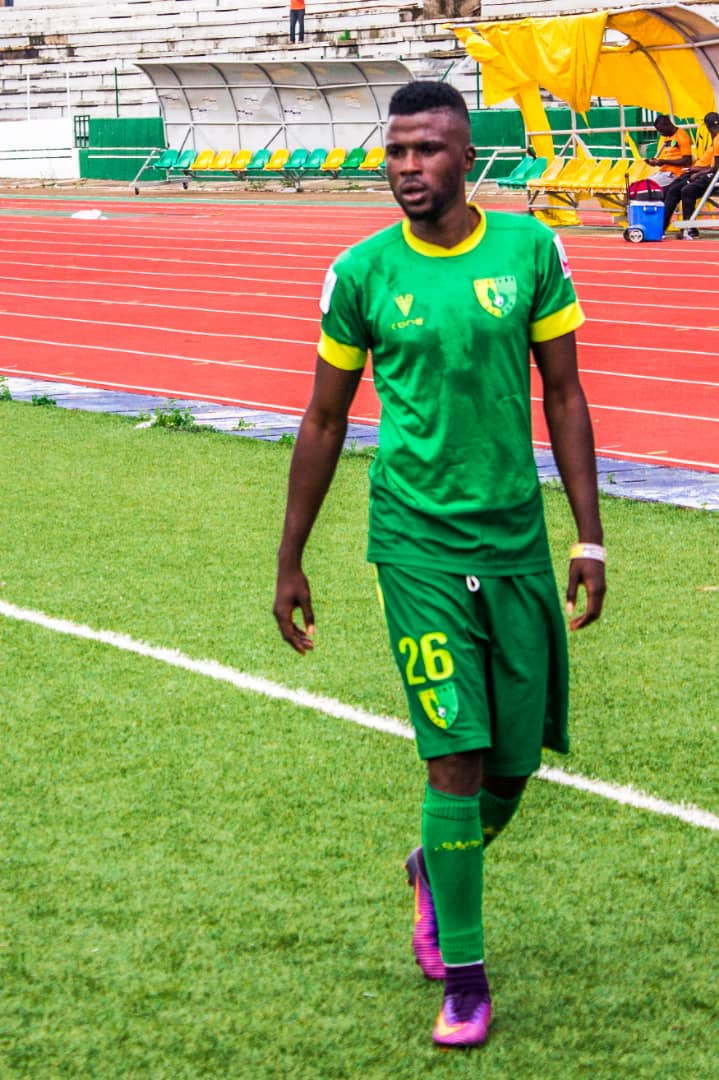

Personal information
- Full name: Sunday Umaru Ngbede
- Date of birth: 23 April 1998 (age 28)
- Place of birth: Jos, Nigeria
- Height: 1.70 m (5 ft 7 in)
- Positions: Winger; forward

Youth career
- 2013–2015: Learning F.C.

Senior career*
Years	Team	Apps	(Gls)
2015–2018	Plateau United	47	(14)
2018—2020	Lori	21	(7)
2020	→ Alashkert (loan)	2	(0)
2020—2021	Alashkert	9	(0)
2021—2022	Noravank	9	(0)
- * Club domestic league appearances and goals as of 17 January 2023

Sunday Umaru Ngbede (born 23 April 1998) is a professional footballer who plays as a left winger. Ngbede won the Nigeria Professional Football League title with Plateau United during the 2016–17 season.

== Early and personal life ==
Ngbede was born in Jos, Plateau State, Nigeria. He started playing football at the age of 5 when he was discovered by an amateur football coach known as "Officer".

Ngbede was nicknamed "Neymar" by Plateau United FC fans because of his style of play which is similar to that of Brazilian and Paris Saint Germaine superstar, Neymar Jr.

Ngbede was a trialist with Norwegian club, Lillestrøm in 2017.

== Youth career ==
=== Learning FC, Bukuru ===
==== 2013/2014 ====
Sunday Ngbede joined amateur football club, Learning F.C. of Bukuru in 2013. He was a regular in the team for their 2014/2015 campaign, helping Learning F.C. gain promotion from the Nigerian Nationwide League National Division Two to National Division One.

On 8 May 2015, Ingbede started and scored the lone goal in Learning FC's one-nil victory over Yarmalight F.C. in the NNWL 2014/2015 season.

Ngbede also scored the equaliser in the 1–1 draw between Gombe Warriors versus Learning F.C. on 14 May 2015.

Ngbede played in the match between Learning FC and Immigration F.C. of Abuja. Learning FC gained promotion to the Nigerian Nationwide League Division One after the game with Immigration F.C. with Ngbede rounding off the campaign with four assists.

== Senior career ==
=== Plateau United FC ===
==== 2015/2016 season ====
Sunday Ngbede signed for Plateau United FC in 2015 after the club gained promotion to the topflight of the Nigerian Professional Football League in 2015/2016 season. Ingbede would later score on his debut for Plateau United FC's 2–1 victory over Yobe Desert Stars in the NPFL.

On 20 March 2016 Ngbede scored the winner in Plateau United FC's 2–1 victory over Lobi Stars of Makurdi. On week 11 of the NPFL, Ngbede would play in his first Jos derby 10 April 2016 in the match between Giwa F.C. and Plateau United FC at the Rwang Pam Stadium. Plateau United won the match by 2–0, Sunday Ngbede doubled the lead after striker, Benjamin Turba first put Plateau United ahead in the 63rd minute.

Ngbede played in the 2–2 draw between Plateau United FC and Sunshine Stars of Akure at the Rwang Pam Stadium in Jos. He was substituted at the latter part of the match.

Sunday Ngbede also made the score sheet when Plateau United FC won 2-nil at home against Enyimba International of Aba.

==== 2016/2017 season ====
Ngbede continued to feature regularly in Plateau United's Nigerian Professional League title winning season 2016/2017 after deciding to stay with the club towards the end of 2016. On 9 September 2017, Sunday Ngbede won the league with Plateau United after they were crowned NPFL Champions for the 2016/2017 season in their 2-nil win at home game against Enugu Rangers.

==== 2017/2018 season ====
In 2018 on the NPFL match day 7, Sunday Ngbede scored in Plateau United F.C.'s 5-nil defeat of Sunshine Stars on 3 February 2018. Ngbede played the entire match when Plateau United FC lost one-nil to Enyimba International F.C. of Aba at the U.J. Esuene Stadium in Calabar on 14 February 2018.

He would later feature in the club's controversial continental campaign, featuring both in the CAF Champions League as well as the CAF Confederations Cup with Plateau United.

Ngbede scored in the 3-nil victory over Eding Sports of Cameroon in Plateau United F.C.’s first ever CAF Champions League match on 10 February 2018 at the New Jos Township Stadium.

On 28 February 2018, Ngbede provided an assist to Plateau United F.C. wingback, Chizoba Amaefule in the 1-nil victory over Gbenga Ogunbote's Rangers FC at the New Jos Township Stadium.

Ingbede played the whole 90 minutes in the CAF Confederations Cup 4-nil loss against USM Algiers on 18 March 2018 in Algeria.

=== Lori ===
Ngbede joined Armenian Premier League side Lori FC on 28 August 2018 on a free transfer signing a three year deal.He played 26 times and scoring 8 goals for Lori FC

=== Alashkert ===
On 22 January 2020, Ingbede joined FC Alashkert on loan from Lori until 31 December 2020. In December 2020 Alashkert made his loan deal permanent on a one year deal. in May 2021 he won the Armenian Premier League with Alashkert. On 15 May he was on the bench as his team lost the Armenian Cup to Ararat Yerevan.

=== Noravank ===
On 14 September 2021, Noravank announced the signing of Ingbede.

== International career ==
Sunday Ngbede was called up for camp in the Nigerian National U-20 team in 2018.

== Career statistics ==
=== Club ===
As of match played 10 December 2021

Appearances and goals by club, season and competition
Club	Season	League			National Cup		Continental		Other		Total	
Club	Season	Division	Apps	Goals	Apps	Goals	Apps	Goals	Apps	Goals	Apps	Goals
Lori	2018–19	Armenian Premier League	21	7	5	1	-		-		26	8
Lori	2019–20	Armenian Premier League	0	0	0	0	-		-		0	0
Lori	2020–21	Armenian Premier League	0	0	0	0	-		-		0	0
Lori	Total		21	7	5	1	-	-	-	-	26	8
Alashkert (loan)	2019–20	Armenian Premier League	2	0	0	0	0 (Note: Appearances in the UEFA Europa League)	0	0 (Note: Appearances in the Armenian Supercup)	0	2	0
Alashkert	2020–21	Armenian Premier League	9	0	3	1	0	0	-		12	1
Noravank	2021–22	Armenian Premier League	9	0	1	0	-				10	0
Career total			41	7	9	2	-	-	-	-	50	9

== Honours ==
Plateau United

- Nigerian Professional Football League: 2016–17

FC Alashkert

- Armenian Premier League: 2020–21
- Armenian Cup runner-up: 2020–21
