= 2021–22 FC Ararat Yerevan season =

Ararat Yerevan
2021–22 season
- President: Hrach Kaprielian
- Manager: Vardan Bichakhchyan (until 11 January); Edgar Torosyan (from 25 January)
- Stadium: Republican Stadium
- Premier League: 4th
- Armenian Cup: Semifinal vs Noravank
- Supercup: Runners Up
- Europa Conference League: Second Qualifying Round vs Śląsk Wrocław
- Top goalscorer: League: Serges Déblé (13); All: Serges Déblé (13)
- Highest home attendance: 2,350 vs Śląsk Wrocław (22 July 2021)
- Lowest home attendance: 200 vs Noravank (24 August 2021)
- Average home league attendance: 1,010 (24 August 2021)
Home colours	Away colours	Third colours

The 2021–22 season was FC Ararat Yerevan's 31st consecutive season in Armenian Premier League, whilst they will also compete in the Armenian Cup and the UEFA Europa Conference League.

== Season events ==
On 18 June, Ararat Yerevan announced the signing of Arsen Sadoyan from Urartu.

On 21 June, Ararat Yerevan announced the signing of Erik Vardanyan from Urartu, and Alik Arakelyan from Pyunik.

On 29 June, Ararat Yerevan announced the signing of Gor Malakyan from Pyunik, with Robert Darbinyan also joining from Pyunik the following day.

On 2 July, Ararat Yerevan announced the signing of Serges Déblé from Viborg.

On 22 July, Ararat Yerevan announced the signing of Isah Aliyu from Urartu.

On 26 July, Ararat Yerevan announced the signing of Iván Díaz from Sereď.

On 1 August, Ararat Yerevan announced that Karen Muradyan had left the club after his contract had expired.

On 25 September, Dimitri Legbo, Armand Dagrou, Sery Narcisse, Sosthène Tiehide and Amara Traoré all joined Ararat Yerevan from RC Abidjan.

On 11 January, Head Coach Vardan Bichakhchyan left Ararat Yerevan by mutual consent.

On 14 January, Ararat Yerevan terminated their contracts with Yacouba Silue and Serges Déblé by mutual consent.

On 25 January, Edgar Torosyan was appointed as Head Coach of Ararat Yerevan.

== Squad ==
As of match played 28 May 2022

Number	Name	Nationality	Position	Date of birth (age)	Signed from	Signed in	Contract ends	Apps.	Goals
Goalkeepers
1	Poghos Ayvazyan	(Armenia)	GK	9 June 1995 (aged 26)	Mika	2016		22	0
13	Arman Simonyan	(Armenia)	GK	28 July 1997 (aged 24)	Unattached	2019		0	0
45	Vsevolod Yermakov	(Russia)	GK	6 January 1996 (aged 26)	Shirak	2020		65	0
Defenders
2	Robert Hakobyan	(Armenia)	DF	22 October 1996 (aged 25)	Shirak	2021		20	1
4	Yuri Magakyan	(Armenia)	DF	22 June 2000 (aged 21)	Youth team	2016		4	0
5	Hrayr Mkoyan	(Armenia)	DF	2 September 1986 (aged 35)	Shirak	2020			
15	Arsen Sadoyan	(Armenia)	DF	16 March 1999 (aged 23)	Urartu	2021		1	0
24	Dimitri Legbo	(Ivory Coast)	DF	29 August 2001 (aged 20)	RC Abidjan	2021		17	1
29	Marko Prljević	(Serbia)	DF	2 August 1988 (aged 33)	Shirak	2020		53	3
33	Hovhannes Nazaryan	(Armenia)	DF	11 March 1998 (aged 24)	Shirak	2021		21	2
44	Juan Bravo	(Colombia)	DF	1 April 1990 (aged 32)	Sportivo Barracas	2020		57	5
99	Robert Darbinyan	(Armenia)	DF	4 October 1995 (aged 26)	Pyunik	2021		22	0
Midfielders
6	Erik Vardanyan	(Armenia)	MF	8 March 1999 (aged 23)	Urartu	2021		1	0
7	Isah Aliyu	(Nigeria)	MF	8 August 1999 (aged 22)	Urartu	2021		34	3
11	David Manoyan	(Armenia)	MF	5 July 1990 (aged 31)	Shirak	2020		67	2
18	Edgar Malakyan	(Armenia)	MF	22 September 1990 (aged 31)	Shirak	2020		51	10
20	Rudik Mkrtchyan	(Armenia)	MF	26 October 1998 (aged 23)	Shirak	2021		25	1
22	Igor Stanojević	(Serbia)	MF	24 October 1991 (aged 30)	Shirak	2021		24	3
23	Gor Malakyan	(Armenia)	MF	12 June 1994 (aged 27)	Pyunik	2021		29	1
25	Armand Dagrou	(Ivory Coast)	MF	30 June 2000 (aged 21)	RC Abidjan	2021		7	0
26	Alik Arakelyan	(Armenia)	MF	21 May 1996 (aged 26)	Pyunik	2021		32	3
27	Iván Díaz	(Argentina)	MF	23 January 1993 (aged 29)	Sereď	2021		32	0
70	Sosthène Tiehide	(Ivory Coast)	MF	10 January 2002 (aged 20)	RC Abidjan	2021		4	0
	Grigor Muradyan	(Armenia)	MF	6 August 2002 (aged 19)	Youth team	2020		3	0
Forwards
9	Razmik Hakobyan	(Armenia)	FW	9 February 1996 (aged 26)	Alashkert	2018		49	4
80	Amara Traoré	(Ivory Coast)	FW	2 January 2001 (aged 21)	RC Abidjan	2021		9	0
Ararat Yerevan II Players
	Aleksandre Saganelidze	(Georgia (country))	DF	9 August 1999 (aged 22)	Unattached	2021		1	0
	Karen Shirkhanyan	(Armenia)	MF	6 April 2000 (aged 22)	Youth Team	2019		4	0
	Arame Tsaturyan	(Armenia)	MF	7 August 2001 (aged 20)	Youth Team	2018		0	0
Players away on loan
16	Serob Galstyan	(Armenia)	MF	23 September 2002 (aged 19)	Torpedo Yerevan	2020		1	0
Players who left during the season
8	Zhirayr Margaryan	(Armenia)	DF	13 September 1997 (aged 24)	Shirak	2020		44	0
10	Serges Déblé	(Ivory Coast)	FW	1 October 1989 (aged 32)	Viborg	2021		16	13
17	Yacouba Silue	(Ivory Coast)	FW	1 January 2002 (aged 20)	Shirak	2021		19	8
19	Karen Muradyan	(Armenia)	MF	1 November 1992 (aged 29)	Shirak	2020		31	0
55	Dimitrije Pobulić	(Serbia)	MF	10 May 1994 (aged 28)	Grafičar Beograd	2021		38	8
77	Sery Narcisse	(Ivory Coast)	MF	30 December 2000 (aged 21)	RC Abidjan	2021		1	0
98	Mory Kone	(Ivory Coast)	FW	13 July 1995 (aged 26)	Shirak	2020		32	15

== Transfers ==
=== In ===
Date	Position	Nationality	Name	From	Fee	Ref.
18 June 2021	DF	(Armenia)	Arsen Sadoyan	Urartu	Undisclosed	
21 June 2021	MF	(Armenia)	Alik Arakelyan	Pyunik	Undisclosed	
21 June 2021	MF	(Armenia)	Erik Vardanyan	Urartu	Undisclosed	
29 June 2021	MF	(Armenia)	Gor Malakyan	Pyunik	Undisclosed	
30 June 2021	DF	(Armenia)	Robert Darbinyan	Pyunik	Undisclosed	
1 July 2021	DF	(Armenia)	Robert Hakobyan	Shirak	Undisclosed	
1 July 2021	FW	(Ivory Coast)	Yacouba Silue	Shirak	Undisclosed	
2 July 2021	FW	(Ivory Coast)	Serges Déblé	Viborg	Undisclosed	
22 July 2021	MF	(Nigeria)	Isah Aliyu	Urartu	Undisclosed	
26 July 2021	MF	(Argentina)	Iván Díaz	Sereď	Undisclosed	
25 September 2021	DF	(Ivory Coast)	Dimitri Legbo	RC Abidjan	Undisclosed	
25 September 2021	MF	(Ivory Coast)	Armand Dagrou	RC Abidjan	Undisclosed	
25 September 2021	MF	(Ivory Coast)	Sery Narcisse	RC Abidjan	Undisclosed	
25 September 2021	MF	(Ivory Coast)	Sosthène Tiehide	RC Abidjan	Undisclosed	
25 September 2021	FW	(Ivory Coast)	Amara Traoré	RC Abidjan	Undisclosed	

=== Out ===
Date	Position	Nationality	Name	To	Fee	Ref.
18 June 2021	MF	(Ukraine)	Maksym Zaderaka	Metalist 1925 Kharkiv	Undisclosed	
16 July 2021	MF	(Armenia)	Aghvan Papikyan	Alashkert	Undisclosed	
21 September 2021	FW	(Ivory Coast)	Mory Kone	Újpest	Undisclosed	
17 January 2022	DF	(Armenia)	Zhirayr Margaryan	Veres Rivne	Undisclosed	
27 February 2022	MF	(Serbia)	Dimitrije Pobulić	Bunyodkor	Undisclosed	
20 March 2022	MF	(Ivory Coast)	Sery Narcisse	ASEC Mimosas	Undisclosed	

=== Loans out ===
Date from	Position	Nationality	Name	To	Date to	Ref.
29 July 2021	MF	(Armenia)	Serob Galstyan	BKMA Yerevan	Undisclosed	
29 July 2021	MF	(Armenia)	Grigor Muradyan	BKMA Yerevan	12 January 2022	

=== Released ===
Date	Position	Nationality	Name	Joined	Date	Ref.
11 June 2021	GK	(Armenia)	Grigor Meliksetyan	Pyunik		
11 June 2021	DF	(Spain)	Christian Jiménez	Hegelmann Litauen	21 June 2021	
11 June 2021	DF	(Ukraine)	Ivan Spychka	Shukura Kobuleti		
11 June 2021	MF	(Armenia)	Zaven Badoyan	Van		
11 June 2021	MF	(Armenia)	Seroj Titizian	BKMA Yerevan		
11 June 2021	MF	(Russia)	David Khurtsidze	Alashkert	2 July 2021	
14 June 2021	MF	(Armenia)	Artak Yedigaryan	Alashkert	2 July 2021	
24 June 2021	DF	(Armenia)	Artur Danielyan	Sevan	24 June 2021	
24 June 2021	FW	(Serbia)	Uroš Nenadović	Taraz	26 June 2021	
1 August 2021	MF	(Armenia)	Karen Muradyan	Ararat-Armenia	4 August 2021	
14 January 2022	FW	(Ivory Coast)	Serges Déblé	Pyunik	27 January 2022	
14 January 2022	FW	(Ivory Coast)	Yacouba Silue	SKN St. Pölten	7 February 2022	
31 May 2021	FW	(Armenia)	Grigor Muradyan	Shirak		

== Friendlies ==
22 January 2022	Ararat Yerevan	2–1	Shirak	Dzoraghbyur
14:00 (UTC+4)	15' (o.g.); Aliyu 43'	Report	A.Gevorgyan 21'	Stadium: Dzoraghbyur Training Centre

26 January 2022	Urartu	3–0	Ararat Yerevan	Yerevan
14:00 (UTC+4)	Polyakov 14'; Melkonyan 78', 88'	Report		Stadium: Urartu-3 Stadium

29 January 2022	Ararat Yerevan	0–0	BKMA Yerevan	Yerevan
13:00 (UTC+4)		Report		Stadium: FFA Academy Stadium

5 February 2022	Ararat Yerevan	3–0	Shirak	Dzoraghbyur
(UTC+4)	E.Malakyan 10', 37'; Aliyu 71'	Report		Stadium: Dzoraghbyur Training Centre

12 February 2022	Ararat Yerevan	2–2	Noravank	Charentsavan
(UTC+4)	Arakelyan 13'; R.Mkrtchyan 62'	Report	Goal	Stadium: Charentsavan City Stadium

== Competitions ==
=== Overall record ===
Competition	First match	Last match	Starting round	Final position	Record							
Competition	First match	Last match	Starting round	Final position	Pld	W	D	L	GF	GA	GD	Win %
Premier League	2 August 2021	28 May 2022	Matchday 1	4th	32	13	7	12	47	36	+11	40.63
Armenian Cup	25 November 2021	2 April 2022	Quarterfinal	Semifinal	2	1	0	1	2	2	+0	50.00
Supercup	24 September 2021		Final	Runners Up	1	0	0	1	0	1	−1	0.00
UEFA Europa Conference League	8 July 2021	29 July 2021	First qualifying round	Second qualifying round	4	1	2	1	8	8	+0	25.00
Total					39	15	9	15	57	47	+10	38.46

Last updated: 28 May 2022
Source: Competitions

=== Supercup ===
24 September 2021	Alashkert	1–0	Ararat Yerevan	Yerevan
18:30 (UTC+4)	Boljević (yellow card) 13'; Embaló 55'; Gome (yellow card) 76'; Yurchenko (yellow card) 91'	Report	Mkoyan (yellow card) 89'	Stadium: FFA Academy Stadium; Attendance: 800; Referee: Ashot Ghaltakchyan

=== Premier League ===
==== Results summary ====
Overall								Home						Away					
Pld	W	D	L	GF	GA	GD	Pts	W	D	L	GF	GA	GD	W	D	L	GF	GA	GD
32	13	7	12	47	36	+11	46	7	3	6	26	16	+10	6	4	6	21	20	+1

Last updated: 28 May 2022.
Source: See Results

==== Results by round ====
Round	1	2	3	4	5	6	7	8	9	10	11	12	13	14	15	16	17	18	19	20	21	22	23	24	25	26	27	28	29	30	31	32	33	34	35	36
Ground	H	A	H	A	H	H	A	H	A	A	H	A	H	A	A	H (Note: Between matchday 15 and 16, Sevan were expelled from the league.)	A	H	H	A	H	A	A	H	A	H	A	A	H	A	H	H	A	H	A	H
Result	W	W	W	V	W	W	W	L	L	D	W	D	V	D	L	W	W	L	D	W	D	V	W	L	L	L	L	D	D	W	V	W	L	L	L	L
Position	1	1	1	2	2	2	2	2	2	2	2	3	3	3	3	3	3	3	3	3	3	3	3	3	3	3	3	3	3	3	3	3	3	3	4	4

Updated to match(es) played on 28 May 2022. Source: See Results
A = Away; H = Home; W = Win; D = Draw; L = Loss; V = Void

==== Results ====
2 August 2021 1	Ararat Yerevan	7–1	Noah	Yerevan
19:00 (UTC+4)	Arakelyan 19'; Déblé 34', 42'; Y.Silue 37', 54', 61'; H.Nazaryan (yellow card) 51'; E.Malakyan 74'	Report	Kireyenko 24' (yellow card) 40'; Kovalenko (red card) 25'; Oliveira (yellow card) 45'	Stadium: Republican Stadium; Attendance: 300; Referee: Henrik Nalbandyan

8 August 2021 2	Van	0–1	Ararat Yerevan	Charentsavan
17:00 (UTC+4)	E.Mireku (red card) 34'	Report	Déblé 53'	Stadium: Charentsavan City Stadium; Attendance: 700; Referee: Zaven Hovhannisyan

15 August 2021 3	Ararat Yerevan	2–0	Urartu	Yerevan
20:00 (UTC+4)	Manoyan (yellow card) 47'; D.Pobulić (yellow card) 52'; Y.Silue 72'; R.Mkrtchyan (yellow card) 76'; Stanojević 88'	Report	H.Hakobyan (yellow card) 56'	Stadium: Republican Stadium; Attendance: 700; Referee: Ashot Ghaltakchyan

19 August 2021 4	Sevan	v	Ararat Yerevan	Yerevan
17:00 (UTC+4)	Rudoselsky 8'; Poghosyan (yellow card) 90+1'; E.Jatta 90+2'; Kartashyan (yellow card) 90+3'	Report	D.Pobulić (yellow card) 43'; J.Bravo (yellow card) 46'	Stadium: Alashkert Stadium; Attendance: 500; Referee: Zaven Hovhannisyan
Note: Match declared void on 1 December 2021.

24 August 2021 5	Ararat Yerevan	3–2	Noravank	Gyumri
16:00 (UTC+4)	Arakelyan 3'; Déblé 32', 83'	Report	Bashilov (yellow card) 51'; Zonjić (yellow card) 59'; Ebert 83' (yellow card) 86'; A.Mkrtchyan 90'	Stadium: City Stadium; Attendance: 200; Referee: Vardan Manukyan
Note: Match played at the City Stadium, in Gyumri instead of Ararat Yerevan's regular Republican Stadium in Yerevan.

11 September 2021 6	Ararat Yerevan	3–2	Alashkert	Yerevan
17:00 (UTC+4)	Déblé 31', 44' (red card) 70'; Y.Silue 76'	Report	Glišić 29' (yellow card) 45'; Embaló 90' (pen.); Milinković (yellow card) 90'	Stadium: Republican Stadium; Attendance: 400; Referee: Henrik Nalbandyan

21 September 2021 7	BKMA Yerevan	0–2	Ararat Yerevan	Yerevan
16:00 (UTC+4)	V.Samsonyan (yellow card) 11'; A.Serobyan (yellow card) 17'	Report	Y.Silue 31'; Mkoyan (yellow card) 90'; Aliyu 90+4'	Stadium: FFA Academy Stadium; Attendance: 350; Referee: Vardan Manukyan

27 September 2021 8	Ararat Yerevan	0–1	Pyunik	Yerevan
20:00 (UTC+4)	E.Malakyan (yellow card) 15'	Report	Caraballo 26'; Harutyunyan (yellow card) 47'; Musalov (yellow card) 72'; Carlitos (yellow card) 79'; Buchnev (yellow card) 84'; Gajić (yellow card) 86'; E.Movsesyan (yellow card) 90+2'	Stadium: Republican Stadium; Attendance: 800; Referee: Zaven Hovhannisyan

15 October 2021 9	Ararat-Armenia	3–0	Ararat Yerevan	Yerevan
16:00 (UTC+4)	Lima 61'; Otubanjo 66', 90+6'; Klymenchuk (yellow card) 87'	Report	G.Malakyan (yellow card) 12'; Aliyu (yellow card) 63'; R.Mkrtchyan (yellow card) 89'	Stadium: FFA Academy Stadium; Referee: Zaven Hovhannisyan

22 October 2021 10	Noah	2–2	Ararat Yerevan	Yerevan
18:00 (UTC+4)	Kireyenko 30' (yellow card) 90'; Gabarayev (yellow card) 52'; H.Nazaryan 54' (o.g.); Paireli (yellow card) 90+2'	Report	G.Malakyan (yellow card) 59'; J.Bravo (yellow card) 63'; H.Nazaryan 66'; E.Malakyan 76'; Manoyan (yellow card) 90+2'	Stadium: FFA Academy Stadium; Referee: Artem Gasparyan

26 October 2021 11	Ararat Yerevan	1–0	Van	Gyumri
13:45 (UTC+4)	Déblé 54'; Prljević (yellow card) 64'	Report	Stepanov (yellow card) 76'	Stadium: City Stadium; Attendance: 50; Referee: Artur Tavakalyan

30 October 2021 12	Urartu	1–1	Ararat Yerevan	Yerevan
19:30 (UTC+4)	S.Mkrtchyan 90+1'	Report	E.Malakyan 46'	Stadium: Urartu Stadium; Attendance: 800; Referee: Ashot Ghaltakchyan

7 November 2021 13	Ararat Yerevan	v	Sevan	Yerevan
15:00 (UTC+4)	D.Pobulić 9'; Prljević (yellow card) 21'; Déblé 24'; V.Yermakov (yellow card) 49'; J.Bravo (yellow card) 61'; Arakelyan 69'	Report	Duranski (yellow card) 53'; A.Mensalão (yellow card) 54'; Aleksić 59' (yellow card) 88'	Stadium: Republican Stadium; Attendance: 1,000; Referee: Artem Gasparyan
Note: Match declared void on 1 December 2021.

18 November 2021 14	Noravank	1–1	Ararat Yerevan	Charentsavan
14:00 (UTC+4)	Orlov (yellow card) 34'; Mustafin (yellow card) 61' (goal) 67'; A.Khachatryan (yellow card) 78'	Report	Déblé 11'; Y.Silue (yellow card) 86'	Stadium: Charentsavan City Stadium; Attendance: 50; Referee: Vardan Manukyan

30 November 2021 15	Alashkert	1–0	Ararat Yerevan	Yerevan
14:00 (UTC+4)	Fofana 6'; Voskanyan (yellow card) 37'; Čančarević (yellow card) 63'; Glišić (yellow card) 79'; D.Dosa (yellow card) 88'	Report	Darbinyan (yellow card) 10'; Y.Silue (yellow card) 63'; J.Bravo (yellow card) 90+5'	Stadium: Alashkert Stadium; Attendance: 70; Referee: Zaven Hovhannisyan

4 December 2021 16	Ararat Yerevan	2–1	BKMA Yerevan	Yerevan
17:00 (UTC+4)	Déblé 7'; Aliyu (yellow card) 80'; D.Pobulić 84'	Report	P.Manukyan (yellow card) 4'; G.Petrosyan (yellow card) 40'; D.Aghbalyan 70'; S.Mkrtchyan (yellow card) 72'	Stadium: Republican Stadium; Attendance: 250; Referee: Henrik Nalbandyan

11 December 2021 17	Pyunik	2–6	Ararat Yerevan	Yerevan
17:00 (UTC+4)	Firmino 23', 88' (pen.); Baranov (yellow card) 63'; Harutyunyan (yellow card) 66'	Report	G.Malakyan (yellow card) 6'; Déblé 11', 14', 22'; J.Bravo (yellow card) 27'; D.Pobulić 47', 70'; Arakelyan 66'; Ra.Hakobyan (yellow card) 90+2'	Stadium: Republican Stadium; Attendance: 250; Referee: Henrik Nalbandyan

19 February 2022 18	Ararat Yerevan	0–1	Ararat-Armenia	Charentsavan
14:00 (UTC+4)		Report	Lima 28'; Terteryan (yellow card) 59'	Stadium: Charentsavan City Stadium; Referee: Henrik Nalbandyan

24 February 2022 19	Ararat Yerevan	1–1	Noah	Charentsavan
14:00 (UTC+4)	E.Malakyan 70'; Mkoyan (yellow card) 83'	Report	A.Oliveira 46'; Kartashyan (yellow card) 86'; Oancea (yellow card) 90+1'	Stadium: Charentsavan City Stadium; Referee: Zaven Hovhannisyan

1 March 2022 20	Van	0–1	Ararat Yerevan	Charentsavan
17:00 (UTC+4)		Report	G.Malakyan 17'; Darbinyan (yellow card) 37'; Díaz (yellow card) 71'; Prljević (yellow card) 78'	Stadium: Charentsavan City Stadium; Referee: Shahen Aghayan

5 March 2022 21	Ararat Yerevan	0–0	Urartu	Yerevan
17:00 (UTC+4)	G.Malakyan (yellow card) 53'; H.Nazaryan (yellow card) 89'	Report	K.Ayvazyan (yellow card) 63'; E.Grigoryan (yellow card) 64'	Stadium: Republican Stadium; Referee: Henrik Nalbandyan

9/11 March 2021 22	Sevan	BYE	Ararat Yerevan	Yerevan
(UTC+4)				Stadium: Alashkert Stadium
Note: Sevan expelled from the league on 1 December 2021.

15 March 2022 23	Noravank	0–1	Ararat Yerevan	Charentsavan
15:00 (UTC+4)	A.Khachatryan (yellow card) 39'; Yenne (yellow card) 53'; Mustafin (yellow card) 77'	Report	R.Mkrtchyan 33'; Ra.Hakobyan (yellow card) 40'; J.Bravo (yellow card) 49'; Aliyu (yellow card) 81'	Stadium: Charentsavan City Stadium; Referee: Henrik Nalbandyan

19 March 2022 24	Ararat Yerevan	0–1	Alashkert	Yerevan
15:30 (UTC+4)	J.Bravo (yellow card) 89'	Report	V.Ayvazyan (yellow card) 22'; Embaló 49' (yellow card) 89'	Stadium: Republican Stadium; Referee: Shahen Aghayan

6 April 2022 25	BKMA Yerevan	3–2	Ararat Yerevan	Yerevan
19:00 (UTC+4)	N.Alaverdyan 1'; D.Aghbalyan (yellow card) 38'; A.Galstyan (yellow card) 45'; M.Mirzoyan (yellow card) 58'; G.Petrosyan 62'; E.Simonyan (yellow card) 77'; S.Mkrtchyan (yellow card) 89'; A.Nahapetyan 90+2'	Report	Mkoyan (yellow card) 30'; Ra.Hakobyan 43' (pen.); Ro.Hakobyan 76'	Stadium: FFA Academy Stadium; Referee: Ashot Ghaltakchyan

11 April 2022 26	Ararat Yerevan	1–2	Pyunik	Yerevan
18:00 (UTC+4)	Aliyu 52'; Darbinyan (red card) 85'	Report	Caraballo 12'; Bratkov (yellow card) 38'; Déblé 73'; Nenadović (yellow card) 75'	Stadium: Republican Stadium; Referee: Artem Gasparyan

15 April 2022 27	Ararat-Armenia	3–1	Ararat Yerevan	Yerevan
15:00 (UTC+4)	Romércio (yellow card) 22' (yellow-red card) 41'; Alemão 27'; Lima 51'; V.Yermakov 70' (o.g.); Bueno (yellow card) 89'	Report	Ra.Hakobyan 42'; Aliyu (yellow card) 58' (yellow-red card) 63'	Stadium: FFA Academy Stadium; Referee: Vardan Manukyan

19 April 2022 28	Noah	0–0	Ararat Yerevan	Armavir
15:00 (UTC+4)		Report	Arakelyan (yellow card) 30'; Ro.Hakobyan (yellow card) 33'; G.Malakyan (yellow card) 85'	Stadium: Armavir City Stadium; Referee: Ashot Ghaltakchyan

23 April 2022 29	Ararat Yerevan	1–1	Van	Yerevan
19:00 (UTC+4)	R.Mkrtchyan (yellow card) 65'; Díaz (yellow card) 71'; J.Bravo 73'	Report	E.Mireku (yellow card) 68'; J.Clifford 78'	Stadium: Republican Stadium; Referee: Artem Gasparyan

28 April 2022 30	Urartu	1–2	Ararat Yerevan	Yerevan
19:30 (UTC+4)	E.Grigoryan (red card) 8'; S.Mkrtchyan (yellow card) 52'; Miranyan 72'	Report	E.Malakyan 41'; H.Nazaryan (yellow card) 45+5' (yellow-red card) 62'; Legbo (yellow card) 45+7'; Manoyan 77' (yellow card) 90+2'; Stanojević (yellow card) 90+5'	Stadium: Urartu Stadium; Referee: Zaven Hovhannisyan

1–3 May 2022 31	Ararat Yerevan	BYE	Sevan	Yerevan
(UTC+4)				Stadium: Republican Stadium
Note: Sevan expelled from the league on 1 December 2021.

11 May 2022 32	Ararat Yerevan	4–0	Noravank	Yerevan
19:30 (UTC+4)	J.Bravo 45+3'; E.Malakyan 59', 63'; Aliyu 88'	Report	Orlov (yellow card) 13' (yellow-red card) 37'	Stadium: Republican Stadium; Referee: Artem Gasparyan

15 May 2022 33	Alashkert	2–1	Ararat Yerevan	Yerevan
16:00 (UTC+4)	James 88'; Kadio 17' (yellow card) 68'; Embaló (yellow card) 36' (yellow-red card) 36'; Čančarević (yellow card) 86'	Report	Manoyan (yellow card) 37'; Stanojević 65' (pen.); Legbo (yellow card) 73'	Stadium: Alashkert Stadium; Referee: Zaven Hovhannisyan

20 May 2022 34	Ararat Yerevan	1–2	BKMA Yerevan	Yerevan
19:00 (UTC+4)	Prljević 86'	Report	S.Mkrtchyan (yellow card) 7'; N.Alaverdyan 53'; A.Serobyan (yellow card) 71'; E.Movsesyan 77'; V.Samsonyan (yellow card) 81'; A.Khamoyan (yellow card) 90'	Stadium: Republican Stadium; Referee: Vardan Manukyan

24 May 2022 35	Pyunik	1–0	Ararat Yerevan	Yerevan
19:15 (UTC+4)	Déblé 30'; Harutyunyan (yellow card) 36'; González (yellow card) 58'; Firmino (yellow card) 89'	Report	G.Malakyan (yellow card) 90+4'; Mkoyan (yellow card) 90+6'	Stadium: Republican Stadium; Referee: Artem Gasparyan

28 May 2022 36	Ararat Yerevan	0–1	Ararat-Armenia	Yerevan
19:00 (UTC+4)	A.Dagrou (yellow card) 88'	Report	Z.Shaghoyan 38'; Terteryan (yellow card) 77'; Romércio (yellow card) 79'	Stadium: Republican Stadium; Referee: Vardan Manukyan

==== Table ====
Pos	Team	Pld	W	D	L	GF	GA	GD	Pts	Qualification or relegation
1	Pyunik (C)	32	23	6	3	52	25	+27	75	Qualification for the Champions League first qualifying round
2	Ararat-Armenia	32	23	5	4	56	20	+36	74	Qualification for the Europa Conference League second qualifying round (Note: The 2021–22 Armenian Cup winners, Noravank, did not obtain an UEFA license and was replaced.)
3	Alashkert	32	14	9	9	38	30	+8	51	Qualification for the Europa Conference League first qualifying round
4	Ararat Yerevan	32	13	7	12	47	36	+11	46	Qualification for the Europa Conference League first qualifying round
5	Urartu	32	9	13	10	37	32	+5	40	
6	Noah	32	9	12	11	38	43	−5	39	
7	Noravank	32	7	7	18	36	55	−19	28	
8	Van	32	6	7	19	19	47	−28	25	
9	BKMA (O)	32	4	6	22	25	60	−35	18	Qualification to the relegation play-offs
10	Sevan (D, R)	0	0	0	0	0	0	0	0	Relegation to the Armenian First League (Note: Sevan was expelled from the league on 1 December 2021.)

Source: FFA Soccerway
Rules for classification: 1) Points; 2) Head-to-head points; 3) Head-to-head goal difference; 4) Head-to-head goals scored; 5) Matches won; 6) Goal difference; 7) Less red cards; 8) Less yellow cards; 9) Fair-play ranking 10) Draw
(C) Champions; (D) Disqualified; (O) Play-off winners; (R) Relegated

=== Armenian Cup ===
25 November 2021 Quarterfinal	Ararat Yerevan	1–0	Noah	Yerevan
18:00 (UTC+4)	H.Nazaryan 31'; E.Malakyan (yellow card) 41'; Díaz (yellow card) 69'; G.Malakyan (yellow card) 86'; Mkoyan (yellow card) 90+3'	Report	G.Matevosyan (yellow card) 31'; S.Gomes 85'	Stadium: Republican Stadium; Referee: Artem Gasparyan

2 April 2022 Semifinal	Ararat Yerevan	1–2	Noravank	Yerevan
18:00 (UTC+4)	R.Mkrtchyan (yellow card) 17'; Legbo 46'; Mkoyan (yellow card) 90+3'	Report	Rudoselsky 2'; A.Khachatryan (yellow card) 8' (yellow-red card) 35'; A.Avagyan (yellow card) 53'; Mustafin (yellow card) 63'; Bashilov 68'; A.Mkrtchyan (yellow card) 90+2'	Stadium: Republican Stadium; Referee: Henrik Nalbandyan

=== UEFA Europa Conference League ===
==== Qualifying rounds ====
8 July 2021 First qualifying round 1st leg	Fehérvár (Hungary)	1–1	(Armenia) Ararat Yerevan	Székesfehérvár, Hungary
22:00 (UTC+4)	Houri (yellow card) 59'; Bamgboye (yellow card) 67'; Négo (yellow card) 76'; Heister 84'	Report	Manoyan (yellow card) 39'; D.Pobulić (yellow card) 45+1' (goal) 90+3'; Mkoyan (yellow card) 90+2'; M.Kone (yellow card) 90+3'	Stadium: MOL Aréna Sóstó; Attendance: 2,846; Referee: Ion Orlic (Moldova)

15 July 2021 First qualifying round 2nd leg	Ararat Yerevan (Armenia)	2–0 (3–1 agg.)	(Hungary) Fehérvár	Gyumri, Armenia
17:00 (UTC+4)	D.Pobulić 33' (yellow card) 43'; Y.Silue 85'; Ro.Hakobyan (yellow card) 87'	Report	Négo (yellow card) 87'	Stadium: Gyumri City Stadium; Attendance: 1,500; Referee: Igor Pajac (Croatia)
Note: Match played at the Gyumri City Stadium in Gyumri, Armenia, instead of Ararat Yerevan's regular stadium Vazgen Sargsyan Republican Stadium, Yerevan, due to the proximity of another match.

22 July 2021 Second qualifying round 1st leg	Ararat Yerevan (Armenia)	2–4	(Poland) Śląsk Wrocław	Gyumri, Armenia
17:00 (UTC+4)	M.Kone (yellow card) 27'; Déblé (yellow card) 28'; E.Malakyan (yellow card) 33'; J.Bravo 49' (yellow card) 53'; Ra.Hakobyan 84'	Report	Golla 20'; Piasecki 50'; Pich 70', 90+1'; S.Lewkot (yellow card) 78'; Štiglec (yellow card) 82'; Szromnik (yellow card) 87'; Golla (yellow card) 90+5'	Stadium: Gyumri City Stadium; Attendance: 2,350; Referee: Nikola Popov (Bulgaria)
Note: Match played at the Gyumri City Stadium in Gyumri, Armenia, instead of Ararat Yerevan's regular stadium Vazgen Sargsyan Republican Stadium, Yerevan, due to the proximity of another match.

29 July 2021 Second qualifying round 2nd leg	Śląsk Wrocław (Poland)	3–3 (7–5 agg.)	(Armenia) Ararat Yerevan	Wrocław, Poland
22:00 (UTC+4)	Pich 2', 65'; S.Lewkot 58' (yellow card) 77'	Report	M.Kone 40', 42'; Z.Margaryan (yellow card) 63'; Y.Silue (yellow card) 75' (goal) 89'	Stadium: Stadion Wrocław; Referee: Iwan Arwel Griffith (Wales)

== Statistics ==
As of match played 28 May 2022

=== Appearances and goals ===
No.	Pos	Nat	Player	Total		Premier League		Armenian Cup		Supercup		UEFA Europa Conference League	
No.	Pos	Nat	Player	Apps	Goals	Apps	Goals	Apps	Goals	Apps	Goals	Apps	Goals
1	GK	(Armenia) ARM	Poghos Ayvazyan	1	0	0	0	0	0	1	0	0	0
2	DF	(Armenia) ARM	Robert Hakobyan	20	1	5+11	1	0+1	0	1	0	0+2	0
4	DF	(Armenia) ARM	Yuri Magakyan	3	0	2+1	0	0	0	0	0	0	0
5	DF	(Armenia) ARM	Hrayr Mkoyan	35	0	28	0	2	0	1	0	4	0
6	MF	(Armenia) ARM	Erik Vardanyan	1	0	0+1	0	0	0	0	0	0	0
7	MF	(Nigeria) NGR	Isah Aliyu	34	3	17+13	3	1+1	0	1	0	0+1	0
9	FW	(Armenia) ARM	Razmik Hakobyan	28	3	10+11	2	1+1	0	1	0	0+4	1
11	MF	(Armenia) ARM	David Manoyan	39	1	22+10	1	2	0	0+1	0	2+2	0
15	DF	(Armenia) ARM	Arsen Sadoyan	1	0	0	0	0	0	1	0	0	0
18	MF	(Armenia) ARM	Edgar Malakyan	33	7	26+2	7	1	0	0	0	3+1	0
20	MF	(Armenia) ARM	Rudik Mkrtchyan	25	1	15+8	1	1	0	1	0	0	0
22	MF	(Serbia) SRB	Igor Stanojević	14	2	0+11	2	0	0	0	0	1+2	0
23	MF	(Armenia) ARM	Gor Malakyan	29	1	18+8	1	0+1	0	1	0	0+1	0
24	DF	(Ivory Coast) CIV	Dimitri Legbo	17	1	14+2	0	1	1	0	0	0	0
25	MF	(Ivory Coast) CIV	Armand Dagrou	7	0	1+5	0	0+1	0	0	0	0	0
26	MF	(Armenia) ARM	Alik Arakelyan	32	3	22+4	3	1	0	0+1	0	4	0
27	MF	(Argentina) ARG	Iván Díaz	32	0	21+8	0	2	0	0+1	0	0	0
29	DF	(Serbia) SRB	Marko Prljević	27	1	19+2	1	1	0	1	0	4	0
33	DF	(Armenia) ARM	Hovhannes Nazaryan	21	2	18+2	1	1	1	0	0	0	0
44	DF	(Colombia) COL	Juan Bravo	33	3	22+5	2	1	0	1	0	4	1
45	GK	(Russia) RUS	Vsevolod Yermakov	38	0	32	0	2	0	0	0	4	0
70	MF	(Ivory Coast) CIV	Sosthène Tiehide	4	0	2+2	0	0	0	0	0	0	0
77	MF	(Ivory Coast) CIV	Sery Narcisse	1	0	0+1	0	0	0	0	0	0	0
80	FW	(Ivory Coast) CIV	Amara Traoré	9	0	2+6	0	0+1	0	0	0	0	0
99	DF	(Armenia) ARM	Robert Darbinyan	23	0	13+8	0	2	0	0	0	0	0
Players away on loan:
Players who left Ararat Yerevan during the season:
8	DF	(Armenia) ARM	Zhirayr Margaryan	21	0	14+1	0	1	0	0+1	0	4	0
10	FW	(Ivory Coast) CIV	Serges Déblé	16	13	12	13	0	0	0	0	3+1	0
17	FW	(Ivory Coast) CIV	Yacouba Silue	19	8	5+8	6	1	0	1	0	0+4	2
19	MF	(Armenia) ARM	Karen Muradyan	3	0	0	0	0	0	0	0	3	0
55	MF	(Serbia) SRB	Dimitrije Pobulić	21	5	12+3	3	1	0	0+1	0	4	2
98	FW	(Ivory Coast) CIV	Mory Kone	4	2	0	0	0	0	0	0	4	2

=== Goal scorers ===
Place	Position	Nation	Number	Name	Premier League	Armenian Cup	Supercup	UEFA Europa Conference League	Total
1	FW	(Ivory Coast)	10	Serges Déblé	13	0	0	0	13
2	FW	(Ivory Coast)	17	Yacouba Silue	6	0	0	2	8
3	MF	(Armenia)	18	Edgar Malakyan	7	0	0	0	7
4	MF	(Serbia)	55	Dimitrije Pobulić	3	0	0	2	5
5	MF	(Armenia)	26	Alik Arakelyan	3	0	0	0	3
5	MF	(Nigeria)	7	Isah Aliyu	3	0	0	0	3
5	FW	(Armenia)	9	Razmik Hakobyan	2	0	0	1	3
5	DF	(Colombia)	44	Juan Bravo	2	0	0	1	3
9	MF	(Serbia)	22	Igor Stanojević	2	0	0	0	2
9	DF	(Armenia)	33	Hovhannes Nazaryan	1	1	0	0	2
9	FW	(Ivory Coast)	98	Mory Kone	0	0	0	2	2
12	MF	(Armenia)	23	Gor Malakyan	1	0	0	0	1
12	MF	(Armenia)	20	Rudik Mkrtchyan	1	0	0	0	1
12	MF	(Armenia)	11	David Manoyan	1	0	0	0	1
12	DF	(Ivory Coast)	24	Dimitri Legbo	0	1	0	0	1
12	DF	(Armenia)	2	Robert Hakobyan	1	0	0	0	1
12	DF	(Serbia)	29	Marko Prljević	1	0	0	0	1
				TOTALS	47	2	0	8	57

=== Clean sheets ===
Place	Position	Nation	Number	Name	Premier League	Armenian Cup	Supercup	UEFA Europa Conference League	Total
1	GK	(Russia)	45	Vsevolod Yermakov	9	1	0	1	11
				TOTALS	9	1	0	1	11

=== Disciplinary record ===
Number	Nation	Position	Name	Premier League		Armenian Cup		Supercup		UEFA Europa Conference League		Total	
Number	Nation	Position	Name	Yellow card	Red card	Yellow card	Red card	Yellow card	Red card	Yellow card	Red card	Yellow card	Red card
2	(Armenia)	DF	Robert Hakobyan	1	0	0	0	0	0	1	0	2	0
5	(Armenia)	DF	Hrayr Mkoyan	4	0	2	0	1	0	1	0	8	0
7	(Nigeria)	MF	Isah Aliyu	5	1	0	0	0	0	0	0	5	1
9	(Armenia)	FW	Razmik Hakobyan	2	0	0	0	0	0	0	0	2	0
11	(Armenia)	MF	David Manoyan	4	0	0	0	0	0	1	0	5	0
18	(Armenia)	MF	Edgar Malakyan	1	0	1	0	0	0	1	0	3	0
20	(Armenia)	MF	Rudik Mkrtchyan	3	0	1	0	0	0	0	0	4	0
22	(Serbia)	MF	Igor Stanojević	1	0	0	0	0	0	0	0	1	0
23	(Armenia)	MF	Gor Malakyan	6	0	1	0	0	0	0	0	7	0
24	(Ivory Coast)	DF	Dimitri Legbo	2	0	0	0	0	0	0	0	2	0
25	(Ivory Coast)	MF	Armand Dagrou	1	0	0	0	0	0	0	0	1	0
26	(Armenia)	MF	Alik Arakelyan	1	0	0	0	0	0	0	0	1	0
27	(Argentina)	MF	Iván Díaz	2	0	1	0	0	0	0	0	3	0
29	(Serbia)	DF	Marko Prljević	3	0	0	0	0	0	0	0	3	0
33	(Armenia)	DF	Hovhannes Nazaryan	4	1	0	0	0	0	0	0	4	1
44	(Colombia)	DF	Juan Bravo	5	0	0	0	0	0	1	0	6	0
99	(Armenia)	DF	Robert Darbinyan	2	1	0	0	0	0	0	0	2	1
Players away on loan:
Players who left Ararat Yerevan during the season:
8	(Armenia)	DF	Zhirayr Margaryan	0	0	0	0	0	0	1	0	1	0
10	(Ivory Coast)	FW	Serges Déblé	0	1	0	0	0	0	1	0	1	1
17	(Ivory Coast)	FW	Yacouba Silue	2	0	0	0	0	0	1	0	3	0
55	(Serbia)	MF	Dimitrije Pobulić	0	0	0	0	0	0	2	0	2	0
98	(Ivory Coast)	FW	Mory Kone	0	0	0	0	0	0	2	0	2	0
			TOTALS	48	4	6	0	1	0	12	0	67	4
