= 2021–22 Noravank SC season =

Noravank
2021-22 season
- Manager: Vahe Gevorgyan
- Stadium: Charentsavan City Stadium
- Premier League: 7th
- Armenian Cup: Champions
- Top goalscorer: League: Shuaibu Ibrahim (10); All: Shuaibu Ibrahim (10)

The 2020–21 season was Noravank's first season in the Armenian Premier League.

== Season events ==
On 25 July, Noravank announced the signing of Julius Ufuoma from Pyunik, Erik Petrosyan from Sevan, Davit Minasyan from Alashkert, and Arman Mkrtchyan from Noah.

The next day, 26 July, Igor Zonjić signed for Noravank from Napredak Kruševac, and Ebert joined from Metalist Kharkiv.

On 28 July, Noravank announced the signing of Mikhail Bashilov from Energetik-BGU Minsk.

On 6 August, Noravank announced the signing of Temur Mustafin from Chernomorets Novorossiysk.

On 10 August, Noravank announced the signing of Vladislav Yarukov from Dynamo-2 Moscow.

On 18 August, Noravank announced the signing of Dusan Cubrakovic from Zlatibor Čajetina.

On 10 September, Noravank announced the signing of Artur Sokhiyev from Rostov.

On the final day of the transfer window, 14 September, Noravank announced the signing of Sunday Ingbede, who'd been a free agent after leaving Alashkert at the end of the previous season.

On 25 December, Benjamin Techie, Christian Boateng and Gideon Boateng all had their loan deals with Noravank ended early by mutual consent. The following day, 26 December, Dusan Cubrakovic and Igor Zonjić both left Noravank after their contracts where ended by mutual consent.

On 18 January, Artur Sokhiyev left Noravank by mutual consent.

On 28 January, Noravank announced the signing of Artur Avagyan and, who'd previously played for Sevan, and free agent Henri Avagyan.

On 8 February, Noravank announced the signing of free agent Yevgeni Kobzar.

On 13 February, Noravank announced the singing of Shuaibu Ibrahim from Jerv.

On 16 February, Noravank announced the singing of Tenton Yenne from MŠK Žilina.

On 19 February, Noravank announced the singing of Timur Rudoselsky, who'd previously played for Sevan.

On 8 March, Noravank announced the singing of Moses Candidus from Fremad Amager.

== Squad ==
As of match played 28 May 2022

Number	Name	Nationality	Position	Date of birth (age)	Signed from	Signed in	Contract ends	Apps.	Goals
Goalkeepers
1	Henri Avagyan	(Armenia)	GK	16 January 1996 (age 30)	Unattached	2022		18	0
12	Daniil Yarusov	(Russia)	GK	25 January 2001 (age 25)	Olimp-Dolgoprudny-2	2022		1	0
31	Narek Voskanyan	(Armenia)	GK	29 January 2000 (age 26)	Unattached	2021			
Defenders
3	Gagik Maghakyan	(Armenia)	DF	7 February 1996 (age 30)	Sevan	2020			
4	Mikhail Bashilov	(Russia)	DF	12 January 1993 (age 33)	Energetik-BGU Minsk	2021		34	1
5	Norayr Nikoghosyan	(Armenia)	DF	9 March 2002 (age 24)	Sevan	2020			
11	Arman Asilyan	(Armenia)	DF	15 April 1999 (age 27)	Lori	2021			
14	Arman Khachatryan	(Armenia)	DF	9 June 1997 (age 29)	Van	2021			
20	Simon Obonde	(Ghana)	DF	10 May 2001 (age 25)	loan from Cheetah	2020			
21	Artur Avagyan	(Armenia)	DF	4 July 1987 (age 39)	Unattached	2022		12	0
22	Timur Rudoselsky	(Kazakhstan)	DF	21 December 1994 (age 31)	Unattached	2022		15	3
25	Ebert	(Brazil)	DF	25 May 1993 (age 33)	Metalist Kharkiv	2021		30	1
63	Temur Mustafin	(Russia)	DF	15 April 1995 (age 31)	Chernomorets Novorossiysk	2021		32	3
99	Arman Mkrtchyan	(Armenia)	DF	9 July 1999 (age 27)	Noah	2021		26	0
Midfielders
6	Moses Candidus	(Nigeria)	MF	11 July 2002 (age 24)	Fremad Amager	2022		10	0
7	Andranik Kocharyan	(Armenia)	MF	29 January 1994 (age 32)	Gandzasar Kapan	2021			
8	Julius Ufuoma	(Nigeria)	MF	14 February 2000 (age 26)	Pyunik	2021		33	0
10	Karen Nalbandyan	(Armenia)	MF	14 April 2002 (age 24)	Vista Gelendzhik	2020			
18	Babou Cham	(The Gambia)	MF	3 March 1999 (age 27)	Unattached	2022		19	3
77	Davit Minasyan	(Armenia)	MF	9 March 1993 (age 33)	Alashkert	2021		16	1
88	Aram Kocharyan	(Armenia)	MF	5 March 1996 (age 30)	Unattached	2022		16	0
Forwards
9	Yevgeni Kobzar	(Russia)	FW	9 August 1992 (age 34)	Unattached	2022		16	2
15	Tenton Yenne	(Nigeria)	FW	7 July 2000 (age 26)	MŠK Žilina	2022		18	4
17	Shuaibu Ibrahim	(Nigeria)	FW	19 December 1996 (age 29)	Jerv	2022		19	10
26	Sunday Ingbede	(Nigeria)	FW	23 April 1998 (age 28)	Unattached	2021		9	0
37	Sergei Orlov	(Russia)	FW	20 April 1989 (age 37)	West Armenia	2021		26	7
Players away on loan
Players who left during the season
6	David Margaryan	(Armenia)	MF	14 December 1997 (age 28)	Lokomotiv Yerevan	2020			
9	Benjamin Techie	(Ghana)	FW	10 December 1998 (age 27)	loan from Cheetah	2020			
15	David Quaye	(Ghana)	MF	9 September 1998 (age 28)	loan from Cheetah	2020			
16	Vladislav Yarukov	(Russia)	GK	9 September 1998 (age 28)	Dynamo-2 Moscow	2021		0	0
19	Christian Boateng	(Ghana)	MF	9 September 1998 (age 28)	loan from Cheetah	2020			
22	Gideon Boateng	(Ghana)	FW	6 May 2002 (age 24)	loan from Cheetah	2020			
24	Igor Zonjić	(Montenegro)	DF	16 October 1991 (age 35)	Napredak Kruševac	2021		16	0
31	Daniil Polyanski	(Russia)	GK	18 February 2001 (age 25)	Volna Kovernino	2020			
35	Dusan Cubrakovic	(Serbia)	GK	21 July 1995 (age 31)	Zlatibor Čajetina	2021		8	0
66	Erik Petrosyan	(Armenia)	FW	19 February 1998 (age 28)	Van	2021		9	0
95	Artur Sokhiyev	(Russia)	FW	27 September 2002 (age 24)	Rostov	2021		8	1

== Transfers ==
=== In ===
Date	Position	Nationality	Name	From	Fee	Ref.
25 July 2021	DF	(Armenia)	Arman Mkrtchyan	Noah	Undisclosed	
25 July 2021	MF	(Armenia)	Davit Minasyan	Alashkert	Undisclosed	
25 July 2021	MF	(Nigeria)	Julius Ufuoma	Pyunik	Undisclosed	
25 July 2021	FW	(Armenia)	Erik Petrosyan	Sevan	Undisclosed	
26 July 2021	DF	(Brazil)	Ebert	Metalist Kharkiv	Undisclosed	
26 July 2021	DF	(Montenegro)	Igor Zonjić	Napredak Kruševac	Undisclosed	
28 July 2021	DF	(Russia)	Mikhail Bashilov	Energetik-BGU Minsk	Undisclosed	
6 August 2021	DF	(Russia)	Temur Mustafin	Chernomorets Novorossiysk	Undisclosed	
10 August 2021	GK	(Russia)	Vladislav Yarukov	Dynamo-2 Moscow	Undisclosed	
18 August 2021	GK	(Serbia)	Dusan Cubrakovic	Zlatibor Čajetina	Undisclosed	
10 September 2021	FW	(Russia)	Artur Sokhiyev	Rostov	Undisclosed	
14 September 2021	FW	(Nigeria)	Sunday Ingbede	Unattached	Free	
28 January 2022	GK	(Armenia)	Henri Avagyan	Unattached	Free	
28 January 2022	DF	(Armenia)	Artur Avagyan	Unattached	Free	
28 January 2022	MF	(Armenia)	Aram Kocharyan	Unattached	Free	
28 January 2022	MF	(The Gambia)	Babou Cham	Unattached	Free	
8 February 2022	FW	(Russia)	Yevgeni Kobzar	Unattached	Free	
13 February 2022	FW	(Nigeria)	Shuaibu Ibrahim	Unattached	Free	
16 February 2022	FW	(Nigeria)	Tenton Yenne	MŠK Žilina	Undisclosed	
19 February 2022	DF	(Kazakhstan)	Timur Rudoselsky	Unattached	Free	
8 March 2022	MF	(Nigeria)	Moses Candidus	Fremad Amager	Undisclosed	

=== Loans in ===
Date from	Position	Nationality	Name	From	Date to	Ref.
24 October 2020	MF	(Ghana)	Christian Boateng	Cheetah	25 December 2021	
24 October 2020	MF	(Ghana)	David Quaye	Cheetah	25 December 2021	
24 October 2020	FW	(Ghana)	Gideon Boateng	Cheetah	25 December 2021	
24 October 2020	FW	(Ghana)	Benjamin Techie	Cheetah	25 December 2021	

=== Released ===
Date	Position	Nationality	Name	Joined	Date	Ref.
26 December 2021	GK	(Serbia)	Dusan Cubrakovic			
26 December 2021	DF	(Montenegro)	Igor Zonjić	Foresta Suceava		
27 December 2021	GK	(Russia)	Vladislav Yarukov	SKA-Khabarovsk		
29 December 2021	MF	(Armenia)	David Margaryan			
31 December 2021	GK	(Russia)	Daniil Polyanski	Chita		
18 January 2022	FW	(Russia)	Artur Sokhiyev	Dynamo Stavropol		
27 January 2022	FW	(Armenia)	Erik Petrosyan	Kaganat		
2 June 2022	MF	(The Gambia)	Babou Cham	Ararat Yerevan	2 June 2022	
7 June 2022	MF	(Armenia)	Davit Minasyan			
7 June 2022	MF	(Armenia)	Andranik Kocharyan			

== Friendlies ==
29 January 2022	Noah	1–1	Noravank	Vagharshapat
13:00 (UTC+4)	Marky 28'	Report	Bashilov 65'	Stadium: Etchmiadzin Academy Stadium

9 February 2022	Noah	1–1	Noravank	Vagharshapat
(UTC+4)	C.Ikechukwu 22'	Report	B.Cham 38'	Stadium: Etchmiadzin Academy Stadium

12 February 2022	Noravank	2–2	Ararat Yerevan	Charentsavan
12:00 (UTC+4)	B.Cham; Trialist	Report	Goal	Stadium: Charentsavan City Stadium

== Competitions ==
=== Overall record ===
Competition	First match	Last match	Starting round	Final position	Record							
Competition	First match	Last match	Starting round	Final position	Pld	W	D	L	GF	GA	GD	Win %
Premier League	30 July 2021	28 May 2022	Matchday 1	7th	32	7	7	18	36	55	−19	21.88
Armenian Cup	15 September 2021	8 May 2022	First round	Winners	4	4	0	0	7	2	+5	100.00
Total					36	11	7	18	43	57	−14	30.56

Last updated: 28 May 2022
Source: Competitions

=== Premier League ===
==== Results summary ====
Overall								Home						Away					
Pld	W	D	L	GF	GA	GD	Pts	W	D	L	GF	GA	GD	W	D	L	GF	GA	GD
32	7	7	18	37	56	−19	28	6	4	6	24	22	+2	1	3	12	13	34	−21

Last updated: 28 May 2022.
Source: See Results

==== Results by round ====
Round	1	2	3	4	5	6	7	8	9	10	11	12	13	14	15	16	17	18	19	20	21	22	23	24	25	26	27	28	29	30	31	32	33	34	35	36
Ground	A	H	A	H	A	H	A	H	A	H	A	H	A	H	A	H (Note: Between matchday 15 and 16, Sevan were expelled from the league.)	A	H	A	H	A	H	H	H	A	H	A	H	A	H	A	A	A	H	A	H
Result	L	W	V	L	L	D	D	W	L	L	L	V	L	D	L	L	L	D	D	L	P	L	L	W	L	W	W	W	L	V	L	L	D	D	L	W
Position	7	6	7	7	7	7	8	7	7	8	9	9	9	8	7	7	8	8	8	8	8	8	8	8	8	8	7	7	7	7	7	7	7	7	7	7

Updated to match(es) played on 28 May 2022. Source: See Results
A = Away; H = Home; W = Win; D = Draw; L = Loss; P = Postponed; V = Void

==== Results ====
1 August 2021 1	Urartu	3–0	Noravank	Yerevan
20:00 (UTC+4)	N.Grigoryan 48'; U.Iwu 67'; Melkonyan 86'	Report	Bashilov (yellow card) 82'; D.Quaye (yellow card) 90+1'	Stadium: Urartu Stadium; Attendance: 700; Referee: Artur Safaryan

6 August 2021 2	Noravank	2–1	Pyunik	Charentsavan
17:00 (UTC+4)	B.Techie 26' (yellow card) 45+3'; K.Nalbandyan (yellow card) 67'; D.Quaye (yellow card) 86'; S.Obonde (yellow card) 87' (goal) 90+2'	Report	Harutyunyan 45+9'	Stadium: Charentsavan City Stadium; Attendance: 500; Referee: Ashot Ghaltakchyan
Note: Match played at the Charentsavan City Stadium in Charentsavan, instead of Noravank's regular Arevik Stadium in Vayk due to renovation work.

13 August 2021 3	Sevan	v	Noravank	Yerevan
17:00 (UTC+4)	Duranski (yellow card) 41'; Claudir (yellow card) 57'; A.Mensalão 89' (yellow card) 89'; D.Figueiredo (yellow card) 90'	Report	J.Ufuoma (yellow card) 21'; Ebert (yellow card) 48'; Zonjić (yellow card) 69'	Stadium: Alashkert Stadium; Attendance: 200; Referee: Henrik Nalbandyan
Note: Match declared void on 1 December 2021.

20 August 2021 4	Noravank	0–2	Ararat-Armenia	Charentsavan
17:00 (UTC+4)	J.Ufuoma (yellow card) 32'; Mustafin (yellow card) 76'	Report	Eza 23', 53'; Lima (yellow card) 32'; Khachumyan (yellow card) 70'	Stadium: Charentsavan City Stadium; Attendance: 250; Referee: Artem Gasparyan

24 August 2021 5	Ararat Yerevan	3–2	Noravank	Gyumri
16:00 (UTC+4)	Arakelyan 3'; Déblé 32', 83'	Report	Bashilov (yellow card) 51'; Zonjić (yellow card) 59'; Ebert 83' (yellow card) 86'; A.Mkrtchyan 90'	Stadium: City Stadium; Attendance: 200; Referee: Vardan Manukyan
Note: Match played at the City Stadium, in Gyumri instead of Ararat Yerevan's regular Republican Stadium in Yerevan.

11 September 2021 6	Noravank	1–2	Noah	Charentsavan
16:00 (UTC+4)	S.Obonde (yellow card) 68'; D.Minasyan 77'; Ebert (yellow card) 90'	Report	Mayrovich 90'	Stadium: Charentsavan City Stadium; Attendance: 200; Referee: Zaven Hovhannisyan

20 September 2021 7	Alashkert	0–0	Noravank	Yerevan
16:00 (UTC+4)	Embaló (yellow card) 71'; Jovanović (yellow card) 75'	Report	Zonjić (yellow card) 71'; D.Cubrakovic (yellow card) 90+3'	Stadium: Alashkert Stadium; Attendance: 500; Referee: Ashot Ghaltakchyan

28 September 2021 8	Noravank	1–0	Van	Charentsavan
16:00 (UTC+4)	Orlov 23'; A.Asilyan (yellow card) 86'; K.Nalbandyan (yellow card) 88'; A.Mkrtchyan (yellow card) 90'	Report	E.Essien (yellow card) 56'; Stepanov (yellow card) 57'; Daghbashyan (yellow card) 77'	Stadium: Charentsavan City Stadium; Attendance: 500; Referee: Artur Safaryan

17 October 2021 9	BKMA Yerevan	2–0	Noravank	Yerevan
19:00 (UTC+4)	D.Aghbalyan 14'; S.Obonde 67' (o.g.); V.Samsonyan (yellow card) 75'	Report	Ebert (yellow card) 47'; Mustafin (yellow card) 64'	Stadium: Republican Stadium; Attendance: 200; Referee: Vardan Manukyan

21 October 2021 10	Noravank	0–1	Urartu	Charentsavan
15:00 (UTC+4)	Ingbede (yellow card) 36'; Zonjić (yellow card) 90'; Mustafin (red card) 90'	Report	N.Grigoryan 20'; K.Ayvazyan (yellow card) 36'; U.Iwu (yellow card) 40'	Stadium: Charentsavan City Stadium; Referee: Vardan Manukyan

27 October 2021 11	Pyunik	2–0	Noravank	Yerevan
19:00 (UTC+4)	D.Cubrakovic 12' (o.g.); Firmino (yellow card) 50' (goal) 60'	Report	J.Ufuoma (yellow card) 48'	Stadium: Republican Stadium; Attendance: 800; Referee: Shahen Aghayan

1 November 2021 12	Noravank	v	Sevan	Charentsavan
15:00 (UTC+4)	D.Minasyan (yellow card) 18'; A.Khachatryan (yellow card) 46'; A.Kocharyan (yellow card) 70'; Bashilov (yellow card) 90+4'	Report	Bissainthe (yellow card) 22' (goal) 90+1'; A.Avagyan (yellow card) 42'; Aleksić (yellow card) 69'; Luiz Matheus (red card) 90+6'	Stadium: Charentsavan City Stadium; Attendance: 30; Referee: Artem Gasparyan
Note: Match declared void on 1 December 2021.

6 November 2021 13	Ararat-Armenia	2–1	Noravank	Yerevan
16:00 (UTC+4)	Avanesyan 24'; Lima (yellow card) 28'; Muradyan (yellow card) 34'; Eza 54'	Report	Orlov (yellow card) 10' (goal) 48'; J.Ufuoma (yellow card) 13'; Ebert (yellow card) 67'	Stadium: FFA Academy Stadium; Attendance: 350; Referee: Sargis Khachatryan

18 November 2021 14	Noravank	1–1	Ararat Yerevan	Charentsavan
14:00 (UTC+4)	Orlov (yellow card) 34'; Mustafin (yellow card) 61' (goal) 67'; A.Khachatryan (yellow card) 78'	Report	Déblé 11'; Y.Silue (yellow card) 86'	Stadium: Charentsavan City Stadium; Attendance: 50; Referee: Vardan Manukyan

1 December 2021 15	Noah	2–1	Noravank	Yerevan
16:00 (UTC+4)	Gabarayev (yellow card) 9'; S.Gomes (yellow card) 26'; Kireyenko 32'; C.Ikechukwu (yellow card) 52'; Avetisyan 70' (pen.)	Report	Orlov 9' (pen.) (yellow card) 90+2'; Polyanski (yellow card) 53'	Stadium: FFA Academy Stadium; Attendance: 250; Referee: Henrik Nalbandyan

4 December 2021 16	Noravank	0–2	Alashkert	Charentsavan
14:00 (UTC+4)	D.Quaye (yellow card) 70'	Report	Fofana 24'; Yedigaryan 84'	Stadium: Charentsavan City Stadium; Attendance: 50; Referee: Shahen Aghayan

10 December 2021 17	Van	2–0	Noravank	Charentsavan
14:00 (UTC+4)	Daghbashyan (yellow card) 8'; J.Gaba 78', 79'	Report	Ebert (yellow card) 24'; Mustafin (yellow card) 63'	Stadium: Charentsavan City Stadium; Referee: Zaven Hovhannisyan

20 February 2022 18	Noravank	1–1	BKMA Yerevan	Vayk
14:00 (UTC+4)	Orlov 55' (pen.); Mustafin (yellow card) 76'; Yenne (yellow card) 79'	Report	A.Galstyan (yellow card) 30'; N.Alaverdyan (yellow card) 54'; Khachumyan (yellow card) 76'; A.Grigoryan (yellow card) 79'; S.Mkrtchyan 85'	Stadium: Arevik Stadium; Referee: Sargis Khachatryan

24 February 2022 19	Urartu	1–1	Noravank	Yerevan
16:00 (UTC+4)	N.Antwi (yellow card) 7' (yellow-red card) 87'; Désiré 17' (pen.)	Report	A.Avagyan (yellow card) 32' (yellow-red card) 90+1'; A.Khachatryan (yellow card) 47'; Ebert 74'; Rudoselsky (yellow card) 77'	Stadium: Urartu Stadium; Referee: Ashot Ghaltakchyan

2 March 2022 20	Noravank	1–2	Pyunik	Vayk
14:00 (UTC+4)	Bashilov (yellow card) 51'; Kobzar 62' (pen.); Mustafin (yellow card) 79'; H.Avagyan (yellow card) 86'	Report	Firmino 33', 89' (yellow card) 90'; Yurchenko (yellow card) 90+5'	Stadium: Arevik Stadium

5-6 March 2022 21	Sevan	BYE	Noravank	Yerevan
(UTC+4)				Stadium: Alashkert Stadium
Note: Sevan expelled from the league on 1 December 2021.

10 March 2022 22	Noravank	0–2	Ararat-Armenia	Charentsavan
15:00 (UTC+4)	Ebert (yellow card) 48'; Rudoselsky (yellow card) 81'; Bashilov (yellow card) 83'	Report	Sanogo 19'; Otubanjo 28'; Ambartsumyan (yellow card) 77'	Stadium: Charentsavan City Stadium; Referee: Shahen Aghayan

15 March 2022 23	Noravank	0–1	Ararat Yerevan	Charentsavan
15:00 (UTC+4)	A.Khachatryan (yellow card) 39'; Yenne (yellow card) 53'; Mustafin (yellow card) 77'	Report	R.Mkrtchyan 33'; Ra.Hakobyan (yellow card) 40'; J.Bravo (yellow card) 49'; Aliyu (yellow card) 81'	Stadium: Charentsavan City Stadium; Referee: Henrik Nalbandyan

19 March 2022 24	Noravank	3–1	Noah	Yerevan
15:00 (UTC+4)	Ibrahim 9', 27', 53'; A.Avagyan (yellow card) 37'; Bashilov (yellow card) 45+2'; A.Kocharyan (yellow card) 90+5'	Report	Harutyunyan 3'; Spătaru (yellow card) 50'; Monroy (yellow card) 90+5'	Stadium: FFA Academy Stadium; Referee: Henrik Nalbandyan

6 April 2022 25	Alashkert	3–0	Noravank	Yerevan
15:00 (UTC+4)	Mustafin 10' (o.g.); Gome (yellow card) 24' (yellow-red card) 38' (goal) 30'; V.Ayvazyan 53'	Report		Stadium: Alashkert Stadium; Referee: Zaven Hovhannisyan

12 April 2022 26	Noravank	7–1	Van	Yerevan
14:00 (UTC+4)	Ibrahim 2', 44'; A.Khachatryan 7'; Yenne 25', 90+2'; A.Avagyan (yellow card) 32'; Orlov 77', 80' (yellow card) 80'; K.Nalbandyan (yellow card) 83'	Report	B.Techie (yellow card) 33'; S.Gutiérrez (yellow card) 45+2'; E.Azizyan (yellow card) 47'; Clifford 66'; Adams (yellow card) 69'	Stadium: FFA Academy Stadium; Referee: Ashot Ghaltakchyan

16 April 2022 27	BKMA Yerevan	0–1	Noravank	Yerevan
18:00 (UTC+4)	E.Simonyan (yellow card) 32'; Ishkhanyan (yellow card) 77'	Report	Rudoselsky 10'; Yenne (yellow card) 90+1'	Stadium: Republican Stadium; Referee: Zaven Hovhannisyan

20 April 2022 28	Noravank	3–2	Urartu	Yerevan
15:00 (UTC+4)	Kobzar 51'; B.Cham 58', 84'	Report	U.Iwu 25'; Margaryan (yellow card) 41'; Miranyan 62'	Stadium: FFA Academy Stadium; Referee: Henrik Nalbandyan

25 April 2022 29	Pyunik	3–2	Noravank	Yerevan
19:00 (UTC+4)	Nenadović 46' (yellow card) 90+6'; Hovhannisyan (yellow card) 49'; Firmino 60'; Déblé 67'; González (yellow card) 79'	Report	Ar.Kocharyan (yellow card) 13'; Bashilov (yellow card) 15'; N.Nikoghosyan 42'; Yenne 80'	Stadium: Republican Stadium

28-30 April 2022 30	Noravank	BYE	Sevan	Yerevan
(UTC+4)				Stadium: FFA Academy Stadium
Note: Sevan expelled from the league on 1 December 2021.

3 May 2022 31	Ararat-Armenia	2–0	Noravank	Yerevan
19:30 (UTC+4)	J.Duarte 26'; Lima 71' (pen.) (yellow card) 89'	Report	H.Avagyan (yellow card) 69'; J.Ufuoma (yellow card) 87'	Stadium: FFA Academy Stadium; Referee: Artem Gasparyan

11 May 2022 32	Ararat Yerevan	4–0	Noravank	Yerevan
19:30 (UTC+4)	J.Bravo 45+3'; E.Malakyan 59', 63'; Aliyu 88'	Report	Orlov (yellow card) 13' (yellow-red card) 37'	Stadium: Republican Stadium; Referee: Artem Gasparyan

16 May 2022 33	Noah	3–3	Noravank	Armavir
16:00 (UTC+4)	A.Oliveira (yellow card) 26'; Mayrovich 31', 48'; Trufanov (yellow card) 64'; V.Shahatuni (yellow card) 65'; Harutyunyan 80'; Gomes (yellow card) 90'; Monroy (yellow card) 90+3'	Report	A.Khachatryan (yellow card) 8'; K.Nalbandyan 15'; Rudoselsky 22' (yellow card) 90'; Ibrahim 29'; A.Avagyan (yellow card) 54'; N.Nikoghosyan (yellow card) 65'; J.Ufuoma (yellow card) 88'	Stadium: Armavir City Stadium; Referee: Shahen Aghayan

22 May 2022 34	Noravank	1–1	Alashkert	Yerevan
16:45 (UTC+4)	Rudoselsky (yellow card) 41'; A.Mkrtchyan (yellow card) 61'; Ibrahim 81'	Report	Milinković 74'	Stadium: FFA Academy Stadium; Referee: Zaven Hovhannisyan

25 May 2022 35	Van	2–1	Noravank	Charentsavan
14:00 (UTC+4)	K.Kakhabrishvili 19', 30'; Gvazava (yellow card) 58'; Clifford (yellow card) 83'; A.Malkanduev (yellow card) 90+4'	Report	Ibrahim 69'; H.Avagyan (yellow card) 83'; H.Avagyan (yellow card) 90+1'	Stadium: Charentsavan City Stadium; Referee: Davit Mkrtchyan

28 May 2022 36	Noravank	3–2	BKMA Yerevan	Yerevan
15:00 (UTC+4)	B.Cham 18'; Ibrahim 52', 65' (pen.)	Report	A.Stepanyan 5'; M.Grigoryan 39'	Stadium: FFA Academy Stadium; Referee: Yura Mahtesyan

==== Table ====
Pos	Team	Pld	W	D	L	GF	GA	GD	Pts	Qualification or relegation
1	Pyunik (C)	32	23	6	3	52	25	+27	75	Qualification for the Champions League first qualifying round
2	Ararat-Armenia	32	23	5	4	56	20	+36	74	Qualification for the Europa Conference League second qualifying round (Note: The 2021–22 Armenian Cup winners, Noravank, did not obtain an UEFA license and was replaced.)
3	Alashkert	32	14	9	9	38	30	+8	51	Qualification for the Europa Conference League first qualifying round
4	Ararat Yerevan	32	13	7	12	47	36	+11	46	Qualification for the Europa Conference League first qualifying round
5	Urartu	32	9	13	10	37	32	+5	40	
6	Noah	32	9	12	11	38	43	−5	39	
7	Noravank	32	7	7	18	36	55	−19	28	
8	Van	32	6	7	19	19	47	−28	25	
9	BKMA (O)	32	4	6	22	25	60	−35	18	Qualification to the relegation play-offs
10	Sevan (D, R)	0	0	0	0	0	0	0	0	Relegation to the Armenian First League (Note: Sevan was expelled from the league on 1 December 2021.)

Source: FFA Soccerway
Rules for classification: 1) Points; 2) Head-to-head points; 3) Head-to-head goal difference; 4) Head-to-head goals scored; 5) Matches won; 6) Goal difference; 7) Less red cards; 8) Less yellow cards; 9) Fair-play ranking 10) Draw
(C) Champions; (D) Disqualified; (O) Play-off winners; (R) Relegated

=== Armenian Cup ===
15 September 2021 First Round	Shirak	0–1	Noravank	Gyumri
15:30 (UTC+4)	D.Ghandilyan (yellow card) 22'; S.Urushanyan (yellow card) 42'; V.Torosyan (yellow card) 90+7'	Report	Sokhiyev 74'; D.Minasyan (yellow card) 90+6'	Stadium: Gyumri City Stadium; Attendance: 60; Referee: Zaven Hovhannisyan

24 November 2021 Quarterfinal	Noravank	2–1	Ararat-Armenia	Charentsavan
14:00 (UTC+4)	Mustafin 28'; Ebert (yellow card) 46'; Orlov 69' (yellow card) 90'; Polyanski (yellow card) 88'	Report	Klymenchuk (yellow card) 17'; Otubanjo 71'; Ambartsumyan (yellow card) 88'; Terteryan (yellow card) 90'	Stadium: Charentsavan City Stadium; Attendance: 100; Referee: Ashot Ghaltakchyan

2 April 2022 Semifinal	Ararat Yerevan	1–2	Noravank	Yerevan
18:00 (UTC+4)	R.Mkrtchyan (yellow card) 17'; C.Ouguehi 46'; Mkoyan (yellow card) 90+3'	Report	Rudoselsky 2'; A.Khachatryan (yellow card) 8' (yellow-red card) 35'; A.Avagyan (yellow card) 53'; Mustafin (yellow card) 63'; Bashilov 68'; A.Mkrtchyan (yellow card) 90+2'	Stadium: Republican Stadium; Referee: Henrik Nalbandyan

==== Final ====
8 May 2022	Noravank	2–0	Urartu	Yerevan
19:00 (UTC+4)	Mustafin 28' (yellow card) 88'; A.Avagyan (yellow card) 45+2'; Yenne 77'	Report		Stadium: Republican Stadium; Referee: Zaven Hovhannisyan

== Statistics ==
As of match played 28 May 2022

=== Appearances and goals ===
No.	Pos	Nat	Player	Total		Premier League		Armenian Cup	
No.	Pos	Nat	Player	Apps	Goals	Apps	Goals	Apps	Goals
1	GK	(Armenia) ARM	Henri Avagyan	18	0	16	0	2	0
4	DF	(Russia) RUS	Mikhail Bashilov	34	1	27+3	0	3+1	1
5	DF	(Armenia) ARM	Norayr Nikoghosyan	26	1	14+9	1	2+1	0
6	MF	(Nigeria) NGR	Moses Candidus	10	0	4+5	0	0+1	0
7	MF	(Armenia) ARM	Andranik Kocharyan	24	0	15+6	0	2+1	0
8	MF	(Nigeria) NGR	Julius Ufuoma	33	0	23+6	0	2+2	0
9	FW	(Russia) RUS	Yevgeni Kobzar	16	2	15	2	1	0
10	MF	(Armenia) ARM	Karen Nalbandyan	25	1	13+10	1	1+1	0
11	DF	(Armenia) ARM	Arman Asilyan	13	0	4+7	0	0+2	0
12	GK	(Russia) RUS	Daniil Yarusov	1	0	1	0	0	0
14	DF	(Armenia) ARM	Arman Khachatryan	27	1	19+5	1	2+1	0
15	FW	(Nigeria) NGR	Tenton Yenne	18	4	8+8	3	2	1
17	FW	(Nigeria) NGR	Shuaibu Ibrahim	19	10	13+4	10	2	0
18	MF	(The Gambia) GAM	Babou Cham	19	3	14+3	3	2	0
20	DF	(Ghana) GHA	Simon Obonde	10	0	7+2	0	1	0
21	DF	(Armenia) ARM	Artur Avagyan	12	0	10	0	2	0
22	DF	(Kazakhstan) KAZ	Timur Rudoselsky	15	3	13	2	2	1
25	DF	(Brazil) BRA	Ebert	30	2	24+2	2	4	0
26	FW	(Nigeria) NGR	Sunday Ingbede	9	0	7+1	0	1	0
37	FW	(Russia) RUS	Sergei Orlov	26	7	16+8	6	2	1
63	DF	(Russia) RUS	Temur Mustafin	33	3	27+2	1	4	2
77	MF	(Armenia) ARM	Davit Minasyan	16	1	9+5	1	1+1	0
88	MF	(Armenia) ARM	Aram Kocharyan	16	0	8+6	0	2	0
99	DF	(Armenia) ARM	Arman Mkrtchyan	26	1	9+14	1	1+2	0
Players away on loan:
Players who left Noravank during the season:
9	FW	(Ghana) GHA	Benjamin Techie	3	1	1+2	1	0	0
15	MF	(Ghana) GHA	David Quaye	5	1	1+3	1	0+1	0
19	MF	(Ghana) GHA	Christian Boateng	3	0	0+3	0	0	0
24	DF	(Montenegro) MNE	Igor Zonjić	16	0	15	0	1	0
31	GK	(Russia) RUS	Daniil Polyanski	10	0	8+1	0	1	0
35	GK	(Serbia) SRB	Dusan Cubrakovic	8	0	7	0	1	0
66	FW	(Armenia) ARM	Erik Petrosyan	8	0	2+6	0	0	0
95	FW	(Russia) RUS	Artur Sokhiyev	8	1	0+7	0	0+1	1

=== Goal scorers ===
Place	Position	Nation	Number	Name	Premier League	Armenian Cup	Total
1	FW	(Nigeria)	17	Shuaibu Ibrahim	10	0	10
1	FW	(Russia)	37	Sergei Orlov	6	1	7
3	FW	(Nigeria)	15	Tenton Yenne	3	1	4
4	MF	(The Gambia)	18	Babou Cham	3	0	3
4	DF	(Kazakhstan)	22	Timur Rudoselsky	2	1	3
4	DF	(Russia)	63	Temur Mustafin	1	2	3
7	DF	(Brazil)	25	Ebert	2	0	2
7	FW	(Russia)	9	Yevgeni Kobzar	2	0	2
9	FW	(Ghana)	9	Benjamin Techie	1	0	1
9	DF	(Ghana)	20	Simon Obonde	1	0	1
9	DF	(Armenia)	99	Arman Mkrtchyan	1	0	1
9	MF	(Armenia)	77	Davit Minasyan	1	0	1
9	DF	(Armenia)	14	Arman Khachatryan	1	0	1
9	DF	(Armenia)	5	Norayr Nikoghosyan	1	0	1
9	MF	(Armenia)	10	Karen Nalbandyan	1	0	1
9	FW	(Russia)	95	Artur Sokhiyev	0	1	1
9	DF	(Russia)	4	Mikhail Bashilov	0	1	1
				TOTALS	36	7	43

=== Clean sheets ===
Place	Position	Nation	Number	Name	Premier League	Armenian Cup	Total
1	GK	(Serbia)	35	Dusan Cubrakovic	2	1	3
2	GK	(Armenia)	1	Henri Avagyan	1	1	2
				TOTALS	3	2	5

=== Disciplinary record ===
Number	Nation	Position	Name	Premier League		Armenian Cup		Total	
Number	Nation	Position	Name	Yellow card	Red card	Yellow card	Red card	Yellow card	Red card
1	(Armenia)	GK	Henri Avagyan	3	0	0	0	3	0
4	(Russia)	DF	Mikhail Bashilov	6	0	0	0	6	0
5	(Armenia)	DF	Norayr Nikoghosyan	1	0	0	0	1	0
8	(Nigeria)	MF	Julius Ufuoma	5	0	0	0	5	0
10	(Armenia)	MF	Karen Nalbandyan	3	0	0	0	3	0
11	(Armenia)	DF	Arman Asilyan	1	0	0	0	1	0
14	(Armenia)	DF	Arman Khachatryan	4	0	2	1	6	1
15	(Nigeria)	FW	Tenton Yenne	3	0	0	0	3	0
20	(Ghana)	DF	Simon Obonde	2	0	0	0	2	0
21	(Armenia)	DF	Artur Avagyan	6	1	2	0	8	1
22	(Kazakhstan)	DF	Timur Rudoselsky	4	0	0	0	4	0
25	(Brazil)	DF	Ebert	6	0	1	0	7	0
26	(Nigeria)	FW	Sunday Ingbede	1	0	0	0	1	0
37	(Russia)	FW	Sergei Orlov	6	1	1	0	7	1
63	(Russia)	DF	Temur Mustafin	7	1	2	0	9	1
77	(Armenia)	MF	Davit Minasyan	0	0	1	0	1	0
88	(Armenia)	MF	Aram Kocharyan	2	0	0	0	2	0
99	(Armenia)	DF	Arman Mkrtchyan	2	0	1	0	3	0
			Unknown	1	0	0	0	1	0
Players away on loan:
Players who left Noravank during the season:
9	(Ghana)	FW	Benjamin Techie	1	0	0	0	1	0
15	(Ghana)	MF	David Quaye	3	0	0	0	3	0
24	(Montenegro)	DF	Igor Zonjić	3	0	0	0	3	0
31	(Russia)	GK	Daniil Polyanski	1	0	1	0	2	0
35	(Serbia)	GK	Dusan Cubrakovic	1	0	0	0	1	0
			TOTALS	70	3	11	1	81	3
