= 2020–21 Armenian First League =

Armenian First League
- Season: 2020–21
- Dates: 14 August 2020 – 30 May 2021
- All statistics correct as of 22:10, 31 May 2021 (UTC).

The 2020–21 Armenian First League season is the 29th since its establishment. The season was launched on 14 August 2020 and will conclude on 29 May 2021.

== Stadiums and locations ==
Locations of the 2020–21 Armenian First League teams

Club	Location	Stadium	Capacity
Ararat-2	Yerevan	Dzoraghbyur Training Centre	n/a
Ararat-Armenia-2	Yerevan	Yerevan Football Academy	n/a
BKMA	Yerevan	Vagharshapat Football Academy	300
Lernayin Artsakh	Sisian	Sisian City Stadium	500
Noravank	Vayk	Arevik Stadium	n/a
Pyunik-2	Yerevan	Pyunik Stadium	780
Sevan	Sevan	Sevan City Stadium	500
Shirak-2	Gyumri	Gyumri City Stadium	2,844
Urartu-2	Yerevan	Urartu Training Centre	500
West Armenia	Yerevan	Dzoraghbyur Training Centre	n/a

== League table ==
Pos	Team	Pld	W	D	L	GF	GA	GD	Pts	Promotion
1	Sevan	27	22	2	3	75	23	+52	68	Promotion to the 2021-22 Armenian Premier League
2	BKMA	27	21	2	4	84	22	+62	65	Promotion to the 2021-22 Armenian Premier League
3	Noravank	27	16	2	9	45	31	+14	50	Promotion to the 2021-22 Armenian Premier League
4	West Armenia	27	16	2	9	71	36	+35	50	
5	Lernayin Artsakh	27	12	2	13	37	50	−13	38	
6	Urartu-2	27	10	5	12	43	53	−10	35	
7	Ararat-2	27	10	2	15	44	56	−12	32	
8	Pyunik-2	27	6	2	19	25	72	−47	20	
9	Shirak-2	27	5	2	20	21	68	−47	17	
10	Ararat-Armenia-2	27	4	5	18	28	62	−34	17	

Updated to match(es) played on 30 May 2021. Source:
Rules for classification: 1) Points; 2) Play-off (only if deciding champion); 3) Matches won; 4) Head-to-head points; 5) Head-to-head matches won; 6) Head-to-head goal difference; 7) Head-to-head goals scored; 8) Head-to-head away goals scored; 9) Goal difference; 10) Goals scored.

== Statistics ==
=== Top scorers ===
As of 31 May 2021.

Rank	Player	Club	Goals
1	(Armenia) Zhirayr Shaghoyan	BKMA	28
2	(Russia) Sergei Orlov	West Armenia	25
3	(Armenia) Grenik Petrosyan	BKMA	15
4	(France) Seryozh Titizyan	Ararat-2	12
5	(Armenia) Andranik Kocharyan	Noravank	9
5	(Nigeria) Charles Mark Ikechukwu	West Armenia	9
7	(Armenia) Narek Grigoryan	BKMA	8
8	(Armenia) Hakob Loretsyan	West Armenia	7
8	(Armenia) Artur Miskirijyan	Urartu-2	7
8	(Armenia) Norik Mkrtchyan	Lernayin Artsakh	7
