= Shuaibu Ibrahim =

Nigerian footballer

Ibrahim Shuaibu
Personal information
- Full name: Ibrahim Lalle Shuaibu
- Date of birth: 19 December 1996 (age 29)
- Place of birth: Kaduna, Nigeria
- Height: 1.77 m (5 ft 9 1/2 in)
- Position: Striker

Youth career
- –2015: Golden Boot Soccer Academy

Senior career*
Years	Team	Apps	(Gls)
2015	→ Giwa (loan)		
2016–2020	Haugesund	48	(8)
2018	→ Kongsvinger (loan)	29	(15)
2019	→ Bnei Sakhnin (loan)	11	(0)
2019	→ Kongsvinger (loan)	10	(6)
2020–2021	Mjøndalen	33	(7)
2021	Jerv	15	(5)
2022	Noravank	17	(10)
2022–2023	Erbil		
2023	Niger Tornadoes		
2023–2024	Radwa		
2024	Khaybar		
- * Club domestic league appearances and goals as of 10:46, 30 May 2022 (UTC)

Ibrahim Lalle Shuabu (born 19 December 1996) is a Nigerian professional footballer who plays as a striker.

== Career ==
=== Club ===
After playing for Giwa FC on loan for the 2015 season, Ibrahim went on trial with Norwegian side FK Haugesund in early 2016. Following a successful trial period, Ibrahim signed a three-year contract with Haugesund on 30 January 2016.

On 13 February 2022, Armenian Premier League club Noravank announced the singing of Ibrahim.

On 5 August 2022, Shuaibu Ibrahim joined Iraqi club Erbil.

== Career statistics ==
=== Club ===
As of match played 28 May 2022

Appearances and goals by club, season and competition
Club	Season	League			National Cup		Continental		Other		Total	
Club	Season	Division	Apps	Goals	Apps	Goals	Apps	Goals	Apps	Goals	Apps	Goals
Haugesund	2016	Eliteserien	17	2	3	3	—		—		20	5
Haugesund	2017	Eliteserien	29	6	3	3	4	2	—		36	11
Haugesund	2018	Eliteserien	1	0	0	0	—		—		1	0
Haugesund	2019	Eliteserien	1	0	0	0	1	0	—		2	0
Haugesund	Total		48	8	6	6	5	2	—		59	16
Kongsvinger (loan)	2018	1. divisjon	29	15	3	2	—		—		32	17
Bnei Sakhnin (loan)	2018–19	Israeli Premier League	11	0	1	1	—		—		12	1
Kongsvinger (loan)	2019	1. divisjon	10	6	0	0	—		2 (Note: Appearances in promotion play-offs)	0	12	6
Mjøndalen	2020	Eliteserien	27	6	—		—		1 (Note: Appearance in relegation play-offs)	0	28	6
Mjøndalen	2021	Eliteserien	6	1	2	1	—		—		8	2
Mjøndalen	Total		33	7	2	1	—		1	0	36	8
Jerv	2021	1. divisjon	15	5	0	0	—		2	1	17	6
Noravank	2021–22	Armenian Premier League	17	10	2	0	—		—		19	10
Career total			163	51	14	10	5	2	5	1	187	64

== Honours ==
Noravank

- Armenian Cup: 2021–22
