= Henri Avagyan =

Armenian footballer

Henri Avakian
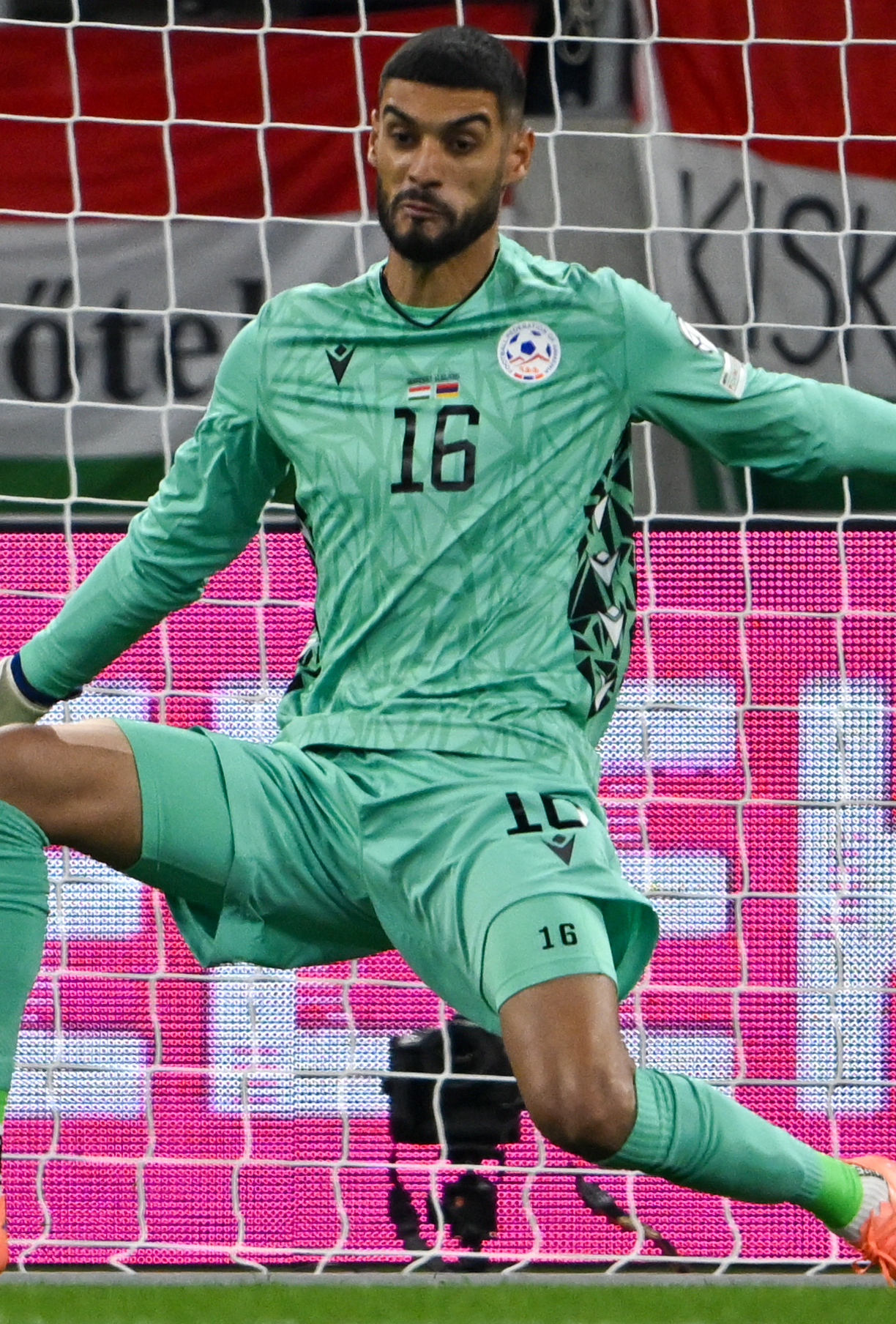
- Avagyan in 2025

Personal information
- Full name: Henri Mikayeli Avagyan
- Date of birth: 16 January 1996 (age 30)
- Place of birth: Yerevan, Armenia
- Height: 1.91 m (6 ft 3 in)
- Position: Goalkeeper

Team information
- Current team: Pyunik
- Number: 16

Youth career
- –2013: Mika

Senior career*
Years	Team	Apps	(Gls)
2013–2015	Mika II		
2014–2016	Mika	2	(0)
2016–2018	Banants	4	(0)
2018–2020	Alashkert	7	(0)
2020–2021	Van	10	(0)
2022	Noravank	16	(0)
2022	BKMA Yerevan	16	(0)
2023–2025	Pyunik	19	(0)
2025	Ararat-Armenia	10	(0)
2025–	Pyunik	26	(0)

International career^{‡}
2012	Armenia U17	2	(0)
2017–2018	Armenia U21	10	(0)
2018–	Armenia	8	(0)
- * Club domestic league appearances and goals as of 18 June 2026 ‡ National team caps and goals as of 29 March 2026 (UTC)

Henri Avagyan (Armenian: Հենրի Ավագյան; born 16 January 1996) is an Armenian professional footballer who plays as a goalkeeper for Pyunik and the Armenia national team.

== Career ==
=== Club ===
On 5 August 2020, Avagyan signed for FC Van.

On 28 December 2022, FC Pyunik announced the signing of Avagyan.

On 13 January 2025, Ararat-Armenia announced the signing of Avagyan, with Pyunik announcing his departure four days later.

On 4 July 2025, Avagyan returned to Pyunik.

=== International ===
Avagyan made his international debut for Armenia on 19 November 2018, starting in the 2018–19 UEFA Nations League D match against Liechtenstein, which finished as a 2–2 away draw.

== Career statistics ==
=== Club ===
As of match played on 24 May 2025

Club statistics
Club	Season	League			National Cup		Continental		Other		Total	
Club	Season	Division	Apps	Goals	Apps	Goals	Apps	Goals	Apps	Goals	Apps	Goals
Banants	2016–17	Armenian Premier League	4	0	0	0	0 (Note: Appearances in the UEFA Europa League)	0	-		4	0
Banants	2017–18	Armenian Premier League	0	0	0	0	-		-		0	0
Banants	Total		4	0	0	0	-	-	-	-	4	0
Alashkert	2018–19	Armenian Premier League	6	0	2	0	0 (Note: Zero appearances in the UEFA Champions League and UEFA Europa League)	0	1	0	9	0
Alashkert	2019–20	Armenian Premier League	1	0	1	0	0	0	1	0	3	0
Alashkert	Total		7	0	3	0	0	0	2	0	12	0
Van	2020–21	Armenian Premier League	10	0	1	0	-		-		11	0
Noravank	2021–22	Armenian Premier League	16	0	2	0	-		-		18	0
BKMA Yerevan	2022–23	Armenian Premier League	16	0	0	0	-		-		16	0
Pyunik	2022–23	Armenian Premier League	2	0	1	0	0 (Note: Zero appearances in the UEFA Champions League, UEFA Europa League, and UEFA Europa Conference League)	0	-		3	0
Pyunik	2023–24	Armenian Premier League	5	0	1	0	0 (Note: Appearances in the UEFA Conference League)	0	-		6	0
Pyunik	2024–25	Armenian Premier League	12	0	0	0	8 (Note: Two appearances in the UEFA Champions League and six appearances in the UEFA Europa Conference League)	0	0 (Note: Appearances in the Armenian Supercup)	0	20	0
Pyunik	Total		19	0	2	0	8	0	0	0	29	0
Ararat-Armenia	2024–25	Armenian Premier League	10	0	5	0	0	0	1	0	16	0
Career totals			82	0	15	0	8	0	3	0	108	0

=== International ===
As of 29 March 2026

Armenia
Year	Apps	Goals
2018	1	0
2025	6	0
2026	1	0
Total	8	0

== Honours ==
Pyunik

- Armenian Premier League: 2023–24

Noravank

- Armenian Cup: 2021–22

Alashkert

- Armenian Cup: 2018–19

Ararat-Armenia

- Armenian Supercup: 2024
