= Artur Sokhiyev =

Russian footballer

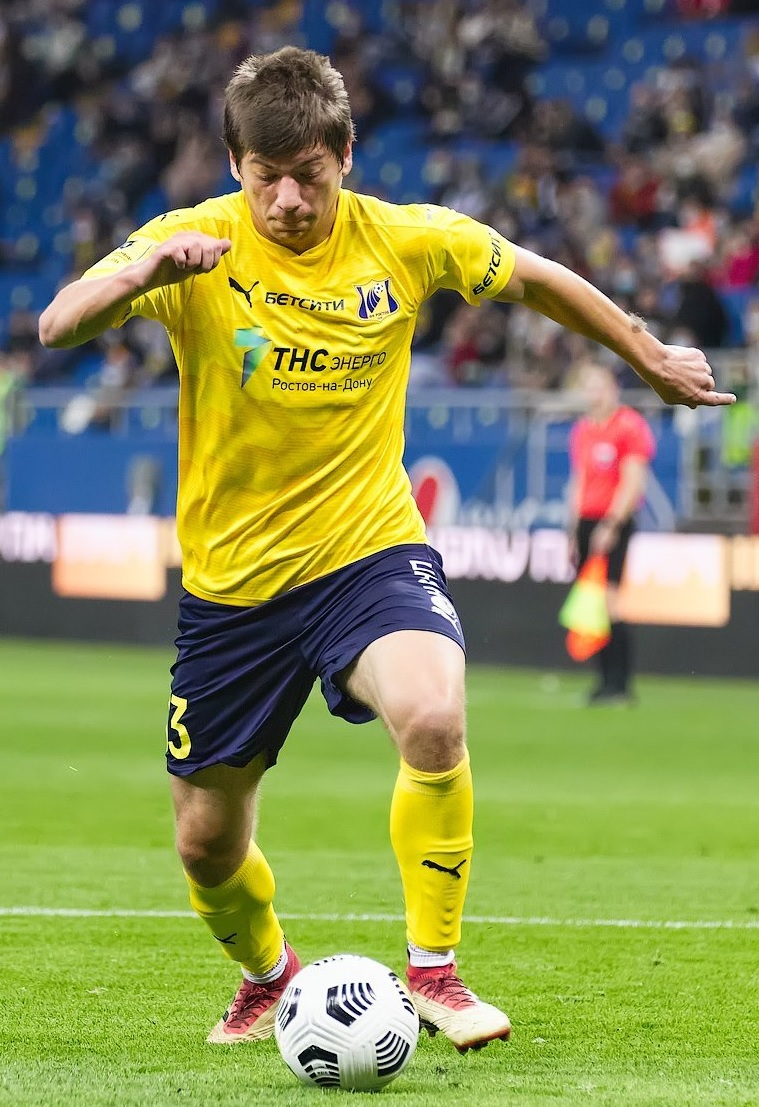
- Sokhiyev with FC Rostov in 2020

Personal information
- Full name: Artur Maratovich Sokhiyev
- Date of birth: 27 September 2002 (age 24)
- Height: 1.83 m (6 ft 0 in)
- Position: Forward

Team information
- Current team: Alashkert

Youth career
- Digora

Senior career*
Years	Team	Apps	(Gls)
2020	Spartak Vladikavkaz	1	(0)
2020–2021	Rostov	3	(0)
2021	→ Yessentuki (loan)	0	(0)
2021–2022	Noravank	7	(0)
2022	Dynamo Stavropol	10	(2)
2022	Dynamo Makhachkala	3	(0)
2022	Yessentuki	0	(0)
2023	Pobeda Khasavyurt	2	(0)
2023	Biolog-Novokubansk	5	(2)
2024–	Alashkert	10	(0)
- * Club domestic league appearances and goals as of 1 June 2024

Artur Maratovich Sokhiyev (Russian: Артур Маратович Сохиев; born 27 September 2002) is a Russian football player who plays for Armenian club Alashkert.

== Club career ==
He made his debut in the Russian Premier League for FC Rostov on 18 October 2020 in a game against FC Akhmat Grozny.

On 24 February 2021, he was loaned to FC Yessentuki.

On 10 September 2021, Sokhiyev signed for Armenian Premier League club Noravank. Sokhiyev left Noravank by mutual agreement on 18 January 2022.

On 15 February 2024, Alashkert announced the signing of Sokhiyev.

== Career statistics ==
=== Club ===
As of match played 6 November 2021

Appearances and goals by club, season and competition
Club	Season	League			National Cup		Continental		Other		Total	
Club	Season	Division	Apps	Goals	Apps	Goals	Apps	Goals	Apps	Goals	Apps	Goals
Spartak Vladikavkaz	2019–20	Russian PFL	1	0	0	0	—		—		1	0
Rostov	2020–21	Russian Premier League	3	0	0	0	0 (Note: Appearances in the UEFA Europa League)	0	—		3	0
Yessentuki (loan)	2020–21	FNL2	0	0	0	0	—		—		0	0
Noravank	2021–22	Armenian Premier League	7	0	1	1	—		—		8	1
Career total			11	0	1	1	-	-	-	-	12	1
