= Yevgeni Kobzar =

Russian footballer

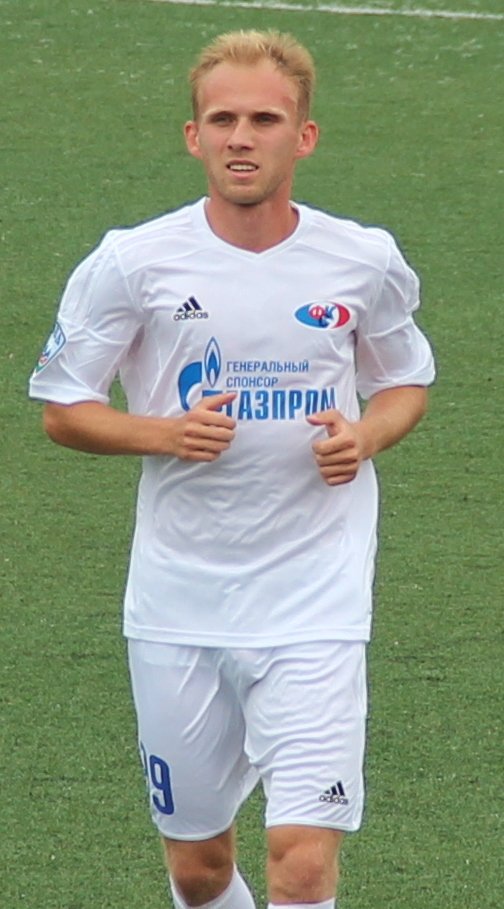

Personal information
- Full name: Yevgeni Vasilyevich Kobzar
- Date of birth: 9 August 1992 (age 34)
- Place of birth: Stavropol, Russia
- Height: 1.71 m (5 ft 7 1/2 in)
- Position: Forward

Team information
- Current team: FC Elektroavtomatika Stavropol

Senior career*
Years	Team	Apps	(Gls)
2009–2012	CSKA Moscow	0	(0)
2012	→ FC Khimki (loan)	6	(0)
2013–2014	Lokomotiv-2 Moscow	39	(18)
2014–2015	Sakhalin	29	(3)
2015	Zenit-Izhevsk	11	(2)
2016–2018	Levadia Tallinn	64	(22)
2018–2019	FK Spartaks Jūrmala	26	(6)
2019–2021	Urartu	45	(11)
2022	Noravank	16	(2)
2022–2023	Shakhter Karagandy	12	(2)
2023	Akzhayik	12	(7)
2023	Aksu	11	(2)
2024–	FC Elektroavtomatika Stavropol		
- * Club domestic league appearances and goals as of 19 November 2023

Yevgeni Vasilyevich Kobzar (Russian: Евгений Васильевич Кобзарь; born 9 August 1992) is a Russian professional footballer who plays as a forward for amateur side FC Elektroavtomatika Stavropol.

== Club career ==
Kobzar made his debut in the Russian Football National League for FC Khimki on 7 August 2012 in a game against FC Sibir Novosibirsk.

=== Armenia ===
On 7 June 2021, FC Urartu announced that Kobzar had left the club after his contract expired. After leaving Urartu, Kobzar signed for Noravank on 8 February 2022.

=== Kazakhstan ===
On 7 July 2022, Shakhter Karagandy announced the signing of Kobzar.

== Club ==
Noravank

- Armenian Cup: 2021–22

=== Individual ===
- Meistriliiga Player of the Month: August 2017
