= Daniil Yarusov =

Russian footballer

Personal information
- Full name: Daniil Sergeyevich Yarusov
- Date of birth: 25 January 2001 (age 25)
- Place of birth: Mezhdurechensk, Russia
- Height: 1.87 m (6 ft 2 in)
- Position: Goalkeeper

Youth career
- –2012: DYuSSh A.I. Zinina Mezhdurechensk
- 2012–2013: UOR Master-Saturn Yegoryevsk
- 2013–2019: FC Spartak Moscow

Senior career*
Years	Team	Apps	(Gls)
2018–2020	FC Spartak-2 Moscow	0	(0)
2020–2021	FC Chayka Peschanokopskoye	1	(0)
2021–2022	FC Olimp-Dolgoprudny-2	5	(0)
2022	Noravank SC	1	(0)
2022–2023	FC Balashikha	15	(0)
2023	FC Yenisey Krasnoyarsk	2	(0)
2023–2024	FC Yenisey-2 Krasnoyarsk	12	(0)
- * Club domestic league appearances and goals as of 25 June 2024

Daniil Sergeyevich Yarusov (Russian: Даниил Сергеевич Ярусов; born 25 January 2001) is a Russian football player who plays as a goalkeeper.

== Club career ==
He made his debut in the Russian Football National League for FC Chayka Peschanokopskoye on 29 November 2020 in a game against FC Volgar Astrakhan.
