= Tenton Yenne =

Nigerian footballer (born 2000)

Personal information
- Date of birth: 7 July 2000 (age 26)
- Place of birth: Jos, Nigeria
- Height: 1.78 m (5 ft 10 in)
- Position: Left winger

Team information
- Current team: Vanspor
- Number: 15

Youth career
- GBS Academy
- 2018: AS Trenčín
- 2019: GBS Academy

Senior career*
Years	Team	Apps	(Gls)
2019−2020	Senica	39	(3)
2021	Žilina B	18	(1)
2022	Noravank	16	(3)
2022–2025	Ararat-Armenia	94	(43)
2025–	Baltika Kaliningrad	20	(0)
2026–	→ Vanspor (loan)	1	(0)
- * Club domestic league appearances and goals as of 6 September 2026

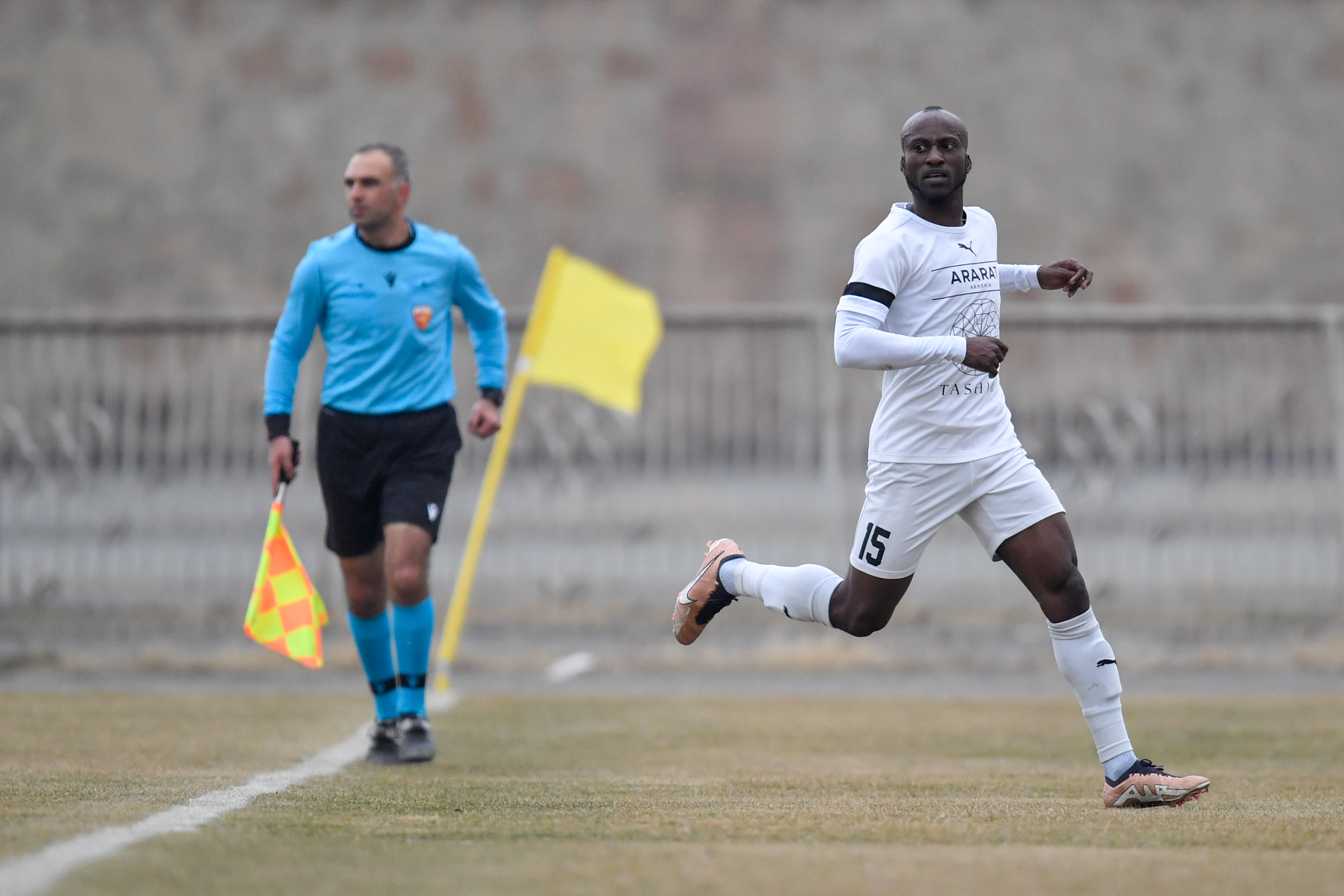
Tenton Yenne (Right), 2023

Tenton Yenne (born 7 July 2000) is a Nigerian professional footballer who plays as a left winger for Turkish club Vanspor on loan from the Russian club Baltika Kaliningrad.

== Club career ==
=== FK Senica ===
Yenne made his Fortuna Liga debut for Senica against AS Trenčín on 20 July 2019, during the premier round of the season. Yenne was featured directly in the starting-XI and had spent a majority of the match on the pitch. He had impressed with two assists, contributing to a rather surprising 3–1 victory. He first crossed the ball to Eneji Moses, who equalised the score to 1–1. In second-half stoppage time, Yenne was fouled in the penalty area and Frank Castañeda had converted the penalty, sealing the score of the game, even though AS Trenčín were in the lead after the first half, thanks to former Slovak international David Depetris.

Yenne scored his first goal for Senica on 9 November 2019, during his 13th league appearance for the club. In a home fixture against Zemplín Michalovce he opened the scoresheet of the match after 54 minutes by converting a pass from Edmund Addo, commencing a fruitful half-time for Senica as, after further strikes from Frank Castañeda and Samson Akinyoola, they collected a 4–0 victory.

=== MŠK Žilina ===
On 21 January 2021, it was announced that Yenne had signed a three-year contract with multiple time Slovak champions MŠK Žilina. His move was a part of a swap deal when ex-Slovak under-21 international Martin Gamboš had moved to Senica.

=== Ararat-Armenia ===
On 7 July 2022, Ararat-Armenia announced the signing of Yenne.

On 1 June 2025, Ararat-Armenia announced the departure of Yenne.

=== Baltika Kaliningrad ===
On 1 June 2025, Yenne signed a three-year contract with Russian Premier League club Baltika Kaliningrad. On 4 September 2026, he was loaned to Vanspor in Turkey for the season.

=== Vanspor (loan) ===
Yenne joined the Turkish 1. Lig club Vanspor on loan on 4 September 2026.

== Career statistics ==
=== Club ===
As of match played 6 September 2026

Appearances and goals by club, season and competition
Club	Season	League			National Cup		Continental		Other		Total	
Club	Season	Division	Apps	Goals	Apps	Goals	Apps	Goals	Apps	Goals	Apps	Goals
Senica	2019–20	Slovak Super Liga	22	1	1	0	–				23	1
Senica	2020–21	Slovak Super Liga	17	1	0	0	–				17	1
Senica	Total		39	2	1	0	-	-	-	-	40	2
MŠK Žilina	2020–21	Slovak Super Liga	0	0	0	0	–				0	0
MŠK Žilina	2021–22	Slovak Super Liga	0	0	0	0	0 (Note: Appearances and goals in the UEFA Europa Conference League)	0	–		0	0
MŠK Žilina	Total		0	0	0	0	0	0	-	-	0	0
MŠK Žilina B	2020–21	2. Liga	8	0	–						8	0
MŠK Žilina B	2021–22	2. Liga	13	1	–						13	1
MŠK Žilina B	Total		21	1	-	-	-	-	-	-	21	1
Noravank	2021–22	Armenian Premier League	16	3	2	1	–				18	4
Ararat-Armenia	2022–23	Armenian Premier League	34	10	1	0	2	0	–		37	10
Ararat-Armenia	2023–24	Armenian Premier League	32	16	4	0	4	1	–		40	17
Ararat-Armenia	2024–25	Armenian Premier League	28	17	4	1	4	1	1 (Note: Appearances and goals in the Armenian Supercup)	1	37	20
Ararat-Armenia	Total		94	43	9	1	10	2	1	1	114	47
Baltika Kaliningrad	2025–26	Russian Premier League	19	0	7	2	–		–		26	2
Baltika Kaliningrad	2026–27	Russian Premier League	1	0	2	0	–		–		3	0
Baltika Kaliningrad	Total		20	0	9	2	0	0	0	0	29	2
Vanspor	2026–27	TFF First League	1	0	0	0	–		–		1	0
Vanspor	Career total		188	49	21	4	10	2	1	1	220	55

== Honours ==
Noravank

- Armenian Cup: 2021–22

Individual

- Armenian Premier League Player of the Season: 2023–24
