= 2021–22 Armenian Cup =

Tournament details
- Country: Armenia
- Teams: 12

Final positions
- Champions: Noravank
- Runners-up: Urartu

Tournament statistics
- Matches played: 11
- Goals scored: 27 (2.45 per match)
- All statistics correct as of 8 May 2022.

The 2021–22 Armenian Cup was the 31st edition of the football competition in Armenia. The competition began on 15 September 2021 and concluded on 8 May 2022 with Noravank winning their first title. Ararat Yerevan were the defending champions of the cup after defeating Alashkert in the previous season's final.

== Teams ==
Round	Clubs remaining	Clubs involved	Winners from previous round	New entries this round	Leagues entering at this round
First Round	12	8	None	8	2 Armenian First League teams 6 Armenian Premier League teams
Quarterfinals	8	8	4	4	4 Armenian Premier League teams
Semifinals	4	4	4	none	none
Final	2	2	2	none	none

== First round ==
15 September 2021	Shirak	0–1	Noravank	Gyumri
15:30 (UTC+4)	Davit Ghandilyan (yellow card) 22'; Seryozha Urushanyan (yellow card) 42'; Vrezh Torosyan (yellow card) 90+7'	Report	Sokhiyev 74'; Davit Minasyan (yellow card) 90+6'	Stadium: Gyumri City Stadium; Attendance: 60; Referee: Zaven Hovhannisyan

16 September 2021	Lernayin Artsakh	1–2	Ararat-Armenia	Sisian
15:30 (UTC+4)	Matarr Badjie 41'; Khalifa Sow (yellow card) 50'; Sergey Asryan (yellow card) 74'; Sargis Metoyan (yellow card) 82'	Report	Avanesyan 18'; Klymenchuk (yellow card) 39'; Lima 86'	Stadium: Sisian City Stadium; Attendance: 100; Referee: Ashot Ghaltakchyan

17 September 2021	Van	2–2 (a.e.t.) (3–1 p)	Sevan	Charentsavan
15:30 (UTC+4)	Batyrkanov 44', 72'; Dmitri Kuzkin (yellow card) 57'; Argishti Petrosyan (yellow card) 87'	Report	Babou Cham 24'; Claudir 90' (pen.); Artur Avagyan (yellow card) 117'; Kartashyan (yellow card) 119'	Stadium: Charentsavan City Stadium; Attendance: 400; Referee: Henrik Nalbandyan
	Penalties
	Argishti Petrosyan (penalty scored); Voskanyan (penalty missed); Vahagn Ayvazyan (penalty scored); Bruno (penalty scored)		(penalty missed) André Mensalão; (penalty scored) Duranski; (penalty missed) Kartashyan; (penalty missed) Bissainthe

17 September 2021	BKMA Yerevan	1–2	Pyunik	Yerevan
19:30 (UTC+4)	Petros Manukyan (yellow card) 41'; Artur Serobyan 52'; Ishkhanyan (yellow card) 85'	Report	Bratkov (yellow card) 39'; Firmino 65', 90'	Stadium: FFA Academy Stadium; Attendance: 350; Referee: Artem Gasparyan

== Quarterfinals ==
21 November 2021	Urartu	2–0	Alashkert	Yerevan
18:30 (UTC+4)	Désiré 30'; Paramonov (yellow card) 42'; Polyakov (yellow card) 49'; Grigoryan (yellow card) 53'; Hakobyan (yellow card) 73' (goal) 78'; Vitinho (yellow card) 80'; Beglaryan (yellow card) 80'	Report	Gome (yellow card) 20'; Voskanyan (yellow card) 45'; Cametá (yellow card) 74'	Stadium: Urartu Stadium; Attendance: 700; Referee: Henrik Nalbandyan

23 November 2021	Pyunik	1–1 (a.e.t.) (2–4 p)	Van	Yerevan
18:00 (UTC+4)	Gareginyan (yellow card) 14'; Carlitos (yellow card) 99'; Stepanov 101' (o.g.)	Report	Stepanov (yellow card) 36' (goal) 117'; Stéphane Adjouman (yellow card) 49'; Argishti Petrosyan (yellow card) 80'	Stadium: Republican Stadium; Attendance: 300; Referee: Zaven Hovhannisyan
	Penalties
	Harutyunyan (penalty scored); Caraballo (penalty missed); José Balza (penalty missed); Bruno (penalty scored)		Bruno Miguel (penalty scored); Akhmed Jindoyan (penalty scored); Erik Azizyan (penalty scored); Batyrkanov (penalty scored)

24 November 2021	Noravank	2–1	Ararat-Armenia	Charentsavan
14:00 (UTC+4)	Mustafin 28'; Ebert (yellow card) 46'; Orlov 69' (yellow card) 90'; Daniil Polyanskiy (yellow card) 88'	Report	Klymenchuk (yellow card) 17'; Otubanjo 71'; Ambartsumyan (yellow card) 88'; Terteryan (yellow card) 90'	Stadium: Charentsavan City Stadium; Attendance: 100; Referee: Ashot Ghaltakchyan

25 November 2021	Ararat Yerevan	1–0	Noah	Yerevan
18:00 (UTC+4)	Hovhannes Nazaryan 31'; E.Malakyan (yellow card) 41'; Díaz (yellow card) 69'; G.Malakyan (yellow card) 86'; Mkoyan (yellow card) 90+3'	Report	Grigori Matevosyan (yellow card) 31'; Saná Gomes 85'	Stadium: Republican Stadium; Referee: Artem Gasparyan

== Semi–finals ==
2 April 2022	Ararat Yerevan	1-2	Noravank	Yerevan
18:00 (UTC+4)	R.Mkrtchyan (yellow card) 17'; C.Ouguehi 46'; Mkoyan (yellow card) 90+3'	Report	Rudoselsky 2'; A.Khachatryan (yellow card) 8' (yellow-red card) 35'; A.Avagyan (yellow card) 53'; Mustafin (yellow card) 63'; Bashilov 68'; A.Mkrtchyan (yellow card) 90+2'	Stadium: Republican Stadium; Referee: Henrik Nalbandyan

3 April 2022	Urartu	3-0	Van	Yerevan
18:00 (UTC+4)	H.Hakobyan (yellow card) 42'; Miranyan 52'; A.Ghazaryan (yellow card) 58'; U.Iwu 64'; Désiré 69' (pen.)	Report	E.Mireku (yellow card) 3'; Stepanov (yellow card) 3'; A.Petrosyan (yellow card) 68'; B.Techie (yellow card) 76'	Stadium: Urartu Stadium; Referee: Shahen Aghayan

== Final ==
8 May 2022	Noravank	2-0	Urartu	Yerevan
19:00 (UTC+4)	Mustafin 28' (yellow card) 88'; A.Avagyan (yellow card) 45+2'; Yenne 77'	Report		Stadium: Republican Stadium; Referee: Zaven Hovhannisyan

== Scorers ==
As of match played 8 May 2022

2 goals:

- (Portugal) Hugo Firmino - Pyunik
- (Haiti) Jonel Désiré - Urartu
- (Kyrgyzstan) Ernist Batyrkanov - Van
- (Russia) Temur Mustafin - Noravank

1 goals:

- Artyom Avanesyan - Ararat-Armenia
- (Cape Verde) Mailson Lima - Ararat-Armenia
- (Nigeria) Yusuf Otubanjo - Ararat-Armenia
- (Armenia) Hovhannes Nazaryan - Ararat Yerevan
- (Ivory Coast) Christian Ouguehi - Ararat Yerevan
- (Armenia) Artur Serobyan - BKMA Yerevan
- (The Gambia) Matarr Badjie - Lernayin Artsakh
- (Kazakhstan) Timur Rudoselsky - Noravank
- (Nigeria) Tenton Yenne - Noravank
- (Russia) Sergei Orlov - Noravank
- (Russia) Mikhail Bashilov - Noravank
- (Russia) Artur Sokhiyev - Noravank
- (Brazil) Claudir - Sevan
- (The Gambia) Babou Cham - Sevan
- (Armenia) Artur Miranyan - Urartu
- (Armenia) Hakob Hakobyan - Urartu
- (Nigeria) Uguchukwu Iwu - Urartu
- (Russia) Aleksandr Stepanov - Van

Own goals:

- (Russia) Aleksandr Stepanov - Van vs Pyunik 23 November 2021

== See also ==
- 2021–22 Armenian Premier League
- 2021–22 Armenian First League
