= FC Yessentuki =

Russian football club

- Full name: Football Club Yessentuki
- Founded: 2016
- Dissolved: 2023
- Ground: Yessentuki Stadium
- Capacity: 544
- Manager: Vasily Dorofeyev
- League: Russian Second League, Group 1
- 2022–23: N/A (dropped out)
- Website: https://fcessentuki.ru/
Home colours	Away colours

FC Yessentuki (Russian: ФК «Ессентуки») was a Russian football team based in Yessentuki. It was founded in 2014 and played on the amateur level. For 2020–21 season, it received the license for the third-tier Russian Professional Football League. On 12 April 2023, Yessentuki dropped out of the 2022–23 Russian Second League as their license was recalled for multiple violations.
