= Mikhail Bashilov =

Russian professional football player

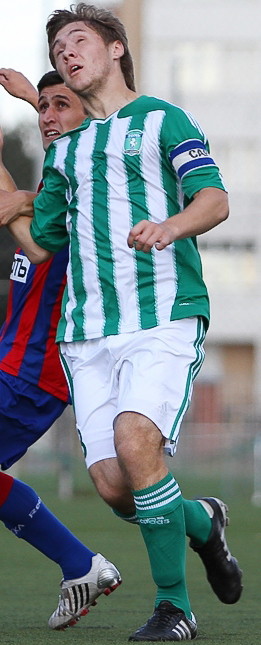

Personal information
- Full name: Mikhail Sergeyevich Bashilov
- Date of birth: 12 January 1993 (age 33)
- Place of birth: Tomsk, Russia
- Height: 1.79 m (5 ft 10 in)
- Position: Defender

Team information
- Current team: Vitebsk
- Number: 30

Youth career
- Tom Tomsk

Senior career*
Years	Team	Apps	(Gls)
2009–2016	Tom Tomsk	7	(0)
2013	→ Irtysh Omsk (loan)	9	(0)
2013–2014	→ Tyumen (loan)	8	(0)
2014–2016	→ Tom-2 Tomsk	39	(2)
2016	Utenis Utena	7	(0)
2017–2019	Gorodeya	71	(2)
2020	Belshina Bobruisk	13	(1)
2020–2021	Energetik-BGU Minsk	24	(1)
2021–2022	Noravank	32	(0)
2022–2023	Turan	35	(3)
2024–	Vitebsk	60	(4)
- * Club domestic league appearances and goals as of 3 July 2026

Mikhail Sergeyevich Bashilov (Russian: Михаил Серге́евич Башилов; born 12 January 1993) is a Russian professional football player who plays for Vitebsk.

== Career ==
He made his Russian Premier League debut for FC Tom Tomsk on 13 May 2012 in a game against FC Rostov.

== Honours ==
Noravank

- Armenian Cup: 2021–22
