= Iván Díaz (footballer, born 1993) =

Argentine footballer

Personal information
- Full name: Iván Santiago Díaz
- Date of birth: 23 January 1993 (age 33)
- Place of birth: San Fernando, Argentina
- Height: 1.80 m (5 ft 11 in)
- Position: Defensive midfielder

Team information
- Current team: GS Ilioupolis
- Number: 9

Youth career
- 2003–2011: River Plate reserva
- 2011–2012: Panathinaikos

Senior career*
Years	Team	Apps	(Gls)
2012	AS Trenčín	24	(2)
2013	River Plate		
2014	Anorthosis Famagusta		
2016–2020	Žilina	109	(4)
2020	→ Viktoria Plzeň (loan)	1	(0)
2021	Sereď	10	(0)
2021–2022	Ararat Yerevan	30	(0)
2022–	GS Ilioupolis	7	(0)

International career
- Argentina U20
- * Club domestic league appearances and goals as of 07:28, 4 April 2022 (UTC)

Iván Santiago Díaz (born 23 January 1993) is an Argentine footballer, who plays for GS Ilioupolis.

== Career ==
=== Early career ===
Diaz started his career 2003 with River Plate, before joined in August 2011 to Greece side Panathinaikos Athens.

=== AS Trenčín ===
On 8 February 2012, Díaz has signed 4-year contract with AS Trenčín. His debut came on 24 March 2012 in a Corgoň Liga match against Slovan Bratislava, entering as a substitute in place of Samuel Štefánik. After 19 games in the Corgoň Liga for AS Trenčín, he returned to River Plate, in February 2013. In winter 2013, he left the club without explanation.

=== Ararat Yerevan ===
On 26 July 2021, Díaz signed for Armenian Premier League club Ararat Yerevan. On 1 August 2022, Ararat Yerevan announced that Díaz had left the club at the end of his contract.

== Honours ==
=== MŠK Žilina ===
- Fortuna Liga: Winners: 2016-17
