= Temur Mustafin =

Russian football player (born 1995)

Personal information
- Full name: Temur Ildarovich Mustafin
- Date of birth: 15 April 1995 (age 31)
- Place of birth: Tashkent, Uzbekistan
- Height: 1.79 m (5 ft 10 in)
- Position: Defender

Team information
- Current team: Alga Bishkek

Youth career
- Konoplyov football academy
- 2010–2011: Rostov
- 2012–2014: Lokomotiv Moscow

Senior career*
Years	Team	Apps	(Gls)
2014–2016	Rostov	0	(0)
2014–2016	→ Avangard Kursk (loan)	25	(0)
2016–2017	Zenit-2 Saint Petersburg	20	(1)
2017–2018	Fakel Voronezh	20	(0)
2018	Sochi	8	(0)
2019	Armavir	0	(0)
2019–2020	Olimp Khimki	7	(0)
2020–2021	Chernomorets Novorossiysk	19	(0)
2021–2022	Noravank	30	(1)
2022	Shakhter Karagandy	3	(0)
2023–2024	Abdysh-Ata Kant	12	(0)
2024–2025	Dynamo Bryansk	25	(1)
2025–	Alga Bishkek	0	(0)

International career
2010	Russia U-15	2	(0)
2010–2011	Russia U-16	10	(0)
2011–2012	Russia U-17	4	(0)
2013	Russia U-18	2	(0)
2013–2014	Russia U-19	4	(0)
- * Club domestic league appearances and goals as of 5 July 2025

Temur Ildarovich Mustafin (Russian: Темур Ильдарович Мустафин; born 15 April 1995) is a Russian football player who plays for Kyrgyz club Alga Bishkek.

== Club career ==
Mustafin made his professional debut in the Russian Professional Football League for FC Avangard Kursk on 4 September 2014 in a game against FC Kaluga.

Mustafin made his Russian Football National League debut for FC Zenit-2 Saint Petersburg on 11 July 2016 in a game against FC Sokol Saratov.

Mustafin took 2nd place in the 2018–19 FNL championship as a member of PFC Sochi.

On 18 July 2022, Shakhter Karagandy announced the signing of Mustafin.

On 30 January 2023, Abdysh-Ata Kant announced the signing of Mustafin.

== Honours ==
Noravank

- Armenian Cup: 2021–22
