= Sergei Orlov (footballer, born 1989) =

Russian footballer

Personal information
- Full name: Sergei Aleksandrovich Orlov
- Date of birth: 20 April 1989 (age 37)
- Place of birth: Ozyory, Moscow Oblast, Russian SFSR
- Height: 1.76 m (5 ft 9 in)
- Position: Midfielder

Youth career
- 2001–2007: DYuSSh Ozyory

Senior career*
Years	Team	Apps	(Gls)
2008–2009	FC Nika Ozyory		
2009–2010	FC Ryazan	6	(0)
2010	FC Lukhovitsy (amateur)		
2011–2012	FC Kolomna (amateur)		
2013–2016	FC Tekstilshchik Ivanovo	80	(19)
2016	FC Sochi	1	(0)
2016–2018	FC Tekstilshchik Ivanovo	45	(15)
2018	FC Fakel Voronezh	16	(0)
2019	FC Kolomna	7	(1)
2019–2020	FC West Armenia	23	(27)
2020	FC Kolomna	1	(0)
2020–2021	FC West Armenia	22	(25)
2021–2022	Noravank SC	26	(6)
2022	FC Elektron Veliky Novgorod	6	(1)
2023	FC Balashikha	6	(4)
- * Club domestic league appearances and goals

Sergei Aleksandrovich Orlov (Russian: Серге́й Александрович Орлов; born 20 April 1989) is a Russian former professional football player.

== Club career ==
He played in the Russian Football National League for FC Fakel Voronezh in 2018.
