= Ebert (footballer) =

Brazilian footballer (born 1993)

Personal information
- Full name: Ebert Cardoso da Silva
- Date of birth: 25 May 1993 (age 33)
- Place of birth: Nortelândia, Mato Grosso, Brazil
- Height: 1.82 m (6 ft 0 in)
- Position: Left-back

Team information
- Current team: Kukësi
- Number: 25

Youth career
- 20??–2014: Internacional

Senior career*
Years	Team	Apps	(Gls)
2014–2015	Internacional	0	(0)
2016–2017	Macaé	31	(1)
2018	Stal Kamianske	10	(0)
2019	Botev Plovdiv	25	(1)
2020	Urartu	3	(0)
2020	Van	13	(0)
2021	Metal Kharkiv	2	(0)
2021–2022	Noravank	28	(2)
2022–	Kukësi	20	(1)
- * Club domestic league appearances and goals as of 11 March 2023

Ebert Cardoso da Silva (born 25 May 1993), or simply Ebert, is a Brazilian professional footballer who plays as a left-back for Kukësi.

== Career ==
Ebert is a product of the Internacional youth sportive system, while in Brazil, he also played for Macaé. In early 2018, Ebert signed a 2 1/2-year contract with Ukrainian Premier League club Stal Kamianske. One year later, in January 2019, he joined Bulgarian club Botev Plovdiv.

On 3 February 2020, FC Urartu announced the signing of Ebert. On 14 July 2020, Ebert left Urartu by mutual agreement. On 31 July 2020, Ebert signed for FC Van. On 23 January 2021, Ebert left Van by mutual consent.

== Personal life ==
His older brother, Everton Cardoso da Silva, is also a professional football player.

== Honours ==
Noravank

- Armenian Cup: 2021–22
