= FC Balashikha =

Russian football team based in Moscow

- Full name: Football Club Balashikha
- Founded: 2008
- Manager: Vacant
- League: TBC
- 2022–23: Russian Second League, 24th
- Website: http://fcbalashikha.tilda.ws/

FC Balashikha (Russian: ФК «Балашиха») is a Russian football team based in Balashikha.

== Club history ==
The club was founded in 2008 and played on the amateur levels. For the 2022–23 season, the club was licensed for the third-tier Russian Second League. The club did not apply for the 2023–24 Russian Second League.
