= Noravank SC =

Armenian football club

- Full name: Noravank Sport Club
- Founded: 2020; 6 years ago
- Dissolved: 2022; 4 years ago
- Ground: Arevik Stadium, Vayk
- League: Armenian Premier League
- 2021–22: 7th (dissolved after the season)
- Website: https://noravanksport.am/
Home colours	Away colours

Noravank Sport Club (Armenian: Նորավանք մարզական ակումբ), was a football club based in Vayk, Armenia, which played in the Armenian Premier League.

== History ==
Noravank Sport Club was founded in 2020 and participated in 2020–21 Armenian First League.

=== League and cup ===
Season	League										National Cup	Top goalscorer	
Season	Div.	Pos.	Pl.	W	D	L	GS	GA	GD	P	National Cup	Name	League
2020–21	Armenian First League	3rd	27	16	2	9	45	31	+14	50	First round		
2021–22	Armenian Premier League	7th	32	7	7	18	36	55	–19	28	Winners	Shuaibu Ibrahim	10
2022–	No Participation												

== Grounds ==
Noravank trained and held their home matches at the Charentsavan City Stadium whilst renovation work was carried out on their Vayk Stadium.

== Final squad ==
As of 8 March 2022

Note: Flags indicate national team as defined under FIFA eligibility rules; some limited exceptions apply. Players may hold more than one non-FIFA nationality.

No.	Pos.	Nation	Player
1	GK	ARM	Henri Avagyan
3	DF	ARM	Gagik Maghakyan
5	DF	ARM	Norayr Nikoghosyan
6	MF	NGA	Moses Candidus
7	MF	ARM	Andranik Kocharyan
8	MF	NGA	Julius Ufuoma
9	FW	RUS	Yevgeni Kobzar
10	MF	ARM	Karen Nalbandyan
11	DF	ARM	Arman Asilyan
12	GK	RUS	Daniil Yarusov
14	DF	ARM	Arman Khachatryan
15	FW	NGA	Tenton Yenne

No.	Pos.	Nation	Player
17	FW	NGA	Shuaibu Ibrahim
18	MF	GAM	Babou Cham
20	DF	GHA	Simon Obonde (loan from Cheetah)
21	DF	ARM	Arthur Avagyan
22	DF	KAZ	Timur Rudoselsky
25	DF	BRA	Ebert
26	FW	NGA	Sunday Ingbede
31	GK	ARM	Narek Voskanyan
63	DF	RUS	Temur Mustafin
77	MF	ARM	Davit Minasyan
88	MF	ARM	Aram Kocharyan
99	DF	ARM	Arman Mkrtchyan

== Honours ==
- Armenian First League
  - Third Place (1): 2020–21
- Armenian Cup
  - Winner (1): 2021–22

== Managerial history ==
As of match played 28 May 2022

Name	Nat.	From	To	P	W	D	L	GS	GA	%W	Honours	Notes
Vahe Gevorgyan	(Armenia)	1 July 2020	31 May 2022	65	27	10	28	88	90	41.54	Armenian Cup (x1)	
