= Charentsavan City Stadium =

Stadium in city of charentsavan

Coordinates: 40°24′31″N 44°38′44″E

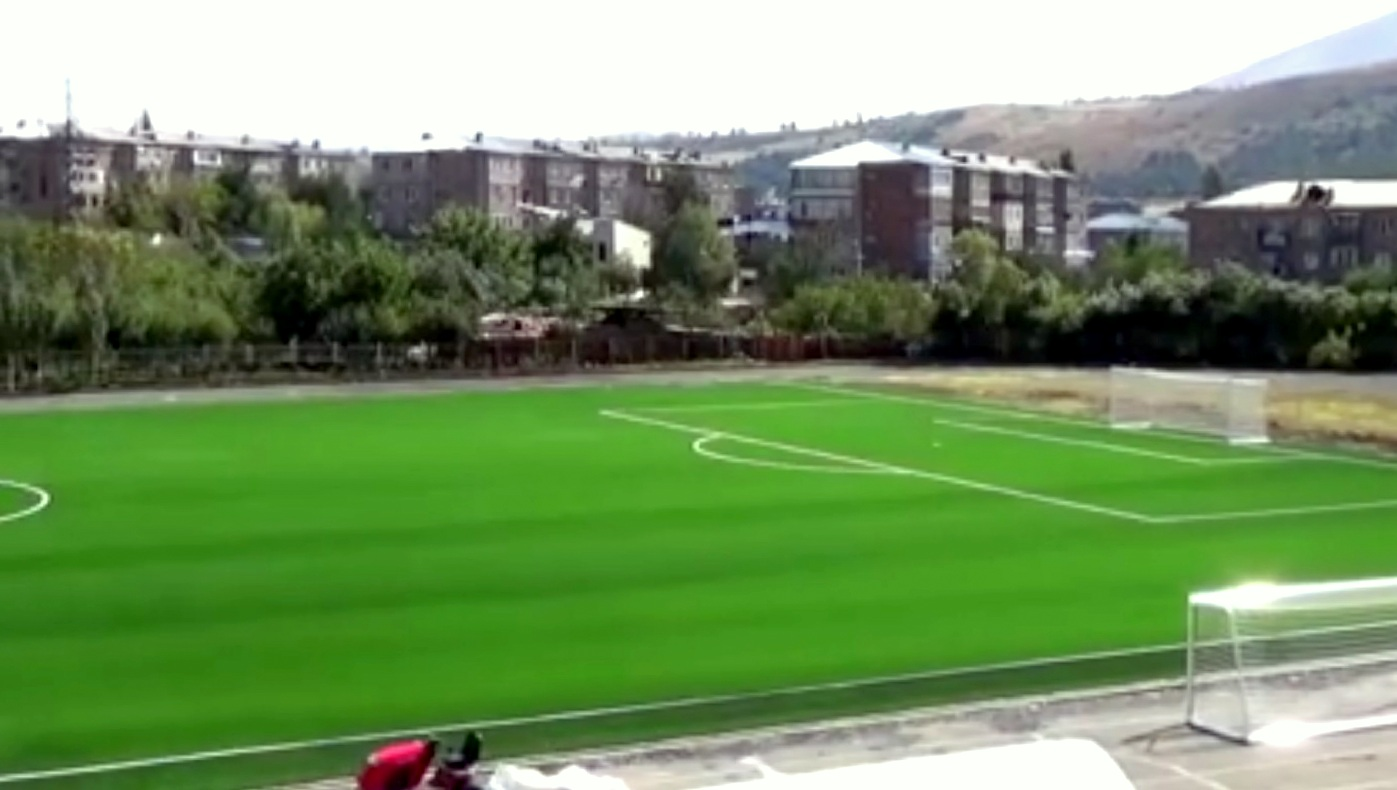
- Interactive map of Charentsavan City Stadium
- Full name: Charentsavan City Stadium
- Location: Charentsavan, Armenia
- Owner: Charentsavan Town Council
- Capacity: 5,000
- Surface: artificial turf
- Field size: 110 x 70 meters

Construction
- Opened: 1970
- Renovated: 2016, 2019

Tenant
- Van (2019-present)

Charentsavan City Stadium (Armenian: Չարենցավանի քաղաքային մարզադաշտ), is a multipurpose stadium in Charentsavan, Armenia, mainly used for football games, as well as local events of athletics.

== Overview ==
It was opened in 1970 and has a capacity of 5,000 spectators. It served as a home ground to FC Moush Charentsavan between 1990 and 1994, when the club was dissolved and retired from professional football.

On the occasion of the 2017 Charentsavan youth capital of Armenia, the stadium's pitch was replaced with an artificial turf in September 2016. The renovation process was financed by the Football Federation of Armenia. It is envisaged to turn the venue into an all-seater stadium by the end of 2017.

The stadium is currently used by several youth football schools of Kotayk Province.

== Gallery ==
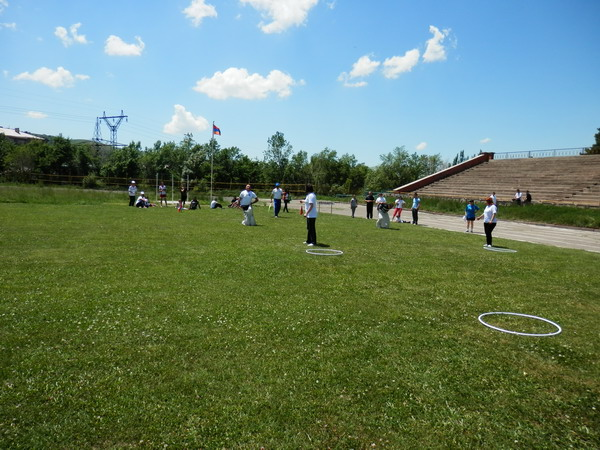
The Stadium before the installation of the artificial turf
