= 2020–21 FC Urartu season =

Urartu
2020-21 season
- Chairman: Hrach Aghabekian
- Manager: Aleksandr Grigoryan (until 9 March); Tigran Yesayan (Caretaker) (from 9 March)
- Stadium: Urartu Stadium
- Armenian Premier League: 3rd
- Armenian Cup: Quarterfinal vs Noah
- Top goalscorer: League: Jonel Désiré (8); All: Jonel Désiré (9)

The 2020–21 season was Urartu's twentieth consecutive season in the Armenian Premier League.

== Season events ==
On 30 July, Urartu's planned friendly match against BKMA Yerevan was cancelled.

On 4 August, Urartu's planned friendly match against Pyunik on 6 August was cancelled.

On 8 August, Urartu announced the signing of Jonel Désiré from Lori FC.

On 11 August, Urartu announced the signing of Juesukobiruo Okotie from Sporting Warri FC, whilst defender Narek Petrosyan left Urartu the following day by mutual consent.

On 17 August, the Football Federation of Armenia announced that that day's match between Urartu and Lori would not take place as Lori still had players and staff in isolation following an outbreak of COVID-19.

On 31 August, Narek Petrosyan re-signed for Urartu.

On 12 September, Urartu announced the signing of Pavlo Stepanets from Ararat Yerevan.

On 29 September, the season was suspended indefinitely due to the escalating 2020 Nagorno-Karabakh conflict. On 13 October, the FFA announced that the season would resume on 17 October.

On 2 November, Urartu's game against Pyunik was postponed due to positive COVID-19 cases within the Pyunik team.

On 22 November, Urartu announced the signing of Isah Aliyu after he'd left Al-Shoulla.

On 11 January, Pavlo Stepanets left Urartu after his contract was terminated by mutual consent.

On 27 January, Robert Darbinyan left Urartu to join FC Pyunik.

On 2 February, Urartu announced the signing of Vadym Paramonov from Rukh Lviv.

On 8 February, Yevgeni Osipov left Urartu by mutual consent.

On 12 February, Urartu announced the return of Yevhen Budnik from Persita Tangerang.

On 17 February, Urartu announced the signing of Pyotr Ten from FC Minsk.

On 18 February, Igor Paderin came out of retirement to re-join Urartu, with Salomon Nirisarike joining from Pyunik the following day.

On 28 February, Urartu announced the signing of Artur Miranyan.

On 9 March, Urartu announced the departure of Aleksandr Grigoryan as Head Coach, with Tigran Yesayan being put in temporary charge.

On 9 April, David Papikyan left Urartu after his contract was terminated by mutual consent.

== Squad ==
As of match played 28 May 2021

No.	Name	Nationality	Position	Date of birth (age)	Signed from	Signed in	Contract ends	Apps.	Goals
Goalkeepers
24	Arsen Beglaryan	(Armenia)	GK	6 January 1996 (aged 25)	Dnyapro Mogilev	2020		24	0
31	Grigori Matevosyan	(Russia)	GK	9 June 1999 (aged 21)	Armavir	2020		1	0
96	Anatoliy Ayvazov	(Armenia)	GK	8 June 1996 (aged 24)	Shirak	2018		26	0
Defenders
14	Pyotr Ten	(Russia)	DF	12 July 1992 (aged 28)	Minsk	2021		16	0
18	Salomon Nirisarike	(Rwanda)	DF	23 March 1993 (aged 28)	Pyunik	2021		14	0
23	Narek Petrosyan	(Armenia)	DF	25 January 1996 (aged 25)	Academy	2020		90	0
25	Edgar Grigoryan	(Armenia)	DF	25 August 1998 (aged 22)	Academy	2019		17	0
26	Annan Mensah	(Ghana)	DF	6 June 1996 (aged 24)	Lori	2020		13	0
34	Erik Piloyan	(Armenia)	DF	29 January 2001 (aged 20)	Academy	2019		2	0
67	Vadym Paramonov	(Ukraine)	DF	18 March 1991 (aged 30)	Rukh Lviv	2021		14	1
77	Erik Simonyan	(Armenia)	DF	12 June 2003 (aged 17)	Academy	2019		5	0
88	James	(Brazil)	DF	15 July 1995 (aged 25)	Ararat Yerevan	2020		18	0
Midfielders
5	Hakob Hakobyan	(Armenia)	MF	29 March 1997 (aged 24)	Academy	2013		152	2
6	Peter Mutumosi	(Democratic Republic of the Congo)	MF	25 May 1998 (aged 23)	Motema Pembe	2019	2021	28	1
17	Tigran Ayunts	(Armenia)	MF	15 March 2000 (aged 21)	Academy	2017		2	0
20	Gor Lulukyan	(Armenia)	MF	2 January 2003 (aged 18)	Academy	2020		6	0
28	Robert Baghramyan	(Armenia)	MF	29 June 2002 (aged 18)	BKMA Yerevan	2020		3	0
30	Ugochukwu Iwu	(Nigeria)	MF	28 November 1999 (aged 21)	Lori	2020		25	2
33	Vitinho	(Brazil)	MF	8 September 1997 (aged 23)	Ararat Yerevan	2020		26	1
36	Khariton Ayvazyan	(Armenia)	MF	8 November 2003 (aged 17)	Academy	2020		8	0
38	Isah Aliyu	(Nigeria)	MF	8 August 1998 (aged 22)	Al-Shoulla	2020		16	1
90	Oleg Polyakov	(Russia)	MF	29 November 1990 (aged 30)	Armavir	2020		20	2
Forwards
8	Igor Paderin	(Russia)	FW	24 November 1989 (aged 31)	Retirement	2021		14	3
9	Yevgeni Kobzar	(Russia)	FW	9 August 1992 (aged 28)	Spartaks Jūrmala	2019		56	13
10	Karen Melkonyan	(Armenia)	FW	25 March 1999 (aged 22)	Academy	2017		89	5
11	Gevorg Tarakhchyan	(Armenia)	FW	15 March 2002 (aged 19)	Academy	2019		24	0
12	Jonel Désiré	(Haiti)	FW	12 February 1997 (aged 24)	Lori	2020		21	9
15	Abraham Portugalyan	(Armenia)	FW	8 January 1999 (aged 22)	Academy	2019		1	0
21	Erik Petrosyan	(Armenia)	FW	19 February 1998 (aged 23)	Pyunik	2018		12	3
22	Artur Miranyan	(Armenia)	FW	27 December 1995 (aged 25)	Pyunik	2021		11	3
55	Samvel Hakobyan	(Armenia)	FW	30 April 2003 (aged 18)	Academy	2020		1	0
70	Abraham Portugalyan	(Armenia)	FW	8 January 1999 (aged 22)	Academy	2020		6	1
Urartu II
1	Narek Hovhannisyan	(Armenia)	GK	11 June 2002 (aged 18)	Pyunik	2020		0	0
Players out on loan
	Hrachya Geghamyan	(Armenia)	DF	2 December 1999 (aged 21)	Academy	2018		3	0
	Arsen Sadoyan	(Armenia)	DF	16 March 1999 (aged 22)	Academy	2019		1	0
	Erik Vardanyan	(Armenia)	MF	8 February 1999 (aged 22)	Academy	2019		0	0
Players who left during the season
4	Pavlo Stepanets	(Ukraine)	MF	26 May 1987 (aged 34)	Ararat Yerevan	2020		0	0
8	Maksim Mashnev	(Russia)	MF	12 January 1993 (aged 28)	Chayka Peschanokopskoye	2020		6	0
15	Dmitry Guz	(Russia)	DF	15 May 1988 (aged 33)	Ararat-Armenia	2020		10	1
16	David Papikyan	(Armenia)	MF	8 July 2001 (aged 19)	Academy	2020		0	0
18	Aleksandr Radchenko	(Russia)	FW	14 September 1993 (aged 27)	Tekstilshchik Ivanovo	2020		7	2
19	Yevgeni Osipov	(Russia)	DF	29 October 1986 (aged 34)	FCI Levadia	2020		16	0
99	Robert Darbinyan	(Armenia)	DF	4 October 1995 (aged 25)	Ararat-Armenia	2019		36	0
99	Yevhen Budnik	(Ukraine)	FW	4 September 1990 (aged 30)	Persita Tangerang	2021		11	4
	Joseph Sunday	(Nigeria)	MF	23 February 2002 (aged 19)	loan from ?	2020	2021	2	0

=== Out on loan ===
Note: Flags indicate national team as defined under FIFA eligibility rules; some limited exceptions apply. Players may hold more than one non-FIFA nationality.

No.	Pos.	Nation	Player
—	DF	ARM	Hrachya Geghamyan (at Shirak)
—	DF	ARM	Arsen Sadoyan (at Shirak)

No.	Pos.	Nation	Player
—	MF	ARM	Erik Vardanyan (at Shirak)

== Transfers ==
=== In ===
Date	Position	Nationality	Name	From	Fee	Ref.
1 July 2020	GK	(Armenia)	Narek Hovhannisyan	Pyunik	Undisclosed	
1 July 2020	GK	(Russia)	Grigori Matevosyan	Armavir	Undisclosed	
17 July 2020	DF	(Brazil)	James	Ararat Yerevan	Undisclosed	
17 July 2020	MF	(Brazil)	Vitinho	Ararat Yerevan	Undisclosed	
21 July 2020	DF	(Russia)	Dmitry Guz	Ararat-Armenia	Free	
15 July 2020	MF	(Russia)	Maksim Mashnev	Chayka Peschanokopskoye	Undisclosed	
14 July 2020	MF	(Russia)	Oleg Polyakov	Armavir	Undisclosed	
24 July 2020	FW	(Russia)	Aleksandr Radchenko	Tekstilshchik Ivanovo	Undisclosed	
29 July 2020	DF	(Ghana)	Annan Mensah	Lori	Undisclosed	
7 August 2020	MF	(Nigeria)	Ugochukwu Iwu	Lori	Undisclosed	
8 August 2020	FW	(Haiti)	Jonel Désiré	Lori	Undisclosed	
11 August 2020	MF	(Nigeria)	Juesukobiruo Okotie	Sporting Warri	Undisclosed	
31 August 2020	DF	(Armenia)	Narek Petrosyan	Urartu	Free	
12 September 2020	MF	(Ukraine)	Pavlo Stepanets	Ararat Yerevan	Free	
22 November 2020	MF	(Nigeria)	Isah Aliyu	Al-Shoulla	Free	
2 February 2020	DF	(Ukraine)	Vadym Paramonov	Rukh Lviv	Undisclosed	
12 February 2020	FW	(Ukraine)	Yevhen Budnik	Persita Tangerang	Undisclosed	
17 February 2020	DF	(Russia)	Pyotr Ten	Minsk	Undisclosed	
18 February 2021	FW	(Russia)	Igor Paderin	Retirement	Free	
19 February 2021	DF	(Rwanda)	Salomon Nirisarike	Pyunik	Free	
28 February 2021	FW	(Armenia)	Artur Miranyan	Unattached	Free	

=== Out ===
Date	Position	Nationality	Name	To	Fee	Ref.
20 August 2020	DF	(Armenia)	Arsen Yeghiazaryan	Lori	Undisclosed	
27 January 2021	DF	(Armenia)	Robert Darbinyan	Pyunik	Undisclosed	
9 February 2021	MF	(Russia)	Maksim Mashnev	Tyumen	Undisclosed	
1 March 2020	FW	(Ukraine)	Yevhen Budnik	Pyunik	Undisclosed	

=== Loans out ===
Date	Position	Nationality	Name	From	Date to	Ref.
15 August 2020	DF	(Armenia)	Hrachya Geghamyan	Shirak	End of season	
15 August 2020	DF	(Armenia)	Arsen Sadoyan	Shirak	End of season	
15 August 2020	DF	(Armenia)	Erik Vardanyan	Shirak	End of season	

=== Released ===
Date	Position	Nationality	Name	Joined	Date	Ref
12 August 2020	DF	(Armenia)	Narek Petrosyan	Urartu	31 August 2020	
31 December 2020	DF	(Russia)	Dmitry Guz	Atyrau		
31 December 2020	MF	(Nigeria)	Joseph Sunday	Akwa United		
31 December 2020	FW	(Russia)	Aleksandr Radchenko	Dynamo Bryansk	25 February 2021	
11 January 2021	MF	(Ukraine)	Pavlo Stepanets			
8 February 2021	DF	(Russia)	Yevgeni Osipov			
9 April 2021	MF	(Armenia)	David Papikyan			

== Friendlies ==
23 July 2020	Urartu	3 – 2	Van	Yerevan
18:00 (UTC+4)	E.Grigoryan 40'; Guz 47'; Kobzar 50' (pen.)	Report	J.Gaba 31'; A.Mnatsakanyan 45+2'	Stadium: Urartu Training Centre

25 July 2020	Urartu	1 – 0	Gandzasar Kapan	Yerevan
18:00 (UTC+4)	Goal	Report		Stadium: Urartu Training Centre

30 July 2020	Urartu	v	BKMA Yerevan	Yerevan
18:00 (UTC+4)				Stadium: Urartu Training Centre
Note: Match cancelled on 30 July.

6 August 2020	Urartu	v	Pyunik	Yerevan
19:00 (UTC+4)				Stadium: Urartu Training Centre
Note: Match cancelled on 4 August.

8 August 2020	Alashkert	1 – 3	Urartu	Yerevan
18:00 (UTC+4)	Polyakov 50' (pen.), 52'; Désiré 75'	Report	Thiago Galvão 60'	Stadium: Alashkert Stadium

30 August 2020	Urartu	1 – 1	Ararat-Armenia	Yerevan
17:30 (UTC+4)	Polyakov 16' (pen.)	Report	Louis 58' (pen.)	Stadium: Urartu Training Centre

3 September 2020	Urartu	5 – 2	Sevan	Yerevan
(UTC+4)	Iwu 38', 59'; Guz 43', 59'; Radchenko 80'	Report	Ayvazyan 13'; G.Tumbaryan 75'	Stadium: Urartu Training Centre

11 October 2020	Ararat-Armenia	1 – 1	Urartu	Yerevan
14:00 (UTC+4)	Otubanjo	Report	Polyakov	Stadium: Football Academy Stadium

21 January 2021	Urartu	2 – 2	Pyunik	Yerevan
13:00 (UTC+4)	Désiré; E.Grigoryan	Report	L.Vardanyan; A.Avanesyan	Stadium: Urartu Stadium

23 January 2021	Urartu	1 – 1	Ararat Yerevan	Yerevan
(UTC+4)	Kobzar 47'	Report	Y.Magakyan 57'

28 January 2021	Alashkert	0 – 6	Urartu	Yerevan
(UTC+4)		Report	Désiré 13', 27'; James 53'; Aliyu 70'; Kobzar 75'; G.Lulukyan 89'

30 January 2021	Urartu	0 – 3	Van	Yerevan
14:00 (UTC+4)		Report	E.Simonyan 20' (o.g.); V.Ayvazyan 62'; G.Kirakosyan 67'

5 February 2021	Urartu	1 – 0	Alashkert	Yerevan
(UTC+4)	James 24'	Report		Stadium: Urartu Stadium

10 February 2021	Urartu	2 – 0	BKMA Yerevan	Yerevan
(UTC+4)	K.Melkonyan 83'; Aliyu 90' (pen.)	Report		Stadium: Urartu Stadium

15 February 2021	Urartu	1 – 0	Sevan	Yerevan
15:00 (UTC+4)	E.Grigoryan 86'	Report		Stadium: Urartu Training Ground

27 March 2021	Urartu	1 – 1	Ararat-Armenia	Yerevan
(UTC+4)	K.Melkonyan 67'	Report	Hovhannisyan 57'	Stadium: Urartu Training Centre

== Competitions ==
=== Premier League ===
==== Results summary ====
Overall								Home						Away					
Pld	W	D	L	GF	GA	GD	Pts	W	D	L	GF	GA	GD	W	D	L	GF	GA	GD
24	12	5	7	28	19	+9	41	7	1	4	14	9	+5	5	4	3	14	10	+4

Last updated: 28 May 2021.
Source: See Results

==== Results by round ====
Round	1	2	3	4	5	6	7	8	9	10	11	12	13	14	15	16	17	18	19	20	21	22	23	24	25
Ground	H	A	A	H	H	-	A	A	H	A	A	A	A	H	A	H	H	H	A	A	H	H	H	H	A
Result	W	D	W	L	W	-	D	W	L	D	L	W	L	W	L	L	D	W	W	D	W	L	W	W	W
Position	2	1	3	1	1	-	1	6	6	6	6	6	6	6	6	5	5	5	5	5	5	5	5	3	3

Updated to match(es) played on 28 May 2021. Source: See Results
A = Away; H = Home; W = Win; D = Draw; L = Loss

==== Results ====
17 August 2020 1	Urartu	3 – 0	Lori	Yerevan
19:00 (UTC+4)		Report		Stadium: Urartu Stadium
Note: Match postponed on 17 August, before being awarded to Urartu.

23 August 2020 2	Pyunik	0 – 0	Urartu	Yerevan
19:30 (UTC+4)	Arakelyan (yellow card) 24'; Malakyan (yellow card) 80'; J.Ufuoma (yellow card) 88'	Report	Désiré (yellow card) 27'; Osipov (yellow card) 82'	Stadium: Republican Stadium; Attendance: 0 Referee: Zaven Hovhannisyan
Note: Match played behind closed doors due to the COVID-19 pandemic.

13 September 2020 4	Alashkert	1 – 2	Urartu	Yerevan
19:00 (UTC+4)	Glišić 57'; Mitrevski (yellow card) 87'	Report	Désiré 9' (pen.), 70'; Vitinho (yellow card) 29'	Stadium: Urartu-1; Attendance: 0 Referee: Zaven Hovhannisyan
Note: Match played behind closed doors due to the COVID-19 pandemic.

22 September 2020 5	Urartu	0 – 3	Noah	Yerevan
19:30 (UTC+4)	Darbinyan (yellow card) 22'; Désiré (yellow card) 45'; Osipov (yellow card) 45'; Iwu (yellow card) 90'	Report	S.Gomes 40', 45'; Emsis (yellow card) 48'; Gareginyan (yellow card) 71'; B.Hovhannisyan 76'	Stadium: Urartu Stadium; Attendance: 0 Referee: Henrik Nalbandyan
Note: Match played behind closed doors due to the COVID-19 pandemic.

19 October 2020 8	Urartu	2 – 0	Van	Yerevan
19:00 (UTC+4)	Vitinho (yellow card) 7'; Désiré 23', 90+4'	Report	L.Ngavouka-Tseke (yellow card) 45'; Tenyayev (yellow card) 59'; J.Gaba (yellow card) 73'; Ebert (yellow card) 77'	Stadium: Urartu Stadium; Attendance: 0 Referee: Ashot Ghaltakchyan
Note: Match played behind closed doors due to the COVID-19 pandemic.

26 October 2020 9	Gandzasar Kapan	0 – 2	Urartu	Yerevan
15:30 (UTC+4)		Report	Désiré (yellow card) 30' (goal) 62'; Iwu 53'; Osipov (yellow card) 53'	Stadium: FFA Academy Stadium; Attendance: 0 Referee: Henrik Nalbandyan
Note: Match played behind closed doors due to the COVID-19 pandemic. Match annulled after Gandzasar Kapan dropped out of the league.

29 October 2020 10	Lori	1 – 1	Urartu	Vanadzor
15:30 (UTC+4)	Alexis 16'; R.Minasyan (yellow card) 42'	Report	Désiré 2'; H. Hakobyan (yellow card) 45'; A.Mensah (yellow card) 60'; Iwu (yellow card) 81'; Osipov (yellow card) 83'	Stadium: Vanadzor Football Academy; Attendance: 0 Referee: Artem Gasparyan
Note: Match played behind closed doors due to the COVID-19 pandemic.

22 November 2020 12	Shirak	0 – 3	Urartu	Gyumri
14:30 (UTC+4)	E.Yeghiazaryan (yellow card) 79'	Report	Kobzar 31'; P.Mutumosi (yellow card) 31'; Vitinho (yellow card) 40' (goal) 60'; Désiré 45'; T.Ayunts (yellow card) 80'	Stadium: Gyumri City Stadium; Attendance: 0 Referee: Artush Kerobyan
Note: Match played behind closed doors due to the COVID-19 pandemic.

26 November 2020 13	Urartu	1 – 2	Alashkert	Yerevan
18:00 (UTC+4)	Polyakov (yellow card) 48'; K.Ayvazyan (yellow card) 61'; Radchenko 90'	Report	Hovsepyan 19'; Thiago Galvão 20'; Honchar (yellow card) 33'; Gome (yellow card) 74'	Stadium: Urartu Stadium; Attendance: 0 Referee: Shahen Aghayan
Note: Match played behind closed doors due to the COVID-19 pandemic.

1 December 2020 14	Noah	1 – 1	Urartu	Yerevan
14:00 (UTC+4)	Mayrovich 9'; Spătaru (yellow card) 21'; Kovalenko (yellow card) 68'; H.Manga (yellow card) 87'	Report	Kobzar 30' (pen.); Radchenko (yellow card) 59'	Stadium: FFA Academy Stadium; Attendance: 0 Referee: Zaven Hovhannisyan
Note: Match played behind closed doors due to the COVID-19 pandemic.

21 February 2021 6	Ararat Yerevan	2 – 0	Urartu	Charentsavan
14:00 (UTC+4)	M.Kone 45', 65'; Malakyan (red card) 78'	Report	Vitinho (yellow card) 60'	Stadium: Charentsavan City Stadium; Attendance: 0 Referee: Henrik Nalbandyan
Note: Match played behind closed doors due to the COVID-19 pandemic.

2 March 2021 16	Ararat-Armenia	0 – 1	Urartu	Yerevan
14:00 (UTC+4)	D.Terteryan (yellow card) 43'; A.Serobyan (yellow card) 73'	Report	Paderin 49'; James (yellow card) 62'; K.Melkonyan (yellow card) 85'	Stadium: FFA Academy Stadium; Attendance: 0 Referee: Artem Gasparyan
Note: Match played behind closed doors due to the COVID-19 pandemic.

6 March 2021 17	Van	3 – 1	Urartu	Charentsavan
14:00 (UTC+4)	Va.Ayvazyan 24'; Tenyayev 27'; A.Ayvazov 78' (o.g.); R.Isaev (yellow card) 80'	Report	Iwu (yellow card) 80'; Aliyu 81'; Nirisarike (yellow card) 90+3'	Stadium: Charentsavan City Stadium; Attendance: 200; Referee: Ashot Ghaltakchyan

7 April 2021 19	Urartu	1 – 0	Ararat Yerevan	Yerevan
18:00 (UTC+4)	Désiré 48'; Paramonov (yellow card) 53'	Report	J.Bravo (yellow card) 50'	Stadium: Urartu Stadium; Attendance: 1,000; Referee: Zaven Hovhannisyan

14 April 2021 20	Alashkert	1 – 0	Urartu	Yerevan
16:30 (UTC+4)	Voskanyan (yellow card) 14'; Ingbede (yellow card) 32'; Gome (yellow card) 56' (goal) 90+2'; Hovsepyan (yellow card) 86'	Report	E.Grigoryan (yellow card) 62'	Stadium: Alashkert Stadium; Attendance: 120; Referee: Artem Gasparyan

19 April 2021 11	Urartu	0 – 1	Pyunik	Yerevan
19:00 (UTC+4)	Hakobyan (yellow card) 21'; Désiré (yellow card) 44'	Report	Tatarkov (yellow card) 82'; Higor 90'; Buchnev (yellow card) 90'	Stadium: Urartu Stadium; Attendance: 1,800; Referee: Artur Safaryan
Note: Match originally scheduled for 4 November, but postponed on 2 November due to the COVID-19 pandemic.

25 April 2021 21	Urartu	0 – 0	Ararat-Armenia	Yerevan
19:00 (UTC+4)	Ten (yellow card) 89'	Report	Bueno (yellow card) 43'; A.Serobyan (yellow card) 90+4'	Stadium: Urartu Stadium; Attendance: 1,500; Referee: Ashot Ghaltakchyan

1 May 2021 3	Urartu	1 – 0	Shirak	Yerevan
18:30 (UTC+4)	Miranyan 27'; R.Baghramyan (red card) 58'	Report	R.Mkrtchyan (yellow card) 35'; Stanojević (yellow card) 58'; V.Arzoyan (yellow card) 66'	Stadium: Urartu Stadium; Attendance: 300; Referee: Artur Safaryan

2 May 2021 22	Lori	0 – 3	Urartu	Vanadzor
(UTC+4)				Stadium: Vanadzor Football Academy
Note: Match awarded 3-0 to Ararat-Armenia.

7 May 2021 22	Shirak	1 – 1	Urartu	Gyumri
15:00 (UTC+4)	A.Aslanyan (yellow card) 63'; S.Urushanyan (yellow card) 64'; J.Avo 82'; L.Mryan (yellow card) 86'; H.Nazaryan (yellow card) 90+5'	Report	P.Mutumosi 26'	Stadium: Gyumri City Stadium; Attendance: 150; Referee: Artem Gasparyan

11 May 2021 23	Urartu	2 – 1	Van	Yerevan
19:30 (UTC+4)	A.Petrosyan 42' (o.g.); Polyakov 90'	Report	S.Adjouman 34'	Stadium: Urartu Stadium; Attendance: 1,500; Referee: Ashot Ghaltakchyan

15 May 2021 7	Urartu	1 – 2	Ararat-Armenia	Yerevan
15:00 (UTC+4)	Polyakov 36'	Report	Otubanjo 16', 82' (yellow card) 65'; Wbeymar (yellow card) 39'	Stadium: Urartu Stadium; Attendance: 500; Referee: Henrik Nalbandyan

19 May 2021 24	Urartu	1 – 0	Noah	Yerevan
19:30 (UTC+4)	Iwu 3'; E.Simonyan (yellow card) 53'; E.Grigoryan (yellow card) 76'; Beglaryan (yellow card) 90+4'; G.Tarakhchyan (yellow card) 90+5'	Report	S.Gomes (yellow card) 19'; V.Vimercati (yellow card) 45'; Emsis (yellow card) 45'; Avetisyan (yellow card) 73'; Harutyunyan (yellow card) 74' (red card) 90+6'; Titov (yellow card) 77'; Kovalenko (yellow card) 82'	Stadium: Urartu Stadium; Attendance: 1,500; Referee: Ashot Ghaltakchyan

22 May 2021 15	Urartu	2 – 0	Ararat Yerevan	Yerevan
19:30 (UTC+4)	Paramonov 33'; Miranyan 68'; Ten (yellow card) 78'; James (yellow card) 83'	Report	Z.Margaryan (yellow card) 90+4'	Stadium: Urartu Stadium; Attendance: 1,000; Referee: Artem Gasparyan

28 May 2021 25	Pyunik	0 – 1	Urartu	Yerevan
17:30 (UTC+4)	A.Avanesyan (yellow card) 90'	Report	A.Miranyan 10'	Stadium: Urartu Stadium; Referee: Ashot Ghaltakchyan

==== Table ====
Pos	Team	Pld	W	D	L	GF	GA	GD	Pts	Qualification or relegation
1	Alashkert (C)	24	13	7	4	25	15	+10	46	Qualification for the Champions League first qualifying round
2	Noah	24	12	5	7	35	20	+15	41	Qualification for the Europa Conference League first qualifying round
3	Urartu	24	12	5	7	28	19	+9	41	Qualification for the Europa Conference League first qualifying round
4	Ararat (Note: Ararat qualified for Europa Conference League first qualifying round as winners of 2020–21 Armenian Cup.)	24	11	7	6	34	18	+16	40	Qualification for the Europa Conference League first qualifying round
5	Ararat-Armenia	24	10	8	6	32	17	+15	38	
6	Van	24	9	4	11	25	30	−5	31	
7	Pyunik	24	6	7	11	20	18	+2	25	
8	Lori (Note: Round 19–27 matches involving Lori were all declared 3–0 forfeits in favor of the remaining 8 teams.)	24	7	2	15	16	44	−28	23	
9	Shirak (R)	24	2	7	15	19	53	−34	13	Relegation to First League
10	Gandzasar (R, D)	0	0	0	0	0	0	0	0	Club disqualified (Note: Gandzasar were excluded from the league On 3 November, Gandzasar Kapan announced that they were withdrawing from the League and Armenian Cup due to the ongoing financial constraints relating to the ongoing COVID-19 pandemic in Armenia and the 2020 Nagorno-Karabakh conflict.)

Source: FFA Soccerway
Rules for classification: 1) Points; 2) Play-off (only if deciding champion); 3) Matches won; 4) Head-to-head points; 5) Head-to-head matches won; 6) Head-to-head goal difference; 7) Head-to-head goals scored; 8) Head-to-head away goals scored; 9) Goal difference; 10) Goals scored.
(C) Champions; (D) Disqualified; (R) Relegated

=== Armenian Cup ===
18 September 2020 First Round 1st leg	Urartu	2 – 1	Pyunik	Yerevan
19:30 (UTC+4)	Guz 37'; James (yellow card) 41'; Darbinyan (yellow card) 50'; Radchenko 90+1'	Report	Kobyalko 3'; A.Yeoule (yellow card) 27'; S.Grigoryan (yellow card) 68'; Nirisarike (yellow card) 80'; L.Vardanyan (yellow card) 82'	Stadium: Urartu Stadium; Attendance: 150; Referee: Artem Gasparyan

25 February 2021 First Round 2nd leg	Pyunik	0 – 0	Urartu	Yerevan
14:00 (UTC+4)	Higor (yellow card) 55'	Report	Nirisarike (yellow card) 46'; Polyakov (yellow card) 69'; E.Grigoryan (red card) 90'	Stadium: Pyunik Training Centre; Attendance: 0 Referee: Henrik Nalbandyan
Note: Match played behind closed doors due to the COVID-19 pandemic.

12 March 2021 Quarterfinal 1st leg	Urartu	0 – 2	Noah	Yerevan
17:00 (UTC+4)	Tigran Ayunts (yellow card) 23'; Ten (yellow card) 76'	Report	Avetisyan 24' (pen.); Manga 25'; Saná Gomes (yellow card) 36'; Dedechko (yellow card) 65'	Stadium: Urartu Stadium; Attendance: 500; Referee: Artem Gasparyan

3 April 2021 Quarterfinal 2nd leg	Noah	2 – 2 (4 – 2 agg.)	Urartu	Yerevan
15:00 (UTC+4)	Emsis (yellow card) 36'; Dedechko 45' (red card) 60'; A.Oliveira (yellow card) 50'; Velemir (yellow card) 73'; Azarov 75'; Hovhannisyan (yellow card) 86'	Report	K.Melkonyan (yellow card) 47'; Paramonov (yellow card) 73'; A.Mensah (red card) 84'; Désiré 88'; Paderin 90' (pen.); E.Grigoryan (yellow card) 90+4'	Stadium: Avan Academy Stadium; Attendance: 300; Referee: Henrik Nalbandyan

== Statistics ==
As of match played 28 May 2021

=== Appearances and goals ===
No.	Pos	Nat	Player	Total		Premier League		Armenian Cup	
No.	Pos	Nat	Player	Apps	Goals	Apps	Goals	Apps	Goals
5	MF	(Armenia) ARM	Hakob Hakobyan	24	0	19+2	0	3	0
6	MF	(Democratic Republic of the Congo) COD	Peter Mutumosi	16	1	7+8	1	0+1	0
8	FW	(Russia) RUS	Igor Paderin	11	2	2+6	1	1+2	1
9	FW	(Russia) RUS	Yevgeni Kobzar	19	2	4+11	2	1+3	0
10	MF	(Armenia) ARM	Karen Melkonyan	20	0	11+6	0	2+1	0
11	FW	(Armenia) ARM	Gevorg Tarakhchyan	19	0	1+15	0	0+3	0
12	FW	(Haiti) HAI	Jonel Désiré	21	9	16+1	8	4	1
14	DF	(Russia) RUS	Pyotr Ten	16	0	12+1	0	3	0
15	FW	(Armenia) ARM	Abraham Portugalyan	1	0	0+1	0	0	0
17	MF	(Armenia) ARM	Tigran Ayunts	2	0	0+1	0	1	0
18	DF	(Rwanda) RWA	Salomon Nirisarike	14	0	11+1	0	2	0
20	MF	(Armenia) ARM	Gor Lulukyan	6	0	2+3	0	1	0
22	FW	(Armenia) ARM	Artur Miranyan	11	3	8+2	3	0+1	0
23	DF	(Armenia) ARM	Narek Petrosyan	2	0	0+1	0	0+1	0
24	GK	(Armenia) ARM	Arsen Beglaryan	20	0	18	0	2	0
25	DF	(Armenia) ARM	Edgar Grigoryan	17	0	13+2	0	1+1	0
26	DF	(Ghana) GHA	Annan Mensah	13	0	10+1	0	2	0
28	MF	(Armenia) ARM	Robert Baghramyan	3	0	2+1	0	0	0
30	MF	(Nigeria) NGR	Ugochukwu Iwu	25	2	21	2	4	0
31	GK	(Russia) RUS	Grigori Matevosyan	1	0	1	0	0	0
33	MF	(Brazil) BRA	Vitinho	26	1	18+4	1	4	0
34	DF	(Armenia) ARM	Erik Piloyan	2	0	0+1	0	1	0
36	MF	(Armenia) ARM	Khariton Ayvazyan	8	0	3+5	0	0	0
38	MF	(Nigeria) NGR	Isah Aliyu	16	1	3+10	1	1+2	0
67	DF	(Ukraine) UKR	Vadym Paramonov	14	1	12	1	2	0
77	DF	(Armenia) ARM	Erik Simonyan	4	0	3	0	1	0
88	DF	(Brazil) BRA	James	18	0	9+7	0	2	0
90	MF	(Russia) RUS	Oleg Polyakov	20	2	15+2	2	1+2	0
96	GK	(Armenia) ARM	Anatoliy Ayvazov	6	0	4	0	2	0
Players away on loan:
Players who left Urartu during the season:
8	MF	(Russia) RUS	Maksim Mashnev	6	0	2+4	0	0	0
15	DF	(Russia) RUS	Dmitry Guz	10	1	9	0	1	1
18	FW	(Russia) RUS	Aleksandr Radchenko	7	2	4+2	1	0+1	1
19	DF	(Russia) RUS	Yevgeni Osipov	10	0	9	0	1	0
99	DF	(Armenia) ARM	Robert Darbinyan	5	0	4	0	1	0

=== Goal scorers ===
Place	Position	Nation	Number	Name	Premier League	Armenian Cup	Total
1	FW	(Haiti)	12	Jonel Désiré	8	1	9
2	FW	(Armenia)	22	Artur Miranyan	3	0	3
3	FW	(Russia)	9	Yevgeni Kobzar	2	0	2
3	MF	(Russia)	90	Oleg Polyakov	2	0	2
3	MF	(Nigeria)	30	Ugochukwu Iwu	2	0	2
3	FW	(Russia)	18	Aleksandr Radchenko	1	1	2
3	FW	(Russia)	8	Igor Paderin	1	1	2
8	MF	(Brazil)	33	Vitinho	1	0	1
8	MF	(Nigeria)	38	Isah Aliyu	1	0	1
8	MF	(Democratic Republic of the Congo)	6	Peter Mutumosi	1	0	1
8	DF	(Ukraine)	67	Vadym Paramonov	1	0	1
8	DF	(Russia)	15	Dmitry Guz	0	1	1
8				Own goal	1	0	1
				Awarded	6	0	6
				TOTALS	30	4	34

=== Clean sheets ===
Place	Position	Nation	Number	Name	Premier League	Armenian Cup	Total
1	GK	(Armenia)	24	Arsen Beglaryan	9	0	9
2	GK	(Armenia)	96	Anatoliy Ayvazov	1	1	2
3	GK	(Russia)	31	Grigori Matevosyan	1	0	1
				TOTALS	11	1	12

=== Disciplinary record ===
Number	Nation	Position	Name	Premier League		Armenian Cup		Total	
Number	Nation	Position	Name	Booked	Sent off (straight red)	Booked	Sent off (straight red)	Booked	Sent off (straight red)
5	(Armenia)	MF	Hakob Hakobyan	2	0	0	0	2	0
6	(Democratic Republic of the Congo)	MF	Peter Mutumosi	1	0	0	0	1	0
10	(Armenia)	MF	Karen Melkonyan	1	0	1	0	2	0
11	(Armenia)	FW	Gevorg Tarakhchyan	1	0	0	0	1	0
12	(Haiti)	FW	Jonel Désiré	4	0	0	0	4	0
14	(Russia)	DF	Pyotr Ten	2	0	1	0	3	0
17	(Armenia)	MF	Tigran Ayunts	1	0	1	0	2	0
18	(Rwanda)	DF	Salomon Nirisarike	1	0	1	0	2	0
24	(Armenia)	GK	Arsen Beglaryan	1	0	0	0	1	0
25	(Armenia)	DF	Edgar Grigoryan	2	0	1	1	3	1
26	(Ghana)	DF	Annan Mensah	1	0	0	1	1	1
28	(Armenia)	MF	Robert Baghramyan	0	1	0	0	0	1
30	(Nigeria)	MF	Ugochukwu Iwu	3	0	0	0	3	0
33	(Brazil)	MF	Vitinho	4	0	0	0	4	0
36	(Armenia)	MF	Khariton Ayvazyan	1	0	0	0	1	0
67	(Ukraine)	DF	Vadym Paramonov	1	0	1	0	2	0
77	(Armenia)	DF	Erik Simonyan	1	0	0	0	1	0
88	(Brazil)	DF	James	2	0	1	0	3	0
90	(Russia)	MF	Oleg Polyakov	1	0	1	0	2	0
Players away on loan:
Players who left Urartu during the season:
18	(Russia)	FW	Aleksandr Radchenko	1	0	0	0	1	0
19	(Russia)	DF	Yevgeni Osipov	4	0	0	0	4	0
99	(Armenia)	DF	Robert Darbinyan	1	0	1	0	2	0
			TOTALS	36	1	9	2	45	3
