= 2020–21 FC Van season =

Van
2020–21 season
- Owner: Oleg Ghukasov
- Manager: Sevada Arzumanyan (until 2 February); Konstantin Zaytsev (from 2 February)
- Stadium: Charentsavan City Stadium
- Premier League: 7th
- Armenian Cup: Quarterfinals
- Top goalscorer: League: Wilfried Eza (4); All: Wilfried Eza (4)

The 2020–21 season is FC Van's 1st season in Armenian Premier League, and second in existence.

== Season events ==
On 30 July 2020, it was announced that Van had been giving a license to compete in the Armenian Premier League for the 2020–21 season. On 31 July, Van confirmed Sevada Arzumanyan as their head coach.

On 24 August, the Football Federation of Armenia announced that that day's match between Van and Lori had been postponed due to cases of COVID-19 within the Lori squad.

On 9 September, the Football Federation of Armenia announced that Van's games away to Shirak, scheduled for 11 September, had been postponed.

On 29 September, the season was suspended indefinitely due to the escalating 2020 Nagorno-Karabakh conflict.

=== Transfers ===
On the 29 July, Anushavan Tarverdyan, Arsen Kaytov, Sos Tadevosyan, Aleksandr Ladik, Batraz Tedeyev and Evgeni Gavrilov all left the club after their contracts where terminated by mutual consent.

On 30 July, Vigen Begoyan, Vardan Bakalyan and Hovhannes Ilangyozyan all had their contracts with the club terminated by mutual consent.

On 31 July, Van announced the signing of Ebert and Vahagn Ayvazyan.

On 1 August, Van announced the permanent signing of Arman Khachatryan from Ararat-Armenia, after he played for the club on loan during the 2019–20 season.

On 2 August, Deou Dosa's contract with Van was terminated by mutual consent.

On 5 August, Van announced the signing of Henri Avagyan from Alashkert, David Ghandilyan and Mihran Manasyan from Lori, and Davit Nalbandyan on loan from Ararat-Armenia.

On 9 August, Van announced the signing of Aleksandr Tenyayev.

On 21 August, Van announced the signing of Garegin Kirakosyan. On 13 October, the FFA announced that the season would resume on 17 October.

On 3 October, Van announced the signing of Orbeli Hambardzumyan from Alay Osh.

On 23 January, Van announced the departure by mutual consent of Ashot Ayvazyan, Davit Ayvazyan, Arman Khachatryan, Ebert, Michael Gnolou, Mihran Petrosyan, Lie Pato Ngavouka-Tseke, Media Traore, Muslim Bammatgereev, David Ghandilyan, Orbeli Hambardzumyan and Mihran Manasyan.

On 1 February, Van confirmed that Stanislav Yefimov had left the club after his contract had expired.

On 2 February, Van announced the appointment of Konstantin Zaytsev as their new head coach.

On 4 February, Van announced the signings of David Papikyan, Alexander Hovhannisyan, Deou Dosa, Ruslan Isaev, Vladislav Vasilyev, Maxim Zestarev and Aleksandr Maksimenko.

On 9 February, Van announced the signing of Viulen Ayvazyan from Sevan.

On 18 February, Van announced the signings of Pavel Korkin and Aleksey Shishkin.

On 4 April, Van announced Emmanuel Mireku had now joined the club having signed a contract with Van in the winter transfer window and being unable to travel to Armenia from Ghana due to the COVID-19 pandemic.

== Squad ==
As of 4 April 2021

Note: Flags indicate national team as defined under FIFA eligibility rules; some limited exceptions apply. Players may hold more than one non-FIFA nationality.

| No. | Pos. | Nation | Player |
|---|---|---|---|
| 2 | GK | RUS | Samur Agamagomedov |
| 3 | DF | ARM | Andranik Voskanyan |
| 5 | DF | RUS | Aleksandr Tenyayev |
| 6 | DF | ARM | Argishti Petrosyan |
| 7 | MF | RUS | Vladislav Vasilyev |
| 10 | FW | CIV | Wilfried Eza |
| 11 | MF | RUS | Maxim Zestarev |
| 12 | GK | ARM | Henri Avagyan |
| 13 | MF | GHA | Emmanuel Mireku |
| 14 | MF | RUS | Pavel Korkin |
| 15 | DF | NGR | Deou Dosa |
| 17 | MF | CIV | Stéphane Adjouman |

| No. | Pos. | Nation | Player |
|---|---|---|---|
| 18 | DF | ARM | Vahagn Ayvazyan |
| 20 | FW | ARM | Edgar Movsesyan |
| 22 | FW | ARM | Viulen Ayvazyan |
| 23 | DF | ARM | Alexander Hovhannisyan |
| 25 | MF | ARM | Davit Nalbandyan (on loan from Ararat-Armenia) |
| 26 | MF | NGR | Ededem Essien |
| 27 | DF | CIV | Josue Gaba |
| 28 | DF | RUS | Ruslan Isaev |
| 33 | GK | RUS | David Papikyan |
| 63 | FW | RUS | Aleksandr Maksimenko |
| 88 | MF | RUS | Aleksey Shishkin |
| 98 | MF | ARM | Garegin Kirakosyan |

== Transfers ==
=== In ===
| Date | Position | Nationality | Name | From | Fee | Ref. |
|---|---|---|---|---|---|---|
| 31 July 2020 | DF | (Armenia) | Vahagn Ayvazyan | Urartu | Free | |
| 31 July 2020 | DF | (Brazil) | Ebert | Urartu | Free | |
| 1 August 2020 | MF | (Armenia) | Arman Khachatryan | Ararat-Armenia | Undisclosed | |
| 5 August 2020 | GK | (Armenia) | Henri Avagyan | Alashkert | Undisclosed | |
| 5 August 2020 | FW | (Armenia) | David Ghandilyan | Lori | Undisclosed | |
| 5 August 2020 | FW | (Armenia) | Mihran Manasyan | Lori | Undisclosed | |
| 9 August 2020 | DF | (Russia) | Aleksandr Tenyayev | Mordovia Saransk | Undisclosed | |
| 21 August 2020 | MF | (Armenia) | Garegin Kirakosyan | Kyzyltash Bakhchisaray | Undisclosed | |
| 3 October 2020 | FW | (Armenia) | Orbeli Hambardzumyan | Alay Osh | Undisclosed | |
| 4 February 2021 | GK | (Armenia) | David Papikyan | Torpedo Yerevan | Undisclosed | |
| 4 February 2021 | DF | (Armenia) | Alexander Hovhannisyan | Gandzasar Kapan | Free | |
| 4 February 2021 | DF | (Nigeria) | Deou Dosa | Lori | Free | |
| 4 February 2021 | DF | (Russia) | Ruslan Isaev | Anzhi Makhachkala | Undisclosed | |
| 4 February 2021 | MF | (Russia) | Vladislav Vasilyev | Spartak-2 Moscow | Undisclosed | |
| 4 February 2021 | MF | (Russia) | Maxim Zestarev | Ural Yekaterinburg | Undisclosed | |
| 4 February 2021 | FW | (Russia) | Aleksandr Maksimenko | SKA-Khabarovsk | Undisclosed | |
| 9 February 2021 | FW | (Armenia) | Viulen Ayvazyan | Sevan | Undisclosed | |
| 18 February 2021 | MF | (Russia) | Pavel Korkin | Unattached | Free | |
| 18 February 2021 | MF | (Russia) | Aleksey Shishkin | Unattached | Free | |
| 4 April 2021 | MF | (Ghana) | Emmanuel Mireku | Unattached | Free | |

=== Loans in ===
| Date from | Position | Nationality | Name | From | Date to | Ref. |
|---|---|---|---|---|---|---|
| 5 August 2020 | MF | (Armenia) | Davit Nalbandyan | Ararat-Armenia | End of season | |

=== Released ===
| Date | Position | Nationality | Name | Joined | Date | Ref. |
|---|---|---|---|---|---|---|
| 29 July 2020 | GK | (Armenia) | Anushavan Tarverdyan | Sevan | | |
| 29 July 2020 | DF | (Russia) | Arsen Kaytov | Lernayin Artsakh | | |
| 29 July 2020 | MF | (Armenia) | Sos Tadevosyan | | | |
| 29 July 2020 | MF | (Russia) | Aleksandr Ladik | | | |
| 29 July 2020 | MF | (Russia) | Batraz Tedeyev | Lernayin Artsakh | | |
| 29 July 2020 | FW | (Russia) | Evgeni Gavrilov | | | |
| 30 July 2020 | MF | (Armenia) | Vigen Begoyan | Noravank | | |
| 30 July 2020 | FW | (Armenia) | Vardan Bakalyan | Shirak | 27 July 2020 | |
| 30 July 2020 | FW | (Armenia) | Hovhannes Ilangyozyan | | | |
| 31 July 2020 | FW | (Armenia) | Ghukas Poghosyan | Alashkert | 17 September 2020 | |
| 2 August 2020 | DF | (Nigeria) | Deou Dosa | Lori | 10 September 2020 | |
| 23 January 2021 | GK | (Armenia) | Ashot Ayvazyan | | | |
| 23 January 2021 | DF | (Armenia) | Davit Ayvazyan | Sevan | | |
| 23 January 2021 | DF | (Armenia) | Arman Khachatryan | Noravank | | |
| 23 January 2021 | DF | (Brazil) | Ebert | Metal Kharkiv | | |
| 23 January 2021 | DF | (Ivory Coast) | Michael Gnolou | | | |
| 23 January 2021 | MF | (Armenia) | Mihran Petrosyan | | | |
| 23 January 2021 | FW | (Republic of the Congo) | Lie Pato Ngavouka-Tseke | | | |
| 23 January 2021 | FW | (Ivory Coast) | Media Traore | | | |
| 23 January 2021 | FW | (Russia) | Muslim Bammatgereev | Krasny | | |
| 23 January 2021 | FW | (Armenia) | David Ghandilyan | Noravank | | |
| 23 January 2021 | FW | (Armenia) | Orbeli Hambardzumyan | | | |
| 23 January 2021 | FW | (Armenia) | Mihran Manasyan | Alashkert | 21 February 2021 | |
| 1 February 2021 | MF | (Russia) | Stanislav Yefimov | Ekenäs | 17 February 2021 | |
| 30 June 2021 | GK | (Armenia) | Henri Avagyan | Noravank | 28 January 2022 | |
| 30 June 2021 | DF | (Russia) | Rustam Isaev | | | |
| 30 June 2021 | MF | (Armenia) | Garegin Kirakosyan | | | |
| 30 June 2021 | MF | (Russia) | Pavel Korkin | | | |
| 30 June 2021 | MF | (Russia) | Vladislav Vasilyev | Druzhba Maykop | | |
| 30 June 2021 | MF | (Russia) | Maxim Zestarev | | | |
| 30 June 2021 | FW | (Armenia) | Viulen Ayvazyan | | | |

== Friendlies ==
| 23 July 2020 | Urartu | 3 – 2 | Van | Yerevan |
| 18:00 (UTC+4) | E.Grigoryan 40'; Guz 47'; Kobzar 50' (pen.) | Report | J.Gaba 31'; A.Mnatsakanyan 45+2' | Stadium: Urartu Training Centre |

| 28 July 2020 | Alashkert | 0 – 1 | Van | Yerevan |
| 18:00 (UTC+4) | | Report | Goal | Stadium: Yerevan Football Academy Stadium |

| 1 August 2020 | Van | 4 – 0 | West Armenia | Charentsavan |
| 18:00 (UTC+4) | Goal | Report | | Stadium: Charentsavan City Stadium |

| 6 August 2020 | Pyunik | 2 – 4 | Van | Dilijan |
| 12:00 (UTC+4) | Goal | Report | V.Ayvazyan; M.Manasyan |

| 5 September 2020 | Alashkert | 2 – 1 | Van | Yerevan |
| 12:00 (UTC+4) | Glišić; Aghekyan | Report | Goal | Stadium: Alashkert Stadium |

| 30 January 2021 | Urartu | 0 – 3 | Van | Yerevan |
| 14:00 (UTC+4) | | Report | E.Simonyan 20' (o.g.); V.Ayvazyan 62'; G.Kirakosyan 67' |

| 2 February 2021 | Van | 1 – 0 | Alashkert | Charentsavan |
| (UTC+4) | G.Kirakosyan | Report | | Stadium: Charentsavan City Stadium |

| 6 February 2021 | BKMA Yerevan | 3 – 1 | Van | Yerevan |
| 14:00 (UTC+4) | Goal | Report | Goal | Stadium: Yerevan Football Academy Stadium |

| 9 February 2021 | Van | 2 – 1 | Noravank | Charentsavan |
| 14:00 (UTC+4) | Goal | Report | Goal | Stadium: Charentsavan City Stadium |

| 13 February 2021 | Van | 1 – 3 | Lori | Charentsavan |
| 14:00 (UTC+4) | G.Kirakosyan | Report | Goal | Stadium: Charentsavan City Stadium |

| 25 March 2021 | Van | 2 – 3 | Noravank | Charentsavan |
| 14:00 (UTC+4) | Goal | Report | Goal | Stadium: Charentsavan City Stadium |

== Competitions ==
=== Premier League ===
==== Results summary ====
| Overall | | | | | | | | Home | | | | | | Away | | | | | |
| Pld | W | D | L | GF | GA | GD | Pts | W | D | L | GF | GA | GD | W | D | L | GF | GA | GD |
|---|---|---|---|---|---|---|---|---|---|---|---|---|---|---|---|---|---|---|---|
| 24 | 9 | 4 | 11 | 25 | 30 | −5 | 31 | 5 | 1 | 6 | 15 | 13 | +2 | 4 | 3 | 5 | 10 | 17 | −7 |

Last updated: 28 May 2021.
Source: See Results

==== Results by round ====
| Round | 1 | 2 | 3 | 4 | 5 | 6 | 7 | 8 | 9 | 10 | 11 | 12 | 13 | 14 | 15 | 16 | 17 | 18 | 19 | 20 | 21 | 22 | 23 | 24 | 25 |
|---|---|---|---|---|---|---|---|---|---|---|---|---|---|---|---|---|---|---|---|---|---|---|---|---|---|
| Ground | - | H | A | H | A | H | - | H | A | H | A | H | H | A | A | A | H | A | A | A | H | A | H | A | H |
| Result | - | W | W | L | L | L | - | L | D | W | L | L | L | L | D | D | W | L | W | W | D | L | W | W | W |
| Position | - | 1 | 1 | 2 | 2 | 7 | - | 7 | 7 | 7 | 7 | 7 | 7 | 7 | 7 | 7 | 7 | 7 | 6 | 6 | 6 | 6 | 6 | 6 | 6 |

Updated to match(es) played on 28 May 2021. Source: See Results
A = Away; H = Home; W = Win; D = Draw; L = Loss

==== Results ====
| 15 August 2020 1 | Van | 2 – 1 | Gandzasar Kapan | Charentsavan |
| 17:30 (UTC+4) | Eza 19' (pen.) (yellow card) 27'; M.Manasyan 68' | Report | A.Zoko (yellow card) 12'; Harutyunyan 27' (pen.) | Stadium: Charentsavan City Stadium; Attendance: 0 Referee: Zaven Hovhannisyan |
Note: Match played behind closed doors due to the COVID-19 pandemic. Match annulled after Gandzasar Kapan dropped out of the league.

| 29 August 2020 3 | Van | 1 – 0 | Pyunik | Charentsavan |
| 16:45 (UTC+4) | Eza 43' | Report | A.Avanesyan (yellow card) 75'; Özbiliz (yellow card) 90+3' | Stadium: Charentsavan City Stadium; Attendance: 0 Referee: Ashot Ghaltakchyan |
Note: Match played behind closed doors due to the COVID-19 pandemic.

| 15 September 2020 2 | Lori | 0 – 1 | Van | Vanadzor |
| 17:00 (UTC+4) | Alexis (yellow card) 5'; A.Avagyan (yellow card) 63'; Fernandinho (yellow card) 74'; Rudoselskiy (yellow card) 90+4' | Report | Ebert (yellow card) 12'; Tenyayev (yellow card) 51'; L.Ngavouka-Tseke (yellow card) 56'; E.Essien (yellow card) 65'; A.Petrosyan (yellow card) 73'; J.Gaba (yellow card) 88'; E.Movsesyan 90+2' (yellow card) 90+4' | Stadium: Vanadzor Football Academy; Attendance: 0 Referee: Henrik Nalbandyan |
Note: Match originally scheduled for 23 August, but postponed on 24 August. Match played behind closed doors due to the COVID-19 pandemic.

| 24 September 2020 5 | Van | 0 – 1 | Alashkert | Charentsavan |
| 16:30 (UTC+4) | J.Gaba (yellow card) 36'; M.Bammatgereev (yellow card) 56'; A.Petrosyan (yellow card) 76' | Report | Daghbashyan (red card) 44'; D.Davidyan 61'; Čančarević (yellow card) 87'; Gome (yellow card) 90+4' | Stadium: Charentsavan City Stadium; Attendance: 0 Referee: Artem Gasparyan |

| 19 October 2020 8 | Urartu | 2 – 0 | Van | Yerevan |
| 19:00 (UTC+4) | Vitinho (yellow card) 7'; Désiré 23', 90+4' | Report | L.Ngavouka-Tseke (yellow card) 45'; Tenyayev (yellow card) 59'; J.Gaba (yellow card) 73'; Ebert (yellow card) 77' | Stadium: Urartu Stadium; Attendance: 0 Referee: Ashot Ghaltakchyan |
Note: Match played behind closed doors due to the COVID-19 pandemic.

| 25 October 2020 9 | Van | 0 – 1 | Ararat-Armenia | Charentsavan |
| 16:00 (UTC+4) | Eza (yellow card) 80' | Report | Mailson 55'; Abakumov (yellow card) 90+4' | Stadium: Charentsavan City Stadium; Attendance: 0 Referee: Zaven Hovhannisyan |
Note: Match played behind closed doors due to the COVID-19 pandemic.

| 31 October 2020 10 | Gandzasar Kapan | 1 – 3 | Van | Yerevan |
| 19:30 (UTC+4) | D.Terteryan (yellow card) 8'; R.Krusnauskas 27'; Adah (yellow card) 61' | Report | M.Bammatgereev 9' (pen.); M.Petrosyan (yellow card) 17'; Tenyayev (yellow card) 39'; J.Gaba (yellow card) 58'; Yefimov 75' (pen.); G.Kirakosyan (yellow card) 82'; Eza 90'; M.Traore (yellow card) 90+5' | Stadium: Football Academy Stadium; Attendance: 0 Referee: Henrik Nalbandyan |
Note: Match played behind closed doors due to the COVID-19 pandemic. Match annulled after Gandzasar Kapan dropped out of the league.

| 4 November 2020 11 | Van | 1 – 2 | Lori | Charentsavan |
| 15:30 (UTC+4) | M.Petrosyan 37'; Tenyayev (yellow card) 90' | Report | A.Kocharyan (yellow card) 36'; Alexis (yellow card) 50'; Claudir 71', 80'; N.Antwi (yellow card) 90+2' | Stadium: Charentsavan City Stadium; Attendance: 0 Referee: Zaven Hovhannisyan |
Note: Match played behind closed doors due to the COVID-19 pandemic.

| 21 November 2020 12 | Pyunik | 0 – 0 | Van | Yerevan |
| 18:00 (UTC+4) | | Report | V.Ayvazyan (yellow card) 55'; Ebert (yellow card) 85'; E.Movsesyan (yellow card) 88' | Stadium: Republican Stadium; Attendance: 0 Referee: Shahen Aghayan |
Note: Match played behind closed doors due to the COVID-19 pandemic.

| 26 November 2020 13 | Van | 3 – 1 | Shirak | Charentsavan |
| 14:30 (UTC+4) | M.Manasyan 24'; Va.Ayvazyan (yellow card) 50'; Eza 71'; E.Movsesyan 81' | Report | A.Muradyan 37'; A.Davoyan (yellow card) 50' | Stadium: Charentsavan City Stadium; Attendance: 0 Referee: Ashot Ghaltakchyan |
Note: Match played behind closed doors due to the COVID-19 pandemic.

| 30 November 2020 14 | Alashkert | 2 – 1 | Van | Yerevan |
| 14:00 (UTC+4) | Glišić (yellow card) 24' (goal) 36' (pen.); D.Davidyan 69' | Report | Tenyayev (yellow card) 35'; G.Kirakosyan 75' | Stadium: Alashkert Stadium; Attendance: 0 Referee: Artem Gasparyan |
Note: Match played behind closed doors due to the COVID-19 pandemic.

| 5 December 2020 15 | Van | 0 – 1 | Noah | Charentsavan |
| 14:00 (UTC+4) | A.Petrosyan (yellow card) 68'; G.Kirakosyan (yellow card) 82' | Report | Mayrovich 27'; Emsis (yellow card) 58'; Spătaru (yellow card) 90+2'; A.Mkrtchyan (yellow card) 90+5' | Stadium: Charentsavan City Stadium; Attendance: 0 Referee: Artak Simonyan |
Note: Match played behind closed doors due to the COVID-19 pandemic.

| 10 December 2020 7 | Van | 0 – 1 | Ararat Yerevan | Charentsavan |
| 14:00 (UTC+4) | Ebert (yellow card) 39' | Report | Nenadović 40'; Badoyan (yellow card) 90'; V.Yermakov (yellow card) 90' | Stadium: Charentsavan City Stadium; Attendance: 0 Referee: Henrik Nalbandyan |
Note: Match played behind closed doors due to the COVID-19 pandemic.

| 19 February 2021 6 | Noah | 4 – 0 | Van | Yerevan |
| 14:00 (UTC+4) | Azarov 9' (pen.); A.Oliveira 52'; Kireyenko 54' (pen.); Paireli 63' (pen.) | Report | E.Essien (yellow card) 30'; Va.Ayvazyan (yellow card) 42'; Voskanyan (yellow card) 45' | Stadium: Pyunik Training Centre; Referee: Artur Safaryan |

| 24 February 2021 4 | Shirak | 0 – 0 | Van | Gyumri |
| 18:00 (UTC+4) | P.Afajanyan (yellow card) 26'; Y.Silue (yellow card) 33' | Report | Voskanyan (yellow card) 29' | Stadium: Gyumri City Stadium; Attendance: 0 Referee: Gevorg Eghoyan |
Note: Match originally scheduled for 11 September, but postponed on 9 September. Match played behind closed doors due to the COVID-19 pandemic.

| 1 March 2021 16 | Ararat Yerevan | 0 – 0 | Van | Yerevan |
| 15:30 (UTC+4) | | Report | Avagyan (red card) 76'; D.Nalbandyan (yellow card) 90+6' | Stadium: Republican Stadium; Attendance: 100; Referee: Zaven Hovhannisyan |

| 6 March 2021 17 | Van | 3 – 1 | Urartu | Charentsavan |
| 14:00 (UTC+4) | Va.Ayvazyan 24'; Tenyayev 27'; A.Ayvazov 78' (o.g.); R.Isaev (yellow card) 80' | Report | U.Iwu (yellow card) 80'; Aliyu 81'; Nirisarike (yellow card) 90+3' | Stadium: Charentsavan City Stadium; Attendance: 200; Referee: Ashot Ghaltakchyan |

| 18 March 2021 18 | Ararat-Armenia | 3 – 0 | Van | Yerevan |
| 16:00 (UTC+4) | Tenyayev 12' (o.g.); Otubanjo 24', 83'; Sanogo (red card) 61'; Bueno (yellow card) 77' | Report | Va.Ayvazyan (yellow card) 42' | Stadium: FFA Academy Stadium; Attendance: 100; Referee: Henrik Nalbandyan |

| 8 April 2021 19 | Ararat-Armenia | 2 – 3 | Van | Yerevan |
| 15:00 (UTC+4) | Karapetian 34'; Wbeymar (yellow card) 17'; Otubanjo 90+4' | Report | S.Adjouman 4' (yellow card) 47'; Tenyayev 50'; D.Dosa (yellow card) 78'; E.Movsesyan 88' | Stadium: FFA Academy Stadium; Attendance: 150; Referee: Henrik Nalbandyan |

| 14 April 2021 20 | Van | 0 – 3 | Pyunik | Charentsavan |
| 14:30 (UTC+4) | D.Dosa (red card) 29'; Voskanyan (yellow card) 66'; E.Mireku (yellow card) 75' | Report | Arakelyan 31'; Tatarkov (yellow card) 51'; Higor 82'; Caraballo 85'; Salou (yellow card) 89' | Stadium: Charentsavan City Stadium; Attendance: 300; Referee: Artur Tavakalyan |

| 23 April 2021 21 | Shirak | 1 – 2 | Van | Gyumri |
| 16:00 (UTC+4) | Stanojević 15'; J.Avo (yellow card) 34'; L.Mryan (yellow card) 75' | Report | S.Adjouman 21'; Va.Ayvazyan (yellow card) 36'; A.Petrosyan (yellow card) 48'; Eza (yellow card) 62' (goal) 81' (pen.) | Stadium: Gyumri City Stadium; Attendance: 300; Referee: Zaven Hovhannisyan |

| 5 May 2021 22 | Van | 1 – 1 | Ararat Yerevan | Charentsavan |
| 16:00 (UTC+4) | E.Essien (yellow card) 26'; Eza 41'; S.Agamagomedov (yellow card) 66'; D.Dosa (yellow card) 67' | Report | Nenadović 21'; Khurtsidze (yellow card) 60' | Stadium: Charentsavan City Stadium; Attendance: 300; Referee: Henrik Nalbandyan |

| 11 May 2021 23 | Urartu | 2 – 1 | Van | Yerevan |
| 19:30 (UTC+4) | A.Petrosyan 42' (o.g.); Polyakov 90' | Report | S.Adjouman 34' | Stadium: Urartu Stadium; Attendance: 1,500; Referee: Ashot Ghaltakchyan |

| 19 May 2021 24 | Van | 3 – 1 | Alashkert | Charentsavan |
| 15:30 (UTC+4) | E.Essien (yellow card) 38'; Eza 51', 63'; Va.Ayvazyan 53' | Report | Gome 71'; Grigoryan (yellow card) 78' | Stadium: Charentsavan City Stadium; Attendance: 400; Referee: Artem Gasparyan |

| 28 May 2021 25 | Noah | 1 – 2 | Van | Yerevan |
| 17:30 (UTC+4) | S.Gomes (yellow card) 45'; Avetisyan 67'; Monroy (yellow card) 85'; Emsis (yellow card) 86'; Kovalenko (yellow card) 90+6' | Report | Va.Ayvazyan (yellow card) 18'; D.Dosa 80'; E.Movsesyan 87' (yellow card) 87' | Stadium: FFA Academy Stadium; Attendance: 1,000; Referee: Zaven Hovhannisyan |

| 30 May 2021 26 | Van | 3 – 0 | Lori | Yerevan |
| 12:00 (UTC+4) | | Report | | Stadium: FFA Academy Stadium |
Note: Match awarded 3-0 to Van.

==== Table ====
| Pos | Team | Pld | W | D | L | GF | GA | GD | Pts | Qualification or relegation |
|---|---|---|---|---|---|---|---|---|---|---|
| 1 | Alashkert (C) | 24 | 13 | 7 | 4 | 25 | 15 | +10 | 46 | Qualification for the Champions League first qualifying round |
| 2 | Noah | 24 | 12 | 5 | 7 | 35 | 20 | +15 | 41 | Qualification for the Europa Conference League first qualifying round |
| 3 | Urartu | 24 | 12 | 5 | 7 | 28 | 19 | +9 | 41 | Qualification for the Europa Conference League first qualifying round |
| 4 | Ararat (Note: Ararat qualified for Europa Conference League first qualifying round as winners of 2020–21 Armenian Cup.) | 24 | 11 | 7 | 6 | 34 | 18 | +16 | 40 | Qualification for the Europa Conference League first qualifying round |
| 5 | Ararat-Armenia | 24 | 10 | 8 | 6 | 32 | 17 | +15 | 38 | |
| 6 | Van | 24 | 9 | 4 | 11 | 25 | 30 | −5 | 31 | |
| 7 | Pyunik | 24 | 6 | 7 | 11 | 20 | 18 | +2 | 25 | |
| 8 | Lori (Note: Round 19–27 matches involving Lori were all declared 3–0 forfeits in favor of the remaining 8 teams.) | 24 | 7 | 2 | 15 | 16 | 44 | −28 | 23 | |
| 9 | Shirak (R) | 24 | 2 | 7 | 15 | 19 | 53 | −34 | 13 | Relegation to First League |
| 10 | Gandzasar (R, D) | 0 | 0 | 0 | 0 | 0 | 0 | 0 | 0 | Club disqualified (Note: Gandzasar were excluded from the league On 3 November, Gandzasar Kapan announced that they were withdrawing from the League and Armenian Cup due to the ongoing financial constraints relating to the ongoing COVID-19 pandemic in Armenia and the 2020 Nagorno-Karabakh conflict.) |

Source: FFA Soccerway
Rules for classification: 1) Points; 2) Play-off (only if deciding champion); 3) Matches won; 4) Head-to-head points; 5) Head-to-head matches won; 6) Head-to-head goal difference; 7) Head-to-head goals scored; 8) Head-to-head away goals scored; 9) Goal difference; 10) Goals scored.
(C) Champions; (D) Disqualified; (R) Relegated

=== Armenian Cup ===
| 18 September 2020 First Round 1st leg | Van | 0 – 0 | Noravank | Charentsavan |
| 16:30 (UTC+4) | A.Khachatryan (yellow card) 67'; S.Adjouman (yellow card) 81' | Report | | Stadium: Charentsavan City Stadium; Attendance: 100; Referee: Artak Simonyan |

| 9 November 2020 First Round 2nd leg | Noravank | 0 – 2 (0 – 2 agg.) | Van | Charentsavan |
| 14:30 (UTC+4) | D.Quaye (yellow card) 60' | Report | M.Gnolou (yellow card) 64'; M.Manasyan 76'; Yefimov 83' | Stadium: Charentsavan City Stadium; Attendance: 0 Referee: Artak Simonyan |

| 12 March 2021 Quarterfinal 1st leg | Van | 0–1 | Ararat-Armenia | Charentsavan |
| 14:00 (UTC+4) | Deou Dosa (yellow card) 45'; Aleksey Shishkin (yellow card) 71'; Argishti Petrosyan (yellow card) 90' | Report | Khachumyan (yellow card) 29'; Sanogo 74' | Stadium: Charentsavan City Stadium; Referee: Zaven Hovhannisyan |

| 4 April 2021 Quarterfinal 2nd leg | Ararat-Armenia | 0–1 (a.e.t.) (1–1 agg.) (5 – 4 p) | Van | Yerevan |
| 15:00 (UTC+4) | Vakulenko (yellow card) 70' | Report | D.Dosa (yellow card) 67'; E.Movsesyan 90'; E.Mireku (yellow card) 116' | Stadium: FFA Academy Stadium; Referee: Ashot Ghaltakchyan |
| | Penalties |
| | Alemão (penalty scored); Wbeymar (penalty scored); Ambartsumyan (penalty scored); Vakulenko (penalty scored); Karapetian (penalty scored) | | (penalty scored) Voskanyan; (penalty scored) Vi.Ayvazyan; (penalty scored) Tenyayev; (penalty missed) G.Kirakosyan |

== Statistics ==
As of match played 28 May 2021

=== Appearances and goals ===
| No. | Pos | Nat | Player | Total | | Premier League | | Armenian Cup | |
| No. | Pos | Nat | Player | Apps | Goals | Apps | Goals | Apps | Goals |
|---|---|---|---|---|---|---|---|---|---|
| 2 | GK | (Russia) RUS | Samur Agamagomedov | 20 | 0 | 15+2 | 0 | 3 | 0 |
| 3 | DF | (Armenia) ARM | Andranik Voskanyan | 28 | 0 | 24+1 | 0 | 3 | 0 |
| 5 | DF | (Russia) RUS | Aleksandr Tenyayev | 26 | 2 | 20+2 | 2 | 4 | 0 |
| 6 | DF | (Armenia) ARM | Argishti Petrosyan | 24 | 0 | 22 | 0 | 2 | 0 |
| 7 | MF | (Russia) RUS | Vladislav Vasilyev | 13 | 0 | 11+1 | 0 | 1 | 0 |
| 9 | MF | (Armenia) ARM | Garegin Kirakosyan | 22 | 1 | 4+14 | 1 | 1+3 | 0 |
| 10 | FW | (Ivory Coast) CIV | Wilfried Eza | 26 | 8 | 19+3 | 8 | 2+2 | 0 |
| 11 | MF | (Russia) RUS | Maxim Zestarev | 1 | 0 | 0+1 | 0 | 0 | 0 |
| 12 | GK | (Armenia) ARM | Henri Avagyan | 10 | 0 | 9 | 0 | 1 | 0 |
| 13 | MF | (Ghana) GHA | Emmanuel Mireku | 7 | 0 | 2+4 | 0 | 0+1 | 0 |
| 14 | MF | (Russia) RUS | Pavel Korkin | 1 | 0 | 0+1 | 0 | 0 | 0 |
| 15 | DF | (Nigeria) NGR | Deou Dosa | 12 | 1 | 9+1 | 1 | 2 | 0 |
| 17 | MF | (Ivory Coast) CIV | Stéphane Adjouman | 16 | 3 | 11+2 | 3 | 1+2 | 0 |
| 18 | DF | (Armenia) ARM | Vahagn Ayvazyan | 23 | 2 | 17+4 | 2 | 2 | 0 |
| 20 | FW | (Armenia) ARM | Edgar Movsesyan | 29 | 5 | 11+14 | 4 | 2+2 | 1 |
| 22 | FW | (Armenia) ARM | Viulen Ayvazyan | 7 | 0 | 3+3 | 0 | 0+1 | 0 |
| 23 | DF | (Armenia) ARM | Alexander Hovhannisyan | 10 | 0 | 7+2 | 0 | 1 | 0 |
| 25 | MF | (Armenia) ARM | Davit Nalbandyan | 6 | 0 | 0+4 | 0 | 0+2 | 0 |
| 26 | MF | (Nigeria) NGR | Ededem Essien | 28 | 0 | 24+1 | 0 | 3 | 0 |
| 27 | DF | (Ivory Coast) CIV | Josue Gaba | 14 | 0 | 10+2 | 0 | 1+1 | 0 |
| 28 | DF | (Russia) RUS | Ruslan Isaev | 8 | 0 | 6+1 | 0 | 1 | 0 |
| 63 | FW | (Russia) RUS | Aleksandr Maksimenko | 11 | 0 | 2+7 | 0 | 1+1 | 0 |
| 88 | MF | (Russia) RUS | Aleksey Shishkin | 12 | 0 | 7+3 | 0 | 2 | 0 |
Players away on loan:
Players who left Van during the season:
| 4 | MF | (Ivory Coast) CIV | Media Traore | 4 | 0 | 0+3 | 0 | 0+1 | 0 |
| 7 | DF | (Brazil) BRA | Ebert | 15 | 0 | 12+1 | 0 | 2 | 0 |
| 8 | MF | (Armenia) ARM | Davit Ayvazyan | 3 | 0 | 0+1 | 0 | 1+1 | 0 |
| 9 | FW | (Armenia) ARM | Mihran Manasyan | 10 | 2 | 3+6 | 2 | 1 | 0 |
| 11 | FW | (Armenia) ARM | David Ghandilyan | 8 | 0 | 0+7 | 0 | 1 | 0 |
| 13 | MF | (Russia) RUS | Stanislav Yefimov | 14 | 2 | 5+7 | 1 | 2 | 1 |
| 14 | DF | (Armenia) ARM | Arman Khachatryan | 2 | 0 | 0+1 | 0 | 1 | 0 |
| 21 | MF | (Russia) RUS | Muslim Bammatgereev | 15 | 1 | 13 | 1 | 1+1 | 0 |
| 22 | DF | (Ivory Coast) CIV | Michael Gnolou | 2 | 0 | 0+1 | 0 | 1 | 0 |
| 25 | FW | (Armenia) ARM | Orbeli Hambardzumyan | 1 | 0 | 0+1 | 0 | 0 | 0 |
| 88 | MF | (Armenia) ARM | Mihran Petrosyan | 11 | 1 | 2+7 | 1 | 1+1 | 0 |
| 91 | MF | (Republic of the Congo) CGO | Lie Pato Ngavouka-Tseke | 8 | 0 | 6+2 | 0 | 0 | 0 |

=== Goal scorers ===
| Place | Position | Nation | Number | Name | Premier League | Armenian Cup | Total |
|---|---|---|---|---|---|---|---|
| 1 | FW | (Ivory Coast) | 10 | Wilfried Eza | 8 | 0 | 8 |
| 2 | FW | (Armenia) | 20 | Edgar Movsesyan | 4 | 1 | 5 |
| 3 | MF | (Ivory Coast) | 17 | Stéphane Adjouman | 3 | 0 | 3 |
| 3 | FW | (Armenia) | 9 | Mihran Manasyan | 2 | 1 | 3 |
| 5 | DF | (Russia) | 5 | Aleksandr Tenyayev | 2 | 0 | 2 |
| 5 | DF | (Armenia) | 18 | Vahagn Ayvazyan | 2 | 0 | 2 |
| 5 | MF | (Russia) | 13 | Stanislav Yefimov | 1 | 1 | 2 |
| 8 | MF | (Russia) | 21 | Muslim Bammatgereev | 1 | 0 | 1 |
| 8 | MF | (Armenia) | 88 | Mihran Petrosyan | 1 | 0 | 1 |
| 8 | MF | (Armenia) | 98 | Garegin Kirakosyan | 1 | 0 | 1 |
| 8 | DF | (Nigeria) | 15 | Deou Dosa | 1 | 0 | 1 |
| 8 | | | | Own goal | 1 | 0 | 1 |
| | | | | Awarded | 3 | 0 | 3 |
| | | | | TOTALS | 30 | 3 | 33 |

=== Clean sheets ===
| Place | Position | Nation | Number | Name | Premier League | Armenian Cup | Total |
|---|---|---|---|---|---|---|---|
| 1 | GK | (Russia) | 2 | Samur Agamagomedov | 4 | 2 | 6 |
| 2 | GK | (Armenia) | 12 | Henri Avagyan | 2 | 1 | 3 |
| | | | | TOTALS | 5 | 3 | 8 |

Avagyan & Agamagomedov both played in Van's 0-0 draw with Ararat Yerevan on 1 March 2021

=== Disciplinary record ===
| Number | Nation | Position | Name | Premier League | | Armenian Cup | | Total | |
| Number | Nation | Position | Name | Booked | Sent off (straight red) | Booked | Sent off (straight red) | Booked | Sent off (straight red) |
| 2 | (Russia) | GK | Samur Agamagomedov | 1 | 0 | 0 | 0 | 1 | 0 |
| 3 | (Armenia) | DF | Andranik Voskanyan | 3 | 0 | 0 | 0 | 3 | 0 |
| 5 | (Russia) | DF | Aleksandr Tenyayev | 5 | 0 | 0 | 0 | 5 | 0 |
| 6 | (Armenia) | DF | Argishti Petrosyan | 4 | 0 | 1 | 0 | 5 | 0 |
| 10 | (Ivory Coast) | FW | Wilfried Eza | 3 | 0 | 0 | 0 | 3 | 0 |
| 12 | (Armenia) | GK | Henri Avagyan | 0 | 1 | 0 | 0 | 0 | 1 |
| 13 | (Ghana) | MF | Emmanuel Mireku | 1 | 0 | 1 | 0 | 2 | 0 |
| 15 | (Nigeria) | DF | Deou Dosa | 2 | 1 | 2 | 0 | 4 | 1 |
| 17 | (Ivory Coast) | MF | Stéphane Adjouman | 1 | 0 | 1 | 0 | 2 | 0 |
| 18 | (Armenia) | DF | Vahagn Ayvazyan | 6 | 0 | 0 | 0 | 6 | 0 |
| 20 | (Armenia) | FW | Edgar Movsesyan | 3 | 0 | 0 | 0 | 3 | 0 |
| 25 | (Armenia) | MF | Davit Nalbandyan | 1 | 0 | 0 | 0 | 1 | 0 |
| 26 | (Nigeria) | MF | Ededem Essien | 4 | 0 | 0 | 0 | 4 | 0 |
| 27 | (Ivory Coast) | DF | Josue Gaba | 4 | 0 | 0 | 0 | 4 | 0 |
| 28 | (Russia) | DF | Ruslan Isaev | 1 | 0 | 0 | 0 | 1 | 0 |
| 98 | (Armenia) | MF | Garegin Kirakosyan | 2 | 0 | 0 | 0 | 2 | 0 |
Players who left Van during the season:
| 4 | (Ivory Coast) | MF | Media Traore | 1 | 0 | 0 | 0 | 1 | 0 |
| 7 | (Brazil) | DF | Ebert | 4 | 0 | 0 | 0 | 4 | 0 |
| 14 | (Armenia) | DF | Arman Khachatryan | 0 | 0 | 1 | 0 | 1 | 0 |
| 21 | (Russia) | MF | Muslim Bammatgereev | 1 | 0 | 0 | 0 | 1 | 0 |
| 22 | (Ivory Coast) | DF | Michael Gnolou | 0 | 0 | 1 | 0 | 1 | 0 |
| 88 | (Armenia) | MF | Mihran Petrosyan | 1 | 0 | 0 | 0 | 1 | 0 |
| 91 | (Republic of the Congo) | MF | Lie Pato Ngavouka-Tseke | 2 | 0 | 0 | 0 | 2 | 0 |
| | | | TOTALS | 50 | 2 | 8 | 0 | 58 | 2 |
