= 2020–21 Armenian Cup =

Tournament details
- Country: Armenia
- Teams: 14

Final positions
- Champions: Ararat Yerevan
- Runners-up: Alashkert

Tournament statistics
- Matches played: 24
- Goals scored: 63 (2.63 per match)

The 2020–21 Armenian Cup was the 30th edition of the football competition in Armenia. The competition began on 18 September 2020 and ended on 15 May 2021. The winners of the competition earned a place in the first qualifying round of the 2021–22 UEFA Europa Conference League.

Noah were the defending champions of the cup after defeating Ararat-Armenia in the previous season's final on penalties.

Gandzasar Kapan announced that they were withdrawing from the Armenian Cup due to financial difficulties related to the COVID-19 pandemic in Armenia and the 2020 Nagorno-Karabakh conflict.

== Teams ==
Round	Clubs remaining	Clubs involved	Winners from previous round	New entries this round	Leagues entering at this round
First Round	12	12	None	12	4 Armenian First League teams 8 Armenian Premier League teams
Quarterfinals	6	8	6	2	2 Armenian Premier League teams
Semifinals	4	4	4	none	none
Final	2	2	2	none	none

== First round ==
18 September 2020 1st leg	Van	0–0	Noravank	Charentsavan
16:30 (UTC+4)	Arman Khachatryan (yellow card) 67'; Stéphane Adjouman (yellow card) 81'	Report		Stadium: Charentsavan City Stadium; Attendance: 100; Referee: Artak Simonyan

9 November 2020 2nd leg	Noravank	0–2 (0–2 agg.)	Van	Charentsavan
11:30 (UTC+4)	David Quaye (yellow card) 60'	Report	Michael Gnolou (yellow card) 64'; Mihran Manasyan 76'; Yefimov 83'	Stadium: Charentsavan City Stadium; Attendance: 0 Referee: Artak Simonyan

18 September 2020 1st leg	West Armenia	3–2	Gandzasar Kapan	Vagharshapat
16:30 (UTC+4)	Rafael Ghazaryan (yellow card) 30'; Koubi Mondesir (yellow card) 43'; Sargis Baloyan 48'; Evgeniy Kasyanov 53'; Vladimir Kharatyan (yellow card) 80'; Charles Ikechukwu 87'	Report	Davit Minasyan 18', 32' (yellow card) 43'; Adah (yellow card) 61'; Wbeymar (yellow card) 81'	Stadium: Football Academy Stadium; Attendance: 50; Referee: Gevorg Eghoyan

2nd leg	Gandzasar Kapan	w/o	West Armenia	Yerevan
				Stadium: FFA Academy Stadium
Note: Gandzasar Kapan withdrew from the competition on 3 November.

18 September 2020 1st leg	Urartu	2–1	Pyunik	Yerevan
19:30 (UTC+4)	Guz 37'; James (yellow card) 41'; Darbinyan (yellow card) 50'; Radchenko 90+1'	Report	Kobyalko 3'; Alexandre Yeoule (yellow card) 27'; S.Grigoryan (yellow card) 68'; Nirisarike (yellow card) 80'; Levon Vardanyan (yellow card) 82'	Stadium: Urartu Stadium; Attendance: 150; Referee: Artem Gasparyan

25 February 2021 2nd leg	Pyunik	0–0 (1–2 agg.)	Urartu	Yerevan
14:00 (UTC+4)	Higor (yellow card) 55'	Report	Nirisarike (yellow card) 46'; Polyakov (yellow card) 69'; E.Grigoryan (red card) 90'	Stadium: Pyunik Training Centre; Attendance: 0 Referee: Henrik Nalbandyan

19 September 2020 1st leg	Shirak	1–2	Alashkert	Gyumri
16:30 (UTC+4)	Aram Muradyan 4'; Erik Vardanyan (yellow card) 72'; Vardan Arzoyan (yellow card) 72'; Rudik Mkrtchyan (yellow card) 80'	Report	Perdigão (yellow card) 39'; Bryan 41'; Camara 43'; Hovsepyan (yellow card) 59'; Grigoryan (yellow card) 74'; Čančarević (yellow card) 90+1'	Stadium: Gyumri City Stadium; Attendance: 150; Referee: Henrik Nalbandyan

7 November 2020 2nd leg	Alashkert	1–0 (3–1 agg.)	Shirak	Yerevan
12:00 (UTC+4)	Glišić 80'; Thiago Galvão (yellow card) 83'; Dragojević (yellow card) 85'	Report	Erik Vardanyan (yellow card) 22'; Vardan Arzoyan (yellow card) 26'; Petros Afajanyan (yellow card) 44'; Arman Aslanyan (yellow card) 61'; Petros Afajanyan (yellow card) 62'	Stadium: Alashkert Stadium; Attendance: 0 Referee: Vardan Manukyan

19 September 2020 1st leg	BKMA Yerevan	0–0	Lori	Yerevan
16:30 (UTC+4)	Narek Alaverdyan (yellow card) 51'; Stepan Sahradyan (yellow card) 67'	Report		Stadium: FFA Academy Stadium; Attendance: 100; Referee: Artur Safaryan

22 November 2020 2nd leg	Lori	2–2 (2–2 agg.)	BKMA Yerevan	Vanadzor
14:30 (UTC+4)	Osipov 2'; Božović (yellow card) 30'; Claudir 45'	Report	Sergey Mkrtchyan 48'; Hayk Ghevondyan 61'; Arsen Galstyan (yellow card) 89'	Stadium: Vanadzor Football Academy; Attendance: 0 Referee: Artem Gasparyan

19 September 2020 1st leg	Ararat Yerevan	3–0	Sevan	Yerevan
19:30 (UTC+4)	Mory Kone 2', 90+4'; Khurtsidze 28'; Yedigaryan (yellow card) 43'; Mkoyan (yellow card) 77'; Badoyan (yellow card) 85'	Report	Hakob Loretsyan (yellow card) 4'; David Eloev (yellow card) 48'; Aram Loretsyan (yellow card) 84'	Stadium: FFA Academy Stadium; Attendance: 150; Referee: Artush Kerobyan

7 November 2020 2nd leg	Sevan	1–3 (1–6 agg.)	Ararat Yerevan	Yerevan
12:30 (UTC+4)	Areg Azatyan (yellow card) 30'; Mher Sahakyan 83'	Report	Mory Kone 8', 69'; Malakyan 79'	Stadium: RCCSD Stadium; Attendance: 0 Referee: Henrik Nalbandyan

== Quarterfinals ==
11 March 2021 1st leg	West Armenia	2–0	Ararat Yerevan	Vagharshapat
14:00 (UTC+4)	Charles Ikechukwu 22'; Orlov 24'; Hakob Loretsyan (yellow card) 84'	Report		Stadium: Vagharshapat Football Academy; Attendance: 40; Referee: Artur Safaryan

3 April 2021 2nd leg	Ararat Yerevan	5–1 (5–3 agg.)	West Armenia	Yerevan
18:00 (UTC+4)	Khurtsidze 19'; Malakyan 28' (yellow card) 81'; Prljević (yellow card) 57' (goal) 79'; Dimitrije Pobulić 64'; Badoyan (yellow card) 86' (goal) 88'; Zaderaka (yellow card) 89'	Report	Charles Ikechukwu (yellow card) 23'; Vladimir Kharatyan (yellow card) 63'; Dzhigkayev 71'; Karapet Manukyan (yellow card) 72'; Vahe Chopuryan (yellow card) 83'	Stadium: Republican Stadium; Attendance: 250; Referee: Zaven Hovhannisyan

11 March 2021 1st leg	Alashkert	4–0	BKMA Yerevan	Yerevan
16:00 (UTC+4)	Nikita Tankov 23'; Davidyan 34'; Daghbashyan 65'; Gome 84'; Grigoryan (yellow card) 86'	Report	Sergey Mkrtchyan (yellow card) 9'; Stepan Sahradyan (yellow card) 32'	Stadium: Alashkert Stadium; Referee: Ashot Ghaltakchyan

5 April 2021 2nd leg	BKMA Yerevan	1–2 (1–6 agg.)	Alashkert	Yerevan
15:00 (UTC+4)	Shaghoyan 45'	Report	Glišić 24'; Erik Soghomonyan (yellow card) 45'; Ingbede 63'; Voskanyan (yellow card) 90+3'	Stadium: Republican Stadium; Attendance: 80; Referee: Artur Safaryan

12 March 2021 1st leg	Van	0–1	Ararat-Armenia	Charentsavan
14:00 (UTC+4)	Deou Dosa (yellow card) 45'; Aleksey Shishkin (yellow card) 71'; Argishti Petrosyan (yellow card) 90'	Report	Khachumyan (yellow card) 29'; Sanogo 74'	Stadium: Charentsavan City Stadium; Referee: Zaven Hovhannisyan

4 April 2021 2nd leg	Ararat-Armenia	0–1 (a.e.t.) (1–1 agg.) (5 – 4 p)	Van	Yerevan
15:00 (UTC+4)	Vakulenko (yellow card) 70'	Report	Deou Dosa (yellow card) 67'; Edgar Movsesyan 90'; Emmanuel Mireku (yellow card) 116'	Stadium: FFA Academy Stadium; Referee: Ashot Ghaltakchyan
	Penalties
	Alemão (penalty scored); Wbeymar (penalty scored); Ambartsumyan (penalty scored); Vakulenko (penalty scored); Karapetian (penalty scored)		(penalty scored) Voskanyan; (penalty scored) Viulen Ayvazyan; (penalty scored) Tenyayev; (penalty missed) Garegin Kirakosyan

12 March 2021 1st leg	Urartu	0–2	Noah	Yerevan
17:00 (UTC+4)	Tigran Ayunts (yellow card) 23'; Ten (yellow card) 76'	Report	Avetisyan 24' (pen.); Manga 25'; Saná Gomes (yellow card) 36'; Dedechko (yellow card) 65'	Stadium: Urartu Stadium; Attendance: 500; Referee: Artem Gasparyan

3 April 2021 2nd leg	Noah	2–2 (4–2 agg.)	Urartu	Yerevan
15:00 (UTC+4)	Emsis (yellow card) 36'; Dedechko 45' (red card) 60'; Alex Oliveira (yellow card) 50'; Velemir (yellow card) 73'; Azarov 75'; Hovhannisyan (yellow card) 86'	Report	Melkonyan (yellow card) 47'; Paramonov (yellow card) 73'; Annan Mensah (red card) 84'; Désiré 88'; Paderin 90' (pen.); Grigoryan (yellow card) 90+4'	Stadium: FFA Academy Stadium; Attendance: 300; Referee: Henrik Nalbandyan

== Semi–finals ==
20 April 2021 1st leg	Alashkert	1–1	Noah	Yerevan
15:00 (UTC+4)	Kadio (yellow card) 12'; Glišić 31' (pen.); Grigoryan (yellow card) 70'; Gome (yellow card) 90+3'	Report	Saná Gomes (yellow card) 22'; Kovalenko (yellow card) 22'; Paireli (yellow card) 38'; Avetisyan 66' (pen.); Hovhannisyan (yellow card) 81'; Monroy (yellow card) 83'	Stadium: Alashkert Stadium; Attendance: 100; Referee: Zaven Hovhannisyan

30 April 2021 2nd leg	Noah	1–3 (2–4 agg.)	Alashkert	Yerevan
15:00 (UTC+4)	Gyasi 41'; Nikita Dubchak (yellow card) 64'; Emsis (yellow card) 66'; Valerio Vimercati (yellow card) 90+2'; Monroy (yellow card) 90+2'	Report	Hovsepyan 3'; Gome (yellow card) 26'; Glišić 58' (yellow card) 70'; Mihran Manasyan (yellow card) 90+2'; Davidyan 90+5'	Stadium: FFA Academy Stadium; Attendance: 500; Referee: Henrik Nalbandyan

20 April 2021 1st leg	Ararat Yerevan	2–0	Ararat-Armenia	Yerevan
18:30 (UTC+4)	Nenadović 18'; Prljević 48'; Malakyan (yellow card) 55'; Dimitrije Pobulić (yellow card) 89'	Report	Wbeymar (yellow card) 36'; Otubanjo (yellow card) 53'	Stadium: Republican Stadium; Attendance: 400; Referee: Artem Gasparyan

1 May 2021 2nd leg	Ararat-Armenia	2–1 (2–3 agg.)	Ararat Yerevan	Yerevan
15:00 (UTC+4)	Gouffran 23'; Otubanjo (yellow card) 45'; Davit Terteryan 78' (yellow card) 90'	Report	Margaryan (yellow card) 56'; Nenadović 72'; Mkoyan (yellow card) 77'	Stadium: FFA Academy Stadium; Attendance: 400; Referee: Zaven Hovhannisyan

== Final ==
15 May 2021
19:00 (UTC+4)

Alashkert	1–3	Ararat Yerevan
Kadio (yellow card) 47'; Aghekyan (yellow card) 65'; Mihran Manasyan 85' (yellow card) 90+2'; Hovsepyan (red card) 90'	Report	Papikyan 12'; Mory Kone 19', 55'; Prljević (yellow card) 49'

Republican Stadium, Yerevan
Attendance: 4,000
Referee: Benoit Millot (France)

== Scorers ==
As of match played 15 May 2021

6 goals:

- (Ivory Coast) Mory Kone - Ararat Yerevan

4 goals:

- (Bosnia and Herzegovina) Aleksandar Glišić - Alashkert

2 goals:

- (Russia) David Davidyan - Alashkert
- (Armenia) Edgar Malakyan - Ararat Yerevan
- (Russia) David Khurtsidze - Ararat Yerevan
- (Serbia) Uroš Nenadović - Ararat Yerevan
- (Serbia) Marko Prljević - Ararat Yerevan
- (Armenia) Davit Minasyan - Gandzasar Kapan
- (Armenia) Petros Avetisyan - Noah
- (Nigeria) Charles Ikechukwu - West Armenia
- (Armenia) Mihran Manasyan - Van/Alashkert

1 goals:

- (Armenia) Gagik Daghbashyan - Alashkert
- (Armenia) Rumyan Hovsepyan - Alashkert
- (Brazil) Bryan - Alashkert
- (Namibia) Wangu Gome - Alashkert
- (Nigeria) Sunday Ingbede - Alashkert
- (Russia) Nikita Tankov - Alashkert
- (Senegal) Pape Camara - Alashkert
- Davit Terteryan - Ararat-Armenia
- (Burkina Faso) Zakaria Sanogo - Ararat-Armenia
- (France) Yoan Gouffran - Ararat-Armenia
- (Armenia) Zaven Badoyan - Ararat Yerevan
- (Armenia) Aghvan Papikyan - Ararat Yerevan
- (Serbia) Dimitrije Pobulić - Ararat Yerevan
- (Armenia) Sergey Mkrtchyan - BKMA Yerevan
- (Armenia) Hayk Ghevondyan - BKMA Yerevan
- (Armenia) Zhirayr Shaghoyan - BKMA Yerevan
- (Brazil) Claudir - Lori
- (Russia) Pavel Osipov - Lori
- (Ghana) Raymond Gyasi - Noah
- (Guinea-Bissau) Helistano Manga - Noah
- (Russia) Vladimir Azarov - Noah
- (Ukraine) Denys Dedechko - Noah
- (Russia) Anton Kobyalko - Pyunik
- (Armenia) Mher Sahakyan - Sevan
- (Armenia) Aram Muradyan - Shirak
- (Haiti) Jonel Désiré - Urartu
- (Russia) Dmitry Guz - Urartu
- (Russia) Igor Paderin - Urartu
- (Russia) Aleksandr Radchenko - Urartu
- Sargis Baloyan - West Armenia
- (Russia) Roman Dzhigkayev - West Armenia
- (Russia) Evgeniy Kasyanov - West Armenia
- (Russia) Sergei Orlov - West Armenia
- (Armenia) Edgar Movsesyan - Van
- (Russia) Stanislav Yefimov - Van

== See also ==
- 2020–21 Armenian Premier League
