= Radchenko =

Radchenko (Ukrainian; Ра́дченко) is a Ukrainian surname. Notable people with the surname include.

- Aleksandr Nikolayevich Radchenko (b. 1993), Russian association football player
- Alexander Radchenko, Transnistrian activist and politician
- Andrew Radchenko (b. 1955), Australian rules footballer
- Andriy Radchenko (b. 1972), Ukrainian banker, manager of agrarian sector
- Artem Radchenko (b. 1995), Ukrainian association football player
- Dmitri Radchenko (b. 1970), Russian association football player
- Ludmilla Radchenko (b. 1978), Russian female model
- Lyubov Radchenko (1871–1962), Belarusian revolutionary
- Nikolai Radchenko (b. 1995), Russian football player
- Oleksandr Radchenko (1976–2023), Ukrainian association football player
- Olena Radchenko (b. 1973), Ukrainian female handball player
- Sergey Radchenko, British historian
- Viktor Radchenko (b. 1968), Ukrainian decathlete
- Volodymyr Radchenko (1948–2023), Ukrainian politician and General of Army of Ukraine

== See also ==
- Radchenko (urban-type settlement), an urban-type settlement in Tver Oblast, Russia
