= Olena Radchenko =

Ukrainian handball player

Personal information
- Full name: Olena Viktorivna Radchenko
- Nationality: Ukrainian
- Born: May 21, 1973 (age 53) Brovary, Ukrainian SSR, Soviet Union
- Height: 1.75 m (5 ft 9 in)
- Weight: 67 kg (148 lb)

Sport
- Sport: Handball
- Position: Left wing
- Current club: Retired

Senior clubs
- Years: Team
- –1999: Avtomobilist / Halytchanka Lviv
- 1999–2000: HC Spartak Kyiv
- 2000–2002: Oltchim Râmnicu Vâlcea
- 2002–2005: Kometal Gjorče Petrov Skopje
- 2005–2007: HC Spartak Kyiv
- 2007–2008: A.C. Elpides Drama
- 2008–2009: AC Ormi-Loux Patras
National team
Years	Team	Apps	(Gls)
1994–2007	Ukraine	124+'	(302+)
Medal record
Representing Ukraine
Women's handball
Olympic Games
Bronze medal – third place	2004 Athens	Team
European Championship
Silver medal – second place	2000 Romania	Team

For other people named Radchenko, see Radchenko.

Olena Radchenko, Ukr. Олена Радченко (born 21 May 1973) is a Ukrainian team handball player. She received a bronze medal with the Ukrainian national team at the 2004 Summer Olympics in Athens. She also won a silver medal at the 2000 European Women's Handball Championship, losing to Hungary in the final.
