= Vladislav Vasilyev (footballer, born 1999) =

Russian footballer

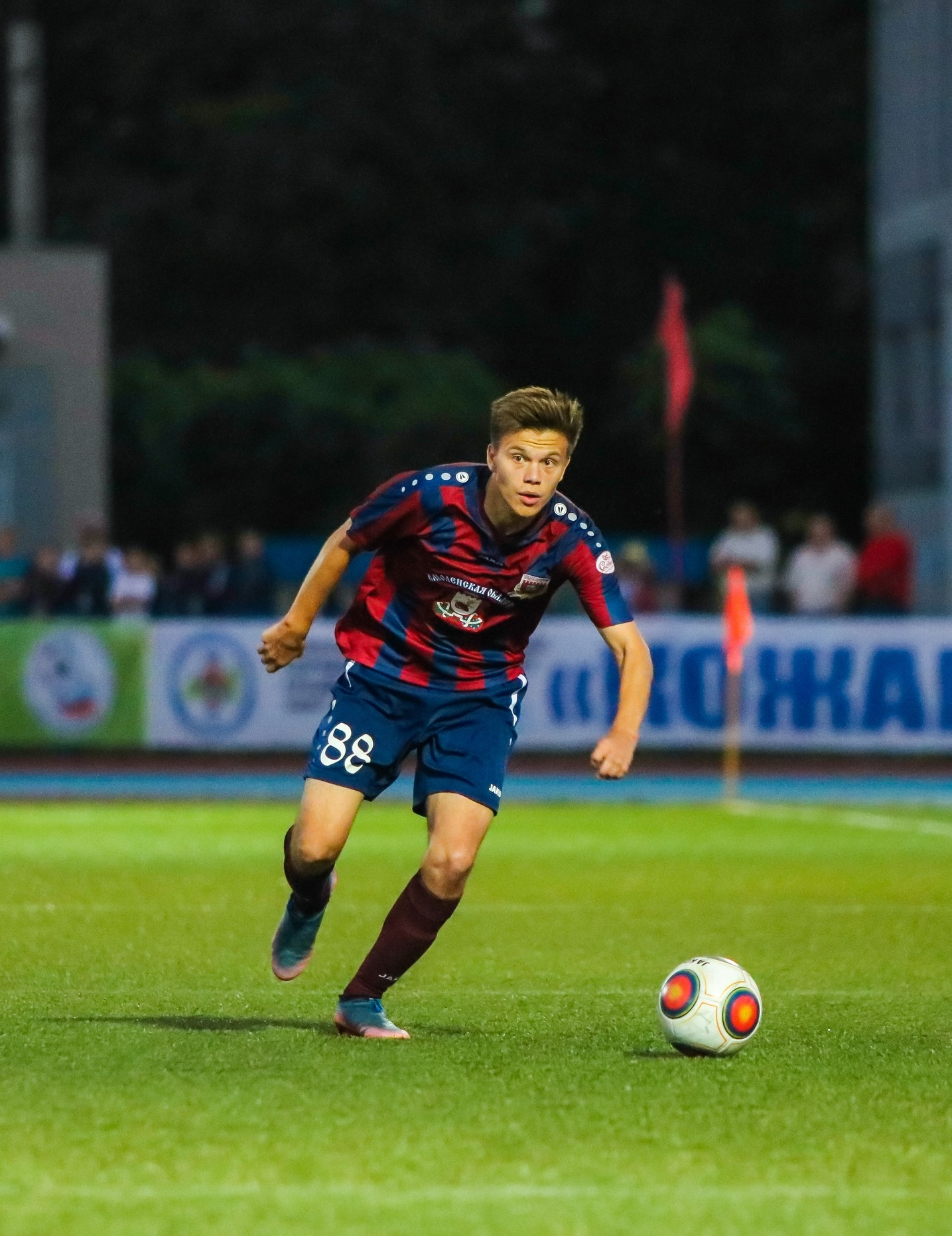

Personal information
- Full name: Vladislav Olegovich Vasilyev
- Date of birth: 27 July 1999 (age 27)
- Place of birth: Krasnodar, Russia
- Height: 1.84 m (6 ft 0 in)
- Position: Midfielder

Youth career
- 2006–2014: Academy of Football (Krasnodar)
- 2014–2017: Kuban Krasnodar
- 2017–2018: Bežanija

Senior career*
Years	Team	Apps	(Gls)
2018	Dnepr Smolensk	24	(3)
2019–2020	Spartak-2 Moscow	28	(0)
2021	Van	4	(0)
2022–2023	Druzhba Maykop	22	(4)
- * Club domestic league appearances and goals

Vladislav Olegovich Vasilyev (Russian: Владислав Олегович Васильев; born 27 July 1999) is a Russian former football player.

== Club career ==
He made his debut in the Russian Professional Football League for SFC CRFSO Smolensk on 2 April 2018 in a game against FC Tekstilshchik Ivanovo.

He made his Russian Football National League debut for FC Spartak-2 Moscow on 3 March 2019 in a game against FC Rotor Volgograd.
