= Andrew Radchenko =

Australian rules footballer

Personal information
- Full name: Andrew Radchenko
- Born: 3 May 1955 (age 71)
- Original team: Essendon High School
- Height: 180 cm (5 ft 11 in)
- Weight: 73 kg (161 lb)
- Position: Half-back flank

Playing career^{1}
| Years | Club | Games (Goals) |
| 1975 | Essendon | 1 (0) |
- ^{1} Playing statistics correct to the end of 1975.

Andrew Radchenko (born 3 May 1955) is a former Australian rules footballer who played for the Essendon Football Club in the Victorian Football League (VFL). He later played for Avondale Heights, Ascot Vale and Brunswick.

== Football career ==
In 1976/77 he played for Avondale Heights. From 1978 to 1980 — for Ascot Vale. In 1981/1982 Andrew joined Brunswick.
