= Andriy Radchenko =

Ukrainian businessman and banker

Andriy Radchenko (Андрій Анатолійович Радченко)
- Born: November 12, 1972 (age 53); Kharkiv
- Occupations: Manager, Economist
- Organization: PJSC 'Agrarian fund' (Chairman of Board)

Andriy Radchenko (Ukrainian: Андрій Анатолійович Радченко; born 12 November 1972, Kharkiv) is a Ukrainian businessman, banker, manager of agrarian sector. He is the head of state-owned company PJSC "Agrarian fund", which is one of the leading operators of the agrarian market of Ukraine.

== Biography ==
Andriy Radchenko received his higher education at the universities of Kharkiv.

In 1994 he graduated from the H.S. Skovoroda Kharkiv National Pedagogical University (mathematics).

In 1997 he graduated from the Karazin University (economics).

Married. Has a son.

== Professional career ==
Andriy Radchenko started his professional activity in 1994 at JSCIB "UkrSibbank". He worked there until 2003 and rose from a specialist to the head of a retail business.

Since 2003 Andriy Radchenko has held positions in various financial institutions: "Finance and Credit", "Index Bank", Credit Agricole SA, "Global Ukraine", "Phoenix-Capital".

In 2011, Radchenko became Managing Director of "Agro Solutions Group".

On 25 February 2015, Andriy Radchenko was appointed Chairman of the Board of PJSC "Agrarian fund".

He and his team took the company to the 8th position of the largest taxpayers of Ukraine in the wholesale of grain, unprocessed tobacco, seeds and animal feed (2017), and to 144th position of the largest Ukrainian companies (2018).

In August 2019 in Washington Andriy Radchenko held talks with lobbyists to create a land market in Ukraine.
