= Pyotr Ten =

Russian footballer (born 1992)

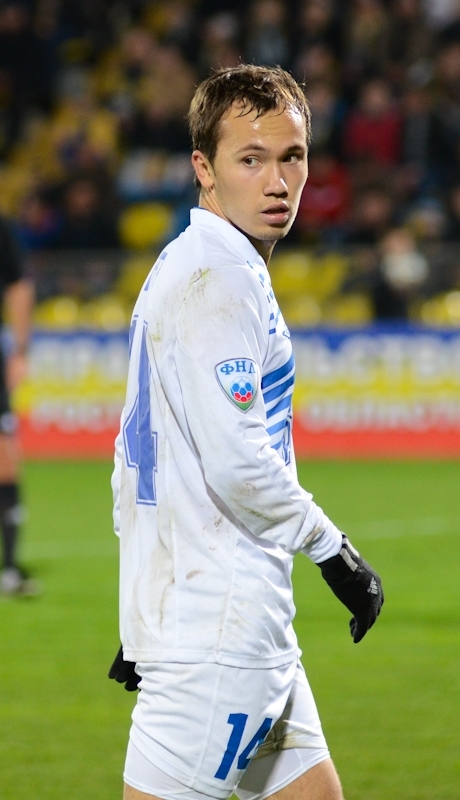

Personal information
- Full name: Pyotr Alekseyevich Ten
- Date of birth: 12 July 1992 (age 34)
- Place of birth: Moscow, Russia
- Height: 1.75 m (5 ft 9 in)
- Position: Defender

Youth career
- CSKA Moscow

Senior career*
Years	Team	Apps	(Gls)
2010–2016	CSKA Moscow	1	(0)
2013–2014	→ Rotor Volgograd (loan)	28	(1)
2014–2015	→ Anzhi Makhachkala (loan)	3	(0)
2015–2016	→ Tom Tomsk (loan)	28	(0)
2016	Tom Tomsk	4	(0)
2017–2018	Yenisey Krasnoyarsk	12	(0)
2018	Tom Tomsk	8	(0)
2019–2020	Armavir	37	(1)
2020	Minsk	8	(0)
2021–2022	Urartu	33	(0)

International career
2009	Russia U17	7	(2)
2010	Russia U18	8	(1)
2011	Russia U19	2	(0)
2013–2014	Russia U21	12	(0)
- * Club domestic league appearances and goals

Pyotr Alekseyevich Ten (Russian: Пётр Алексеевич Тен; born 12 July 1992) is a Russian former professional football player who played as a right back or left back.

== Career ==
He made his debut in the Russian Premier League on 26 May 2013 for PFC CSKA Moscow in a game against FC Rostov.

In June 2014, Ten joined Anzhi Makhachkala on a season-long loan.

On 16 January 2017, he joined FC Yenisey Krasnoyarsk.

On 17 February 2021, Ten signed for FC Urartu.

== Career statistics ==
=== Club ===
As of match played 1 August 2021

Appearances and goals by club, season and competition
Club	Season	League			National Cup		Continental		Other		Total	
Club	Season	Division	Apps	Goals	Apps	Goals	Apps	Goals	Apps	Goals	Apps	Goals
CSKA Moscow	2010	Russian Premier League	0	0	0	0	0 (Note: Appearances in the UEFA Champions League and UEFA Europa League)	0	0 (Note: Appearances in the Russian Super Cup)	0	0	0
CSKA Moscow	2011–12	Russian Premier League	0	0	0	0	0	0	0	0	0	0
CSKA Moscow	2012–13	Russian Premier League	1	0	0	0	0 (Note: Appearances in the UEFA Europa League)	0	-		1	0
CSKA Moscow	2013–14	Russian Premier League	0	0	0	0	0 (Note: Appearances in the UEFA Europa League)	0	0	0	0	0
CSKA Moscow	2014–15	Russian Premier League	0	0	0	0	0	0	0	0	0	0
CSKA Moscow	Total		1	0	0	0	0	0	0	0	1	0
Rotor Volgograd (loan)	2013–14	Russian FNL	28	1	2	0	—		—		0	0
Anzhi Makhachkala (loan)	2014–15	Russian FNL	3	0	1	0	—		—		3	0
Tom Tomsk (loan)	2015–16	Russian FNL	28	0	1	0	—		—		28	0
Tom Tomsk	2016–17	Russian Premier League	4	0	1	0	—		—		4	0
Yenisey Krasnoyarsk	2016–17	Russian FNL	9	0	0	0	—		0 (Note: Appearances in the Russian Premier League Relegation play-offs)	0	9	0
Yenisey Krasnoyarsk	2017–18	Russian FNL	3	0	1	0	—		—		4	0
Yenisey Krasnoyarsk	Total		12	0	1	0	-	-	-	-	13	0
Tom Tomsk	2018–19	Russian FNL	8	0	1	0	—		—		9	0
Armavir	2018–19	Russian FNL	14	1	0	0	—		—		4	0
Armavir	2019–20	Russian FNL	23	0	1	0	—		—		4	0
Armavir	Total		37	1	1	0	-	-	-	-	38	1
Minsk	2020	Belarusian Premier League	8	0	1	0	—		—		9	0
Urartu	2020–21	Armenian Premier League	13	0	3	0	—		—		16	0
Urartu	2021–22	Armenian Premier League	1	0	0	0	2 (Note: Appearances in the UEFA Europa Conference League)	0	-		3	0
Urartu	Total		14	0	3	0	2	0	-	-	19	0
Career total			133	2	12	0	2	0	0	0	157	2

== Honours ==
CSKA Moscow

- Russian Premier League (1): 2012–13
- Russian Cup (1): 2012–13
