= Maksim Mashnyov =

Russian footballer

Personal information
- Full name: Maksim Vitalyevich Mashnyov
- Date of birth: 12 January 1993 (age 33)
- Place of birth: Irkutsk, Russia
- Height: 1.69 m (5 ft 7 in)
- Position: Midfielder

Team information
- Current team: Dynamo Vladivostok
- Number: 19

Senior career*
Years	Team	Apps	(Gls)
2012–2015	Baikal Irkutsk	81	(4)
2016–2018	Arsenal Tula	1	(0)
2016–2018	→ Luch-Energiya Vladivostok (loan)	54	(0)
2018–2019	Luch Vladivostok	27	(2)
2019–2020	Chayka Peschanokopskoye	23	(2)
2020	Urartu	6	(0)
2021–2022	Tyumen	33	(2)
2022–2023	Dynamo Vladivostok	48	(4)
2024–2026	Irkutsk	57	(7)
2026–	Dynamo Vladivostok	32	(3)
- * Club domestic league appearances and goals as of 15 November 2026

Maksim Vitalyevich Mashnyov (Russian: Максим Витальевич Машнёв; born 12 January 1993) is a Russian football midfielder who plays for Dynamo Vladivostok.

== Club career ==
Mashnyov made his debut in the Russian Second Division for FC Baikal Irkutsk on 15 July 2012 in a game against FC Sakhalin Yuzhno-Sakhalinsk. He made his Russian Football National League debut for Baikal on 11 July 2015 in a game against FC Arsenal Tula.

On 15 July 2020, Mashnyov signed for FC Urartu.
