= Roman Dzhigkayev =

Russian football player

Personal information
- Full name: Roman Taymurazovich Dzhigkayev
- Date of birth: 29 November 1993 (age 32)
- Place of birth: Vladikavkaz, Russia
- Height: 1.82 m (6 ft 0 in)
- Position: Midfielder

Team information
- Current team: FC West Armenia
- Number: 15

Youth career
- FC Volgograd-VUOR Volgograd

Senior career*
Years	Team	Apps	(Gls)
2011–2012	FC Volga Nizhny Novgorod	0	(0)
2012	FC Baník Ostrava	0	(0)
2013	FC Shakhtyor Peshelan		
2013	FC Zimbru Chișinău	10	(0)
2014	FC Trud Tikhoretsk		
2015	FC Torpedo Armavir	8	(0)
2015–2016	FC Kolomna	25	(4)
2016–2017	FC Luch-Energiya Vladivostok	6	(0)
2017	FC Zenit-Izhevsk	7	(0)
2018	FC Kolomna	9	(2)
2018	FC Spartak Vladikavkaz	1	(0)
2019	FC Kolomna	8	(0)
2019–2020	FC West Armenia	22	(7)
2020–2021	FC Chikhura Sachkhere	4	(0)
2021–	FC West Armenia	2	(1)
- * Club domestic league appearances and goals as of 7 March 2021

Roman Taymurazovich Dzhigkayev (Russian: Роман Таймуразович Джигкаев; born 29 November 1993) is a Russian football player. He plays for FC West Armenia.

== Club career ==
He made his debut in the Russian Professional Football League for FC Torpedo Armavir on 28 March 2015 in a game against FC Krasnodar-2.

He made his Russian Football National League debut for FC Luch-Energiya Vladivostok on 11 July 2016 in a game against FC Mordovia Saransk.

== Personal life ==
He is the younger brother of footballer Georgi Dzhigkayev.
