= Nikolai Radchenko =

Russian footballer (born 1995)

Personal information
- Full name: Nikolai Nikolayevich Radchenko
- Date of birth: 15 November 1995 (age 30)
- Place of birth: Khabarovsk, Russia
- Height: 1.88 m (6 ft 2 in)
- Position: Centre back

Youth career
- FC SKA-Energiya Khabarovsk

Senior career*
Years	Team	Apps	(Gls)
2014–2017	FC SKA-Khabarovsk	4	(0)
2016	→ FC Nosta Novotroitsk (loan)	14	(2)
2017	→ FC Tyumen (loan)	0	(0)
2017	FC Nosta Novotroitsk	2	(0)
2018–2019	FC Nosta Novotroitsk	19	(2)
2019–2020	FC Tekstilshchik Ivanovo	17	(0)
2020	FC Murom	15	(1)
- * Club domestic league appearances and goals

Nikolai Nikolayevich Radchenko (Russian: Николай Николаевич Радченко; born 15 November 1995) is a Russian former football player.

== Club career ==
He made his professional debut in the Russian Football National League for FC SKA-Energiya Khabarovsk on 10 August 2014 in a game against FC Tosno.

== Personal ==
He is the younger brother of Aleksandr Radchenko.
