= Igor Paderin =

Russian footballer

Personal information
- Full name: Igor Sergeyevich Paderin
- Date of birth: 24 November 1989 (age 36)
- Place of birth: Omsk, Russian SFSR
- Height: 1.76 m (5 ft 9 1/2 in)
- Positions: Forward; winger

Youth career
- 2003–2008: Amkar Perm

Senior career*
Years	Team	Apps	(Gls)
2008–2009	KUZBASS Kemerovo	31	(10)
2010	Torpedo Vladimir	18	(5)
2011–2013	Kuban Krasnodar	3	(0)
2011–2012	→ Amkar Perm (loan)	0	(0)
2012–2013	→ Tyumen (loan)	10	(1)
2014	FC Sochi	10	(6)
2015	Oryol	0	(0)
2015	Ulisses	0	(0)
2015	Torpedo Armavir	15	(1)
2016	Guria Lanchkhuti		
2017–2019	Armavir	73	(12)
2020	Urartu	1	(1)
2021	Urartu	8	(1)
2024	Dynamo Barnaul	10	(1)

Managerial career
- 2022–2024: Urartu II
- * Club domestic league appearances and goals

Igor Sergeyevich Paderin (Russian: Игорь Серге́евич Падерин; born 24 November 1989) is a Russian professional football coach and a former player.

== Club career ==
Paderin made his Russian Premier League debut for Kuban Krasnodar on 10 June 2011 in a game against Amkar Perm.

On 14 February 2020, Urartu announced the signing of Paderin. On 9 July 2020, Paderin announced his retirement from football, taking up a position with Urartu's academy. On 18 February 2021 it was confirmed, that Paderin had come out of retirement and again would play for Urartu for the 2021 season.
