= Urartu Training Centre =

Football training ground in Yerevan, Armenia

Urartu FC Training Centre
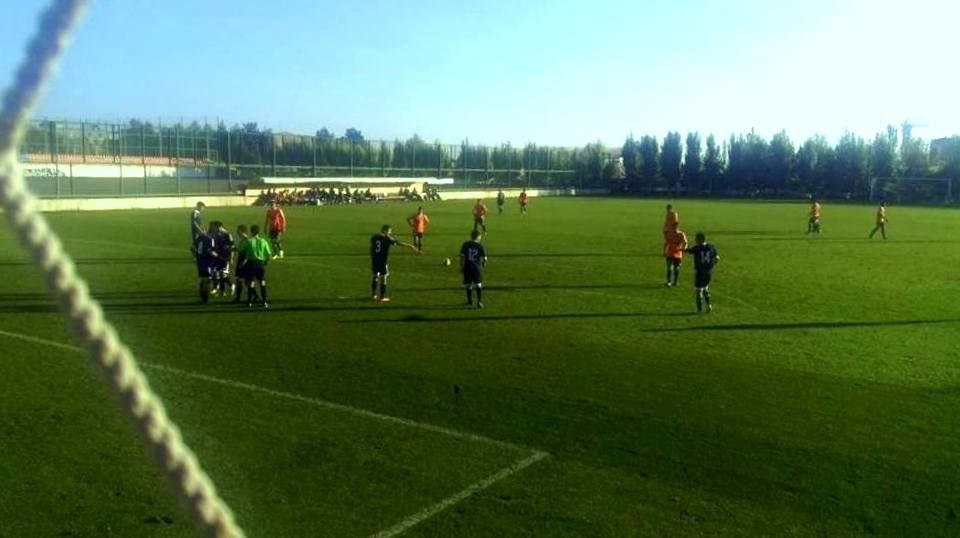
- Interactive map of Urartu FC Training Centre
- Former names: Malatia Football School; Banants Training Centre
- Location: Yerevan; Armenia
- Coordinates: 40°10′20″N 44°27′02″E
- Owner: Urartu
- Type: Football training facility

Construction
- Opened: 23 May 2003

Tenants
- FC Banants (training); Banants-2 (official matches)

Website
- Official website

Urartu Training Centre, is the training ground and academy base of the Armenian football club Urartu. It houses the club's main stadium, 3 additional full-size training pitches, mini football pitches as well as an indoor facility. The current technical director of the academy is the former Armenian footballer Rafael Nazaryan.

== History ==
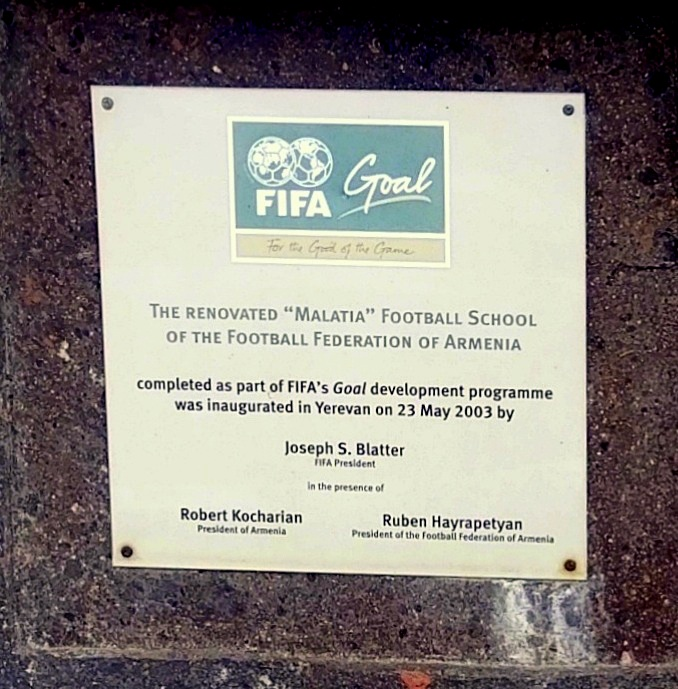
The inauguration details of the centre

Urartu Training Centre was officially opened on 23 May 2003 on the grounds of the former Malatia Football School named after Eduard Grigoryan, located in the Malatia-Sebastia District of the capital Yerevan. The opening ceremony was attended by then-presidents of FIFA Sepp Blatter, then-president of Armenia Robert Kocharyan, and then-president of the Football Federation of Armenia Ruben Hayrapetyan. The centre was renovated and completed as part of FIFA's Goal development programme. Occupying an area of 65,000 m^{2}, the centre is used for youth and senior teams training.

On 16 October 2007, Sepp Blatter along with then-presidents of the UEFA Michel Platini, visited the centre during their 2-day official visit to Armenia.

On 7 October 2015, Fabio Capello visited the training centre. Admired by the club facilities, Capello told the journalists that "Banants has a great base for training and work".

In November 2016, the centre hosted the training sessions of the Swiss and the Italian under-19 teams, participating in the 2017 UEFA European Under-19 Championship qualification, group 7. Impressed by the centre, the Swiss team manager Gérard Castella told the journalists that the "conditions here are simply fantastic".

On 15 December 2017, a new artificial pitch was installed in the centre with the financial assistance of the Football Federation of Armenia.

As of April 2017, the academy runs 6 youth teams with ages ranging between 13 and 17. The directing coach of the academy is Artashes Adamyan.

The centre frequently hosts local and foreign football clubs for periodic training camps and friendly matches.

== Facilities ==
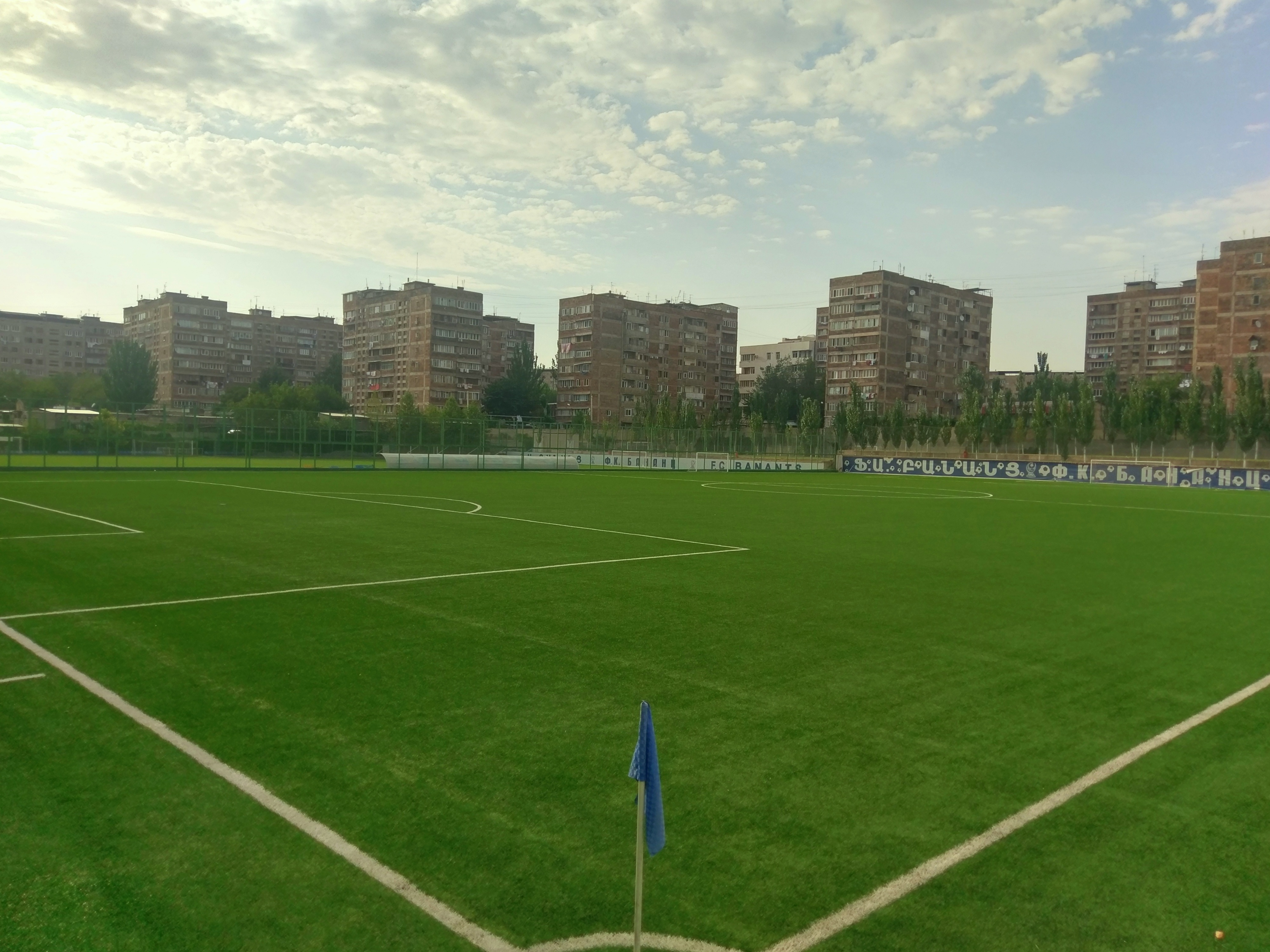
Artificial-turf training pitch (pitch no.2)

With a total area of 65,000 m^{2}, Banants Training Centre is the largest football academy in Armenia owned by a club and the 2nd largest football training base in Yerevan following the Yerevan Football Academy. It is home to a large number of training facilities including:

- Urartu Stadium with a capacity of 4,860 seats, is the home stadium of Urartu.
- 2 full-size artificial pitches, with the first pitch having a seating capacity of 600 seats, used by Banants-2; the reserve team of the club. The first artificial turf was installed in 2007 with the assistance of the Football Federation of Armenia and the FIFA Goal Programme.
- 1 full-size natural grass pitch.
- 2 natural grass and 1 artificial turf seven-a-side training pitches.
- 1 artificial turf five-a-side training pitch.
- 1 indoor mini football training hall.
- Service centre with swimming pool and gymnasium. The club headquarters are located at the 2nd floor of the building.
