= Salomon Nirisarike =

Rwandan footballer

Personal information
- Date of birth: 23 March 1993 (age 33)
- Place of birth: Gisenyi, Rwanda
- Height: 1.85 m (6 ft 1 in)
- Position: Defender

Senior career*
Years	Team	Apps	(Gls)
2011–2012	Isonga		
2012–2014	Royal Antwerp	44	(3)
2014–2016	Sint-Truidense	16	(0)
2016–2019	Tubize	86	(4)
2019–2021	Pyunik	19	(1)
2021–2022	Urartu	25	(0)

International career^{‡}
2012–	Rwanda	27	(0)
- * Club domestic league appearances and goals as of 07:23, 8 June 2022 (UTC) ‡ National team caps and goals as of 06:17, 8 August 2021 (UTC)

Salomon Nirisarike (born 23 March 1993) is a Rwandan international footballer who plays as a defender.

== Club career ==
Born in Gisenyi, Nirisarike spent his early career with for Isonga, Royal Antwerp, Sint-Truidense and Tubize. On 1 September 2019, Nirisarike signed for FC Pyunik, extending his contract with Pyunik on 2 December 2019.

On 19 February 2021, Nirisarike joined FC Urartu. On 2 June 2022 Nirisarike left Urartu after his contract expired.

== International career ==
Nirisarike made his international debut for Rwanda in 2012, and he has appeared in FIFA World Cup qualifying matches.
