= Aleksandr Tenyayev =

Russian footballer

Personal information
- Full name: Aleksandr Dmitriyevich Tenyayev
- Date of birth: 11 March 1996 (age 30)
- Height: 1.85 m (6 ft 1 in)
- Position: Defender

Senior career*
| Years | Team | Apps | (Gls) |
| 2014–2016 | Mordovia Saransk | 0 | (0) |
| 2016–2017 | KAMAZ | 19 | (0) |
| 2017–2018 | Zenit-Izhevsk | 22 | (0) |
| 2018–2019 | Volga Ulyanovsk | 22 | (1) |
| 2019–2020 | Mordovia Saransk | 12 | (1) |
| 2020–2021 | Van | 17 | (1) |
| 2021–2022 | Saransk | 28 | (3) |
| 2022–2023 | Tekstilshchik Ivanovo | 22 | (0) |
| 2023–2025 | Ufa | 65 | (5) |
- * Club domestic league appearances and goals as of 29 November 2025

Aleksandr Dmitriyevich Tenyayev (Russian: Александр Дмитриевич Теняев; born 11 March 1996) is a Russian football player.

== Club career ==
Tenyayev made his debut in the Russian Professional Football League for KAMAZ Naberezhnye Chelny on 28 July 2016 in a game against Volga Ulyanovsk.

Tenyayev made his Russian Football National League debut for Mordovia Saransk on 13 July 2019 in a game against Shinnik Yaroslavl.

On 9 August 2020, Tenyayev signed for Armenian Premier League club Van.
