= Aleksandr Radchenko (footballer) =

Russian footballer

Personal information
- Full name: Aleksandr Nikolayevich Radchenko
- Date of birth: 14 September 1993 (age 33)
- Place of birth: Druzhba, Russia
- Height: 1.90 m (6 ft 3 in)
- Position: Forward

Senior career*
| Years | Team | Apps | (Gls) |
| 2011–2013 | FC SKA-Energiya Khabarovsk | 48 | (5) |
| 2014–2015 | FC Tosno | 38 | (5) |
| 2015 | FC Sokol Saratov | 24 | (4) |
| 2016–2017 | FC Yenisey Krasnoyarsk | 10 | (0) |
| 2016–2017 | → FC Volgar Astrakhan (loan) | 22 | (2) |
| 2017–2018 | FC Khimki | 24 | (3) |
| 2018–2019 | FC SKA-Khabarovsk | 21 | (1) |
| 2019–2020 | FC Tekstilshchik Ivanovo | 24 | (5) |
| 2020–2021 | FC Urartu | 6 | (1) |
| 2021 | FC Dynamo Bryansk | 15 | (0) |
| 2021–2022 | FC Novosibirsk | 13 | (1) |

International career
| 2010 | Russia U-17 | 3 | (1) |
| 2013 | Russia U-20 | 2 | (1) |
- * Club domestic league appearances and goals

Aleksandr Nikolayevich Radchenko (Russian: Александр Николаевич Радченко; born 14 September 1993) is a Russian former professional football player.

== Club career ==
He made his Russian Football National League debut for FC SKA-Energiya Khabarovsk on 25 September 2011 in a game against FC Sibir Novosibirsk.

== Personal life ==
He is the older brother of Nikolai Radchenko.
