= 2019–20 Armenian Cup =

Tournament details
- Country: Armenia
- Teams: 20

Final positions
- Champions: Noah
- Runners-up: Ararat-Armenia

Tournament statistics
- Matches played: 19
- Goals scored: 69 (3.63 per match)

The 2019–20 Armenian Cup was the 29th edition of the football competition between clubs in Armenia. FC Noah won the Cup for the first time. The tournament began on 6 September 2019 and ended on 10 July 2020.

Alashkert were the defending cup champions after defeating Lori the previous season by a score of 1–0.

== First round ==
Three first round matches were played on 6 September 2019.

5 September 2019	Dilijan (2)	w/o	Makaravank (2)	Dilijan
(UTC+4)		Report		Stadium: UWC Dilijan Ground

6 September 2019	Torpedo Yerevan (2)	3–0	Masis(2)	Abovyan
17:00 (UTC+4)	Karen Avoyan 42'; Osman Suleymanov (yellow card) 57'; Roman Muradyan 87' (o.g.); Sulaiman Animassaun (yellow card) 90+1'; Deda 90+4' (pen.)	Report	Helder Oliveira (yellow card) 5'; Mikhail Popov (yellow card) 85'; Avanesyan (yellow card) 90+5'	Stadium: Abovyan City Stadium; Attendance: 100; Referee: Ashot Ghaltakchyan

6 September 2019	West Armenia (2)	7–1	Ani Yerevan (2)	Dzoraghbyur
17:00 (UTC+4)	Mher Harutyunyan 18'; Stepan Harutyunyan 23' (pen.), 33', 54'; Zorin (yellow card) 49' (goal) 90'; Kharatyan (yellow card) 61'; Zhabkin 64'; Kupchin 77'	Report	Karen Khachatryan (yellow card) 21'; Anton Demenschin 24'	Stadium: Dzoraghbyur Sports Centre; Attendance: 30; Referee: Edgar Sahakyan

6 September 2019	Aragats (2)	0–6	Van (2)	Charentsavan
17:00 (UTC+4)	Oleksandr Morev (yellow card) 30'; Murad Asatryan (yellow card) 38'; Yevhenii Konyashin (yellow card) 83' (yellow-red card) 85'	Report	Andreyev 15' (pen.), 48' (pen.); Muslim Bammatgereev 31'; Eza 37'; Khastsayev 82' (pen.), 89'	Stadium: Charentsavan City Stadium; Attendance: 1,050; Referee: Gevorg Bdoyan

== Second round ==
Eight second round matches were played between 1 November and 3 November 2019.

1 November 2019	Dilijan (2)	w/o	Lori (1)	Dilijan
14:00 (UTC+4)		Report		Stadium: UWC Dilijan Ground

1 November 2019	Gandzasar Kapan (1)	2–1	Shirak (1)	Yerevan
15:00 (UTC+4)	Annan Mensah 23'; Gevorg Ohanyan (yellow card) 35'; G.Harutyunyan 40'; Davit Minasyan (yellow card) 81'; Emil Yeghiazaryan (yellow card) 87'	Report	Solomon Udo 10'; Miličić (yellow card) 56'; Aram Muradyan (yellow card) 85'	Stadium: Yerevan Football Academy Stadium; Attendance: 120; Referee: Henrik Nalbandyan

2 November 2019	Sevan (2)	2–0	Yerevan (1)	Dzoraghbyur
14:30 (UTC+4)	Andrey Gladysh (yellow card) 45'; Areg Azatyan 50' (yellow card) 84'; Riabets 90'	Report		Stadium: Dzoraghbyur Training Centre; Attendance: 30; Referee: Artem Gasparyan

2 November 2019	Lokomotiv Yerevan (2)	0–1	Van (2)	Yerevan
14:30 (UTC+4)	Aram Shakhnazaryan (yellow card) 65'; Lutsenko (yellow card) 74'	Report	Batraz Tedeyev (yellow card) 4'; Muslim Bammatgereev 9'; Aleksandr Ladik (yellow card) 33'; Vardan Safaryan (yellow card) 42'; Semur Agamagomedov (yellow card) 59'	Stadium: RCCSD Stadium; Attendance: 500; Referee: Gevorg Eghoyan

2 November 2019	Pyunik (1)	0–0 (a.e.t.) (3–5 p)	Urartu (1)	Yerevan
16:00 (UTC+4)	Stankov (yellow card) 80'; Robert Hakobyan (yellow card) 90'	Report		Stadium: Vazgen Sargsyan Republican Stadium; Attendance: 350; Referee: Zaven Hovhannisyan

3 November 2019	West Armenia (2)	0–5	Ararat-Armenia (1)	Dzoraghbyur
14:30 (UTC+4)	G.Dzhigkayev (yellow card) 30'; Kharatyan (yellow card) 56'	Report	Louis 9'; Avanesyan 38', 89'; Harutyunyan 74'; Volkov 84' (o.g.)	Stadium: Dzoraghbyur Training Centre; Attendance: 60; Referee: Edgar Sahakyan

3 November 2019	Torpedo Yerevan (2)	1–3	Alashkert (1)	Abovyan
15:00 (UTC+4)	Sukhodub (yellow card) 37'; Myroslav Deda 49'; Khoren Veranyan (yellow card) 62'	Report	David Ghandilyan 22'; Avahimyan 66'; Sargis Shahinyan (yellow card) 67'; Thiago Galvão 75'; Tankov (yellow card) 85'; Kirill Aloyan (yellow card) 90+4'	Stadium: Abovyan City Stadium; Attendance: 150; Referee: Artush Kerobyan

3 November 2019	Noah (1)	1–0	Ararat Yerevan (1)	Yerevan
16:00 (UTC+4)	Mayrovich 33'; Azarov (yellow card) 63'; Zaprudskikh (yellow card) 70'	Report	Balyaikin (yellow card) 74'	Stadium: Alashkert Stadium; Attendance: 400; Referee: Shahen Aghayan

== Quarter–finals ==
The quarter–final matches were played on 27 November 2019.

27 November 2019	Sevan	2–11	Ararat-Armenia	Dzoraghbyur
14:00 (UTC+4)	Hakob Loretsyan (yellow card) 42'; Aram Loretsyan 63'; Revik Yeghiazaryan (yellow card) 68'; Mher Sahakyan 72'	Report	Louis 2', 41', 56', 60'; Damčevski 9'; Avetisyan 17', 23'; Ambartsumyan (yellow card) 25'; Avanesyan 36', 81', 90+1'; Kobyalko 86'	Stadium: Dzoraghbyur Training Centre; Attendance: 30; Referee: Edgar Sahakyan

27 November 2019	Van	0–1	Noah	Charentsavan
14:00 (UTC+4)	Soslanbek Dzagoev (yellow card) 26'; Eza (yellow card) 37'	Report	Benik Hovhannisyan (yellow card) 61' (goal) 70'	Stadium: Charentsavan City Stadium; Attendance: 500; Referee: Ashot Ghaltakchyan

27 November 2019	Lori	0–1	Urartu	Vanadzor
14:30 (UTC+4)	Artur Avagyan (yellow card) 7'; Vardan Shahatuni (yellow card) 80'; Julius Ufuoma (red card) 87'; Luiz Matheus (yellow card) 90+3'	Report	Camara (yellow card) 7'; Kobzar 31' (yellow card) 84'; Jurica Grgec (yellow card) 80'; Anatoliy Ayvazov (yellow card) 90+3'	Stadium: Vanadzor Football Academy; Attendance: 200; Referee: Artur Safaryan

27 November 2019	Gandzasar Kapan	3–1	Alashkert	Yerevan
14:30 (UTC+4)	Aslanyan 8', 23' (yellow card) 89'; Hamlet Asoyan (red card) 64'; Gevorg Nranyan (yellow card) 65'; G.Harutyunyan 89'; Vardan Arzoyan (yellow card) 89'; Gevorg Ohanyan (yellow card) 90+1'	Report	Thiago Galvão 38' (yellow card) 90+3'; Aleksandar Glišić (yellow card) 43'; Marmentini (yellow card) 65'; Grigoryan (yellow card) 71'	Stadium: Yerevan Football Academy Stadium; Attendance: 50; Referee: Henrik Nalbandyan

== Semi–finals ==
Semi–final matches were played from 11 March to 24 June 2020.

11 March 2020 1st leg	Ararat-Armenia	1–0	Gandzasar Kapan	Yerevan
14:30	A.Khachumyan (yellow card) 19'; Louis 54'; Harutyunyan (yellow card) 69'; Čupić (yellow card) 90+3'	Report	D.Terteryan (yellow card) 43'; A.Adamyan (yellow card) 70'	Stadium: Yerevan Football Academy Stadium; Attendance: 300; Referee: Henrik Nalbandyan

24 June 2020 2nd leg	Gandzasar Kapan	0–2 (0–3 agg.)	Ararat-Armenia	Yerevan
19:45	An.Kocharyan (yellow card) 64'; D.Terteryan (yellow card) 70' (red card) 70'; Harutyunyan (yellow card) 72'; A.Hovhannisyan (yellow card) 77'	Report	Ângelo 30'; Christian (yellow card) 51'; Abakumov (yellow card) 85'; Gouffran 90'	Stadium: Yerevan Football Academy Stadium; Attendance: 0 Referee: Zaven Hovhannisyan

11 March 2020 1st leg	Urartu	0–1	Noah	Yerevan
18:00	Paderin (yellow card) 45+1'	Report	S.Gomes (yellow card) 23' (yellow-red card) 87'; A.Tatayev 30'; Spătaru (yellow card) 90+2'	Stadium: Urartu Stadium; Attendance: 1,000; Referee: Ashot Ghaltakchyan

24 June 2020 2nd leg	Noah	2–1 (3–1 agg.)	Urartu	Yerevan
17:30	Mayrovich 3' (pen.); Gareginyan (red card) 20'; H.Manga (yellow card) 44'; Lavrishchev 78'; V.Vimercati (yellow card) 78'; Kagermazov (yellow card) 78'; M.Shvagirev (yellow card) 82'	Report	P.Mutumosi (yellow card) 2'; Darbinyan (yellow card) 7'; Kobzar 23'; Paderin (yellow card) 79'; Ebert (yellow card) 83'	Stadium: Alashkert Stadium; Attendance: 0 Referee: Henrik Nalbandyan

== Final ==
10 July 2020
19:00 (UTC+4)

Noah	5–5 (a.e.t.)	Ararat-Armenia
Mayrovich 39', 60'; Kryuchkov (yellow card) 49'; Azarov 56' (pen.), 115' (pen.); Spătaru 67'; Kovalenko (yellow card) 106'; V. Movsisyan (yellow card) 113'	Report	Louis 8', 40'; A. Tatayev 23' (o.g.); Otubanjo 29', 117'; Achenteh (yellow card) 55'; Kobyalko (yellow card) 89'; Kódjo (red card) 90+3'; Čupić (yellow card) 120+2'
Penalties
K. Bor (penalty missed); Azarov (penalty scored); V. Avetisyan (penalty missed); Gareginyan (penalty scored); S. Dmitriev (penalty scored); Kovalenko (penalty scored); E.Grigoryan (penalty scored); Kryuchkov (penalty scored); R. Krusnauskas (penalty scored)	7–6	(penalty missed) A. Nahapetyan; (penalty scored) Kobyalko; (penalty scored) Ângelo; (penalty missed) Malakyan; (penalty scored) Otubanjo; (penalty scored) Sanogo; (penalty scored) Christian; (penalty scored) Guz; (penalty missed) Danielyan

Yerevan Football Academy Stadium, Yerevan
Attendance: 0
Referee: Zaven Hovhannisyan

== Scorers ==
As of match played 10 July 2020

8 goals:

- (Nigeria) Ogana Louis - Ararat-Armenia

5 goals:

- (Russia) Artyom Avanesyan - Ararat-Armenia

4 goals:

- (Russia) Maksim Mayrovich - Noah

3 goals:

- Stepan Harutyunyan - West Armenia

2 goals:

- (Brazil) Thiago Galvão - Alashkert
- Petros Avetisyan - Ararat-Armenia
- (Nigeria) Yusuf Otubanjo - Ararat-Armenia
- (Armenia) Narek Aslanyan - Gandzasar Kapan
- (Russia) Vladimir Azarov - Noah
- (Ukraine) Myroslav Deda - Torpedo Yerevan
- (Russia) Yevgeni Kobzar - Urartu
- (Russia) Nikita Andreyev - Van
- (Russia) Dzambolat Khastsayev - Van
- (Russia) Muslim Bammatgereev - Van

1 goals:

- (Armenia) David Ghandilyan - Alashkert
- (Ukraine) Artur Avahimyan - Alashkert
- (Russia) Anton Demenschin - Ani Yerevan
- Hovhannes Harutyunyan - Ararat-Armenia
- (France) Yoan Gouffran - Ararat-Armenia
- (North Macedonia) Aleksandar Damčevski - Ararat-Armenia
- (Portugal) Ângelo Meneses - Ararat-Armenia
- (Russia) Anton Kobyalko - Ararat-Armenia
- (Armenia) Gegham Harutyunyan - Gandzasar Kapan
- (Armenia) Mher Harutyunyan - Gandzasar Kapan
- (Ghana) Annan Mensah - Gandzasar Kapan
- (Armenia) Benik Hovhannisyan - Noah
- (Moldova) Dan Spătaru - Noah
- (Russia) Dmitri Lavrishchev - Noah
- (Russia) Alan Tatayev - Noah
- (Armenia) Aram Loretsyan - Sevan
- (Armenia) Areg Azatyan - Sevan
- (Armenia) Mher Sahakyan - Sevan
- (Ukraine) Bohdan Riabets - Sevan
- (Nigeria) Solomon Udo - Shirak
- (Armenia) Karen Avoyan - Torpedo Yerevan
- (Ivory Coast) Wilfried Eza - Van
- Mher Harutyunyan - West Armenia
- (Russia) Anton Kupchin - West Armenia
- (Russia) Mikhail Zhabkin - West Armenia
- (Russia) Andrei Zorin - West Armenia

Own goals:

- (Russia) Roman Muradyan (6 September 2019 vs Torpedo Yerevan)
- (Russia) Denis Volkov (3 November 2019 vs Ararat-Armenia)
- (Russia) Alan Tatayev (10 July 2020 vs Ararat-Armenia)

== See also ==
- 2019–20 Armenian Premier League
