= 2019–20 FC Ararat-Armenia season =

Ararat-Armenia
2019–20 season
- Director: Poghos Galstyan
- Manager: Vardan Minasyan
- Stadium: Republican Stadium; FFA Academy Stadium
- Premier League: 1st
- Armenian Cup: Runners-up
- Armenian Supercup: Champions
- UEFA Champions League: First Qualifying Round vs AIK
- UEFA Europa League: Playoff round vs Dudelange
- Top goalscorer: League: Mailson Lima (8); All: Ogana Louis (14)
| Home colours | Away colours |

The 2019–20 season was a FC Ararat-Armenia's 2nd season in Armenian Premier League, of which they were defending champions. Ararat-Armenia finished the season as Armenian Premier League Champions for the second year in a row and were Runners-up to FC Noah in the Armenian Cup. In Europe, AIK knocked them out of the UEFA Champions League in the first qualifying round, resulting in Ararat-Armenia dropping into the UEFA Europa League, where they reached the playoff round before defeat to Dudelange.

== Season events ==
On 18 June, Ararat-Armenia were drawn against Allsvenskan Champions AIK in the first qualifying round of the UEFA Champions League. The following day, 19 June, Ararat-Armenia announced the signing of Ângelo Meneses. On 20 June, Sergi left Ararat-Armenia after his contract expired, whilst Aleksey Pustozyorov and Giovanny Martínez left the club after their contracts where ended by mutual consent. On 24 June, Ararat-Armenia announced their second signing of the summer, with Ilja Antonov joining from Hermannstadt, with Rochdi Achenteh signing the following day, and Furdjel Narsingh signed on 26 June. Zakaria Sanogo signed for Ararat-Armenia on 5 July, with Ararat-Armenia winning their first ever European match on 9 July, a 2–1 victory over AIK at home with Petros Avetisyan scoring both goals. On 13 July, David Davidyan left Ararat-Armenia by mutual consent, whilst Ararat-Armenia traveled to Stockholm to face AIK at the Friends Arena on 17 July, losing 3–1 on the night and 4–3 on aggregate, dropping them into the UEFA Europa League qualifying stages. After dropping into the UEFA Europa League Second qualifying round, Ararat-Armenia were drawn against Lincoln Red Imps of the Gibraltar National League. The first leg took place at the Republican Stadium in Yerevan on 23 July, finishing 2–0 to Ararat-Armenia after goals from Anton Kobyalko and Kódjo. The return leg took place on 30 July at the Victoria Stadium in Gibraltar, with Ararat-Armenia running out 2-1 winners, 4–1 on aggregate, with both goals coming from Ogana Louis.

On 31 December, Ararat-Armenia announced the signing of Marcos Pizzelli, however on 11 January, Ararat-Armenia and Pizzelli announced that he was retiring for football due to injury. On 12 January, Petros Avetisyan moved to FC Tobol.

On 1 February, Ararat-Armenia announced the signing of Yoan Gouffran.

On 12 March 2020, the Football Federation of Armenia announced that all Armenian Premier League games had been postponed until 23 March, and that the Armenian Cup Semifinal second legs had also been postponed due to the COVID-19 pandemic.

== Squad ==
As of match played 14 July 2020

| Number | Name | Nationality | Position | Date of birth (age) | Signed from | Signed in | Contract ends | Apps. | Goals |
Goalkeepers
| 1 | Suren Aloyan | (Armenia) | GK | 10 August 1997 (aged 22) | Youth Team | 2019 | | 0 | 0 |
| 33 | Dmitry Abakumov | (Russia) | GK | 8 July 1989 (aged 31) | Luch Vladivostok | 2018 | | 60 | 0 |
| 44 | Stefan Čupić | (Serbia) | GK | 7 May 1994 (aged 26) | Voždovac | 2019 | | 17 | 0 |
Defenders
| 3 | Ângelo Meneses | (Portugal) | DF | 3 July 1993 (aged 27) | Famalicão | 2019 | | 36 | 2 |
| 4 | Albert Khachumyan | (Armenia) | DF | 23 June 1999 (aged 21) | Youth Team | 2017 | | 41 | 4 |
| 15 | Dmitry Guz | (Russia) | DF | 15 May 1988 (aged 32) | Tyumen | 2018 | | 60 | 4 |
| 20 | Rochdi Achenteh | (Morocco) | DF | 7 March 1988 (aged 32) | FC Eindhoven | 2019 | | 25 | 0 |
| 21 | Aleksandar Damčevski | (North Macedonia) | DF | 21 November 1992 (aged 27) | Ermis Aradippou | 2018 | | 35 | 1 |
| 22 | Artur Danielyan | (Armenia) | DF | 9 February 1998 (aged 22) | Stal Kamianske | 2019 | | 35 | 2 |
| 93 | Alex Christian | (Haiti) | DF | 5 December 1993 (aged 26) | Gandzasar Kapan | 2019 | | 39 | 0 |
Midfielders
| 7 | Armen Nahapetyan | (Armenia) | MF | 24 July 1999 (aged 20) | Pyunik | 2017 | | 55 | 12 |
| 8 | Gor Malakyan | (Armenia) | MF | 12 June 1994 (aged 26) | Stal Kamianske | 2018 | | 50 | 0 |
| 9 | Yoan Gouffran | (France) | MF | 25 May 1986 (aged 34) | | 2020 | | 15 | 1 |
| 10 | Armen Ambartsumyan | (Russia) | MF | 11 April 1994 (aged 26) | Fakel Voronezh | 2018 | | 56 | 3 |
| 11 | Hovhannes Harutyunyan | (Armenia) | MF | 25 May 1999 (aged 21) | Zemplín Michalovce | 2019 | | 26 | 6 |
| 23 | Aram Khamoyan | (Armenia) | MF | 10 January 2000 (aged 20) | Lokomotiv Yerevan | 2019 | | 0 | 0 |
| 25 | Davit Nalbandyan | (Armenia) | MF | 9 August 1999 (aged 20) | Youth Team | 2017 | | 26 | 0 |
| 27 | Furdjel Narsingh | (Netherlands) | MF | 13 March 1988 (aged 32) | De Graafschap | 2019 | | 31 | 4 |
| 63 | Kódjo | (Ivory Coast) | MF | 28 May 1993 (aged 27) | Feirense | 2019 | | 49 | 3 |
| 67 | Ilja Antonov | (Estonia) | MF | 5 December 1992 (aged 27) | Hermannstadt | 2019 | | 29 | 1 |
| 79 | Serhiy Vakulenko | (Ukraine) | MF | 7 September 1993 (aged 26) | Karpaty Lviv | 2020 | | 12 | 3 |
| 94 | Mailson Lima | (Cape Verde) | MF | 29 May 1994 (aged 26) | Viitorul Constanța | 2019 | | 54 | 12 |
Forwards
| 17 | Zakaria Sanogo | (Burkina Faso) | FW | 11 December 1996 (aged 23) | Rahimo | 2019 | | 36 | 3 |
| 18 | Artyom Avanesyan | (Russia) | FW | 17 July 1999 (aged 20) | Ararat Moscow | 2018 | | 21 | 5 |
| 19 | Narek Alaverdyan | (Armenia) | FW | 19 February 2002 (aged 18) | Youth Team | 2019 | | 2 | 0 |
| 24 | Yusuf Otubanjo | (Nigeria) | FW | 12 September 1992 (aged 27) | LASK | 2020 | | 16 | 9 |
| 32 | Anton Kobyalko | (Russia) | FW | 14 May 1986 (aged 34) | Baltika Kaliningrad | 2018 | | 66 | 30 |
| 99 | Ogana Louis | (Nigeria) | FW | 29 December 1995 (aged 24) | Žalgiris | 2019 | | 42 | 17 |
Away on loan
| 11 | Zhirayr Shaghoyan | (Armenia) | MF | 10 April 2001 (aged 19) | Youth Team | 2017 | | 34 | 8 |
Left during the season
| 6 | Georgi Pashov | (Bulgaria) | DF | 4 March 1990 (aged 30) | Etar | 2018 | | 45 | 2 |
| 12 | Nikos Melikyan | (Armenia) | GK | 2 March 1999 (aged 21) | Youth Team | 2017 | | 25 | 0 |
| 77 | Petros Avetisyan | (Armenia) | MF | 7 January 1996 (aged 24) | Pyunik | 2019 | | 39 | 14 |
| 97 | David Davidyan | (Russia) | FW | 14 December 1997 (aged 22) | Ararat Moscow | 2019 | | 3 | 0 |
| | Marcos Pizzelli | (Armenia) | FW | 3 October 1984 (aged 35) | Aktobe | 2019 | | 0 | 0 |
| | Jean-Jacques Bougouhi | (Ivory Coast) | FW | 12 June 1992 (aged 28) | Shirak | 2019 | | 7 | 3 |

=== Out on loan ===
Note: Flags indicate national team as defined under FIFA eligibility rules; some limited exceptions apply. Players may hold more than one non-FIFA nationality.

| No. | Pos. | Nation | Player |
|---|---|---|---|
| — | MF | ARM | Zhirayr Shaghoyan (at BKMA Yerevan) |

== Transfers ==
=== In ===
| Date | Position | Nationality | Name | From | Fee | Ref. |
|---|---|---|---|---|---|---|
| 19 June 2019 | DF | (Portugal) | Ângelo Meneses | Famalicão | Undisclosed | |
| 24 June 2019 | MF | (Estonia) | Ilja Antonov | Hermannstadt | Undisclosed | |
| 25 June 2019 | DF | (Morocco) | Rochdi Achenteh | FC Eindhoven | Undisclosed | |
| 27 June 2019 | MF | (Netherlands) | Furdjel Narsingh | De Graafschap | Undisclosed | |
| 5 July 2019 | FW | (Burkina Faso) | Zakaria Sanogo | Rahimo | Undisclosed | |
| 31 December 2019 | FW | (Armenia) | Marcos Pizzelli | Aktobe | Free | |
| 23 January 2020 | FW | (Nigeria) | Yusuf Otubanjo | LASK | Undisclosed | |
| 29 January 2020 | MF | (Ukraine) | Serhiy Vakulenko | Karpaty Lviv | Undisclosed | |
| 1 February 2020 | MF | (France) | Yoan Gouffran | | Free | |

=== Out ===
| Date | Position | Nationality | Name | To | Fee | Ref. |
|---|---|---|---|---|---|---|
| Summer 2019 | FW | (Bulgaria) | Ivaylo Dimitrov | Arda Kardzhali | Undisclosed | |
| 12 January 2020 | MF | (Armenia) | Petros Avetisyan | Tobol | Undisclosed | |
| 15 January 2020 | MF | (Armenia) | Erik Azizyan | Pyunik | Undisclosed | |

=== Loans out ===
| Date from | Position | Nationality | Name | To | Date to | Ref. |
|---|---|---|---|---|---|---|
| Summer 2019 | MF | (Armenia) | Zhirayr Shaghoyan | BKMA Yerevan | End of 2020/21 Season | |

=== Released ===
| Date | Position | Nationality | Name | Joined | Date | Ref |
|---|---|---|---|---|---|---|
| 20 June 2019 | DF | (Spain) | Sergi | Alavés | | |
| 20 June 2019 | MF | (Russia) | Aleksey Pustozyorov | Slutsk | | |
| 20 June 2019 | MF | (Colombia) | Giovanny Martínez | Rionegro Águilas | | |
| 13 July 2019 | FW | (Russia) | David Davidyan | Ararat Yerevan | 18 July 2019 | |
| 11 January 2020 | FW | (Armenia) | Marcos Pizzelli | Retired | | |
| 23 January 2020 | DF | (Bulgaria) | Georgi Pashov | Zhetysu | 26 January 2020 | |
| 30 June 2020 | FW | (Ivory Coast) | Jean-Jacques Bougouhi | Al-Mina'a | 5 October 2020 | |
| 18 July 2020 | DF | (Morocco) | Rochdi Achenteh | Kozakken Boys | 6 July 2021 | |
| 19 July 2020 | DF | (Russia) | Dmitry Guz | Urartu | 21 July 2020 | |
| 20 July 2020 | FW | (Russia) | Anton Kobyalko | Pyunik | 24 July 2020 | |

== Friendlies ==
| 23 June 2019 | Ararat-Armenia | 5 – 0 | (Belarus) Sputnik Rechitsa | Gomel, Belarus |
| 18:00 (UTC+4) | Davidyan; Louis; A.Nahapetyan; Shaghoyan; Damčevski | Report |

| 29 June 2019 | Ararat-Armenia | 0 – 0 | (Ukraine) Desna Chernihiv | Gomel, Belarus |
| 19:00 (UTC+4) | | Report |

| 3 July 2019 | Ararat-Armenia | 3 – 0 | (Belarus) Gomel | Gomel, Belarus |
| 13:00 (UTC+4) | Guz; Avetisyan; Mailson | Report |

| 26 January 2020 | Ararat-Armenia | 9 – 1 | (Cyprus) Akritas Chlorakas | Paphos, Cyprus |
| (UTC+4) | Sanogo; Ângelo; A.Nahapetyan; Malakyan; Harutyunyan; Achenteh; Mailson; Otubanjo | Report | Goal |

| 26 January 2020 | Ararat-Armenia | 1 – 0 | (Cyprus) Team Pafos | Paphos, Cyprus |
| (UTC+4) | Kódjo | Report |

| 2 February 2020 | Ararat-Armenia | 3 – 1 | (Romania) Universitatea Cluj | Paphos, Cyprus |
| (UTC+4) | Kobyalko (pen.); A.Nahapetyan (o.g.) | Report | Goal |

| 2 February 2020 | Ararat-Armenia | 1 – 1 | (Russia) Ural Yekaterinburg | Paphos, Cyprus |
| 19:00 (UTC+4) | Otubanjo 26' | Report | Bicfalvi 36' (pen.) |

| 11 February 2020 | Ararat-Armenia | 2 – 1 | (Russia) Ufa | Larnaca, Cyprus |
| 13:15 (UTC+4) | Lima 8'; Otubanjo 81' | Report | Bizjak 57' |

| 11 February 2020 | Ararat-Armenia | 7 – 2 | (Cyprus) Ayia Napa | Larnaca, Cyprus |
| 17:00 (UTC+4) | Louis; Avanesyan; Harutyunyan; Kobyalko | Report | Goal |

| 17 February 2020 | Ararat-Armenia | 0 – 0 | (Russia) Tekstilshchik Ivanovo | Larnaca, Cyprus |
| (UTC+4) | | Report |

| 20 February 2020 | Ararat-Armenia | 2 – 1 | (Latvia) Liepāja | Larnaca, Cyprus |
| 15:00 (UTC+4) | Sanogo; Kobyalko | Report |

| 7 May 2020 | Ararat-Armenia | 1 – 1 | Van | Yerevan |
| 12:00 (UTC+4) | Louis | | Goal | Stadium: FFA Academy Stadium; Attendance: 0 |

| 14 May 2020 | Alashkert | 2 – 2 | Ararat-Armenia | Yerevan |
| 12:00 (UTC+4) | Thiago Galvão; Marmentini | Report | Lima | Stadium: Alashkert Stadium; Attendance: 0 |

| 14 May 2020 | Ararat-Armenia | 4 – 1 | Lokomotiv Yerevan | Yerevan |
| 16:30 (UTC+4) | Louis; N.Alaverdyan | Report | Goal | Stadium: FFA Academy Stadium; Attendance: 0 |

== Competitions ==
=== Overall record ===
| Competition | First match | Last match | Starting round | Final position | Record | | | | | | | |
| Competition | First match | Last match | Starting round | Final position | Pld | W | D | L | GF | GA | GD | Win % |
|---|---|---|---|---|---|---|---|---|---|---|---|---|
| Premier League | 10 August 2019 | 14 July 2020 | Matchday 1 | Winners | 28 | 15 | 7 | 6 | 45 | 23 | +22 | 53.57 |
| Armenian Cup | 3 November 2019 | 10 July 2020 | Second round | Runners-up | 5 | 4 | 1 | 0 | 24 | 7 | +17 | 80.00 |
| Armenian Supercup | 24 September 2019 | | Final | Winners | 1 | 1 | 0 | 0 | 3 | 2 | +1 | 100.00 |
| UEFA Champions League | 9 July 2019 | 17 July 2019 | First qualifying round | First qualifying round | 2 | 1 | 0 | 1 | 3 | 4 | −1 | 50.00 |
| UEFA Europa League | 23 July 2019 | 29 August 2019 | Second qualifying round | Playoff Round | 6 | 4 | 0 | 2 | 10 | 6 | +4 | 66.67 |
| Total | | | | | 42 | 25 | 8 | 9 | 85 | 42 | +43 | 59.52 |

Last updated: 14 July 2020
Source: Competitions

=== Armenian Supercup ===
| 24 September 2019 | Ararat-Armenia | 3 – 2 (a.e.t.) | Alashkert | Yerevan |
| 19:00 (UTC+4) | A.Nahapetyan 27'; Sanogo (yellow card) 48'; Danielyan 90+3'; Mailson 110' | Report | Marmentini 24' (yellow card) 36'; M.Manasyan 65'; Daghbashyan (yellow card) 78'; Voskanyan (yellow card) 120+1' | Stadium: Republican Stadium; Attendance: 1,000; Referee: Gevorg Eghoyan |

=== Premier League ===
==== Regular season ====
===== Results summary =====
| Overall | | | | | | | | Home | | | | | | Away | | | | | |
| Pld | W | D | L | GF | GA | GD | Pts | W | D | L | GF | GA | GD | W | D | L | GF | GA | GD |
|---|---|---|---|---|---|---|---|---|---|---|---|---|---|---|---|---|---|---|---|
| 18 | 11 | 3 | 4 | 33 | 14 | +19 | 36 | 7 | 2 | 0 | 20 | 4 | +16 | 4 | 1 | 4 | 13 | 10 | +3 |

Last updated: 23 May 2020.
Source: See Results

===== Results =====
| 10 August 2019 2 | Ararat-Armenia | 3 – 1 | Gandzasar Kapan | Yerevan |
| 19:30 (UTC+4) | Christian (yellow card) 70'; Avetisyan 73' (pen.); Ângelo (yellow card) 79'; Louis 84'; Mailson 89' | Report | D.Minasyan 30'; A.Adamyan (yellow card) 49'; Ar.Hovhannisyan (yellow card) 58' (yellow-red card) 90+2'; D.Terteryan (yellow card) 62'; G.Ohanyan (yellow card) 67'; Al.Hovhannisyan (yellow card) 76' | Stadium: FFA Academy Stadium; Attendance: 500; Referee: Henrik Nalbandyan |

| 18 August 2019 3 | Noah | 1 – 2 | Ararat-Armenia | Yerevan |
| 17:15 (UTC+4) | A.Tatayev (yellow card) 33'; Mayrovich 83' | Report | Ambartsumyan 47'; Mailson 74'; Guz (yellow card) 82' | Stadium: Alashkert Stadium; Attendance: 400; Referee: Zaven Hovhannisyan |
Note: Match played at the Alashkert Stadium in Yerevan, instead of Gandzasar Kapan regular Gandzasar Stadium in Kapan.

| 25 August 2019 4 | Yerevan | 1 – 2 | Ararat-Armenia | Yerevan |
| 19:00 (UTC+4) | A.Portugalyan (yellow card) 64'; Isayev 90+3' | Report | Guz 9'; Louis 29' | Stadium: FFA Academy Stadium; Attendance: 150; Referee: Artur Safaryan |

| 13 September 2019 6 | Urartu | 1 – 1 | Ararat-Armenia | Yerevan |
| 19:15 (UTC+4) | Budnik 34'; Mutumosi (yellow card) 48'; Darbinyan (yellow card) 54' | Report | Ângelo (yellow card) 83'; Louis 85' | Stadium: Urartu Stadium; Attendance: 620; Referee: Suren Baliyan |

| 18 September 2019 7 | Ararat-Armenia | 1 – 0 | Ararat Yerevan | Yerevan |
| 17:30 (UTC+4) | Mailson (yellow card) 25' (goal) 66' | Report | Davidyan (yellow card) 41'; Morozov (yellow card) 51'; Kozlov (yellow card) 61'; Aleksanyan (yellow card) 82' | Stadium: FFA Academy Stadium; Attendance: 300; Referee: Zaven Hovhannisyan |

| 21 September 2019 8 | Shirak | 1 – 0 | Ararat-Armenia | Gyumri |
| 16:00 (UTC+4) | M.Kone 29'; M.Bakayoko (yellow card) 44'; Udo (yellow card) 90+1' | Report | Pashov (yellow card) 85' | Stadium: Gyumri City Stadium; Attendance: 1,000; Referee: Suren Baliyan |

| 30 September 2019 9 | Ararat-Armenia | 3 – 1 | Pyunik | Yerevan |
| 19:00 (UTC+4) | Mailson 19'; Pashov (yellow card) 31'; Guz (yellow card) 39'; Kobyalko 58'; Achenteh (yellow card) 65'; Avetisyan 70' | Report | Özbiliz 6' (yellow card) 10'; Vardanyan (yellow card) 86' | Stadium: FFA Academy Stadium; Attendance: 900; Referee: Henrik Nalbandyan |

| 5 October 2019 10 | Ararat-Armenia | 2 – 0 | Alashkert | Yerevan |
| 15:00 (UTC+4) | Avetisyan 32'; Pashov (yellow card) 45+3'; Achenteh (yellow card) 78'; Kódjo (yellow card) 85'; Mailson 88' | Report | Voskanyan (yellow card) 77'; Marmentini (yellow card) 85' | Stadium: FFA Academy Stadium; Attendance: 400; Referee: Suren Baliyan |

| 21 October 2019 11 | Gandzasar Kapan | 2 – 1 | Ararat-Armenia | Yerevan |
| 16:00 (UTC+4) | G.Harutyunyan 9' (yellow card) 75'; Wbeymar (yellow card) 44'; Ar.Hovhannisyan (yellow card) 45+1'; D.Minasyan 89'; A.Kocharyan (yellow card) 89' | Report | Antonov (yellow card) 25' (yellow-red card) 31'; Guz 57' | Stadium: Yerevan Football Academy; Attendance: 300; Referee: Zaven Hovhannisyan |
Note: Match played at the Yerevan Football Academy in Yerevan, instead of Gandzasar Kapan regular Gandzasar Stadium in Kapan.

| 25 October 2019 12 | Ararat-Armenia | 3 – 1 | Noah | Yerevan |
| 16:00 (UTC+4) | Guz 45'; Avetisyan (yellow card) 53'; Narsingh 78'; Kobyalko 90+3' | Report | Mayrovich 80'; Bor (yellow card) 81' | Stadium: FFA Academy Stadium; Attendance: 450; Referee: Ashot Ghaltakchyan |

| 29 October 2019 1 | Alashkert | 2 – 1 | Ararat-Armenia | Yerevan |
| 15:00 (UTC+4) | Glišić (yellow card) 7' (goal) 89'; N.Tankov 37'; Voskanyan (yellow card) 47'; Daghbashyan (yellow card) 80' | Report | Sanogo 29'; Malakyan (yellow card) 34'; Danielyan (yellow card) 68'; Kódjo (yellow card) 72' | Stadium: Alashkert Stadium; Attendance: 400; Referee: Artur Safaryan |
Note: Match originally scheduled for 4 August 2019.

| 6 November 2019 5 | Ararat-Armenia | 0 – 0 | Lori | Yerevan |
| 16:00 (UTC+4) | Sanogo (yellow card) 8'; Ângelo (yellow card) 48'; Guz (yellow card) 59' (yellow-red card) 73' | Report | J.Ufuoma (yellow card) 34' (yellow-red card) 77'; X.Auzmendi (yellow card) 80' | Stadium: FFA Academy Stadium; Attendance: 300; Referee: Gevorg Eghoyan |
Note: Match originally scheduled for 30 August 2019.

| 10 November 2019 13 | Ararat-Armenia | 7 – 2 | Yerevan | Yerevan |
| 15:00 (UTC+4) | Kódjo 12' (yellow card) 39'; Ambartsumyan 25'; Kobyalko 26', 56'; Narsingh 50'; Sanogo 85'; Ângelo 90' | Report | Isayev (yellow card) 21' (goal) 29'; Y.Yevgenyev (yellow card) 39'; A.Portugalyan 60'; J.Del Portillo (yellow card) 68' | Stadium: FFA Academy Stadium; Attendance: 200; Referee: Artush Kerobyan |

| 23 November 2019 14 | Lori | 2 – 0 | Ararat-Armenia | Vanadzor |
| 14:00 (UTC+4) | Zayerko 11'; Diakité (yellow card) 34'; Alexis (yellow card) 45+2'; Luiz Matheus 68' | Report | Kódjo (yellow card) 32'; Malakyan (yellow card) 45+2'; Avetisyan (yellow card) 56'; Sanogo (yellow card) 86' | Stadium: Vanadzor Football Academy; Attendance: 165; Referee: Zaven Hovhannisyan |

| 1 December 2019 15 | Ararat-Armenia | 0 – 0 | Urartu | Yerevan |
| 15:00 (UTC+4) | Ambartsumyan (yellow card) 10'; Avanesyan (yellow card) 90+1' | Report | Sinyavsky (yellow card) 90+3' | Stadium: FFA Academy Stadium; Attendance: 200; Referee: Suren Baliyan |

| 2 March 2020 16 | Ararat Yerevan | 0 – 3 | Ararat-Armenia | Yerevan |
| 14:45 (UTC+4) | James (yellow card) 77' | Report | Otubanjo 7', 17'; Ambartsumyan 35' (yellow card) 84' | Stadium: Republican Stadium; Attendance: 300; Referee: George Vadatchkoria |

| 7 March 2020 17 | Ararat-Armenia | 1 – 0 | Shirak | Yerevan |
| 15:00 (UTC+4) | Vakulenko (yellow card) 28'; Ambartsumyan (yellow card) 38'; Danielyan (yellow card) 43'; Narsingh 71' | Report | Mkoyan (yellow card) 63'; M.Kone (yellow card) 79'; A.Gevorkyan (yellow card) 88' | Stadium: FFA Academy Stadium; Attendance: 500; Referee: Ashot Ghaltakchyan |

| 23 May 2020 18 | Pyunik | 0 – 3 | Ararat-Armenia | Yerevan |
| 15:15 (UTC+4) | E.Azizyan (yellow card) 77' | Report | Otubanjo 21' (pen.); Sanogo 23'; Sugrobov 30' (o.g.) | Stadium: FFA Academy Stadium; Attendance: 0 Referee: Artur Safaryan |
Note: Match played behind closed doors. Match was originally scheduled for 17 March, but postponed on 13 March due to the COVID-19 pandemic.

===== Table =====
| Pos | Team | Pld | W | D | L | GF | GA | GD | Pts | Qualification |
|---|---|---|---|---|---|---|---|---|---|---|
| 1 | Ararat-Armenia | 18 | 11 | 3 | 4 | 33 | 15 | +18 | 36 | Qualification for the Championship round |
| 2 | Lori | 18 | 9 | 5 | 4 | 27 | 19 | +8 | 32 | Qualification for the Championship round |
| 3 | Alashkert | 18 | 9 | 4 | 5 | 33 | 20 | +13 | 31 | Qualification for the Championship round |
| 4 | Ararat | 18 | 9 | 4 | 5 | 25 | 18 | +7 | 31 | Qualification for the Championship round |
| 5 | Noah | 18 | 9 | 3 | 6 | 25 | 19 | +6 | 30 | Qualification for the Championship round |
| 6 | Shirak | 18 | 8 | 4 | 6 | 25 | 18 | +7 | 28 | Qualification for the Championship round |
| 7 | Pyunik | 18 | 7 | 2 | 9 | 35 | 36 | −1 | 23 | Qualification for the Relegation round |
| 8 | Urartu | 18 | 6 | 5 | 7 | 22 | 24 | −2 | 23 | Qualification for the Relegation round |
| 9 | Gandzasar | 18 | 4 | 6 | 8 | 20 | 25 | −5 | 18 | Qualification for the Relegation round |
| 10 | Yerevan (R, D) | 18 | 0 | 0 | 18 | 11 | 62 | −51 | 0 | Withdrawn |

Source: Soccerway
Rules for classification: 1) Points; 2) Play-off (only if deciding champion); 3) Matches won; 4) Head-to-head points; 5) Head-to-head matches won; 6) Head-to-head goal difference; 7) Head-to-head goals scored; 8) Head-to-head away goals scored; 9) Goal difference; 10) Goals scored.
(D) Disqualified; (R) Relegated

==== Championship round ====
===== Results summary =====
| Overall | | | | | | | | Home | | | | | | Away | | | | | |
| Pld | W | D | L | GF | GA | GD | Pts | W | D | L | GF | GA | GD | W | D | L | GF | GA | GD |
|---|---|---|---|---|---|---|---|---|---|---|---|---|---|---|---|---|---|---|---|
| 10 | 4 | 4 | 2 | 12 | 8 | +4 | 16 | 2 | 3 | 0 | 7 | 3 | +4 | 2 | 1 | 2 | 5 | 5 | 0 |

Last updated: 14 July 2020.
Source: See Results

===== Results =====
| 30 May 2020 19 | Ararat-Armenia | 1 – 1 | Shirak | Yerevan |
| 19:15 (UTC+4) | Malakyan (yellow card) 8'; Vakulenko 37'; Mailson (yellow card) 65'; Danielyan (yellow card) 75' | Report | R.Mkrtchyan 8'; Miličić (yellow card) 32' | Stadium: FFA Academy Stadium; Attendance: 0 Referee: Henrik Nalbandyan |
Note: Match played behind closed doors due to the COVID-19 pandemic.

| 3 June 2020 20 | Ararat-Armenia | 0 – 0 | Lori | Yerevan |
| 18:30 (UTC+4) | Kódjo (yellow card); Ângelo (yellow card) 74'; Gouffran (yellow card) | Report | A.Yeoule (yellow card) 25' (yellow-red card) 60'; X.Auzmendi (yellow card) 68'; M.Manasyan (yellow card) 90+1' | Stadium: FFA Academy Stadium; Attendance: 0 Referee: Henrik Nalbandyan |
Note: Match played behind closed doors due to the COVID-19 pandemic.

| 8 June 2020 21 | Alashkert | 1 – 2 | Ararat-Armenia | Yerevan |
| 17:30 (UTC+4) | Miljković (yellow card) 57'; Glišić 59' | Report | Otubanjo 11'; Antonov (yellow card) 56'; Mailson 66' (pen.) (yellow card) 79'; Abakumov (yellow card) 90+3' | Stadium: Alashkert Stadium; Attendance: 0 Referee: Zaven Hovhannisyan |
Note: Match played behind closed doors due to the COVID-19 pandemic.

| 11 June 2020 22 | Ararat-Armenia | 4 – 2 | Ararat Yerevan | Yerevan |
| 19:30 (UTC+4) | Vakulenko 22'; Harutyunyan (yellow card) 39'; Mailson 45', 90+4' (yellow card) 68'; Otubanjo 51' (pen.) (yellow card) 63'; Christian (yellow card) 72'; Malakyan (yellow card) 85' | Report | Dedechko 11'; Stepanets (yellow card) 41'; James (yellow card) 48'; Gouffran 56' (o.g.); Spychka (yellow card) 61'; Khurtsidze (yellow card) 90+4' | Stadium: FFA Academy Stadium; Attendance: 0 Referee: Artur Safaryan |
Note: Match played behind closed doors due to the COVID-19 pandemic.

| 15 June 2020 23 | Noah | 1 – 1 | Ararat-Armenia | Yerevan |
| 17:30 (UTC+4) | Kovalenko 7' (yellow card) 90+1'; Spătaru (yellow card) 52' | Report | Vakulenko 17'; Sanogo (yellow card) 34'; Malakyan (yellow card) 37' | Stadium: Alashkert Stadium; Attendance: 0 Referee: Ashot Ghaltakchyan |
Note: Match played behind closed doors due to the COVID-19 pandemic.

| 20 June 2020 24 | Shirak | 1 – 0 | Ararat-Armenia | Gyumri |
| 17:30 (UTC+4) | M.Kone 35'; Malakyan (yellow card) 72' | Report | Danielyan (yellow card) 40'; Kódjo (yellow card) 44'; Ambartsumyan (yellow card) 90+3'; Kobyalko (yellow card) 90+5'; Abakumov (yellow card) 90+7' | Stadium: Gyumri City Stadium; Attendance: 0 Referee: Henrik Nalbandyan |
Note: Match played behind closed doors due to the COVID-19 pandemic.

| 28 June 2020 25 | Lori | 2 – 1 | Ararat-Armenia | Vanadzor |
| 17:30 (UTC+4) | Alexis (yellow card) 42'; Désiré 72' (pen.); A.Yeoule (yellow card) 87'; A.Oura (yellow card) 89'; M.Manasyan 90+5' | Report | Alexis 14' (o.g.); Damčevski (yellow card) 56' (yellow-red card) 62' | Stadium: Vanadzor Football Academy; Attendance: 0 |
Note: Match played behind closed doors due to the COVID-19 pandemic.

| 2 July 2020 26 | Ararat-Armenia | 0 – 0 | Alashkert | Yerevan |
| 20:00 (UTC+4) | Kódjo (yellow card) 4' (yellow-red card) 77'; A.Khachumyan (yellow card) 80'; Malakyan (yellow card) 82'; Gouffran (yellow card) 90' | Report | Baranov (yellow card) 16' (yellow-red card) 90+2'; Gome (yellow card) 28'; Marmentini (yellow card) 67'; V.Hayrapetyan (yellow card) 84' | Stadium: FFA Academy Stadium; Attendance: 0 Referee: Henrik Nalbandyan |
Note: Match played behind closed doors due to the COVID-19 pandemic.

| 6 July 2020 27 | Ararat Yerevan | 0 – 1 | Ararat-Armenia | Yerevan |
| 20:00 (UTC+4) | Spychka (yellow card) 7'; Stepanets (yellow card) 45'; James (yellow card) 52'; Revyakin (yellow card) 85' | Report | Malakyan (yellow card) 48'; Gouffran (yellow card) 49'; A.Khachumyan (yellow card) 67'; Otubanjo 88'; Antonov (yellow card) 90+5' | Stadium: FFA Academy Stadium; Attendance: 0 Referee: Ashot Ghaltakchyan |
Note: Match played behind closed doors due to the COVID-19 pandemic.

| 14 July 2020 28 | Ararat-Armenia | 2 – 0 | Noah | Yerevan |
| 17:30 (UTC+4) | Narsingh 16'; Otubanjo 45'; Damčevski (yellow card) 52'; A.Khachumyan (yellow card) 57' | Report | Kryuchkov (yellow card) 35'; Spătaru (yellow card) 83' | Stadium: FFA Academy Stadium; Attendance: 0 Referee: Henrik Nalbandyan |
Note: Match played behind closed doors due to the COVID-19 pandemic.

===== Table =====
| Pos | Team | Pld | W | D | L | GF | GA | GD | Pts | Qualification |
|---|---|---|---|---|---|---|---|---|---|---|
| 1 | Ararat-Armenia (C) | 28 | 15 | 7 | 6 | 45 | 23 | +22 | 52 | Qualification for the Champions League first qualifying round |
| 2 | Noah | 28 | 14 | 6 | 8 | 37 | 27 | +10 | 48 | Qualification for the Europa League first qualifying round (Note: team qualified for the Europa League first qualifying round by winning the 2019–20 Armenian Cup.) |
| 3 | Alashkert | 28 | 14 | 5 | 9 | 51 | 31 | +20 | 47 | Qualification for the Europa League first qualifying round |
| 4 | Shirak | 28 | 13 | 7 | 8 | 40 | 30 | +10 | 46 | Qualification for the Europa League first qualifying round |
| 5 | Lori | 27 | 10 | 10 | 7 | 35 | 33 | +2 | 40 | (Note: Match between Lori and Ararat Yerevan was cancelled on 10 July, with no points being awarded.) |
| 6 | Ararat | 27 | 9 | 6 | 12 | 31 | 36 | −5 | 33 | (Note: Match between Lori and Ararat Yerevan was cancelled on 10 July, with no points being awarded.) |

Source: Soccerway
Rules for classification: 1) Points; 2) Play-off (only if deciding champion); 3) Matches won; 4) Head-to-head points; 5) Head-to-head matches won; 6) Head-to-head goal difference; 7) Head-to-head goals scored; 8) Head-to-head away goals scored; 9) Goal difference; 10) Goals scored.
(C) Champions

=== Armenian Cup ===
| 3 November 2019 Second Round | West Armenia | 0 – 5 | Ararat-Armenia | Dzoraghbyur |
| 14:30 (UTC+4) | G.Dzhigkayev (yellow card) 30'; Kharatyan (yellow card) 56' | Report | Louis 9'; Avanesyan 38', 89'; Harutyunyan 74'; Volkov 84' (o.g.) | Stadium: Dzoraghbyur Training Centre; Attendance: 60; Referee: Edgar Sahakyan |

| 27 November 2019 Quarterfinal | Sevan | 2 – 11 | Ararat-Armenia | Dzoraghbyur |
| 14:00 (UTC+4) | H.Loretsyan (yellow card) 42'; A.Loretsyan 63'; R.Yeghiazaryan (yellow card) 68'; M.Sahakyan 72' | Report | Louis 2', 41', 56', 60'; Damčevski 9'; Avetisyan 17', 23'; Ambartsumyan (yellow card) 25'; Avanesyan 36', 81', 90+1'; Kobyalko 86' | Stadium: Dzoraghbyur Training Centre; Attendance: 30; Referee: Edgar Sahakyan |

| 11 March 2020 Semifinal 1st leg | Ararat-Armenia | 1 – 0 | Gandzasar Kapan | Yerevan |
| 14:30 (UTC+4) | A.Khachumyan (yellow card) 19'; Louis 54'; Harutyunyan (yellow card) 69'; Čupić (yellow card) 90+3' | Report | D.Terteryan (yellow card) 43'; A.Adamyan (yellow card) 70' | Stadium: FFA Academy Stadium; Attendance: 300; Referee: Henrik Nalbandyan |

| 24 June 2020 Semifinal 2nd leg | Gandzasar Kapan | 0 – 2 (0 – 3 agg.) | Ararat-Armenia | Yerevan |
| 19:45 (UTC+4) | An.Kocharyan (yellow card) 64'; D.Terteryan (yellow card) 70' (red card) 70'; Harutyunyan (yellow card) 72'; A.Hovhannisyan (yellow card) 77' | Report | Ângelo 30'; Christian (yellow card) 51'; Abakumov (yellow card) 85'; Gouffran 90' | Stadium: FFA Academy Stadium; Attendance: 0 Referee: Zaven Hovhannisyan |
Note: Match to be played at the Yerevan Football Academy in Yerevan, instead of Gandzasar Kapan regular Gandzasar Stadium in Kapan. Match originally scheduled to be played on 22 March, but postponed on 13 March due to the COVID-19 pandemic.

==== Final ====
| 10 July 2020 | Noah | 5 – 5 (a.e.t.) (7 – 6 p) | Ararat-Armenia | Yerevan |
| 19:00 (UTC+4) | Mayrovich 39', 60'; Kryuchkov (yellow card) 49'; Azarov 56' (pen.), 115' (pen.); Spătaru 67'; Kovalenko (yellow card) 106'; V.Movsisyan (yellow card) 113' | Report | Louis 8', 40'; A.Tatayev 23' (o.g.); Otubanjo 29', 117'; Achenteh (yellow card) 55'; Kobyalko (yellow card) 89'; Kódjo (red card) 90+3'; Čupić (yellow card) 122' | Stadium: FFA Academy Stadium; Attendance: 0 Referee: Zaven Hovhannisyan |
| | Penalties |
| | K.Bor (penalty missed); Azarov (penalty scored); V.Avetisyan (penalty missed); Gareginyan (penalty scored); S.Dmitriev (penalty scored); Kovalenko (penalty scored); E.Grigoryan (penalty scored); Kryuchkov (penalty scored); R.Krusnauskas (penalty scored) | | (penalty missed) A.Nahapetyan; (penalty scored) Kobyalko; (penalty scored) Ângelo; (penalty missed) Malakyan; (penalty scored) Otubanjo; (penalty scored) Sanogo; (penalty scored) Christian; (penalty scored) Guz; (penalty missed) Danielyan |
Note: Match played behind closed doors due to the COVID-19 pandemic.

=== UEFA Champions League ===
==== Qualifying rounds ====
| 9 July 2019 First qualifying round 1st leg | Ararat-Armenia | 2 – 1 | (Sweden) AIK | Yerevan, Armenia |
| 18:00 (UTC+4) | Avetisyan 3' (pen.), 45'; Malakyan (yellow card) 28'; Antonov (yellow card) 89' | Report | Lundström (yellow card) 2' (yellow-red card) 13'; Obasi 39' | Stadium: Republican Stadium; Attendance: 1,497; Referee: Duje Strukan (Croatia) |

| 17 July 2019 First qualifying round 2nd leg | AIK (Sweden) | 3 – 1 (4 – 3 agg.) | Ararat-Armenia | Stockholm, Sweden |
| 21:00 (UTC+4) | Goitom 46', 52'; Larsson 62' (pen.); Adu (yellow card) 66' | Report | Kobyalko 77' | Stadium: Friends Arena; Attendance: 11,382; Referee: Robert Hennessy (Republic of Ireland) |

=== UEFA Europa League ===
==== Qualifying rounds ====
| 23 July 2019 Second qualifying round 1st leg | Ararat-Armenia | 2 – 0 | (Gibraltar) Lincoln Red Imps | Yerevan, Armenia |
| 19:00 (UTC+4) | Kobyalko 33'; Avetisyan (yellow card) 45+1'; Kódjo 45+2'; Ambartsumyan (yellow card) 72' | Report | J.Chipolina (yellow card) 27'; Borja Gil (yellow card) 45+1'; Marcos (red card) 49' | Stadium: Republican Stadium; Attendance: 1,500; Referee: Trustin Farrugia Cann (Malta) |
Note: Ararat-Armenia played their second qualifying round home matches at Republican Stadium, Yerevan, instead of their regular stadium FFA Academy Stadium, Yerevan which did not meet UEFA requirements.

| 30 July 2019 Second qualifying round 2nd leg | Lincoln Red Imps (Gibraltar) | 1 – 2 (1 – 4 agg.) | Ararat-Armenia | Gibraltar |
| 19:45 (UTC+4) | J.Toscano (yellow card) 40'; Hernandez 74'; J.Chipolina (yellow card) 78' | Report | Guz (yellow card) 18'; Louis 45+1', 58'; Pashov (yellow card) 52' | Stadium: Victoria Stadium; Attendance: 684; Referee: Alexandre Boucaut (Belgium) |

| 6 August 2019 Third qualifying round 1st leg | Ararat-Armenia | 1 – 2 | (Georgia (country)) Saburtalo Tbilisi | Yerevan, Armenia |
| 19:00 (UTC+4) | Kobyalko 31'; Achenteh (yellow card) 45+1'; Guz (yellow card) 85'; Antonov (yellow card) 90+5' | Report | G.Kokhreidze (yellow card) 1'; Diasamidze (yellow card) 15'; Gabedava (yellow card) 42'; Rekhviashvili (yellow card) 50'; S.Altunashvili 72'; Kenia 76'; Kakubava (yellow card) 82'; Migineishvili (yellow card) 90+4' | Stadium: Republican Stadium; Attendance: 10,500; Referee: Alain Bieri (Switzerland) |
Note: Ararat-Armenia played their third qualifying round home matches at Republican Stadium, Yerevan, instead of their regular stadium FFA Academy Stadium, Yerevan which did not meet UEFA requirements.

| 14 August 2019 Third qualifying round 2nd leg | Saburtalo Tbilisi (Georgia (country)) | 0 – 2 (2 – 3 agg.) | Ararat-Armenia | Tbilisi, Georgia |
| 20:00 (UTC+4) | S.Altunashvili (yellow card) 21'; A.Tera (yellow card) 32'; Gabedava (yellow card) 56'; Migineishvili (yellow card) 65'; N.Mali (yellow card) 86'; Gorgiashvili (yellow card) 90+1' | Report | Kobyalko 10' (yellow card) 37'; Guz (yellow card) 33'; Pashov (yellow card) 52'; Avetisyan 67' (pen.); Mailson (yellow card) 86' | Stadium: Mikheil Meskhi Stadium; Attendance: 14,904; Referee: Mykola Balakin (Ukraine) |

| 22 August 2019 Playoff round 1st leg | Ararat-Armenia | 2 – 1 | (Luxembourg) Dudelange | Yerevan, Armenia |
| 19:00 (UTC+4) | Mailson 22'; Kódjo (yellow card) 77'; Damčevski (yellow card) 84'; Antonov 90+3' | Report | Pokar (yellow card) 66'; Sinani 68'; Natami (yellow card) 74' | Stadium: Republican Stadium; Attendance: 11,000; Referee: Harald Lechner (Austria) |
Note: Ararat-Armenia played their third qualifying round home matches at Republican Stadium, Yerevan, instead of their regular stadium FFA Academy Stadium, Yerevan which did not meet UEFA requirements.

| 29 August 2019 Playoff round 2nd leg | Dudelange (Luxembourg) | 2 – 1 (a.e.t.) (3 – 3 agg.) (5 – 4 p) | Ararat-Armenia | Luxembourg City, Luxembourg |
| 22:00 (UTC+4) | Sinani 48' (pen.), 72' (yellow card) 67'; A.Bernier (yellow card) 81'; M.Kirch (yellow card) 111' | Report | Malakyan (yellow card) 11'; Kobyalko (penalty missed) 21'; Mailson 24'; Guz (yellow card) 36'; Ângelo (yellow card) 47'; Ambartsumyan (yellow card) 58'; Avetisyan (yellow card) 58'; Kódjo (yellow card) 61'; Sanogo (yellow card) 111' | Stadium: Stade Josy Barthel; Attendance: 2,874; Referee: Aleksandar Stavrev (North Macedonia) |
| | Penalties |
| | C.Lavie (penalty scored); C.Morren (penalty missed); S.Bougrine (penalty scored); O.Natami (penalty scored); Sinani (penalty scored); Schnell (penalty scored) | | Avetisyan (penalty missed); Kódjo (penalty scored); Mailson (penalty scored); Ângelo (penalty scored); Louis (penalty scored); Pashov (penalty missed) |
Note: F91 Dudelange played their home matches at Stade Josy Barthel, Luxembourg City, instead of their regular stadium Stade Jos Nosbaum, Dudelange.

== Statistics ==
As of match played 14 July 2020

=== Appearances and goals ===
| No. | Pos | Nat | Player | Total | | Premier League | | Armenian Cup | | Armenian Supercup | | Champions League | | Europa League | |
| No. | Pos | Nat | Player | Apps | Goals | Apps | Goals | Apps | Goals | Apps | Goals | Apps | Goals | Apps | Goals |
|---|---|---|---|---|---|---|---|---|---|---|---|---|---|---|---|
| 3 | DF | (Portugal) POR | Ângelo Meneses | 36 | 2 | 23+1 | 1 | 3 | 1 | 1 | 0 | 2 | 0 | 6 | 0 |
| 4 | DF | (Armenia) ARM | Albert Khachumyan | 13 | 0 | 7+3 | 0 | 2+1 | 0 | 0 | 0 | 0 | 0 | 0 | 0 |
| 7 | MF | (Armenia) ARM | Armen Nahapetyan | 12 | 1 | 1+7 | 0 | 1+2 | 0 | 1 | 1 | 0 | 0 | 0 | 0 |
| 8 | MF | (Armenia) ARM | Gor Malakyan | 28 | 0 | 15+4 | 0 | 1+1 | 0 | 0 | 0 | 1 | 0 | 4+2 | 0 |
| 9 | MF | (France) FRA | Yoan Gouffran | 15 | 1 | 7+6 | 0 | 0+2 | 1 | 0 | 0 | 0 | 0 | 0 | 0 |
| 10 | MF | (Russia) RUS | Armen Ambartsumyan | 27 | 3 | 11+5 | 3 | 4 | 0 | 1 | 0 | 0+2 | 0 | 3+1 | 0 |
| 11 | MF | (Armenia) ARM | Hovhannes Harutyunyan | 14 | 1 | 5+4 | 0 | 2+2 | 1 | 0+1 | 0 | 0 | 0 | 0 | 0 |
| 15 | DF | (Russia) RUS | Dmitry Guz | 31 | 3 | 15+6 | 3 | 1+1 | 0 | 1 | 0 | 2 | 0 | 5 | 0 |
| 17 | FW | (Burkina Faso) BFA | Zakaria Sanogo | 36 | 3 | 14+10 | 3 | 2+3 | 0 | 1 | 0 | 2 | 0 | 1+3 | 0 |
| 18 | FW | (Russia) RUS | Artyom Avanesyan | 7 | 5 | 5 | 0 | 2 | 5 | 0 | 0 | 0 | 0 | 0 | 0 |
| 20 | DF | (Morocco) MAR | Rochdi Achenteh | 25 | 0 | 13+1 | 0 | 2+1 | 0 | 0 | 0 | 1+1 | 0 | 6 | 0 |
| 21 | DF | (North Macedonia) MKD | Aleksandar Damčevski | 15 | 1 | 7+3 | 0 | 3 | 1 | 0 | 0 | 0 | 0 | 1+1 | 0 |
| 22 | DF | (Armenia) ARM | Artur Danielyan | 23 | 1 | 15+3 | 0 | 3 | 0 | 1 | 1 | 0 | 0 | 0+1 | 0 |
| 24 | FW | (Nigeria) NGR | Yusuf Otubanjo | 16 | 9 | 13 | 7 | 2+1 | 2 | 0 | 0 | 0 | 0 | 0 | 0 |
| 27 | MF | (Netherlands) NED | Furdjel Narsingh | 31 | 4 | 18+2 | 4 | 3 | 0 | 0 | 0 | 2 | 0 | 6 | 0 |
| 32 | FW | (Russia) RUS | Anton Kobyalko | 34 | 9 | 9+13 | 4 | 1+3 | 1 | 1 | 0 | 2 | 1 | 5 | 3 |
| 33 | GK | (Russia) RUS | Dmitry Abakumov | 29 | 0 | 22 | 0 | 2 | 0 | 0 | 0 | 2 | 0 | 3 | 0 |
| 44 | GK | (Serbia) SRB | Stefan Čupić | 13 | 0 | 6 | 0 | 3 | 0 | 1 | 0 | 0 | 0 | 3 | 0 |
| 63 | MF | (Ivory Coast) CIV | Kódjo | 33 | 2 | 22 | 1 | 2 | 0 | 0+1 | 0 | 2 | 0 | 6 | 1 |
| 67 | MF | (Estonia) EST | Ilja Antonov | 29 | 1 | 8+10 | 0 | 2+1 | 0 | 1 | 0 | 1+1 | 0 | 1+4 | 1 |
| 79 | MF | (Ukraine) UKR | Serhiy Vakulenko | 12 | 3 | 10 | 3 | 2 | 0 | 0 | 0 | 0 | 0 | 0 | 0 |
| 93 | DF | (Haiti) HAI | Alex Christian | 26 | 0 | 16+3 | 0 | 3+1 | 0 | 1 | 0 | 1 | 0 | 0+1 | 0 |
| 94 | MF | (Cape Verde) CPV | Mailson Lima | 37 | 11 | 20+6 | 8 | 3+1 | 0 | 0+1 | 1 | 0+1 | 0 | 5 | 2 |
| 99 | FW | (Nigeria) NGR | Ogana Louis | 31 | 13 | 9+11 | 3 | 4 | 8 | 0+1 | 0 | 0+1 | 0 | 1+4 | 2 |
Players away on loan:
Players who left Ararat-Armenia during the season:
| 6 | DF | (Bulgaria) BUL | Georgi Pashov | 16 | 0 | 7 | 0 | 1 | 0 | 0 | 0 | 2 | 0 | 6 | 0 |
| 77 | MF | (Armenia) ARM | Petros Avetisyan | 23 | 8 | 10+3 | 3 | 1 | 2 | 1 | 0 | 2 | 2 | 4+2 | 1 |

=== Goal scorers ===
| Place | Position | Nation | Number | Name | Premier League | Armenian Cup | Armenian Supercup | Champions League | Europa League | Total |
|---|---|---|---|---|---|---|---|---|---|---|
| 1 | FW | (Nigeria) | 99 | Ogana Louis | 3 | 8 | 0 | 0 | 2 | 13 |
| 2 | MF | (Cape Verde) | 94 | Mailson Lima | 8 | 0 | 1 | 0 | 2 | 11 |
| 3 | FW | (Nigeria) | 24 | Yusuf Otubanjo | 7 | 2 | 0 | 0 | 0 | 9 |
| 3 | FW | (Russia) | 32 | Anton Kobyalko | 4 | 1 | 0 | 1 | 3 | 9 |
| 5 | MF | (Armenia) | 77 | Petros Avetisyan | 3 | 2 | 0 | 2 | 1 | 8 |
| 6 | FW | (Russia) | 18 | Artyom Avanesyan | 0 | 5 | 0 | 0 | 0 | 5 |
| 7 | MF | (Netherlands) | 27 | Furdjel Narsingh | 4 | 0 | 0 | 0 | 0 | 4 |
| 7 | | | | Own goal | 2 | 2 | 0 | 0 | 0 | 4 |
| 9 | MF | (Ukraine) | 79 | Serhiy Vakulenko | 3 | 0 | 0 | 0 | 0 | 3 |
| 9 | DF | (Russia) | 15 | Dmitry Guz | 3 | 0 | 0 | 0 | 0 | 3 |
| 9 | MF | (Russia) | 10 | Armen Ambartsumyan | 3 | 0 | 0 | 0 | 0 | 3 |
| 9 | FW | (Burkina Faso) | 17 | Zakaria Sanogo | 3 | 0 | 0 | 0 | 0 | 3 |
| 13 | DF | (Portugal) | 3 | Ângelo Meneses | 1 | 1 | 0 | 0 | 0 | 2 |
| 13 | MF | (Ivory Coast) | 63 | Kódjo | 1 | 0 | 0 | 0 | 1 | 2 |
| 15 | MF | (Armenia) | 11 | Hovhannes Harutyunyan | 0 | 1 | 0 | 0 | 0 | 1 |
| 15 | DF | (North Macedonia) | 21 | Aleksandar Damčevski | 0 | 1 | 0 | 0 | 0 | 1 |
| 15 | MF | (France) | 9 | Yoan Gouffran | 0 | 1 | 0 | 0 | 0 | 1 |
| 15 | MF | (Armenia) | 7 | Armen Nahapetyan | 0 | 0 | 1 | 0 | 0 | 1 |
| 15 | DF | (Armenia) | 22 | Artur Danielyan | 0 | 0 | 1 | 0 | 0 | 1 |
| 15 | MF | (Estonia) | 67 | Ilja Antonov | 0 | 0 | 0 | 0 | 1 | 1 |
| | | | | TOTALS | 45 | 24 | 3 | 3 | 10 | 85 |

=== Clean sheets ===
| Place | Position | Nation | Number | Name | Premier League | Armenian Cup | Armenian Supercup | Champions League | Europa League | Total |
|---|---|---|---|---|---|---|---|---|---|---|
| 1 | GK | (Russia) | 33 | Dmitry Abakumov | 10 | 2 | 0 | 0 | 1 | 13 |
| 2 | GK | (Serbia) | 44 | Stefan Čupić | 1 | 1 | 0 | 0 | 1 | 3 |
| | | | | TOTALS | 11 | 3 | 0 | 0 | 2 | 16 |

=== Disciplinary record ===
| Number | Nation | Position | Name | Premier League | | Armenian Cup | | Armenian Supercup | | Champions League | | Europa League | | Total | |
| Number | Nation | Position | Name | Yellow card | Red card | Yellow card | Red card | Yellow card | Red card | Yellow card | Red card | Yellow card | Red card | Yellow card | Red card |
| 3 | (Portugal) | DF | Ângelo Meneses | 4 | 0 | 0 | 0 | 0 | 0 | 0 | 0 | 1 | 0 | 5 | 0 |
| 4 | (Armenia) | DF | Albert Khachumyan | 3 | 0 | 1 | 0 | 0 | 0 | 0 | 0 | 0 | 0 | 4 | 0 |
| 8 | (Armenia) | MF | Gor Malakyan | 7 | 0 | 0 | 0 | 0 | 0 | 1 | 0 | 1 | 0 | 9 | 0 |
| 9 | (France) | MF | Yoan Gouffran | 3 | 0 | 0 | 0 | 0 | 0 | 0 | 0 | 0 | 0 | 3 | 0 |
| 10 | (Russia) | MF | Armen Ambartsumyan | 4 | 0 | 1 | 0 | 0 | 0 | 0 | 0 | 2 | 0 | 7 | 0 |
| 11 | (Armenia) | MF | Hovhannes Harutyunyan | 1 | 0 | 1 | 0 | 0 | 0 | 0 | 0 | 0 | 0 | 2 | 0 |
| 15 | (Russia) | DF | Dmitry Guz | 4 | 1 | 0 | 0 | 0 | 0 | 0 | 0 | 4 | 0 | 8 | 1 |
| 17 | (Burkina Faso) | FW | Zakaria Sanogo | 3 | 0 | 0 | 0 | 1 | 0 | 0 | 0 | 1 | 0 | 5 | 0 |
| 20 | (Morocco) | DF | Rochdi Achenteh | 2 | 0 | 1 | 0 | 0 | 0 | 0 | 0 | 1 | 0 | 4 | 0 |
| 21 | (North Macedonia) | DF | Aleksandar Damčevski | 3 | 1 | 0 | 0 | 0 | 0 | 0 | 0 | 1 | 0 | 4 | 1 |
| 22 | (Armenia) | DF | Artur Danielyan | 4 | 0 | 0 | 0 | 0 | 0 | 0 | 0 | 0 | 0 | 4 | 0 |
| 24 | (Nigeria) | FW | Yusuf Otubanjo | 1 | 0 | 0 | 0 | 0 | 0 | 0 | 0 | 0 | 0 | 1 | 0 |
| 32 | (Russia) | FW | Anton Kobyalko | 2 | 0 | 1 | 0 | 0 | 0 | 0 | 0 | 1 | 0 | 4 | 0 |
| 33 | (Russia) | GK | Dmitry Abakumov | 2 | 0 | 1 | 0 | 0 | 0 | 0 | 0 | 0 | 0 | 3 | 0 |
| 44 | (Serbia) | GK | Stefan Čupić | 0 | 0 | 2 | 0 | 0 | 0 | 0 | 0 | 0 | 0 | 2 | 0 |
| 63 | (Ivory Coast) | MF | Kódjo | 8 | 1 | 0 | 1 | 0 | 0 | 0 | 0 | 2 | 0 | 10 | 2 |
| 67 | (Estonia) | MF | Ilja Antonov | 4 | 1 | 0 | 0 | 0 | 0 | 1 | 0 | 1 | 0 | 6 | 1 |
| 79 | (Ukraine) | MF | Serhiy Vakulenko | 1 | 0 | 0 | 0 | 0 | 0 | 0 | 0 | 0 | 0 | 1 | 0 |
| 93 | (Haiti) | DF | Alex Christian | 2 | 0 | 1 | 0 | 0 | 0 | 0 | 0 | 1 | 0 | 4 | 0 |
| 94 | (Cape Verde) | MF | Mailson Lima | 4 | 0 | 0 | 0 | 0 | 0 | 0 | 0 | 0 | 0 | 4 | 0 |
Players who left Ararat-Armenia during the season:
| 6 | (Bulgaria) | DF | Georgi Pashov | 3 | 0 | 0 | 0 | 0 | 0 | 0 | 0 | 2 | 0 | 5 | 0 |
| 77 | (Armenia) | MF | Petros Avetisyan | 2 | 0 | 0 | 0 | 0 | 0 | 0 | 0 | 2 | 0 | 4 | 0 |
| | | | TOTALS | 67 | 4 | 9 | 1 | 1 | 0 | 2 | 0 | 20 | 0 | 99 | 5 |
