= 2019 Armenian Supercup =

Ararat-Armenia	Alashkert
3	2
- Date: 24 September 2019
- Venue: Republican Stadium, Yerevan
- Referee: Gevorg Eghoyan
- Attendance: 1,000

The 2019 Armenian Supercup was the 22nd Armenian Supercup, an annual football match played between the winners of the previous season's Premier League, Ararat-Armenia, and the previous season's Armenian Cup, Alashkert, with the former winning 3–2 after extra time.

== Background ==
Ararat-Armenia won their first League title since their formation prior to the 2017–18 season.

Alashkert won their first Armenian Cup title after beating Lori 1–0 in the final.

== Match details ==
24 September 2019
19:00 (UTC+4)

Ararat-Armenia	3 – 2 (a.e.t.)	Alashkert
A.Nahapetyan 27'; Danielyan 90'; Lima 110'	Report	Marmentini 24'; M.Manasyan 65'

Republican Stadium, Yerevan
Attendance: 1,000
Referee: Gevorg Eghoyan

Ararat-Armenia	Alashkert

GK	44	(Serbia) Stefan Čupić
DF	3	(Portugal) Ângelo Meneses
DF	15	(Russia) Dmitry Guz
DF	22	(Armenia) Artur Danielyan
DF	93	(Haiti) Alex Christian
MF	7	(Armenia) Armen Nahapetyan	(substituted off) 60'
MF	10	(Russia) Armen Ambartsumyan	(substituted off) 72'
MF	67	(Estonia) Ilja Antonov
MF	77	(Armenia) Petros Avetisyan	(substituted off) 72'
FW	17	(Burkina Faso) Zakaria Sanogo
FW	32	(Russia) Anton Kobyalko	(substituted off) 97'
Substitutes:
GK	33	(Russia) Dmitry Abakumov
DF	4	(Armenia) Albert Khachumyan
MF	8	(Armenia) Gor Malakyan
MF	11	(Armenia) Hovhannes Harutyunyan	(substituted in) 97'
FW	18	(Russia) Artyom Avanesyan
FW	19	(Armenia) Narek Alaverdyan
DF	20	(Morocco) Rochdi Achenteh
DF	21	(North Macedonia) Aleksandar Damchevski
MF	63	(Ivory Coast) Kódjo	(substituted in) 72'
MF	94	(Cape Verde) Mailson Lima	(substituted in) 60'
FW	99	(Nigeria) Ogana Louis	(substituted in) 72'
Manager:
(Armenia) Vardan Minasyan

GK	1	(Armenia) Henri Avagyan
DF	3	(Armenia) Taron Voskanyan
DF	8	(Armenia) Gagik Daghbashyan
DF	18	(Brazil) Tiago Cametá
DF	22	(Armenia) Hayk Ishkhanyan
MF	6	(Armenia) Artur Yedigaryan	(substituted off) 64'
MF	10	(Brazil) Gustavo Marmentini
MF	11	(Armenia) Vahagn Hayrapetyan	(substituted off) 84'
MF	14	(Armenia) Sargis Shahinyan
FW	7	(Armenia) Mihran Manasyan	(substituted off) 75'
FW	15	(Bosnia and Herzegovina) Aleksandar Glišić	(substituted off) 108'
Substitutes:
GK	31	(Armenia) Gor Manukyan
DF	5	(Estonia) Nikita Baranov	(substituted in) 84'
FW	9	(Brazil) Thiago Galvão	(substituted in) 75'
FW	12	(Armenia) David Ghandilyan	(substituted in) 108'
MF	13	(Ukraine) Artur Avahimyan
MF	17	(Armenia) Ghukas Poghosyan
MF	21	(Armenia) Artak Grigoryan	(substituted in) 64'
MF	24	(Armenia) Eduard Avagyan
DF	25	(Armenia) Gor Poghosyan
FW	77	(Armenia) Gegham Kadimyan
Manager:
(Armenia) Armen Adamyan

Assistant referees:
Atom Sevgulyan
Harutyun Hambardzumyan
Fourth official:
Ruzanna Petrosyan

== See also ==
- 2018–19 Armenian Premier League
- 2018–19 Armenian Cup
