= Marcos Pérez =

Marcos Pérez may refer to:

- Marcos Pérez Jiménez (1914–2001), Venezuelan politician
- Marcos Pérez Esquer (born 1970), Mexican politician
- Marcos Pérez (footballer, born 1989), Spanish footballer
- Marcos Pérez (footballer, born 1993), Argentine footballer

== See also ==
- Marco Pérez (disambiguation)
- Markus Perez (born 1990), Brazilian mixed martial artist
- Marcos Peres, Brazilian writer
