= Furdjel Narsingh =

Dutch footballer

Personal information
- Full name: Furdjel Robby Narsingh
- Date of birth: 13 March 1988 (age 38)
- Place of birth: Amsterdam, Netherlands
- Height: 1.75 m (5 ft 9 in)
- Position: Winger

Youth career
- Fortius
- Zeeburgia
- Ajax
- AZ

Senior career*
| Years | Team | Apps | (Gls) |
| 2006–2011 | AZ | 0 | (0) |
| 2008–2009 | → Volendam (loan) | 12 | (0) |
| 2009–2011 | → Telstar (loan) | 42 | (4) |
| 2011–2014 | PEC Zwolle | 41 | (7) |
| 2014–2016 | SC Cambuur | 49 | (1) |
| 2017–2018 | SC Cambuur | 8 | (1) |
| 2018–2019 | De Graafschap | 28 | (3) |
| 2019–2022 | Ararat-Armenia | 66 | (5) |

International career
| 2006 | Netherlands U19 | 1 | (0) |
- * Club domestic league appearances and goals as of 18:06, 12 March 2023 (UTC)

Furdjel Robby Narsingh (born 13 March 1988) is a Dutch professional footballer who plays as a winger. He formerly played for AZ, Volendam, Telstar, PEC Zwolle, SC Cambuur, De Graafschap and Ararat-Armenia.

== Career ==
Born in Amsterdam, Narsingh began his career with Zeeburgia and later joined Jong Ajax. In summer 2006 he signed with AZ Alkmaar and was loaned out in July 2008 to FC Volendam till 30 June 2009.

On 19 June 2009, the 21-year-old striker joined Telstar for the 2009–10 season on loan from AZ Alkmaar.

On 6 July 2011 Furdjel Narsingh joined FC Zwolle. He promoted to the Eredivisie in 2013.

On 28 May 2014, Narsingh signed a one-year deal with SC Cambuur, with an option for another season.

In July 2017, he joined League One side Oxford United on trial. However, he was originally confused for his brother Luciano on the team sheet and the club's social media.

In October 2017, after one year without a team he rejoined SC Cambuur.

== Personal life ==
Narsingh is of Indian-Surinamese and Afro-Surinamese descent and has a brother named Luciano, who plays for Sydney FC.

== Career statistics ==
=== Club ===
As of match played 14 May 2022

Appearances and goals by club, season and competition
| Club | Season | League | | | National Cup | | Continental | | Other | | Total | |
| Club | Season | Division | Apps | Goals | Apps | Goals | Apps | Goals | Apps | Goals | Apps | Goals |
|---|---|---|---|---|---|---|---|---|---|---|---|---|
| Volendam (loan) | 2008–09 | Eredivisie | 12 | 0 | 0 | 0 | — | | — | | 12 | 0 |
| Telstar (loan) | 2009–10 | Eerste Divisie | 30 | 3 | 0 | 0 | — | | — | | 30 | 3 |
| Telstar (loan) | 2010–11 | Eerste Divisie | 12 | 1 | 1 | 0 | — | | — | | 13 | 1 |
| Telstar (loan) | Total | | 42 | 4 | 1 | 0 | - | - | - | - | 43 | 4 |
| PEC Zwolle | 2011–12 | Eerste Divisie | 17 | 5 | 1 | 0 | — | | — | | 18 | 5 |
| PEC Zwolle | 2012–13 | Eredivisie | 13 | 0 | 3 | 0 | — | | — | | 16 | 0 |
| PEC Zwolle | 2013–14 | Eredivisie | 11 | 2 | 3 | 0 | — | | — | | 14 | 2 |
| PEC Zwolle | Total | | 41 | 7 | 7 | 0 | - | - | - | - | 48 | 7 |
| Cambuur | 2014–15 | Eredivisie | 23 | 0 | 4 | 2 | — | | — | | 27 | 2 |
| Cambuur | 2015–16 | Eredivisie | 26 | 1 | 0 | 0 | — | | — | | 26 | 1 |
| Cambuur | Total | | 49 | 1 | 4 | 2 | - | - | - | - | 53 | 3 |
| Cambuur | 2017–18 | Eerste Divisie | 8 | 1 | 2 | 0 | — | | 1 (Note: Appearances and goals in the Eredivisie Promotion/relegation play-offs) | 0 | 11 | 1 |
| De Graafschap | 2018–19 | Eredivisie | 28 | 3 | 1 | 0 | — | | 4 | 1 | 33 | 4 |
| Ararat-Armenia | 2019–20 | Armenian Premier League | 20 | 4 | 3 | 0 | 8 (Note: Two appearances in the UEFA Champions League, six appearances in the UEFA Europa League) | 0 | 0 (Note: Appearances in the Armenian Supercup) | 0 | 31 | 4 |
| Ararat-Armenia | 2020–21 | Armenian Premier League | 20 | 0 | 4 | 0 | 4 (Note: One appearance in the UEFA Champions League, three appearances in the UEFA Europa League) | 0 | 0 | 0 | 28 | 0 |
| Ararat-Armenia | 2021–22 | Armenian Premier League | 26 | 1 | 0 | 0 | - | | - | | 26 | 1 |
| Ararat-Armenia | Total | | 66 | 5 | 7 | 0 | 12 | 0 | 0 | 0 | 85 | 5 |
| Career total | | | 246 | 21 | 22 | 2 | 12 | 0 | 5 | 1 | 287 | 24 |

== Honours ==
=== Club ===
PEC Zwolle

- KNVB Cup (1): 2013–14
- Eerste Divisie (1): 2011–12

Ararat-Armenia

- Armenian Premier League (1): 2019–20
- Armenian Supercup (1): 2019
