= Yaroslav Deda =

Ukrainian footballer

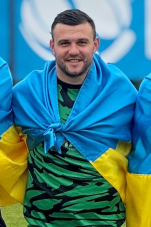
- Deda playing for Hirnyk Novoiavorivsk in 2025

Personal information
- Full name: Yaroslav Myroslavovych Deda
- Date of birth: 28 May 1999 (age 27)
- Place of birth: Ivano-Frankove, Lviv Oblast, Ukraine
- Height: 1.73 m (5 ft 8 in)
- Position: Forward

Youth career
- 2012–2014: BRW-BIK Volodymyr-Volynskyi
- 2014–2015: Volyn Lutsk

Senior career*
Years	Team	Apps	(Gls)
2015–2017	Volyn Lutsk	14	(0)
2017–2018	Qarabağ	0	(0)
2019–2020	Karpaty Lviv	8	(1)
2020–2021	Karpaty Halych	13	(5)

International career^{‡}
2014–2015	Ukraine-16	9	(2)
2015–2016	Ukraine-17	7	(2)
2016–2017	Ukraine-18	3	(0)
- * Club domestic league appearances and goals as of 8 October 2021 ‡ National team caps and goals as of 8 October 2021

Yaroslav Deda (Ukrainian: Ярослав Мирославович Деда; born 28 May 1999) is a professional Ukrainian football striker who played for Karpaty Halych.

== Career ==
Deda is a product of the two different Sportive youth schools in Volyn Oblast. He made his debut in the Ukrainian Premier League for club FC Volyn Lutsk in a match against FC Stal Dniprodzerzhynsk as main-squad player on 13 March 2016.

He is also a member of the different Ukrainian youth representations.

His twin brother Myroslav is also a professional footballer.
