= Myroslav Deda =

Ukrainian footballer

Personal information
- Full name: Myroslav Myroslavovych Deda
- Date of birth: 28 May 1999 (age 27)
- Place of birth: Ivano-Frankove, Lviv Oblast, Ukraine
- Height: 1.73 m (5 ft 8 in)
- Position: Midfielder

Youth career
- 2012–2014: BRW-WIK Volodymyr-Volynskyi
- 2014–2016: FC Volyn Lutsk

Senior career*
Years	Team	Apps	(Gls)
2016–	Volyn Lutsk	0	(0)
- * Club domestic league appearances and goals as of 26 November 2016

Myroslav Myroslavovych Deda (Ukrainian: Мирослав Мирославович Деда; born 28 May 1999) is a professional Ukrainian football midfielder who plays for FC Volyn Lutsk in the Ukrainian Premier League.

== Career ==
Deda is a product of the BRW-VIK and Volyn Youth Sportive School Systems. Then he signed a professional contract with FC Volyn Lutsk in the Ukrainian Premier League.

He made his debut in the Ukrainian Premier League for FC Volyn on 26 November 2016, playing in the match against FC Dynamo Kyiv.

His twin brother Yaroslav is also a professional footballer.
