= Marco Pérez =

Marco Pérez may refer to:

- Marco Angel Pérez (born 1977), Mexican boxer
- Marco Pérez (actor) (born 1977), Mexican actor
- Marco Pérez (Liechtenstein footballer) (born 1978), Liechtenstein footballer for Wiener Sport-Club
- Marco Iván Pérez (born 1987), Mexican footballer for C.F. Pachuca
- Marco Pérez (Colombian footballer) (born 1990), Colombian footballer for Independiente Medellín
- Marco Pérez (Marko), Venezuelan singer, former member of Calle Ciega
