= Hovhannes Harutyunyan =

Armenian footballer

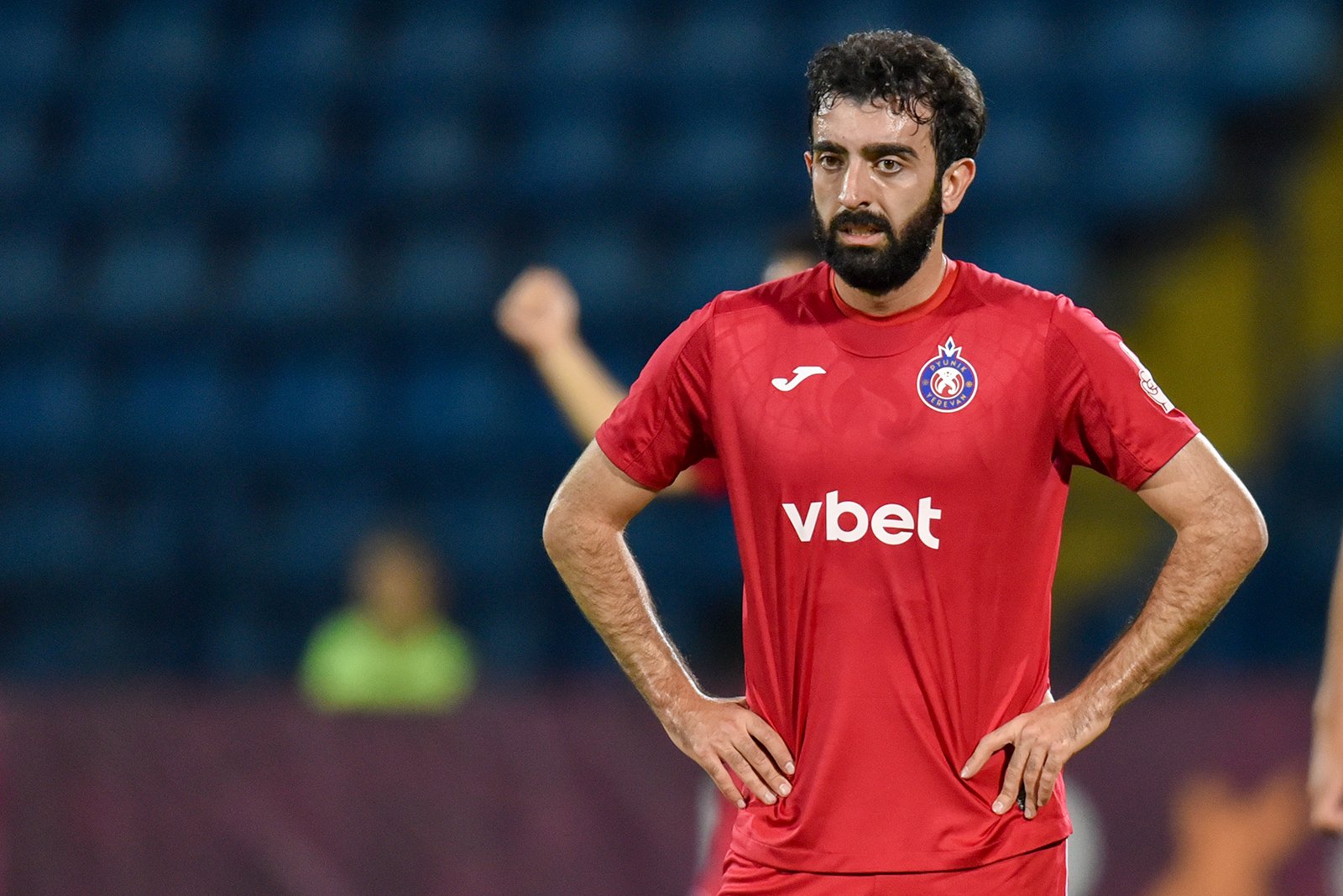
- Harutyunyan with Pyunik in 2022

Personal information
- Full name: Hovhannes Sargisovich Harutyunyan
- Date of birth: 25 May 1999 (age 27)
- Place of birth: Yerevan, Armenia
- Height: 1.75 m (5 ft 9 in)
- Position: Central midfielder

Team information
- Current team: Pyunik
- Number: 11

Youth career
- –2015: Mika
- 2015–2016: Pyunik

Senior career*
| Years | Team | Apps | (Gls) |
| 2016–2017 | Pyunik | 23 | (2) |
| 2017–2018 | Ararat-Armenia | 11 | (5) |
| 2018–2019 | Zemplín Michalovce | 7 | (0) |
| 2019–2021 | Ararat-Armenia | 12 | (0) |
| 2021–2023 | Pyunik | 88 | (20) |
| 2024–2025 | Sochi | 0 | (0) |
| 2024 | → Pyunik (loan) | 12 | (2) |
| 2024–2025 | → Ararat-Armenia (loan) | 23 | (2) |
| 2025–2026 | Noah | 15 | (0) |
| 2026– | Pyunik | | |

International career^{‡}
| 2014–2015 | Armenia U17 | 15 | (2) |
| 2016–2017 | Armenia U19 | 32 | (3) |
| 2017–2020 | Armenia U21 | 9 | (1) |
| 2022– | Armenia | 17 | (0) |
- * Club domestic league appearances and goals as of 11 December 2025 ‡ National team caps and goals as of 12 November 2026

Hovhannes Harutyunyan (Armenian: Հովհաննես Հարությունյան; born 25 May 1999) is an Armenian professional footballer who plays as a central midfielder for Pyunik and the Armenia national team.

== Career ==
=== Club ===
On 1 March 2018, Zemplín Michalovce announced the signing of Harutyunyan to a two-year contract. Harutyunyan made his professional debut for Zemplín Michalovce against Senica on 28 April 2018.

On 28 January 2021, Harutyunyan was released by Ararat-Armenia, with Pyunik announcing his signing on 4 February 2021. On 3 February 2023, Harutyunyan extended his contract with Pyunik, until the summer of 2024.

On 17 January 2024, Harutyunyan signed with Russian Premier League club Sochi. On 27 February 2024, he was loaned back to Pyunik.

On 30 June 2024, Harutyunyan joined Ararat-Armenia on loan for the 2024–25 season. On 12 June 2025, Sochi announced the return of Harutyunyan to the club from loan.

On 3 July 2025, Noah announced the permanent signing of Harutyunyan from Sochi, to a two-year contract.

== International career ==
On 9 March 2022, Harutyunyan was called up to the senior Armenia national football team for his first time, for their friendlies games against Montenegro and Norway on 24 and 29 March 2022.

He made his international debut for the senior Armenia on 24 March 2022 in a friendly match against Montenegro.

== Career statistics ==
=== Club ===
As of match played 9 December 2022

Appearances and goals by club, season and competition
| Club | Season | League | | | National cup (Note: Includes Armenian Cup and Slovak Cup) | | Continental | | Other | | Total | |
| Club | Season | Division | Apps | Goals | Apps | Goals | Apps | Goals | Apps | Goals | Apps | Goals |
|---|---|---|---|---|---|---|---|---|---|---|---|---|
| Pyunik | 2015–16 | Armenian Premier League | 3 | 0 | 0 | 0 | 0 (Note: Appearances in the UEFA Champions League) | 0 | 0 (Note: Appearances in the Armenian Supercup) | 0 | 3 | 0 |
| Pyunik | 2016–17 | Armenian Premier League | 20 | 2 | 4 | 0 | 2 (Note: Appearances in the UEFA Europa League) | 0 | — | | 26 | 2 |
| Pyunik | 2017–18 | Armenian Premier League | 0 | 0 | 0 | 0 | 2 | 0 | — | | 2 | 0 |
| Pyunik | Total | | 23 | 2 | 4 | 0 | 4 | 0 | 0 | 0 | 31 | 2 |
| Ararat-Armenia | 2017–18 | Armenian First League | 11 | 5 | 1 | 0 | — | | — | | 12 | 5 |
| Zemplín Michalovce | 2017–18 | Slovak Super Liga | 2 | 0 | 0 | 0 | — | | — | | 2 | 0 |
| Zemplín Michalovce | 2018–19 | Slovak Super Liga | 5 | 0 | 0 | 0 | — | | — | | 5 | 0 |
| Zemplín Michalovce | Total | | 7 | 0 | 0 | - | - | - | - | - | 7 | 0 |
| Ararat-Armenia | 2019–20 | Armenian Premier League | 9 | 0 | 4 | 1 | 0 (Note: Appearances in the UEFA Champions League and UEFA Europa League) | 0 | 1 | 0 | 14 | 1 |
| Ararat-Armenia | 2020–21 | Armenian Premier League | 3 | 0 | 0 | 0 | 0 (Note: Appearances in the UEFA Champions League and UEFA Europa League) | 0 | 1 | 0 | 4 | 0 |
| Ararat-Armenia | Total | | 12 | 0 | 4 | 1 | 0 | 0 | 2 | 0 | 18 | 1 |
| Pyunik | 2020–21 | Armenian Premier League | 11 | 1 | 1 | 0 | — | | | | 12 | 1 |
| Pyunik | 2021–22 | Armenian Premier League | 31 | 4 | 2 | 0 | — | | | | 35 | 4 |
| Pyunik | 2022–23 | Armenian Premier League | 14 | 3 | 0 | 0 | 14 (Note: Six appearances in the UEFA Champions League, two appearances in the UEFA Europa League, and six appearances in the UEFA Europa Conference League) | 0 | — | | 28 | 3 |
| Pyunik | Total | | 57 | 8 | 3 | 0 | 14 | 0 | - | - | 74 | 8 |
| Career total | | | 100 | 15 | 12 | 1 | 18 | 0 | 2 | 0 | 142 | 16 |

=== International ===
As of match played 12 November 2026

| National Team | Year | Apps | Goals |
|---|---|---|---|
Armenia
| Armenia | 2022 | 6 | 0 |
| Armenia | 2023 | 3 | 0 |
| Armenia | 2024 | 6 | 0 |
| Armenia | 2025 | 1 | 0 |
| Armenia | 2026 | 1 | 0 |
| Total | | 17 | 0 |

== Honours ==
Ararat-Armenia

- Armenian Premier League (1): 2019–20
- Armenian Supercup (1): 2019, 2024

Pyunik

- Armenian Premier League (1): 2021–22, 2023–24

Noah

- Armenian Cup: 2025–26
- Armenian Supercup: 2025

Individual

- Armenian Premier League Goal of the Season: 2023–24
