= Anton Kupchin =

Russian footballer

Personal information
- Full name: Anton Igorevich Kupchin
- Date of birth: 3 April 1990 (age 36)
- Place of birth: Khabarovsk, Russian SFSR
- Height: 1.77 m (5 ft 9 1/2 in)
- Position: Left back

Youth career
- SKA-Khabarovsk

Senior career*
Years	Team	Apps	(Gls)
2008–2009	SKA-Khabarovsk	9	(1)
2010	Lokomotiv-2 Moscow	22	(0)
2011–2017	SKA-Khabarovsk	68	(0)
2012	→ Sakhalin (loan)	13	(0)
2019	TSK Simferopol		
2019	West Armenia	4	(0)
2019	Kafa Feodosia	5	(0)
2020	Masis	2	(0)
2021	TSK Simferopol		
- * Club domestic league appearances and goals

Anton Igorevich Kupchin (Russian: Антон Игоревич Купчин; born 3 April 1990) is a Russian former professional football player.

== Club career ==
He made his Russian Football National League debut for FC SKA-Energiya Khabarovsk on 24 June 2008 in a game against FC KAMAZ Naberezhnye Chelny. He played 7 seasons in the FNL for SKA.

In September 2019, Kupchin joined FC Favorit-VD Kafa which he played five league games for before leaving.
