= Yoan Gouffran =

French footballer (born 1986)

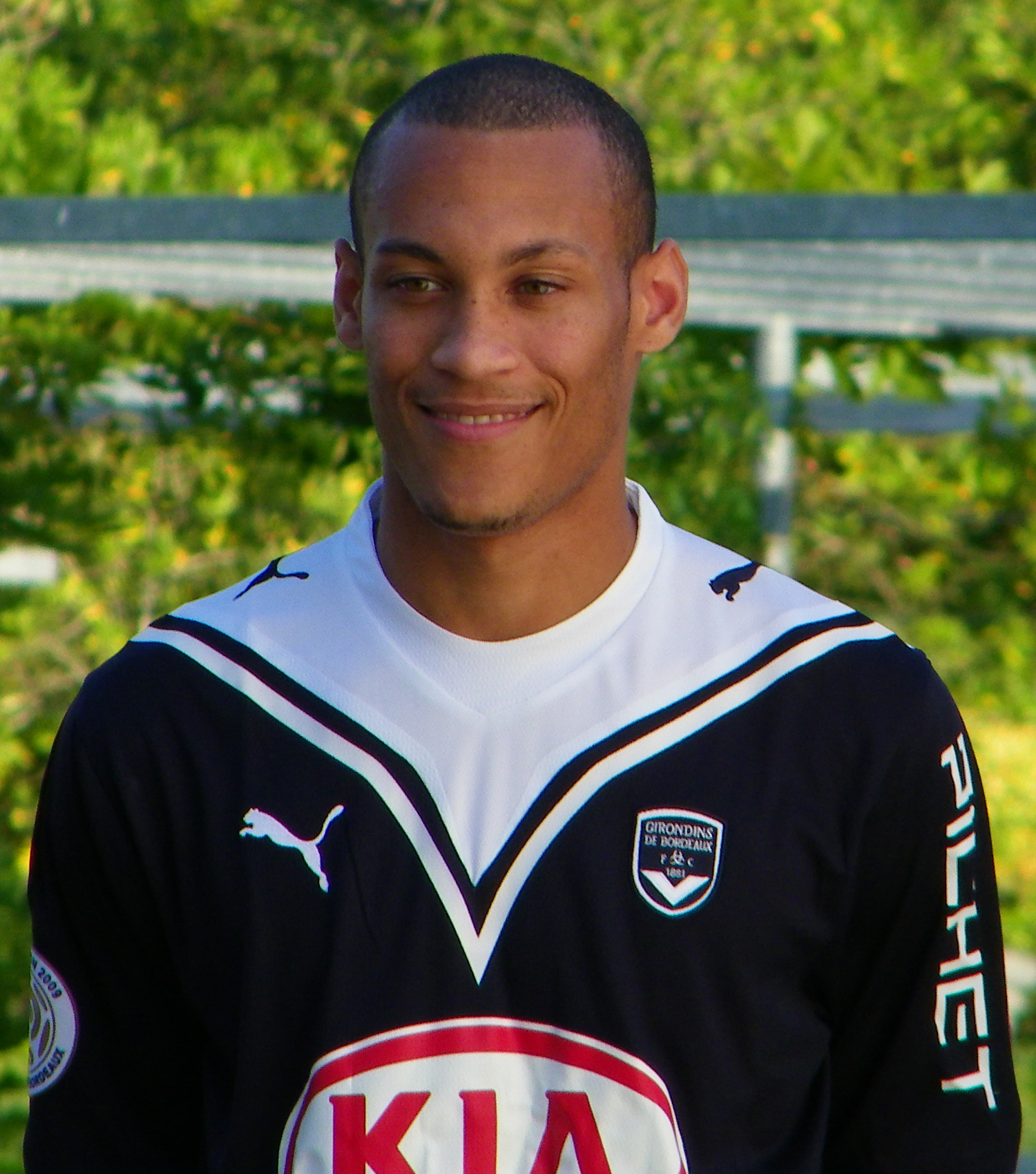
- Gouffran playing for Bordeaux in 2008

Personal information
- Full name: Yoan Patrick Gouffran
- Date of birth: 25 May 1986 (age 40)
- Place of birth: Villeneuve-Saint-Georges, Val-de-Marne, France
- Height: 1.76 m (5 ft 9 in)
- Positions: Striker; winger

Youth career
- 1993–2001: Red Star Paris
- 2001–2003: Caen

Senior career*
Years	Team	Apps	(Gls)
2003–2008	Caen	115	(33)
2008–2013	Bordeaux	139	(31)
2013–2017	Newcastle United	119	(16)
2017–2019	Göztepe	46	(2)
2020–2021	Ararat-Armenia	40	(0)
Total		459	(82)

International career
2006–2008	France U21	24	(4)
- * Club domestic league appearances and goals

Yoan Patrick Gouffran (born 25 May 1986) is a French former professional footballer who played as a striker or a winger. He was renowned for his pace and ability to finish with either foot.

== Club career ==
Gouffran was born in Villeneuve-Saint-Georges, Val-de-Marne, to a Guadeloupean father, and French Guianan mother.

On 20 May 2007, he was awarded Ligue 2 Player of the Season after a successful season with Caen which saw the club promoted to the Ligue 1.

=== Bordeaux ===
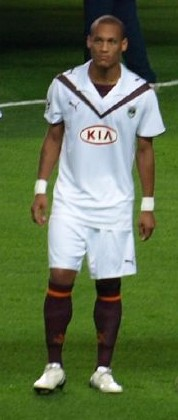
Gouffran playing for Bordeaux

After achieving success with Caen during the 2007–08 Ligue 1 season, it was suspected Gouffran would make a move elsewhere. After consistent rumours linking him primarily with English Premier League club Arsenal, including rumors of him signing a pre-contract agreement with the club, Gouffran opted to stay in Ligue 1, signing a four-year contract with Bordeaux. The transfer fee was priced at €6.5 million and he officially joined the club on 30 June 2008. After starting the league season off with no league goals after 26 matches, he finally scored his first league goal for Bordeaux on 29 April 2009 in a key match against Rennes, which Bordeaux won 3–2. On the final matchday of the season, 30 May, he scored the winning goal that secured Bordeaux the championship, against his former club Caen who were relegated to Ligue 2. He also scored one of the goals as Bordeaux won the 2009 Coupe de la Ligue Final against Vannes OC.

Gouffran denied league leaders Paris Saint-Germain's attempt at winning seven straight Ligue 1 games, when he scored the equalizer in a 1–1 home draw on 6 November 2011. The result meant that Bordeaux had drawn six of their first seven league games.

Gouffran finished with Bordeaux half way through the 2012–13 season with 8 goals in 20 games.

=== Newcastle United ===
With only six months left on his contract, English Premier League club Newcastle United had a cut price £500,000 bid accepted for Gouffran. On 22 January 2013, Gouffran revealed via Twitter that a move to Newcastle was due to happen the following day: "Tomorrow I will be a new player of Newcastle and I am proud. Thanks to everyone." He added, "Big thanks to everyone who has supported me through the good times and bad times. I thank the leadership of the club and the staff for helping me grow I need a new challenge and therefore I hope that you respect my choice. I will follow all the results of the Girondins (Bordeaux)." He was unveiled as a Newcastle player on 23 January, after signing a four-and-a-half-year contract and given the number 11 shirt. He made his debut for Newcastle on 29 January 2013 in a 1–2 win against Aston Villa at Villa Park. He scored his first Newcastle goal on 9 February in a 2–1 defeat against Tottenham Hotspur. On 2 November, Gouffran scored the first goal for Newcastle in their 2–0 win against Chelsea. After the match, he received rave reviews from manager Alan Pardew. Gouffran continued an impressive run of form, scoring again against Norwich City and then added another goal to take his tally to five for the season when he scored the first of Newcastle's two goals against West Bromwich Albion on 30 November 2013. Gouffran followed this up by scoring Newcastle's only goal in a one-all draw at home to Southampton on 14 December. Following his impressive form, he suddenly became a fan favourite, mainly due to his hard working mentality which was a key factor in Newcastle's sudden rise toward the top of the Premier League standings. On 26 December 2013, Gouffran scored yet again in a comprehensive 5–1 victory over Stoke City at St James' Park, in doing so becoming the first player for Newcastle to score in five consecutive games at St. James' Park since Alan Shearer in 1997.

The following season, Gouffran came under criticism from many fans as Newcastle avoided relegation on the final day of the season.

Under new boss Steve McClaren, Gouffran featured less and was often played out of position in central midfield. He only made eight appearances as Newcastle were relegated.

Despite being linked with a move back to France and having his squad number changed to 20 to make way for new signing Matt Ritchie, Gouffran became a regular in the Championship under manager Rafael Benítez. He made 39 appearances, scoring 5 goals.

=== Goztepe ===
Despite being offered a new contract by Newcastle, Gouffran opted to join Süper Lig side Göztepe on a free transfer on 17 July 2017 as his Newcastle contract expired. He played 76 minutes on his debut in a 2–2 draw against Fenerbahçe on 12 August 2017. Gouffran scored his first goal for Goztepe in a 3–3 draw against Osmanlıspor on 10 February 2018.

=== Ararat-Armenia ===
On 1 February 2020, Armenian Premier League club Ararat-Armenia announced the signing of Gouffran. He made 13 league appearances during the 2019–20 season as Ararat-Armenia went on to win their second league title in a row on 14 July 2020.

On 12 October 2021, Gouffran announced his retirement from football.

== International career ==
Gouffran was a France under-21 international. He took part in the 2006 U-21 Championships in Portugal, where he made four appearances and scored one goal. He made 22 appearances for the U-21s, scoring three goals.

== Career statistics ==
Appearances and goals by club, season and competition
Club	Season	League			National cup		League cup		Continental		Other		Total	
Club	Season	Division	Apps	Goals	Apps	Goals	Apps	Goals	Apps	Goals	Apps	Goals	Apps	Goals
Caen	2003–04	Ligue 2	2	0	0	0	0	0	—		—		2	0
Caen	2004–05	Ligue 1	8	0	0	0	1	0	—		—		8	0
Caen	2005–06	Ligue 2	32	8	0	0	0	0	—		—		32	8
Caen	2006–07	Ligue 2	37	15	0	0	0	0	—		—		37	15
Caen	2007–08	Ligue 1	36	10	0	0	0	0	—		—		36	10
Caen	Total		115	33	0	0	1	0	—		—		116	33
Bordeaux	2008–09	Ligue 1	32	2	1	0	4	2	8 (Note: Six appearances in the UEFA Champions League, two appearances in the UEFA Cup)	0	—		45	4
Bordeaux	2009–10	Ligue 1	32	5	3	0	4	3	6 (Note: Appearances in UEFA Champions League)	0	—		45	8
Bordeaux	2010–11	Ligue 1	21	2	2	0	1	0	—		—		24	2
Bordeaux	2011–12	Ligue 1	34	14	2	0	1	0	—		—		37	14
Bordeaux	2012–13	Ligue 1	20	8	1	0	1	0	5 (Note: Appearances in UEFA Europa League)	4	—		27	12
Bordeaux	Total		139	31	9	0	11	5	19	4	—		178	40
Newcastle United	2012–13	Premier League	15	3	0	0	0	0	0	0	—		15	3
Newcastle United	2013–14	Premier League	35	6	1	0	3	1	—		—		39	7
Newcastle United	2014–15	Premier League	31	2	0	0	2	0	—		—		33	2
Newcastle United	2015–16	Premier League	8	0	0	0	1	0	—		—		9	0
Newcastle United	2016–17	Championship	30	5	3	1	3	1	—		—		36	7
Newcastle United	Total		119	16	4	1	9	2	0	0	—		127	19
Göztepe	2017–18	Süper Lig	30	1	1	0	="2"|—		—		—		31	1
Göztepe	2018–19	Süper Lig	16	1	6	0	—		—		—		22	1
Göztepe	Total		46	2	7	0	—		—		—		53	2
Ararat-Armenia	2019–20	Armenian Premier League	13	0	2	1	—		0	0	0 (Note: Appearances in Armenian Supercup)	0	15	1
Ararat-Armenia	2020–21	Armenian Premier League	23	0	3	1	—		4 (Note: One appearance in the UEFA Champions League, three appearances in the UEFA Europa League)	0	1	0	31	1
Ararat-Armenia	2021–22	Armenian Premier League	4	0	0	0	—		—		—		4	0
Ararat-Armenia	Total		40	0	5	2	—		4	0	1	0	50	2
Career total			459	82	25	3	21	7	23	4	1	0	529	97

== Honours ==
Bordeaux

- Ligue 1: 2008–09
- Coupe de la Ligue: 2008–09
- Trophée des Champions: 2008, 2009

Newcastle United

- EFL Championship: 2016–17

Ararat-Armenia

- Armenian Premier League: 2019–20

France-19

- UEFA European Under-19 Championship: 2005

Individual

- Ligue 2 Player of the Year: 2007
- Ligue 2 Team of the Year: 2006–07
