= Ângelo Meneses =

Portuguese footballer (born 1993)

Personal information
- Full name: Ângelo Rafael Teixeira Alpoim Meneses
- Date of birth: 3 July 1993 (age 33)
- Place of birth: Vila Nova de Famalicão, Portugal
- Height: 1.89 m (6 ft 2 in)
- Position: Centre-back

Team information
- Current team: PSMS Medan
- Number: 3

Youth career
- 2001–2004: Famalicão
- 2004–2008: Porto
- 2008–2012: Leixões

Senior career*
| Years | Team | Apps | (Gls) |
| 2012–2013 | Famalicão | 20 | (1) |
| 2013–2014 | Rio Ave | 0 | (0) |
| 2014–2015 | Oliveirense | 51 | (4) |
| 2015–2016 | Penafiel | 19 | (2) |
| 2016–2019 | Famalicão | 37 | (3) |
| 2019–2021 | Ararat-Armenia | 36 | (1) |
| 2021–2022 | Rio Ave | 8 | (0) |
| 2022–2023 | Covilhã | 22 | (0) |
| 2023–2024 | RANS Nusantara | 21 | (2) |
| 2024–2025 | Dewa United | 30 | (1) |
| 2025–2026 | Semen Padang | 29 | (1) |
| 2026– | PSMS Medan | 1 | (0) |
- * Club domestic league appearances and goals as of 13 September 2026

Ângelo Rafael Teixeira Alpoim Meneses (born 3 July 1993) is a Portuguese professional footballer who plays as a centre-back for Championship club PSMS Medan.

== Career ==
Meneses made his professional debut on 16 February 2014 with Oliveirense in a 2013–14 Segunda Liga match against Covilhã.

On 19 June 2019, Ararat-Armenia announced the signing of Meneses. He left two seasons later after amassing 36 league appearances and one goal for Ararat-Armenia in the league. He played in 53 matches and scored 2 goals in all competitions.

On 2 July 2021, he returned to Rio Ave on a one-year contract.

== Career statistics ==
As of match played 13 September 2026

Appearances and goals by club, season and competition
| Club | Season | League | | | National cup | | League cup | | Continental | | Other | | Total | |
| Club | Season | Division | Apps | Goals | Apps | Goals | Apps | Goals | Apps | Goals | Apps | Goals | Apps | Goals |
|---|---|---|---|---|---|---|---|---|---|---|---|---|---|---|
| Penafiel | 2015–16 | LigaPro | 19 | 2 | 2 | 0 | 2 | 0 | – | | – | | 23 | 2 |
| Famalicão | 2016–17 | LigaPro | 10 | 2 | 0 | 0 | 1 | 0 | – | | – | | 11 | 2 |
| Famalicão | 2017–18 | LigaPro | 9 | 0 | 0 | 0 | 1 | 1 | – | | – | | 10 | 1 |
| Famalicão | 2018–19 | LigaPro | 18 | 1 | 0 | 0 | 0 | 0 | – | | – | | 18 | 1 |
| Famalicão | Total | | 37 | 3 | 0 | 0 | 2 | 1 | 0 | 0 | 0 | 0 | 39 | 4 |
| Ararat-Armenia | 2019–20 | Armenian Premier League | 24 | 1 | 3 | 1 | – | | 8 (Note: Two appearances in the UEFA Champions League, and six appearances in the UEFA Europa League) | 0 | 1 (Note: Appearance in the Armenian Supercup) | 0 | 36 | 2 |
| Ararat-Armenia | 2020–21 | Armenian Premier League | 12 | 0 | 0 | 0 | – | | 4 (Note: One appearance in the UEFA Champions League, and three appearances in the UEFA Europa League) | 0 | 1 | 0 | 17 | 0 |
| Ararat-Armenia | Total | | 36 | 1 | 3 | 1 | 0 | 0 | 12 | 0 | 2 | 0 | 53 | 2 |
| Rio Ave | 2021–22 | Liga Portugal 2 | 8 | 0 | 3 | 0 | 2 | 0 | – | | – | | 13 | 0 |
| Covilhã | 2022–23 | Liga Portugal 2 | 22 | 0 | 0 | 0 | 3 | 0 | – | | – | | 25 | 0 |
| RANS Nusantara | 2023–24 | Liga 1 | 21 | 2 | – | | – | | – | | – | | 21 | 2 |
| Dewa United | 2024–25 | Liga 1 | 30 | 1 | – | | – | | – | | – | | 30 | 1 |
| Semen Padang | 2025–26 | Super League | 29 | 1 | – | | – | | – | | – | | 29 | 1 |
| PSMS Medan | 2026–27 | Championship | 1 | 0 | – | | 0 | 0 | – | | – | | 1 | 0 |
| Career total | | | 203 | 10 | 6 | 1 | 9 | 1 | 12 | 0 | 2 | 0 | 234 | 11 |

== Honours ==
Ararat-Armenia

- Armenian Premier League: 2019–20
- Armenian Supercup: 2019
