= Borja Gil =

Spanish footballer

Personal information
- Full name: Borja Gil Albarracín
- Date of birth: 4 December 1990 (age 35)
- Place of birth: Ceuta, Spain
- Height: 1.76 m (5 ft 9 in)
- Position: Winger

Youth career
- Valladolid

Senior career*
Years	Team	Apps	(Gls)
2009–2010	Murallas Ceuta	30	(1)
2010–2011	Unión Estepona	16	(0)
2011–2012	Villanovense	24	(0)
2012	Lucena	5	(0)
2013	Murcia B	12	(0)
2013	Murcia	1	(0)
2013–2014	Ceuta	36	(1)
2014	Conquense	1	(0)
2015–2017	Ceuta	64	(5)
2017	Yeclano	17	(2)
2017–2018	Ibiza	7	(1)
2018	Mar Menor	20	(0)
2018–2019	Barco	16	(0)
2019–2020	Lincoln Red Imps	27	(1)
- * Club domestic league appearances and goals as of 28 February 2020

Borja Gil Albarracín (born 4 December 1990) is a Spanish footballer who plays as a winger.

== Club career ==
Born in Ceuta, Gil finished his youth career with Real Valladolid, and made his senior debut with Murallas de Ceuta FC in the 2009–10 season, in the Tercera División. In August 2010 he joined Unión Estepona CF of Segunda División B, and featured sparingly for the side during the campaign, being also relegated.

Gil moved to fellow league team CF Villanovense on 6 July 2011. One year later, he signed for Lucena CF also in the third division. After suffering a knee injury, he terminated his contract on 29 December 2012.

On 15 January 2013, Gil joined Real Murcia, initially assigned to the reserves in the fourth tier. On 21 April he made his first-team debut, coming on as a late substitute in a 1–1 away draw against FC Barcelona B in the Segunda División.

Gil rejected a new deal in July 2013, and later signed for hometown club AD Ceuta FC. On 10 July of the following year he moved to UB Conquense, being deemed surplus to requirements a month later.

Gil severed his ties with Conquense in November 2014, and returned to Ceuta in January 2015. He continued to play in lower-league or amateur football until his retirement, also having a spell in the Gibraltar Premier Division with Lincoln Red Imps FC.
