= Ogana Louis =

Nigerian footballer

Personal information
- Full name: Ogana Ugochukwu Louis
- Date of birth: 29 December 1995 (age 30)
- Place of birth: Lagos, Nigeria
- Height: 1.85 m (6 ft 1 in)
- Position: Forward

Youth career
- Ribeirão

Senior career*
Years	Team	Apps	(Gls)
2014–2015	Ribeirão	34	(15)
2015–2017	Braga B	77	(18)
2018	Žalgiris	29	(11)
2019–2021	Ararat-Armenia	39	(9)
2022–2023	Sreenidi Deccan	37	(12)
2023–2024	Churchill Brothers	22	(7)
2024–2025	Tala'ea El Gaish		
- * Club domestic league appearances and goals as of 24 November 2025

Ogana Ugochukwu Louis (born 29 December 1995), is a Nigerian professional footballer who last played as a forward for Tala'ea El Gaish.

== Club career ==
On 30 September 2015, Louis made his professional debut with Braga B in a 2015–16 LigaPro match against Sporting Covilhã.

On 19 February 2018, he joined FK Žalgiris, scoring 11 goals during his only season with the club, leaving at the end of the season.

On 28 February 2019, Ararat-Armenia announced the signing of Louis. On 15 January 2021, Ararat-Armenia confirmed that Louis had left the club after his contract had expired.

=== Sreenidi Deccan ===
On 2 February 2022, Louis joined Indian club Sreenidi Deccan, one of the new I-League entrants.

He made his debut for the club, on 3 March 2022, against TRAU in a 3–1 win, in which he scored a goal. After finishing fourth in group stage with six wins in twelve matches, they moved to the championship stage. At the end, the club finished their maiden league campaign in third place with 32 points in 18 matches, and won the last match against Churchill Brothers on 14 May.

== Career statistics ==
=== Club ===
As of 17 April 2024

Club	Season	League			Cup		Continental		Other		Total	
Club	Season	Division	Apps	Goals	Apps	Goals	Apps	Goals	Apps	Goals	Apps	Goals
Ribeirão	2013–14	LigaPro	4	0	0	0	–		–		4	0
Ribeirão	2014–15	LigaPro	30	15	1	0	–		–		31	15
Ribeirão	Total		34	15	1	0	-	-	-	-	35	15
Braga B	2015–16	LigaPro	29	8	–		–		–		29	8
Braga B	2016–17	LigaPro	30	6	–		–		–		30	6
Braga B	2017–18	LigaPro	18	4	–		–		–		18	4
Braga B	Total		77	18	-	-	-	-	-	-	77	18
Žalgiris	2018	A Lyga	29	11	4	2	6	0	–		39	13
Ararat-Armenia	2018–19	Armenian Premier League	10	4	1	0	–		–		11	4
Ararat-Armenia	2019–20	Armenian Premier League	20	3	4	8	6	2	1	0	31	13
Ararat-Armenia	2020–21	Armenian Premier League	9	2	0	0	3	0	1	0	13	2
Ararat-Armenia	Total		39	9	5	8	9	2	2	0	55	19
Sreenidi Deccan	2021–22	I-League	16	6	0	0	–		–		16	6
Sreenidi Deccan	2022–23	I-League	21	6	3 (Note: Appearance(s) in Super Cup)	0	–		–		24	6
Sreenidi Deccan	2023–24	I-League	22	7	0	0	–		–		22	7
Total		59	19	3	0	0	0	0	0	62	19	
Career total			238	72	13	10	15	2	2	0	268	84

== Honours ==
Ararat-Armenia

- Armenian Premier League: 2018–19, 2019–20
- Armenian Supercup: 2019

Sreenidi Deccan

- I-League runner-up: 2022–23

Individual

- A Lyga Team of the Year: 2018
