= Kódjo Kassé Alphonse =

Ivorian footballer

Kódjo
Personal information
- Full name: Kódjo Kassé Alphonse
- Date of birth: 28 May 1993 (age 33)
- Place of birth: Abidjan, Ivory Coast
- Height: 1.78 m (5 ft 10 in)
- Position: Midfielder

Team information
- Current team: Bettembourg
- Number: 66

Youth career
- −2011: Stade d'Abidjan
- 2011−2012: Desp. Chaves

Senior career*
Years	Team	Apps	(Gls)
2012−2013	Mirandela	30	(0)
2013−2017	Gil Vicente	81	(6)
2013−2014	→ Oliveirense (loan)	19	(0)
2014−2015	→ Académico de Viseu (loan)	19	(0)
2017−2018	Feirense	6	(0)
2018	→ Gil Vicente (loan)	18	(0)
2019−2020	Ararat-Armenia	39	(2)
2021	Taraz	22	(0)
2022	Alashkert	14	(0)
2023	Telavi	6	(0)
2024	Palencia	13	(0)
2024	Koeppchen Wormeldange	14	(0)
2025–	Bettembourg	24	(0)
- * Club domestic league appearances and goals as of 13 June 2026

Kódjo Kassé Alphonse (born 28 May 1993) is an Ivorian professional football player who plays for Luxembourg National Division side Bettembourg.

== Career ==
He made his professional debut in the Segunda Liga for Oliveirense on 14 September 2013 in a game against Tondela.

On 25 February 2019, Kódjo signed for Ararat-Armenia. On 16 October, Kódjo left Ararat-Armenia by mutual consent after playing 55 games and scoring 3 goals for the club.

On 20 February 2021, FC Taraz announced the signing of Kódjo.

== Career statistics ==
=== Club ===
As of match played 28 May 2022

Appearances and goals by club, season and competition
Club	Season	League			National Cup		League Cup		Continental		Other		Total	
Club	Season	Division	Apps	Goals	Apps	Goals	Apps	Goals	Apps	Goals	Apps	Goals	Apps	Goals
Mirandela	2012–13	Portuguese Second Division	30	0	1	0	–		–		–		31	0
Gil Vicente	2013–14	Primeira Liga	2	0	0	0	0	0	–		–		2	0
Gil Vicente	2014–15	Primeira Liga	0	0	0	0	0	0	–		–		0	0
Gil Vicente	2015–16	LigaPro	40	3	2	0	1	0	–		–		43	3
Gil Vicente	2016–17	LigaPro	39	3	1	0	2	0	–		–		42	3
Gil Vicente	Total		81	6	3	0	3	0	-	-	-	-	87	6
Oliveirense (loan)	2013–14	Segunda Liga	19	0	0	0	0	0	–		–		19	0
Académico de Viseu (loan)	2014–15	Segunda Liga	19	0	0	0	5	0	–		–		24	0
Feirense	2017–18	Primeira Liga	2	0	0	0	1	0	–		–		3	0
Feirense	2018–19	Primeira Liga	4	0	1	0	1	0	–		–		6	0
Feirense	Total		6	0	1	0	2	0	-	-	-	-	9	0
Gil Vicente (loan)	2017–18	LigaPro	18	0	0	0	0	0	–		–		18	0
Ararat-Armenia	2018–19	Armenian Premier League	14	1	2	0	–		–		–		16	1
Ararat-Armenia	2019–20	Armenian Premier League	22	1	2	0	–		8	1	1	0	33	2
Ararat-Armenia	2020–21	Armenian Premier League	3	0	0	0	–		2	0	1	0	6	0
Ararat-Armenia	Total		39	2	4	0	-	-	10	1	2	0	55	3
Taraz	2021	Kazakhstan Premier League	22	0	6	0	–		–		–		28	0
Alashkert	2021–22	Armenian Premier League	14	0	0	0	0	0	0	0	0	0	14	0
Telavi	2023	Erovnuli Liga	6	0	0	0	-		-		-		6	0
Career total			254	8	15	0	10	0	10	1	2	0	291	9

== Honours ==
=== Club ===
Ararat-Armenia

- Armenian Premier League (2): 2018–19, 2019–20
- Armenian Supercup (1): 2019
