= Ilja Antonov =

Estonian footballer (born 1992)

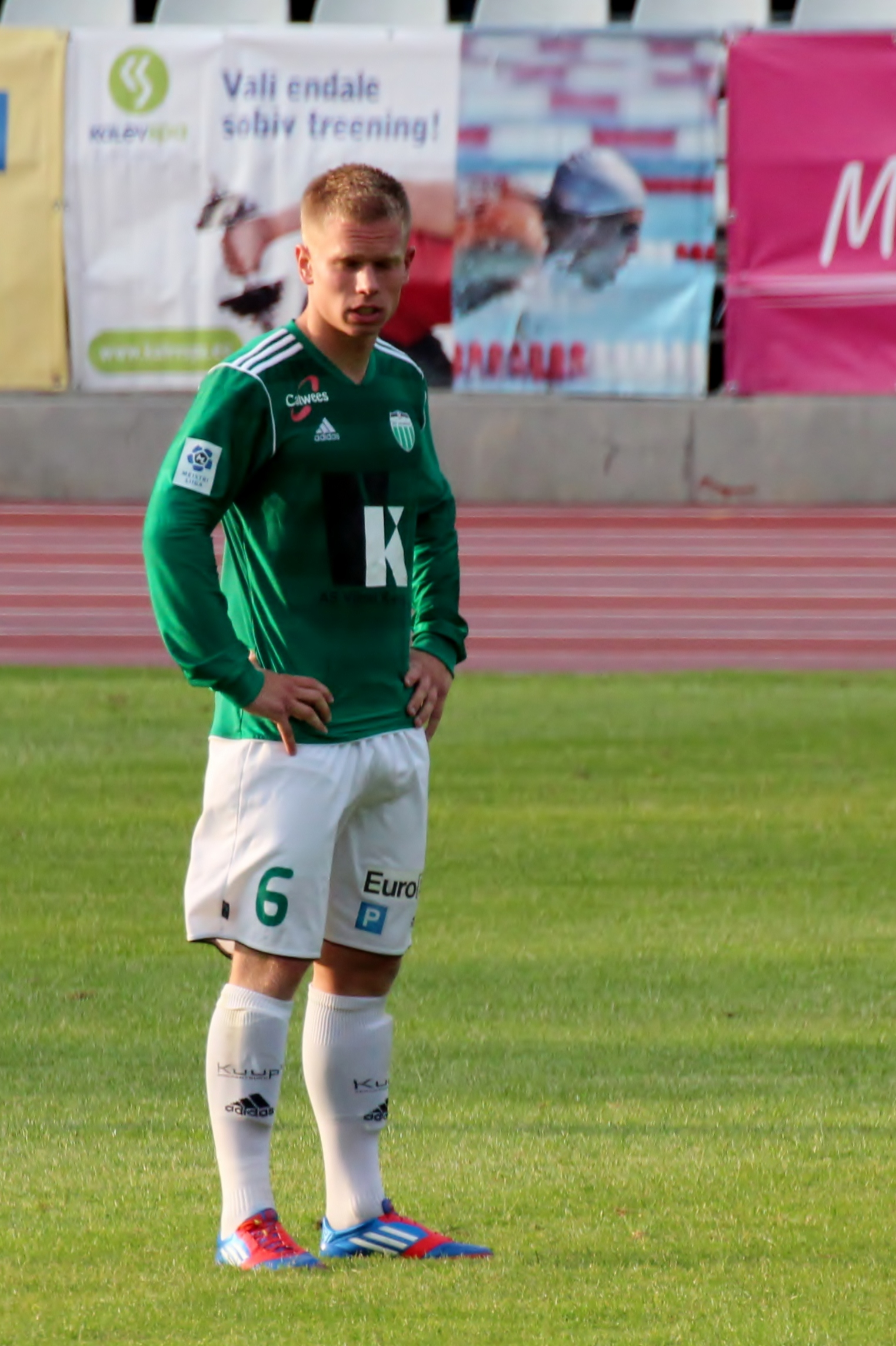
- Antonov with Levadia in 2012

Personal information
- Full name: Ilja Antonov
- Date of birth: 5 December 1992 (age 33)
- Place of birth: Tallinn, Estonia
- Height: 1.73 m (5 ft 8 in)
- Position: Midfielder

Team information
- Current team: Flora
- Number: 67

Youth career
- 2002–2004: Spartak
- 2005: Merkuur-Juunior
- 2006–2010: Puuma

Senior career*
Years	Team	Apps	(Gls)
2008	Ararat Tallinn	12	(2)
2009	Kiviõli Tamme Auto	25	(11)
2009–2010	Kiviõli Tamme Auto II	5	(2)
2010–2011	Puuma	56	(24)
2012–2016	Levadia	140	(10)
2015	Levadia II	1	(0)
2017	SV Horn	14	(0)
2017–2018	Rudar Velenje	25	(0)
2018–2019	Hermannstadt	17	(0)
2019–2020	Ararat-Armenia	18	(0)
2021–2023	Levadia	45	(0)
2023	Nomme Kalju	13	(1)
2023–2024	Corvinul Hunedoara	7	(0)
2024–2025	Al-Shabab SC		
2025	Kuressaare	15	(0)
2026–	Flora	30	(2)

International career^{‡}
2010–2011	Estonia (futsal)	10	(1)
2012–2013	Estonia U21	15	(2)
2012–2021	Estonia	52	(2)
- * Club domestic league appearances and goals as of 17 November 2026 ‡ National team caps and goals as of 30 August 2022

Ilja Antonov (born 5 December 1992) is an Estonian professional footballer who plays as a midfielder for Estonian Meistriliiga club Flora.

== Club career ==
=== Puuma ===
Antonov came through the Puuma youth system. He played for Ararat and Kiviõli Tamme Auto, before making his debut for Puuma's first team in 2010.

=== Levadia ===
On 8 March 2012, Antonov signed a two-year contract Meistriliiga with Levadia. He made his debut in the Meistriliiga on 10 March 2012, in a 0–0 draw against Nõmme Kalju. Antonov scored three goals in 33 games as Levadia finished the 2012 season as runners up. He won two consecutive Meistriliiga titles in 2013 and 2014.

=== SV Horn ===
On 29 January 2017, Antonov joined Austrian Erste Liga club SV Horn on a contract until 2019. He was released by the club in May 2017, following their relegation in the 2016–17 season.

=== Rudar Velenje ===
On 14 July 2017, Antonov signed a two-year contract with PrvaLiga club Rudar Velenje. He made his debut in the PrvaLiga on 22 July 2017, in a 3–1 home victory over Ankaran Hrvatini.

=== Hermannstadt ===
On 21 June 2018, Antonov signed for Liga I club Hermannstadt on a two-year deal.

=== Ararat-Armenia ===
On 24 June 2019, Antonov signed for Ararat-Armenia. On 22 August 2019, he scored a winning goal against F91 Dudelange in Europa League play-off round. On 14 July 2020 Antonov won the league title with Ararat-Armenia, becoming the first Estonian to win the Armenian league. He left the club in December 2020.

== International career ==
Antonov began his youth career in 2012 with the Estonia under-21 team, making 15 appearances and scoring 2 goals.

On 1 November 2012, Antonov was called up by Tarmo Rüütli for a friendly against Oman on 8 November 2012, and made his senior international debut for Estonia in the 2–1 away victory. He scored his first goal for Estonia on 17 November 2015, in a 3–0 friendly victory over Saint Kitts and Nevis.

=== International goals ===
As of match played 10 October 2017. Estonia score listed first, score column indicates score after each Antonov goal.

International goals by date, venue, cap, opponent, score, result and competition
No.	Date	Venue	Cap	Opponent	Score	Result	Competition
1	17 November 2015	A. Le Coq Arena, Tallinn, Estonia	21	Saint Kitts and Nevis	1–0	3–0	Friendly
2	10 October 2017	A. Le Coq Arena, Tallinn, Estonia	35	Bosnia and Herzegovina	1–1	1–2	2018 FIFA World Cup qualification

== Honours ==
=== Club ===
Levadia

- Meistriliiga (2) : 2013, 2014
- Estonian Cup (2) : 2011–12, 2013–14
- Estonian Supercup (2) : 2013, 2015

Ararat-Armenia

- Armenian Premier League (1): 2019–20
- Armenian Supercup (1): 2019
