= Dmitry Guz =

Russian footballer (born 1988)

Personal information
- Full name: Dmitry Vladimirovich Guz
- Date of birth: 15 May 1988 (age 38)
- Place of birth: Krasny Sulin, Rostov Oblast, Russian SFSR, Soviet Union
- Height: 1.79 m (5 ft 10 in)
- Position: Defender

Youth career
- Nika Krasny Sulin

Senior career*
Years	Team	Apps	(Gls)
2008	Nika Krasny Sulin	28	(2)
2009	Bataysk-2007	34	(3)
2010–2014	Rotor Volgograd	92	(5)
2014–2015	Tyumen	17	(0)
2015–2016	Luch-Energiya Vladivostok	35	(4)
2016–2018	Tyumen	71	(1)
2018–2020	Ararat-Armenia	45	(4)
2020–2021	Urartu	9	(0)
2021	Atyrau	25	(2)
2022	Alashkert	16	(0)
2022–2023	Kaluga	32	(3)
2023	Shinnik Yaroslavl	19	(0)
- * Club domestic league appearances and goals

Dmitry Vladimirovich Guz (Russian: Дми́трий Влади́мирович Гузь; born 15 May 1988) is a Russian former professional association football player.

== Club career ==
Guz played 6 seasons in the Russian Football National League for FC Rotor Volgograd and FC Tyumen.

On 19 July 2020, Ararat-Armenia announced that Guz had left the club after two-year with his contract expiring. On 21 July 2020, Guz signed for FC Urartu.

On 25 January 2022, Alashkert announced the signing of Guz.

== Career statistics ==
=== Club ===
As of match played 28 May 2022

Appearances and goals by club, season and competition
Club	Season	League			National Cup		Continental		Other		Total	
Club	Season	Division	Apps	Goals	Apps	Goals	Apps	Goals	Apps	Goals	Apps	Goals
Rotor Volgograd	2010	First Division	20	1	1	0	-		-		20	1
Rotor Volgograd	2011–12	Second Division	31	4	3	1	-		-		31	4
Rotor Volgograd	2012–13	FNL	16	0	1	1	-		-		16	0
Rotor Volgograd	2013–14	FNL	25	0	3	0	-		-		25	0
Rotor Volgograd	Total		92	5	8	2	-	-	-	-	100	7
Tyumen	2014–15	FNL	17	0	1	0	-		-		18	0
Luch-Energiya Vladivostok	2015–16	FNL	35	4	0	0	-		-		35	4
Tyumen	2016–17	FNL	35	0	1	0	-		-		36	0
Tyumen	2017–18	FNL	36	1	1	0	-		-		37	1
Tyumen	Total		71	1	2	0	-	-	-	-	73	1
Ararat-Armenia	2018–19	Armenian Premier League	24	1	5	0	-		-		29	1
Ararat-Armenia	2019–20	Armenian Premier League	21	3	2	0	7 (Note: Two appearances in UEFA Champions League and five appearances in the UEFA Europa League)	0	1 (Note: Appearance in Armenian Supercup)	0	31	3
Ararat-Armenia	Total		45	4	7	0	7	0	1	0	60	4
Urartu	2020–21	Armenian Premier League	9	0	1	1	-		-		10	1
Atyrau	2021	Kazakhstan Premier League	25	2	5	0	-		-		30	2
Alashkert	2021–22	Armenian Premier League	16	0	0	0	0 (Note: Zero appearances in UEFA Champions League, zero appearances in the UEFA Europa League and zero appearances in the UEFA Europa Conference League)	0	0	0	16	0
Career total			310	16	24	3	7	0	1	0	342	19

== Honours ==
=== Club ===
Ararat-Armenia

- Armenian Premier League (2): 2018–19, 2019–20
- Armenian Supercup (1): 2019
