= Zakaria Sanogo =

Burkinabé footballer

Personal information
- Date of birth: 11 December 1996 (age 29)
- Place of birth: Bobo-Dioulasso, Burkina Faso
- Height: 1.69 m (5 ft 7 in)
- Position: Winger

Senior career*
Years	Team	Apps	(Gls)
2015–2016	Strasbourg B	19	(7)
2016–2019	Rahimo FC		
2016–2017	→ Wolfsberger AC (loan)	17	(1)
2017–2019	→ TSV Hartberg (loan)	62	(9)
2019–2022	Ararat-Armenia	69	(6)
2022	JS Kabylie	5	(0)
2023–2024	Rahimo FC		
2024	Alashkert	9	(0)
2025	AS Douanes		

International career^{‡}
2017–	Burkina Faso	26	(1)
- * Club domestic league appearances and goals as of 18 July 2025 ‡ National team caps and goals as of 09:06, 31 May 2022 (UTC)

Zakaria Sanogo (born 11 December 1996) is a Burkinabé professional footballer who plays as a winger for the Burkina Faso national team.

== Career ==
On 5 July 2019, Sanogo signed for Ararat-Armenia. On 4 June 2022, Ararat-Armenia announced that Sanogo's contract had expired and he would leave the club. On June 24, 2022, Sanogo signed for JS Kabylie.

On 1 August 2024, Armenian Premier League club Alashkert announced the signing of Sanogo. On 1 November 2024, Alashkert announced the departure of Sanogo alongside Vadym Paramonov, Bladimir Díaz and Murilo Rosa.

== Career statistics ==
=== Club ===
As of match played 28 May 2022

Appearances and goals by club, season and competition
Club	Season	League			Cup		Continental		Other		Total	
Club	Season	Division	Apps	Goals	Apps	Goals	Apps	Goals	Apps	Goals	Apps	Goals
Ararat-Armenia	2019–20	Armenian Premier League	24	3	5	0	6 (Note: Two appearances in the UEFA Champions League and four appearances in the UEFA Europa League)	0	1 (Note: Appearance in the Armenian Supercup)	0	36	3
Ararat-Armenia	2020–21	Armenian Premier League	23	1	4	1	4 (Note: One appearance in the UEFA Champions League and three appearances in the UEFA Europa League)	0	1	0	32	2
Ararat-Armenia	2021–22	Armenian Premier League	22	2	2	0	-		-		24	2
Ararat-Armenia	Total		69	6	11	1	10	0	2	0	92	7
Career total			69	6	11	1	10	0	2	0	92	7

=== International ===
As of match played 12 June 2021

Appearances and goals by national team and year
National team	Year	Apps	Goals
Burkina Faso	2017	1	0
Burkina Faso	2018	3	0
Burkina Faso	2019	3	0
Burkina Faso	2020	3	0
Burkina Faso	2021	11	1
Burkina Faso	2022	5	0
Total		26	1

Scores and results list Burkina Faso's goal tally first, score column indicates score after each Sanogo goal.

List of international goals scored by Zakaria Sanogo
No.	Date	Venue	Opponent	Score	Result	Competition	Ref.
1	16 November 2021	Mustapha Tchaker Stadium, Blida, Algeria	Algeria	1–1	2–2	2022 FIFA World Cup qualification	

== Honours ==
Ararat-Armenia

- Armenian Premier League: 2019–20
- Armenian Supercup: 2019
