= Stefan Čupić =

Serbian footballer (born 1994)

Stefan Čupić Стефан Чупић
Personal information
- Full name: Stefan Čupić
- Date of birth: 7 May 1994 (age 32)
- Place of birth: Niš, FR Yugoslavia
- Height: 1.93 m (6 ft 4 in)
- Position: Goalkeeper

Team information
- Current team: Lincoln Red Imps
- Number: 13

Youth career
- 1999–2006: Radnički Niš
- 2006–2012: OFK Beograd

Senior career*
Years	Team	Apps	(Gls)
2010–2016	OFK Beograd	67	(0)
2012	→ Dorćol (loan)	14	(0)
2016	→ OFK Bačka (loan)	8	(0)
2017	Sarpsborg 08	0	(0)
2018	Voždovac	8	(0)
2019–2021	Ararat-Armenia	15	(0)
2021–2022	Olympiakos Nicosia	4	(0)
2022	FK Radnički 1923		
2023	Rad	7	(0)
2023	Jhapa FC		
2024–2025	TransINVEST	14	(0)
2025–	Lincoln Red Imps	9	(0)

International career
2010–2011	Serbia U17		
2011–2012	Serbia U18	2	(0)
2012–2013	Serbia U19	2	(0)
2014–2016	Serbia U21	2	(0)
2015	Serbia U23	1	(0)
Medal record
Gold medal – first place	UEFA Under-19 Championship	2013
- * Club domestic league appearances and goals as of 2 May 2025

Stefan Čupić (Serbian Cyrillic: Стефан Чупић; born 7 May 1994) is a Serbian professional footballer who plays as a goalkeeper for Lincoln Red Imps.

== Club career ==
=== OFK Beograd ===
Born in Niš, Čupić started playing football with local club Radnički, but moved to OFK Beograd in 2006. Čupić was promoted in the first team for the 2010–11 qualification, but stayed with youth team until summer 2012. He signed his first four-year professional contract with OFK Beograd ending of 2012, after he spent the first half of 2012–13 season as a loaned player with Serbian League Belgrade side Dorćol. Čupić made his professional SuperLiga debut for OFK Beograd on 6 April 2013, against Javor Ivanjica. At the beginning of 2014, Čupić was loaned to Dinamo Pančevo, but returned in OFK Beograd after a week and spent the whole season as a reserve choice. He also played in the last 2 fixtures of the 2013–14 season. For the first 2 seasons he spent with the first team, Čupić made 3 SuperLiga appearances at total, but was promoted as the first choice goalkeeper for the 2014–15 Serbian SuperLiga season taking jersey number 1. After 5 cleansheets on 15 games, he was elected for the best debutant in 2014. After Bogdan Planić's injury, coach Dejan Đurđević gave a captain armband to Čupić several fixtures before the end of season. Čupić also made 36 league and 3 cup matches for the 2015–16 season after which OFK Beograd relegated to the Serbian First League. Čupić also started new season with club, but missed opening matches and moved on six-month loan to OFK Bačka in last day of the summer transfer window 2016.

=== Sarpsborg 08 FF ===
On 20 January 2017, Čupić signed a two-year deal with Sarpsborg 08. While with the club, Čupić spent the whole 2017 Eliteserien campaign as a back-up choice for Anders Kristiansen. During the season, Čupić also appeared in the Norwegian Football Cup, making several appearances.

=== Voždovac ===
On 10 February 2018, Čupić returned to the Serbian SuperLiga side Voždovac, penning a two-and-a-half-year deal with the club. He chose to wear number 1 jersey after Zoran Popović left the club. Čupić made his debut for Voždovac in 3–2 victory over Napredak Kruševac on 23 February 2018.

=== FC Ararat-Armenia ===
On 16 January 2019, Čupić joined Armenian club FC Ararat-Armenia. On 27 January 2021, Ararat-Armenia confirmed that Čupić had left the club to join Olympiakos Nicosia for an undisclosed fee.

=== Olympiakos Nicosia ===
On 27 January 2021 he joined Olympiakos Nicosia. In the first six months at the club he had some good appearances but was mostly second goalkeeper. In the 2022 season he only made one appearance.

== International career ==
Čupić was a member of U17 and U18 levels until 2012 when he joined Serbia national under-19 football team. During the 2013 UEFA European Under-19 Championship, Čupić was mostly used as a reserve for Predrag Rajković, and also played match France on 26 July 2016. After he won the championship, Čupić overgrown U19 selection and became a member of Serbia U21 in 2014. Coach of Serbia national under-23 football team, Milan Rastavac invited him to squad for a friendly match against Qatar in December 2015.

== Career statistics ==
=== Club ===
As of match played 6 December 2020

Appearances and goals by club, season and competition
Club	Season	League			Cup		Continental		Other		Total	
Club	Season	Division	Apps	Goals	Apps	Goals	Apps	Goals	Apps	Goals	Apps	Goals
OFK Beograd	2010–11	Serbian SuperLiga	0	0	0	0	0	0	—		0	0
OFK Beograd	2011–12	Serbian SuperLiga	0	0	0	0	—		—		0	0
OFK Beograd	2012–13	Serbian SuperLiga	1	0	0	0	—		—		1	0
OFK Beograd	2013–14	Serbian SuperLiga	2	0	0	0	—		—		2	0
OFK Beograd	2014–15	Serbian SuperLiga	28	0	1	0	—		—		29	0
OFK Beograd	2015–16	Serbian SuperLiga	36	0	3	0	—		—		39	0
OFK Beograd	2016–17	Serbian First League	0	0	—		—		—		0	0
OFK Beograd	Total		67	0	4	0	0	0	—		71	0
Dorćol (loan)	2012–13	Serbian League Belgrade	14	0	—		—		—		14	0
OFK Bačka (loan)	2016–17	Serbian SuperLiga	8	0	1	0	—		—		9	0
Sarpsborg 08	2017	Eliteserien	0	0	5	0	—		—		5	0
Voždovac	2017–18	Serbian SuperLiga	4	0	—		—		—		4	0
Ararat-Armenia	2018–19	Armenian Premier League	3	0	1	0	–		–		4	0
Ararat-Armenia	2019–20	Armenian Premier League	6	0	3	0	3	0	1	0	13	0
Ararat-Armenia	2020–21	Armenian Premier League	6	0	0	0	4	0	1	0	11	0
Ararat-Armenia	Total		15	0	4	0	7	0	2	0	28	0
Career total			108	0	14	0	7	0	2	0	131	0

=== Club ===
Ararat-Armenia

- Armenian Premier League (2): 2018–19, 2019–20
- Armenian Supercup (1): 2019

=== International ===
Serbia U19

- UEFA European Under-19 Championship (1) : 2013
