= Marcos Pérez (footballer, born 1989) =

Spanish footballer

Personal information
- Full name: Marcos Luis Pérez Trujillo
- Date of birth: 30 September 1989 (age 37)
- Place of birth: Lucena, Spain
- Height: 1.75 m (5 ft 9 in)
- Position: Defender

Team information
- Current team: Puente Genil

Youth career
- Lucentino Industrial
- Córdoba

Senior career*
Years	Team	Apps	(Gls)
2007–2010	Córdoba B	37	(1)
2008–2009	→ Antequera (loan)	24	(0)
2009–2010	→ Écija (loan)	28	(0)
2010–2013	Osasuna B	66	(0)
2011	Osasuna	1	(0)
2013–2014	Lucena	21	(1)
2014–2015	La Hoya Lorca	37	(0)
2016	Ciudad Lucena	8	(1)
2016–2017	Lorca Deportiva	39	(0)
2017–2018	Peña Deportiva	33	(0)
2018–2019	Lorca Deportiva	21	(0)
2019–2020	Lincoln Red Imps	21	(0)
2020–2024	Ciudad de Lucena	120	(5)
2024–	Puente Genil	6	(1)
- * Club domestic league appearances and goals as of 13 October 2024

Marcos Luis Pérez Trujillo (born 30 September 1989), sometimes known as just Marcos, is a Spanish footballer who plays for Puente Genil as a defender.

== Club career ==
Born in Lucena, Córdoba, Andalusia, Marcos finished his graduation with Córdoba CF, and made his senior debuts with the reserves in the Tercera División in the 2006–07 season. In the summer of 2008 he was loaned to Antequera CF of the Segunda División B, and joined fellow third-tier club Écija Balompié, also on loan, for the following campaign.

On 15 July 2010 Marcos signed with Villarreal CF B of the Segunda División. However, after being demoted to the C-team, he terminated his contract and joined CA Osasuna B. He made his debut for CA Osasuna's first team and first appearance in La Liga on 6 November 2011, playing the last 31 minutes in a 1–7 away loss against Real Madrid.

On 27 June 2013 Marcos moved to his hometown, agreeing to a deal with Lucena CF of the Segunda B. The following March he terminated his contract and moved to another third-tier team, La Hoya Lorca CF.
