= Rochdi Achenteh =

Dutch-born Moroccan footballer

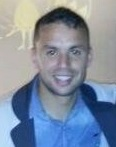

Personal information
- Full name: Rochdi Achenteh
- Date of birth: 7 March 1988 (age 38)
- Place of birth: Eindhoven, Netherlands
- Height: 1.71 m (5 ft 7 in)
- Positions: Left-back; central midfielder

Youth career
- –1997: Brabantia
- 1997–2008: PSV

Senior career*
Years	Team	Apps	(Gls)
2008–2011	FC Eindhoven	89	(6)
2011–2014	PEC Zwolle	83	(2)
2014–2016	Vitesse	45	(1)
2016	Willem II	13	(0)
2016–2017	Go Ahead Eagles	16	(0)
2017–2019	FC Eindhoven	32	(0)
2019–2020	Ararat-Armenia	14	(0)
2021–2022	Kozakken Boys	31	(0)
2022–2024	Wezel Sport	60	(1)
Total		383	(10)

International career
2007	Morocco U23	1	(0)
2014–2015	Morocco	3	(0)
- * Club domestic league appearances and goals as of 4 February 2026

Rochdi Achenteh (born 7 March 1988) is a Moroccan professional footballer who plays as a left back.

== Club career ==
Achenteh came through the PSV Eindhoven youth system and later played for FC Eindhoven and PEC Zwolle, before leaving Zwolle for Vitesse in January 2014. In January 2016, Achenteh was snapped up by Willem II.

On 25 June 2019, Ararat-Armenia announced the signing of Achenteh. On 18 July 2020, Achenteh left Ararat-Armenia.

== International career ==
Achenteh made his debut for Morocco in a November 2014 Africa Nations Cup qualification match against Benin.

== Honours ==
=== Ararat-Armenia ===
- Armenian Premier League (1): 2019–20
