= Aleksandar Damchevski =

Macedonian footballer (born 1992)

Aleksandar Damčevski
Personal information
- Date of birth: 21 November 1992 (age 33)
- Place of birth: Strasbourg, France
- Height: 1.93 m (6 ft 4 in)
- Position: Centre back

Team information
- Current team: Tuttocuoio
- Number: 7

Senior career*
Years	Team	Apps	(Gls)
2012–2013	Luzern II	8	(0)
2013–2014	SC Kriens	9	(0)
2014	Chernomorets Burgas	16	(0)
2014–2015	NAC	13	(0)
2016–2017	Atyrau	24	(3)
2017	Mezőkövesd	3	(0)
2017–2018	Ermis Aradippou	24	(1)
2018–2021	Ararat-Armenia	38	(1)
2021–2022	Partizani	7	(0)
2022–2023	KF Bylis	34	(1)
2023	Kitchee	2	(0)
2023–2024	Avezzano	13	(0)
2024	Livorno	1	(0)
2024–2025	Acireale	21	(0)
2025–	Tuttocuoio	0	(0)

International career
2013–2014	Macedonia U21	2	(0)
2014	Macedonia	4	(0)
- * Club domestic league appearances and goals as of 15 January 2026

Aleksandar Damčevski (Macedonian: Александар Дамчевски, born 21 November 1992) is a professional footballer who plays as a centre back for Italian Serie D club Tuttocuoio. Born in France, he made four appearances for the Macedonia national team in 2014.

== Club career ==
In January 2014, Damčevski joined Bulgarian club Chernomorets Burgas. He made his debut on 24 February in a 2–1 home loss against CSKA Sofia, coming on as a first-half substitute. He played 14 games for the club, but Chernomorets were relegated at the end of the season and his contract was terminated by mutual consent.

Following his release from Chernomorets, Damčevski was taken on trial by Dutch side NAC Breda. After an impressive trial spell he signed a contract on 14 July 2014.

After his release from NAC Breda, Damčevski was taken on trial by Serbian side Partizan.

In February 2016, Damčevski signed for FC Atyrau of the Kazakhstan Premier League.

In February 2017, Damčevski joined Mezőkövesd.

On 12 July 2023, Damčevski joined Hong Kong Premier League club Kitchee.

== International career ==
Damčevski made his senior debut for Macedonia in a May 2014 friendly match against Qatar and has, as of March 2020, earned a total of four caps, scoring no goals. His latest international was an October 2014 European Championship qualification match against Ukraine.

== Honours ==
Ararat-Armenia

- Armenian Premier League: 2018–19, 2019–20
- Armenian Supercup: 2019
