= List of FC Ararat-Armenia records and statistics =

Football Club Ararat-Armenia is an Armenian professional football club based in Yerevan. The club was formed in 2017 as FC Avan Academy before changing their name to FC Ararat-Moskva at the beginning of 2018, and then FC Ararat-Armenia upon gaining promotion to the Armenian Premier League in the summer of 2018.This article encompasses the major records set by the club and their players in the Armenian Premier League, Armenian Cup and European competitions. The player records section includes details of the club's goalscorers and those who have made more than 50 appearances in first-team competitions.

== Players ==
As of match played 5 November 2026

The list is includes all players who have joined and played for the club since its inception in 2017.

Academy graduate
Current Ararat-Armenia player
Current Ararat-Armenia player and academy graduate
Played for Ararat-Armenia on loan

=== 100 or more appearances ===
	Name	Years	League apps	League goals	Cup apps	Cup goals	Super Cup apps	Super Cup goals	Europe apps	Europe goals	Total apps	Total goals	International Career
1	(Russia) Armen Ambartsumyan	2018–Present	200	17	31	0	4	0	24	0	259	17	Russia U21
2	(Armenia) Karen Muradyan	2021–Present	152	1	17	0	2	0	25	1	196	2	Armenia
3	(Kenya) Alwyn Tera	2021–Present	147	8	12	1	1	0	21	0	182	9	Kenya
4	(Armenia) Junior Bueno	2021–Present	130	4	18	0	2	0	23	1	173	5	Armenia (Note: Bueno was born in Colombia, but went on to represent Armenia.)
5	(Armenia) Zhirayr Shaghoyan	2017–Present	122	25	18	1	2	0	14	1	156	27	Armenia
6	(Armenia) Edgar Grigoryan	2023–Present	90	0	12	0	2	0	23	0	127	0	Armenia
7	(Cape Verde) Mailson Lima	2019–2021, 2021–2023	102	33	9	1	2	2	12	5	125	41	Cape Verde (Note: Lima was born in the Netherlands, but went on to represent Cape Verde.)
8	(Armenia) Artur Serobyan	2020–Present	92	22	10	2	1	0	20	4	123	28	Armenia
9	(Armenia) Artyom Avanesyan	2018–2024	101	7	12	6	0	0	6	0	119	13	Armenia (Note: Avanesyan was born in the Russia, but went on to represent Armenia.)
9	(Brazil) Alemão	2020–2024	97	8	11	1	0	0	10	1	119	10	-
11	(Nigeria) Tenton Yenne	2022–2025	94	43	9	1	1	1	10	2	114	47	-
12	(Colombia) Jonathan Duarte	2022–2026	80	14	10	1	1	0	10	2	101	17	-

=== 25–99 appearances ===
	Name	Years	League apps	League goals	Cup apps	Cup goals	Super Cup apps	Super Cup goals	Europe apps	Europe goals	Total apps	Total goals	International Career
13	(Burkina Faso) Zakaria Sanogo	2019–2022	69	6	11	1	2	0	10	0	92	7	Burkina Faso
14	(Armenia) Kamo Hovhannisyan	2024–Present	61	2	12	0	2	0	12	1	87	3	Armenia
15	(Netherlands) Furdjel Narsingh	2019–2022	66	5	7	0	0	0	12	0	85	5	Netherlands U19
15	(Russia) Dmitry Abakumov	2018–2023	68	0	12	0	0	0	5	0	85	0	Russia U19
17	(Ivory Coast) Wilfried Eza	2021–2023	68	22	4	3	0	0	5	2	77	27	-
17	(Kenya) Amos Nondi	2023–2025	63	1	6	0	0	0	8	0	77	1	Kenya
19	(Armenia) Davit Terteryan	2021–2024	69	0	6	1	0	0	1	0	76	1	Armenia
20	(Nigeria) Yusuf Otubanjo	2020–2022	58	26	9	3	1	0	4	0	72	29	Nigeria U17
21	(Nigeria) Matthew Gbomadu	2023–2026	54	9	6	0	1	0	8	0	69	9	-
22	(Portugal) João Queirós	2024–2026	52	3	7	0	1	0	8	0	68	3	Portugal U21
23	(Russia) Anton Kobyalko	2018–2020	48	19	10	7	1	0	7	4	66	30	-
24	(Ukraine) Serhiy Vakulenko	2020–2022	50	5	8	0	1	0	4	2	63	7	Ukraine U21
25	(Armenia) Albert Khachumyan	2017–2023	52	4	10	0	0	0	0	0	62	4	Armenia
26	(Armenia) Hakob Hakobyan	2022–2026	50	2	6	0	1	0	4	0	61	2	Armenia (Note: Hakobyan was born in the Georgia, but went on to represent Armenia.)
27	(Russia) Dmitry Guz	2018–2020	45	4	7	0	1	0	7	0	60	4	-
27	(Armenia) Hovhannes Harutyunyan	2017–2018, 2019–2021, 2024–2025	45	7	8	1	3	0	4	1	60	9	Armenia
29	(Armenia) Armen Nahapetyan	2017–2021	48	1	9	0	1	1	0	0	58	12	Armenia U21
30	(Ivory Coast) Kódjo	2019–2020	39	2	4	0	2	0	10	1	55	3	-
30	(Nigeria) Ogana Louis	2019–2021	39	9	5	8	9	2	2	0	55	19	-
32	(Portugal) Ângelo Meneses	2019–2021	36	1	3	1	2	0	12	0	53	2	-
33	(Armenia) Wbeymar	2021–2024	44	1	7	0	0	0	1	0	52	1	Armenia (Note: Wbeymar was born in the Colombia, but went on to represent Armenia.)
33	(Portugal) Hugo Oliveira	2025–Present	33	6	3	0	1	0	15	1	52	7	-
35	(Armenia) Gor Malakyan	2018–2020	40	0	3	0	0	0	7	0	50	0	Armenia
35	(France) Yoan Gouffran	2020–2021	40	0	5	2	1	0	4	0	50	2	France U21
35	(Russia) Vsevolod Ermakov	2022–2024	43	0	1	0	0	0	6	0	50	0	-
35	(Armenia) Petros Avetisyan	2019–2020, 2024	38	10	3	2	1	0	8	3	50	15	Armenia
39	(Bulgaria) Georgi Pashov	2018–2020	31	2	6	0	0	0	8	0	45	0	Bulgaria
39	(Haiti) Alex Junior Christian	2019–2021	34	0	6	0	2	0	3	0	45	0	Haiti
41	(Armenia) Arayik Eloyan	2022–Present	30	12	4	0	1	0	6	0	41	12	Armenia
42	(Colombia) Juan Balanta	2025–Present	29	5	1	0	0	0	11	2	41	7	-
43	(Armenia) Solomon Udo	2022–2023	37	0	1	0	0	0	2	0	40	0	Armenia (Note: Udo was born in the Nigeria, but went on to represent Armenia.)
43	(Armenia) Artur Danielyan	2018–2021	32	1	5	0	2	1	1	0	40	2	Armenia U21 (Note: Danielyan was born in Ukraine, but went on to represent Armenia U21.)
45	(North Macedonia) Aleksandar Damchevski	2018–2021	31	0	4	1	1	0	0	0	38	1	North Macedonia (Note: Damchevski was born in the France, but went on to represent North Macedonia.)
46	(Brazil) Romércio	2022–2023, 2025	32	3	2	0	0	0	2	0	36	3	-
46	(Ghana) Paul Ayongo	2025–Present	27	3	5	1	1	0	3	1	36	5	-
46	(Greece) Alexandros Malis	2025–Present	21	0	2	0	0	0	13	1	36	1	-
49	(Argentina) Alexis Rodríguez	2024–2025	28	8	3	1	0	0	4	0	35	9	-
49	(Ghana) Eric Ocansey	2024–2025	25	4	5	1	1	0	4	2	35	7	-
51	(Armenia) Armen Hovhannisyan	2017–2018, 2020–2022	29	15	5	0	-	-	-	-	34	15	Armenia U21
51	(Portugal) Adriano Castanheira	2023–2024	29	3	1	0	0	0	4	1	34	4	(Note: Castanheira was born in the Switzerland to Portuguese parents.)
51	(Guinea) Zidane Banjaqui	2026–Present	18	2	4	0	1	1	10	2	34	5	Guinea (Note: Banjaqui was born in Portugal, but went on to represent Guinea-Bissau)
54	(Armenia) Arsen Beglaryan	2023–2025	28	0	3	0	0	0	2	0	33	0	Armenia (Note: Beglaryan was born in the Russia, but went on to represent Armenia.)
55	(Cameroon) Marius Noubissi	2024–2025	26	18	5	2	1	2	0	0	32	22	Cameroon U20
56	(Russia) Aleksey Pustozyorov	2018–2019	26	0	4	0	-	-	-	-	30	0	-
56	(Italy) Valerio Vimercati	2021–2022	30	0	0	0	0	0	0	0	30	0	-
56	(Brazil) Cássio Scheid	2023–2024	23	0	3	0	0	0	4	0	30	0	-
56	(Guinea) Mohamed Yattara	2023–2024	28	18	2	0	0	0	0	0	30	18	Guinea
60	(Armenia) Mihran Petrosyan	2017–2018	27	3	2	0	-	-	-	-	29	3	-
60	(Armenia) Derenik Sargsyan	2017–2020	27	0	2	0	-	-	-	-	29	0	Armenia U19
60	(Armenia) Arman Asilyan	2017–2018	27	1	2	0	-	-	-	-	29	1	Armenia U21
60	(Armenia) Mikhail Muradyan	2017–2018	27	7	2	0	-	-	-	-	29	7	Armenia U19
60	(Colombia) Giovanny Martínez	2018–2019	25	1	4	0	0	0	0	0	29	1	-
60	(Estonia) Ilja Antonov	2019–2020	18	0	3	0	1	0	7	1	29	1	Estonia
60	(Senegal) Alioune Ndour	2026–Present	18	8	5	2	1	0	5	0	29	10	-
67	(Russia) Vladimir Khozin	2018–2019	24	3	4	1	0	0	0	0	28	4	Russia U19
68	(Armenia) Lyova Gharibyan	2017–2018	26	1	1	0	-	-	-	-	27	1	-
68	(Spain) Sergi González	2018–2019	23	0	4	0	-	-	-	-	27	0	-
68	(Serbia) Stefan Čupić	2019–2021	14	0	4	0	2	0	7	0	27	0	Serbia U23
68	(Armenia) Sargis Shahinyan	2020–2022	20	1	2	0	1	0	4	0	27	1	Armenia U21
68	(Portugal) Hugo Firmino	2022–2023	23	9	2	0	0	0	2	0	27	9	-
73	(Armenia) Davit Nalbandyan	2017–2022	24	0	2	0	-	-	-	-	26	0	Armenia U21
74	(Armenia) Erik Azizyan	2017–2018	23	4	2	0	-	-	-	-	25	4	Armenia U21
74	(Armenia) Nikolaos Melikian	2017–2019	23	0	2	0	-	-	-	-	25	0	Armenia U21 (Note: Melikian was born in the Greece, but went on to represent Armenia U21.)
74	(Morocco) Rochdi Achenteh	2019–2020	14	0	3	0	0	0	8	0	25	0	Morocco (Note: Achenteh was born in the Netherlands, but went on to represent Morocco.)
74	(Ukraine) Yehor Klymenchuk	2021–2022	23	0	2	0	0	0	0	0	25	0	-
74	(Brazil) França	2026–Present	12	3	1	1	0	0	12	2	25	6	-

=== 1–24 appearances ===
	Name	Years	League apps	League goals	Cup apps	Cup goals	Super Cup apps	Super Cup goals	Europe apps	Europe goals	Total apps	Total goals	International Career
79	(Brazil) Leonardo da Silva	2023–2024	23	1	1	0	0	0	0	0	24	1	-
79	(Portugal) Bruno Pinto	2025-2026	19	0	0	0	1	0	4	0	24	0	-
79	(Brazil) Welton	2025-2026	18	0	4	1	0	0	2	0	24	1	-
82	(Armenia) Vigen Karapetyan	2017–2018	22	1	1	0	-	-	-	-	23	1	Armenia U19
83	(Armenia) Michel Ayvazyan	2023–Present	18	1	1	0	0	0	3	0	22	1	Armenia U19
84	(Armenia) Gevorg Ghazaryan	2022–2023	21	2	0	0	0	0	0	0	21	2	Armenia
84	(Russia) Nikolai Kipiani	2023–2024	20	1	1	0	0	0	0	0	21	1	Russia U19 (Note: Kipiani was born in the Georgia, but went on to represent Russia U19.)
84	(Armenia) Arman Nersesyan	2019–Present	15	0	5	0	0	0	1	0	21	0	-
87	(Spain) David Bollo	2020–2021	15	2	1	0	3	0	1	0	20	2	-
87	(France) Maxence Carlier	2026–Present	10	0	1	1	0	0	9	0	20	1	-
87	(Brazil) Sandro Lima	2026–Present	7	3	1	0	0	0	12	4	20	7	-
90	(Armenia) Aram Kolozyan	2017–2018	18	2	0	0	-	-	-	-	18	2	Armenia U19
90	(Bulgaria) Ivaylo Dimitrov	2018–2019	17	10	1	0	0	0	0	0	18	10	Bulgaria
90	(Brazil) Kayron	2018	14	1	4	2	0	0	0	0	18	3	-
90	(Peru) Jeisson Martínez	2020–2021	13	2	2	0	0	0	3	1	18	3	-
90	(Mozambique) Bruno Wilson	2026–Present	6	0	0	0	0	0	12	2	18	2	Mozambique (Note: Wilson was born in the Portugal, but went on to represent Mozambique.)
95	(Armenia) Arsen Sargsyan	2017–2018	15	1	2	0	-	-	-	-	17	1	Armenia U19
95	(Armenia) Arman Hovhannisyan	2018–2019, 2022–2023	14	0	3	0	0	0	0	0	17	0	Armenia
95	(Nigeria) Jesse Akila	2022–2023	16	1	1	0	0	0	0	0	17	1	-
95	(Brazil) João Bravim	2026–Present	5	0	0	0	0	0	12	0	17	0	-
95	(Portugal) Benny	2026–Present	9	1	1	1	0	0	7	0	17	2	-
100	(Moldova) Dan Spătaru	2021	12	0	4	0	0	0	0	0	16	0	Moldova
100	(Armenia) Aleksandr Karapetyan	2021	12	4	4	0	0	0	0	0	16	4	Armenia (Note: Karapetyan was born in the Georgian SSR, but went on to represent Armenia.)
100	(Colombia) Carlos Pérez	2023	16	1	0	0	0	0	0	0	16	1	-
100	(Armenia) Henri Avagyan	2025	10	0	5	0	1	0	0	0	16	0	Armenia
104	(Brazil) Agdon Menezes	2022–2024	11	3	2	1	0	0	2	0	15	4	-
104	(Nigeria) Taofiq Jibril	2023	15	4	0	0	0	0	0	0	15	4	-
104	(Ukraine) Danylo Kucher	2024–2025	13	0	0	0	0	0	2	0	15	0	Ukraine U20
104	(Brazil) Luis Felipe	2026–Present	10	0	1	0	0	0	4	0	15	0	-
108	(Armenia) Hrachya Geghamyan	2017–2018	12	0	2	0	-	-	-	-	14	0	Armenia U21
108	(Belarus) Aleksandr Pavlovets	2024–2025	13	0	1	0	0	0	0	0	14	0	Belarus
110	(Armenia) Samvel Spertsyan	2017–2018	11	2	2	0	-	-	-	-	13	2	Armenia U19
110	(Armenia) Norayr Grigoryan	2017–2018	13	1	0	0	-	-	-	-	13	1	-
110	(Portugal) Bruno Pereira	2026–Present	10	0	1	0	0	0	2	0	13	0	-
113	(Armenia) Gevorg Markosyan	2017–2018	10	0	2	0	-	-	-	-	12	0	-
113	(Armenia) Karen Hovhannisyan	2017–2020	11	0	1	0	-	-	-	-	12	0	Armenia U17
113	(Russia) Vladislav Oslonovsky	2018	10	1	2	0	0	0	0	0	12	1	Russia U15
113	(Armenia) Narek Alaverdyan	2019–Present	11	0	1	0	0	0	0	0	12	0	Armenia U21
117	(Colombia) Charles Monsalvo	2018	9	1	2	2	0	0	0	0	11	3	-
117	(Brazil) João Lima	2025-2026	7	1	0	0	0	0	4	0	11	1	-
119	(Armenia) Narek Voskanyan	2017–2019	10	0	0	0	-	-	-	-	10	0	Armenia U21
119	(Nigeria) Hilary Gong	2023	10	0	0	0	0	0	0	0	10	0	-
119	(Armenia) Styopa Mkrtchyan	2020–2024	8	0	0	2	0	0	0	0	10	0	Armenia
122	(Croatia) Dragan Lovrić	2023	9	0	0	0	0	0	0	0	9	0	Croatia U20
122	(North Macedonia) Damjan Shishkovski	2024	8	0	1	0	0	0	0	0	9	0	North Macedonia
122	(Portugal) Rodrigo Ramos	2025	9	0	0	0	0	0	0	0	9	0	-
125	(Australia) Liam Rose	2018–2019	6	0	2	0	0	0	0	0	8	0	Australia U20
126	(Ivory Coast) Jean-Jacques Bougouhi	2018–2020	7	3	0	0	0	0	0	0	7	3	-
126	(Democratic Republic of the Congo) Heradi Rashidi	2021	6	0	1	0	0	0	0	0	7	0	-
128	(Belgium) Thibaut Lesquoy	2023	6	0	0	0	0	0	0	0	6	0	-
129	(Armenia) Patvakan Avetisyan	2017–2022, 2023	5	0	0	0	-	-	-	-	5	0	Armenia U19
129	(Armenia) Rafik Melikyan	2017	5	0	0	0	-	-	-	-	5	0	Armenia U19
129	(Uruguay) Diego Barboza	2021–2022	4	0	1	0	0	0	0	0	5	0	-
129	(Serbia) Miloš Stamenković	2022–2023	4	0	1	0	0	0	0	0	5	0	-
129	(Armenia) Misak Hakobyan	2021-2026	1	0	0	0	0	0	4	0	5	0	Armenia U21
129	(Morocco) Bouchaib Arrassi	2026	3	0	1	0	1	0	0	0	5	0	Morocco A'
135	(Armenia) Robert Darbinyan	2018–2019	2	0	2	0	-	-	-	-	4	0	Armenia (Note: Darbinyan was born in Russia, but went on to represent Armenia.)
135	(Serbia) Nikola Petrić	2021	4	0	0	0	0	0	0	0	4	0	-
135	(Russia) Arsen Siukayev	2018–2019	2	0	2	0	0	0	0	0	4	0	-
135	(Armenia) Vahram Makhsudyan	2020–Present	3	0	1	0	0	0	0	0	4	0	Armenia U19
139	(Armenia) Levon Gevorgyan	2018	3	0	0	0	-	-	-	-	3	0	Armenia U19
139	(Russia) David Davidyan	2018–2019	3	0	0	0	-	-	-	-	3	0	Armenia (Note: Davidyan was born in Russia, but went on to represent Armenia after leaving Ararat-Armenia)
139	(Armenia) Hrayr Mkoyan	2018	3	1	0	0	0	0	0	0	3	1	Armenia
142	(Armenia) Gevorg Mkhitaryan	2017–2018	2	0	0	0	-	-	-	-	2	0	-
142	(Armenia) Vardan Bakalyan	2018–2019	0	0	2	0	0	0	0	0	2	0	Armenia U21
142	(Russia) Danila Yashchuk	2018	2	0	0	0	0	0	0	0	2	0	Russia U21
145	(Armenia) Arman Badalyan	2017–2018	1	0	0	0	-	-	-	-	1	0	-
145	(Armenia) Samvel Harutyunyan	2017–2018	1	0	0	0	-	-	-	-	1	0	-
145	(Armenia) Vahe Muradyan	2017–2018, 2022	1	0	0	0	-	-	-	-	1	0	Armenia U21
145	(Armenia) Harutyun Vardanyan	2017–2018	1	0	0	0	-	-	-	-	1	0	-
145	(Colombia) Jerry Ortiz	2018–2019	1	0	0	0	0	0	0	0	1	0	-
145	(Armenia) Erik Smbatyan	2020–2024	1	0	0	0	0	0	0	0	1	0	Armenia U19
145	(Armenia) Vahe Petrosyan	2023–Present	1	0	0	0	0	0	0	0	1	0	-
145	(Armenia) Martun Hovhannisyan	2026–Present	1	0	0	0	0	0	0	0	1	0	-

=== International tournament representation ===
==== CAF Africa Cup of Nations ====
The following were part of African Cup of Nations squads while playing for Ararat-Armenia.

Tournament	Players
2021 Africa Cup of Nations	(Burkina Faso) Zakaria Sanogo

==== CONCACAF Gold Cup ====
The following were part of Gold Cup squads while playing for Ararat-Armenia.

Tournament	Players
2019 Gold Cup	(Haiti) Alex Junior Christian

== Team ==
=== Record wins ===
- Record win: 11–2

v Sevan, 2019–20 Armenian Cup, 27 November 2019.

- Record League win: 8–0

v Erebuni, 2017–18 Armenian First League, 12 March 2018.

- Record Armenian Cup win: 11–2

v Sevan, 2019–20 Armenian Cup, 27 November 2019.

- Record home win: 8–0

v Erebuni, 2017–18 Armenian First League, 12 March 2018.

- Record away win: 11–2

v Sevan, 2019–20 Armenian Cup, 27 November 2019.

=== Record defeats ===
- Record defeat: 0–4

v Gandzasar Kapan, 2017–18 Armenian Cup Quarter-Final 2nd leg, 11 October 2017.

- Record League defeat: 1–5

v Lori, 2017–18 Armenian First League, 3 September 2017.

- Record Armenian Cup defeat: 0–4

v Gandzasar Kapan, 2017–18 Armenian Cup Quarter-Final 2nd leg, 11 October 2017.

- Record European defeat: 1–3

v AIK, 2019–20 UEFA Champions League First qualifying round 2nd leg, 17 July 2019.

- Record home defeat: 0–4

v Gandzasar Kapan, 2017–18 Armenian Cup Quarter-Final 2nd leg, 11 October 2017.

- Record away defeat: 0–3

v Gandzasar Kapan, 2017–18 Armenian Cup Quarter-Final 1st leg, 13 September 2017.

=== Wins/draws/losses in a season ===
- Most wins in a league season: 18 – 2018–19
- Most draws in a league season: 7 – 2018–19, 2019–20
- Most defeats in a league season: 9 – 2017–18
- Fewest wins in a league season: 14 – 2017–18
- Fewest draws in a league season: 4 – 2017–18
- Fewest defeats in a league season: 6 – 2019–20

=== Goals ===
- Most League goals scored in a season: 85 – 2019–20
- Most League goals scored in a season: 65 – 2017–18
- Fewest League goals scored in a season: 45 – 2019–20
- Most League goals conceded in a season: 41 – 2017–18
- Fewest League goals conceded in a season: 23 – 2019–20

==== List of hat-tricks ====
The Result column shows the Ararat-Armenia score first.

As of match played 25 April 2026

Key
(X)	Number of times player scored a hat-trick (only for players with multiple hat-tricks)
4	Player scored four goals
5	Player scored five goals
6	Player scored six goals
	Ararat-Armenia lost the match
	Ararat-Armenia drew the match

#	Player	G	Against	Res.	Date	Competition	Home/Away/Neutral	Ref.
1	(Armenia) Mikhail Muradyan	3	Erebuni	8–0	12 March 2018	First League	Home	
2	(Armenia) Armen Hovhannisyan	3	Banants-2	7–1	21 May 2018	First League	Home	
3	(Bulgaria) Ivaylo Dimitrov	3	Artsakh	3–1	24 November 2018	Premier League	Home	
4	(Nigeria) Ogana Louis	4	Sevan	11–2	27 November 2019	Armenian Cup	Away	
5	(Armenia) Artyom Avanesyan	3	Sevan	11–2	27 November 2019	Armenian Cup	Away	
6	(Ivory Coast) Wilfried Eza	3	Ararat Yerevan	4–0	4 October 2022	Armenian Cup	Away	
7	(Guinea) Mohamed Yattara	3	Shirak	3–1	19 September 2023	Premier League	Away	
8	(Cameroon) Marius Noubissi	3	Ararat Yerevan	3–2	18 October 2024	Premier League	Home	
9	(Cameroon) Marius Noubissi (2)	3	Urartu	3–0	5 April 2025	Premier League	Away	
10	(Cameroon) Marius Noubissi (3)	3	Ararat Yerevan	6–0	28 May 2025	Premier League	Home	
11	(Armenia) Artur Serobyan	3	Ararat Yerevan	4–0	25 April 2026	Premier League	Home	

=== Points ===
- Most points in a season:

76 in 36 matches, 2022–23 Armenian Premier League

- Fewest points in a season:

38 in 24 matches, 2020–21 Armenian First League
