= 2018–19 FC Ararat-Armenia season =

Ararat-Armenia
2018–19 season
- Director: Poghos Galstyan
- Manager: Vadim Skripchenko (2 August - 25 September); Artak Oseyan (Caretaker) (25 September - 1 October); Vardan Minasyan (from 1 October)
- Stadium: Republican Stadium; FFA Academy Stadium
- Premier League: 1st
- Armenian Cup: Semifinal vs Alashkert
- Top goalscorer: League: Anton Kobyalko (15); All: Anton Kobyalko (21)
Home colours	Away colours

The 2018–19 season was FC Ararat-Armenia's 1st season in Armenian Premier League, in which they won their first Championship and reached the Semifinal of the Armenian Cup.

== Season events ==
On 2 August 2018, Vadim Skripchenko was appointed as the new head coach of Ararat-Armenia, before being sacked on 25 September, and Ararat-Armenia-2 manager Artak Oseyan being appointed as caretaker manager.

On 10 August, Ararat-Armenia sold both Erik Azizyan and Armen Hovhannisyan to Zemplín Michalovce.

On 1 October, Vardan Minasyan was appointed as the new head coach of Ararat-Armenia.

== Squad ==
As of match played 30 May 2019

Number	Name	Nationality	Position	Date of birth (age)	Signed from	Signed in	Contract ends	Apps.	Goals
Goalkeepers
12	Nikos Melikyan	(Armenia)	GK	2 March 1999 (aged 20)	Atromitos	2017		25	0
33	Dmitry Abakumov	(Russia)	GK	8 July 1989 (aged 29)	Luch Vladivostok	2018		31	0
44	Stefan Čupić	(Serbia)	GK	7 May 1994 (aged 25)	Voždovac	2019		4	0
Defenders
2	Sergi	(Spain)	DF	26 May 1995 (aged 24)	Atlético Madrid	2018		27	0
6	Georgi Pashov	(Bulgaria)	DF	4 March 1990 (aged 29)	Etar	2018		29	2
15	Dmitry Guz	(Russia)	DF	15 May 1988 (aged 31)	Tyumen	2018		29	1
21	Aleksandar Damčevski	(North Macedonia)	DF	21 November 1992 (aged 26)	Ermis Aradippou	2018		20	0
22	Artur Danielyan	(Armenia)	DF	9 February 1998 (aged 21)	Stal Kamianske	2019		12	1
24	Albert Khachumyan	(Armenia)	DF	23 June 1999 (aged 19)	Pyunik	2017		28	4
29	Vladimir Khozin	(Russia)	DF	3 July 1989 (aged 29)	loan from Ural Yekaterinburg	2018		28	4
93	Alex Junior Christian	(Haiti)	DF	5 December 1993 (aged 25)	Gandzasar Kapan	2019		13	0
Midfielders
4	Aleksey Pustozyorov	(Russia)	MF	21 September 1988 (aged 30)	Volgar Astrakhan	2018		30	0
7	Armen Nahapetyan	(Armenia)	MF	24 July 1999 (aged 19)	Pyunik	2017		43	11
8	Gor Malakyan	(Armenia)	MF	12 June 1994 (aged 24)	Stal Kamianske	2018		22	0
10	Armen Ambartsumyan	(Russia)	MF	11 April 1994 (aged 25)	Fakel Voronezh	2018		29	0
11	Zhirayr Shaghoyan	(Armenia)	MF	10 April 2001 (aged 18)	Youth team	2017		34	8
17	Giovanny Martínez	(Colombia)	MF	7 July 1989 (aged 29)	Deportivo Pasto	2018		28	1
25	Davit Nalbandyan	(Armenia)	MF	9 August 1999 (aged 19)	Youth team	2017		26	0
63	Kódjo	(Ivory Coast)	MF	28 May 1993 (aged 26)	Feirense	2019		16	1
77	Petros Avetisyan	(Armenia)	MF	7 January 1996 (aged 23)	Pyunik	2019		16	6
94	Mailson Lima	(Cape Verde)	MF	29 May 1994 (aged 25)	Viitorul Constanța	2019		17	1
Forwards
9	Jean-Jacques Bougouhi	(Ivory Coast)	FW	12 June 1992 (aged 26)	Shirak	2019		7	3
18	Artyom Avanesyan	(Russia)	FW	17 July 1999 (aged 19)	Ararat Moscow	2018		14	0
19	Narek Alaverdyan	(Armenia)	FW	19 February 2002 (aged 17)	Youth Team	2019		2	0
32	Anton Kobyalko	(Russia)	FW	14 May 1986 (aged 33)	Baltika Kaliningrad	2018		32	21
97	David Davidyan	(Russia)	FW	14 December 1997 (aged 21)	Ararat Moscow	2019		3	0
99	Ogana Louis	(Nigeria)	FW	29 December 1995 (aged 23)	Žalgiris	2019		11	4
Away on loan
14	Ivaylo Dimitrov	(Bulgaria)	FW	26 March 1989 (aged 30)	Slavia Sofia	2018		18	10
Left during the season
5	Robert Darbinyan	(Armenia)	DF	4 October 1995 (aged 23)	Shirak	2018		4	0
7	Jerry Ortiz	(Colombia)	MF	7 November 1992 (aged 26)	Penn	2018		2	0
9	Kayron	(Brazil)	FW	3 April 1995 (aged 24)	Barra	2018		18	3
13	Danila Yashchuk	(Russia)	MF	13 March 1995 (aged 24)	Volgar Astrakhan	2018		2	0
16	Liam Rose	(Australia)	MF	7 April 1997 (aged 22)	Central Coast Mariners Academy	2018		8	0
19	Arman Hovhannisyan	(Armenia)	DF	7 July 1993 (aged 25)	Zirka Kropyvnytskyi	2018		10	0
20	Hrayr Mkoyan	(Armenia)	DF	2 September 1986 (aged 32)	Shirak	2018		3	1
23	Charles Monsalvo	(Colombia)	FW	26 May 1990 (aged 29)	Sport Huancayo	2018		11	3
24	Arsen Siukayev	(Russia)	GK	7 March 1996 (aged 23)	Biolog-Novokubansk	2018		4	0
71	Samvel Spertsyan	(Armenia)	MF	24 May 1998 (aged 21)	Pyunik	2018		13	2
77	Vladislav Oslonovsky	(Russia)	MF	15 January 1995 (aged 24)	Chayka Peschanokopskoye	2018		12	1
88	Vardan Bakalyan	(Armenia)	FW	4 April 1995 (aged 24)	Shirak	2018		2	0

=== Out on loan ===
Note: Flags indicate national team as defined under FIFA eligibility rules; some limited exceptions apply. Players may hold more than one non-FIFA nationality.

No.	Pos.	Nation	Player
14	FW	BUL	Ivaylo Dimitrov (at Zhetysu)

== Transfers ==
=== In ===
Date	Position	Nationality	Name	From	Fee	Ref.
Summer 2018	GK	(Russia)	Dmitry Abakumov	Luch Vladivostok	Undisclosed	
Summer 2018	GK	(Russia)	Arsen Siukayev	Biolog-Novokubansk	Undisclosed	
Summer 2018	DF	(Armenia)	Artur Danielyan	Stal Kamianske	Undisclosed	
Summer 2018	DF	(Armenia)	Robert Darbinyan	Shirak	Undisclosed	
Summer 2018	DF	(Armenia)	Arman Hovhannisyan	Zirka Kropyvnytskyi	Undisclosed	
Summer 2018	DF	(Armenia)	Hrayr Mkoyan	Shirak	Undisclosed	
Summer 2018	DF	(Russia)	Dmitry Guz	Tyumen	Undisclosed	
Summer 2018	MF	(Russia)	Armen Ambartsumyan	Fakel Voronezh	Undisclosed	
Summer 2018	MF	(Armenia)	Gor Malakyan	Stal Kamianske	Undisclosed	
Summer 2018	MF	(Australia)	Liam Rose	Central Coast Mariners	Undisclosed	
Summer 2018	MF	(Bulgaria)	Georgi Pashov	Etar Veliko Tarnovo	Undisclosed	
Summer 2018	MF	(Russia)	Vladislav Oslonovskiy	Chayka Peschanokopskoye	Undisclosed	
Summer 2018	MF	(Russia)	Aleksey Pustozyorov	Volgar Astrakhan	Undisclosed	
Summer 2018	MF	(Russia)	Danila Yashchuk	Volgar Astrakhan	Undisclosed	
Summer 2018	FW	(Brazil)	Kayron	Barra	Undisclosed	
Summer 2018	FW	(Bulgaria)	Ivaylo Dimitrov	Slavia Sofia	Undisclosed	
Summer 2018	FW	(Colombia)	Charles Monsalvo	Rionegro Águilas	Undisclosed	
Summer 2018	FW	(Russia)	Artyom Avanesyan	Ararat Moscow	Undisclosed	
Summer 2018	FW	(Russia)	Anton Kobyalko	Baltika Kaliningrad	Undisclosed	
18 August 2018	MF	(Colombia)	Giovanny Martínez	Deportivo Pasto	Undisclosed	
19 August 2018	DF	(North Macedonia)	Aleksandar Damčevski	Ermis Aradippou	Undisclosed	
24 August 2018	DF	(Spain)	Sergi	Atlético Madrid	Undisclosed	
11 January 2019	GK	(Serbia)	Stefan Čupić	Voždovac	Undisclosed	
11 January 2019	DF	(Haiti)	Alex Junior	Gandzasar Kapan	Undisclosed	
17 January 2019	FW	(Ivory Coast)	Jean-Jacques Bougouhi	Shirak	Undisclosed	
25 February 2019	MF	(Ivory Coast)	Kódjo	Feirense	Undisclosed	
26 February 2019	MF	(Cape Verde)	Mailson Lima	Viitorul Constanța	Undisclosed	
26 February 2019	MF	(Armenia)	Petros Avetisyan	Pyunik	Undisclosed	
28 February 2019	FW	(Nigeria)	Ogana Louis	Žalgiris	Free	

=== Loans in ===
Date from	Position	Nationality	Name	From	Date to	Ref.
29 August 2018	DF	(Russia)	Vladimir Khozin	Ural Yekaterinburg	End of Season	

=== Out ===
Date	Position	Nationality	Name	To	Fee	Ref.
10 August 2018	MF	(Armenia)	Erik Azizyan	Zemplín Michalovce	Undisclosed	
10 August 2018	FW	(Armenia)	Armen Hovhannisyan	Zemplín Michalovce	Undisclosed	
24 August 2018	DF	(Armenia)	Hrayr Mkoyan	Alashkert	Undisclosed	

=== Loans out ===
Date from	Position	Nationality	Name	To	Date to	Ref.
22 February 2019	FW	(Bulgaria)	Ivaylo Dimitrov	Zhetysu		

=== Released ===
Date	Position	Nationality	Name	Joined	Date	Ref
14 December 2018	FW	(Armenia)	Vardan Bakalyan	Artsakh		
19 December 2018	MF	(Australia)	Liam Rose	Sydney United	February 2019	
22 December 2018	FW	(Colombia)	Charles Monsalvo	Al Kharaitiyat		
22 December 2018	FW	(Brazil)	Kayron	Hercílio Luz		
31 December 2018	MF	(Armenia)	Samvel Spertsyan			
7 January 2019	GK	(Russia)	Arsen Siukayev	Lori	11 January 2019	
9 January 2019	MF	(Colombia)	Jerry Ortiz	Tauro		
11 January 2019	DF	(Armenia)	Arman Hovhannisyan	Gandzasar Kapan		
13 January 2019	MF	(Russia)	Danila Yashchuk	AC Kajaani		
13 January 2019	FW	(Russia)	Vladislav Oslonovsky	Tyumen		
14 January 2019	DF	(Armenia)	Robert Darbinyan	Banants	16 January 2019	

== Competitions ==
=== Overall record ===
Competition	First match	Last match	Starting round	Final position	Record							
Competition	First match	Last match	Starting round	Final position	Pld	W	D	L	GF	GA	GD	Win %
Premier League	4 August 2018	30 May 2019	Matchday 1	Winners	32	18	7	7	53	28	+25	56.25
Armenian Cup	20 September 2018	22 April 2019	First round	Semifinal	6	3	3	0	13	4	+9	50.00
Total					38	21	10	7	66	32	+34	55.26

Last updated: 30 May 2019
Source: Competitions

=== Premier League ===
==== Results summary ====
Overall								Home						Away					
Pld	W	D	L	GF	GA	GD	Pts	W	D	L	GF	GA	GD	W	D	L	GF	GA	GD
32	18	7	7	53	28	+25	61	7	5	4	25	17	+8	11	2	3	28	11	+17

Last updated: 30 May 2019.
Source: See Results

==== Results ====
4 August 2018 1	Lori	0 – 2	Ararat-Armenia	Vanadzor
17:00 (UTC+4)	U.Iwu (yellow card) 64'	Report	Dimitrov 67'; Guz (yellow card) 71'; Kobyalko (yellow card) 84'; Mkoyan 86' (pen.)	Stadium: Vanadzor Football Academy; Attendance: 500; Referee: Suren Baliyan

11 August 2018 2	Ararat-Armenia	1 – 2	Ararat Yerevan	Yerevan
19:00 (UTC+4)	Dimitrov 21'; Pustozerov (yellow card) 37'	Report	Badoyan 16'; Mkoyan 46' (o.g.); Abidinov (yellow card) 71'	Stadium: Republican Stadium; Attendance: 300; Referee: Artur Simonyan

19 August 2018 3	Pyunik	3 – 1	Ararat-Armenia	Yerevan
21:30 (UTC+4)	R.Minasyan (red card) 38'; H.Ilangyozyan 45'; Stezhko 58'; Konaté 85'; Kobozev (yellow card) 90'	Report	Dimitrov 39' (pen.); Mkoyan (yellow card) 77'; Ambartsumyan (yellow card) 87'; Malakyan (yellow card) 90+1'	Stadium: Republican Stadium; Attendance: 300; Referee: Zaven Hovhannisyan

22 August 2018 4	Ararat-Armenia	0 – 0	Gandzasar Kapan	Yerevan
19:00 (UTC+4)	Pashov (yellow card) 24'; Hovhannisyan (yellow card) 75'	Report	Wbeymar (yellow card) 49'; V.Pogosyan (yellow card) 56'	Stadium: Republican Stadium; Attendance: 500; Referee: Suren Baliyan

26 August 2018 5	Alashkert	1 – 3	Ararat-Armenia	Yerevan
16:00 (UTC+4)	Manucharyan 4' (pen.); Grigoryan (yellow card) 53'; Stojković (yellow card) 88'	Report	Dimitrov 6' (pen.); Khozin 14' (yellow card) 78'; Kobyalko 37'; Damčevski (yellow card) 47'; Abakumov (yellow card) 62'; Hovhannisyan (yellow card) 70'	Stadium: Alashkert Stadium; Attendance: 300; Referee: Artur Simonyan

1 September 2018 6	Ararat-Armenia	3 – 1	Shirak	Yerevan
19:00 (UTC+4)	A.Davoyan 2' (o.g.); Pustozyorov (yellow card) 29'; Dimitrov 53', 66'; Martínez (yellow card) 75'	Report	A.Muradyan 15'; Z.Margaryan (yellow card) 21'; Shabani (yellow card) 75'; M.Diakité (yellow card) 84'; Arreola (yellow card) 90+2'	Stadium: FFA Academy Stadium; Attendance: 600; Referee: Artur Simonyan

15 September 2018 7	Artsakh	1 – 1	Ararat-Armenia	Yerevan
14:00 (UTC+4)	H.Poghosyan 68'; O.Tupchiyenko (yellow card) 74'	Report	Dimitrov 44'; Guz (yellow card) 62'; Kayron (yellow card) 77'	Stadium: Mika Stadium; Attendance: 400; Referee: Henrik Nalbandyan

23 September 2018 8	Ararat-Armenia	1 – 3	Banants	Yerevan
17:00 (UTC+4)	Darbinyan (yellow card) 27'; Monsalvo 84'; Malakyan (yellow card) 87'; Rose (yellow card) 89'	Report	V.Ayvazyan 9' (yellow card) 85'; Gultyayev (yellow card) 29'; Stanojević 32' (yellow card) 85'; E.Petrosyan 90+3'; A.Bareghamyan (yellow card) 90+5'	Stadium: FFA Academy Stadium; Attendance: 500; Referee: Artur Safaryan

29 September 2018 9	Ararat-Armenia	0 – 0	Lori	Yerevan
18:00 (UTC+4)	Pashov (yellow card) 64'; Hovhannisyan (yellow card) 83'; Ambartsumyan (yellow card) 90+2'	Report	D.Dosa (yellow card) 11'	Stadium: FFA Academy Stadium; Attendance: 1,000; Referee: Suren Baliyan

7 October 2018 10	Ararat Yerevan	0 – 1	Ararat-Armenia	Yerevan
15:00 (UTC+4)		Report	Oslonovsky 42'; Malakyan (yellow card) 47'	Stadium: Alashkert Stadium; Attendance: 500; Referee: Suren Baliyan

21 October 2018 11	Ararat-Armenia	0 – 0	Pyunik	Yerevan
18:00 (UTC+4)	Pashov (yellow card) 24'; Pustozyorov (yellow card) 62'	Report	Dorozhkin (yellow card) 5'; A.Kartashyan (yellow card) 78'; Stezhko (yellow card) 90+2'	Stadium: FFA Academy Stadium; Attendance: 500; Referee: Artur Simonyan

27 October 2018 12	Gandzasar Kapan	0 – 0	Ararat-Armenia	Yerevan
18:00 (UTC+4)	D.Terteryan (yellow card) 60'; Aslanyan (yellow card) 90+1'	Report	Malakyan (yellow card) 15'; Khozin (yellow card) 79'	Stadium: FFA Academy Stadium; Attendance: 150; Referee: Zaven Hovhannisyan

31 October 2018 13	Ararat-Armenia	0 – 1	Alashkert	Yerevan
19:00 (UTC+4)	Khozin (yellow card) 90+4'	Report	T.Voskanyan (yellow card) 31'; Pashov 54' (o.g.); Jefferson (yellow card) 87' (red card) 87'	Stadium: Republican Stadium; Attendance: 400; Referee: Suren Baliyan

11 November 2018 14	Shirak	1 – 0	Ararat-Armenia	Gyumri
14:00 (UTC+4)	A.Muradyan (yellow card) 52'; A.Davoyan (yellow card) 55'; Kabangu 78' (yellow card) 78'	Report	Khozin (yellow card) 25'; Martínez (yellow card) 74'	Stadium: Gyumri City Stadium; Attendance: 800; Referee: Suren Baliyan

24 November 2018 15	Ararat-Armenia	3 – 1	Artsakh	Yerevan
15:00 (UTC+4)	Dimitrov 1', 17', 40'; Monsalvo (yellow card) 53'; Martínez (yellow card) 57'	Report	A.Bakhtiyarov 23'; Minasyan (yellow card) 55'; H.Poghosyan (yellow card) 58'	Stadium: Republican Stadium; Attendance: 70; Referee: Artur Safaryan

28 November 2018 16	Banants	0 – 3	Ararat-Armenia	Yerevan
14:00 (UTC+4)	Jovanović (yellow card) 32'	Report	Kobyalko 25'; Khozin 33'; Kayron 90'	Stadium: Banants-4 Stadium; Attendance: 170; Referee: Zaven Hovhannisyan

1 December 2018 17	Lori	0 – 1	Ararat-Armenia	Vanadzor
14:00 (UTC+4)	D.Dosa (yellow card) 74'; A.Mensah (yellow card) 87'	Report	Kobyalko 49' (yellow card) 52'; Shaghoyan (yellow card) 88'	Stadium: Vanadzor Football Academy; Attendance: 300; Referee: Artur Simonyan

2 March 2019 18	Ararat-Armenia	4 – 1	Ararat Yerevan	Yerevan
14:00 (UTC+4)	Bougouhi 11', 51'; Khozin (yellow card) 27'; Pashov (yellow card) 49'; Kódjo (yellow card) 69'; Kobyalko 84'; Avetisyan 90'	Report	Kaluhin (yellow card) 4'; Simonyan 62' (pen.)	Stadium: FFA Academy Stadium; Attendance: 300; Referee: Zaven Hovhannisyan

6 March 2019 19	Pyunik	0 – 3	Ararat-Armenia	Yerevan
14:00 (UTC+4)	Stezhko (yellow card) 31'; Marku (yellow card) 71'; Zhestokov (yellow card) 79'	Report	Pashov 12'; Martínez 26'; Kobyalko 65'	Stadium: Pyunik Training Centre; Attendance: 300

9 March 2019 20	Ararat-Armenia	2 – 0	Gandzasar Kapan	Yerevan
15:00 (UTC+4)	Bougouhi 7' (pen.); Kódjo (yellow card) 17'; Avanesyan (yellow card) 38'; Ambartsumyan (yellow card) 40'; Pashov (yellow card) 41'; Khozin (yellow card) 75'; Kobyalko 79'	Report	G.Nranyan (yellow card) 49'; A.Magallanes (yellow card) 58'; Baldé (red card) 85'	Stadium: FFA Academy Stadium; Attendance: 300; Referee: Suren Baliyan

17 March 2019 21	Alashkert	0 – 1	Ararat-Armenia	Yerevan
14:00 (UTC+4)	Prudnikov (yellow card) 64'; T.Voskanyan (yellow card) 90+3'	Report	Kódjo (yellow card) 34'; Mailson (yellow card) 68'; Bougouhi (yellow card) 72'; Kobyalko 73'	Stadium: Alashkert Stadium; Attendance: 800; Referee: Artur Simonyan

8 April 2019 22	Ararat-Armenia	2 – 2	Shirak	Yerevan
14:00 (UTC+4)	Bougouhi (yellow card) 35'; Kódjo (yellow card) 73'; Avetisyan 80' (yellow card) 86'; Martínez (yellow card) 80'; Guz 85'; Malakyan (yellow card) 89'	Report	Shabani 70'; D.Ghandilyan 81'; R.Mkrtchyan (yellow card) 83'; A.Tsaturyan (yellow card) 86'	Stadium: FFA Academy Stadium; Attendance: 400; Referee: Gevorg Eghoyan

11 April 2019 23	Artsakh	1 – 3	Ararat-Armenia	Yerevan
15:00 (UTC+4)	A.Meliksetyan (yellow card) 30'; V.Avetisyan 39'	Report	Avetisyan 9', 19'; Čupić (yellow card) 28'; Kobyalko 66'	Stadium: Pyunik Training Centre; Attendance: 200; Referee: Artur Safaryan

15 April 2019 24	Ararat-Armenia	1 – 1	Banants	Yerevan
15:00 (UTC+4)	Malakyan (yellow card) 54'; Pashov 90+1'	Report	Gadzhibekov 45+1'; Darbinyan (yellow card) 48'; Kpodo (yellow card) 66'	Stadium: FFA Academy Stadium; Attendance: 400; Referee: Artur Simonyan

19 April 2019 25	Ararat-Armenia	3 – 0	Lori	Yerevan
16:00 (UTC+4)	Louis 5', 33'; Pustozyorov (yellow card) 36'; Guz (yellow card) 60'; Kobyalko 84'	Report		Stadium: FFA Academy Stadium; Attendance: 500; Referee: Suren Baliyan

26 April 2019 26	Ararat Yerevan	2 – 6	Ararat-Armenia	Yerevan
16:00 (UTC+4)	K.Ntika (yellow card) 53'; Simonyan 60'; Kaluhin (yellow card) 79'; Vukomanović 85'	Report	Kobyalko 14'; Khozin 19'; Pustozyorov (yellow card) 30'; Avetisyan 31', 55'; Louis (yellow card) 69'; Mailson 70'; Danielyan 90+1'	Stadium: Banants-3 Stadium; Attendance: 210; Referee: Gevorg Eghoyan

1 May 2019 27	Ararat-Armenia	1 – 4	Pyunik	Yerevan
15:00 (UTC+4)	Khozin (yellow card) 47'; Kódjo (yellow card) 49'; Kobyalko 69' (pen.); Malakyan (yellow card) 77'	Report	Usman 48'; Miranyan 50'; Vardanyan 68'; Talalay 86'	Stadium: Republican Stadium; Attendance: 300; Referee: Artur Simonyan

4 May 2019 28	Gandzasar Kapan	2 – 1	Ararat-Armenia	Yerevan
15:00 (UTC+4)	D.Minasyan 6' (yellow card) 60'; Harutyunyan 19'	Report	Louis 89'; Kódjo (yellow card) 90'	Stadium: FFA Academy Stadium; Attendance: 300; Referee: Suren Baliyan

12 May 2019 29	Ararat-Armenia	2 – 1	Alashkert	Yerevan
17:00 (UTC+4)	Danielyan (yellow card) 32'; Guz (yellow card) 75'; Louis 78'; Kobyalko 88' (pen.); Sergi (yellow card) 90+3'	Report	Manucharyan (yellow card) 44'; Prudnikov 45+2'; Stojković (red card) 88'	Stadium: FFA Academy Stadium; Attendance: 500; Referee: Gevorg Eghoyan

19 May 2019 30	Shirak	0 – 1	Ararat-Armenia	Gyumri
15:00 (UTC+4)	R.Mkrtchyan (yellow card) 90+4'	Report	Kódjo 8'	Stadium: Gyumri City Stadium; Attendance: 200; Referee: Zaven Hovhannisyan

24 May 2019 31	Ararat-Armenia	2 – 0	Artsakh	Yerevan
17:00 (UTC+4)	Kobyalko 7', 48' (pen.); Malakyan (yellow card) 80'; Khozin (yellow card) 88'	Report	E.Avagyan (yellow card) 17'; Hovhannisyan (yellow card) 18'; V.Movsisyan (yellow card) 36'	Stadium: FFA Academy Stadium; Attendance: 500; Referee: Xavier Estrada Fernández

30 May 2019 32	Banants	0 – 1	Ararat-Armenia	Yerevan
17:00 (UTC+4)	A.Bareghamyan (yellow card) 45+2'; Camara (yellow card) 67'; V.Ayvazyan (yellow card) 75'	Report	Kobyalko 52' (pen.); Kódjo (yellow card) 67'	Stadium: Banants Stadium; Attendance: 3,000; Referee: Krzysztof Jakubik

==== Table ====
Pos	Team	Pld	W	D	L	GF	GA	GD	Pts	Qualification or relegation
1	Ararat-Armenia (C)	32	18	7	7	53	28	+25	61	Qualification for the Champions League first qualifying round
2	Pyunik	32	18	6	8	46	32	+14	60	Qualification for the Europa League first qualifying round (Note: Alashkert qualified for the Europa League first qualifying round by winning the 2018–19 Armenian Cup.)
3	Banants	32	14	10	8	43	35	+8	52	Qualification for the Europa League first qualifying round
4	Alashkert	32	15	6	11	37	27	+10	51	Qualification for the Europa League first qualifying round
5	Lori	32	11	11	10	42	40	+2	44	
6	Gandzasar	32	10	8	14	38	33	+5	38	
7	Shirak	32	7	15	10	26	30	−4	36	
8	Artsakh	32	6	10	16	25	49	−24	28	
9	Ararat Yerevan	32	5	7	20	24	60	−36	22	

Source: Soccerway
Rules for classification: 1) Points; 2) Play-off (only if deciding champion); 3) Matches won; 4) Head-to-head points; 5) Head-to-head matches won; 6) Head-to-head goal difference; 7) Head-to-head goals scored; 8) Head-to-head away goals scored; 9) Goal difference; 10) Goals scored.
(C) Champions

=== Armenian Cup ===
20 September 2018 First Round 1st leg	Yerevan	1 – 4	Ararat-Armenia	Yerevan
16:00 (UTC+4)	Y.Yevgenyev (yellow card) 54' (yellow-red card) 78'; R.Zavialov 88'	Report	Kobyalko 22', 31', 65'; V.Bakalyan (yellow card) 68'; Kayron 85'	Stadium: FFA Academy Stadium; Attendance: 200; Referee: Gevorg Eghoyan

3 October 2018 First Round 2nd leg	Ararat-Armenia	5 – 0 (9 – 1 agg.)	Yerevan	Yerevan
16:00 (UTC+4)	Guz (yellow card) 44'; Limonov 45' (o.g.); Kobyalko 49', 77'; Kayron 57'; Shaghoyan 89'	Report	Y.Yevgenyev (yellow card) 80'	Stadium: Republican Stadium; Attendance: 70; Referee: Henrik Nalbandyan

24 October 2018 Quarterfinal 1st leg	Ararat-Armenia	1 – 1	Gandzasar Kapan	Yerevan
18:00 (UTC+4)	Monsalvo 15'; Kobyalko (yellow card) 53'; Avanesyan (yellow card) 64'	Report	Musonda (yellow card) 23'; A.Hovhannisyan (yellow card) 58'; G.Nranyan 63'	Stadium: Republican Stadium; Attendance: 100; Referee: Artur Simonyan

7 November 2018 Quarterfinal 2nd leg	Gandzasar Kapan	0 – 1 (1 – 2 agg.)	Ararat-Armenia	Yerevan
18:00 (UTC+4)	Wbeymar (yellow card) 30'; Aslanyan (yellow card) 57'	Report	Monsalvo 11'; Pashov (yellow card) 72'	Stadium: FFA Academy Stadium; Attendance: 200; Referee: Zaven Hovhannisyan

3 April 2019 Semifinal 1st leg	Ararat-Armenia	2 – 2	Alashkert	Yerevan
14:00 (UTC+4)	Mkoyan 63'; Kódjo 76' (o.g.)	Report	Kobyalko 14'; Ambartsumyan (yellow card) 72'; Christian (yellow card) 73'; Khozin 79'	Stadium: FFA Academy Stadium; Attendance: 400; Referee: Zaven Hovhannisyan

22 April 2019 Semifinal 2nd leg	Alashkert	0 – 0 (a 2 – 2 agg.)	Ararat-Armenia	Yerevan
16:00 (UTC+4)	Antonić (yellow card) 41'; Čančarević (yellow card) 85'	Report	Avetisyan (yellow card) 8'; Sergi (yellow card) 90+2'	Stadium: Republican Stadium; Attendance: 300; Referee: Artur Simonyan

== Statistics ==
As of match played 30 May 2019

=== Appearances and goals ===
No.	Pos	Nat	Player	Total		Premier League		Armenian Cup	
No.	Pos	Nat	Player	Apps	Goals	Apps	Goals	Apps	Goals
2	DF	(Spain) ESP	Sergi	27	0	21+2	0	3+1	0
4	MF	(Russia) RUS	Aleksey Pustozyorov	30	0	23+3	0	2+2	0
6	DF	(Bulgaria) BUL	Georgi Pashov	29	2	23+1	2	4+1	0
7	MF	(Armenia) ARM	Armen Nahapetyan	14	0	9+2	0	2+1	0
8	MF	(Armenia) ARM	Gor Malakyan	22	0	9+12	0	0+1	0
9	FW	(Ivory Coast) CIV	Jean-Jacques Bougouhi	7	3	7	3	0	0
10	MF	(Russia) RUS	Armen Ambartsumyan	29	0	14+9	0	5+1	0
11	FW	(Armenia) ARM	Zhirayr Shaghoyan	15	1	0+11	0	0+4	1
15	DF	(Russia) RUS	Dmitry Guz	29	1	24	1	5	0
17	MF	(Colombia) COL	Giovanny Martínez	29	1	19+6	1	4	0
18	FW	(Russia) RUS	Artyom Avanesyan	14	0	5+5	0	2+2	0
19	FW	(Armenia) ARM	Narek Alaverdyan	2	0	0+2	0	0	0
21	DF	(North Macedonia) MKD	Aleksandar Damčevski	20	0	16+3	0	1	0
22	DF	(Armenia) ARM	Artur Danielyan	12	1	9+1	1	2	0
24	DF	(Armenia) ARM	Albert Khachumyan	2	0	1	0	0+1	0
29	DF	(Russia) RUS	Vladimir Khozin	28	4	24	3	4	1
32	FW	(Russia) RUS	Anton Kobyalko	32	21	14+12	15	5+1	6
33	GK	(Russia) RUS	Dmitry Abakumov	31	0	28	0	3	0
44	GK	(Serbia) SRB	Stefan Čupić	4	0	3	0	1	0
63	MF	(Ivory Coast) CIV	Kódjo	16	1	14	1	2	0
71	MF	(Armenia) ARM	Samvel Spertsyan	2	0	0	0	0+2	0
77	MF	(Armenia) ARM	Petros Avetisyan	16	6	12+2	6	2	0
93	DF	(Haiti) HAI	Alex Junior Christian	13	0	9+2	0	1+1	0
94	MF	(Cape Verde) CPV	Mailson Lima	17	1	11+4	1	2	0
97	FW	(Russia) RUS	David Davidyan	3	0	0+3	0	0	0
99	FW	(Nigeria) NGA	Ogana Louis	11	4	3+7	4	1	0
Players away on loan:
14	FW	(Bulgaria) BUL	Ivaylo Dimitrov	18	10	16+1	10	1	0
Players who left Ararat-Armenia during the season:
5	DF	(Armenia) ARM	Robert Darbinyan	4	0	2	0	2	0
7	MF	(Colombia) COL	Jerry Ortiz	1	0	1	0	0	0
9	FW	(Brazil) BRA	Kayron	18	3	3+11	1	2+2	2
13	MF	(Russia) RUS	Danila Yashchuk	2	0	0+2	0	0	0
16	MF	(Australia) AUS	Liam Rose	8	0	4+2	0	2	0
19	DF	(Armenia) ARM	Arman Hovhannisyan	10	0	8	0	2	0
20	DF	(Armenia) ARM	Hrayr Mkoyan	3	1	3	1	0	0
23	FW	(Colombia) COL	Charles Monsalvo	11	3	9	1	2	2
24	GK	(Russia) RUS	Arsen Siukayev	4	0	1+1	0	2	0
77	MF	(Russia) RUS	Vladislav Oslonovsky	12	1	7+3	1	1+1	0
88	FW	(Armenia) ARM	Vardan Bakalyan	2	0	0	0	1+1	0

=== Goal scorers ===
Place	Position	Nation	Number	Name	Premier League	Armenian Cup	Total
1	FW	(Russia)	32	Anton Kobyalko	15	6	21
2	FW	(Bulgaria)	14	Ivaylo Dimitrov	10	0	10
3	MF	(Armenia)	77	Petros Avetisyan	6	0	6
4	FW	(Nigeria)	99	Ogana Louis	4	0	4
4	DF	(Russia)	29	Vladimir Khozin	3	1	4
6	FW	(Ivory Coast)	9	Jean-Jacques Bougouhi	3	0	3
6	FW	(Colombia)	23	Charles Monsalvo	1	2	3
6	FW	(Brazil)	9	Kayron	1	2	3
9	MF	(Bulgaria)	6	Georgi Pashov	2	0	2
9				Own goal	1	1	2
11	DF	(Armenia)	20	Hrayr Mkoyan	1	0	1
11	MF	(Russia)	77	Vladislav Oslonovsky	1	0	1
11	MF	(Colombia)	17	Giovanny Martínez	1	0	1
11	DF	(Russia)	15	Dmitry Guz	1	0	1
11	MF	(Cape Verde)	94	Mailson Lima	1	0	1
11	DF	(Russia)	22	Artur Danielyan	1	0	1
11	MF	(Nigeria)	63	Kódjo	1	0	1
11	FW	(Armenia)	11	Zhirayr Shaghoyan	0	1	1
				TOTALS	53	13	66

=== Clean sheets ===
Place	Position	Nation	Number	Name	Premier League	Armenian Cup	Total
1	GK	(Russia)	33	Dmitry Abakumov	15	2	17
2	GK	(Russia)	24	Arsen Siukayev	0	1	1
				TOTALS	15	3	18

=== Disciplinary record ===
Number	Nation	Position	Name	Premier League		Armenian Cup		Total	
Number	Nation	Position	Name	Booked	Sent off (straight red)	Booked	Sent off (straight red)	Booked	Sent off (straight red)
2	(Spain)	DF	Sergi	1	0	1	0	2	0
4	(Russia)	MF	Aleksey Pustozyorov	5	0	0	0	5	0
6	(Bulgaria)	MF	Georgi Pashov	5	0	1	0	6	0
8	(Armenia)	MF	Gor Malakyan	8	0	0	0	8	0
9	(Ivory Coast)	FW	Jean-Jacques Bougouhi	2	0	0	0	2	0
10	(Russia)	MF	Armen Ambartsumyan	3	0	1	0	4	0
11	(Armenia)	FW	Zhirayr Shaghoyan	1	0	0	0	1	0
15	(Russia)	DF	Dmitry Guz	4	0	1	0	5	0
17	(Colombia)	MF	Giovanny Martínez	4	0	0	0	4	0
18	(Russia)	FW	Artyom Avanesyan	1	0	1	0	2	0
21	(North Macedonia)	DF	Aleksandar Damčevski	1	0	0	0	1	0
22	(Armenia)	DF	Artur Danielyan	1	0	0	0	1	0
29	(Russia)	DF	Vladimir Khozin	8	0	0	0	8	0
32	(Russia)	FW	Anton Kobyalko	2	0	1	0	3	0
33	(Russia)	GK	Dmitry Abakumov	1	0	0	0	1	0
44	(Serbia)	GK	Stefan Čupić	1	0	0	0	1	0
77	(Armenia)	MF	Petros Avetisyan	1	0	1	0	2	0
63	(Ivory Coast)	MF	Kódjo	7	0	0	0	7	0
93	(Haiti)	DF	Alex Junior Christian	0	0	1	0	1	0
94	(Cape Verde)	MF	Mailson Lima	1	0	0	0	1	0
99	(Nigeria)	FW	Ogana Louis	1	0	0	0	1	0
Players who left Ararat-Armenia during the season:
5	(Armenia)	DF	Robert Darbinyan	1	0	0	0	1	0
9	(Brazil)	FW	Kayron	1	0	0	0	1	0
16	(Australia)	MF	Liam Rose	1	0	0	0	1	0
19	(Armenia)	DF	Arman Hovhannisyan	3	0	0	0	3	0
20	(Armenia)	DF	Hrayr Mkoyan	1	0	0	0	1	0
23	(Colombia)	FW	Charles Monsalvo	1	0	0	0	1	0
88	(Armenia)	FW	Vardan Bakalyan	0	0	1	0	1	0
			TOTALS	66	0	9	0	75	0
