= 2020–21 FC Pyunik season =

Pyunik
2020-21 season
- Chairman: Rafik Hayrapetyan
- Manager: Artak Oseyan (until 13 December); Yegishe Melikyan (from 7 January)
- Stadium: Republican Stadium
- Premier League: 7th
- Armenian Cup: First Round vs Urartu
- Top goalscorer: League: José Caraballo (3); All: Two Players (3)
Home colours	Away colours

The 2020–21 season was Pyunik's 27th season in the Armenian Premier League.

== Season events ==
On 20 July, Artak Oseyan was announced as Pyunik's new manager.

On 23 July, Pyunik announced the signing of Artur Grigoryan from Gandzasar Kapan, with Anton Kobyalko joining from Ararat-Armenia the following day.

On 29 July, Muhammad Ladan joined the club on loan from Sochi for the season, and Stanislav Buchnev joined from Fakel Voronezh.

On 1 August, Alexandre Yeoule signed for Pyunik after leaving Lori.

On 3 August, Pyunik announced the singing of Gor Malakyan, and a new technical partnership with Joma to supply their kit.

On 4 August, Pyunik's planned friendly match against Urartu on 6 August was cancelled.

On 5 August, Pyunik announced the signing of Artyom Avanesyan on loan from Ararat-Armenia for the season, whilst goalkeeper Andrija Dragojević left the club by mutual consent.

On 10 August, Armen Manucharyan left Pyunik to join Rotor Volgograd.

On 15 August, Pyunik announced the signing of Dramane Salou from Slutsk.

On 21 August, Pyunik announced the signing of Julius Ufuoma from Lori.

On 1 September, Pyunik announced the signings of Magomed Musalov and Artem Habelok.

On 2 September, Pyunik announced that Erik Azizyan had extended his contract until the summer of 2023, and that Levon Vardanyan had signed a new deal until the summer of 2025.

On 17 September, Pyunik announced the signing of Armen Nahapetyan on loan from Ararat-Armenia for the season.

On 29 September, the season was suspended indefinitely due to the escalating 2020 Nagorno-Karabakh conflict. On 13 October, the FFA announced that the season would resume on 17 October.

On 22 October, Pyunik's match against Noah was postponed due to positive COVID-19 cases within the Noah team.

On 2 November, Pyunik's game against Urartu was postponed due to positive COVID-19 cases within the Pyunik team.

On 9 December, Pyunik extended their contract with Serob Grigoryan.

On 13 December, Artak Oseyan left his role as Head Coach of Pyunik. On 7 January, Yegishe Melikyan was announced as Pyunik's new manager.

On 25 January, Arman Hovhannisyan returned to Pyunik. The following day, 26 January, Pyunik announced the signing of Ihor Honchar from Alashkert, and on 27 January, Anton Bratkov joined from Metalist 1925 Kharkiv, and Robert Darbinyan from Urartu.

On 29 January, Pyunik announced the signing of Mykyta Tatarkov. The following day, 30 January, Artem Habelok left Pyunik by mutual consent.

On 1 February, Pyunik announced the signing of Herman Penkov from Lviv. Two days later, 3 February, Pyunik announced the signing of Brazilian midfielder Higor from Botafogo da Paraíba.

On 4 February, Pyunik announced the signing of Hovhannes Harutyunyan on a free transfer after he'd left Ararat-Armenia.

On 5 February, Pyunik announced the signings of Rommell Ibarra and José Balza on loan from Deportivo La Guaira.

On 10 February, Pyunik announced that Arthur Nadiryan had retired from football due to injuries, with Valeriy Boldenkov signing for the club the following day.

On 12 February, Levon Vardanyan joined BKMA Yerevan on loan for the rest of the season.

On 15 February, Pyunik announced the signing of José Caraballo from Real Santa Cruz.

On 17 February, Alexandre Yeoule left Pyunik by mutual consent, and Edmon Movsisyan moved to West Armenia.

On 20 February, Pyunik announced the signing of Oleh Kozhushko, whilst Robert Hakobyan, Arsen Sargsyan and Narek Hovhannisyan all left the club by mutual consent.

On 1 March, Pyunik announced the signing of Yevhen Budnik from Urartu.

== Squad ==
As of 1 March 2021

Note: Flags indicate national team as defined under FIFA eligibility rules; some limited exceptions apply. Players may hold more than one non-FIFA nationality.

No.	Pos.	Nation	Player
1	GK	ARM	Sevak Aslanyan
2	DF	ARM	Serob Grigoryan
3	DF	ARM	Artur Kartashyan
4	DF	ARM	Perch Poghikyan
5	MF	NGR	Julius Ufuoma
6	MF	ARM	Norayr Ghazaryan
7	MF	ARM	Erik Azizyan
8	MF	ARM	Gor Malakyan
9	FW	RUS	Anton Kobyalko
10	MF	ARM	Artur Grigoryan
11	MF	ARM	Hovhannes Harutyunyan
12	MF	NGR	Muhammad Ladan (on loan from Sochi)
13	MF	BFA	Dramane Salou
16	GK	ARM	Vlad Chatunts
18	MF	ARM	Alik Arakelyan
19	MF	RUS	Artyom Avanesyan (on loan from Ararat-Armenia)
21	MF	ARM	Daniel Aghbalyan

No.	Pos.	Nation	Player
23	MF	ARM	Aras Özbiliz
24	FW	UKR	Yevhen Budnik
25	DF	RUS	Magomed Musalov
29	FW	UKR	Oleh Kozhushko
30	DF	ARM	Erik Avetisyan
69	DF	ARM	Robert Darbinyan
70	FW	VEN	José Balza (on loan from Deportivo La Guaira)
71	GK	RUS	Stanislav Buchnev
77	DF	UKR	Ihor Honchar
80	MF	VEN	Rommell Ibarra (on loan from Deportivo La Guaira)
88	DF	UKR	Valeriy Boldenkov
90	FW	VEN	José Caraballo
93	MF	BRA	Higor
94	GK	UKR	Herman Penkov
95	DF	UKR	Anton Bratkov
96	DF	ARM	Arman Hovhannisyan
99	FW	UKR	Mykyta Tatarkov

=== Out on loan ===
Note: Flags indicate national team as defined under FIFA eligibility rules; some limited exceptions apply. Players may hold more than one non-FIFA nationality.

No.	Pos.	Nation	Player
17	FW	ARM	Levon Vardanyan (at BKMA Yerevan)

== Transfers ==
=== In ===
Date	Position	Nationality	Name	From	Fee	Ref.
1 July 2020	FW	(Nigeria)	Steven Alfred	Sochi	Undisclosed	
23 July 2020	MF	(Armenia)	Artur Grigoryan	Gandzasar Kapan	Undisclosed	
24 July 2020	FW	(Russia)	Anton Kobyalko	Ararat-Armenia	Free	
29 July 2020	GK	(Russia)	Stanislav Buchnev	Fakel Voronezh	Undisclosed	
1 August 2020	DF	(Ivory Coast)	Alexandre Yeoule	Lori	Undisclosed	
3 August 2020	MF	(Armenia)	Gor Malakyan	Ararat-Armenia	Undisclosed	
15 August 2020	MF	(Burkina Faso)	Dramane Salou	Slutsk	Undisclosed	
21 August 2020	MF	(Nigeria)	Julius Ufuoma	Lori	Undisclosed	
1 September 2020	DF	(Russia)	Magomed Musalov	Akhmat Grozny	Free	
1 September 2020	MF	(Ukraine)	Artem Habelok	Vorskla Poltava	Undisclosed	
25 January 2021	DF	(Armenia)	Arman Hovhannisyan	Tobol	Free	
26 January 2021	DF	(Ukraine)	Ihor Honchar	Alashkert	Undisclosed	
27 January 2021	DF	(Ukraine)	Anton Bratkov	Metalist 1925 Kharkiv	Undisclosed	
27 January 2021	DF	(Armenia)	Robert Darbinyan	Urartu	Undisclosed	
29 January 2021	FW	(Ukraine)	Mykyta Tatarkov	Vorskla Poltava	Undisclosed	
1 February 2021	GK	(Ukraine)	Herman Penkov	Lviv	Undisclosed	
3 February 2021	MF	(Brazil)	Higor	Botafogo da Paraíba	Undisclosed	
4 February 2021	MF	(Armenia)	Hovhannes Harutyunyan	Ararat-Armenia	Free	
11 February 2021	DF	(Ukraine)	Valeriy Boldenkov	Volyn Lutsk	Undisclosed	
15 February 2021	FW	(Venezuela)	José Caraballo	Real Santa Cruz	Undisclosed	
20 February 2021	FW	(Ukraine)	Oleh Kozhushko	Chornomorets Odesa	Undisclosed	
1 March 2021	FW	(Ukraine)	Yevhen Budnik	Urartu	Undisclosed	

=== Loans in ===
Date from	Position	Nationality	Name	From	Date to	Ref.
29 July 2020	MF	(Nigeria)	Muhammad Ladan	Sochi	End of season	
5 August 2020	FW	(Russia)	Artyom Avanesyan	Ararat-Armenia	End of season	
17 September 2020	MF	(Armenia)	Armen Nahapetyan	Ararat-Armenia	31 December 2020	
5 February 2021	DF	(Venezuela)	Rommell Ibarra	Deportivo La Guaira	End of season	
5 February 2021	FW	(Venezuela)	José Balza	Deportivo La Guaira	End of season	

=== Out ===
Date	Position	Nationality	Name	To	Fee	Ref.
10 August 2020	DF	(Armenia)	Armen Manucharyan	Rotor Volgograd	Undisclosed	
17 February 2021	DF	(Armenia)	Edmon Movsisyan	West Armenia	Undisclosed	

=== Loans out ===
Date from	Position	Nationality	Name	To	Date to	Ref.
12 February 2021	FW	(Armenia)	Levon Vardanyan	BKMA Yerevan	End of season	

=== Released ===
Date	Position	Nationality	Name	Joined	Date	Ref.
5 August 2020	GK	(Montenegro)	Andrija Dragojević	Alashkert	23 September 2020	
26 January 2021	FW	(Nigeria)	Steven Alfred	Slutsk		
30 January 2021	MF	(Ukraine)	Artem Habelok	Metalist 1925 Kharkiv		
30 January 2021	DF	(Rwanda)	Salomon Nirisarike	Urartu	19 February 2021	
10 February 2021	MF	(Armenia)	Arthur Nadiryan	Retired		
17 February 2021	DF	(Ivory Coast)	Alexandre Yeoule	Naft Maysan	13 March 2021	
20 February 2021	DF	(Armenia)	Robert Hakobyan	Shirak		
20 February 2021	DF	(Armenia)	Arsen Sargsyan			
20 February 2021	FW	(Armenia)	Narek Hovhannisyan			
31 May 2021	FW	(Russia)	Anton Kobyalko	Dynamo Barnaul		

== Friendlies ==
23 July 2020	Pyunik	4 – 0	BKMA Yerevan	Yerevan
11:00 (UTC+4)	Arakelyan; L.Vardanyan; A.Sargsyan; E.Azizyan	Report		Stadium: Yerevan Football Academy Stadium

30 July 2020	Pyunik	0 – 2	Gandzasar Kapan	Dilijan
12:00 (UTC+4)		Report	A.Kocharyan; D.Minasyan

6 August 2020	Pyunik	2 – 4	Van	Dilijan
12:00 (UTC+4)	Goal	Report	V.Ayvazyan; M.Manasyan

6 August 2020	Urartu	v	Pyunik	Yerevan
18:00 (UTC+4)				Stadium: Urartu Training Centre
Note: Match cancelled on 4 August.

5 September 2020	Pyunik	0 – 2	Ararat Yerevan	Yerevan
13:30 (UTC+4)		Report	Nenadović; Papikyan	Stadium: Football Academy Stadium

21 January 2021	Urartu	2 – 2	Pyunik	Yerevan
13:00 (UTC+4)	Désiré; E.Grigoryan	Report	L.Vardanyan; A.Avanesyan	Stadium: Urartu Stadium

24 January 2021	Pyunik	0 – 2	Van	Yerevan
14:00 (UTC+4)		Report	Goal	Stadium: Pyunik Training Centre

28 January 2021	Pyunik	1 – 1	West Armenia	Yerevan
14:00 (UTC+4)	Arakelyan	Report	Goal	Stadium: Pyunik Training Centre

2 February 2021	Pyunik (Armenia)	1 – 0	(Russia) Rodina Moscow	Sharjah, United Arab Emirates
17:00 (UTC+4)	Kozhushko	Report

5 February 2021	Pyunik (Armenia)	1 – 0	(Belarus) Shakhtyor Soligorsk	Sharjah, United Arab Emirates
16:00 (UTC+4)	Higor 5'	Report

12 February 2021	Pyunik (Armenia)	–	(Russia) Zenit St.Petersburg	Dubai, United Arab Emirates
(UTC+4)
Note: Match cancelled on 11 February.

31 March 2021	Pyunik	1 – 1	Sevan	Yerevan
15:00 (UTC+4)	Budnik	Report	Goal	Stadium: Alashkert Stadium

== Competitions ==
=== Overall record ===
Competition	First match	Last match	Starting round	Final position	Record							
Competition	First match	Last match	Starting round	Final position	Pld	W	D	L	GF	GA	GD	Win %
Premier League	16 August 2020	28 May 2021	Matchday 1	7th	24	6	7	11	20	18	+2	25.00
Armenian Cup	19 September 2020	25 February 2021	First round	First round	2	0	1	1	1	2	−1	0.00
Total					26	6	8	12	21	20	+1	23.08

Last updated: 28 May 2021
Source: Competitions

=== Premier League ===
==== Results summary ====
Overall								Home						Away					
Pld	W	D	L	GF	GA	GD	Pts	W	D	L	GF	GA	GD	W	D	L	GF	GA	GD
24	6	7	11	20	17	+3	25	0	6	5	4	9	−5	6	1	6	16	8	+8

Last updated: 28 May 2021.
Source: See Results

==== Results by round ====
Round	1	2	3	4	5	6	7	8	9	10	11	12	13	14	15	16	17	18	19	20	21	22	23	24	25
Ground	A	H	A	-	A	A	H	H	H	H	H	A	A	H	A	A	A	A	H	A	H	A	H	A	H
Result	L	D	L	-	L	D	D	D	D	L	L	L	W	D	W	L	W	W	L	L	D	W	L	W	L
Position	9	7	8	-	9	9	9	8	8	8	9	9	8	8	8	8	8	8	8	8	8	7	7	7	7

Updated to match(es) played on 28 May 2021. Source: See Results
A = Away; H = Home; W = Win; D = Draw; L = Loss

==== Results ====
16 August 2020 1	Ararat Yerevan	1 – 0	Pyunik	Yerevan
19:30 (UTC+4)	Z.Margaryan (yellow card) 67'; Nenadović 89'	Report	A.Yeoule (yellow card) 49'	Stadium: Republican Stadium; Attendance: 0 Referee: Ashot Ghaltakchyan
Note: Match played behind closed doors due to the COVID-19 pandemic.

23 August 2020 2	Pyunik	0 – 0	Urartu	Yerevan
19:30 (UTC+4)	Arakelyan (yellow card) 24'; Malakyan (yellow card) 80'; J.Ufuoma (yellow card) 88'	Report	Désiré (yellow card) 27'; Osipov (yellow card) 82'	Stadium: Republican Stadium; Attendance: 0 Referee: Zaven Hovhannisyan
Note: Match played behind closed doors due to the COVID-19 pandemic.

29 August 2020 3	Van	1 – 0	Pyunik	Charentsavan
16:45 (UTC+4)	Eza 43'	Report	A.Avanesyan (yellow card) 75'; Özbiliz (yellow card) 90+3'	Stadium: Charentsavan City Stadium; Attendance: 0 Referee: Ashot Ghaltakchyan
Note: Match played behind closed doors due to the COVID-19 pandemic.

12 September 2020 4	Gandzasar Kapan	0 – 2	Pyunik	Yerevan
19:45 (UTC+4)	A.Hovhannisyan (yellow card) 62'; Coelho (yellow card) 82'	Report	Kobyalko 30', 55'; Nirisarike (yellow card) 33'; J.Ufuoma (yellow card) 47'; R.Hakobyan (yellow card) 65'; Buchnev (yellow card) 88'	Stadium: Yerevan Football Academy Stadium; Attendance: 0 Referee: Henrik Nalbandyan
Note: Match played at the Yerevan Football Academy Stadium in Yerevan instead of Gandzasar Kapan's regular Gandzasar Stadium in Kapan. Match played behind closed doors due to the COVID-19 pandemic. Match annulled after Gandzasar Kapan dropped out of the league.

23 September 2020 5	Lori	1 – 0	Pyunik	Vanadzor
16:15 (UTC+4)	A.Avagyan (yellow card) 15'; Claudir 41'; Fernandinho (yellow card) 72'; Gomelko (yellow card) 89'; D.Paremuzyan (yellow card) 90+3'	Report	J.Ufuoma (yellow card) 34'; S.Grigoryan (yellow card) 37'; A.Arakelyan (yellow card) 49' (yellow-red card) 90+1'	Stadium: Vanadzor Football Academy; Attendance: 0 Referee: Zaven Hovhannisyan
Note: Match played behind closed doors due to the COVID-19 pandemic.

18 October 2020 8	Alashkert	0 – 0	Pyunik	Yerevan
16:00 (UTC+4)	Perdigão (yellow card) 61'	Report	Malakyan (yellow card) 8'; Kobyalko (yellow card) 83'	Stadium: Alashkert Stadium; Attendance: 0 Referee: Shahen Aghayan
Note: Match played behind closed doors due to the COVID-19 pandemic.

31 October 2020 10	Pyunik	1 – 1	Ararat Yerevan	Yerevan
18:00 (UTC+4)	A.Avanesyan (yellow card) 54'; Kobyalko (yellow card) 61'; A.Nahapetyan 87'	Report	Khurtsidze (yellow card) 42' (goal) 81'	Stadium: Republican Stadium; Attendance: 0 Referee: Zaven Hovhannisyan
Note: Match played behind closed doors due to the COVID-19 pandemic.

21 November 2020 12	Pyunik	0 – 0	Van	Yerevan
18:00 (UTC+4)		Report	V.Ayvazyan (yellow card) 55'; Ebert (yellow card) 85'; E.Movsesyan (yellow card) 88'	Stadium: Republican Stadium; Attendance: 0 Referee: Shahen Aghayan
Note: Match played behind closed doors due to the COVID-19 pandemic.

2 December 2020 14	Pyunik	1 – 1	Lori	Yerevan
17:30 (UTC+4)	A.Arakelyan (yellow card) 62'; Alfred 74'; A.Nahapetyan (yellow card) 80'; A.Avanesyan (yellow card) 84'	Report	Rudoselskiy (yellow card) 21'; Ohayon 46'	Stadium: Republican Stadium; Attendance: 0 Referee: Henrik Nalbandyan
Note: Match played behind closed doors due to the COVID-19 pandemic.

6 December 2020 15	Pyunik	0 – 1	Ararat-Armenia	Yerevan
14:30 (UTC+4)	Kartashyan (yellow card) 26'	Report	Mailson 25' (pen.); Ângelo (yellow card) 82'	Stadium: Republican Stadium; Attendance: 0 Referee: Ashot Ghaltakchyan
Note: Match played behind closed doors due to the COVID-19 pandemic.

12 December 2020 7	Pyunik	0 – 1	Shirak	Yerevan
16:30 (UTC+4)	A.Nahapetyan (yellow card) 85'	Report	L.Mryan 11'; A.Arzoyan (yellow card) 43'; A.Gevorkyan 47'	Stadium: Republican Stadium; Attendance: 0 Referee: Artem Gasparyan
Note: Match played behind closed doors due to the COVID-19 pandemic.

21 February 2021 6	Ararat-Armenia	2 – 1	Pyunik	Yerevan
14:45 (UTC+4)	D.Terteryan (yellow card) 21'; Karapetian 45'; Wbeymar 51'; Rashidi (yellow card) 77'	Report	Tatarkov 8'	Stadium: Urartu-3 Stadium; Attendance: 0 Referee: Artem Gasparyan
Note: Match played behind closed doors due to the COVID-19 pandemic.

1 March 2021 16	Shirak	0 – 2	Pyunik	Gyumri
14:00 (UTC+4)	E.Vardanyan (yellow card) 1'; A.Gevorkyan (yellow card) 53'	Report	Tatarkov 57'; Harutyunyan (yellow card) 89'; Kozhushko 90+1'	Stadium: Gyumri Football Academy; Attendance: 0 Referee: Artur Tavakalyan
Note: Match played behind closed doors due to the COVID-19 pandemic.

5 March 2021 17	Pyunik	1 – 1	Alashkert	Yerevan
14:00 (UTC+4)	Caraballo 43'; Tatarkov (yellow card) 45'	Report	Grigoryan (yellow card) 33'; Gome (yellow card) 60'; Thiago Galvão 69'	Stadium: Republican Stadium; Referee: Henrik Nalbandyan

16 March 2021 18	Noah	0 – 1	Pyunik	Yerevan
15:00 (UTC+4)	Gareginyan (yellow card) 45'; Titov (yellow card) 80'; V.Vimercati (yellow card) 86'	Report	Grigoryan 45'; Honchar (yellow card) 45'; Buchnev (yellow card) 70'; Tatarkov (yellow card) 80'; Kobyalko (yellow card) 84' (penalty missed) 88'	Stadium: FFA Academy Stadium; Attendance: 500; Referee: Ashot Ghaltakchyan

9 April 2021 19	Noah	1 – 0	Pyunik	Yerevan
14:00 (UTC+4)	Azarov (yellow card) 6' (goal) 90+4'; Kovalenko (yellow card) 18'; Kryuchkov (yellow card) 54'; V.Vimercati (yellow card) 90+1'	Report		Stadium: FFA Academy Stadium; Attendance: 300; Referee: Ashot Ghaltakchyan

14 April 2021 20	Van	0 – 3	Pyunik	Charentsavan
14:30 (UTC+4)	D.Dosa (red card) 29'; Voskanyan (yellow card) 66'; E.Mireku (yellow card) 75'	Report	Arakelyan 31'; Tatarkov (yellow card) 51'; Higor 82'; Caraballo 85'; Salou (yellow card) 89'	Stadium: Charentsavan City Stadium; Attendance: 300; Referee: Artur Tavakalyan

19 April 2021 11	Urartu	0 – 1	Pyunik	Yerevan
19:00 (UTC+4)	Hakobyan (yellow card) 21'; Désiré (yellow card) 44'	Report	Tatarkov (yellow card) 82'; Higor 90'; Buchnev (yellow card) 90'	Stadium: Urartu Stadium; Attendance: 1,800; Referee: Artur Safaryan
Note: Match originally scheduled for 4 November, but postponed on 2 November due to the COVID-19 pandemic.

25 April 2021 21	Pyunik	1 – 2	Ararat Yerevan	Yerevan
16:00 (UTC+4)	J.Balza 17'; Kozhushko (yellow card) 89'; Ibarra (yellow card) 90'	Report	Honchar 35' (o.g.); Nenadović 54'; Khurtsidze (yellow card) 88'; Malakyan (yellow card) 90'	Stadium: Republican Stadium; Attendance: 1,200; Referee: Artur Safaryan

6 May 2021 22	Alashkert	1 – 0	Pyunik	Yerevan
15:00 (UTC+4)	Glišić (yellow card) 38'; Kadio (yellow card) 58'; Jovanović (yellow card) 62'; Mihajlović 65'; V.Minasyan (yellow card) 78'	Report	Hovhannisyan (yellow card) 70'	Stadium: Alashkert Stadium; Attendance: 200; Referee: Ashot Ghaltakchyan

11 May 2021 23	Pyunik	0 – 0	Ararat-Armenia	Yerevan
19:30 (UTC+4)	Tatarkov (yellow card) 46'; Kozhushko (yellow card) 82'; Hovhannisyan (yellow card) 87'	Report	Bueno (yellow card) 51'; Alemão (yellow card) 72'; A.Khachumyan (yellow card) 78'; Gouffran (yellow card) 82'	Stadium: Republican Stadium; Attendance: 500; Referee: Artem Gasparyan

14 May 2021 26	Lori	0 – 3	Pyunik	Vanadzor
(UTC+4)		Report		Stadium: Vanadzor Football Academy
Note: Match awarded 3-0 to Pyunik.

15 May 2021 9	Pyunik	0 – 1	Noah	Yerevan
15:00 (UTC+4)	Kartashyan (yellow card) 6'; A.Avanesyan (yellow card) 67'; Grigoryan (yellow card) 69'; J.Balza (red card) 75'; Salou (yellow card) 90+4'	Report	Emsis (yellow card) 24'; S.Gomes (yellow card) 67'; Azarov (yellow card) 69'; Avetisyan 89'	Stadium: FFA Academy Stadium; Referee: Zaven Hovhannisyan
Note: Match originally scheduled for 24 October, but postponed on 22 October due to the COVID-19 pandemic.

20 May 2021 24	Shirak	1 – 5	Pyunik	Gyumri
15:30 (UTC+4)	Honchar 68' (o.g.); H.Nazaryan (yellow card) 68'	Report	Caraballo 8'; Salou (yellow card) 29'; Kozhushko 31'; Harutyunyan 42' (yellow card) 77'; A.Arakelyan (yellow card) 51'; V.Chiloyan 75'; A.Avanesyan 87'	Stadium: Gyumri Football Academy; Referee: Artur Safaryan

28 May 2021 25	Pyunik	0 – 1	Urartu	Yerevan
17:30 (UTC+4)	A.Avanesyan (yellow card) 90'	Report	A.Miranyan 10'	Stadium: Urartu Stadium; Referee: Ashot Ghaltakchyan

==== Table ====
Pos	Team	Pld	W	D	L	GF	GA	GD	Pts	Qualification or relegation
1	Alashkert (C)	24	13	7	4	25	15	+10	46	Qualification for the Champions League first qualifying round
2	Noah	24	12	5	7	35	20	+15	41	Qualification for the Europa Conference League first qualifying round
3	Urartu	24	12	5	7	28	19	+9	41	Qualification for the Europa Conference League first qualifying round
4	Ararat (Note: Ararat qualified for Europa Conference League first qualifying round as winners of 2020–21 Armenian Cup.)	24	11	7	6	34	18	+16	40	Qualification for the Europa Conference League first qualifying round
5	Ararat-Armenia	24	10	8	6	32	17	+15	38	
6	Van	24	9	4	11	25	30	−5	31	
7	Pyunik	24	6	7	11	20	18	+2	25	
8	Lori (Note: Round 19–27 matches involving Lori were all declared 3–0 forfeits in favor of the remaining 8 teams.)	24	7	2	15	16	44	−28	23	
9	Shirak (R)	24	2	7	15	19	53	−34	13	Relegation to First League
10	Gandzasar (R, D)	0	0	0	0	0	0	0	0	Club disqualified (Note: Gandzasar were excluded from the league On 3 November, Gandzasar Kapan announced that they were withdrawing from the League and Armenian Cup due to the ongoing financial constraints relating to the ongoing COVID-19 pandemic in Armenia and the 2020 Nagorno-Karabakh conflict.)

Source: FFA Soccerway
Rules for classification: 1) Points; 2) Play-off (only if deciding champion); 3) Matches won; 4) Head-to-head points; 5) Head-to-head matches won; 6) Head-to-head goal difference; 7) Head-to-head goals scored; 8) Head-to-head away goals scored; 9) Goal difference; 10) Goals scored.
(C) Champions; (D) Disqualified; (R) Relegated

=== Armenian Cup ===
18 September 2020 First Round 1st leg	Urartu	2 – 1	Pyunik	Yerevan
19:30 (UTC+4)	Guz 37'; James (yellow card) 41'; Darbinyan (yellow card) 50'; Radchenko 90+1'	Report	Kobyalko 3'; A.Yeoule (yellow card) 27'; S.Grigoryan (yellow card) 68'; Nirisarike (yellow card) 80'; L.Vardanyan (yellow card) 82'	Stadium: Urartu Stadium; Attendance: 150; Referee: Artem Gasparyan

25 February 2021 First Round 2nd leg	Pyunik	0 – 0 (1 – 2 agg.)	Urartu	Yerevan
14:00 (UTC+4)	Higor (yellow card) 55'	Report	Nirisarike (yellow card) 46'; Polyakov (yellow card) 69'; E.Grigoryan (red card) 90'	Stadium: Pyunik Training Centre; Attendance: 0 Referee: Henrik Nalbandyan
Note: Match played behind closed doors due to the COVID-19 pandemic.

== Statistics ==
As of match played 28 May 2021

=== Appearances and goals ===
No.	Pos	Nat	Player	Total		Premier League		Armenian Cup	
No.	Pos	Nat	Player	Apps	Goals	Apps	Goals	Apps	Goals
2	DF	(Armenia) ARM	Serob Grigoryan	21	1	19+1	1	1	0
3	DF	(Armenia) ARM	Artur Kartashyan	9	0	5+4	0	0	0
5	MF	(Nigeria) NGR	Julius Ufuoma	10	0	5+4	0	1	0
7	MF	(Armenia) ARM	Erik Azizyan	7	0	0+7	0	0	0
8	MF	(Armenia) ARM	Gor Malakyan	11	0	8+2	0	1	0
9	FW	(Russia) RUS	Anton Kobyalko	18	3	9+7	2	1+1	1
10	MF	(Armenia) ARM	Artur Grigoryan	20	0	8+11	0	0+1	0
11	MF	(Armenia) ARM	Hovhannes Harutyunyan	12	1	4+7	1	0+1	0
12	MF	(Nigeria) NGR	Muhammad Ladan	8	0	5+2	0	0+1	0
13	MF	(Burkina Faso) BFA	Dramane Salou	22	0	18+2	0	1+1	0
18	MF	(Armenia) ARM	Alik Arakelyan	25	1	22+1	1	2	0
19	FW	(Russia) RUS	Artyom Avanesyan	23	1	12+9	1	1+1	0
23	MF	(Armenia) ARM	Aras Özbiliz	7	0	6	0	1	0
24	FW	(Ukraine) UKR	Yevhen Budnik	8	0	2+6	0	0	0
25	DF	(Russia) RUS	Magomed Musalov	5	0	3+1	0	1	0
29	FW	(Ukraine) UKR	Oleh Kozhushko	14	2	5+8	2	1	0
33	DF	(Armenia) ARM	Artak Asatryan	1	0	0+1	0	0	0
44	FW	(Armenia) ARM	Vrezh Chiloyan	2	1	0+2	1	0	0
70	FW	(Venezuela) VEN	José Balza	5	1	4+1	1	0	0
71	GK	(Russia) RUS	Stanislav Buchnev	20	0	19	0	1	0
77	DF	(Ukraine) UKR	Ihor Honchar	14	0	12+1	0	1	0
80	MF	(Venezuela) VEN	Rommell Ibarra	6	0	5+1	0	0	0
88	DF	(Ukraine) UKR	Valeriy Boldenkov	8	0	5+2	0	1	0
90	FW	(Venezuela) VEN	José Caraballo	13	3	12	3	0+1	0
93	MF	(Brazil) BRA	Higor	9	2	5+3	2	1	0
94	GK	(Ukraine) UKR	Herman Penkov	8	0	5+2	0	1	0
95	DF	(Ukraine) UKR	Anton Bratkov	10	0	9	0	1	0
96	DF	(Armenia) ARM	Arman Hovhannisyan	9	0	8	0	1	0
99	FW	(Ukraine) UKR	Mykyta Tatarkov	13	2	12	2	1	0
Players away on loan:
17	FW	(Armenia) ARM	Levon Vardanyan	10	0	2+7	0	0+1	0
Players who left Pyunik during the season:
15	DF	(Ivory Coast) CIV	Alexandre Yeoule	12	0	11	0	1	0
20	MF	(Ukraine) UKR	Artem Habelok	8	0	6+1	0	1	0
22	DF	(Armenia) ARM	Robert Hakobyan	7	0	5+2	0	0	0
24	DF	(Rwanda) RWA	Salomon Nirisarike	11	0	10	0	1	0
29	FW	(Nigeria) NGR	Steven Alfred	8	1	3+5	1	0	0
77	MF	(Armenia) ARM	Armen Nahapetyan	6	1	0+5	1	0+1	0

=== Goal scorers ===
Place	Position	Nation	Number	Name	Premier League	Armenian Cup	Total
1	FW	(Venezuela)	90	José Caraballo	3	0	3
1	FW	(Russia)	9	Anton Kobyalko	2	1	3
3	FW	(Ukraine)	99	Mykyta Tatarkov	2	0	2
3	MF	(Brazil)	88	Higor	2	0	2
3	FW	(Ukraine)	29	Oleh Kozhushko	2	0	2
5	MF	(Armenia)	77	Armen Nahapetyan	1	0	1
5	FW	(Nigeria)	29	Steven Alfred	1	0	1
5	DF	(Armenia)	2	Serob Grigoryan	1	0	1
5	MF	(Armenia)	18	Alik Arakelyan	1	0	1
5	FW	(Venezuela)	70	José Balza	1	0	1
5	MF	(Armenia)	11	Hovhannes Harutyunyan	1	0	1
5	FW	(Armenia)	44	Vrezh Chiloyan	1	0	1
5	FW	(Russia)	19	Artyom Avanesyan	1	0	1
				TOTALS	19	1	20

=== Clean sheets ===
Place	Position	Nation	Number	Name	Premier League	Armenian Cup	Total
1	GK	(Russia)	71	Stanislav Buchnev	7	0	7
2	GK	(Ukraine)	94	Herman Penkov	2	1	3
				TOTALS	8	1	9

Buchnev & Penkov both played in Pyumol's 3-0 win over Van on 14 April 2021

=== Disciplinary record ===
Number	Nation	Position	Name	Premier League		Armenian Cup		Total	
Number	Nation	Position	Name	Booked	Sent off (straight red)	Booked	Sent off (straight red)	Booked	Sent off (straight red)
2	(Armenia)	DF	Serob Grigoryan	2	0	1	0	3	0
3	(Armenia)	DF	Artur Kartashyan	2	0	0	0	2	0
5	(Nigeria)	MF	Julius Ufuoma	3	0	0	0	3	0
8	(Armenia)	MF	Gor Malakyan	2	0	0	0	2	0
9	(Russia)	FW	Anton Kobyalko	3	0	0	0	3	0
11	(Armenia)	MF	Hovhannes Harutyunyan	2	0	0	0	2	0
13	(Burkina Faso)	DF	Dramane Salou	3	0	0	0	3	0
18	(Armenia)	MF	Alik Arakelyan	5	1	0	0	5	1
19	(Russia)	FW	Artyom Avanesyan	5	0	0	0	5	0
23	(Armenia)	MF	Aras Özbiliz	1	0	0	0	1	0
29	(Ukraine)	FW	Oleh Kozhushko	2	0	0	0	2	0
70	(Venezuela)	FW	José Balza	0	1	0	0	0	1
71	(Russia)	GK	Stanislav Buchnev	3	0	0	0	3	0
77	(Ukraine)	DF	Ihor Honchar	1	0	0	0	1	0
80	(Venezuela)	MF	Rommell Ibarra	1	0	0	0	1	0
93	(Brazil)	MF	Higor	0	0	1	0	1	0
96	(Armenia)	DF	Arman Hovhannisyan	2	0	0	0	2	0
99	(Ukraine)	FW	Mykyta Tatarkov	5	0	0	0	5	0
Players away on loan:
17	(Armenia)	MF	Levon Vardanyan	0	0	1	0	1	0
Players who left Pyunik during the season:
15	(Ivory Coast)	DF	Alexandre Yeoule	1	0	1	0	2	0
22	(Armenia)	DF	Robert Hakobyan	1	0	0	0	1	0
24	(Rwanda)	DF	Salomon Nirisarike	1	0	1	0	2	0
77	(Armenia)	MF	Armen Nahapetyan	2	0	0	0	2	0
			TOTALS	47	2	5	0	52	2
