= Rommell Ibarra =

Venezuelan footballer (born 2000)

Personal information
- Full name: Rommell Jhoan Ibarra Hernández
- Date of birth: 24 March 2000 (age 26)
- Place of birth: Caracas, Venezuela
- Height: 1.78 m (5 ft 10 in)
- Position: Defender

Team information
- Current team: Deportivo La Guaira
- Number: 13

Senior career*
Years	Team	Apps	(Gls)
2017–	Deportivo La Guaira	115	(3)
2021	→ Pyunik (loan)	8	(0)

International career^{‡}
2017	Venezuela U17	3	(0)
2018–	Venezuela U20	14	(0)
- * Club domestic league appearances and goals as of 10 March 2026 ‡ National team caps and goals as of 14:11, 30 January 2019 (UTC)

Rommell Jhoan Ibarra Hernández (born 24 March 2000) is a Venezuelan footballer who plays as a defender for Deportivo La Guaira.

== Career ==
On 5 February 2021, FC Pyunik announced the signing of Ibarra on loan from Deportivo La Guaira. On 6 December 2021, Pyunik announced that Ibarra had left the club after his contract had expired.

== Career statistics ==
=== Club ===
As of match played 6 August 2021.

Club	Season	League			Cup		Continental		Other		Total	
Club	Season	Division	Apps	Goals	Apps	Goals	Apps	Goals	Apps	Goals	Apps	Goals
Deportivo La Guaira	2017	Venezuelan Primera División	9	0	1	0	–		—		10	0
Deportivo La Guaira	2018	Venezuelan Primera División	17	0	1	0	—		—		19	0
Deportivo La Guaira	2019	Venezuelan Primera División	20	1	2	0	1 (Note: Appearances in the Copa Libertadores)	0	—		16	1
Deportivo La Guaira	2020	Venezuelan Primera División	8	0	0	0	—		—		8	0
Deportivo La Guaira	Total		54	1	3	0	1	0	0	0	58	1
Pyunik (loan)	2020–21	Armenian Premier League	6	0	0	0	—		—		6	0
Pyunik (loan)	2021–22	Armenian Premier League	2	0	0	0	—		—		2	0
Pyunik (loan)	Total		8	0	0	0	-	-	-	-	8	0
Career total			62	1	3	0	1	0	0	0	66	1
