= Vladimir Khozin =

Russian footballer

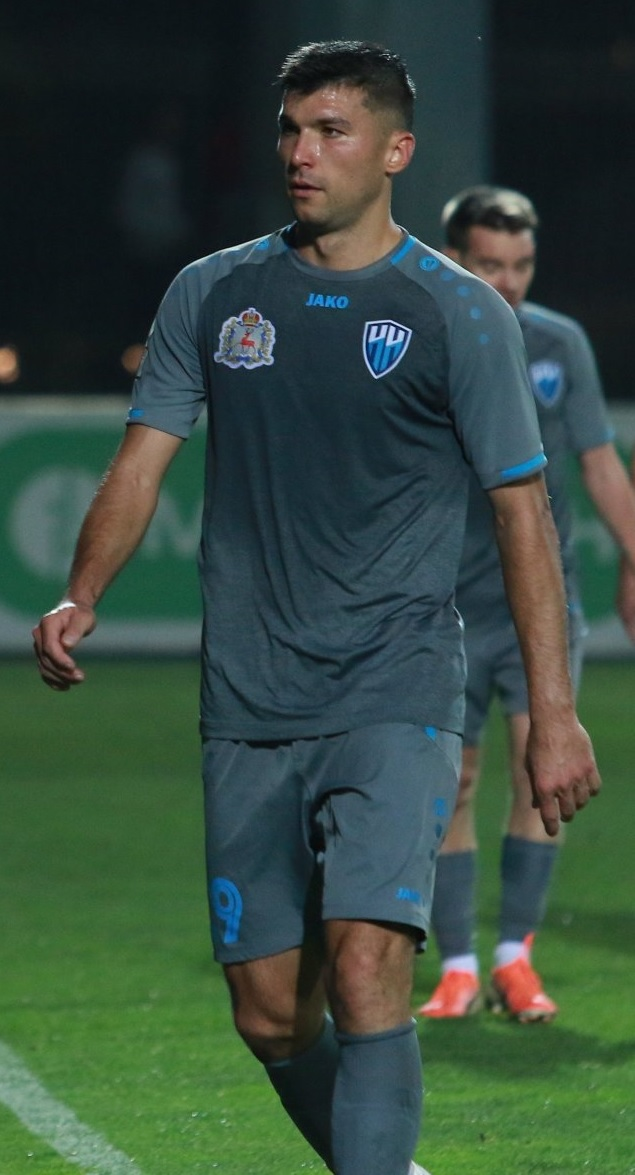
- Khozin with Nizhny Novgorod in 2019

Personal information
- Full name: Vladimir Vyacheslavovich Khozin
- Date of birth: 3 July 1989 (age 37)
- Place of birth: Rostov-on-Don, Russian SFSR
- Height: 1.85 m (6 ft 1 in)
- Position: Right back

Team information
- Current team: Shakhtyor Donetsk
- Number: 2

Senior career*
Years	Team	Apps	(Gls)
2006–2007	Rostov	1	(0)
2008–2009	Moscow	0	(0)
2010	Krylia Sovetov Samara	2	(0)
2011–2012	Torpedo Moscow	38	(9)
2012–2013	Alania Vladikavkaz	42	(6)
2014–2019	Ural Yekaterinburg	55	(5)
2018	→ Ural-2 Yekaterinburg	2	(0)
2018–2019	→ Ararat-Armenia (loan)	24	(3)
2019–2020	Nizhny Novgorod	21	(0)
2020–2021	Chayka Peschanokopskoye	35	(8)
2021–2022	Shakhter Karagandy	18	(0)
2022–2023	Yenisey Krasnoyarsk	10	(0)
2023	SKA Rostov-on-Don	2	(0)
2023–2024	Yenisey Krasnoyarsk	25	(2)
2024–2025	Chelyabinsk	24	(3)
2026–	Shakhtyor Donetsk	27	(3)

International career^{‡}
2008	Russia U19	1	(0)
2012	Russia-2	1	(0)
- * Club domestic league appearances and goals as of 31 October 2026 ‡ National team caps and goals as of 9 September 2012

Vladimir Vyacheslavovich Khozin (Russian: Владимир Вячеславович Хозин; born 3 July 1989) is a Russian professional footballer who plays as a right-back for Shakhtyor Donetsk.

== Club career ==
Khozin made his professional debut in the Russian Premier League for Rostov on 11 November 2007 in a game against Amkar Perm.

On 9 January 2014, Khozin signed for Ural Yekaterinburg.

In February 2016 Khozin injured his collarbone in a friendly against Sheriff Tiraspol. Whilst recovering from surgery to fix his collarbone, Khozin suffered an injury to his hip that subsequently lead to 2.5 years out of football recovering. Upon his return to training with Ural in the summer of 2018, Khozin was loaned to Ararat-Armenia until the end of 2018.

== Career statistics ==
=== Club ===
As of match played 15 April 2019

Club	Season	League			Cup		Continental		Other		Total	
Club	Season	Division	Apps	Goals	Apps	Goals	Apps	Goals	Apps	Goals	Apps	Goals
Rostov	2006	Russian Premier League	0	0	0	0	–		–		0	0
Rostov	2007	Russian Premier League	1	0	0	0	–		–		1	0
Rostov	Total		1	0	0	0	0	0	0	0	1	0
Moscow	2008	Russian Premier League	0	0	0	0	0	0	–		0	0
Moscow	2009	Russian Premier League	0	0	0	0	–		–		0	0
Moscow	Total		0	0	0	0	0	0	0	0	0	0
Krylia Sovetov	2010	Russian Premier League	2	0	0	0	–		–		2	0
Torpedo Moscow	2011–12	FNL	38	9	1	0	–		–		39	9
Alania Vladikavkaz	2012–13	Russian Premier League	27	3	0	0	–		–		27	3
Alania Vladikavkaz	2013–14	FNL	15	3	1	1	–		–		16	4
Alania Vladikavkaz	Total		42	6	1	1	0	0	0	0	43	7
Ural Yekaterinburg	2013–14	Russian Premier League	11	2	–		–		–		11	2
Ural Yekaterinburg	2014–15	Russian Premier League	29	3	1	0	–		1 (Note: One appearance in relegation play-offs)	0	31	3
Ural Yekaterinburg	2015–16	Russian Premier League	14	0	1	0	–		–		15	0
Ural Yekaterinburg	2016–17	Russian Premier League	1	0	0	0	–		–		1	0
Ural Yekaterinburg	2017–18	Russian Premier League	0	0	0	0	–		–		0	0
Ural Yekaterinburg	2018–19	Russian Premier League	0	0	0	0	–		–		0	0
Ural Yekaterinburg	Total		55	5	2	0	0	0	1	0	58	5
Ararat-Armenia (loan)	2018–19	Armenian Premier League	19	2	3	0	–		–		22	2
Career total			157	22	7	1	0	0	1	0	165	23
