= Valeriy Boldenkov =

Moldovan-born Ukrainian footballer

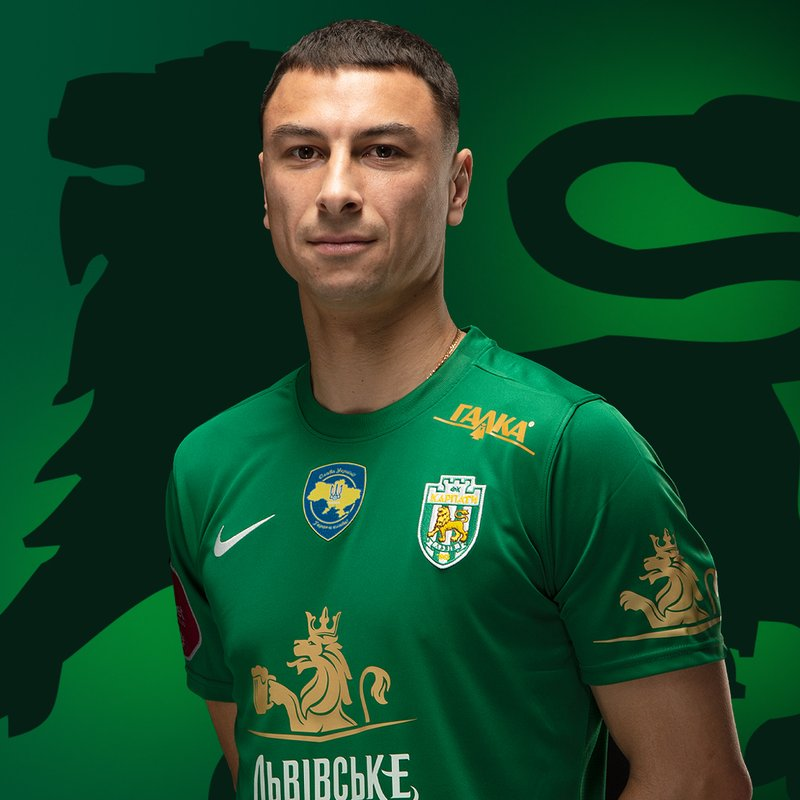

Personal information
- Full name: Valeriy Ihorovych Boldenkov
- Date of birth: 8 September 1994 (age 32)
- Place of birth: Otaci, Moldova
- Height: 1.91 m (6 ft 3 in)
- Position: Centre-back

Team information
- Current team: Feniks-Mariupol
- Number: 4

Youth career
- 2001–2007: FC Nistru Otaci
- 2007–2011: FC BRW-BIK Volodymyr-Volynskyi

Senior career*
| Years | Team | Apps | (Gls) |
| 2014–2017 | Dynamo Kyiv | 0 | (0) |
| 2014–2015 | → Dynamo-2 Kyiv | 16 | (0) |
| 2017 | Petrocub Hîncești | 4 | (0) |
| 2018–2020 | Volyn Lutsk | 54 | (4) |
| 2021 | Pyunik Yerevan | 7 | (0) |
| 2021–2023 | Karpaty Lviv | 30 | (2) |
| 2023 | Podillya Khmelnytskyi | 8 | (1) |
| 2024–2025 | Prykarpattia Ivano-Frankivsk | 27 | (0) |
| 2025– | Feniks-Mariupol | 4 | (0) |

International career
| 2015 | Ukraine U21 | 6 | (0) |
- * Club domestic league appearances and goals as of 27 December 2025

Valeriy Ihorovych Boldenkov (Ukrainian: Валерій Ігорович Болденков; born 8 September 1994) is a Moldovan-born Ukrainian footballer who plays as a centre-back for Feniks-Mariupol.

== Career ==
Boldenkov is a product of the Moldovan FC Nistru Otaci and BRW-BIK Volodymyr-Volynskyi youth sportive schools. He transferred to Ukraine in 2007 and was granted Ukrainian citizenship in 2010.

He spent his career in the Ukrainian Premier League Reserves and in July 2014 went to play for FC Dynamo-2 in the Ukrainian First League. Boldenkov made his debut in the Ukrainian First League for the club FC Dynamo-2 Kyiv in a match against FC Desna Chernihiv on 27 September 2014 entraining in the second half.

== Note ==
Valeriy Boldenkov (Romanian: Valerii Boldencov) has two profiles at Soccerway. One as a Ukrainian footballer and another as a Moldovan footballer.
