= Georgi Pashov =

Bulgarian footballer (born 1990)

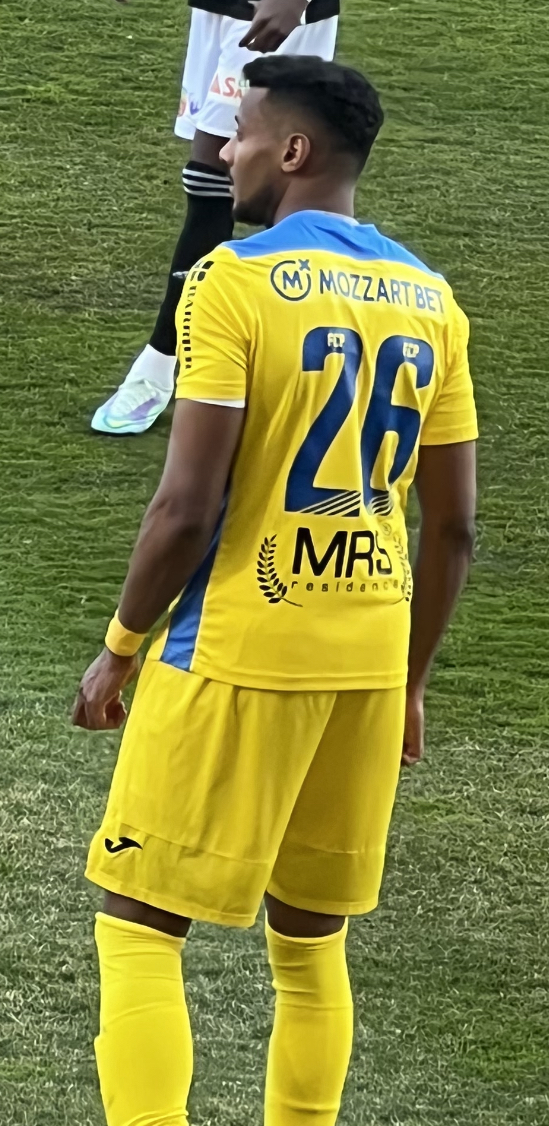
- Pashov with Petrolul Ploiești in 2022

Personal information
- Full name: Georgi Velikov Pashov
- Date of birth: 4 March 1990 (age 36)
- Place of birth: Plovdiv, Bulgaria
- Height: 1.84 m (6 ft 0 in)
- Position: Right-back

Team information
- Current team: Sportist Svoge
- Number: 4

Youth career
- –2008: Pirin Blagoevgrad
- 2008–2009: Litex Lovech

Senior career*
Years	Team	Apps	(Gls)
2009–2011	Chavdar Etropole	56	(2)
2012–2014	Slavia Sofia	15	(0)
2012–2013	→ Montana (loan)	18	(1)
2014–2016	Montana	45	(2)
2016–2017	Slavia Sofia	27	(0)
2017	Lokomotiv Plovdiv	7	(0)
2018	Etar	11	(2)
2018–2019	Ararat-Armenia	31	(2)
2020	Zhetysu	0	(0)
2020–2021	Academica Clinceni	44	(1)
2022–2023	Petrolul Ploiești	24	(0)
2023–2024	Gloria Buzău	5	(0)
2024	Dobrudzha Dobrich	8	(0)
2024–	Sportist Svoge	7	(0)

International career
2007–2009	Bulgaria U19	9	(0)
2010–2012	Bulgaria U21	18	(0)
2019	Bulgaria	3	(0)
- * Club domestic league appearances and goals as of 26 May 2024

Georgi Velikov Pashov (Bulgarian: Георги Великов Пашов; born 4 March 1990) is a Bulgarian professional footballer who plays as a right-back for Sportist Svoge.

== Club career ==
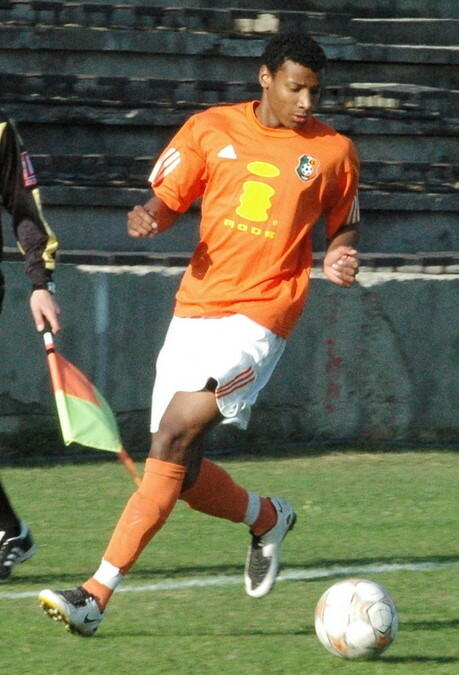
Pashov playing for Litex Lovech as a junior in 2008

On 20 July 2017, Pashov signed a 2-year contract with Lokomotiv Plovdiv.

On 5 January 2018, Pashov joined Etar where he played regularly, but his contract was terminated in June by mutual consent.

In June 2018, Pashov signed a two-year contract with Armenian club Ararat-Armenia. In January 2020, he moved to Zhetysu in the Kazakhstan Premier League, with the contract to run for one season. However, as football in Kazakhstan was suspended on numerous occasions due to the COVID-19 pandemic, he did not get to play in any official matches for the team. In August 2020, Pashov joined Romanian team Academica Clinceni.

== International career ==
In August 2019 Pashov received his first call up for Bulgaria for the UEFA Euro 2020 Qualification match against England and the friendly match against Ireland on 7 and 10 September, making his debut in the latter match held on 10 September, playing the full 90 minutes.

== Personal life ==
Pashov is Bulgarian on his father's side and Ukrainian through his mother, while also having some African ancestry in his maternal lineage.

== Career statistics ==
=== Club ===
As of match played 29 October 2023

Appearances and goals by club, season and competition
Club	Season	League			National cup		Continental		Other		Total	
Club	Season	Division	Apps	Goals	Apps	Goals	Apps	Goals	Apps	Goals	Apps	Goals
Chavdar Etropole	2009–10	B Group	19	1	2	0	–		–		21	1
Chavdar Etropole	2010–11	B Group	23	1	2	0	–		–		25	1
Chavdar Etropole	2011–12	B Group	14	0	1	0	–		–		15	0
Chavdar Etropole	Total		56	2	5	0	0	0	!0	0	!61	2
Slavia Sofia	2011–12	A Group	2	0	0	0	–		–		2	0
Slavia Sofia	2012–13	A Group	0	0	0	0	–		–		0	0
Slavia Sofia	2013–14	A Group	13	0	3	0	–		–		16	0
Slavia Sofia	Total		15	0	3	0	0	0	!0	0	!18	0
Montana (loan)	2012–13	A Group	18	1	0	0	–		–		18	1
Montana	2014–15	B Group	23	1	2	0	–		–		25	1
Montana	2015–16	A Group	22	1	1	0	–		–		23	1
Montana	Total		45	2	3	0	0	0	!0	0	!48	2
Slavia Sofia	2016–17	Bulgarian First League	31	0	0	0	2	0	–		33	0
Lokomotiv Plovdiv	2017–18	Bulgarian First League	7	0	1	0	–		–		8	0
Etar Veliko Tarnovo	2017–18	Bulgarian First League	15	2	0	0	–		–		15	2
Ararat-Armenia	2018–19	Armenian Premier League	24	2	5	0	–		–		29	2
Ararat-Armenia	2019–20	Armenian Premier League	7	0	1	0	8	0	0	0	16	0
Ararat-Armenia	Total		31	2	6	0	8	0	0	0	45	2
Academica Clinceni	2020–21	Liga I	32	1	1	0	–		–		33	1
Academica Clinceni	2021–22	Liga I	12	0	1	0	–		–		13	0
Academica Clinceni	Total		44	1	2	0	0	0	!0	0	46	1
Petrolul Ploiești	2021–22	Liga II	8	0	–		–		–		8	0
Petrolul Ploiești	2022–23	Liga I	16	0	3	0	–		–		19	0
Petrolul Ploiești	Total		24	0	3	0	–		–		27	0
Gloria Buzău	2023–24	Liga II	5	0	0	0	–		–		5	0
Career total			291	10	23	0	10	0	0	0	324	10

=== International ===
Bulgaria national team
Year	Apps	Goals
2019	3	0
Total	3	0

Statistics accurate as of match played 14 October 2019

== Honours ==
Montana

- B Group: 2014–15

Ararat-Armenia

- Armenian Premier League: 2018–19
- Armenian Super Cup: 2018–19

Petrolul Ploiești

- Liga II: 2021–22
