= Anton Kobyalko =

Russian footballer

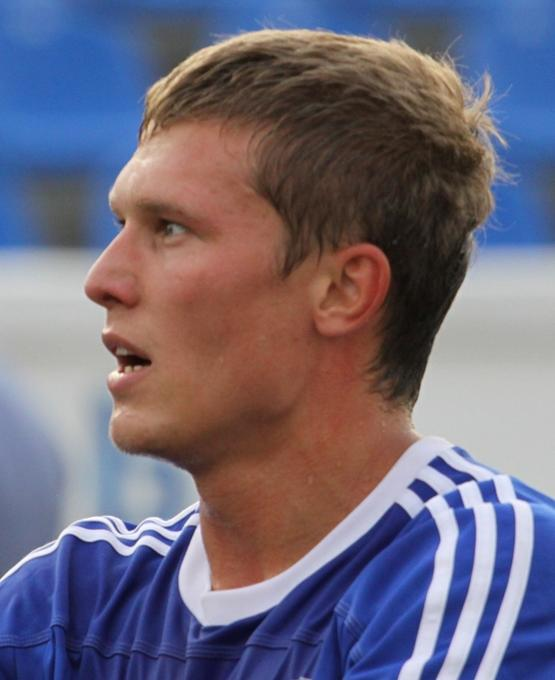

Personal information
- Full name: Anton Igorevich Kobyalko
- Date of birth: 14 May 1986 (age 40)
- Place of birth: Barnaul, Russian SFSR, Soviet Union
- Height: 1.80 m (5 ft 11 in)
- Position: Forward

Team information
- Current team: Sibir Novosibirsk
- Number: 22

Senior career*
Years	Team	Apps	(Gls)
2004–2007	Metallurg-Kuzbass Novokuznetsk	88	(28)
2008–2012	KAMAZ Naberezhnye Chelny	140	(30)
2012–2013	Ural Sverdlovsk Oblast	26	(6)
2013–2016	Gazovik Orenburg	79	(14)
2016–2017	SKA-Khabarovsk	29	(1)
2017–2018	Baltika Kaliningrad	19	(3)
2018–2020	Ararat-Armenia	48	(19)
2020–2021	Pyunik	16	(1)
2021	Dynamo Barnaul	4	(3)
2021–2024	Tyumen	61	(25)
2024–	Sibir Novosibirsk	89	(16)
- * Club domestic league appearances and goals as of 15 November 2026

Anton Igorevich Kobyalko (Russian: Антон Игоревич Кобялко; born 14 May 1986) is a Russian professional footballer who plays for Sibir Novosibirsk.

== Club career ==
Kobyalko made his professional debut in the Russian First Division in 2004 for FC Metallurg-Kuzbass Novokuznetsk.

On 20 July 2020, Kobyalko left Ararat-Armenia. On 24 July, Kobyalko signed for FC Pyunik.

== Career statistics ==
=== Club ===
As of match played 12 August 2021

Appearances and goals by club, season and competition
Club	Season	League			National Cup		Continental		Other		Total	
Club	Season	Division	Apps	Goals	Apps	Goals	Apps	Goals	Apps	Goals	Apps	Goals
Ural Sverdlovsk Oblast	2012–13	Russian FNL	26	6	0	0	–		–		26	6
Gazovik Orenburg	2013–14	Russian FNL	22	7	0	0	-		-		22	7
Gazovik Orenburg	2014–15	Russian FNL	34	6	4	2	-		-		38	8
Gazovik Orenburg	2015–16	Russian FNL	23	1	1	0	-		-		24	1
Gazovik Orenburg	Total		79	14	3	2	-	-	-	-	82	16
SKA-Khabarovsk	2016–17	Russian FNL	25	1	2	0	-		2	0	29	1
SKA-Khabarovsk	2017–18	Russian Premier League	4	0	0	0	-		-		4	0
SKA-Khabarovsk	Total		29	1	2	0	-	-	2	0	33	1
Baltika Kaliningrad	2017–18	Russian FNL	19	3	1	0	–		–		20	3
Ararat-Armenia	2018–19	Armenian Premier League	26	15	6	6	-		-		32	21
Ararat-Armenia	2019–20	Armenian Premier League	22	4	4	1	7	4	1	0	34	9
Ararat-Armenia	Total		48	19	10	7	7	4	1	0	66	30
Pyunik	2020–21	Armenian Premier League	16	1	2	1	–		–		18	2
Dynamo Barnaul	2021–22	Russian FNL2	2	1	2	3	–		–		4	4
Career total			219	45	20	13	7	4	3	0	249	62

== Honours ==
=== Club ===
Ararat-Armenia

- Armenian Premier League (2): 2018–19, 2019–20
- Armenian Supercup (1): 2019
