= Aleksey Pustozyorov =

Russian professional football player (born 1988)

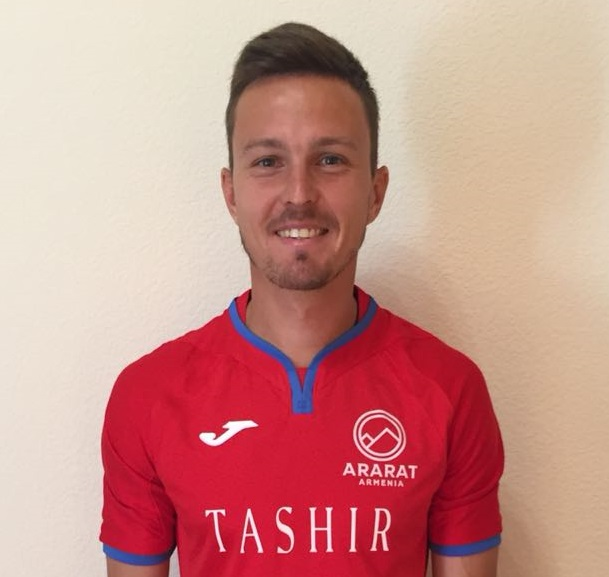

Personal information
- Full name: Aleksey Sergeyevich Pustozyorov
- Date of birth: 21 September 1988 (age 38)
- Place of birth: Sevastopol, Crimea, Ukrainian SSR
- Height: 1.80 m (5 ft 11 in)
- Position: Midfielder

Youth career
- 2005–2008: Lada Togliatti

Senior career*
Years	Team	Apps	(Gls)
2006–2009	Lada Togliatti	66	(2)
2010–2012	Tyumen	23	(4)
2012–2013	Lada Togliatti	11	(1)
2013–2014	Zenit Izhevsk	22	(0)
2014–2015	Lada Togliatti	23	(6)
2015–2017	Tyumen	77	(3)
2018	Volgar Astrakhan	11	(1)
2018–2019	Ararat-Armenia	26	(0)
2019	Slutsk	14	(1)
2020	Atyrau	11	(0)
2021	Belshina Bobruisk	12	(3)
2021–2022	Saransk	26	(0)
2022–2023	Kaluga	31	(2)
2023	Astrakhan	18	(1)
- * Club domestic league appearances and goals

Aleksey Sergeyevich Pustozyorov (Russian: Алексей Сергеевич Пустозёров; born 21 September 1988) is a Russian former professional football player.

== Career ==
=== Club ===
He played 4 seasons in the Russian Football National League for FC Lada Togliatti, FC Tyumen and FC Volgar Astrakhan.

Pustozyorov left FC Ararat-Armenia on 20 June 2019 by mutual consent. He then played for Belarusian club, FC Slutsk, for the rest of the year. In 2020, he moved to Kazakh club FC Atyrau.
