= Jerry Ortiz =

Colombian footballer (born 1992)

Personal information
- Full name: Jerry Alberto Ortíz Cortés
- Date of birth: November 7, 1992 (age 34)
- Place of birth: Cali, Colombia
- Height: 1.76 m (5 ft 9 in)
- Position: Attacking midfielder

Senior career*
Years	Team	Apps	(Gls)
2011–2012	Atlético	12	(0)
2013–2015	Cortuluá	22	(3)
2015–2016	Envigado	24	(2)
2016	Atlético Huila	10	(0)
2017	Once Caldas	18	(0)
2018	Penn FC	8	(1)
2018–2019	Ararat-Armenia	1	(0)
2019	Tauro	8	(0)
- * Club domestic league appearances and goals as of 18:46, 18 January 2020 (UTC)

Jerry Alberto Ortíz Cortés (born 7 November 1992) is a Colombian footballer who last played for Tauro.

== Career ==
On 28 February 2018, Ortiz signed with USL side Penn FC. Prior to his move to the United States, Ortiz had played with Atlético, Cortuluá, Envigado, Atlético Huila and Once Caldas.

On 9 January 2019, Ortiz left Ararat-Armenia by mutual consent.
