= Vladislav Oslonovsky =

Russian footballer

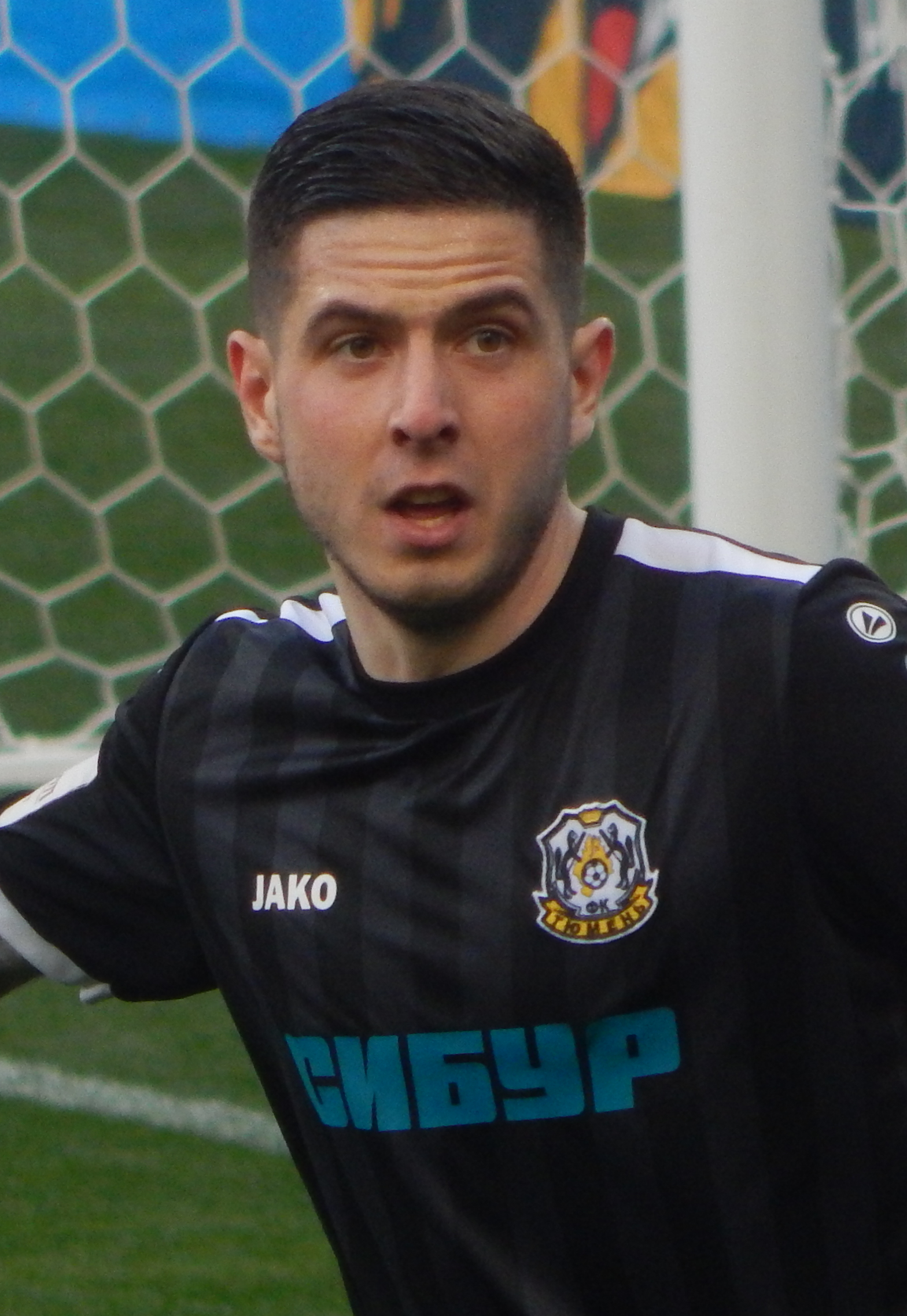

Personal information
- Full name: Vladislav Dmitriyevich Oslonovsky
- Date of birth: 15 January 1995 (age 31)
- Place of birth: Omsk, Russia
- Height: 1.79 m (5 ft 10 in)
- Position: Midfielder

Youth career
- –2005: Dynamo Omsk
- 2006: CSKA Moscow
- 2006–2008: Spartak Moscow
- 2008: DYuSSh Timiryazevets Moscow
- 2008–2010: Benfica
- 2010–2013: Spartak Moscow

Senior career*
Years	Team	Apps	(Gls)
2013–2014	Volga Ulyanovsk	13	(0)
2014	Istra 1961	0	(0)
2015	Teteks	13	(1)
2015–2016	Dynamo Saint Petersburg	16	(0)
2016–2017	Shinnik Yaroslavl	25	(0)
2017	Zenit Penza	17	(3)
2018	Chayka Peschanokopskoye	14	(3)
2018	Ararat-Armenia	10	(1)
2019	Tyumen	4	(0)
2019–2021	Luki-Energiya Velikiye Luki	40	(6)
2021–2022	Nosta Novotroitsk	6	(0)
2022–2025	2DROTS Moscow		

International career
2010	Russia U-15	2	(1)
- * Club domestic league appearances and goals as of 4 June 2022

Vladislav Dmitriyevich Oslonovsky (Russian: Владислав Дмитриевич Ослоновский; born 15 January 1995) is a Russian football midfielder.

== Club career ==
He started playing in the youth teams of Portuguese club Benfica and Russian Spartak Moscow.

He made his debut in the Russian Second Division for Volga Ulyanovsk on 21 April 2013 in a game against Oktan Perm.

He made his Russian Football National League debut for FC Shinnik Yaroslavl on 11 July 2016 in a game against FC Baltika Kaliningrad.

== Personal life ==
On July 15, 2024, Oslonovsky proposed to his girlfriend Aleksandra during a halftime break in the MFL's final. They got married on October 10.
