= Ivaylo Dimitrov (footballer, born 1989) =

Bulgarian footballer

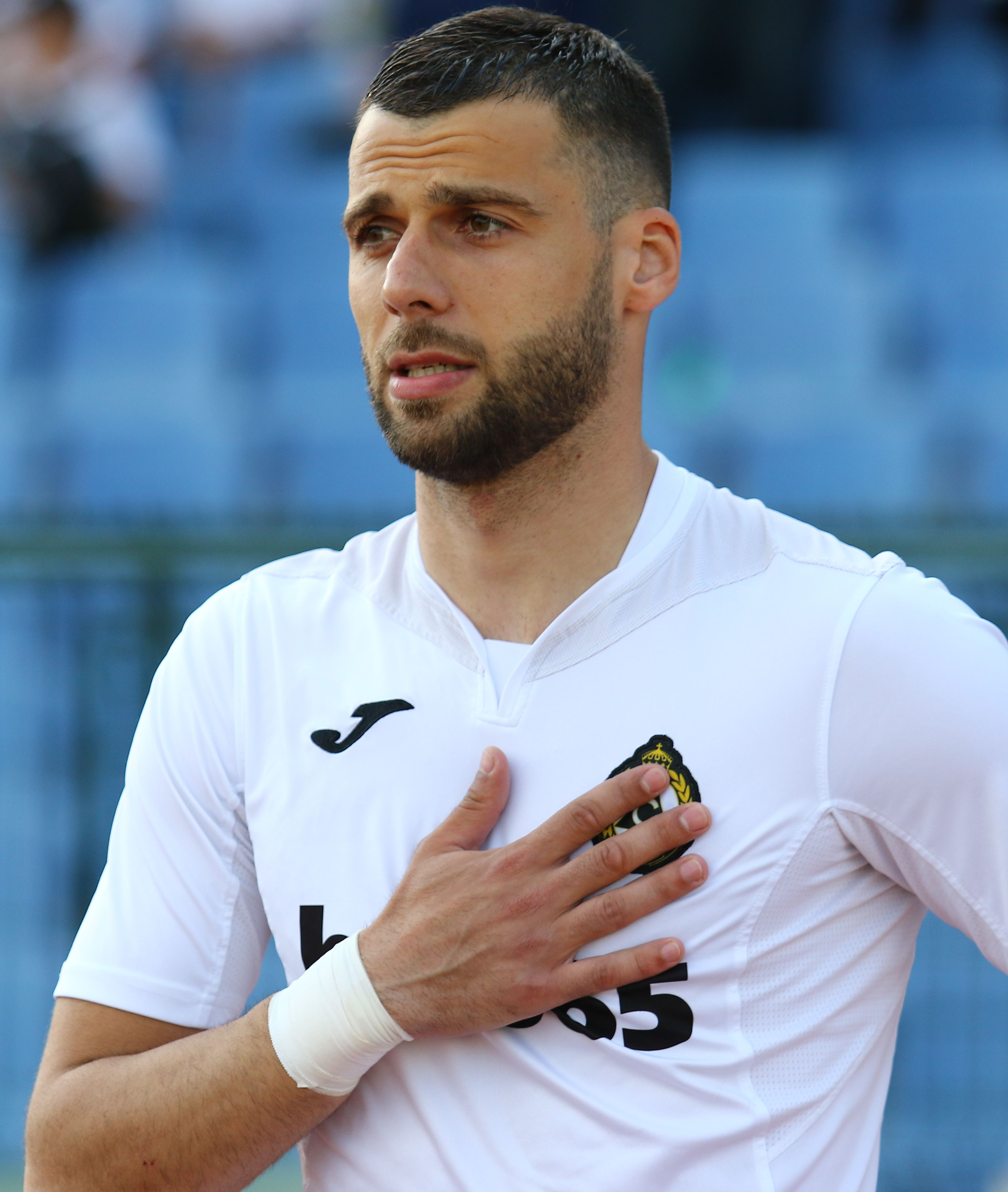

Personal information
- Full name: Ivaylo Emilov Dimitrov
- Date of birth: 26 March 1989 (age 37)
- Place of birth: Sofia, Bulgaria
- Height: 1.86 m (6 ft 1 in)
- Positions: Winger; forward

Senior career*
Years	Team	Apps	(Gls)
2008–2010	CSKA Sofia	1	(0)
2008–2010	→ Sportist Svoge (loan)	24	(2)
2010–2011	Akademik Sofia	17	(1)
2011	Etar 1924	9	(1)
2012	Nesebar	12	(1)
2012–2014	Dobrudzha	71	(21)
2015–2018	Slavia Sofia	88	(24)
2018–2019	Ararat-Armenia	17	(10)
2019	→ Zhetysu (loan)	6	(0)
2019	Arda Kardzhali	0	(0)
2019	→ Etar Veliko Tarnovo (loan)	11	(0)
2020–2021	Slavia Sofia	27	(6)
2021	Minyor Pernik	17	(1)
2022–2023	Lokomotiv Plovdiv	26	(2)
2023–2024	Etar Veliko Tarnovo	22	(2)
Total		348	(71)

International career
2017	Bulgaria	2	(0)
- * Club domestic league appearances and goals

Ivaylo Emilov Dimitrov (Bulgarian: Ивайло Емилов Димитров; born 26 March 1989) is a Bulgarian former professional footballer who played as a winger or forward.

== Club career ==
Dimitrov started playing football in CSKA Sofia's youth academy. On 23 July 2018, he moved abroad for the first time, signing with Armenian club FC Ararat-Armenia for two years. In July 2023, Dimitrov joined newly promoted Etar Veliko Tarnovo.

== International career ==
On 21 August 2017, Dimitrov was selected for the first time to the Bulgaria senior team by manager Petar Hubchev ahead of 2018 FIFA World Cup qualifiers against Sweden and Netherlands. He made his debut ten days later against Sweden as an 83rd-minute substitute for Ivelin Popov in a 3–2 win.

== Career statistics ==
=== Club ===
As of match played 12 February 2022

Appearances and goals by club, season and competition
Club	Season	League		Cup		Continental		Other (Note: Includes Bulgarian Supercup.)		Total	
Club	Season	Apps	Goals	Apps	Goals	Apps	Goals	Apps	Goals	Apps	Goals
Slavia Sofia	2014–15	4	1	—		—		—		4	1
Slavia Sofia	2015–16	34	7	—		—		—		34	7
Slavia Sofia	2016–17	24	9	—		2	0	—		26	9
Slavia Sofia	2017–18	30	11	4	3	—		—		34	14
Slavia Sofia	2018–19	0	0	0	0	0	0	0	0	0	0
Etar Veliko Tarnovo (loan)	2019–20	11	0	0	0	0	0	0	0	11	0
Slavia Sofia	2019–20	6	2	0	0	0	0	0	0	6	2
Slavia Sofia	2020–21	10	2	0	0	0	0	0	0	10	2
Lokomotiv Plovdiv	2021–22	4	0	0	0	0	0	0	0	4	0
Lokomotiv Plovdiv	2022–23	14	1	0	0	0	0	0	0	14	1
Total		92	28	4	3	2	0	–|		98	31

=== International ===
Appearances and goals by national team and year
National team	Year	Apps	Goals
Bulgaria	2017	2	0
Bulgaria	2018	0	0
Total		2	0

== Honours ==
CSKA Sofia

- Bulgarian League: 2007–08

Slavia Sofia

- Bulgarian Cup: 2017–18
