= Giovanny Martínez =

Colombian footballer (born 1989)

Personal information
- Full name: Giovanny Martínez Cortés
- Date of birth: 7 July 1989 (age 37)
- Place of birth: Cali, Colombia
- Height: 1.75 m (5 ft 9 in)
- Position: Midfielder

Team information
- Current team: Rionegro Águilas
- Number: 6

Senior career*
Years	Team	Apps	(Gls)
2011	Deportes Quindío	12	(0)
2012–2013	Universitario Popayán	39	(5)
2013	América de Cali	22	(1)
2014	Uniautónoma	12	(1)
2014–2015	Alianza Petrolera	6	(0)
2015	Deportivo Pasto	19	(0)
2016–2017	Sport Huancayo	34	(0)
2017	Cortuluá	14	(1)
2018	Deportivo Pasto	16	(0)
2018–2019	Ararat-Armenia	25	(1)
2019–	Rionegro Águilas	8	(1)
- * Club domestic league appearances and goals as of 28 November 2019

Giovanny Martínez Cortés (born 7 July 1989) is a Colombian professional footballer who plays as a midfielder for Rionegro Águilas.

== Career ==
=== Club ===
Martínez left FC Ararat-Armenia on 20 June 2019 by mutual consent.
