= Danila Yashchuk =

Russian footballer

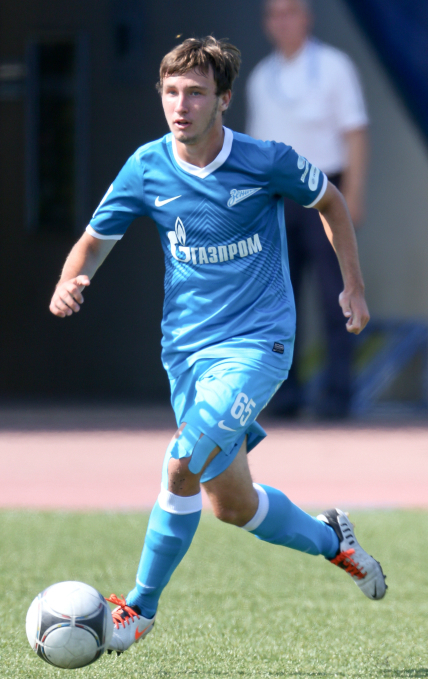
- Yashchuk with Zenit in 2013

Personal information
- Full name: Danila Sergeyevich Yashchuk
- Date of birth: 13 March 1995 (age 31)
- Place of birth: Kaliningrad, Russia
- Height: 1.81 m (5 ft 11 in)
- Position: Left winger

Youth career
- Smena-Zenit

Senior career*
Years	Team	Apps	(Gls)
2012–2017	Zenit St. Petersburg	1	(0)
2013–2017	Zenit-2 St. Petersburg	92	(12)
2017	Kuban Krasnodar	0	(0)
2018	Volgar	5	(1)
2018	Ararat-Armenia	2	(0)
2019–2020	AC Kajaani	12	(0)
2020–2022	Zvezda St. Petersburg	36	(4)
2022–2023	Dynamo St. Petersburg	11	(1)
2023	Yadro St. Petersburg	7	(2)

International career
2011	Russia U-16	8	(0)
2011–2012	Russia U-17	12	(3)
2013	Russia U-18	2	(0)
2013–2014	Russia U-19	9	(1)
2015	Russia U-21	6	(0)
- * Club domestic league appearances and goals

Danila Sergeyevich Yashchuk (Russian: Данила Серге́евич Ящук; born 13 March 1995) is a Russian former professional football player.

== Club career ==
He made his debut in the Russian Premier League on 26 May 2013 for FC Zenit Saint Petersburg in a game against FC Amkar Perm.
