= Charles Monsalvo =

Colombian footballer (born 1990)

Personal information
- Full name: Charles Junior Monsalvo Peralta
- Date of birth: 26 May 1990 (age 36)
- Place of birth: Santa Marta, Colombia
- Height: 1.84 m (6 ft 0 in)
- Position: Forward

Team information
- Current team: Sport Huancayo
- Number: 20

Senior career*
Years	Team	Apps	(Gls)
2008	Envigado	12	(1)
2009–2011	Boyacá Chico	62	(19)
2010–2011	→ Rosario Central (loan)	2	(0)
2012–2014	Deportes Tolima	45	(20)
2015	Medellín	11	(3)
2015–2016	Celaya	27	(6)
2017	América de Cali	6	(0)
2017	Rionegro Águilas	13	(0)
2018	Sport Huancayo	6	(1)
2018	Ararat-Armenia	9	(1)
2019	Al-Kharaitiyat	6	(0)
2020–	Sport Huancayo	1	(0)
- * Club domestic league appearances and goals as of 19:02, 9 May 2020 (UTC)

Charles Monsalvo (born May 26, 1990) is a Colombian professional footballer who plays as a forward for Sport Huancayo.

== Career ==
=== Club career ===
In December 2018, Monsalvo left Ararat-Armenia by mutual consent. In February 2020, he then moved to Qatar and signed with Al Kharaitiyat SC.

In December 2019, he returned to Peru and signed with Sport Huancayo, the club he played for in the 2018 season.
