= List of Armenian football transfers winter 2021–22 =

This is a list of Armenian football transfers in the winter transfer window, by club. Only clubs of the 2021–22 Armenian Premier League are included.

== Armenian Premier League 2021–22 ==
=== Alashkert ===
In: Note: Flags indicate national team as defined under FIFA eligibility rules; some limited exceptions apply. Players may hold more than one non-FIFA nationality.

No.	Pos.	Nation	Player
4	DF	RUS	Dmitry Guz (from (Kazakhstan) Atyrau)
8	DF	ARM	Gagik Daghbashyan (from (Armenia) Van)
9	FW	ARM	Aleksandr Karapetyan (from (Armenia) Noah)
33	DF	ARM	Andranik Voskanyan (from (Armenia) Van)
77	FW	KAZ	Alexey Rodionov (from (Kazakhstan) Atyrau)
85	FW	ARM	Alexander Ter-Tovmasyan (from (Armenia) Pyunik)
95	MF	BRA	Vitinho (from (Armenia) Urartu)
99	DF	ARM	Vahagn Ayvazyan (from (Armenia) Van)
—	MF	RUS	Manvel Agaronyan (from (Russia) Luki-Energiya Velikiye Luki)

Out: Note: Flags indicate national team as defined under FIFA eligibility rules; some limited exceptions apply. Players may hold more than one non-FIFA nationality.

No.	Pos.	Nation	Player
1	GK	ARM	David Yurchenko (to (Armenia) Pyunik)
4	DF	SRB	Mihailo Jovanović (to (Uzbekistan) Dinamo Samarqand)
8	MF	BRA	Lucas Serra
9	MF	ARM	Rumyan Hovsepyan (to (Malta) Floriana)
10	FW	BIH	Aleksandar Glišić (to (Uzbekistan) Dinamo Samarqand)
16	MF	FRA	Vincent Bezecourt (to (Singapore) Geylang International)
33	DF	MNE	Dejan Boljević (to (Czech Republic) Teplice)
55	DF	RUS	Vladislav Kryuchkov (to (Russia) Forte Taganrog)
77	FW	ARM	Grigor Aghekyan
85	FW	BRA	Matheus Alessandro (to (Brazil) Boavista)
95	MF	SRB	Marko Milinković
98	FW	SRB	Branko Mihajlović

=== Ararat-Armenia ===
In: Note: Flags indicate national team as defined under FIFA eligibility rules; some limited exceptions apply. Players may hold more than one non-FIFA nationality.

No.	Pos.	Nation	Player
8	MF	COL	Jonathan Duarte (from (Colombia) Orsomarso)
30	DF	BRA	Romércio (from (Brazil) Remo)
35	MF	ARM	Solomon Udo (from (Kazakhstan) Shakhter Karagandy)
—	DF	BEL	Thibaut Lesquoy (from (Netherlands) Almere City)

Out: Note: Flags indicate national team as defined under FIFA eligibility rules; some limited exceptions apply. Players may hold more than one non-FIFA nationality.

No.	Pos.	Nation	Player
4	DF	ARM	Albert Khachumyan (loan to (Armenia) BKMA Yerevan)
13	GK	ARM	Vardan Shahatuni (to (Armenia) Noah)
94	MF	MDA	Dan Spătaru (to (Armenia) Noah)

=== Ararat Yerevan ===
In: Note: Flags indicate national team as defined under FIFA eligibility rules; some limited exceptions apply. Players may hold more than one non-FIFA nationality.

No.	Pos.	Nation	Player
77	MF	ARM	Grigor Muradyan (loan return from (Armenia) BKMA Yerevan)

Out: Note: Flags indicate national team as defined under FIFA eligibility rules; some limited exceptions apply. Players may hold more than one non-FIFA nationality.

No.	Pos.	Nation	Player
8	DF	ARM	Zhirayr Margaryan (to (Ukraine) Veres Rivne)
10	FW	CIV	Serges Déblé (to (Armenia) Pyunik)
17	FW	CIV	Yacouba Silue (to (Austria) SKN St. Pölten)
55	MF	SRB	Dimitrije Pobulić (to (Uzbekistan) Bunyodkor)

=== BKMA Yerevan ===
In: Note: Flags indicate national team as defined under FIFA eligibility rules; some limited exceptions apply. Players may hold more than one non-FIFA nationality.

No.	Pos.	Nation	Player
—	DF	ARM	Albert Khachumyan (loan from Ararat-Armenia)
—	DF	ARM	Erik Simonyan (loan from (Armenia) Urartu)
—	MF	ARM	Edgar Movsesyan (loan from (Armenia) Pyunik)
—	MF	ARM	Tigran Sargsyan (loan from (Armenia) Noah)

Out: Note: Flags indicate national team as defined under FIFA eligibility rules; some limited exceptions apply. Players may hold more than one non-FIFA nationality.

No.	Pos.	Nation	Player
2	DF	ARM	Erik Piloyan (loan return to (Armenia) Urartu)
4	DF	ARM	Arman Ghazaryan (loan return to (Armenia) Urartu)
13	MF	ARM	Hayk Ghevondyan (loan return to (Armenia) Urartu)
17	DF	ARM	Radik Sargsyan (loan return to (Armenia) Urartu)
—	MF	ARM	Grigor Muradyan (loan return to (Armenia) Ararat Yerevan)

=== Noah ===
In: Note: Flags indicate national team as defined under FIFA eligibility rules; some limited exceptions apply. Players may hold more than one non-FIFA nationality.

No.	Pos.	Nation	Player
3	DF	ARM	Artur Kartashyan (from (Armenia) Sevan)
5	DF	BLR	Ilya Udodov (from (Belarus) Dnepr Mogilev)
6	FW	BLR	Hayk Musakhanyan (from (Belarus) Energetik-BGU Minsk)
7	MF	ARM	Gevorg Tarakhchyan (from (Armenia) Sevan)
13	DF	BFA	Dramane Salou (from (Burkina Faso) Salitas)
16	MF	MAR	Tarek Afqir (from (Romania) Șomuz Fălticeni)
21	FW	RUS	Dmitri Lavrishchev (from (Belarus) Lokomotiv Gomel)
23	MF	LVA	Aleksejs Grjaznovs (from (Czech Republic) Slovan Velvary)
32	MF	MDA	Evgheni Oancea (from (Moldova) Sfîntul Gheorghe)
77	GK	ARM	Vardan Shahatuni (from Ararat-Armenia)
94	MF	MDA	Dan Spătaru (from Ararat-Armenia)
—	GK	ARM	Artur Miroyan
—	DF	MDA	Alexei Ciopa (from (Moldova) Zimbru Chișinău)
—	DF	RUS	Grigori Trufanov (from (Russia) SKA-Khabarovsk)

Out: Note: Flags indicate national team as defined under FIFA eligibility rules; some limited exceptions apply. Players may hold more than one non-FIFA nationality.

No.	Pos.	Nation	Player
1	GK	RUS	Nikolay Novikov (loan return to (Russia) Rodina Moscow)
5	DF	RUS	Igor Smirnov (to (Russia) Zvezda St.Petersburg)
7	MF	LVA	Eduards Emsis (to (Finland) Lahti)
10	MF	ARM	Benik Hovhannisyan (to (Armenia) Van)
12	DF	RUS	Aleksandr Golovnya (loan return to (Russia) Rodina Moscow)
13	FW	RUS	Pavel Kireyenko (to (Kazakhstan) Caspiy)
18	MF	ARM	Tigran Sargsyan (loan to (Armenia) BKMA Yerevan)
21	MF	MDA	Vadim Paireli (to (Moldova) Sfîntul Gheorghe)
27	DF	BRA	Jefferson
69	MF	UKR	Denys Dedechko (to (Estonia) Narva Trans)
71	MF	RUS	Artem Filippov
87	FW	ARM	Aleksandr Karapetyan (to (Armenia) Alashkert)
88	MF	SRB	Dobrivoje Velemir (to (Serbia) Tekstilac Odžaci)
96	MF	ARM	Petros Avetisyan (to (Kazakhstan) Shakhter Karagandy)
98	GK	RUS	Pavel Ovchinnikov

=== Noravank ===
In: Note: Flags indicate national team as defined under FIFA eligibility rules; some limited exceptions apply. Players may hold more than one non-FIFA nationality.

No.	Pos.	Nation	Player
1	GK	ARM	Henri Avagyan
9	FW	RUS	Yevgeni Kobzar
12	GK	RUS	Daniil Yarusov (from (Russia) Chayka Peschanokopskoye)
15	FW	NGA	Tenton Yenne (from (Slovakia) MŠK Žilina)
17	FW	NGA	Shuaibu Ibrahim (from (Norway) Jerv)
18	MF	GAM	Babou Cham (from (Armenia) Sevan)
21	DF	ARM	Artur Avagyan (from (Armenia) Sevan)
22	DF	KAZ	Timur Rudoselsky (from (Armenia) Sevan)
88	MF	ARM	Aram Kocharyan (from (Armenia) Pyunik)

Out: Note: Flags indicate national team as defined under FIFA eligibility rules; some limited exceptions apply. Players may hold more than one non-FIFA nationality.

No.	Pos.	Nation	Player
6	MF	ARM	David Margaryan
9	FW	GHA	Benjamin Techie (loan return to (Ghana) Cheetah)
15	MF	GHA	David Quaye (loan return to (Ghana) Cheetah)
16	GK	RUS	Vladislav Yarukov
19	MF	GHA	Christian Boateng (loan return to (Ghana) Cheetah)
22	FW	GHA	Gideon Boateng (loan return to (Ghana) Cheetah)
24	DF	MNE	Igor Zonjić
35	GK	SRB	Dusan Cubrakovic
95	FW	RUS	Artur Sokhiyev

=== Pyunik ===
In: Note: Flags indicate national team as defined under FIFA eligibility rules; some limited exceptions apply. Players may hold more than one non-FIFA nationality.

No.	Pos.	Nation	Player
1	GK	ARM	David Yurchenko (from (Armenia) Alashkert)
8	FW	CIV	Serges Déblé (from (Armenia) Ararat Yerevan)
9	MF	ARM	Artak Dashyan (from (Kazakhstan) Atyrau)
13	MF	KAZ	Gevorg Najaryan (from (Kazakhstan) Shakhter Karagandy)
20	FW	BRA	Thiago Galvão
26	MF	VEN	Renzo Zambrano (from (United States) Portland Timbers)
29	MF	MDA	Eugeniu Cociuc (from (Moldova) Zimbru Chișinău)
30	DF	VEN	Alexander González
70	FW	SRB	Uroš Nenadović (from (Kazakhstan) Taraz)

Out: Note: Flags indicate national team as defined under FIFA eligibility rules; some limited exceptions apply. Players may hold more than one non-FIFA nationality.

No.	Pos.	Nation	Player
1	GK	ARM	Sevak Aslanyan
8	DF	ARM	Aram Kocharyan (to (Armenia) Noravank)
9	FW	SRB	Lazar Jovanović (to (Serbia) Radnički Niš)
14	MF	ARM	Erik Vardanyan (loan return to (Russia) Sochi)
19	DF	ARM	Vaspurak Minasyan (loan to (Armenia) Van)
23	MF	ARM	Edgar Movsesyan (loan to (Armenia) BKMA Yerevan)
26	MF	BIH	Adnan Šećerović (to (Bosnia and Herzegovina) Sarajevo)
39	DF	ARM	Suren Harutyunyan
70	FW	VEN	José Balza (to (Venezuela) Carabobo)
80	DF	VEN	Rommell Ibarra
—	FW	ARM	Vrezh Chiloyan (loan to (Armenia) Gandzasar Kapan)
—	FW	ARM	Alexander Ter-Tovmasyan (to (Armenia) Alashkert)

=== Sevan ===
In: Note: Flags indicate national team as defined under FIFA eligibility rules; some limited exceptions apply. Players may hold more than one non-FIFA nationality.

No.	Pos.	Nation	Player

Out: Note: Flags indicate national team as defined under FIFA eligibility rules; some limited exceptions apply. Players may hold more than one non-FIFA nationality.

No.	Pos.	Nation	Player
1	GK	SRB	Marko Drobnjak (to (Serbia) Radnički Niš)
2	DF	ARM	Artur Danielyan (to (Greece) Panserraikos)
3	DF	ARM	Artur Kartashyan (to (Armenia) Noah)
4	MF	ARM	Davit Ayvazyan
5	DF	ARM	Vahe Muradyan
6	MF	ARM	Narek Aslanyan
7	FW	NGA	Olaoluwa Ojetunde
8	MF	BRA	André Mensalão (to (North Macedonia) Shkëndija)
9	FW	ARM	Mher Sahakyan
10	FW	ARM	Ghukas Poghosyan
11	MF	ARM	Gevorg Tarakhchyan (to (Armenia) Noah)
14	FW	GAM	Ebrima Jatta (to (United Arab Emirates) Al-Ittihad Kalba)
15	MF	NGA	Isah Aliyu
17	DF	NGA	Ibrahim Abubakar
18	MF	MKD	Filip Duranski (to (Albania) Egnatia)
19	FW	NGA	Bernard Ovoke
21	DF	ARM	Artur Avagyan (to (Armenia) Noravank)
22	MF	HAI	Bicou Bissainthe
25	DF	KAZ	Timur Rudoselsky (to (Armenia) Noravank)
28	FW	BRA	Claudir (to (Kuwait) Al-Yarmouk)
33	GK	ARM	Suren Aloyan
40	DF	BRA	Luiz Matheus (to (Lithuania) Jonava)
65	GK	POR	Diogo Figueiredo
77	MF	GAM	Babou Cham (to (Armenia) Noravank)
98	MF	SRB	Kosta Aleksić (to (Greece) Iraklis)

=== Urartu ===
In: Note: Flags indicate national team as defined under FIFA eligibility rules; some limited exceptions apply. Players may hold more than one non-FIFA nationality.

No.	Pos.	Nation	Player
6	DF	ARM	Arman Ghazaryan (loan return from (Armenia) BKMA Yerevan)
23	MF	ARM	Erik Vardanyan (from (Russia) Sochi)
—	DF	ARM	Erik Piloyan (loan return from (Armenia) BKMA Yerevan)
—	DF	ARM	Radik Sargsyan (loan return from (Armenia) BKMA Yerevan)
—	MF	ARM	Hayk Ghevondyan (loan return from (Armenia) BKMA Yerevan)
—	FW	UKR	Dmytro Khlyobas (from (Kazakhstan) Ordabasy)

Out: Note: Flags indicate national team as defined under FIFA eligibility rules; some limited exceptions apply. Players may hold more than one non-FIFA nationality.

No.	Pos.	Nation	Player
6	MF	COD	Peter Mutumosi
23	MF	BEL	Livio Milts (to (Cyprus) PAEEK)
33	MF	BRA	Vitinho (to (Armenia) Alashkert)
77	DF	ARM	Erik Simonyan (on loan to (Armenia) BKMA Yerevan)

=== Van ===
In: Note: Flags indicate national team as defined under FIFA eligibility rules; some limited exceptions apply. Players may hold more than one non-FIFA nationality.

No.	Pos.	Nation	Player
2	DF	ARM	Vaspurak Minasyan (loan from (Armenia) Pyunik)
3	DF	ECU	Silvio Gutierrez (from (Ecuador) Club Deportivo Estudiantes)
8	MF	GEO	Shota Gvazava (from (Belarus) Slutsk)
9	MF	GEO	Kakha Kakhabrishvili (from (Georgia (country)) Locomotive Tbilisi)
10	MF	ARM	Benik Hovhannisyan (from (Armenia) Noah)
11	MF	CIV	Ipehe Williams
18	MF	ARM	Narek Hovhannisyan (from Ararat-Armenia II)
22	GK	ITA	Domenico Coppola
35	FW	RSA	Jaisen Clifford (from (South Africa) Cape Town All Stars)
96	MF	ARM	Edvard Avagyan

Out: Note: Flags indicate national team as defined under FIFA eligibility rules; some limited exceptions apply. Players may hold more than one non-FIFA nationality.

No.	Pos.	Nation	Player
2	DF	CIV	Emile N'dri Koukou
3	DF	ARM	Andranik Voskanyan (to (Armenia) Alashkert)
5	MF	BRA	Bruno Miguel (to (Finland) Ekenäs IF)
8	DF	ARM	Gagik Daghbashyan (to (Armenia) Alashkert)
9	FW	ARM	Akhmed Jindoyan
10	MF	NGA	Ededem Essien
11	FW	KGZ	Ernist Batyrkanov (to (Kyrgyzstan) Abdysh-Ata Kant)
16	MF	BRA	Luis Menezes (to (Brazil) Brasil de Pelotas)
17	MF	CIV	Stéphane Adjouman
18	DF	ARM	Vahagn Ayvazyan (to (Armenia) Alashkert)
22	GK	UKR	Mykola Tsyhan (to (Russia) Lada-Tolyatti)
44	MF	RUS	Norik Mkrtchyan
99	FW	NGA	Pascal Chidi
