= 2021–22 Sevan FC season =

Sevan
2021-22 season
- Manager: Pambos Christodoulou
- Stadium: Sevan City Stadium
- Premier League: 4th
- Armenian Cup: First Round vs Van
- Top goalscorer: League: André Mensalão (6); All: André Mensalão (6)

The 2020–21 season is Sevan's first season in the Armenian Premier League.

== Season events ==
On 1 December, the Football Federation of Armenia Disciplinary Committee voted in favor to remove Sevan from the Armenian Premier League after they failed to turn up for two games in a row, against Alashkert and BKMA Yerevan. As a result, all of Sevan's results were excluded from the championship table.

== Squad ==
As of match played 6 November 2021

Number	Name	Nationality	Position	Date of birth (age)	Signed from	Signed in	Contract ends	Apps.	Goals
Goalkeepers
1	Marko Drobnjak	(Serbia)	GK	17 May 1995 (age 31)	Novi Pazar	2021		3	0
33	Suren Aloyan	(Armenia)	GK	10 August 1997 (age 29)	Ararat-Armenia	2020			
65	Diogo Figueiredo	(Portugal)	GK	21 March 2001 (age 25)	Rio Ave	2021		11	0
Defenders
2	Artur Danielyan	(Armenia)	DF	9 February 1998 (age 28)	Ararat Yerevan	2021		12	0
3	Artur Kartashyan	(Armenia)	DF	8 January 1997 (age 29)	Pyunik	2021		13	0
5	Vahe Muradyan	(Armenia)	DF	28 January 1998 (age 28)	Ararat Yerevan	2021			
17	Ibrahim Abubakar	(Nigeria)	DF	24 January 2000 (age 26)	Plateau United	2021		11	0
21	Artur Avagyan	(Armenia)	DF	4 July 1987 (age 39)	Lori	2021		8	0
25	Timur Rudoselsky	(Kazakhstan)	DF	21 December 1994 (age 31)	Kaisar	2021		13	0
40	Luiz Matheus	(Brazil)	DF	10 January 1993 (age 33)	Unattached	2021		10	0
Midfielders
4	Davit Ayvazyan	(Armenia)	MF	12 August 1999 (age 27)	Van	2021			
6	Narek Aslanyan	(Armenia)	MF	4 June 1996 (age 30)	Gandzasar Kapan	2021		0	0
8	André Mensalão	(Brazil)	MF	21 June 1990 (age 36)	Lori	2021		14	6
11	Gevorg Tarakhchyan	(Armenia)	MF	15 March 2002 (age 24)	Urartu	2021		10	1
15	Isah Aliyu	(Nigeria)	MF	30 September 2002 (age 23)	Plateau United	2021		4	0
18	Filip Duranski	(North Macedonia)	MF	17 July 1991 (age 35)	Sileks	2021		14	0
22	Bicou Bissainthe	(Haiti)	MF	15 March 1999 (age 27)	Real Hope	2021		11	1
77	Babou Cham	(The Gambia)	MF	3 March 1999 (age 27)	Real de Banjul	2021		14	1
98	Kosta Aleksić	(Serbia)	MF	9 March 1998 (age 28)	Inđija	2021		6	1
Forwards
7	Olaoluwa Ojetunde	(Nigeria)	FW	6 November 2002 (age 23)		2021		2	0
9	Mher Sahakyan	(Armenia)	FW	15 July 1995 (age 31)	Noah	2019			
10	Ghukas Poghosyan	(Armenia)	FW	6 February 1994 (age 32)	Lor1	2021		4	0
14	Ebrima Jatta	(The Gambia)	FW	10 January 2002 (age 24)	Real de Banjul	2021		13	2
19	Bernard Ovoke	(Nigeria)	FW	7 July 1997 (age 29)	Plateau United	2021		0	0
28	Claudir	(Brazil)	FW	6 August 1992 (age 34)	Lori	2021		14	3
Players away on loan
Players who left during the season

== Transfers ==
=== In ===
Date	Position	Nationality	Name	From	Fee	Ref.
16 June 2021	DF	(Armenia)	Artur Avagyan	Lori	Undisclosed	
16 June 2021	DF	(Armenia)	Artur Kartashyan	Pyunik	Undisclosed	
17 June 2021	FW	(Brazil)	Claudir	Lori	Undisclosed	
18 June 2021	MF	(Brazil)	André Mensalão	Lori	Undisclosed	
19 June 2021	DF	(Brazil)	Luiz Matheus	Unattached	Free	
21 June 2021	FW	(Armenia)	Ghukas Poghosyan	Lori	Undisclosed	
24 June 2021	DF	(Armenia)	Artur Danielyan	Ararat Yerevan	Undisclosed	
25 June 2021	GK	(Portugal)	Diogo Figueiredo	Rio Ave	Undisclosed	
28 June 2021	GK	(Serbia)	Marko Drobnjak	Novi Pazar	Undisclosed	
23 July 2021	MF	(The Gambia)	Babou Cham	Real de Banjul	Undisclosed	
23 July 2021	FW	(The Gambia)	Ebrima Jatta	Real de Banjul	Undisclosed	
28 July 2021	DF	(Kazakhstan)	Timur Rudoselsky	Kaisar	Undisclosed	
2 August 2021	DF	(Nigeria)	Ibrahim Abubakar	Plateau United	Undisclosed	
2 August 2021	MF	(North Macedonia)	Filip Duranski	Sileks	Undisclosed	
2 August 2021	MF	(Nigeria)	Isah Aliyu	Plateau United	Undisclosed	
2 August 2021	FW	(Nigeria)	Olaoluwa Ojetunde	Plateau United	Undisclosed	
2 August 2021	FW	(Nigeria)	Bernard Ovoke	Plateau United	Undisclosed	
5 August 2021	MF	(Haiti)	Bicou Bissainthe	Real Hope	Undisclosed	

=== Released ===
Date	Position	Nationality	Name	Joined	Date	Ref.
31 December 2021	GK	(Armenia)	Suren Aloyan			
31 December 2021	GK	(Portugal)	Diogo Figueiredo	Montalegre		
31 December 2021	GK	(Serbia)	Marko Drobnjak	Radnički Niš		
31 December 2021	DF	(Armenia)	Artur Avagyan	Noravank		
31 December 2021	DF	(Armenia)	Artur Danielyan	Panserraikos		
31 December 2021	DF	(Armenia)	Artur Kartashyan	Noah	1 January 2022	
31 December 2021	DF	(Armenia)	Vahe Muradyan	Armavir		
31 December 2021	DF	(Brazil)	Luiz Matheus	Jonava	1 March 2022	
31 December 2021	DF	(Kazakhstan)	Timur Rudoselsky	Noravank	19 February 2022	
31 December 2021	DF	(Nigeria)	Ibrahim Abubakar	Plateau United	31 March 2022	
31 December 2021	MF	(Armenia)	Narek Aslanyan			
31 December 2021	MF	(Armenia)	Davit Ayvazyan			
31 December 2021	MF	(Armenia)	Gevorg Tarakhchyan	Noah	1 January 2022	
31 December 2021	MF	(Brazil)	André Mensalão	Shkëndija		
31 December 2021	MF	(Haiti)	Bicou Bissainthe	Pacific	22 April 2022	
31 December 2021	MF	(The Gambia)	Babou Cham	Noravank	28 January 2022	
31 December 2021	MF	(North Macedonia)	Filip Duranski	Egnatia		
31 December 2021	MF	(Nigeria)	Isah Aliyu	Plateau United		
31 December 2021	MF	(Serbia)	Kosta Aleksić	Iraklis		
31 December 2021	FW	(Armenia)	Mher Sahakyan			
31 December 2021	FW	(Armenia)	Ghukas Poghosyan			
31 December 2021	FW	(Brazil)	Claudir	Al-Yarmouk		
31 December 2021	FW	(The Gambia)	Ebrima Jatta	Al-Ittihad Kalba		
31 December 2021	FW	(Nigeria)	Olaoluwa Ojetunde	Lernayin Artsakh		
31 December 2021	FW	(Nigeria)	Bernard Ovoke	Rivers United	21 March 2022	

== Friendlies ==
	v
(UTC+4)

== Competitions ==
=== Overall record ===
Competition	First match	Last match	Starting round	Final position	Record							
Competition	First match	Last match	Starting round	Final position	Pld	W	D	L	GF	GA	GD	Win %
Premier League	30 July 2021		Matchday 1		13	5	5	3	14	11	+3	38.46
Armenian Cup	17 September 2021	17 September 2021	First round	First round	1	0	1	0	2	2	+0	0.00
Total					14	5	6	3	16	13	+3	35.71

Last updated: 7 November 2021
Source: Competitions

=== Premier League ===
==== Results summary ====
Overall								Home						Away					
Pld	W	D	L	GF	GA	GD	Pts	W	D	L	GF	GA	GD	W	D	L	GF	GA	GD
13	5	5	3	14	11	+3	20	4	2	0	10	2	+8	1	3	3	4	9	−5

Last updated: 7 November 2021.
Source: See Results

==== Results by round ====
Round	1	2	3	4	5	6	7	8	9	10	11	12	13	14	15
Ground	H	A	H	H	A	H	A	H	A	A	H	A	A	H	A
Result	W	L	W	W	D	W	D	D	L	D	D	W	L	P	P
Position	3	5	4	3	3	3	3	3	4	4	4	4	4	4	4

Updated to match(es) played on 7 November 2021. Source: See Results
A = Away; H = Home; W = Win; D = Draw; L = Loss

==== Results ====
2 August 2021 1	Sevan	5–2	Van	Yerevan
17:00 (UTC+4)	Claudir 1'; A.Mensalão 31', 68', 84'; Kartashyan (yellow card) 34'; M.Sahakyan (yellow card) 36'; Jatta 79'	Report	Badoyan 21'; Stepanov (yellow card) 34'; Daghbashyan (yellow card) 38'; A.Jindoyan 47'	Stadium: Alashkert Stadium; Attendance: 0 Referee: Zaven Hovhannisyan

7 August 2021 2	Urartu	4–1	Sevan	Yerevan
20:00 (UTC+4)	A.Mensah (yellow card) 23'; N.Grigoryan 45'; Polyakov 62', 81'; Miranyan (yellow card) 74'; U.Iwu 79'	Report	Nirisarike 25' (o.g.); Rudoselsky (yellow card) 27'; B.Cham (yellow card) 36'; L.Matheus (yellow card) 45'	Stadium: Urartu Stadium; Attendance: 880; Referee: Artem Gasparyan

13 August 2021 3	Sevan	1–0	Noravank	Yerevan
17:00 (UTC+4)	Duranski (yellow card) 41'; Claudir (yellow card) 57'; A.Mensalão 89' (yellow card) 89'; D.Figueiredo (yellow card) 90'	Report	J.Ufuoma (yellow card) 21'; Ebert (yellow card) 48'; Zonjić (yellow card) 69'	Stadium: Alashkert Stadium; Attendance: 200; Referee: Henrik Nalbandyan

19 August 2021 4	Sevan	2–0	Ararat Yerevan	Yerevan
17:00 (UTC+4)	Rudoselsky 8'; Poghosyan (yellow card) 90+1'; Jatta 90+2'; Kartashyan (yellow card) 90+3'	Report	D.Pobulić (yellow card) 43'; J.Bravo (yellow card) 46'	Stadium: Alashkert Stadium; Attendance: 500; Referee: Zaven Hovhannisyan

23 August 2021 5	Alashkert	0–0	Sevan	Yerevan
17:00 (UTC+4)	A.Davoyan (yellow card) 7'; N.Tankov (yellow card) 24'; Kryuchkov (yellow card) 41'; Embaló (yellow card) 62'	Report	Duranski (yellow card) 57'; Kartashyan (yellow card) 62'; Rudoselsky (yellow card) 70'; A.Mensalão (yellow card) 84'	Stadium: Alashkert Stadium; Attendance: 400; Referee: Henrik Nalbandyan

13 September 2021 6	Sevan	2–0	BKMA Yerevan	Yerevan
16:30 (UTC+4)	A.Mensalão 12'; Claudir 67' (pen.); Duranski (yellow card) 70'	Report	A.Khamoyan (yellow card) 46'; N.Alaverdyan (yellow card) 50'	Stadium: Alashkert Stadium; Attendance: 150; Referee: Artur Safaryan

23 September 2021 7	Pyunik	0–0	Sevan	Yerevan
18:00 (UTC+4)	Šećerović (yellow card) 27'; Firmino (yellow card) 75'	Report	Claudir (yellow card) 36'; Bissainthe (yellow card) 45'; Danielyan (yellow card) 75'; Duranski (yellow card) 80'; I.Abubakar (yellow card) 83'	Stadium: Republican Stadium; Attendance: 100; Referee: Artem Gasparyan

29 September 2021 8	Sevan	0–0	Ararat-Armenia	Yerevan
16:30 (UTC+4)	Danielyan (yellow card) 25'; Rudoselsky (yellow card) 36'; Luiz Matheus (yellow card) 48'; Jatta (yellow card) 85' (yellow-red card) 86'; Aleksić (yellow card) 90+5'; M.Sahakyan (yellow card) 90+5'; Kartashyan (yellow card) 90+5'	Report	Eza (yellow card) 44'; Bueno (yellow card) 90+5'; Khachumyan (yellow card) 90+5'; Spătaru (yellow card) 90+5'; Terteryan (red card) 90+5'	Stadium: Alashkert Stadium; Attendance: 800; Referee: Ashot Ghaltakchyan

15 October 2021 9	Noah	2–1	Sevan	Yerevan
16:00 (UTC+4)	Kireyenko 29'; Avetisyan 73' (pen.); A.Oliveira (yellow card) 79'; I.Smirnov (yellow card) 85'	Report	Rudoselsky (yellow card) 15'; L.Matheus (yellow card) 30'; G.Tarakhchyan 90'; A.Avagyan (yellow card) 90'; Danielyan (red card) 90'	Stadium: FFA Academy Stadium; Referee: Artur Safaryan

22 October 2021 10	Van	0–0	Sevan	Charentsavan
15:00 (UTC+4)	E.Mireku (yellow card) 21'; Voskanyan (yellow card) 23'; J.Gaba (yellow card) 74'	Report	V.Muradyan (yellow card) 17'; L.Matheus (yellow card) 65'	Stadium: Charentsavan City Stadium; Attendance: 300; Referee: Zaven Hovhannisyan

26 October 2021 11	Sevan	0–0	Urartu	Yerevan
15:00 (UTC+4)	Rudoselsky (yellow card) 32'; B.Cham (yellow card) 67'; Kartashyan (yellow card) 90'	Report	Hakobyan (yellow card) 33'; U.Iwu (yellow card) 60'; Milts (red card) 85'; Ten (yellow card) 87'	Stadium: Alashkert Stadium; Attendance: 400; Referee: Henrik Nalbandyan

1 November 2021 12	Noravank	0–1	Sevan	Charentsavan
15:00 (UTC+4)	D.Minasyan (yellow card) 18'; A.Khachatryan (yellow card) 46'; A.Kocharyan (yellow card) 70'; Bashilov (yellow card) 90+4'	Report	Bissainthe (yellow card) 22' (goal) 90+1'; A.Avagyan (yellow card) 42'; Aleksić (yellow card) 69'; Luiz Matheus (red card) 90+6'	Stadium: Charentsavan City Stadium; Attendance: 30; Referee: Artem Gasparyan

7 November 2021 13	Ararat Yerevan	3–1	Sevan	Yerevan
15:00 (UTC+4)	D.Pobulić 9'; Prljević (yellow card) 21'; Déblé 24'; V.Yermakov (yellow card) 49'; J.Bravo (yellow card) 61'; Arakelyan 69'	Report	Duranski (yellow card) 53'; A.Mensalão (yellow card) 54'; Aleksić 59' (yellow card) 88'	Stadium: Republican Stadium; Attendance: 1,000; Referee: Artem Gasparyan

17 November 2021 14	Sevan	v	Alashkert	Sevan
14:00 (UTC+4)				Stadium: Sevan City Stadium
Note: Match postponed due to Sevan not arriving for the match.

26 November 2021 15	BKMA Yerevan	v	Sevan	Yerevan
(UTC+4)				Stadium: FFA Academy Stadium

3 December 2021 16	Sevan	v	Pyunik	Sevan
14:00 (UTC+4)				Stadium: Sevan City Stadium
Note: Sevan expelled from the league on 1 December 2021.

==== Table ====
Pos	Team	Pld	W	D	L	GF	GA	GD	Pts	Qualification or relegation
1	Pyunik (C)	32	23	6	3	52	25	+27	75	Qualification for the Champions League first qualifying round
2	Ararat-Armenia	32	23	5	4	56	20	+36	74	Qualification for the Europa Conference League second qualifying round (Note: The 2021–22 Armenian Cup winners, Noravank, did not obtain an UEFA license and was replaced.)
3	Alashkert	32	14	9	9	38	30	+8	51	Qualification for the Europa Conference League first qualifying round
4	Ararat Yerevan	32	13	7	12	47	36	+11	46	Qualification for the Europa Conference League first qualifying round
5	Urartu	32	9	13	10	37	32	+5	40	
6	Noah	32	9	12	11	38	43	−5	39	
7	Noravank	32	7	7	18	36	55	−19	28	
8	Van	32	6	7	19	19	47	−28	25	
9	BKMA (O)	32	4	6	22	25	60	−35	18	Qualification to the relegation play-offs
10	Sevan (D, R)	0	0	0	0	0	0	0	0	Relegation to the Armenian First League (Note: Sevan was expelled from the league on 1 December 2021.)

Source: FFA Soccerway
Rules for classification: 1) Points; 2) Head-to-head points; 3) Head-to-head goal difference; 4) Head-to-head goals scored; 5) Matches won; 6) Goal difference; 7) Less red cards; 8) Less yellow cards; 9) Fair-play ranking 10) Draw
(C) Champions; (D) Disqualified; (O) Play-off winners; (R) Relegated

=== Armenian Cup ===
17 September 2021 First Round	Van	2–2 (a.e.t.) (3–1 p)	Sevan	Charentsavan
15:30 (UTC+4)	Batyrkanov 44', 72'; D.Kuzkin (yellow card) 57'; A.Petrosyan (yellow card) 87'	Report	B.Cham 24'; Claudir 90' (pen.); A.Avagyan (yellow card) 117'; Kartashyan (yellow card) 119'	Stadium: Charentsavan City Stadium; Attendance: 400; Referee: Henrik Nalbandyan
	Penalties
	A.Petrosyan (penalty scored); Voskanyan (penalty missed); V.Ayvazyan (penalty scored); Bruno (penalty scored)		(penalty missed) A.Mensalão; (penalty scored) Duranski; (penalty missed) Kartashyan; (penalty missed) Bissainthe

== Statistics ==
As of match played 6 November 2021

=== Appearances and goals ===
No.	Pos	Nat	Player	Total		Premier League		Armenian Cup	
No.	Pos	Nat	Player	Apps	Goals	Apps	Goals	Apps	Goals
1	GK	(Serbia) SRB	Marko Drobnjak	3	0	2	0	1	0
2	DF	(Armenia) ARM	Artur Danielyan	12	0	12	0	0	0
3	DF	(Armenia) ARM	Artur Kartashyan	13	0	12	0	1	0
5	DF	(Armenia) ARM	Vahe Muradyan	8	0	3+4	0	1	0
7	FW	(Nigeria) NGA	Olaoluwa Ojetunde	2	0	0+1	0	0+1	0
8	MF	(Brazil) BRA	André Mensalão	14	6	13	6	0+1	0
9	FW	(Armenia) ARM	Mher Sahakyan	13	0	8+4	0	1	0
10	FW	(Armenia) ARM	Ghukas Poghosyan	4	0	4	0	0	0
11	MF	(Armenia) ARM	Gevorg Tarakhchyan	10	1	3+6	1	0+1	0
14	FW	(The Gambia) GAM	Ebrima Jatta	13	2	1+11	2	1	0
15	MF	(Nigeria) NGA	Isah Aliyu	4	0	0+3	0	1	0
17	DF	(Nigeria) NGA	Ibrahim Abubakar	11	0	9+1	0	1	0
18	MF	(North Macedonia) MKD	Filip Duranski	14	0	13	0	1	0
21	DF	(Armenia) ARM	Artur Avagyan	8	0	1+7	0	0	0
22	MF	(Haiti) HAI	Bicou Bissainthe	11	1	5+5	1	1	0
25	DF	(Kazakhstan) KAZ	Timur Rudoselsky	13	0	11+1	0	1	0
28	FW	(Brazil) BRA	Claudir	14	3	13	2	0+1	1
40	DF	(Brazil) BRA	Luiz Matheus	10	0	10	0	0	0
65	GK	(Portugal) POR	Diogo Figueiredo	11	0	11	0	0	0
77	MF	(The Gambia) GAM	Babou Cham	14	1	9+4	0	1	1
98	MF	(Serbia) SRB	Kosta Aleksić	6	1	3+2	1	0+1	0
Players away on loan:
Players who left Sevan during the season:

=== Goal scorers ===
Place	Position	Nation	Number	Name	Premier League	Armenian Cup	Total
1	MF	(Brazil)	8	André Mensalão	6	0	6
2	FW	(Brazil)	28	Claudir	2	1	3
3	FW	(The Gambia)	14	Ebrima Jatta	2	0	2
4	MF	(Haiti)	22	Bicou Bissainthe	1	0	1
4	MF	(Serbia)	98	Kosta Aleksić	1	0	1
4	MF	(Armenia)	11	Gevorg Tarakhchyan	1	0	1
4	MF	(The Gambia)	77	Babou Cham	0	1	1
4				Own goal	1	0	1
				TOTALS	14	2	16

=== Clean sheets ===
Place	Position	Nation	Number	Name	Premier League	Armenian Cup	Total
1	GK	(Portugal)	65	Diogo Figueiredo	9	0	9
				TOTALS	9	0	9

=== Disciplinary record ===
Number	Nation	Position	Name	Premier League		Armenian Cup		Total	
Number	Nation	Position	Name	Booked	Sent off (straight red)	Booked	Sent off (straight red)	Booked	Sent off (straight red)
2	(Armenia)	DF	Artur Danielyan	4	1	0	0	4	1
3	(Armenia)	DF	Artur Kartashyan	5	0	1	0	6	0
5	(Armenia)	DF	Vahe Muradyan	1	0	0	0	1	0
8	(Brazil)	MF	André Mensalão	3	0	0	0	3	0
9	(Armenia)	FW	Mher Sahakyan	2	0	0	0	2	0
10	(Armenia)	FW	Ghukas Poghosyan	1	0	0	0	1	0
14	(The Gambia)	FW	Ebrima Jatta	1	1	0	0	1	1
17	(Nigeria)	DF	Ibrahim Abubakar	1	0	0	0	1	0
18	(North Macedonia)	MF	Filip Duranski	5	0	0	0	5	0
21	(Armenia)	DF	Artur Avagyan	3	0	1	0	4	0
22	(Haiti)	MF	Bicou Bissainthe	2	0	0	0	2	0
25	(Kazakhstan)	DF	Timur Rudoselsky	5	0	0	0	5	0
28	(Brazil)	FW	Claudir	2	0	0	0	2	0
40	(Brazil)	DF	Luiz Matheus	6	1	0	0	6	1
65	(Portugal)	GK	Diogo Figueiredo	1	0	0	0	1	0
77	(The Gambia)	MF	Babou Cham	2	0	0	0	2	0
98	(Serbia)	MF	Kosta Aleksić	3	0	0	0	3	0
Players away on loan:
Players who left Sevan during the season:
			TOTALS	47	3	2	0	49	3
