= List of Armenian football transfers summer 2021 =

This is a list of Armenian football transfers in the summer transfer window, by club. Only clubs of the 2021–22 Armenian Premier League are included.

== Armenian Premier League 2021-22 ==
=== Alashkert ===
In: Note: Flags indicate national team as defined under FIFA eligibility rules; some limited exceptions apply. Players may hold more than one non-FIFA nationality.

No.	Pos.	Nation	Player
8	MF	BRA	Lucas Serra (from (Brazil) Canaã)
11	DF	ARM	Aghvan Davoyan (from (Armenia) Shirak)
15	FW	CIV	Béko Fofana (from (Serbia) IMT)
17	MF	ARM	Artak Yedigaryan (from (Armenia) Ararat Yerevan)
20	FW	POR	José Embaló (from (Poland) Olimpia Grudziądz)
27	MF	RUS	David Khurtsidze (from (Armenia) Ararat Yerevan)
55	DF	RUS	Vladislav Kryuchkov (from (Armenia) Noah)
70	MF	ARM	Aghvan Papikyan (from (Armenia) Ararat Yerevan)
88	DF	BRA	James (from (Armenia) Urartu)
—	DF	NGA	Deou Dosa (from (Armenia) Van)
—	MF	RUS	Levon Bayramyan (from (Russia) Krasnodar)

Out: Note: Flags indicate national team as defined under FIFA eligibility rules; some limited exceptions apply. Players may hold more than one non-FIFA nationality.

No.	Pos.	Nation	Player
8	DF	ARM	Gagik Daghbashyan (to (Armenia) Van)
11	MF	ARM	Davit Minasyan (to (Armenia) Noravank)
15	DF	ARM	Vaspurak Minasyan (to (Armenia) Pyunik)
19	MF	SEN	Pape Camara
20	FW	BRA	Thiago Galvão
25	GK	ARM	Gevorg Kasparov (Retired)
27	FW	ARM	Mihran Manasyan
88	FW	NGA	Sunday Ingbede

=== Ararat-Armenia ===
In: Note: Flags indicate national team as defined under FIFA eligibility rules; some limited exceptions apply. Players may hold more than one non-FIFA nationality.

No.	Pos.	Nation	Player
14	MF	CPV	Mailson Lima (from (United Arab Emirates) Dibba Al-Hisn)
18	FW	RUS	Artyom Avanesyan (loan return from (Armenia) Pyunik)
19	MF	ARM	Karen Muradyan (from (Armenia) Ararat Yerevan)
20	MF	KEN	Alwyn Tera (from (Georgia (country)) Saburtalo)
23	MF	ARM	Zhirayr Shaghoyan (loan return from (Armenia) BKMA Yerevan)
25	MF	ARM	Davit Nalbandyan (loan return from (Armenia) Van)
77	GK	ITA	Valerio Vimercati (from (Armenia) Noah)
88	FW	CIV	Wilfried Eza (from (Armenia) Van)

Out: Note: Flags indicate national team as defined under FIFA eligibility rules; some limited exceptions apply. Players may hold more than one non-FIFA nationality.

No.	Pos.	Nation	Player
3	DF	POR	Ângelo Meneses (to (Portugal) Rio Ave)
5	MF	ARM	Sargis Shahinyan (on loan to (Armenia) Noah)
6	DF	ESP	David Bollo
7	MF	SWE	Heradi Rashidi
9	FW	PER	Jeisson Martínez (to (Spain) Albacete)
21	DF	MKD	Aleksandar Damčevski (to (Albania) Partizani Tirana)
87	FW	ARM	Aleksandr Karapetyan (to (Armenia) Noah)
91	GK	SRB	Nikola Petrić (to (Serbia) Proleter Novi Sad)

=== Ararat Yerevan ===
In: Note: Flags indicate national team as defined under FIFA eligibility rules; some limited exceptions apply. Players may hold more than one non-FIFA nationality.

No.	Pos.	Nation	Player
2	DF	ARM	Robert Hakobyan (from (Armenia) Shirak)
6	MF	ARM	Erik Vardanyan (from (Armenia) Urartu)
7	MF	NGA	Isah Aliyu (from (Armenia) Urartu)
10	FW	CIV	Serges Déblé (from (Denmark) Viborg)
15	DF	ARM	Arsen Sadoyan (from (Armenia) Urartu)
17	FW	CIV	Yacouba Silue (from (Armenia) Shirak)
23	MF	ARM	Gor Malakyan (from (Armenia) Pyunik)
26	MF	ARM	Alik Arakelyan (from (Armenia) Pyunik)
27	MF	ARG	Iván Díaz (from (Slovakia) ŠKF Sereď)
99	DF	ARM	Robert Darbinyan (from (Armenia) Pyunik)

Out: Note: Flags indicate national team as defined under FIFA eligibility rules; some limited exceptions apply. Players may hold more than one non-FIFA nationality.

No.	Pos.	Nation	Player
2	DF	ESP	Christian Jiménez (to (Lithuania) Hegelmann Litauen)
7	MF	ARM	Aghvan Papikyan (to (Armenia) Alashkert)
10	MF	ARM	Zaven Badoyan (to (Armenia) Van)
16	MF	ARM	Serob Galstyan (loan to (Armenia) BKMA Yerevan)
17	MF	ARM	Artak Yedigaryan (to (Armenia) Alashkert)
19	MF	ARM	Karen Muradyan (to Ararat-Armenia)
22	DF	ARM	Artur Danielyan (to (Armenia) Sevan)
23	DF	UKR	Ivan Spychka
27	MF	RUS	David Khurtsidze (to (Armenia) Alashkert)
33	GK	ARM	Grigor Meliksetyan (to (Armenia) Pyunik)
70	FW	SRB	Uroš Nenadović (to (Kazakhstan) Taraz)
77	MF	ARM	Grigor Muradyan (loan to (Armenia) BKMA Yerevan)
80	MF	ARM	Seroj Titizian (to (Armenia) BKMA Yerevan)
94	MF	UKR	Maksym Zaderaka (to (Ukraine) Metalist 1925 Kharkiv)

=== BKMA Yerevan ===
In: Note: Flags indicate national team as defined under FIFA eligibility rules; some limited exceptions apply. Players may hold more than one non-FIFA nationality.

No.	Pos.	Nation	Player
—	DF	ARM	Erik Piloyan (loan from (Armenia) Urartu)
—	MF	ARM	Serob Galstyan (loan from (Armenia) Ararat Yerevan)
—	MF	ARM	Artur Grigoryan (loan from (Armenia) Pyunik)
—	MF	ARM	Grigor Muradyan (loan from (Armenia) Ararat Yerevan)
—	MF	ARM	Seroj Titizian (from (Armenia) Ararat Yerevan)

Out: Note: Flags indicate national team as defined under FIFA eligibility rules; some limited exceptions apply. Players may hold more than one non-FIFA nationality.

No.	Pos.	Nation	Player

=== Noah ===
In: Note: Flags indicate national team as defined under FIFA eligibility rules; some limited exceptions apply. Players may hold more than one non-FIFA nationality.

No.	Pos.	Nation	Player
5	DF	RUS	Igor Smirnov (from (Russia) Zvezda St.Petersburg)
8	MF	ARM	Sargis Shahinyan (on loan from Ararat-Armenia)
12	DF	RUS	Aleksandr Golovnya (loan from (Russia) Rodina Moscow)
18	MF	ARM	Tigran Sargsyan (from (Armenia) Pyunik)
25	MF	NGA	Charles Mark Ikechukwu (from West Armenia)
87	FW	ARM	Aleksandr Karapetyan (from Ararat-Armenia)
98	GK	RUS	Pavel Ovchinnikov (from (Russia) Veles Moscow)
99	GK	RUS	Grigori Matevosyan (from (Armenia) Urartu)
—	DF	ARM	Erik Avetisyan (from (Armenia) Pyunik)

Out: Note: Flags indicate national team as defined under FIFA eligibility rules; some limited exceptions apply. Players may hold more than one non-FIFA nationality.

No.	Pos.	Nation	Player
1	GK	ARM	Samvel Hunanyan
5	DF	RUS	Vladislav Kryuchkov (to (Armenia) Alashkert)
8	MF	ARM	Yuri Gareginyan (to (Armenia) Pyunik)
9	MF	RUS	Vladimir Azarov (to (Russia) Akron Tolyatti)
15	FW	RUS	Maksim Mayrovich (to (Russia) Akron Tolyatti, previously on loan)
16	MF	GNB	Helistano Manga
17	MF	RUS	Nikita Dubchak
23	DF	ARM	Artur Stepanyan
25	DF	RUS	Alan Tatayev
77	GK	ITA	Valerio Vimercati (to Ararat-Armenia)
78	MF	RUS	Maksim Danilin (loan return to (Russia) Spartak Moscow)
97	MF	RUS	Kirill Bor
99	DF	ARM	Arman Mkrtchyan (to (Armenia) Noravank)

=== Noravank ===
In: Note: Flags indicate national team as defined under FIFA eligibility rules; some limited exceptions apply. Players may hold more than one non-FIFA nationality.

No.	Pos.	Nation	Player
4	DF	RUS	Mikhail Bashilov (from (Belarus) Energetik-BGU Minsk)
7	MF	ARM	Andranik Kocharyan
8	MF	NGA	Julius Ufuoma (from (Armenia) Pyunik)
16	GK	RUS	Vladislav Yarukov (from (Russia) Dynamo-2 Moscow)
24	DF	MNE	Igor Zonjić (from (Serbia) Napredak Kruševac)
25	DF	BRA	Ebert (from (Ukraine) Metalist Kharkiv)
35	GK	SRB	Dusan Cubrakovic (from (Serbia) Zlatibor Čajetina)
37	FW	RUS	Sergei Orlov (from West Armenia)
63	DF	RUS	Temur Mustafin (from (Russia) Chernomorets Novorossiysk)
66	FW	ARM	Erik Petrosyan (from (Armenia) Sevan)
77	MF	ARM	Davit Minasyan (from (Armenia) Alashkert)
99	DF	ARM	Arman Mkrtchyan (from (Armenia) Noah)

Out: Note: Flags indicate national team as defined under FIFA eligibility rules; some limited exceptions apply. Players may hold more than one non-FIFA nationality.

No.	Pos.	Nation	Player
1	GK	ARM	Levon Ter-Minasyan
2	DF	ARM	Samvel Khanumyan
8	MF	ARM	Vigen Avetisyan
13	GK	ARM	Hovhannes Ayvazyan
14	MF	ARM	Vigen Begoyan
15	DF	ARM	Aram Shakhnazaryan
16	DF	ARM	Robert Marutyan
17	DF	ARM	Vardan Safaryan
30	MF	GHA	Mike Twumasi (loan return to (Ghana) Cheetah)
66	FW	ARM	David Ghandilyan
—	GK	ARM	Gor Martirosyan

=== Pyunik ===
In: Note: Flags indicate national team as defined under FIFA eligibility rules; some limited exceptions apply. Players may hold more than one non-FIFA nationality.

No.	Pos.	Nation	Player
3	DF	BRA	Bruno Nascimento (from (Bahrain) Al-Hidd)
5	DF	SRB	Zoran Gajić (from (Czech Republic) Zbrojovka Brno)
6	DF	BRA	Juninho
7	FW	POR	Hugo Firmino (from (Portugal) Cova da Piedade)
8	DF	ARM	Aram Kocharyan (from (Armenia) Lori)
12	GK	ARM	Grigor Meliksetyan (from (Armenia) Ararat Yerevan)
14	MF	ARM	Erik Vardanyan (loan from (Russia) Sochi)
18	DF	ARM	Hayk Ishkhanyan (from (Armenia) Shirak)
19	DF	ARM	Vaspurak Minasyan (from (Armenia) Alashkert)
21	FW	POR	Carlitos (from (Cyprus) Doxa Katokopias)
22	FW	ARM	Edgar Movsesyan (from (Armenia) Van)
26	MF	BIH	Adnan Šećerović (from (Latvia) Riga)
27	DF	EST	Nikita Baranov (from (Malta) Ħamrun Spartans)
88	MF	ARM	Yuri Gareginyan (from (Armenia) Noah)
99	FW	ARM	Gevorg Ghazaryan (from (Cyprus) AEL Limassol)

Out: Note: Flags indicate national team as defined under FIFA eligibility rules; some limited exceptions apply. Players may hold more than one non-FIFA nationality.

No.	Pos.	Nation	Player
3	DF	ARM	Artur Kartashyan (to (Armenia) Sevan)
5	MF	NGA	Julius Ufuoma (to (Armenia) Noravank)
6	MF	ARM	Norayr Ghazaryan (to Ararat-Armenia II)
7	MF	ARM	Erik Azizyan (loan to (Armenia) Van)
8	MF	ARM	Gor Malakyan (to (Armenia) Ararat Yerevan)
10	MF	ARM	Artur Grigoryan (loan to (Armenia) BKMA Yerevan)
12	MF	NGA	Muhammad Ladan (loan return to (Russia) Sochi)
13	MF	BFA	Dramane Salou
18	MF	ARM	Alik Arakelyan (to (Armenia) Ararat Yerevan)
19	FW	RUS	Artyom Avanesyan (loan return to Ararat-Armenia)
24	FW	UKR	Yevhen Budnik (to (Ukraine) Karpaty Lviv)
29	MF	UKR	Oleh Kozhushko (to (Ukraine) Oleksandriya)
69	DF	ARM	Robert Darbinyan (to (Armenia) Ararat Yerevan)
77	DF	UKR	Ihor Honchar (to (Ukraine) Mynai)
88	DF	UKR	Valeriy Boldenkov (to (Ukraine) Karpaty Lviv)
94	GK	UKR	Herman Penkov (to (Ukraine) Mynai)
99	FW	UKR	Mykyta Tatarkov (to (Ukraine) Kryvbas Kryvyi Rih)
—	DF	ARM	Erik Avetisyan (to (Armenia) Noah)
—	MF	ARM	Tigran Sargsyan (to (Armenia) Noah)

=== Sevan ===
In: Note: Flags indicate national team as defined under FIFA eligibility rules; some limited exceptions apply. Players may hold more than one non-FIFA nationality.

No.	Pos.	Nation	Player
1	GK	SRB	Marko Drobnjak (from (Serbia) Novi Pazar)
2	DF	ARM	Artur Danielyan (from (Armenia) Ararat Yerevan)
3	DF	ARM	Artur Kartashyan (from (Armenia) Pyunik)
7	FW	NGA	Olaoluwa Ojetunde (from (Nigeria) Plateau United)
8	MF	BRA	André Mensalão
10	FW	ARM	Ghukas Poghosyan
14	DF	GAM	Ebrima Jatta (from (The Gambia) Real de Banjul)
15	MF	NGA	Isah Aliyu (from (Nigeria) Plateau United)
17	FW	NGA	Ibrahim Abubakar (from (Nigeria) Plateau United)
18	MF	MKD	Filip Duranski (from (Slovakia) Sereď)
19	FW	NGA	Bernard Ovoke (from (Nigeria) Plateau United)
21	DF	ARM	Artur Avagyan
22	MF	HAI	Bicou Bissainthe (from (Haiti) Real Hope)
25	DF	KAZ	Timur Rudoselsky (from (Kazakhstan) Kaisar)
26	FW	BRA	Claudir
40	DF	BRA	Luiz Matheus
65	GK	POR	Diogo Figueiredo (from (Portugal) Rio Ave)
77	MF	GAM	Babou Cham (from (The Gambia) Real de Banjul)
—	MF	ARM	Gevorg Tarakhchyan (from (Armenia) Urartu)

Out: Note: Flags indicate national team as defined under FIFA eligibility rules; some limited exceptions apply. Players may hold more than one non-FIFA nationality.

No.	Pos.	Nation	Player
4	MF	ARM	Hovhannes Poghosyan
5	DF	ARM	Artyom Khachaturov
7	MF	ARM	Aram Sargsyan
8	FW	ARM	Erik Petrosyan
9	FW	EQG	Salomón Obama (to (Spain) CD Móstoles URJC)
10	FW	ARM	Areg Azatyan
11	DF	ARM	Gegham Tumbaryan
12	GK	ARM	Edvin Hakobyan
14	DF	ARM	Pargev Abrahamyan
15	MF	ARM	Daniel Petoyan
17	FW	ARM	Robert Minasyan
18	FW	NGA	Francis Nwankwo
19	DF	ARM	Arman Manukyan
22	FW	ARM	Akhmed Jindoyan
23	MF	MDA	Constantin Mandrîcenco (to (Moldova) Florești)
26	DF	ARM	Hovik Nersesyan
27	DF	RUS	Aleksandr Kalyashin (to (Russia) Zenit Penza)
80	MF	LTU	Edvinas Kloniūnas (to (Lithuania) Kauno Žalgiris)

=== Urartu ===
In: Note: Flags indicate national team as defined under FIFA eligibility rules; some limited exceptions apply. Players may hold more than one non-FIFA nationality.

No.	Pos.	Nation	Player
2	DF	GHA	Nana Antwi (from (Armenia) Lori)
9	MF	ARM	Narek Aghasaryan (loan return from (Armenia) BKMA Yerevan)
19	MF	ARM	Sergey Mkrtchyan (loan return from (Armenia) BKMA Yerevan)
21	MF	ARM	Narek Grigoryan (loan return from (Armenia) BKMA Yerevan)
23	DF	BEL	Livio Milts (from (Netherlands) Roda JC Kerkrade)
95	DF	ARM	Vardan Arzoyan (from (Armenia) Shirak)
—	DF	ARM	Armen Manucharyan

Out: Note: Flags indicate national team as defined under FIFA eligibility rules; some limited exceptions apply. Players may hold more than one non-FIFA nationality.

No.	Pos.	Nation	Player
9	FW	RUS	Yevgeni Kobzar
11	MF	ARM	Gevorg Tarakhchyan (to (Armenia) Sevan)
23	DF	ARM	Narek Petrosyan
31	GK	RUS	Grigori Matevosyan (to (Armenia) Noah)
34	DF	ARM	Erik Piloyan (on loan to (Armenia) BKMA Yerevan)
38	MF	NGA	Isah Aliyu (to (Armenia) Ararat Yerevan)
88	DF	BRA	James (to (Armenia) Alashkert)
—	DF	ARM	Hrachya Geghamyan (released, previously on loan to (Armenia) Shirak)
—	DF	ARM	Arsen Sadoyan (to (Armenia) Ararat Yerevan, previously on loan to (Armenia) Shirak)
—	MF	ARM	Erik Vardanyan (to (Armenia) Ararat Yerevan, previously on loan to (Armenia) Shirak)

=== Van ===
In: Note: Flags indicate national team as defined under FIFA eligibility rules; some limited exceptions apply. Players may hold more than one non-FIFA nationality.

No.	Pos.	Nation	Player
5	DF	BRA	Bruno Miguel
7	MF	RUS	Vladimir Filippov (from (Russia) Zvezda St.Petersburg)
8	DF	ARM	Gagik Daghbashyan (from (Armenia) Alashkert)
11	FW	KGZ	Ernist Batyrkanov (from (Kazakhstan) Kyzylzhar)
12	GK	ARM	Arman Meliksetyan
16	MF	BRA	Luis Menezes (from (Brazil) Paraná)
19	DF	RUS	Aleksandr Stepanov (from (Armenia) Lori)
23	DF	RUS	Dmitri Kuzkin (from (Russia) Zvezda St.Petersburg)
44	MF	RUS	Norik Mkrtchyan (from (Russia) Kaluga)
77	MF	ARM	Erik Azizyan (on loan from (Armenia) Pyunik)
88	MF	ARM	Zaven Badoyan (from (Armenia) Ararat Yerevan)
99	FW	NGA	Pascal Chidi (from (United Arab Emirates) Khor Fakkan)

Out: Note: Flags indicate national team as defined under FIFA eligibility rules; some limited exceptions apply. Players may hold more than one non-FIFA nationality.

No.	Pos.	Nation	Player
2	GK	RUS	Samur Agamagomedov
5	DF	RUS	Aleksandr Tenyayev
7	MF	RUS	Vladislav Vasilyev
10	FW	CIV	Wilfried Eza (to Ararat-Armenia)
11	MF	RUS	Maxim Zestarev
12	GK	ARM	Henri Avagyan
14	MF	RUS	Pavel Korkin
15	DF	NGA	Deou Dosa (to (Armenia) Alashkert)
20	FW	ARM	Edgar Movsesyan (to (Armenia) Pyunik)
22	FW	ARM	Viulen Ayvazyan
25	MF	ARM	Davit Nalbandyan (loan return to Ararat-Armenia)
63	FW	RUS	Aleksandr Maksimenko
88	MF	RUS	Aleksey Shishkin (to (Russia) Khimik Dzerzhinsk)
98	MF	ARM	Garegin Kirakosyan
—	MF	RUS	Andrei Zorin (to (Kyrgyzstan) Alga Bishkek)
