= 2015–16 FC Pyunik season =

Pyunik
2015-16 season
- Manager: Sargis Hovsepyan
- Stadium: Vazgen Sargsyan Republican Stadium
- Premier League: 3rd
- Armenian Supercup: Champions
- Armenian Cup: Quarterfinal vs Gandzasar Kapan
- Champions League: Second qualifying round vs Molde
- Top goalscorer: League: Vardan Poghosyan (8); All: Vardges Satumyan (9)
Home colours	Away colours

The 2015–16 season was Pyunik's 22nd season in the Armenian Premier League.

== Squad ==
As of match played 18 May 2016

No.	Name	Nationality	Position	Date of birth (age)	Signed from	Signed in	Contract ends	Apps.	Goals
Goalkeepers
1	Anatoly Ayvazov	(Armenia)	GK	8 June 1996 (aged 19)	Unattached	2014		45	0
12	Gor Manukyan	(Armenia)	GK	27 September 1993 (aged 22)	Youth team	2012		67	0
32	Samvel Hunanyan	(Armenia)	GK	14 July 1995 (aged 20)	Youth team	2012		0	0
Defenders
2	Serob Grigoryan	(Armenia)	DF	4 February 1995 (aged 21)	Krylia Sovetov	2016		6	0
3	Varazdat Haroyan	(Armenia)	DF	24 August 1992 (aged 23)	Patani	2008		151	7
4	Artur Kartashyan	(Armenia)	DF	8 January 1997 (aged 19)	Youth team	2015		17	2
5	Armen Manucharyan	(Armenia)	DF	3 February 1995 (aged 21)	Banants	2016		10	1
16	Robert Hakobyan	(Armenia)	DF	22 October 1996 (aged 19)	Youth team	2014		42	0
20	Levon Hayrapetyan	(Armenia)	DF	17 April 1989 (aged 27)	1. FK Příbram	2015			
26	Hovik Nersesyan	(Armenia)	DF	6 February 1995 (aged 21)	Youth team	2014		11	0
33	Taron Voskanyan	(Armenia)	DF	22 February 1993 (aged 23)	Youth team	2010		167	5
Midfielders
6	Karen Harutyunyan	(Armenia)	MF	6 July 1995 (aged 20)	Banants	2016		0	0
7	Kamo Hovhannisyan	(Armenia)	MF	5 October 1992 (aged 23)	Patani	2009			
8	Sargis Shahinyan	(Armenia)	MF	10 September 1995 (aged 20)	Mika	2015		23	0
11	David Manoyan	(Armenia)	MF	5 July 1990 (aged 25)	Kuban Krasnodar	2013			
15	Artur Yuspashyan	(Armenia)	MF	7 September 1989 (aged 26)	Youth team	2007			
18	Alik Arakelyan	(Armenia)	MF	21 May 1996 (aged 19)	Mika	2015		24	2
21	Narek Aslanyan	(Armenia)	MF	4 June 1996 (aged 19)	Youth team	2012		51	6
23	Artur Nadiryan	(Armenia)	MF	27 March 1998 (aged 18)	Youth team	2015		11	0
25	Hovhannes Harutyunyan	(Armenia)	MF	25 May 1999 (aged 16)	Mika	2015		3	0
30	Vardges Satumyan	(Armenia)	MF	7 February 1990 (aged 26)	Mika	2015		30	9
34	Hovhannes Panosyan	(Armenia)	MF	7 February 1990 (aged 26)	Banants	2015		2	0
Forwards
9	Razmik Hakobyan	(Armenia)	FW	9 February 1996 (aged 20)	Youth team	2013		60	12
10	Erik Petrosyan	(Armenia)	FW	19 February 1998 (aged 18)	Youth team	2015		5	1
19	Robert Minasyan	(Armenia)	FW	8 April 1997 (aged 19)	Youth team	2014		5	0
Pyunik-2 players
	Vahagn Hayrapetyan	(Armenia)	MF	14 June 1997 (aged 18)	Youth team	2014		4	0
	Armen Mikaelyan	(Armenia)	DF	8 March 1992 (aged 24)	Youth team	2014		1	0
	Narek Mikayelyan	(Armenia)	DF	29 June 1994 (aged 21)	Youth team	2015		1	0
	Norik Mkrtchyan	(Armenia)	MF	9 September 1997 (aged 18)	Youth team	2015		0	0
	Hovhannes Poghosyan	(Armenia)	MF	17 December 1997 (aged 18)	Youth team	2013		0	0
	Erik Vardanyan	(Armenia)	MF	7 June 1998 (aged 17)	Youth team	2015		0	0
Players away on loan
Left during the season
4	Grigor Hovhannisyan	(Armenia)	DF	8 December 1993 (aged 22)	Youth team	2012		85	2
5	Erik Nazaryan	(Armenia)	DF	8 December 1993 (aged 22)	Youth team	2013		4	0
7	César Romero	(United States)	FW	2 August 1989 (aged 26)	Chivas USA	2014		33	27
7	Mikayel Khashmanyan	(Armenia)	DF	5 August 1996 (aged 19)	Banants	2014		2	0
8	Gagik Poghosyan	(Armenia)	DF	4 May 1993 (aged 23)	Banants	2011		143	16
10	Ghukas Poghosyan	(Armenia)	FW	6 February 1994 (aged 22)	Banants	2011		105	11
17	Zaven Badoyan	(Armenia)	MF	22 December 1989 (aged 26)	Gomel	2011		19	11
17	Vardan Pogosyan	(Armenia)	FW	8 March 1992 (aged 24)	loan from Kuban-2 Krasnodar	2015	2015	15	8
19	Vaspurak Minasyan	(Armenia)	DF	29 June 1994 (aged 21)	Gomel	2011		100	0
23	Rumyan Hovsepyan	(Armenia)	DF	29 June 1994 (aged 21)	Metalurh Donetsk	2011		3	0
25	John Jeremiah	(Nigeria)	FW	2 September 1993 (aged 22)	Zestafoni	2015		4	0

== Transfers ==
=== In ===
Date	Position	Nationality	Name	From	Fee	Ref.
1 July 2015	MF	(Armenia)	Vardges Satumyan	Mika	Undisclosed	
1 July 2015	MF	(Armenia)	Sargis Shahinyan	Mika	Undisclosed	
1 July 2015	MF	(Armenia)	Rumyan Hovsepyan	Metalurh Donetsk	Undisclosed	
1 July 2015	FW	(Nigeria)	John Jeremiah	Zestafoni	Undisclosed	
30 July 2015	MF	(Armenia)	Alik Arakelyan	Mika	Undisclosed	
11 January 2016	DF	(Armenia)	Armen Manucharyan	Banants	Undisclosed	
11 January 2016	MF	(Armenia)	Karen Harutyunyan	Banants	Undisclosed	
4 February 2016	DF	(Armenia)	Serob Grigoryan	Krylia Sovetov	Undisclosed	
28 February 2016	FW	(Armenia)	Vardan Pogosyan	Dacia Chișinău	Undisclosed	

=== Loans in ===
Date from	Position	Nationality	Name	From	Date to	Ref.
28 July 2015	FW	(Armenia)	Vardan Pogosyan	Kuban-2 Krasnodar	31 December 2015	

=== Released ===
Date	Position	Nationality	Name	Joined	Date	Ref.
30 July 2015	DF	(Armenia)	Grigor Hovhannisyan	Alashkert		
30 July 2015	FW	(Armenia)	Vardan Bakalyan	Alashkert		
31 July 2015	MF	(Armenia)	Zaven Badoyan	Banants		
31 July 2015	MF	(Armenia)	Rumyan Hovsepyan	Stal Dniprodzerzhynsk		
31 July 2015	FW	(Nigeria)	John Jeremiah	Banants		
31 July 2015	FW	(United States)	César Romero	Vardar	2 August 2015	
31 August 2015	MF	(Armenia)	Masis Voskanyan	K.V.V. Coxyde		
1 January 2016	DF	(Armenia)	Armen Mikayelyan			
1 January 2016	DF	(Armenia)	Narek Mikayelyan			
1 January 2016	DF	(Armenia)	Hovik Nersesyan	Eccleshall		
10 January 2016	DF	(Armenia)	Erik Nazaryan	Kotayk	1 July 2016	
10 January 2016	DF	(Armenia)	Vaspurak Minasyan	Gandzasar Kapan	1 July 2016	
20 January 2016	FW	(Armenia)	Gagik Poghosyan	Alashkert		
1 February 2016	MF	(Armenia)	Karen Yesayan	Ararat Yerevan		
25 April 2016	FW	(Armenia)	Ghukas Poghosyan	Shirak	1 July 2016	

== Friendlies ==
9 February 2016	Pyunik (Armenia)	1 – 2	(Belarus) Shakhtyor Soligorsk	Ayia Napa, Cyprus
(UTC+4)	Hovhannisyan	Report	Goal

15 February 2016	Pyunik (Armenia)	0 – 0	(Ukraine) Dnipro Cherkasy	Ayia Napa, Cyprus
(UTC+4)		Report

15 February 2016	Pyunik (Armenia)	3 – 1	(Russia) Dynamo-2 Moscow	Ayia Napa, Cyprus
(UTC+4)	R.Hakobyan; H.Panosyan; E.Petrosyan	Report	Goal

20 February 2016	Pyunik (Armenia)	1 – 4	(Lithuania) Atlantas	Ayia Napa, Cyprus
(UTC+4)	A.Mikaelyan	Report	Goal

21 February 2016	Pyunik (Armenia)	0 – 0	(Poland) Wigry Suwałki	Ayia Napa, Cyprus
(UTC+4)		Report
Note: Match cancelled due to heavy rain in the 55th minute.

== Competitions ==
=== Overall record ===
Competition	First match	Last match	Starting round	Final position	Record							
Competition	First match	Last match	Starting round	Final position	Pld	W	D	L	GF	GA	GD	Win %
Premier League	1 August 2015	18 May 2016	Matchday 1	3rd	28	13	9	6	44	21	+23	46.43
Armenian Cup	21 October 2015	4 November 2015	Quarterfinal	Quarterfinal	2	0	1	1	1	3	−2	0.00
Armenian Supercup	24 September 2015	24 September 2015	Final	Champions	2	1	0	1	2	3	−1	50.00
UEFA Champions League	30 June 20165	21 July 2015	First qualifying round	Second qualifying round	4	3	0	1	5	7	−2	75.00
Total					36	17	10	9	52	34	+18	47.22

Last updated: 18 May 2016
Source: Competitions

=== Supercup ===
24 September 2015	Pyunik	3 – 0	Mika	Yerevan
19:00 (UTC+4)	Kartashyan 36'; Ra.Hakobyan 38' (yellow card) 42'; H.Nersisyan (yellow card) 52'; Manoyan 74'	Report	Obradović (yellow card) 42'	Stadium: Vazgen Sargsyan Republican Stadium; Attendance: 1,000; Referee: Suren Baliyan

=== Premier League ===
==== Results summary ====
Overall								Home						Away					
Pld	W	D	L	GF	GA	GD	Pts	W	D	L	GF	GA	GD	W	D	L	GF	GA	GD
28	13	9	6	44	21	+23	48	7	4	3	24	9	+15	6	5	3	20	12	+8

Last updated: 18 May 2016.
Source: See Results

==== Results ====
1 August 2015 1	Pyunik	1 – 2	Alashkert	Yerevan
19:00 (UTC+4)	Haroyan 12'; T.Voskanyan (yellow card) 73'; V.Pogosyan (yellow card) 78'	Report	Héber 22', 82' (pen.) (yellow card) 56'; K.Veranyan (yellow card) 45'	Stadium: Yerevan Football Academy; Attendance: 800; Referee: Zaven Hovhannisyan

8 August 2015 2	Pyunik	5 – 1	Banants	Yerevan
19:00 (UTC+4)	V.Satumyan 22', 47'; S.Shahinyan (yellow card) 39'; K.Hovhannisyan 43'; V.Poghosyan 56' (yellow card) 67'; T.Voskanyan (yellow card) 75'; Yuspashyan 85'	Report	Laércio 39' (pen.) (yellow card) 81'	Stadium: Yerevan Football Academy Stadium; Attendance: 400; Referee: Artur Simonyan

16 August 2015 3	Ararat Yerevan	1 – 1	Pyunik	Yerevan
19:00 (UTC+4)	Nranyan (yellow card) 11'; Rakić 27'; Martirosyan (yellow card) 72'	Report	Gh.Poghosyan 80'; Ro.Hakobyan (yellow card) 81'	Stadium: Hrazdan Stadium; Attendance: 500; Referee: Suren Baliyan

23 August 2015 4	Pyunik	3 – 0	Shirak	Yerevan
19:00 (UTC+4)	K.Hovhannisyan 10'; Yuspashyan (yellow card) 31' (goal) 42'; Ro.Hakobyan (yellow card) 61'; A.Nadiryan (yellow card) 81'	Report	Aleksanyan (yellow card) 38'; G.Malakyan (yellow card) 39'	Stadium: Yerevan Football Academy Stadium; Attendance: 600; Referee: Artur Simonyan

30 August 2015 5	Gandzasar Kapan	1 – 1	Pyunik	Kapan
17:00 (UTC+4)	Arm.Petrosyan (yellow card) 55'; Burayev 90+3' (pen.)	Report	A.Arakelyan 59'; A.Ayvazov (yellow card) 90+2'	Stadium: Gandzasar Stadium; Attendance: 2,500; Referee: Suren Baliyan

13 September 2015 6	Pyunik	2 – 0	Ulisses	Yerevan
19:00 (UTC+4)	V.Satumyan 5'; Ga.Poghosyan (yellow card) 47'; V.Poghosyan 82'	Report	T.Kandikijan (yellow card) 3'; Zagrè (yellow card) 70'	Stadium: Yerevan Football Academy Stadium; Attendance: 300; Referee: Artur Safaryan

20 September 2015 7	Mika	1 – 0	Pyunik	Yerevan
16:00 (UTC+4)	A.Grigoryan (yellow card) 25'; Talalay (yellow card) 28'; Melkonyan 42'; Toboyev (yellow card) 58'; A.Belomyttsev (yellow card) 80'; Inkin (yellow card) 90+2'	Report	Ro.Hakobyan (yellow card) 33'; Arakelyan (yellow card) 34'; Haroyan (yellow card) 51'	Stadium: Mika Stadium; Attendance: 500; Referee: Artur Simonyan

27 September 2015 8	Alashkert	1 – 4	Pyunik	Yerevan
15:00 (UTC+4)	M.Manasyan 58'; Muradyan (yellow card) 61'	Report	Gh.Poghosyan 1', 66', 90+2'; V.Pogosyan 40'; Ga.Poghosyan (yellow card) 55'	Stadium: Alashkert Stadium; Attendance: 500; Referee: Zaven Hovhannisyan

3 October 2015 9	Banants	0 – 1	Pyunik	Yerevan
15:00 (UTC+4)	Drobarov (yellow card) 24'; A.Shakhnazaryan (yellow card) 69'; G.Maghaqyan (yellow card) 85'; Manucharyan (yellow card) 90+4'	Report	Hayrapetyan 70' (pen.) (yellow card) 75'; Haroyan (yellow card) 71'	Stadium: Banants Stadium; Attendance: 1,000; Referee: Artur Safaryan

18 October 2015 10	Pyunik	0 – 1	Ararat Yerevan	Yerevan
16:00 (UTC+4)	Manoyan (red card) 61'; Yuspashyan (yellow card) 69'; K.Hovhannisyan (yellow card) 76'; Hayrapetyan (yellow card) 82'	Report	Nranyan 6' (yellow card) 80'; Chueca (yellow card) 40'; Kaina (yellow card) 82' de la Fuente (yellow card) 90+1'	Stadium: Yerevan Football Academy Stadium; Attendance: 500; Referee: Artur Simonyan

24 October 2015 11	Shirak	0 – 2	Pyunik	Gyumri
15:00 (UTC+4)	D.Hakobyan (yellow card) 42'; G.Malakyan (yellow card) 81'	Report	V.Pogosyan 55'; T.Voskanyan (yellow card) 62'; V.Satumyan (yellow card) 76' (goal) 78'	Stadium: Gyumri City Stadium; Attendance: 800; Referee: Suren Baliyan

1 November 2015 12	Pyunik	4 – 0	Gandzasar Kapan	Yerevan
16:00 (UTC+4)	Manoyan 40' (pen.); V.Pogosyan 56'; Ra.Hakobyan (yellow card) 64' (goal) 76', 88'; Haroyan (yellow card) 73'	Report	Wbeymar (yellow card) 48'; Beglaryan (yellow card) 81'	Stadium: Yerevan Football Academy Stadium; Attendance: 200; Referee: Zaven Hovhannisyan

8 November 2015 13	Ulisses	1 – 4	Pyunik	Yerevan
14:00 (UTC+4)	P.Tevosyan (yellow card) 2'; Ro.Hakobyan 21' (o.g.); K.Avetisyan (yellow card) 45'	Report	Manoyan 3' (pen.); V.Poghosyan 5', 45' (pen.); Arakelyan (yellow card) 21'; K.Hovhannisyan 29'; Haroyan (yellow card) 50'; Manukyan (yellow card) 74'	Stadium: Vazgen Sargsyan Republican Stadium; Attendance: 100; Referee: Artur Safaryan

22 November 2015 14	Pyunik	2 – 1	Mika	Yerevan
16:00 (UTC+4)	Arakelyan 18'; V.Satumyan 49'; V.Poghosyan (red card) 55'	Report	Kvekveskiri 11' (yellow card) 37'; N.Balayan (yellow card) 45' (yellow-red card) 88'; Chistyakov (yellow card) 55'; Zaripov (yellow card) 80'; Inkin (yellow card) 90+2'	Stadium: Yerevan Football Academy Stadium; Attendance: 500; Referee: Zaven Hovhannisyan

28 November 2015 15	Pyunik	0 – 0	Alashkert	Yerevan
16:00 (UTC+4)		Report	V.Minasyan (yellow card) 44'; Ge.Poghosyan (yellow card) 50'; A.Hovsepyan (yellow card) 56'; M.Manasyan (yellow card) 62'	Stadium: Yerevan Football Academy; Attendance: 700; Referee: Suren Baliyan

2 March 2016 16	Pyunik	1 – 2	Banants	Yerevan
14:00 (UTC+4)	Gh.Poghosyan 6' (yellow card) 28'	Report	Drobarov (yellow card) 53'; Laércio 45'; Badoyan 69'; Burayev (yellow card) 71'	Stadium: Vazgen Sargsyan Republican Stadium; Attendance: 300; Referee: Zaven Hovhannisyan

13 March 2016 17	Ararat Yerevan	1 – 2	Pyunik	Yerevan
16:00 (UTC+4)	Glavaš (yellow card) 3'; G.Khachatryan (yellow card) 55'; N.Grigoryan 69'	Report	A.Arakelyan (yellow card) 22'; A.Manucharyan 36'; A.Kartashyan 57'; Haroyan (yellow card) 61'	Stadium: Hrazdan Stadium; Attendance: 500; Referee: Suren Baliyan

20 March 2016 18	Pyunik	1 – 1	Shirak	Yerevan
16:00 (UTC+4)	Ro.Hakobyan (yellow card) 32'; Manoyan 88'	Report	Darbinyan (yellow card) 43'; K.Kouakou (yellow card) 64'; Hovsepyan 65'; A.Davoyan (yellow card) 82'	Stadium: Yerevan Football Academy Stadium; Attendance: 350; Referee: Suren Baliyan

6 April 2016 19	Gandzasar Kapan	1 – 0	Pyunik	Kapan
14:00 (UTC+4)	Beglaryan (yellow card) 30'; Arm.Petrosyan (yellow card) 34'; Kpodo 67'	Report	A.Arakelyan (yellow card) 29'; Yuspashyan (yellow card) 55'; Poghosyan (yellow card) 68'	Stadium: Gandzasar Stadium; Attendance: 1,500; Referee: Artur Simonyan

3 April 2016 20	Pyunik	3 – 0	Ulisses	Yerevan
18:00 (UTC+4)		Report		Stadium: Yerevan Football Academy Stadium
Note: Match cancelled and awarded to Pyunik after Ulisses were expelled from the league in February 2016.

10 April 2016 21	Mika	0 – 0	Pyunik	Yerevan
16:00 (UTC+4)	Chicherin (yellow card) 28'; Dmitry Lushnikov (yellow card) 53'; Kovačević (yellow card) 78'	Report	T.Voskanyan (yellow card) 32'; Aslanyan (yellow card) 86'	Stadium: Mika Stadium; Attendance: 200; Referee: Zaven Hovhannisyan

16 April 2016 22	Alashkert	3 – 0	Pyunik	Yerevan
16:00 (UTC+4)	M.Manasyan 54'; Muradyan (yellow card) 65'; Arakelyan 72'; Arta.Yedigaryan 77'; A.Voskanyan (yellow card) 90+2'	Report		Stadium: Alashkert Stadium; Attendance: 800; Referee: Suren Baliyan

23 April 2016 23	Banants	1 – 1	Pyunik	Yerevan
17:00 (UTC+4)	Kalmanov (yellow card) 48'; López (yellow card) 85'; Badoyan 87'; Laércio (yellow card) 90'	Report	E.Petrosyan 68'; Grigoryan (yellow card) 90'	Stadium: Banants Stadium; Attendance: 600; Referee: Zaven Hovhannisyan

30 April 2016 24	Pyunik	0 – 0	Ararat Yerevan	Yerevan
19:00 (UTC+4)		Report	Avagimyan (yellow card) 24'; R.Kaya (yellow card) 36' (yellow-red card) 71'; B.Hovhannisyan (yellow card) 83'; Nwabueze (yellow card) 86'	Stadium: Yerevan Football Academy Stadium; Attendance: 500; Referee: Artak Simonyan

8 May 2016 25	Shirak	1 – 1	Pyunik	Gyumri
17:00 (UTC+4)	A.Hovhannisyan (yellow card) 45'; Diarrassouba 62'; Darbinyan (yellow card) 74'; K.Kouakou (yellow card) 81'; M.Kaba (yellow card) 87'	Report	Yuspashyan (yellow card) 44'; V.Pogosyan 79'	Stadium: Gyumri City Stadium; Attendance: 1,500; Referee: Suren Baliyan

15 May 2016 26	Pyunik	0 – 0	Gandzasar Kapan	Yerevan
19:00 (UTC+4)	T.Voskanyan (yellow card) 27'; Haroyan (yellow card) 60' (yellow-red card) 81'	Report	Arm.Petrosyan (yellow card) 32'; Otoo (yellow card) 34'; G.Harutyunyan (yellow card) 57'; Ishkhanyan (yellow card) 75'	Stadium: Vazgen Sargsyan Republican Stadium; Attendance: 200; Referee: Zaven Hovhannisyan

22 May 2016 27	Ulisses	0 – 3	Pyunik	Yerevan
19:00 (UTC+4)		Report		Stadium: Vazgen Sargsyan Republican Stadium
Note: Match cancelled and awarded to Pyunik after Ulisses were expelled from the league in February 2016.

18 May 2016 28	Pyunik	2 – 1	Mika	Yerevan
17:00 (UTC+4)	V.Satumyan 8', 44'; Ro.Hakobyan (yellow card) 46'; K.Hovhannisyan (yellow card) 83'; Manoyan (yellow card) 90+2'	Report	Kudinov (yellow card) 25'; V.Movsisyan (yellow card) 56' (yellow-red card) 77'; Shumilin 63'	Stadium: Vazgen Sargsyan Republican Stadium; Attendance: 200; Referee: Suren Baliyan

==== Table ====
Pos	Team	Pld	W	D	L	GF	GA	GD	Pts	Qualification or relegation
1	Alashkert (C)	28	16	7	5	50	24	+26	55	Qualification for the Champions League first qualifying round
2	Shirak	28	15	7	6	41	27	+14	52	Qualification for the Europa League first qualifying round
3	Pyunik	28	13	9	6	44	21	+23	48	Qualification for the Europa League first qualifying round
4	Gandzasar Kapan	28	11	12	5	35	27	+8	45	
5	Ararat Yerevan	28	9	10	9	28	31	−3	37	

Source: Football Federation of Armenia, Soccerway
Rules for classification: 1) Points; 2) Play-off (only if deciding champion); 3) Matches won; 4) Head-to-head points; 5) Head-to-head matches won; 6) Head-to-head goal difference; 7) Head-to-head goals scored; 8) Head-to-head away goals scored; 9) Goal difference; 10) Goals scored.
(C) Champions

=== Armenian Cup ===
21 October 2015 Quarterfinal 1st leg	Pyunik	1 – 3	Gandzasar Kapan	Yerevan
16:00 (UTC+4)	Haroyan (yellow card) 21'; Hayrapetyan 30'; Ga.Poghosyan (yellow card) 83'	Report	Beglaryan 41', 74'; Musonda 61' (yellow card) 70'	Stadium: Yerevan Football Academy Stadium; Attendance: 500; Referee: Zaven Hovhannisyan

4 November 2015 Quarterfinal 2nd leg	Gandzasar Kapan	0 – 0 (3 – 1 agg.)	Pyunik	Kapan
15:00 (UTC+4)	A.Hambartsumyan (yellow card) 3'; Ale.Petrosyan (yellow card) 21'; A.Avagyan (yellow card) 75'; G.Harutyunyan (yellow card) 86'	Report	Kartashyan (yellow card) 20'	Stadium: Gandzasar Stadium; Attendance: 1,200; Referee: Suren Baliyan

=== UEFA Champions League ===
==== Qualifying rounds ====
30 June 2015 First qualifying round 1st leg	Pyunik (Armenia)	2 – 1	(San Marino) Folgore	Yerevan, Armenia
20:00 (UTC+4)	Hovsepyan (yellow card) 35'; Satumyan 45+2'; Romero 48'; K.Hovhannisyan (yellow card) 70'	Report	Pacini (yellow card) 22'; F.Ceschi (yellow card) 56' (yellow-red card) 71'	Stadium: Vazgen Sargsyan Republican Stadium; Attendance: 4,000; Referee: Dimitrios Massias (Cyprus)
Note: Pyunik played their home matches at Vazgen Sargsyan Republican Stadium, Yerevan, instead of their regular stadium Football Academy Stadium, Yerevan.

7 July 2015 First qualifying round 2nd leg	Folgore (San Marino)	1 – 2 (2 – 4 agg.)	(Armenia) Pyunik	Serravalle, San Marino
22:30 (UTC+4)	G.Bollini (yellow card) 40'; Pacini (yellow card) 45'; M.Muccini (yellow card) 56'; Traini 65'; Berardi (yellow card) 73'	Report	K.Hovhannisyan 6'; Haroyan (yellow card) 11'; Yuspashyan (yellow card) 40'; Satumyan 41'; Romero (yellow card) 90+2'	Stadium: San Marino Stadium; Attendance: 821; Referee: Ignasi Villamayor Rozados (Andorra)

14 July 2015 Second qualifying round 1st leg	Molde (Norway)	5 – 0	(Armenia) Pyunik	Molde, Norway
22:00 (UTC+4)	Elyounoussi 35', 44'; Hussain (yellow card) 81'; Kamara 84', 90+2'; Moström 90+5'	Report		Stadium: Aker Stadion; Attendance: 5,650; Referee: Pavle Radovanović (Montenegro)

21 July 2015 Second qualifying round 2nd leg	Pyunik (Armenia)	1 – 0 (1 – 5 agg.)	(Norway) Molde	Yerevan, Armenia
18:00 (UTC+4)	Gh.Poghosyan (yellow card) 71'; Badoyan 75'	Report		Stadium: Vazgen Sargsyan Republican Stadium; Attendance: 2,500; Referee: Anatoliy Abdula (Ukraine)
Note: Pyunik played their home matches at Vazgen Sargsyan Republican Stadium, Yerevan, instead of their regular stadium Football Academy Stadium, Yerevan.

== Statistics ==
As of match played 18 May 2016

=== Appearances and goals ===
No.	Pos	Nat	Player	Total		Premier League		Armenian Cup		Armenian Supercup		Champions League	
No.	Pos	Nat	Player	Apps	Goals	Apps	Goals	Apps	Goals	Apps	Goals	Apps	Goals
1	GK	(Armenia) ARM	Anatoliy Ayvazov	16	0	12	0	0	0	0	0	4	0
2	DF	(Armenia) ARM	Serob Grigoryan	6	0	4+2	0	0	0	0	0	0	0
3	DF	(Armenia) ARM	Varazdat Haroyan	27	1	21+1	1	1	0	0	0	4	0
4	DF	(Armenia) ARM	Artur Kartashyan	14	2	8+4	1	1	0	1	1	0	0
5	DF	(Armenia) ARM	Armen Manucharyan	10	1	10	1	0	0	0	0	0	0
7	MF	(Armenia) ARM	Kamo Hovhannisyan	32	4	25+1	3	2	0	0	0	4	1
8	MF	(Armenia) ARM	Sargis Shahinyan	23	0	11+8	0	1+1	0	0+1	0	0+1	0
9	FW	(Armenia) ARM	Razmik Hakobyan	19	1	2+11	0	1	0	1	1	1+3	0
10	FW	(Armenia) ARM	Erik Petrosyan	5	1	0+5	1	0	0	0	0	0	0
11	MF	(Armenia) ARM	David Manoyan	29	4	17+8	3	1	0	1	1	0+2	0
12	GK	(Armenia) ARM	Gor Manukyan	17	0	14	0	2	0	1	0	0	0
15	MF	(Armenia) ARM	Artur Yuspashyan	30	2	24	2	2	0	0	0	4	0
16	DF	(Armenia) ARM	Robert Hakobyan	24	2	18+4	2	2	0	0	0	0	0
17	FW	(Armenia) ARM	Vardan Poghosyan	15	8	13+1	8	0+1	0	0	0	0	0
18	MF	(Armenia) ARM	Alik Arakelyan	24	2	18+4	2	2	0	0	0	0	0
19	FW	(Armenia) ARM	Robert Minasyan	5	0	5	0	0	0	0	0	0	0
20	DF	(Armenia) ARM	Levon Hayrapetyan	24	2	16+2	1	1	1	0+1	0	4	0
21	MF	(Armenia) ARM	Narek Aslanyan	5	0	1+3	0	0+1	0	0	0	0	0
23	MF	(Armenia) ARM	Artur Nadiryan	11	0	0+9	0	0+1	0	0+1	0	0	0
25	MF	(Armenia) ARM	Hovhannes Harutyunyan	3	0	0+3	0	0	0	0	0	0	0
26	DF	(Armenia) ARM	Hovik Nersisyan	4	0	0+3	0	0	0	1	0	0	0
30	MF	(Armenia) ARM	Vardges Satumyan	30	9	16+8	7	2	0	0	0	4	2
33	DF	(Armenia) ARM	Taron Voskanyan	31	0	24	0	2	0	1	0	4	0
34	FW	(Armenia) ARM	Hovhannes Panosyan	2	0	0+2	0	0	0	0	0	0	0
Youth Players:
7	DF	(Armenia) ARM	Mikayel Khashmanyan	1	0	0	0	0	0	1	0	0	0
10	MF	(Armenia) ARM	Hovhannes Poghosyan	1	0	0	0	0	0	1	0	0	0
Players away on loan:
Players who left Pyunik during the season:
3	DF	(Armenia) ARM	Armen Mikayelyan	1	0	0	0	0	0	1	0	0	0
4	DF	(Armenia) ARM	Grigor Hovhannisyan	3	0	0	0	0	0	0	0	2+1	0
5	DF	(Armenia) ARM	Erik Nazaryan	1	0	0	0	0	0	0+1	0	0	0
7	FW	(United States) USA	César Romero	3	1	0	0	0	0	0	0	2+1	1
8	MF	(Armenia) ARM	Gagik Poghosyan	15	0	6+3	0	1+1	0	1	0	3	0
10	FW	(Armenia) ARM	Ghukas Poghosyan	23	5	18+2	5	1+1	0	0	0	0+1	0
17	MF	(Armenia) ARM	Zaven Badoyan	4	0	0	0	0	0	0	0	4	0
19	DF	(Armenia) ARM	Vaspurak Minasyan	2	0	0+1	0	0	0	1	0	0	0
23	MF	(Armenia) ARM	Rumyan Hovsepyan	3	0	0	0	0	0	0	0	2+1	0
23	DF	(Armenia) ARM	Narek Mikayelyan	1	0	0+1	0	0	0	0	0	0	0
25	FW	(Nigeria) NGR	John Jeremiah	4	0	0	0	0	0	0	0	2+2	0

=== Goal scorers ===
Place	Position	Nation	Number	Name	Premier League	Armenian Cup	Supercup	Champions League	Total
1	MF	(Armenia)	30	Vardges Satumyan	7	0	0	2	9
2	FW	(Armenia)	17	Vardan Poghosyan	8	0	0	0	8
3	FW	(Armenia)	10	Ghukas Poghosyan	5	0	0	0	5
4	MF	(Armenia)	11	David Manoyan	3	0	1	0	4
4	MF	(Armenia)	7	Kamo Hovhannisyan	3	0	0	1	4
6	MF	(Armenia)	15	Artur Yuspashyan	2	0	0	0	2
6	MF	(Armenia)	18	Alik Arakelyan	2	0	0	0	2
6	DF	(Armenia)	16	Robert Hakobyan	2	0	0	0	2
6	DF	(Armenia)	20	Levon Hayrapetyan	1	1	0	0	2
6	DF	(Armenia)	4	Artur Kartashyan	1	0	1	0	2
11	DF	(Armenia)	3	Varazdat Haroyan	1	0	0	0	1
11	DF	(Armenia)	5	Armen Manucharyan	1	0	0	0	1
11	FW	(Armenia)	10	Erik Petrosyan	1	0	0	0	1
11	FW	(Armenia)	9	Razmik Hakobyan	0	0	1	0	1
11	FW	(United States)	7	César Romero	0	0	0	1	1
11	MF	(Armenia)	17	Zaven Badoyan	0	0	0	1	1
11				Own goal	1	0	0	0	1
				Awarded	6	0	0	0	6
				TOTALS	44	1	3	5	53

=== Clean sheets ===
Place	Position	Nation	Number	Name	Premier League	Armenian Cup	Supercup	Champions League	Total
1	GK	(Armenia)	12	Gor Manukyan	5	1	1	0	7
2	GK	(Armenia)	22	Anatoli Aivazov	4	0	0	1	5
				TOTALS	9	1	1	1	12

=== Disciplinary record ===
Number	Nation	Position	Name	Premier League		Armenian Cup		Armenian Supercup		Champions League		Total	
Number	Nation	Position	Name	Yellow card	Red card	Yellow card	Red card	Yellow card	Red card	Yellow card	Red card	Yellow card	Red card
2	(Armenia)	DF	Serob Grigoryan	1	0	0	0	0	0	0	0	1	0
3	(Armenia)	DF	Varazdat Haroyan	7	1	1	0	0	0	1	0	2	0
4	(Armenia)	DF	Artur Kartashyan	0	0	1	0	0	0	0	0	1	0
7	(Armenia)	MF	Kamo Hovhannisyan	2	0	0	0	0	0	1	0	3	0
8	(Armenia)	MF	Sargis Shahinyan	1	0	0	0	0	0	0	0	1	0
9	(Armenia)	FW	Razmik Hakobyan	2	0	0	0	1	0	0	0	3	0
11	(Armenia)	MF	David Manoyan	1	1	0	0	0	0	0	0	1	1
12	(Armenia)	GK	Gor Manukyan	1	0	0	0	0	0	0	0	1	0
15	(Armenia)	MF	Artur Yuspashyan	4	0	0	0	0	0	1	0	5	0
16	(Armenia)	DF	Robert Hakobyan	4	0	0	0	0	0	0	0	4	0
17	(Armenia)	FW	Vardan Poghosyan	2	1	0	0	0	0	0	0	2	1
18	(Armenia)	MF	Alik Arakelyan	4	0	0	0	0	0	0	0	4	0
20	(Armenia)	DF	Levon Hayrapetyan	2	0	0	0	0	0	0	0	2	0
21	(Armenia)	MF	Narek Aslanyan	1	0	0	0	0	0	0	0	1	0
22	(Armenia)	GK	Anatoli Aivazov	1	0	0	0	0	0	0	0	1	0
23	(Armenia)	MF	Artur Nadiryan	1	0	0	0	0	0	0	0	1	0
26	(Armenia)	DF	Hovik Nersisyan	0	0	0	0	1	0	0	0	1	0
30	(Armenia)	MF	Vardges Satumyan	1	0	0	0	0	0	0	0	1	0
33	(Armenia)	DF	Taron Voskanyan	5	0	0	0	0	0	0	0	5	0
Players who left Pyunik during the season:
7	(United States)	FW	César Romero	0	0	0	0	0	0	1	0	1	0
8	(Armenia)	MF	Gagik Poghosyan	2	0	1	0	0	0	0	0	3	0
10	(Armenia)	FW	Ghukas Poghosyan	2	0	0	0	0	0	1	0	3	0
23	(Armenia)	MF	Rumyan Hovsepyan	0	0	0	0	0	0	1	0	1	0
			TOTALS	44	3	3	0	2	0	6	0	55	3
