= Ebrima Jatta =

Ebrima Jatta may refer to:

- Ebrima Jatta (footballer, born 1987)
- Ebrima Jatta (footballer, born 2002)
