= Sultan Aksanov =

Russian professional football player

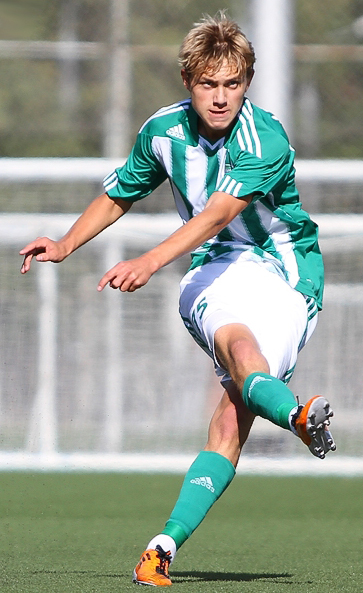
- Aksanov with FC Tom Tomsk in 2011

Personal information
- Full name: Sultan Raisovich Aksanov
- Date of birth: 19 August 1993 (age 33)
- Place of birth: Tomsk, Russia
- Height: 1.76 m (5 ft 9 in)
- Position: Midfielder

Youth career
- FC Kedr Tomsk
- FC Tom Tomsk

Senior career*
Years	Team	Apps	(Gls)
2013–2016	FC Tom Tomsk	2	(0)
2014–2016	→ FC Tom-2 Tomsk (loan)	43	(4)
2018–2020	Sevan	29	(8)
2020	FC Ani	5	(1)
2020–2022	Yadro St. Petersburg (amateur)		
2022–2023	Yadro St. Petersburg	6	(0)
- * Club domestic league appearances and goals

Sultan Raisovich Aksanov (Russian: Султан Раисович Аксанов; born 19 August 1993) is a Russian former professional football player who plays as a midfielder.

== Career ==
Aksanov made his professional debut for FC Tom Tomsk on 23 April 2013 in a game against FC SKA-Energiya Khabarovsk.
