= Artur Kartashyan =

Armenian footballer

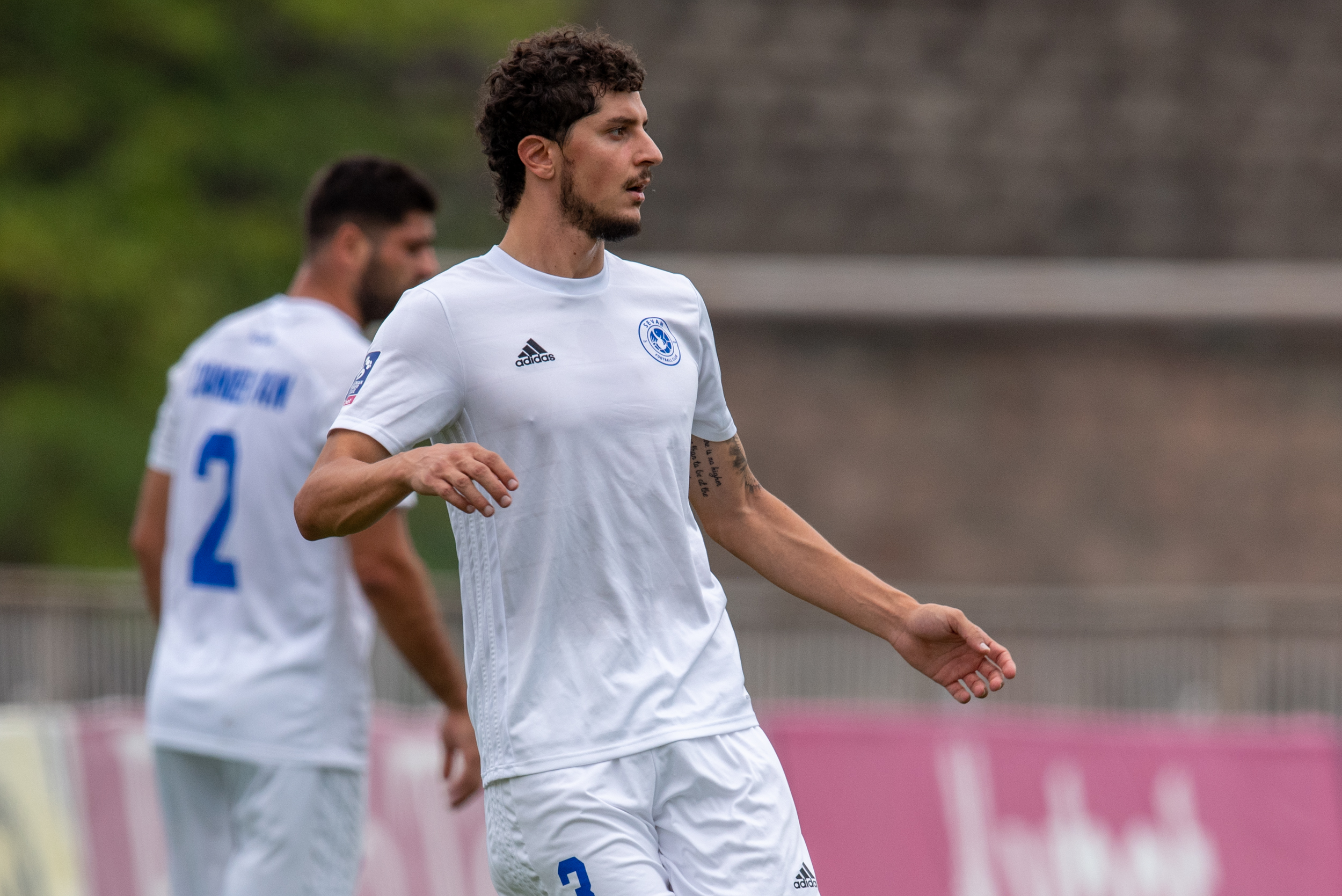
- Kartashyan with Sevan in 2021

Personal information
- Date of birth: 8 January 1997 (age 29)
- Place of birth: Yerevan, Armenia
- Height: 1.88 m (6 ft 2 in)
- Position: Defender

Team information
- Current team: Ararat Yerevan
- Number: 5

Youth career
- Pyunik

Senior career*
Years	Team	Apps	(Gls)
2015–2021	Pyunik	85	(5)
2021	Sevan	12	(0)
2022	Noah	15	(0)
2022–2023	Olympiakos Nicosia	11	(0)
2023	Van	9	(0)
2023	Istiklol	3	(0)
2024	Telavi	4	(0)
2024–2025	Alashkert	2	(0)
2024–2025	→ West Armenia (loan)	21	(1)
2025–	Ararat Yerevan	21	(0)

International career^{‡}
2013	Armenia U17	2	(0)
2015–2018	Armenia U21	16	(0)
2018–	Armenia	1	(1)
- * Club domestic league appearances and goals as of 18 June 2026 ‡ National team caps and goals as of 04:29, 17 November 2018 (UTC)

Artur Kartashyan (Armenian: Արթուր Քարտաշյան; born 8 January 1997) is an Armenian professional footballer who plays as a defender for Armenian Premier League club Ararat Yerevan and the Armenia national team.

== Club career ==
Kartashyan left his native Pyunik in June 2021 by mutual agreement.

On 17 June 2022, Kartashyan transferred to сypriot Olympiakos Nicosia

On 13 July 2023, Tajikistan Higher League club Istiklol announced the signing of Kartashyan.

On 23 August 2024, he joined West Armenia on loan from Alashkert.

On 19 June 2025, it was officially announced that Kartashyan had signed a contract with Ararat Yerevan.

== International career ==
Kartashyan made his international debut for Armenia on 16 November 2018, starting in the 2018–19 UEFA Nations League D match against Gibraltar. He assisted Yura Movsisyan on the first of his four goals, and then scored himself in the 66th minute to put Armenia up 5–1, with the match finishing as a 6–2 away win.

== Career statistics ==
As of match played 7 November 2023

Appearances and goals by club, season and competition
Club	Season	League			National cup		League cup		Continental		Other		Total	
Club	Season	Division	Apps	Goals	Apps	Goals	Apps	Goals	Apps	Goals	Apps	Goals	Apps	Goals
Pyunik	2014–15	Armenian Premier League	3	0	0	0	–		–		0 (Note: Appearances and goals in the Armenian Supercup)	0	3	0
Pyunik	2015–16	Armenian Premier League	12	1	1	0	–		0 (Note: Appearances in the UEFA Champions League)	0	1	1	14	2
Pyunik	2016–17	Armenian Premier League	28	4	5	0	–		2 (Note: Appearances in the UEFA Europa League)	0	–		33	4
Pyunik	2017–18	Armenian Premier League	26	0	1	0	–		2	0	–		27	0
Pyunik	2018–19	Armenian Premier League	9	0	1	0	–		0	0	–		10	0
Pyunik	2019–20	Armenian Premier League	7	0	0	0	–		0	0	–		0	0
Pyunik	2020–21	Armenian Premier League	10	0	0	0	–		–		–		0	0
Pyunik	Total		95	5	8	0	0	0	4	0	2	1	109	6
Sevan	2021–22	Armenian Premier League	12	0	1	0	–		–		–		13	0
Noah	2021–22	Armenian Premier League	15	0	0	0	–		0 (Note: Appearances in the UEFA Europa Conference League)	0	–		15	0
Olympiakos Nicosia	2022–23	Cypriot First Division	10	0	1	0	–		–		–		11	0
Van	2022–23	Armenian Premier League	9	0	0	0	–		–		–		9	0
Istiklol	2023	Tajikistan Higher League	3	0	4	0	–		4 (Note: Appearances in the AFC Champions League)	0	0 (Note: Appearances in the Tajik Supercup)	0	11	0
Career total			144	5	14	0	0	0	8	0	2	1	168	6

=== International ===
As of 16 November 2018

Appearances and goals by national team and year
National team	Year	Apps	Goals
Armenia	2018	1	1
Total		1	1

As of 16 November 2018. Scores and results list Armenia's goal tally first.

No.	Date	Venue	Opponent	Score	Result	Competition
1	16 November 2018	Victoria Stadium, Gibraltar	Gibraltar	5–1	6–2	2018–19 UEFA Nations League D

== Honours ==
Istiklol

- Tajik League: 2023
- Tajik Cup: 2023
