= Marco Berardi =

Italian footballer

Personal information
- Date of birth: 25 March 1996 (age 30)
- Place of birth: Massa Marittima, Italy
- Height: 1.83 m (6 ft 0 in)
- Position: Midfielder

Team information
- Current team: Lavagnese

Youth career
- –2015: Fiorentina

Senior career*
Years	Team	Apps	(Gls)
2015–2018	Fiorentina	0	(0)
2015–2016	→ Pordenone (loan)	16	(1)
2016–2017	→ Tuttocuoio (loan)	32	(2)
2017–2018	→ Südtirol (loan)	4	(0)
2018–2022	Follonica Gavorrano	96	(4)
2022–	Lavagnese	18	(1)
- * Club domestic league appearances and goals as of 20 February 2023

Marco Berardi (born 25 March 1996) is an Italian football player who plays for Serie D club Lavagnese.

== Club career ==
=== Fiorentina ===
==== Loan to Pordenone ====
On 12 August 2016, Berardi was signed by Serie C side Pordenone on a season-long loan deal. On 6 September he made his Serie C debut for Pordenone, as a starter and played the entire match in a 1–1 away draw against Pro Piacenza. On 5 December, Berardi scored his first professional goal in the twelfth minute of a 3–1 home defeat against Cittadella. Berardi ended his season-long loan to Pordenone with 16 appearances and 1 goal.

==== Loan to Tuttocuoio ====
On 19 July 2017, Berardi was loaned to Serie C side Tuttocuoio on a season-long loan deal. On 31 July he made his debut for Tuttocuoio in a 3–2 away defeat, after extra-time, against Casertana in the first round of Coppa Italia, he played the entire match. On 28 August, Berardi made his debut in Serie C for Tuttocuoio and he scored his first professional goal in the 86th minute of a 2–2 away draw against Prato. On 19 February 2018 he scored his second goal in the 64th minute of a 3–1 home win over Carrarese. Berardi ended his loan to Tuttocuoio with 33 appearances, including 30 as a starter, and 2 goals, but the team was relegated in Serie D.

==== Loan to Südtirol ====
On 31 August, Berardi was signed by Serie C side Südtirol on a season-long loan deal. On 10 September he made his debut for Südtirol as a substitute replacing Michael Cia in the 70th minute of a 2–2 home draw against Fermana. On 8 October he played his second match as an 89th-minute substitute in a 3–1 home win over Modena. On 15 October he played his third match again as a substitute replacing Hannes Fink in the 46th minute of a 5–0 home win over Santarcangelo. On 8 April, Berardi played his fourth match again as a substitute replacing Hannes Fink in the 58th minute of a 2–0 home win over Fano. Berardi ended his loan to Südtirol with only 4 appearances, all as a substitute.

== Career statistics ==
=== Club ===
As of 29 May 2018

Club	Season	League			Cup		Europe		Other		Total	
Club	Season	League	Apps	Goals	Apps	Goals	Apps	Goals	Apps	Goals	Apps	Goals
Pordenone (loan)	2015–16	Serie C	16	1	0	0	—		—		16	1
Tuttocuoio (loan)	2016–17	Serie C	32	2	1	0	—		—		33	2
Südtirol (loan)	2017–18	Serie C	4	0	0	0	—		—		4	0
Career total			52	3	1	0	—		—		53	3
