= Vladimir Bajić =

Serbian footballer (born 1987)

Personal information
- Full name: Vladimir Bajić
- Date of birth: 28 November 1987 (age 38)
- Place of birth: Novi Sad, SFR Yugoslavia
- Height: 1.91 m (6 ft 3 in)
- Position: Goalkeeper

Youth career
- Vojvodina

Senior career*
Years	Team	Apps	(Gls)
2005–2007	Sloga Temerin	40	(0)
2007–2009	Mladost Bački Jarak	54	(0)
2009–2011	Srem	52	(0)
2012	Novi Pazar	1	(0)
2012–2013	Banat Zrenjanin	33	(0)
2013–2016	Borac Čačak	53	(0)
2016–2017	Radnički Niš	22	(0)
2017–2018	Borac Čačak	23	(0)
2018–2020	Levadiakos	40	(0)
2020–2021	AE Larissa	7	(0)
2021–2023	Niki Volos	50	(0)
2023–2024	Napredak Kruševac	8	(0)
- * Club domestic league appearances and goals as of 27 December 2024

Vladimir Bajić (Serbian Cyrillic: Владимир Бајић; born 28 November 1987) is a Serbian professional footballer who plays as a goalkeeper.

== Career ==
He started his career in Sloga Temerin, and later he played for Mladost Bački Jarak, Srem, Novi Pazar, where he made his SuperLiga debut, and Banat. On 21 July 2013 he joined the Borac Čačak, in Borac Čačak was three seasons.

On July 23, 2016, he signed a 2-year contract with Serbian SuperLiga side FK Radnički Niš.
