= Marko Drobnjak =

Serbian footballer (born 1995)

Personal information
- Full name: Marko Drobnjak
- Date of birth: 17 May 1995 (age 31)
- Place of birth: Čačak, FR Yugoslavia
- Height: 1.96 m (6 ft 5 in)
- Position: Goalkeeper

Team information
- Current team: Marsaxlokk
- Number: 95

Youth career
- 2003–2014: Borac Čačak

Senior career*
Years	Team	Apps	(Gls)
2013–2017	Borac Čačak	1	(0)
2014	→ Polet Ljubić (loan)	0	(0)
2016	→ Polet Ljubić (loan)	14	(0)
2016	→ Radnički Kragujevac (loan)	0	(0)
2017	→ Polet Ljubić (loan)	15	(0)
2017	Polet Ljubić	14	(0)
2017–2019	Železiarne Podbrezová	1	(0)
2019	Zlatibor	0	(0)
2019	Jošanica		
2020–2021	Novi Pazar	36	(0)
2021–2022	Sevan	2	(0)
2022	Radnički Niš	5	(0)
2022–	Marsaxlokk	48	(0)

International career
2013–2014	Serbia U19		
2014	Serbia U20		
- * Club domestic league appearances and goals as of 16 October 2024

Marko Drobnjak (Serbian Cyrillic: Марко Дробњак; born 17 May 1995) is a Serbian professional footballer who plays as a goalkeeper for Marsaxlokk.

== Club career ==
=== Borac Čačak ===
Born in Čačak, Drobnjak started playing football with local club Borac at the age of 8, and later passed the whole youth school of the same club until 2013 when he joined the first team as a third choice goalkeeper. He also stayed with youth team until 2014, and after he overgrown that level he definitely joined the first team. He also signed his first, four-and-a-half-year professional contract with his home club on 5 February 2014. After the first half-season he spent as a third choice behind captain a Nikola Petrić and Vladimir Bajić, Drobnjak was mostly used as a back-up option for Bajić during the spring, but he was also loaned to Polet Ljubić on dual registration eventually. He made his SuperLiga debut for Borac Čačak in 20 fixture of the 2014–15 season in away match against OFK Beograd, played on 21 March 2015, replacing injured Vladimir Bajić in 67 minute. At the beginning of 2016, Drobnjak moved on loan to Polet Ljubić until the end of 2015–16 season. After the end of same season, he was nominated for the most prospective goalkeeper in his home town. He started the 2016–17 season with the first team of Borac Čačak, but after Branimir Aleksić joined the club, Drobnjak left on six-month loan to Radnički Kragujevac. In summer 2017 Drobnjak returned to his home club and started new season under Igor Spasić, but later mutually terminated the contract and moved to Polet Ljubić as a single player.

=== Železiarne Podbrezová ===
Ending of November 2017, Drobnjak signed a two-and-a-half-year contract with the Slovak Super Liga side Železiarne Podbrezová. He was ordered number 1 jersey and was usually used as a back-up for Martin Kuciak in early 2018. Drobnjak has also played with Podbrezová reserves in the Slovak second tier. Drobnjak made his official debut in the Slovak top level league in 1–0 away defeat against Zemplín Michalovce on 12 May 2018.

=== FK Jošanica ===
In August 2019, FK Jošanica announced on Facebook, that Drobnjak had joined the club.

=== Sevan FC ===
On 27 June 2021, Drobnjak signed with Sevan FC.

== International career ==
After he was a member of Serbia U19 national team level between 2013 and 2014, Drobnjak was also called in U20 squad under coach Veljko Paunović in 2014.

== Career statistics ==
As of 12 May 2018

Appearances and goals by club, season and competition
Club	Season	League			Cup		Continental		Other		Total	
Club	Season	Division	Apps	Goals	Apps	Goals	Apps	Goals	Apps	Goals	Apps	Goals
Borac Čačak	2013–14	Serbian First League	0	0	0	0	—		—		0	0
Borac Čačak	2014–15	Serbian SuperLiga	1	0	0	0	—		—		1	0
Borac Čačak	2015–16	Serbian SuperLiga	0	0	0	0	—		—		0	0
Borac Čačak	2016–17	Serbian SuperLiga	0	0	0	0	—		—		0	0
Borac Čačak	Total		1	0	0	0	—		—		1	0
Polet Ljubić	2014–15 (loan)	Serbian League West	0	0	—		—		—		0	0
Polet Ljubić	2015–16 (loan)	Serbian League West	14	0	—		—		—		14	0
Polet Ljubić	2016–17 (loan)	Serbian League West	15	0	—		—		—		15	0
Polet Ljubić	2017–18	Serbian League West	14	0	—		—		—		14	0
Polet Ljubić	Total		43	0	—		—		—		43	0
Radnički Kragujevac	2016–17 (loan)	Serbian League West	0	0	1	0	—		1	0	2	0
Podbrezová II	2017–18	2. Liga	5	0	—		—		—		5	0
Podbrezová	2017–18	Slovak Super Liga	1	0	—		—		—		1	0
Career total			60	0	1	0	—		1	0	62	0
