= Kosta Aleksić =

Serbian football player

Personal information
- Date of birth: 9 March 1998 (age 28)
- Place of birth: Novi Sad, FR Yugoslavia
- Height: 1.83 m (6 ft 0 in)
- Positions: Forward; attacking midfielder

Team information
- Current team: Panetolikos
- Number: 14

Youth career
- Vojvodina

Senior career*
Years	Team	Apps	(Gls)
2017–2018	Bečej	44	(17)
2018–2020	Čukarički	13	(0)
2019	→ Bečej (loan)	13	(2)
2020	→ Napredak Kruševac (loan)	5	(0)
2020–2021	Inđija	38	(1)
2021	Sevan	5	(1)
2022–2023	Iraklis	47	(23)
2023–2024	Panserraikos	31	(7)
2024–2025	Iğdır	18	(3)
2025	→ Boluspor (loan)	20	(2)
2025–	Panetolikos	38	(6)

International career^{‡}
2021	Serbia	2	(0)
- * Club domestic league appearances and goals as of 20 September 2026 ‡ National team caps and goals as of 26 August 2023

Kosta Aleksić (Serbian Cyrillic: Коста Алексић; born 9 March 1998) is a Serbian professional footballer who plays as a forward for Greek Super League club Panetolikos.

== Club career ==
After a two-year stint with Iraklis, he joined Panserraikos on a two-year deal, on 3 August 2023.

== International career ==
Aleksić made his debut for Serbia in a January 2021 friendly match away against the Dominican Republic.

== Career statistics ==
Club	Season	League			Cup		Continental		Other		Total	
Club	Season	Division	Apps	Goals	Apps	Goals	Apps	Goals	Apps	Goals	Apps	Goals
Čukarički	2018–19	Serbian SuperLiga	4	0	1	0	—		—		5	0
Čukarički	2019–20	Serbian SuperLiga	9	0	2	0	2	0	—		13	0
Čukarički	Total		13	0	3	0	2	0	—		18	0
Bečej (loan)	2018–19	Serbian First League	13	2	—		—		—		13	2
Napredak Kruševac (loan)	2019–20	Serbian SuperLiga	5	0	—		—		—		5	0
Inđija	2020–21	Serbian SuperLiga	36	1	1	1	—		—		37	2
Sevan	2021–22	Armenian Premier League	5	1	1	0	—		—		6	1
Iraklis	2021–22	Super League Greece 2	21	4	—		—		—		21	4
Iraklis	2022–23	Super League Greece 2	26	19	1	0	—		—		27	19
Iraklis	Total		47	23	1	0	—		—		48	23
Panserraikos	2023–24	Super League Greece	28	7	4	2	—		—		32	9
Iğdır	2024–25	TFF 1. Lig	18	3	1	0	—		—		19	4
Boluspor (loan)	2024–25	TFF 1. Lig	20	2	1	0	—		—		21	2
Panetolikos	2025–26	Super League Greece	33	5	4	0	—		—		37	5
Career total			218	44	16	3	2	0	0	0	236	47
