= Ebrima Jatta (footballer, born 2002) =

Gambian footballer (born 2002)

Personal information
- Date of birth: 20 January 2002 (age 24)
- Place of birth: Gambia
- Height: 1.86 m (6 ft 1 in)
- Positions: Midfielder; forward

Team information
- Current team: Vushtrria
- Number: 9

Senior career*
| Years | Team | Apps | (Gls) |
| –2021 | Real de Banjul | | |
| 2021 | Sevan | 12 | (2) |
| 2022–2024 | Ittihad Kalba | 1 | (0) |
| 2024–2025 | Dukagjini | 39 | (2) |
| 2025– | Vushtrria | 0 | (0) |
- * Club domestic league appearances and goals as of 26 June 2025

Ebrima Jatta (born 10 January 2002) is a Gambian professional footballer who plays as a midfielder or forward for Vushtrria in Kosovo.

== Career ==
In 2021, Jatta signed for Armenian side Sevan. Before the second half of 2021–22, he signed for Ittihad Kalba in the United Arab Emirates. On 25 March 2022, he debuted for Al Ittihad (Kalba) during a 1–0 win over Ajman.
