= Filip Duranski =

Macedonian footballer

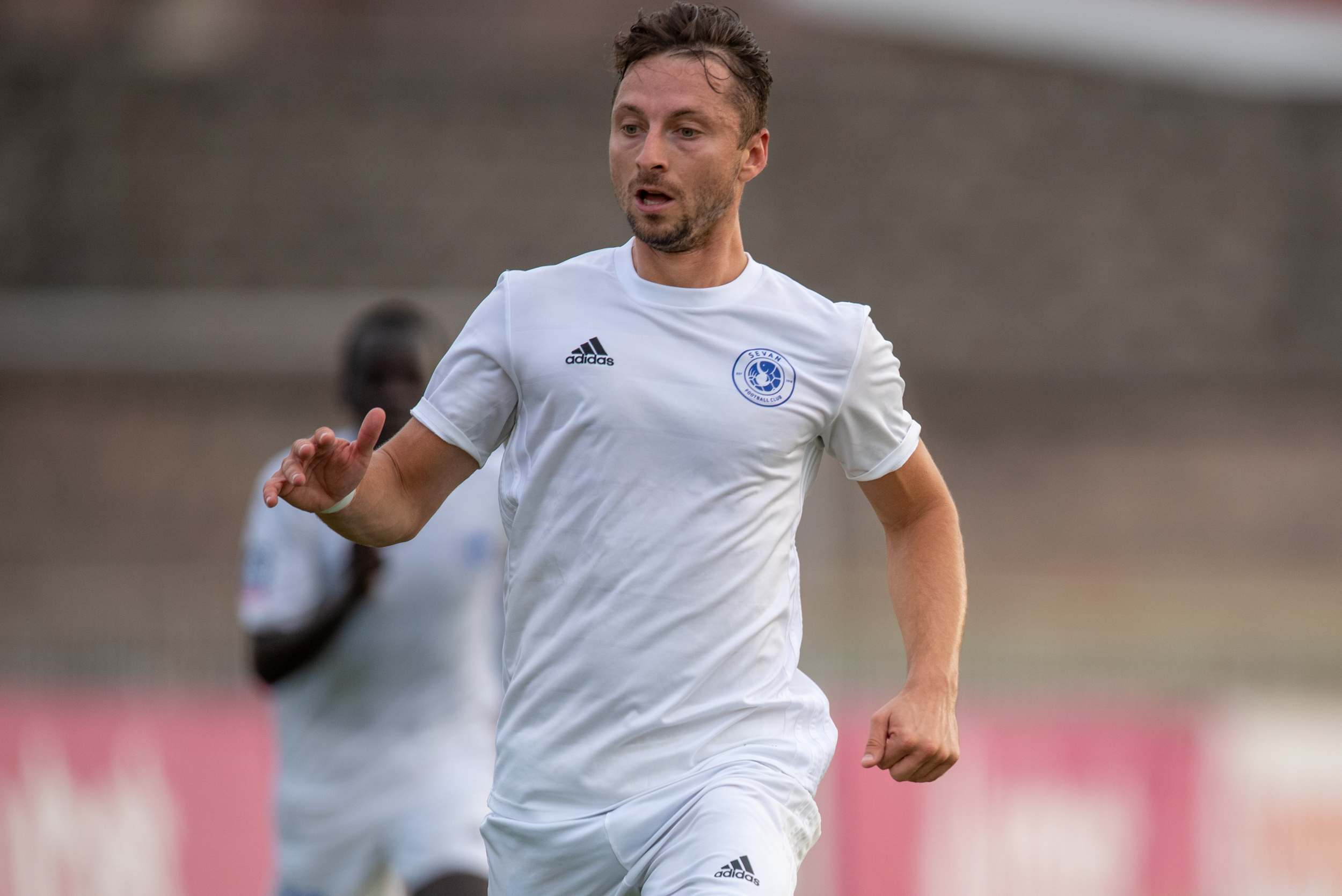

Personal information
- Full name: Filip Duranski
- Date of birth: 17 July 1991 (age 35)
- Place of birth: Skopje, SR Macedonia, SFR Yugoslavia
- Height: 1.75 m (5 ft 9 in)
- Position: Midfielder

Team information
- Current team: Vardar
- Number: 23

Youth career
- Slavia Prague

Senior career*
Years	Team	Apps	(Gls)
2009–2012	Slavia Prague	2	(0)
2011	→ Mladá Boleslav (loan)	0	(0)
2012	Horizont Turnovo	9	(0)
2013–2014	Rabotnički	3	(0)
2014–2016	Sileks	55	(7)
2016–2018	Rabotnički	56	(5)
2018–2019	Sileks	51	(4)
2020	Sereď	20	(0)
2021	Sileks	9	(0)
2021	Sevan FC	13	(0)
2022	KF Egnatia	15	(0)
2022-2023	Olympiakos Nicosia	1	(0)
2023	FK Skopje	12	(0)
2023–	Vardar	54	(2)

International career^{‡}
2009–2010	North Macedonia U21	5	(0)
- * Club domestic league appearances and goals as of 23 May 2026 ‡ National team caps and goals as of 17 April 2017

Filip Duranski (born 17 July 1991 in Skopje) is a Macedonian footballer who currently playing for FK Vardar in the Macedonian First Football League.
