= Ghukas Poghosyan =

Armenian footballer (born 1994)

Personal information
- Full name: Ghukas Poghosyan
- Date of birth: 6 February 1994 (age 32)
- Place of birth: Armenia
- Height: 1.77 m (5 ft 10 in)
- Position: Forward

Senior career*
Years	Team	Apps	(Gls)
2011–2016	Pyunik	82	(11)
2016–2017	Shirak	18	(3)
2017	Banants	14	(1)
2018	Gorodeya	11	(0)
2018–2019	Alashkert	21	(3)
2020	Van	6	(4)
2020	Alashkert	3	(0)
2021	Lori	4	(1)
2021	Sevan	8	(0)

International career^{‡}
2010	Armenia U17	2	(0)
2011–2012	Armenia U19	6	(0)
2013–2016	Armenia U21	10	(0)
2012	Armenia	1	(0)
- * Club domestic league appearances and goals as of 31 December 2021 ‡ National team caps and goals as of 29 March 2016

Ghukas Poghosyan (Armenian: Ղուկաս Պողոսյան; born 6 February 1994) is an Armenian former footballer.

== Career ==
=== Club ===
On 31 May 2016, Poghosyan signed a two-year contract with FC Shirak. In 2017 he was transferred to FC Banants.

On 17 February 2021, Poghosyan signed for Lori.

=== International ===
Poghosyan has played in one match for the Armenian senior team, coming on as a substitute in Armenia's 0–2 loss to Serbia on 28 February 2012.
