= Bicou Bissainthe =

Haitian footballer (born 1999)

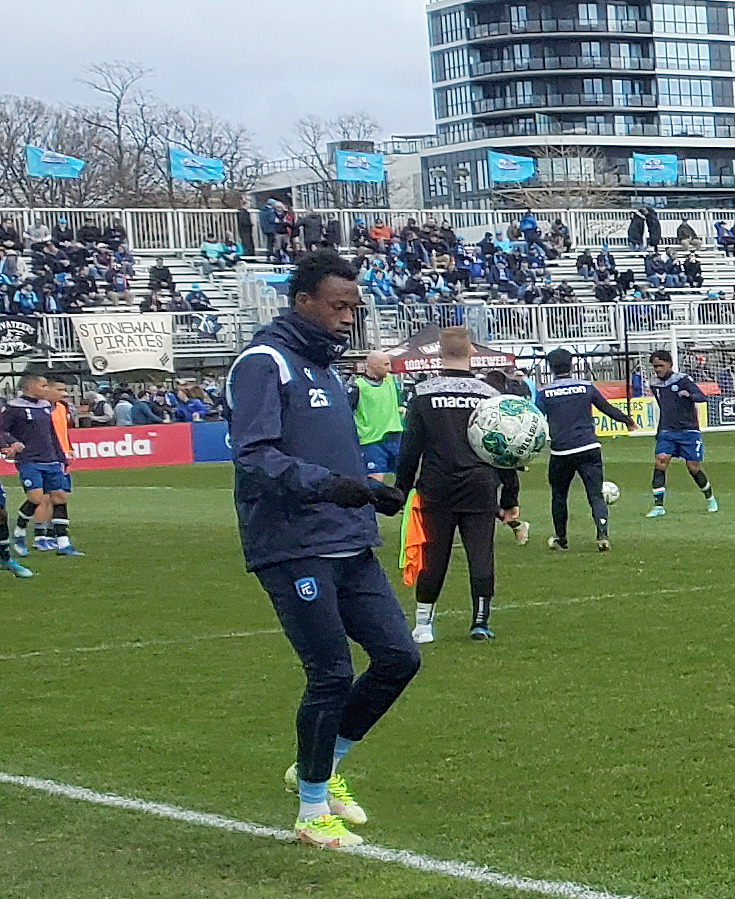
- Bissainthe with Edmonton in 2022

Personal information
- Date of birth: 15 March 1999 (age 27)
- Place of birth: Cap-Haïtien, Haiti
- Height: 1.88 m (6 ft 2 in)
- Position: Centre-back

Team information
- Current team: Haiphong
- Number: 66

Senior career*
Years	Team	Apps	(Gls)
2016–2019	Real Hope FA		
2019	North Texas SC	16	(0)
2020–2021	Real Hope FA		
2021–2022	Sevan	10	(1)
2022	Pacific FC	0	(0)
2022	→ FC Edmonton (loan)	21	(2)
2023–	Haiphong	44	(3)

International career^{‡}
2018	Haiti U20	4	(3)
2021	Haiti U23	2	(0)
2019–	Haiti	6	(0)
- * Club domestic league appearances and goals as of 23 February 2024 ‡ National team caps and goals as of 4 September 2021

Bicou Bissainthe (born 15 March 1999) is a Haitian professional footballer who plays as a centre-back for V.League 1 club Haiphong.

== Career ==
In January 2019, Bissainthe joined North Texas SC ahead of their inaugural season in USL League One. He made his league debut for the club on March 30, 2019, coming on as a 68th-minute substitute for Arturo Rodriguez in a 3–2 home victory over Chattanooga Red Wolves SC.

On 5 August 2021, Armenian Premier League club Sevan announced the signing of Bissainthe.

=== FC Edmonton ===
On 22 April 2022, it was announced that Bissainthe had signed with Canadian Premier League club Pacific FC and would be immediately loaned to FC Edmonton. The club was in a state of crisis the season Bissanthe joined, with no ownership and most players also being at the club on loan (the league gave Edmonton a special exemption from loan player limits). Nevertheless, the Eddies fought bravely in a difficult season, and in their 12th game of the year Bissainthe scored the only goal in a game against Atlético Ottawa to give Edmonton their first victory of the year.

=== Haiphong FC ===
In January 2023, it was announced that Bissainthe had signed with V.League 1 club Haiphong. The following day, he made his debut for the club, in the 2022 Vietnamese Super Cup against Hanoi. Bissainthe scored his first goal for Haiphong in a 3–2 loss to Dong A Thanh Hoa on 23 February 2024.

== Career statistics ==
=== International ===
As of match played 4 September 2021

Appearances and goals by national team and year
National team	Year	Apps	Goals
Haiti	2019	3	0
Haiti	2020	0	0
Haiti	2021	4	0
Total		7	0

== Honours ==
North Texas

- USL League One: 2019

Haiphong

- Vietnamese Super Cup runner-up: 2022
