= Narek Aslanyan =

Armenian international footballer

Personal information
- Date of birth: 4 June 1996 (age 30)
- Place of birth: Yerevan, Armenia
- Height: 1.77 m (5 ft 10 in)
- Position: Midfielder

Team information
- Current team: Sevan
- Number: 6

Senior career*
Years	Team	Apps	(Gls)
2012–2018	Pyunik	85	(7)
2018–2021	Gandzasar Kapan	21	(0)
2021–	Sevan	0	(0)

International career^{‡}
2017–	Armenia	1	(0)
- * Club domestic league appearances and goals as of 14 August 2021 ‡ National team caps and goals as of 27 March 2018

Narek Aslanyan (born 4 June 1996) is an Armenian international footballer who plays for Sevan FC, as a midfielder.

== Career ==
Born in Yerevan, he has played club football for Pyunik.

He made his international debut for Armenia in 2017.
