= Alik Arakelyan =

Armenian footballer (born 1996)

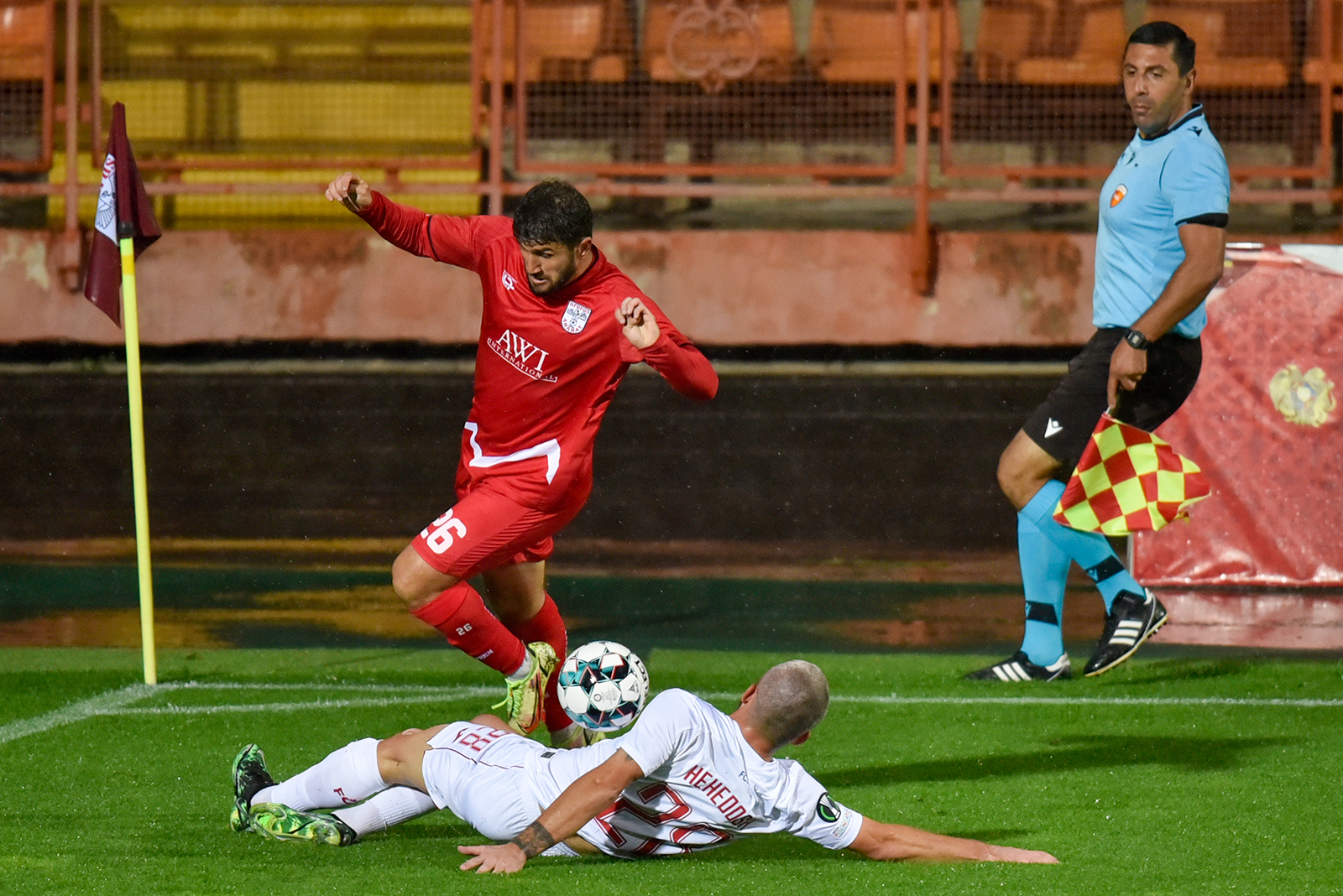

Personal information
- Full name: Alik Arakelyan
- Date of birth: 21 May 1996 (age 30)
- Place of birth: Yerevan, Armenia
- Height: 1.68 m (5 ft 6 in)
- Position: Midfielder

Team information
- Current team: Lernayin Artsakh
- Number: 18

Senior career*
Years	Team	Apps	(Gls)
–2013	Mika II		
2012–2015	Mika	61	(3)
2015–2021	Pyunik	129	(18)
2021–2023	Ararat Yerevan	44	(5)
2023-	Lernayin Artsakh	10	(0)

International career^{‡}
2012	Armenia U17	2	(0)
2013–2014	Armenia U19	5	(0)
2015–2018	Armenia U21	16	(1)
2018–	Armenia	1	(0)
- * Club domestic league appearances and goals as of 3 August 2023 ‡ National team caps and goals as of 06:46, 21 November 2018 (UTC)

Alik Arakelyan (Armenian: Ալիկ Արայիկի Առաքելյան; born 21 May 1996) is an Armenian footballer who plays as a midfielder for Lernayin Artsakh and the Armenia national team.

== Career ==
=== Club ===
On 15 June 2021, Arakelyan left FC Pyunik when his contract expired after playing 153 games for the club.

On 22 June 2021, Arakelyan signed with Ararat Yerevan. On 10 December 2022, Ararat Yerevan announced that Arakelyan had left by mutual consent.

=== International ===
Arakelyan made his international debut for Armenia on 19 November 2018, coming on as a substitute in the 88th minute for Hovhannes Hambardzumyan in the 2018–19 UEFA Nations League D match against Liechtenstein, which finished as a 2–2 away draw.

== Career statistics ==
=== International ===
As of 19 November 2018

Armenia
Year	Apps	Goals
2018	1	0
Total	1	0
