= Sevan FC =

Armenian football club

- Full name: Sevan Football Club
- Founded: 2018; 7 years ago, as Junior Sevan Football Club
- Dissolved: 1 December 2021
- Ground: Sevan City Stadium, Sevan
- Capacity: 500
- President: Hayk Grigoryan
- Manager: Pambos Christodoulou
- League: Armenian Premier League
- 2021–22: Armenian Premier League, 10th of 10 (disqualified)
- Website: www.sevanfc.com
Home colours	Away colours

Sevan Football Club (Armenian: Սևան Ֆորտբոլային Ակումբ), formerly Junior Sevan Football Club, was a football club based in Sevan, Armenia. It was the most recent football club that represented the Gegharkunik Province of Armenia in professional football.

== History ==
Sevan Football Club was founded in 2018 as Junior Sevan Football Club, in the town of Sevan. In its first year of foundation, Junior Sevan applied and took part in the Armenian First League. Even though it won the 2018–19 league season, the club was not granted a license for promotion to the Premier League for not having met the required standards. On 25 June 2019, the club announced that the name was changed to Sevan FC. After playing three seasons in the lower Armenian league, they were finally able to get promoted to the premier league by winning the 2020–21 Armenian First League.

On 1 December 2021, the Football Federation of Armenia Disciplinary Committee voted in favor to remove Sevan from the Armenian Premier League after they failed to turn up for two games in a row, against Alashkert and BKMA Yerevan. As a result, all of Sevan's results were excluded from the championship table.

=== League and cup ===
Season	League										National Cup	Top goalscorer	
Season	Div.	Pos.	Pl.	W	D	L	GS	GA	GD	P	National Cup	Name	League
2018–19	Armenian First League	1	33	25	6	2	90	26	+64	81	Round of 16	Sultan Aksanov	15
2019–20	Armenian First League	7	28	14	5	9	52	42	+10	47	Quarterfinal	Aram Loretsyan	15
2020–21	Armenian First League	1	27	22	2	3	75	23	+52	68	Round of 16		
2021–22	Armenian Premier League	10	0	0	0	0	0	0	0	0	First Round	-	-
December 2021–present	No Participation												

== Players ==
=== Final ever squad ===
As of 4 April 2022

Note: Flags indicate national team as defined under FIFA eligibility rules; some limited exceptions apply. Players may hold more than one non-FIFA nationality.

No.	Pos.	Nation	Player
4	MF	(Armenia) ARM	Davit Ayvazyan
5	DF	(Armenia) ARM	Vahe Muradyan
6	MF	(Armenia) ARM	Narek Aslanyan
7	FW	(Nigeria) NGA	Olaoluwa Ojetunde
9	FW	(Armenia) ARM	Mher Sahakyan
14	DF	(The Gambia) GAM	Ebrima Jatta

No.	Pos.	Nation	Player
17	FW	(Nigeria) NGA	Ibrahim Abubakar
19	FW	(Nigeria) NGA	Bernard Ovoke
22	MF	(Haiti) HAI	Bicou Bissainthe
33	GK	(Armenia) ARM	Suren Aloyan
40	DF	(Brazil) BRA	Luiz Matheus

== Managerial history ==
Former club crest used for Junior Sevan FC

- (Belarus) Syarhey Herasimets (1 August 2018 – 12 February 2019)
- (Armenia) Armen Ghulinyan (12 February 2019 – 26 April 2019)
- (Armenia) Armen Sanamyan (26 April 2019 – 31 July 2019)
- (Moldova) Vitali Culibaba (31 July 2019 – 30 August 2019)
- (Armenia) Armen Sanamyan (31 August 2019 – 6 September 2020)
- (Armenia) Armen Shahgeldyan (7 September 2020 – 1 December 2021)
