= 2021–22 FC Noah season =

Noah
2021–22 season
- CEO: Artur Sahakyan
- Manager: Viktor Bulatov (until 21 March); Igor Picușceac (from 25 March)
- Stadium: FFA Academy Stadium (until round 18); Armavir City Stadium (from round 19)
- Premier League: 6th
- Armenian Cup: Quarterfinal vs Ararat Yerevan
- Europa Conference League: First Qualifying Round vs KuPS
- Top goalscorer: League: Maksim Mayrovich (9); All: Maksim Mayrovich (9)
Home colours	Away colours	Third colours

The 2021–22 season was FC Noah's 4th season in Armenian Premier League. Noah will participate in the Armenian Premier League, Armenian Cup and the UEFA Europa Conference League.

== Season events ==
On 8 June, Noah announced the signing of Aleksandr Karapetyan from Ararat-Armenia.

On 1 July, Sargis Shahinyan joined Noah on a season-long loan deal from Ararat-Armenia.

On 7 July, Noah announced the signings of Igor Smirnov, Tigran Sargsyan and Pavel Ovchinnikov.

On 19 July, Charles Mark Ikechukwu joined Noah from West Armenia, whilst Aleksandr Golovnya joined on a season-long loan deal from Rodina Moscow on 20 July.

On 22 July, Arman Mkrtchyan left Noah by mutual consent.

On 25 July, Noah announced the signing of Grigori Matevosyan from Urartu.

On 5 September, Noah announced the signing of Artem Filippov from Rodina Moscow, and the return of Maksim Mayrovich from Akron Tolyatti. The following day, 6 September, Noah announced the signing of Albert Gabarayev from Volgar Astrakhan.

On 17 December, Noah announced the signing of Gevorg Tarakhchyan from Sevan, with Artur Kartashyan also joining Noah from Sevan the following day.

On 25 December, Noah announced the signing of Aleksejs Grjaznovs from Slovan Velvary.

On 29 December, Aleksandr Karapetyan left Noah after his contract was terminated by mutual agreement.

On 6 January, Noah announced the signing of Tarek Afqir from Șomuz Fălticeni.

On 9 January, Noah announced the signing of Vardan Shahatuni from Ararat-Armenia.

On 11 January, Noah announced the signing of Alexei Ciopa from Zimbru Chișinău.

On 24 January, Noah announced the signing of Hayk Musakhanyan from Energetik-BGU Minsk.

On 30 January, Noah announced the signing of Ilya Udodov from Dnepr Mogilev.

On 1 February, Dan Spătaru returned to Noah after leaving Ararat-Armenia.

On 7 February, Noah announced that they would play their home games for the rest of the season at the Armavir City Stadium in Armavir.

On 15 February, Noah announced the signing of Grigori Trufanov from SKA-Khabarovsk, with Evgheni Oancea joining from Sfîntul Gheorghe on the 16th, whilst Dmitri Lavrishchev rejoined the club from Lokomotiv Gomel on 17 February.

On 20 February, Noah announced the signing of Dramane Salou.

On 22 February, Noah announced the signing of Artur Miroyan.

On 19 March, Noah announced the signing of Okezie Prince Ebenezer from Zimbru Chisinau.

On 21 March, Noah announced that Head Coach Viktor Bulatov had left the club, with Igor Picușceac being confirmed as the clubs new Head Coach on 25 March.

== Squad ==
As of match played 25 May 2022

Number	Name	Nationality	Position	Date of birth (age)	Signed from	Signed in	Contract ends	Apps.	Goals
Goalkeepers
63	Gevorg Didaryan	(Armenia)	GK	17 August 2003 (aged 18)	Academy	2021		0	0
77	Vardan Shahatuni	(Armenia)	GK	13 March 1998 (aged 24)	Ararat-Armenia	2022		10	0
99	Grigori Matevosyan	(Russia)	GK	9 June 1999 (aged 22)	Urartu	2021		21	0
	Artur Miroyan	(Armenia)	GK	26 September 2000 (aged 21)	Unattached	2022		0	0
Defenders
2	Vardan Shakhbazyan	(Armenia)	DF	29 July 1999 (aged 22)	Shirak	2020		0	0
3	Artur Kartashyan	(Armenia)	DF	8 January 1997 (aged 25)	Sevan	2021		15	0
5	Ilya Udodov	(Belarus)	DF	6 December 2000 (aged 21)	Dnepr Mogilev	2022		3	0
13	Dramane Salou	(Burkina Faso)	DF	22 May 1998 (aged 24)	Salitas	2022		11	0
14	Mikhail Kovalenko	(Russia)	DF	25 January 1995 (aged 27)	Tyumen	2019		46	2
17	Jordy Monroy	(Armenia)	DF	3 January 1996 (aged 26)	Boyacá Chicó	2020		62	1
18	Okezie Prince Ebenezer	(Nigeria)	DF	28 February 2001 (aged 21)	Zimbru Chisinau	2022		7	0
27	Alexei Ciopa	(Moldova)	DF	27 October 1998 (aged 23)	Zimbru Chișinău	2022		4	0
28	Grigori Trufanov	(Russia)	DF	13 June 1997 (aged 24)	SKA-Khabarovsk	2022		5	0
92	Saná Gomes	(Guinea-Bissau)	DF	10 October 1999 (aged 22)	Sertanense	2020		52	2
97	Albert Gabarayev	(Russia)	DF	28 September 1997 (aged 24)	Volgar Astrakhan	2021		22	1
Midfielders
7	Gevorg Tarakhchyan	(Armenia)	MF	15 March 2002 (aged 20)	Sevan	2021		9	0
8	Sargis Shahinyan	(Armenia)	MF	10 September 1995 (aged 26)	on loan from Ararat-Armenia	2021	2022	32	0
11	Yaroslav Matviyenko	(Russia)	MF	22 March 1998 (aged 24)	Yenisey Krasnoyarsk	2021		9	2
16	Tarek Afqir	(Morocco)	MF	16 February 2002 (aged 20)	Șomuz Fălticeni	2022		0	0
19	Ashot Adamyan	(Armenia)	MF	15 June 1997 (aged 24)	Gandzasar Kapan	2021		6	0
20	Alex Oliveira	(Portugal)	MF	29 August 2000 (aged 21)	União de Leiria	2021		55	6
23	Aleksejs Grjaznovs	(Latvia)	MF	1 October 1997 (aged 24)	Slovan Velvary	2021		7	0
25	Charles Ikechukwu	(Nigeria)	MF	21 May 1997 (aged 25)	West Armenia	2021		18	2
32	Evgheni Oancea	(Moldova)	MF	5 January 1996 (aged 26)	Sfîntul Gheorghe	2022		16	1
78	Yura Karamyan	(Armenia)	MF		Academy	2021		0	0
94	Dan Spătaru	(Moldova)	MF	24 May 1994 (aged 28)	Unattached	2022		43	6
Forwards
6	Hayk Musakhanyan	(Belarus)	FW	20 March 1998 (aged 24)	Energetik-BGU Minsk	2022		15	0
9	Andrei Titov	(Russia)	FW	5 March 1996 (aged 26)	Akron Tolyatti	2021		16	0
10	Maksim Mayrovich	(Russia)	FW	6 February 1996 (aged 26)	Akron Tolyatti	2021		69	25
21	Dmitri Lavrishchev	(Russia)	FW	23 December 1998 (aged 23)	Lokomotiv Gomel	2022		54	6
22	Gegham Harutyunyan	(Armenia)	FW	23 August 1990 (aged 31)	Gandzasar Kapan	2021		28	4
65	Raymond Gyasi	(Ghana)	FW	5 August 1994 (aged 27)	Kazma	2021		29	2
Players away on loan
18	Tigran Sargsyan	(Armenia)	MF	14 August 2003 (aged 18)	Pyunik	2021		4	0
Players who left during the season
1	Nikolay Novikov	(Russia)	GK	2 March 2000 (aged 22)	loan from Rodina Moscow	2021	2021	0	0
5	Igor Smirnov	(Russia)	DF	2 February 1997 (aged 25)	Zvezda St.Petersburg	2021		15	0
7	Eduards Emsis	(Latvia)	MF	23 February 1996 (aged 26)	Jelgava	2020		51	1
10	Benik Hovhannisyan	(Armenia)	MF	1 May 1993 (aged 29)	Alashkert	2021		71	3
12	Aleksandr Golovnya	(Russia)	DF	27 October 1998 (aged 23)	loan from Rodina Moscow	2021		2	0
13	Pavel Kireyenko	(Russia)	FW	14 June 1994 (aged 27)	Tom Tomsk	2021		34	8
21	Vadim Paireli	(Moldova)	MF	8 November 1995 (aged 26)	Sheriff Tiraspol	2021		22	4
27	Jefferson Oliveira	(Brazil)	DF	25 February 1992 (aged 30)	Persik Kediri	2021		20	0
69	Denys Dedechko	(Ukraine)	MF	2 July 1987 (aged 34)	Ararat Yerevan	2020		35	2
71	Artem Filippov	(Russia)	MF	17 July 1997 (aged 24)	Rodina Moscow	2021		10	0
87	Aleksandr Karapetyan	(Armenia)	FW	23 December 1987 (aged 34)	Ararat-Armenia	2021		14	4
88	Dobrivoje Velemir	(Serbia)	MF	14 March 1997 (aged 25)	Bačka	2021		9	0
96	Petros Avetisyan	(Armenia)	MF	7 January 1996 (aged 26)	Tobol	2021		25	10
98	Pavel Ovchinnikov	(Russia)	GK	24 March 1998 (aged 24)	Veles Moscow	2021		5	0
99	Arman Mkrtchyan	(Armenia)	DF	9 July 1999 (aged 22)	Lori	2020		3	0

== Transfers ==
=== In ===
Date	Position	Nationality	Name	From	Fee	Ref.
8 June 2021	FW	(Armenia)	Aleksandr Karapetyan	Ararat-Armenia	Undisclosed	
9 July 2021	FW	(Armenia)	Pavel Ovchinnikov	Veles Moscow	Undisclosed	
9 July 2021	DF	(Russia)	Igor Smirnov	Zvezda St.Petersburg	Undisclosed	
9 July 2021	MF	(Armenia)	Tigran Sargsyan	Pyunik	Undisclosed	
19 July 2021	MF	(Nigeria)	Charles Mark Ikechukwu	West Armenia	Undisclosed	
25 July 2021	GK	(Russia)	Grigori Matevosyan	Urartu	Undisclosed	
5 September 2021	MF	(Russia)	Artem Filippov	Rodina Moscow	Undisclosed	
5 September 2021	FW	(Russia)	Maksim Mayrovich	Akron Tolyatti	Undisclosed	
6 September 2021	DF	(Russia)	Albert Gabarayev	Volgar Astrakhan	Undisclosed	
17 December 2021	MF	(Armenia)	Gevorg Tarakhchyan	Sevan	Undisclosed	
18 December 2021	DF	(Armenia)	Artur Kartashyan	Sevan	Undisclosed	
25 December 2021	MF	(Latvia)	Aleksejs Grjaznovs	Slovan Velvary	Undisclosed	
6 January 2022	MF	(Morocco)	Tarek Afqir	Șomuz Fălticeni	Undisclosed	
9 January 2022	GK	(Armenia)	Vardan Shahatuni	Ararat-Armenia	Undisclosed	
11 January 2022	DF	(Moldova)	Alexei Ciopa	Zimbru Chișinău	Undisclosed	
24 January 2022	FW	(Belarus)	Hayk Musakhanyan	Energetik-BGU Minsk	Undisclosed	
30 January 2022	DF	(Belarus)	Ilya Udodov	Dnepr Mogilev	Undisclosed	
1 February 2022	MF	(Moldova)	Dan Spătaru	Unattached	Free	
15 February 2022	DF	(Russia)	Grigori Trufanov	SKA-Khabarovsk	Undisclosed	
16 February 2022	MF	(Moldova)	Evgheni Oancea	Sfîntul Gheorghe	Undisclosed	
17 February 2022	FW	(Russia)	Dmitri Lavrishchev	Lokomotiv Gomel	Undisclosed	
20 February 2022	DF	(Burkina Faso)	Dramane Salou	Salitas	Undisclosed	
22 February 2022	GK	(Armenia)	Artur Miroyan	Unattached	Free	
19 March 2022	DF	(Nigeria)	Okezie Prince Ebenezer	Zimbru Chisinau	Undisclosed	

=== Loans in ===
Date from	Position	Nationality	Name	From	Date to	Ref.
1 March 2021	GK	(Russia)	Nikolay Novikov	Rodina Moscow	21 December 2021	
1 July 2021	MF	(Armenia)	Sargis Shahinyan	Ararat-Armenia	End of season	
20 July 2021	DF	(Russia)	Aleksandr Golovnya	Rodina Moscow	21 December 2021	

=== Loans out ===
Date from	Position	Nationality	Name	To	Date to	Ref.
11 February 2022	MF	(Armenia)	Tigran Sargsyan	BKMA Yerevan	End of season	

=== Released ===
Date	Position	Nationality	Name	Joined	Date	Ref.
19 June 2021	GK	(Armenia)	Samvel Hunanyan			
19 June 2021	GK	(Italy)	Valerio Vimercati	Ararat-Armenia	24 June 2021	
19 June 2021	DF	(Armenia)	Artur Stepanyan	BKMA Yerevan	20 February 2022	
19 June 2021	DF	(Russia)	Vladislav Kryuchkov	Alashkert	16 July 2021	
19 June 2021	DF	(Russia)	Alan Tatayev	Mashuk-KMV Pyatigorsk		
19 June 2021	MF	(Guinea-Bissau)	Helistano Manga	Rodos	22 September 2021	
19 June 2021	MF	(Russia)	Kirill Bor	Kolomna		
19 June 2021	MF	(Russia)	Nikita Dubchak			
21 June 2021	MF	(Russia)	Yuri Gareginyan	Pyunik	21 June 2021	
30 June 2021	MF	(Russia)	Vladimir Azarov	Akron Tolyatti		
30 June 2021	FW	(Russia)	Maksim Mayrovich	Akron Tolyatti		
22 July 2021	DF	(Armenia)	Arman Mkrtchyan	Noravank	25 July 2021	
11 December 2021	MF	(Armenia)	Benik Hovhannisyan	Van	4 February 2022	
11 December 2021	MF	(Ukraine)	Denys Dedechko	Narva Trans	4 February 2022	
16 December 2021	DF	(Brazil)	Jefferson	A.O. Ypato	1 July 2022	
21 December 2021	GK	(Russia)	Pavel Ovchinnikov	Olimp-Dolgoprudny-2	22 February 2022	
21 December 2021	MF	(Russia)	Artem Filippov			
21 December 2021	MF	(Serbia)	Dobrivoje Velemir	Tekstilac Odžaci		
24 December 2021	MF	(Moldova)	Vadim Paireli	Sfîntul Gheorghe	9 February 2022	
29 December 2021	FW	(Armenia)	Aleksandr Karapetyan	Alashkert	5 February 2022	
31 December 2021	DF	(Russia)	Igor Smirnov	Zvezda St.Petersburg	4 February 2022	
17 January 2022	MF	(Latvia)	Eduards Emsis	Lahti	21 January 2022	
28 January 2022	FW	(Russia)	Pavel Kireyenko	Caspiy		
15 February 2022	MF	(Armenia)	Petros Avetisyan	Shakhter Karagandy	16 February 2022	
4 June 2022	FW	(Russia)	Maksim Mayrovich	Urartu	28 June 2023	

== Friendlies ==
26 June 2021	Urartu	6–1	Noah	Yerevan
18:30 (UTC+4)	Miranyan 7', 30', 45'; N.Antwi 10'; U.Iwu 48'; G.Tarakhchyan 82'	Report	Gyasi 13'	Stadium: Urartu Stadium

1 July 2021	Noah	2–2	Urartu	Yerevan
(UTC+4)	Avetisyan	Report	Goal

23 July 2021	Noah	4–0	BKMA Yerevan	Yerevan
(UTC+4)	Gyasi 16'; Dedechko 40'; Avetisyan 74'; Harutyunyan 84'	Report

24 July 2021	Noah	2–0	Urartu	Yerevan
(UTC+4)	T.Sargsyan 32'; Titov 60'	Report

22 January 2022	Noah	1–2	Van	Vagharshapat
13:00 (UTC+4)	S.Gomes	Report	Trialist; Badoyan	Stadium: Etchmiadzin Academy Stadium

29 January 2022	Noah	1–1	Noravank	Vagharshapat
13:00 (UTC+4)	C.Ikechukwu 28'	Report	Bashilov 65'	Stadium: Etchmiadzin Academy Stadium

5 February 2022	Noah	1–0	BKMA Yerevan	Vagharshapat
(UTC+4)	C.Ikechukwu 58'	Report		Stadium: Etchmiadzin Academy Stadium

9 February 2022	Noah	1–1	Noravank	Vagharshapat
13:00 (UTC+4)	C.Ikechukwu 22'	Report	B.Cham 38'	Stadium: Etchmiadzin Academy Stadium

13 February 2022	Noah	2–0	Urartu II	Yerevan
(UTC+4)	Harutyunyan 72'; A.Adamyan 82'	Report

17 February 2022	Noah	6–2	Shirak	Yerevan
(UTC+4)	Harutyunyan 2'; S.Shahinyan 8'; Mayrovich 54'; Trialist 74'; C.Ikechukwu 76', 87'	Report	L.Gevorgyan 49'; L.Mryan 84'

== Competitions ==
=== Overall record ===
Competition	First match	Last match	Starting round	Final position	Record							
Competition	First match	Last match	Starting round	Final position	Pld	W	D	L	GF	GA	GD	Win %
Premier League	2 August 2021	28 May 2022	Matchday 1	6th	32	9	12	11	38	43	−5	28.13
Armenian Cup	25 November 2021	25 November 2021	Quarterfinal	Quarterfinal	1	0	0	1	0	1	−1	0.00
UEFA Europa Conference League	8 July 2021	15 July 2021	First qualifying round	First qualifying round	2	1	0	1	1	5	−4	50.00
Total					35	10	12	13	39	49	−10	28.57

Last updated: 25 May 2022
Source: Competitions

=== Premier League ===
==== Results summary ====
Overall								Home						Away					
Pld	W	D	L	GF	GA	GD	Pts	W	D	L	GF	GA	GD	W	D	L	GF	GA	GD
32	9	12	11	38	43	−5	39	4	7	5	20	17	+3	5	5	6	18	26	−8

Last updated: 25 May 2022.
Source: See Results

==== Results by round ====
Round	1	2	3	4	5	6	7	8	9	10	11	12	13	14	15	16	17	18	19	20	21	22	23	24	25	26	27	28	29	30	31	32	33	34	35	36
Ground	A	A	H	A	A	A	A	H	H	A	H	A	H	H	H (Note: Between matchday 15 and 16, Sevan were expelled from the league.)	H	A	A	H	A	H	H	A	H	H	A	H	H	A	H	A	A	H	A	H	A
Result	L	W	L	L	D	W	W	V	D	D	W	L	L	W	W	D	V	D	L	D	L	L	L	W	D	D	V	D	W	D	L	W	D	L	D	P
Position	10	8	8	8	8	6	5	5	5	5	5	5	5	4	4	4	4	5	5	5	5	6	6	5	5	5	6	6	5	5	5	5	5	5	5	6

Updated to match(es) played on 28 May 2022. Source: See Results
A = Away; H = Home; W = Win; D = Draw; L = Loss; V = Void

==== Results ====
2 August 2021 1	Ararat Yerevan	7–1	Noah	Yerevan
19:00 (UTC+4)	Arakelyan 19'; Déblé 34', 42'; Y.Silue 37', 54', 61'; H.Nazaryan (yellow card) 51'; E.Malakyan 74'	Report	Kireyenko 24' (yellow card) 40'; Kovalenko (red card) 25'; Oliveira (yellow card) 45'	Stadium: Republican Stadium; Attendance: 300; Referee: Henrik Nalbandyan

13 August 2021 3	BKMA Yerevan	1–2	Noah	Yerevan
19:00 (UTC+4)	V.Samsonyan (yellow card) 60'; G.Petrsoyan 78'	Report	Harutyunyan 16', 29'; Emsis (yellow card) 25' (yellow-red card) 82'; Dedechko (yellow card) 51'; S.Gomes (yellow card) 69'; Hovhannisyan (yellow card) 81'	Stadium: FFA Academy Stadium; Attendance: 400; Referee: Artur Safaryan

20 August 2021 4	Noah	1–2	Pyunik	Yerevan
19:00 (UTC+4)	Karapetyan 35'; Hovhannisyan (yellow card) 67'; Harutyunyan (yellow card) 90+4'	Report	Caraballo 23'; Vardanyan (yellow card) 45'; Harutyunyan 83'; Firmino (yellow card) 90+4'	Stadium: FFA Academy Stadium; Attendance: 700; Referee: Ashot Ghaltakchyan

25 August 2021 5	Ararat-Armenia	5–2	Noah	Yerevan
17:00 (UTC+4)	Lima 17', 49' (pen.) (yellow card) 66'; Alemão (yellow card) 32'; Otubanjo (yellow card) 52' (goal) 59'; Narsingh (yellow card) 55'; Eza 85'; Z.Shaghoyan 88' (yellow card) 90'	Report	Karapetyan 10'; Gyasi 41'; S.Gomes (yellow card) 45'; Dedechko (yellow card) 66'; Velemir (yellow card) 85'	Stadium: FFA Academy Stadium; Attendance: 400; Referee: Artem Gasparyan

11 September 2021 6	Noravank	1–2	Noah	Charentsavan
16:00 (UTC+4)	S.Obonde (yellow card) 68'; D.Minasyan 77'; Ebert (yellow card) 90'	Report	Mayrovich 90'	Stadium: Charentsavan City Stadium; Attendance: 200; Referee: Zaven Hovhannisyan

22 September 2021 7	Van	1–2	Noah	Charentsavan
15:00 (UTC+4)	Badoyan 45'; D.Kuzkin (yellow card) 77'	Report	Karapetyan 5'; Kireyenko (yellow card) 52'; Paireli 70'; Gabarayev (yellow card) 74'; S.Gomes (yellow card) 74'; G.Matevosyan (yellow card) 82'	Stadium: Charentsavan City Stadium; Attendance: 800; Referee: Artur Safaryan

29 September 2021 8	Urartu	0–1	Noah	Yerevan
19:30 (UTC+4)	U.Iwu (yellow card) 68'	Report	G.Matevosyan (yellow card) 52'; Emsis (yellow card) 82'; Paireli 90'	Stadium: Urartu Stadium; Referee: Vardan Manukyan

15 October 2021 9	Noah	v	Sevan	Yerevan
16:00 (UTC+4)	Kireyenko 29'; Avetisyan 73' (pen.); A.Oliveira (yellow card) 79'; I.Smirnov (yellow card) 85'	Report	Rudoselsky (yellow card) 15'; L.Matheus (yellow card) 30'; G.Tarakhchyan 90'; A.Avagyan (yellow card) 90'; Danielyan (red card) 90'	Stadium: FFA Academy Stadium; Referee: Artur Safaryan
Note: Sevan expelled from the league on 1 December 2021.

22 October 2021 10	Noah	2–2	Ararat Yerevan	Yerevan
18:00 (UTC+4)	Kireyenko 30' (yellow card) 90'; Gabarayev (yellow card) 52'; H.Nazaryan 54' (o.g.); Paireli (yellow card) 90+2'	Report	G.Malakyan (yellow card) 59'; J.Bravo (yellow card) 63'; H.Nazaryan 66'; E.Malakyan 76'; Manoyan (yellow card) 90+2'	Stadium: FFA Academy Stadium; Referee: Artem Gasparyan

27 October 2021 11	Alashkert	0–0	Noah	Yerevan
14:00 (UTC+4)	Yedigaryan (yellow card) 39'; Cametá (yellow card) 43'	Report	S.Shahinyan (yellow card) 10'; S.Gomes (yellow card) 21'; Emsis (yellow card) 39'	Stadium: Alashkert Stadium; Attendance: 200; Referee: Vardan Manukyan

31 October 2021 12	Noah	5–0	BKMA Yerevan	Yerevan
18:00 (UTC+4)	Karapetyan 4'; Paireli 22'; Avetisyan 26' (pen.); Emsis (yellow card) 32'; I.Smirnov (yellow card) 43'; Mayrovich 74'; Kireyenko (yellow card) 83' (goal) 86' (pen.)	Report	G.Petrosyan (yellow card) 42'	Stadium: FFA Academy Stadium; Attendance: 150; Referee: Zaven Hovhannisyan

5 November 2021 13	Pyunik	1–0	Noah	Yerevan
18:00 (UTC+4)	Firmino 53' (pen.); Buchnev (yellow card) 90'	Report	Monroy (yellow card) 15'; S.Shahinyan (yellow card) 29'; I.Smirnov (yellow card) 53'; Dedechko (yellow card) 77'	Stadium: Republican Stadium; Attendance: 1,000; Referee: Ashot Ghaltakchyan

19 November 2021 14	Noah	0–1	Ararat-Armenia	Yerevan
16:00 (UTC+4)	Gabarayev (yellow card) 80'	Report	Lima 69'; Terteryan (yellow card) 85'	Stadium: FFA Academy Stadium; Attendance: 500; Referee: Zaven Hovhannisyan

1 December 2021 15	Noah	2–1	Noravank	Yerevan
16:00 (UTC+4)	Gabarayev (yellow card) 9'; S.Gomes (yellow card) 26'; Kireyenko 32'; C.Ikechukwu (yellow card) 52'; Avetisyan 70' (pen.)	Report	Orlov 9' (pen.) (yellow card) 90+2'; D.Polyanskiy (yellow card) 53'	Stadium: FFA Academy Stadium; Attendance: 250; Referee: Henrik Nalbandyan

5 December 2021 16	Noah	3–0	Van	Yerevan
15:00 (UTC+4)	C.Ikechukwu 3'; Gabarayev 33'; I.Smirnov (yellow card) 45'; Monroy (yellow card) 67'; Matviyenko 77'; A.Adamyan (yellow card) 90+1'	Report	J.Gaba (yellow card) 36'; Voskanyan (yellow card) 88'; A.Petrosyan (yellow card) 90+2'	Stadium: FFA Academy Stadium; Attendance: 200; Referee: Artem Gasparyan

10 December 2021 17	Noah	1–1	Urartu	Yerevan
17:00 (UTC+4)	C.Ikechukwu (yellow card) 63'; S.Gomes (yellow card) 81'; Matviyenko 85'	Report	Désiré (yellow card) 23'; Polyakov 73'	Stadium: FFA Academy Stadium; Referee: Shahen Aghayan

19 February 2022 18	Sevan	Bye	Noah	Yerevan
(UTC+4)				Stadium: Alashkert Stadium
Note: Sevan expelled from the league on 1 December 2021.

24 February 2022 19	Ararat Yerevan	1–1	Noah	Charentsavan
14:00 (UTC+4)	E.Malakyan 70'; Mkoyan (yellow card) 83'	Report	A.Oliveira 46'; Kartashyan (yellow card) 86'; Oancea (yellow card) 90+1'	Stadium: Charentsavan City Stadium; Referee: Zaven Hovhannisyan

1 March 2022 20	Noah	0–1	Alashkert	Armavir
15:00 (UTC+4)	G.Matevosyan (yellow card) 57'; C.Ikechukwu (yellow card) 65'; Oancea (yellow card) 90+2'	Report	Gome (yellow card) 16'; Grigoryan (yellow card) 29'; Yedigaryan 66'; Cametá (yellow card) 90+1'	Stadium: Armavir City Stadium; Referee: Zaven Hovhannisyan

6 March 2022 21	BKMA Yerevan	1–1	Noah	Yerevan
14:00 (UTC+4)	Khachumyan (yellow card) 30'; A.Galstyan 49'	Report	A.Oliveira 6' (yellow card) 60'; Mayrovich (yellow card) 28'; C.Ikechukwu (yellow card) 36'; Oancea (yellow card) 70'	Stadium: FFA Academy Stadium; Referee: Shahen Aghayan

10 March 2022 22	Noah	0–1	Pyunik	Armavir
15:00 (UTC+4)	Oancea (yellow card) 63'	Report	Déblé 27'; Yurchenko (yellow card) 87'; Hovhannisyan (yellow card) 88'	Stadium: Armavir City Stadium; Referee: Artem Gasparyan

14 March 2022 23	Noah	0–3	Ararat-Armenia	Armavir
15:00 (UTC+4)	Spătaru (yellow card) 50'; Monroy (yellow card) 69'	Report	Wbeymar (yellow card) 27'; J.Duarte 42'; Lima 58'; Sanogo 75'; Udo (yellow card) 82'	Stadium: Armavir City Stadium

19 March 2022 24	Noravank	3–1	Noah	Yerevan
15:00 (UTC+4)	Ibrahim 9', 27', 53'; A.Avagyan (yellow card) 37'; Bashilov (yellow card) 45+2'; A.Kocharyan (yellow card) 90+5'	Report	Harutyunyan 3'; Spătaru (yellow card) 50' Monroy (yellow card) 90+5'	Stadium: FFA Academy Stadium; Referee: Henrik Nalbandyan

2 April 2022 2	Noah	1–0	Alashkert	Yerevan
14:00 (UTC+4)	C.Ikechukwu 90'	Report	Kadio (yellow card) 49'; Kódjo (yellow card) 79'	Stadium: Alashkert Stadium; Referee: Artem Gasparyan
Note: Match originally scheduled for 8 August, but postponed on 4 August due to Alashkert's participation in the UEFA Europa League Third qualifying round.

7 April 2022 25	Noah	0–0	Van	Armavir
15:00 (UTC+4)	Harutyunyan (yellow card) 13'; S.Shahinyan (yellow card) 28'; C.Ikechukwu (yellow card) 44'; Gabarayev (yellow card) 52'; Kartashyan (yellow card) 74'; O.Ebenezer (yellow card) 79'	Report	N.Hovhannisyan (yellow card) 15'; E.Avagyan (yellow card) 19'; E.Mireku (yellow card) 37'; Stepanov (yellow card) 90+2'	Stadium: Armavir City Stadium; Referee: Vardan Manukyan

12 April 2022 26	Urartu	2–2	Noah	Yerevan
17:00 (UTC+4)	A.Ghazaryan (yellow card) 30'; Miranyan 38' (pen.), 52'; U.Iwu (yellow card) 60'; E.Grigoryan (yellow card) 84'	Report	Mayrovich 32' (pen.); Harutyunyan (yellow card) 37'; A.Oliveira 38'; S.Shahinyan (yellow card) 50'	Stadium: Urartu Stadium; Referee: Zaven Hovhannisyan

15 April 2022 27	Noah	v	Sevan	Armavir
(UTC+4)				Stadium: Armavir City Stadium
Note: Sevan expelled from the league on 1 December 2021.

19 April 2022 28	Noah	0–0	Ararat Yerevan	Armavir
15:00 (UTC+4)		Report	Arakelyan (yellow card) 30'; Ro.Hakobyan (yellow card) 33'; G.Malakyan (yellow card) 85'	Stadium: Armavir City Stadium; Referee: Ashot Ghaltakchyan

23 April 2022 29	Alashkert	0–2	Noah	Yerevan
15:00 (UTC+4)	Cametá (yellow card) 25'; Kadio (yellow card) 90+1'	Report	Spătaru (yellow card) 38'; Mayrovich 45+2'; Oancea 77'	Stadium: Alashkert Stadium; Referee: Henrik Nalbandyan

30 April 2022 30	Noah	1–1	BKMA Yerevan	Armavir
15:00 (UTC+4)	Mayrovich 32'; V.Shahatuni (yellow card) 87'	Report	G.Petrosyan (yellow card) 82'; E.Movsesyan 88' (pen.); A.Grigoryan (yellow card) 90+4'	Stadium: Armavir City Stadium; Referee: Artem Gasparyan

5 May 2022 31	Pyunik	2–1	Noah	Yerevan
19:30 (UTC+4)	Nenadović 20'; Hovhannisyan (yellow card) 57'; Caraballo 76'	Report	Grjaznovs (yellow card) 77'; Mayrovich 84' (pen.)	Stadium: Republican Stadium; Referee: Zaven Hovhannisyan

9 May 2022 32	Ararat-Armenia	0–1	Noah	Yerevan
19:30 (UTC+4)	Udo (yellow card) 90+2'	Report	Lavrishchev 3'; S.Shahinyan (yellow card) 7'; A.Oliveira (yellow card) 50'; V.Shahatuni (yellow card) 90+4'; Matviyenko (yellow card) 90+7'	Stadium: FFA Academy Stadium; Referee: Shahen Aghayan

16 May 2022 33	Noah	3–3	Noravank	Armavir
16:00 (UTC+4)	A.Oliveira (yellow card) 26'; Mayrovich 31', 48'; Trufanov (yellow card) 64'; V.Shahatuni (yellow card) 65'; Harutyunyan 80'; Gomes (yellow card) 90'; Monroy (yellow card) 90+3'	Report	A.Khachatryan (yellow card) 8'; K.Nalbandyan 15'; Rudoselsky 22' (yellow card) 90'; Ibrahim 29'; A.Avagyan (yellow card) 54'; N.Nikoghosyan (yellow card) 65'; J.Ufuoma (yellow card) 88'	Stadium: Armavir City Stadium; Referee: Shahen Aghayan

21 May 2022 34	Van	1–0	Noah	Charentsavan
16:45 (UTC+4)	Clifford 33'	Report	Salou (yellow card) 53'	Stadium: Charentsavan City Stadium; Referee: Artem Gasparyan

25 May 2022 35	Noah	1–1	Urartu	Armavir
16:00 (UTC+4)	Mayrovich 3' (pen.) (yellow card) 88'; Gabarayev (yellow card) 43'	Report	Beglaryan (yellow card) 2'; Khlyobas 65'	Stadium: Armavir City Stadium; Referee: Zaven Hovhannisyan

28 May 2022 29	Sevan	v	Noah	Yerevan
(UTC+4)				Stadium: Alashkert Stadium
Note: Sevan expelled from the league on 1 December 2021.

==== Table ====
Pos	Team	Pld	W	D	L	GF	GA	GD	Pts	Qualification or relegation
1	Pyunik (C)	32	23	6	3	52	25	+27	75	Qualification for the Champions League first qualifying round
2	Ararat-Armenia	32	23	5	4	56	20	+36	74	Qualification for the Europa Conference League second qualifying round (Note: The 2021–22 Armenian Cup winners, Noravank, did not obtain an UEFA license and was replaced.)
3	Alashkert	32	14	9	9	38	30	+8	51	Qualification for the Europa Conference League first qualifying round
4	Ararat Yerevan	32	13	7	12	47	36	+11	46	Qualification for the Europa Conference League first qualifying round
5	Urartu	32	9	13	10	37	32	+5	40	
6	Noah	32	9	12	11	38	43	−5	39	
7	Noravank	32	7	7	18	36	55	−19	28	
8	Van	32	6	7	19	19	47	−28	25	
9	BKMA (O)	32	4	6	22	25	60	−35	18	Qualification to the relegation play-offs
10	Sevan (D, R)	0	0	0	0	0	0	0	0	Relegation to the Armenian First League (Note: Sevan was expelled from the league on 1 December 2021.)

Source: FFA Soccerway
Rules for classification: 1) Points; 2) Head-to-head points; 3) Head-to-head goal difference; 4) Head-to-head goals scored; 5) Matches won; 6) Goal difference; 7) Less red cards; 8) Less yellow cards; 9) Fair-play ranking 10) Draw
(C) Champions; (D) Disqualified; (O) Play-off winners; (R) Relegated

=== Armenian Cup ===
25 November 2021 Quarterfinal	Ararat Yerevan	1–0	Noah	Yerevan
18:00 (UTC+4)	H.Nazaryan 31'; E.Malakyan (yellow card) 41'; Díaz (yellow card) 69'; G.Malakyan (yellow card) 86'; Mkoyan (yellow card) 90+3'	Report	G.Matevosyan (yellow card) 31'; S.Gomes 85'	Stadium: Republican Stadium; Referee: Artem Gasparyan

=== UEFA Europa Conference League ===
==== Qualifying rounds ====
8 July 2021 First qualifying round 1st leg	Noah (Armenia)	1–0	(Finland) KuPS	Yerevan, Armenia
18:00 (UTC+4)	Popovitch 77' (o.g.); Jefferson (yellow card) 90+2'; Ovchinnikov (yellow card) 90+3'; Titov (yellow card) 90+4'	Report	Adjei-Boateng (yellow card) 88'	Stadium: Republican Stadium; Attendance: 3,000; Referee: Igor Stojchevski (North Macedonia)
Note: Match played at the Vazgen Sargsyan Republican Stadium in Yerevan, instead of Noah's regular Alashkert Stadium in Yerevan, which did not meet UEFA requirements.

15 July 2021 First qualifying round 2nd leg	KuPS (Finland)	5–0 (5–1 agg.)	(Armenia) Noah	Kuopio, Finland
20:00 (UTC+4)	Nissilä 13'; Uzochukwu (yellow card) 15' (goal) 39'; Tomas (yellow card) 21'; Monroy 24' (o.g.); Udo 36'; Popovitch (yellow card) 45+3'; Rangel 89'	Report	Gyasi (yellow card) 61'; Kovalenko (yellow card) 86'	Stadium: Savon Sanomat Areena; Attendance: 1,953; Referee: Novak Simović (Serbia)

== Statistics ==
As of match played 25 May 2022

=== Appearances and goals ===
No.	Pos	Nat	Player	Total		Premier League		Armenian Cup		UEFA Europa Conference League	
No.	Pos	Nat	Player	Apps	Goals	Apps	Goals	Apps	Goals	Apps	Goals
3	DF	(Armenia) ARM	Artur Kartashyan	15	0	15	0	0	0	0	0
5	DF	(Belarus) BLR	Ilya Udodov	3	0	2+1	0	0	0	0	0
6	FW	(Belarus) BLR	Hayk Musakhanyan	15	0	14+1	0	0	0	0	0
7	MF	(Armenia) ARM	Gevorg Tarakhchyan	9	0	1+8	0	0	0	0	0
8	MF	(Armenia) ARM	Sargis Shahinyan	32	0	27+2	0	1	0	0+2	0
9	FW	(Russia) RUS	Andrei Titov	4	0	2	0	0	0	0+2	0
10	FW	(Russia) RUS	Maksim Mayrovich	30	9	26+3	9	1	0	0	0
11	MF	(Russia) RUS	Yaroslav Matviyenko	9	2	1+8	2	0	0	0	0
13	DF	(Burkina Faso) BFA	Dramane Salou	11	0	7+4	0	0	0	0	0
14	DF	(Russia) RUS	Mikhail Kovalenko	3	0	1	0	0	0	2	0
17	DF	(Armenia) ARM	Jordy Monroy	34	0	30+1	0	1	0	2	0
18	DF	(Nigeria) NGR	Okezie Prince Ebenezer	7	0	1+6	0	0	0	0	0
19	MF	(Armenia) ARM	Ashot Adamyan	5	0	0+5	0	0	0	0	0
20	MF	(Portugal) POR	Alex Oliveira	31	3	18+10	3	1	0	0+2	0
21	FW	(Russia) RUS	Dmitri Lavrishchev	14	1	3+11	1	0	0	0	0
22	FW	(Armenia) ARM	Gegham Harutyunyan	21	4	13+8	4	0	0	0	0
23	MF	(Latvia) LAT	Aleksejs Grjaznovs	7	0	0+7	0	0	0	0	0
25	MF	(Nigeria) NGR	Charles Ikechukwu	19	2	8+11	2	0	0	0	0
27	DF	(Moldova) MDA	Alexei Ciopa	4	0	3+1	0	0	0	0	0
28	DF	(Russia) RUS	Grigori Trufanov	5	0	1+4	0	0	0	0	0
32	MF	(Moldova) MDA	Evgheni Oancea	15	1	15	1	0	0	0	0
65	FW	(Ghana) GHA	Raymond Gyasi	18	1	8+7	1	1	0	0+2	0
77	GK	(Armenia) ARM	Vardan Shahatuni	10	0	10	0	0	0	0	0
92	DF	(Guinea-Bissau) GBS	Saná Gomes	28	0	24+1	0	1	0	2	0
94	MF	(Moldova) MDA	Dan Spătaru	15	0	14+1	0	0	0	0	0
97	DF	(Russia) RUS	Albert Gabarayev	22	1	18+3	1	1	0	0	0
99	GK	(Russia) RUS	Grigori Matevosyan	21	0	20	0	1	0	0	0
Players away on loan:
18	MF	(Armenia) ARM	Tigran Sargsyan	4	0	0+4	0	0	0	0	0
Players who left Noah during the season:
5	DF	(Russia) RUS	Igor Smirnov	16	0	14	0	1	0	0+1	0
7	MF	(Latvia) LAT	Eduards Emsis	13	0	8+2	0	1	0	2	0
10	MF	(Armenia) ARM	Benik Hovhannisyan	11	0	5+3	0	0+1	0	2	0
12	DF	(Russia) RUS	Aleksandr Golovnya	2	0	2	0	0	0	0	0
13	FW	(Russia) RUS	Pavel Kireyenko	19	4	16	4	1	0	2	0
21	MF	(Moldova) MDA	Vadim Paireli	12	3	2+10	3	0	0	0	0
27	DF	(Brazil) BRA	Jefferson	11	0	4+5	0	0	0	2	0
69	MF	(Ukraine) UKR	Denys Dedechko	13	0	5+6	0	0	0	2	0
71	MF	(Russia) RUS	Artyom Filippov	11	0	7+4	0	0	0	0	0
87	FW	(Armenia) ARM	Aleksandr Karapetyan	14	4	10+1	4	0+1	0	2	0
88	MF	(Serbia) SRB	Dobrivoje Velemir	2	0	0+2	0	0	0	0	0
96	MF	(Armenia) ARM	Petros Avetisyan	12	2	6+3	2	0+1	0	2	0
98	GK	(Russia) RUS	Pavel Ovchinnikov	5	0	3	0	0	0	2	0

=== Goal scorers ===
Place	Position	Nation	Number	Name	Premier League	Armenian Cup	UEFA Europa Conference League	Total
1	FW	(Russia)	15	Maksim Mayrovich	9	0	0	9
2	FW	(Russia)	13	Pavel Kireyenko	4	0	0	4
2	FW	(Armenia)	87	Aleksandr Karapetyan	4	0	0	4
2	FW	(Armenia)	22	Gegham Harutyunyan	4	0	0	4
5	MF	(Moldova)	21	Vadim Paireli	3	0	0	3
5	MF	(Portugal)	20	Alex Oliveira	3	0	0	3
7	MF	(Armenia)	96	Petros Avetisyan	2	0	0	2
7	MF	(Russia)	11	Yaroslav Matviyenko	2	0	0	2
7	MF	(Nigeria)	25	Charles Ikechukwu	2	0	0	2
7				Own goal	1	0	1	2
11	FW	(Ghana)	65	Raymond Gyasi	1	0	0	1
11	DF	(Russia)	97	Albert Gabarayev	1	0	0	1
11	MF	(Moldova)	32	Evgheni Oancea	1	0	0	1
11	FW	(Russia)	21	Dmitri Lavrishchev	1	0	0	1
				TOTALS	39	0	1	40

=== Clean sheets ===
Place	Position	Nation	Number	Name	Premier League	Armenian Cup	UEFA Europa Conference League	Total
1	GK	(Armenia)	77	Vardan Shahatuni	5	0	0	5
2	GK	(Russia)	99	Grigori Matevosyan	3	0	0	3
3	GK	(Russia)	98	Pavel Ovchinnikov	0	0	1	1
				TOTALS	8	0	1	9

=== Disciplinary record ===
Number	Nation	Position	Name	Premier League		Armenian Cup		UEFA Europa Conference League		Total	
Number	Nation	Position	Name	Yellow card	Red card	Yellow card	Red card	Yellow card	Red card	Yellow card	Red card
3	(Armenia)	DF	Artur Kartashyan	2	0	0	0	0	0	2	0
8	(Armenia)	MF	Sargis Shahinyan	5	0	0	0	0	0	5	0
9	(Russia)	FW	Andrei Titov	0	0	0	0	1	0	1	0
10	(Russia)	FW	Maksim Mayrovich	2	0	0	0	0	0	2	0
11	(Russia)	MF	Yaroslav Matviyenko	1	0	0	0	0	0	1	0
13	(Burkina Faso)	DF	Dramane Salou	1	0	0	0	0	0	1	0
14	(Russia)	DF	Mikhail Kovalenko	0	1	0	0	1	0	1	1
17	(Armenia)	DF	Jordy Monroy	5	0	0	0	0	0	5	0
18	(Nigeria)	DF	Okezie Prince Ebenezer	1	0	0	0	0	0	1	0
19	(Armenia)	MF	Ashot Adamyan	1	0	0	0	0	0	1	0
20	(Portugal)	MF	Alex Oliveira	4	0	0	0	0	0	4	0
22	(Armenia)	FW	Gegham Harutyunyan	3	0	0	0	0	0	3	0
23	(Latvia)	MF	Aleksejs Grjaznovs	1	0	0	0	0	0	1	0
25	(Nigeria)	MF	Charles Ikechukwu	5	0	0	0	0	0	5	0
28	(Russia)	DF	Grigori Trufanov	1	0	0	0	0	0	1	0
32	(Moldova)	MF	Evgheni Oancea	4	0	0	0	0	0	4	0
65	(Ghana)	FW	Raymond Gyasi	0	0	0	0	1	0	1	0
77	(Armenia)	GK	Vardan Shahatuni	3	0	0	0	0	0	3	0
92	(Guinea-Bissau)	DF	Saná Gomes	7	0	1	0	0	0	8	0
94	(Moldova)	MF	Dan Spătaru	3	0	0	0	0	0	3	0
97	(Russia)	DF	Albert Gabarayev	6	0	0	0	0	0	6	0
99	(Russia)	GK	Grigori Matevosyan	3	0	1	0	0	0	4	0
Players away on loan:
Players who left Noah during the season:
5	(Russia)	DF	Igor Smirnov	4	0	0	0	0	0	4	0
7	(Latvia)	MF	Eduards Emsis	5	1	0	0	0	0	5	1
10	(Armenia)	MF	Benik Hovhannisyan	2	0	0	0	0	0	2	0
13	(Russia)	FW	Pavel Kireyenko	4	0	0	0	0	0	4	0
21	(Moldova)	MF	Vadim Paireli	1	0	0	0	0	0	1	0
27	(Brazil)	DF	Jefferson	1	0	0	0	1	0	2	0
69	(Ukraine)	MF	Denys Dedechko	3	0	0	0	0	0	3	0
88	(Serbia)	MF	Dobrivoje Velemir	1	0	0	0	0	0	1	0
98	(Russia)	GK	Pavel Ovchinnikov	0	0	0	0	1	0	1	0
			TOTALS	77	2	2	0	5	0	84	2
