= 2020–21 FC Ararat-Armenia season =

Ararat-Armenia
2020–21 season
- Director: Poghos Galstyan
- Manager: David Campaña (until 5 March); Armen Adamyan (Caretaker) (5-24 March); Anatoly Baidachny (from 24 March)
- Stadium: Republican Stadium; FFA Academy Stadium
- Premier League: 5th
- Armenian Cup: Semifinal vs Ararat Yerevan
- Armenian Supercup: Runners-up
- UEFA Champions League: First Qualifying Round vs Omonia
- UEFA Europa League: Playoff Round vs Red Star Belgrade
- Top goalscorer: League: Yusuf Otubanjo (10); All: Yusuf Otubanjo (10)
| Home colours | Away colours |

The 2020–21 season was FC Ararat-Armenia's 3rd season in Armenian Premier League, of which they were defending champions. Ararat-Armenia finished the season in 5th position, reached the semifinals of the Armenian Cup, the first qualifying round of the UEFA Champions League and the playoff round of the UEFA Europa League.

== Season events ==
After Vardan Minasyan left the club on 17 July 2020 after his contract expired, Ararat-Armenia announced the appointment of David Campaña as their new manager on 22 July.

On 23 July, Ararat-Armenia announced the signing of Alemão from Oliveirense.

On 25 July, Ararat-Armenia announced the signing of Sargis Shahinyan from Lori.

On 30 July, Ararat-Armenia announced the departure of Gor Malakyan after his contract expired.

On 5 August, Ararat-Armenia announced the signing of David Bollo, whilst Artyom Avanesyan joined Pyunik on loan for the season.

On 6 August, Van announced the arrival of Davit Nalbandyan on loan from Ararat-Armenia for the season.

On 27 August, Ararat-Armenia announced the signing of Vardan Shapperi from Lori, with fellow goalkeeper Suren Aloyan leaving Ararat-Armenia the following day after his contract was terminated by mutual consent.

On 9 September, Ararat-Armenia announced the signing of Jeisson Martínez after he'd left Fuenlabrada.

On 17 September, Armen Nahapetyan joined Pyunik on loan for the season.

On 18 September, the FFA postponed the match between Ararat Yerevan and Ararat-Armenia due to Ararat-Armenia being involved in a UEFA Europa League match on 24 September.

On 29 September, the 2020–21 Armenian Premier League season was suspended indefinitely due to the escalating 2020 Nagorno-Karabakh conflict. On the same day, Ararat-Armenia's UEFA Europa League Playoff Round match against Red Star Belgrade was moved to the GSP Stadium in Nicosia, Cyprus. On 13 October, the FFA announced that the season would resume on 17 October.

On 16 October, midfielder Kódjo left Ararat-Armenia by mutual consent.

On 29 October, Ararat-Armenia's game scheduled for 31 October against Alashkert was postponed due to 4 positive COVID-19 within the Alashkert team.

On 3 November, Ararat-Armenia's game against Gandzasar Kapan was postponed, after Gandzasar Kapan failed to turn up for the game.

On 7 December, Ararat-Armenia announced the signing of Wbeymar on a free transfer from Gandzasar Kapan.

On 29 December, Ararat-Armenia announced the signing of Dan Spătaru on a free-transfer after his FC Noah contract expired.

On 7 January, Artur Danielyan left Ararat-Armenia after his contract was terminated by mutual consent.

On 15 January, Ararat-Armenia confirmed that Ogana Louis had left the club after his contract had expired, whilst Mailson Lima left the club the following day to sign for Dibba Al-Hisn.

On 19 January, Ararat-Armenia announced the signing of Yehor Klymenchuk.

On 21 January, Ararat-Armenia confirmed that Alex Christian had left the club following the expiration of his contract.

On 22 January, Heradi Rashidi and David Terteryan signed for Ararat-Armenia, whilst Junior Bueno joined on 23 January.

On 27 January, Stefan Čupić was sold to Olympiakos Nicosia for an undisclosed fee. The following day, Hovhannes Harutyunyan was released by Ararat-Armenia.

On 3 February, Ararat-Armenia announced the signing of Nikola Petrić from Proleter Novi Sad.

On 9 February, Ararat-Armenia announced the signing of Aleksandr Karapetyan from Tambov.

On 5 March, David Campaña left his role as head coach by mutual consent, with Armen Adamyan being appointed as the caretaker head coach. On 24 March, Ararat-Armenia announced Anatoly Baidachny as their new head coach.

== Squad ==
As of match played 28 May 2021

| Number | Name | Nationality | Position | Date of birth (age) | Signed from | Signed in | Contract ends | Apps. | Goals |
Goalkeepers
| 13 | Vardan Shapperi | (Armenia) | GK | 13 March 1998 (aged 23) | Lori | 2020 | | 0 | 0 |
| 33 | Dmitry Abakumov | (Russia) | GK | 8 July 1989 (aged 31) | Luch Vladivostok | 2018 | | 79 | 0 |
| 91 | Nikola Petrić | (Serbia) | GK | 11 May 1991 (aged 30) | Proleter Novi Sad | 2020 | | 4 | 0 |
Defenders
| 2 | Alemão | (Brazil) | DF | 7 December 1992 (aged 28) | Oliveirense | 2020 | | 22 | 0 |
| 3 | Ângelo Meneses | (Portugal) | DF | 3 July 1993 (aged 27) | Famalicão | 2019 | | 53 | 2 |
| 4 | Albert Khachumyan | (Armenia) | DF | 23 June 1999 (aged 21) | Youth Team | 2017 | | 58 | 4 |
| 6 | David Bollo | (Spain) | DF | 13 November 1996 (aged 24) | Academica Clinceni | 2020 | | 20 | 2 |
| 19 | Junior Bueno | (Colombia) | DF | 3 September 1996 (aged 24) | Once Caldas | 2021 | | 13 | 1 |
| 21 | Aleksandar Damčevski | (North Macedonia) | DF | 21 November 1992 (aged 28) | Ermis Aradippou | 2018 | | 38 | 1 |
| 55 | David Terteryan | (Armenia) | DF | 17 December 1997 (aged 23) | Gandzasar Kapan | 2021 | | 16 | 1 |
Midfielders
| 5 | Sargis Shahinyan | (Armenia) | MF | 10 September 1995 (aged 25) | Lori | 2020 | | 27 | 1 |
| 7 | Heradi Rashidi | (Democratic Republic of the Congo) | MF | 24 July 1994 (aged 26) | AIK | 2021 | | 7 | 0 |
| 8 | Yoan Gouffran | (France) | MF | 25 May 1986 (aged 35) | Unattached | 2020 | | 46 | 2 |
| 10 | Armen Ambartsumyan | (Russia) | MF | 11 April 1994 (aged 27) | Fakel Voronezh | 2018 | | 87 | 3 |
| 11 | Armen Nahapetyan | (Armenia) | MF | 24 July 1999 (aged 21) | Pyunik | 2017 | | 58 | 12 |
| 16 | Wbeymar | (Armenia) | MF | 6 March 1992 (aged 29) | Gandzasar Kapan | 2020 | | 14 | 1 |
| 22 | Yehor Klymenchuk | (Ukraine) | MF | 11 November 1997 (aged 23) | Lviv | 2021 | | 4 | 0 |
| 23 | Aram Khamoyan | (Armenia) | MF | 10 January 2000 (aged 21) | Lokomotiv Yerevan | 2019 | | 0 | 0 |
| 27 | Furdjel Narsingh | (Netherlands) | MF | 13 March 1988 (aged 33) | De Graafschap | 2019 | | 59 | 4 |
| 79 | Serhiy Vakulenko | (Ukraine) | MF | 7 September 1993 (aged 27) | Karpaty Lviv | 2020 | | 36 | 6 |
| 94 | Dan Spătaru | (Moldova) | MF | 24 May 1994 (aged 27) | Noah | 2020 | | 11 | 0 |
Forwards
| 9 | Jeisson Martínez | (Peru) | FW | 28 December 1994 (aged 26) | Fuenlabrada | 2020 | | 18 | 3 |
| 17 | Zakaria Sanogo | (Burkina Faso) | FW | 11 December 1996 (aged 24) | Rahimo | 2019 | | 68 | 5 |
| 24 | Yusuf Otubanjo | (Nigeria) | FW | 12 September 1992 (aged 28) | LASK | 2020 | | 46 | 19 |
| 77 | Artur Serobyan | (Armenia) | FW | 2 July 2003 (aged 17) | Youth Team | 2020 | | 16 | 0 |
| 87 | Aleksandr Karapetyan | (Armenia) | FW | 23 December 1987 (aged 33) | Tambov | 2021 | | 16 | 4 |
| 99 | Armen Hovhannisyan | (Armenia) | FW | 7 March 2000 (aged 21) | Nitra | 2020 | | 31 | 15 |
Away on loan
| 18 | Artyom Avanesyan | (Russia) | FW | 17 July 1999 (aged 21) | Ararat Moscow | 2018 | | 21 | 5 |
| 25 | Davit Nalbandyan | (Armenia) | MF | 9 August 1999 (aged 21) | Youth Team | 2017 | | 26 | 0 |
| | Narek Alaverdyan | (Armenia) | MF | 19 February 2002 (aged 19) | Youth Team | 2019 | | 2 | 0 |
| | Zhirayr Shaghoyan | (Armenia) | MF | 10 April 2001 (aged 20) | Youth Team | 2017 | | 34 | 8 |
Left during the season
| 1 | Suren Aloyan | (Armenia) | GK | 10 August 1997 (aged 23) | Youth Team | 2019 | | 0 | 0 |
| 11 | Hovhannes Harutyunyan | (Armenia) | MF | 25 May 1999 (aged 22) | Zemplín Michalovce | 2019 | | 30 | 6 |
| 22 | Artur Danielyan | (Armenia) | DF | 9 February 1998 (aged 23) | Stal Kamianske | 2019 | | 40 | 2 |
| 25 | Stefan Čupić | (Serbia) | GK | 7 May 1994 (aged 27) | Voždovac | 2019 | | 28 | 0 |
| 63 | Kódjo | (Ivory Coast) | MF | 28 May 1993 (aged 28) | Feirense | 2019 | | 55 | 3 |
| 67 | Ilja Antonov | (Estonia) | MF | 5 December 1992 (aged 28) | Hermannstadt | 2019 | | 29 | 1 |
| 93 | Alex Christian | (Haiti) | DF | 5 December 1993 (aged 27) | Gandzasar Kapan | 2019 | | 45 | 0 |
| 94 | Mailson Lima | (Cape Verde) | MF | 29 May 1994 (aged 26) | Viitorul Constanța | 2019 | | 69 | 20 |
| 99 | Ogana Louis | (Nigeria) | FW | 29 December 1995 (aged 25) | Žalgiris | 2019 | | 55 | 19 |

=== Out on loan ===
Note: Flags indicate national team as defined under FIFA eligibility rules; some limited exceptions apply. Players may hold more than one non-FIFA nationality.

| No. | Pos. | Nation | Player |
|---|---|---|---|
| 18 | FW | RUS | Artyom Avanesyan (at Pyunik) |
| 25 | MF | ARM | Davit Nalbandyan (at Van) |

| No. | Pos. | Nation | Player |
|---|---|---|---|
| — | MF | ARM | Zhirayr Shaghoyan (at BKMA Yerevan) |

== Transfers ==
=== In ===
| Date | Position | Nationality | Name | From | Fee | Ref. |
|---|---|---|---|---|---|---|
| 23 July 2020 | DF | (Brazil) | Alemão | Oliveirense | Undisclosed | |
| 25 July 2020 | MF | (Armenia) | Sargis Shahinyan | Lori | Undisclosed | |
| 5 August 2020 | MF | (Spain) | David Bollo | Academica Clinceni | Undisclosed | |
| 27 August 2020 | GK | (Armenia) | Vardan Shapperi | Lori | Undisclosed | |
| 9 September 2020 | FW | (Peru) | Jeisson Martínez | Fuenlabrada | Free | |
| 7 December 2020 | MF | (Armenia) | Wbeymar | Gandzasar Kapan | Free | |
| 29 December 2020 | MF | (Moldova) | Dan Spătaru | Noah | Free | |
| 19 January 2021 | DF | (Ukraine) | Yehor Klymenchuk | Lviv | Undisclosed | |
| 22 January 2021 | MF | (Democratic Republic of the Congo) | Heradi Rashidi | AIK | Undisclosed | |
| 22 January 2021 | DF | (Armenia) | David Terteryan | Gandzasar Kapan | Free | |
| 23 January 2021 | DF | (Colombia) | Junior Bueno | Once Caldas | Undisclosed | |
| 3 February 2021 | GK | (Serbia) | Nikola Petrić | Proleter Novi Sad | Undisclosed | |
| 9 February 2021 | FW | (Armenia) | Aleksandr Karapetyan | Tambov | Undisclosed | |

=== Out ===
| Date | Position | Nationality | Name | To | Fee | Ref. |
|---|---|---|---|---|---|---|
| 1 August 2020 | MF | (Armenia) | Arman Khachatryan | Van | Undisclosed | |
| 16 January 2021 | MF | (Cape Verde) | Mailson Lima | Dibba Al-Hisn | Undisclosed | |
| 27 January 2021 | GK | (Serbia) | Stefan Čupić | Olympiakos Nicosia | Undisclosed | |

=== Loans out ===
| Date from | Position | Nationality | Name | To | Date to | Ref. |
|---|---|---|---|---|---|---|
| Summer 2019 | MF | (Armenia) | Zhirayr Shaghoyan | BKMA Yerevan | End of 2020/21 Season | |
| 5 August 2020 | FW | (Russia) | Artyom Avanesyan | Pyunik | End of season | |
| 6 August 2020 | MF | (Armenia) | Davit Nalbandyan | Van | End of season | |
| 26 July 2020 | MF | (Armenia) | Narek Alaverdyan | BKMA Yerevan | Undisclosed | |
| 17 September 2020 | MF | (Armenia) | Armen Nahapetyan | Pyunik | 31 December 2020 | |

=== Released ===
| Date | Position | Nationality | Name | Joined | Date | Ref. |
|---|---|---|---|---|---|---|
| 30 July 2020 | MF | (Armenia) | Gor Malakyan | Pyunik | 3 August 2020 | |
| 28 August 2020 | GK | (Armenia) | Suren Aloyan | Sevan | 30 August 2020 | |
| 16 October 2020 | MF | (Ivory Coast) | Kódjo | Taraz | 14 February 2021 | |
| 31 December 2020 | MF | (Estonia) | Ilja Antonov | Levadia | 4 February 2021 | |
| 7 January 2021 | DF | (Armenia) | Artur Danielyan | Ararat Yerevan | 7 January 2021 | |
| 15 January 2021 | FW | (Nigeria) | Ogana Louis | Sreenidi Deccan | 2 February 2022 | |
| 21 January 2021 | DF | (Haiti) | Alex Christian | Atyrau | 3 February 2021 | |
| 27 January 2021 | MF | (Armenia) | Hovhannes Harutyunyan | Pyunik | 4 February 2021 | |

=== Trial ===
| Date from | Position | Nationality | Name | Previous club | Date to | Ref. |
|---|---|---|---|---|---|---|
| January 2021 | FW | (Armenia) | Aleksandr Karapetyan | Tambov | 9 February 2021 | |

== Friendlies ==
| 30 August 2020 | Urartu | 1 – 1 | Ararat-Armenia | Yerevan |
| 17:30 (UTC+4) | Polyakov 16' (pen.) | Report | Louis 58' (pen.) | Stadium: Urartu Training Centre |

| 11 October 2020 | Ararat-Armenia | 1 – 1 | Urartu | Yerevan |
| 14:00 (UTC+4) | Otubanjo | Report | Polyakov | Stadium: FFA Academy Stadium |

| 23 January 2021 | Ararat-Armenia | 3 – 1 | Sevan | Yerevan |
| 12:30 (UTC+4) | Spătaru; Otubanjo | Report | Goal | Stadium: FFA Academy Stadium |

| 30 January 2021 | Ararat-Armenia | 0 – 2 | (Russia) Ural Yekaterinburg | United Arab Emirates |
| 17:00 (UTC+4) | | Report | Bicfalvi 44'; Magomadov 49' (pen.) |

| 3 February 2021 | Ararat-Armenia | 1 – 1 | (Russia) Rodina Moscow | United Arab Emirates |
| 11:00 (UTC+4) | Martínez 11' | Report | A.Khametov 84' |

| 4 February 2021 | Ararat-Armenia | 0 – 4 | (Russia) Zenit St.Petersburg | Dubai, United Arab Emirates |
| 14:00 (UTC+4) | | Report | Sutormin 30' (pen.) (yellow card) 85'; Malcom 67', 71'; Wendel 81' | Stadium: Nad Al Sheba Stadium; Referee: Dusan Dimitrievich (Serbia) |

| 11 February 2021 | Ararat-Armenia | 0 – 5 | (Latvia) Riga | United Arab Emirates |
| 16:00 (UTC+4) | | Report | Vakulenko 6' (o.g.); Soisalo 7', 17'; Milošević 36'; Fjodorovs 86' |

| 27 March 2021 | Urartu | 1 – 1 | Ararat-Armenia | Yerevan |
| (UTC+4) | K.Melkonyan 67' | Report | Hovhannisyan 57' | Stadium: Urartu Training Centre |

== Competitions ==
=== Overall record ===
| Competition | First match | Last match | Starting round | Final position | Record | | | | | | | |
| Competition | First match | Last match | Starting round | Final position | Pld | W | D | L | GF | GA | GD | Win % |
|---|---|---|---|---|---|---|---|---|---|---|---|---|
| Premier League | 14 August 2020 | 28 May 2021 | Matchday 1 | 5th | 24 | 10 | 8 | 6 | 32 | 17 | +15 | 41.67 |
| Armenian Cup | 12 March 2021 | 1 May 2021 | Quarterfinal | Semifinal | 4 | 2 | 0 | 2 | 3 | 4 | −1 | 50.00 |
| Armenian Supercup | 9 August 2020 | | Final | Runners-up | 1 | 0 | 0 | 1 | 1 | 2 | −1 | 0.00 |
| UEFA Champions League | 19 August 2020 | | First qualifying round | First qualifying round | 1 | 0 | 0 | 1 | 0 | 1 | −1 | 0.00 |
| UEFA Europa League | 17 September 2020 | 1 October 2020 | Second qualifying round | Playoff Round | 3 | 2 | 0 | 1 | 6 | 5 | +1 | 66.67 |
| Total | | | | | 33 | 14 | 8 | 11 | 42 | 29 | +13 | 42.42 |

Last updated: 28 May 2021
Source: Competitions

=== Supercup ===
| 9 August 2020 | Noah | 2 – 1 (a.e.t.) | Ararat-Armenia | Yerevan |
| 19:00 (UTC+4) | Kovalenko (yellow card) 14'; Emsis (yellow card) 22'; Dedechko (yellow card) 57' (goal) 99' (pen.); Lavrishchev 90'; H.Manga (yellow card) 91'; V.Vimercati (yellow card) 108'; Gareginyan (yellow card) 114' | Report | Mailson 60'; Bollo (red card) 115'; Gouffran (yellow card) 120' | Stadium: FFA Academy Stadium; Attendance: 0 Referee: Ashot Ghaltakchyan |

=== Premier League ===
==== Results summary ====
| Overall | | | | | | | | Home | | | | | | Away | | | | | |
| Pld | W | D | L | GF | GA | GD | Pts | W | D | L | GF | GA | GD | W | D | L | GF | GA | GD |
|---|---|---|---|---|---|---|---|---|---|---|---|---|---|---|---|---|---|---|---|
| 24 | 10 | 8 | 6 | 32 | 17 | +15 | 38 | 5 | 3 | 4 | 22 | 12 | +10 | 5 | 5 | 2 | 10 | 5 | +5 |

Last updated: 28 May 2021.
Source: See Results

==== Results by round ====
| Round | 1 | 2 | 3 | 4 | 5 | 6 | 7 | 8 | 9 | 10 | 11 | 12 | 13 | 14 | 15 | 16 | 17 | 18 | 19 | 20 | 21 | 22 | 23 | 24 | 25 | 26 |
|---|---|---|---|---|---|---|---|---|---|---|---|---|---|---|---|---|---|---|---|---|---|---|---|---|---|---|
| Ground | A | - | H | H | A | - | A | H | A | H | A | H | A | H | A | H | H | A | H | A | H | A | A | H | H | A |
| Result | D | - | L | W | W | - | D | W | W | D | W | W | L | L | D | W | L | W | W | D | D | D | W | D | L | L |
| Position | 7 | - | 7 | 7 | 7 | - | 7 | 5 | 2 | 2 | 1 | 1 | 2 | 3 | 4 | 3 | 3 | 3 | 3 | 3 | 4 | 4 | 2 | 2 | 4 | 5 |

Updated to match(es) played on 28 May 2021. Source: See Results
A = Away; H = Home; W = Win; D = Draw; L = Loss

==== Results ====
| 14 August 2020 1 | Alashkert | 0 – 0 | Ararat-Armenia | Yerevan |
| 17:30 (UTC+4) | Glišić (yellow card) 47'; Bryan (yellow card) 90' | Report | S.Shahinyan (yellow card) 15' (yellow-red card) 61'; A.Khachumyan (yellow card) 90' | Stadium: Alashkert Stadium; Attendance: 0 Referee: Henrik Nalbandyan |
Note: Match played behind closed doors due to the COVID-19 pandemic.

| 23 August 2020 2 | Ararat-Armenia | 1 – 1 | Gandzasar Kapan | Yerevan |
| 18:30 (UTC+4) | Vakulenko (yellow card) 62' (goal) 63'; Kódjo (yellow card) 70' | Report | G.Harutyunyan 45+1' (yellow card) 87'; Wbeymar (yellow card) 67'; Coelho (yellow card) 80' | Stadium: FFA Academy Stadium; Attendance: 0 Referee: Artur Safaryan |
Note: Match played behind closed doors due to the COVID-19 pandemic. Match annulled after Gandzasar Kapan dropped out of the league.

| 11 September 2020 4 | Ararat-Armenia | 1 – 2 | Lori | Yerevan |
| 19:15 (UTC+4) | Mailson (yellow card) 54'; Sanogo (yellow card) 57'; Otubanjo 90+5' (pen.) | Report | Abudi (yellow card) 15' (goal) 62'; Rudoselskiy 41' (yellow card) 45'; Fernandinho (yellow card) 65'; Stepanov (yellow card) 72'; Ohayon (red card) 90+3' | Stadium: FFA Academy Stadium; Attendance: 0 Referee: Shahen Aghayan |
Note: Match played behind closed doors due to the COVID-19 pandemic.

| 17 October 2020 8 | Ararat-Armenia | 7 – 0 | Shirak | Yerevan |
| 16:00 (UTC+4) | Otubanjo 7', 55'; Bollo 15'; Mailson 21', 48'; Louis 37', 81'; Vakulenko (yellow card) 50' | Report | A.Gevorkyan (yellow card) 14' | Stadium: FFA Academy Stadium; Attendance: 0 Referee: Henrik Nalbandyan |
Note: Match played behind closed doors due to the COVID-19 pandemic.

| 25 October 2020 9 | Van | 0 – 1 | Ararat-Armenia | Charentsavan |
| 16:00 (UTC+4) | Eza (yellow card) 80' | Report | Mailson 55'; Abakumov (yellow card) 90+4' | Stadium: Charentsavan City Stadium; Attendance: 0 Referee: Zaven Hovhannisyan |
Note: Match played behind closed doors due to the COVID-19 pandemic.

| 31 October 2020 11 | Gandzasar Kapan | v | Ararat-Armenia | Yerevan |
| (UTC+4) | | | | Stadium: FFA Academy Stadium |
Note: Match postponed on 3 November after Gandzasar Kapan did not turn up.

| 8 November 2020 3 | Noah | 0 – 0 | Ararat-Armenia | Yerevan |
| 15:30 (UTC+4) | H.Manga (yellow card) 59'; Kryuchkov (yellow card) 90+1' | Report | Danielyan (yellow card) 36'; Louis (yellow card) 54' | Stadium: FFA Academy Stadium; Attendance: 0 Referee: Zaven Hovhannisyan |
Note: Match played behind closed doors due to the COVID-19 pandemic.

| 23 November 2020 12 | Ararat-Armenia | 3 – 1 | Noah | Yerevan |
| 17:00 (UTC+4) | Bollo 8' (yellow card) 41'; Martínez 38' (yellow card) 88'; Ângelo (yellow card) 55'; S.Shahinyan 70'; Gouffran (yellow card) 74'; Mailson (yellow card) 90+4' | Report | A.Oliveira 35'; S.Gomes (yellow card) 46'; Simonyan (yellow card) 61'; Spătaru (yellow card) 75' | Stadium: FFA Academy Stadium; Attendance: 0 Referee: Henrik Nalbandyan |
Note: Match played behind closed doors due to the COVID-19 pandemic.

| 28 November 2020 13 | Lori | 0 – 1 | Ararat-Armenia | Vanadzor |
| 14:30 (UTC+4) | Stepanov (yellow card) 1'; Abudi (yellow card) 30'; Alexis (yellow card) 59' | Report | Alemão (yellow card) 26'; Martínez 56'; Bollo (yellow card) 85' | Stadium: Vanadzor Football Academy; Attendance: 0 Referee: Artur Safaryan |
Note: Match played behind closed doors due to the COVID-19 pandemic.

| 2 December 2020 14 | Ararat-Armenia | 0 – 0 | Ararat Yerevan | Yerevan |
| 14:30 (UTC+4) | Alemão (yellow card) 86' | Report | J.Bravo (yellow card) 10'; K.Muradyan (yellow card) 21' | Stadium: FFA Academy Stadium; Attendance: 0 Referee: Shahen Aghayan |
Note: Match played behind closed doors due to the COVID-19 pandemic.

| 6 December 2020 15 | Pyunik | 0 – 1 | Ararat-Armenia | Yerevan |
| 14:30 (UTC+4) | Kartashyan (yellow card) 26' | Report | Mailson 25' (pen.); Ângelo (yellow card) 82' | Stadium: Republican Stadium; Attendance: 0 Referee: Ashot Ghaltakchyan |
Note: Match played behind closed doors due to the COVID-19 pandemic.

| 21 February 2021 6 | Ararat-Armenia | 2 – 1 | Pyunik | Yerevan |
| 14:45 (UTC+4) | Terteryan (yellow card) 21'; Karapetyan 45'; Wbeymar 51'; Rashidi (yellow card) 77' | Report | Tatarkov 8' | Stadium: Urartu-3 Stadium; Attendance: 0 Referee: Artem Gasparyan |
Note: Match played behind closed doors due to the COVID-19 pandemic.

| 25 February 2021 5 | Ararat Yerevan | 1 – 0 | Ararat-Armenia | Charentsavan |
| 15:00 (UTC+4) | J.Bravo (yellow card) 45'; D.Pobulić 72' | Report | Sanogo (yellow card) 17' | Stadium: Charentsavan City Stadium; Attendance: 0 Referee: Zaven Hovhannisyan |
Note: Match originally scheduled for 22 September but postponed on 18 September. Match played behind closed doors due to the COVID-19 pandemic.

| 2 March 2021 16 | Ararat-Armenia | 0 – 1 | Urartu | Yerevan |
| 14:00 (UTC+4) | Terteryan (yellow card) 43'; Serobyan (yellow card) 73' | Report | Paderin 49'; James (yellow card) 62'; K.Melkonyan (yellow card) 85' | Stadium: FFA Academy Stadium; Attendance: 0 Referee: Artem Gasparyan |
Note: Match played behind closed doors due to the COVID-19 pandemic.

| 7 March 2021 17 | Shirak | 1 – 1 | Ararat-Armenia | Gyumri |
| 14:00 (UTC+4) | E.Vardanyan (yellow card) 17'; Y.Silue (yellow card) 23' (yellow-red card) 71' (goal) 55'; V.Arzoyan (yellow card) 60'; Meneses 81' (o.g.) | Report | Sanogo 52'; Vakulenko (yellow card) 66'; Otubanjo 79' (pen.); Gouffran (yellow card) 85' | Stadium: Gyumri Football Academy; Attendance: 100; Referee: Gevorg Eghoyan |

| 18 March 2021 18 | Ararat-Armenia | 3 – 0 | Van | Yerevan |
| 16:00 (UTC+4) | Tenyayev 12' (o.g.); Otubanjo 24', 83'; Sanogo (red card) 61'; Bueno (yellow card) 77' | Report | Va.Ayvazyan (yellow card) 42' | Stadium: FFA Academy Stadium; Attendance: 100; Referee: Henrik Nalbandyan |

| 8 April 2021 19 | Ararat-Armenia | 2 – 3 | Van | Yerevan |
| 15:00 (UTC+4) | Karapetyan 34'; Wbeymar (yellow card) 17'; Otubanjo 90+4' | Report | S.Adjouman 4' (yellow card) 47'; Tenyayev 50'; D.Dosa (yellow card) 78'; E.Movsesyan 88' | Stadium: FFA Academy Stadium; Attendance: 150; Referee: Henrik Nalbandyan |

| 13 April 2021 26 | Lori | 0 – 3 | Ararat-Armenia | Vanadzor |
| (UTC+4) | | | | Stadium: Vanadzor Football Academy |
Note: Match originally scheduled for 28 November 2020. Match awarded 3-0 to Ararat-Armenia.

| 15 April 2021 20 | Ararat-Armenia | 2 – 1 | Shirak | Yerevan |
| 15:00 (UTC+4) | Otubanjo 10'; Karapetyan 16'; Ambartsumyan (yellow card) 31'; Spătaru (yellow card) 90+3' | Report | R.Mkrtchyan (yellow card) 36'; A.Sadoyan (yellow card) 64'; Stanojević 71' (pen.); A.Muradyan (yellow card) 80'; T.Diomandé (yellow card) 90+5' | Stadium: FFA Academy Stadium; Attendance: 100; Referee: Vardan Manukyan |

| 25 April 2021 21 | Urartu | 0 – 0 | Ararat-Armenia | Yerevan |
| 19:00 (UTC+4) | Ten (yellow card) 89' | Report | Bueno (yellow card) 43'; Serobyan (yellow card) 90+4' | Stadium: Urartu Stadium; Attendance: 1,500; Referee: Ashot Ghaltakchyan |

| 6 May 2021 22 | Ararat-Armenia | 0 – 0 | Noah | Yerevan |
| 19:00 (UTC+4) | Ambartsumyan (yellow card) 38'; Terteryan (red card) 49'; Wbeymar (yellow card) 77'; Bueno (yellow card) 86' | Report | Monroy (yellow card) 61'; Avetisyan (yellow card) 86' | Stadium: FFA Academy Stadium; Attendance: 800; Referee: Zaven Hovhannisyan |

| 11 May 2021 23 | Pyunik | 0 – 0 | Ararat-Armenia | Yerevan |
| 19:30 (UTC+4) | Tatarkov (yellow card) 46'; Kozhushko (yellow card) 82'; Hovhannisyan (yellow card) 87' | Report | Bueno (yellow card) 51'; Alemão (yellow card) 72'; A.Khachumyan (yellow card) 78'; Gouffran (yellow card) 82' | Stadium: Republican Stadium; Attendance: 500; Referee: Artem Gasparyan |

| 15 May 2021 7 | Urartu | 1 – 2 | Ararat-Armenia | Yerevan |
| 15:00 (UTC+4) | Polyakov 36' | Report | Otubanjo 16', 82' (yellow card) 65'; Wbeymar (yellow card) 39' | Stadium: Urartu Stadium; Attendance: 500; Referee: Henrik Nalbandyan |

| 19 May 2021 24 | Ararat-Armenia | 1 – 1 | Ararat Yerevan | Yerevan |
| 15:30 (UTC+4) | Sanogo (yellow card) 8'; A.Nahapetyan (yellow card) 73'; Karapetyan 74' | Report | Nenadović (yellow card) 13'; Zaderaka 42' (yellow card) 54' | Stadium: FFA Academy Stadium; Attendance: 1,000; Referee: Zaven Hovhannisyan |

| 22 May 2021 10 | Ararat-Armenia | 1 – 2 | Alashkert | Yerevan |
| 16:45 (UTC+4) | Bueno 46'; A.Khachumyan (yellow card) 49'; Wbeymar (yellow card) 52'; Klymenchuk (yellow card) 83'; Ambartsumyan (yellow card) 88' | Report | Gome 14' (yellow card) 90+4'; Glišić (yellow card) 31'; Voskanyan 90+2'; Grigoryan (yellow card) 90+2' | Stadium: FFA Academy Stadium; Attendance: 500; Referee: Henrik Nalbandyan |
Note: Match originally scheduled for 31 October, but was postponed on 29 October due to the COVID-19 pandemic.

| 28 May 2021 25 | Alashkert | 1 – 0 | Ararat-Armenia | Yerevan |
| 17:30 (UTC+4) | Hovsepyan (yellow card) 53'; Boljević 67' | Report | Wbeymar (yellow card) 50'; Bueno (red card) 87' | Stadium: Alashkert Stadium; Referee: Henrik Nalbandyan |

==== Table ====
| Pos | Team | Pld | W | D | L | GF | GA | GD | Pts | Qualification or relegation |
|---|---|---|---|---|---|---|---|---|---|---|
| 1 | Alashkert (C) | 24 | 13 | 7 | 4 | 25 | 15 | +10 | 46 | Qualification for the Champions League first qualifying round |
| 2 | Noah | 24 | 12 | 5 | 7 | 35 | 20 | +15 | 41 | Qualification for the Europa Conference League first qualifying round |
| 3 | Urartu | 24 | 12 | 5 | 7 | 28 | 19 | +9 | 41 | Qualification for the Europa Conference League first qualifying round |
| 4 | Ararat (Note: Ararat qualified for Europa Conference League first qualifying round as winners of 2020–21 Armenian Cup.) | 24 | 11 | 7 | 6 | 34 | 18 | +16 | 40 | Qualification for the Europa Conference League first qualifying round |
| 5 | Ararat-Armenia | 24 | 10 | 8 | 6 | 32 | 17 | +15 | 38 | |
| 6 | Van | 24 | 9 | 4 | 11 | 25 | 30 | −5 | 31 | |
| 7 | Pyunik | 24 | 6 | 7 | 11 | 20 | 18 | +2 | 25 | |
| 8 | Lori (Note: Round 19–27 matches involving Lori were all declared 3–0 forfeits in favor of the remaining 8 teams.) | 24 | 7 | 2 | 15 | 16 | 44 | −28 | 23 | |
| 9 | Shirak (R) | 24 | 2 | 7 | 15 | 19 | 53 | −34 | 13 | Relegation to First League |
| 10 | Gandzasar (R, D) | 0 | 0 | 0 | 0 | 0 | 0 | 0 | 0 | Club disqualified (Note: Gandzasar were excluded from the league On 3 November, Gandzasar Kapan announced that they were withdrawing from the League and Armenian Cup due to the ongoing financial constraints relating to the ongoing COVID-19 pandemic in Armenia and the 2020 Nagorno-Karabakh conflict.) |

Source: FFA Soccerway
Rules for classification: 1) Points; 2) Play-off (only if deciding champion); 3) Matches won; 4) Head-to-head points; 5) Head-to-head matches won; 6) Head-to-head goal difference; 7) Head-to-head goals scored; 8) Head-to-head away goals scored; 9) Goal difference; 10) Goals scored.
(C) Champions; (D) Disqualified; (R) Relegated

=== Armenian Cup ===
| 12 March 2021 Quarterfinal 1st leg | Van | 0–1 | Ararat-Armenia | Charentsavan |
| 14:00 (UTC+4) | Deou Dosa (yellow card) 45'; Aleksey Shishkin (yellow card) 71'; Argishti Petrosyan (yellow card) 90' | Report | Khachumyan (yellow card) 29'; Sanogo 74' | Stadium: Charentsavan City Stadium; Referee: Zaven Hovhannisyan |

| 4 April 2021 Quarterfinal 2nd leg | Ararat-Armenia | 0–1 (a.e.t.) (1–1 agg.) (5 – 4 p) | Van | Yerevan |
| 15:00 (UTC+4) | Vakulenko (yellow card) 70' | Report | D.Dosa (yellow card) 67'; E.Movsesyan 90'; E.Mireku (yellow card) 116' | Stadium: FFA Academy Stadium; Referee: Ashot Ghaltakchyan |
| | Penalties |
| | Alemão (penalty scored); Wbeymar (penalty scored); Ambartsumyan (penalty scored); Vakulenko (penalty scored); Karapetyan (penalty scored) | | (penalty scored) Voskanyan; (penalty scored) Vi.Ayvazyan; (penalty scored) Tenyayev; (penalty missed) G.Kirakosyan |

| 20 April 2021 Semifinal 1st leg | Ararat Yerevan | 2 – 0 | Ararat-Armenia | Yerevan |
| 18:30 (UTC+4) | Nenadović 18'; Prljević 48'; Malakyan (yellow card) 55'; D.Pobulić (yellow card) 89' | Report | Wbeymar (yellow card) 36'; Otubanjo (yellow card) 53' | Stadium: Republican Stadium; Attendance: 400; Referee: Artem Gasparyan |

| 1 May 2021 Semifinal 2nd leg | Ararat-Armenia | 2 – 1 (2 – 3 agg.) | Ararat Yerevan | Yerevan |
| 15:00 (UTC+4) | Gouffran 23'; Otubanjo (yellow card) 45'; Terteryan 78' (yellow card) 90' | Report | Z.Margaryan (yellow card) 56'; Nenadović 72'; Mkoyan (yellow card) 77' | Stadium: FFA Academy Stadium; Attendance: 400; Referee: Zaven Hovhannisyan |

=== UEFA Champions League ===
==== Qualifying rounds ====
| 19 August 2020 First Qualifying Round | Ararat-Armenia | 0 – 1 (a.e.t.) | (Cyprus) Omonia | Yerevan, Armenia |
| 19:00 (UTC+4) | Vakulenko (yellow card) 17'; Kódjo (yellow card) 62'; Bollo (yellow card) 73' (yellow-red card) 97'; Ângelo (yellow card) 74' | Report | Ďuriš (yellow card) 39'; Thiago (yellow card) 74' (goal) 94'; Tzionis (yellow card) 102'; Lecjaks (yellow card) 116' | Stadium: FFA Academy Stadium; Attendance: 0 Referee: Viktor Shimusik (Belarus) |
Note: Match played behind closed doors.

=== UEFA Europa League ===
==== Qualifying rounds ====
| 17 September 2020 Second Qualifying Round | Ararat-Armenia | 4 – 3 (a.e.t.) | (Luxembourg) Fola Esch | Yerevan, Armenia |
| 18:00 (UTC+4) | Martínez 16'; Christian (yellow card) 39' (yellow-red card) 43'; Alemão (yellow card) 55'; Mailson 90+1' (pen.), 90+4' (pen.); Ambartsumyan (yellow card) 100'; Sanogo (yellow card) 103'; Vakulenko 113' | Report | Pimentel 19' (yellow card) 68' (yellow-red card) 90+1'; G.Delgado (yellow card) 23'; Bensi 56'; Bensi (yellow card) 72'; Hadji 81'; Sacras (yellow card) 90+3'; J.Klein (yellow card) 117' | Stadium: Republican Stadium; Attendance: 0 Referee: Enea Jorgji (Albania) |
Note: Match played at the Republican Stadium in Yerevan, instead of Ararat-Armenia's regular FFA Academy Stadium in Yerevan. Match played behind closed doors due to the COVID-19 pandemic.

| 24 September 2020 Third Qualifying Round | Ararat-Armenia | 1 – 0 (a.e.t.) | (Slovenia) Celje | Yerevan, Armenia |
| 18:00 (UTC+4) | Vakulenko (yellow card) 58' (goal) 111'; Gouffran (yellow card) 76' | Report | Božić (yellow card) 5'; Vrbanec (yellow card) 20'; Kerin (yellow card) 24'; Dangubić (yellow card) 79'; Stojinović (yellow card) 95' | Stadium: Republican Stadium; Attendance: 0 Referee: John Beaton (Scotland) |
Note: Match played at the Republican Stadium in Yerevan, instead of Ararat-Armenia's regular FFA Academy Stadium in Yerevan. Match played behind closed doors due to the COVID-19 pandemic.

| 1 October 2020 Playoff Round | Ararat-Armenia | 1 – 2 | (Serbia) Red Star Belgrade | Nicosia, Cyprus |
| 21:00 (UTC+4) | Mailson 72'; Sanogo (yellow card) 90+5' | Report | Rodić (yellow card) 29'; Katai 45'; Falcinelli (yellow card) 45+2' (goal) 60'; Ivanić (yellow card) 55' | Stadium: GSP Stadium; Attendance: 0 Referee: Anastasios Sidiropoulos (Greece) |
Note: Match played at the GSP Stadium in Nicosia, Cyprus instead of Ararat-Armenia's regular FFA Academy Stadium in Yerevan due to the 2020 Nagorno-Karabakh conflict. Match played behind closed doors due to the COVID-19 pandemic.

== Statistics ==
As of match played 28 May 2021

=== Appearances and goals ===
| No. | Pos | Nat | Player | Total | | Premier League | | Armenian Cup | | Armenian Supercup | | Champions League | | Europa League | |
| No. | Pos | Nat | Player | Apps | Goals | Apps | Goals | Apps | Goals | Apps | Goals | Apps | Goals | Apps | Goals |
|---|---|---|---|---|---|---|---|---|---|---|---|---|---|---|---|
| 2 | DF | (Brazil) BRA | Alemão | 22 | 0 | 9+5 | 0 | 1+2 | 0 | 1 | 0 | 1 | 0 | 3 | 0 |
| 3 | DF | (Portugal) POR | Ângelo Meneses | 17 | 0 | 10+2 | 0 | 0 | 0 | 0+1 | 0 | 1 | 0 | 3 | 0 |
| 4 | DF | (Armenia) ARM | Albert Khachumyan | 17 | 0 | 10+4 | 0 | 3 | 0 | 0 | 0 | 0 | 0 | 0 | 0 |
| 5 | MF | (Armenia) ARM | Sargis Shahinyan | 27 | 1 | 9+11 | 1 | 2 | 0 | 1 | 0 | 0+1 | 0 | 2+1 | 0 |
| 6 | DF | (Spain) ESP | David Bollo | 20 | 2 | 14+1 | 2 | 0+1 | 0 | 1 | 0 | 1 | 0 | 2 | 0 |
| 7 | MF | (Democratic Republic of the Congo) COD | Heradi Rashidi | 7 | 0 | 1+5 | 0 | 1 | 0 | 0 | 0 | 0 | 0 | 0 | 0 |
| 8 | MF | (France) FRA | Yoan Gouffran | 31 | 1 | 20+3 | 0 | 2+1 | 1 | 0+1 | 0 | 1 | 0 | 3 | 0 |
| 9 | FW | (Peru) PER | Jeisson Martínez | 18 | 3 | 6+7 | 2 | 2 | 0 | 0 | 0 | 0 | 0 | 3 | 1 |
| 10 | MF | (Russia) RUS | Armen Ambartsumyan | 31 | 0 | 18+4 | 0 | 4 | 0 | 0+1 | 0 | 0+1 | 0 | 0+3 | 0 |
| 11 | MF | (Armenia) ARM | Armen Nahapetyan | 3 | 0 | 0+2 | 0 | 0+1 | 0 | 0 | 0 | 0 | 0 | 0 | 0 |
| 16 | MF | (Armenia) ARM | Wbeymar | 14 | 1 | 9+2 | 1 | 2+1 | 0 | 0 | 0 | 0 | 0 | 0 | 0 |
| 17 | FW | (Burkina Faso) BFA | Zakaria Sanogo | 32 | 2 | 21+2 | 1 | 2+2 | 1 | 1 | 0 | 0+1 | 0 | 3 | 0 |
| 19 | DF | (Colombia) COL | Junior Bueno | 13 | 1 | 8+1 | 1 | 4 | 0 | 0 | 0 | 0 | 0 | 0 | 0 |
| 21 | DF | (North Macedonia) MKD | Aleksandar Damčevski | 3 | 0 | 1 | 0 | 0 | 0 | 1 | 0 | 0+1 | 0 | 0 | 0 |
| 22 | MF | (Ukraine) UKR | Yehor Klymenchuk | 4 | 0 | 3+1 | 0 | 0 | 0 | 0 | 0 | 0 | 0 | 0 | 0 |
| 24 | FW | (Nigeria) NGR | Yusuf Otubanjo | 30 | 10 | 17+4 | 10 | 4 | 0 | 1 | 0 | 1 | 0 | 1+2 | 0 |
| 27 | MF | (Netherlands) NED | Furdjel Narsingh | 28 | 0 | 18+2 | 0 | 4 | 0 | 0 | 0 | 1 | 0 | 3 | 0 |
| 33 | GK | (Russia) RUS | Dmitry Abakumov | 19 | 0 | 15 | 0 | 4 | 0 | 0 | 0 | 0 | 0 | 0 | 0 |
| 55 | DF | (Armenia) ARM | David Terteryan | 16 | 1 | 10+3 | 0 | 1+2 | 1 | 0 | 0 | 0 | 0 | 0 | 0 |
| 77 | FW | (Armenia) ARM | Artur Serobyan | 16 | 0 | 4+9 | 0 | 0+3 | 0 | 0 | 0 | 0 | 0 | 0 | 0 |
| 79 | MF | (Ukraine) UKR | Serhiy Vakulenko | 24 | 3 | 15 | 1 | 4 | 0 | 1 | 0 | 1 | 0 | 3 | 2 |
| 87 | FW | (Armenia) ARM | Aleksandr Karapetyan | 16 | 4 | 10+2 | 4 | 1+3 | 0 | 0 | 0 | 0 | 0 | 0 | 0 |
| 91 | GK | (Serbia) SRB | Nikola Petrić | 4 | 0 | 3+1 | 0 | 0 | 0 | 0 | 0 | 0 | 0 | 0 | 0 |
| 94 | MF | (Moldova) MDA | Dan Spătaru | 11 | 0 | 5+3 | 0 | 3 | 0 | 0 | 0 | 0 | 0 | 0 | 0 |
| 99 | FW | (Armenia) ARM | Armen Hovhannisyan | 6 | 0 | 0+4 | 0 | 0+2 | 0 | 0 | 0 | 0 | 0 | 0 | 0 |
Players away on loan:
Players who left Ararat-Armenia during the season:
| 11 | MF | (Armenia) ARM | Hovhannes Harutyunyan | 4 | 0 | 1+2 | 0 | 0 | 0 | 0+1 | 0 | 0 | 0 | 0 | 0 |
| 22 | DF | (Armenia) ARM | Artur Danielyan | 5 | 0 | 2+2 | 0 | 0 | 0 | 1 | 0 | 0 | 0 | 0 | 0 |
| 25 | GK | (Serbia) SRB | Stefan Čupić | 11 | 0 | 6 | 0 | 0 | 0 | 1 | 0 | 1 | 0 | 3 | 0 |
| 63 | MF | (Ivory Coast) CIV | Kódjo | 6 | 0 | 3 | 0 | 0 | 0 | 1 | 0 | 1 | 0 | 1 | 0 |
| 93 | DF | (Haiti) HAI | Alex Christian | 6 | 0 | 2+2 | 0 | 0 | 0 | 0+1 | 0 | 0 | 0 | 1 | 0 |
| 94 | MF | (Cape Verde) CPV | Mailson Lima | 15 | 8 | 8+2 | 4 | 0 | 0 | 1 | 1 | 1 | 0 | 2+1 | 3 |
| 99 | FW | (Nigeria) NGR | Ogana Louis | 13 | 2 | 6+3 | 2 | 0 | 0 | 0+1 | 0 | 1 | 0 | 0+2 | 0 |

=== Goal scorers ===
| Place | Position | Nation | Number | Name | Premier League | Armenian Cup | Armenian Supercup | Champions League | Europa League | Total |
|---|---|---|---|---|---|---|---|---|---|---|
| 1 | FW | (Nigeria) | 24 | Yusuf Otubanjo | 10 | 0 | 0 | 0 | 0 | 10 |
| 2 | FW | (Cape Verde) | 94 | Mailson Lima | 4 | 0 | 1 | 0 | 3 | 8 |
| 3 | FW | (Armenia) | 87 | Aleksandr Karapetyan | 4 | 0 | 0 | 0 | 0 | 4 |
| 4 | FW | (Peru) | 9 | Jeisson Martínez | 2 | 0 | 0 | 0 | 1 | 3 |
| 4 | MF | (Ukraine) | 79 | Serhiy Vakulenko | 1 | 0 | 0 | 0 | 2 | 3 |
| 6 | FW | (Nigeria) | 99 | Ogana Louis | 2 | 0 | 0 | 0 | 0 | 2 |
| 6 | DF | (Spain) | 6 | David Bollo | 2 | 0 | 0 | 0 | 0 | 2 |
| 6 | FW | (Burkina Faso) | 17 | Zakaria Sanogo | 1 | 1 | 0 | 0 | 0 | 2 |
| 9 | MF | (Armenia) | 5 | Sargis Shahinyan | 1 | 0 | 0 | 0 | 0 | 1 |
| 9 | MF | (Armenia) | 16 | Wbeymar | 1 | 0 | 0 | 0 | 0 | 1 |
| 9 | DF | (Colombia) | 19 | Junior Bueno | 1 | 0 | 0 | 0 | 0 | 1 |
| 9 | MF | (France) | 8 | Yoan Gouffran | 0 | 1 | 0 | 0 | 0 | 1 |
| 9 | DF | (Armenia) | 55 | David Terteryan | 0 | 1 | 0 | 0 | 0 | 1 |
| 9 | | | | Own goal | 1 | 0 | 0 | 0 | 0 | 1 |
| | | | | Awarded | 3 | 0 | 0 | 0 | 0 | 3 |
| | | | | TOTALS | 33 | 3 | 1 | 0 | 5 | 42 |

=== Clean sheets ===
| Place | Position | Nation | Number | Name | Premier League | Armenian Cup | Armenian Supercup | Champions League | Europa League | Total |
|---|---|---|---|---|---|---|---|---|---|---|
| 1 | GK | (Russia) | 33 | Dmitry Abakumov | 7 | 1 | 0 | 0 | 0 | 8 |
| 2 | GK | (Serbia) | 25 | Stefan Čupić | 4 | 0 | 0 | 0 | 1 | 5 |
| | | | | TOTALS | 11 | 1 | 0 | 0 | 1 | 13 |

=== Disciplinary record ===
| Number | Nation | Position | Name | Premier League | | Armenian Cup | | Armenian Supercup | | Champions League | | Europa League | | Total | |
| Number | Nation | Position | Name | Booked | Sent off (straight red) | Booked | Sent off (straight red) | Booked | Sent off (straight red) | Booked | Sent off (straight red) | Booked | Sent off (straight red) | Booked | Sent off (straight red) |
| 2 | (Brazil) | DF | Alemão | 3 | 0 | 0 | 0 | 0 | 0 | 0 | 0 | 1 | 0 | 4 | 0 |
| 3 | (Portugal) | DF | Ângelo Meneses | 2 | 0 | 0 | 0 | 0 | 0 | 1 | 0 | 0 | 0 | 3 | 0 |
| 4 | (Armenia) | DF | Albert Khachumyan | 3 | 0 | 1 | 0 | 0 | 0 | 0 | 0 | 0 | 0 | 4 | 0 |
| 5 | (Armenia) | MF | Sargis Shahinyan | 2 | 1 | 0 | 0 | 0 | 0 | 0 | 0 | 0 | 0 | 2 | 1 |
| 6 | (Spain) | DF | David Bollo | 2 | 0 | 0 | 0 | 0 | 1 | 2 | 1 | 0 | 0 | 4 | 2 |
| 7 | (Democratic Republic of the Congo) | MF | Heradi Rashidi | 1 | 0 | 0 | 0 | 0 | 0 | 0 | 0 | 0 | 0 | 1 | 0 |
| 8 | (France) | MF | Yoan Gouffran | 3 | 0 | 0 | 1 | 0 | 0 | 0 | 0 | 1 | 0 | 5 | 0 |
| 9 | (Peru) | FW | Jeisson Martínez | 1 | 0 | 0 | 0 | 0 | 0 | 0 | 0 | 0 | 0 | 1 | 0 |
| 10 | (Russia) | MF | Armen Ambartsumyan | 3 | 0 | 0 | 0 | 0 | 0 | 0 | 0 | 1 | 0 | 4 | 0 |
| 11 | (Armenia) | MF | Armen Nahapetyan | 1 | 0 | 0 | 0 | 0 | 0 | 0 | 0 | 0 | 0 | 1 | 0 |
| 16 | (Armenia) | MF | Wbeymar | 5 | 0 | 1 | 0 | 0 | 0 | 0 | 0 | 0 | 0 | 6 | 0 |
| 17 | (Burkina Faso) | FW | Zakaria Sanogo | 3 | 1 | 0 | 0 | 0 | 0 | 0 | 0 | 2 | 0 | 5 | 1 |
| 19 | (Colombia) | DF | Junior Bueno | 4 | 1 | 0 | 0 | 0 | 0 | 0 | 0 | 0 | 0 | 4 | 1 |
| 22 | (Ukraine) | MF | Yehor Klymenchuk | 1 | 0 | 0 | 0 | 0 | 0 | 0 | 0 | 0 | 0 | 1 | 0 |
| 24 | (Nigeria) | FW | Yusuf Otubanjo | 1 | 0 | 2 | 0 | 0 | 0 | 0 | 0 | 0 | 0 | 3 | 0 |
| 33 | (Russia) | GK | Dmitry Abakumov | 1 | 0 | 0 | 0 | 0 | 0 | 0 | 0 | 0 | 0 | 1 | 0 |
| 55 | (Armenia) | DF | David Terteryan | 2 | 1 | 1 | 0 | 0 | 0 | 0 | 0 | 0 | 0 | 3 | 1 |
| 77 | (Armenia) | FW | Artur Serobyan | 2 | 0 | 0 | 0 | 0 | 0 | 0 | 0 | 0 | 0 | 2 | 0 |
| 79 | (Ukraine) | MF | Serhiy Vakulenko | 3 | 0 | 1 | 0 | 0 | 0 | 1 | 0 | 1 | 0 | 6 | 0 |
| 94 | (Moldova) | MF | Dan Spătaru | 1 | 0 | 0 | 0 | 0 | 0 | 0 | 0 | 0 | 0 | 1 | 0 |
Players who left Ararat-Armenia during the season:
| 22 | (Armenia) | DF | Artur Danielyan | 1 | 0 | 0 | 0 | 0 | 0 | 0 | 0 | 0 | 0 | 1 | 0 |
| 63 | (Ivory Coast) | MF | Kódjo | 1 | 0 | 0 | 0 | 0 | 0 | 1 | 0 | 0 | 0 | 2 | 0 |
| 93 | (Haiti) | DF | Alex Junior Christian | 0 | 0 | 0 | 0 | 0 | 0 | 0 | 0 | 2 | 1 | 2 | 1 |
| 94 | (Cape Verde) | MF | Mailson Lima | 2 | 0 | 0 | 0 | 0 | 0 | 0 | 0 | 0 | 0 | 2 | 0 |
| 99 | (Nigeria) | FW | Ogana Louis | 1 | 0 | 0 | 0 | 0 | 0 | 0 | 0 | 0 | 0 | 1 | 0 |
| | | | TOTALS | 49 | 4 | 6 | 0 | 1 | 1 | 5 | 1 | 8 | 1 | 69 | 7 |
