= Aleksandr Karapetyan =

Armenian footballer

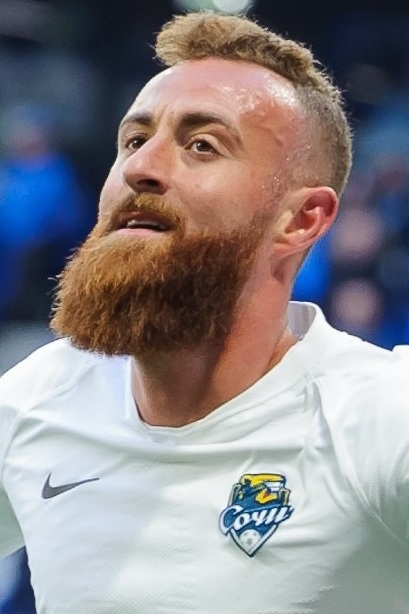
- Karapetyan with PFC Sochi in 2019

Personal information
- Date of birth: 23 December 1987 (age 38)
- Place of birth: Tbilisi, Georgian SSR, Soviet Union
- Height: 1.84 m (6 ft 0 in)
- Position: Forward

Team information
- Current team: SC Meso-Nassau

Senior career*
Years	Team	Apps	(Gls)
2008–2009	SV Wehen Wiesbaden II	12	(0)
2009–2010	FC Oberneuland	31	(9)
2010–2012	SV Elversberg	15	(2)
2012–2013	FC Homburg	16	(9)
2013	Dudelange	5	(2)
2013–2014	CS Grevenmacher	12	(10)
2014–2015	Dudelange	24	(15)
2015–2017	Victoria Rosport	35	(25)
2017–2019	Progrès Niederkorn	47	(40)
2019–2020	Sochi	21	(2)
2020–2021	FC Tambov	16	(3)
2021	Ararat-Armenia	12	(4)
2021	Noah	11	(4)
2022	Alashkert	6	(0)
2022	Pyunik	7	(0)
2023–2025	Kilikia		
2025	TSG Wörsdorf		
2025–	SC Meso-Nassau		

International career^{‡}
2014–2021	Armenia	25	(6)
- * Club domestic league appearances and goals as of 11 October 2023 ‡ National team caps and goals as of 11 October 2021

Aleksandr Karapetyan (Armenian: Ալեքսանդր Կարապետյան; born 23 December 1987) is an Armenian professional footballer who plays as a forward for SC Meso-Nassau.

== Club career ==
Karapetyan began his playing career in the German fourth-tier Regionalliga with Wehen Wiesbaden II, FC Oberneuland, SV 07 Elversberg and FC 08 Homburg. In 2013, he moved to F91 Dudelange of the Luxembourg National Division, and then on to CS Grevenmacher before returning to F91.

At the end of the 2014–15 Luxembourg National Division, his contract expired and he considered offers from China and Armenia but opted to remain in Western Europe, having trials at Germany's FC Erzgebirge Aue and SSV Jahn Regensburg before signing for FC Victoria Rosport in January 2016.

In May 2017, he signed a two-year contract with the option of a third at FC Progrès Niederkorn.

On 12 July 2019, he signed a contract with Russian Premier League newcomer PFC Sochi. He left Sochi on 31 July 2020.

On 3 August 2020, Karapetyan signed a two-year contract with FC Tambov, also in Russia's top flight.

On 9 February 2021, Karapetyan signed for Armenian champions Ararat-Armenia.

Karapetyan left Ararat-Armenia on 7 June 2021, signing for Noah the following day. Karapetyan left Noah after his contract was terminated by mutual consent on 29 December 2021.

On 2 September 2022, Karapetyan joined Pyunik and then left the club at the end of 2022.

In October 2023, Karapetyan scored four goals for Kilikia in their Armenian Cup first round victory over Falcons.

On 4 July 2025, Meso-Nassau Wiesbaden announced the signing of Karapetyan.

== International career ==
He made his debut for the Armenia national football team in the UEFA Euro 2016 qualifying on 11 October 2014, replacing Marcos Pizzelli for the last six minutes of a 1–1 draw with Serbia at the Republican Stadium in Yerevan, one minute after Pizzelli's penalty was saved by Vladimir Stojković.

After over four years without a cap, Karapetyan was recalled in November 2018 ahead of UEFA Nations League away games at Gibraltar and Liechtenstein. He scored his first international goal to complete a 6–2 UEFA Nations League win against the former on 16 November, and struck again three days later to ensure a 2–2 draw against the latter.

In June 2019, Karapetyan scored in consecutive games to win UEFA Euro 2020 qualifiers against Liechtenstein and Greece. On 5 August that year, he netted again to give Armenia a surprise lead at home to Italy in the next game of the campaign, but was sent off before half time in a 3–1 loss.

== Career statistics ==
=== Club ===
As of match played 9 October 2022

Appearances and goals by club, season and competition
Club	Season	League			National Cup		Continental		Other		Total	
Club	Season	Division	Apps	Goals	Apps	Goals	Apps	Goals	Apps	Goals	Apps	Goals
SV Wehen Wiesbaden II	2008–09	Regionalliga Süd	12	0	0	0	–		–		12	0
FC Oberneuland	2009–10	Regionalliga Nord	31	9	1	0	–		–		32	9
SV Elversberg	2010–11	Regionalliga West	15	2	0	0	–		–		15	2
SV Elversberg	2011–12	Regionalliga West	0	0	0	0	–		–		0	0
SV Elversberg	Total		15	2	0	0	0	0	0	0	15	2
FC Homburg	2012–13	Regionalliga Südwest	16	9	0	0	–		–		16	9
Dudelange	2012–13	Luxembourg National Division	4	2	0	0	–		–		4	2
Dudelange	2013–14	Luxembourg National Division	1	0	0	0	2 (Note: Appearances in the UEFA Europa League)	0	–		3	0
Dudelange	Total		5	2	0	0	2	0	0	0	7	2
CS Grevenmacher	2013–14	Luxembourg National Division	12	10	0	0	–		–		12	10
Dudelange	2014–15	Luxembourg National Division	24	15	0	0	2 (Note: Appearances in the UEFA Champions League)	0	–		26	15
Victoria Rosport	2015–16	Luxembourg National Division	11	6	0	0	–		–		11	6
Victoria Rosport	2016–17	Luxembourg National Division	24	19	0	0	–		–		24	19
Victoria Rosport	Total		35	25	0	0	0	0	0	0	35	25
Progrès Niederkorn	2017–18	Luxembourg National Division	23	29	0	0	4	0	–		27	29
Progrès Niederkorn	2018–19	Luxembourg National Division	24	11	0	0	5	1	–		29	12
Progrès Niederkorn	Total		47	40	0	0	9	1	0	0	56	41
Sochi	2019–20	Russian Premier League	21	2	1	0	–		–		22	2
FC Tambov	2020–21	Russian Premier League	16	3	1	0	–		–		17	3
Ararat-Armenia	2020–21	Armenian Premier League	12	4	4	0	0 (Note: Appearances in the UEFA Europa League and UEFA Champions League)	0	0 (Note: Appearance in the Armenian Supercup)	0	16	4
Noah	2021–22	Armenian Premier League	11	4	1	0	2 (Note: Appearances in the UEFA Europa Conference League)	0	–		14	4
Alashkert	2021–22	Armenian Premier League	3	0	0	0	0 (Note: Zero appearances and goals in the UEFA Champions League, UEFA Europa League and UEFA Europa Conference League)	0	0	0	3	0
Alashkert	2022–23	Armenian Premier League	3	0	0	0	2	0	–		5	0
Alashkert	Total		6	0	0	0	2	0	0	0	8	0
Pyunik	2022–23	Armenian Premier League	4	0	0	0	2	0	–		6	0
Career total			267	125	8	0	19	1	0	0	294	126

=== International ===
As of match played 11 October 2021

Appearances and goals by national team and year
National team	Year	Apps	Goals
Armenia	2014	2	0
Armenia	2018	2	2
Armenia	2019	9	3
Armenia	2020	6	1
Armenia	2021	6	0
Total		25	6

As of match played 8 September 2020
Scores and results list Armenia's goal tally first, score column indicates score after each Karapetyan goal.

List of international goals scored by Aleksandr Karapetyan
No.	Date	Venue	Cap	Opponent	Score	Result	Competition
1	16 November 2018	Victoria Stadium, Gibraltar	3	Gibraltar	6–2	6–2	2018–19 UEFA Nations League D
2	19 November 2018	Rheinpark Stadion, Vaduz, Liechtenstein	4	Liechtenstein	2–2	2–2	2018–19 UEFA Nations League D
3	8 June 2019	Hanrapetakan Stadium, Yerevan, Armenia	7	Liechtenstein	2–0	3–0	UEFA Euro 2020 qualification
4	11 June 2019	Olympic Stadium, Athens, Greece	8	Greece	1–0	3–2	UEFA Euro 2020 qualification
5	5 September 2019	Hanrapetakan Stadium, Yerevan, Armenia	9	Italy	1–0	1–3	UEFA Euro 2020 qualification
6	8 September 2020	Republican Stadium, Yerevan, Armenia	15	Estonia	1–0	2–0	2020–21 UEFA Nations League C
