= Grigori Trufanov =

Russian footballer

Personal information
- Full name: Grigori Konstantinovich Trufanov
- Date of birth: 13 June 1997 (age 29)
- Place of birth: Irkutsk, Russia
- Height: 1.90 m (6 ft 3 in)
- Position: Defender

Senior career*
Years	Team	Apps	(Gls)
2016	FC Baikal Irkutsk	14	(0)
2016–2018	FC Zenit Irkutsk	38	(1)
2018–2021	FC SKA-Khabarovsk	42	(0)
2021	FC SKA-Khabarovsk-2	10	(6)
2022	FC Noah	5	(0)
2022–2023	FC Nosta Novotroitsk	9	(0)
2023–2024	FC Irkutsk	27	(2)
- * Club domestic league appearances and goals as of 3 November 2024

Grigori Konstantinovich Trufanov (Russian: Григорий Константинович Труфанов; born 13 June 1997) is a Russian football player.

== Club career ==
He made his debut in the Russian Football National League for FC Baikal Irkutsk on 12 March 2016 in a game against FC Yenisey Krasnoyarsk.
