= Pavel Kireyenko =

Russian footballer

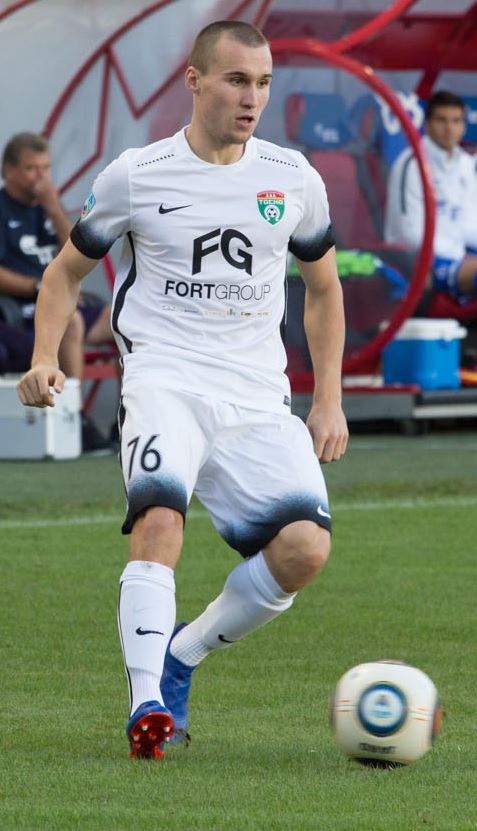
- Kireyenko with Tosno in 2016

Personal information
- Full name: Pavel Nikolayevich Kireyenko
- Date of birth: 14 June 1994 (age 32)
- Place of birth: Saint Petersburg, Russia
- Height: 1.75 m (5 ft 9 in)
- Position: Forward

Team information
- Current team: Dynamo St. Petersburg
- Number: 19

Youth career
- Zenit St.Petersburg

Senior career*
Years	Team	Apps	(Gls)
2012–2016	Zenit St.Petersburg	0	(0)
2013–2016	Zenit-2 St.Petersburg	92	(15)
2016–2017	Palanga	0	(0)
2016–2017	→ Tosno (loan)	15	(1)
2017–2018	Dynamo St.Petersburg	27	(4)
2018–2019	Sibir Novosibirsk	38	(6)
2019–2021	Tom Tomsk	35	(5)
2021–2022	Noah	27	(8)
2022–2023	Caspiy	26	(2)
2023–2024	Tobol	18	(0)
2024	Turan	18	(1)
2025	Alashkert	12	(1)
2025–2026	Sokol Saratov	28	(2)
2026–	Dynamo St. Petersburg	5	(0)
- * Club domestic league appearances and goals as of 1 November 2026

Pavel Nikolayevich Kireyenko (Russian: Павел Николаевич Киреенко; born 14 June 1994) is a Russian football player who plays for Dynamo St. Petersburg.

== Club career ==
He made his professional debut in the Russian Professional Football League for FC Zenit-2 St. Petersburg on 15 July 2013 in a game against FC Tosno. He made his Russian Football National League debut for Zenit-2 on 12 July 2015 in a game against FC Torpedo Armavir.

On 28 January 2022, Kireyenko left Noah by mutual consent.

On 18 February 2025, Armenian Premier League club Alashkert announced the singing of Kireyenko.
