= Jefferson Oliveira =

Brazilian footballer (born 1990)

Personal information
- Full name: Jefferson Alves Oliveira
- Date of birth: 25 February 1990 (age 36)
- Place of birth: São Paulo, Brazil
- Height: 1.93 m (6 ft 4 in)
- Position: Centre-back

Team information
- Current team: Rajasthan United

Youth career
- 2005–2007: Campo Grande
- 2008–2010: Udinese

Senior career*
Years	Team	Apps	(Gls)
2010–2013	Udinese	0	(0)
2011	→ Salernitana (loan)	19	(1)
2011–2012	→ Modena (loan)	11	(0)
2012–2013	→ Perugia (loan)	8	(0)
2013	→ Venezia (loan)	4	(1)
2013–2015	Vicenza	0	(0)
2013–2014	→ Bellaria (loan)	25	(0)
2014–2015	→ Juve Stabia (loan)	4	(0)
2015–2016	Atlético CP	27	(0)
2016–2017	Gil Vicente	5	(0)
2018	Famalicão		
2019–2020	Fátima	49	(1)
2020	Persik Kediri	3	(0)
2021	Noah	16	(0)
2022–2023	AO Ypato		
2023–	Rajasthan United		
- * Club domestic league appearances and goals as of 17 December 2021

Jefferson Alves Oliveira (born 25 February 1990) is a Brazilian professional footballer who plays as a defender for I-League club Rajasthan United.

== Playing career ==
=== Udinese ===
Jefferson Oliveira was a youth product of Italian club Udinese in Serie A. In the first half of 2010–11 season he was an overage player of Primavera under-20 team. He left for Salernitana along with Fabinho in January 2011. In 2011 Jefferson was signed by Serie B club Modena.

In July 2012 he left for Perugia along with Fabinho.

On 24 January 2013 he left for Venezia.

=== Vicenza ===
On 31 August 2013 Jefferson Oliveira was signed by the third division club Vicenza in a co-ownership deal, for €5,000. He immediately left fourth division club Bellaria in a temporary deal. In June 2014 Udinese gave up the remain 50% registration rights to Vicenza for free.

He wore number 28 for Vicenza in the 2014–15 season. However, he left for Juve Stabia in a temporary deal in September 2014.

=== Atletico CP ===
On 11 August 2015 Jefferson Oliveira was signed by club Atlético CP on a free transfer.

=== Noah ===
On 3 February 2021, Jefferson Oliveira signed for Noah. On 16 December 2021, Jefferson left Noah after his contract wasn't extended.
