= Jeisson Martínez =

Peruvian footballer (born 1994)

Personal information
- Full name: Jeisson Enrique Martínez Aranibar
- Date of birth: 28 December 1994 (age 31)
- Place of birth: Lima, Peru
- Height: 1.80 m (5 ft 11 in)
- Position: Forward

Team information
- Current team: Ordino
- Number: 19

Youth career
- Sporting Cristal

Senior career*
Years	Team	Apps	(Gls)
2012–2013	Celtic Castilla		
2013–2015	Rayo Majadahonda	31	(8)
2015–2016	Alcobendas	7	(0)
2016	Manzanares	18	(2)
2016	Aravaca	16	(7)
2017–2019	Rayo Majadahonda	45	(10)
2019	Murcia	8	(0)
2019–2020	Fuenlabrada	35	(6)
2020–2021	Ararat-Armenia	13	(2)
2021–2022	Albacete	13	(1)
2022–2024	Rayo Majadahonda	33	(2)
2024–2025	Melilla	12	(0)
2025	Tudelano	5	(0)
2025–2026	Binacional	0	(0)
2025–	Ordino	4	(1)
- * Club domestic league appearances and goals as of 15 June 2026

Jeisson Enrique Martínez Aranibar (born 28 December 1994) is a Peruvian footballer who plays as a forward for Andorran club Ordino. He also holds a Spanish passport.

== Club career ==
Born in Lima, Martínez was a Sporting Cristal youth graduate before moving to Spain in 2012. He made his senior debut with Celtic Castilla CF in the regional leagues, before joining Tercera División side CF Rayo Majadahonda in 2013.

After achieving promotion to Segunda División B, Martínez moved to Fútbol Alcobendas Sport still in the fourth tier. After being rarely used, he signed for fellow league team Manzanares CF on 15 January 2016.

In July 2016, Martínez agreed to a contract with Aravaca CF in the fourth division. On 30 December he returned to Rayo Majadahonda, and contributed with eight goals in 27 appearances during the 2017–18 campaign as his side achieved promotion to Segunda División for the first time ever.

Martínez made his professional debut on 19 August 2018, starting in a 1–2 away loss against Real Zaragoza. The following 28 January, after featuring sparingly, he moved to third division side Real Murcia after terminating his contract with the Majariegos.

On 3 April 2019, Martínez joined fellow third division side CF Fuenlabrada after agreeing to a 18-month deal. He immediately became a starter, contributing with two goals in six league appearances as his side achieved promotion to the second level for the first time ever.

On 9 September 2020, Martínez signed for FC Ararat-Armenia. On 22 June 2021, Albacete Balompié announced the signing of Martínez from Ararat-Armenia.
