= Aleksandr Golovnya (footballer, born 1998) =

Russian footballer

Personal information
- Full name: Aleksandr Yegorovich Golovnya
- Date of birth: 27 October 1998 (age 28)
- Place of birth: Moscow, Russia
- Height: 1.93 m (6 ft 4 in)
- Position: Defender

Team information
- Current team: Dynamo Vologda
- Number: 24

Senior career*
Years	Team	Apps	(Gls)
2016	Solyaris Moscow	6	(0)
2017	Strogino Moscow	8	(0)
2017	Tyumen	1	(0)
2018–2019	Strogino Moscow	19	(0)
2019–2021	Rodina Moscow	27	(0)
2020	→ Tambov (loan)	1	(0)
2021	→ Noah (loan)	2	(0)
2022–2023	Saturn Ramenskoye	20	(2)
2023–2025	Spartak Tambov	56	(2)
2025–2026	Ryazan	12	(0)
2026–	Dynamo Vologda	9	(0)
- * Club domestic league appearances and goals as of 1 November 2026

Aleksandr Yegorovich Golovnya (Russian: Александр Егорович Головня; born 27 October 1998) is a Russian football player who plays for Dynamo Vologda.

== Club career ==
He made his debut in the Russian Professional Football League for Solyaris Moscow on 2 October 2016 in a game against Torpedo Vladimir.

He made his Russian Football National League debut for Tyumen on 16 September 2017 in a game against Dynamo Saint Petersburg.

On 7 August 2020, he joined Russian Premier League club Tambov on a season-long loan. He made his Russian Premier League debut for Tambov on 22 August 2020 in a game against Zenit Saint Petersburg. His loan was terminated by Tambov on 9 October 2020.
