= Diogo Pimentel =

Footballer (born 1997)

Personal information
- Full name: Diogo Miguel Zambujo Pimentel
- Date of birth: 16 July 1997 (age 29)
- Place of birth: Portugal
- Position: Midfielder

Team information
- Current team: FC UNA Strassen
- Number: 3

Youth career
- Sporting Clube Figueirense
- Despertar

Senior career*
Years	Team	Apps	(Gls)
2015–2016	Jeunesse Schieren		
2016–2020	Etzella	72	(6)
2020–2023	Fola	51	(5)
2022–2023	→ Jammerbugt (loan)	11	(0)
2023–	FC UNA Strassen	83	(3)

International career^{‡}
2022–	Luxembourg	1	(0)
- * Club domestic league appearances and goals as of 6 June 2026 ‡ National team caps and goals as of 20:52, 23 November 2022 (UTC)

Diogo Miguel Zambujo Pimentel (born 16 July 1997) is a footballer who plays as a midfielder for UNA Strassen. Born in Portugal, he has represented Luxembourg internationally.

== Club career ==
Pimentel started his career with Luxembourgish third-tier side Jeunesse Schieren. In 2016, he signed for Etzella in the Luxembourgish second tier, helping them earn promotion to the Luxembourgish top flight. In 2020, Pimentel signed for Luxembourgish top flight club Fola, helping them win the league.

Before the second half of 2021–22, he was sent on loan to Jammerbugt in Denmark.

== International career ==
On 25 September 2022, he made his senior debut for the Luxembourg, coming off the bench in a 1–0 2022–23 UEFA Nations League victory over Lithuania.
