= Nikola Petrić =

Serbian footballer (born 1991)

Personal information
- Date of birth: 11 May 1991 (age 35)
- Place of birth: Čačak, SFR Yugoslavia
- Height: 1.93 m (6 ft 4 in)
- Position: Goalkeeper

Team information
- Current team: Borac Čačak
- Number: 91

Youth career
- 1998–2010: Borac Čačak

Senior career*
Years	Team	Apps	(Gls)
2009–2015	Borac Čačak	67	(0)
2010	→ Mladost Lučani (loan)	4	(0)
2015–2017	Čukarički	30	(0)
2017–2018	Mladost Lučani	4	(0)
2018	IF Brommapojkarna	30	(0)
2019	Panachaiki	2	(0)
2019–2021	Proleter Novi Sad	47	(0)
2021	Ararat-Armenia	4	(0)
2021–2022	Proleter Novi Sad	34	(0)
2022–2023	Napredak Kruševac	31	(0)
2023–2024	Al-Bukiryah	31	(0)
2025–	Borac Čačak	5	(0)
- * Club domestic league appearances and goals as of 14 May 2026

Nikola Petrić (Serbian Cyrillic: Никола Петрић; born 11 May 1991) is a Serbian professional footballer who plays as a goalkeeper for Borac Čačak.

== Career ==
=== Borac Čačak ===
Born in Čačak, where he passed youth categories with local club Borac Čačak, Nikola made his first senior appearances with Mladost Lučani in the Serbian First League as a loaned player, during the first half of the 2010–11 season. After returning to Borac, Petrić was usually used as a backup option, without appearances until the last two matches of the 2011–12 Serbian SuperLiga season. Later, after the club got relegated to the Serbian First League, Petrić became the first choice. Petrić became a captain and continued keeping until the end of 2014, when he refused an offer to sign new deal with club. He spent the spring half of 2014–15 Serbian SuperLiga season without of team, and after the end of contract, he left the club in summer 2015.

=== Čukarički ===
In summer 2015, Petrić joined Čukarički as a free agent, and took jersey number 1, after Borivoje Ristić left the club. He spent the whole 2015–16 season as a reserve for Nemanja Stevanović and later he started next season at the same position, but after Stevanović left to Partizan, Petrić made his debut for club in second fixture of the 2016–17 Serbian SuperLiga season. He collected 34 appearances in both domestic competitions until the end of same season.

=== IF Brommapojkarna ===
Petrić signed with IF Brommapojkarna in January 2018. He left the club again at the end of the year.

=== Al-Bukiryah ===
On 27 June 2023, Petrić joined Saudi Arabian club Al-Bukiryah.

== Career statistics ==
As of 21 July 2017

Club	Season	League			Cup		Continental		Other		Total	
Club	Season	Division	Apps	Goals	Apps	Goals	Apps	Goals	Apps	Goals	Apps	Goals
Borac Čačak	2009–10	Serbian SuperLiga	0	0	0	0	—		—		0	0
Borac Čačak	2010–11	Serbian SuperLiga	0	0	0	0	—		—		0	0
Borac Čačak	2011–12	Serbian SuperLiga	2	0	0	0	—		—		2	0
Borac Čačak	2012–13	Serbian First League	22	0	3	0	—		—		25	0
Borac Čačak	2013–14	Serbian First League	28	0	1	0	—		—		29	0
Borac Čačak	2014–15	Serbian SuperLiga	15	0	0	0	—		—		15	0
Borac Čačak	Total		67	0	4	0	—		—		71	0
Mladost Lučani (loan)	2010–11	Serbian First League	4	0	0	0	—		—		4	0
Čukarički	2015–16	Serbian SuperLiga	0	0	0	0	0	0	—		0	0
Čukarički	2016–17	Serbian SuperLiga	30	0	4	0	0	0	—		34	0
Čukarički	2017–18	Serbian SuperLiga	0	0	0	0	—		—		0	0
Čukarički	Total		30	0	4	0	0	0	—		34	0
Career total			101	0	8	0	0	0	—		109	0

== Personal life ==
Petrić married Tamara Pavlović, a football referee in the Serbian women Super Liga.

== Honours ==
Individual

- Serbian SuperLiga Player of the Week: 2021–22 (Round 16)
