= Pavel Ovchinnikov =

Russian footballer (born 1998)

Personal information
- Full name: Pavel Vladimirovich Ovchinnikov
- Date of birth: 24 March 1998 (age 28)
- Place of birth: Moscow, Russia
- Height: 1.88 m (6 ft 2 in)
- Position: Goalkeeper

Youth career
- CSKA Moscow

Senior career*
Years	Team	Apps	(Gls)
2015–2018	CSKA Moscow	0	(0)
2019–2020	Dolgoprudny	15	(0)
2020–2021	Veles Moscow	12	(0)
2021	Noah	3	(0)
2022	Olimp-Dolgoprudny-2	5	(0)
2022	Kosmos Dolgoprudny	5	(0)
2023	Ryazan	0	(0)

International career^{‡}
2013	Russia U-15	6	(0)
2013–2014	Russia U-16	5	(0)
2014	Russia U-17	1	(0)
- * Club domestic league appearances and goals as of 10 June 2023 ‡ National team caps and goals as of 24 August 2014

Pavel Vladimirovich Ovchinnikov (Russian: Павел Владимирович Овчинников; born 24 March 1998) is a Russian football player. He plays as goalkeeper.

== Club career ==
He made his debut in the Russian Football National League for FC Veles Moscow on 17 October 2020 in a game against FC Chertanovo Moscow.

On 7 July 2021, Ovchinnikov signed for Noah, leaving the club on 21 December 2021.
