= 2017–18 Artsakh FC season =

Artsakh
2017–18 season
- Manager: Tigran Yesayan; Armen Sanamyan
- Stadium: Nairi Stadium
- First League: 2nd
- Armenian Cup: Quarterfinal vs Alashkert
- Top goalscorer: League: Grigor Aghekyan (18); All: Grigor Aghekyan (19)

The 2017–18 season was Artsakh's 1st season in existence, in which they finished Second in the First League, gaining promotion to the Armenian Premier League, whilst they were knocked out of the Armenian Cup by Alashkert in the Quarter-finals.

== Squad ==
As of match played 28 May 2018

Number	Name	Nationality	Position	Date of birth (age)	Signed from	Signed in	Contract ends	Apps.	Goals
Goalkeepers
1	Samur Agamagomedov	(Russia)	GK	30 November 1998 (aged 19)	Nika Moscow	2018		11	0
95	Erik Meliksetyan	(Armenia)	GK	26 August 2000 (aged 17)	Banants	2018		3	0
99	Arman Hovhannisyan	(Armenia)	GK	7 July 1992 (aged 25)	Kotayk	2017		6	0
Defenders
2	Aghavard Petrosyan	(Armenia)	DF	16 April 1997 (aged 21)	Banants	2018		11	2
3	Hamlet Asoyan	(Armenia)	DF	13 January 1995 (aged 23)	Homenetmen Beirut	2018		12	3
4	Eric Nazaryan	(Armenia)	DF	14 March 1996 (aged 22)	Ararat Yerevan	2018		11	1
5	Gor Mkrtumyan	(Armenia)	DF	24 May 1992 (aged 26)	Kotayk	2017		25	4
12	Rostislav Golovach	(Russia)	DF	4 July 1996 (aged 21)	Nika Moscow	2017		21	0
15	Vadim Hayriyan	(Armenia)	DF	6 April 1997 (aged 21)		2017		7	0
22	Hakob Hambardzumyan	(Armenia)	DF	26 May 1997 (aged 21)	on loan from Banants	2017		9	1
Midfielders
6	Walter Poghosyan	(Armenia)	MF	16 May 1992 (aged 26)	Gandzasar Kapan	2018		8	3
7	Karen Harutyunyan	(Armenia)	MF	6 July 1995 (aged 22)	Banants	2017		26	3
10	Artur Grigoryan	(Armenia)	MF	10 July 1993 (aged 24)	Alashkert	2017		24	2
11	Eduard Avagyan	(Armenia)	MF	21 March 1996 (aged 22)	Banants	2017		16	4
14	Mykhaylo Babiy	(Ukraine)	MF	13 May 1995 (aged 23)		2018		10	6
16	Dmitry Dushin	(Russia)	MF	2 August 1996 (aged 21)	Strogino Moscow	2017		10	1
17	Muslim Bammatgereev	(Russia)	MF	15 January 1996 (aged 22)	Erebuni	2018		7	1
18	Tigran Simonyan	(Armenia)	MF	9 June 1998 (aged 19)	Ararat Yerevan	2017		4	0
19	Armo Adamyan	(Armenia)	MF	30 April 1996 (aged 22)	Mika	2017		7	0
21	Arsen Hovhannisyan	(Armenia)	MF	1 March 1996 (aged 22)	Gandzasar Kapan	2017		25	3
26	Arsen Harutyunyan	(Armenia)	MF			2017		2	0
33	Emil Yeghiazaryan	(Armenia)	MF	3 November 1997 (aged 20)	Banants	2018		11	5
77	Rafael Ghazaryan	(Armenia)	MF	17 May 1990 (aged 28)	Gandzasar Kapan	2018		7	1
Forwards
8	Ramazan Isayev	(Russia)	FW	17 January 1998 (aged 20)	Unattached	2018		11	5
9	Grigor Aghekyan	(Armenia)	FW	8 April 1996 (aged 22)	Banants	2017		26	19
Players who left during the season
1	Arman Hovhannisyan	(Armenia)	GK	14 May 1993 (aged 25)	Alashkert	2017		2	0
2	Zhora Nazaryan	(Armenia)	DF	8 February 1995 (aged 23)	Kotayk	2017		6	0
3	Vazgen Yeranosyan	(Armenia)	DF	9 November 1999 (aged 18)	Banants	2017		15	0
4	Armen Durunts	(Armenia)	DF	1 November 1990 (aged 27)	Ararat Yerevan	2017		13	0
6	Vahan Adloyan	(Armenia)	DF	23 January 1996 (aged 22)	Erebuni	2017		11	1
10	Narek Gyozalyan	(Armenia)	MF	10 July 1992 (aged 25)	Kotayk	2017		9	2
14	Arthur Sahakyan	(Armenia)	DF	24 July 1992 (aged 25)	Alashkert	2017		15	1
16	Vahe Mirakyan	(Armenia)	MF	6 January 1993 (aged 25)	Ararat Yerevan	2017		9	0
17	Davit Babayan	(Armenia)	MF	30 March 1998 (aged 20)	Banants	2017		15	1
22	Karen Shakhkeldyan	(Armenia)	MF	8 November 1993 (aged 24)		2017		9	0
33	Yegor Lugovyi	(Ukraine)	DF	9 April 1995 (aged 23)	Sumy	2017		7	0
33	David Asatryan	(Armenia)	MF	10 January 1995 (aged 23)	Unattached	2017		1	0
77	Narek Ghassumyan	(Armenia)	FW	13 December 1999 (aged 18)		2017		9	0
88	Viktor Martyan	(Ukraine)	FW	20 September 1994 (aged 23)	Ytterhogdals	2017		8	2
88	Davit Israelyan	(Armenia)	DF			2017		1	0
95	Grigor Makaryan	(Armenia)	GK	19 April 1995 (aged 23)	Banants	2017		15	0

== Transfers ==
=== In ===
Date	Position	Nationality	Name	From	Fee	Ref.
Winter 2018	GK	(Armenia)	Erik Meliksetyan	Banants	Undisclosed	
Winter 2018	GK	(Russia)	Samur Agamagomedov	Nika Moscow	Undisclosed	
Winter 2018	DF	(Armenia)	Hamlet Asoyan	Homenetmen Beirut	Undisclosed	
Winter 2018	DF	(Armenia)	Eric Nazaryan	Ararat Yerevan	Undisclosed	
Winter 2018	DF	(Armenia)	Aghavard Petrosyan	Banants	Undisclosed	
Winter 2018	DF	(Russia)	Egor Shunin	Nika Moscow	Undisclosed	
Winter 2018	DF	(Russia)	Egor Shunin	Nika Moscow	Undisclosed	
Winter 2018	MF	(Armenia)	David Asatryan	Unattached	Free	
Winter 2018	MF	(Armenia)	Rafael Ghazaryan	Gandzasar Kapan	Undisclosed	
Winter 2018	MF	(Armenia)	Walter Poghosyan	Gandzasar Kapan	Undisclosed	
Winter 2018	MF	(Armenia)	Emil Yeghiazaryan	Banants	Undisclosed	
Winter 2018	MF	(Russia)	Muslim Bammatgereev	Erebuni	Undisclosed	
Winter 2018	MF	(Russia)	Dmitry Dushin	Strogino Moscow	Undisclosed	
Winter 2018	MF	(Ukraine)	Mykhaylo Babiy			
Winter 2018	FW	(Russia)	Ramazan Isayev	Unattached	Free	

=== Loans in ===
Date from	Position	Nationality	Name	From	Date to	Ref.
Winter 2018	DF	(Armenia)	Hakob Hambardzumyan	Banants	30 June 2019	

=== Out ===
Date	Position	Nationality	Name	To	Fee	Ref.
Winter 2018	DF	(Armenia)	Vahe Mirakyan	Gandzasar Kapan	Undisclosed	
Winter 2018	DF	(Ukraine)	Yegor Lugovyi	Sumy	Undisclosed	
Winter 2018	FW	(Ukraine)	Viktor Martyan	Mykolaiv	Undisclosed	

=== Released ===
Date	Position	Nationality	Name	Joined	Date	Ref.
Winter 2018	GK	(Armenia)	Grigor Makaryan			
Winter 2018	GK	(Armenia)	Albert Ohanyan			
Winter 2018	DF	(Armenia)	Armen Durunts			
Winter 2018	DF	(Armenia)	Zhora Nazaryan			
Winter 2018	DF	(Armenia)	Arthur Sahakyan			
Winter 2018	MF	(Armenia)	Vahan Adloyan			
Winter 2018	MF	(Armenia)	David Asatryan			
Winter 2018	MF	(Armenia)	Davit Babayan			
Winter 2018	MF	(Armenia)	Narek Gyozalyan			
Winter 2018	MF	(Armenia)	Davit Israelyan			
Winter 2018	MF	(Armenia)	Karen Shakhkeldyan			

== Competitions ==
=== Overall record ===
Competition	First match	Last match	Starting round	Final position	Record							
Competition	First match	Last match	Starting round	Final position	Pld	W	D	L	GF	GA	GD	Win %
First League	7 August 2017	21 May 2018	Matchday 1	2nd	27	21	2	4	77	16	+61	77.78
Armenian Cup	14 September 2017	19 October 2017	Quarterfinal	Quarterfinal	2	0	0	2	1	9	−8	0.00
Total					29	21	2	6	78	25	+53	72.41

Last updated: 21 May 2018
Source: Competitions

=== First League ===
==== Table ====
Pos	Team	Pld	W	D	L	GF	GA	GD	Pts	Promotion
1	Lori (C, P)	27	22	3	2	74	16	+58	69	Promotion to the Premier League
2	Artsakh (P)	27	21	2	4	77	16	+61	65	Promotion to the Premier League
3	Ararat-Moskva (P)	27	14	4	9	65	41	+24	46	Promotion to the Premier League
4	Banants-2	27	14	3	10	45	42	+3	45	Ineligible for promotion
5	Pyunik-2	27	13	1	13	49	44	+5	40	Ineligible for promotion
6	Alashkert-2	27	12	4	11	48	42	+6	40	Ineligible for promotion
7	Ararat Yerevan-2	27	7	4	16	36	55	−19	25	Ineligible for promotion
8	Erebuni	27	6	4	17	33	91	−58	22	
9	Gandzasar Kapan-2	27	6	2	19	31	74	−43	20	Ineligible for promotion
10	Shirak-2	27	5	3	19	22	59	−37	18	Ineligible for promotion

Source: Football Federation of Armenia (in Armenian)
Rules for classification: 1) Points; 2) Play-off (only if deciding champion); 3) Matches won; 4) Head-to-head points; 5) Head-to-head matches won; 6) Head-to-head goal difference; 7) Head-to-head goals scored; 8) Head-to-head away goals scored; 9) Goal difference; 10) Goals scored.
(C) Champions; (P) Promoted

==== Results summary ====
Overall								Home						Away					
Pld	W	D	L	GF	GA	GD	Pts	W	D	L	GF	GA	GD	W	D	L	GF	GA	GD
27	21	2	4	77	16	+61	65	10	1	2	40	5	+35	11	1	2	37	11	+26

Last updated: 21 May 2018.
Source: See Results

==== Results ====
7 August 2017 1	Alashkert-2	1–1	Artsakh	Yerevan
18:00 (UTC+4)	Grigoryan (yellow card) 24'; Sahakyan 79'	Report	Mkrtumyan (yellow card) 24'; Babayan 52'	Stadium: Nairi Stadium; Referee: Henrik Nalbandian

14 August 2017 2	Artsakh	1–0	Banants-2	Yerevan
18:00 (UTC+4)	Mkrtumyan (yellow card) 23'; Aghekyan (yellow card) 34'; Avagyan 61'	Report	Hambardzumyan (yellow card) 23'; Sadoyan (yellow card) 67'; Petrosyan (yellow card) 90+2'	Stadium: Armenia Sports Union Stadium; Referee: Arman Alaberkyan

21 August 2017 3	Gandzasar Kapan-2	0–3	Artsakh	Kapan
17:00 (UTC+4)	Petrosyan (yellow card) 64'; Martirosyan (yellow card) 90+2'	Report	Mkrtumyan (yellow card) 28' (goal) 90+3'; Avagyan 57'; Gyozalyan 59'; Lugovyi (yellow card) 77'	Stadium: Gandzasar Kapan Training Centre; Referee: Artur Safaryan

28 August 2017 4	Artsakh	1–0	Ararat Yerevan-2	Yerevan
17:00 (UTC+4)	Gyozalyan (yellow card) 61'; Mkrtumyan 90+2'	Report	Arustamyan (yellow card) 7'; Gareginyan (yellow card) 90+2'	Stadium: Armenia Sports Union Stadium; Referee: Ashot Ghaltakhchyan

11 September 2017 5	Avan Academy	1–2	Artsakh	Yerevan
16:00 (UTC+4)	A.Hovhannisyan 81'; Harutyunyan (yellow card) 89'	Report	Aghekyan 62', 67'	Stadium: FFA Academy Stadium; Attendance: 400; Referee: Arman Alaberkyan

18 September 2017 6	Artsakh	0–1	Lori	Yerevan
16:00 (UTC+4)	K.Harutyunyan (yellow card) 45'; Golovach (yellow card) 68'; Aghekyan (yellow card) 72'; Lugovyi (yellow card) 72'; Martyan (yellow card) 72'; Gyozalyan (red card) 90+1'	Report	Oyuma (yellow card) 57'; Mensah 63'; Matevosyan (yellow card) 72'; Kouassi (yellow card) 72'; Avetisyan (yellow card) 74'; Gharibyan (red card) 85'; Asatryan (red card) 90+1'	Stadium: Armenia Sports Union Stadium; Referee: Artur Safaryan

25 September 2017 7	Pyunik-2	0–1	Artsakh	Yerevan
16:00 (UTC+4)	Spertsyan (yellow card) 22'	Report	Mkrtumyan 39'; Adloyan (yellow card) 72'	Stadium: Pyunik Stadium; Referee: Arman Alaberkyan

16 October 2017 8	Artsakh	3–0	Shirak-2	Yerevan
16:00 (UTC+4)	K.Harutyunyan 11'; Mkrtumyan 50'; Aghekyan 69'; Yeranosyan (yellow card) 90+2'	Report	Urushanyan (yellow card) 87'	Stadium: Armenia Sports Union Stadium; Referee: Henrik Nalbandian

23 October 2017 9	Erebuni	1–4	Artsakh	Yerevan
15:00 (UTC+4)	Kodzaev 83'	Report	K.Harutyunyan 4', 7'; Aghekyan 21', 25'	Stadium: Pyunik Stadium; Referee: Arman Alaberkyan

30 October 2017 10	Artsakh	1–0	Alashkert-2	Yerevan
15:00 (UTC+4)	Sahakyan 75'; K.Harutyunyan (yellow card) 79'; Mkrtumyan (yellow card) 80'; Durunts (yellow card) 90+4'	Report	Zolghadr (yellow card) 51'	Stadium: Pyunik Stadium; Referee: Vardan Manukyan

20 November 2017 12	Artsakh	2–1	Gandzasar Kapan-2	Yerevan
14:00 (UTC+4)	Hovhannisyan 44'; Aghekyan (yellow card) 77' (goal) 85'	Report	Stepanyan (yellow card) 59'; Simonyan 76'	Stadium: Pyunik Stadium; Referee: Arman Alaberkyan

23 November 2017 11	Banants-2	0–3	Artsakh	Yerevan
14:00 (UTC+4)	Hambardzumyan (yellow card) 38'; Adamyan (yellow card) 66'	Report	Hovhannisyan 34'; Aghekyan 40'; Adloyan 90+3'	Stadium: Urartu-2 Stadium; Referee: Ashot Ghaltakhchyan

27 November 2017 13	Ararat Yerevan-2	2–0	Artsakh	Dzoraghbyur
14:0 (UTC+4)	Mkrtumyan 70' (o.g.); Silas (yellow card) 82'; Arustamyan (yellow card) 88'; Kirakosyan 89'	Report	Mkrtumyan (yellow card) 62'; Sahakyan (yellow card) 88'	Stadium: Dzoraghbyur Training Centre; Referee: Shahen Aghayan

4 December 2017 14	Artsakh	1–2	Avan Academy	Ashtarak
14:00 (UTC+4)	Gyozalyan 26'	Report	A.Hovhannisyan 61', 89'; Geghamyan (yellow card) 78'; Petrosyan (yellow card) 87'	Stadium: Kasakhi Marzik Stadium; Referee: Ashot Ghaltakchyan

5 March 2018 15	Lori	2–0	Artsakh	Vanadzor
14:00 (UTC+4)	Avetisyan 11'; Azatyan (yellow card) 70'; Aliyu (yellow card) 84'; Iwu 90+5'	Report	Dushin (yellow card) 70'; Hambardzumyan (yellow card) 90+2'	Stadium: Vanadzor Football Academy; Referee: Artur Safaryan

12 March 2018 16	Artsakh	5–0	Pyunik-2	Dzoraghbyur
14:00 (UTC+4)	Asoyan 4', 34'; Grigoryan 17'; Begoyan 39' (o.g.); Yeghiazaryan (yellow card) 45'; Isayev 88'	Report	Poghosyan (yellow card) 33'	Stadium: Dzoraghbyur Training Centre; Referee: Ashot Ghaltakhchyan

19 March 2018 17	Shirak-2	0–4	Artsakh	Gyumri
14:00 (UTC+4)	Tsaturyan (yellow card) 73'	Report	Aghekyan 44', 45'; Yeghiazaryan 58'; Isayev 81'	Stadium: Football Academy; Referee: Artur Safaryan

26 March 2018 18	Artsakh	12–0	Erebuni	Dzoraghbyur
14:00 (UTC+4)	Yeghiazaryan 12', 39' (yellow card) 29'; Aghekyan 14', 25', 46'; Petrosyan (yellow card) 36'; Avagyan 43'; Babiy 48', 90'; Hovhannisyan 56'; Grigoryan 71'; Poghosyan 75'; Isayev 76'	Report	Davidyan (yellow card) 29'; Yenokyan (yellow card) 38'	Stadium: Dzoraghbyur Training Centre; Referee: Henrik Nalbandian

3 April 2018 19	Alashkert-2	1–4	Artsakh	Ashtarak
15:00 (UTC+4)	Vazitdinov (yellow card) 14'; Jindoyan (yellow card) 70'; Yeghiazaryan 74'	Report	Ghazaryan 7'; Nazaryan (yellow card) 17'; Aghekyan 37'; Yeghiazaryan 61'; K.Harutyunyan (yellow card) 72'; Poghosyan 90+2'	Stadium: Kasakhi Marzik Stadium; Referee: Henrik Nalbandian

16 April 2018 21	Gandzasar Kapan-2	2–5	Artsakh	Kapan
16:00 (UTC+4)	Arakelyan (yellow card) 11'; Karapetyan (yellow card) 68'; Mirakyan 86'; Gevorgyan 87'	Report	Kharbutyan 7' (o.g.); Isayev 15'; Dushin 59' (yellow card) 90+1'; Martyan 87'; Babiy 90+3'	Stadium: Gandzasar Kapan Training Centre; Referee: Arthur Tavakalyan

23 April 2018 22	Artsakh	4–1	Ararat Yerevan-2	Dzoraghbyur
16:00 (UTC+4)	Bammatgereev 18'; Hovhannisyan 64' (o.g.); Aghekyan 66', 87'	Report	Trajkoski 7'; Hovhannisyan (yellow card) 20'	Stadium: Dzoraghbyur Training Centre; Referee: Artur Safaryan

27 April 2018 20	Artsakh	7–0	Banants-2	Dzoraghbyur
16:00 (UTC+4)	Poghosyan 12'; Yeghiazaryan 15' (yellow card) 27'; Nazaryan (yellow card) 37'; Aghekyan 43'; Isayev 49'; Babiy 66', 88'; Martyan 67'	Report	Fagner (yellow card) 22'; Khachatryan (yellow card) 35'	Stadium: Dzoraghbyur Training Centre; Referee: Gevorg Yeghoyan

30 April 2018 23	Ararat-Moskva	0–2	Artsakh	Yerevan
17:00 (UTC+4)	Sargsyan (yellow card) 14'; Khachumyan (yellow card) 69'	Report	Asoyan 15'; Avagyan (yellow card) 81' (goal) 90+5'	Stadium: FFA Academy Stadium; Attendance: 100; Referee: Vardan Manukyan
Note: Ararat-Moskva began the season under the name of Avan Academy, but were renamed to Ararat-Moskva at the beginning of 2018

5 May 2018 26	Artsakh	3–0	Shirak-2	Yerevan
16:00 (UTC+4)				Stadium: Academy Stadium
Note: Match awarded to Artsakh.

7 May 2018 24	Artsakh	0–0	Lori	Dzoraghbyur
17:00 (UTC+4)	Mkrtumyan (yellow card) 59'; Yeghiazaryan (yellow card) 62'; Hovhannisyan (yellow card) 80'	Report	Asatryan (yellow card) 59'; Oyuma (yellow card) 89'; Elyazyan (yellow card) 90+2'; Iwu (yellow card) 90+3'	Stadium: Dzoraghbyur Training Centre; Referee: Henrik Nalbandian

14 May 2018 25	Pyunik-2	0–3	Artsakh	Yerevan
17:00 (UTC+4)	Khachikyan (yellow card) 29'; Grigoryan (yellow card) 72'	Report	S.Harutyunyan 4' (o.g.); Hambardzumyan 20' (yellow card) 32'; Babiy 80'	Stadium: Pyunik Stadium; Referee: Artur Safaryan

28 May 2018 27	Erebuni	1–5	Artsakh	Ashtarak
17:00 (UTC+4)	Tadevosyan 45+1'	Report	Aghekyan 18', 34'; Nazaryan 63'; Hovhannisyan (yellow card) 74'; Petrosyan 82', 90+1'	Stadium: Kasakhi Marzik Stadium; Referee: Artush Kerobyan

=== Armenian Cup ===
21 September 2017 Quarter-final 1st leg	Artsakh	1–3	Alashkert	Yerevan
16:00 (UTC+4)	Aghekyan 9'	Report	Manasyan 27', 62'; Peltier (yellow card) 44'; Artu.Yedigaryan 73' (pen.)	Stadium: Mika Stadium; Referee: Shahen Aghayan

19 October 2017 Quarter-final 2nd leg	Alashkert	6–0 (9–1 agg.)	Artsakh	Yerevan
15:00 (UTC+4)	Jablan 25'; Artu.Yedigaryan 66', 76', 80'; Grigoryan 69'; Dashyan 90+1'	Report	Mirakyan (yellow card) 16'	Stadium: Alashkert Stadium; Referee: Henrik Nalbandian

== Statistics ==
As of match played 28 May 2018

=== Appearances and goals ===
No.	Pos	Nat	Player	Total		First League		Armenian Cup	
No.	Pos	Nat	Player	Apps	Goals	Apps	Goals	Apps	Goals
1	GK	(Russia) RUS	Samur Agamagomedov	11	0	11	0	0	0
2	DF	(Armenia) ARM	Aghavard Petrosyan	11	2	5+6	2	0	0
3	DF	(Armenia) ARM	Hamlet Asoyan	12	3	11+1	3	0	0
4	DF	(Armenia) ARM	Eric Nazaryan	11	1	11	1	0	0
5	DF	(Armenia) ARM	Gor Mkrtumyan	25	4	21+3	4	1	0
6	MF	(Armenia) ARM	Walter Poghosyan	8	3	2+6	3	0	0
7	MF	(Armenia) ARM	Karen Harutyunyan	26	3	24+1	3	1	0
8	FW	(Russia) RUS	Ramazan Isayev	11	5	5+6	5	0	0
9	FW	(Armenia) ARM	Grigor Aghekyan	26	19	21+4	18	1	1
10	MF	(Armenia) ARM	Artur Grigoryan	24	2	23	2	1	0
11	DF	(Armenia) ARM	Eduard Avagyan	16	4	11+5	4	0	0
12	DF	(Russia) RUS	Rostislav Golovach	21	0	17+2	0	2	0
14	MF	(Ukraine) UKR	Mykhaylo Babiy	10	6	0+10	6	0	0
15	DF	(Armenia) ARM	Vadim Hayriyan	7	0	0+6	0	1	0
16	MF	(Russia) RUS	Dmitry Dushin	10	1	5+5	1	0	0
17	MF	(Russia) RUS	Muslim Bammatgereev	7	1	5+2	1	0	0
18	MF	(Armenia) ARM	Tigran Simonyan	4	0	0+3	0	0+1	0
19	MF	(Armenia) ARM	Armo Adamyan	7	0	1+4	0	0+2	0
21	MF	(Armenia) ARM	Arsen Hovhannisyan	25	3	9+14	3	1+1	0
22	DF	(Armenia) ARM	Hakob Hambardzumyan	9	1	9	1	0	0
26	MF	(Armenia) ARM	Arsen Harutyunyan	2	0	0+1	0	0+1	0
33	MF	(Armenia) ARM	Emil Yeghiazaryan	11	5	11	5	0	0
77	MF	(Armenia) ARM	Rafael Ghazaryan	7	1	4+3	1	0	0
95	GK	(Armenia) ARM	Erik Meliksetyan	3	0	0+3	0	0	0
99	GK	(Armenia) ARM	Arman Hovhannisyan	6	0	1+5	0	0	0
Players away on loan:
Players who left Artsakh during the season:
1	GK	(Armenia) ARM	Albert Ohanyan	2	0	0+1	0	1	0
2	DF	(Armenia) ARM	Zhora Nazaryan	6	0	0+5	0	1	0
3	DF	(Armenia) ARM	Vazgen Yeranosyan	15	0	12+1	0	1+1	0
4	DF	(Armenia) ARM	Armen Durunts	13	0	5+6	0	2	0
6	MF	(Armenia) ARM	Vahan Adloyan	11	1	6+5	1	0	0
10	MF	(Armenia) ARM	Narek Gyozalyan	9	2	8+1	2	0	0
14	DF	(Armenia) ARM	Arthur Sahakyan	15	1	14	1	1	0
16	MF	(Armenia) ARM	Vahe Mirakyan	9	0	2+6	0	1	0
17	MF	(Armenia) ARM	Davit Babayan	15	1	13+1	1	1	0
22	MF	(Armenia) ARM	Karen Shakhkeldyan	9	0	2+6	0	1	0
33	DF	(Ukraine) UKR	Yegor Lugovyi	7	0	2+3	0	1+1	0
33	MF	(Armenia) ARM	David Asatryan	1	0	0+1	0	0	0
77	FW	(Armenia) ARM	Narek Ghassumyan	9	0	1+6	0	1+1	0
88	FW	(Ukraine) UKR	Viktor Martyan	8	2	0+7	2	1	0
88	DF	(Armenia) ARM	Davit Israelyan	1	0	0	0	1	0
95	GK	(Armenia) ARM	Grigor Makaryan	15	0	14	0	1	0

=== Goal scorers ===
Place	Position	Nation	Number	Name	First League	Armenian Cup	Total
1	FW	(Armenia)	9	Grigor Aghekyan	18	1	19
2	MF	(Ukraine)	14	Mykhaylo Babiy	6	0	6
3	MF	(Russia)	8	Ramazan Isayev	5	0	5
3	MF	(Armenia)	33	Emil Yeghiazaryan	5	0	5
5	MF	(Armenia)	11	Eduard Avagyan	4	0	4
5	DF	(Armenia)	5	Gor Mkrtumyan	4	0	4
5	MF	(Armenia)		Own goal	4	0	4
8	MF	(Armenia)	7	Karen Harutyunyan	3	0	3
8	MF	(Armenia)	21	Arsen Hovhannisyan	3	0	3
8	DF	(Armenia)	3	Hamlet Asoyan	3	0	3
8	MF	(Armenia)	18	Walter Poghosyan	3	0	3
8				Awarded	3	0	3
13	MF	(Armenia)	10	Narek Gyozalyan	2	0	2
13	MF	(Armenia)	10	Artur Grigoryan	2	0	2
13	FW	(Ukraine)	88	Viktor Martyan	2	0	2
13	DF	(Armenia)	2	Aghavard Petrosyan	2	0	2
17	MF	(Armenia)	17	Davit Babayan	1	0	1
17	DF	(Armenia)	14	Arthur Sahakyan	1	0	1
17	MF	(Armenia)	6	Vahan Adloyan	1	0	1
17	MF	(Armenia)	77	Rafael Ghazaryan	1	0	1
17	DF	(Russia)	16	Dmitry Dushin	1	0	1
17	MF	(Russia)	17	Muslim Bammatgereev	1	0	1
17	DF	(Armenia)	22	Hakob Hambardzumyan	1	0	1
17	DF	(Armenia)	4	Eric Nazaryan	1	0	1
				TOTALS	77	1	78

=== Clean sheets ===
Place	Position	Nation	Number	Name	First League	Armenian Cup	Total
1	GK	(Armenia)	95	Grigor Makaryan	7	0	7
1	GK	(Russia)	1	Samur Agamagomedov	7	0	7
				TOTALS	14	0	14

=== Disciplinary record ===
Number	Nation	Position	Name	First League		Armenian Cup		Total	
Number	Nation	Position	Name	Booked	Sent off (straight red)	Booked	Sent off (straight red)	Booked	Sent off (straight red)
2	(Armenia)	DF	Aghavard Petrosyan	1	0	0	0	1	0
4	(Armenia)	DF	Eric Nazaryan	2	0	0	0	2	0
5	(Armenia)	DF	Gor Mkrtumyan	6	0	0	0	6	0
7	(Armenia)	MF	Karen Harutyunyan	3	0	0	0	3	0
9	(Armenia)	FW	Grigor Aghekyan	3	0	0	0	3	0
11	(Armenia)	MF	Eduard Avagyan	1	0	0	0	1	0
12	(Russia)	DF	Rostislav Golovach	1	0	0	0	1	0
16	(Russia)	DF	Dmitry Dushin	2	0	0	0	2	0
33	(Armenia)	MF	Emil Yeghiazaryan	4	0	0	0	4	0
21	(Armenia)	MF	Arsen Hovhannisyan	2	0	0	0	2	0
22	(Armenia)	DF	Hakob Hambardzumyan	2	0	0	0	2	0
Players who left Artsakh during the season:
3	(Armenia)	DF	Vazgen Yeranosyan	1	0	0	0	1	0
4	(Armenia)	DF	Armen Durunts	1	0	0	0	1	0
6	(Armenia)	MF	Vahan Adloyan	1	0	0	0	1	0
10	(Armenia)	MF	Narek Gyozalyan	1	1	0	0	1	1
14	(Armenia)	DF	Arthur Sahakyan	1	0	0	0	1	0
16	(Armenia)	MF	Vahe Mirakyan	0	0	1	0	1	0
33	(Ukraine)	DF	Yegor Lugovyi	2	0	0	0	2	0
88	(Ukraine)	FW	Viktor Martyan	1	0	0	0	1	0
			TOTALS	35	1	1	0	36	1
