= 2017–18 FC Ararat-Moskva season =

Ararat-Moskva
2017–18 season
- Director: Poghos Galstyan
- Manager: Artak Oseyan
- Stadium: FFA Academy Stadium
- First League: 3rd
- Armenian Cup: Quarterfinal vs Gandzasar Kapan
- Top goalscorer: League: Armen Hovhannisyan (15); All: Armen Hovhannisyan (15)
- Highest home attendance: 400 vs Artsakh (11 September 2017)
- Lowest home attendance: 50 vs Gandzasar Kapan-2 (27 November 2017); 50 vs Erebuni (12 March 2018)
- Average home league attendance: 127 (21 May 2018)

The 2017–18 season was Ararat-Moskva's 1st season in existence, in which they finished Third in the First League, gaining promotion to the Armenian Premier League, whilst they were knocked out of the Armenian Cup by Gandzasar Kapan in the Quarter-finals.

== Season events ==
The club began the season under the name of Avan Academy, and featured predominately players from the Yerevan Football Academy and graduates from Pyunik, and managed by Artak Oseyan. At the beginning of 2018, the club was taken over by the Russian-Armenian businessman Samvel Karapetyan who renamed the football club as Ararat-Moskva. The club was reorganized as soon as FC Ararat Moscow in Russia was denied certificate for the next season.

== Squad ==
As of match played 21 May 2018

Number	Name	Nationality	Position	Date of birth (age)	Signed from	Signed in	Contract ends	Apps.	Goals
Goalkeepers
1	Vahe Muradyan	(Armenia)	GK	7 January 2000 (aged 18)	Youth team	2017		1	0
12	Nikos Melikyan	(Armenia)	GK	2 March 1999 (aged 19)	Atromitos	2017		25	0
23	Narek Voskanyan	(Armenia)	GK		Youth team	2017		10	0
Defenders
2	Derenik Sargsyan	(Armenia)	DF	13 October 1999 (aged 18)	Pyunik	2017		29	0
3	Lyova Gharibyan	(Armenia)	DF	28 January 1999 (aged 19)	Pyunik	2017		27	1
4	Albert Khachumyan	(Armenia)	DF	23 June 1999 (aged 18)	Pyunik	2017		26	4
5	Karen Hovhannisyan	(Armenia)	DF	18 January 2000 (aged 18)	Pyunik	2017		12	0
13	Gevorg Markosyan	(Armenia)	DF		Pyunik	2017		12	0
14	Arsen Sargsyan	(Armenia)	DF	19 July 2000 (aged 17)	Pyunik	2017		17	1
17	Arman Asilyan	(Armenia)	DF	15 April 1999 (aged 19)	Pyunik	2017		29	1
27	Levon Gevorgyan	(Armenia)	DF	24 October 1998 (aged 19)	Banants	2018		3	0
29	Harutyun Vardanyan	(Armenia)	DF		Youth team	2017		1	0
Midfielders
6	Norayr Grigoryan	(Armenia)	MF	20 October 1999 (aged 18)	Pyunik	2017		13	1
7	Vigen Karapetyan	(Armenia)	MF	26 April 1999 (aged 19)	Pyunik	2017		23	1
8	Mihran Petrosyan	(Armenia)	MF	19 September 1999 (aged 18)	Pyunik	2017		29	3
10	Armen Nahapetyan	(Armenia)	MF	24 July 1999 (aged 18)	Pyunik	2017		29	11
11	Zhirayr Shaghoyan	(Armenia)	MF	10 April 2001 (aged 17)	Pyunik	2017		19	7
15	Patvakan Avetisyan	(Armenia)	MF	24 August 2001 (aged 16)	Mika	2017		5	0
16	Samvel Harutyunyan	(Armenia)	MF	22 September 2002 (aged 15)	Youth team	2017		1	0
18	Erik Azizyan	(Armenia)	MF	4 March 2000 (aged 18)	Pyunik	2017		25	4
20	Samvel Spertsyan	(Armenia)	MF	24 May 1998 (aged 19)	Pyunik	2018		11	2
21	Mikhail Muradyan	(Armenia)	MF	4 November 1999 (aged 18)	Pyunik	2017		29	7
25	Davit Nalbandyan	(Armenia)	MF	9 August 1999 (aged 18)	Pyunik	2017		26	0
26	Gevorg Mkhitaryan	(Armenia)	MF	7 April 2000 (aged 18)	Youth team	2017		2	0
Forwards
9	Armen Hovhannisyan	(Armenia)	FW	7 March 2000 (aged 18)	Pyunik	2018		25	15
22	Aram Kolozyan	(Armenia)	FW	21 May 2001 (aged 17)	Pyunik	2018		18	2
24	Arman Badalyan	(Armenia)	FW		Youth team	2017		1	0
Away on loan
Left during the season
2	Hrachya Geghamyan	(Armenia)	DF	2 December 1999 (aged 18)	loan from Banants	2017		14	0
9	Rafik Melikyan	(Armenia)	FW	31 March 1999 (aged 19)	Pyunik	2017		5	0
11	Hovhannes Harutyunyan	(Armenia)	MF	25 May 1999 (aged 18)	Pyunik	2017		12	5

== Transfers ==
=== In ===
Date	Position	Nationality	Name	From	Fee	Ref.
1 July 2017	DF	(Armenia)	Gevorg Markosyan	Pyunik	Undisclosed	
1 July 2017	MF	(Armenia)	Patvakan Avetisyan	Mika	Undisclosed	
1 July 2017	MF	(Armenia)	Mikhail Muradyan	Pyunik	Undisclosed	
1 July 2017	MF	(Armenia)	Davit Nalbandyan	Pyunik	Undisclosed	
1 July 2017	FW	(Armenia)	Aram Kolozyan	Pyunik	Undisclosed	
1 July 2017	FW	(Armenia)	Rafik Melikyan	Pyunik	Undisclosed	
1 August 2017	GK	(Armenia)	Nikos Melikyan	Atromitos	Undisclosed	
1 August 2017	DF	(Armenia)	Arman Asilyan	Pyunik	Undisclosed	
1 August 2017	DF	(Armenia)	Lyova Gharibyan	Pyunik	Undisclosed	
1 August 2017	DF	(Armenia)	Karen Hovhannisyan	Pyunik	Undisclosed	
1 August 2017	DF	(Armenia)	Albert Khachumyan	Pyunik	Undisclosed	
1 August 2017	DF	(Armenia)	Arsen Sargsyan	Pyunik	Undisclosed	
1 August 2017	DF	(Armenia)	Derenik Sargsyan	Pyunik	Undisclosed	
1 August 2017	MF	(Armenia)	Erik Azizyan	Pyunik	Undisclosed	
1 August 2017	MF	(Armenia)	Norayr Grigoryan	Pyunik	Undisclosed	
1 August 2017	MF	(Armenia)	Hovhannes Harutyunyan	Pyunik	Undisclosed	
1 August 2017	MF	(Armenia)	Vigen Karapetyan	Pyunik	Undisclosed	
1 August 2017	MF	(Armenia)	Armen Nahapetyan	Pyunik	Undisclosed	
1 August 2017	MF	(Armenia)	Mihran Petrosyan	Pyunik	Undisclosed	
1 August 2017	MF	(Armenia)	Zhirayr Shaghoyan	Pyunik	Undisclosed	
1 August 2017	FW	(Armenia)	Armen Hovhannisyan	Pyunik	Undisclosed	
21 January 2018	DF	(Armenia)	Levon Gevorgyan	Banants	Undisclosed	
1 February 2018	MF	(Armenia)	Samvel Spertsyan	Pyunik	Undisclosed	

=== Loans in ===
Date from	Position	Nationality	Name	From	Date to	Ref.
1 August 2017	DF	(Armenia)	Hrachya Geghamyan	Bananats	31 December 2017	

=== Out ===
Date	Position	Nationality	Name	To	Fee	Ref.
1 March 2018	MF	(Armenia)	Hovhannes Harutyunyan	Zemplín Michalovce	Undisclosed	

=== Released ===
Date	Position	Nationality	Name	Joined	Date
31 December 2017	FW	(Armenia)	Rafik Melikyan		

== Competitions ==
=== Overall record ===
Competition	First match	Last match	Starting round	Final position	Record							
Competition	First match	Last match	Starting round	Final position	Pld	W	D	L	GF	GA	GD	Win %
First League	14 August 2017	21 May 2018	Matchday 1	3rd	27	14	4	9	65	41	+24	51.85
Armenian Cup	14 September 2017	11 October 2017	Quarterfinal	Quarterfinal	2	0	0	2	0	7	−7	0.00
Total					29	14	4	11	65	48	+17	48.28

Last updated: 21 May 2018
Source: Competitions

=== First League ===
==== Results summary ====
Overall								Home						Away					
Pld	W	D	L	GF	GA	GD	Pts	W	D	L	GF	GA	GD	W	D	L	GF	GA	GD
27	14	4	9	65	41	+24	46	7	1	6	37	19	+18	7	3	3	28	22	+6

Last updated: 21 May 2018.
Source: See Results

==== Results ====
14 August 2017 2	Shirak-2	2 – 2	Avan Academy	Gyumri
18:00 (UTC+4)	M.Safaryan 23'; S.Gevorgyan (yellow card) 41'; M.Mkhitaryan 60'; R.Mkrtchyan (yellow card) 86'	Report	Harutyunyan 74'; A.Nahapetyan 89'	Stadium: Football Academy; Attendance: 100; Referee: Ashot Ghaltakchyan

21 August 2017 3	Avan Academy	1 – 1	Alashkert-2	Yerevan
17:00 (UTC+4)	A.Hovhannisyan 24' (yellow card) 35'; D.Nalbandyan (yellow card) 42'; Harutyunyan (yellow card) 49'; A.Nahapetyan (yellow card) 69'	Report	R.Grigoryan (yellow card) 25'; N.Minasyan (yellow card) 38'; A.Hovsepyan (yellow card) 45'; K.Topalyan (yellow card) 75'; M.Sahakyan 90'; A.Hambardzumyan (yellow card) 90+2'	Stadium: FFA Academy Stadium; Attendance: 100; Referee: Erik Galstyan

28 August 2017 4	Gandzasar Kapan-2	2 – 3	Avan Academy	Kapan
17:00 (UTC+4)	T.Ivanyan 8' (pen.); A.Karapetyan (yellow card) 26'; A.Adamyan 50'	Report	M.Muradyan 2'; E.Azizyan 20', 63'; A.Hovhannisyan (yellow card) 45'; R.Melikyan (yellow card) 90+3'	Stadium: Gandzasar Kapan Training Centre; Attendance: 0 Referee: Gevorg Eghoyan

3 September 2017 1	Avan Academy	1 – 5	Lori	Yerevan
17:00 (UTC+4)	A.Nahapetyan 24'; L.Gharibyan (yellow card) 32'; H.Geghamyan (red card) 58'	Report	V.Avetisyan 3', 72'; E.Mkrtchyan 33' (pen.); D.Aslanyan (yellow card) 58'; E.Gharibyan 69'; D.Aslanyan 79'	Stadium: FFA Academy Stadium; Attendance: 200; Referee: Shahen Aghayan

11 September 2017 5	Avan Academy	1 – 2	Artsakh	Yerevan
16:00 (UTC+4)	A.Hovhannisyan 81'; Harutyunyan (yellow card) 89'	Report	Aghekyan 62', 67'	Stadium: FFA Academy Stadium; Attendance: 400; Referee: Arman Alaberkyan

18 September 2017 6	Avan Academy	2 – 0	Pyunik-2	Yerevan
16:00 (UTC+4)	A.Hovhannisyan 11' (yellow card) 30'; Shaghoyan 72'	Report	E.Ghukasyan (yellow card) 65'	Stadium: FFA Academy Stadium; Attendance: 100; Referee: Ashot Ghaltakchyan

3 October 2017 7	Erebuni	0 – 3	Avan Academy	Yerevan
16:00 (UTC+4)	M. Atanesyan (yellow card) 58'	Report	A. Asilyan 42'; M. Petrosyan 51'; A. Khachumyan (yellow card) 78'; G. Markosyan (yellow card) 83'; A. Nahapetyan 88'	Stadium: Hmayak Khachatryan Stadium; Attendance: 60; Referee: Henrik Nalbandyan

16 October 2017 8	Avan Academy	0 – 2	Banants-2	Yerevan
15:00 (UTC+4)	D. Nalbandyan (yellow card) 33'; A. Khachumyan (yellow card) 69'; M. Muradyan (yellow card) 85'	Report	E. Yeghiazaryan 21' (pen.); H.Sargsyan (yellow card) 35'; A.Portugalyan 52'	Stadium: FFA Academy Stadium; Attendance: 100; Referee: Erik Galstyan

23 October 2017 9	Ararat Yerevan-2	0 – 1	Avan Academy	Dzoraghbyur
15:00 (UTC+4)	E. Nazaryan (yellow card) 36'; R. Avagyan (yellow card) 38'; M. Arustamyan (yellow card) 90+2'	Report	H. Geghamyan (yellow card) 36'; A. Asilyan (yellow card) 57'; M. Petrosyan 90'	Stadium: Dzoraghbyur Training Centre; Attendance: 50; Referee: Henrik Nalbandyan

20 November 2017 12	Alashkert-2	3 – 3	Avan Academy	Yerevan
14:00 (UTC+4)	V. Zoulghadr 21'; A.Hambardzumyan (yellow card) 37'; A. Jindoyan 48'; R. Grigoryan 82'; N. Simonyan (yellow card) 90+2'	Report	A. Khachumyan 9'; A. Hovhannisyan 13'; D. Nalbandyan (yellow card) 31'; Harutyunyan 58'	Stadium: Alashkert Stadium; Attendance: 100; Referee: Artur Safaryan

23 November 2017 10	Lori	4 – 1	Avan Academy	Vanadzor
14:00 (UTC+4)	V.Avetisyan 17', 38', 61'; E.Mkrtchyan 73'; Y.Kouassi (yellow card) 84'	Report	A.Nahapetyan 56'	Stadium: Vanadzor Football Academy; Attendance: 100; Referee: Shahen Aghayan

27 November 2017 13	Avan Academy	5 – 0	Gandzasar Kapan-2	Yerevan
14:00 (UTC+4)	Shaghoyan 17', 79'; D.Nalbandyan (yellow card) 33'; Harutyunyan 47', 51'; E.Azizyan 49'; A.Kolozyan (yellow card) 90+1'	Report		Stadium: FFA Academy Stadium; Attendance: 50; Referee: Henrik Nalbandyan

30 November 2017 11	Avan Academy	6 – 0	Shirak-2	Yerevan
14:00 (UTC+4)	A.Khachumyan 13'; M.Muradyan 16' (yellow card) 68'; A.Nahapetyan 34'; Harutyunyan 55'; Shaghoyan 79'; A.Kolozyan 83'	Report	S.Avetisyan (yellow card) 66'; A.Vardanyan (yellow card) 90+1'	Stadium: FFA Academy Stadium; Attendance: 100; Referee: Vardan Manukyan

4 December 2017 14	Artsakh	1 – 2	Avan Academy	Ashtarak
14:00 (UTC+4)	N.Gyozalyan 26'	Report	A.Hovhannisyan 61', 89'; H.Geghamyan (yellow card) 78'; M.Petrosyan (yellow card) 87'	Stadium: Kasakhi Marzik Stadium; Attendance: 150; Referee: Ashot Ghaltakchyan

5 March 2018 15	Pyunik-2	1 – 2	Ararat-Moskva	Yerevan
14:00 (UTC+4)	M.Petrosyan 26' (o.g.) E.Movsisyan (yellow card) 42'; A.Karapetyan (yellow card) 64'	Report	A.Khachumyan 11' (yellow card) 86'; A.Hovhannisyan 18'; L.Gharibyan (yellow card) 62'; N.Melikyan (yellow card) 84'	Stadium: Pyunik Stadium; Attendance: 100; Referee: Erik Galstyan

12 March 2018 16	Ararat-Moskva	8 – 0	Erebuni	Yerevan
14:00 (UTC+4)	M.Muradyan 25', 44', 62'; A.Nahapetyan 27'; E.Azizyan 31'; A.Hovhannisyan 36'; M.Petrosyan 74'; N.Grigoryan 89'	Report	A.Ayvazyan (yellow card) 51'	Stadium: FFA Academy Stadium; Attendance: 50; Referee: Vardan Manukyan

19 March 2018 17	Banants-2	3 – 1	Ararat-Moskva	Yerevan
14:00 (UTC+4)	K.Melkonyan 24'; Fagner 35'; N.Grigoryan 74'	Report	A.Hovhannisyan 36' (yellow card) 54'	Stadium: Banants Training Centre; Attendance: 300; Referee: Henrik Nalbandyan

26 March 2018 18	Ararat-Moskva	3 – 0	Ararat Yerevan-2	Yerevan
14:00 (UTC+4)	L.Gharibyan 31' (yellow card) 44'; V.Karapetyan (yellow card) 32'; D.Nalbandyan (yellow card) 59'; A.Nahapetyan 71'; S.Spertsyan (yellow card) 74'; A.Sargsyan 82'	Report	A.Stepanyan (yellow card) 77'; A.Poghosyan (yellow card) 79'	Stadium: FFA Academy Stadium; Attendance: 100; Referee: Ashot Ghaltakchyan

3 April 2018 19	Ararat-Moskva	0 – 3	Lori	Yerevan
15:00 (UTC+4)	A.Nahapetyan (yellow card) 48'; A.Khachumyan (yellow card) 64'	Report	A.Mensah (yellow card) 27' (goal) 30'; F.Ibrahim (yellow card) 77'	Stadium: FFA Academy Stadium; Attendance: 100; Referee: Gevorg Eghoyan
Note: Match awarded 3-0 to Lori, originally finished 1-0 to Lori.

9 April 2018 20	Shirak-2	1 – 0	Ararat-Moskva	Gyumri
16:00 (UTC+4)	V.Shakhbazyan (yellow card) 24'; I.Atayev (yellow card) 41'; A.Mirzakhanyan (yellow card) 87'; A.Mikaelyan 90'	Report	A.Khachumyan (yellow card) 58'	Stadium: Football Academy; Attendance: 150; Referee: Artur Tavakalyan

9 April 2018 21	Ararat-Moskva	3 – 2	Alashkert-2	Yerevan
16:00 (UTC+4)	A.Nahapetyan 52'; S.Spertsyan 76'; Shaghoyan 82'	Report	A.Hambardzumyan 7'; H.Hakobkokhyan (yellow card) 24'; R.Grigoryan (yellow card) 44'; G.Khachatryan 87'; R.Yeghiazaryan (yellow card) 89'	Stadium: FFA Academy Stadium; Attendance: 50; Referee: Erik Galstyan

23 April 2018 22	Gandzasar Kapan-2	2 – 4	Ararat-Moskva	Kapan
16:00 (UTC+4)	M.Harutyunyan 58', 74'	Report	M.Muradyan 4', 47' (yellow card) 71'; A.Nahapetyan 22'; E.Azizyan (yellow card) 45'; L.Gharibyan (yellow card) 54'; A.Hovhannisyan 89'	Stadium: Gandzasar Kapan Training Centre; Attendance: 50; Referee: Henrik Nalbandyan

30 April 2018 23	Ararat-Moskva	0 – 2	Artsakh	Yerevan
17:00 (UTC+4)	D.Sargsyan (yellow card) 14'; A.Khachumyan (yellow card) 69'	Report	H.Asoyan 15'; E.Avagyan (yellow card) 81' (goal) 90'	Stadium: FFA Academy Stadium; Attendance: 100; Referee: Vardan Manukyan

7 May 2018 24	Ararat-Moskva	0 – 1	Pyunik-2	Yerevan
17:00 (UTC+4)	A.Kolozyan (yellow card) 40'	Report	V.Begoyan 65'; D.Grigoryan (yellow card) 86'	Stadium: FFA Academy Stadium; Attendance: 100; Referee: Gevorg Eghoyan

14 May 2018 25	Erebuni	2 – 2	Ararat-Moskva	Yerevan
17:00 (UTC+4)	S.Tadevosyan 36' (pen.), 79'	Report	D.Nalbandyan (yellow card) 4'; A.Nahapetyan 53'; S.Spertsyan 82' (yellow card) 88'	Stadium: Hmayak Khachatryan Stadium; Attendance: 150; Referee: Ashot Ghaltakchyan

17 May 2018 27	Ararat Yerevan-2	1 – 4	Ararat-Moskva	Dzoraghbyur
17:00 (UTC+4)	N.Papoyan 85'	Report	A.Hovhannisyan 6', 68'; A.Khachumyan 31'; Shaghoyan 64'	Stadium: Dzoraghbyur Training Centre; Attendance: 20; Referee: Erik Galstyan

21 May 2018 26	Ararat-Moskva	7 – 1	Banants-2	Yerevan
17:00 (UTC+4)	A.Hovhannisyan 6', 30', 64'; A.Nahapetyan 7'; E.Azizyan (yellow card) 45'; Shaghoyan 49'; A.Khachumyan (yellow card) 58'; D.Nalbandyan (yellow card) 71'; K.Hovhannisyan (yellow card) 80'; A.Kolozyan 84'; V.Karapetyan 87'	Report	A.Adamyan 56'; E.Gharibyan (yellow card) 90+1'	Stadium: FFA Academy Stadium; Attendance: 150; Referee: Artur Safaryan

==== Table ====
Pos	Team	Pld	W	D	L	GF	GA	GD	Pts	Promotion
1	Lori (C, P)	27	22	3	2	74	16	+58	69	Promotion to the Premier League
2	Artsakh (P)	27	21	2	4	77	16	+61	65	Promotion to the Premier League
3	Ararat-Moskva (P)	27	14	4	9	65	41	+24	46	Promotion to the Premier League
4	Banants-2	27	14	3	10	45	42	+3	45	Ineligible for promotion
5	Pyunik-2	27	13	1	13	49	44	+5	40	Ineligible for promotion
6	Alashkert-2	27	12	4	11	48	42	+6	40	Ineligible for promotion
7	Ararat Yerevan-2	27	7	4	16	36	55	−19	25	Ineligible for promotion
8	Erebuni	27	6	4	17	33	91	−58	22	
9	Gandzasar Kapan-2	27	6	2	19	31	74	−43	20	Ineligible for promotion
10	Shirak-2	27	5	3	19	22	59	−37	18	Ineligible for promotion

Source: Football Federation of Armenia (in Armenian)
Rules for classification: 1) Points; 2) Play-off (only if deciding champion); 3) Matches won; 4) Head-to-head points; 5) Head-to-head matches won; 6) Head-to-head goal difference; 7) Head-to-head goals scored; 8) Head-to-head away goals scored; 9) Goal difference; 10) Goals scored.
(C) Champions; (P) Promoted

=== Armenian Cup ===
14 September 2017 Quarterfinal 1st leg	Gandzasar Kapan	3 – 0	Avan Academy	Yerevan
19:00 (UTC+4)	S.Shahinyan 62'; Junior 78'; G.Nranyan 87'	Report	K.Hovhannisyan (yellow card) 34'; A.Asilyan (yellow card) 89'	Stadium: Vazgen Sargsyan Republican Stadium; Attendance: 200; Referee: Henrik Nalbandyan

11 October 2017 Quarterfinal 2nd leg	Avan Academy	0 – 4 (0 – 7 agg.)	Gandzasar Kapan	Yerevan
15:00 (UTC+4)	H.Geghamyan (yellow card) 59'; A.Khachumyan (yellow card) 77'	Report	G.Nranyan 1', 55'; A.Adamyan 44'; Yashin 74'	Stadium: FFA Academy Stadium; Attendance: 200; Referee: Ashot Ghaltakchyan

== Statistics ==
As of match played 30 May 2019

=== Appearances and goals ===
No.	Pos	Nat	Player	Total		First League		Armenian Cup	
No.	Pos	Nat	Player	Apps	Goals	Apps	Goals	Apps	Goals
1	GK	(Armenia) ARM	Vahe Muradyan	1	0	0+1	0	0	0
2	DF	(Armenia) ARM	Derenik Sargsyan	29	0	20+7	0	2	0
3	DF	(Armenia) ARM	Lyova Gharibyan	27	1	25+1	1	1	0
4	DF	(Armenia) ARM	Albert Khachumyan	26	4	23+1	4	2	0
5	DF	(Armenia) ARM	Karen Hovhannisyan	12	0	2+9	0	1	0
6	MF	(Armenia) ARM	Norayr Grigoryan	13	1	0+13	1	0	0
7	MF	(Armenia) ARM	Vigen Karapetyan	23	1	14+8	1	1	0
8	MF	(Armenia) ARM	Mihran Petrosyan	29	3	7+20	3	0+2	0
9	FW	(Armenia) ARM	Armen Hovhannisyan	25	15	21+2	15	2	0
10	MF	(Armenia) ARM	Armen Nahapetyan	29	11	25+2	11	2	0
11	MF	(Armenia) ARM	Zhirayr Shaghoyan	19	7	10+9	7	0	0
12	GK	(Armenia) ARM	Nikos Melikyan	25	0	23	0	2	0
13	DF	(Armenia) ARM	Gevorg Markosyan	12	0	0+10	0	0+2	0
14	DF	(Armenia) ARM	Arsen Sargsyan	17	1	5+10	1	0+2	0
15	MF	(Armenia) ARM	Patvakan Avetisyan	5	0	0+5	0	0	0
16	MF	(Armenia) ARM	Samvel Harutyunyan	1	0	0+1	0	0	0
17	DF	(Armenia) ARM	Arman Asilyan	29	1	27	1	2	0
18	MF	(Armenia) ARM	Erik Azizyan	25	4	18+5	4	2	0
20	MF	(Armenia) ARM	Samvel Spertsyan	11	2	11	2	0	0
21	MF	(Armenia) ARM	Mikhail Muradyan	29	7	14+13	7	0+2	0
22	FW	(Armenia) ARM	Aram Kolozyan	18	2	3+15	2	0	0
23	GK	(Armenia) ARM	Narek Voskanyan	10	0	4+6	0	0	0
24	FW	(Armenia) ARM	Arman Badalyan	1	0	0+1	0	0	0
25	MF	(Armenia) ARM	Davit Nalbandyan	26	0	19+5	0	2	0
26	MF	(Armenia) ARM	Gevorg Mkhitaryan	2	0	0+2	0	0	0
27	DF	(Armenia) ARM	Levon Gevorgyan	3	0	1+2	0	0	0
29	DF	(Armenia) ARM	Harutyun Vardanyan	1	0	1	0	0	0
Players away on loan:
Players who left Ararat-Moskva during the season:
2	DF	(Armenia) ARM	Hrachya Geghamyan	14	0	12	0	2	0
9	FW	(Armenia) ARM	Rafik Melikyan	5	0	1+4	0	0	0
11	MF	(Armenia) ARM	Hovhannes Harutyunyan	12	5	9+2	5	1	0

=== Goal scorers ===
Place	Position	Nation	Number	Name	First League	Armenian Cup	Total
1	FW	(Armenia)	9	Armen Hovhannisyan	15	0	15
2	MF	(Armenia)	10	Armen Nahapetyan	11	0	11
3	MF	(Armenia)	21	Mikhail Muradyan	7	0	7
3	MF	(Armenia)	11	Zhirayr Shaghoyan	7	0	7
5	MF	(Armenia)	11	Hovhannes Harutyunyan	5	0	5
6	MF	(Armenia)	18	Erik Azizyan	4	0	4
6	DF	(Armenia)	4	Albert Khachumyan	4	0	4
8	MF	(Armenia)	8	Mihran Petrosyan	3	0	3
9	FW	(Armenia)	18	Aram Kolozyan	2	0	2
9	MF	(Armenia)	20	Samvel Spertsyan	2	0	2
11	DF	(Armenia)	17	Arman Asilyan	1	0	1
11	MF	(Armenia)	6	Norayr Grigoryan	1	0	1
11	DF	(Armenia)	3	Lyova Gharibyan	1	0	1
11	DF	(Armenia)	14	Arsen Sargsyan	1	0	1
11	MF	(Armenia)	7	Vigen Karapetyan	1	0	1
				TOTALS	65	0	65

=== Clean sheets ===
Place	Position	Nation	Number	Name	First League	Armenian Cup	Total
1	GK	(Armenia)	12	Nikos Melikyan	7	0	7
				TOTALS	7	0	7

=== Disciplinary record ===
Number	Nation	Position	Name	First League		Armenian Cup		Total	
Number	Nation	Position	Name	Booked	Sent off (straight red)	Booked	Sent off (straight red)	Booked	Sent off (straight red)
2	(Armenia)	DF	Derenik Sargsyan	1	0	0	0	1	0
3	(Armenia)	DF	Lyova Gharibyan	4	0	0	0	4	0
4	(Armenia)	DF	Albert Khachumyan	7	0	1	0	8	0
5	(Armenia)	DF	Karen Hovhannisyan	1	0	1	0	2	0
7	(Armenia)	MF	Vigen Karapetyan	1	0	0	0	1	0
8	(Armenia)	MF	Mihran Petrosyan	1	0	0	0	1	0
9	(Armenia)	FW	Armen Hovhannisyan	4	0	0	0	4	0
10	(Armenia)	MF	Armen Nahapetyan	2	0	0	0	2	0
12	(Armenia)	GK	Nikos Melikyan	1	0	0	0	1	0
13	(Armenia)	DF	Gevorg Markosyan	1	0	0	0	1	0
17	(Armenia)	DF	Arman Asilyan	1	0	1	0	2	0
18	(Armenia)	MF	Erik Azizyan	2	0	0	0	2	0
20	(Armenia)	MF	Samvel Spertsyan	2	0	0	0	2	0
21	(Armenia)	MF	Mikhail Muradyan	3	0	0	0	3	0
22	(Armenia)	FW	Aram Kolozyan	2	0	0	0	2	0
25	(Armenia)	MF	Davit Nalbandyan	7	0	0	0	7	0
Players who left Ararat-Moskva during the season:
2	(Armenia)	DF	Hrachya Geghamyan	2	1	1	0	3	1
9	(Armenia)	FW	Rafik Melikyan	1	0	0	0	1	0
11	(Armenia)	MF	Hovhannes Harutyunyan	2	0	0	0	2	0
			TOTALS	45	1	4	0	49	1
