= 2018–19 Armenian First League =

Armenian First League
- Season: 2018–19
- Dates: 6 August 2018 – 13 June 2019
- Champions: Junior Sevan
- Promoted: Yerevan
- Biggest home win: Alashkert-2 8–0 Ararat Yerevan-2 (2 October 2018); Gandzasar-2 8–0 Erebuni (8 December 2018)
- Biggest away win: Ararat Yerevan-2 0-10 Yerevan (27 September 2018)
- Highest scoring: Ararat Yerevan-2 0-10 Yerevan (27 September 2018)
- All statistics correct as of 8 December 2018 (Note: Yerevan vs FC Lokomotiv matchday 11 fixture, scheduled on 21 October 2018, was not played and Lokomotiv was awarded a technical 0-3 win.).

The 2018–19 Armenian First League season was the 27th since its establishment. The season was launched on August 6, 2018, and concluded on June 13, 2019. Junior Sevan were reigned as champions, however, they did not gain promotion to the 2019–20 Armenian Premier League, due to not meeting the requirements of the Football Federation of Armenia to take part at the Armenian Premier League competition. Instead, runners-up Yerevan gained promotion, as they met the above-mentioned requirements.

== Team changes ==
5 new teams have joined the 2018–19 Armenian First League season:

- FC Yerevan from Yerevan, existed between 1995 and 1999, re-founded in 2018.
- FC Lokomotiv Yerevan from Yerevan, existed between 2002 and 2005, re-founded in 2018.
- Junior Sevan FC from Sevan, a newly-founded club in 2018.
- Banants-3 from Yerevan, reformed in 2018 as the 3rd team of FC Banants.
- Ararat-Armenia-2 from Yerevan, formed in 2018 as the reserve team of FC Ararat-Armenia.

Promoted to 2018–19 Armenian Premier League:

- Lori FC as 2017–18 Armenian First League champions.
- Artsakh FC as 2017–18 Armenian First League runners-up.
- FC Ararat-Armenia as 2017–18 Armenian First League 3rd-place winners

== Summary ==
A total of 12 clubs have entered the competition with only 4 clubs -Erebuni, Lokomotiv Yerevan, Junior Sevan and Yerevan- being eligible for promotion, while the rest 8 teams were the reserve teams of clubs from the Armenian Premier League.

On 28 February 2019, the FFA suspended the rights of Erebuni SC to continue competing in the second part of the 2018-19 Armenian First League and the club was expelled from the competition, plus a fine of AMD 500,000. Their matches of the second part of the season were given to their opponents by 0–3.

Although Junior Sevan were reigned as champions, they did not gain promotion to the 2019–20 Armenian Premier League, due to not meeting the requirements of the Football Federation of Armenia to take part at the Armenian Premier League competition. Instead, runners-up Yerevan gained promotion, as they met the requirements.

== Stadiums and locations ==
12 teams will take part in this season's competition, of which only 4 teams -Yerevan, FC Lokomotiv Yerevan, Junior Sevan, and ~~Erebuni~~- are eligible to get the promotion right to the 2019–20 Armenian Premier League by the end of the competition. The remaining 8 teams are the reserve teams of the football clubs currently participating in the Armenian Premier League competition.

Locations of the 2018–19 Armenian Premier League teams

Club	Location	Stadium	Capacity
~~Erebuni~~	~~Yerevan (Erebuni)~~	~~Hmayak Khachatryan Stadium~~	~~544~~
Junior Sevan	Dzoraghbyur (Kotayk)	Dzoraghbyur Training Centre^{1}	n/a
Lokomotiv Yerevan	Yerevan (Shengavit)	Mika Stadium	7,250
Yerevan	Vagharshapat	Vagharshapat Football Academy^{2}	n/a
Alashkert-2	Dzoraghbyur; Ashtarak	Dzoraghbyur Training Centre; Kasakhi Marzik Stadium	n/a 3,600
Ararat-2	Dzoraghbyur (Kotayk)	Dzoraghbyur Training Centre	n/a
Ararat-Armenia-2	Yerevan (Avan)	Football Academy Stadium	1,428
Banants-2	Yerevan (Malatia-Sebastia)	Banants Training Centre pitch#3	600
Banants-3	Yerevan (Malatia-Sebastia)	Banants Training Centre pitch#3	600
Gandzasar-2	Kapan	Gandzasar Training Centre	n/a
Pyunik-2	Yerevan (Kentron)	Pyunik Stadium	780
Shirak-2	Gyumri	Gyumri City Stadium	2,844

- ^{1}Junior Sevan will play at the Dzoraghbyur Training Centre, Dzoraghbyur, due to the ongoing construction of their new home venue Sevan Football Stadium, Sevan.
- ^{2}Yerevan will play at the Vagharshapat Football Academy, Vagharshapat, instead of their original venue Yerevan Football Academy Stadium, Yerevan.

=== Personnel and sponsorship ===
Team	President	Manager	Captain	Kit manufacturer	Shirt sponsor
~~Erebuni~~	(Armenia) Tigran Ayvazyan	(Armenia) Sevada Arzumanyan (matchday 1 to 18)	(Armenia) Sos Tadevosyan	Joma	
Junior Sevan	(Armenia) Hayk Grigoryan	(Belarus) Syarhey Herasimets	(Armenia) Gor Martirosyan	2K Sport	DI Group^{1}
Lokomotiv Yerevan	(Armenia) Hrachik Kananyan	(Armenia) Vahe Gevorgyan (matchday 1 to 18) (Ukraine) Anatoliy Piskovets (matchday 19 & onwards)	(Armenia) Arman Zeinalyan^{2}	Givova	
Yerevan	(Armenia) Karen Harutyunyan	(Armenia) Samvel Sargsyan	(Russia) Yevgeni Skoblikov	Nike	
Alashkert-2	(Armenia) Bagrat Navoyan	(Armenia) Sergey Erzrumyan	(Armenia) Artashes Arakelyan	Joma	Bagratour
Ararat-Armenia-2	(Armenia) Poghos Galstyan	(Armenia) Tigran Petrosyants	(Armenia) Albert Khachumyan	Joma	Tashir Group
Ararat Yerevan-2	(Armenia) (Belgium) Hiraç Yagan (until Sept. 2018) (Armenia) (Switzerland) Hrach Kaprielian (from Oct. 2018)	(Armenia) Georgi Andriasyan (matchday 1 to 18) (Armenia) Albert Safaryan (matchday 19 & onwards)	(Armenia) Sergey Mkrtchyan	Jako	
Banants-2	(Armenia) Hrach Aghabekian	(Armenia) Aram Hakobyan	(Armenia) Erik Vardanyan	Adidas	
Banants-3	(Armenia) Hrach Aghabekian	(Armenia) Tigran Arakelyan	(Armenia) Mikayel Mirzoyan	Adidas	
Gandzasar-2	(Armenia) Garnik Aghababian	(Armenia) Ashot Manucharyan	(Armenia) Tigran Ivanyan	Adidas	ZCMC
Pyunik-2	(Armenia) (Russia) Artur Soghomonyan	(Armenia) Albert Sarkisyan	(Armenia) Vigen Begoyan	Nike	Gold's Gym
Shirak-2	(Armenia) Arman Sahakyan	(Armenia) Tigran Davtyan	(Armenia) Artur Amiryan	Adidas	

1. On the back of the shirt.
2. Left the team at the end of the 1st half of the season (after matchday 18).

== League table ==
Pos	Team	Pld	W	D	L	GF	GA	GD	Pts	Promotion
1	Junior Sevan (C)	33	25	6	2	90	26	+64	81	
2	Yerevan (P)	33	22	4	7	112	46	+66	70	Promotion to the Premier League
3	Banants-2	33	21	7	5	65	31	+34	70	
4	Ararat-Armenia-2	33	18	7	8	70	40	+30	61	
5	Alashkert-2	33	15	10	8	63	39	+24	55	
6	Lokomotiv Yerevan	33	16	7	10	61	37	+24	55	
7	Pyunik-2	33	11	7	15	47	56	−9	40	
8	Shirak-2	33	11	4	18	38	56	−18	37	
9	Banants-3	33	9	6	18	38	57	−19	33	
10	Gandzasar Kapan-2	33	7	6	20	43	94	−51	27	
11	Ararat Yerevan-2	33	6	7	20	40	94	−54	25	
12	Erebuni	33	1	1	31	12	103	−91	4	

Updated to match(es) played on unknown. Source: Football Federation of Armenia (in English)
Rules for classification: 1) Points; 2) Play-off (only if deciding champion); 3) Matches won; 4) Head-to-head points; 5) Head-to-head matches won; 6) Head-to-head goal difference; 7) Head-to-head goals scored; 8) Head-to-head away goals scored; 9) Goal difference; 10) Goals scored.
(C) Champions; (P) Promoted

== Season statistics ==
=== Top scorers ===
As of match played 13 June 2019

Rank	Player	Club	Goals
1	(Russia) Stanislav Yefimov	Yerevan	46
2	(Russia) Ivan Latishev	Yerevan	17
2	(Armenia) Mher Harutyunyan	Gandzasar-2	17
2	(Armenia) Karapet Manukyan	Lokomotiv Yerevan	17
5	(Armenia) Erik Petrosyan	Banants-2	16
6	(Russia) Sultan Aksanov	Junior Sevan	15
7	(Armenia) Akhmed Jindoyan	Alashkert-2	14
8	(Armenia) Aram Kolozyan	Ararat-Armenia-2	12
9	(Armenia) Vardan Bakalyan	Ararat-Armenia-2	11
9	(Armenia) Sargis Metoyan	Ararat Yerevan-2	11
9	(Armenia) Mikayel Mirzoyan	Banants-3	11
