= List of FC Noah records and statistics =

Armenian football club statistics

Football Club Noah is an Armenian professional football club based in Abovyan. The club was formed in 2017 as FC Artsakh before changing their name to FC Noah at the beginning of 2019. This article encompasses the major records set by the club and their players in the Armenian Premier League, Armenian Cup and European competitions. The player records section includes details of the players who have played for the club in first-team competitions.

== Players ==
As of match played 7 November 2026

The list is includes all players who have joined and played for the club since its inception in 2017.

Academy graduate
Current Noah player
Current Noah player and academy graduate
Played for Noah on loan

=== 100 or more appearances ===
	Name	Years	League apps	League goals	Cup apps	Cup goals	Super Cup apps	Super Cup goals	Europe apps	Europe goals	Total apps	Total goals	International Career
1	(Armenia) Sergey Muradyan	2022–Present	87	4	9	0	1	0	30	0	127	4	Armenia (Note: Muradyan was born in Russia, but went on to represent Armenia.)
2	(Armenia) Gor Manvelyan	2023–Present	76	13	12	1	1	0	27	3	116	17	Armenia
3	(Armenia) Hovhannes Hambardzumyan	2023–Present	71	6	11	2	1	0	21	1	104	9	Armenia
4	(Portugal) Hélder Ferreira	2024–Present	57	27	11	5	1	1	34	6	103	39	Portugal U20

=== 25–99 appearances ===
	Name	Years	League apps	League goals	Cup apps	Cup goals	Super Cup apps	Super Cup goals	Europe apps	Europe goals	Total apps	Total goals	International Career
5	(Burkina Faso) Gustavo Sangaré	2024–Present	44	4	7	0	1	0	32	1	84	5	Burkina Faso
6	(Brazil) Matheus Aiás	2024–2026	38	19	9	4	0	0	30	9	77	32	-
7	(Armenia) Benik Hovhannisyan	2018–2022	61	2	6	1	1	0	3	0	71	3	Armenia
8	(Russia) Maksim Mayrovich	2019–2022	63	22	6	4	0	0	0	0	69	26	Russia U21
8	(Portugal) Gonçalo Silva	2024–2026	38	4	7	0	0	0	24	0	69	4	Portugal U21
10	(Armenia) Yuri Gareginyan	2018–2021	57	3	7	0	1	0	0	0	65	3	Armenia
10	(Netherlands) Imran Oulad Omar	2024–2026	36	11	7	1	0	0	22	5	65	17	-
10	(Cameroon) Yan Eteki	2024–Present	36	0	8	0	1	0	20	1	65	5	Cameroon
13	(Italy) Valerio Vimercati	2019–2021, 2023–2024	55	0	7	0	1	0	1	0	64	0	-
14	(Armenia) Jordy Monroy	2020–2022	54	1	5	0	1	0	2	0	62	0	Armenia (Note: Monroy was born in Colombia, but went on to represent Armenia.)
14	(Serbia) Aleksandar Miljković	2023–2025	45	2	5	0	0	0	12	2	62	4	Serbia U21
14	(France) Virgile Pinson	2023–2026	37	7	6	0	0	0	19	4	62	11	-
17	(Armenia) Ognjen Čančarević	2024–2026	39	0	3	0	0	0	19	1	61	1	Armenia (Note: Čančarević was born in SR Serbia, but went on to represent Armenia.)
18	(Croatia) Marin Jakoliš	2025–Present	34	8	6	3	1	0	18	1	59	12	Croatia U21
18	(Ghana) Eric Boakye	2025–Present	33	0	6	0	1	0	19	0	59	0	-
20	(Armenia) Artur Grigoryan	2017–2019	54	2	4	0	0	0	0	0	58	2	-
21	(Armenia) Karen Harutyunyan	2017–2020	50	3	5	0	0	0	0	0	55	3	-
21	(Portugal) Alex Oliveira	2020–2022	48	6	5	0	0	0	2	0	55	6	-
23	(Russia) Dmitri Lavrishchev	2019–2021	48	4	4	1	1	1	1	0	54	6	-
23	(Portugal) David Sualehe	2025–Present	28	1	6	2	1	0	19	0	54	3	Portugal U19
25	(Guinea-Bissau) Saná Gomes	2020–2021	44	2	4	0	1	0	3	0	52	2	Guinea-Bissau
25	(Slovakia) Martin Gamboš	2023–2025	42	1	3	0	0	0	7	0	52	1	Slovakia U21
27	(Latvia) Eduards Emsis	2019–2021	40	1	7	0	1	0	3	0	51	1	Latvia
27	(Russia) Vladimir Azarov	2019–2021	41	14	9	3	0	0	1	0	51	17	Russia U17
27	(Japan) Takuto Oshima	2025–Present	31	2	4	0	1	0	15	0	51	2	-
30	(Russia) Vladislav Kryuchkov	2019–2021	39	1	8	0	1	0	1	0	49	1	Russia U19
31	(Armenia) Edgar Movsesyan	2018–2020, 2023–2024	46	9	2	0	0	0	0	0	48	9	Armenia U21
32	(Armenia) Grigor Aghekyan	2017–2018	41	21	5	2	0	0	0	0	46	23	Armenia U21
32	(Russia) Mikhail Kovalenko	2019–2021	36	2	6	0	1	0	3	0	46	2	-
32	(Portugal) Gonçalo Gregório	2024–2026	26	20	3	1	0	0	17	6	46	27	-
35	(Russia) Alan Tatayev	2018–2021	41	0	4	1	0	0	0	0	45	1	-
35	(Guadeloupe) Nathanaël Saintini	2025–Present	28	2	4	1	1	0	12	0	45	3	Guadeloupe
37	(Iceland) Guðmundur Þórarinsson	2024–2026	21	2	3	0	0	0	20	0	44	2	Iceland
38	(Moldova) Dan Spătaru	2020, 2022	38	5	3	1	1	0	1	0	43	6	Moldova
38	(Albania) Eraldo Çinari	2024–2025	26	14	5	1	0	0	12	1	43	16	Albania U21
38	(Bosnia and Herzegovina) Nardin Mulahusejnović	2025–2026	25	10	5	1	1	0	12	5	43	16	Bosnia and Herzegovina U21
41	(Armenia) Eduard Avagyan	2017–2019	41	8	1	0	0	0	0	0	42	8	-
41	(Belarus) Ayk Musakhanyan	2022–2023	40	1	2	0	0	0	0	0	42	1	-
43	(Bosnia and Herzegovina) Nermin Zolotić	2025–2026	26	3	10	0	0	0	5	0	41	3	Bosnia and Herzegovina
44	(Armenia) Emil Yeghiazaryan	2017–2019	35	6	4	1	0	0	0	0	39	7	Armenia U21
44	(Nigeria) Haggai Katoh	2022–2024	39	1	0	0	0	0	0	0	39	7	-
46	(Nigeria) Okezie Ebenezer	2022–2024	36	0	2	0	0	0	0	0	38	0	-
46	(Armenia) Artur Miranyan	2023–2024	36	23	2	1	0	0	0	0	38	24	Armenia
48	(Russia) Kirill Bor	2019–2021	31	3	3	0	1	0	1	1	36	4	-
48	(Ukraine) Denys Dedechko	2020–2021	29	0	3	1	1	1	3	0	36	2	Ukraine
50	(Nigeria) Friday Adams	2022–2024	33	2	2	0	0	0	0	0	35	2	-
50	(Armenia) Ruben Yesayan	2022–2023	33	3	2	0	0	0	0	0	35	3	-
50	(Portugal) Martim Maia	2023–2024	33	1	2	0	0	0	0	0	35	1	-
50	(Netherlands) Justin Mathieu	2023–2024	33	4	2	0	0	0	0	0	35	4	Netherlands U17
50	(Armenia) Zaven Khudaverdyan	2024–Present	28	3	7	1	0	0	0	0	35	4	Armenia U15
55	(Russia) Pavel Deobald	2019–2021	28	2	4	0	1	0	1	0	34	2	-
55	(Russia) Pavel Kireyenko	2020–2021	27	7	5	0	0	0	2	0	34	7	-
55	(Armenia) Levon Vardanyan	2022–2023	33	8	1	0	0	0	0	0	34	8	Armenia U21
55	(Armenia) Robert Baghramyan	2022–2024	32	1	2	0	0	0	0	0	34	2	Armenia U21
55	(Netherlands) Ilias Alhaft	2023–2024	32	6	2	1	0	0	0	0	34	7	Netherlands U20
55	(Armenia) Artyom Avanesyan	2024–2026	22	2	1	0	1	0	10	0	34	2	Armenia
61	(Guinea-Bissau) Helistano Manga	2020–2021	27	0	5	1	1	0	0	0	33	1	-
61	(Burkina Faso) Dramane Salou	2022	31	3	2	1	0	0	0	0	33	4	Burkina Faso
61	(Netherlands) Jordy Tutuarima	2023–2024	32	0	1	0	0	0	0	0	33	0	Netherlands U18
61	(Armenia) Aram Khamoyan	2025–Present	27	1	3	1	0	0	3	0	33	2	Armenia
65	(Armenia) Argishti Petrosyan	2018–2019	28	1	4	0	0	0	0	0	32	0	Armenia U19
65	(Armenia) Hovhannes Nazaryan	2018–2020	28	0	4	0	0	0	0	0	32	0	Armenia U21
65	(Armenia) Sargis Shahinyan	2021–2022	29	0	1	0	0	0	2	0	32	0	Armenia U21
68	(Armenia) Artur Daniyelyan	2022–2024	29	0	2	0	0	0	0	0	31	0	Armenia U21
68	(South Korea) Yeon-seung Kim	2022–2023	29	2	2	0	0	0	0	0	31	2	-
68	(France) Alexandre Llovet	2023	30	8	1	0	0	0	0	0	31	8	-
71	(Armenia) Artak Dashyan	2024–2025	19	1	2	0	0	0	9	0	30	0	Armenia
72	(Russia) Soslan Kagermazov	2019–2020	24	0	4	0	0	0	1	0	29	0	-
72	(Armenia) Gegham Harutyunyan	2021–2022	26	4	3	0	0	0	0	0	29	4	-
72	(Ghana) Raymond Gyasi	2021–2022	24	1	3	1	0	0	2	0	29	2	Ghana U23
72	(Armenia) Grenik Petrosyan	2024–2025	20	2	3	0	0	0	6	0	29	2	Armenia U21
76	(Russia) Arsen Ayrapetyan	2022–2023	26	0	2	0	0	0	0	0	28	0	-
77	(Armenia) Hakob Hambardzumyan	2018–2019	25	1	2	0	0	0	0	0	27	1	Armenia U21
78	(Armenia) Arman Meliksetyan	2018–2020	22	0	4	0	0	0	0	0	26	0	Armenia U21
79	(Armenia) Gor Mkrtumyan	2017–2018	24	4	1	0	0	0	0	0	25	4	-
79	(Armenia) Arsen Hovhannisyan	2017–2018	23	3	2	0	0	0	0	0	25	3	Armenia U19
79	(Armenia) Petros Avetisyan	2021–2022	19	7	4	2	0	0	2	0	25	9	Armenia
79	(Russia) Aleksey Ploshchadny	2024–2026	16	0	2	0	1	0	6	0	25	0	-
79	(Romania) Valentin Costache	2026–Present	17	1	3	1	1	0	4	1	25	3	Romania U21

=== 1–24 appearances ===
	Name	Years	League apps	League goals	Cup apps	Cup goals	Super Cup apps	Super Cup goals	Europe apps	Europe goals	Total apps	Total goals	International Career
84	(Armenia) Vardan Shahatuni	2022	22	0	2	0	0	0	0	0	24	0	Armenia U21
84	(Armenia) Hayk Ghevondyan	2022–2023	23	1	1	0	0	0	0	0	24	1	Armenia U19
84	(Nigeria) Goodnews Igbokwe	2022–2024	23	6	1	0	0	0	0	0	24	6	-
84	(Netherlands) Paul Gladon	2023–2024	22	9	2	0	0	0	0	0	24	9	-
88	(Armenia) Karen Muradyan	2022–2023	22	0	1	0	0	0	0	0	23	0	Armenia U19
88	(Argentina) Bryan Mendoza	2024–2025	15	1	1	0	0	0	7	0	23	1	-
88	(Brazil) Arthur Coneglian	2024–Present	18	0	5	0	0	0	0	0	23	0	-
91	(Armenia) Vardan Movsisyan	2019–2021	21	0	1	0	0	0	0	0	22	0	-
91	(Armenia) Vigen Avetisyan	2019–2020	19	2	3	0	0	0	0	0	22	0	-
91	(Moldova) Vadim Paireli	2021	18	4	4	0	0	0	0	0	22	4	Moldova
91	(Russia) Albert Gabarayev	2021–2022	21	1	1	0	0	0	0	0	22	1	-
91	(Armenia) Vaspurak Minasyan	2023–2024	21	0	1	0	0	0	0	0	22	0	Armenia U21
96	(Russia) Rostislav Golovach	2017–2018	19	0	2	0	0	0	0	0	21	0	-
96	(Armenia) Grigori Matevosyan	2021–2022	20	0	1	0	0	0	0	0	21	0	Armenia U19
96	(Brazil) Pablo Santos	2024–2025	13	4	0	0	0	0	8	0	21	4	-
99	(Brazil) Jefferson Oliveira	2021	15	0	3	0	0	0	2	0	20	4	-
99	(Croatia) Alen Grgić	2025–2026	10	0	0	0	0	0	10	2	20	2	-
101	(Russia) Samur Agamagomedov	2018–2019	19	0	0	0	0	0	0	0	19	0	-
101	(Armenia) Hamlet Asoyan	2018–2019	19	4	0	0	0	0	0	0	19	4	Armenia U21
101	(Nigeria) Charles Ikechukwu	2021–2022	19	2	0	0	0	0	0	0	19	2	-
101	(Armenia) Vahagn Hayrapetyan	2022–2023	18	0	1	0	0	0	0	0	19	0	Armenia U21
105	(Uruguay) Nico Varela	2023–2024	17	1	1	0	0	0	0	0	18	1	-
105	(Mozambique) David Malembana	2023–2024	16	0	2	0	0	0	0	0	18	0	Mozambique
105	(Armenia) Hovhannes Harutyunyan	2025–2026	13	0	2	0	0	0	3	1	18	1	Armenia
105	(Serbia) Marko Lazetić	2026–Present	13	10	1	0	0	0	4	0	18	10	Serbia U21
109	(Armenia) Narek Gyozalyan	2017	16	2	1	0	0	0	0	0	17	2	Armenia U19
110	(Armenia) Vahagn Minasyan	2018–2019	13	0	3	0	0	0	0	0	16	0	Armenia
110	(Armenia) Vardan Bakalyan	2019	16	2	0	0	0	0	0	0	16	2	Armenia U21
110	(Russia) Andrei Titov	2021–2022	10	0	4	0	0	0	2	0	16	0	-
110	(Russia) Igor Smirnov	2021–2022	19	2	0	0	0	0	0	0	19	2	-
110	(Portugal) Bruno Almeida	2025	12	2	4	2	0	0	0	0	16	4	-
110	(Democratic Republic of the Congo) Stone Mambo	2026–Present	12	0	1	0	0	0	3	0	16	0	-
116	(Armenia) Vazgen Yeranosyan	2017	13	0	2	0	0	0	0	0	15	0	-
116	(Armenia) Arthur Sahakyan	2017	14	1	1	0	0	0	0	0	15	1	-
116	(Armenia) Davit Babayan	2017	14	1	1	0	0	0	0	0	15	1	Armenia U17
116	(Armenia) Grigor Makaryan	2017	14	0	1	0	0	0	0	0	15	0	Armenia U21
116	(Ukraine) Oleksandr Tupchiyenko	2018	11	0	4	0	0	0	0	0	15	0	-
116	(Armenia) Artur Kartashyan	2021–2022	15	0	0	0	0	0	0	0	15	0	Armenia
116	(Moldova) Evgheni Oancea	2022	15	1	0	0	0	0	0	0	15	1	Moldova U21
123	(Armenia) Eric Nazaryan	2018–2019	14	1	0	0	0	0	0	0	14	1	-
123	(Armenia) Hovhannes Poghosyan	2018	10	1	4	0	0	0	0	0	14	1	-
123	(Russia) Sergey Dmitriev	2019–2020	10	0	4	0	0	0	0	0	14	0	-
123	(Armenia) Aleksandr Karapetyan	2021	11	4	1	0	0	0	2	0	14	4	Armenia
123	(Armenia) Patvakan Avetisyan	2022	13	0	1	0	0	0	0	0	14	0	Armenia U19
123	(Armenia) Arman Khachatryan	2022	12	0	2	0	0	0	0	0	14	0	Armenia U17
129	(Armenia) Walter Poghosyan	2018	13	3	0	0	0	0	0	0	13	3	Armenia
129	(Armenia) Armen Durunts	2017	11	0	2	0	0	0	0	0	13	0	-
129	(Armenia) Sarkis Baloyan	2018	10	0	3	0	0	0	0	0	13	0	Armenia U21
129	(Armenia) Norayr Gyozalyan	2018–2019	11	0	2	0	0	0	0	0	13	0	Armenia U19
129	(Armenia) Norayr Nikoghosyan	2022–2023	12	0	1	0	0	0	0	0	13	0	Armenia U21
129	(Armenia) Karen Nalbandyan	2022–2023	13	0	0	0	0	0	0	0	13	0	Armenia U21
129	(Portugal) Dani Figueira	2026–Present	8	0	1	0	0	0	4	0	13	0	Portugal U20
136	(Russia) Vitali Zaprudskikh	2019–2020	11	0	1	0	0	0	0	0	12	0	-
136	(Armenia) David Manoyan	2019	10	2	2	0	0	0	0	0	12	2	Armenia
136	(Armenia) Samvel Hakobyan	2022–2023	11	0	1	0	0	0	0	0	12	0	Armenia U19
136	(Brazil) Marcos Pedro	2024–2025	8	1	3	0	0	0	1	0	12	1	-
136	(Spain) Mario González	2026–Present	9	1	1	0	0	0	2	0	12	1	Spain U17
141	(Armenia) Aghavard Petrosyan	2018	11	2	0	0	0	0	0	0	11	2	Armenia U21
141	(Russia) Ramazan Isayev	2018	11	5	0	0	0	0	0	0	11	5	-
141	(Armenia) Vahan Adloyan	2017	11	1	0	0	0	0	0	0	11	1	Armenia U17
141	(Ivory Coast) Wilfried Eza	2019	11	0	0	0	0	0	0	0	11	0	-
141	(Kazakhstan) Akmal Bakhtiyarov	2018	8	3	3	1	0	0	0	0	11	1	Kazakhstan U21
141	(Armenia) Artyom Simonyan	2020–2021	9	3	0	0	1	0	1	0	11	3	Armenia (Note: Simonyan was born in Russia, but went on to represent Armenia.)
141	(Russia) Artem Filippov	2021	11	0	0	0	0	0	0	0	11	0	-
141	(Nigeria) Peter Olawale	2023	11	0	0	0	0	0	0	0	11	0	Nigeria U19
141	(Ghana) Brian Oddei	2026–Present	8	0	0	0	0	0	3	0	11	0	-
150	(Ukraine) Mykhaylo Babiy	2018	10	6	0	0	0	0	0	0	10	6	-
150	(Russia) Dmitry Dushin	2018	10	1	0	0	0	0	0	0	10	1	-
150	(Armenia) Gevorg Poghosyan	2018	8	0	2	0	0	0	0	0	10	0	-
150	(Lithuania) Rokas Krusnauskas	2020	7	2	3	0	0	0	0	0	10	2	Lithuania U21
150	(Russia) Yaroslav Matviyenko	2021–2022	10	2	0	0	0	0	0	0	10	2	-
150	(Romania) Raul Bălbărău	2023	10	0	0	0	0	0	0	0	10	0	Romania U21
150	(Armenia) Petros Afajanyan	2022	10	1	0	0	0	0	0	0	10	1	Armenia U21
150	(Democratic Republic of the Congo) Dieumerci Mbokani	2023–2024	10	2	0	0	0	0	0	0	10	2	DR Congo
150	(France) Bilal Fofana	2024–Present	9	0	1	0	0	0	0	0	10	0	France U16
150	(Democratic Republic of the Congo) Timothy Fayulu	2025–2026	4	0	1	0	0	0	5	0	10	0	DR Congo
160	(Armenia) Vahe Mirakyan	2017	8	0	1	0	0	0	0	0	9	0	-
160	(Armenia) Karen Shakhkeldyan	2017	8	0	1	0	0	0	0	0	9	0	-
160	(Armenia) Narek Gyozalyan	2017	7	0	2	0	0	0	0	0	9	0	-
160	(Ukraine) Dmytro Klimakov	2019	9	1	0	0	0	0	0	0	9	1	-
160	(Serbia) Dobrivoje Velemir	2021	7	0	2	0	0	0	0	0	9	0	-
160	(Armenia) Gevorg Tarakhchyan	2022	9	0	0	0	0	0	0	0	9	0	-
160	(Ghana) Israel Opoku	2022	9	1	0	0	0	0	0	0	9	1	-
160	(Russia) Aleksandr Nesterov	2022	9	0	0	0	0	0	0	0	9	0	-
160	(Republic of the Congo) Christoffer Mafoumbi	2023	9	0	0	0	0	0	0	0	9	0	Congo
160	(Belgium) Rob Nizet	2026	9	0	0	0	0	0	0	0	9	0	Belgium U21
170	(Ukraine) Viktor Martyan	2017	7	2	1	0	0	0	0	0	8	2	-
170	(Russia) Marat Burayev	2018	7	1	1	0	0	0	0	0	8	1	-
170	(Armenia) Edgar Grigoryan	2019–2020	7	0	1	0	0	0	0	0	8	0	Armenia U21
170	(Russia) Maksim Shvagirev	2019–2020	4	0	4	0	0	0	0	0	8	0	-
170	(Russia) Sergey Mikhailov	2019	8	0	0	0	0	0	0	0	8	0	-
170	(Armenia) Armen Nahapetyan	2022	8	0	0	0	0	0	0	0	8	0	Armenia U21
170	(Armenia) Anatoly Ayvazov	2022–2023	8	0	0	0	0	0	0	0	8	0	Armenia U21
170	(Senegal) Alfred N'Diaye	2024	7	0	1	0	0	0	0	0	8	0	Senegal
170	(Brazil) James Santos	2025	5	0	3	0	0	0	0	0	8	0	-
170	(Slovenia) Michael Pavlović	2026–Present	5	0	1	0	0	0	2	0	8	0	Slovenia U21
170	(Ghana) Clinton Dombila	2026–Present	8	0	0	0	0	0	0	0	8	0	-
181	(Armenia) Vadim Hayriyan	2017–2018	6	0	1	0	0	0	0	0	7	0	-
181	(Russia) Muslim Bammatgereev	2018	7	1	0	0	0	0	0	0	7	1	-
181	(Armenia) Armo Adamyan	2017–2018	5	0	2	0	0	0	0	0	7	0	-
181	(Armenia) Rafael Ghazaryan	2018	7	1	0	0	0	0	0	0	7	1	-
181	(Ukraine) Yegor Lugovyi	2017–2018	5	0	2	0	0	0	0	0	7	0	-
181	(Georgia (country)) Irakli Bidzinashvili	2018	5	0	2	0	0	0	0	0	7	0	Georgia U21
181	(Russia) Aleksei Turik	2019	6	0	1	0	0	0	0	0	7	0	Russia U19
181	(Latvia) Aleksejs Grjaznovs	2022	7	0	0	0	0	0	0	0	7	0	Latvia
181	(Armenia) Arsen Galstyan	2023	7	0	0	0	0	0	0	0	7	0	Armenia U21
181	(Armenia) Gor Abrahamyan	2022–2025	7	0	0	0	0	0	0	0	7	0	-
181	(New Zealand) Logan Rogerson	2024	6	0	1	0	0	0	0	0	7	0	New Zealand
181	(Armenia) Artur Movsesyan	2024–Present	5	0	2	0	0	0	0	0	7	0	Armenia U19
181	(Serbia) Saša Zdjelar	2026–Present	6	0	1	0	0	0	0	0	7	0	Serbia
194	(Armenia) Erik Meliksetyan	2018–2019	6	0	0	0	0	0	0	0	6	0	Armenia U19
194	(Armenia) Arman Hovhannisyan	2017–2018	6	0	0	0	0	0	0	0	6	0	-
194	(Armenia) Zhora Nazaryan	2017	5	0	1	0	0	0	0	0	6	0	-
194	(Armenia) Ashot Adamyan	2021–2022	6	0	0	0	0	0	0	0	6	0	-
194	(Armenia) Erjanik Ghubasaryan	2023–2024	6	0	0	0	0	0	0	0	6	0	Armenia
194	(Armenia) Harutyun Melkonyan	2022–2024	6	0	0	0	0	0	0	0	6	0	Armenia U19
194	(Portugal) Pedro Farrim	2023–2024	6	0	0	0	0	0	0	0	6	0	-
201	(Russia) Maksim Danilin	2021	4	0	1	0	0	0	0	0	5	0	Russia U19
201	(Russia) Pavel Ovchinnikov	2021	3	0	0	0	0	0	2	0	5	0	-
201	(Russia) Grigori Trufanov	2022	5	0	0	0	0	0	0	0	5	0	Russia U17
201	(Bosnia and Herzegovina) Aleksandar Glišić	2023	5	0	0	0	0	0	0	0	5	0	-
201	(Armenia) Albert Gareginyan	2025–Present	4	1	1	0	0	0	0	0	5	1	Armenia U19
201	(Armenia) Mark Avetisyan	2026–Present	4	0	1	0	0	0	0	0	5	0	Armenia U21
207	(Armenia) Tigran Simonyan	2017–2018	3	0	1	0	0	0	0	0	4	0	-
207	(Ivory Coast) Geo Danny Ekra	2019	4	0	0	0	0	0	0	0	4	0	-
207	(Armenia) Artur Stepanyan	2018–2020	4	0	0	0	0	0	0	0	4	0	-
207	(Russia) Nikita Dubchak	2021–2022	2	0	1	0	1	0	0	0	4	0	-
207	(Moldova) Alexei Ciopa	2022	4	0	0	0	0	0	0	0	4	0	Moldova U21
207	(Armenia) Tigran Sargsyan	2021–2024	4	0	0	0	0	0	0	0	4	0	Armenia U19
207	(Mali) Kalifala Doumbia	2026–Present	3	1	0	0	0	0	1	0	4	0	-
214	(Russia) Aleksei Solosin	2019	3	0	0	0	0	0	0	0	3	0	-
214	(Burkina Faso) Abdoul Gafar	2019	3	0	0	0	0	0	0	0	3	0	-
214	(Armenia) Arman Mkrtchyan	2020–2021	3	0	0	0	0	0	0	0	3	0	Armenia U21
214	(Belarus) Ilya Udodov	20222	3	0	0	0	0	0	0	0	3	0	-
218	(Armenia) Arsen Harutyunyan	2017–2018	1	0	1	0	0	0	0	0	2	0	-
218	(Armenia) Albert Ohanyan	2017–2018	1	0	1	0	0	0	0	0	2	0	Armenia U21
218	(Russia) Aleksandr Golovnya	2021	2	0	0	0	0	0	0	0	2	0	-
218	(Brazil) Allef	2023–2024	2	0	0	0	0	0	0	0	2	0	-
218	(Armenia) Rumyan Hovsepyan	2023	2	0	0	0	0	0	0	0	2	0	Armenia
218	(Armenia) Gagik Meloyan	2024–2025	2	0	0	0	0	0	0	0	2	0	-
218	(Armenia) Misak Hakobyan	2026	2	0	0	0	0	0	0	0	2	0	Armenia U21
225	(Armenia) David Asatryan	2017	1	0	0	0	0	0	0	0	1	0	Armenia U17
225	(Armenia) Davit Israelyan	2017	1	0	0	0	0	0	0	0	1	0	-
225	(Russia) Maksim Yermakov	2018	1	0	0	0	0	0	0	0	1	0	-
225	(Armenia) Arman Simonyan	2023	1	0	0	0	0	0	0	0	1	0	-
225	(Armenia) Karen Galstyan	2024	1	0	0	0	0	0	0	0	1	0	Armenia U17
225	(Armenia) Hovhannes Gevorgyan	2024–2026	1	0	0	0	0	0	0	0	1	0	-
225	(Armenia) Gor Grigoryan	2024–Present	1	0	0	0	0	0	0	0	1	0	Armenia U19
225	(Armenia) Andranik Karapetyan	2024–Present	1	0	0	0	0	0	0	0	1	0	-
225	(Armenia) Gevorg Grigoryan	2024–2026	1	0	0	0	0	0	0	0	1	0	Armenia U19
225	(Armenia) Michael Asiryan	2024–Present	1	0	0	0	0	0	0	0	1	0	Armenia U19
225	(Greece) Marios Sofianos	2026–Present	1	0	0	0	0	0	0	0	1	0	Greece U21

== Team ==
=== Record wins ===
- Record win: 12–0

v Erebuni, 2017–18 Armenian First League, 26 March 2018.

- Record League win: 12–0

v Erebuni, 2017–18 Armenian First League, 26 March 2018.

- Record Armenian Cup win: 4–0

v Gandzasar Kapan, 2024–25 Armenian Cup, 2 April 2025.

- Record European win: 7–0

v Sliema Wanderers, 2024–25 UEFA Conference League, 25 July 2024.

- Record home win: 12–0

v Erebuni, 2017–18 Armenian First League, 26 March 2018.

- Record away win: 0–6

v Alashkert, 2024–25 Armenian Premier League, 16 October 2024.

=== Record defeats ===
- Record defeat: 0–6

v Chelsea, 2024–25 UEFA Conference League League Phase Matchday 3, 8 November 2024.

- Record League defeat: 0–6

v Alashkert, 2018–19 Armenian Premier League, 1 September 2018.
v Urartu, 2022–23 Armenian Premier League, 20 August 2022.

- Record Armenian Cup defeat: 0–4

v Alashkert, 2017–18 Armenian Cup Quarter-Final 2nd leg, 19 October 2017.

- Record European defeat: 0–8

v Chelsea, 2024–25 UEFA Conference League League Phase Matchday 3, 8 November 2024.

- Record home defeat: 0–6

v Urartu, 2022–23 Armenian Premier League, 20 August 2022.

- Record away defeat: 0–8

v Chelsea, 2024–25 UEFA Conference League League Phase Matchday 3, 8 November 2024.

=== Wins/draws/losses in a season ===
- Most wins in a league season: 26 – 2023–24
- Most draws in a league season: 12 – 2021–22
- Most defeats in a league season: 20 – 2022-23
- Fewest wins in a league season: 6 – 2018-19
- Fewest draws in a league season: 2 – 2017-18, 2023–24
- Fewest defeats in a league season: 3 – 2024–25, 2025–26

=== Goals ===
- Most goals scored in a season: 131 – 2024-25
- Most League goals scored in a season: 92 – 2024-25
- Fewest League goals scored in a season: 25 – 2018-19
- Most League goals conceded in a season: 66 – 2022–23
- Fewest League goals conceded in a season: 16 – 2017-18

==== List of hat-tricks ====
The Result column shows the Noah score first.

As of match played 25 April 2026

Key
(X)	Number of times player scored a hat-trick (only for players with multiple hat-tricks)
4	Player scored four goals
5	Player scored five goals
6	Player scored six goals
	Noah lost the match
	Noah drew the match

#	Player	G	Against	Res.	Date	Competition	Home/Away/Neutral	Ref.
1	(Armenia) Grigor Aghekyan	3	Erebuni	12–0	26 March 2018	First League	Home	
2	(Armenia) Artur Miranyan	3	West Armenia	5–1	29 November 2023	Premier League	Home	
3	(Portugal) Gonçalo Gregório	3	Sliema Wanderers	7–0	25 July 2024	UEFA Conference League	Home	
4	(Albania) Eraldo Çinari	3	Gandzasar Kapan	7–0	8 December 2024	Premier League	Home	
5	(Portugal) Gonçalo Gregório (2)	4	West Armenia	7–1	15 December 2024	Premier League	Home	
6	(Netherlands) Imran Oulad Omar	3	Olimpija Ljubljana	4–1	21 August 2025	UEFA Conference League	Away	
