= 2017–18 Armenian First League =

Armenian First League
- Season: 2017–18
- Dates: 7 August 2017 – 28 May 2018
- Champions: Lori
- Promoted: Lori; Artsakh; Ararat-Moskva
- Relegated: none
- Matches: 133
- Goals: 474 (3.56 per match)
- Biggest home win: Artsakh 12–0 Erebuni (26 March 2018)
- Biggest away win: Gandzasar-2 1-7 Lori (26 March 2018)
- Highest scoring: Artsakh 12–0 Erebuni (26 March 2018)
- Longest winning run: Lori (10 matches)
- Longest unbeaten run: Lori (14 matches)
- Longest winless run: Shirak-2 (12 matches)
- Longest losing run: Shirak-2 (6 matches)
- All statistics correct as of 28 May 2018.

The 2017–18 Armenian First League season was the 26th since the establishment of the football league. The season was launched on August 7, 2017, and concluded on May 28, 2018. Banants-2 were the defending champions from the previous season.

== Team changes ==
3 newly founded teams have joined the 2017–18 Armenian First League season:

- Lori FC from Vanadzor, Lori Province
- Artsakh FC from Yerevan
- FC Ararat-Moskva Yerevan from Yerevan (played as FC Avan Academy during the 1st half of the season)

== Stadiums and locations ==
10 teams will take part in this season's competition, of which only 4 teams -Artsakh, Erebuni, Lori, and Ararat-Moskva- are eligible to get the promotion right to the 2018–19 Armenian Premier League by the end of the competition. The remaining 6 teams are the reserve teams of the football clubs currently participating in the Armenian Premier League competition.

Locations of the 2017–18 Armenian Premier League teams

Club	Location	Stadium	Capacity
Artsakh	Yerevan (Shengavit); Yerevan (Kentron); Dzoraghbyur (Kotayk)	Mika Stadium (matchday 1 to 8); Pyunik Stadium (matchday 9 to 14); Dzoraghbyur Training Centre (matchday 15 & onwards)	7,250; 780 n/a
Ararat-Armenia	Yerevan (Avan)	Football Academy Stadium	1,428
Erebuni	Ashtarak (Aragatsotn)	Kasaghi Marzik Stadium (matchday 11 & onwards)^{1}	3,600
Lori	Vanadzor	Vanadzor Football Academy^{2}	100
Alashkert-2	Yerevan (Shengavit); Ashtarak (Aragatsotn)	Alashkert Stadium (matchday 1 to 14); Kasaghi Marzik Stadium (matchday 15 & onwards)	6,800; 3,600
Ararat-2	Dzoraghbyur (Kotayk)	Dzoraghbyur Training Centre	n/a
Banants-2	Yerevan (Malatia-Sebastia)	Banants Training Centre pitch#3	600
Gandzasar-2	Kapan	Gandzasar Training Centre	n/a
Pyunik-2	Yerevan (Kentron)	Pyunik Stadium	780
Shirak-2	Gyumri	Gyumri City Stadium	2,844

- ^{1}Erebuni will play at the Kasaghi Marzik Stadium, Ashtarak, instead of their own Erebuni Stadium, Yerevan. However, the team used several stadiums in Yerevan until matchday 9.
- ^{2}Lori will play at the main training pitch of the Vanadzor Football Academy due to the rebuilding of their regular venue Vanadzor City Stadium, Vanadzor.

=== Personnel and sponsorship ===
Team	President	Manager	Captain	Kit manufacturer	Shirt sponsor
Artsakh	(Armenia) (Czech Republic) Sevan Aslanyan	(Armenia) Tigran Yesayan	(Armenia) Gor Mkrtumyan	Nike	Renault, Efubet,^{1} Steritech^{2}
Ararat-Moskva	(Armenia) Poghos Galstyan	(Armenia) Artak Oseyan	(Armenia) Hovhannes Harutyunyan^{4} (Armenia) Albert Khachumyan	Adidas	
Erebuni	(Armenia) Tigran Ayvazyan	(Armenia) Sevada Arzumanyan	(Armenia) Hayk Melkonyan^{3} (Armenia) Arsen Hakobyan	Joma	
Lori	(Armenia) Robert Grigoryan	(Armenia) Armen Adamyan	(Armenia) Gurgen Matevosyan	Puma	Jose Restaurant
Alashkert-2	(Armenia) Bagrat Navoyan	(Armenia) Sergey Erzrumyan	(Armenia) Artashes Arakelyan	Joma	Bagratour
Ararat-2	(Armenia) (Belgium) Hiraç Yagan	(Armenia) Georgi Andriasyan	(Armenia) Gevorg Poghosyan^{4} (Armenia) Armen Derdzyan	Jako	
Banants-2	(Armenia) Hrach Aghabekian	(Armenia) Vahe Gevorgyan (matchday 1 to 9) (Armenia) Samvel Nigoyan (matchday 10 & onwards)	(Armenia) Stepan Harutyunyan^{4} (Armenia) Suren Aloyan	Adidas	
Gandzasar-2	(Armenia) Garnik Aghababian	(Armenia) Ashot Manucharyan	(Armenia) Tigran Ivanyan	Adidas	ZCMC
Pyunik-2	(Armenia) (Russia) Artur Soghomonyan	(Armenia) Samvel Sargsyan (matchday 1 to 10) (Armenia) Albert Sarkisyan (matchday 11 & onwards)	(Armenia) Davit Terteryan^{4} (Armenia) Emil Ghukasyan	Nike	Gold's Gym
Shirak-2	(Armenia) Arman Sahakyan	(Armenia) Tigran Davtyan	(Armenia) Artur Amiryan	Adidas	

1. On the back of shirt, upside.
2. On the back of shirt, downside.
3. Died of a car accident on August 30, 2017 (after matchday 4).
4. Left the team at the end of the 1st half of the season (after matchday 14).

== League table ==
Pos	Team	Pld	W	D	L	GF	GA	GD	Pts	Promotion
1	Lori (C, P)	27	22	3	2	74	16	+58	69	Promotion to the Premier League
2	Artsakh (P)	27	21	2	4	77	16	+61	65	Promotion to the Premier League
3	Ararat-Moskva (P)	27	14	4	9	65	41	+24	46	Promotion to the Premier League
4	Banants-2	27	14	3	10	45	42	+3	45	Ineligible for promotion
5	Pyunik-2	27	13	1	13	49	44	+5	40	Ineligible for promotion
6	Alashkert-2	27	12	4	11	48	42	+6	40	Ineligible for promotion
7	Ararat Yerevan-2	27	7	4	16	36	55	−19	25	Ineligible for promotion
8	Erebuni	27	6	4	17	33	91	−58	22	
9	Gandzasar Kapan-2	27	6	2	19	31	74	−43	20	Ineligible for promotion
10	Shirak-2	27	5	3	19	22	59	−37	18	Ineligible for promotion

Source: Football Federation of Armenia (in Armenian)
Rules for classification: 1) Points; 2) Play-off (only if deciding champion); 3) Matches won; 4) Head-to-head points; 5) Head-to-head matches won; 6) Head-to-head goal difference; 7) Head-to-head goals scored; 8) Head-to-head away goals scored; 9) Goal difference; 10) Goals scored.
(C) Champions; (P) Promoted

== Season statistics ==
=== Top scorers ===
As of 28 May 2018

Rank	Player	Club	Goals
1	(Armenia) Grigor Aghekyan	Artsakh	18
2	(Armenia) Armen Hovhannisyan	Ararat-Moskva	15
3	(Armenia) Mher Sahakyan	Alashkert-2	14
3	(Armenia) Sos Tadevosyan	Erebuni	14
5	(Armenia) Erik Petrosyan	Pyunik-2	13
6	(Ghana) Tinga Kofi Tei	Lori	12
7	(Armenia) Armen Nahapetyan	Ararat-Moskva	11
8	(Armenia) Edgar Mkrtchyan	Lori	10
8	(Armenia) Vigen Avetisyan	Lori	10
10	(Armenia) Karen Khatuyev	Pyunik-2	9
10	(Armenia) Mher Harutyunyan	Gandzasar Kapan-2	9
