= Viktor Martyan =

Ukrainian footballer

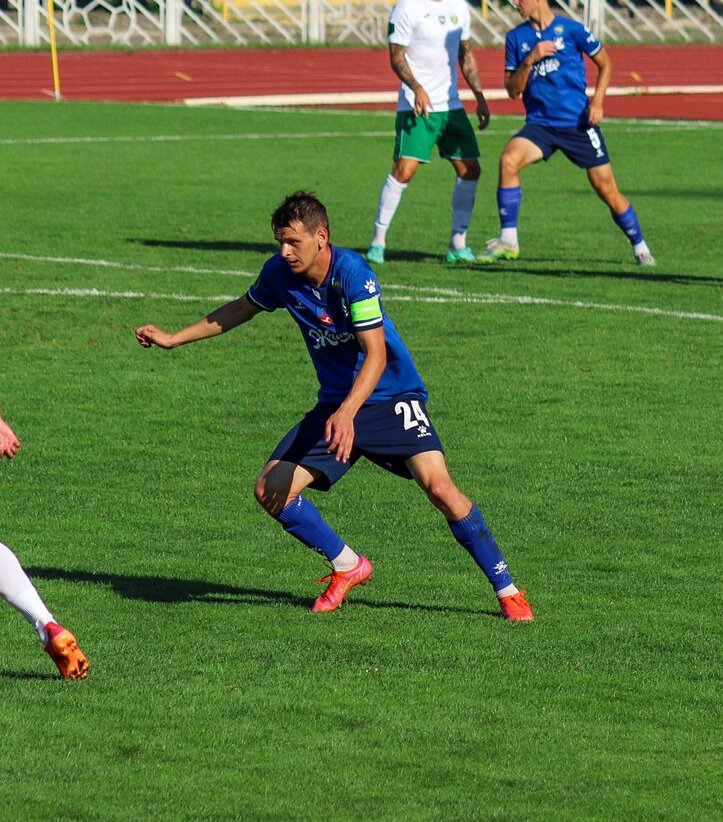

Personal information
- Full name: Viktor Viktorovych Martyan
- Date of birth: 20 September 1994 (age 32)
- Place of birth: Veremiivka, Cherkasy Oblast, Ukraine
- Height: 1.78 m (5 ft 10 in)
- Position: Forward

Team information
- Current team: Dnipro Cherkasy
- Number: 24

Youth career
- 2005–2011: FC Molod Poltava

Senior career*
Years	Team	Apps	(Gls)
2012–2015	Chornomorets Odesa	0	(0)
2014–2015	→ Krystal Kherson (loan)	26	(6)
2015–2016	Krystal Kherson	26	(1)
2017	Torpshammars IF	4	(3)
2017	Artsakh	?	(?)
2018	Mykolaiv	11	(0)
2018	→ Mykolaiv-2	3	(0)
2018–2020	Krystal Kherson	47	(6)
2021–	Dnipro Cherkasy	26	(5)
- * Club domestic league appearances and goals as of 8 November 2021

Viktor Viktorovych Martyan (Ukrainian: Віктор Вікторович Мартян; born 20 September 1994) is a professional Ukrainian football striker who plays for Dnipro Cherkasy.

== Career ==
Martyan is a product of youth team systems of FC Molod Poltava. In August 2012 he signed contract with FC Chornomorets.

In April 2017 he signed a half-year deal with Torpshammars IF in the Swedish Football Division 4.

== Honours ==
Krystal Kherson

- Ukrainian Second League: 2019–20
