= Walter Poghosyan =

Armenian footballer

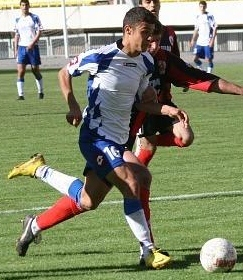
- Walter Poghosyan, is an Armenian footballer

Personal information
- Full name: Walter R. Poghosyan
- Date of birth: 16 May 1992 (age 34)
- Place of birth: Yerevan, Armenia
- Height: 1.78 m (5 ft 10 in)
- Position: Midfielder

Team information
- Current team: Banants Yerevan
- Number: 8

Youth career
- 2004–2008: Banants Yerevan

Senior career*
Years	Team	Apps	(Gls)
2008	Patani	13	(1)
2008–	Banants Yerevan	76	(6)

International career^{‡}
2009–	Armenia U-19	3	(0)
2010–	Armenia U-21	8	(4)
2012–	Armenia	1	(0)
- * Club domestic league appearances and goals as of 28 March 2013 ‡ National team caps and goals as of 28 March 2013

Walter Poghosyan (Armenian: Վալտեր Պողոսյան, born 16 May 1992 in Yerevan) is an Armenian football player who currently plays midfielder for the Armenia national football team and for Armenian Premier League club Banants Yerevan.

== Club career ==
Walter Poghosyan instilled an interest in football at an early age and started the sport when he was 7 years old. He initially went to football school Pyunik Yerevan, and later moved to the football school Banants Yerevan. At 13 years of age, the young football player received the attention of the club breeders. The club offered a contract at that time, which Poghosyan signed. In 2008, Poghosyan played for the youth team of Banants – Patani. He played two matches for the club in the Armenian Cup. The following year, Poghosyan debuted in the first team, which he played six league games for. In the 2010 Armenian Premier League, he received more experience and in each subsequent game showed skill. In the seventh round against Shirak Gyumri, the match opened with Banants scoring goals and winning 5–1. At the Football Federation of Armenia awards ceremony, held on 24 December, Poghosyan received the awards for "The most promising player" and "Discovery of the Year."

== International career ==
Pogosyan was on the sights of the Armenia U-21 youth team coaches in early 2010. The first match he played was at home against their peers from Georgia, where the Armenian team lost 2:3 to their guests. In two games for the Armenian U-19 youth team, Poghosyan scored two goals in each match. Subsequently, Pogosyan was invited to the Armenia national football team, but could not play for it due to an injury, which he received at the same time as the invitation. The third match of the youth team was also a 2013 UEFA European Under-21 Football Championship qualification match against Montenegro U-21, where the Armenian team defeated their rival 4–1.

On 28 February 2012, after a long break after the first call, he made his debut in the Armenia national team in a friendly match loss to Serbia. The match was held in Limassol, Cyprus. The Armenia national team consisted mainly of young players who were playing on that level for the first time. Poghosyan himself had the opportunity to score a goal, but missed. Armenia lost the match 0:2. At a press conference held on 2 March, Football Federation of Armenia President Ruben Hayrapetyan expressed his dissatisfaction with the game of Poghosyan, who he felt did not use his full potential.

== Honours ==
=== Club ===
Banants Yerevan

- Armenian Premier League runner-up (1): 2010
- Armenian Cup runner-up (2): 2009, 2010
- Armenian Supercup runner-up (1): 2010–11, 2011–12

=== Individual ===
- Discovery of the Year: 2010
- The most promising player: 2010
