= Armen Hovhannisyan (footballer) =

Armenian footballer

Personal information
- Full name: Armen Hovhannisyan
- Date of birth: 7 March 2000 (age 26)
- Place of birth: Yerevan, Armenia
- Height: 1.89 m (6 ft 2 in)
- Position: Centre forward

Team information
- Current team: Syunik
- Number: 9

Youth career
- Pyunik Yerevan
- 2018–2020: → Zemplín Michalovce (loan)

Senior career*
Years	Team	Apps	(Gls)
2017–2020	Ararat-Armenia	23	(15)
2018–2020	→ Zemplín Michalovce (loan)	13	(2)
2020–2021	Nitra	5	(0)
2020–2022	Ararat-Armenia	6	(0)
2020	→ Gandzasar Kapan (loan)	3	(0)
2022	Zimbru Chișinău	8	(3)
2022–2023	Episkopi	7	(1)
2023	→ Pietà Hotspurs (loan)	10	(4)
2023	Hibernians	11	(0)
2024	Mosta	14	(1)
2024–2025	Alashkert	17	(0)
2025–	Syunik	0	(0)

International career^{‡}
2016	Armenia U16	2	(1)
2016–2017	Armenia U17	11	(2)
2018	Armenia U18	3	(0)
2017–2019	Armenia U19	25	(7)
2019–2022	Armenia U21	10	(0)
- * Club domestic league appearances and goals as of 31 July 2025 ‡ National team caps and goals as of 12 June 2022

Armen Hovhannisyan (Armenian: Արմեն Հովհաննիսյան; born 7 March 2000) is an Armenian professional footballer who plays as a forward for Armenian First League club Syunik.

== Career ==
=== Zemplín Michalovce ===
Hovhannisyan made his professional debut for Zemplín Michalovce against DAC Dunajská Streda on 24 May 2019. DAC had won the game 5–0. Hovhannisyan had replaced Sadam Sulley 56 minutes into the game, when the score was 4–0. Souleymane Kone had scored the final goal some 13 minutes after Armen's arrival.

He scored his first league goal for Zemplín on 30 November 2019, in a match against iClinic Sereď at neutral Stadium Myjava, in a 2:0 victory. Hovhannisyan came on as a stoppage time replacement for Modibo Sidibé, but managed to score a goal from a counter-attack set by Christos Kountouriotis. He managed to score again in the next round too, during a home match against Spartak Trnava. Hovhannisyan came on as a replacement for Sidibé once again, this time after the Nigerien striker suffered an injury in the 50th minute. In this match, Hovhannisyan scored following a pass by Peter Kolesár, sealing the score of the game for 2:0.

=== Episkopi ===
On 26 July 2022, Episkopi announced the signing of Hovhannisyan.
