= Pyunik Training Centre =

FC Pyunik Training Centre
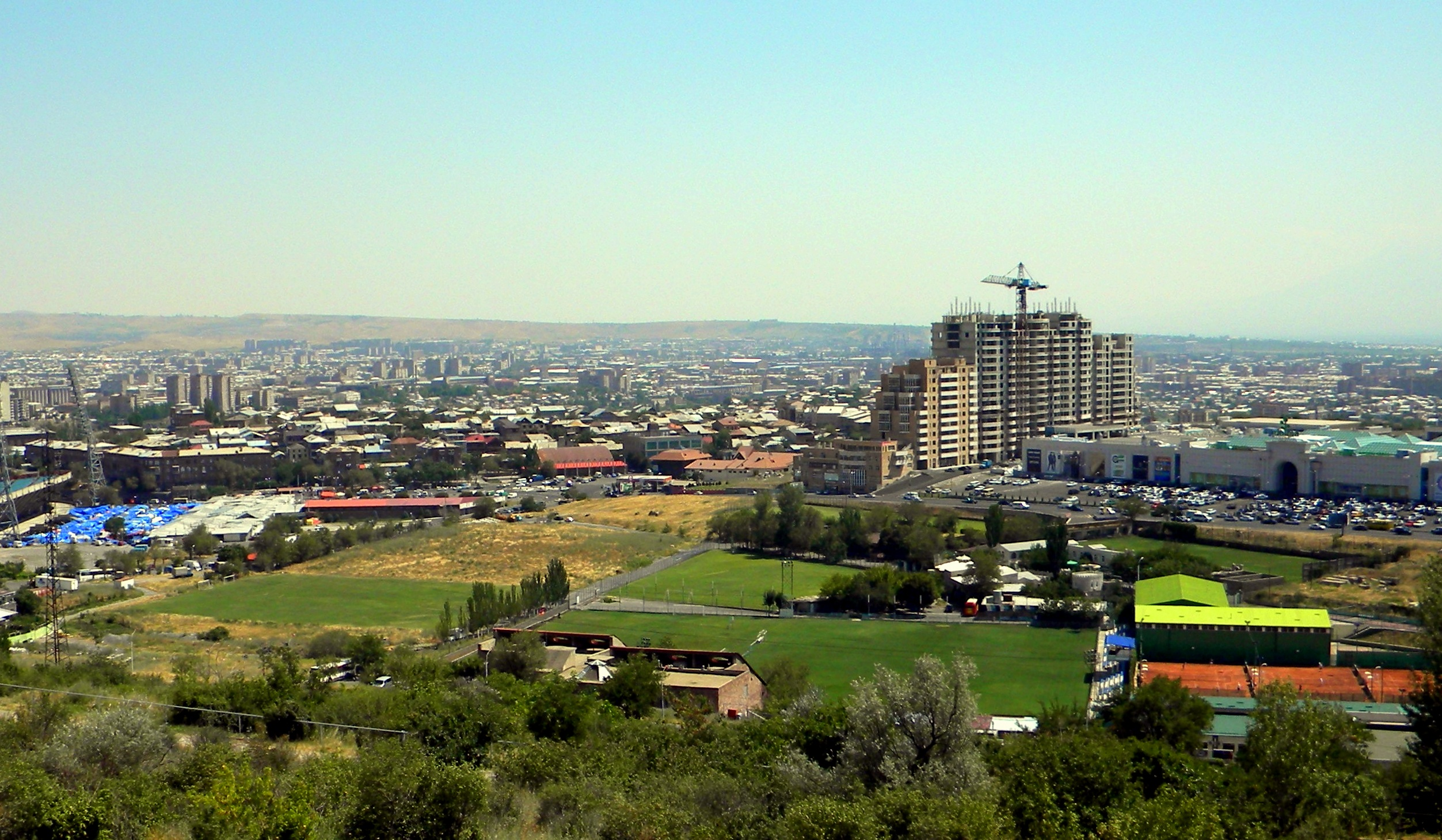
- Interactive map of FC Pyunik Training Centre
- Location: Yerevan; Armenia
- Coordinates: 40°10′55″N 44°29′24″E
- Owner: Ruben Hayrapetyan
- Operator: FC Pyunik
- Type: Football training facility

Construction
- Opened: 2004

Tenant
- FC Pyunik (training)

Pyunik Training Centre is the training ground and academy base of the Armenian football club FC Pyunik. It was opened in 2004 on the grounds of the former Kilikia Football School in the Kentron District of the capital Yerevan.

The centre is used for the training of youth and senior teams. It occupies an area of 48,000 m^{2}.

== Facilities ==
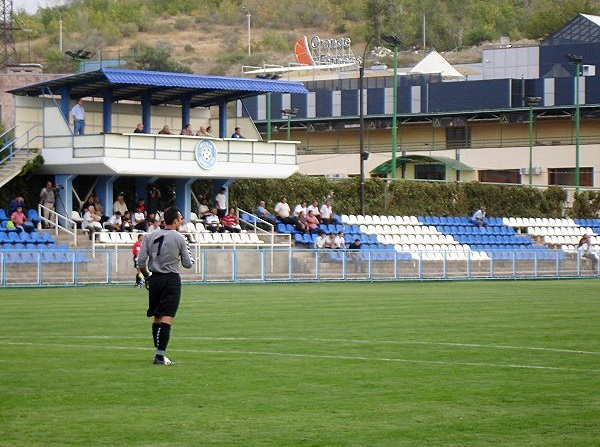
The main stadium

With a total area of 48,000 m^{2}, the centre is home to the following facilities:

- The main stadium of the training centre with an artificial turf (since 2016) and a capacity of 780 seats, the home ground of Pyunik-2; the reserve team of Pyunik.
- 2 full-size natural grass pitches.
- 2 seven-a-side (1 with artificial turf) and 2 five-a-side pitches.
- Indoor facilities housing the club headquarters and a service centre with gymnasium.
