= Dzoraghbyur =

Dzoraghbyur Ձորաղբյուր
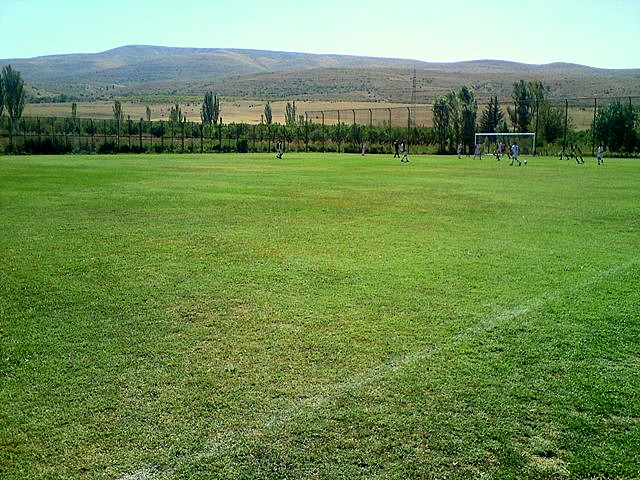
- Dzoraghbyur Training Centre

- Location within Armenia
- Coordinates: 40°12′18″N 44°38′35″E
- Country: Armenia
- Marz (Province): Kotayk
- Elevation: 1,350 m (4,430 ft)

Population (2011)
  - Total: 2,124
- Time zone: UTC+4 ( )

Dzoraghbyur (Armenian: Ձորաղբյուր); formerly known as Tedzhirabad, is a village in the Kotayk Province of Armenia. "Dzoraghbyur" translates roughly to English as "Canyon Fountain". It is located 10 km east of Yerevan and 35 km south of the regional centre Hrazdan.

The Dzoraghbyur Training Centre of FC Ararat Yerevan is located in the village of Dzoraghbyur.

== See also ==
- Kotayk Province
