= Kasakhi Marzik Stadium =

Football stadium in Ashtarak, Armenia

Coordinates: 40°17′28″N 44°21′08″E

Kasaghi Marzik Stadium Քասաղի մարզիկ մարզադաշտ
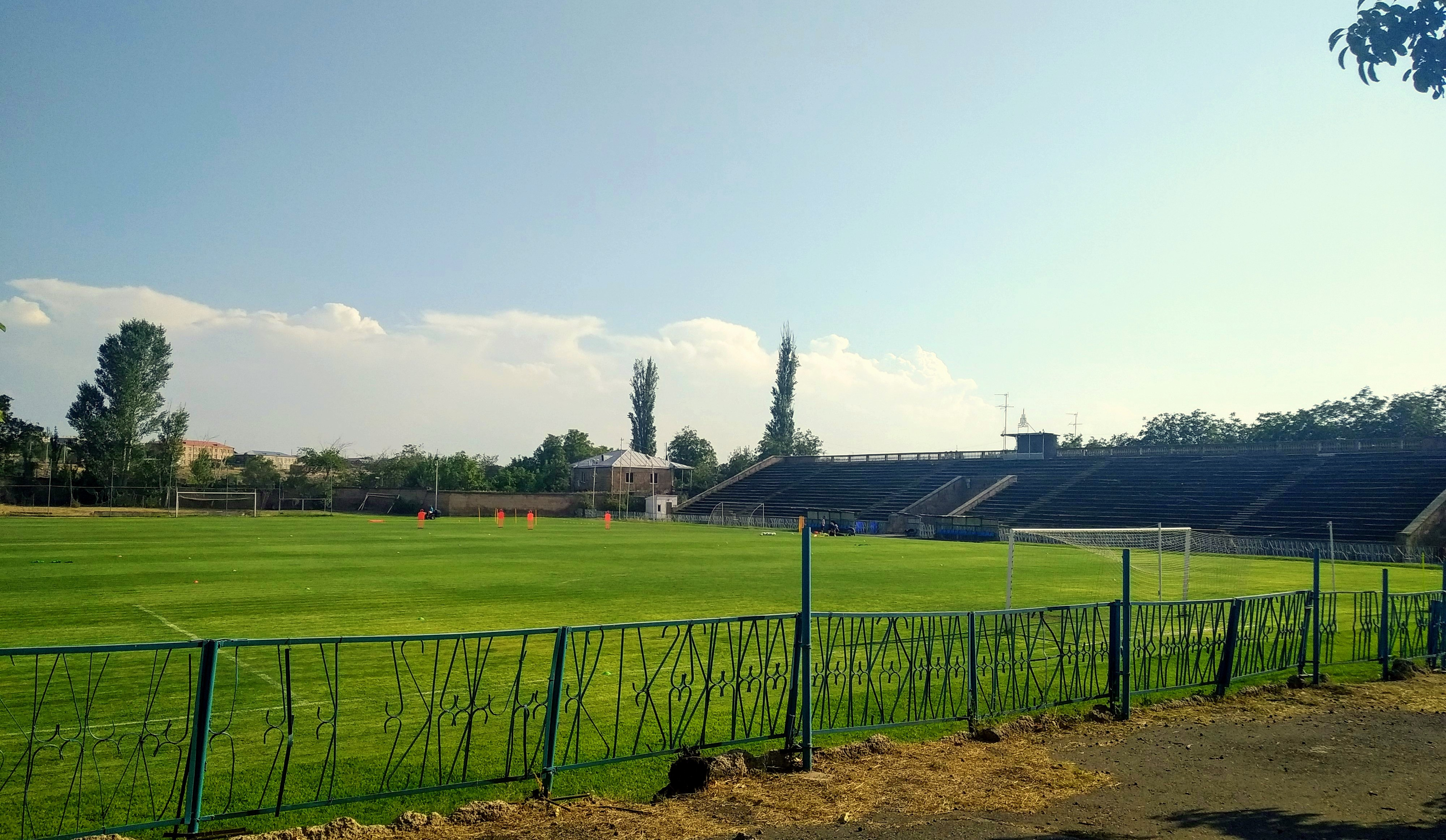
- Kasaghi Marzik Stadium Kasaghi Marzik Stadium
- Interactive map of Kasaghi Marzik Stadium; Քասաղի մարզիկ մարզադաշտ
- Location: Ashtarak, Armenia
- Owner: Ashtarak Town Council
- Capacity: 3,600
- Surface: grass
- Field size: 105 x 68 meters

Construction
- Built: 1971
- Renovated: 2012

Tenants
- Kasagh (1985–1999); Mika (1999–2007); Ulisses FC (2007); Aragats (2019-present)

Kasaghi Marzik Stadium (Armenian: Քասաղի մարզիկ մարզադաշտ) is a football stadium in Ashtarak, Armenia. It was opened in 1971 and is the former home ground of Mika, Ulisses, Aragats and Kasakh FC. The capacity of the stadium is 3,600. The administrator of the stadium is Armen Matevosyan.

Currently, the stadium is home to the Armenian First League teams of Ararat-2, Shirak-2 and Alashkert-2.

== Future developments ==
In the near future, the venue will be converted into an all-seater stadium and the capacity will be reduced to 2,000 seats.
