= Grigor Aghekyan =

Armenian professional footballer

Personal information
- Full name: Grigor Aghekyan
- Date of birth: 6 April 1996 (age 30)
- Place of birth: Yerevan, Armenia
- Position: Forward

Youth career
- 2013–2016: Banants

Senior career*
Years	Team	Apps	(Gls)
2013–2016	Banants-2	7	(2)
2016–2017	Banants	12	(1)
2017–2018	Artsakh	40	(19)
2019	Isloch Minsk Raion	5	(1)
2019	Lori	8	(3)
2020	Gandzasar	5	(0)
2020–2021	Alashkert	15	(0)

International career^{‡}
2016–2018	Armenia U21	9	(0)
- * Club domestic league appearances and goals as of 31 December 2021 ‡ National team caps and goals as of 18:40, 27 July 2020 (UTC)

Grigor Aghekyan (Armenian: Գրիգոր Աղեկյան; born 6 April 1996) is an Armenian former professional footballer.

== Career ==
=== Club ===
After leaving Gandzasar Kapan on 5 July 2020, Aghekyan signed a two-year contract with Alashkert on 27 July 2020.
