= Dzoraghbyur Training Centre =

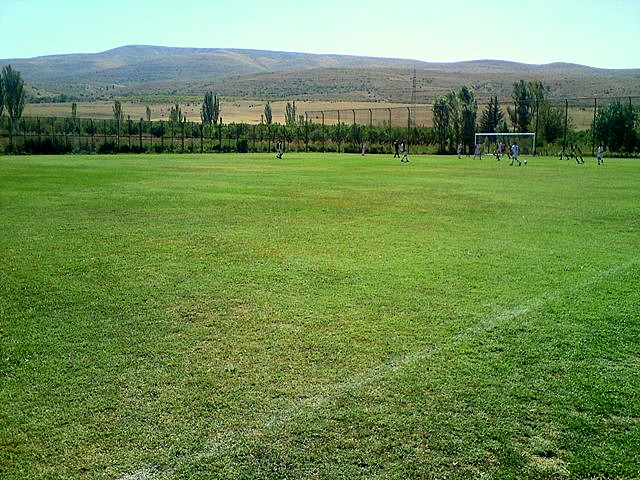
- Interactive map of Dzoraghbyur Training Centre
- Former names: Dzoraghbyur Sports Complex
- Location: Dzoraghbyur, Kotayk Province, Armenia
- Coordinates: 40°12′13″N 44°39′04″E
- Owner: FC Ararat Yerevan
- Type: Football training facility

Construction
- Opened: 2007
- Cost: US$2 million

Tenants
- Ararat Yerevan (training); Ararat Yerevan-2 (official matches); Artsakh FC (official matches)

Website
- Dzoraghbyur Training Centre

Dzoraghbyur Training Centre, is the training ground and academy base of the Armenian football club FC Ararat Yerevan.

== Overview ==
Dzoraghbyur Training Centre was opened in 2007 on the grounds of the former Dzoraghbyur Sports Complex in the Dzoraghbyur village of Kotayk Province, 12 km east of the capital Yerevan.

The complex was acquired by FC Ararat Yerevan earlier in 2003. In 2004, a large-scale rehabilitation and modernization process was launched. US$2 million was allocated by the club for the reconstruction works. The first phase of the training centre was completed in 2007.

Occupying an area of 48,000 m^{2}, the centre is currently used for the club's youth and senior teams trainings. The directing managers of the youth teams are Mushegh Nikoyan And Maxim Arakelyan.

Major rehabilitation process was conducted during summer 2016, when new artificial turf was installed and the service building was entirely renovated.

== Facilities ==
With a total area of 48,000 m^{2}, the centre is home to the following facilities:

- 3 full-size natural grass pitches.
- 1 full-size artificial pitch, home to the Armenian First League side Ararat Yerevan-2; the reserve team of FC Ararat Yerevan.
- Indoor facilities housing a service centre with gymnasium.
