= Yerevan Football Academy Stadium =

Stadium in Yerevan, Armenia

FFA Technical Center-Academy Stadium ՀՖՖ Տեխնիկական-կենտրոն ակադեմիայի մարզադաշտ
- Avan Football Academy Stadium
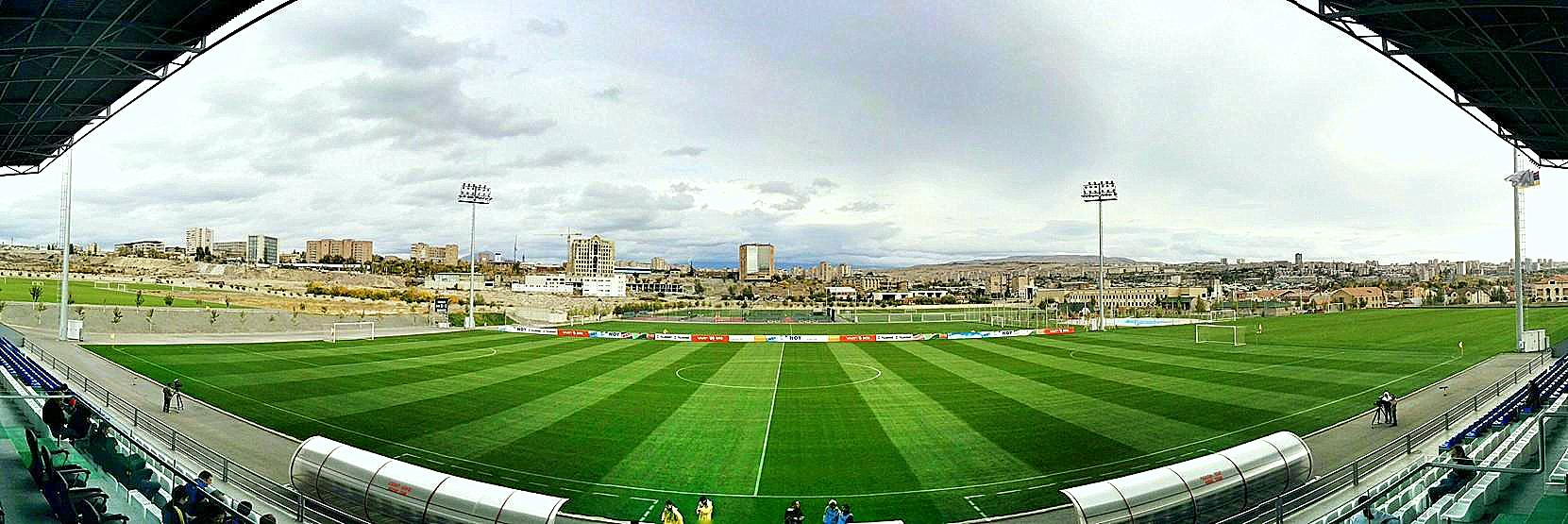
- General view of the Football Academy Stadium
- Interactive map of FFA Technical Center-Academy Stadium; ՀՖՖ Տեխնիկական-կենտրոն ակադեմիայի մարզադաշտ
- Full name: FFA Technical Center-Academy Stadium
- Location: Avan District; Yerevan, Armenia
- Coordinates: 40°13′16″N 44°33′19″E
- Owner: Football Federation of Armenia
- Capacity: 1,428
- Field size: 105 m × 68 m (344 ft × 223 ft)

Construction
- Opened: April 29, 2013

Tenants
- FC Pyunik (2013–2017); Ararat-Armenia (2017–present); Gandzasar (2018–present); Armenia women's national football team (2014–present)

Website
- www.footballacademy.am/en/

The Yerevan Football Academy Stadium, officially the FFA Technical Center-Academy Stadium (Armenian: ՀՖՖ Տեխնիկական-կենտրոն ակադեմիայի մարզադաշտ), commonly known as the Yerevan Football Academy Stadium or the Avan Academy Stadium, is an all-seater football stadium in Yerevan, Armenia. It is located in the northern Avan District of the city, within the Technical Center-Academy complex of the Football Federation of Armenia. The stadium is sometimes known as the Avan Football Academy Stadium.

== Overview ==
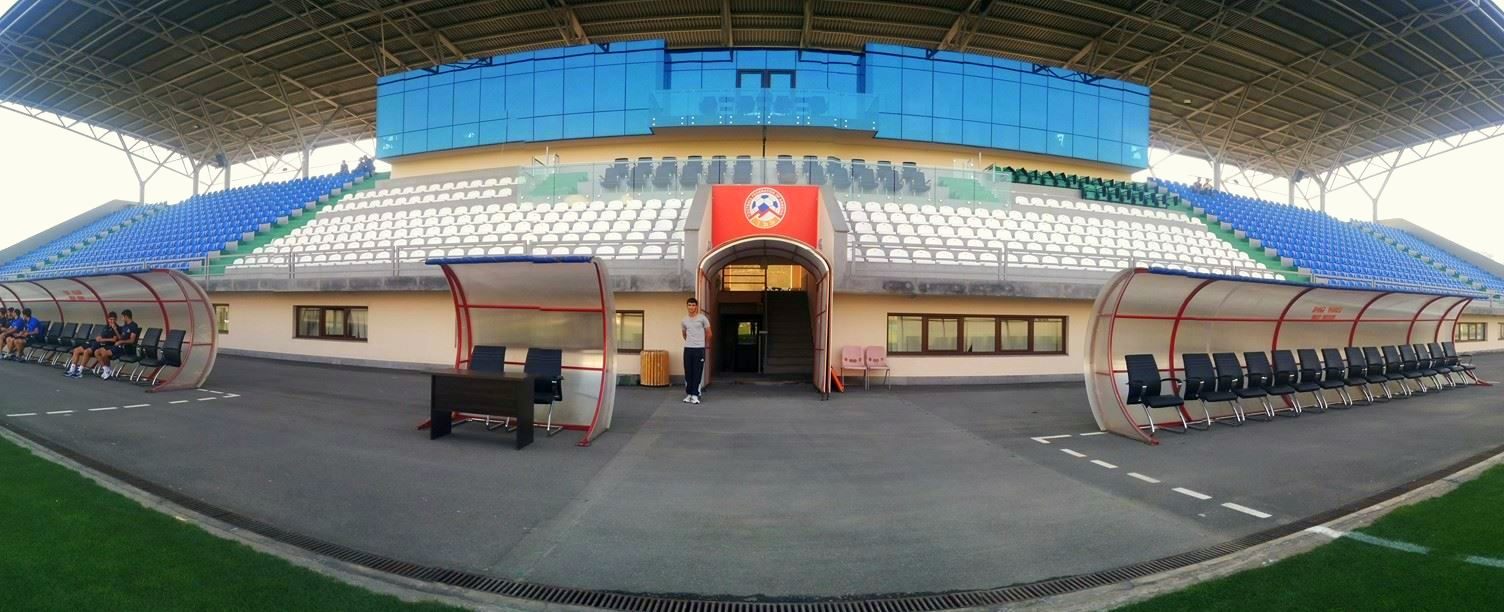
The main stand

The 1,428-seated stadium was officially opened on 29 April 2013 by the Mayor of Yerevan Taron Margaryan. However, the first official match in the stadium took place earlier on 13 April 2013, between FC Pyunik and FC Banants within the frames of the Armenian Premier League. The match ended up with a result of 4-0, in favour of Pyunik.

The stadium has served as the home venue of the Armenian Premier League side Pyunik between 2013 and 2017.

The stadium is part of the Technical Center-Academy of the Football Federation of Armenia which was officially opened on 1 September 2010 by the UEFA president Michel Platini. The centre is home to the main football stadium, 9 football training pitches (8 natural and 1 artificial), 4 outdoor tennis courts, an indoor sports hall, indoor and outdoor swimming pools, fitness centre and a 4-star hotel with 49 guest rooms.

== Gallery ==
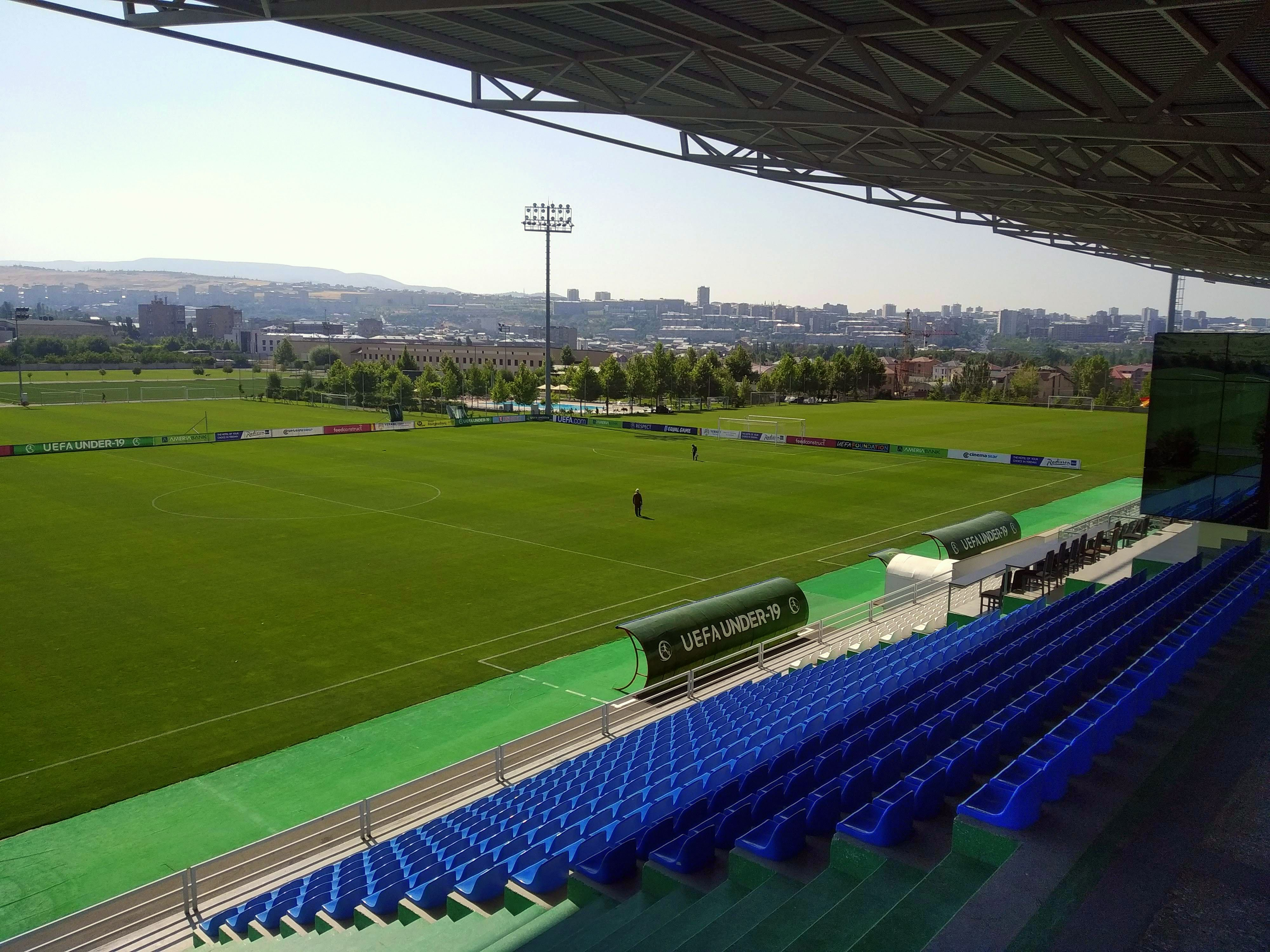

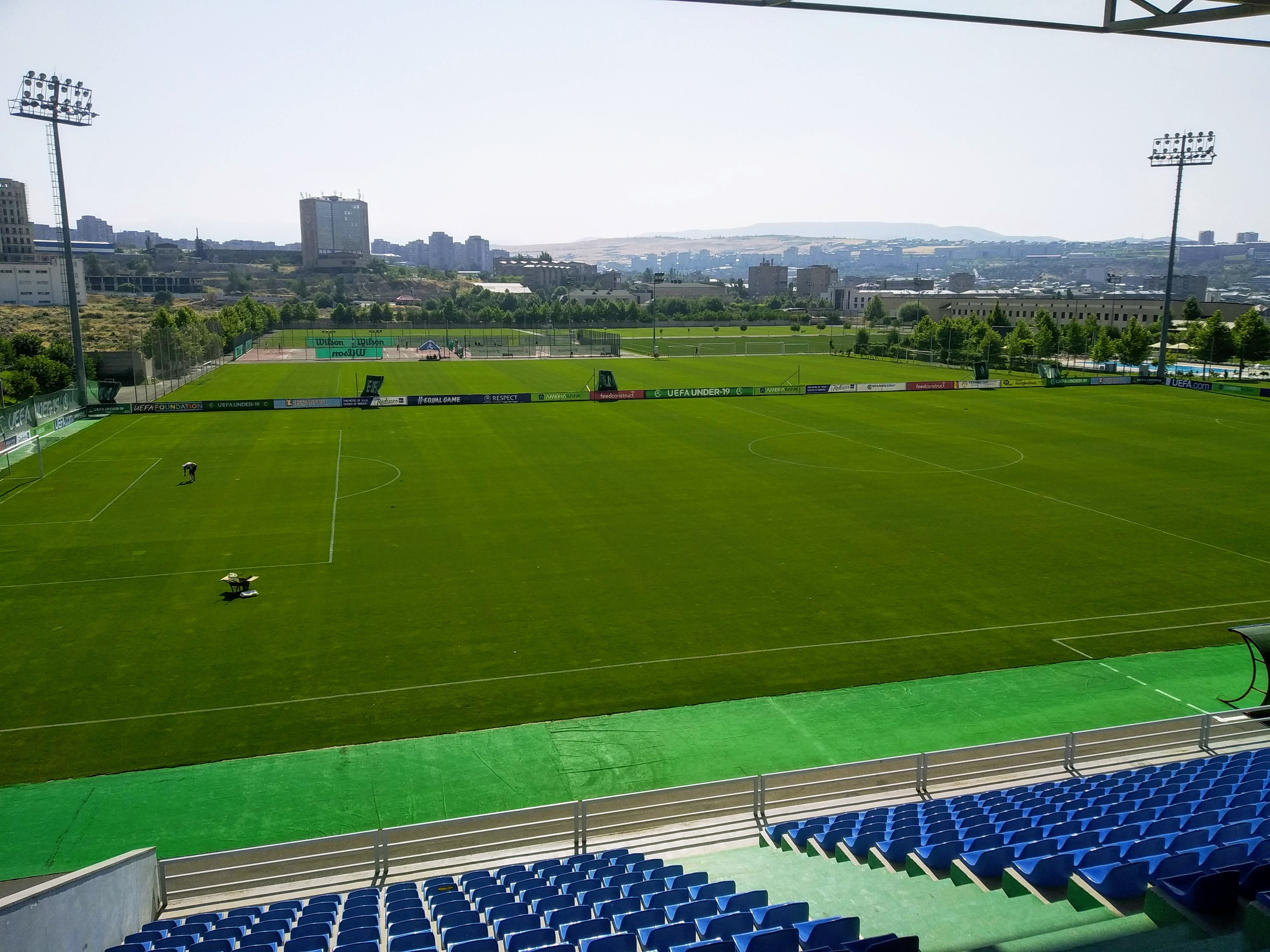

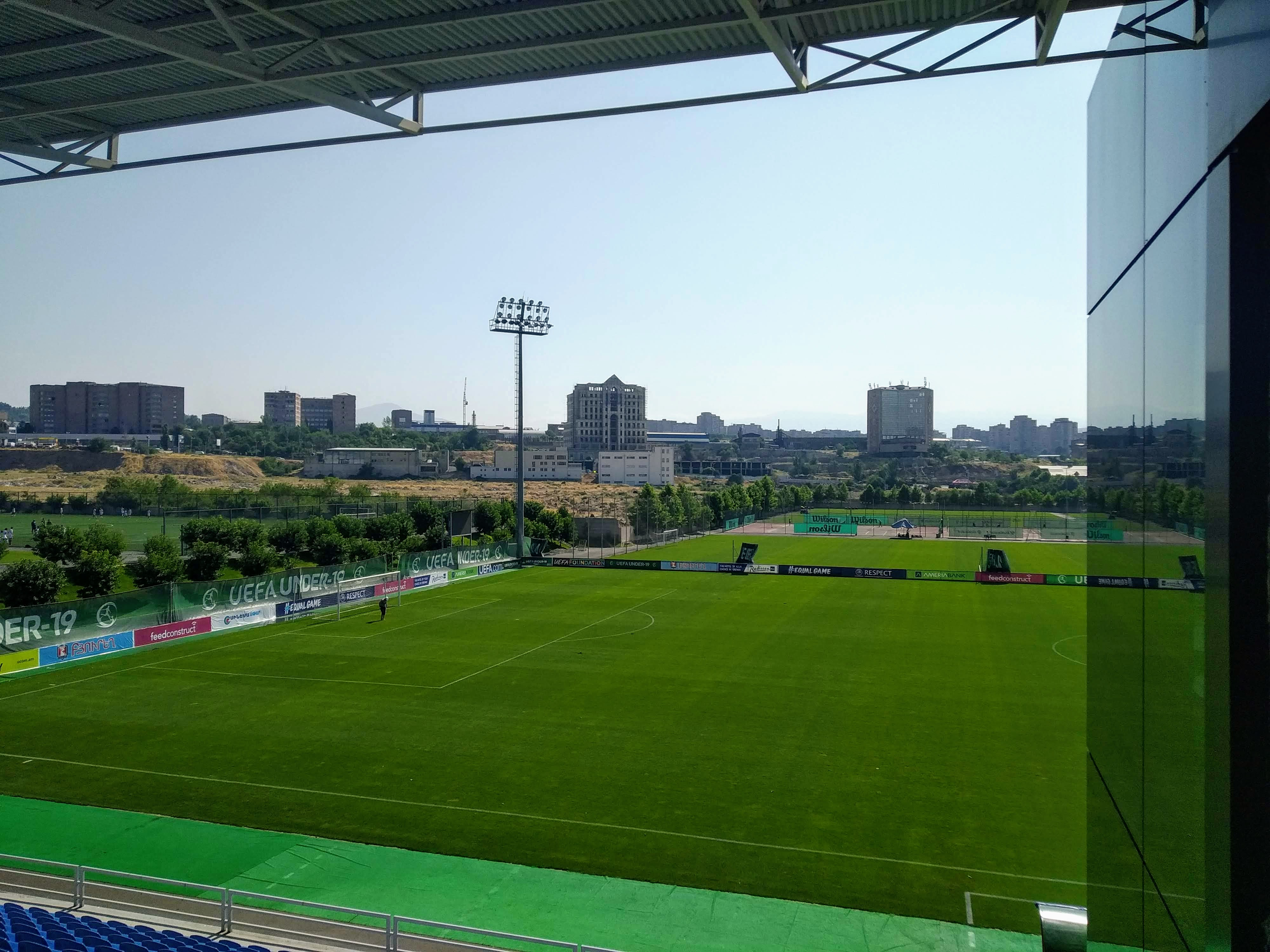
