= Ararat-Armenia – Noah rivalry =

Football rivalry in Armenia

Ararat-Armenia v Noah
- Other names: The black and whites derby
- Location: (Armenia) Yerevan
- Teams: Ararat-Armenia; Noah
- First meeting: 15 September 2018; Premier League; Artsakh 1–1 Ararat-Armenia
- Latest meeting: 10 May 2026; Premier League; Ararat-Armenia 0–4 Noah

Statistics
- Total meetings: 37
- Most wins: Ararat-Armenia (17)
- Most player appearances: Armen Ambartsumyan (28)
- Top scorer: Mailson Lima (5)
- All-time record: Ararat-Armenia: 17; Draw: 8 Noah: 12
- Largest victory: 25 August 2021; Premier League; Ararat-Armenia 5–2 Noah; 14 March 2022; Premier League; Noah 0–3 Ararat-Armenia; 9 September 2022; Premier League; Ararat-Armenia 3–0 Noah; 2 April 2023; Premier League; Ararat-Armenia 3–0 Noah
- Largest goal scoring: 10 July 2020; 2019–20 Final; Noah 5–5 Ararat-Armenia
- Longest win streak: 6 games Noah (2023–2025)
- Longest unbeaten streak: 8 games Ararat-Armenia (2018–20)
- Current win streak: Ararat-Armenia (1)
- Current unbeaten streak: 1

The Ararat-Armenia – Noah rivalry is a rivalry between Yerevan-based professional association football club Ararat-Armenia and Abovyan-based Noah. The match was first contested on 15 September 2018, with the game ending in a 1–1 draw.

== Head-to-head ==
Competition	Played	Ararat-Armenia	Draw	Noah	Ararat-Armenia goals	Noah goals
Premier League	30	16	5	9	50	33
Cup	5	1	2	2	9	11
Supercup	2	0	1	1	3	2
Total	37	17	8	12	62	46

== Results ==
=== League ===
15 September 2018 2018–19	Artsakh	1–1	Ararat-Armenia	Yerevan
14:00 (UTC+4)	H.Poghosyan 68'; Tupchiyenko (yellow card) 74'		Dimitrov 44'; Guz (yellow card) 62'; Kayron (yellow card) 77'	Stadium: Mika Stadium; Attendance: 400; Referee: Henrik Nalbandyan

24 November 2018 2018–19	Ararat-Armenia	3–1	Artsakh	Yerevan
15:00 (UTC+4)	Dimitrov 1', 17', 40'; Monsalvo (yellow card) 53'; Martínez (yellow card) 57'		Bakhtiyarov 23'; Minasyan (yellow card) 55'; H.Poghosyan (yellow card) 58'	Stadium: Republican Stadium; Attendance: 70; Referee: Artur Safaryan

11 April 2019 2018–19	Artsakh	1–3	Ararat-Armenia	Yerevan
15:00 (UTC+4)	A.Meliksetyan (yellow card) 30'; V.Avetisyan 39'		P.Avetisyan 9', 19'; Čupić (yellow card) 28'; Kobyalko 66'	Stadium: Pyunik Training Centre; Attendance: 200; Referee: Artur Safaryan

24 May 2019 2018–19	Ararat-Armenia	2–0	Artsakh	Yerevan
17:00 (UTC+4)	Kobyalko 7', 48' (pen.); Malakyan (yellow card) 80'; Khozin (yellow card) 88'		Avagyan (yellow card) 17'; Hovhannisyan (yellow card) 18'; V.Movsisyan (yellow card) 36'	Stadium: Yerevan Football Academy Stadium; Attendance: 500; Referee: Xavier Estrada Fernández

18 August 2019 2019–20	Noah	1–2	Ararat-Armenia	Yerevan
17:15 (UTC+4)	Tatayev (yellow card) 33'; Mayrovich 82'		Ambartsumyan 47'; Mailson 74'; Guz (yellow card) 82'	Stadium: Alashkert Stadium; Attendance: 400; Referee: Zaven Hovhannisyan
Note: Match played at the Alashkert Stadium in Yerevan, instead of Noah's regular Mika Stadium in Yerevan.

25 October 2019 2019–20	Ararat-Armenia	3–1	Noah	Yerevan
16:00 (UTC+4)	Guz 45'; Avetisyan (yellow card) 53'; Narsingh 78'; Kobyalko 90+3'		Mayrovich 80'; Bor (yellow card) 81'	Stadium: Yerevan Football Academy Stadium; Attendance: 450; Referee: Ashot Ghaltakchyan

15 June 2020 2019–20	Noah	1–1	Ararat-Armenia	Yerevan
17:30 (UTC+4)	Kovalenko 7' (yellow card) 90'; Spătaru (yellow card) 52'		Vakulenko 17'; Sanogo (yellow card) 34'; Malakyan (yellow card) 37'	Stadium: Alashkert Stadium; Attendance: 0 Referee: Ashot Ghaltakchyan
Note: Match played behind closed doors due to the COVID-19 pandemic.

14 July 2020 2019–20	Ararat-Armenia	2–0	Noah	Yerevan
17:30 (UTC+4)	Narsingh 16'; Otubanjo 45'; Damčevski (yellow card) 52'; Khachumyan (yellow card) 57'		Kryuchkov (yellow card) 35'; Spătaru (yellow card) 83'	Stadium: Yerevan Football Academy Stadium; Attendance: 0 Referee: Henrik Nalbandyan
Note: Match played behind closed doors due to the COVID-19 pandemic.

8 November 2020 2020–21	Noah	0–0	Ararat-Armenia	Yerevan
15:30 (UTC+4)	Manga (yellow card) 59'; Kryuchkov (yellow card) 90+1'		Danielyan (yellow card) 36'; Louis (yellow card) 54'	Stadium: FFA Academy Stadium; Attendance: 0 Referee: Zaven Hovhannisyan
Note: Match played behind closed doors due to the COVID-19 pandemic.

23 November 2020 2020–21	Ararat-Armenia	3–1	Noah	Yerevan
17:00 (UTC+4)	Bollo 8' (yellow card) 41'; Martínez 38' (yellow card) 88'; Ângelo (yellow card) 55'; Shahinyan 70'; Gouffran (yellow card) 74'; Mailson (yellow card) 90+4'		A.Oliveira 35'; S.Gomes (yellow card) 46'; Simonyan (yellow card) 61'; Spătaru (yellow card) 75'	Stadium: FFA Academy Stadium; Attendance: 0 Referee: Henrik Nalbandyan
Note: Match played behind closed doors due to the COVID-19 pandemic.

6 May 2021 2020–21	Ararat-Armenia	0–0	Noah	Yerevan
19:00 (UTC+4)	Ambartsumyan (yellow card) 38'; Terteryan (red card) 49'; Wbeymar (yellow card) 77'; Bueno (yellow card) 86'		Monroy (yellow card) 61'; Avetisyan (yellow card) 86'	Stadium: FFA Academy Stadium; Attendance: 800; Referee: Zaven Hovhannisyan

25 August 2021 2021–22	Ararat-Armenia	5–2	Noah	Yerevan
17:00 (UTC+4)	Lima 17', 49' (pen.) (yellow card) 66'; Alemão (yellow card) 32'; Otubanjo (yellow card) 52' (goal) 59'; Narsingh (yellow card) 55'; Eza 85'; Shaghoyan 88' (yellow card) 90'		Karapetyan 10'; Gyasi 41'; S.Gomes (yellow card) 45'; Dedechko (yellow card) 66'; Velemir (yellow card) 85'	Stadium: FFA Academy Stadium; Attendance: 400; Referee: Artem Gasparyan

19 November 2021 2021–22	Noah	0–1	Ararat-Armenia	Yerevan
16:00 (UTC+4)	Gabarayev (yellow card) 80'		Lima 69'; Terteryan (yellow card) 85'	Stadium: FFA Academy Stadium; Attendance: 500; Referee: Zaven Hovhannisyan

14 March 2022 2021–22	Noah	0–3	Ararat-Armenia	Armavir
15:00 (UTC+4)	Spătaru (yellow card) 50'; Monroy (yellow card) 69'		Wbeymar (yellow card) 27'; Duarte 42'; Lima 58'; Sanogo 75'; Udo (yellow card) 82'	Stadium: Armavir City Stadium; Referee: Zaven Hovhannisyan

9 May 2022 2021–22	Ararat-Armenia	0–1	Noah	Yerevan
19:30 (UTC+4)	Udo (yellow card) 90+2'		Lavrishchev 3'; Shahinyan (yellow card) 7'; A.Oliveira (yellow card) 50'; Shahatuni (yellow card) 90+4'; Matviyenko (yellow card) 90+7'	Stadium: FFA Academy Stadium; Referee: Shahen Aghayan

9 September 2022 2022–23	Ararat-Armenia	3–0	Noah	Yerevan
18:00 (UTC+4)	Agdon 18'; Udo (yellow card) 37'; Romércio 63'; Firmino 72'			Stadium: FFA Stadium; Referee: Henrik Nalbandian

13 November 2022 2022–23	Noah	1–2	Ararat-Armenia	Armavir
14:00 (UTC+4)	Salou 29'; Baghramyan (yellow card) 49'; Avetisyan (yellow card) 88'; Adams (yellow card) 90'		Firmino 17'; Yenne 28'; Tera (yellow card) 62'	Stadium: Armavir City Stadium; Referee: Artem Gasparyan

2 April 2023 2022–23	Ararat-Armenia	3–0	Noah	Yerevan
16:00 (UTC+4)	Eza 13', 41'; Serobyan 59'; Nondi (yellow card) 61'			Stadium: FFA Stadium; Referee: Artem Gasparyan

27 May 2023 2022–23	Noah	2–1	Ararat-Armenia	Abovyan
20:00 (UTC+4)	Vardanyan 23'; Danielyan (yellow card) 24'; Muradyan (yellow card) 33'; Igbokwe 67'; Bălbărău (yellow card) 90+3'; Ebenezer (yellow card) 90+7'; Melkonyan (yellow card) 90+7'		Nondi (yellow card) 17'; Serobyan 30' (pen.); Grigoryan (yellow card) 70'	Stadium: Abovyan City Stadium; Referee: Ashot Ghaltakhchyan

15 September 2023 2023–24	Ararat-Armenia	4–3	Noah	Yerevan
19:00 (UTC+4)	Yattara 12', 40' (yellow card) 54'; Castanheira 45+1', 70'; Yenne (yellow card) 54' da Silva (yellow card) 75'; Ermakov (yellow card) 90+3'; Nondi (yellow card) 90+7'		Miljković (yellow card) 34'; Varela 51'; Gladon 67'; Muradyan 86'	Stadium: FFA Stadium; Referee: Henrik Nalbandian

7 November 2023 2023–24	Noah	1–0	Ararat-Armenia	Abovyan
18:00 (UTC+4)	Movsesyan 18' (yellow card) 77'; Gladon (yellow card) 37'; Muradyan (yellow card) 40'		Muradyan (yellow card) 50'; Nondi (yellow card) 55' (yellow-red card) 72'; Grigoryan (yellow card) 86'; Tera (yellow card) 90'; Castanheira (yellow card) 90'	Stadium: City Stadium; Referee: Henrik Nalbandian

15 March 2024 2023–24	Ararat-Armenia	0–1	Noah	Yerevan
19:00 (UTC+4)	Hovhannisyan (yellow card) 33'; Scheid (yellow card) 57'; Yenne (yellow card) 80'; Alemão (yellow card) 89'; Yattara (yellow card) 90+5'		Gamboš (yellow card) 30'; Mathieu (yellow card) 70'; Gladon 77'; S. Muradyan (yellow card) 82'; Movsesyan (yellow card) 84'; Minasyan (yellow card) 90+3'; Čančarević (yellow card) 90+5'	Stadium: FFA Stadium; Referee: Henrik Nalbandian

16 May 2024 2023–24	Noah	2–1	Ararat-Armenia	Abovyan
20:00 (UTC+4)	Alhaft 27'; Mathieu 43'		Ambartsumyan (red card) 40'; Yattara 57'; Castanheira (yellow card) 79'	Stadium: City Stadium; Referee: Ashot Ghaltakhchyan

28 October 2024 2024–25	Ararat-Armenia	0–1	Noah	Yerevan
19:00 (UTC+4)	K.Muradyan (yellow card) 14'; Ambartsumyan (yellow card) 90+2'; Duarte (yellow card) 90+2'		Ferreira 13'; Manvelyan (yellow card) 44'; Hambardzumyan (yellow card) 68'; Oulad Omar (yellow card) 88'; Pablo (yellow card) 90' (yellow-red card) 90'; S.Muradyan (yellow card) 90+1'	Stadium: FFA Stadium; Referee: Henrik Nalbandian

4 December 2024 2024–25	Noah	2–1	Ararat-Armenia	Abovyan
18:00 (UTC+4)	Bueno 8' (o.g.); Ferreira (red card) 18'; Pinson (yellow card) 23'; Oulad Omar 45+10'; Sangaré (yellow card) 47'; Hambardzumyan (yellow card) 79'; Čančarević (yellow card) 90+1'		Nondi (yellow card) 16'; Yenne 36'; Ocansey (yellow card) 42'; Bueno (yellow card) 50' (yellow-red card) 90+11'; Queirós (yellow card) 57'; Duarte (yellow card) 72'; Rodríguez (yellow card) 90'	Stadium: City Stadium; Referee: Henrik Nalbandian

24 May 2025 2024–25	Noah	2–0	Ararat-Armenia	Abovyan
19:00 (UTC+4)	Muradyan 26'; Pinson (yellow card) 42' (goal) 49'; Hambardzumyan (yellow card) 53'; Ferreira (yellow card) 64'; Sangaré (yellow card) 90+2'		Queirós (yellow card) 36'; Yenne (yellow card) 55'	Stadium: City Stadium; Referee: Sargis Khachatryan

20 September 2025 2025–26	Ararat-Armenia	2–2	Noah	Yerevan
18:00 (UTC+4)	Welton (red card) 5'; Oliveira 32'; Grigoryan (yellow card) 34'; Serobyan 77' (yellow card) 82'; Gbomadu (yellow card) 90+7'		Mulahusejnović 22', 51'; Manvelyan (yellow card) 45+4'; Jakoliš (yellow card) 45+6' (yellow-red card) 68'; Sualehe (yellow card) 82'; Oshima (yellow card) 83'; Pinson (red card) 87'; Čančarević (yellow card) 88'	Stadium: Yerevan Football Academy Stadium; Referee: Henrik Nalbandian

1 November 2025 2025–26	Noah	1–2	Ararat-Armenia	Abovyan
19:00 (UTC+4)	Ferreira (yellow card) 47' (goal) 48'; Muradyan (yellow card) 66'; Mulahusejnović (yellow card) 81'; Sangaré (yellow card) 85'		Shaghoyan 21'; Queirós (yellow card) 47'; Eloyan (yellow card) 56'; Bueno (yellow card) 80'; Ambartsumyan 86'; Lima (yellow card) 89'; Balanta (yellow card) 90+1'; Welton (yellow card) 90+4'	Stadium: Vahagn Tumasyan Stadium; Referee: Ashot Harutyunyan

10 May 2026 2025–26	Ararat-Armenia	0–4	Noah	Abovyan
18:00 (UTC+4)	Serobyan (yellow card) 24'		Mulahusejnović 13'; Ferreira 18'; Aiás 85', 90+2'	Stadium: Vahagn Tumasyan Stadium; Referee: Ashot Ghaltakhchyan

26 October 2026 2026–27	Ararat-Armenia	2–1	Noah	Abovyan
19:00 (UTC+4)	Lima 9'; Shaghoyan 22'; Wilson (yellow card) 57'; França (yellow card) 90+6'		Khamoyan (yellow card) 40'; Boakye (yellow card) 47'; Sualehe (yellow card) 54'; Hambardzumyan (yellow card) 60'; Saintini (yellow card) 70' (red card) 90'; Lazetić 80'	Stadium: Vahagn Tumasyan Stadium; Referee: Henrik Nalbandian

=== Cup ===
10 July 2020 2019–20; Final	Noah	5–5 (a.e.t.) (7 – 6 p)	Ararat-Armenia	Yerevan
19:00 (UTC+4)	Mayrovich 39', 60'; Kryuchkov (yellow card) 49'; Azarov 56' (pen.), 115' (pen.); Spătaru 67'; Kovalenko (yellow card) 106'; V.Movsisyan (yellow card) 113'		Louis 8', 40'; Tatayev 23' (o.g.); Otubanjo 29', 117'; Achenteh (yellow card) 55'; Kobyalko (yellow card) 89'; Kódjo (red card) 90+3'; Čupić (yellow card) 122'	Stadium: FFA Academy Stadium; Attendance: 0 Referee: Zaven Hovhannisyan
	Penalties
	Bor (penalty missed); Azarov (penalty scored); Avetisyan (penalty missed); Gareginyan (penalty scored); Dmitriev (penalty scored); Kovalenko (penalty scored); Grigoryan (penalty scored); Kryuchkov (penalty scored); Krusnauskas (penalty scored)		(penalty missed) Nahapetyan; (penalty scored) Kobyalko; (penalty scored) Ângelo; (penalty missed) Malakyan; (penalty scored) Otubanjo; (penalty scored) Sanogo; (penalty scored) Christian; (penalty scored) Guz; (penalty missed) Danielyan
Note: Match played behind closed doors due to the COVID-19 pandemic.

11 March 2024 2023–24; Quarterfinal	Noah	2–3	Ararat-Armenia	Abovyan
18:00 (UTC+4)	Miranyan 13' (pen.); Mathieu (yellow card) 16'; Gamboš (yellow card) 46'; Alhaft 90'		Tera (yellow card) 30'; Rodríguez 37'; Duarte 62'; Serobyan 82' (pen.); Shishkovski (yellow card) 90+2'	Stadium: City Stadium; Referee: Zaven Hovhannisyan

13 May 2025 2024–25; Final	Noah	3–1	Ararat-Armenia	Yerevan
19:00 (UTC+4)	Pinson (yellow card) 37'; Ferreira 40', 57'; Aiás 87'; Eteki (yellow card) 88'; Čančarević (yellow card) 90+4'		Tera (yellow card) 12'; Bueno (yellow card) 37' (yellow-red card) 90+6'; Noubissi 44'	Stadium: Republican Stadium; Referee: Ashot Harutyunyan

16 April 2026 2025–26; Semifinal	Ararat-Armenia	0–1	Noah	Abovyan
18:30 (UTC+4)	Hovhannisyan (red card) 73'; Malis (yellow card) 73'; Queirós (yellow card) 90'		Mulahusejnović 25' (yellow card) 51'; Saintini (red card) 73'; Sangaré (yellow card) 73'; Oshima (yellow card) 88'; Coneglian (yellow card) 90+5'; Hambardzumyan (yellow card) 90+10'	Stadium: Vahagn Tumasyan Stadium; Referee: Vardan Manukyan

29 April 2026 2025–26; Semifinal	Noah	0–0	Ararat-Armenia	Abovyan
18:30 (UTC+4)	Zolotić (yellow card) 51'; Coneglian (yellow card) 80'; Khamoyan (yellow card) 84'		Bueno (yellow card) 45'	Stadium: Vahagn Tumasyan Stadium; Referee: Zaven Yohannya

=== Supercup ===
9 August 2020	Noah	2–1 (a.e.t.)	Ararat-Armenia	Yerevan
19:00 (UTC+4)	Kovalenko (yellow card) 14'; Emsis (yellow card) 22'; Dedechko (yellow card) 57' (goal) 99' (pen.); Lavrishchev 90'; Manga (yellow card) 91'; Vimercati (yellow card) 108'; Gareginyan (yellow card) 114'		Mailson 60'; Bollo (red card) 115'; Gouffran (yellow card) 120'	Stadium: Football Academy Stadium; Attendance: 0 Referee: Ashot Ghaltakchyan

12 March 2026	Noah	1–1 (a.e.t.) (4–2 p)	Ararat-Armenia	Yerevan
19:00 (UTC+4)	Ferreira 37' (pen.)		Banjaqui 10'; Muradyan (yellow card) 38'; Ndour (yellow card) 71'; Bueno (yellow card) 80'	Stadium: Republican Stadium; Referee: Zaven Hovhannisyan
	Penalties
	Ferreira (penalty scored); Manvelyan (penalty scored); Jakoliš (penalty scored); Mulahusejnović (penalty scored)		(penalty scored) Oliveira; (penalty scored) Ayongo; (penalty missed) Eloyan; (penalty missed) Shaghoyan

== Player Statistics ==
=== Played for both clubs ===
Ararat-Armenia, then Noah

Player	Pos.	Ararat-Armenia	Noah
(Armenia) Armen Nahapetyan	MF	2017–2023	2022–2023
(Armenia) Hovhannes Harutyunyan	MF	2017–2018, 2019–2021, 2024–2025	2025–Present
(Armenia) Artur Daniyelyan	DF	2018–2021	2022–2024
(Armenia) Artyom Avanesyan	MF	2018–2024	2024–Present
(Armenia) Petros Avetisyan	MF	2019–2020, 2024	2021–2022
(Armenia) Vardan Shahatuni	GK	2020–2022	2022
(Armenia) Sargis Shahinyan	MF	2020–2022	2021–2022
(Armenia) Aleksandr Karapetyan	FW	2021	2021

Noah, then Ararat-Armenia

Player	Pos.	Noah	Ararat-Armenia
(Ivory Coast) Wilfried Eza	FW	2019	2021–2023
(Italy) Valerio Vimercati	GK	2019–2021, 2023–2024	2021–2022
(Armenia) Edgar Grigoryan	DF	2019–2020	2023–Present
(Moldova) Dan Spătaru	MF	2020, 2022	2021

=== Appearances & Goals ===
As of match played 26 October 2026

	Name	Club	Years	League apps	League goals	Cup apps	Cup goals	Supercup apps	Supercup goals	Total apps	Total goals	Ratio
1	(Russia) Armen Ambartsumyan	Ararat-Armenia	2018–Present	23	2	4	0	2	0	29	2	0.07
2	(Armenia) Karen Muradyan	Ararat-Armenia	2021–Present	17	0	4	0	1	0	22	0	0
3	(Armenia) Edgar Grigoryan	Noah; Ararat-Armenia	2019–2020; 2023–Present	1; 12	0; 0	1; 4	0; 0	0; 1	0; 0	19	0	0
3	(Armenia) Junior Bueno	Ararat-Armenia	2021–Present	14	0	4	0	1	0	19	0	0
5	(Armenia) Artur Daniyelyan	Ararat-Armenia; Noah	2018–2021; 2022–2024	11; 5	0; 0	1; 0	0; 0	1; 0	0; 0	18	0	0
5	(Kenya) Alwyn Tera	Ararat-Armenia	2021–Present	14	0	3	0	1	0	18	0	0
7	(Brazil) Alemão	Ararat-Armenia	2020–2024	13	0	1	0	1	0	15	0	0
8	(Armenia) Artyom Avanesyan	Ararat-Armenia; Noah	2018–2024; 2024–2026	11; 2	0; 0	0; 0	0; 0	0; 1	0; 0	14	0	0
8	(Armenia) Sergey Muradyan	Noah	2023–Present	11	2	2	0	1	0	14	2	0.14
8	(Armenia) Gor Manvelyan	Noah	2023–Present	10	0	3	0	1	0	14	0	0
11	(Italy) Valerio Vimercati	Noah; Ararat-Armenia	2019–2021, 2023–2024; 2021–2022	7; 4	0; 0	1; 0	1; 0	0; 0	0; 0	13	0	0
11	(Nigeria) Tenton Yenne	Ararat-Armenia	2022–2025	11	2	2	0	0	0	13	2	0.15
11	(Armenia) Zhirayr Shaghoyan	Ararat-Armenia	2017–Present	9	3	3	0	1	0	13	3	0.23
11	(Armenia) Hovhannes Hambardzumyan	Noah	2023–Present	8	0	4	0	1	0	13	0	0
15	(Cape Verde) Mailson Lima	Ararat-Armenia	2019–2021, 2021–2023	10	5	1	0	1	1	12	6	0.5
15	(Burkina Faso) Zakaria Sanogo	Ararat-Armenia	2019–2022	10	1	1	0	1	0	12	1	0.08
15	(Armenia) Kamo Hovhannisyan	Ararat-Armenia	2024–Present	8	0	3	0	1	0	12	0	0
15	(Armenia) Artur Serobyan	Ararat-Armenia	2020–Present	8	3	3	1	1	0	12	5	0.42
19	(Colombia) Jonathan Duarte	Ararat-Armenia	2022–2026	9	1	2	1	0	0	11	2	0.18
20	(Armenia) Benik Hovhannisyan	Noah	2019–2022	9	0	0	0	1	0	10	0	0
20	(Netherlands) Furdjel Narsingh	Ararat-Armenia	2019–2022	9	2	1	0	0	0	10	2	0.2
20	(Ukraine) Serhiy Vakulenko	Ararat-Armenia	2020–2022	8	1	1	0	1	0	10	1	0.1
20	(Moldova) Dan Spătaru	Noah; Ararat-Armenia	2020, 2022; 2021	6; 2	0; 0	1; 0	1; 0	1; 0	0; 0	10	1	0.1
20	(Kenya) Amos Nondi	Ararat-Armenia	2023–2025	9	0	1	0	0	0	10	0	0
20	(Portugal) Hélder Ferreira	Noah	2024–Present	6	3	3	2	1	1	10	6	0.6
26	(Russia) Maksim Mayrovich	Noah	2019–2021, 2021–2022	8	2	1	2	0	0	9	4	0.44
26	(Ivory Coast) Wilfried Eza	Noah; Ararat-Armenia	2019; 2021–2023	2; 7	1; 2	0; 0	0; 0	0; 0	0	9	3	0.33
26	(Russia) Dmitri Lavrishchev	Noah	2019–2020, 2022	7	1	1	0	1	1	9	2	0.22
26	(Nigeria) Yusuf Otubanjo	Ararat-Armenia	2020–2022	7	2	1	2	1	0	9	4	0.44
26	(Portugal) João Queirós	Ararat-Armenia	2024–2026	6	0	2	0	1	0	9	0	0
26	(Burkina Faso) Gustavo Sangaré	Noah	2024–Present	6	0	2	0	1	0	9	0	0
32	(Russia) Dmitry Guz	Ararat-Armenia	2018–2020	7	1	1	0	0	0	8	1	0.13
32	(Armenia) Yuri Gareginyan	Noah	2018–2021	6	0	1	0	1	0	8	0	0
32	(Armenia) Edgar Movsesyan	Noah	2019–2020, 2023–2024	7	1	1	0	0	0	8	1	0.13
32	(Armenia) Jordy Monroy	Noah	2020–2022	7	0	0	0	1	0	8	0	0
32	(Cameroon) Yan Eteki	Noah	2024–Present	5	0	2	0	1	0	8	0	0
37	(Russia) Anton Kobyalko	Ararat-Armenia	2018–2020	6	4	1	0	0	0	7	4	0.57
37	(Armenia) Armen Nahapetyan	Ararat-Armenia; Noah	2017–2023; 2022–2023	5; 1	0; 0	1; 0	0; 0	0; 0	0; 0	7	0	0
37	(Haiti) Alex Junior Christian	Ararat-Armenia	2019–2021	5	0	1	0	1	0	7	0	0
37	(Russia) Dmitry Abakumov	Ararat-Armenia	2018–2023	7	0	0	0	0	0	7	0	0
37	(Nigeria) Ogana Louis	Ararat-Armenia	2019–2021	5	0	1	2	1	0	7	2	0.29
37	(Russia) Vladislav Kryuchkov	Noah	2019–2021	5	0	1	0	1	0	7	0	0
37	(Portugal) Ângelo Meneses	Ararat-Armenia	2019–2021	5	0	1	0	1	0	7	0	0
37	(Russia) Mikhail Kovalenko	Noah	2019–2021	5	1	1	0	1	0	7	1	0.14
37	(Russia) Kirill Bor	Noah	2019–2021	5	0	1	0	1	0	7	0	0
37	(France) Yoan Gouffran	Ararat-Armenia	2020–2021	6	0	0	0	1	0	7	0	0
37	(Guinea-Bissau) Saná Gomes	Noah	2020–2022	6	0	0	0	1	0	7	0	0
37	(Armenia) Wbeymar Angulo	Ararat-Armenia	2020–2024	7	0	0	0	0	0	7	0	0
37	(Serbia) Aleksandar Miljković	Noah	2023–2025	5	0	2	0	0	0	7	0	0
37	(Nigeria) Matthew Gbomadu	Ararat-Armenia	2023–2026	6	0	1	0	0	0	7	0	0
37	(Portugal) Hugo Oliveira	Ararat-Armenia	2025–Present	4	1	2	0	1	0	7	1	0.14
37	(Armenia) Arayik Eloyan	Ararat-Armenia	2022–Present	4	0	2	0	1	0	7	0	0
37	(Ghana) Eric Boakye	Noah	2025–Present	4	0	2	0	1	0	7	0	0
37	(Croatia) Marin Jakoliš	Noah	2025–Present	4	0	2	0	1	0	7	0	0
37	(Portugal) David Sualehe	Noah	2025–Present	4	0	2	0	1	0	7	0	0
56	(Armenia) Gor Malakyan	Ararat-Armenia	2018–2020	5	0	1	0	0	0	6	0	0
56	(North Macedonia) Aleksandar Damchevski	Ararat-Armenia	2018–2021	5	0	0	0	1	0	6	0	0
56	(Armenia) Petros Avetisyan	Ararat-Armenia; Noah	2019–2020, 2024; 2021–2022	4; 2	2; 0	0; 0	0; 0	0; 0	0; 0	6	2	0.33
56	(Serbia) Stefan Čupić	Ararat-Armenia	2019–2021	4	0	1	0	1	0	6	0	0
56	(Russia) Alan Tatayev	Noah	2019–2021	5	0	1	0	0	0	6	0	0
56	(Russia) Vladimir Azarov	Noah	2019–2021	5	0	1	2	0	0	6	2	0.33
56	(Russia) Pavel Deobald	Noah	2019–2021	4	0	1	0	1	0	6	0	0
56	(Guinea-Bissau) Helistano Manga	Noah	2020–2021	4	0	1	0	1	0	6	0	0
56	(Armenia) Sargis Shahinyan	Ararat-Armenia; Noah	2020–2022; 2021–2022	3; 2	1; 0	0; 0	0; 0	1; 0	0; 0	6	1	0.17
56	(Armenia) Hovhannes Harutyunyan	Ararat-Armenia; Noah	2017–2018, 2019–2021, 2024–2025; 2025–2026	3; 1	0; 0	1; 0	0; 0	1; 0	0; 0	6	0	0
56	(Portugal) Alex Oliveira	Noah	2020–2021	6	1	0	0	0	0	6	1	0.17
56	(Armenia) Solomon Udo	Ararat-Armenia	2022–2023	6	0	0	0	0	0	6	0	0
56	(Slovakia) Martin Gamboš	Noah	2023–2025	5	0	1	0	0	0	6	0	0
56	(France) Virgile Pinson	Noah	2024–2026	4	1	2	0	0	0	6	1	0.17
56	(Armenia) Ognjen Čančarević	Noah	2024–2026	5	0	1	0	0	0	6	0	0
56	(Brazil) Matheus Aiás	Noah	2024–2026	4	2	2	1	0	0	6	3	0.5
56	(Portugal) Gonçalo Silva	Noah	2024–2026	4	0	2	0	0	0	6	0	0
56	(Bosnia and Herzegovina) Nermin Zolotić	Noah	2025–2026	3	0	3	0	0	0	6	0	0
56	(Japan) Takuto Oshima	Noah	2025–Present	3	0	2	0	1	0	6	0	0
56	(Bosnia and Herzegovina) Nardin Mulahusejnović	Noah	2025–2026	3	3	2	0	1	0	6	3	0.5
56	(Guadeloupe) Nathanaël Saintini	Noah	2025–Present	4	0	1	0	1	0	6	0	0
56	(Greece) Alexandros Malis	Ararat-Armenia	2025–Present	4	0	2	0	0	0	6	0	0
78	(Latvia) Eduards Emsis	Noah	2020–2021	3	0	1	0	1	0	5	0	0
78	(Ukraine) Denys Dedechko	Noah	2020–2022	4	0	0	0	1	1	5	0	0.2
78	(Armenia) Davit Terteryan	Ararat-Armenia	2021–2024	5	0	0	0	0	0	5	0	0
78	(Ghana) Raymond Gyasi	Noah	2021–2022	5	1	0	0	0	0	5	1	0.2
78	(Russia) Vsevolod Ermakov	Ararat-Armenia	2022–2024	5	0	0	0	0	0	5	0	0
78	(Netherlands) Justin Mathieu	Noah	2023–2024	4	1	1	0	0	0	5	1	0.2
78	(Armenia) Artur Miranyan	Noah	2023–2024	4	0	1	1	0	0	5	1	0.2
78	(Netherlands) Ilias Alhaft	Noah	2023–2024	4	1	1	1	0	0	5	2	0.4
78	(Portugal) Martim Maia	Noah	2023–2024	4	0	1	0	0	0	5	0	0
78	(Netherlands) Imran Oulad Omar	Noah	2024–Present	3	1	2	0	0	0	5	1	0.2
78	(Brazil) Welton	Ararat-Armenia	2025–2026	3	0	2	0	0	0	5	0	0
78	(Ghana) Paul Ayongo	Ararat-Armenia	2025–Present	2	0	2	0	1	0	5	0	0
90	(Armenia) Hovhannes Nazaryan	Noah	2018–2020	4	0	0	0	0	0	4	0	0
90	(Armenia) Artur Grigoryan	Noah	2018–2019	4	0	0	0	0	0	4	0	0
90	(Armenia) Arman Meliksetyan	Noah	2018–2019	4	0	0	0	0	0	4	0	0
90	(Armenia) Vigen Avetisyan	Noah	2019–2020	3	1	1	0	0	0	4	1	0.25
90	(Ivory Coast) Kódjo	Ararat-Armenia	2019–2020	2	0	1	0	1	0	4	0	0
90	(Armenia) Albert Khachumyan	Ararat-Armenia	2019–2024	4	0	0	0	0	0	4	0	0
90	(Burkina Faso) Dramane Salou	Noah	2022	4	1	0	0	0	0	4	1	0.25
90	(Belarus) Ayk Musakhanyan	Noah	2022–2023	4	0	0	0	0	0	4	0	0
90	(Nigeria) Okezie Ebenezer	Noah	2022–2023	4	0	0	0	0	0	4	0	0
90	(Armenia) Levon Vardanyan	Noah	2022–2023	4	1	0	0	0	0	4	1	0.25
90	(Nigeria) Haggai Katoh	Noah	2023–2024	4	0	0	0	0	0	4	0	0
90	(Brazil) Cássio Scheid	Ararat-Armenia	2023–2024	3	0	1	0	0	0	4	0	0
90	(Netherlands) Paul Gladon	Noah	2023–2024	3	2	1	0	0	0	4	2	0.5
90	(Portugal) Adriano Castanheira	Ararat-Armenia	2023–2024	4	2	0	0	0	0	4	2	0.5
90	(Guinea) Mohamed Yattara	Ararat-Armenia	2023–2024	4	3	0	0	0	0	4	3	0.75
90	(Cameroon) Marius Noubissi	Ararat-Armenia	2024–2025	3	0	1	1	0	0	4	1	0.25
90	(Armenia) Artak Dashyan	Noah	2024–Present	4	0	0	0	0	0	4	0	0
90	(Guinea) Zidane Banjaqui	Ararat-Armenia	2026–Present	1	0	2	0	1	1	4	1	0.25
90	(Senegal) Alioune Ndour	Ararat-Armenia	2026–Present	1	0	2	0	1	0	4	0	0
90	(Colombia) Juan Balanta	Ararat-Armenia	2025–Present	3	0	1	0	0	0	4	0	0
90	(Brazil) Arthur Coneglian	Ararat-Armenia	2024–Present	2	0	2	0	0	0	4	0	0
111	(Russia) Aleksey Pustozyorov	Ararat-Armenia	2018–2019	3	0	0	0	0	0	3	0	0
111	(Armenia) Argishti Petrosyan	Noah	2018–2019	3	0	0	0	0	0	3	0	0
111	(Armenia) Vahagn Minasyan	Noah	2018–2019	3	0	0	0	0	0	3	0	0
111	(Russia) Vladimir Khozin	Ararat-Armenia	2018–2019	3	0	0	0	0	0	3	0	0
111	(Spain) Sergi González	Ararat-Armenia	2018–2019	3	0	0	0	0	0	3	0	0
111	(Colombia) Giovanny Martínez	Ararat-Armenia	2018–2019	3	0	0	0	0	0	3	0	0
111	(Armenia) Eduard Avagyan	Noah	2018–2019	3	0	0	0	0	0	3	0	0
111	(Armenia) Karen Harutyunyan	Noah	2018–2020	3	0	0	0	0	0	3	0	0
111	(Russia) Soslan Kagermazov	Noah	2019–2020	3	0	0	0	0	0	3	0	0
111	(Lithuania) Rokas Krusnauskas	Noah	2020	2	0	1	0	0	0	3	0	0
111	(Estonia) Ilja Antonov	Ararat-Armenia	2019–2020	3	0	0	0	0	0	3	0	0
111	(Spain) David Bollo	Ararat-Armenia	2020–2021	2	1	0	0	1	0	3	1	0.33
111	(Russia) Artyom Simonyan	Noah	2020	2	0	0	0	1	0	3	0	0
111	(Russia) Pavel Kireyenko	Noah	2021–2022	3	0	0	0	0	0	3	0	0
111	(Brazil) Romércio	Ararat-Armenia	2022–2023, 2025	3	1	0	0	0	0	3	1	0.33
111	(Armenia) Gegham Harutyunyan	Noah	2021–2022	3	0	0	0	0	0	3	0	0
111	(Armenia) Grigori Matevosyan	Noah	2021–2022	3	0	0	0	0	0	3	0	0
111	(Nigeria) Friday Adams	Noah	2022–2023	3	0	0	0	0	0	3	0	0
111	(Nigeria) Goodnews Igbokwe	Noah	2022–2024	3	1	0	0	0	0	3	1	0.33
111	(Armenia) Robert Baghramyan	Noah	2022–2023	3	0	0	0	0	0	3	0	0
111	(South Korea) Yeon-seung Kim	Noah	2022–2023	3	0	0	0	0	0	3	0	0
111	(France) Alexandre Llovet	Noah	2023	3	0	0	0	0	0	3	0	0
111	(North Macedonia) Damjan Shishkovski	Ararat-Armenia	2024	2	0	1	0	0	0	3	0	0
111	(Argentina) Alexis Rodríguez	Ararat-Armenia	2024–2025	2	0	1	1	0	0	3	1	0.33
111	(Russia) Nikolai Kipiani	Ararat-Armenia	2023–2024	2	0	1	0	0	0	3	0	0
111	(Armenia) Vaspurak Minasyan	Noah	2023–2024	2	0	1	0	0	0	3	0	0
111	(Netherlands) Jordy Tutuarima	Noah	2023–2024	3	0	0	0	0	0	3	0	0
111	(Ghana) Eric Ocansey	Ararat-Armenia	2024–2025	2	0	1	0	0	0	3	0	0
111	(Albania) Eraldo Çinari	Noah	2024–2025	2	0	1	0	0	0	3	0	0
111	(Ukraine) Danylo Kucher	Ararat-Armenia	2024–2025	3	0	0	0	0	0	3	0	0
111	(Russia) Aleksey Ploshchadny	Noah	2024–2026	2	0	0	0	1	0	3	0	0
111	(Armenia) Hakob Hakobyan	Ararat-Armenia	2022–2026	2	0	1	0	0	0	3	0	0
111	(Armenia) Arman Nersesyan	Ararat-Armenia	2019–Present	1	0	2	0	0	0	3	0	0
111	(Portugal) Bruno Pinto	Ararat-Armenia	2025–2026	2	0	0	0	1	0	3	0	0
111	(Romania) Valentin Costache	Noah	2026–Present	1	0	1	0	1	0	3	0	0
111	(Armenia) Aram Khamoyan	Noah	2025–Present	2	0	1	0	0	0	3	0	0
147	(Bulgaria) Ivaylo Dimitrov	Ararat-Armenia	2018–2019	2	4	0	0	0	0	2	4	2
147	(Russia) Vladislav Oslonovsky	Ararat-Armenia	2018	2	0	0	0	0	0	2	0	0
147	(Bulgaria) Georgi Pashov	Ararat-Armenia	2018–2019	2	0	0	0	0	0	2	0	0
147	(Ukraine) Oleksandr Tupchiyenko	Noah	2018	2	0	0	0	0	0	2	0	0
147	(Armenia) Hovhannes Poghosyan	Noah	2018–2019	2	1	0	0	0	0	2	1	0.5
147	(Armenia) Emil Yeghiazaryan	Noah	2018–2019	2	0	0	0	0	0	2	0	0
147	(Armenia) Grigor Aghekyan	Noah	2018	2	0	0	0	0	0	2	0	0
147	(Armenia) Erik Meliksetyan	Noah	2018–2019	2	0	0	0	0	0	2	0	0
147	(Ukraine) Dmytro Klimakov	Noah	2019	2	0	0	0	0	0	2	0	0
147	(Armenia) Vardan Bakalyan	Noah	2019	2	0	0	0	0	0	2	0	0
147	(Armenia) Vardan Movsisyan	Noah	2019–2021	2	0	0	0	0	0	2	0	0
147	(Morocco) Rochdi Achenteh	Ararat-Armenia	2019–2020	1	0	1	0	0	0	2	0	0
147	(Russia) Vitali Zaprudskikh	Noah	2019–2020	2	0	0	0	0	0	2	0	0
147	(Russia) Sergey Dmitriev	Noah	2019–2020	1	0	1	0	0	0	2	0	0
147	(Russia) Nikita Dubchak	Noah	2020–2021	1	0	0	0	1	0	2	0	0
147	(Peru) Jeisson Martínez	Ararat-Armenia	2020–2021	2	1	0	0	0	0	2	1	0.5
147	(Brazil) Jefferson Oliveira	Noah	2021	2	0	0	0	0	0	2	0	0
147	(Ukraine) Yehor Klymenchuk	Ararat-Armenia	2021–2022	2	0	0	0	0	0	2	0	0
147	(Armenia) Vardan Shahatuni	Ararat-Armenia; Noah	2020–2022; 2022	0; 2	0; 0	0; 0	0; 0	0; 0	0; 0	2	0	0
147	(Russia) Albert Gabarayev	Noah	2021–2022	2	0	0	0	0	0	2	0	0
147	(Russia) Yaroslav Matviyenko	Noah	2021–2022	2	0	0	0	0	0	2	0	0
147	(Moldova) Vadim Paireli	Noah	2021	2	0	0	0	0	0	2	0	0
147	(Moldova) Evgheni Oancea	Noah	2022	2	0	0	0	0	0	2	0	0
147	(Portugal) Hugo Firmino	Ararat-Armenia	2022–2023	2	2	0	0	0	0	2	2	1
147	(Armenia) Gevorg Ghazaryan	Ararat-Armenia	2022–2023	2	0	0	0	0	0	2	0	0
147	(Colombia) Carlos Pérez	Ararat-Armenia	2023	2	0	0	0	0	0	2	0	0
147	(Nigeria) Hilary Gong	Ararat-Armenia	2023	2	0	0	0	0	0	2	0	0
147	(Nigeria) Taofiq Jibril	Ararat-Armenia	2023	2	0	0	0	0	0	2	0	0
147	(Croatia) Dragan Lovrić	Ararat-Armenia	2023	2	0	0	0	0	0	2	0	0
147	(Armenia) Arman Khachatryan	Noah	2022	2	0	0	0	0	0	2	0	0
147	(Armenia) Vahagn Hayrapetyan	Noah	2022–2023	2	0	0	0	0	0	2	0	0
147	(Armenia) Ruben Yesayan	Noah	2022–2023	2	0	0	0	0	0	2	0	0
147	(Armenia) Patvakan Avetisyan	Noah	2022	2	0	0	0	0	0	2	0	0
147	(Armenia) Karen Muradyan	Noah	2022–2023	2	0	0	0	0	0	2	0	0
147	(Russia) Arsen Ayrapetyan	Noah	2022–2023	2	0	0	0	0	0	2	0	0
147	(Romania) Raul Bălbărău	Noah	2023	2	0	0	0	0	0	2	0	0
147	(Nigeria) Peter Olawale	Noah	2023	2	0	0	0	0	0	2	0	0
147	(Mozambique) David Malembana	Noah	2023–2024	1	0	1	0	0	0	2	0	0
147	(New Zealand) Logan Rogerson	Noah	2024	1	0	1	0	0	0	2	0	0
147	(Brazil) Leonardo da Silva	Ararat-Armenia	2023–2024	2	0	0	0	0	0	2	0	0
147	(Uruguay) Nico Varela	Noah	2023–2024	2	1	0	0	0	0	2	1	0.5
147	(Democratic Republic of the Congo) Dieumerci Mbokani	Noah	2023–2024	2	0	0	0	0	0	2	0	0
147	(Iceland) Guðmundur Þórarinsson	Noah	2024–2026	1	0	1	0	0	0	2	0	0
147	(Armenia) Grenik Petrosyan	Noah	2024–Present	1	0	1	0	0	0	2	0	0
147	(Portugal) Gonçalo Gregório	Noah	2024–2026	2	0	0	0	0	0	2	0	0
147	(Armenia) Zaven Khudaverdyan	Noah	2024–Present	2	0	0	0	0	0	2	0	0
147	(Argentina) Bryan Mendoza	Noah	2024–2025	2	0	0	0	0	0	2	0	0
194	(Colombia) Charles Monsalvo	Ararat-Armenia	2018	1	0	0	0	0	0	1	0	0
194	(Australia) Liam Rose	Ararat-Armenia	2018	1	0	0	0	0	0	1	0	0
194	(Armenia) Narek Alaverdyan	Ararat-Armenia	2018–2026	1	0	0	0	0	0	1	0	0
194	(Russia) Arsen Siukayev	Ararat-Armenia	2018	1	0	0	0	0	0	1	0	0
194	(Brazil) Kayron	Ararat-Armenia	2018	1	0	0	0	0	0	1	0	0
194	(Kazakhstan) Akmal Bakhtiyarov	Noah	2018	1	1	0	0	0	0	1	1	1
194	(Armenia) Gevorg Poghosyan	Noah	2018	1	0	0	0	0	0	1	0	0
194	(Armenia) Walter Poghosyan	Noah	2018	1	0	0	0	0	0	1	0	0
194	(Armenia) Norayr Gyozalyan	Noah	2018–2019	1	0	0	0	0	0	1	0	0
194	(Ivory Coast) Jean-Jacques Bougouhi	Ararat-Armenia	2019–2020	1	0	0	0	0	0	1	0	0
194	(Armenia) Hakob Hambardzumyan	Noah	2018–2019	1	0	0	0	0	0	1	0	0
194	(Ivory Coast) Geo Danny Ekra	Noah	2019	1	0	0	0	0	0	1	0	0
194	(Burkina Faso) Abdoul Gafar	Noah	2019	1	0	0	0	0	0	1	0	0
194	(Russia) Maksim Shvagirev	Noah	2019–2020	0	0	1	0	0	0	1	0	0
194	(Russia) Aleksei Turik	Noah	2019	1	0	0	0	0	0	1	0	0
194	(Armenia) David Manoyan	Noah	2019	1	0	0	0	0	0	1	0	0
194	(Russia) Sergey Mikhaylov	Noah	2019–2020	1	0	0	0	0	0	1	0	0
194	(Armenia) Armen Hovhannisyan	Ararat-Armenia	2017–2020, 2020–2022	1	0	0	0	0	0	1	0	0
194	(Russia) Andrei Titov	Noah	2021–2022	1	0	0	0	0	0	1	0	0
194	(Russia) Igor Smirnov	Noah	2021	1	0	0	0	0	0	1	0	0
194	(Armenia) Tigran Sargsyan	Noah	2021–2024	1	0	0	0	0	0	1	0	0
194	(Nigeria) Charles Ikechukwu	Noah	2021–2022	1	0	0	0	0	0	1	0	0
194	(Russia) Artem Filippov	Noah	2021	1	0	0	0	0	0	1	0	0
194	(Armenia) Aleksandr Karapetyan	Ararat-Armenia; Noah	2021; 2021	0; 1	0; 1	0; 0	0; 0	0; 0	0; 0	1	1	1
194	(Serbia) Dobrivoje Velemir	Noah	2021	1	0	0	0	0	0	1	0	0
194	(Moldova) Alexei Ciopa	Noah	2022	1	0	0	0	0	0	1	0	0
194	(Belarus) Ilya Udodov	Noah	2022	1	0	0	0	0	0	1	0	0
194	(Armenia) Gevorg Tarakhchyan	Noah	2022	1	0	0	0	0	0	1	0	0
194	(Russia) Grigori Trufanov	Noah	2022	1	0	0	0	0	0	1	0	0
194	(Armenia) Artur Kartashyan	Noah	2022	1	0	0	0	0	0	1	0	0
194	(Brazil) Agdon Menezes	Ararat-Armenia	2022–2024	1	1	0	0	0	0	1	1	1
194	(Serbia) Miloš Stamenković	Ararat-Armenia	2022–2023	1	0	0	0	0	0	1	0	0
194	(Armenia) Styopa Mkrtchyan	Ararat-Armenia	2020–2024	1	0	0	0	0	0	1	0	0
194	(Armenia) Arman Hovhannisyan	Ararat-Armenia	2018–2019, 2022–2023	1	0	0	0	0	0	1	0	0
194	(Nigeria) Jesse Akila	Ararat-Armenia	2022–2023	1	0	0	0	0	0	1	0	0
194	(Armenia) Anatoly Ayvazov	Noah	2022–2023	1	0	0	0	0	0	1	0	0
194	(Russia) Aleksandr Nesterov	Noah	2022	1	0	0	0	0	0	1	0	0
194	(Armenia) Karen Nalbandyan	Noah	2022	1	0	0	0	0	0	1	0	0
194	(Armenia) Norayr Nikoghosyan	Noah	2022–2024	1	0	0	0	0	0	1	0	0
194	(Ghana) Israel Opoku	Noah	2022–2023	1	0	0	0	0	0	1	0	0
194	(Armenia) Hayk Ghevondyan	Noah	2022–2023	1	0	0	0	0	0	1	0	0
194	(Armenia) Petros Afajanyan	Noah	2022	1	0	0	0	0	0	1	0	0
194	(Armenia) Erjanik Ghubasaryan	Noah	2023–2024	1	0	0	0	0	0	1	0	0
194	(Armenia) Arsen Galstyan	Noah	2023	1	0	0	0	0	0	1	0	0
194	(Senegal) Alfred N'Diaye	Noah	2024	0	0	1	0	0	0	1	0	0
194	(Armenia) Arsen Beglaryan	Ararat-Armenia	2023–2024	1	0	0	0	0	0	1	0	0
194	(Republic of the Congo) Christoffer Mafoumbi	Noah	2023	1	0	0	0	0	0	1	0	0
194	(Armenia) Henri Avagyan	Ararat-Armenia	2025	0	0	1	0	0	0	1	0	0
194	(Portugal) Bruno Almeida	Noah	2025	0	0	1	0	0	0	1	0	0
194	(Belarus) Aleksandr Pavlovets	Ararat-Armenia	2024–2025	1	0	0	0	0	0	1	0	0
194	(Brazil) Pablo Santos	Noah	2024–2025	1	0	0	0	0	0	1	0	0
194	(Armenia) Artur Movsesyan	Noah	2024–Present	1	0	0	0	0	0	1	0	0
194	(Brazil) João Lima	Ararat-Armenia	2025–2026	1	0	0	0	0	0	1	0	0
194	(Croatia) Alen Grgić	Noah	2025	1	0	0	0	0	0	1	0	0
194	(Morocco) Bouchaib Arrassi	Ararat-Armenia	2026	0	0	0	0	1	0	1	0	0
194	(France) Bilal Fofana	Noah	2024–Present	0	0	1	0	0	0	1	0	0
194	(Brazil) João Bravim	Ararat-Armenia	2026–Present	1	0	0	0	0	0	1	0	0
194	(Mozambique) Bruno Wilson	Ararat-Armenia	2026–Present	1	0	0	0	0	0	1	0	0
194	(Brazil) Luis Felipe	Ararat-Armenia	2026–Present	1	0	0	0	0	0	1	0	0
194	(Portugal) Bruno Pereira	Ararat-Armenia	2026–Present	1	0	0	0	0	0	1	0	0
194	(Brazil) Sandro Lima	Ararat-Armenia	2026–Present	1	1	0	0	0	0	1	1	1
194	(France) Maxence Carlier	Ararat-Armenia	2026–Present	1	0	0	0	0	0	1	0	0
194	(Brazil) França	Ararat-Armenia	2026–Present	1	0	0	0	0	0	1	0	0
194	(Armenia) Michel Ayvazyan	Ararat-Armenia	2022–Present	1	0	0	0	0	0	1	0	0
194	(Democratic Republic of the Congo) Stone Mambo	Noah	2026–Present	1	0	0	0	0	0	1	0	0
194	(Serbia) Saša Zdjelar	Noah	2026–Present	1	0	0	0	0	0	1	0	0
194	(Serbia) Marko Lazetić	Noah	2026–Present	1	1	0	0	0	0	1	1	1
194	(Ghana) Clinton Dombila	Noah	2026–Present	1	0	0	0	0	0	1	0	0
194	(Spain) Mario González	Noah	2026–Present	1	0	0	0	0	0	1	0	0
-	Own Goal	Ararat-Armenia; Noah	2018–Present	30	0; 1	5	1; 0	2	0; 0	36	2	0.05

=== Hat-tricks ===
Only one player has scored a hat-trick in a competitive match between Ararat-Armenia and Noah.

Player	For	Score	Date	Competition	Stadium	Ref.
(Bulgaria) Ivaylo Dimitrov	Ararat-Armenia	3–2 (H)	24 November 2018	2018–19 Premier League	Republican Stadium	

Note: (H) – Home; (A) – Away; (N) – Neutral

=== Clean sheets ===
	Name	Club	Years	League apps	League clean sheets	Cup apps	Cup clean sheets	Supercup apps	Supercup clean sheets	Total apps	Total clean sheets	Ratio
1	(Italy) Valerio Vimercati	Noah; Ararat-Armenia	2019–2021, 2023–2024; 2021–2022	3; 2	3; 2	0; 0	0; 0	0; 0	0; 0	5	5	1
2	(Russia) Dmitry Abakumov	Ararat-Armenia	2018–2023	4	4	0	0	0	0	4	4	1
3	(Russia) Vsevolod Ermakov	Ararat-Armenia	2022–2024	2	2	0	0	0	0	2	2	1
3	(Russia) Aleksey Ploshchadny	Noah	2024–2026	2	2	0	0	1	0	3	2	0.67
3	(Brazil) Arthur Coneglian	Noah	2025–Present	1	1	2	2	0	0	3	3	1
6	(Armenia) Ognjen Čančarević	Noah	2024–2026	1	1	0	0	0	0	1	1	1
6	(Armenia) Arman Nersesyan	Ararat-Armenia	2019–Present	1	0	2	1	0	0	3	1	0.33

=== Red cards ===
Three players have been sent off in a competitive match between Ararat-Armenia and Ararat Yerevan.

Player	For	Score	Date	Competition	Stadium	Ref.
(Ivory Coast) Kódjo	Ararat-Armenia	5–5 (N)	10 July 2020	2019–20 Armenian Cup	FFA Stadium	
(Spain) David Bollo	Ararat-Armenia	2–1 (N)	9 August 2020	2020 Armenian Supercup	FFA Stadium	
(Armenia) Davit Terteryan	Ararat-Armenia	0–0 (H)	6 May 2021	2020–21 Armenian Premier League	FFA Stadium	
(Kenya) Amos Nondi	Ararat-Armenia	1–0 (A)	7 November 2023	2023–24 Armenian Premier League	Vahagn Tumasyan Stadium	
(Russia) Armen Ambartsumyan	Ararat-Armenia	2–1 (A)	16 May 2024	2023–24 Armenian Premier League	Vahagn Tumasyan Stadium	
(Brazil) Pablo Santos	Noah	0–1 (A)	28 October 2024	2024–25 Armenian Premier League	FFA Stadium	
(Portugal) Hélder Ferreira	Noah	2–1 (H)	4 December 2024	2024–25 Armenian Premier League	Vahagn Tumasyan Stadium	
(Colombia) Junior Bueno	Ararat-Armenia	2–1 (A)	4 December 2024	2024–25 Armenian Premier League	Vahagn Tumasyan Stadium	
(Colombia) Junior Bueno	Ararat-Armenia	3–1 (A)	13 May 2025	2024–25 Armenian Cup	Republican Stadium	
(Brazil) Welton	Ararat-Armenia	2–2 (H)	20 September 2025	2025–26 Armenian Premier League	FFA Stadium	
(Slovakia) Marin Jakoliš	Noah	2–2 (A)	20 September 2025	2025–26 Armenian Premier League	FFA Stadium	
(France) Virgile Pinson	Noah	2–2 (A)	20 September 2025	2025–26 Armenian Premier League	FFA Stadium	
(Armenia) Kamo Hovhannisyan	Ararat-Armenia	0–1 (H)	16 April 2026	2025–26 Armenian Cup	Vahagn Tumasyan Stadium	
(Guadeloupe) Nathanaël Saintini	Noah	0–1 (A)	16 April 2026	2025–26 Armenian Cup	Vahagn Tumasyan Stadium	
(Guadeloupe) Nathanaël Saintini	Noah	2–1 (A)	26 October 2026	2026–27 Armenian Premier League	Vahagn Tumasyan Stadium	

Note: (H) – Home; (A) – Away; (N) – Neutral
