= 2020–21 FC Noah season =

Noah
2020–21 season
- CEO: Artur Sahakyan
- Manager: Vadim Boreț (until 5 November); Dmitri Gunko (from 5 November)
- Stadium: Alashkert Stadium
- Premier League: 2nd
- Armenian Cup: Semi-final
- Armenian Supercup: Winners
- Europa League: First qualifying round (v. Kairat)
- Top goalscorer: League: Vladimir Azarov (6 goals); All: Petros Avetisyan; Vladimir Azarov (7 each)
Home colours	Away colours	Third colours

The 2020–21 season was FC Noah's 3rd season in Armenian Premier League, and second since they changed their name from Artsakh FC. Noah finished the season in 2nd position, reached the semi-final of the Armenian Cup, won the Armenian Supercup and were knocked out of the UEFA Europa League at the first qualifying round by Kairat.

== Season events ==
On 24 July, Noah extended their contracts with Alan Tatayev, Pavel Deobald and Valerio Vimercati.

On 30 July, Noah announced the signing of goalkeeper Samvel Hunanyan from Dilijan.

On 1 August, Noah announced the signing of Artem Simonyan from Pyunik, and the departure of Vitali Zaprudskikh, Hovhannes Nazaryan, Artem Delinyan, Sergey Dmitriev and Vigen Avetisyan.

On 3 August, Noah announced the signing of Vardan Shakhbazyan from Shirak.

On 29 September, the season was suspended indefinitely due to the escalating 2020 Nagorno-Karabakh conflict. On 13 October, the FFA announced that the season would resume on 17 October.

On 17 October, Noah's match against Lori was postponed due to 7 positive COVID-19 cases within their team. 5 Days later, 22 October, their match against Pyunik was also postponed as a result of the positive COVID-19 cases.

On 5 November, Dmitri Gunko was appointed as the clubs new Head Coach.

On 28 January 2021, Sheriff Tiraspol announced that Vadim Paireli had left their club to sign for Noah.

On 29 January, Noah announced the signings of Dobrivoje Velemir, Gegham Harutyunyan, Pavel Kireyenko and Andrei Titov.

On 31 January, Noah announced the signing of Ashot Adamyan.

On 2 February, Noah announced the signing of Yaroslav Matviyenko from Yenisey Krasnoyarsk, with Jefferson Oliveira joining the following day from Persik Kediri.

On 16 February, Noah announced the signing of Raymond Gyasi from Kazma.

On 27 February, Noah announced the signing of Petros Avetisyan on a free transfer after he'd left Tobol.

== Squad ==
As of match played 14 July 2020

Number	Name	Nationality	Position	Date of birth (age)	Signed from	Signed in	Contract ends	Apps.	Goals
Goalkeepers
1	Samvel Hunanyan	(Armenia)	GK	28 June 2000 (aged 20)	Dilijan	2020		0	0
77	Valerio Vimercati	(Italy)	GK	4 March 1995 (aged 26)	União de Leiria	2019		44	0
	Nikolay Novikov	(Russia)	GK	2 March 2000 (aged 21)	on loan from Rodina Moscow	2021	2021	0	0
Defenders
2	Vardan Shakhbazyan	(Armenia)	DF	29 July 1999 (aged 21)	Shirak	2020		0	0
4	Jordy Monroy	(Armenia)	DF	3 January 1996 (aged 25)	Boyacá Chicó	2020		28	1
5	Vladislav Kryuchkov	(Russia)	DF	24 August 1989 (aged 31)	Baltika Kaliningrad	2019		49	1
14	Mikhail Kovalenko	(Russia)	DF	25 January 1995 (aged 26)	Tyumen	2019		43	2
25	Alan Tatayev	(Russia)	DF	3 August 1995 (aged 25)	Unattached	2019		45	1
27	Jefferson Oliveira	(Brazil)	DF	25 February 1990 (aged 31)	Persik Kediri	2021		9	0
92	Saná Gomes	(Guinea-Bissau)	DF	10 October 1999 (aged 21)	Sertanense	2020		24	2
99	Arman Mkrtchyan	(Armenia)	DF	9 July 1999 (aged 21)	Lori	2020		3	0
Midfielders
7	Eduards Emsis	(Latvia)	MF	23 February 1996 (aged 25)	Jelgava	2020		38	1
8	Yuri Gareginyan	(Armenia)	MF	3 February 1994 (aged 27)	Ararat Yerevan	2018		65	3
9	Vladimir Azarov	(Russia)	MF	23 February 1996 (aged 25)	Sibir Novosibirsk	2019		51	17
10	Benik Hovhannisyan	(Armenia)	MF	1 May 1993 (aged 28)	Alashkert	2019		60	3
15	Yaroslav Matviyenko	(Russia)	MF	22 March 1998 (aged 23)	Yenisey Krasnoyarsk	2021		1	0
16	Helistano Manga	(Guinea-Bissau)	MF	20 May 1999 (aged 22)	União de Leiria	2020		33	1
17	Nikita Dubchak	(Russia)	MF	12 August 1993 (aged 27)	Olimp Khimki	2020		4	0
19	Ashot Adamyan	(Russia)	MF	15 June 1997 (aged 23)	Gandzasar Kapan	2021		1	0
20	Alex Oliveira	(Portugal)	MF	15 June 1997 (aged 23)	União de Leiria	2020		24	3
21	Vadim Paireli	(Moldova)	MF	8 November 1995 (aged 25)	Sheriff Tiraspol	2021		10	1
23	Artur Stepanyan	(Armenia)	MF	17 November 1999 (aged 21)	Ararat Yerevan	2018		4	0
69	Denys Dedechko	(Ukraine)	MF	2 July 1987 (aged 33)	Ararat Yerevan	2020		23	2
78	Maksim Danilin	(Russia)	MF	13 September 2001 (aged 19)	on loan from Spartak-2 Moscow	2021	2021	5	0
88	Dobrivoje Velemir	(Serbia)	MF	14 March 1997 (aged 24)	Bačka	2021		7	0
96	Petros Avetisyan	(Armenia)	MF	7 January 1996 (aged 25)	Tobol	2021		13	7
97	Kirill Bor	(Russia)	MF	9 November 1998 (aged 22)	Ararat Moscow	2019		36	4
Forwards
11	Pavel Kireyenko	(Russia)	FW	14 June 1994 (aged 26)	Tom Tomsk	2021		15	3
22	Gegham Harutyunyan	(Armenia)	FW	23 August 1990 (aged 30)	Gandzasar Kapan	2021		8	0
33	Andrei Titov	(Russia)	FW	5 March 1996 (aged 25)	Akron Tolyatti	2021		12	0
65	Raymond Gyasi	(Ghana)	FW	5 August 1994 (aged 26)	Kazma	2021		11	1
Out on loan
15	Maksim Mayrovich	(Russia)	FW	6 February 1996 (aged 25)	KAMAZ Naberezhnye Chelny	2019		39	17
Players who left during the season
1	Maksim Shvagirev	(Russia)	GK	12 August 1994 (aged 26)	Ararat Moscow	2019		8	0
6	Soslan Kagermazov	(Russia)	DF	20 August 1996 (aged 24)	Fakel Voronezh	2019		29	0
11	Artyom Simonyan	(Armenia)	MF	20 February 1995 (aged 26)	Pyunik	2020		11	3
31	Dmitri Lavrishchev	(Russia)	FW	23 December 1998 (aged 22)	Rotor Volgograd	2019		40	5
57	Pavel Deobald	(Russia)	MF	25 June 1990 (aged 30)	Shinnik Yaroslavl	2019		34	2
94	Dan Spătaru	(Moldova)	MF	24 May 1994 (aged 27)	Liepāja	2020		28	6

== Transfers ==
=== In ===
Date	Position	Nationality	Name	From	Fee	Ref.
16 July 2020	MF	(Ukraine)	Denys Dedechko	Ararat Yerevan	Undisclosed	
17 July 2020	DF	(Armenia)	Arman Mkrtchyan	Lori	Undisclosed	
18 July 2020	MF	(Portugal)	Alex Oliveira	União de Leiria	Undisclosed	
21 July 2020	DF	(Armenia)	Jordy Monroy	Boyacá Chicó	Undisclosed	
22 July 2020	MF	(Russia)	Nikita Dubchak	Olimp Khimki	Undisclosed	
30 July 2020	GK	(Armenia)	Samvel Hunanyan	Dilijan	Undisclosed	
1 August 2020	MF	(Armenia)	Artem Simonyan	Pyunik	Undisclosed	
3 August 2020	DF	(Armenia)	Vardan Shakhbazyan	Shirak	Undisclosed	
28 January 2021	MF	(Moldova)	Vadim Paireli	Sheriff Tiraspol	Undisclosed	
29 January 2021	MF	(Serbia)	Dobrivoje Velemir	OFK Bačka	Undisclosed	
29 January 2021	FW	(Armenia)	Gegham Harutyunyan	Gandzasar Kapan	Undisclosed	
29 January 2021	FW	(Russia)	Pavel Kireyenko	Tom Tomsk	Undisclosed	
29 January 2021	FW	(Russia)	Andrei Titov	Akron Tolyatti	Undisclosed	
31 January 2021	MF	(Armenia)	Ashot Adamyan	Gandzasar Kapan	Free	
2 February 2021	MF	(Russia)	Yaroslav Matviyenko	Yenisey Krasnoyarsk	Undisclosed	
3 February 2021	DF	(Brazil)	Jefferson Oliveira	Persik Kediri	Undisclosed	
16 February 2021	FW	(Ghana)	Raymond Gyasi	Kazma	Undisclosed	
27 February 2021	MF	(Armenia)	Petros Avetisyan	Tobol	Free	

=== Loans in ===
Date from	Position	Nationality	Name	From	Date to	Ref.
18 February 2021	MF	(Russia)	Maksim Danilin	Spartak Moscow	End of season	
1 March 2021	GK	(Russia)	Nikolay Novikov	Rodina Moscow	31 December 2021	

=== Loans out ===
Date from	Position	Nationality	Name	To	Date to	Ref.
29 January 2021	FW	(Russia)	Maksim Mayrovich	Akron Tolyatti	End of season	

=== Released ===
Date	Position	Nationality	Name	Joined	Date	Ref.
27 July 2020	DF	(Armenia)	Hovhannes Nazaryan	Shirak	27 July 2020	
1 August 2020	GK	(Armenia)	Artyom Delinyan	Kuban-Holding Pavlovskaya		
1 August 2020	DF	(Russia)	Vitali Zaprudskikh	Slutsk		
1 August 2020	MF	(Armenia)	Vigen Avetisyan	Lori		
1 August 2020	MF	(Russia)	Sergey Dmitriev	Kolomna		
1 August 2020	FW	(Lithuania)	Rokas Krusnauskas	Gandzasar Kapan		
29 December 2020	MF	(Moldova)	Dan Spătaru	Ararat-Armenia	29 December 2020	
29 December 2020	MF	(Russia)	Pavel Deobald	Turan	8 March 2021	
1 January 2021	GK	(Russia)	Maksim Shvagirev			
17 January 2021	MF	(Armenia)	Artem Simonyan	Tom Tomsk	17 January 2021	
26 January 2021	DF	(Russia)	Soslan Kagermazov	Noah Jurmala		
26 January 2021	FW	(Russia)	Dmitri Lavrishchev	Lokomotiv Gomel		
1 February 2021	DF	(Armenia)	Vardan Movsisyan	Retired		

== Friendlies ==
30 July 2020	Noah	6 – 0	Armenia U-19
(UTC+4)		Report

10 October 2020	Noah	1 – 1	Alashkert	Yerevan
(UTC+4)	Goal	Report	Glišić

24 January 2021	Noah	4 – 2	BKMA Yerevan	Yerevan
(UTC+4)	Azarov; Trialist; K.Bor; Trialist	Report	Mkrtchyan; Mirzoyan

4 February 2021	Noah (Armenia)	0 – 3	(Russia) Zenit St.Petersburg	Dubai, United Arab Emirates
17:00 (UTC+4)		Report	Chistyakov 25'; Krapukhin 38'; M.Pogorelov 86'	Stadium: Nad Al Sheba Stadium

6 February 2021	Atletico Arabia (United Arab Emirates)	0 – 6	(Armenia) Noah	Sharjah, United Arab Emirates
16:00 (UTC+4)		Report	Titov; Rebenja; Paireli; Oliveira

8 February 2021	Noah (Armenia)	1 – 0	(Latvia) Riga	United Arab Emirates
16:00 (UTC+4)	Azarov	Report

11 February 2021	Noah (Armenia)	3 – 2	(Russia) Rodina Moscow	United Arab Emirates
17:30 (UTC+4)	Kovalenko; Paireli; Formigao	Report	V.Volkov; M.Abdusalamov

== Competitions ==
=== Supercup ===
9 August 2020	Noah	2 – 1 (a.e.t.)	Ararat-Armenia	Yerevan
19:00 (UTC+4)	Kovalenko (yellow card) 14'; Emsis (yellow card) 22'; Dedechko (yellow card) 57' (goal) 99' (pen.); Lavrishchev 90'; Manga (yellow card) 91'; Vimercati (yellow card) 108'; Gareginyan (yellow card) 114'	Report	Mailson 60'; Bollo (red card) 115'; Gouffran (yellow card) 120'	Stadium: Football Academy Stadium; Attendance: 0 Referee: Ashot Ghaltakchyan

=== Premier League ===
==== Results summary ====
Overall								Home						Away					
Pld	W	D	L	GF	GA	GD	Pts	W	D	L	GF	GA	GD	W	D	L	GF	GA	GD
24	12	5	7	35	20	+15	41	7	3	3	22	10	+12	5	2	4	13	10	+3

Last updated: 28 May 2021.
Source: See Results

==== Results by round ====
Round	1	2	3	4	5	6	7	8	9	10	11	12	13	14	15	16	17	18	19	20	21	22	23	24
Ground	H	A	H	A	A	A	H	A	A	H	A	H	A	H	H	H	A	H	A	H	H	A	A	H
Result	D	L	W	W	W	L	D	L	D	D	W	W	L	W	L	W	W	W	D	W	W	W	L	L
Position	3	4	2	6	3	6	5	5	3	5	5	5	5	4	4	4	4	1	2	1	1	1	1	2

Updated to match(es) played on 28 May 2021. Source: See Results
A = Away; H = Home; W = Win; D = Draw; L = Loss

==== Results ====
16 August 2020 1	Noah	2 – 2	Shirak	Yerevan
17:30 (UTC+4)	Spătaru 14'; K.Bor (yellow card) 37'; Dedechko (yellow card) 39'; Simonyan (yellow card) 40'; Azarov 71' (pen.); Deobald (yellow card) 76'; Kovalenko (yellow card) 79'	Report	P.Afajanyan (yellow card) 37'; A.Aslanyan 41' (pen.) (yellow card) 78'; Mikaelyan (yellow card) 54' (goal) 77'; E.Vardanyan (yellow card) 66'; A.Gevorkyan (yellow card) 83'	Stadium: Alashkert Stadium; Attendance: 0 Referee: Shahen Aghayan
Note: Match played behind closed doors due to the COVID-19 pandemic.

21 August 2020 2	Alashkert	1 – 0	Noah	Yerevan
17:00 (UTC+4)	Mitrevski (yellow card) 61'; Čančarević (yellow card) 63'; Glišić (yellow card) 72'; Grigoryan (yellow card) 79'; D.Davidyan 90+1'	Report	Manga (yellow card) 45'; Spătaru (yellow card) 79'; Azarov (yellow card) 83'	Stadium: Alashkert Stadium; Attendance: 0 Referee: Ashot Ghaltakchyan
Note: Match played behind closed doors due to the COVID-19 pandemic.

11 September 2020 4	Noah	2 – 1	Ararat Yerevan	Yerevan
16:45 (UTC+4)	Manga (yellow card) 45'; Lavrishchev (yellow card) 72'; Simonyan 86', 89' (pen.)	Report	Mkoyan (yellow card) 19'; K.Muradyan (yellow card) 39'; Khurtsidze 52'; Spychka (yellow card) 62'	Stadium: Alashkert Stadium; Attendance: 0 Referee: Ashot Ghaltakchyan
Note: Match played behind closed doors due to the COVID-19 pandemic.

22 September 2020 5	Urartu	0 – 3	Noah	Yerevan
19:30 (UTC+4)	Darbinyan (yellow card) 22'; Désiré (yellow card) 45'; Osipov (yellow card) 45'; U.Iwu (yellow card) 90'	Report	S.Gomes 40', 45'; Emsis (yellow card) 48'; Gareginyan (yellow card) 71'; Hovhannisyan 76'	Stadium: Urartu Stadium; Attendance: 0 Referee: Henrik Nalbandyan
Note: Match played behind closed doors due to the COVID-19 pandemic.

30 October 2020 10	Shirak	0 – 3	Noah	Gyumri
15:00 (UTC+4)	H.Geghamyan (yellow card) 28'; P.Afajanyan (yellow card) 35'; R.Mkrtchyan (yellow card) 37'; H.Nazaryan (yellow card) 47'; V.Arzoyan (yellow card) 88'	Report	Spătaru 42'; Azarov 48' (pen.), 55'; Kryuchkov (yellow card) 57'; Monroy (yellow card) 89'	Stadium: Gyumri City Stadium; Attendance: 0 Referee: Artur Safaryan
Note: Match played behind closed doors due to the COVID-19 pandemic.

2 November 2020 11	Noah	1 – 2	Alashkert	Yerevan
16:00 (UTC+4)	Hovhannisyan (yellow card) 68'; A.Oliveira 86'	Report	Glišić (yellow card) 7' (goal) 25' (pen.); D.Davidyan 45'; Aghekyan (red card) 72'	Stadium: Alashkert Stadium; Attendance: 0 Referee: Ashot Ghaltakchyan
Note: Match played behind closed doors due to the COVID-19 pandemic.

8 November 2020 3	Noah	0 – 0	Ararat-Armenia	Yerevan
15:30 (UTC+4)	Manga (yellow card) 59'; Kryuchkov (yellow card) 90+1'	Report	Danielyan (yellow card) 36'; Louis (yellow card) 54'	Stadium: FFA Academy Stadium; Attendance: 0 Referee: Zaven Hovhannisyan
Note: Match played behind closed doors due to the COVID-19 pandemic.

23 November 2020 12	Ararat-Armenia	3 – 1	Noah	Yerevan
17:00 (UTC+4)	Bollo 8' (yellow card) 41'; Martínez 38' (yellow card) 88'; Ângelo (yellow card) 55'; S.Shahinyan 70'; Gouffran (yellow card) 74'; Mailson (yellow card) 90+4'	Report	A.Oliveira 35'; S.Gomes (yellow card) 46'; Simonyan (yellow card) 61'; Spătaru (yellow card) 75'	Stadium: FFA Academy Stadium; Attendance: 0 Referee: Henrik Nalbandyan
Note: Match played behind closed doors due to the COVID-19 pandemic.

27 November 2020 13	Ararat Yerevan	1 – 1	Noah	Yerevan
18:00 (UTC+4)	Nenadović 83'	Report	Simonyan 22'; Mayrovich (yellow card) 71'	Stadium: Republican Stadium; Attendance: 0 Referee: Henrik Nalbandyan
Note: Match played behind closed doors due to the COVID-19 pandemic.

1 December 2020 14	Noah	1 – 1	Urartu	Yerevan
14:00 (UTC+4)	Mayrovich 9'; Spătaru (yellow card) 21'; Kovalenko (yellow card) 68'; Manga (yellow card) 87'	Report	Kobzar 30' (pen.); Radchenko (yellow card) 59'	Stadium: FFA Academy Stadium; Attendance: 0 Referee: Zaven Hovhannisyan
Note: Match played behind closed doors due to the COVID-19 pandemic.

5 December 2020 15	Van	0 – 1	Noah	Charentsavan
14:00 (UTC+4)	A.Petrosyan (yellow card) 68'; G.Kirakosyan (yellow card) 82'	Report	Mayrovich 27'; Emsis (yellow card) 58'; Spătaru (yellow card) 90+2'; A.Mkrtchyan (yellow card) 90+5'	Stadium: Charentsavan City Stadium; Attendance: 0 Referee: Artak Simonyan
Note: Match played behind closed doors due to the COVID-19 pandemic.

19 February 2021 6	Noah	4 – 0	Van	Yerevan
14:00 (UTC+4)	Azarov 9' (pen.); A.Oliveira 52'; Kireyenko 54' (pen.); Paireli 63' (pen.)	Report	E.Essien (yellow card) 30'; V.Ayvazyan (yellow card) 42'; Voskanyan (yellow card) 45'	Stadium: Pyunik Training Centre; Referee: Artur Safaryan

4 March 2021 17	Lori	2 – 0	Noah	Vanadzor
14:00 (UTC+4)	N.Tripkovic 12'; D.Paremuzyan (yellow card) 30'; A.Avagyan (yellow card) 38'; Alexis (yellow card) 61'; Božović (yellow card) 75'; Šćekić (yellow card) 83'; V.Bakalyan (yellow card) 84'; Poghosyan 90+2'	Report	Gareginyan (yellow card) 9'; Emsis (yellow card) 38'; S.Gomes (yellow card) 62'; Matviyenko (yellow card) 79'	Stadium: Vanadzor Football Academy; Attendance: 200; Referee: Zaven Hovhannisyan

8 March 2021 8	Noah	3 – 1	Lori	Yerevan
15:00 (UTC+4)	Azarov 31' (pen.); Kovalenko (yellow card) 42'; Dedechko (yellow card) 45'; Vimercati (yellow card) 55'; Rudoselskiy 56' (o.g.); Monroy 66' (yellow card) 81'	Report	N.Antwi (yellow card) 33'; Alexis (yellow card) 38'; Poghosyan (yellow card) 45'; Claudir (yellow card) 45' (yellow-red card) 90+2'; Božović (yellow card) 69'; A.Mensalão 81' (yellow card) 88'; Stepanov (yellow card) 90'	Stadium: Alashkert Stadium; Attendance: 180; Referee: Henrik Nalbandyan
Note: Match original scheduled for and postponed on 17 October due to a COVID-19 outbreak within the Noah team.

16 March 2021 18	Noah	0 – 1	Pyunik	Yerevan
15:00 (UTC+4)	Gareginyan (yellow card) 45'; Titov (yellow card) 80'; Vimercati (yellow card) 86'	Report	Grigoryan 45'; Honchar (yellow card) 45'; Buchnev (yellow card) 70'; Tatarkov (yellow card) 80'; Kobyalko (yellow card) 84' (penalty missed) 88'	Stadium: FFA Academy Stadium; Attendance: 500; Referee: Ashot Ghaltakchyan

9 April 2021 19	Noah	1 – 0	Pyunik	Yerevan
14:00 (UTC+4)	Azarov (yellow card) 6' (goal) 90+4'; Kovalenko (yellow card) 18'; Kryuchkov (yellow card) 54'; Vimercati (yellow card) 90+1'	Report		Stadium: FFA Academy Stadium; Attendance: 300; Referee: Ashot Ghaltakchyan

15 April 2021 20	Ararat Yerevan	2 – 3	Noah	Yerevan
18:00 (UTC+4)	J.Bravo 2'; M.Kone 16' (yellow card) 45'; Mkoyan (yellow card) 81'	Report	Emsis 18' (yellow card) 26'; Avetisyan 25'; Hovhannisyan (yellow card) 45'; Kovalenko (yellow card) 45'; Kireyenko 74'; Velemir (yellow card) 90'; Kryuchkov (yellow card) 90'	Stadium: Republican Stadium; Referee: Zaven Hovhannisyan

26 April 2021 21	Noah	1 – 0	Alashkert	Yerevan
18:00 (UTC+4)	Kireyenko 22'; Emsis (yellow card) 37'; Kryuchkov (yellow card) 64'; Velemir (yellow card) 65'	Report	Voskanyan (yellow card) 35'; Grigoryan (yellow card) 37'; Kadio (yellow card) 40'; Hovsepyan (yellow card) 57'	Stadium: FFA Academy Stadium; Referee: Artem Gasparyan

6 May 2021 22	Ararat-Armenia	0 – 0	Noah	Yerevan
19:00 (UTC+4)	Ambartsumyan (yellow card) 38'; D.Terteryan (red card) 49'; Wbeymar (yellow card) 77'; Bueno (yellow card) 86'	Report	Monroy (yellow card) 61'; Avetisyan (yellow card) 86'	Stadium: FFA Academy Stadium; Attendance: 800; Referee: Zaven Hovhannisyan

9 May 2021 26	Noah	3 – 0	Lori	Yerevan
12:00 (UTC+4)		Report		Stadium: FFA Academy Stadium
Note: Match awarded 3-0 to Noah.

11 May 2021 23	Noah	3 – 0	Shirak	Yerevan
16:00 (UTC+4)	Avetisyan 6', 41'; Hovhannisyan 46'	Report	H.Nazaryan (yellow card) 75'; A.Sadoyan (red card) 90+2'	Stadium: FFA Academy Stadium; Attendance: 700; Referee: Artur Safaryan

15 May 2021 9	Pyunik	0 – 1	Noah	Yerevan
15:00 (UTC+4)	Kartashyan (yellow card) 6'; A.Avanesyan (yellow card) 67'; Grigoryan (yellow card) 69'; J.Balza (red card) 75'; Salou (yellow card) 90+4'	Report	Emsis (yellow card) 24'; S.Gomes (yellow card) 67'; Azarov (yellow card) 69'; Avetisyan 89'	Stadium: FFA Academy Stadium; Referee: Zaven Hovhannisyan
Note: Match originally scheduled for 24 October, but postponed on 22 October due to the COVID-19 pandemic.

19 May 2021 24	Urartu	1 – 0	Noah	Yerevan
19:30 (UTC+4)	U.Iwu 3'; E.Simonyan (yellow card) 53'; E.Grigoryan (yellow card) 76'; Beglaryan (yellow card) 90+4'; G.Tarakhchyan (yellow card) 90+5'	Report	S.Gomes (yellow card) 19'; Vimercati (yellow card) 45'; Emsis (yellow card) 45'; Avetisyan (yellow card) 73'; Harutyunyan (yellow card) 74' (red card) 90+6'; Titov (yellow card) 77'; Kovalenko (yellow card) 82'	Stadium: Urartu Stadium; Attendance: 1,500; Referee: Ashot Ghaltakchyan

28 May 2021 25	Noah	1 – 2	Van	Yerevan
17:30 (UTC+4)	S.Gomes (yellow card) 45'; Avetisyan 67'; Monroy (yellow card) 85'; Emsis (yellow card) 86'; Kovalenko (yellow card) 90+6'	Report	Va.Ayvazyan (yellow card) 18'; D.Dosa 80'; E.Movsesyan 87' (yellow card) 87'	Stadium: FFA Academy Stadium; Attendance: 1,000; Referee: Zaven Hovhannisyan

==== Table ====
Pos	Team	Pld	W	D	L	GF	GA	GD	Pts	Qualification or relegation
1	Alashkert (C)	24	13	7	4	25	15	+10	46	Qualification for the Champions League first qualifying round
2	Noah	24	12	5	7	35	20	+15	41	Qualification for the Europa Conference League first qualifying round
3	Urartu	24	12	5	7	28	19	+9	41	Qualification for the Europa Conference League first qualifying round
4	Ararat (Note: Ararat qualified for Europa Conference League first qualifying round as winners of 2020–21 Armenian Cup.)	24	11	7	6	34	18	+16	40	Qualification for the Europa Conference League first qualifying round
5	Ararat-Armenia	24	10	8	6	32	17	+15	38	
6	Van	24	9	4	11	25	30	−5	31	
7	Pyunik	24	6	7	11	20	18	+2	25	
8	Lori (Note: Round 19–27 matches involving Lori were all declared 3–0 forfeits in favor of the remaining 8 teams.)	24	7	2	15	16	44	−28	23	
9	Shirak (R)	24	2	7	15	19	53	−34	13	Relegation to First League
10	Gandzasar (R, D)	0	0	0	0	0	0	0	0	Club disqualified (Note: Gandzasar were excluded from the league On 3 November, Gandzasar Kapan announced that they were withdrawing from the League and Armenian Cup due to the ongoing financial constraints relating to the ongoing COVID-19 pandemic in Armenia and the 2020 Nagorno-Karabakh conflict.)

Source: FFA Soccerway
Rules for classification: 1) Points; 2) Play-off (only if deciding champion); 3) Matches won; 4) Head-to-head points; 5) Head-to-head matches won; 6) Head-to-head goal difference; 7) Head-to-head goals scored; 8) Head-to-head away goals scored; 9) Goal difference; 10) Goals scored.
(C) Champions; (D) Disqualified; (R) Relegated

=== Armenian Cup ===
12 March 2021 Quarterfinal 1st leg	Urartu	0 – 2	Noah	Yerevan
17:00 (UTC+4)	Tigran Ayunts (yellow card) 23'; Ten (yellow card) 76'	Report	Avetisyan 24' (pen.); Manga 25'; Saná Gomes (yellow card) 36'; Dedechko (yellow card) 65'	Stadium: Urartu Stadium; Attendance: 500; Referee: Artem Gasparyan

3 April 2021 Quarterfinal 2nd leg	Noah	2 – 2 (4 – 2 agg.)	Urartu	Yerevan
15:00 (UTC+4)	Emsis (yellow card) 36'; Dedechko 45' (red card) 60'; A.Oliveira (yellow card) 50'; Velemir (yellow card) 73'; Azarov 75'; Hovhannisyan (yellow card) 86'	Report	K.Melkonyan (yellow card) 47'; Paramonov (yellow card) 73'; A.Mensah (red card) 84'; Désiré 88'; Paderin 90' (pen.); E.Grigoryan (yellow card) 90+4'	Stadium: Avan Academy Stadium; Attendance: 300; Referee: Henrik Nalbandyan

20 April 2021 Semifinal 1st leg	Alashkert	1 – 1	Noah	Yerevan
15:00 (UTC+4)	Kadio (yellow card) 12'; Glišić 31' (pen.); Grigoryan (yellow card) 70'; Gome (yellow card) 90+3'	Report	S.Gomes (yellow card) 22'; Kovalenko (yellow card) 22'; Paireli (yellow card) 38'; Avetisyan 66' (pen.); Hovhannisyan (yellow card) 81'; Monroy (yellow card) 83'	Stadium: Alashkert Stadium; Attendance: 100; Referee: Zaven Hovhannisyan

30 April 2021 Semifinal 2nd leg	Noah	1 – 3 (2 – 4 agg.)	Alashkert	Yerevan
15:00 (UTC+4)	Gyasi 41'; N.Dubchak (yellow card) 64'; Emsis (yellow card) 66'; Vimercati (yellow card) 90+2'; Monroy (yellow card) 90+2'	Report	Hovsepyan 3'; Gome (yellow card) 26'; Glišić 58' (yellow card) 70'; M.Manasyan (yellow card) 90+2'; D.Davidyan 90+5'	Stadium: FFA Academy Stadium; Attendance: 500; Referee: Henrik Nalbandyan

=== UEFA Europa League ===
==== Qualifying rounds ====
27 August 2020 First Qualifying Round	Kairat (Kazakhstan)	4 – 1	(Armenia) Noah	Almaty, Kazakhstan
18:00 (UTC+4)	Alykulov 12' (yellow card) 72'; Vágner Love 35', 70'; Dugalić (yellow card) 74'; Eseola 90+4'	Report	K.Bor 8' (yellow card) 90+2'; Dedechko (yellow card) 22'	Stadium: Central Stadium; Attendance: 0 Referee: Kristoffer Karlsson (Sweden)
Note: Match played behind closed doors.

== Statistics ==
As of match played 28 May 2021

=== Appearances and goals ===
No.	Pos	Nat	Player	Total		Premier League		Armenian Cup		Armenian Supercup		UEFA Europa League	
No.	Pos	Nat	Player	Apps	Goals	Apps	Goals	Apps	Goals	Apps	Goals	Apps	Goals
4	DF	(Armenia) ARM	Jordy Monroy	28	1	23	1	3+1	0	0+1	0	0	0
5	DF	(Russia) RUS	Vladislav Kryuchkov	22	0	16	0	4	0	1	0	1	0
7	MF	(Latvia) LAT	Eduards Emsis	22	1	15+2	1	3	0	1	0	1	0
8	MF	(Armenia) ARM	Yuri Gareginyan	16	0	6+7	0	0+2	0	0+1	0	0	0
9	MF	(Russia) RUS	Vladimir Azarov	21	7	14+2	6	2+2	1	0	0	1	0
10	MF	(Armenia) ARM	Benik Hovhannisyan	26	2	15+7	2	1+1	0	1	0	0+1	0
11	FW	(Russia) RUS	Pavel Kireyenko	15	3	8+3	3	2+2	0	0	0	0	0
14	DF	(Russia) RUS	Mikhail Kovalenko	21	0	14+2	0	3	0	1	0	1	0
15	MF	(Russia) RUS	Yaroslav Matviyenko	1	0	0+1	0	0	0	0	0	0	0
16	MF	(Guinea-Bissau) GBS	Helistano Manga	18	1	9+6	0	2	1	0+1	0	0	0
17	MF	(Russia) RUS	Nikita Dubchak	4	0	2	0	1	0	0+1	0	0	0
19	MF	(Armenia) ARM	Ashot Adamyan	1	0	0+1	0	0	0	0	0	0	0
20	MF	(Portugal) POR	Alex Oliveira	24	3	8+12	3	3+1	0	0	0	0	0
21	MF	(Moldova) MDA	Vadim Paireli	10	1	4+2	1	2+2	0	0	0	0	0
22	FW	(Armenia) ARM	Gegham Harutyunyan	8	0	0+5	0	2+1	0	0	0	0	0
25	DF	(Russia) RUS	Alan Tatayev	6	0	6	0	0	0	0	0	0	0
27	DF	(Brazil) BRA	Jefferson Oliveira	9	0	5+1	0	1+2	0	0	0	0	0
33	FW	(Russia) RUS	Andrei Titov	12	0	1+7	0	0+4	0	0	0	0	0
65	FW	(Ghana) GHA	Raymond Gyasi	11	1	7+2	0	2	1	0	0	0	0
69	MF	(Ukraine) UKR	Denys Dedechko	23	2	18	0	3	1	1	1	1	0
77	GK	(Italy) ITA	Valerio Vimercati	27	0	21	0	4	0	1	0	1	0
78	MF	(Russia) RUS	Maksim Danilin	5	0	2+2	0	1	0	0	0	0	0
88	MF	(Serbia) SRB	Dobrivoje Velemir	7	0	0+5	0	0+2	0	0	0	0	0
92	DF	(Guinea-Bissau) GBS	Saná Gomes	22	2	15+3	2	2	0	1	0	0+1	0
96	MF	(Armenia) ARM	Petros Avetisyan	13	7	10	5	3	2	0	0	0	0
97	MF	(Russia) RUS	Kirill Bor	11	1	5+4	0	0	0	1	0	1	1
99	DF	(Armenia) ARM	Arman Mkrtchyan	3	0	0+3	0	0	0	0	0	0	0
Players away on loan:
15	FW	(Russia) RUS	Maksim Mayrovich	7	2	6+1	2	0	0	0	0	0	0
Players who left Noah during the season:
1	GK	(Russia) RUS	Maksim Shvagirev	2	0	2	0	0	0	0	0	0	0
6	DF	(Russia) RUS	Soslan Kagermazov	3	0	0+2	0	0	0	0	0	1	0
11	MF	(Armenia) ARM	Artem Simonyan	11	3	7+2	3	0	0	1	0	0+1	0
31	FW	(Russia) RUS	Dmitri Lavrishchev	12	1	2+8	0	0	0	0+1	1	1	0
57	MF	(Russia) RUS	Pavel Deobald	10	0	3+5	0	0	0	1	0	1	0
94	MF	(Moldova) MDA	Dan Spătaru	12	2	9+1	2	0	0	1	0	1	0

=== Goal scorers ===
Place	Position	Nation	Number	Name	Premier League	Armenian Cup	Armenian Supercup	UEFA Europa League	Total
1	MF	(Russia)	9	Vladimir Azarov	6	1	0	0	7
1	MF	(Armenia)	96	Petros Avetisyan	5	2	0	0	7
3	FW	(Armenia)	11	Artem Simonyan	3	0	0	0	3
3	MF	(Portugal)	20	Alex Oliveira	3	0	0	0	3
3	FW	(Russia)	11	Pavel Kireyenko	3	0	0	0	3
6	DF	(Guinea-Bissau)	92	Saná Gomes	2	0	0	0	2
6	MF	(Moldova)	94	Dan Spătaru	2	0	0	0	2
6	FW	(Russia)	15	Maksim Mayrovich	2	0	0	0	2
6	MF	(Armenia)	10	Benik Hovhannisyan	2	0	0	0	2
6	MF	(Ukraine)	69	Denys Dedechko	0	1	1	0	2
11	MF	(Moldova)	21	Vadim Paireli	1	0	0	0	1
11	DF	(Armenia)	4	Jordy Monroy	1	0	0	0	1
11	MF	(Latvia)	7	Eduards Emsis	1	0	0	0	1
11	MF	(Guinea-Bissau)	16	Helistano Manga	0	1	0	0	1
11	FW	(Ghana)	65	Raymond Gyasi	0	1	0	0	1
11	FW	(Russia)	31	Dmitri Lavrishchev	0	0	1	0	1
11	MF	(Russia)	97	Kirill Bor	0	0	0	1	1
11				Own goal	1	0	0	0	1
				Awarded	3	0	0	0	3
				TOTALS	35	6	2	1	44

=== Clean sheets ===
Place	Position	Nation	Number	Name	Premier League	Armenian Cup	Armenian Supercup	UEFA Europa League	Total
1	GK	(Italy)	77	Valerio Vimercati	10	1	0	0	11
				TOTALS	10	1	0	0	11

=== Disciplinary record ===
Number	Nation	Position	Name	Premier League		Armenian Cup		Armenian Supercup		UEFA Europa League		Total	
Number	Nation	Position	Name	Booked	Sent off (straight red)	Booked	Sent off (straight red)	Booked	Sent off (straight red)	Booked	Sent off (straight red)	Booked	Sent off (straight red)
4	(Armenia)	DF	Jordy Monroy	4	0	2	0	0	0	0	0	6	0
5	(Russia)	DF	Vladislav Kryuchkov	5	0	0	0	0	0	0	0	5	0
7	(Latvia)	MF	Eduards Emsis	8	0	2	0	1	0	0	0	11	0
8	(Armenia)	MF	Yuri Gareginyan	3	0	0	0	1	0	0	0	4	0
9	(Russia)	MF	Vladimir Azarov	3	0	0	0	0	0	0	0	3	0
10	(Armenia)	MF	Benik Hovhannisyan	2	0	2	0	0	0	0	0	4	0
14	(Russia)	DF	Mikhail Kovalenko	7	0	1	0	1	0	0	0	9	0
15	(Russia)	MF	Yaroslav Matviyenko	1	0	0	0	0	0	0	0	1	0
16	(Guinea-Bissau)	MF	Helistano Manga	4	0	0	0	1	0	0	0	5	0
17	(Russia)	MF	Nikita Dubchak	0	0	1	0	0	0	0	0	1	0
20	(Portugal)	MF	Alex Oliveira	0	0	1	0	0	0	0	0	1	0
21	(Moldova)	MF	Vadim Paireli	0	0	1	0	0	0	0	0	1	0
22	(Armenia)	FW	Gegham Harutyunyan	1	1	0	0	0	0	0	0	1	1
33	(Russia)	FW	Andrei Titov	2	0	0	0	0	0	0	0	2	0
69	(Ukraine)	MF	Denys Dedechko	2	0	1	1	1	0	1	0	5	1
77	(Italy)	GK	Valerio Vimercati	4	0	1	0	1	0	0	0	6	0
88	(Serbia)	MF	Dobrivoje Velemir	2	0	1	0	0	0	0	0	3	0
92	(Guinea-Bissau)	DF	Saná Gomes	6	0	2	0	0	0	0	0	8	0
96	(Armenia)	MF	Petros Avetisyan	2	0	0	0	0	0	0	0	2	0
97	(Russia)	MF	Kirill Bor	1	0	0	0	0	0	1	0	2	0
99	(Armenia)	DF	Arman Mkrtchyan	1	0	0	0	0	0	0	0	1	0
Players away on loan:
15	(Russia)	FW	Maksim Mayrovich	1	0	0	0	0	0	0	0	1	0
Players who left Noah during the season:
11	(Armenia)	MF	Artem Simonyan	2	0	0	0	0	0	0	0	2	0
31	(Russia)	FW	Dmitri Lavrishchev	1	0	0	0	0	0	0	0	1	0
57	(Russia)	MF	Pavel Deobald	2	0	0	0	0	0	0	0	2	0
94	(Moldova)	MF	Dan Spătaru	2	0	0	0	0	0	0	0	2	0
			TOTALS	66	1	15	1	6	0	2	0	89	2
