= 2020 Armenian Cup final =

- Event: 2019–20 Armenian Cup
Noah	Ararat-Armenia
5	5
- After extra time Noah won 7–6 on penalties
- Date: 10 July 2020
- Venue: Football Academy Stadium, Yerevan
- Referee: Zaven Hovhannisyan (Yerevan)
- Attendance: 0 (Note: The final was played behind closed doors due to the COVID-19 pandemic in Armenia.)

The 2020 Armenian Cup final was the 29th Armenian Cup Final, and the final match of the 2019–20 Armenian Cup. It was played at the Football Academy Stadium in Yerevan, Armenia, on 10 July 2020, contested by Noah and Ararat-Armenia. This was the first appearance for both clubs in the Final of the Armenian Cup, with Noah defeating Ararat-Armenia 7–6 on penalties after the match finished 5–5. Since both Noah and Ararat-Armenia had already qualified for European competitions via the Armenian Premier League, it meant fourth placed Shirak would also enter the 2020–21 UEFA Europa League at the first qualifying round.

== Match ==
=== Details ===
10 July 2020
19:00 AMT

Noah	5–5	Ararat-Armenia
Mayrovich 39', 60'; Azarov 56' (pen.), 115' (pen.); Spătaru 67'	Report	Louis 8', 40'; A.Tatayev 23' (o.g.); Otubanjo 29', 117'
Penalties
K.Bor (penalty missed); Azarov (penalty scored); V.Avetisyan (penalty missed); Gareginyan (penalty scored); S.Dmitriev (penalty scored); Kovalenko (penalty scored); E.Grigoryan (penalty scored); Kryuchkov (penalty scored); R.Krusnauskas (penalty scored)	7–6	(penalty missed) A.Nahapetyan; (penalty scored) Kobyalko; (penalty scored) Ângelo; (penalty missed) Malakyan; (penalty scored) Otubanjo; (penalty scored) Sanogo; (penalty scored) Christian; (penalty scored) Guz; (penalty missed) Danielyan

Football Academy Stadium, Yerevan
Attendance: 0
Referee: Zaven Hovhannisyan (Yerevan)

Noah	Ararat-Armenia

GK	37	(Russia) Maksim Shvagirev
DF	3	(Russia) Alan Tatayev
DF	5	(Russia) Vladislav Kryuchkov	(yellow card) 49'
DF	14	(Russia) Mikhail Kovalenko	(yellow card) 106'
MF	7	(Latvia) Eduards Emsis		(substituted off) 111'
MF	9	(Russia) Vladimir Azarov
MF	16	(Guinea-Bissau) Helistano Manga		(substituted off) 46'
MF	57	(Russia) Pavel Deobald		(substituted off) 75'
MF	94	(Moldova) Dan Spătaru		(substituted off) 76'
FW	15	(Russia) Maksim Mayrovich		(substituted off) 58'
FW	31	(Russia) Dmitri Lavrishchev		(substituted off) 88'
Substitutes:
GK	28	(Armenia) Artem Delinyan
GK	77	(Italy) Valerio Vimercati
DF	22	(Armenia) Vardan Movsisyan	(yellow card) 113'
DF	33	(Armenia) Hovhannes Nazaryan
MF	8	(Armenia) Yuri Gareginyan		(substituted in) 76'
MF	10	(Armenia) Benik Hovhannisyan
MF	11	(Armenia) Vigen Avetisyan		(substituted in) 111'
MF	20	(Armenia) Edgar Grigoryan		(substituted in) 76'
MF	24	(Russia) Sergey Dmitriev		(substituted in) 58'
MF	88	(Armenia) Ashot Mkrtchyan
MF	97	(Russia) Kirill Bor	(yellow card) 105'	(substituted in) 46'
FW	21	(Lithuania) Rokas Krusnauskas		(substituted in) 88'
Manager:
(Moldova) Vadim Boreț

GK	44	(Serbia) Stefan Čupić	(yellow card) 122'
DF	3	(Portugal) Ângelo Meneses
DF	20	(Morocco) Rochdi Achenteh	(yellow card) 55'	(substituted off) 60'
DF	22	(Armenia) Artur Danielyan
MF	10	(Russia) Armen Ambartsumyan		(substituted off) 74'
MF	27	(Netherlands) Furdjel Narsingh		(substituted off) 84'
MF	63	(Ivory Coast) Kódjo	(red card) 90+3'
MF	79	(Ukraine) Serhiy Vakulenko		(substituted off) 91'
MF	94	(Cape Verde) Mailson Lima		(substituted off) 74'
FW	24	(Nigeria) Yusuf Otubanjo
FW	99	(Nigeria) Ogana Louis		(substituted off) 84'
Substitutes:
GK	1	(Armenia) Suren Aloyan
DF	4	(Armenia) Albert Khachumyan
DF	15	(Russia) Dmitry Guz		(substituted in) 91'
DF	21	(North Macedonia) Aleksandar Damčevski
DF	93	(Haiti) Alex Junior Christian		(substituted in) 60'
MF	7	(Armenia) Armen Nahapetyan		(substituted in) 84'
MF	8	(Armenia) Gor Malakyan		(substituted in) 74'
MF	11	(Armenia) Hovhannes Harutyunyan
MF	67	(Estonia) Ilja Antonov
FW	17	(Burkina Faso) Zakaria Sanogo		(substituted in) 74'
FW	18	(Russia) Artyom Avanesyan
FW	32	(Russia) Anton Kobyalko	(yellow card) 89'	(substituted in) 84'
Manager:
(Armenia) Vardan Minasyan

Man of the Match:

Assistant referees:
Mesrop Ghazaryan (Yerevan)
Artur Gdlyan (Yerevan)
Fourth official:
Shahen Aghayan (Yerevan)

Match rules

- 90 minutes
- 30 minutes of extra time if necessary
- Penalty shoot-out if scores still level
- Twelve named substitutes
- Maximum of five substitutions, with a sixth allowed in extra time
