= 2020 Armenian Supercup =

Noah	Ararat-Armenia
2	1
- Date: 9 August 2020
- Venue: FFA Academy Stadium, Yerevan
- Referee: Ashot Ghaltakchyan
- Attendance: 0

The 2020 Armenian Supercup was the 23rd Armenian Supercup, an annual football match played between the winners of the previous season's Premier League, Ararat-Armenia, and the previous season's Armenian Cup, Noah, with the latter winning 2–1 after extra time.

== Background ==
Noah won their 1st Armenian Cup title after beating Ararat-Armenia 7–6 on penalties after a 5–5 draw in final.

Ararat-Armenia won their second League title since their formation prior to the 2017–18 season.

== Match details ==
9 August 2020
19:00 (UTC+4)

Noah	2 – 1 (a.e.t.)	Ararat-Armenia
Lavrishchev 90'; Dedechko 99' (pen.)	Report	Mailson 60'

FFA Academy Stadium, Yerevan
Attendance: 0 (Note: The match was played behind closed doors due to the COVID-19 pandemic in Armenia.)
Referee: Ashot Ghaltakchyan

Noah	Ararat-Armenia

GK	77	(Italy) Valerio Vimercati	(yellow card) 108'
DF	5	(Russia) Vladislav Kryuchkov
DF	14	(Russia) Mikhail Kovalenko	(yellow card) 14'
DF	92	(Guinea-Bissau) Saná Gomes		(substituted off) 63'
MF	7	(Latvia) Eduards Emsis	(yellow card) 22'	(substituted off) 75'
MF	10	(Armenia) Benik Hovhannisyan		(substituted off) 75'
MF	11	(Armenia) Artyom Simonyan		(substituted off) 64'
MF	57	(Russia) Pavel Deobald
MF	69	(Ukraine) Denys Dedechko	(yellow card) 57'
MF	94	(Moldova) Dan Spătaru
MF	97	(Russia) Kirill Bor		(substituted off) 116'
Substitutes:
GK	13	(Armenia) Samvel Hunanyan
GK	37	(Russia) Maksim Shvagirev
DF	2	(Armenia) Vardan Shakhbazyan
DF	3	(Russia) Alan Tatayev
DF	4	(Armenia) Jordy Monroy		(substituted in) 63'
MF	8	(Armenia) Yuri Gareginyan	(yellow card) 114'	(substituted in) 75'
MF	16	(Guinea-Bissau) Helistano Manga	(yellow card) 91'	(substituted in) 75'
MF	17	(Russia) Nikita Dubchak		(substituted in) 116'
DF	22	(Armenia) Vardan Movsisyan
DF	23	(Armenia) Artur Stepanyan
FW	31	(Russia) Dmitri Lavrishchev		(substituted in) 64'
DF	99	(Armenia) Arman Mkrtchyan
Manager:
(Moldova) Vladimir Japalau

GK	44	(Serbia) Stefan Čupić
DF	2	(Brazil) Alemão		(substituted off) 63'
DF	6	(Spain) David Bollo	(red card) 115'
DF	21	(North Macedonia) Aleksandar Damčevski		(substituted off) 46'
MF	5	(Armenia) Sargis Shahinyan		(substituted off) 46'
MF	22	(Ukraine) Yehor Klymenchuk		(substituted off) 97'
MF	63	(Ivory Coast) Kódjo
MF	79	(Ukraine) Serhiy Vakulenko		(substituted off) 46'
MF	94	(Cape Verde) Mailson Lima
FW	17	(Burkina Faso) Zakaria Sanogo		(substituted off) 80'
FW	24	(Nigeria) Yusuf Otubanjo
Substitutes:
GK	1	(Armenia) Suren Aloyan
DF	3	(Portugal) Ângelo Meneses		(substituted in) 89'
DF	4	(Armenia) Albert Khachumyan
MF	7	(Armenia) Armen Nahapetyan
MF	8	(France) Yoan Gouffran	(yellow card) 120'	(substituted in) 89'
MF	10	(Russia) Armen Ambartsumyan		(substituted in) 89'
MF	11	(Armenia) Hovhannes Harutyunyan		(substituted in) 89'
MF	23	(Armenia) Aram Khamoyan
MF	67	(Estonia) Ilja Antonov
MF	77	(Armenia) Artur Serobyan
DF	93	(Haiti) Alex Christian		(substituted in) 60'
FW	99	(Nigeria) Ogana Louis		(substituted in) 60'
Manager:
(Spain) David Campaña

Assistant referees:
Atom Sevgulyan
Harutyun Hambardzumyan
Fourth official:
Henrik Nalbandyan

== See also ==
- 2019–20 Armenian Premier League
- 2019–20 Armenian Cup
