= Jordy Monroy =

Armenian footballer (born 1996)

Personal information
- Full name: Jordy Joao Monroy Ararat
- Date of birth: 3 January 1996 (age 30)
- Place of birth: Bogotá, Colombia
- Height: 1.85 m (6 ft 1 in)
- Positions: Right-back; right midfielder

Team information
- Current team: Deportivo Pereira (on loan from Santa Fe)
- Number: 27

Senior career*
Years	Team	Apps	(Gls)
2015–2016	Santa Fe	8	(0)
2017–2020	Boyacá Chicó	89	(2)
2020–2022	Noah	54	(1)
2022–2023	DIM	32	(0)
2023–2024	Deportivo Pereira	36	(0)
2024–	Santa Fe	34	(0)
2025–	→ Deportivo Pereira (loan)	14	(0)

International career^{‡}
2018–2022	Armenia	8	(0)
- * Club domestic league appearances and goals as of 12 December 2025 ‡ National team caps and goals as of 22 July 2024

Jordy Joao Monroy Ararat (Armenian: Ժորդի Ժոաո Մոնրոյ Արարատ; born 3 January 1996) is a professional footballer who plays as a right-back or right midfielder for Colombian club Deportivo Pereira, on loan from Santa Fe. Born in Colombia, he played for the Armenia national team.

== Club career ==
Born in Bogotá, Monroy played from the age of 11 in the youth system of his hometown club Independiente Santa Fe. He made his debut on 1 November 2015 in Categoría Primera A, starting in a 1–1 home draw with Envigado. He totalled nine competitive appearances for the club, filling in when the regulars were rested ahead of continental fixtures, and was released in January 2016.

Following his release, he had an unsuccessful trial with a French Ligue 2 club, Patriotas Boyacá and a farm team of América de Cali, before becoming an Uber driver. He then had a choice between signing for Boyacá Chicó or Cúcuta Deportivo and chose the former, whom he helped win Categoría Primera B in 2017.

Boyacá Chicó were relegated back to the second tier at the end of the 2018 season. On 27 August 2019, Monroy scored his first senior goal to open a 3–2 home win over Cortuluá.

On 21 July 2020, Armenian Premier League club FC Noah announced the signing of Monroy. On 5 July 2022, Noah announced that Monroy had left the club after his contract had expired.

On 19 July 2022, Monroy returned to his homeland and signed a one-year contract with DIM.

In June 2023 he joined Deportivo Pereira.

== International career ==
Being an Afro-Colombian, Monroy qualified to play for Armenia through his mother Lucelia, who is an Armenian national of African-American heritage. He was called up for the first time in May 2018 ahead of friendlies against Malta and Moldova, and debuted against the former in a 1–1 draw on 29 May.

== Career statistics ==
=== Club ===
As of match played 25 May 2022

Appearances and goals by club, season and competition
Club	Season	League			National cup		Continental		Other		Total	
Club	Season	Division	Apps	Goals	Apps	Goals	Apps	Goals	Apps	Goals	Apps	Goals
Santa Fe	2015	Categoría Primera A	6	0	0	0	–		–		6	0
Santa Fe	2016	Categoría Primera A	2	0	1	0	–		–		3	0
Santa Fe	Total		8	0	1	0	0	0	0	0	9	0
Boyacá Chicó	2017	Categoría Primera B	16	0	0	0	–		–		16	0
Boyacá Chicó	2018	Categoría Primera A	28	0	2	0	–		–		30	0
Boyacá Chicó	2019	Categoría Primera B	38	2	4	0	–		–		42	2
Boyacá Chicó	2020	Categoría Primera A	7	0	0	0	–		–		7	0
Boyacá Chicó	Total		87	2	6	0	0	0	0	0	93	2
Noah	2020–21	Armenian Premier League	23	1	4	0	0 (Note: Appearances in the UEFA Europa League)	0	1 (Note: Appearance in Armenian Super Cup)	0	28	1
Noah	2021–22	Armenian Premier League	31	0	1	0	2 (Note: Appearances in the UEFA Europa Conference League)	0	–		34	0
Noah	Total		54	1	5	0	2	0	1	0	62	1
Career total			149	3	12	0	2	0	1	0	164	3

=== International ===
As of match played 27 September 2022

Appearances and goals by national team and year
National team	Year	Apps	Goals
Armenia	2018	2	0
Armenia	2019	0	0
Armenia	2020	0	0
Armenia	2021	2	0
Armenia	2022	4	0
Total		8	0

== Honours ==
Noah

- Armenian Supercup: 2020

Santa Fe

- Primera A: 2025-I
