= Benik Hovhannisyan =

Armenian footballer

Personal information
- Date of birth: 1 May 1993 (age 33)
- Place of birth: Yerevan, Armenia
- Height: 1.76 m (5 ft 9 in)
- Position: Midfielder

Team information
- Current team: Van
- Number: 10

Senior career*
Years	Team	Apps	(Gls)
2010–2013	Banants	23	(1)
2013–2015	Alashkert	2	(0)
2015–2016	Ararat Yerevan	23	(2)
2016–2019	Alashkert	5	(0)
2019–2022	Noah	61	(2)
2022	Van	11	(0)
2022–2023	Alashkert	10	(0)
2023–2024	Van	34	(2)
2024–2025	Alashkert	22	(1)
2025–	Van	21	(2)

International career^{‡}
2012	Armenia U19	3	(0)
2013	Armenia U21	1	(0)
2016	Armenia	1	(0)
- * Club domestic league appearances and goals as of 18 June 2026 ‡ National team caps and goals as of 26 September 2020

Benik Hovhannisyan (Armenian: Բենիկ Հովհաննիսյան; born 1 May 1993) is an Armenian professional footballer who plays as a midfielder for Armenian Premier League club Van.

== Career ==
One of his goals was scored in the last round in the 2015–16 Armenian Premier League for FC Ararat Yerevan in a pulsating 1–2 loss to Shirak.

== Career statistics ==
=== Club ===
As of match played 22 September 2020

Appearances and goals by club, season and competition
Club	Season	League			National Cup		Continental		Other		Total	
Club	Season	Division	Apps	Goals	Apps	Goals	Apps	Goals	Apps	Goals	Apps	Goals
Banants	2010	Armenian Premier League	1	0	0	0	—		—		1	0
Banants	2011	Armenian Premier League	17	0	2	0	1 (Note: Appearances in the UEFA Europa League)	0	1 (Note: Appearances in Armenian Supercup)	0	21	0
Banants	2012–13	Armenian Premier League	5	1	0	0	—		—		5	1
Banants	Total		23	1	2	0	1	0	1	0	27	1
Alashkert	2013–14	Armenian Premier League	0	0	0	0	—		—		0	0
Alashkert	2014–15	Armenian Premier League	2	0	0	0	—		—		2	0
Alashkert	Total		2	0	0	0	-	-	-	-	2	0
Ararat Yerevan	2015–16	Armenian Premier League	23	2	2	0	—		—		25	2
Alashkert	2016–17	Armenian Premier League	3	0	0	0	0 (Note: Appearances in the UEFA Champions League)	0	0	0	3	0
Alashkert	2017–18	Armenian Premier League	2	0	0	0	0	0	0	0	2	0
Alashkert	2018–19	Armenian Premier League	0	0	0	0	0 (Note: Appearances in the UEFA Champions League & UEFA Europa League)	0	1	0	1	0
Alashkert	Total		5	0	0	0	0	0	1	0	6	0
Noah	2018–19	Armenian Premier League	13	0	0	0	—		—		13	0
Noah	2019–20	Armenian Premier League	18	0	3	1	—		—		21	1
Noah	2020–21	Armenian Premier League	4	1	0	0	1	0	1	0	6	1
Noah	Total		35	1	3	1	1	0	1	0	40	2
Career total			88	4	7	1	2	0	3	0	100	5

=== International ===
Armenia national team
Year	Apps	Goals
2016	1	0
Total	1	0

Statistics accurate as of match played 28 May 2016

== Honours ==
=== Club ===
Noah

- Armenian Supercup: 2020
