= Yaroslav Matviyenko =

Russian footballer

Personal information
- Full name: Yaroslav Yuryevich Matviyenko
- Date of birth: 22 March 1998 (age 28)
- Place of birth: Krasnoyarsk, Russia
- Height: 1.72 m (5 ft 8 in)
- Position: Midfielder

Youth career
- Yenisey Krasnoyarsk

Senior career*
Years	Team	Apps	(Gls)
2018–2020	Yenisey Krasnoyarsk	4	(0)
2021–2022	Noah	9	(2)
2022–2023	West Armenia	10	(2)
2023	Torpedo Miass	23	(3)
2024	Ryazan	3	(0)
2024	Rubin Yalta	1	(0)
2025	Legion Makhachkala	14	(0)
- * Club domestic league appearances and goals as of 1 November 2025

Yaroslav Yuryevich Matviyenko (Russian: Ярослав Юрьевич Матвиенко; born 22 March 1998) is a Russian football player.

== Club career ==
He made his debut in the Russian Football National League for Yenisey Krasnoyarsk on 10 August 2019 in a game against Neftekhimik Nizhnekamsk.

On 2 February 2021, Armenian Premier League club FC Noah announced the signing of Matviyenko. After nine appearances and two goals, Matviyenko left Noah on 27 July 2022.
