= Vladimir Azarov =

Russian footballer

Personal information
- Full name: Vladimir Alekseyevich Azarov
- Date of birth: 19 March 1994 (age 32)
- Place of birth: Novosibirsk, Russia
- Height: 1.73 m (5 ft 8 in)
- Positions: Midfielder; forward

Team information
- Current team: Sokol Saratov
- Number: 99

Senior career*
| Years | Team | Apps | (Gls) |
| 2011–2012 | Akademiya Tolyatti | 28 | (0) |
| 2013 | Sibir-2 Novosibirsk | 10 | (1) |
| 2013–2019 | Sibir Novosibirsk | 143 | (2) |
| 2015–2016 | → Sibir-2 Novosibirsk (loan) | 13 | (3) |
| 2019–2021 | Noah | 41 | (14) |
| 2021–2023 | Akron Tolyatti | 69 | (5) |
| 2023–2024 | Sokol Saratov | 12 | (1) |
| 2024 | Irtysh Omsk | 0 | (0) |
| 2024–2026 | Tekstilshchik Ivanovo | 58 | (14) |
| 2026– | Sokol Saratov | 17 | (2) |

International career
| 2010 | Russia U-17 | 1 | (0) |
- * Club domestic league appearances and goals as of 15 November 2026

Vladimir Alekseyevich Azarov (Russian: Владимир Алексеевич Азаров; born 19 March 1994) is a Russian football player who plays for Sokol Saratov.

== Club career ==
He made his debut in the Russian Second Division for Akademiya Tolyatti on 4 August 2011 in a game against Rubin-2 Kazan.

He made his Russian Football National League debut for Sibir Novosibirsk on 13 July 2013 in a game against Arsenal Tula.

== Career statistics ==
=== Club ===
As of match played 28 May 2021

Appearances and goals by club, season and competition
| Club | Season | League | | | National Cup | | Continental | | Other | | Total | |
| Club | Season | Division | Apps | Goals | Apps | Goals | Apps | Goals | Apps | Goals | Apps | Goals |
|---|---|---|---|---|---|---|---|---|---|---|---|---|
| Akademiya Tolyatti | 2011–12 | Second Division | 11 | 0 | 0 | 0 | — | | — | | 11 | 0 |
| Akademiya Tolyatti | 2012–13 | Second Division | 16 | 0 | 1 | 0 | — | | — | | 17 | 0 |
| Akademiya Tolyatti | Total | | 27 | 0 | 1 | 0 | - | - | - | - | 28 | 0 |
| Sibir-2 Novosibirsk (loan) | 2012–13 | Second Division | 10 | 1 | — | | — | | — | | 10 | 1 |
| Sibir Novosibirsk | 2013–14 | RFNL | 12 | 0 | 1 | 0 | — | | — | | 13 | 0 |
| Sibir Novosibirsk | 2014–15 | RFNL | 9 | 0 | 0 | 0 | — | | — | | 9 | 0 |
| Sibir Novosibirsk | 2015–16 | RFNL | 18 | 0 | 1 | 0 | — | | — | | 19 | 0 |
| Sibir Novosibirsk | 2016–17 | RFNL | 33 | 0 | 2 | 0 | — | | — | | 35 | 0 |
| Sibir Novosibirsk | 2017–18 | RFNL | 34 | 2 | 1 | 0 | — | | — | | 35 | 2 |
| Sibir Novosibirsk | 2018–19 | RFNL | 37 | 0 | 0 | 0 | — | | — | | 37 | 0 |
| Sibir Novosibirsk | Total | | 143 | 2 | 5 | 0 | - | - | - | - | 148 | 2 |
| Sibir-2 Novosibirsk | 2015–16 | RPFL | 13 | 3 | — | | — | | — | | 13 | 3 |
| Noah | 2019–20 | Armenian Premier League | 24 | 8 | 5 | 2 | — | | — | | 29 | 10 |
| Noah | 2020–21 | Armenian Premier League | 16 | 6 | 4 | 1 | 1 (Note: Appearance in the UEFA Europa League) | 0 | 0 (Note: Appearance in the Armenian Supercup) | 0 | 21 | 7 |
| Noah | Total | | 40 | 14 | 9 | 3 | 1 | 0 | 0 | 0 | 50 | 17 |
| Career total | | | 233 | 20 | 15 | 3 | 1 | 0 | 0 | 0 | 249 | 23 |

== Honours and achievements ==
=== Club ===
FC Noah

- Armenian Cup (1): 2019–20
