= Dobrivoje Velemir =

Serbian football player

Personal information
- Full name: Dobrivoje Velemir
- Date of birth: 14 March 1997 (age 29)
- Place of birth: Novi Sad, FR Yugoslavia
- Height: 1.78 m (5 ft 10 in)
- Position: Left winger

Youth career
- –2012: Bačka
- 2012–2015: Vojvodina
- 2015–2016: AEK Athens

Senior career*
Years	Team	Apps	(Gls)
2016–2017	Sloboda Užice	17	(0)
2017–2018	Cement Beočin	25	(2)
2018–2019	Kabel		
2019–2020	Cement Beočin		
2020–2021	Bačka	21	(2)
2021	Noah	7	(0)
2022	Tekstilac Odžaci	0	(0)
- * Club domestic league appearances and goals as of 1 January 2022

Dobrivoje Velemir (Serbian Cyrillic: Добривоје Велемир; born 14 March 1997) is a Serbian football winger who most recently played for Tekstilac Odžaci.

== Career ==
On 29 January 2021, Velemir signed for Noah, leaving the club on 21 December 2021.

== Honours ==
Individual

- Serbian SuperLiga Player of the Week: 2020–21 (Round 17)
