= Saná Gomes (footballer, born 1999) =

Bissau-Guinean footballer

Personal information
- Date of birth: 10 October 1999 (age 27)
- Place of birth: Bissau, Guinea-Bissau
- Height: 1.74 m (5 ft 9 in)
- Position: Left-back

Team information
- Current team: Hapoel Haifa
- Number: 92

Youth career
- 2010–2013: Fontainhas
- 2013–2014: Estoril
- 2014–2015: Chaves
- 2015–2016: Leiria

Senior career*
| Years | Team | Apps | (Gls) |
| 2016–2017 | Leiria | 1 | (0) |
| 2017–2019 | Braga | 0 | (0) |
| 2017–2018 | → Montalegre (loan) | 3 | (0) |
| 2018 | → 1º Dezembro (loan) | 7 | (1) |
| 2019–2020 | Sertanense | 19 | (0) |
| 2020–2022 | Noah | 44 | (2) |
| 2022–2023 | Debrecen | 4 | (0) |
| 2023 | → Beroe Stara Zagora (loan) | 14 | (0) |
| 2023 | Belenenses | 7 | (0) |
| 2024 | Anadia | 6 | (0) |
| 2024–2025 | Omonia Aradippou | 24 | (0) |
| 2025– | Hapoel Haifa | 24 | (0) |

International career^{‡}
| 2022– | Guinea-Bissau | 4 | (0) |
- * Club domestic league appearances and goals as of 24 June 2026 ‡ National team caps and goals as of 13 July 2023

Saná Gomes (born 10 October 1999) is a Bissau-Guinean professional footballer who plays as a left-back for Israeli club Hapoel Haifa and the Guinea-Bissau national team.

== Club career ==
Gomes is a youth product of the academies of Fontainhas, Estoril, Chaves, and Leiria. He began his senior career with Leiria in 2016. He moved to Braga in 2017, and had short loan stints with Montalegre and 1º Dezembro before moving to Sertanense in 2019. He moved to Armenia with Noah in 2020. Gomes made his professional debut with Noah in a 4–2 Armenian Premier League win over Pyunik on 7 March 2020.

On 30 January 2023, Saná joined Bulgarian side Beroe Stara Zagora on loan until the end of the 2022–23 season.

On 8 July 2023, Saná signed a one-year contract with recently promoted Liga Portugal 2 side Belenenses. Five months later, the club terminated his contract.

== International career ==
Gomes debuted with Guinea-Bissau in a friendly 3–0 win over Equatorial Guinea on 23 March 2022.

== Honour ==
Noah

- Armenian Cup: 2019–20
- Armenian Supercup: 2020
