= Andrei Titov =

Russian footballer

Personal information
- Full name: Andrei Alekseyevich Titov
- Date of birth: 5 March 1996 (age 30)
- Place of birth: Ulyanovsk, Russia
- Height: 1.89 m (6 ft 2 1/2 in)
- Position: Forward

Youth career
- –2007: Energiya-Zarya Ulyanovsk
- 2008–2013: Konoplyov football academy
- 2013: Spartak Moscow
- 2013: Krylia Sovetov

Senior career*
Years	Team	Apps	(Gls)
2013–2014	Krylia Sovetov	0	(0)
2014	FC Vityaz-M Podolsk		
2015–2017	Metallurg Lipetsk	39	(7)
2017–2018	Khimki	10	(0)
2018	Khimki-M	1	(0)
2018	Dnepr Smolensk	6	(2)
2019–2021	Akron Tolyatti	26	(4)
2020	→ Tyumen (loan)	5	(0)
2021–2022	Noah	10	(0)
- * Club domestic league appearances and goals

Andrei Alekseyevich Titov (Russian: Андрей Алексеевич Титов; born 5 March 1996) is a Russian former professional footballer.

== Club career ==
He made his debut in the Russian Professional Football League for FC Metallurg Lipetsk on 20 July 2015 in a game against FC Avangard Kursk.

He made his Russian Football National League debut for FC Khimki on 5 August 2017 in a game against FC Tom Tomsk.

On 18 June 2022, Noah announced that Titov had left the club.
