= David Bollo =

Spanish footballer

Personal information
- Full name: David Humanes Muñoz
- Date of birth: 13 November 1996 (age 30)
- Place of birth: Arahal, Spain
- Height: 1.85 m (6 ft 1 in)
- Position: Centre-back

Youth career
- Sevilla
- –2014: Real Zaragoza

Senior career*
Years	Team	Apps	(Gls)
2014	Real Zaragoza	4	(0)
2014–2015	Real Zaragoza B	7	(0)
2015–2017	Atlético Malagueño	0	(0)
2017–2018	UD Logroñés B	0	(0)
2018–2019	AD San Juan de Mozarrifar	0	(0)
2019–2020	Slavia Sofia	14	(0)
2020	Academica Clinceni	11	(0)
2020–2021	Ararat-Armenia	20	(2)
2021–2024	Antequera	71	(3)
2024–2025	Inter Kashi	16	(1)
2025–2026	Inter Club d'Escaldes	0	(0)
2026	Inter Kashi	7	(0)
- * Club domestic league appearances and goals as of 15:22, 18 August 2025 (UTC)

David Humanes Muñoz (born 13 November 1996), commonly known as David Bollo, is a Spanish professional footballer who plays as a centre-back.

== Career ==
=== Ararat-Armenia ===
On 5 August 2020, Armenian champions Ararat-Armenia announced the signing of Bollo. On 3 June 2021, Bollo left Ararat-Armenia after his contract expired.

=== Inter Kashi ===
He joined the I-League club Inter Kashi FC on 12 September 2024.

== Career statistics ==
=== Club ===
As of match played till 3 May 2025

Appearances and goals by club, season and competition
Club	Season	League			National Cup		Continental		Other		Total	
Club	Season	Division	Apps	Goals	Apps	Goals	Apps	Goals	Apps	Goals	Apps	Goals
Real Zaragoza	2014–15	Segunda División	3	0	1 (Note: Appearance in 2014–15 Copa del Rey)	0	–		–		4	0
Real Zaragoza B	2014–15	Segunda División B	7	0	–		–		–		7	0
Slavia Sofia	2018–19	Efbet Liga	9	0	–		–		–		9	0
Slavia Sofia	2019–20	Efbet Liga	4	0	1 (Note: Appearance in 2019–20 Bulgarian Cup)	0	–		–		5	0
Slavia Sofia	Total		13	0	1	0	-		-		14	0
Academica Clinceni	2019–20	Liga I	11	0	–		–		–		11	0
Ararat-Armenia	2020–21	APL	15	2	2 (Note: Appearance in 2020 Armenian Supercup) (Note: Appearance in 2020–21 Armenian Cup)	0	3 (Note: Appearance in 2020–21 UEFA Champions League) (Note: Appearance in 2020–21 UEFA Europa League)	0	–		20	2
Antequera CF	2021–22	Segunda Federación	26	0	–		–		–		26	0
Antequera CF	2022–23	Segunda Federación	21	2	–		–		–		21	2
Antequera CF	2023–24	Primera Federación	23	1	1 (Note: Appearance in 2023–24 Copa del Rey)	0	–		–		24	1
Antequera CF	Total		70	3	1	0	-		-		71	3
Inter Kashi	2024–25	I-League	16	1	2 (Note: Appearance in 2025 Indian Super Cup)	0	–		–		18	1
Career total			135	6	7	0	3	0	-		145	6
