= Denys Dedechko =

Ukrainian footballer

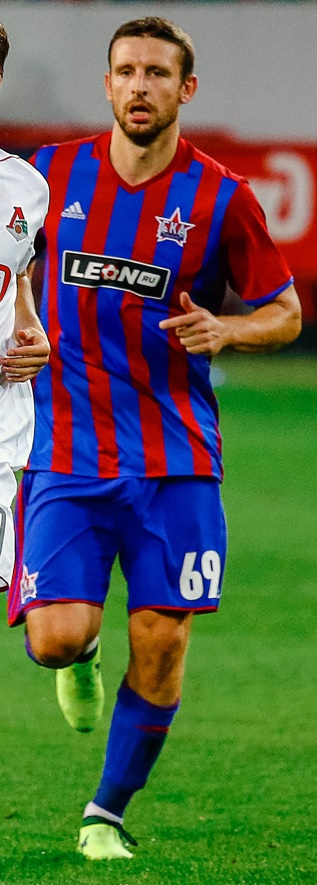
- Dedechko with SKA-Khabarovsk in 2017

Personal information
- Full name: Denys Mykhaylovych Dedechko
- Date of birth: 2 July 1987 (age 39)
- Place of birth: Kyiv, Ukrainian SSR, Soviet Union
- Height: 1.88 m (6 ft 2 in)
- Position: Midfielder

Youth career
- –2004: Dynamo Kyiv

Senior career*
Years	Team	Apps	(Gls)
2004–2005	Dynamo Kyiv	1	(0)
2004–2009	Dynamo-2 Kyiv	51	(6)
2007	→ Naftovyk Okhtyrka (loan)	10	(1)
2009	→ Luch-Energiya (loan)	32	(9)
2010	Amkar Perm	5	(0)
2010–2011	Krasnodar	18	(3)
2011–2012	Luch-Energiya	21	(4)
2012–2013	Kryvbas Kryvyi Rih	24	(1)
2013–2015	Vorskla Poltava	46	(6)
2015	Astana	10	(1)
2016	Oleksandriya	3	(1)
2016–2017	SKA-Khabarovsk	50	(5)
2018	Mariupol	11	(0)
2018	SKA-Khabarovsk	23	(3)
2019	Oleksandriya	8	(0)
2019–2020	Ararat Yerevan	20	(6)
2020–2022	Noah	29	(0)
2022	Narva Trans	31	(12)
2023–2024	Zimbru Chișinău	45	(8)
2025	Câmpulung Muscel	9	(0)
2025–2026	Van	8	(0)

International career
2002	Ukraine U15	3	(1)
2003	Ukraine U16	9	(1)
2003–2004	Ukraine U17	17	(4)
2003–2005	Ukraine U18	6	(2)
2005	Ukraine U19	4	(0)
2006–2008	Ukraine U21	4	(0)
2013	Ukraine	1	(0)
- * Club domestic league appearances and goals as of 2 February 2026

Denys Mykhaylovych Dedechko (Ukrainian: Денис Михайлович Дедечко; born 2 July 1987) is a Ukrainian professional footballer who plays as a midfielder, most recently for Armenian club Van .

== Career ==
On 17 June 2015, Dedechko signed a 2.5-year contract with Kazakhstan Premier League side FC Astana.

On 25 February 2016, Dedechko joined Ukrainian Premier League side FC Oleksandriya.

On 5 July 2019, Dedechko signed for Ararat Yerevan on a two-year contract.

On 16 July 2020, Dedechko signed for Noah, leaving the club on 11 December 2021.

On 4 February 2022, Narva Trans announced the signing of Dedechko.

On 8 August 2025, Dedechko returned to the Armenian Premier League, signing for Van. On 2 February 2026, Van announced that Dedechko had left the club after his contract was terminated by mutual agreement.

== Honours ==
Dynamo Kyiv

- Ukrainian Cup: 2005–06
- Ukrainian Super Cup: 2007

Astana

- Kazakhstan Premier League: 2015
- Kazakhstan Cup runner-up: 2015

Noah

- Armenian Supercup: 2020

Zimbru Chișinău

- Cupa Moldovei runner-up: 2023–24
