= Dan Spătaru (footballer) =

Moldovan footballer

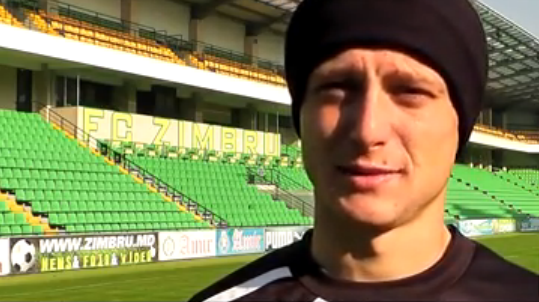
- Spătaru in 2014

Personal information
- Full name: Dan Spătaru
- Date of birth: 24 May 1994 (age 32)
- Place of birth: Chișinău, Moldova
- Height: 1.74 m (5 ft 8 1/2 in)
- Positions: Attacking midfielder; winger

Team information
- Current team: Neman Grodno
- Number: 33

Youth career
- Zimbru Chișinău

Senior career*
Years	Team	Apps	(Gls)
2012–2017	Zimbru Chișinău	100	(8)
2015	→ Astra Giurgiu (loan)	6	(0)
2017	Dinamo București	2	(0)
2017–2018	Politehnica Iași	12	(0)
2018	Nizhny Novgorod	12	(1)
2019	Liepāja	29	(1)
2020	Noah	23	(5)
2021	Ararat-Armenia	12	(0)
2022	Noah	15	(0)
2022	Milsami Orhei	4	(2)
2022	AGMK	6	(0)
2023	Milsami Orhei	10	(1)
2023–2024	Radunia Stężyca	17	(2)
2024–2025	Milsami Orhei	8	(3)
2025	Petrocub Hîncești	10	(0)
2025–2026	Spartanii Sportul	10	(2)
2026–	Neman Grodno	13	(4)

International career
2010	Moldova U17 (Note: Only official UEFA matches included)	3	(1)
2012	Moldova U19	3	(0)
2014–2016	Moldova U21	27	(5)
2014–2022	Moldova	22	(0)
- * Club domestic league appearances and goals as of 3 July 2026

Dan Spătaru (born 24 May 1994) is a Moldovan professional footballer who plays as an attacking midfielder or winger for Belarusian Premier League club Neman Grodno.

== Club career ==
In February 2015, Zimbru Chișinău loaned Spătaru to Romanian club Astra Giurgiu, until the end of the 2015–16 season.

He was permanently transferred to Romanian club Dinamo București, on 28 February 2017.

In July 2017, after his contract with Dinamo was terminated, Spătaru signed with another Liga I team: Politehnica Iași, on a two-year deal.

On 29 December 2020, Ararat-Armenia announced the signing of Spătaru on a free-transfer after his FC Noah contract expired. On 9 January 2021, Ararat-Armenia announced that Spătaru had left the club after his contract had expired. On 1 February 2022, Spătaru returned to FC Noah.

== Honours ==
Zimbru Chișinău

- Moldovan Cup: 2013–14
- Moldovan Super Cup: 2014

Dinamo București

- Cupa Ligii: 2016–17

Noah

- Armenian Cup: 2019–20
- Armenian Supercup: 2020
