= Dmitri Lavrishchev =

Russian footballer

Personal information
- Full name: Dmitri Sergeyevich Lavrishchev
- Date of birth: 23 December 1998 (age 27)
- Place of birth: Yelets, Lipetsk Oblast, Russia
- Height: 1.78 m (5 ft 10 in)
- Position: Forward

Team information
- Current team: KDV Tomsk
- Number: 23

Senior career*
Years	Team	Apps	(Gls)
2016–2017	Yelets (amateur)		
2017	FC Metallurg-OEMK Stary Oskol		
2018–2019	Rotor Volgograd	1	(0)
2018–2019	→ Rotor-2 Volgograd	33	(15)
2019–2020	Noah	34	(3)
2021	Lokomotiv Gomel	31	(9)
2022	Noah	14	(1)
2022	Kuban-Holding Pavlovskaya	18	(9)
2023	Forte Taganrog	25	(14)
2024–2025	Rotor Volgograd	46	(7)
2026–	KDV Tomsk	18	(2)
- * Club domestic league appearances and goals as of 1 November 2026

Dmitri Sergeyevich Lavrishchev (Russian: Дмитрий Сергеевич Лаврищев; born 23 December 1998) is a Russian football player who plays for KDV Tomsk.

== Club career ==
He made his debut in the Russian Professional Football League for FC Rotor-2 Volgograd on 6 April 2018, in a game against FC Dynamo Bryansk.

Lavrishchev only made a single appearance with Rotor's parent club before leaving at the end of the 2018–19 season.

== Honours ==
=== Individual ===
- Russian Professional Football League Zone Center best young player (2018–19).

== Club honors ==
Noah

- Armenian Cup: 2019–20
- Armenian Supercup: 2020
