= Vladislav Kryuchkov =

Russian footballer

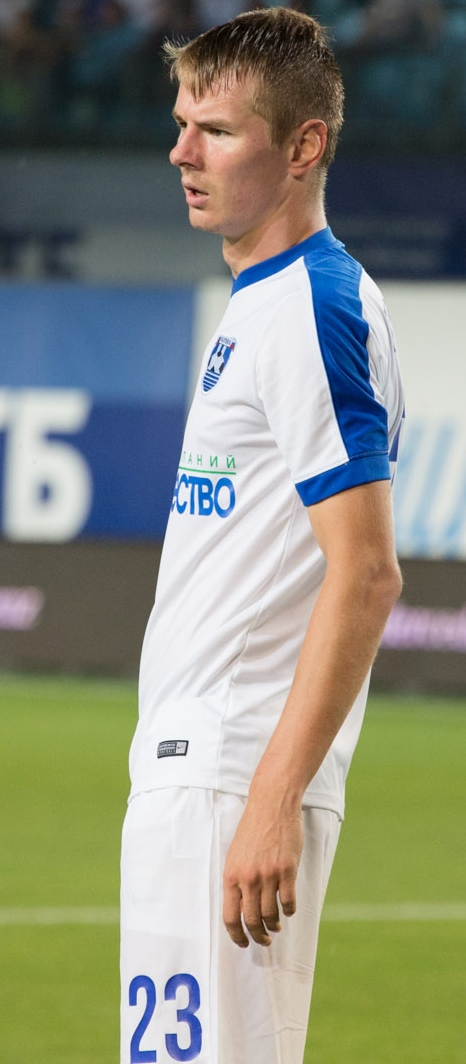
- Kryuchkov with Baltika in 2016

Personal information
- Full name: Vladislav Yuryevich Kryuchkov
- Date of birth: 24 August 1989 (age 37)
- Place of birth: Kaliningrad, Russian SFSR
- Height: 1.87 m (6 ft 1 1/2 in)
- Position: Defender

Senior career*
| Years | Team | Apps | (Gls) |
| 2007 | Baltika-2 Kaliningrad | 28 | (0) |
| 2008 | Ventspils | 0 | (0) |
| 2009–2010 | Istra | 28 | (4) |
| 2010 | Ventspils | 11 | (0) |
| 2011–2014 | Baltika Kaliningrad | 84 | (1) |
| 2014 | SKA-Energiya Khabarovsk | 5 | (0) |
| 2015 | Kaluga | 8 | (0) |
| 2016–2019 | Baltika Kaliningrad | 61 | (2) |
| 2019–2021 | Noah | 7 | (1) |
| 2021 | Alashkert | 11 | (0) |
| 2022 | Forte Taganrog | 16 | (0) |

International career
| 2008 | Russia U-19 | 8 | (0) |
- * Club domestic league appearances and goals

Vladislav Yuryevich Kryuchkov (Russian: Владислав Юрьевич Крючков; born 24 August 1989) is a Russian former professional footballer.

== Club career ==
He played 7 seasons in the Russian Football National League for FC Baltika Kaliningrad and FC SKA-Khabarovsk.

== Club honors ==
Noah

- Armenian Cup: 2019–20
- Armenian Supercup: 2020
