= Helistano Manga =

Bissau-Guinean footballer (born 1999)

Personal information
- Full name: Helistano Ciro Manga
- Date of birth: 20 May 1999 (age 27)
- Place of birth: Guinea Bissau
- Position: Midfielder

Team information
- Current team: Kormákur/Hvöt

Senior career*
Years	Team	Apps	(Gls)
2018–2020	Leiria	22	(2)
2020–2021	Noah	27	(0)
2021–2022	Rodos	0	(0)
2022	Olympiacos Volos	17	(0)
2022–2023	Ferizaj	1	(0)
2023	FC Jazz	4	
2024	Grobiņas	6	(0)
2025–	Kormákur/Hvöt	11	(2)
- * Club domestic league appearances and goals as of 24 July 2025

Helistano Ciro Manga (born 20 May 1999) is a Bissau-Guinean footballer who also holds Portuguese citizenship. He currently plays for Icelandic side Kormákur/Hvöt.

== Club honors ==
Noah

- Armenian Cup: 2019–20
- Armenian Supercup: 2020
