= Pavel Deobald =

Russian footballer

Personal information
- Full name: Pavel Aleksandrovich Deobald
- Date of birth: 25 June 1990 (age 36)
- Place of birth: Moscow, Russian SFSR
- Height: 1.80 m (5 ft 11 in)
- Position: Midfielder

Senior career*
Years	Team	Apps	(Gls)
2008–2009	Lokomotiv Moscow	0	(0)
2010	Lokomotiv-2 Moscow	1	(0)
2011–2012	Istra	39	(5)
2012	Lokomotiv-2 Moscow	16	(1)
2013–2015	Shinnik Yaroslavl	68	(10)
2015–2016	Arsenal Tula	16	(1)
2016	→ Torpedo Armavir (loan)	13	(1)
2016–2017	Mordovia Saransk	29	(5)
2017–2018	Tom Tomsk	31	(0)
2018–2019	Shinnik Yaroslavl	26	(2)
2019–2021	Noah	28	(2)
2021	Turan	20	(1)
- * Club domestic league appearances and goals

Pavel Aleksandrovich Deobald (Russian: Павел Александрович Деобальд; born 25 June 1990) is a Russian former professional football player.

== Club career ==
He made his Russian Football National League debut for FC Shinnik Yaroslavl on 8 April 2013 in a game against FC Khimki.

On 23 June 2018, he returned to FC Shinnik Yaroslavl.

== International ==
He represented Russia at the 2009 Maccabiah Games.

== Club honors ==
Noah

- Armenian Cup: 2019–20
- Armenian Supercup: 2020
