= Yuri Gareginyan =

Armenian footballer

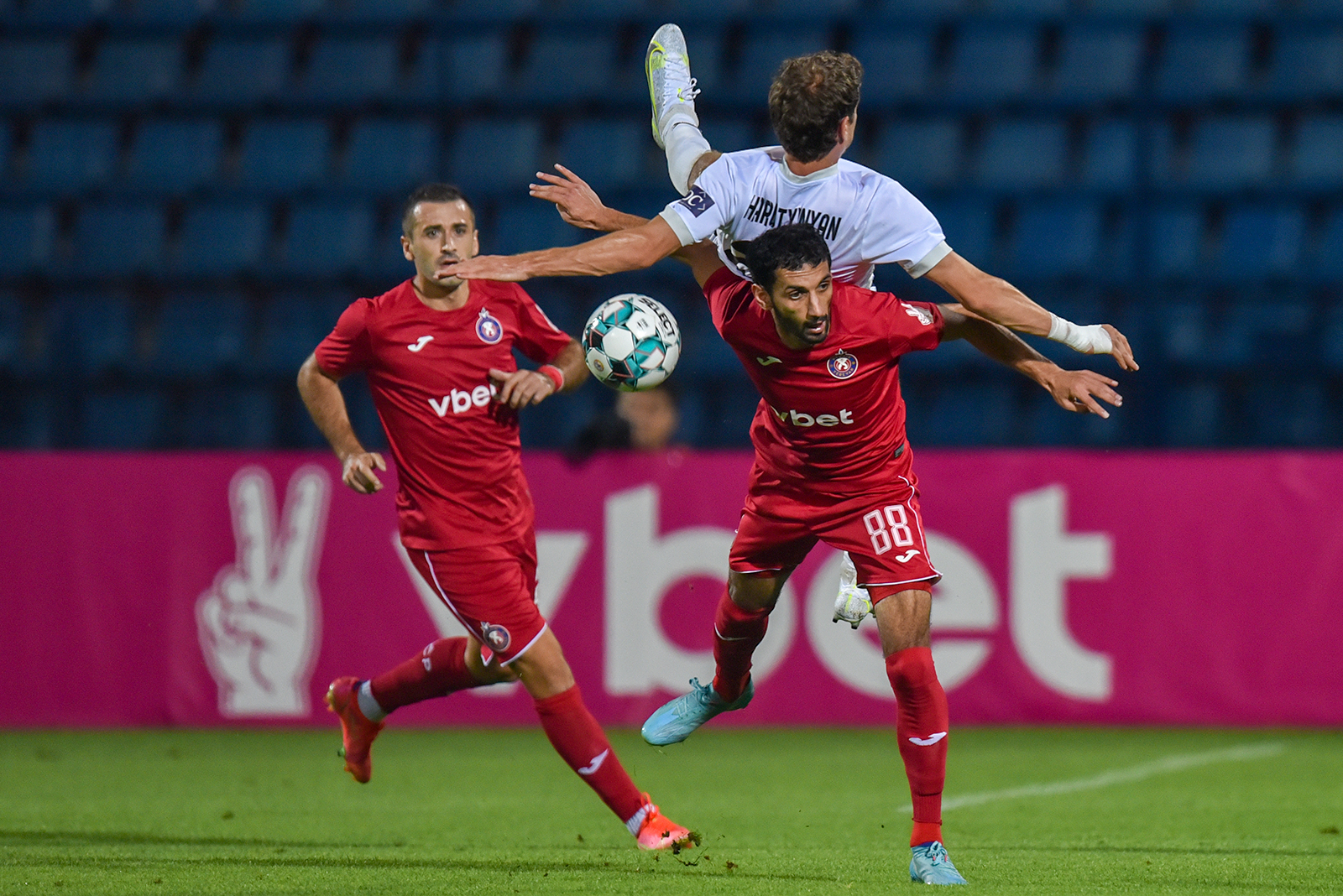
- Gareginyan with Pyunik in 2022

Personal information
- Date of birth: 3 February 1994 (age 32)
- Place of birth: Yerevan, Armenia
- Height: 1.78 m (5 ft 10 in)
- Position: Midfielder

Youth career
- Pyunik

Senior career*
Years	Team	Apps	(Gls)
2015–2017	Ararat Yerevan-2	6	(1)
2016–2018	Ararat Yerevan	50	(1)
2018–2021	Artsakh/Noah	47	(3)
2021–2023	Pyunik	38	(0)
2023–2024	Alashkert	18	(0)
2024–2025	Van	22	(0)
2025–2026	Alashkert	25	(0)

International career^{‡}
2020	Armenia	1	(0)
- * Club domestic league appearances and goals as of 28 June 2026 ‡ National team caps and goals as of 19:10, 11 October 2020 (UTC)

Yuri Gareginyan (Armenian: Յուրի Գարեգինյան; born 3 February 1994) is an Armenian former professional footballer who played as a midfielder.

== Club career ==
On 16 June 2023, Pyunik confirmed the departure of Gareginyan after two season with the club. On 29 June 2023, Alashkert announced the signing of Gareginyan.

On 9 June 2026, Alashkert announced the departure of Gareginyan from the club. 13 days later, on 22 June 2026, Gareginyan announced his retirement from football.

== International career ==
Gareginyan made his international debut for Armenia on 11 October 2020 in the UEFA Nations League, coming on as a 67th-minute substitute in the 2–2 draw at home against Georgia.

== Coaching career ==
On 25 June 2026, Gareginyan joined the coaching staff at Urartu.

== Career statistics ==
As of 11 October 2020

Armenia
Year	Apps	Goals
2020	1	0
Total	1	0

== Honours ==
Pyunik

- Armenian Premier League: 2021–22

Noah

- Armenian Cup: 2019–20
- Armenian Supercup: 2020
