= Valerio Vimercati =

Italian footballer (born 1995)

Personal information
- Date of birth: March 4, 1995 (age 31)
- Place of birth: Milan, Italy
- Height: 1.80 m (5 ft 11 in)
- Position: Goalkeeper

Senior career*
Years	Team	Apps	(Gls)
2012–2013	Pro Vercelli	0	(0)
2013	Spezia	0	(0)
2014–2015	Delta Porto Tolle	25	(0)
2015–2016	Caravaggio	14	(0)
2016–2018	Fátima	59	(0)
2019	União de Leiria	11	(0)
2019–2021	Noah	43	(0)
2021–2022	Ararat-Armenia	30	(0)
2023–2024	Noah	12	(0)
2024–2025	Alashkert	18	(0)
- * Club domestic league appearances and goals as of 1 June 2025

Valerio Vimercati (born 4 March 1995) is an Italian footballer who plays as a goalkeeper and is currently a free agent.

== Early life ==
Vimercati grew up in Milan, Italy. He joined the youth academy of Italian Serie A side Milan at the age of eight. He is a supporter of Italian Serie A side Milan.

== Club career ==
In 2012, Vimercati signed for Italian side Pro Vercelli. He suffered relegation while playing for the club. In 2013, he signed for Italian side Spezia. In 2014, he signed for Italian side Delta Porto Tolle. In 2015, he signed for Italian side Caravaggio. In 2016, he signed for Portuguese side Fátima. He helped the club achieve promotion. In 2019, he signed for Portuguese side União de Leiria. In 2019, he signed for Armenian side Noah. In 2021, he signed for Armenian side Ararat-Armenia. In 2023, he returned to Armenian side Noah.

== International career ==
Vimercati is eligible to represent Italy internationally, having been born in the country. He has expressed interest in playing for the Armenia national football team.

== Style of play ==
Vimercati operates as a goalkeeper. He has been described as "distinguished by reliable play and excellent saves".

== Personal life ==
Vimercati considered working as a goalkeeper coach in China. He was born to a Cameroonian mother and Italian father.
