= 2022–23 FC Noah season =

Noah
2022–23 season
- CEO: Artur Sahakyan
- Manager: Robert Arzumanyan
- Stadium: Armavir City Stadium
- Premier League: 8th
- Armenian Cup: Quarterfinal vs Pyunik
- Top goalscorer: League: Levon Vardanyan (8); All: Levon Vardanyan (8)
Home colours	Away colours	Third colours

The 2022–23 season was FC Noah's 5th season in Armenian Premier League.

== Season events ==
On 3 March, Noah announced the signing of Arman Simonyan who'd recently left Ararat Yerevan.

== Squad ==
As of match played 4 June 2023

Number	Name	Nationality	Position	Date of birth (age)	Signed from	Signed in	Contract ends	Apps.	Goals
Goalkeepers
1	Raul Bălbărău	(Romania)	GK	7 April 2001 (aged 22)	on loan from Debreceni	2023	2023	10	0
77	Arman Simonyan	(Armenia)	GK	28 July 1997 (aged 25)	Unattached	2023		1	0
99	Harutyun Melkonyan	(Armenia)	GK	28 June 2001 (aged 21)	on loan from Pyunik	2022		6	0
Defenders
2	Arsen Galstyan	(Armenia)	DF	1 May 2002 (aged 21)	BKMA Yerevan	2023		7	0
3	Karen Muradyan	(Armenia)	DF	1 April 2001 (aged 22)	on loan from Pyunik	2022		23	0
18	Okezie Prince Ebenezer	(Nigeria)	DF	28 February 2001 (aged 22)	Zimbru Chisinau	2022		38	0
25	Artur Danielyan	(Armenia)	DF	9 February 1998 (aged 25)	Panserraikos	2022		21	0
65	Gor Abrahamyan	(Armenia)	DF	7 December 2005 (aged 17)	Academy	2022		4	0
66	Sergey Muradyan	(Armenia)	DF	27 August 2004 (aged 18)	Zenit St.Petersburg	2023		14	0
Midfielders
6	Hayk Musakhanyan	(Belarus)	MF	20 March 1998 (aged 25)	Energetik-BGU Minsk	2022		42	1
11	Israel Opoku	(Ghana)	MF	10 May 2004 (aged 19)		2022		9	1
13	Robert Baghramyan	(Armenia)	MF	29 June 2002 (aged 20)	on loan from Urartu	2022		29	0
17	Friday Adams	(Nigeria)	MF	23 November 2002 (aged 20)	FDC Vista Gelendzhik	2022		35	2
20	Erjanik Ghubasaryan	(Armenia)	MF	21 February 2001 (aged 22)	BKMA Yerevan	2023		6	0
21	Haggai Katoh	(Nigeria)	MF	30 December 1998 (aged 24)	on loan from Plateau United	2023		13	0
22	Ruben Yesayan	(Armenia)	MF	14 February 2002 (aged 21)	on loan from Urartu	2022		35	3
23	Hayk Ghevondyan	(Armenia)	MF	1 July 2001 (aged 21)	on loan from Urartu	2022		23	1
26	Arsen Ayrapetyan	(Russia)	MF	16 February 1997 (aged 26)	on loan from Rodina Moscow	2022		28	0
33	Vahagn Hayrapetyan	(Armenia)	MF	14 June 1997 (aged 25)	Unattached	2022		19	0
Forwards
9	Levon Vardanyan	(Armenia)	FW	2 November 2003 (aged 19)	Pyunik	2022		34	8
10	Peter Olawale	(Nigeria)	FW	26 July 2002 (aged 20)	on loan from Debreceni	2023	2023	11	0
27	Samvel Hakobyan	(Armenia)	FW	30 April 2003 (aged 20)	Urartu	2022		12	0
28	Yeon-seung Kim	(South Korea)	FW	15 July 1999 (aged 23)	SC St. Tönis 11/20	2022		31	2
70	Alexandre Llovet	(France)	FW	26 November 1997 (aged 25)	Sète 34	2023		16	6
91	Goodnews Igbokwe	(Nigeria)	FW	26 February 2003 (aged 20)	Van	2022		24	6
Players away on loan
5	Norayr Nikoghosyan	(Armenia)	DF	9 March 2002 (aged 21)	Noravank	2022		13	0
Players who left during the season
7	Karen Nalbandyan	(Armenia)	MF	14 April 2002 (aged 21)	Noravank	2022		13	0
8	Dramane Salou	(Burkina Faso)	MF	22 May 1998 (aged 25)	Salitas	2022		33	4
10	Armen Nahapetyan	(Armenia)	MF	14 April 2002 (aged 21)	Ararat-Armenia	2022		8	0
20	Petros Afajanyan	(Armenia)	MF	31 October 1998 (aged 24)	Shirak	2022		10	1
21	Patvakan Avetisyan	(Armenia)	MF	24 August 2001 (aged 21)	on loan from Ararat-Armenia	2022		14	0
77	Vardan Shahatuni	(Armenia)	GK	13 March 1998 (aged 25)	Ararat-Armenia	2022		24	0
94	Arman Khachatryan	(Armenia)	DF	9 June 1997 (aged 25)	Noravank	2022		14	0
96	Anatoly Ayvazov	(Armenia)	GK	8 June 1996 (aged 26)	Urartu	2022		8	0
97	Aleksandr Nesterov	(Russia)	DF	24 March 2000 (aged 23)	Dynamo Stavropol	2022		9	0
	Ruben Hovsepyan	(Armenia)	DF	6 November 1999 (aged 23)	on loan from Ararat-Armenia	2022		0	0

== Transfers ==
=== In ===
Date	Position	Nationality	Name	From	Fee	Ref.
12 June 2022	MF	(Armenia)	Armen Nahapetyan	Ararat-Armenia	Undisclosed	
19 June 2022	FW	(Armenia)	Levon Vardanyan	Pyunik	Undisclosed	
25 June 2022	DF	(Armenia)	Norayr Nikoghosyan	Noravank	Undisclosed	
25 June 2022	MF	(Armenia)	Vahagn Hayrapetyan	Unattached	Free	
25 June 2022	MF	(Armenia)	Karen Nalbandyan	Noravank	Undisclosed	
29 June 2022	MF	(Armenia)	Arman Khachatryan	Noravank	Undisclosed	
29 June 2022	MF	(Nigeria)	Friday Adams	Vista Gelendzhik	Undisclosed	
15 July 2022	DF	(Russia)	Aleksandr Nesterov	Dynamo Stavropol	Undisclosed	
15 July 2022	MF	(Armenia)	Petros Afajanyan	Shirak	Undisclosed	
19 July 2022	DF	(Armenia)	Artur Danielyan	Panserraikos	Undisclosed	
31 July 2022	GK	(Armenia)	Anatoly Ayvazov	Urartu	Undisclosed	
5 August 2022	FW	(Armenia)	Samvel Hakobyan	Urartu	Undisclosed	
8 August 2022	MF	(South Korea)	Yeon-seung Kim	SC St. Tönis 11/20	Undisclosed	
16 September 2022	FW	(Nigeria)	Goodnews Igbokwe	Van	Undisclosed	
8 February 2023	DF	(Armenia)	Arsen Galstyan	BKMA Yerevan	Undisclosed	
17 February 2023	FW	(France)	Alexandre Llovet	Sète 34	Undisclosed	
18 February 2023	DF	(Armenia)	Sergey Muradyan	Zenit St.Petersburg	Undisclosed	
18 February 2023	MF	(Armenia)	Erjanik Ghubasaryan	BKMA Yerevan	Undisclosed	
3 March 2023	GK	(Armenia)	Arman Simonyan	Unattached	Free	

=== Loans in ===
Date from	Position	Nationality	Name	From	Date to	Ref.
29 June 2022	MF	(Armenia)	Patvakan Avetisyan	Ararat-Armenia	End of season	
2 July 2022	MF	(Armenia)	Hayk Ghevondyan	Urartu	End of season	
2 July 2022	MF	(Armenia)	Ruben Yesayan	Urartu	End of season	
11 July 2022	GK	(Armenia)	Harutyun Melkonyan	Pyunik	End of season	
11 July 2022	MF	(Armenia)	Karen Muradyan	Pyunik	End of season	
19 July 2022	MF	(Armenia)	Ruben Hovsepyan	Ararat-Armenia	13 September 2022	
29 July 2022	MF	(Armenia)	Robert Baghramyan	Urartu	End of season	
21 February 2023	GK	(Romania)	Raul Bălbărău	Debreceni	End of season	
21 February 2023	FW	(Nigeria)	Peter Olawale	Debreceni	End of season	
26 February 2022	MF	(Nigeria)	Haggai Katoh	Plateau United	End of season	

=== Out ===
Date	Position	Nationality	Name	To	Fee	Ref.
28 July 2022	DF	(Guinea-Bissau)	Saná Gomes	Debreceni	Undisclosed	

=== Loans out ===
Date from	Position	Nationality	Name	To	Date to	Ref.
2 March 2023	DF	(Armenia)	Norayr Nikoghosyan	BKMA Yerevan	End of the season	

=== Released ===
Date	Position	Nationality	Name	Joined	Date	Ref.
10 June 2022	FW	(Russia)	Maksim Mayrovich	Urartu	28 June 2022	
12 June 2022	GK	(Armenia)	Artur Miroyan	West Armenia		
12 June 2022	MF	(Moldova)	Evgheni Oancea	Concordia Chiajna		
12 June 2022	FW	(Armenia)	Gegham Harutyunyan	Van		
12 June 2022	FW	(Ghana)	Raymond Gyasi	De Treffers	17 October 2022	
12 June 2022	GK	(Russia)	Grigori Matevosyan			
12 June 2022	DF	(Armenia)	Artur Kartashyan	Olympiakos Nicosia	17 June 2022	
12 June 2022	MF	(Latvia)	Aleksejs Grjaznovs	Liepāja		
12 June 2022	MF	(Moldova)	Dan Spătaru	Milsami Orhei		
12 June 2022	FW	(Russia)	Dmitri Lavrishchev	Kuban-Holding		
18 June 2022	MF	(Morocco)	Tarek Afqir	AEP Polemidion		
18 June 2022	FW	(Russia)	Andrei Titov			
20 June 2022	MF	(Portugal)	Alex Oliveira	CSM Slatina		
30 June 2022	DF	(Belarus)	Ilya Udodov	Tver		
5 July 2022	DF	(Armenia)	Jordy Monroy	Independiente Medellín		
6 July 2022	MF	(Moldova)	Alexei Ciopa	Zimbru Chișinău		
18 July 2022	DF	(Russia)	Albert Gabarayev	Rodina Moscow		
27 July 2022	MF	(Russia)	Yaroslav Matviyenko	West Armenia		
2 September 2022	MF	(Armenia)	Ashot Adamyan	Lernayin Artsakh		
14 December 2022	DF	(Armenia)	Arman Khachatryan	Alashkert	30 January 2023	
15 December 2022	GK	(Armenia)	Vardan Shahatuni			
15 December 2022	MF	(Armenia)	Armen Nahapetyan			
19 December 2022	MF	(Armenia)	Petros Afajanyan	Ararat Yerevan	18 February 2023	
27 December 2022	DF	(Russia)	Aleksandr Nesterov			
30 December 2022	MF	(Armenia)	Patvakan Avetisyan			
4 January 2023	MF	(Armenia)	Karen Nalbandyan	Alashkert	24 January 2023	
7 February 2023	MF	(Burkina Faso)	Dramane Salou	Urartu	11 February 2023	
9 February 2023	GK	(Armenia)	Anatoly Ayvazov	Alashkert	11 July 2023	

== Friendlies ==
5 February 2023	Ararat Yerevan	3–3	Noah	Dzoraghbyur
13:00 (UTC+4)	Kone 7', 45'; Glišić 65'	Report	Muradyan 21'; Igbokwe 41'; Trialist 75'	Stadium: Dzoraghbyur Training Centre

19 February 2023	Pyunik	3–1	Noah	Yerevan
14:00 (UTC+4)	Goal	Report	Goal	Stadium: Pyunik Training Ground

== Competitions ==
=== Overall record ===
Competition	First match	Last match	Starting round	Final position	Record							
Competition	First match	Last match	Starting round	Final position	Pld	W	D	L	GF	GA	GD	Win %
Premier League	2 August 2022	4 June 2022	Matchday 1	8th	36	8	8	20	34	66	−32	22.22
Armenian Cup	24 November 2022	26 November 2022	First Round	Quarterfinal	2	1	0	1	1	3	−2	50.00
Total					38	9	8	21	35	69	−34	23.68

Last updated: 4 June 2023
Source: Competitions

=== Premier League ===
==== Results summary ====
Overall								Home						Away					
Pld	W	D	L	GF	GA	GD	Pts	W	D	L	GF	GA	GD	W	D	L	GF	GA	GD
36	8	8	20	34	66	−32	32	5	4	9	22	33	−11	3	4	11	12	33	−21

Last updated: 4 June 2023.
Source: See Results

==== Results by round ====
Round	1	2	3	4	5	6	7	8	9	10	11	12	13	14	15	16	17	18	19	20	21	22	23	24	25	26	27	28	29	30	31	32	33	34	35	36
Ground	H	H	A	H	A	H	A	H	A	A	A	H	A	H	A	H	H	H	H	A	A	H	A	H	A	H	A	A	A	H	A	H	A	H	A	H
Result	L	L	D	L	L	D	L	L	D	L	D	D	L	L	L	L	D	W	W	L	W	L	L	W	L	D	D	L	W	L	L	L	L	W	W	W
Position	6	10	10	10	10	10	10	10	10	10	10	10	10	10	10	10	10	10	10	10	9	10	10	9	9	9	9	9	8	9	9	9	9	9	9	9

Updated to match(es) played on 31 May 2023. Source: See Results
A = Away; H = Home; W = Win; D = Draw; L = Loss; V = Void

==== Results ====
30 July 2022 1	Noah	3–4	Alashkert	Armavir
17:0 (UTC+4)	Adams 7'; Khachatryan (yellow card) 27'; Afajanyan 59'; Salou 83'; Ebenezer (yellow card) 88'	Report	Mensah 13'; Yedigaryan 17' (pen.); Díaz 38'; T.Voskanyan (yellow card) 42'; Gome (yellow card) 82'; Galvão 90+3'	Stadium: Armavir City Stadium; Referee: Vardan Mamnukyan

6 August 2022 2	Noah	0–1	Lernayin Artsakh	Armavir
17:30 (UTC+4)		Report	Chilingaryan (yellow card) 1'; Obonde (yellow card) 29'; Kostandyan (yellow card) 79'; Palacios (yellow card) 85'; Angulo 89'	Stadium: Armavir City Stadium; Referee: Ashot Ghaltakhchyan

12 August 2022 3	BKMA Yerevan	2–2	Noah	Yerevan
19:00 (UTC+4)	Shaghoyan 8' (pen.); Tarakhchyan (yellow card) 11'; Aghbalyan (yellow card) 45'; Petrosyan 90'; Avagyan (yellow card) 90+5'	Report	Yesayan 44'; Musakhanyan (yellow card) 62'; Danielyan (yellow card) 90+1'; Salou 90+6' (pen.)	Stadium: FFA Stadium; Referee: Artem Gasparyan

20 August 2022 4	Noah	0–6	Urartu	Armavir
17:00 (UTC+4)	Danielyan (yellow card) 75'	Report	Polyakov 32' (yellow card) 86'; Sabua 44'; Mayrovich 70'; Khlyobas 76', 78', 82'; Ayvazyan (yellow card) 88'	Stadium: Armavir City Stadium; Referee: Vardan Manukyan

29 August 2022 5	Pyunik	3–0	Noah	Yerevan
20:00 (UTC+4)	Mensalao 27'; Kovalenko 81'; Otubanjo 90'	Report	Afajanyan (yellow card) 43'; Khachatryan (yellow card) 60'	Stadium: Republican Stadium; Referee: Sargis Khachatryan

3 September 2022 6	Noah	0–0	Ararat Yerevan	Armavir
17:00 (UTC+4)	Nesterov (yellow card) 60'; Ebenezer (yellow card) 76'	Report		Stadium: Armavir City Stadium; Referee: Davit Mkrtchyan

9 September 2022 7	Ararat-Armenia	3–0	Noah	Yerevan
18:00 (UTC+4)	Agdon 18'; Udo (yellow card) 37'; Romércio 63'; Firmino 72'	Report		Stadium: FFA Stadium; Referee: Henrik Nalbandian

16 September 2022 8	Noah	1–3	Shirak	Armavir
16:00 (UTC+4)	Vardanyan 24'; Khachatryan (yellow card) 54'	Report	Mryan (yellow card) 24'; Gevorkyan 35'; Kodia 66'; Bakayoko 70'; Urushanyan (yellow card) 77'; Misakyan (yellow card) 89'	Stadium: Armavir City Stadium; Referee: Hovhannes Kalantaryan

2 October 2022 9	Van	2–2	Noah	Charentsavan
15:00 (UTC+4)	Gutiérrez (yellow card) 16'; Stepanyan (yellow card) 71'; Bilyi 77'; Movsesyan 88'	Report	Vardanyan 42'; Muradyan (yellow card) 77'; Hayrapetyan (yellow card) 79'; Ebenezer (yellow card) 84'; Opoku 90+3' (yellow card) 90+6'	Stadium: Charentsavan City Stadium; Referee: Vardan Manukyan

10 October 2022 10	Alashkert	5–0	Noah	Yerevan
15:00 (UTC+4)	Díaz 9', 58'; Ivanov 11', 45+3' (yellow card) 64'; Yedigaryan (yellow card) 46'; Reyes 65'	Report	Ayrapetyan (yellow card) 68'	Stadium: Alashkert Stadium; Referee: Zaven Hovhannisyan

15 October 2022 11	Lernayin Artsakh	0–0	Noah	Vayk
15:00 (UTC+4)	Kharatyan (yellow card) 20'; Sow (yellow card) 49'; Racines (yellow card) 53'; Asryan (yellow card) 67'; Adamyan (yellow card) 76'; Palacios (yellow card) 79'; Valdo (yellow card) 88'; Mkrtchyan (yellow card) 89'	Report	Muradyan (yellow card) 26'; Opoku (yellow card) 65'; Musakhanyan (yellow card) 89'	Stadium: Arevik Stadium; Referee: Henrik Nalbandian

19 October 2022 12	Noah	0–0	BKMA Yerevan	Armavir
15:00 (UTC+4)	Muradyan (yellow card) 60'; Avetisyan (yellow card) 90+4'	Report	Simonyan (yellow card) 56'	Stadium: Armavir City Stadium; Referee: Zaven Hovhannisyan

23 October 2022 13	Urartu	3–1	Noah	Yerevan
17:00 (UTC+4)	Mayrovich 11'; Mkrtchyan (yellow card) 26'; Marcos Júnior 74'; Ghazaryan (yellow card) 78'; Khlyobas 86'	Report	Adams 70'; Ebenezer (yellow card) 75'; Yesayan (yellow card) 89'; Nalbandyan (yellow card) 90+1'	Stadium: Urartu Stadium; Referee: Henrik Nalbandian

31 October 2022 14	Noah	0–1	Pyunik	Armavir
15:00 (UTC+4)	Yesayan (yellow card) 56'	Report	Caraballo 73'; Kovalenko (yellow card) 79'	Stadium: Armavir City Stadium; Referee: Ashot Ghaltakhchyan

5 November 2022 15	Ararat Yerevan	2–1	Noah	Yerevan
17:00 (UTC+4)	Mkrtchyan 20' (yellow card) 83'; Traoré (yellow card) 47'; E.Malakyan 62' (pen.); Galstyan (yellow card) 88'	Report	Salou (yellow card) 37'; Vardanyan 65'	Stadium: Republican Stadium; Referee: Hovhannes Kalantaryan

13 November 2022 16	Noah	1–2	Ararat-Armenia	Armavir
14:00 (UTC+4)	Salou 29'; Baghramyan (yellow card) 49'; Avetisyan (yellow card) 88'; Adams (yellow card) 90'	Report	Firmino 17'; Yenne 28'; Tera (yellow card) 62'	Stadium: Armavir City Stadium; Referee: Artem Gasparyan

20 November 2022 18	Noah	2–2	Van	Armavir
14:00 (UTC+4)	Vardanyan 8' (pen.); Baghramyan (yellow card) 54' (yellow-red card) 59'; Salou (yellow card) 60'; Igbokwe 69'; Ayvazov (yellow card) 90+5'	Report	Agamagomedov (yellow card) 7'; Asoyan (yellow card) 29'; Yahaya (yellow card) 36' (yellow-red card) 72'; Sani 55'; Movsesyan (yellow card) 90+2'; Mytsyk 90+5'	Stadium: Armavir City Stadium; Referee: Ashot Ghaltakhchyan

29 November 2022 19	Noah	3–2	Alashkert	Armavir
14:00 (UTC+4)	Ghevondyan 4'; Igbokwe 7' (yellow card) 71'; Kim (yellow card) 55'; Vardanyan 64' (pen.); K.Muradyan (yellow card) 76'; Opoku (yellow card) 85'	Report	Galvão 18'; Yedigaryan (yellow card) 46' (goal) 77' (pen.); Gome (yellow card) 48'; Ayvazyan (yellow card) 56'; Ivanov (yellow card) 78'; Čančarević (yellow card) 90+5'	Stadium: Armavir City Stadium; Referee: Vardan Manukyan

3 December 2022 20	Noah	2–0	Lernayin Artsakh	Armavir
14:00 (UTC+4)	Musakhanyan 4'; Danielyan (yellow card) 16'; Vardanyan 24'; Salou (yellow card) 84'	Report	Sow (yellow card) 35'; Jnohope (yellow card) 64'	Stadium: Armavir City Stadium; Referee: Yura Mahyesyan

8 December 2022 17	Shirak	2–0	Noah	Gyumri
16:00 (UTC+4)	Mikaelyan (yellow card) 17'; Misakyan (yellow card) 22'; Sadoyan (yellow card) 32'; Bakayoko 39'; Mryan 90+1'	Report	Adams (yellow card) 66'	Stadium: Gyumri City Stadium; Referee: Artem Gasparyan

27 February 2023 21	BKMA Yerevan	0–1	Noah	Yerevan
15:00 (UTC+4)	Simonyan (yellow card) 53'; Khamoyan (yellow card) 90+2'	Report	Llovet 64'	Stadium: FFA Stadium; Referee: Ashot Ghaltakhchyan

6 March 2023 22	Noah	0–2	Urartu	Armavir
15:00 (UTC+4)	S. Muradyan (red card) 27'; Danielyan (yellow card) 84'; Adams (yellow card) 90+1'; Ebenezer (yellow card) 90+3'	Report	Piloyan (yellow card) 12'; Zotko (yellow card) 23'; Margaryan 89'; Grigoryan 90+4' (pen.)	Stadium: Armavir City Stadium; Referee: Henrik Nalbandian

11 March 2023 23	Pyunik	2–0	Noah	Yerevan
15:00 (UTC+4)	Miljković (yellow card) 23'; Harutyunyan (yellow card) 39'; Malakyan 43'; Juričić 72'	Report	Igbokwe (yellow card) 42'	Stadium: Republican Stadium; Referee: Artem Gasparyan

18 March 2023 24	Noah	2–1	Ararat Yerevan	Armavir
15:00 (UTC+4)	Llovet 72'; Yesayan 90+5'	Report	Mijić 77'; Afajanyan (yellow card) 89'; Mahmoud (yellow card) 90+3'	Stadium: Armavir City Stadium; Referee: Yura Mahtesyan

2 April 2023 25	Ararat-Armenia	3–0	Noah	Yerevan
16:00 (UTC+4)	Eza 13', 41'; Serobyan 59'; Nondi (yellow card) 61'	Report		Stadium: FFA Stadium; Referee: Artem Gasparyan

11 April 2023 26	Noah	3–3	Shirak	Armavir
16:00 (UTC+4)	Llovet 29'; Yesayan 32' (yellow card) 45'; Bălbărău (yellow card) 45+3'; Vardanyan (yellow card) 69'; Kim 90+4'; Simonyan (yellow card) 90+6'	Report	Traore (yellow card) 22'; Mikaelyan (yellow card) 36'; Cisse (yellow card) 44'; Bakayoko 45+3' (pen.) (yellow card) 90'; Misakyan 64'; Ghubasaryan 78' (o.g.)	Stadium: Armavir City Stadium; Referee: Yura Mahtesyan

17 April 2023 27	Van	1–1	Noah	Charentsavan
16:00 (UTC+4)	Najaryan (yellow card) 55'; Manoyan 62'; Manucharyan (yellow card) 69'; Hovhannisyan (yellow card) 90+5'	Report	Muradyan (yellow card) 22'; Vardanyan (yellow card) 61'; Muradyan (yellow card) 69'; Llovet 80'	Stadium: Charentsavan City Stadium; Referee: Vardan Manukyan

21 April 2023 28	Alashkert	3–0	Noah	Yerevan
16:00 (UTC+4)	Galvão 38'; Miranyan 71'; Ustinov 90+1'	Report	Olawale (yellow card) 34'; Yesayan (yellow card) 80'	Stadium: Alashkert Stadium; Referee: Zaven Hovhannisyan

25 April 2023 29	Lernayin Artsakh	0–2	Noah	Vayk
16:00 (UTC+4)	Obonde (yellow card) 30'; Arakelyan (yellow card) 62'; Adamyan (yellow card) 70'; Dosa (yellow card) 81'; Kharatyan (yellow card) 90+4'	Report	Kim 13'; Vardanyan (yellow card) 37'; Llovet 66'; Ebenezer (yellow card) 90+5'	Stadium: Arevik Stadium; Referee: Ashot Ghaltakhchyan

1 May 2023 30	Noah	1–2	BKMA Yerevan	Armavir
19:00 (UTC+4)	Llovet 25'; Baghramyan (yellow card) 67'; S.Hakobyan (yellow card) 87'; Musakhanyan (yellow card) 90+1'	Report	Mkrtchyan 15'; G.Petrosyan 71'; Tarakhchyan (yellow card) 72'; Nersesyan (yellow card) 90+4'	Stadium: Armavir City Stadium; Referee: Henrik Nalbandian

8 May 2023 31	Urartu	1–0	Noah	Yerevan
19:00 (UTC+4)	Özbiliz 49'; Sabua (yellow card) 63'; Marcos Júnior (yellow card) 89'	Report	Musakhanyan (red card) 77'; Llovet (yellow card) 90+1'; Melkonyan (yellow card) 90+6'	Stadium: Urartu Stadium; Referee: Vardan Manukyan

15 May 2023 32	Noah	1–3	Pyunik	Yerevan
19:00 (UTC+4)	Ayrapetyan (yellow card) 27'; Melkonyan (yellow card) 41'; Igbokwe 60' (yellow card) 83'; Olawale (yellow card) 81'; Danielyan (yellow card) 87'	Report	Désiré 22'; Malakyan (yellow card) 27' (goal) 43' (pen.); Caraballo (yellow card) 46'; Dashyan (yellow card) 48'; Gareginyan (yellow card) 58'; Otubanjo 72'; Juričić (yellow card) 85'; Davidyan (yellow card) 88'	Stadium: FFA Stadium; Referee: Artem Gasparyan

15 May 2023 32	Noah	1–3	Pyunik	Abovyan
19:00 (UTC+4)	Ayrapetyan (yellow card) 27'; Melkonyan (yellow card) 41'; Igbokwe 60' (yellow card) 83'; Olawale (yellow card) 81'; Danielyan (yellow card) 87'	Report	Désiré 22'; Malakyan (yellow card) 27' (goal) 43' (pen.); Caraballo (yellow card) 46'; Dashyan (yellow card) 48'; Gareginyan (yellow card) 58'; Otubanjo 72'; Juričić (yellow card) 85'; Davidyan (yellow card) 88'	Stadium: Abovyan City Stadium; Referee: Henrik Nalbandian

20 May 2023 33	Ararat Yerevan	1–0	Noah	Yerevan
19:00 (UTC+4)	Ransom (yellow card) 7'; Malakyan (yellow card) 42'; Hadji 47'; Revyakin (yellow card) 90+3'	Report	K.Muradyan (yellow card) 19'; Llovet (yellow card) 27'	Stadium: Republican Stadium; Referee: Zaven Hovhannisyan

27 May 2023 34	Noah	2–1	Ararat-Armenia	Abovyan
20:00 (UTC+4)	Vardanyan 23'; Danielyan (yellow card) 24'; Muradyan (yellow card) 33'; Igbokwe 67'; Bălbărău (yellow card) 90+3'; Ebenezer (yellow card) 90+7'; Melkonyan (yellow card) 90+7'	Report	Nondi (yellow card) 17'; Serobyan 30' (pen.); Grigoryan (yellow card) 70'	Stadium: Abovyan City Stadium; Referee: Ashot Ghaltakhchyan

31 May 2023 35	Shirak	0–2	Noah	Gyumri
20:00 (UTC+4)	Bakayoko (yellow card) 66'	Report	Kim (yellow card) 46'; Igbokwe 77', 82'; Bălbărău (yellow card) 87'	Stadium: Gyumri City Stadium; Referee: Vardan Manukyan

4 June 2023 36	Noah	1–0	Van	Abovyan
19:00 (UTC+4)	Vardanyan 29'; Igbokwe (yellow card) 31'; Bălbărău (yellow card) 61'; Baghramyan (yellow card) 82'; Danielyan (yellow card) 90+4'; S. Muradyan (red card) 90+5'	Report	Asoyan (yellow card) 31'; Gorelov (yellow card) 62'; Najaryan (yellow card) 82'; Barrios (red card) 90+5'; Zamora (yellow card) 90+6'	Stadium: Abovyan City Stadium; Referee: Ashot Ghaltakhchyan

==== Table ====
Pos	Team	Pld	W	D	L	GF	GA	GD	Pts	Qualification or relegation
1	Urartu (C)	36	26	5	5	68	25	+43	83	Qualification for the Champions League first qualifying round
2	Pyunik	36	25	5	6	72	23	+49	80	Qualification for the Europa Conference League first qualifying round (Note: The 2022–23 Armenian Cup winners qualified for the Europa Conference League first qualifying round. Since the cup winners (Urartu) qualified based on league position, the Europa Conference League spot was passed to the fourth-placed team.)
3	Ararat-Armenia	36	23	7	6	70	27	+43	76	Qualification for the Europa Conference League first qualifying round
4	Alashkert	36	20	6	10	58	37	+21	66	Qualification for the Europa Conference League first qualifying round
5	Van	36	11	7	18	38	59	−21	40	
6	Ararat Yerevan	36	10	8	18	29	42	−13	38	
7	Shirak	36	10	6	20	25	55	−30	36	
8	Noah	36	8	8	20	34	66	−32	32 (Note: Games won: Noah 8, BKMA 7.)	
9	BKMA	36	7	11	18	36	53	−17	32	
10	Lernayin Artsakh (R)	36	5	7	24	16	59	−43	22	Relegation to the Armenian First League

Source: FFA Soccerway
Rules for classification: 1) Points; 2) Head-to-head points; 3) Head-to-head goal difference; 4) Head-to-head goals scored; 5) Matches won; 6) Goal difference; 7) Less red cards; 8) Less yellow cards; 9) Fair-play ranking 10) Draw
(C) Champions; (R) Relegated

=== Armenian Cup ===
6 October 2022 First round	BKMA Yerevan	0–1	Noah	Yerevan
16:00 (UTC+4)	Grigoryan (red card) 13'; Khachumyan (yellow card) 46'; Samson (yellow card) 75'; Petrosyan (yellow card) 90+1'	Report	Salou 10' (pen.); Vardanyan (yellow card) 10'; Ebenezer (yellow card) 46'; Nikoghosyan (yellow card) 58'	Stadium: Yerevan Football Academy Stadium; Referee: Yura Mahtesyan

26 November 2022 Quarterfinal	Pyunik	3–0	Noah	Yerevan
19:00 (UTC+4)	Otubanjo 17'; Gareginyan (yellow card) 70'; Ristevski (yellow card) 88'; Juričić 89', 90+4'; Buchnev (yellow card) 90+1'	Report	Adams (yellow card) 30'; Salou (yellow card) 71'; Igbokwe (yellow card) 76'; Danielyan (yellow card) 79'	Stadium: Republican Stadium; Referee: Sargis Khachatryan

== Statistics ==
As of match played 4 June 2023

=== Appearances and goals ===
No.	Pos	Nat	Player	Total		Premier League		Armenian Cup	
No.	Pos	Nat	Player	Apps	Goals	Apps	Goals	Apps	Goals
1	GK	(Romania) ROU	Raul Bălbărău	10	0	10	0	0	0
2	DF	(Armenia) ARM	Arsen Galstyan	7	0	4+3	0	0	0
3	DF	(Armenia) ARM	Karen Muradyan	23	0	20+2	0	1	0
6	MF	(Belarus) BLR	Hayk Musakhanyan	27	1	19+6	1	2	0
9	FW	(Armenia) ARM	Levon Vardanyan	34	8	30+3	8	1	0
10	FW	(Nigeria) NGR	Peter Olawale	11	0	7+4	0	0	0
11	MF	(Ghana) GHA	Israel Opoku	9	1	2+5	1	0+2	0
13	MF	(Armenia) ARM	Robert Baghramyan	29	0	26+1	0	2	0
17	MF	(Nigeria) NGR	Friday Adams	35	2	30+3	2	2	0
18	DF	(Nigeria) NGR	Okazie Ebenezer	31	0	27+2	0	2	0
20	MF	(Armenia) ARM	Erjanik Ghubasaryan	6	0	3+3	0	0	0
21	MF	(Nigeria) NGR	Haggai Katoh	13	0	3+10	0	0	0
22	MF	(Armenia) ARM	Ruben Yesayan	35	3	14+19	3	1+1	0
23	MF	(Armenia) ARM	Hayk Ghevondyan	23	1	14+8	1	1	0
25	DF	(Armenia) ARM	Artur Danielyan	21	0	18+2	0	1	0
26	MF	(Russia) RUS	Arsen Ayrapetyan	28	0	13+13	0	0+2	0
27	FW	(Armenia) ARM	Samvel Hakobyan	12	0	1+10	0	1	0
28	FW	(South Korea) KOR	Yeon-seung Kim	31	2	21+8	2	2	0
33	MF	(Armenia) ARM	Vahagn Hayrapetyan	19	0	15+3	0	0+1	0
65	DF	(Armenia) ARM	Gor Abrahamyan	4	0	1+3	0	0	0
66	DF	(Armenia) ARM	Sergey Muradyan	14	0	13+1	0	0	0
70	FW	(France) FRA	Alexandre Llovet	16	6	15+1	6	0	0
77	GK	(Armenia) ARM	Arman Simonyan	1	0	0+1	0	0	0
91	FW	(Nigeria) NGR	Goodnews Igbokwe	24	6	10+13	6	1	0
99	GK	(Armenia) ARM	Harutyun Melkonyan	6	0	6	0	0	0
Players away on loan:
5	DF	(Armenia) ARM	Norayr Nikoghosyan	13	0	8+4	0	0+1	0
Players who left Noah during the season:
7	MF	(Armenia) ARM	Karen Nalbandyan	13	0	6+7	0	0	0
8	MF	(Burkina Faso) BFA	Dramane Salou	22	4	19+1	3	2	1
10	MF	(Armenia) ARM	Armen Nahapetyan	8	0	2+6	0	0	0
20	MF	(Armenia) ARM	Petros Afajanyan	10	1	4+6	1	0	0
21	MF	(Armenia) ARM	Patvakan Avetisyan	14	0	2+11	0	0+1	0
77	GK	(Armenia) ARM	Vardan Shahatuni	14	0	12	0	2	0
94	DF	(Armenia) ARM	Arman Khachatryan	14	0	9+3	0	1+1	0
96	GK	(Armenia) ARM	Anatoly Ayvazov	8	0	8	0	0	0
97	DF	(Russia) RUS	Aleksandr Nesterov	9	0	9	0	0	0

=== Goal scorers ===
Place	Position	Nation	Number	Name	Premier League	Armenian Cup	Total
1	FW	(Armenia)	9	Levon Vardanyan	8	0	8
2	FW	(France)	70	Alexandre Llovet	6	0	6
2	FW	(Nigeria)	91	Goodnews Igbokwe	6	0	6
4	MF	(Burkina Faso)	8	Dramane Salou	3	1	4
5	MF	(Armenia)	22	Ruben Yesayan	3	0	3
6	MF	(Nigeria)	17	Friday Adams	2	0	2
6	FW	(South Korea)	28	Yeon-seung Kim	2	0	2
8	MF	(Armenia)	20	Petros Afajanyan	1	0	1
8	MF	(Ghana)	11	Israel Opoku	1	0	1
8	MF	(Armenia)	23	Hayk Ghevondyan	1	0	1
8	MF	(Belarus)	6	Hayk Musakhanyan	1	0	1
				TOTALS	34	1	35

=== Clean sheets ===
Place	Position	Nation	Number	Name	Premier League	Armenian Cup	Total
1	GK	(Armenia)	77	Vardan Shahatuni	3	1	4
2	GK	(Romania)	1	Raul Bălbărău	2	0	2
3	GK	(Armenia)	96	Anatoly Ayvazov	1	0	1
3	GK	(Armenia)	99	Harutyun Melkonyan	1	0	1
				TOTALS	7	1	8

=== Disciplinary record ===
Number	Nation	Position	Name	Premier League		Armenian Cup		Total	
Number	Nation	Position	Name	Booked	Sent off (straight red)	Booked	Sent off (straight red)	Booked	Sent off (straight red)
1	(Romania)	GK	Raul Bălbărău	4	0	0	0	4	0
3	(Armenia)	DF	Karen Muradyan	6	0	0	0	6	0
6	(Belarus)	MF	Hayk Musakhanyan	3	1	0	0	3	1
9	(Armenia)	FW	Levon Vardanyan	3	0	1	0	4	0
10	(Nigeria)	FW	Peter Olawale	2	0	0	0	2	0
11	(Ghana)	MF	Israel Opoku	3	0	0	0	3	0
13	(Armenia)	MF	Robert Baghramyan	5	1	0	0	5	1
17	(Nigeria)	MF	Friday Adams	3	0	1	0	4	0
18	(Nigeria)	DF	Okazie Ebenezer	7	0	1	0	8	0
22	(Armenia)	MF	Ruben Yesayan	4	0	0	0	4	0
25	(Armenia)	DF	Artur Danielyan	7	0	1	0	8	0
26	(Russia)	MF	Arsen Ayrapetyan	2	0	0	0	2	0
27	(Armenia)	FW	Samvel Hakobyan	1	0	0	0	1	0
28	(South Korea)	FW	Yeon-seung Kim	2	0	0	0	2	0
33	(Armenia)	MF	Vahagn Hayrapetyan	1	0	0	0	1	0
66	(Armenia)	DF	Sergey Muradyan	5	1	0	0	5	1
70	(France)	FW	Alexandre Llovet	2	0	0	0	2	0
77	(Armenia)	GK	Arman Simonyan	1	0	0	0	1	0
91	(Nigeria)	FW	Goodnews Igbokwe	4	0	1	0	5	0
99	(Armenia)	GK	Harutyun Melkonyan	3	0	0	0	3	0
Players away on loan:
5	(Armenia)	DF	Norayr Nikoghosyan	0	0	1	0	1	0
Players who left Noah during the season:
7	(Armenia)	MF	Karen Nalbandyan	1	0	0	0	1	0
8	(Burkina Faso)	MF	Dramane Salou	3	0	1	0	4	0
20	(Armenia)	MF	Petros Afajanyan	1	0	0	0	1	0
21	(Armenia)	MF	Patvakan Avetisyan	2	0	0	0	2	0
94	(Armenia)	DF	Arman Khachatryan	3	0	0	0	3	0
96	(Armenia)	GK	Anatoly Ayvazov	1	0	0	0	1	0
97	(Russia)	DF	Aleksandr Nesterov	1	0	0	0	1	0
			TOTALS	77	4	7	0	84	4
