= 2024–25 FC Noah season =

Noah
2024–25 season
- CEO: Artur Sahakyan
- Manager: Rui Mota
- Stadium: Armavir City Stadium
- Premier League: Champions
- Armenian Cup: Champions
- UEFA Conference League: League phase
- Top goalscorer: League: Gonçalo Gregório (20); All: Gonçalo Gregório (27)
Home colours	Away colours	Third colours

The 2024–25 season was FC Noah's 7th season in Armenian Premier League.

== Season events ==
In June, Noah announced the appointment of Rui Mota as their new head coach.

On 1 June, Noah announced the signing of Artak Dashyan from Pyunik.

On 15 June, Noah announced the signing of Gonçalo Silva from Farense.

On 18 June, Noah announced the signing of free-agent Artyom Avanesyan, who'd last played for Ararat-Armenia.

On 22 June, Noah announced the signing of Aleksey Ploshchadny from Van.

On 24 June, Noah announced the signing of Hélder Ferreira from Anorthosis Famagusta, and Eraldo Çinari from Shkëndija.

On 27 June, Noah announced the signing of Grenik Petrosyan from Pyunik.

On 30 June, Noah announced the signing of Matheus Aiás from Moreirense.

On 1 July, Noah announced the signing of Gustavo Sangaré from Quevilly-Rouen, with Gonçalo Gregório joining from Dinamo București the following day.

On 8 July, Noah announced the signing of Guðmundur Þórarinsson from OFI and Marcos Pedro from Fluminense.

On 14 July, Noah announced the signing of Imran Oulad Omar from Hapoel Be'er Sheva.

On 17 July, Noah announced the signing of Bryan Mendoza from Botev Vratsa.

On 20 July, Noah announced the signing of Arthur Coneglian from Grêmio.

On 9 August, Noah announced the signing of Yan Eteki from Alcorcón.

On 16 January, Noah announced the signing of James Santos from Pyunik.

On 18 January, Noah announced that Pablo Santos had left the club at the end of his contract.

On 28 January, Noah announced the signing of Bruno Almeida on loan from Santa Clara.

On 5 February, Noah announced the signing of Nermin Zolotić from Casa Pia.

On 6 February, Noah announced that they had extended their contract with Virgile Pinson until the summer of 2026, with an option for another year.

== Squad ==
As of match played 27 May 2025

Number	Name	Nationality	Position	Date of birth (age)	Signed from	Signed in	Contract ends	Apps.	Goals
Goalkeepers
12	Artyom Davidov	(Armenia)	GK	2 September 2007 (aged 17)	Academy	2024		0	0
22	Ognjen Čančarević	(Armenia)	GK	25 September 1989 (aged 35)	Alashkert	2024		44	1
29	Arthur Coneglian	(Brazil)	GK	30 May 2004 (aged 20)	Grêmio	2024		3	0
60	Varazdat Gasparyan	(Armenia)	GK	7 March 2007 (aged 18)	Pyunik	2024		0	0
69	Roman Khachatryan	(Armenia)	GK	16 November 2008 (aged 16)	Pyunik	2024		0	0
92	Aleksey Ploshchadny	(Russia)	GK	21 April 2004 (aged 21)	Van	2024		18	0
Defenders
3	Sergey Muradyan	(Armenia)	DF	27 August 2004 (aged 20)	Zenit St.Petersburg	2023		81	3
4	Guðmundur Þórarinsson	(Iceland)	DF	15 April 1992 (aged 33)	OFI	2024		26	2
5	James Santos	(Brazil)	DF	15 July 1995 (aged 29)	Pyunik	2025		8	0
6	Marcos Pedro	(Brazil)	DF	1 December 2001 (aged 23)	Fluminense	2024		12	1
14	Bryan Mendoza	(Argentina)	DF	14 March 1993 (aged 32)	Botev Vratsa	2024		23	1
19	Hovhannes Hambardzumyan	(Armenia)	DF	4 October 1990 (aged 34)	Anorthosis Famagusta	2023		65	6
26	Aleksandar Miljković	(Serbia)	DF	26 February 1990 (aged 35)	Pyunik	2023		62	4
37	Gonçalo Silva	(Portugal)	DF	4 June 1991 (aged 33)	Farense	2024		43	3
40	Hovhannes Gevorgyan	(Armenia)	DF	5 October 2006 (aged 18)	Mika	2024		0	0
43	David Dokhoyan	(Armenia)	DF	2 December 2008 (aged 16)	Pyunik	2024		0	0
44	Nermin Zolotić	(Bosnia and Herzegovina)	DF	7 July 1993 (aged 31)	Casa Pia	2025		17	1
61	Gor Grigoryan	(Armenia)	DF		Academy	2024		1	0
62	Artur Talasyan	(Armenia)	DF	1 April 2005 (aged 20)	Urartu	2024		0	0
Midfielders
10	Artak Dashyan	(Armenia)	MF	20 November 1989 (aged 35)	Pyunik	2024		21	1
13	Robert Baghramyan	(Armenia)	MF	29 June 2002 (aged 22)	Urartu	202		34	1
17	Gustavo Sangaré	(Burkina Faso)	MF	8 November 1996 (aged 28)	Quevilly-Rouen	2024		34	0
20	Martin Gamboš	(Slovakia)	MF	23 January 1998 (aged 27)	Västerås SK	2023		52	1
21	Bruno Almeida	(Portugal)	MF	9 September 1996 (aged 28)	on loan from Santa Clara	2025	2025	16	4
27	Gor Manvelyan	(Armenia)	MF	9 April 2002 (aged 23)	Nantes	2023		63	8
50	Gagik Meloyan	(Armenia)	MF	23 March 2007 (aged 18)	Academy	2024		2	0
55	Artur Movsesyan	(Armenia)	MF	2 January 2008 (aged 17)	Academy	2024		7	0
63	Aram Beganyan	(Armenia)	MF	5 April 2005 (aged 20)	Urartu	2024		0	0
65	Gor Abrahamyan	(Armenia)	MF	7 December 2005 (aged 19)	Academy	2023		7	0
68	Gevorg Grigoryan	(Armenia)	MF	5 April 2004 (aged 21)	Urartu	2024		1	0
81	Imran Oulad Omar	(Netherlands)	MF	11 December 1997 (aged 27)	Hapoel Be'er Sheva	2024		36	9
88	Yan Eteki	(Cameroon)	MF	26 August 1997 (aged 27)	Alcorcón	2024		32	0
Forwards
7	Hélder Ferreira	(Portugal)	FW	5 April 1997 (aged 28)	Anorthosis Famagusta	2024		42	13
8	Gonçalo Gregório	(Portugal)	FW	14 June 1995 (aged 29)	Dinamo București	2024		43	27
9	Matheus Aiás	(Brazil)	FW	30 December 1996 (aged 28)	Moreirense	2024		41	19
11	Eraldo Çinari	(Albania)	FW	11 October 1996 (aged 28)	Shkëndija	2024		43	16
18	Artyom Avanesyan	(Armenia)	FW	17 July 1999 (aged 25)	Unattached	2024		24	1
24	Zaven Khudaverdyan	(Armenia)	FW	15 June 2007 (aged 17)	Pyunik	2024		20	2
30	Grenik Petrosyan	(Armenia)	FW	5 December 2001 (aged 23)	Pyunik	2024		29	2
64	Michael Asiryan	(Armenia)	FW	26 February 2008 (aged 17)	Pyunik	2024		0	0
67	Andranik Karapetyan	(Armenia)	FW	6 November 2006 (aged 18)	Mika	2024		1	0
71	Bilal Fofana	(France)	FW	7 July 2006 (aged 18)	Farense	2024		2	0
93	Virgile Pinson	(France)	FW	22 February 1996 (aged 29)	Unattached	2024	2026 (+1)	53	9
Players away on loan
Players who left during the season
28	Pablo Santos	(Brazil)	DF	18 March 1992 (aged 33)	Unattached	2024		21	4

== Transfers ==
=== In ===
Date	Position	Nationality	Name	From	Fee	Ref.
1 June 2024	MF	(Armenia)	Artak Dashyan	Pyunik	Undisclosed	
15 June 2024	DF	(Portugal)	Gonçalo Silva	Farense	Undisclosed	
18 June 2024	FW	(Armenia)	Artyom Avanesyan	Unattached	Free	
22 June 2024	GK	(Russia)	Aleksey Ploshchadny	Van	Undisclosed	
24 June 2024	FW	(Portugal)	Hélder Ferreira	Anorthosis Famagusta	Undisclosed	
24 June 2024	FW	(Albania)	Eraldo Çinari	Shkëndija	Undisclosed	
27 June 2024	FW	(Armenia)	Grenik Petrosyan	Pyunik	Undisclosed	
30 June 2024	FW	(Brazil)	Matheus Aiás	Moreirense	Undisclosed	
1 July 2024	MF	(Burkina Faso)	Gustavo Sangaré	Quevilly-Rouen	Undisclosed	
2 July 2024	FW	(Portugal)	Gonçalo Gregório	Dinamo București	Undisclosed	
8 July 2024	DF	(Iceland)	Guðmundur Þórarinsson	OFI	Undisclosed	
8 July 2024	DF	(Brazil)	Marcos Pedro	Fluminense	Undisclosed	
14 July 2024	MF	(Netherlands)	Imran Oulad Omar	Hapoel Be'er Sheva	Undisclosed	
17 July 2024	DF	(Argentina)	Bryan Mendoza	Botev Vratsa	Undisclosed	
20 July 2024	GK	(Brazil)	Arthur Coneglian	Grêmio	Undisclosed	
9 August 2024	MF	(Cameroon)	Yan Eteki	Alcorcón	Undisclosed	
16 January 2025	DF	(Brazil)	James Santos	Pyunik	Undisclosed	
5 February 2025	DF	(Bosnia and Herzegovina)	Nermin Zolotić	Casa Pia	Undisclosed	

=== Loans in ===
Date from	Position	Nationality	Name	To	Date to	Ref.
28 January 2025	MF	(Portugal)	Bruno Almeida	Santa Clara	End of season	

=== Out ===
Date	Position	Nationality	Name	To	Fee	Ref.
29 July 2024	FW	(New Zealand)	Logan Rogerson	Auckland	Undisclosed	

=== Released ===
Date	Position	Nationality	Name	Joined	Date	Ref.
1 June 2024	GK	(Italy)	Valerio Vimercati	Alashkert	1 August 2024	
1 June 2024	DF	(Armenia)	Artur Danielyan	West Armenia	8 August 2024	
1 June 2024	DF	(Armenia)	Vaspurak Minasyan	Alashkert	1 August 2024	
1 June 2024	DF	(Armenia)	Norayr Nikoghosyan	Van	4 July 2024	
1 June 2024	DF	(Armenia)	Alen Poghosyan	Alashkert	1 August 2024	
1 June 2024	DF	(Mozambique)	David Malembana	Al Kharaitiyat		
1 June 2024	DF	(Netherlands)	Jordy Tutuarima	Persis Solo		
1 June 2024	DF	(Portugal)	Pedro Farrim	Vitória	9 July 2025	
1 June 2024	MF	(Armenia)	Karen Galstyan	Kilikia		
1 June 2024	MF	(Armenia)	Erjanik Ghubasaryan	SC Wentorf		
1 June 2024	MF	(Nigeria)	Haggai Katoh	Alashkert	1 August 2024	
1 June 2024	MF	(Netherlands)	Ilias Alhaft	Cambuur	3 September 2024	
1 June 2024	MF	(Netherlands)	Justin Mathieu	Al-Riffa		
1 June 2024	MF	(Senegal)	Alfred N'Diaye			
1 June 2024	MF	(Uruguay)	Nico Varela	Alcantarilla FC		
1 June 2024	FW	(Armenia)	Artur Miranyan	Universitatea Cluj	20 September 2024	
1 June 2024	FW	(Armenia)	Edgar Movsesyan	Urartu		
1 June 2024	FW	(Brazil)	Allef	Van	29 August 2025	
1 June 2024	FW	(Netherlands)	Paul Gladon	Fortuna Sittard	6 June 2025	
18 January 2025	DF	(Brazil)	Pablo Santos	Punjab	21 October 2025	
30 May 2025	DF	(Serbia)	Aleksandar Miljković	Pyunik	17 June 2025	

== Friendlies ==
29 June 2024	Vojvodina	3–2	Noah
20:00 (UTC+4)	Nikolić 49'; Zukić 71'; Zady 85'	Report	Rogerson 11', 18'

27 January 2025	Zenit St.Petersburg	1–2	Noah	Al Rayyan, Qatar
18:30 (UTC+4)	Yerokhin 75'	Report	Gregório 30' (pen.); Khudaverdyan (yellow card) 43'; Aiás 70'	Stadium: Aspire Dome

2 February 2025	Al Mashaf	0–8	Noah	Qatar
18:30 (UTC+4)		Report	Petrosyan; Khudaverdyan; Gregório; Aiás; Ferreira; Mendoza; Almeida

6 February 2025	Al-Gharafa	0–3	Noah	Qatar
(UTC+4)		Report	Gregório; Hambardzumyan

9 February 2025	Ahli Sanaa	0–0	Noah	Qatar
(UTC+4)		Report

20 March 2025	Noah	1–0	Torpedo Kutaisi	Armavir
16:00 (UTC+4)	Petrosyan 78'	Report		Stadium: Armavir City Stadium

== Competitions ==
=== Overview ===
Competition	First match	Last match	Starting round	Final position	Record							
Competition	First match	Last match	Starting round	Final position	Pld	W	D	L	GF	GA	GD	Win %
Premier League	4 August 2024	27 May 2025	Matchday 1	Winners	30	24	3	3	92	20	+72	80.00
Armenian Cup	19 February 2025	13 May 2025	Second round	Winners	6	5	0	1	14	2	+12	83.33
UEFA Conference League	25 July 2024	20 December 2024	Fist qualifying round	League phase	14	6	2	6	24	22	+2	42.86
Total					50	35	5	10	130	44	+86	70.00

Last updated: 27 May 2025
Source: Competitions

=== Premier League ===
==== Results summary ====
Overall								Home						Away					
Pld	W	D	L	GF	GA	GD	Pts	W	D	L	GF	GA	GD	W	D	L	GF	GA	GD
30	24	3	3	92	20	+72	75	15	0	0	53	5	+48	9	3	3	39	15	+24

Last updated: 27 May 2025.
Source: See Results

==== Results by round ====
Round	2	4	5	6	7	8	9	11	12	13	14	16	17	15	18	10	1	3	20	21	22	23	24	25	19	26	27	28	29	30	31	32	33
Ground	A	A	-	A	A	H	A	A	H	A	H	H	H	A	-	H	H	H	A	H	A	-	A	H	H	A	H	H	A	H	A	H	A
Result	W	W	P	L	D	W	L	W	W	W	W	W	W	W	P	W	W	W	W	W	W	P	W	W	W	W	W	W	D	W	D	W	L
Position	2	4	4	6	4	5	6	5	5	4	4	4	4	3	3	3	2	1	1	1	1	1	1	1	1	1	1	1	1	1	1	1	1

Updated to match(es) played on 27 May 2025. Source: See Results
A = Away; H = Home; W = Win; D = Draw; L = Loss; P = Bye

==== Results ====
11 August 2024 2	Shirak	0–5	Noah	Gyumri
19:00 (UTC+4)	Mkrtchyan (yellow card) 34'	Report	Gregório 2'; Çinari 19', 53'; Manvelyan (yellow card) 38'; Ferreira 83'; Aiás 90'	Stadium: City Stadium; Referee: Hovhannes Kalantaryan

25 August 2024 4	BKMA Yerevan	1–2	Noah	Yerevan
20:00 (UTC+4)	Bashoyan (yellow card) 33'; Eloyan 56' (pen.); Arakelyan (yellow card) 82'	Report	Aiás 8' (pen.); Petrosyan 53'; Ploshchadny (yellow card) 55'; Mendoza (yellow card) 78'; Dashyan (yellow card) 90+2'	Stadium: FFA Stadium; Referee: Henrik Nalbandian

5	Bye
(UTC+4)

15 September 2024 6	Ararat Yerevan	2–1	Noah	Yerevan
19:00 (UTC+4)	Goore 79'; Kante 90+1'; Hadji (yellow card) 90+7'	Report	Pinson (yellow card) 29'; Ferreira 47'; Miljković (yellow card) 69'; Eteki (yellow card) 71' (yellow-red card) 74'	Stadium: Republican Stadium; Referee: Artem Gasparyan

19 September 2024 7	Van	1–1	Noah	Charentsavan
16:00 (UTC+4)	Gareginyan (yellow card) 44'; Farayola 59'; Matyukhin (red card) 63'; Polyanski (yellow card) 89'; Akila (yellow card) 90+6'	Report	Oulad Omar 28'	Stadium: City Stadium; Referee: Zaven Hovhannisyan

24 September 2024 8	Noah	2–0	Pyunik	Abovyan
19:00 (UTC+4)	Gamboš (yellow card) 27'; Manvelyan (yellow card) 45+8'; Gregório 46'; Pinson 60'; Čančarević (yellow card) 83'	Report	Otubanjo (yellow card) 45'; Bratkov (yellow card) 57'; Udo (yellow card) 63'	Stadium: City Stadium; Referee: Henrik Nalbandian

29 September 2024 9	Urartu	2–1	Noah	Yerevan
19:00 (UTC+4)	Piloyan (yellow card) 38'; Simonyan 45+5'; Gilmore 66'; Melikhov (yellow card) 89'	Report	Pinson (yellow card) 38'; Aiás 59'; Ferreira (yellow card) 72'	Stadium: Urartu Stadium; Referee: Ashot Ghaltakhchyan

16 October 2024 11	Alashkert	0–6	Noah	Abovyan
18:00 (UTC+4)	Poghosyan (yellow card) 39'; Khachatryan (yellow card) 53'; Vimercati (yellow card) 89'	Report	Gregório 19' (pen.), 55'; Avanesyan (yellow card) 34'; Oulad Omar 41'; Çinari 45+3', 89'; Manvelyan (yellow card) 70'; Pedro 85'	Stadium: City Stadium; Referee: Henrik Nalbandian

20 October 2024 12	Noah	5–0	Van	Abovyan
19:00 (UTC+4)	Gregório 9'; Oulad Omar 45+2'; Þórarinsson 74'; Aiás 77'; Çinari 90+3'	Report	Klaidher (yellow card) 30'; John (yellow card) 45'	Stadium: City Stadium; Referee: Zaven Hovhannisyan

28 October 2024 13	Ararat-Armenia	0–1	Noah	Yerevan
19:00 (UTC+4)	K.Muradyan (yellow card) 14'; Ambartsumyan (yellow card) 90+2'; Duarte (yellow card) 90+2'	Report	Ferreira 13'; Manvelyan (yellow card) 44'; Hambardzumyan (yellow card) 68'; Oulad Omar (yellow card) 88'; Pablo (yellow card) 90' (yellow-red card) 90'; S.Muradyan (yellow card) 90+1'	Stadium: FFA Stadium; Referee: Henrik Nalbandian

1 November 2024 14	Noah	2–1	Urartu	Abovyan
19:00 (UTC+4)	Oulad Omar 22'; Aiás (yellow card) 51'; Gregório 74'	Report	Simonyan (yellow card) 31'; Ignatyev 45+9'	Stadium: City Stadium; Referee: Hovhannes Kalantaryan

10 November 2024 16	Noah	4–0	Alashkert	Abovyan
19:00 (UTC+4)	Pinson (yellow card) 23'; Hambardzumyan 40'; Oulad Omar 45+3'; Petrosyan 64'; Aiás 75'	Report	B.Hovhannisyan (red card) 13'; Vimercati (yellow card) 20'; Manucharyan (red card) 55'; Hovsepyan (yellow card) 55'	Stadium: City Stadium; Referee: David Mkrtchyan

20 November 2024 17	Noah	4–0	Ararat Yerevan	Abovyan
18:00 (UTC+4)	Muradyan 16'; Sangaré (yellow card) 34'; Pinson 45+5'; Ferreira 58'; Oulad Omar 73'	Report		Stadium: City Stadium; Referee: Ashot Ghaltakhchyan

24 November 2024 15	Pyunik	1–3	Noah	Yerevan
19:00 (UTC+4)	Grigoryan (yellow card) 14'; Alemão (yellow card) 45'; Agdon (yellow card) 60'; Malakyan 88' (pen.); James (yellow card) 90+6'	Report	Mendoza (yellow card) 9' (goal) 80'; Pablo 41', 62'; Čančarević (yellow card) 89'; Aiás (yellow card) 90+3'	Stadium: Junior Sport Stadium; Referee: Henrik Nalbandian

18	Bye
(UTC+4)

4 December 2024 10	Noah	2–1	Ararat-Armenia	Abovyan
18:00 (UTC+4)	Bueno 8' (o.g.); Ferreira (red card) 18'; Pinson (yellow card) 23'; Oulad Omar 45+10'; Sangaré (yellow card) 47'; Hambardzumyan (yellow card) 79'; Čančarević (yellow card) 90+1'	Report	Nondi (yellow card) 16'; Yenne 36'; Ocansey (yellow card) 42'; Bueno (yellow card) 50' (yellow-red card) 90+11'; Queirós (yellow card) 57'; Duarte (yellow card) 72'; Rodríguez (yellow card) 90'	Stadium: City Stadium; Referee: Henrik Nalbandian

8 December 2024 1	Noah	7–0	Gandzasar Kapan	Yerevan
19:00 (UTC+4)	Çinari 6', 11', 29'; Avanesyan 52'; Khudaverdyan 67'; Gregório 77', 86'	Report		Stadium: Republican Stadium; Referee: Ashot Ghaltakhchyan

15 December 2024 3	Noah	7–1	West Armenia	Yerevan
17:00 (UTC+4)	Pinson 13'; Gregório 22', 75', 82', 85'; Silva 26'; Omar 62' (yellow card) 62'	Report	Grigoryan 43'	Stadium: Republican Stadium; Referee: Zaven Hovhannisyan

24 February 2025 20	West Armenia	0–4	Noah	Yerevan
16:00 (UTC+4)	Désiré (yellow card) 44'; Blake (yellow card) 46' (yellow-red card) 58'; Granado (yellow card) 83'	Report	Çinari 11', 64'; Pinson (yellow card) 17'; Dashyan 40'; Gregório 59' (pen.); Zolotić (yellow card) 78'	Stadium: Junior Sport Stadium; Referee: Henrik Nalbandian

2 March 2025 21	Noah	4–0	Shirak	Yerevan
18:00 (UTC+4)	Miljković (yellow card) 20'; Gregório 23', 66'; Çinari 25'; Almeida (yellow card) 50' (goal) 51'; Muradyan (yellow card) 54'; Zolotić (yellow card) 90'	Report	Kodia (yellow card) 33'	Stadium: Republican Stadium; Referee: Yura Mahtesyan

10 March 2025 22	Gandzasar Kapan	0–3	Noah	Yerevan
15:30 (UTC+4)	Mizyed (yellow card) 6'	Report	Manvelyan 28'; Gregório 39', 82'; Þórarinsson (yellow card) 42'; Khudaverdyan (yellow card) 90+2'	Stadium: Junior Sport Stadium; Referee: Tiran Yeritsyan

23	Bye
(UTC+4)

29 March 2025 24	Shirak	1–2	Noah	Gyumri
19:00 (UTC+4)	Misakyan 38'; Vidić (yellow card) 45+3'; Doh (yellow card) 45+4'; Mkrtchyan (yellow card) 75'; Urushanyan (yellow card) 82'	Report	Hambardzumyan 47'; Eteki (yellow card) 68'; Manvelyan 85' (pen.); Almeida (yellow card) 90+2'	Stadium: City Stadium; Referee: Sargis Khachatryan

6 April 2025 25	Noah	5–1	West Armenia	Yerevan
19:00 (UTC+4)	Hambardzumyan 38'; Aiás 50', 90+4'; Makhsudyan 79' (o.g.); Gregório 87'	Report	Israelyan (yellow card) 32'; Grigoryan 77'; Aventisian (yellow card) 90'	Stadium: Republican Stadium; Referee: David Mkrtchyan

9 April 2025 19	Noah	3–0	BKMA Yerevan	Abovyan
16:00 (UTC+4)	Ferreira 2'; Almeida 30'; Gregório (yellow card) 32'; Movsesyan (yellow card) 84'; Çinari 89'	Report	N.Hovhannisyan (yellow card) 65'	Stadium: City Stadium; Referee: Vardan Manukyan
Note: Match originally scheduled for 1 December 2024.

13 April 2025 26	BKMA Yerevan	1–5	Noah	Yerevan
18:30 (UTC+4)	K.Hovhannisyan (yellow card) 40'; Eloyan 60'	Report	Ferreira 10', 15'; Aiás 53'; Çinari 61'; Gregório 90+2' (pen.)	Stadium: FFA Stadium; Referee: Zaven Hovhannisyan

20 April 2025 27	Noah	1–0	Gandzasar Kapan	Abovyan
19:00 (UTC+4)	Manvelyan 72' (pen.); Gregório (yellow card) 86'; Pinson (yellow card) 88'	Report	Faye (yellow card) 2'; Hayrapetyan (yellow card) 38'; Mani (yellow card) 64'; Vopanyan (yellow card) 71'	Stadium: City Stadium; Referee: Vardan Vardumyan

26 April 2025 28	Noah	3–0	Ararat Yerevan	Yerevan
19:00 (UTC+4)	Çinari (yellow card) 41' (goal) 53'; Silva 49'; Gregório 80'	Report	Dombila (yellow card) 70'	Stadium: Republican Stadium; Referee: Hovhannes Kalantaryan

4 May 2025 29	Van	2–2	Noah	Charentsavan
16:00 (UTC+4)	Akorede (yellow card) 1'; Nalbandyan 24'; Touré 66'; Grigoryan (yellow card) 90+1'; Ayvazov (yellow card) 90+2'; Dosso (red card) 90+8'	Report	Miljković (yellow card) 40'; Çinari (yellow card) 45+1'; Zolotić (yellow card) 54'; Ferreira 55'; Čančarević (yellow card) 67'; Silva 90+3'; Manvelyan (yellow card) 90+7'; Gregório (red card) 90+8'	Stadium: City Stadium; Referee: Henrik Nalbandian

9 May 2025 30	Noah	2–1	Pyunik	Abovyan
18:30 (UTC+4)	Hambardzumyan 18'; Zolotić 22'; Khudaverdyan (yellow card) 59'; Ferreira (yellow card) 68'; Eteki (yellow card) 81'	Report	Kovalenko (yellow card) 18'; Kulikov 45+3'; Déblé (yellow card) 81'; Alemão (yellow card) 90'	Stadium: City Stadium; Referee: Hovhannes Kalantaryan

18 May 2025 31	Urartu	3–3	Noah	Yerevan
17:00 (UTC+4)	Melkonyan 9'; Santos (yellow card) 32'; Ayvazyan 43'; Gunko (yellow card) 45+5'; Silva 45+6'; Margaryan (yellow card) 90+4'; Yakovlev (yellow card) 90+4'; Putsko (yellow card) 90+7'	Report	Ferreira 19'; Aiás 26'; Khudaverdyan (yellow card) 42'; Þórarinsson 46'; Silva (yellow card) 81'; Fofana (yellow card) 87'	Stadium: Urartu Stadium; Referee: Ashot Ghaltakhchyan

24 May 2025 32	Noah	2–0	Ararat-Armenia	Abovyan
19:00 (UTC+4)	Muradyan 26'; Pinson (yellow card) 42' (goal) 49'; Hambardzumyan (yellow card) 53'; Ferreira (yellow card) 64'; Sangaré (yellow card) 90+2'	Report	Queirós (yellow card) 36'; Yenne (yellow card) 55'	Stadium: City Stadium; Referee: Sargis Khachatryan

27 May 2025 33	Alashkert	1–0	Noah	Armavir
16:00 (UTC+4)	Metoyan 20'	Report	James (yellow card) 63'; Petrosyan (yellow card) 68'; Khudaverdyan (yellow card) 87'; Coneglian (yellow card) 60'; Gevorgyan (yellow card) 90+7'	Stadium: Armavir City Stadium; Referee: Tiran Yeritsyan

==== Table ====
Pos	Team	Pld	W	D	L	GF	GA	GD	Pts	Qualification or relegation
1	Noah (C)	30	24	3	3	92	20	+72	75	Qualification for the Champions League first qualifying round
2	Ararat-Armenia	30	21	3	6	75	28	+47	66	Qualification for the Conference League second qualifying round (Note: The 2024–25 Armenian Cup winners qualified for the Conference League second qualifying round. Since the cup winners (Noah) qualified based on league position, the Conference League second round spot was passed to the second-placed team, and the second Conference League first round spot was passed to the fourth-placed team.)
3	Urartu	30	19	5	6	64	31	+33	62	Qualification for the Conference League first qualifying round
4	Pyunik	30	17	2	11	59	37	+22	53	Qualification for the Conference League first qualifying round
5	Van	30	15	7	8	56	36	+20	52	
6	BKMA	30	10	6	14	44	54	−10	36	
7	Shirak	30	10	5	15	30	50	−20	35	
8	Ararat Yerevan	30	9	5	16	36	59	−23	32	
9	Alashkert	30	6	8	16	24	52	−28	26	
10	West Armenia (Note: On 7 May 2025, it was announced that West Armenia were on the verge of expulsion after a no show against Ararat-Armenia. On 17 May 2025, they were officially expelled and all games were awarded 3–0 to their opponents.) (D, R)	30	7	2	21	22	78	−56	23	Relegation to the Armenian First League
11	Gandzasar Kapan	30	2	4	24	16	73	−57	10	Spared from relegation

Source: FFA
Rules for classification: 1) Points; 2) Head-to-head points; 3) Head-to-head goal difference; 4) Head-to-head goals scored; 5) Matches won; 6) Goal difference; 7) Less red cards; 8) Less yellow cards; 9) Fair-play ranking 10) Draw
(C) Champions; (D) Disqualified; (R) Relegated

=== Armenian Cup ===
19 February 2025 Second round	Noah	2–0	Alashkert	Yerevan
16:00 (UTC+4)	Çinari (yellow card) 32'; Gregório 40'; Manvelyan 50'; Silva (yellow card) 74'	Report	Manucharyan (yellow card) 36'; Hovsepyan (yellow card) 64'; Avetisyan (yellow card) 81'; A.Hovhannisyan (yellow card) 86'	Stadium: Junior Sport Stadium; Referee: Vardan Manukyan

6 March 2025 Quarter-final 1st leg	Gandzasar Kapan	0–3	Noah	Yerevan
18:00 (UTC+4)	Hayrapetyan (red card) 45+1'; Obonde (yellow card) 47'; Ndidi (yellow card) 79'; Kanda (yellow card) 86'; Matevosyan (yellow card) 90+4'	Report	Muradyan (yellow card) 30'; Aiás 45+2' (pen.); Hambardzumyan 51' (yellow card) 65'; Almeida 87'; Movsesyan (yellow card) 88'	Stadium: Junior Sport Stadium; Referee: Vardan Vardumyan

2 April 2025 Quarter-final 2nd leg	Noah	4–0 (7–0 agg.)	Gandzasar Kapan	Abovyan
18:00 (UTC+4)	Khudaverdyan 12'; Aiás 28'; Pedro (yellow card) 64'; Çinari 82'; Almeida 84'	Report	Tatintsyan (yellow card) 22'; Emmanuel (yellow card) 62'	Stadium: City Stadium; Referee: Hovhannes Kalantaryan

16 April 2025 Semi-final 1st leg	Noah	2–0	Van	Abovyan
18:30 (UTC+4)	Aiás 36'; Hambardzumyan (yellow card) 45+10'; Almeida (yellow card) 53'; Manvelyan (yellow card) 65'; Omar 89'	Report	Sargsyan (yellow card) 45+8'; Beglaryan (red card) 45+16'; Grigoryan (yellow card) 50'	Stadium: City Stadium; Referee: Yura Mahtesyan

30 April 2025 Semi-final 2nd leg	Van	1–0 (1–2 agg.)	Noah	Charentsavan
15:00 (UTC+4)	Odeyinka (yellow card) 25'; Akorede (yellow card) 33'; Bationo (yellow card) 57' (yellow-red card) 90'; Vardanyan 86'	Report	Eteki (yellow card) 26'; Čančarević (yellow card) 33'; Manvelyan (yellow card) 57'; Khudaverdyan (yellow card) 90+6'	Stadium: Charentsavan City Stadium; Referee: Ashot Harutyunyan

13 May 2025 Final	Noah	3–1	Ararat-Armenia	Yerevan
19:00 (UTC+4)	Pinson (yellow card) 37'; Ferreira 40', 57'; Aiás 87'; Eteki (yellow card) 88'; Čančarević (yellow card) 90+4'	Report	Tera (yellow card) 12'; Bueno (yellow card) 37' (yellow-red card) 90+6'; Noubissi 44'	Stadium: Vazgen Sargsyan Republican Stadium; Referee: Ashot Harutyunyan

=== UEFA Conference League ===
==== Qualifying rounds ====
11 July 2024 First qualifying round 1st leg	Noah (Armenia)	2–0	(North Macedonia) Shkëndija	Abovyan, Armenia
20:00 (UTC+4)	Gamboš (yellow card) 41'; Gregório 81'; Miljković 90'	Report		Stadium: City Stadium; Attendance: 3,100; Referee: Viktor Shimusik (Belarus)
Note: Noah play their home matches at Abovyan City Stadium, Abovyan, instead of their regular stadium, City Stadium, Armavir, which did not meet UEFA requirements.

18 July 2024 First qualifying round 2nd leg	Shkëndija (North Macedonia)	1–2 (1–4 agg.)	(Armenia) Noah	Skopje, North Macedonia
22:00 (UTC+4)	Webster (yellow card) 11'; Cake 53'; Trumçi (yellow card) 65'; R.Ramadani (yellow card) 72'; Ademi (yellow card) 80'; Kaba (yellow card) 90+3'	Report	Miljković 20'; Pablo (yellow card) 45+1'; Hambardzumyan (yellow card) 56'; Pinson 90+1'	Stadium: Toše Proeski Arena; Attendance: 2,350; Referee: Dominik Starý (Czech Republic)
Note: Shkëndija played their home match at the Toše Proeski Arena in Skopje, instead of their regular stadium, the Ecolog Arena, in Tetovo, which did not meet UEFA requirements.

25 July 2024 Second qualifying round 1st leg	Noah (Armenia)	7–0	(Malta) Sliema Wanderers	Abovyan, Armenia
20:00 (UTC+4)	Pinson 19'; Gregório 28', 31', 56'; Çinari 72'; Alcino 73' (o.g.); Ferreira 90+1'	Report		Stadium: City Stadium; Attendance: 3,100; Referee: Roman Jitari (Moldova)
Note: Noah play their home matches at Abovyan City Stadium, Abovyan, instead of their regular stadium, City Stadium, Armavir, which did not meet UEFA requirements.

1 August 2024 Second qualifying round 2nd leg	Sliema Wanderers (Malta)	0–0 (0–7 agg.)	(Armenia) Noah	Ta' Qali, Malta
21:00 (UTC+4)	Acheampong (yellow card) 26'; Freire (yellow card) 30'	Report		Stadium: National Stadium; Attendance: 247; Referee: Rob Jenkins (Wales)

6 August 2024 Third qualifying round 1st leg	Noah (Armenia)	3–1	(Greece) AEK Athens	Abovyan, Armenia
20:00 (UTC+4)	Pinson 33'; Gamboš (yellow card) 35'; Pablo (yellow card) 53'; Sangaré (yellow card) 58'; Čančarević 67'; Gregório (yellow card) 69' (goal) 90+8'	Report	García 22'; Ljubičić (yellow card) 58'; Koïta (yellow card) 79'; Rota (yellow card) 83'	Stadium: City Stadium; Attendance: 2,800; Referee: Visar Kastrati (Kosovo)
Note: Noah play their home matches at Abovyan City Stadium, Abovyan, instead of their regular stadium, City Stadium, Armavir, which did not meet UEFA requirements.

15 August 2024 Third qualifying round 2nd leg	AEK Athens (Greece)	1–0 (2–3 agg.)	(Armenia) Noah	Athens, Greece
21:30 (UTC+4)	Ljubičić (yellow card) 15'; Pilios (yellow card) 24'; Szymański (yellow card) 45'; Callens (yellow card) 53'; Vida (yellow card) 60'; Silva 90+2' (o.g.); Rota (yellow card) 90+13'	Report	Ferreira (yellow card) 10'; Gregório (yellow card) 52'; Þórarinsson (yellow card) 68'; Avanesyan (yellow card) 71'; Çinari (yellow card) 78'; Čančarević (yellow card) 90+7'	Stadium: Agia Sophia Stadium; Attendance: 11,468; Referee: Robert Schröder (Germany)

20 August 2024 Play-off round 1st leg	Noah (Armenia)	3–0	(Slovakia) Ružomberok	Abovyan, Armenia
20:00 (UTC+4)	Gregório 4'; Manvelyan 79' (pen.); Aiás 90+3'	Report	Lavrinčík (yellow card) 48'	Stadium: City Stadium; Attendance: 3,100; Referee: Joey Kooij (Netherlands)
Note: Noah play their home matches at Abovyan City Stadium, Abovyan, instead of their regular stadium, City Stadium, Armavir, which did not meet UEFA requirements.

29 August 2024 Play-off round 2nd leg	Ružomberok (Slovakia)	3–1 (3–4 agg.)	(Armenia) Noah	Ružomberok, Slovakia
20:30 (UTC+4)	Luterán 9'; Hladík (yellow card) 13' (goal) 45+2'; Gomola (yellow card) 64'; Boďa 72' (pen.)	Report	Oulad Omar (yellow card) 39'; Miljković (yellow card) 52'; Pablo (yellow card) 57' (yellow-red card) 69'; Dashyan (yellow card) 63'; Čančarević (yellow card) 69'; Aiás 88'	Stadium: Štadión pod Čebraťom; Attendance: 2,535; Referee: John Beaton (Scotland)

==== League phase ====
Pos	Team	Pld	W	D	L	GF	GA	GD	Pts
29	(Swiss Football Association) St. Gallen	6	1	2	3	10	18	−8	5
30	(Football Association of Finland) HJK	6	1	1	4	3	9	−6	4
31	(Football Federation of Armenia) Noah	6	1	1	4	6	16	−10	4
32	(Football Association of Wales) The New Saints	6	1	0	5	5	10	−5	3
33	(Football Federation of Belarus) Dinamo Minsk	6	1	0	5	4	13	−9	3

Source: UEFA
Rules for classification: League phase tiebreakers

Round	1	2	3	4	5	6
Ground	H	A	A	H	H	A
Result	W	L	L	D	L	L
Position	8	18	28	26	31	31

Updated to match(es) played on 20 December 2024. Source: Results
A = Away; H = Home; W = Win; D = Draw; L = Loss

3 October 2024 1	Noah (Armenia)	2–0	(Czech Republic) Mladá Boleslav	Yerevan, Armenia
20:45 (UTC+4)	Aiás 58'; Pinson 76'; Sangaré (yellow card) 87'	Report	Langhamer (yellow card) 40'; Vydra (yellow card) 79'	Stadium: Republican Stadium; Attendance: 8,000; Referee: Radoslav Gidzhenov (Bulgaria)
Note: Noah play their home matches at Vazgen Sargsyan Republican Stadium, Yerevan, instead of their regular stadium, City Stadium, Armavir, which did not meet UEFA requirements.

24 October 2024 2	Rapid Wien (Austria)	1–0	(Armenia) Noah	Vienna, Austria
22:45 (UTC+4)	Beljo 31'; Bolla (yellow card) 80'	Report	Aiás (yellow card) 34'; Sangaré (yellow card) 36'	Stadium: Allianz Stadion; Attendance: 18,600; Referee: Kristo Tohver (Estonia)

8 November 2024 3	Chelsea (England)	8–0	(Armenia) Noah	London, England
00:00 (UTC+4)	Adarabioyo 12'; Guiu 13'; Disasi 18'; Félix 21', 41'; Mudryk 39'; Nkunku 69', 76' (pen.)	Report	Sangaré (yellow card) 59'; Çinari (yellow card) 90+4'	Stadium: Stamford Bridge; Attendance: 38,305; Referee: Christian-Petru Ciochirca (Austria)

28 November 2024 4	Noah (Armenia)	0–0	(Iceland) Víkingur Reykjavík	Yerevan, Armenia
21:45 (UTC+4)	Hambardzumyan (yellow card) 57'	Report	Hansen (yellow card) 89'	Stadium: Republican Stadium; Attendance: 5,000; Referee: Menelaos Antoniou (Cyprus)

12 December 2024 5	Noah (Armenia)	1–3	(Cyprus) APOEL	Yerevan, Armenia
21:45 (UTC+4)	Aias (yellow card) 45+3' (goal) 45+4'; Ferreira (yellow card) 51'	Report	Chebake 23'; Kostadinov 89'; Abagna 90+3'	Stadium: Republican Stadium; Attendance: 7,500; Referee: Miloš Milanović (Serbia)
Note: Noah play their home matches at Vazgen Sargsyan Republican Stadium, Yerevan, instead of their regular stadium, City Stadium, Armavir, which did not meet UEFA requirements.

20 December 2024 6	TSC (Serbia)	4–3	(Armenia) Noah	Bačka Topola, Serbia
00:00 (UTC+4)	Stanić 41'; Đakovac 74', 76'; Pantović 81'	Report	Aiás 5', 48'; Ferreira 15'	Stadium: TSC Arena; Attendance: 1,210; Referee: Marian Barbu (Romania)

== Squad statistics ==
As of match played 27 May 2025

=== Appearances and goals ===
No.	Pos	Nat	Player	Total		Premier League		Armenian Cup		Conference League	
No.	Pos	Nat	Player	Apps	Goals	Apps	Goals	Apps	Goals	Apps	Goals
3	DF	(Armenia) ARM	Sergey Muradyan	42	2	22+3	2	4+1	0	7+5	0
4	DF	(Iceland) ISL	Guðmundur Þórarinsson	26	2	12+2	2	2+1	0	8+1	0
5	DF	(Brazil) BRA	James Santos	8	0	3+2	0	2+1	0	0	0
6	DF	(Brazil) BRA	Marcos Pedro	12	1	4+4	1	2+1	0	0+1	0
7	FW	(Portugal) POR	Hélder Ferreira	42	13	20+3	9	5	2	13+1	2
8	FW	(Portugal) POR	Gonçalo Gregório	43	27	19+7	20	2+1	1	7+7	6
9	FW	(Brazil) BRA	Matheus Aiás	41	19	11+10	9	3+3	4	8+6	6
10	MF	(Armenia) ARM	Artak Dashyan	21	1	6+6	1	1+1	0	3+4	0
11	FW	(Albania) ALB	Eraldo Çinari	43	16	18+8	14	2+3	1	8+4	1
14	DF	(Argentina) ARG	Bryan Mendoza	23	1	9+6	1	1	0	3+4	0
17	MF	(Burkina Faso) BFA	Gustavo Sangaré	34	0	13+5	0	2+1	0	10+3	0
18	FW	(Armenia) ARM	Artyom Avanesyan	24	1	9+6	1	0	0	2+7	0
19	DF	(Armenia) ARM	Hovhannes Hambardzumyan	37	4	20+3	3	4+1	1	5+4	0
20	MF	(Slovakia) SVK	Martin Gamboš	17	0	6+3	0	0+1	0	7	0
21	MF	(Portugal) POR	Bruno Almeida	16	4	5+7	2	4	2	0	0
22	GK	(Armenia) ARM	Ognjen Čančarević	29	1	16	0	3	0	10	1
24	FW	(Armenia) ARM	Zaven Khudaverdyan	20	2	4+12	1	2+2	1	0	0
26	DF	(Serbia) SRB	Aleksandar Miljković	29	2	9+5	0	1+2	0	10+2	2
27	MF	(Armenia) ARM	Gor Manvelyan	40	5	19+4	3	4+1	1	8+4	1
29	GK	(Brazil) BRA	Arthur Coneglian	3	0	1	0	2	0	0	0
30	FW	(Armenia) ARM	Grenik Petrosyan	29	2	4+16	2	1+2	0	0+6	0
37	DF	(Portugal) POR	Gonçalo Silva	43	3	24+2	3	4	0	13	0
40	DF	(Armenia) ARM	Hovhannes Gevorgyan	1	0	0+1	0	0	0	0	0
44	DF	(Bosnia and Herzegovina) BIH	Nermin Zolotić	17	1	10+1	1	4+2	0	0	0
50	MF	(Armenia) ARM	Gagik Meloyan	2	0	1+1	0	0	0	0	0
55	MF	(Armenia) ARM	Artur Movsesyan	7	0	1+4	0	0+2	0	0	0
61	DF	(Armenia) ARM	Gor Grigoryan	1	0	0+1	0	0	0	0	0
65	MF	(Armenia) ARM	Gor Abrahamyan	1	0	0+1	0	0	0	0	0
67	FW	(Armenia) ARM	Andranik Karapetyan	1	0	1	0	0	0	0	0
68	MF	(Armenia) ARM	Gevorg Grigoryan	1	0	0+1	0	0	0	0	0
71	FW	(France) FRA	Bilal Fofana	2	0	0+2	0	0	0	0	0
81	MF	(Netherlands) NED	Imran Oulad Omar	36	9	15+6	8	2+2	1	7+4	0
88	MF	(Cameroon) CMR	Yan Eteki	32	0	11+12	0	5	0	4	0
92	GK	(Russia) RUS	Aleksey Ploshchadny	18	0	13	0	1	0	4	0
93	FW	(France) FRA	Virgile Pinson	40	8	18+4	4	3+2	0	9+4	4
Players away on loan:
Players who left Noah during the season:
28	DF	(Brazil) BRA	Pablo Santos	15	2	6+1	2	0	0	8	0

=== Goal scorers ===
Place	Position	Nation	Number	Name	Premier League	Armenian Cup	Conference League	Total
1	FW	(Portugal)	8	Gonçalo Gregório	20	1	6	27
2	FW	(Brazil)	9	Matheus Aiás	9	4	6	19
3	FW	(Albania)	11	Eraldo Çinari	14	1	1	16
4	FW	(Portugal)	7	Hélder Ferreira	9	2	2	13
5	MF	(Netherlands)	81	Imran Oulad Omar	8	1	0	9
6	FW	(France)	93	Virgile Pinson	4	0	4	8
7	DF	(Armenia)	19	Hovhannes Hambardzumyan	4	1	0	5
7	MF	(Armenia)	27	Gor Manvelyan	3	1	1	5
9	MF	(Portugal)	21	Bruno Almeida	2	2	0	4
10	DF	(Portugal)	37	Gonçalo Silva	3	0	0	3
10				Own goal	2	0	1	3
12	FW	(Armenia)	30	Grenik Petrosyan	2	0	0	2
12	DF	(Brazil)	28	Pablo Santos	2	0	0	2
12	DF	(Iceland)	4	Guðmundur Þórarinsson	2	0	0	2
12	DF	(Armenia)	3	Sergey Muradyan	2	0	0	2
12	FW	(Armenia)	24	Zaven Khudaverdyan	1	1	0	2
12	DF	(Serbia)	26	Aleksandar Miljković	0	0	2	2
18	DF	(Brazil)	6	Marcos Pedro	1	0	0	1
18	DF	(Argentina)	14	Bryan Mendoza	1	0	0	1
18	FW	(Armenia)	18	Artyom Avanesyan	1	0	0	1
18	MF	(Armenia)	10	Artak Dashyan	1	0	0	1
18	DF	(Bosnia and Herzegovina)	44	Nermin Zolotić	1	0	0	1
18	GK	(Armenia)	22	Ognjen Čančarević	0	0	1	1
				TOTALS	92	15	24	131

=== Clean sheets ===
Place	Position	Nation	Number	Name	Premier League	Armenian Cup	Conference League	Total
1	GK	(Russia)	92	Aleksey Ploshchadny	10	1	2	13
2	GK	(Armenia)	22	Ognjen Čančarević	5	1	4	10
3	GK	(Brazil)	29	Arthur Coneglian	0	2	0	2
				TOTALS	15	4	6	25

=== Disciplinary record ===
Number	Nation	Position	Name	Premier League		Armenian Cup		Conference League		Total	
Number	Nation	Position	Name	Booked	Sent off (straight red)	Booked	Sent off (straight red)	Booked	Sent off (straight red)	Booked	Sent off (straight red)
3	(Armenia)	DF	Sergey Muradyan	2	0	1	0	0	0	3	0
4	(Iceland)	DF	Guðmundur Þórarinsson	1	0	0	0	1	0	2	0
5	(Brazil)	DF	James Santos	1	0	0	0	0	0	1	0
6	(Brazil)	DF	Marcos Pedro	0	0	1	0	0	0	1	0
7	(Portugal)	FW	Hélder Ferreira	3	1	0	0	2	0	5	1
8	(Portugal)	FW	Gonçalo Gregório	2	1	0	0	2	0	4	1
9	(Brazil)	FW	Matheus Aiás	3	0	0	0	2	0	5	0
10	(Armenia)	MF	Artak Dashyan	1	0	0	0	1	0	2	0
11	(Albania)	FW	Eraldo Çinari	2	0	1	0	3	0	6	0
16	(Argentina)	DF	Bryan Mendoza	2	0	0	0	0	0	2	0
17	(Burkina Faso)	MF	Gustavo Sangaré	3	0	0	0	4	0	7	0
18	(Armenia)	FW	Artyom Avanesyan	1	0	0	0	1	0	2	0
19	(Armenia)	DF	Hovhannes Hambardzumyan	3	0	2	0	1	0	6	0
20	(Slovakia)	MF	Martin Gamboš	1	0	0	0	2	0	3	0
21	(Portugal)	MF	Bruno Almeida	2	0	1	0	0	0	3	0
22	(Armenia)	GK	Ognjen Čančarević	4	0	2	0	2	0	8	0
24	(Armenia)	FW	Zaven Khudaverdyan	4	0	1	0	0	0	5	0
26	(Serbia)	DF	Aleksandar Miljković	4	0	0	0	1	0	5	0
27	(Armenia)	MF	Gor Manvelyan	5	0	2	0	0	0	7	0
29	(Brazil)	GK	Arthur Coneglian	1	0	0	0	0	0	1	0
30	(Armenia)	FW	Grenik Petrosyan	1	0	0	0	0	0	1	0
37	(Portugal)	DF	Gonçalo Silva	2	0	0	0	0	0	2	0
40	(Armenia)	DF	Hovhannes Gevorgyan	1	0	0	0	0	0	1	0
44	(Bosnia and Herzegovina)	DF	Nermin Zolotić	3	0	0	0	0	0	3	0
55	(Armenia)	MF	Artur Movsesyan	1	0	1	0	0	0	2	0
71	(France)	FW	Bilal Fofana	1	0	0	0	0	0	1	0
81	(Netherlands)	MF	Imran Oulad Omar	2	0	0	0	1	0	3	0
88	(Cameroon)	MF	Yan Eteki	4	1	2	0	0	0	6	1
92	(Russia)	GK	Aleksey Ploshchadny	1	0	0	0	0	0	1	0
93	(France)	FW	Virgile Pinson	7	0	1	0	0	0	8	0
Players away on loan:
Players who left Noah during the season:
28	(Brazil)	DF	Pablo Santos	2	1	0	0	4	1	6	2
			TOTALS	69	4	14	0	27	1	110	5
