= Virgile Pinson =

French footballer (born 1996)

Personal information
- Full name: Virgile Jacky Marcel Pinson
- Date of birth: 22 February 1996 (age 30)
- Place of birth: Cenon, France
- Height: 1.77 m (5 ft 10 in)
- Position: Forward

Team information
- Current team: Torpedo Kutaisi
- Number: 39

Youth career
- 2008–2014: Le Havre
- 2004–2015: Clermont

Senior career*
Years	Team	Apps	(Gls)
2014–2015	Clermont II	1	(0)
2015–2016	Woluwe-Zaventem	9	(0)
2016–2017	Limoges	22	(2)
2017	Antalyaspor	0	(0)
2018–2020	Reims II	15	(6)
2018–2020	Reims	1	(0)
2020–2021	Quevilly-Rouen	23	(0)
2021–2022	Lokomotiv Sofia	24	(1)
2022–2024	Botoșani	35	(1)
2024–2026	Noah	37	(7)
2026	Maccabi Bnei Reineh	9	(0)
2026–	Torpedo Kutaisi	5	(0)
- * Club domestic league appearances and goals as of 6 October 2026

Virgile Jacky Marcel Pinson (born 22 February 1996) is a French professional footballer who plays as a forward for Erovnuli Liga club Torpedo Kutaisi.

== Career ==
Pinson is a youth product of Le Havre, joining them at 12 and playing with their youth academy for six years.

=== Reims ===
On 23 April 2018, Pinson joined Reims from Antalyaspor. He made his professional debut with Reims in a 1–0 Ligue 1 loss to HSC Montpellier on 1 September 2018.

=== Quevilly-Rouen ===
Pinson joined Quevilly-Rouen at the end of September 2020, after being released by Reims.

=== Lokomotiv Sofia ===
On 7 September 2021, Pinson agreed to a two-year deal at Lokomotiv Sofia.

=== Botoșani ===
On 20 September 2022, Pinson agreed to a two-year deal at Botoșani.

==== Match fixing & betting scandal ====
On 23 October 2023, Pinson deliberately kicked the ball after a free-kick was given to the opposition to be booked in the 42 minute game against Sepsi Sf. Gheorghe after Drolé, another FC Botosani player that was a substitute for that game found out that Pinson was about to be substituted at half-time. A betting agency in Botosani reported that someone intended on betting 10.000 RON (approx. 2500 EUR) on Pinson being booked during the game.

Pinson and Drolé were consequently excluded from the first team.

=== Noah ===
On 29 February 2024, Armenian Premier League club Noah announced the signing of Pinson. On 6 February 2025, Noah announced that they had extended their contract with Pinson until the summer of 2026, with an option for another year.

=== Maccabi Bnei Reineh ===
On 12 February 2026, Israeli Premier League club Maccabi Bnei Reineh announced the signing of Pinson.

=== Torpedo Kutaisi ===
In July 2026, Pinson moved to Erovnuli Liga club Torpedo Kutaisi on a 1.5-year deal with an option to extend it to another year.

== Personal life ==
Born in France, Pinson is of Cameroonian descent.

== Career statistics ==
=== Club ===
As of match played 20 September 2025

Appearances and goals by club, season and competition
Club	Season	League			National Cup		Continental		Other		Total	
Club	Season	Division	Apps	Goals	Apps	Goals	Apps	Goals	Apps	Goals	Apps	Goals
Noah	2023–24	Armenian Premier League	12	1	1	0	—		—		13	1
Noah	2024–25	Armenian Premier League	22	4	5	0	13 (Note: Appearances and goals in the UEFA Europa Conference League)	4	—		40	8
Noah	2025–26	Armenian Premier League	3	2	0	0	6 (Note: Two appearances in the UEFA Champions League, two appearances in the UEFA Europa League, and two appearances in the UEFA Conference League.)	0	—		9	2
Noah	Total		37	7	6	0	19	4	0	0	62	11
Career total			37	7	6	0	19	4	0	0	62	11
