= Sergey Muradyan =

Armenian footballer

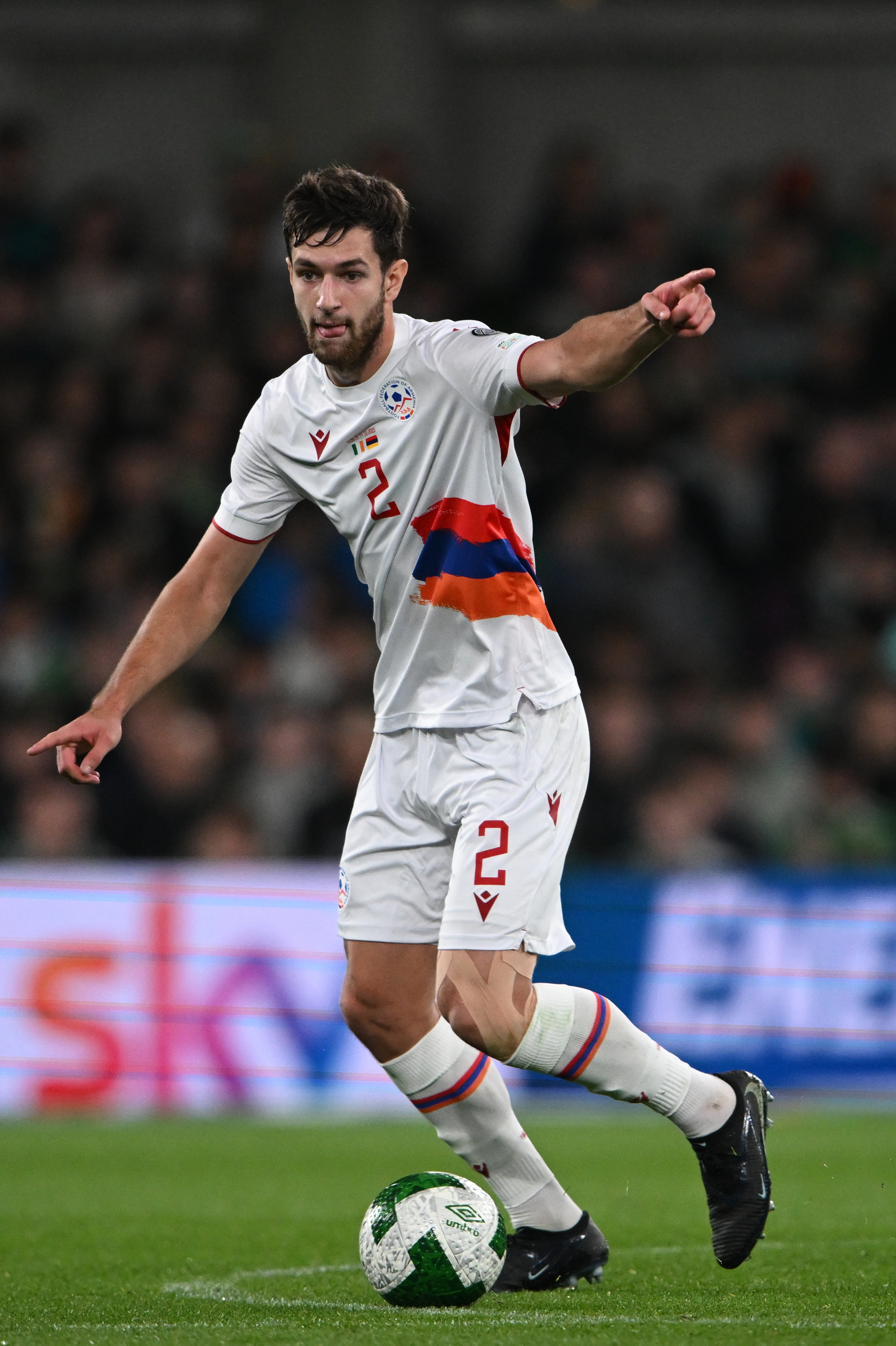
- Muradyan with Armenia in 2025

Personal information
- Full name: Sergey Lernikovich Muradyan
- Date of birth: 27 August 2004 (age 22)
- Place of birth: Saint Petersburg, Russia
- Height: 1.89 m (6 ft 2 in)
- Position: Centre-back

Team information
- Current team: Noah
- Number: 3

Youth career
- –2018: Dynamo St. Petersburg
- 2019–2023: Zenit St. Petersburg

Senior career*
Years	Team	Apps	(Gls)
2022	Zenit-2 St. Petersburg	0	(0)
2023–	Noah	81	(4)

International career^{‡}
2019	Armenia U15	3	(0)
2021–2022	Armenia U18	3	(0)
2022	Armenia U19	7	(0)
2023	Armenia U21	6	(0)
2024–	Armenia	16	(0)
- * Club domestic league appearances and goals as of 18 June 2026 ‡ National team caps and goals as of 29 March 2026

Sergey Lernikovich Muradyan (Armenian: Սերգեյ Մուրադյան; Russian: Сергей Лерникович Мурадян; born 27 August 2004) is a football player who plays as a centre-back for Armenian Premier League club Noah. Born in Russia, he represents the Armenia national team.

== Club career ==
At young age, he played for the youth teams of two major football clubs in Saint Petersburg, such as Dynamo and Zenit, after some time he also played for the local university in the student's league.

Playing for Zenit's youth teams, he became the champion of Russia under 19 (Youth Football League-1) and 18 (Youth Football League-2) years old during the 2020–2021 season, after he again won the Russian championship under 19 years old in the 2022/2023 season.

On 17 February 2023, Muradyan terminated his contract with the Russian champions Zenit St. Petersburg (where he played for the Under-19 squad) by mutual consent and moved to the Armenian club Noah.

== International career ==
At 3 June 2023, he received his first call-up to the Armenian senior national team squad for a UEFA Euro 2024 qualifying matches against Wales and Latvia.

Muradyan made his debut for the senior Armenia national team on 26 March 2024 in a friendly against the Czech Republic.

== Career statistics ==
As of match played 1 November 2025

Appearances and goals by club, season and competition
Club	Season	League			National Cup		Continental		Other		Total	
Club	Season	Division	Apps	Goals	Apps	Goals	Apps	Goals	Apps	Goals	Apps	Goals
Noah	2022–23	Armenian Premier League	14	0	0	0	—		—		14	0
Noah	2023–24	Armenian Premier League	24	1	1	0	—		—		25	1
Noah	2024–25	Armenian Premier League	25	2	5	0	12 (Note: Appearances in UEFA Conference League)	0	—		42	2
Noah	2025–26	Armenian Premier League	9	0	0	0	10 (Note: Four appearances in the UEFA Champions League, two appearances in the UEFA Europa League, and four appearances in the UEFA Conference League)	0	—		19	0
Noah	Total		72	3	6	0	22	0	-	-	100	3
Career total			72	3	6	0	22	0	-	-	100	3

=== International ===
As of 29 March 2026

Armenia
Year	Apps	Goals
2024	6	0
2025	9	0
2026	1	0
Total	16	0

== Honours ==
Noah

- Armenian Premier League: 2024–25
- Armenian Cup: 2024–25
- Armenian Supercup: 2025
