= Gonçalo Gregório =

Portuguese footballer

Personal information
- Full name: Gonçalo de Almeida Gregório
- Date of birth: 14 June 1995 (age 31)
- Place of birth: Lisbon, Portugal
- Height: 1.84 m (6 ft 0 in)
- Position: Forward

Team information
- Current team: Waldhof Mannheim
- Number: 9

Youth career
- 2003–2007: Estoril
- 2007–2014: Belenenses
- 2013–2014: → Vitória Setúbal (loan)

Senior career*
Years	Team	Apps	(Gls)
2014–2016	Belenenses	0	(0)
2014	→ Loures (loan)	12	(3)
2015–2016	→ Casa Pia (loan)	44	(13)
2016–2017	Leixões	11	(1)
2017	→ Farense (loan)	10	(2)
2017	Vilafranquense	15	(3)
2018–2019	Casa Pia	31	(24)
2019–2020	Paços de Ferreira	8	(0)
2019–2020	→ Braga B (loan)	24	(19)
2020–2021	Zagłębie Sosnowiec	27	(5)
2021–2023	União Leiria	50	(25)
2023–2024	Dinamo București	37	(7)
2024–2026	Noah	26	(20)
2026–	Waldhof Mannheim	0	(0)
- * Club domestic league appearances and goals as of 27 May 2026

Gonçalo de Almeida Gregório (born 14 June 1995) is a Portuguese professional footballer who plays as a forward for German 3. Liga club Waldhof Mannheim.

== Career ==
Born in Lisbon, Gregório spent most of his youth career in the ranks of local C.F. Os Belenenses. He never made the first team, but had loans to Vitória FC, G.S. Loures and Casa Pia AC, the latter two as a senior in the third tier.

In June 2016, Gregório rescinded his contract with the team from Belém and joined Leixões S.C. of the Segunda Liga. He made his debut on 31 July in a 2016–17 Taça da Liga match against C.D. Cova da Piedade. He made 13 total appearances for the team from Matosinhos, scoring as a substitute for Kikas in a 2–2 comeback win at home to S.C. Braga B on 19 October. On 2 January 2017, he went back to the third division on loan to S.C. Farense until the end of the season.

Gregório signed for U.D. Vilafranquense on 31 May 2017, on a one-year deal with the option of a second. The following January, he returned to Casa Pia. He scored 22 goals in 17 games in the first half of 2018–19, including three hat-tricks, of which one was a four-goal haul in a 7–0 win at Redondense FC on 9 December.

On 31 January 2019, Gregório signed a 3 1/2-year deal at F.C. Paços de Ferreira. He played eight games, just one start, as they won promotion to the Primeira Liga as champions. On 2 July, he was loaned to S.C. Braga for the upcoming season with the option to buy.

On 24 August 2020, Gregório signed a two-year contract with Polish club Zagłębie Sosnowiec.

On 1 July 2023, it was announced that Gregório signed with Liga I club Dinamo București. On 22 July 2023, he scored his first goal for the club, in the 2–1 loss in the eternal derby against FCSB. On 19 August 2023, he scored in the 3–2 away win against Voluntari. In the following game, on 26 August 2023, he scored again, in the 1–1 draw against Petrolul Ploiești. He was released at the end of the 2023-24 season.

On 2 July 2024, Noah announced the signing of Gregório from Dinamo București.

== Personal life ==
Gregório's father Rui played professionally as a defender, mainly for Belenenses.

== Career statistics ==
As of match played 22 July 2025

Appearances and goals by club, season and competition
Club	Season	League			National cup (Note: Includes Taça de Portugal, Cupa României, Armenian Cup)		League cup (Note: Includes Taça da Liga)		Continental		Other		Total	
Club	Season	Division	Apps	Goals	Apps	Goals	Apps	Goals	Apps	Goals	Apps	Goals	Apps	Goals
Os Belenenses	2014–15	Primeira Liga	0	0	0	0	0	0	—		—		0	0
Os Belenenses	2015–16	Primeira Liga	0	0	0	0	0	0	0	0	—		0	0
Os Belenenses	Total		0	0	0	0	0	0	0	0	0	0	0	0
Loures (loan)	2014–15	Campeonato de Portugal	12	3	0	0	—		—		—		12	3
Casa Pia (loan)	2014–15	Campeonato de Portugal	12	1	0	0	—		—		—		12	1
Casa Pia (loan)	2015–16	Campeonato de Portugal	32	12	1	0	—		—		—		33	12
Casa Pia (loan)	Total		44	13	1	0	0	0	0	0	0	0	45	13
Leixões	2016–17	LigaPro	11	1	1	0	1	0	—		—		13	1
Farense (loan)	2016–17	Campeonato de Portugal	10	2	0	0	—		—		—		10	2
Vilafranquense	2017–18	Campeonato de Portugal	15	3	1	0	—		—		—		16	3
Casa Pia	2017–18	Campeonato de Portugal	13	2	0	0	—		—		—		13	2
Casa Pia	2018–19	Campeonato de Portugal	18	22	1	1	—		—		—		19	23
Casa Pia	Total		31	24	1	1	0	0	0	0	0	0	32	25
Paços de Ferreira	2018–19	LigaPro	8	0	0	0	—		—		—		8	0
Paços de Ferreira	2019–20	Primeira Liga	0	0	0	0	0	0	—		—		0	0
Paços de Ferreira	Total		8	0	0	0	0	0	0	0	0	0	8	0
Braga B (loan)	2019–20	Campeonato de Portugal	24	19	0	0	—		—		—		24	19
Zagłębie Sosnowiec	2020–21	I liga	27	5	0	0	—		—		—		27	5
U.D. Leiria	2021–22	Liga 3	28	14	1	0	—		—		—		41	14
U.D. Leiria	2022–23	Liga 3	22	11	0	0	—		—		—		41	11
U.D. Leiria	Total		50	25	1	0	0	0	0	0	0	0	51	25
Dinamo București	2023–24	Liga I	37	7	2	1	—		—		2	0	41	8
Noah	2024–25	Armenian Premier League	26	20	3	1	—		14 (Note: Appearances in UEFA Conference League)	6	—		43	27
Noah	2025–26	Armenian Premier League	0	0	0	0	—		3 (Note: Appearances in UEFA Champions League)	0	—		3	0
Noah	Total		26	20	3	1	—		17	6	—		46	27
Career total			295	122	10	3	1	0	17	6	2	0	325	131

== Honours ==
Paços de Ferreira

- LigaPro: 2018–19

União de Leiria

- Liga 3: 2022–23

Individual

- Campeonato de Portugal top scorer: 2018–19 (22 goals)
- Liga 3 top scorer: 2021–22 (14 goals)
- Armenian Premier League top scorer: 2024-25 (20 goals)
