= Friday Adams =

Nigerian footballer

Personal information
- Date of birth: 23 November 2002 (age 23)
- Place of birth: Kaduna, Nigeria
- Height: 1.72 m (5 ft 8 in)
- Positions: Full-back; winger

Team information
- Current team: Universitatea Cluj
- Number: 12

Youth career
- Methodist Football Institution
- –2020: Ikon Allah Kaduna
- 2021–2022: FDC Vista

Senior career*
Years	Team	Apps	(Gls)
2022–2023	Noah	33	(2)
2023–2026	Botoșani	73	(1)
2026–	Universitatea Cluj	9	(0)
- * Club domestic league appearances and goals as of 7 November 2026

Friday Adams (born 23 November 2002) is a Nigerian professional footballer who plays as a full-back or a winger for Liga I club Universitatea Cluj.

== Career statistics ==
As of match played 7 November 2026

Appearances and goals by club, season and competition
Club	Season	League			National cup (Note: Includes Armenian Cup, Cupa României)		Europe		Other		Total	
Club	Season	Division	Apps	Goals	Apps	Goals	Apps	Goals	Apps	Goals	Apps	Goals
Noah	2022–23	Armenian Premier League	33	2	2	0	—		—		35	2
Botoșani	2023–24	Liga I	19	0	4	0	—		0	0	23	0
Botoșani	2024–25	Liga I	30	1	1	0	—		—		31	1
Botoșani	2025–26	Liga I	24	0	2	0	—		1 (Note: Appearance in Liga I European play-offs)	0	27	0
Botoșani	Total		73	1	7	0	—		1	0	81	1
Universitatea Cluj	2026–27	Liga I	9	0	1	0	3 (Note: Two appearances in UEFA Europa League, one appearance in UEFA Conference League)	0	1 (Note: Appearance in Supercupa României)	0	14	0
Career total			115	3	10	0	3	0	2	0	130	3

== Honours ==
Universitatea Cluj

- Supercupa României runner-up: 2026
