= Peter Olawale =

Nigerian footballer

Personal information
- Full name: Peter Ukeme Olawale
- Date of birth: 26 July 2002 (age 24)
- Height: 1.70 m (5 ft 7 in)
- Position: Forward

Youth career
- –2020: Tripple 44 FC
- 2020–2021: Hapoel Ra'anana

Senior career*
Years	Team	Apps	(Gls)
2021–2022	Hapoel Ra'anana	44	(16)
2022–2023	Debrecen	4	(0)
2023	→ Noah (loan)	11	(0)
2023–2024	Balzan	7	(0)
2024	Hapoel Ramat Gan	18	(3)
2024–2025	Hapoel Nof HaGalil	29	(3)
2025–2026	Mesaimeer	3	(2)

International career
2019	Nigeria U17	2	(1)
- * Club domestic league appearances and goals as of 15 June 2025

Peter Ukeme Olawale (born 26 July 2002) is a Nigerian footballer who plays as a forward.

== Early life and career ==
Olawale developed as a youth player at Tripple 44 Football Academy in Ibadan, an academy founded by Nigerian football administrator Samuel Olatunji Okuku.

During his time at the academy, he attracted attention for his attacking abilities and was regarded as one of Nigeria’s most promising young forwards. He later moved abroad, signing for Israeli club Hapoel Ra'anana A.F.C. as a teenager.

== International career ==
In 2019, Olawale was called up to the Nigeria U-17 national team for the FIFA U-17 World Cup in Brazil. He was part of the squad selected by coach Manu Garba and featured in the tournament as Nigeria progressed through the group stages.

Prior to his call-up, Olawale had impressed at club level with Tripple 44 Football Academy, helping them maintain a 30-game unbeaten run in domestic competitions, further highlighting his potential for national team selection

== Career statistics ==
=== Club ===
As of 4 February 2024

Club	Season	League			State Cup		League Cup		Continental		Other		Total	
Club	Season	Division	Apps	Goals	Apps	Goals	Apps	Goals	Apps	Goals	Apps	Goals	Apps	Goals
Hapoel Ra'anana	2020–21	Liga Leumit	13	7	1	0	0	0	–		0	0	14	7
Hapoel Ra'anana	2021–22	Liga Leumit	31	9	1	0	0	0	–		0	0	32	9
Hapoel Ra'anana	Total		44	16	2	0	0	0	–		0	0	46	16
Debrecen	2022–23	Nemzeti Bajnokság I	4	0	1	1	0	0	–		0	0	5	1
Debrecen	2022–23	Armenian Premier League	11	0	0	0	0	0	–		0	0	11	0
Balzan	2023–24	Maltese Premier League	9	0	0	0	0	0	4	1	0	0	13	1
Hapoel Ramat Gan	2023–24	Liga Leumit	18	3	0	0	0	0	–		0	0	18	3
Hapoel Nof HaGalil	2024–25	Liga Leumit	0	0	0	0	0	0	–		0	0	0	0
Career total			86	19	3	1	0	0	4	1	0	0	93	21
