= Bryan Mendoza (footballer, born 1993) =

Argentine professional footballer (born 1993)

Personal information
- Date of birth: 14 March 1993 (age 33)
- Place of birth: Latina, Italy
- Height: 1.80 m (5 ft 11 in)
- Position: Left back

Team information
- Current team: Boca Unidos

Senior career*
Years	Team	Apps	(Gls)
2012–2015	Sacachispas		
2016	Deportivo Armenio	5	(0)
2016–2018	Sacachispas	31	(0)
2018–2019	Barracas Central	1	(0)
2019–2021	Botoșani	5	(0)
2020	→ Petrolul Ploiești (loan)	10	(0)
2021	→ Comuna Recea (loan)	14	(1)
2022–2024	Botev Vratsa	65	(1)
2024–2025	Noah	15	(1)
2026–	Boca Unidos	2	(0)
- * Club domestic league appearances and goals as of 17:07, 30 March 2026 (UTC)

Bryan Mendoza (born 14 March 1993) is an Argentine professional footballer who plays as a left back for Boca Unidos.

== Career ==
Mendoza started his career with Sacachispas. He stayed with the club in Primera C Metropolitana for three years from 2012, prior to joining Deportivo Armenio. Five appearances followed in the 2016 Primera B Metropolitana as they suffered relegation. Mendoza sealed a return to Sacachispas in June 2016, with the club gaining promotion to Primera B Metropolitana in his first campaign back. After featuring thirty-two times in 2017–18, which took his tally to one hundred and twenty-eight games and nine goals. Mendoza moved to Barracas Central in June 2018. His debut came in May 2019 in a loss to All Boys.

Ahead of the 2019–20 season, Mendoza headed off to Romania to sign with Botoșani of Liga I. He made five appearances across the 2019–20 campaign, though just one of which was as a starter; versus Astra Giurgiu on 10 July 2020. On 31 August, days after making his UEFA Europa League bow in a first round qualifier against Ordabasy, Mendoza was loaned to Liga II club Petrolul Ploiești for one season. After ten appearances, nine of which were as a starter, his loan was terminated in January 2021. In July 2022 Mendoza joined Bulgarian team Botev Vratsa.

== Honours ==
Sacachispas

- Primera C Metropolitana: 2016–17

Barracas Central

- Primera B Metropolitana: 2018–19
