= Aleksandr Nesterov =

Russian footballer

Personal information
- Full name: Aleksandr Sergeyevich Nesterov
- Date of birth: 24 March 2000 (age 26)
- Place of birth: Samara, Russia
- Height: 1.90 m (6 ft 3 in)
- Position: Defender

Team information
- Current team: KDV Tomsk
- Number: 2

Youth career
- –2020: Krylia Sovetov

Senior career*
Years	Team	Apps	(Gls)
2017–2018	Krylia Sovetov-2	3	(0)
2020–2021	Orenburg	0	(0)
2020–2021	→ Orenburg-2	18	(1)
2021	Akron Tolyatti	7	(0)
2022	Dynamo Stavropol	13	(0)
2022	Noah	9	(0)
2023–2025	Chayka Peschanokopskoye	27	(1)
2025–	KDV Tomsk	30	(2)
- * Club domestic league appearances and goals as of 1 November 2026

Aleksandr Sergeyevich Nesterov (Russian: Александр Сергеевич Нестеров; born 24 March 2000) is a Russian football player who plays for KDV Tomsk.

== Club career ==
Nesterov made his debut in the Russian Football National League for Akron Tolyatti on 10 July 2021 in a game against SKA-Khabarovsk.

On 27 December 2022, Nesterov terminated his contract with Noah by mutual consent.
