= Raul Bălbărău =

Romanian footballer

Personal information
- Full name: Andrei Raul Bălbărău
- Date of birth: 7 April 2001 (age 25)
- Place of birth: Galați, Romania
- Height: 1.89 m (6 ft 2 in)
- Position: Goalkeeper

Team information
- Current team: Bnei Sakhnin
- Number: 1

Youth career
- Oțelul Galați
- –2019: Petrosport Ploiești

Senior career*
| Years | Team | Apps | (Gls) |
| 2019–2020 | CSM Slatina | | |
| 2020–2022 | CSA Steaua București | 24 | (0) |
| 2022–2023 | Debrecen | 0 | (0) |
| 2023 | → Noah (loan) | 10 | (0) |
| 2024–2026 | Petrolul Ploiești | 45 | (0) |
| 2026– | Bnei Sakhnin | 10 | (0) |

International career
| 2022 | Romania U21 | 1 | (0) |
- * Club domestic league appearances and goals as of 7 November 2026

Andrei Raul Bălbărău (born 7 April 2001) is a Romanian professional footballer who plays as a goalkeeper for Israeli Premier League club Bnei Sakhnin.

== Career statistics ==
=== Club ===
As of 7 November 2026

Appearances and goals by club, season and competition
| Club | Season | League | | | National cup (Note: Includes Cupa României) | | Europe | | Other | | Total | |
| Club | Season | Division | Apps | Goals | Apps | Goals | Apps | Goals | Apps | Goals | Apps | Goals |
|---|---|---|---|---|---|---|---|---|---|---|---|---|
| CSM Slatina | 2019–20 | Liga III | | | | | — | | — | | | |
| CSA Steaua București | 2020–21 | Liga III | | | | | — | | 4 (Note: Appearances in Liga III promotion play-offs) | 0 | 4 | 0 |
| CSA Steaua București | 2021–22 | Liga II | 24 | 0 | 0 | 0 | — | | — | | 24 | 0 |
| CSA Steaua București | Total | | 24 | 0 | 0 | 0 | — | | 4 | 0 | 28 | 0 |
| Debrecen | 2022–23 | Nemzeti Bajnokság I | 0 | 0 | 0 | 0 | — | | — | | 0 | 0 |
| Noah (loan) | 2022–23 | Armenian Premier League | 10 | 0 | — | | — | | — | | 10 | 0 |
| Petrolul Ploiești | 2023–24 | Liga I | 0 | 0 | — | | — | | — | | 0 | 0 |
| Petrolul Ploiești | 2024–25 | Liga I | 16 | 0 | 1 | 0 | — | | — | | 17 | 0 |
| Petrolul Ploiești | 2025–26 | Liga I | 29 | 0 | 1 | 0 | — | | — | | 30 | 0 |
| Petrolul Ploiești | Total | | 45 | 0 | 2 | 0 | — | | — | | 47 | 0 |
| Bnei Sakhnin | 2026–27 | Israeli Premier League | 10 | 0 | 0 | 0 | — | | 4 (Note: Appearances in Toto Cup) | 0 | 14 | 0 |
| Career total | | | 89 | 0 | 2 | 0 | — | | 4 | 0 | 99 | 0 |

== Honours ==
CSA Steaua București

- Liga III: 2020–21
