= Erjanik Ghubasaryan =

Armenian footballer (born 2001)

Personal information
- Full name: Erjanik Khachaturi Ghubasaryan
- Date of birth: 21 February 2001 (age 25)
- Place of birth: Hamburg, Germany
- Height: 1.85 m (6 ft 1 in)
- Positions: Defensive midfielder; centre-back

Team information
- Current team: Eintracht Norderstedt
- Number: 23

Youth career
- –2015: SC V/W Billstedt
- 2015–2016: FC St. Pauli
- 2016–2020: Hamburger SV

Senior career*
| Years | Team | Apps | (Gls) |
| 2020–2022 | Lüneburger SK Hansa | 27 | (0) |
| 2022–2023 | BKMA | 2 | (0) |
| 2023–2024 | Noah | 6 | (0) |
| 2025 | TuS Dassendorf | 13 | (2) |
| 2025–2026 | Weiche Flensburg | 18 | (0) |
| 2026– | Eintracht Norderstedt | 8 | (0) |

International career^{‡}
| 2019 | Armenia U18 | 2 | (0) |
| 2018–2019 | Armenia U19 | 12 | (0) |
| 2019–2022 | Armenia U21 | 11 | (0) |
| 2023– | Armenia | 1 | (0) |
- * Club domestic league appearances and goals as of 22 September 2026 ‡ National team caps and goals as of 28 March 2023

Erjanik Khachaturi Ghubasaryan (Armenian: Երջանիկ Խաչատուրի Ղուբասարյան; born 21 February 2001) is a professional footballer who plays as a defensive midfielder or centre-back for Regionalliga Nord club Eintracht Norderstedt and the Armenia national team.

== Club career ==
Ghubasaryan is a German football graduate, has previously played for the Hamburger SV U17/U19 and FC St. Pauli II. He joined HSV after playing for the Youth academy of St Pauli. He eventually started training with the senior team. He was seen as a prospect at HSV.

In October 2020, he signed with LSK Hansa as a free agent.

On 30 July 2022, it was announced that Ghubasaryan is moving to the Armenian Premier League and signing a contract with BKMA.

On 18 January 2023, Noah announced the signing of a contract with Ghubasaryan.

Due to health issues and lack of playing time at Noah, he left the club in the summer of 2024. That same year, he returned to his native Germany, first playing for amateur club SC Wentorf before signing a professional contract with TuS Dassendorf in January 2025.

On 24 June 2025, Ghubasaryan had joined Weiche Flensburg.

== International career ==
Born and raised in Germany, in 2016, Ghubasaryan was involved several times in the Germany under-15 team to participate in the U-16 States Cup, but chose to represent Armenia from the youth teams.

He represented Armenia at the 2019 UEFA European Under-19 Championship.

On 17 March 2023, he received his first call-up to the Armenian senior national team for a UEFA Euro 2024 qualifying match against Turkey and a friendly match against Cyprus, respectively.

Ghubasaryan debuted for the senior Armenia national football team in a friendly 2–2 draw with Cyprus on 28 March 2023, he played the full game.

== Personal life ==
His older brother, Andranik, is also a footballer and former player of the Armenian national under-19 team.

== Career statistics ==
As of match played 28 March 2023

Appearances and goals by national team and year
| National team | Year | Apps | Goals |
|---|---|---|---|
| Armenia | 2023 | 1 | 0 |
| Total | | 1 | 0 |
