= 2019–20 Lori FC season =

Lori
2019–20 season
- Chairman: Tovmas Grigoryan
- Manager: David Campaña (until 2 June); Armen Sanamyan (Caretaker) (from 2 June)
- Stadium: Vanadzor Football Academy
- Premier League: 5th
- Armenian Cup: Quarterfinal vs Urartu
- Top goalscorer: League: Jonel Désiré (12); All: Jonel Désiré (12)

The 2019–20 season was Lori FC's second season in the Armenian Premier League, and they will also participate in the Armenian Cup. They finished the season in 5th position and reached the Quarterfinals of the Armenian Cup where they were knocked out by Urartu.

== Season events ==
On 18 June 2019, David Campaña was appointed as the new manager of Lori on a contract until the summer of 2020.

On 5 July, Artyom Khachaturov signed a new one-year contract with Lori, leaving the club by mutual consent on 9 December.

On 12 March 2020, the Football Federation of Armenia announced that all Armenian Premier League games had been postponed until 23 March due to the COVID-19 pandemic.

On 2 June 2020, Lori announced that manager David Campaña and his assistants Francisco Compan, Jorge Gomez, Agustin Perez and Enrique Gil had all left the club as their contracts could not be extended due to travel restrictions in returning to Armenia due to the COVID-19 pandemic. Later the same day, Armen Sanamyan was announced as Lori's caretaker manager.

On 10 July, Lori announced that 17 of the players and staff had tested positive for COVID-19, and as a result the whole club was now isolating, as a result their lat game of the season, scheduled for 14 July against Ararat Yerevan was cancelled with the points not being awarded to either team.

== Squad ==
As of match played 7 July 2020

| Number | Name | Nationality | Position | Date of birth (age) | Signed from | Signed in | Contract ends | Apps. | Goals |
Goalkeepers
| 1 | Mickaël Meira | (Portugal) | GK | 25 January 1994 (aged 26) | Gloria Buzău | 2020 | 2020 | 5 | 0 |
| 13 | Vardan Shapperi | (Armenia) | GK | 13 March 1998 (aged 22) | Pyunik | 2019 | 2021 | 19 | 0 |
| 31 | Diego Barrios | (Spain) | GK | 30 July 1994 (aged 25) | Real Valladolid B | 2020 | 2020 | 1 | 0 |
Defenders
| 15 | Djimy Alexis | (Haiti) | DF | 8 October 1997 (aged 22) | AS Capoise | 2019 | 2021 | 23 | 0 |
| 17 | Gianni Rodríguez | (Uruguay) | DF | 7 June 1994 (aged 26) | | 2020 | 2020 | 5 | 0 |
| 18 | Vahagn Ayvazyan | (Armenia) | DF | 16 April 1992 (aged 28) | Al-Nasr | 2020 | 2020 | 0 | 0 |
| 21 | Artur Avagyan | (Armenia) | DF | 4 July 1987 (aged 33) | Banants | 2019 | 2021 | 22 | 1 |
| 24 | Alexandre Yeoule | (Ivory Coast) | DF | 23 December 1995 (aged 24) | Tataouine | 2019 | 2020 | 24 | 1 |
| 27 | Christian Jiménez | (Spain) | DF | 4 July 1996 (aged 24) | CD Alcalá | 2019 | 2021 | 16 | 0 |
| 44 | Juan Bravo | (Colombia) | DF | 1 April 1990 (aged 30) | Sportivo Barracas | 2019 | 2021 | 21 | 0 |
| 55 | Diogo Coelho | (Portugal) | DF | 8 July 1992 (aged 28) | ÍBV | 2020 | | 10 | 1 |
| 99 | Arman Mkrtchyan | (Armenia) | DF | 9 July 1999 (aged 21) | Pyunik | 2017 | | 55 | 1 |
| | Tode Đaković | (Austria) | DF | 10 January 1996 (aged 24) | Smederevo 1924 | 2020 | 2020 | 1 | 0 |
| | Luiz Matheus | (Brazil) | DF | 10 January 1993 (aged 27) | Batatais | 2019 | 2021 | 14 | 2 |
Midfielders
| 5 | Julius Ufuoma | (Nigeria) | MF | 14 February 2000 (aged 20) | P Sports Academy | 2020 | | 29 | 0 |
| 8 | Sargis Shahinyan | (Armenia) | MF | 10 September 1995 (aged 24) | Alashkert | 2020 | 2020 | 12 | 1 |
| 14 | Jose Luis Gamboa | (Colombia) | MF | 12 April 2000 (aged 20) | Boca Juniors de Cali | 2020 | 2022 | 1 | 0 |
| 19 | Ugochukwu Iwu | (Nigeria) | MF | 28 November 1999 (aged 20) | Elkanemi Academy | 2018 | | 55 | 10 |
| 23 | Davit Paremuzyan | (Armenia) | MF | 2 March 2000 (aged 20) | loan from Banants II | 2019 | 2020 | 3 | 0 |
| 28 | Ruslan Zayerko | (Russia) | MF | 27 June 1993 (aged 27) | Lida | 2019 | 2020 | 18 | 4 |
| | Yeray Jiménez | (Spain) | MF | 12 February 1995 (aged 25) | Xerez | 2020 | 2020 | 0 | 0 |
Forwards
| 4 | Anicet Oura | (Ivory Coast) | FW | 7 December 1999 (aged 20) | Africa Sports d'Abidjan | 2019 | 2021 | 10 | 0 |
| 7 | Robert Minasyan | (Armenia) | FW | 8 April 1997 (aged 23) | Pyunik | 2019 | 2020 | 15 | 2 |
| 9 | Agustín Maziero | (Argentina) | FW | 27 November 1997 (aged 22) | Rosario Central | 2020 | 2020 | 7 | 2 |
| 10 | Jonel Désiré | (Haiti) | FW | 12 February 1997 (aged 23) | Mirebalais | 2019 | 2022 | 54 | 29 |
| 11 | David Ghandilyan | (Armenia) | FW | 4 June 1993 (aged 27) | Alashkert | 2020 | | 2 | 0 |
| 16 | Xabier Auzmendi | (Spain) | FW | 1 May 1997 (aged 23) | Real Sociedad C | 2019 | 2021 | 24 | 2 |
| 29 | Mihran Manasyan | (Armenia) | FW | 13 January 1989 (aged 31) | Alashkert | 2020 | 2020 | 8 | 1 |
Away on loan
| 2 | Nana Antwi | (Ghana) | DF | 10 August 2000 (aged 19) | Accra Young Wise | 2018 | 2021 | 33 | 1 |
| 6 | Annan Mensah | (Ghana) | DF | 6 July 1996 (aged 24) | Cheetah FC | 2017 | | 48 | 5 |
| 26 | Sunday Ingbede | (Nigeria) | FW | 23 April 1998 (aged 22) | Plateau United | 2018 | | 26 | 8 |
| 30 | Enock Darko | (Ghana) | FW | 9 September 2000 (aged 19) | Golden Kick | 2019 | 2022 | 20 | 0 |
Left during the season
| 1 | Danny El-Hage | (Poland) | GK | 3 September 1994 (aged 25) | Härnösands | 2019 | 2020 | 0 | 0 |
| 3 | Pedro Morilio | (Spain) | DF | 7 September 1998 (aged 21) | CD Alcalá | 2019 | 2021 | 8 | 0 |
| 6 | Julian Mendoza | (Colombia) | MF | 11 September 1993 (aged 26) | Real Cartagena | 2019 | 2021 | 0 | 0 |
| 8 | Aram Kocharyan | (Armenia) | MF | 5 March 1996 (aged 24) | Lokomotiv Yerevan | 2019 | 2020+1 | 11 | 0 |
| 9 | Grigor Aghekyan | (Armenia) | FW | 6 April 1996 (aged 24) | Isloch | 2019 | 2020 | 9 | 3 |
| 10 | Isah Aliyu | (Nigeria) | MF | 8 August 1999 (aged 20) | Remo Stars | 2018 | | 50 | 10 |
| 11 | Alejandro Puertas | (Spain) | MF | 2 February 1999 (aged 21) | Córdoba B | 2019 | 2021 | 4 | 0 |
| 14 | Levan Macharashvili | (Georgia (country)) | MF | 24 March 1997 (aged 23) | Stumbras | 2019 | | 11 | 0 |
| 18 | Artyom Khachaturov | (Armenia) | DF | 18 June 1992 (aged 28) | Zimbru Chișinău | 2018 | 2020 | 41 | 1 |
| 19 | Nwani Ikechukwu | (Nigeria) | FW | 17 October 1998 (aged 21) | loan from Nasarawa United | 2019 | 2020 | 10 | 2 |
| 20 | Moussa Diakité | (Mali) | MF | 17 December 1998 (aged 21) | Botoșani | 2019 | 2020 | 9 | 0 |
| 22 | William Gustavo | (Brazil) | DF | 9 January 1992 (aged 28) | Nõmme Kalju | 2019 | 2021 | 0 | 0 |
| 31 | Bruno Santos | (Brazil) | GK | 6 August 1989 (aged 30) | Limianos | 2019 | 2021 | 3 | 0 |

=== Out on loan ===
Note: Flags indicate national team as defined under FIFA eligibility rules; some limited exceptions apply. Players may hold more than one non-FIFA nationality.

| No. | Pos. | Nation | Player |
|---|---|---|---|
| 2 | DF | GHA | Nana Antwi (at Lille) |
| 6 | DF | GHA | Annan Mensah (at Gandzasar Kapan) |

| No. | Pos. | Nation | Player |
|---|---|---|---|
| 26 | FW | NGR | Sunday Ingbede (at Alashkert) |
| 30 | FW | GHA | Enock Darko (at Sevan) |

== Transfers ==
=== In ===
| Date | Position | Nationality | Name | From | Fee | Ref. |
|---|---|---|---|---|---|---|
| Summer 2019 | MF | (Georgia (country)) | Levan Macharashvili | Stumbras | Undisclosed | |
| 24 June 2019 | MF | (Colombia) | Julian Anderson Mendoza Blanco | Real Cartagena | Free | |
| 25 June 2019 | DF | (Brazil) | Luiz Matheus | Batatais | Undisclosed | |
| 25 June 2019 | DF | (Brazil) | William Gustavo | Nõmme Kalju | Undisclosed | |
| 26 June 2019 | DF | (Spain) | Pedro Juan Agillar Morilio | CD Alcalá | Undisclosed | |
| 26 June 2019 | GK | (Armenia) | Vardan Shapperi | Pyunik | Undisclosed | |
| 27 June 2019 | DF | (Spain) | Christian Jiménez | CD Alcalá | Undisclosed | |
| 27 June 2019 | GK | (Poland) | Danny El-Hage | Härnösands | Undisclosed | |
| 28 June 2019 | DF | (Armenia) | Artur Avagyan | Banants | Undisclosed | |
| 28 June 2019 | MF | (Spain) | Alejandro Puertas | Córdoba B | Undisclosed | |
| 17 July 2019 | GK | (Brazil) | Bruno Santos | Limianos | Undisclosed | |
| 19 July 2019 | DF | (Colombia) | Juan Bravo | Sportivo Barracas | Undisclosed | |
| 21 July 2019 | FW | (Armenia) | Grigor Aghekyan | Isloch | Undisclosed | |
| 1 August 2019 | FW | (Armenia) | Robert Minasyan | Pyunik | Undisclosed | |
| 4 August 2019 | MF | (Russia) | Ruslan Zayerko | Lida | Undisclosed | |
| 7 August 2019 | FW | (Spain) | Xabier Auzmendi | Real Sociedad C | Undisclosed | |
| 28 August 2019 | FW | (Ivory Coast) | Anicet Oura | Africa Sports d'Abidjan | Undisclosed | |
| 31 August 2019 | FW | (Haiti) | Jonel Désiré | AS Mirebalais | $60,000 | |
| 31 August 2019 | DF | (Haiti) | Djimy Alexis | AS Capoise | Undisclosed | |
| 10 September 2019 | MF | (Mali) | Moussa Diakité | Botoșani | Undisclosed | |
| 10 September 2019 | DF | (Ivory Coast) | Alexandre Yeoule | Tataouine | Undisclosed | |
| 1 January 2020 | MF | (Nigeria) | Julius Ufuoma | P Sports Academy | Undisclosed | |
| 7 February 2020 | GK | (Portugal) | Mickaël Meira | Gloria Buzău | Undisclosed | |
| 7 February 2020 | GK | (Spain) | Diego Barrios | Real Valladolid B | Undisclosed | |
| 8 February 2020 | MF | (Armenia) | Sargis Shahinyan | Alashkert | Undisclosed | |
| 8 February 2020 | FW | (Argentina) | Agustín Maziero | Rosario Central | Undisclosed | |
| 9 February 2020 | FW | (Armenia) | David Ghandilyan | Alashkert | Undisclosed | |
| 9 February 2020 | DF | (Austria) | Tode Đaković | Smederevo 1924 | Undisclosed | |
| 10 February 2020 | DF | (Armenia) | Vahagn Ayvazyan | Al-Nasr | Undisclosed | |
| 10 February 2020 | MF | (Spain) | Yeray Moreno Jiménez | Xerez | Undisclosed | |
| 16 February 2020 | DF | (Uruguay) | Gianni Rodríguez | | Free | |
| 1 March 2020 | FW | (Armenia) | Mihran Manasyan | Alashkert | Free | |
| 6 March 2020 | MF | (Colombia) | Jose Luis Gamboa | Boca Juniors de Cali | Free | |
| 7 March 2020 | DF | (Portugal) | Diogo Coelho | ÍBV | Undisclosed | |

=== Loans in ===
| Date | Position | Nationality | Name | From | Date to | Ref. |
|---|---|---|---|---|---|---|
| 3 July 2018 | FW | (Haiti) | Jonel Désiré | AS Mirebalais | 18 July 2019 | |
| 28 March 2019 | MF | (Nigeria) | Julius Ufuoma | P Sports Academy | 31 December 2019 | |
| 29 March 2019 | FW | (Nigeria) | Nwani Ikechukwu | Nasarawa United | 18 January 2020 | |
| 29 July 2019 | MF | (Armenia) | Davit Paremuzyan | Urartu II | End of Season | |

=== Out ===
| Date | Position | Nationality | Name | From | Date to | Ref. |
|---|---|---|---|---|---|---|
| Summer 2019 | GK | (Russia) | Arsen Siukayev | Tom Tomsk | Undisclosed | |
| 2 September 2019 | MF | (Nigeria) | Isah Aliyu | UD Almería | €140,000 | |
| 4 September 2019 | DF | (Brazil) | William Gustavo | Yerevan | Undisclosed | |
| 22 December 2019 | FW | (Armenia) | Grigor Aghekyan | Gandzasar Kapan | Undisclosed | |

=== Loans out ===
| Date | Position | Nationality | Name | From | Date to | Ref. |
|---|---|---|---|---|---|---|
| 24 August 2019 | DF | (Ghana) | Annan Mensah | Gandzasar Kapan | End of Season | |
| 29 August 2019 | DF | (Ghana) | Nana Antwi | Lille | End of Season | |
| 29 August 2019 | MF | (Nigeria) | Ugochukwu Iwu | Pyunik | 31 May 2020 | |
| 22 January 2020 | FW | (Nigeria) | Sunday Ingbede | Alashkert | 31 December 2020 | |
| 20 February 2020 | FW | (Ivory Coast) | Anicet Oura | Urmia Masis | End of Season | |
| 29 February 2020 | FW | (Ghana) | Enock Darko | Sevan | 30 June 2020 | |

=== Released ===
| Date | Position | Nationality | Name | Joined | Date | Ref |
|---|---|---|---|---|---|---|
| 9 December 2019 | DF | (Armenia) | Artyom Khachaturov | Florești | | |
| 16 December 2019 | MF | (Mali) | Moussa Diakité | Djoliba | 11 February 2020 | |
| 1 January 2020 | GK | (Brazil) | Bruno Santos | | | |
| 9 January 2020 | MF | (Georgia (country)) | Levan Macharashvili | Saburtalo Tbilisi | 4 February 2020 | |
| 27 January 2020 | MF | (Spain) | Alejandro Puertas | CD Teruel | 1 July 2020 | |
| 20 February 2020 | GK | (Poland) | Danny El-Hage | Leiknir F. | | |
| 1 February 2020 | DF | (Spain) | Pedro Juan Agillar Morilio | Castilleja | | |
| 25 February 2020 | MF | (Armenia) | Aram Kocharyan | Gandzasar Kapan | | |
| 28 February 2020 | MF | (Colombia) | Julian Mendoza | | | |
| 10 March 2020 | DF | (Armenia) | Vahagn Ayvazyan | Urartu | | |
| 30 June 2020 | DF | (Portugal) | Diogo Coelho | Gandzasar Kapan | 21 July 2020 | |
| 30 June 2020 | MF | (Ghana) | Annan Mensah | Urartu | 29 July 2020 | |
| 30 June 2020 | GK | (Portugal) | Mickaël Meira | Amora | | |
| 30 June 2020 | GK | (Spain) | Diego Barrios | Real Jaén | | |
| 30 June 2020 | DF | (Armenia) | Arman Mkrtchyan | Noah | 17 July 2020 | |
| 30 June 2020 | DF | (Austria) | Tode Đaković | | | |
| 30 June 2020 | DF | (Ivory Coast) | Alexandre Yeoule | Pyunik | 1 August 2020 | |
| 30 June 2020 | DF | (Uruguay) | Gianni Rodríguez | CD El Ejido | 25 September 2020 | |
| 30 June 2020 | MF | (Russia) | Ruslan Zayerko | Sokol Saratov | | |
| 30 June 2020 | MF | (Spain) | Yeray Jiménez | | | |
| 30 June 2020 | FW | (Argentina) | Agustín Maziero | Sahab SC | | |
| 30 June 2020 | FW | (Armenia) | Mihran Manasyan | Van | 5 August 2020 | |
| 30 June 2020 | FW | (Spain) | Xabier Auzmendi | Sestao River | 1 November 2020 | |

== Friendlies ==
| 3 February 2020 | Lori | 3 – 1 | Lokomotiv Yerevan | Vanadzor |
| 14:00 (UTC+4) | R.Minasyan | Report | Goal | Stadium: Vanadzor Football Academy |

| 8 February 2020 | Lori (Armenia) | 3 – 1 | (Romania) Pandurii Târgu Jiu | Belek, Turkey |
| (UTC+4) | Maziero | Report | Goal |

| 11 February 2020 | Lori (Armenia) | 1 – 1 | (Ukraine) Lviv | Belek, Turkey |
| 16:00 (UTC+4) | J.Bravo (2nd half) | Report | (1st half) |

| 14 February 2020 | Lori (Armenia) | 0 – 1 | (Russia) Lokomotiv-2 Moscow | Belek, Turkey |
| 17:00 (UTC+4) | | Report | Goal |

| 16 February 2020 | Lori (Armenia) | 1 – 0 | (Denmark) Fremad Amager | Belek, Turkey |
| (UTC+4) | Désiré | Report |

| 18 May 2020 | Lori | – | Masis | Vanadzor |
| 15:00 (UTC+4) | | | | Stadium: Vanadzor Football Academy; Attendance: 0 |

== Competitions ==
=== Premier League ===
==== Regular season ====
===== Results summary =====
| Overall | | | | | | | | Home | | | | | | Away | | | | | |
| Pld | W | D | L | GF | GA | GD | Pts | W | D | L | GF | GA | GD | W | D | L | GF | GA | GD |
|---|---|---|---|---|---|---|---|---|---|---|---|---|---|---|---|---|---|---|---|
| 18 | 9 | 5 | 4 | 28 | 20 | +8 | 32 | 6 | 2 | 1 | 20 | 9 | +11 | 3 | 3 | 3 | 8 | 11 | −3 |

Last updated: 23 May 2020.
Source: See Results

===== Results =====
| 11 August 2019 2 | Lori | 2 – 1 | Alashkert | Vanadzor |
| 17:00 (UTC+4) | J.Bravo (yellow card) 7'; Luiz Matheus (yellow card) 13'; Aghekyan 26', 61'; J.Ufuoma (yellow card) 38'; A.Avagyan (yellow card) 62'; X.Auzmendi (yellow card) 76'; Zayerko (yellow card) 90+3' | Report | Ishkhanyan (yellow card) 24'; S.Shahinyan 29'; Kadymyan (yellow card) 90+4' | Stadium: Vanadzor Football Academy; Attendance: 500; Referee: Gevorg Eghoyan |

| 17 August 2019 3 | Gandzasar Kapan | 1 – 1 | Lori | Yerevan |
| 19:00 (UTC+4) | E.Yeghiazaryan 57' | Report | J.Bravo (yellow card) 23'; X.Auzmendi 29' | Stadium: Yerevan Football Academy Stadium; Attendance: 150; Referee: Artur Safaryan |
Note: Gandzasar Kapan played their home games at the Yerevan Football Academy Stadium, Yerevan, instead of their regular stadium Gandzasar Stadium, Kapan.

| 24 August 2019 4 | Lori | 1 – 0 | Noah | Vanadzor |
| 17:00 (UTC+4) | Aghekyan 10'; W.Nwani (yellow card) 64'; V.Shapperi (yellow card) 90+2'; A.Mkrtchyan (yellow card) 90+3' | Report | V.Avetisyan (yellow card) 30'; V.Movsisyan (yellow card) 51'; B.Hovhannisyan (yellow card) 69' | Stadium: Vanadzor Football Academy; Attendance: 550; Referee: Suren Baliyan |

| 13 September 2019 6 | Yerevan | 0 – 1 | Lori | Vanadzor |
| 16:00 (UTC+4) | Lynko (yellow card) 67'; D.Klimakov (yellow card) 81'; Y.Yevgenyev (yellow card) 87'; Ar.Petrosyan (yellow card) 90+6' | Report | A.Avagyan 90+3'; L.Macharashvili (yellow card) 90+3'; Désiré (yellow card) 90+6' | Stadium: Vanadzor City Stadium; Attendance: 500; Referee: Zaven Hovhannisyan |

| 17 September 2019 7 | Lori | 2 – 1 | Urartu | Vanadzor |
| 16:00 (UTC+4) | Zayerko 16'; J.Ufuoma (yellow card) 30'; X.Auzmendi 37' | Report | Kobzar 8'; Nikolić (yellow card) 14'; P.Mutumosi (yellow card) 49'; Darbinyan (yellow card) 90+3' | Stadium: Vanadzor Football Academy; Attendance: 300; Referee: Edgar Sahakyan |

| 22 September 2019 8 | Lori | 1 – 4 | Ararat Yerevan | Vanadzor |
| 16:00 (UTC+4) | Oura (yellow card) 74'; A.Yeoule 85' | Report | Davidyan 9'; Aleksanyan (yellow card) 40'; Arshakyan 55'; Kozlov 66' (yellow card) 71'; Morozov (yellow card) 76'; Welsen Junior 88' | Stadium: Vanadzor Football Academy; Attendance: 550; Referee: Henrik Nalbandyan |

| 26 September 2019 1 | Pyunik | 3 – 1 | Lori | Yerevan |
| 19:30 (UTC+4) | Nirisarike 11'; Miranyan 68'; Alfred 75' | Report | Luiz Matheus (yellow card) 61'; Désiré 81' | Stadium: Vazgen Sargsyan Republican Stadium; Attendance: 500; Referee: Suren Baliyan |
Note: Match originally scheduled for 4 August 2019.

| 30 September 2019 9 | Lori | 0 – 0 | Shirak | Vanadzor |
| 16:00 (UTC+4) | J.Bravo (yellow card) 57'; A.Avagyan (yellow card) 89'; R.Minasyan (yellow card) 90+1' | Report | A.Davoyan (yellow card) 50' | Stadium: Vanadzor Football Academy; Attendance: 450; Referee: Artur afaryan |

| 5 October 2019 10 | Lori | 2 – 2 | Pyunik | Vanadzor |
| 19:30 (UTC+4) | Désiré 30' (pen.), 61' (pen.); Zayerko (yellow card) 44'; X.Auzmendi (yellow card) 69' | Report | Yedigaryan (yellow card) 14' (goal) 35' (pen.); Mahmudov (yellow card) 25'; Simonyan (yellow card) 40'; Vardanyan (yellow card) 57'; Miranyan 78' | Stadium: Vanadzor Football Academy; Attendance: 1,000; Referee: Ashot Ghaltakchyan |

| 20 October 2019 11 | Alashkert | 0 – 1 | Lori | Yerevan |
| 15:00 (UTC+4) | Avahimyan (yellow card) 25'; Baranov (yellow card) 53'; Čančarević (yellow card) 60'; V.Hayrapetyan (yellow card) 88' | Report | J.Ufuoma (yellow card) 16'; E.Darko (yellow card) 19'; Désiré 55' (pen.); L.Macharashvili (yellow card) 58'; Auzmendi (yellow card) 70' | Stadium: Alashkert Stadium; Attendance: 300; Referee: Edgar Sahakyan |

| 26 October 2019 12 | Lori | 2 – 1 | Gandzasar Kapan | Vanadzor |
| 15:00 (UTC+4) | Zayerko 18'; Désiré 66' (pen.) (yellow card) 90+5'; L.Macharashvili (yellow card) 80'; A.Avagyan (yellow card) 90+1' | Report | Ar.Hovhannisyan 24' (yellow card) 75'; D.Minasyan (yellow card) 83' | Stadium: Vanadzor Football Academy; Attendance: 400; Referee: Suren Baliyan |

| 6 November 2019 5 | Ararat-Armenia | 0 – 0 | Lori | Yerevan |
| 16:00 (UTC+4) | Sanogo (yellow card) 8'; Ângelo (yellow card) 48'; Guz (yellow card) 59' (yellow-red card) 73' | Report | J.Ufuoma (yellow card) 34' (yellow-red card) 77'; X.Auzmendi (yellow card) 80' | Stadium: Yerevan Football Academy Stadium; Attendance: 300; Referee: Gevorg Eghoyan |
Note: Match originally scheduled for 30 August 2019.

| 10 November 2019 13 | Noah | 3 – 1 | Lori | Yerevan |
| 14:00 (UTC+4) | Kovalenko (yellow card) 24' (goal) 45+3'; Mayrovich 56'; Azarov 60' (pen.); B.Hovhannisyan (yellow card) 66'; A.Meliksetyan (yellow card) 66'; Mikhaylov (yellow card) 90+2' | Report | Diakité (yellow card) 23'; R.Minasyan (yellow card) 48'; V.Shapperi (yellow card) 59'; Zayerko 63'; Khachaturov (yellow card) 66'; Alexis (yellow card) 69'; Luiz Matheus (yellow card) 90+2' | Stadium: Alashkert Stadium; Attendance: 150; Referee: Henrik Nalbandyan |
Note: Match played at the Alashkert Stadium in Yerevan, instead of Noah's regular Mika Stadium in Yerevan.

| 23 November 2019 14 | Lori | 2 – 0 | Ararat-Armenia | Vanadzor |
| 14:00 (UTC+4) | Zayerko 11'; Diakité (yellow card) 34'; Alexis (yellow card) 45+2'; Luiz Matheus 68' | Report | Kódjo (yellow card) 32'; Malakyan (yellow card) 45+2'; Avetisyan (yellow card) 56'; Sanogo (yellow card) 86' | Stadium: Vanadzor Football Academy; Attendance: 165; Referee: Zaven Hovhannisyan |

| 1 December 2019 15 | Lori | 8 – 0 | Yerevan | Vanadzor |
| 14:30 (UTC+4) | R.Minasyan (yellow card) 13' (goal) 52', 75'; Désiré 32', 59', 61' (pen.), 64', 90+1'; Luiz Matheus 42' (yellow card) 56' | Report | | Stadium: Vanadzor Football Academy; Attendance: 100; Referee: Artush Kerobyan |

| 2 March 2020 16 | Urartu | 2 – 0 | Lori | Yerevan |
| 17:00 (UTC+4) | Kobzar 12'; H. Hakobyan (yellow card) 24' (yellow-red card) 90+3'; A.Ayvazov (yellow card) 33'; Paderin 45'; Sinyavsky (yellow card) 47' | Report | Désiré (yellow card) 39'; Alexis (yellow card) 47'; J.Ufuoma (yellow card) 88' | Stadium: Urartu Stadium; Attendance: 300; Referee: Artur Safaryan |

| 8 March 2020 17 | Ararat Yerevan | 0 – 0 | Lori | Gyumri |
| 14:45 (UTC+4) | Phibel (red card) 23'; Khurtsidze (yellow card) 33'; Spychka (yellow card) 57'; Welsen Junior (yellow card) 84' | Report | J.Ufuoma (yellow card) 15'; A.Avagyan (yellow card) 32' (yellow-red card) 33'; A.Yeoule (yellow card) 41'; Alexis (yellow card) 77'; C.Jiménez (yellow card) 84' | Stadium: Gyumri City Stadium; Attendance: 400; Referee: Gevorg Eghoyan |
Note: Match played at the Gyumri City Stadium in Gyumri, instead of Ararat Yerevan's regular Vazgen Sargsyan Republican Stadium in Yerevan.

| 23 May 2020 18 | Shirak | 1 – 2 | Lori | Gyumri |
| 16:30 (UTC+4) | M.Kone 72'; Miličić (yellow card) 90+1' | Report | Maziero 40' (yellow card) 86'; A.Mkrtchyan 69'; S.Shahinyan (yellow card) 86' | Stadium: Gyumri City Stadium; Attendance: 0 Referee: Zaven Hovhannisyan |
Note: Match played behind closed doors. Match was originally scheduled for 14 March, but postponed on 13 March due to the COVID-19 pandemic.

===== Table =====
| Pos | Team | Pld | W | D | L | GF | GA | GD | Pts | Qualification |
|---|---|---|---|---|---|---|---|---|---|---|
| 1 | Ararat-Armenia | 18 | 11 | 3 | 4 | 33 | 15 | +18 | 36 | Qualification for the Championship round |
| 2 | Lori | 18 | 9 | 5 | 4 | 27 | 19 | +8 | 32 | Qualification for the Championship round |
| 3 | Alashkert | 18 | 9 | 4 | 5 | 33 | 20 | +13 | 31 | Qualification for the Championship round |
| 4 | Ararat | 18 | 9 | 4 | 5 | 25 | 18 | +7 | 31 | Qualification for the Championship round |
| 5 | Noah | 18 | 9 | 3 | 6 | 25 | 19 | +6 | 30 | Qualification for the Championship round |
| 6 | Shirak | 18 | 8 | 4 | 6 | 25 | 18 | +7 | 28 | Qualification for the Championship round |
| 7 | Pyunik | 18 | 7 | 2 | 9 | 35 | 36 | −1 | 23 | Qualification for the Relegation round |
| 8 | Urartu | 18 | 6 | 5 | 7 | 22 | 24 | −2 | 23 | Qualification for the Relegation round |
| 9 | Gandzasar | 18 | 4 | 6 | 8 | 20 | 25 | −5 | 18 | Qualification for the Relegation round |
| 10 | Yerevan (R, D) | 18 | 0 | 0 | 18 | 11 | 62 | −51 | 0 | Withdrawn |

Source: Soccerway
Rules for classification: 1) Points; 2) Play-off (only if deciding champion); 3) Matches won; 4) Head-to-head points; 5) Head-to-head matches won; 6) Head-to-head goal difference; 7) Head-to-head goals scored; 8) Head-to-head away goals scored; 9) Goal difference; 10) Goals scored.
(D) Disqualified; (R) Relegated

==== Championship round ====
===== Results summary =====
| Overall | | | | | | | | Home | | | | | | Away | | | | | |
| Pld | W | D | L | GF | GA | GD | Pts | W | D | L | GF | GA | GD | W | D | L | GF | GA | GD |
|---|---|---|---|---|---|---|---|---|---|---|---|---|---|---|---|---|---|---|---|
| 9 | 1 | 5 | 3 | 8 | 14 | −6 | 8 | 1 | 2 | 1 | 5 | 6 | −1 | 0 | 3 | 2 | 3 | 8 | −5 |

Last updated: 10 July 2020.
Source: See Results

===== Results =====
| 30 May 2020 19 | Lori | 2 – 2 | Noah | Vanadzor |
| 15:45 (UTC+4) | Alexis (yellow card) 12'; Coelho 18'; J.Ufuoma (yellow card) 40'; Maziero 60' (yellow card) 68'; C.Jiménez (yellow card) 89' | Report | Spătaru 37' (yellow card) 41'; Kryuchkov (yellow card) 44'; Azarov 70'; Mayrovich (yellow card) 77'; Lavrishchev (yellow card) 90' | Stadium: Vanadzor Football Academy; Attendance: 0 Referee: Zaven Hovhannisyan |
Note: Match played behind closed doors due to the COVID-19 pandemic.

| 3 June 2020 20 | Ararat-Armenia | 0 – 0 | Noah | Yerevan |
| 18:30 (UTC+4) | Kódjo (yellow card); Ângelo (yellow card) 74'; Gouffran (yellow card) | Report | A.Yeoule (yellow card) 25' (yellow-red card) 60'; X.Auzmendi (yellow card) 68'; M.Manasyan (yellow card) 90+1' | Stadium: Yerevan Football Academy Stadium; Attendance: 0 Referee: Henrik Nalbandyan |
Note: Match played behind closed doors due to the COVID-19 pandemic.

| 8 June 2020 21 | Lori | 1 – 1 | Shirak | Vanadzor |
| 15:30 (UTC+4) | A.Avagyan (yellow card) 20'; J.Bravo (yellow card) 29'; S.Shahinyan 37' | Report | Manoyan (yellow card) 77'; Mkoyan (yellow card) 82'; M.Kone 88' | Stadium: Vanadzor Football Academy; Attendance: 0 Referee: Shahen Aghayan |
Note: Match played behind closed doors due to the COVID-19 pandemic.

| 12 June 2020 22 | Lori | 0 – 2 | Alashkert | Vanadzor |
| 17:00 (UTC+4) | Iwu (yellow card) 23'; J.Ufuoma (yellow card) 70' | Report | Bryan (yellow card) 18'; Marmentini 44' (pen.); Thiago Galvão 57'; Grigoryan (yellow card) 73' | Stadium: Vanadzor Football Academy; Attendance: 0 Referee: Zaven Hovhannisyan |
Note: Match played behind closed doors due to the COVID-19 pandemic.

| 16 June 2020 23 | Ararat Yerevan | 1 – 1 | Lori | Yerevan |
| 19:45 (UTC+4) | D.Davidyan (yellow card) 42'; Arziani (yellow card) 48'; Isayev (yellow card) 69'; Stepanets (yellow card) 90+5' | Report | A.Yeoule (yellow card) 29'; M.Manasyan (yellow card) 53'; Iwu 68' | Stadium: Yerevan Football Academy Stadium; Attendance: 0 Referee: Zaven Hovhannisyan |
Note: Match played behind closed doors due to the COVID-19 pandemic.

| 20 June 2020 24 | Noah | 2 – 1 | Lori | Yerevan |
| 17:30 (UTC+4) | Spătaru 34'; R.Krusnauskas 38'; Emsis (yellow card) 57'; Kovalenko (yellow card) 90+1'; Gareginyan (yellow card) 90+4' | Report | Désiré (yellow card) 30' (goal) 88'; Iwu (yellow card) 58' | Stadium: Alashkert Stadium; Attendance: 0 Referee: Shahen Aghayan |
Note: Match played behind closed doors due to the COVID-19 pandemic.

| 28 June 2020 25 | Lori | 2 – 1 | Ararat-Armenia | Vanadzor |
| 17:30 (UTC+4) | Alexis (yellow card) 42'; Désiré 72' (pen.); A.Yeoule (yellow card) 87'; Oura (yellow card) 89'; M.Manasyan 90+5' | Report | Alexis 14' (o.g.); Damčevski (yellow card) 56' (yellow-red card) 62' | Stadium: Vanadzor Football Academy; Attendance: 0 |
Note: Match played behind closed doors due to the COVID-19 pandemic.

| 2 July 2020 26 | Shirak | 0 – 0 | Lori | Gyumri |
| 17:30 (UTC+4) | A.Aslanyan (yellow card) 71'; L.Mryan (yellow card) 90+3' | Report | A.Yeoule (yellow card) 86' | Stadium: Gyumri City Stadium; Attendance: 0 Referee: Shahen Aghayan |
Note: Match played behind closed doors due to the COVID-19 pandemic.

| 7 July 2020 27 | Alashkert | 5 – 1 | Lori | Yerevan |
| 18:00 (UTC+4) | Thiago Galvão 10'; Camara 48'; Glišić 49', 69'; Tiago Cametá (yellow card) 56'; Voskanyan (yellow card) 63'; E.Avagyan 90+2' | Report | Iwu 4'; Alexis (yellow card) 41'; Désiré (yellow card) 63'; J.Bravo (yellow card) 90+2' | Stadium: Alashkert Stadium; Attendance: 0 Referee: Shahen Aghayan |
Note: Match played behind closed doors due to the COVID-19 pandemic.

| 14 July 2020 28 | Lori | v | Ararat Yerevan | Vanadzor |
| 17:30 (UTC+4) | | | | Stadium: Vanadzor Football Academy; Attendance: 0 |
Note: Match cancelled on 10 July due to COVID-19 within the Lori squad, with the points not being awarded.

===== Table =====
| Pos | Team | Pld | W | D | L | GF | GA | GD | Pts | Qualification |
|---|---|---|---|---|---|---|---|---|---|---|
| 1 | Ararat-Armenia (C) | 28 | 15 | 7 | 6 | 45 | 23 | +22 | 52 | Qualification for the Champions League first qualifying round |
| 2 | Noah | 28 | 14 | 6 | 8 | 37 | 27 | +10 | 48 | Qualification for the Europa League first qualifying round (Note: team qualified for the Europa League first qualifying round by winning the 2019–20 Armenian Cup.) |
| 3 | Alashkert | 28 | 14 | 5 | 9 | 51 | 31 | +20 | 47 | Qualification for the Europa League first qualifying round |
| 4 | Shirak | 28 | 13 | 7 | 8 | 40 | 30 | +10 | 46 | Qualification for the Europa League first qualifying round |
| 5 | Lori | 27 | 10 | 10 | 7 | 35 | 33 | +2 | 40 | (Note: Match between Lori and Ararat Yerevan was cancelled on 10 July, with no points being awarded.) |
| 6 | Ararat | 27 | 9 | 6 | 12 | 31 | 36 | −5 | 33 | (Note: Match between Lori and Ararat Yerevan was cancelled on 10 July, with no points being awarded.) |

Source: Soccerway
Rules for classification: 1) Points; 2) Play-off (only if deciding champion); 3) Matches won; 4) Head-to-head points; 5) Head-to-head matches won; 6) Head-to-head goal difference; 7) Head-to-head goals scored; 8) Head-to-head away goals scored; 9) Goal difference; 10) Goals scored.
(C) Champions

=== Armenian Cup ===
| 1 November 2019 Second Round | Dilijan | w/o | Lori | Dilijan |
| 14:00 (UTC+4) | | Report | | Stadium: UWC Dilijan Ground |

| 27 November 2019 Quarterfinal | Lori | 0 – 1 | Urartu | Vanadzor |
| 14:30 (UTC+4) | A.Avagyan (yellow card) 7'; V.Shahatuni (yellow card) 80'; J.Ufuoma (red card) 87'; Luiz Matheus (yellow card) 90+3' | Report | Camara (yellow card) 7'; Kobzar 31' (yellow card) 84'; J.Grgec (yellow card) 80'; A.Ayvazov (yellow card) 90+3' | Stadium: Vanadzor Football Academy; Attendance: 200; Referee: Artur Safaryan |

== Statistics ==
As of match played 7 July 2020

=== Appearances and goals ===
| No. | Pos | Nat | Player | Total | | Premier League | | Armenian Cup | |
| No. | Pos | Nat | Player | Apps | Goals | Apps | Goals | Apps | Goals |
|---|---|---|---|---|---|---|---|---|---|
| 1 | GK | (Portugal) POR | Mickaël Meira | 5 | 0 | 5 | 0 | 0 | 0 |
| 4 | FW | (Ivory Coast) CIV | Anicet Oura | 10 | 0 | 5+4 | 0 | 1 | 0 |
| 5 | MF | (Nigeria) NGR | Julius Ufuoma | 23 | 0 | 22 | 0 | 1 | 0 |
| 7 | FW | (Armenia) ARM | Robert Minasyan | 15 | 2 | 2+12 | 2 | 0+1 | 0 |
| 8 | MF | (Armenia) ARM | Sargis Shahinyan | 12 | 1 | 10+2 | 1 | 0 | 0 |
| 9 | FW | (Argentina) ARG | Agustín Maziero | 7 | 2 | 5+2 | 2 | 0 | 0 |
| 10 | FW | (Haiti) HAI | Jonel Désiré | 24 | 12 | 22+1 | 12 | 1 | 0 |
| 11 | FW | (Armenia) ARM | David Ghandilyan | 2 | 0 | 0+2 | 0 | 0 | 0 |
| 13 | GK | (Armenia) ARM | Vardan Shapperi | 19 | 0 | 19 | 0 | 0 | 0 |
| 14 | MF | (Colombia) COL | Jose Luis Gamboa | 1 | 0 | 0+1 | 0 | 0 | 0 |
| 15 | DF | (Haiti) HAI | Djimy Alexis | 23 | 0 | 21+1 | 0 | 1 | 0 |
| 16 | FW | (Spain) ESP | Xabier Auzmendi | 24 | 2 | 19+4 | 2 | 1 | 0 |
| 17 | DF | (Uruguay) URU | Gianni Rodríguez | 5 | 0 | 4+1 | 0 | 0 | 0 |
| 19 | MF | (Nigeria) NGR | Ugochukwu Iwu | 7 | 2 | 7 | 2 | 0 | 0 |
| 21 | DF | (Armenia) ARM | Artur Avagyan | 22 | 1 | 17+4 | 1 | 1 | 0 |
| 23 | MF | (Armenia) ARM | Davit Paremuzyan | 3 | 0 | 0+3 | 0 | 0 | 0 |
| 24 | DF | (Ivory Coast) CIV | Alexandre Yeoule | 24 | 1 | 22+1 | 1 | 1 | 0 |
| 27 | DF | (Spain) ESP | Christian Jiménez | 16 | 0 | 14+2 | 0 | 0 | 0 |
| 28 | MF | (Russia) RUS | Ruslan Zayerko | 18 | 4 | 16+1 | 4 | 1 | 0 |
| 29 | FW | (Armenia) ARM | Mihran Manasyan | 8 | 1 | 3+5 | 1 | 0 | 0 |
| 31 | GK | (Spain) ESP | Diego Barrios | 1 | 0 | 1 | 0 | 0 | 0 |
| 44 | DF | (Colombia) COL | Juan Bravo | 21 | 0 | 19+2 | 0 | 0 | 0 |
| 55 | DF | (Portugal) POR | Diogo Coelho | 10 | 1 | 8+2 | 1 | 0 | 0 |
| 99 | DF | (Armenia) ARM | Arman Mkrtchyan | 17 | 1 | 9+8 | 1 | 0 | 0 |
| | DF | (Austria) AUT | Tode Đaković | 1 | 0 | 1 | 0 | 0 | 0 |
| | DF | (Brazil) BRA | Luiz Matheus | 14 | 2 | 13 | 2 | 1 | 0 |
Players away on loan:
| 30 | FW | (Ghana) GHA | Enock Darko | 5 | 0 | 1+3 | 0 | 1 | 0 |
Players who left Lori during the season:
| 3 | DF | (Spain) ESP | Pedro Morilio | 8 | 0 | 4+4 | 0 | 0 | 0 |
| 9 | FW | (Armenia) ARM | Grigor Aghekyan | 9 | 3 | 4+4 | 3 | 0+1 | 0 |
| 10 | MF | (Nigeria) NGR | Isah Aliyu | 3 | 0 | 1+2 | 0 | 0 | 0 |
| 11 | MF | (Spain) ESP | Alejandro Puertas | 4 | 0 | 0+4 | 0 | 0 | 0 |
| 14 | MF | (Georgia (country)) GEO | Levan Macharashvili | 11 | 0 | 9+2 | 0 | 0 | 0 |
| 18 | DF | (Armenia) ARM | Artyom Khachaturov | 3 | 0 | 3 | 0 | 0 | 0 |
| 19 | FW | (Nigeria) NGR | Nwani Ikechukwu | 4 | 0 | 1+3 | 0 | 0 | 0 |
| 20 | MF | (Mali) MLI | Moussa Diakité | 9 | 0 | 8+1 | 0 | 0 | 0 |
| 31 | GK | (Brazil) BRA | Bruno Santos | 3 | 0 | 2 | 0 | 1 | 0 |

=== Goal scorers ===
| Place | Position | Nation | Number | Name | Premier League | Armenian Cup | Total |
|---|---|---|---|---|---|---|---|
| 1 | FW | (Haiti) | 10 | Jonel Désiré | 12 | 0 | 12 |
| 2 | MF | (Russia) | 28 | Ruslan Zayerko | 4 | 0 | 4 |
| 3 | FW | (Armenia) | 9 | Grigor Aghekyan | 3 | 0 | 3 |
| 4 | FW | (Spain) | 16 | Xabier Auzmendi | 2 | 0 | 2 |
| 4 | DF | (Brazil) | 4 | Luiz Matheus | 2 | 0 | 2 |
| 4 | FW | (Armenia) | 7 | Robert Minasyan | 2 | 0 | 2 |
| 4 | FW | (Argentina) | 9 | Agustín Maziero | 2 | 0 | 2 |
| 4 | MF | (Nigeria) | 19 | Ugochukwu Iwu | 2 | 0 | 2 |
| 9 | DF | (Armenia) | 21 | Artur Avagyan | 1 | 0 | 1 |
| 9 | DF | (Ivory Coast) | 24 | Alexandre Yeoule | 1 | 0 | 1 |
| 9 | DF | (Armenia) | 99 | Arman Mkrtchyan | 1 | 0 | 1 |
| 9 | DF | (Portugal) | 92 | Diogo Coelho | 1 | 0 | 1 |
| 9 | MF | (Armenia) | 8 | Sargis Shahinyan | 1 | 0 | 1 |
| 9 | FW | (Armenia) | 29 | Mihran Manasyan | 1 | 0 | 1 |
| | | | | TOTALS | 35 | 0 | 35 |

=== Clean sheets ===
| Place | Position | Nation | Number | Name | Premier League | Armenian Cup | Total |
|---|---|---|---|---|---|---|---|
| 1 | GK | (Armenia) | 13 | Vardan Shapperi | 7 | 0 | 7 |
| 2 | GK | (Brazil) | 31 | Bruno Santos | 1 | 0 | 1 |
| 2 | GK | (Spain) | 31 | Diego Barrios | 1 | 0 | 1 |
| 2 | GK | (Portugal) | 1 | Mickaël Meira | 1 | 0 | 1 |
| | | | | TOTALS | 10 | 0 | 10 |

=== Disciplinary record ===
| Number | Nation | Position | Name | Premier League | | Armenian Cup | | Total | |
| Number | Nation | Position | Name | Yellow card | Red card | Yellow card | Red card | Yellow card | Red card |
| 4 | (Ivory Coast) | FW | Anicet Oura | 2 | 0 | 0 | 0 | 2 | 0 |
| 5 | (Nigeria) | MF | Julius Ufuoma | 9 | 1 | 0 | 1 | 9 | 2 |
| 7 | (Armenia) | FW | Robert Minasyan | 3 | 0 | 0 | 0 | 3 | 0 |
| 8 | (Armenia) | MF | Sargis Shahinyan | 1 | 0 | 0 | 0 | 1 | 0 |
| 9 | (Armenia) | FW | Agustín Maziero | 2 | 0 | 0 | 0 | 2 | 0 |
| 10 | (Haiti) | FW | Jonel Désiré | 5 | 0 | 0 | 0 | 5 | 0 |
| 13 | (Armenia) | GK | Vardan Shapperi | 2 | 0 | 1 | 0 | 3 | 0 |
| 15 | (Haiti) | DF | Djimy Alexis | 7 | 0 | 0 | 0 | 7 | 0 |
| 16 | (Spain) | FW | Xabier Auzmendi | 5 | 0 | 0 | 0 | 5 | 0 |
| 19 | (Nigeria) | MF | Ugochukwu Iwu | 2 | 0 | 0 | 0 | 2 | 0 |
| 21 | (Armenia) | DF | Artur Avagyan | 6 | 1 | 1 | 0 | 7 | 1 |
| 24 | (Ivory Coast) | DF | Alexandre Yeoule | 6 | 1 | 0 | 0 | 6 | 1 |
| 27 | (Spain) | DF | Christian Jiménez | 2 | 0 | 0 | 0 | 2 | 0 |
| 28 | (Russia) | MF | Ruslan Zayerko | 2 | 0 | 0 | 0 | 2 | 0 |
| 29 | (Armenia) | FW | Mihran Manasyan | 2 | 0 | 0 | 0 | 2 | 0 |
| 44 | (Colombia) | DF | Juan Bravo | 5 | 0 | 0 | 0 | 5 | 0 |
| 99 | (Armenia) | DF | Arman Mkrtchyan | 1 | 0 | 0 | 0 | 1 | 0 |
| | (Brazil) | DF | Luiz Matheus | 4 | 0 | 1 | 0 | 5 | 0 |
Players away on loan:
| 30 | (Ghana) | FW | Enock Darko | 1 | 0 | 0 | 0 | 1 | 0 |
Players who left Lori during the season:
| 14 | (Georgia (country)) | MF | Levan Macharashvili | 3 | 0 | 0 | 0 | 3 | 0 |
| 18 | (Armenia) | DF | Artyom Khachaturov | 1 | 0 | 0 | 0 | 1 | 0 |
| 19 | (Nigeria) | FW | Nwani Ikechukwu | 1 | 0 | 0 | 0 | 1 | 0 |
| 20 | (Mali) | MF | Moussa Diakité | 2 | 0 | 0 | 0 | 2 | 0 |
| | | | TOTALS | 74 | 3 | 3 | 1 | 77 | 4 |
