= 2019–20 FC Noah season =

Noah
2019–20 season
- CEO: Artur Sahakyan
- Manager: Vadim Boreț
- Stadium: Alashkert Stadium
- Premier League: 2nd
- Armenian Cup: Winners
- Top goalscorer: League: Maksim Mayrovich (11); All: Maksim Mayrovich (15)
| Home colours | Away colours |

The 2019–20 season was a FC Noah's 2nd season in Armenian Premier League, and first since they changed their name from Artsakh FC. They finished the season in 2nd place, behind Ararat-Armenia who they beat in the Armenian Cup final, earning qualification to the UEFA Europa League for the first time.

== Season events ==
On 5 December 2019, Benik Hovhannisyan extended his contract with FC Noah.

On 12 March 2020, the Football Federation of Armenia announced that all Armenian Premier League games had been postponed until 23 March, and that the Armenian Cup Semifinal second legs had also been postponed due to the COVID-19 pandemic.

== Squad ==
As of match played 14 July 2020

| Number | Name | Nationality | Position | Date of birth (age) | Signed from | Signed in | Contract ends | Apps. | Goals |
Goalkeepers
| 28 | Artem Delinyan | (Russia) | GK | 28 June 2000 (aged 20) | Khimki | 2020 | | 0 | 0 |
| 37 | Maksim Shvagirev | (Russia) | GK | 12 August 1994 (aged 25) | Ararat Moscow | 2019 | | 6 | 0 |
| 77 | Valerio Vimercati | (Italy) | GK | 4 March 1995 (aged 25) | União de Leiria | 2019 | | 23 | 0 |
Defenders
| 2 | Vitali Zaprudskikh | (Russia) | DF | 1 January 1991 (aged 29) | Zorky Krasnogorsk | 2019 | | 12 | 0 |
| 3 | Alan Tatayev | (Russia) | DF | 3 August 1995 (aged 24) | Unattached | 2019 | | 39 | 1 |
| 5 | Vladislav Kryuchkov | (Russia) | DF | 24 August 1989 (aged 30) | Baltika Kaliningrad | 2019 | | 27 | 1 |
| 6 | Soslan Kagermazov | (Russia) | DF | 20 August 1996 (aged 23) | Fakel Voronezh | 2019 | | 26 | 0 |
| 14 | Mikhail Kovalenko | (Russia) | DF | 25 January 1995 (aged 25) | Tyumen | 2019 | | 22 | 2 |
| 20 | Edgar Grigoryan | (Armenia) | DF | 25 August 1998 (aged 21) | on loan from Urartu | 2019 | 2020 | 8 | 0 |
| 22 | Vardan Movsisyan | (Armenia) | DF | 18 August 1991 (aged 28) | Lori | 2019 | | 22 | 0 |
| 33 | Hovhannes Nazaryan | (Armenia) | DF | 11 March 1998 (aged 22) | Pyunik | 2018 | | 32 | 0 |
| 92 | Saná Gomes | (Guinea-Bissau) | DF | 10 October 1999 (aged 20) | Sertanense | 2020 | | 2 | 0 |
Midfielders
| 7 | Eduards Emsis | (Latvia) | MF | 23 February 1996 (aged 24) | Jelgava | 2020 | | 16 | 0 |
| 8 | Yuri Gareginyan | (Armenia) | MF | 3 February 1994 (aged 26) | Ararat Yerevan | 2018 | | 49 | 3 |
| 9 | Vladimir Azarov | (Russia) | MF | 23 February 1996 (aged 24) | Sibir Novosibirsk | 2019 | | 30 | 10 |
| 10 | Benik Hovhannisyan | (Armenia) | MF | 1 May 1993 (aged 27) | Alashkert | 2019 | | 34 | 1 |
| 16 | Helistano Manga | (Guinea-Bissau) | MF | 20 May 1999 (aged 21) | União de Leiria | 2020 | | 15 | 0 |
| 24 | Sergey Dmitriev | (Russia) | MF | 14 February 1997 (aged 23) | Borges Blanques | 2019 | | 14 | 0 |
| 57 | Pavel Deobald | (Russia) | MF | 25 June 1990 (aged 30) | Shinnik Yaroslavl | 2019 | | 24 | 2 |
| 88 | Sergey Mikhailov | (Russia) | MF | 3 April 1998 (aged 22) | Rotor-2 Volgograd | 2019 | | 8 | 0 |
| 94 | Dan Spătaru | (Moldova) | MF | 24 May 1994 (aged 26) | Liepāja | 2020 | | 16 | 4 |
| 97 | Kirill Bor | (Russia) | MF | 9 November 1998 (aged 21) | Ararat Moscow | 2019 | | 25 | 3 |
| 99 | Aram Yeganyan | (Armenia) | MF | 21 August 2003 (aged 16) | Academy | 2020 | | 0 | 0 |
Forwards
| 11 | Vigen Avetisyan | (Armenia) | FW | 12 January 1993 (aged 26) | Lori | 2019 | | 22 | 2 |
| 15 | Maksim Mayrovich | (Russia) | FW | 6 February 1996 (aged 24) | KAMAZ Naberezhnye Chelny | 2019 | | 32 | 15 |
| 21 | Rokas Krusnauskas | (Lithuania) | FW | 4 November 1995 (aged 24) | Kauno Žalgiris | 2020 | | 10 | 2 |
| 31 | Dmitri Lavrishchev | (Russia) | FW | 23 December 1998 (aged 21) | Rotor Volgograd | 2019 | | 28 | 4 |
Out on loan
| 23 | Artur Stepanyan | (Armenia) | MF | 17 November 1999 (aged 20) | Ararat Yerevan | 2018 | | 4 | 0 |
| | Seyran Malkhasyan | (Armenia) | MF | 7 May 1999 (aged 21) | Lokomotiv Moscow | 2020 | | 0 | 0 |
Players who left during the season
| 7 | Karen Harutyunyan | (Armenia) | MF | 6 July 1995 (aged 25) | Banants | 2017 | | 55 | 3 |
| 12 | Arman Meliksetyan | (Armenia) | GK | 21 July 1995 (aged 24) | Ararat Yerevan | 2018 | | 26 | 0 |
| 17 | Edgar Movsesyan | (Armenia) | FW | 9 September 1998 (aged 21) | Banants | 2019 | | 13 | 1 |
| 21 | David Manoyan | (Armenia) | MF | 5 July 1990 (aged 30) | Rabotnicki | 2019 | | 12 | 2 |
| 27 | Aleksei Turik | (Russia) | MF | 25 April 1995 (aged 25) | Zenit-Izhevsk | 2019 | | 7 | 0 |

== Transfers ==
=== In ===
| Date | Position | Nationality | Name | From | Fee | Ref. |
|---|---|---|---|---|---|---|
| Summer 2019 | GK | (Italy) | Valerio Vimercati | Leiria | Undisclosed | |
| Summer 2019 | GK | (Russia) | Maksim Shvagirev | Ararat Moscow | Undisclosed | |
| Summer 2019 | DF | (Russia) | Vitali Zaprudskikh | Zorky Krasnogorsk | Undisclosed | |
| Summer 2019 | DF | (Russia) | Vladislav Kryuchkov | Baltika Kaliningrad | Undisclosed | |
| Summer 2019 | DF | (Russia) | Soslan Kagermazov | Fakel Voronezh | Undisclosed | |
| Summer 2019 | MF | (Armenia) | David Manoyan | Rabotnički | Undisclosed | |
| Summer 2019 | MF | (Russia) | Vladimir Azarov | Sibir Novosibirsk | Undisclosed | |
| Summer 2019 | MF | (Russia) | Kirill Bor | Ararat Moscow | Undisclosed | |
| Summer 2019 | MF | (Russia) | Pavel Deobald | Shinnik Yaroslavl | Undisclosed | |
| Summer 2019 | MF | (Russia) | Mikhail Kovalenko | Tyumen | Undisclosed | |
| Summer 2019 | MF | (Russia) | Sergey Mikhaylov | Rotor Volgograd | Undisclosed | |
| Summer 2019 | FW | (Russia) | Dmitri Lavrishchev | Rotor Volgograd | Undisclosed | |
| Summer 2019 | FW | (Russia) | Maksim Mayrovich | KAMAZ | Undisclosed | |
| Summer 2019 | FW | (Russia) | Aleksei Turik | Zenit-Izhevsk | Undisclosed | |
| 17 January 2020 | MF | (Latvia) | Eduards Emsis | Jelgava | Undisclosed | |
| 17 January 2020 | FW | (Lithuania) | Rokas Krusnauskas | Kauno Žalgiris | Undisclosed | |
| 8 February 2020 | MF | (Moldova) | Dan Spătaru | Liepāja | Undisclosed | |
| 17 February 2020 | GK | (Armenia) | Artem Delinyan | Khimki | Undisclosed | |
| 17 February 2020 | MF | (Armenia) | Seyran Malkhasyan | Lokomotiv Moscow Academy | Undisclosed | |
| 27 February 2020 | MF | (Guinea-Bissau) | Helistano Manga | União de Leiria | Undisclosed | |
| 2 March 2020 | DF | (Guinea-Bissau) | Saná Gomes | Sertanense | Undisclosed | |

=== Loans in ===
| Date from | Position | Nationality | Name | From | Date to | Ref. |
|---|---|---|---|---|---|---|
| 30 July 2019 | MF | (Armenia) | Edgar Grigoryan | Urartu | End of Season | |

=== Loans out ===
| Date from | Position | Nationality | Name | To | Date to | Ref. |
|---|---|---|---|---|---|---|
| 21 January 2020 | DF | (Armenia) | Artur Stepanyan | Van | End of Season | |

=== Released ===
| Date | Position | Nationality | Name | Joined | Date | Ref. |
|---|---|---|---|---|---|---|
| Summer 2019 | GK | (Armenia) | Ashot Ayvazyan | Van | | |
| Summer 2019 | GK | (Russia) | Samur Agamagomedov | Van | | |
| Summer 2019 | GK | (Russia) | Aleksei Solosin | Masis | | |
| Summer 2019 | DF | (Armenia) | Vahagn Minasyan | | | |
| Summer 2019 | DF | (Armenia) | Argishti Petrosyan | Yerevan | | |
| Summer 2019 | MF | (Armenia) | Eduard Avagyan | Pyunik | 4 July 2019 | |
| Summer 2019 | MF | (Armenia) | Artur Grigoryan | Gandzasar Kapan | 22 June 2019 | |
| Summer 2019 | MF | (Armenia) | Emil Yeghiazaryan | Gandzasar Kapan | 25 June 2019 | |
| Summer 2019 | MF | (Ivory Coast) | Geo Danny Ekra | Tambov | 21 February 2020 | |
| Summer 2019 | MF | (Ukraine) | Dmytro Klimakov | Yerevan | | |
| Summer 2019 | FW | (Armenia) | Vigen Avetisyan | | | |
| Summer 2019 | FW | (Armenia) | Vardan Bakalyan | | | |
| Summer 2019 | FW | (Burkina Faso) | Abdoul Gafar Sirima | Armavir | | |
| Summer 2019 | FW | (Ivory Coast) | Wilfried Eza | Van | | |
| 6 December 2019 | GK | (Armenia) | Arman Meliksetyan | Gandzasar Kapan | 28 January 2020 | |
| 6 December 2019 | MF | (Armenia) | David Manoyan | Shirak | 16 January 2020 | |
| 6 December 2019 | MF | (Russia) | Aleksei Turik | Smolevichi | | |
| 3 February 2020 | FW | (Armenia) | Edgar Movsesyan | Van | | |

== Friendlies ==
| 25 January 2020 | Noah | 2 – 2 | Gandzasar Kapan | Vanadzor |
| (UTC+4) | Lavrishchev 70', 72' | Report | Pogosyan 80'; Aghekyan 90+' | Stadium: Vanadzor Football Academy |

| 31 January 2020 | Dilijan | 0 – 5 | Noah | Vanadzor |
| 14:00 (UTC+4) | | Report | S.Dmitriev 6'; Fode 43'; Deobald 58'; Mayrovich 75'; Lavrishchev 78' | Stadium: Vanadzor Football Academy |

| 4 February 2020 | Noah | 4 – 3 | BKMA Yerevan | Vanadzor |
| 12:00 (UTC+4) | K.Bor 10'; R.Krusnauskas 20'; Mayrovich 24'; Malkhasyan 80' | Report | Goal | Stadium: Vanadzor Football Academy |

| 10 February 2020 | Noah (Armenia) | 3 – 2 | (Slovenia) Mura | Belek, Turkey |
| 18:00 (UTC+4) | Lavrishchev 18'; Azarov 32'; V.Avetisyan 78' | Report | L.Bobičanec 68'; K.Cipot 75' | Stadium: Arcadia Sport Center |

| 13 February 2020 | Noah (Armenia) | 1 – 1 | (Kazakhstan) Atyrau | Belek, Turkey |
| 12:30 (UTC+4) | R.Krusnauskas 89' | Report | Amirov 84' | Stadium: Arcadia Sport Center |

| 17 February 2020 | Noah (Armenia) | 4 – 1 | (Kazakhstan) Kaisar | Belek, Turkey |
| 12:00 (UTC+4) | Deobald 18'; Kryuchkov 23'; Mayrovich 29'; R.Krusnauskas 38' | Report | Lobjanidze 53' | Stadium: Arcadia Sport Center |

| 18 February 2020 | Noah (Armenia) | 1 – 3 | (Denmark) Kolding | Belek, Turkey |
| 18:00 (UTC+4) | Lavrishchev 85' | Report | R.Nautrup 14'; D.Fazlagic 55'; Jacobsen 70' | Stadium: Arcadia Sport Center |

| 22 February 2020 | Noah (Armenia) | 1 – 2 | (Belarus) Slavia Mozyr | Belek, Turkey |
| 18:00 (UTC+4) | Lavrishchev 89' | Report | Zhuk 28'; Costrov 75' | Stadium: Arcadia Sport Center |

| 8 May 2020 | Noah | 2 – 0 | Lokomotiv Yerevan | Yerevan |
| 16:00 (UTC+4) | V.Avetisyan 83'; S.Dmitriev 85' | Report | | Stadium: Yerevan Football Academy Stadium; Attendance: 0 |

| 12 May 2020 | Noah | 1 – 2 | BKMA Yerevan | Yerevan |
| (UTC+4) | Gareginyan | Report | Goal | Stadium: Yerevan Football Academy Stadium; Attendance: 0 |

| 16 May 2020 | Noah | 1 – 1 | Pyunik | Yerevan |
| (UTC+4) | L.Vardanyan | Report | Deobald | Stadium: Yerevan Football Academy Stadium; Attendance: 0 |

== Competitions ==
=== Premier League ===
==== Regular season ====
===== Results summary =====
| Overall | | | | | | | | Home | | | | | | Away | | | | | |
| Pld | W | D | L | GF | GA | GD | Pts | W | D | L | GF | GA | GD | W | D | L | GF | GA | GD |
|---|---|---|---|---|---|---|---|---|---|---|---|---|---|---|---|---|---|---|---|
| 18 | 9 | 3 | 6 | 25 | 18 | +7 | 30 | 6 | 1 | 2 | 18 | 9 | +9 | 3 | 2 | 4 | 7 | 9 | −2 |

Last updated: 25 May 2020.
Source: See Results

===== Results =====
| 3 August 2019 1 | Gandzasar Kapan | 1 – 1 | Noah | Yerevan |
| 19:00 (UTC+4) | Ar.Hovhannisyan (yellow card) 44'; Al.Hovhannisyan (yellow card) 64'; G.Nranyan (yellow card) 78'; Wbeymar 83' | Report | Gareginyan (yellow card) 19'; Kagermazov (yellow card) 36'; Kryuchkov (yellow card) 65'; Mayrovich 70' (pen.); Mikhaylov (yellow card) 82' | Stadium: Yerevan Football Academy; Attendance: 300; Referee: Henrik Nalbandyan |
Note: Match played at the Yerevan Football Academy in Yerevan, instead of Gandzasar Kapan regular Gandzasar Stadium in Kapan.

| 9 August 2019 2 | Yerevan | 0 – 2 | Noah | Vanadzor |
| 19:30 (UTC+4) | R.Zavialov (yellow card) 61' | Report | Kagermazov (yellow card) 66'; Kryuchkov 71'; Manoyan 76' (pen.) | Stadium: Vanadzor City Stadium; Attendance: 150; Referee: Shahen Aghayan |

| 18 August 2019 3 | Noah | 1 – 2 | Ararat-Armenia | Yerevan |
| 17:15 (UTC+4) | Tatayev (yellow card) 33'; Mayrovich 82' | Report | Ambartsumyan 47'; Mailson 74'; Guz (yellow card) 82' | Stadium: Alashkert Stadium; Attendance: 400; Referee: Zaven Hovhannisyan |
Note: Match played at the Alashkert Stadium in Yerevan, instead of Noah's regular Mika Stadium in Yerevan.

| 24 August 2019 4 | Lori | 1 – 0 | Noah | Vanadzor |
| 17:00 (UTC+4) | Aghekyan 10'; W.Nwani (yellow card) 64'; V.Shapperi (yellow card) 90+2'; A.Mkrtchyan (yellow card) 90+3' | Report | V.Avetisyan (yellow card) 30'; V.Movsisyan (yellow card) 51'; Hovhannisyan (yellow card) 69' | Stadium: Vanadzor Football Academy; Attendance: 550; Referee: Suren Baliyan |

| 29 August 2019 5 | Noah | 2 – 0 | Urartu | Yerevan |
| 17:00 (UTC+4) | Manoyan 17'; Mayrovich 57' | Report | Darbinyan (yellow card) 45'; Nikolić (yellow card) 90' | Stadium: Alashkert Stadium; Attendance: 370; Referee: Artur Safaryan |
Note: Match played at the Alashkert Stadium in Yerevan, instead of Noah's regular Mika Stadium in Yerevan.

| 15 September 2019 6 | Ararat Yerevan | 1 – 0 | Noah | Yerevan |
| 16:15 (UTC+4) | Morozov (yellow card) 22'; Dedechko (yellow card) 44' (yellow-red card) 58'; Chelidze 47' (yellow card) 57'; Spychka (yellow card) 71'; Kozlov (yellow card) 90+6' | Report | K.Harutyunyan (yellow card) 72' | Stadium: Vazgen Sargsyan Republican Stadium; Attendance: 500; Referee: Artur Safaryan |

| 18 September 2019 7 | Noah | 0 – 0 | Shirak | Yerevan |
| 16:15 (UTC+4) | Deobald (yellow card) 54'; V.Vimercati (yellow card) 81' | Report | M.Kone (yellow card) 43'; Z.Margaryan (yellow card) 51'; A.Muradyan (yellow card) 55'; M.Bakayoko (yellow card) 81' | Stadium: Alashkert Stadium; Attendance: 200; Referee: Henrik Nalbandyan |
Note: Match played at the Alashkert Stadium in Yerevan, instead of Noah's regular Mika Stadium in Yerevan.

| 22 September 2019 8 | Pyunik | 1 – 2 | Noah | Yerevan |
| 17:00 (UTC+4) | Miranyan 30'; Marku (yellow card) 55' (yellow-red card) 82'; Yedigaryan (yellow card) 80' | Report | Mayrovich 27'; Lavrishchev 60'; Gareginyan (yellow card) 88'; Deobald (yellow card) 90+2' | Stadium: Vazgen Sargsyan Republican Stadium; Attendance: 300; Referee: Zaven Hovhannisyan |

| 29 September 2019 9 | Noah | 1 – 2 | Alashkert | Yerevan |
| 16:00 (UTC+4) | Zaprudskikh (yellow card) 26'; Bor 43'; Lavrishchev (yellow card) 44'; Deobald (yellow card) 58'; S.Dmitriev (yellow card) 90' | Report | Miljković (yellow card) 53'; Grigoryan (yellow card) 64'; V.Hayrapetyan 68'; Voskanyan (yellow card) 90'; Kadymyan 90+1'; Thiago Galvão (yellow card) 90+3' | Stadium: Alashkert Stadium; Attendance: 300; Referee: Zaven Hovhannisyan |
Note: Match played at the Alashkert Stadium in Yerevan, instead of Noah's regular Mika Stadium in Yerevan.

| 6 October 2019 10 | Noah | 2 – 1 | Gandzasar | Yerevan |
| 15:00 (UTC+4) | Mayrovich 15'; Zaprudskikh (yellow card) 26'; Bor 39'; Kryuchkov (yellow card) 45+1' (yellow-red card) 46'; Lavrishchev (yellow card) 59'; V.Movsisyan (yellow card) 87'; V.Vimercati (yellow card) 90+5' | Report | Pogosyan (yellow card) 54'; A.Kocharyan 78' | Stadium: Alashkert Stadium; Attendance: 500; Referee: Gevorg Eghoyan |
Note: Match played at the Alashkert Stadium in Yerevan, instead of Noah's regular Mika Stadium in Yerevan.

| 18 October 2019 11 | Noah | 3 – 1 | Yerevan | Yerevan |
| 15:00 (UTC+4) | Azarov 7', 12'; Deobald 78' | Report | A.Lokwa (yellow card) 68'; Jeferson Cruz 73' | Stadium: Alashkert Stadium; Attendance: 100; Referee: Artur Simonyan |
Note: Match played at the Alashkert Stadium in Yerevan, instead of Noah's regular Mika Stadium in Yerevan.

| 25 October 2019 12 | Ararat-Armenia | 3 – 1 | Noah | Yerevan |
| 16:00 (UTC+4) | Guz 45'; Avetisyan (yellow card) 53'; Narsingh 78'; Kobyalko 90+3' | Report | Mayrovich 80'; Bor (yellow card) 81' | Stadium: Yerevan Football Academy Stadium; Attendance: 450; Referee: Ashot Ghaltakchyan |

| 10 November 2019 13 | Noah | 3 – 1 | Lori | Yerevan |
| 14:00 (UTC+4) | Kovalenko (yellow card) 24' (goal) 45+3'; Mayrovich 56'; Azarov 60' (pen.); Hovhannisyan (yellow card) 66'; A.Meliksetyan (yellow card) 66'; Mikhaylov (yellow card) 90+2' | Report | Diakité (yellow card) 23'; R.Minasyan (yellow card) 48'; V.Shapperi (yellow card) 59'; Zayerko 63'; Khachaturov (yellow card) 66'; Alexis (yellow card) 69'; L.Matheus (yellow card) 90+2' | Stadium: Alashkert Stadium; Attendance: 150; Referee: Henrik Nalbandyan |
Note: Match played at the Alashkert Stadium in Yerevan, instead of Noah's regular Mika Stadium in Yerevan.

| 23 November 2019 14 | Urartu | 0 – 0 | Noah | Yerevan |
| 18:00 (UTC+4) | Kpodo (yellow card) 72'; Budnik (yellow card) 74'; Camara (yellow card) 90' | Report | Azarov (yellow card) 73'; Tatayev (yellow card) 90'; Kryuchkov (yellow card) 90+3' | Stadium: Urartu Stadium; Attendance: 200; Referee: Artur Safaryan |

| 2 December 2019 15 | Noah | 2 – 0 | Ararat Yerevan | Yerevan |
| 14:00 (UTC+4) | Kovalenko (yellow card) 13' (yellow-red card) 72'; K.Bor (yellow card) 26'; Mayrovich 45+3'; A.Tatayev (yellow card) 47'; Kryuchkov (yellow card) 55'; V.Vimercati (yellow card) 80'; Lavrishchev 85' | Report | Khurtsidze (yellow card) 90+4' | Stadium: Alashkert Stadium; Attendance: 120; Referee: Edgar Sahakyan |
Note: Match played at the Alashkert Stadium in Yerevan, instead of Noah's regular Mika Stadium in Yerevan.

| 29 February 2020 16 | Shirak | 3 – 0 | Noah | Gyumri |
| 14:00 (UTC+4) | K.Muradyan (yellow card) 30'; M.Kone 43', 89'; Nenadović 75' (yellow card) 76' | Report | Hovhannisyan (yellow card) 21' | Stadium: Gyumri City Stadium; Attendance: 300; Referee: Gevorg Eghoyan |

| 7 March 2020 17 | Noah | 4 – 2 | Pyunik | Yerevan |
| 14:15 (UTC+4) | Deobald 2'; Azarov 17', 84' (pen.); Manga (yellow card) 34'; A.Tatayev (yellow card) 43'; V.Vimercati (yellow card) 44'; Spătaru 61'; Kovalenko (yellow card) 75' | Report | Özbiliz 44' (pen.), 55'; Zhestokov (yellow card) 61'; Nirisarike (yellow card) 76'; Stankov (yellow card) 83'; Dragojević (yellow card) 87' | Stadium: Alashkert Stadium; Attendance: 500; Referee: Henrik Nalbandyan |
Note: Match played at the Alashkert Stadium in Yerevan, instead of Noah's regular Mika Stadium in Yerevan.

| 24 May 2020 18 | Alashkert | 0 – 1 | Noah | Yerevan |
| 17:15 (UTC+4) | Ishkhanyan (yellow card) 45'; Gome (yellow card) 85' | Report | Manga (yellow card) 25'; A.Tatayev (yellow card) 71'; Mayrovich 74' | Stadium: Alashkert Stadium; Attendance: 0 Referee: Henrik Nalbandyan |
Note: Match played behind closed doors. Match was originally scheduled for 16 March, but postponed on 13 March due to the COVID-19 pandemic.

===== Table =====
| Pos | Team | Pld | W | D | L | GF | GA | GD | Pts | Qualification |
|---|---|---|---|---|---|---|---|---|---|---|
| 1 | Ararat-Armenia | 18 | 11 | 3 | 4 | 33 | 15 | +18 | 36 | Qualification for the Championship round |
| 2 | Lori | 18 | 9 | 5 | 4 | 27 | 19 | +8 | 32 | Qualification for the Championship round |
| 3 | Alashkert | 18 | 9 | 4 | 5 | 33 | 20 | +13 | 31 | Qualification for the Championship round |
| 4 | Ararat | 18 | 9 | 4 | 5 | 25 | 18 | +7 | 31 | Qualification for the Championship round |
| 5 | Noah | 18 | 9 | 3 | 6 | 25 | 19 | +6 | 30 | Qualification for the Championship round |
| 6 | Shirak | 18 | 8 | 4 | 6 | 25 | 18 | +7 | 28 | Qualification for the Championship round |
| 7 | Pyunik | 18 | 7 | 2 | 9 | 35 | 36 | −1 | 23 | Qualification for the Relegation round |
| 8 | Urartu | 18 | 6 | 5 | 7 | 22 | 24 | −2 | 23 | Qualification for the Relegation round |
| 9 | Gandzasar | 18 | 4 | 6 | 8 | 20 | 25 | −5 | 18 | Qualification for the Relegation round |
| 10 | Yerevan (R, D) | 18 | 0 | 0 | 18 | 11 | 62 | −51 | 0 | Withdrawn |

Source: Soccerway
Rules for classification: 1) Points; 2) Play-off (only if deciding champion); 3) Matches won; 4) Head-to-head points; 5) Head-to-head matches won; 6) Head-to-head goal difference; 7) Head-to-head goals scored; 8) Head-to-head away goals scored; 9) Goal difference; 10) Goals scored.
(D) Disqualified; (R) Relegated

==== Championship round ====
===== Results summary =====
| Overall | | | | | | | | Home | | | | | | Away | | | | | |
| Pld | W | D | L | GF | GA | GD | Pts | W | D | L | GF | GA | GD | W | D | L | GF | GA | GD |
|---|---|---|---|---|---|---|---|---|---|---|---|---|---|---|---|---|---|---|---|
| 10 | 5 | 3 | 2 | 12 | 8 | +4 | 18 | 4 | 1 | 0 | 9 | 2 | +7 | 1 | 2 | 2 | 3 | 6 | −3 |

Last updated: 14 July 2020.
Source: See Results

===== Results =====
| 30 May 2020 19 | Lori | 2 – 2 | Noah | Vanadzor |
| 15:45 (UTC+4) | Alexis (yellow card) 12'; Coelho 18'; J.Ufuoma (yellow card) 40'; Maziero 60' (yellow card) 68'; C.Jiménez (yellow card) 89' | Report | Spătaru 37' (yellow card) 41'; Kryuchkov (yellow card) 44'; Azarov 70'; Mayrovich (yellow card) 77'; Lavrishchev (yellow card) 90' | Stadium: Vanadzor Football Academy; Attendance: 0 Referee: Zaven Hovhannisyan |
Note: Match played behind closed doors due to the COVID-19 pandemic.

| 4 June 2020 20 | Noah | 1 – 0 | Alashkert | Yerevan |
| 17:30 (UTC+4) | Deobald (yellow card) 58'; Kovalenko (yellow card) 62'; Manga (yellow card) 70'; K.Bor (yellow card) 72'; Emsis (yellow card) 74'; Kagermazov (yellow card) 76'; Azarov 89' | Report | Voskanyan (yellow card) 50' | Stadium: Alashkert Stadium; Attendance: 0 Referee: Shahen Aghayan |
Note: Match played behind closed doors due to the COVID-19 pandemic.

| 7 June 2020 21 | Ararat Yerevan | 0 – 0 | Noah | Yerevan |
| 19:00 (UTC+4) | Oseni (yellow card) 6'; Rafinha (yellow card) 40'; Dedechko (yellow card) 40'; James (yellow card) 63' | Report | A.Tatayev (red card) 12' | Stadium: Yerevan Football Academy Stadium; Attendance: 0 Referee: Ashot Ghaltakchyan |
Note: Match played behind closed doors due to the COVID-19 pandemic.

| 11 June 2020 22 | Shirak | 2 – 0 | Noah | Gyumri |
| 17:00 (UTC+4) | M.Kone 36'; K.Muradyan (yellow card) 59'; Udo 74'; V.Yermakov (yellow card) 90+1' | Report | Spătaru (yellow card) 43'; Kagermazov (yellow card) 49' | Stadium: Gyumri City Stadium; Attendance: 0 Referee: Henrik Nalbandyan |
Note: Match played behind closed doors due to the COVID-19 pandemic.

| 15 June 2020 23 | Noah | 1 – 1 | Ararat-Armenia | Yerevan |
| 17:30 (UTC+4) | Kovalenko 7' (yellow card) 90'; Spătaru (yellow card) 52' | Report | Vakulenko 17'; Sanogo (yellow card) 34'; Malakyan (yellow card) 37' | Stadium: Alashkert Stadium; Attendance: 0 Referee: Ashot Ghaltakchyan |
Note: Match played behind closed doors due to the COVID-19 pandemic.

| 20 June 2020 24 | Noah | 2 – 1 | Lori | Yerevan |
| 17:30 (UTC+4) | Spătaru 34'; R.Krusnauskas 38'; Emsis (yellow card) 57'; Gareginyan (yellow card) 90'; Kovalenko (yellow card) 90+1' | Report | Désiré (yellow card) 30' (goal) 88'; U.Iwu (yellow card) 58' | Stadium: Alashkert Stadium; Attendance: 0 Referee: Shahen Aghayan |
Note: Match played behind closed doors due to the COVID-19 pandemic.

| 28 June 2020 25 | Alashkert | 0 – 1 | Noah | Yerevan |
| 17:30 (UTC+4) | Miljković (yellow card) 37'; Thiago Galvão (yellow card) 88' | Report | Kryuchkov (yellow card) 77'; K.Bor 87'; Lavrishchev (yellow card) 90+3' | Stadium: Alashkert Stadium; Attendance: 0 Referee: Shahen Aghayan |
Note: Match played behind closed doors due to the COVID-19 pandemic.

| 2 July 2020 26 | Noah | 1 – 0 | Ararat Yerevan | Yerevan |
| 18:00 (UTC+4) | Manga (yellow card) 56'; Azarov 63' (yellow card) 90+3' | Report | Stepanets (yellow card) 90' | Stadium: Alashkert Stadium; Attendance: 0 Referee: Ashot Ghaltakchyan |
Note: Match played behind closed doors due to the COVID-19 pandemic.

| 6 July 2020 27 | Noah | 4 – 0 | Shirak | Yerevan |
| 18:00 (UTC+4) | Gareginyan (yellow card) 38'; Mayrovich 44', 75' (pen.); V.Vimercati (yellow card) 65'; Emsis (yellow card) 82'; Lavrishchev 86'; R.Krusnauskas 90' | Report | J.Avo (yellow card) 40'; Z.Margaryan (red card) 74'; Manoyan (yellow card) 74'; Mkoyan (red card) 79' | Stadium: Alashkert Stadium; Attendance: 0 Referee: Zaven Hovhannisyan |
Note: Match played behind closed doors due to the COVID-19 pandemic.

| 14 July 2020 28 | Ararat-Armenia | 2 – 0 | Noah | Yerevan |
| 17:30 (UTC+4) | Narsingh 16'; Otubanjo 45'; Damčevski (yellow card) 52'; A.Khachumyan (yellow card) 57' | Report | Kryuchkov (yellow card) 35'; Spătaru (yellow card) 83' | Stadium: Yerevan Football Academy Stadium; Attendance: 0 Referee: Henrik Nalbandyan |
Note: Match played behind closed doors due to the COVID-19 pandemic.

===== Table =====
| Pos | Team | Pld | W | D | L | GF | GA | GD | Pts | Qualification |
|---|---|---|---|---|---|---|---|---|---|---|
| 1 | Ararat-Armenia (C) | 28 | 15 | 7 | 6 | 45 | 23 | +22 | 52 | Qualification for the Champions League first qualifying round |
| 2 | Noah | 28 | 14 | 6 | 8 | 37 | 27 | +10 | 48 | Qualification for the Europa League first qualifying round (Note: team qualified for the Europa League first qualifying round by winning the 2019–20 Armenian Cup.) |
| 3 | Alashkert | 28 | 14 | 5 | 9 | 51 | 31 | +20 | 47 | Qualification for the Europa League first qualifying round |
| 4 | Shirak | 28 | 13 | 7 | 8 | 40 | 30 | +10 | 46 | Qualification for the Europa League first qualifying round |
| 5 | Lori | 27 | 10 | 10 | 7 | 35 | 33 | +2 | 40 | (Note: Match between Lori and Ararat Yerevan was cancelled on 10 July, with no points being awarded.) |
| 6 | Ararat | 27 | 9 | 6 | 12 | 31 | 36 | −5 | 33 | (Note: Match between Lori and Ararat Yerevan was cancelled on 10 July, with no points being awarded.) |

Source: Soccerway
Rules for classification: 1) Points; 2) Play-off (only if deciding champion); 3) Matches won; 4) Head-to-head points; 5) Head-to-head matches won; 6) Head-to-head goal difference; 7) Head-to-head goals scored; 8) Head-to-head away goals scored; 9) Goal difference; 10) Goals scored.
(C) Champions

=== Armenian Cup ===
| 3 November 2019 Second Round | Noah | 1 – 0 | Ararat Yerevan | Yerevan |
| 16:00 (UTC+4) | Mayrovich 33'; Azarov (yellow card) 63'; Zaprudskikh (yellow card) 70' | Report | Balyaikin (yellow card) 74' | Stadium: Alashkert Stadium; Attendance: 400; Referee: Shahen Aghayan |

| 27 November 2019 Quarterfinal | Van | 0 – 1 | Noah | Charentsavan |
| 14:00 (UTC+4) | S.Dzagoev (yellow card) 26'; Eza (yellow card) 37' | Report | Hovhannisyan (yellow card) 61' (goal) 70' | Stadium: Charentsavan City Stadium; Attendance: 500; Referee: Ashot Ghaltakchyan |

| 11 March 2020 Semifinal 1st leg | Urartu | 0 – 1 | Noah | Yerevan |
| 18:00 (UTC+4) | Paderin (yellow card) 45+1' | Report | S.Gomes (yellow card) 23' (yellow-red card) 87'; A.Tatayev 30'; Spătaru (yellow card) 90+2' | Stadium: Urartu Stadium; Attendance: 1,000; Referee: Ashot Ghaltakchyan |

| 24 June 2020 Semifinal 2nd leg | Noah | 2 – 1 (3 – 1 agg.) | Urartu | Yerevan |
| 17:30 (UTC+4) | Mayrovich 3' (pen.); Gareginyan (red card) 20'; Manga (yellow card) 44'; Lavrishchev 78'; V.Vimercati (yellow card) 78'; Kagermazov (yellow card) 78'; M.Shvagirev (yellow card) 82' | Report | P.Mutumosi (yellow card) 2'; Darbinyan (yellow card) 7'; Kobzar 23'; Paderin (yellow card) 79'; Ebert (yellow card) 83' | Stadium: Alashkert Stadium; Attendance: 0 Referee: Henrik Nalbandyan |
Note: Match originally scheduled to be played on 22 March, but postponed on 13 March due to the COVID-19 pandemic.

==== Final ====
| 10 July 2020 | Noah | 5 – 5 (a.e.t.) (7 – 6 p) | Ararat-Armenia | Yerevan |
| 19:00 (UTC+4) | Mayrovich 39', 60'; Kryuchkov (yellow card) 49'; Azarov 56' (pen.), 115' (pen.); Spătaru 67'; Kovalenko (yellow card) 106'; V.Movsisyan (yellow card) 113' | Report | Louis 8', 40'; A.Tatayev 23' (o.g.); Otubanjo 29', 117'; Achenteh (yellow card) 55'; Kobyalko (yellow card) 89'; Kódjo (red card) 90+3'; Čupić (yellow card) 122' | Stadium: Yerevan Football Academy Stadium; Attendance: 0 Referee: Zaven Hovhannisyan |
| | Penalties |
| | K.Bor (penalty missed); Azarov (penalty scored); V.Avetisyan (penalty missed); Gareginyan (penalty scored); S.Dmitriev (penalty scored); Kovalenko (penalty scored); E.Grigoryan (penalty scored); Kryuchkov (penalty scored); R.Krusnauskas (penalty scored) | | (penalty missed) A.Nahapetyan; (penalty scored) Kobyalko; (penalty scored) Ângelo; (penalty missed) Malakyan; (penalty scored) Otubanjo; (penalty scored) Sanogo; (penalty scored) Christian; (penalty scored) Guz; (penalty missed) Danielyan |
Note: Match played behind closed doors due to the COVID-19 pandemic.

== Statistics ==
As of match played 14 July 2020

=== Appearances and goals ===
| No. | Pos | Nat | Player | Total | | Premier League | | Armenian Cup | |
| No. | Pos | Nat | Player | Apps | Goals | Apps | Goals | Apps | Goals |
|---|---|---|---|---|---|---|---|---|---|
| 2 | DF | (Russia) RUS | Vitali Zaprudskikh | 12 | 0 | 10+1 | 0 | 1 | 0 |
| 3 | DF | (Russia) RUS | Alan Tatayev | 30 | 1 | 26 | 0 | 4 | 1 |
| 5 | DF | (Russia) RUS | Vladislav Kryuchkov | 27 | 1 | 23 | 1 | 4 | 0 |
| 6 | DF | (Russia) RUS | Soslan Kagermazov | 26 | 0 | 21+1 | 0 | 4 | 0 |
| 7 | MF | (Latvia) LVA | Eduards Emsis | 16 | 0 | 11+2 | 0 | 3 | 0 |
| 8 | MF | (Armenia) ARM | Yuri Gareginyan | 27 | 0 | 12+11 | 0 | 3+1 | 0 |
| 9 | MF | (Russia) RUS | Vladimir Azarov | 30 | 10 | 23+2 | 8 | 4+1 | 2 |
| 10 | MF | (Armenia) ARM | Benik Hovhannisyan | 21 | 1 | 11+7 | 0 | 2+1 | 1 |
| 11 | MF | (Armenia) ARM | Vigen Avetisyan | 13 | 0 | 2+8 | 0 | 1+2 | 0 |
| 14 | DF | (Russia) RUS | Mikhail Kovalenko | 22 | 2 | 17+2 | 2 | 3 | 0 |
| 15 | FW | (Russia) RUS | Maksim Mayrovich | 32 | 15 | 27 | 11 | 5 | 4 |
| 16 | MF | (Guinea-Bissau) GNB | Helistano Manga | 15 | 0 | 11+1 | 0 | 3 | 0 |
| 20 | MF | (Armenia) ARM | Edgar Grigoryan | 8 | 0 | 1+6 | 0 | 0+1 | 0 |
| 21 | FW | (Lithuania) LTU | Rokas Krusnauskas | 10 | 2 | 4+3 | 2 | 1+2 | 0 |
| 22 | DF | (Armenia) ARM | Vardan Movsisyan | 11 | 0 | 6+4 | 0 | 1 | 0 |
| 24 | MF | (Russia) RUS | Sergey Dmitriev | 14 | 0 | 2+8 | 0 | 1+3 | 0 |
| 31 | FW | (Russia) RUS | Dmitri Lavrishchev | 28 | 4 | 9+15 | 3 | 2+2 | 1 |
| 37 | GK | (Russia) RUS | Maksim Shvagirev | 6 | 0 | 2 | 0 | 4 | 0 |
| 57 | MF | (Russia) RUS | Pavel Deobald | 24 | 2 | 18+2 | 2 | 3+1 | 0 |
| 77 | GK | (Italy) ITA | Valerio Vimercati | 23 | 0 | 22 | 0 | 1 | 0 |
| 88 | MF | (Russia) RUS | Sergey Mikhaylov | 8 | 0 | 5+3 | 0 | 0 | 0 |
| 92 | DF | (Guinea-Bissau) GNB | Saná Gomes | 2 | 0 | 1 | 0 | 1 | 0 |
| 94 | MF | (Moldova) MDA | Dan Spătaru | 16 | 4 | 13 | 3 | 3 | 1 |
| 97 | MF | (Russia) RUS | Kirill Bor | 25 | 3 | 14+8 | 3 | 1+2 | 0 |
Players away on loan:
Players who left Noah during the season:
| 7 | MF | (Armenia) ARM | Karen Harutyunyan | 4 | 0 | 1+3 | 0 | 0 | 0 |
| 12 | GK | (Armenia) ARM | Arman Meliksetyan | 4 | 0 | 4 | 0 | 0 | 0 |
| 17 | FW | (Armenia) ARM | Edgar Movsesyan | 5 | 0 | 2+3 | 0 | 0 | 0 |
| 21 | MF | (Armenia) ARM | David Manoyan | 12 | 2 | 7+3 | 2 | 0+2 | 0 |
| 27 | MF | (Russia) RUS | Aleksei Turik | 7 | 0 | 3+3 | 0 | 0+1 | 0 |

=== Goal scorers ===
| Place | Position | Nation | Number | Name | Premier League | Armenian Cup | Total |
|---|---|---|---|---|---|---|---|
| 1 | FW | (Russia) | 15 | Maksim Mayrovich | 11 | 4 | 15 |
| 2 | MF | (Russia) | 9 | Vladimir Azarov | 8 | 2 | 10 |
| 3 | FW | (Russia) | 31 | Dmitri Lavrishchev | 3 | 1 | 4 |
| 3 | MF | (Moldova) | 94 | Dan Spătaru | 3 | 1 | 4 |
| 5 | MF | (Russia) | 97 | Kirill Bor | 3 | 0 | 3 |
| 6 | MF | (Armenia) | 21 | David Manoyan | 2 | 0 | 2 |
| 6 | MF | (Russia) | 57 | Pavel Deobald | 2 | 0 | 2 |
| 6 | DF | (Russia) | 14 | Mikhail Kovalenko | 2 | 0 | 2 |
| 6 | FW | (Lithuania) | 21 | Rokas Krusnauskas | 2 | 0 | 2 |
| 10 | DF | (Russia) | 5 | Vladislav Kryuchkov | 1 | 0 | 1 |
| 10 | MF | (Armenia) | 10 | Benik Hovhannisyan | 0 | 1 | 1 |
| 10 | DF | (Russia) | 3 | Alan Tatayev | 0 | 1 | 1 |
| | | | | TOTALS | 37 | 10 | 47 |

=== Clean sheets ===
| Place | Position | Nation | Number | Name | Premier League | Armenian Cup | Total |
|---|---|---|---|---|---|---|---|
| 1 | GK | (Italy) | 77 | Valerio Vimercati | 8 | 1 | 9 |
| 2 | GK | (Russia) | 37 | Maksim Shvagirev | 2 | 2 | 4 |
| 3 | GK | (Armenia) | 12 | Arman Meliksetyan | 1 | 0 | 1 |
| | | | | TOTALS | 11 | 3 | 14 |

=== Disciplinary record ===
| Number | Nation | Position | Name | Premier League | | Armenian Cup | | Total | |
| Number | Nation | Position | Name | Booked | Sent off (straight red) | Booked | Sent off (straight red) | Booked | Sent off (straight red) |
| 2 | (Russia) | DF | Vitali Zaprudskikh | 2 | 0 | 1 | 0 | 3 | 0 |
| 3 | (Russia) | DF | Alan Tatayev | 5 | 1 | 0 | 0 | 5 | 1 |
| 5 | (Russia) | DF | Vladislav Kryuchkov | 8 | 1 | 1 | 0 | 9 | 1 |
| 6 | (Russia) | DF | Soslan Kagermazov | 4 | 0 | 1 | 0 | 5 | 0 |
| 7 | (Latvia) | MF | Eduards Emsis | 3 | 0 | 0 | 0 | 3 | 0 |
| 8 | (Armenia) | MF | Yuri Gareginyan | 4 | 0 | 0 | 1 | 4 | 1 |
| 9 | (Russia) | MF | Vladimir Azarov | 2 | 0 | 1 | 0 | 3 | 0 |
| 10 | (Armenia) | MF | Benik Hovhannisyan | 3 | 0 | 1 | 0 | 4 | 0 |
| 11 | (Armenia) | MF | Vigen Avetisyan | 1 | 0 | 0 | 0 | 1 | 0 |
| 14 | (Russia) | DF | Mikhail Kovalenko | 7 | 1 | 1 | 0 | 8 | 1 |
| 15 | (Russia) | FW | Maksim Mayrovich | 1 | 0 | 0 | 0 | 1 | 0 |
| 16 | (Guinea-Bissau) | MF | Helistano Manga | 4 | 0 | 1 | 0 | 5 | 0 |
| 22 | (Armenia) | DF | Vardan Movsisyan | 2 | 0 | 1 | 0 | 3 | 0 |
| 24 | (Russia) | MF | Sergey Dmitriev | 1 | 0 | 0 | 0 | 1 | 0 |
| 31 | (Armenia) | FW | Dmitri Lavrishchev | 4 | 0 | 0 | 0 | 4 | 0 |
| 37 | (Russia) | GK | Maksim Shvagirev | 0 | 0 | 1 | 0 | 1 | 0 |
| 57 | (Russia) | MF | Pavel Deobald | 4 | 0 | 0 | 0 | 4 | 0 |
| 77 | (Italy) | GK | Valerio Vimercati | 4 | 1 | 1 | 0 | 5 | 1 |
| 88 | (Russia) | MF | Sergey Mikhaylov | 2 | 0 | 0 | 0 | 2 | 0 |
| 92 | (Guinea-Bissau) | DF | Saná Gomes | 0 | 0 | 2 | 1 | 2 | 1 |
| 94 | (Moldova) | MF | Dan Spătaru | 4 | 0 | 1 | 0 | 5 | 0 |
| 97 | (Russia) | MF | Kirill Bor | 3 | 0 | 1 | 0 | 4 | 0 |
Players who left Noah during the season:
| 7 | (Armenia) | MF | Karen Harutyunyan | 1 | 0 | 0 | 0 | 1 | 0 |
| 12 | (Armenia) | GK | Arman Meliksetyan | 1 | 0 | 0 | 0 | 1 | 0 |
| | | | TOTALS | 70 | 4 | 14 | 2 | 84 | 6 |
