= Maksim Mayrovich =

Russian footballer

Personal information
- Full name: Maksim Aleksandrovich Mayrovich
- Date of birth: 6 February 1996 (age 30)
- Place of birth: Novorossiysk, Russia
- Height: 1.83 m (6 ft 0 in)
- Position: Forward

Youth career
- 2001–2008: FC Chernomorets Novorossiysk
- 2008–2013: Chertanovo Education Center

Senior career*
| Years | Team | Apps | (Gls) |
| 2013–2017 | Kuban Krasnodar | 26 | (1) |
| 2016–2017 | → Kuban-2 Krasnodar | 22 | (2) |
| 2017 | Chertanovo Moscow | 11 | (1) |
| 2018 | Afips Afipsky | 0 | (0) |
| 2018 | Chertanovo Moscow | 15 | (2) |
| 2018 | → Chertanovo-2 Moscow | 6 | (1) |
| 2019 | KAMAZ Naberezhnye Chelny | 9 | (3) |
| 2019–2021 | Noah | 34 | (13) |
| 2021 | → Akron Tolyatti (loan) | 15 | (1) |
| 2021 | Akron Tolyatti | 6 | (0) |
| 2021–2022 | Noah | 29 | (9) |
| 2022–2023 | Urartu | 26 | (8) |
| 2023 | Chelyabinsk | 10 | (1) |
| 2024 | Telavi | 18 | (1) |

International career^{‡}
| 2011 | Russia U15 | 1 | (0) |
| 2012 | Russia U16 | 3 | (0) |
| 2012–2013 | Russia U17 | 10 | (3) |
| 2014 | Russia U18 | 2 | (0) |
| 2016 | Russia U21 | 2 | (0) |
- * Club domestic league appearances and goals as of 1 June 2024 ‡ National team caps and goals as of 29 November 2016

Maksim Aleksandrovich Mayrovich (Russian: Максим Александрович Майрович; born 6 February 1996) is a Russian professional footballer who plays as a forward.

== Club career ==
He made his debut for the main squad of FC Kuban Krasnodar on 28 February 2016 in a Russian Cup quarterfinal game against FC Zenit Saint Petersburg.

He made his Russian Premier League debut for Kuban on 5 March 2016 in a game against FC Rubin Kazan.

On 5 September 2021, Mayrovich returned to Noah. Mayrovich left Noah on 4 June 2022 after his contract expired.

== International ==
He won the 2013 UEFA European Under-17 Championship with the Russia national under-17 football team, scoring one goal in the group stage. He also participated in the 2013 FIFA U-17 World Cup with that squad.

== Personal life ==
He has a sister, Maria Mayrovich, who was a student-athlete at the University of Kansas.

== Career statistics ==
=== Club ===
As of match played 1 July 2023

Appearances and goals by club, season and competition
| Club | Season | League | | | National Cup | | Continental | | Other | | Total | |
| Club | Season | Division | Apps | Goals | Apps | Goals | Apps | Goals | Apps | Goals | Apps | Goals |
|---|---|---|---|---|---|---|---|---|---|---|---|---|
| Kuban Krasnodar | 2013–14 | Russian Premier League | 0 | 0 | 0 | 0 | 0 | 0 | — | | 0 | 0 |
| Kuban Krasnodar | 2014–15 | Russian Premier League | 0 | 0 | 0 | 0 | — | | — | | 0 | 0 |
| Kuban Krasnodar | 2015–16 | Russian Premier League | 12 | 1 | 1 | 0 | — | | 2 | 0 | 14 | 1 |
| Kuban Krasnodar | 2016–17 | RFNL | 14 | 0 | 0 | 0 | — | | — | | 14 | 0 |
| Kuban Krasnodar | 2017–18 | RFNL | 0 | 0 | 0 | 0 | — | | — | | 0 | 0 |
| Kuban Krasnodar | Total | | 26 | 1 | 1 | 0 | 0 | 0 | 2 | 0 | 29 | 1 |
| Kuban-2 Krasnodar (loan) | 2016–17 | RPFL | 21 | 2 | — | | — | | — | | 21 | 2 |
| Kuban-2 Krasnodar (loan) | 2017–18 | RPFL | 1 | 0 | — | | — | | — | | 1 | 0 |
| Kuban-2 Krasnodar (loan) | Total | | 22 | 2 | - | - | - | - | - | - | 22 | 2 |
| Chertanovo Moscow | 2017–18 | RFNL | 11 | 1 | 0 | 0 | — | | — | | 11 | 1 |
| Chertanovo Moscow | 2018–19 | RFNL | 15 | 2 | 1 | 0 | — | | — | | 16 | 2 |
| Chertanovo Moscow | Total | | 26 | 3 | 1 | 0 | - | - | - | - | 27 | 3 |
| Chertanovo-2 Moscow (loan) | 2018–19 | RPFL | 6 | 1 | — | | — | | — | | 6 | 1 |
| KAMAZ | 2018–19 | RPFL | 9 | 3 | 0 | 0 | — | | — | | 9 | 3 |
| Noah | 2019–20 | Armenian Premier League | 27 | 11 | 5 | 4 | — | | — | | 32 | 15 |
| Noah | 2020–21 | Armenian Premier League | 7 | 2 | 0 | 0 | — | | — | | 7 | 2 |
| Noah | Total | | 34 | 13 | 5 | 4 | - | - | - | - | 39 | 17 |
| Akron Tolyatti | 2020–21 | Russian Football National League | 15 | 1 | 0 | 0 | — | | — | | 15 | 1 |
| Akron Tolyatti | 2021–22 | Russian Football National League | 6 | 0 | 1 | 0 | — | | — | | 7 | 0 |
| Akron Tolyatti | Total | | 21 | 0 | 1 | 0 | - | - | - | - | 22 | 1 |
| Noah | 2021–22 | Armenian Premier League | 29 | 9 | 1 | 0 | — | | — | | 30 | 9 |
| Urartu | 2022–23 | Armenian Premier League | 26 | 8 | 3 | 1 | — | | — | | 29 | 9 |
| Career total | | | 199 | 40 | 12 | 6 | 0 | 0 | 2 | 0 | 213 | 46 |

== Honours and achievements ==
=== Club ===
Urartu

- Armenian Premier League (1): 2022–23
- Armenian Cup (1): 2022–23

FC Noah

- Armenian Cup (1): 2019–20
