= Agustín Maziero =

Argentine footballer

Personal information
- Full name: Agustín Maziero
- Date of birth: 27 November 1997 (age 28)
- Place of birth: Luis Palacios, Argentina
- Height: 1.79 m (5 ft 10 in)
- Position: Forward

Team information
- Current team: Nueva Chicago

Youth career
- El Porvenir del Norte
- 2011–2017: Rosario Central

Senior career*
Years	Team	Apps	(Gls)
2017–2020	Rosario Central	5	(2)
2019	→ Magallanes (loan)	8	(0)
2019	→ Sportivo Las Parejas (loan)	10	(0)
2020	Lori	7	(2)
2020–2021	Sahab SC		
2021–	Nueva Chicago	23	(5)
- * Club domestic league appearances and goals as of 14:35, 24 April 2022 (UTC)

Agustín Maziero (born 27 November 1997) is an Argentine footballer who plays as a forward for Nueva Chicago.

== Club career ==
Born in Luis Palacios, Santa Fe, Maziero joined Rosario Central's youth setup in 2011, from CA El Porvenir del Norte. He made his first team – and Primera División – debut on 26 November 2017, coming on as a late substitute for Marco Ruben in a 1–0 home win against Boca Juniors.

Maziero scored his first professional goal on 16 March 2018, netting a brace in a 3–1 home defeat of Chacarita Juniors.

On 8 February 2020, Maziero signed a one-year contract with Armenian Premier League club Lori FC. However, due to the 2020 Nagorno-Karabakh war between Armenia and Azerbaijan, Maziero left the club in October 2020, to join Sahab SC in Jordan. In July 2021, Maziero returned to Argentina, signing an 18-month long deal with Primera Nacional club Nueva Chicago.
