= Diego Barrios (Spanish footballer) =

Spanish footballer

Personal information
- Full name: Diego Barrios Pérez
- Date of birth: 30 July 1994 (age 32)
- Place of birth: Martos, Spain
- Height: 1.86 m (6 ft 1 in)
- Position: Goalkeeper

Team information
- Current team: Linares
- Number: 1

Youth career
- Pozuelo de Alarcón
- 2012–2013: Alcorcón

Senior career*
Years	Team	Apps	(Gls)
2013–2014	Alcorcón B	15	(0)
2014–2015	Puerta Bonita	15	(0)
2015–2016	Navalcarnero	13	(0)
2016–2017	Leganés B	27	(0)
2016	Leganés	1	(0)
2017–2018	SS Reyes	21	(0)
2018–2020	Valladolid B	2	(0)
2020	Lori	1	(0)
2020–2021	Real Jaén	7	(0)
2021–2024	Vélez	25	(0)
2024–2025	Antoniano	33	(0)
2025–	Linares	28	(0)
- * Club domestic league appearances and goals as of 15 May 2026

Diego Barrios Pérez (born 30 July 1994) is a Spanish footballer who plays for Segunda Federación club Linares as a goalkeeper.

== Club career ==
Born in Martos, Jaén, Andalusia, Barrios made his senior debut with AD Alcorcón's reserves in 2013, in Tercera División. On 5 August of the following year, he moved to fellow league team CD Puerta Bonita.

Barrios signed for CDA Navalcarnero also in the fourth tier on 9 July 2015. On 12 July of the following year he joined another reserve team, CD Leganés B in the same category.

On 18 December 2016, as starter Jon Ander Serantes was injured and Iago Herrerín was sent off, Barrios made his first team – and La Liga – debut by coming on as a first half substitute for Rubén Pérez in a 1–1 home draw against SD Eibar. It was his maiden appearance for the first-team, and he subsequently moved to Segunda División B side UD San Sebastián de los Reyes the following 14 July.

On 25 July 2018, Barrios signed for Real Valladolid and was assigned to the B-team in the third division; After a spell at Lori FC in Armenia, Barrios returned to Spain in the summer 2020 and was without club until 21 December 2020, when he signed for Real Jaén.
