= Mickaël Meira =

Portuguese footballer (born 1994)

Personal information
- Full name: Mickaël Meira
- Date of birth: 25 January 1994 (age 32)
- Place of birth: Ajaccio, France
- Height: 1.90 m (6 ft 3 in)
- Position: Goalkeeper

Youth career
- 2002–2003: Gazélec Ajaccio
- 2003–2006: GRAP
- 2006–2007: Benfica
- 2007–2009: Fátima
- 2009–2013: Sporting CP

Senior career*
| Years | Team | Apps | (Gls) |
| 2013–2014 | Sporting CP B | 13 | (0) |
| 2014 | AEL Limassol | 0 | (0) |
| 2015–2016 | Atlético | 30 | (0) |
| 2016–2017 | Boavista | 4 | (0) |
| 2018–2019 | Zimbru | 11 | (0) |
| 2019 | Gloria Buzău | 0 | (0) |
| 2020 | Lori | 5 | (0) |
| 2020–2021 | Amora | 2 | (0) |
| 2021 | Petrocub | 23 | (0) |
| 2022 | Hyères | 11 | (0) |
| 2023–2024 | Feronikeli 74 | 14 | (0) |

International career
| 2011 | Portugal U18 | 1 | (0) |
- * Club domestic league appearances and goals as of 9 May 2024

Mickaël Meira (born 25 January 1994) is a Portuguese professional footballer who plays as a goalkeeper.

== Club career ==
Meira was born in Ajaccio, France to a Portuguese father, and emigrated to Portugal at the age of 9. He started playing football in the latter country with Grupo Recreativo Amigos da Paz, finishing his development at Sporting CP after signing in 2009.

On 16 December 2013, Meira made his professional debut with the latter club's B team, appearing in a 2–0 home win against S.C. Braga B in the Segunda Liga. The following 31 August he signed with AEL Limassol from Cyprus, showing resentment towards his former employer for treatment he received in a farewell message. In the following transfer window, he returned to Portugal and joined Atlético Clube de Portugal, going on to spend one and a half seasons in the second tier with the team.

Meira moved to Boavista F.C. on 2 June 2016 on a three-year contract. His first Primeira Liga appearance took place on 18 September, in a 1–2 home loss to C.D. Feirense.

After a year out of football, Meira competed in the Moldovan National Division with FC Zimbru Chișinău. Ahead of the 2019–20 campaign, he joined SCM Gloria Buzău of Romania's Liga II, but was one of several players released by manager Ilie Stan at the halfway point.

Remaining in Eastern Europe, Meira signed with Lori FC for the rest of the Armenian Premier League season on 7 February 2020. On 25 January 2021, he agreed to a two-year deal at FC Petrocub Hîncești from Amora FC.

Meira joined Hyères FC of the French Championnat National 2 in January 2022.
