= Vitali Zaprudskikh =

Russian Footballer

Personal information
- Full name: Vitali Ivanovich Zaprudskikh
- Date of birth: 1 January 1991 (age 35)
- Place of birth: Tambov, Russian SFSR
- Height: 1.76 m (5 ft 9 in)
- Positions: Midfielder; defender

Team information
- Current team: Bars Issyk-Kul
- Number: 68

Senior career*
| Years | Team | Apps | (Gls) |
| 2011–2012 | Sibir-2 Novosibirsk | 45 | (0) |
| 2013 | Sibir Novosibirsk | 22 | (1) |
| 2014–2016 | Baltika Kaliningrad | 51 | (2) |
| 2016 | Tambov | 6 | (0) |
| 2017 | Sochi | 12 | (0) |
| 2017 | Zorky Krasnogorsk | 16 | (0) |
| 2018 | Volgar Astrakhan | 11 | (0) |
| 2018–2019 | Zorky Krasnogorsk | 20 | (2) |
| 2019–2020 | Noah | 11 | (0) |
| 2020 | Slutsk | 1 | (0) |
| 2021 | Gvardeyets Skvortsovo | 1 | (0) |
| 2021–2022 | Murom | 19 | (1) |
| 2022 | Spartak Tambov | 12 | (0) |
| 2023 | Atom Novovoronezh | | |
| 2025– | Bars Issyk-Kul | | |
- * Club domestic league appearances and goals as of 31 November 2024

Vitali Ivanovich Zaprudskikh (Russian: Виталий Иванович Запрудских; born 1 January 1991) is a Russian professional football player who plays for Bars Issyk-Kul.

== Club career ==
Zaprudskikh made his debut in the Russian Second Division for FC Sibir-2 Novosibirsk in 2008.

He made his Russian Football National League debut for FC Sibir Novosibirsk on 8 April 2013 in a game against FC Sakhalin Yuzhno-Sakhalinsk. He played 6 seasons in the FNL.

On 1 August 2020, FC Noah announced that Zaprudskikh had left the club.
