= Aleksei Turik =

Russian footballer

Personal information
- Full name: Aleksei Nikolayevich Turik
- Date of birth: 25 April 1995 (age 31)
- Place of birth: Moskovsky, Moscow, Russia
- Height: 1.78 m (5 ft 10 in)
- Position: Forward

Youth career
- DFSh Rosich Moskovsky
- Megasfera-Obruchevsky Moscow
- 2009–2014: Lokomotiv Moscow

Senior career*
Years	Team	Apps	(Gls)
2012–2014	Lokomotiv Moscow	0	(0)
2014–2016	Fakel Voronezh	38	(4)
2016–2017	Armavir	27	(1)
2017–2018	KAMAZ Naberezhnye Chelny	19	(2)
2018–2019	Zenit Izhevsk	20	(11)
2019	Noah	6	(0)
2020	Smolevichi	8	(0)
2020–2022	Yessentuki	32	(3)
2022	Yalta	1	(0)

International career
2010	Russia U15	2	(0)
2010–2011	Russia U16	13	(1)
2011–2012	Russia U17	10	(2)
2013	Russia U18	1	(0)
2014	Russia U19	5	(0)
- * Club domestic league appearances and goals

Aleksei Nikolayevich Turik (Russian: Алексей Николаевич Турик; born 25 April 1995) is a Russian former football player.

== Club career ==
Turik made his professional debut in the Russian Professional Football League for FC Fakel Voronezh on 28 August 2014 in a game against FC Tambov. He made his Russian Football National League debut for Fakel on 20 July 2015 in a game against FC Gazovik Orenburg. On 9 December 2019, Turik was released by FC Noah.
