= Xabi Auzmendi =

Spanish footballer (born 1997)

Personal information
- Full name: Xabier Auzmendi Arruabarrena
- Date of birth: 1 May 1997 (age 29)
- Place of birth: Segura, Spain
- Height: 1.80 m (5 ft 11 in)
- Position: Midfielder

Team information
- Current team: TransINVEST
- Number: 23

Youth career
- –2016: Antiguoko

Senior career*
Years	Team	Apps	(Gls)
2016–2019	Real Sociedad C	38	(5)
2016–2017	Real Sociedad B	0	(0)
2018	→ Beasain (loan)	9	(1)
2018–2019	→ Calahorra (loan)	23	(0)
2019–2020	Lori	23	(2)
2020–2021	Sestao	9	(1)
2021–2022	Sūduva	59	(12)
2023	Kauno Žalgiris	33	(7)
2024–2025	Polonia Warsaw	25	(1)
2025–	TransINVEST	32	(14)
- * Club domestic league appearances and goals as of 9 November 2026 (UTC)

Xabier Auzmendi Arruabarrena (born 1 May 1997) is a Spanish professional footballer who plays as a midfielder for TOPLYGA club TransINVEST.

== Career ==
He played for Lithuanian side Sūduva from 2021 to 2022.

On 2 January 2024, Auzmendi joined Polish second division club Polonia Warsaw on a six-month deal with an extension option.

On 12 September 2025, Auzmendi signed with Lithuanian second tier side TransINVEST.

== Personal life ==
Auzmendi is a native of Lazkao, Spain. He has been represented by Spanish football agency Total Football Sport Manager.

== Honours ==
Kauno Žalgiris

- Lithuanian Supercup: 2022
