= Luis Palacios, Santa Fe =

Luis Palacios
- Town
- Location of Luis Palacios in Argentina
- Coordinates: 32°47′S 60°54′W
- Country: Argentina
- Province: Santa Fe
- Department: San Lorenzo

Population
  - Total: 1,149
- Time zone: UTC−3 (ART)
- CPA base: S2142
- Dialing code: +54 3476

Luis Palacios is a town (comuna) in the province of Santa Fe, Argentina. It has 1,149 inhabitants per the 2001 census [INDEC].
