= Ruslan Zayerko =

Russian footballer

Personal information
- Full name: Ruslan Valeryevich Zayerko
- Date of birth: 27 June 1993 (age 33)
- Place of birth: Rossosh, Russia
- Height: 1.71 m (5 ft 7 in)
- Position: Midfielder

Youth career
- –2005: Khimik Rossosh
- 2006–2008: Yunost Moskvy-Spartak-2 Moscow
- 2008–2012: FShM Moscow

Senior career*
Years	Team	Apps	(Gls)
2012	Sparta Shchyolkovo		
2013–2016	Strogino Moscow	75	(15)
2016–2017	Torpedo Moscow	18	(2)
2017	Luch-Energiya Vladivostok	7	(0)
2018	Olimpiyets Nizhny Novgorod	8	(0)
2018	Botev Vratsa	0	(0)
2019	Lida	11	(5)
2019–2020	Lori	17	(4)
2021	Sokol Saratov	15	(1)
- * Club domestic league appearances and goals

Ruslan Valeryevich Zayerko (Russian: Руслан Валерьевич Заерко; born 27 June 1993) is a Russian former football midfielder.

== Career ==
=== Club ===
Zayerko made his debut in the Russian Second Division for FC Strogino Moscow on 15 July 2013 in a game against FC Torpedo Vladimir.

On 4 August 2019, Zayerko signed for Lori FC.
