= Moussa Diakité (footballer, born 1998) =

Malian footballer

Personal information
- Date of birth: 17 December 1998 (age 27)
- Place of birth: Bamako, Mali
- Height: 1.89 m (6 ft 2 in)
- Position: Midfielder

Team information
- Current team: JS Kairouan

Senior career*
Years	Team	Apps	(Gls)
2016	AS Korofina		
2017	Alcorcón B		
2017–2018	Atlético Astorga		
2018	Júpiter Leonés	3	(2)
2018	Shirak	8	(0)
2019	Botoșani	1	(0)
2019	Lori	9	(0)
2020	Djoliba AC		
2021–	JS Kairouan		

International career
2015	Mali U17	7	(0)
2017	Mali U20	3	(0)
- * Club domestic league appearances and goals as of 16 December 2019

Moussa Diakité (born 17 December 1998) is a Malian professional football player who plays for Cadiz CF.

== Career ==
=== Club ===
In the summer of 2018, Diakité joined Shirak. Six-months later, on 21 December 2018, Diakité left Shirak, signing for Botoșani on 10 January 2019.

On 10 September 2019, Lori FC announced the signing of Diakité on a one-year contract from Botoșani Diakité left Lori by mutual consent on 16 December 2019. Diakité then returned to Mali and joined Djoliba AC for the 2020 season.
