= 2017–18 FC Ararat Moscow season =

FC Ararat Moscow
2017-18 season
- Manager: Sergei Bulatov (until 30 July 2017); Arkadi Imrekov (Caretaker) (30 July-16 August 2017); Aleksandr Grigoryan (16 August-26 October 2017); Poghos Galstyan (Caretaker) (26 October-17 November 2017); Igor Zvezdin (17 November 2017 – 12 April 2018); Maksim Bukatkin (from 12 April 2018)
- Stadium: Spartakovets Stadium
- Professional Football League: 1st
- Russian Cup: Round of 32 vs SKA-Khabarovsk
- Top goalscorer: League: Roman Pavlyuchenko (9); All: Roman Pavlyuchenko (9)

The 2017–18 season is FC Ararat Moscow's first season of existing, during which they will play in the Russian Professional Football League and Russian Cup.

== Season events ==
On 30 July, Sergei Bulatov resigned from his position as manager, with Arkadi Imrekov taking over as caretaker manager. On 16 August 2017, Aleksandr Grigoryan was announced as Ararat's new permanent manager. On 26 October, Grigoryan resigned as the manager with Poghos Galstyan taking over as caretaker manager. On 17 November 2017, Samvel Karapetyan was appointed the president of the club and Igor Zvezdin as the head coach. On 12 April 2018, Zvezdin left the club and was replaced by Maksim Bukatkin.

== Transfers ==
=== Summer ===
In: Note: Flags indicate national team as defined under FIFA eligibility rules; some limited exceptions apply. Players may hold more than one non-FIFA nationality.

No.	Pos.	Nation	Player
1	GK	RUS	Vladimir Sugrobov (from (Russia) Sokol Saratov)
4	DF	ARM	Sergei Avagimyan (from (Russia) Ararat-2 Moscow)
5	FW	RUS	Igor Lebedenko (from (Russia) Akhmat Grozny)
7	MF	RUS	Aleksei Rebko (from (Russia) Luch-Energiya Vladivostok)
8	MF	RUS	Artyom Voronkin (from (Russia) Neftekhimik Nizhnekamsk)
9	FW	RUS	Roman Pavlyuchenko (from (Russia) Ural Yekaterinburg)
10	MF	RUS	Marat Izmailov (from (Russia) Krasnodar)
11	FW	RUS	Taymuraz Toboyev
15	DF	RUS	Yegor Tarakanov (from (Russia) Neftekhimik Nizhnekamsk)
16	GK	RUS	Anton Shitov (from (Russia) Lokomotiv Moscow)
17	MF	RUS	Aleksei Pugin (from (Russia) Tom Tomsk)
18	DF	ARM	Arkadi Kalaydzhyan (from (Russia) Sochi)
19	MF	ARM	Artak Aleksanyan
23	MF	RUS	Viktor Zemchenkov (from (Russia) Solyaris Moscow)
26	MF	ARM	Arsen Ayrapetyan (from (Russia) Shinnik Yaroslavl)
27	MF	RUS	David Khurtsidze (from (Georgia (country)) Torpedo Kutaisi)
32	DF	ARM	Ivan Mamakhanov
33	MF	GEO	Irakli Kvekveskiri (from (Armenia) Alashkert)
34	DF	RUS	Aleksandr Katsalapov
37	FW	RUS	Dmitri Ryzhov
66	DF	RUS	Konstantin Morozov (from (Russia) Sochi)
76	DF	RUS	Yevgeni Stukanov (from (Russia) Rotor Volgograd)
77	DF	RUS	Ilya Samoshnikov (from (Russia) Veles Moscow)
85	DF	RUS	Mikhail Popov (from (Russia) Luch-Energiya Vladivostok)
95	GK	RUS	Sergei Revyakin
97	MF	RUS	David Davidyan (from (Russia) Nosta Novotroitsk)
99	FW	RUS	Sergei Davydov
—	MF	RUS	David Ozmanyan

Out: Note: Flags indicate national team as defined under FIFA eligibility rules; some limited exceptions apply. Players may hold more than one non-FIFA nationality.

No.	Pos.	Nation	Player

=== Winter ===
In: Note: Flags indicate national team as defined under FIFA eligibility rules; some limited exceptions apply. Players may hold more than one non-FIFA nationality.

No.	Pos.	Nation	Player
1	GK	RUS	Yuri Shleyev (from (Russia) Anzhi Makhachkala)
10	FW	RUS	Artyom Avanesyan (from (Russia) Zenit Penza)
18	FW	RUS	Aleksei Kurzenyov (from (Russia) Sokol Saratov)
21	MF	RUS	Pavel Sergeyev (from (Russia) Tekstilshchik Ivanovo)
66	MF	RUS	Aleksei Samylin (from (Russia) Khimki)
92	MF	RUS	Artyom Novichkov (from (Russia) Kolomna)
—	DF	RUS	Konstantin Kadeyev (from (Russia) Karelia Petrozavodsk)
—	MF	RUS	David Khubayev (from (Russia) KAMAZ)
—	FW	RUS	Aleksandr Tarapovsky (from (Russia) Avangard Kursk)

Out: Note: Flags indicate national team as defined under FIFA eligibility rules; some limited exceptions apply. Players may hold more than one non-FIFA nationality.

No.	Pos.	Nation	Player
1	GK	RUS	Vladimir Sugrobov (to (Russia) Anzhi Makhachkala)
5	FW	RUS	Igor Lebedenko (to (Russia) Fakel Voronezh)
7	MF	RUS	Aleksei Rebko (to (Russia) Rotor Volgograd)
9	FW	RUS	Roman Pavlyuchenko
10	MF	RUS	Marat Izmailov
17	MF	RUS	Aleksei Pugin (to (Russia) Tom Tomsk)
18	DF	ARM	Arkadi Kalaydzhyan
19	MF	ARM	Artak Aleksanyan
23	MF	RUS	Viktor Zemchenkov
37	FW	RUS	Dmitri Ryzhov (to (Russia) Lada-Togliatti)
66	DF	RUS	Konstantin Morozov (to (Armenia) Alashkert)
76	DF	RUS	Yevgeni Stukanov (to (Russia) Dynamo Stavropol)
95	GK	RUS	Sergei Revyakin
99	FW	RUS	Sergei Davydov

== Squad ==
As of match played 26 May 2018

No.	Name	Nationality	Position	Date of birth (age)	Signed from	Signed in	Contract ends	Apps.	Goals
Goalkeepers
1	Yuri Shleyev	(Russia)	GK	26 June 1995 (age 30)	Anzhi Makhachkala	2018		0	0
16	Anton Shitov	(Russia)	GK	29 January 2000 (age 26)	Lokomotiv Moscow	2017		9	0
Defenders
4	Sergei Avagimyan	(Armenia)	DF	5 July 1989 (age 36)	Ararat-2 Moscow	2017		8	0
15	Yegor Tarakanov	(Russia)	DF	17 April 1987 (age 38)	Neftekhimik Nizhnekamsk	2017		28	2
32	Ivan Mamakhanov	(Armenia)	DF	26 February 1996 (age 29)		2017		12	0
34	Aleksandr Katsalapov	(Russia)	DF	5 April 1986 (age 39)		2017		29	3
77	Ilya Samoshnikov	(Russia)	DF	14 November 1997 (age 28)	Veles Moscow	2017		23	1
85	Mikhail Popov	(Russia)	DF	25 September 1985 (age 40)	Luch-Energiya Vladivostok	2017		17	1
	Konstantin Kadeyev	(Russia)	DF	17 January 1989 (age 37)	Karelia Petrozavodsk	2018		0	0
Midfielders
8	Artyom Voronkin	(Russia)	MF	19 February 1986 (age 39)	Neftekhimik Nizhnekamsk	2017		25	1
21	Pavel Sergeyev	(Russia)	MF	20 June 1993 (age 32)	Tekstilshchik Ivanovo	2018		6	0
26	Arsen Ayrapetyan	(Armenia)	MF	16 February 1997 (age 28)	Shinnik Yaroslavl	2017		23	1
27	David Khurtsidze	(Russia)	MF	4 July 1993 (age 32)	Torpedo Kutaisi	2017		28	6
33	Irakli Kvekveskiri	(Georgia (country))	MF	12 March 1990 (age 35)	Alashkert	2017		22	1
66	Aleksei Samylin	(Russia)	MF	15 October 1997 (age 28)	Khimki	2018		6	0
92	Artyom Novichkov	(Russia)	MF	30 May 1992 (age 33)	Kolomna	2018		8	0
97	David Davidyan	(Russia)	MF	14 December 1997 (age 28)	Nosta Novotroitsk	2017		14	4
	David Khubayev	(Russia)	MF	1 October 1994 (age 31)	KAMAZ	2018		0	0
	David Ozmanyan	(Russia)	DF			2017		0	0
Forwards
10	Artyom Avanesyan	(Russia)	FW	17 July 1999 (age 26)	Zenit Penza	2018		8	1
11	Taymuraz Toboyev	(Russia)	FW	9 March 1995 (age 30)		2017		25	8
18	Aleksei Kurzenyov	(Russia)	FW	9 January 1995 (age 31)	Sokol Saratov	2018		7	2
	Aleksandr Tarapovsky	(Russia)	FW	15 February 1997 (age 28)	Avangard Kursk	2018		0	0
Left during the season
1	Vladimir Sugrobov	(Russia)	GK	10 September 1996 (age 29)	Sokol Saratov	2017		16	0
5	Igor Lebedenko	(Russia)	FW	27 May 1983 (age 42)	Akhmat Grozny	2017		20	5
7	Aleksei Rebko	(Russia)	MF	23 April 1986 (age 39)	Luch-Energiya Vladivostok	2017		16	2
9	Roman Pavlyuchenko	(Russia)	FW	15 December 1981 (age 44)	Ural Yekaterinburg	2017		13	9
10	Marat Izmailov	(Russia)	MF	21 September 1982 (age 43)	Krasnodar	2017		4	2
17	Aleksei Pugin	(Russia)	MF	7 March 1987 (age 38)	Tom Tomsk	2017		13	1
18	Arkadi Kalaydzhyan	(Armenia)	DF	1 December 1992 (age 33)	Sochi	2017		4	0
19	Artak Aleksanyan	(Armenia)	MF	10 March 1991 (age 34)		2017		7	0
23	Viktor Zemchenkov	(Russia)	MF	15 September 1986 (age 39)	Solyaris Moscow	2017		17	4
37	Dmitri Ryzhov	(Russia)	FW	26 August 1989 (age 36)		2017		9	1
66	Konstantin Morozov	(Russia)	DF	13 May 1992 (age 33)	Sochi	2017		4	0
76	Yevgeni Stukanov	(Russia)	DF	1 September 1996 (age 29)		2017		1	0
95	Sergei Revyakin	(Russia)	GK	2 April 1995 (age 30)		2017		4	0
99	Sergei Davydov	(Russia)	FW	22 July 1985 (age 40)		2017		8	1

== Competitions ==
=== Russian Professional Football League ===
==== Results summary ====
Overall								Home						Away					
Pld	W	D	L	GF	GA	GD	Pts	W	D	L	GF	GA	GD	W	D	L	GF	GA	GD
26	19	6	1	49	15	+34	63	11	1	1	28	7	+21	8	5	0	21	8	+13

Last updated: 26 May 2018.
Source: See Results

==== Results ====
19 July 2017 1	Zorky Krasnogorsk	0 – 3	Ararat Moscow	Krasnogorsk
19:00 MSK (UTC+3)	Tsukanov (yellow card) 40'	Report	Lebedenko 10'; Pavlyuchenko 23', 40'	Stadium: Zorky Stadium; Attendance: 5,000; Referee: Vasily Kazartsev

28 July 2017 2	Ararat Moscow	2 – 2	Kaluga	Moscow
19:00 MSK (UTC+3)	Popov (yellow card) 18'; Lebedenko 34'; Pavlyuchenko 53'; Morozov (red card) 77'	Report	Tarakanov 10' (o.g.); Syomin (yellow card) 40'; Gurov 83'	Stadium: Spartakovets Stadium; Attendance: 700; Referee: Dmitry Sukhov

3 August 2017 3	Saturn Ramenskoye	1 – 2	Ararat Moscow	Ramenskoye
19:00 MSK (UTC+3)	Yan Shanin 23'	Report	Pavlyuchenko 60'; Izmailov 62'	Stadium: Saturn Stadium; Attendance: 5,500; Referee: Alexey Amelin

11 August 2017 4	Ararat Moscow	3 – 0	Khimik Novomoskovsk	Moscow
19:00 MSK (UTC+3)	Khurtsidze 25'; Katsalapov (yellow card) 51'; Lebedenko 60'; Pavlyuchenko 69'	Report	Vasili Oreshkin (yellow card) 72'	Stadium: Spartakovets Stadium; Attendance: 500; Referee: Sergey Kostevich

18 August 2017 5	Energomash Belgorod	1 – 2	Ararat Moscow	Belgorod
19:00 MSK (UTC+3)	Sergei Kudrin 23'; Kalugin (yellow card) 31'; Sergeyev (yellow card) 43' (yellow-red card) 57'; Samsonov (yellow card) 45'; Belobayev (yellow card) 49'; Butyrin (yellow card) 89'	Report	Rebko (yellow card) 22'; Samoshnikov (yellow card) 37' (yellow-red card) 90'; Popov (yellow card) 42'; Izmailov 46' (yellow card) 85'; Pavlyuchenko 64'	Stadium: Energomash Stadium; Attendance: 9,400; Referee: Stanislav Vasilyev

27 August 2017 6	Ararat Moscow	4 – 0	Zenit Penza	Moscow
17:00 MSK (UTC+3)	Zemchenkov 8', 62'; Ayrapetyan 18'; Khurtsidze (yellow card) 30'; Ryzhov 81'	Report	Manuylov (yellow card) 7'; Kiritsa (yellow card) 87'	Stadium: Spartakovets Stadium; Attendance: 500; Referee: Yuri Karpov

2 September 2017 7	Metallurg Lipetsk	1 – 1	Ararat Moscow	Lipetsk
16:00 MSK (UTC+3)	Chernyshov (yellow card) 16'; Skripnik (red card) 31'; Akhvlediani 71'; Frolov (yellow card) 90+'; Kharin (yellow card) 90+'	Report	Rebko (yellow card) 15'; Samoshnikov (yellow card) 17'; Lebedenko 44'; Kvekveskiri (yellow card) 76'	Stadium: Metallurg Stadium; Attendance: 500; Referee: Stanislav Isaev

7 September 2017 8	Ararat Moscow	1 – 0	Ryazan	Moscow
19:00 MSK (UTC+3)	Tarakanov (yellow card) 41' (goal) 90+'; Katsalapov (yellow card) 48'; Rebko (yellow card) 84'	Report	Labzin (yellow card) 44'; Sklyarov (yellow card) 73'; Oleg Yeliseyev (yellow card) 83'	Stadium: Spartakovets Stadium; Attendance: 1,000; Referee: Artem Lyubimov

16 September 2017 9	Ararat Moscow	4 – 0	Sokol Saratov	Moscow
17:00 MSK (UTC+3)	Pugin 57'; Lebedenko 77'; Tarakanov 89'; Davidyan 90+'	Report	Shishkin (yellow card) 7'; Chernyshov (yellow card) 56'; Dudikov (yellow card) 74'; Tautiyev (yellow card) 78'; Baryshnikov (yellow card) 85'	Stadium: Spartakovets Stadium; Attendance: 700; Referee: Ivan Sidenkov

25 September 2017 10	Ararat Moscow	3 – 2	Torpedo Moscow	Moscow
19:00 MSK (UTC+3)	Pavlyuchenko 31', 57'; Zemchenkov 42'; Pugin (yellow card) 44'; Davidyan (yellow card) 82'; Popov (yellow card) 88'	Report	Sadykhov 8'; Kashayev 29'; Tregulov (yellow card) 75'; Sergeyev (yellow card) 86'	Stadium: Spartakovets Stadium; Attendance: 3,500; Referee: Anton Frolov

1 October 2017 11	Strogino Moscow	1 – 2	Ararat Moscow	Moscow
17:00 MSK (UTC+3)	Nebiyeridze 10'	Report	Rebko 24'; Pavlyuchenko 45'; Samoshnikov (yellow card) 88'	Stadium: Yantar Stadium; Attendance: 600; Referee: Yuri Aponasenko

7 October 2017 12	Ararat Moscow	1 – 0	Dynamo Bryansk	Moscow
18:00 MSK (UTC+3)	Lebedenko (yellow card) 43'; Zemchenkov (yellow card) 52'; Katsalapov 78'	Report	Ponomaryov (yellow card) 9'; Denis Frolov (yellow card) 15'; Artyom Maslevskiy (yellow card) 90+'	Stadium: Spartakovets Stadium; Attendance: 500; Referee: Artur Fedorov

14 October 2017 13	Ararat Moscow	2 – 0	Rotor-2 Volgograd	Moscow
17:00 MSK (UTC+3)	Toboyev 58', 60'	Report		Stadium: Spartakovets Stadium; Attendance: 300; Referee: Sergey Tikhonov

21 October 2017 14	Kaluga	0 – 1	Ararat Moscow	Kaluga
14:00 MSK (UTC+3)	Boychuk (yellow card) 65'; Dmitri Baranov (yellow card) 72'; Dubrovin (yellow card) 84'; Mikhail Kuleshov (yellow card) 87'	Report	Avagimyan (yellow card) 23'; Kvekveskiri (yellow card) 38'; Pavlyuchenko (yellow card) 42'; Rebko 84'	Stadium: Annenki Arena; Attendance: 1,100; Referee: Ivan Abrosimov

28 October 2017 15	Ararat Moscow	2 – 0	Saturn Ramenskoye	Moscow
15:00 MSK (UTC+3)	Katsalapov 25'; Samoshnikov 29'	Report	Korolyov (yellow card) 73'	Stadium: Spartakovets Stadium; Attendance: 400; Referee: Ivan Sarayev

4 November 2017 16	Khimik Novomoskovsk	0 – 0	Ararat Moscow	Novomoskovsk
14:00 MSK (UTC+3)	Vasili Oreshkin (yellow card) 3'; Ryzhov (yellow card) 33'; Mingazov (penalty missed) 36'; Pavel Belyanin (yellow card) 71'	Report	Sugrobov (yellow card) 35'; Kvekveskiri (yellow card) 85'	Stadium: Khimik Stadium; Attendance: 2,000; Referee: Igor Nizovtsev

11 November 2017 17	Ararat Moscow	1 – 0	Energomash Belgorod	Moscow
15:00 MSK (UTC+3)	Toboyev (yellow card) 18'; Davidyan 55'; Kvekveskiri (yellow card) 83'	Report	Burchenko (yellow card) 9'; Butyrin (yellow card) 41' (yellow-red card) 80'; Belobayev (yellow card) 52'	Stadium: Spartakovets Stadium; Attendance: 700; Referee: Yuri Karpov

7 April 2018 18	Zenit Penza	0 – 3	Ararat Moscow	Penza
MSK (UTC+3)				Stadium: Stadium 1st May
Note: Ararat Moscow were awarded a Walkover victory due to Zenit Penza being removed from the league.

14 April 2018 19	Ararat Moscow	3 – 0	Metallurg Lipetsk	Moscow
14:00 MSK (UTC+3)	Khurtsidze (yellow card) 7'; Popov 15'; Kvekveskiri (yellow card) 38'; Avanesyan 60'; Toboyev (yellow card) 83'; Davidyan 86'	Report	Bayazov (yellow card) 44'; Titov (yellow card) 56'; Akhvlediani (yellow card) 90'	Stadium: Spartakovets Stadium; Attendance: 215; Referee: Stanislav Vyacheslavovich Isaev

21 April 2018 20	Ryazan	0 – 2	Ararat Moscow	Ryazan
18:30 MSK (UTC+3)	Labzin (yellow card) 71'	Report	Davidyan (yellow card) 52' (goal) 64'; Khurtsidze (penalty missed) 72' 72'; Kurzenyov (yellow card) 81'	Stadium: CSK Stadium; Attendance: 600; Referee: Sergey Nikolaevich Kulikov

28 April 2018 21	Sokol Saratov	1 – 1	Ararat Moscow	Saratov
18:00 MSK (UTC+3)	Dudikov (penalty missed) 26' 26'; Perchenok (yellow card) 48'; Pavlov (yellow card) 65'	Report	Khurtsidze 22'; Davidyan (yellow card) 86'	Stadium: Lokomotiv Stadium; Attendance: 1,080; Referee: Yegor Egorov

4 May 2018 22	Torpedo Moscow	1 – 1	Ararat Moscow	Moscow
20:00 MSK (UTC+3)	Roman Izotov 24'; Kosyanchuk (yellow card) 63'; Kashayev (yellow card) 83'	Report	Katsalapov 25' (yellow card) 55'; Kurzenyov (yellow card) 90'	Stadium: Eduard Streltsov Stadium; Attendance: 2,400; Referee: Alexander Borisov

11 May 2018 23	Ararat Moscow	5 – 3	Strogino Moscow	Moscow
15:00 MSK (UTC+3)	Kurzenyov 24'; Toboyev 25', 30', 34', 90+'	Report	Ryzhov 6'; Polikarpov 79', 82'; Pogorelov (yellow card) 90+'	Stadium: Spartakovets Stadium; Attendance: 300; Referee: Roman Safyan

16 May 2018 24	Dynamo Bryansk	0 – 0	Ararat Moscow	Bryansk
18:30 MSK (UTC+3)	Starkov (yellow card) 35'; Lyadnev (yellow card) 45'; Nikita Bondarev (yellow card) 75'; Lukanchenkov (yellow card) 86'	Report	Kvekveskiri (yellow card) 35'; Kurzenyov (yellow card) 90+'	Stadium: Dynamo Stadium; Attendance: 2,000; Referee: Sergey Tikhonov

20 May 2018 25	Rotor-2 Volgograd	2 – 3	Ararat Moscow	Volgograd
15:00 MSK (UTC+3)	Shabichev 50'; Abramov 53'; Lavrishchev (yellow card) 83'	Report	Kurzenyov 20' (yellow card) 26'; Kvekveskiri (yellow card) 60' (goal) 81'; Toboyev 65'; Sergeyev (yellow card) 66'; Ayrapetyan (yellow card) 90'	Stadium: Neftyanik Stadium; Attendance: 350; Referee: Sergey Kostevich

26 May 2018 26	Ararat Moscow	0 – 2	Zorky Krasnogorsk	Moscow
17:00 MSK (UTC+3)	Kvekveskiri (yellow card) 17'; Tarakanov (yellow card) 57'; Katsalapov (yellow card) 72'	Report	Degtyaryov (yellow card) 13'; Tsimbal (yellow card) 17'; Sorokin 30'; Pavlov 38'; Belov (yellow card) 65'; Loktionov (yellow card) 83'; Bochkaryov (yellow card) 88'	Stadium: Spartakovets Stadium; Attendance: 230; Referee: Artur Fedorov

==== League table ====
Pos	Team	Pld	W	D	L	GF	GA	GD	Pts	Promotion or relegation
1	Ararat Moscow	26	19	6	1	52	17	+35	63	Dissolved after season
2	Energomash Belgorod	26	15	8	3	45	20	+25	53	Dissolved after season
3	Ryazan	26	14	4	8	37	23	+14	46	
4	Zorky Krasnogorsk	26	13	4	9	42	26	+16	43	
5	Metallurg Lipetsk	26	12	7	7	34	34	0	43	

Rules for classification: 1. points won; 2. games won; 3. points in head-to-head matches; 4. games won in head-to-head matches; 5. goal difference in head-to-head matches; 6. goals scored in head-to-head matches; 7. away goals in head-to-head matches; 8. total goal difference; 9. total goals scored; 10. total away goals scored.

=== Russian Cup ===
23 July 2017 Second Round	FSK Dolgoprudny	1 – 3	Ararat Moscow	Dolgoprudny
16:00 MSK (UTC+3)	Larionov 27'; Ilya Mironov (yellow card) 43'; Trinitatskiy (yellow card) 90'	Report	Voronkin 13'; Khurtsidze 42', 71'; Morozov (yellow card) 57'	Stadium: Salyut Stadium; Attendance: 1,300; Referee: Artur Fedorov

7 August 2017 Third Round	Ararat Moscow	1 – 0	Saturn Ramenskoye	Moscow
19:00 MSK (UTC+3)	Aleksanyan (yellow card) 20'; Voronkin (yellow card) 40'; Toboyev 83'; Kalaydzhyan (yellow card) 90+'	Report	Yan Shanin (yellow card) 40'; Magomedov (yellow card) 81'; Chernyshov (yellow card) 90+'	Stadium: Eduard Streltsov Stadium; Attendance: 900; Referee: Petr Miroshnichenko

23 August 2017 Fourth Round	Ararat Moscow	2 – 1	Baltika Kaliningrad	Moscow
19:00 MSK (UTC+3)	Khurtsidze 9'; Davydov 41' (yellow card) 42'	Report	Stepanets 23' (yellow card) 57'; Logashov (yellow card) 67'	Stadium: Eduard Streltsov Stadium; Attendance: 1,000; Referee: Ranel Ziyakov

21 September 2017 Round of 32	Ararat Moscow	1 – 2	SKA Khabarovsk	Moscow
19:00 MSK (UTC+3)	Zemchenkov 48'; Kvekveskiri (yellow card) 50'; Tarakanov (yellow card) 65'; Samoshnikov (yellow card) 70'	Report	Balyaikin (yellow card) 61'; Kazankov 68'; Kalinsky 80'	Stadium: Eduard Streltsov Stadium; Attendance: 700; Referee: Dmitry Nedvizh

== Squad statistics ==
As of Match played 26 May 2018

=== Appearances and goals ===
No.	Pos	Nat	Player	Total		Professional Football League		Russian Cup	
No.	Pos	Nat	Player	Apps	Goals	Apps	Goals	Apps	Goals
4	DF	(Armenia) ARM	Sergei Avagimyan	8	0	5+3	0	0	0
8	MF	(Russia) RUS	Artyom Voronkin	25	1	12+10	0	2+1	1
10	MF	(Russia) RUS	Artyom Avanesyan	8	1	8	1	0	0
11	FW	(Russia) RUS	Taymuraz Toboyev	25	8	7+14	7	2+2	1
15	DF	(Russia) RUS	Yegor Tarakanov	28	2	24	2	4	0
16	GK	(Russia) RUS	Anton Shitov	9	0	9	0	0	0
18	FW	(Russia) RUS	Aleksei Kurzenyov	7	2	7	2	0	0
21	MF	(Russia) RUS	Pavel Sergeyev	6	0	3+3	0	0	0
26	MF	(Armenia) ARM	Arsen Ayrapetyan	23	1	3+18	1	1+1	0
27	MF	(Russia) RUS	David Khurtsidze	28	6	19+5	3	4	3
32	DF	(Armenia) ARM	Ivan Mamakhanov	12	0	2+10	0	0	0
33	MF	(Georgia (country)) GEO	Irakli Kvekveskiri	22	1	20	1	2	0
34	DF	(Russia) RUS	Aleksandr Katsalapov	29	3	25	3	4	0
66	MF	(Russia) RUS	Aleksei Samylin	6	0	0+6	0	0	0
77	DF	(Russia) RUS	Ilya Samoshnikov	23	1	16+3	1	3+1	0
85	DF	(Russia) RUS	Mikhail Popov	17	1	15	1	2	0
92	MF	(Russia) RUS	Artyom Novichkov	8	0	8	0	0	0
97	MF	(Russia) RUS	David Davidyan	14	4	5+7	4	0+2	0
Players away from Ararat Moscow on loan:
Players who left Ararat Moscow during the season:
1	GK	(Russia) RUS	Vladimir Sugrobov	16	0	15	0	1	0
5	FW	(Russia) RUS	Igor Lebedenko	20	5	16+1	5	3	0
7	MF	(Russia) RUS	Aleksei Rebko	16	2	13	2	3	0
9	FW	(Russia) RUS	Roman Pavlyuchenko	13	9	11	9	2	0
10	MF	(Russia) RUS	Marat Izmailov	4	2	4	2	0	0
17	MF	(Russia) RUS	Aleksei Pugin	13	1	11	1	2	0
18	DF	(Armenia) ARM	Arkadi Kalaydzhyan	4	0	0+2	0	0+2	0
19	MF	(Armenia) ARM	Artak Aleksanyan	7	0	2+2	0	2+1	0
23	MF	(Russia) RUS	Viktor Zemchenkov	17	4	11+2	3	2+2	1
37	FW	(Russia) RUS	Dmitri Ryzhov	9	1	0+6	1	0+3	0
66	DF	(Russia) RUS	Konstantin Morozov	4	0	1+1	0	1+1	0
76	DF	(Russia) RUS	Yevgeni Stukanov	1	0	0+1	0	0	0
95	GK	(Russia) RUS	Sergei Revyakin	4	0	1	0	3	0
99	FW	(Russia) RUS	Sergei Davydov	8	1	1+5	0	1+1	1

=== Goal scorers ===
Place	Position	Nation	Number	Name	Professional Football League	Russian Cup	Total
1	FW	(Russia)	9	Roman Pavlyuchenko	9	0	9
2	FW	(Russia)	11	Taymuraz Toboyev	7	1	8
3	MF	(Russia)	27	David Khurtsidze	3	3	6
4	FW	(Russia)	5	Igor Lebedenko	5	0	5
5	MF	(Russia)	97	David Davidyan	4	0	4
5	MF	(Russia)	23	Viktor Zemchenkov	3	1	4
7	DF	(Russia)	34	Aleksandr Katsalapov	3	0	3
8	MF	(Russia)	10	Marat Izmailov	2	0	2
8	DF	(Russia)	15	Yegor Tarakanov	2	0	2
8	MF	(Russia)	7	Aleksei Rebko	2	0	2
8	FW	(Russia)	18	Aleksei Kurzenyov	2	0	2
12	MF	(Armenia)	26	Arsen Ayrapetyan	1	0	1
12	FW	(Russia)	37	Dmitri Ryzhov	1	0	1
12	MF	(Russia)	17	Aleksei Pugin	1	0	1
12	DF	(Russia)	77	Ilya Samoshnikov	1	0	1
12	DF	(Russia)	85	Mikhail Popov	1	0	1
12	FW	(Russia)	10	Artyom Avanesyan	1	0	1
12	MF	(Georgia (country))	33	Irakli Kvekveskiri	1	0	1
12	MF	(Russia)	8	Artyom Voronkin	0	1	1
12	FW	(Russia)	99	Sergei Davydov	0	1	1
				Awarded	3	0	3
				TOTALS	52	7	59

=== Disciplinary record ===
Number	Nation	Position	Name	Professional Football League		Russian Cup		Total	
Number	Nation	Position	Name	Booked	Sent off (straight red)	Booked	Sent off (straight red)	Booked	Sent off (straight red)
1	(Russia)	GK	Vladimir Sugrobov	1	0	0	0	1	0
4	(Armenia)	DF	Sergei Avagimyan	1	0	0	0	1	0
8	(Russia)	MF	Artyom Voronkin	0	0	1	0	1	0
11	(Russia)	FW	Taymuraz Toboyev	2	0	0	0	2	0
15	(Russia)	DF	Yegor Tarakanov	2	0	1	0	3	0
18	(Russia)	FW	Aleksei Kurzenyov	4	0	0	0	4	0
21	(Russia)	MF	Pavel Sergeyev	1	0	0	0	1	0
26	(Armenia)	MF	Arsen Ayrapetyan	1	0	0	0	1	0
27	(Russia)	MF	David Khurtsidze	2	0	0	0	2	0
33	(Georgia (country))	MF	Irakli Kvekveskiri	8	0	1	0	9	0
34	(Russia)	DF	Aleksandr Katsalapov	4	0	0	0	4	0
77	(Russia)	DF	Ilya Samoshnikov	4	1	1	0	5	1
85	(Russia)	DF	Mikhail Popov	3	0	0	0	3	0
97	(Russia)	MF	David Davidyan	3	0	0	0	3	0
Players who left Ararat Moscow during the season:
7	(Russia)	MF	Aleksei Rebko	3	0	0	0	3	0
9	(Russia)	FW	Roman Pavlyuchenko	1	0	0	0	1	0
10	(Russia)	MF	Marat Izmailov	1	0	0	0	1	0
17	(Russia)	MF	Aleksei Pugin	1	0	0	0	1	0
18	(Armenia)	DF	Arkadi Kalaydzhyan	0	0	1	0	1	0
19	(Armenia)	MF	Artak Aleksanyan	0	0	1	0	1	0
66	(Russia)	DF	Konstantin Morozov	0	1	1	0	1	1
99	(Russia)	FW	Sergei Davydov	0	0	1	0	1	0
			TOTALS	42	2	8	0	50	2
