= Anton Shitov =

Russian footballer

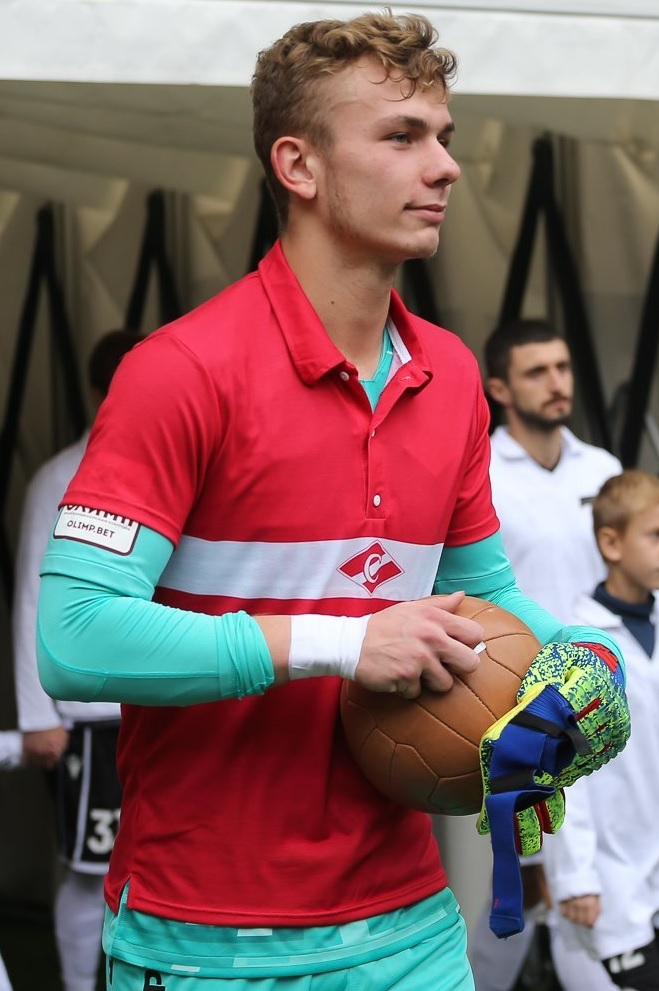
- Shitov with Spartak-2 Moscow in 2019

Personal information
- Full name: Anton Alekseyevich Shitov
- Date of birth: 29 January 2000 (age 26)
- Place of birth: Moscow, Russia
- Height: 1.90 m (6 ft 3 in)
- Position: Goalkeeper

Youth career
- 2016–2017: FC Lokomotiv Moscow
- 2018–2020: FC Spartak Moscow

Senior career*
| Years | Team | Apps | (Gls) |
| 2017–2018 | FC Ararat Moscow | 9 | (0) |
| 2018–2022 | FC Spartak-2 Moscow | 21 | (0) |
| 2019–2023 | FC Spartak Moscow | 0 | (0) |
| 2023–2025 | FC Veles Moscow | 20 | (0) |
| 2025–2026 | FC Dynamo Vladivostok | 42 | (0) |

International career^{‡}
| 2015–2016 | Russia U-16 | 8 | (0) |
| 2016–2017 | Russia U-17 | 14 | (0) |
| 2018 | Russia U-18 | 4 | (0) |
| 2018–2019 | Russia U-19 | 10 | (0) |
- * Club domestic league appearances and goals as of 14 June 2026 ‡ National team caps and goals as of 23 March 2019

Anton Alekseyevich Shitov (Russian: Антон Алексеевич Шитов; born 29 January 2000) is a Russian football player.

== Career ==
=== Club ===
Shitov made his debut in the Russian Professional Football League for FC Ararat Moscow on 28 July 2017 in a game against FC Kaluga. He made his Russian Football National League debut for FC Spartak-2 Moscow on 13 April 2019 in a game against FC SKA-Khabarovsk.

Shitov left Spartak in June 2023.

=== International ===
Shitov represented Russia national under-17 football team in the 2017 UEFA European Under-17 Championship qualification.

== Career statistics ==
=== Club ===
As of match played 16 May 2022

Appearances and goals by club, season and competition
| Club | Season | League | | | National Cup | | League Cup | | Continental | | Other | | Total | |
| Club | Season | Division | Apps | Goals | Apps | Goals | Apps | Goals | Apps | Goals | Apps | Goals | Apps | Goals |
|---|---|---|---|---|---|---|---|---|---|---|---|---|---|---|
| Lokomotiv Moscow | 2016–17 | Premier League | 0 | 0 | 0 | 0 | – | | – | | – | | 0 | 0 |
| Ararat Moscow | 2017–18 | Professional Football League | 1 | 0 | 0 | 0 | – | | – | | – | | 1 | 0 |
| Spartak-2 Moscow | 2018–19 | FNL | 8 | 0 | 0 | 0 | – | | – | | – | | 8 | 0 |
| Spartak-2 Moscow | 2019–20 | FNL | 7 | 0 | 0 | 0 | – | | – | | – | | 7 | 0 |
| Spartak-2 Moscow | 2020–21 | FNL | 4 | 0 | 0 | 0 | – | | – | | – | | 4 | 0 |
| Spartak-2 Moscow | 2021–22 | FNL | 2 | 0 | 0 | 0 | – | | – | | – | | 2 | 0 |
| Spartak-2 Moscow | Total | | 21 | 0 | 0 | 0 | – | | – | | – | | 21 | 0 |
| Spartak Moscow | 2022–23 | Premier League | 0 | 0 | 0 | 0 | – | | – | | – | | 0 | 0 |
| Career total | | | 22 | 0 | 0 | 0 | – | – | – | –- | – | – | 22 | 0 |
