= Yevgeni Stukanov =

Russian footballer (born 1996)

Personal information
- Full name: Yevgeni Dmitriyevich Stukanov
- Date of birth: 9 January 1996 (age 30)
- Place of birth: Volgograd, Russia
- Height: 1.72 m (5 ft 8 in)
- Position: Midfielder

Senior career*
Years	Team	Apps	(Gls)
2011–2012	Olimpia-2 Volgograd		
2013	Rostov-M-2 Rostov-on-Don		
2013–2014	FC SKVO Rostov-on-Don	18	(1)
2015–2016	FC Rostov	0	(0)
2016–2017	FC Rotor Volgograd	27	(6)
2017	FC Ararat Moscow	1	(0)
2017	FC Olimpiyets Nizhny Novgorod	0	(0)
2018	FC Dynamo Stavropol	14	(3)
2018	FC Urozhay Krasnodar	7	(1)
2019	FC Mashuk-KMV Pyatigorsk	10	(1)
2019–2020	FC Inter Cherkessk	17	(1)
2020	FC Kolomna	6	(0)
2021	FC Tuapse	14	(4)
- * Club domestic league appearances and goals

Yevgeni Dmitriyevich Stukanov (Russian: Евгений Дмитриевич Стуканов; born 9 January 1996) is a Russian former football midfielder.

== Club career ==
He made his debut in the Russian Second Division for FC SKVO Rostov-on-Don on 12 July 2013, in a game against FC Torpedo Armavir.

He played his first game for the main squad of FC Rostov on 24 September 2015, in a Russian Cup game against FC Tosno.

== Career statistics ==
=== Club ===
As of match played 28 July 2017

Appearances and goals by club, season and competition
Club	Season	League			National Cup		League Cup		Continental		Other		Total	
Club	Season	Division	Apps	Goals	Apps	Goals	Apps	Goals	Apps	Goals	Apps	Goals	Apps	Goals
Rostov	2015–16	Russian Premier League	0	0	1	0	–		–		–		1	0
Rotor Volgograd	2016–17	Professional Football League	27	6	0	0	–		–		–		27	6
Ararat Moscow	2017–18	Professional Football League	1	0	0	0	–		–		–		1	0
Career total			28	6	1	0	-	-	-	-	-	-	29	6
