= Marat Izmailov =

Russian footballer (born 1982)

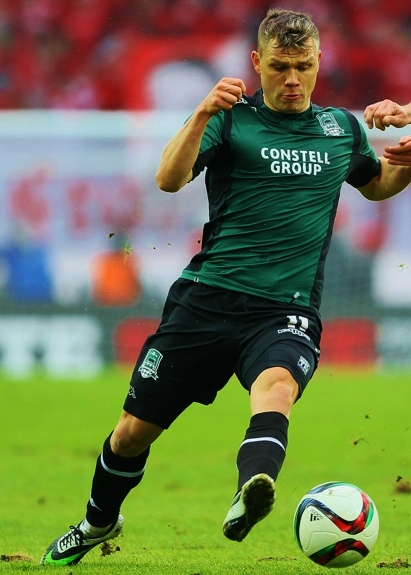
- Izmailov with Krasnodar in 2015

Personal information
- Full name: Marat Nailevich Izmailov
- Date of birth: 21 September 1982 (age 44)
- Place of birth: Moscow, Soviet Union
- Height: 1.72 m (5 ft 7 1/2 in)
- Position: Midfielder

Senior career*
Years	Team	Apps	(Gls)
2000	Lokomotiv B	18	(1)
2001–2008	Lokomotiv Moscow	124	(20)
2007–2008	→ Sporting CP (loan)	23	(4)
2008–2013	Sporting CP	59	(9)
2013–2015	Porto	13	(1)
2014	→ Gabala (loan)	14	(1)
2014–2015	→ Krasnodar (loan)	22	(1)
2016–2017	Krasnodar	7	(1)
2017	Ararat Moscow	4	(2)
Total		294	(40)

International career
2001–2003	Russia U-21	5	(1)
2001–2012	Russia	35	(2)
- * Club domestic league appearances and goals

Marat Nailevich Izmailov (Russian: Марат Наилевич Измайлов, Tatar: Марат Наил улы Измайлов; born 21 September 1982) is a Russian former professional footballer who played as a midfielder.

Izmailov spent most of his injury-plagued career at Lokomotiv Moscow with further spells in Portugal and briefly Azerbaijan. He represented Russia at the 2002 FIFA World Cup and two European Championships, earning 35 caps in 11 years.

== Personal life ==
The ancestors of Izmailov come from Nizhny Novgorod Oblast village Semyonovka (Семёновка).

== Club career ==
=== Lokomotiv ===
Born in Moscow of Volga Tatar descent, Izmailov emerged through local FC Lokomotiv Moscow's youth ranks, making a lightning progression in a period of six months. He was already a very important first-team member when Lokomotiv won the Russian Premier League titles in 2002 and 2004, and the player received the 2001 award for Best Young Player. However, early on, he also often suffered with injuries.

On 24 October 2001, Izmailov was one of the players who helped crush R.S.C. Anderlecht in Brussels, for the season's UEFA Champions League (5–1).

=== Sporting ===
In July 2007, Izmailov was loaned for one season to Sporting CP, making his official debut in the Supertaça Cândido de Oliveira on 11 August, against FC Porto in Leiria. The game ended 1–0, with the game's only goal being scored by him at the 75th minute, with a long-distance effort; he also played that match with an injury.

On 6 October 2007, coming from the bench, Izmailov contributed with two late goals (his first league ones) in a 3–0 home win against Vitória de Guimarães, and eventually helped the side finish second in the Primeira Liga, adding the Taça de Portugal also against Porto. During the following summer he signed a permanent deal with the Lisbon-based club, which paid Lokomotiv €4.5 million.

In 2009–10, Izmailov's physical problems resurfaced, and he would spend more than three months in the sidelines with a knee condition. He returned to training following coach Paulo Bento's dismissal, in late November 2009, but spent most of the following years on the sidelines nursing the same injury, and quarreling with Sporting's board of directors over the issue.

=== Porto ===
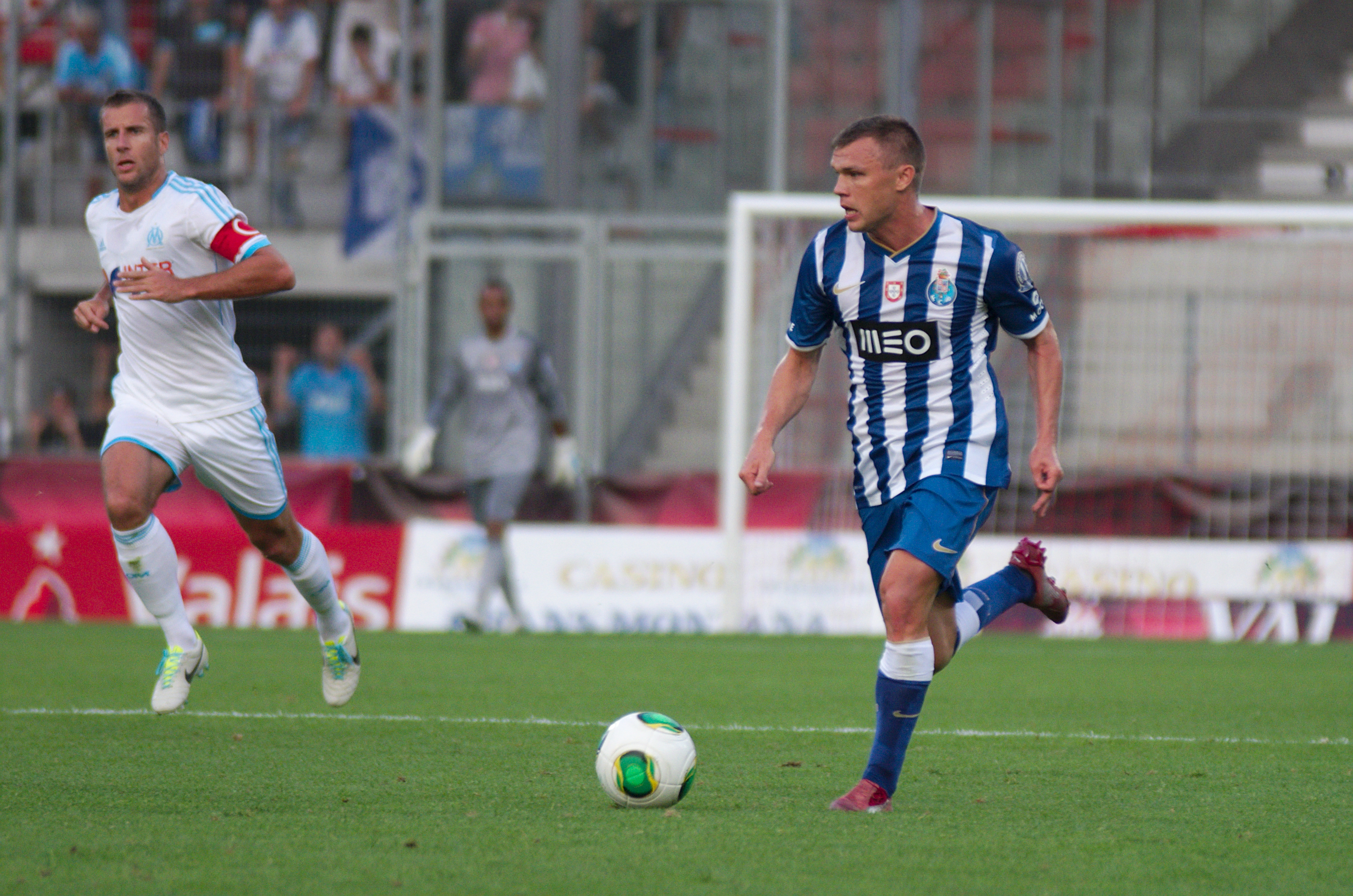
Izmailov in action for Porto against Marseille in a July 2013 friendly

On 7 January 2013, after passing the pertinent medicals, Izmailov joined Porto on a two-and-a-half-year contract, with Miguel Lopes moving in the opposite direction. He changed his jersey name from Izmailov to Izmaylov, and scored in only his second match, helping to a 2–0 home win over F.C. Paços de Ferreira.

On 31 January 2014, after spending four months in his country due to family reasons, Izmailov signed for Gabala FK in the Azerbaijan Premier League on loan until the end of the season, rejoining former Lokomotiv coach Yuri Semin who he worked with nine years ago. On 16 July he returned to his homeland and signed on loan for FC Krasnodar, which had the option of making the move permanent at the end of the campaign.

Izmailov scored his first goal in Russian football in seven years on 14 August 2014, netting his team's first in a 4–0 home win against FC Spartak Moscow. He left Porto at the end of his contract, in July 2015.

=== Krasnodar ===
On 20 July 2016, after one year out of football, 33-year-old Izmailov signed a one-year contract with Krasnodar with an extension option. On 15 March 2017, he and club parted ways by mutual consent.

=== Ararat Moscow ===
On 9 June 2017, Izmailov joined Russian Professional Football League club FC Ararat Moscow, where he shared teams with fellow former internationals Roman Pavlyuchenko and Aleksei Rebko. On 26 September, his contract was dissolved by mutual consent.

== International career ==
Izmailov made his debut with Russia aged just 19, and was summoned for the squads at the 2002 FIFA World Cup and UEFA Euro 2004, playing twice in each of those tournaments. On 25 May 2012, after an absence of six years, he was selected by manager Dick Advocaat for his Euro 2012 squad.

== Career statistics ==
=== Club ===
As of match played 18 August 2017

Club	Season	League		Cup		League Cup		Europe		Other		Total	
Club	Season	Apps	Goals	Apps	Goals	Apps	Goals	Apps	Goals	Apps	Goals	Apps	Goals
Lokomotiv-2 Moscow	2000	18	1	–		–		–		–		18	1
Lokomotiv-2 Moscow	Total	18	1	0	0	0	0	0	0	0	0	18	1
Lokomotiv Moscow	2001	29	6	3	0	–		11	3	–		43	9
Lokomotiv Moscow	2002	14	2	0	0	–		0	0	–		14	2
Lokomotiv Moscow	2003	27	5	2	0	0	0	10	0	1	0	40	5
Lokomotiv Moscow	2004	18	2	3	2	–		2	1	–		23	5
Lokomotiv Moscow	2005	16	4	0	0	–		5	0	1	0	22	4
Lokomotiv Moscow	2006	16	1	2	0	–		3	0	–		21	1
Lokomotiv Moscow	2007	4	0	0	0	–		0	0	–		4	0
Lokomotiv Moscow	Total	124	20	10	2	0	0	31	4	2	0	167	26
Sporting	2007–08	23	4	5	1	7	2	11	0	1	1	47	8
Sporting	2008–09	22	3	2	0	4	1	6	0	1	0	35	4
Sporting	2009–10	13	1	2	1	3	0	5	0	–		23	2
Sporting	2010–11	3	0	0	0	0	0	0	0	–		3	0
Sporting	2011–12	13	5	1	0	2	0	9	1	–		25	6
Sporting	2012–13	7	0	0	0	0	0	2	0	–		9	0
Sporting	Total	81	13	10	2	16	3	33	1	2	1	142	20
Porto	2012–13	13	1	0	0	1	0	1	0	0	0	15	1
Porto	2013–14	0	0	0	0	0	0	1	0	0	0	1	0
Porto	2014–15	0	0	0	0	0	0	0	0	0	0	0	0
Porto	Total	13	1	0	0	1	0	2	0	0	0	16	1
Gabala (loan)	2013–14	14	1	4	1	–		–		–		18	2
Gabala (loan)	Total	14	1	4	1	0	0	0	0	0	0	18	2
Krasnodar (loan)	2014–15	22	1	1	0	–		8	0	–		31	1
Krasnodar (loan)	Total	22	1	1	0	0	0	8	0	0	0	31	1
Krasnodar	2016–17	7	1	1	1	–		3	0	–		11	2
Krasnodar	Total	7	1	1	1	0	0	3	0	0	0	11	2
Ararat Moscow	2017–18	4	2	0	0	–		–		–		4	2
Ararat Moscow	Total	4	2	0	0	0	0	0	0	0	0	4	2
Career total		283	40	26	6	17	3	77	5	4	1	407	55

=== International ===
Appearances and goals by national team and year
National team	Year	Apps	Goals
Russia	2001	4	0
Russia	2002	6	0
Russia	2003	5	0
Russia	2004	5	1
Russia	2005	8	1
Russia	2006	3	0
Russia	2012	4	0
Total		35	2

Scores and results list Russia's goal tally first, score column indicates score after each Izmailov goal.

List of international goals scored by Marat Izmailov
No.	Date	Venue	Opponent	Score	Result	Competition
1	17 November 2004	Kuban Stadium, Krasnodar, Russia	Estonia	2–0	4–0	2006 FIFA World Cup qualification
2	8 October 2005	Lokomotiv Stadium, Moscow, Russia	Luxembourg	1–0	5–1	2006 FIFA World Cup qualification

== Honours ==
Lokomotiv

- Russian Premier League: 2002, 2004
- Russian Cup: 2000–01, 2006–07
- Russian Super Cup: 2003, 2005
- CIS Cup: 2005

Sporting CP

- Taça de Portugal: 2007–08; runner-up 2011–12
- Supertaça Cândido de Oliveira: 2007, 2008
- Taça da Liga runner-up 2007–08, 2008–09

Porto

- Primeira Liga: 2012–13
- Taça da Liga: Runner-up 2012–13

Gabala

- Azerbaijan Cup runner-up 2013–14

=== Individual ===
- Russian Premier League Best Young Player: 2001
