= 2013–14 FC Amkar Perm season =

Amkar Perm
2013–14 season
- Chairman: Gennady Shilov
- Manager: Stanislav Cherchesov till 8 April 201; Konstantin Paramonov caretaker from 8 April 2014
- Stadium: Zvezda Stadium
- Russian Premier League: 10th
- Russian Cup: Fifth Round vs Mordovia Saransk
- Top goalscorer: League: Georgi Peev (12); All: Georgi Peev (12)
- Highest home attendance: 15,700 vs Spartak Moscow; 26 August 2013
- Lowest home attendance: 6,400 vs Volga Nizhny Novgorod; 10 March 2014
- Average home league attendance: 10,647
Home colours	Away colours

The 2013–14 Amkar Perm season was their 10th season in the Russian Premier League, the highest tier of association football in Russia, following promotion during the 2003 season. They were knocked out of the Russian Cup at the Round of 32 stage by Mordovia Saransk.

== Squad ==
Note: Flags indicate national team as defined under FIFA eligibility rules; some limited exceptions apply. Players may hold more than one non-FIFA nationality.

No.	Pos.	Nation	Player
1	GK	RUS	Roman Gerus
3	DF	BUL	Petar Zanev
4	DF	RUS	Dzhamaldin Khodzhaniyazov (on loan from Zenit)
5	MF	POL	Janusz Gol
6	DF	RUS	Aleksei Nikitin
7	MF	BUL	Georgi Peev (vice-captain)
9	MF	BUL	Blagoy Georgiev
10	MF	RUS	Aleksei Rebko
14	DF	BUL	Zahari Sirakov
17	MF	EST	Konstantin Vassiljev
18	FW	RUS	Aleksei Kurzenyov
19	MF	RUS	Aleksandr Kolomeytsev
20	MF	RUS	Dmitri Kayumov (on loan from Spartak Moscow)
21	DF	RUS	Dmitri Belorukov (captain)
23	DF	RUS	Ivan Cherenchikov

No.	Pos.	Nation	Player
25	DF	POL	Damian Zbozień
26	FW	SVK	Martin Jakubko
30	DF	RUS	Soslan Takazov
31	DF	POL	Jakub Wawrzyniak
32	MF	NED	Gianluca Nijholt
42	GK	RUS	Sergei Narubin
45	DF	RUS	Andrei Pridyuk
50	DF	RUS	Mikhail Smirnov
70	FW	GHA	Patrick Twumasi (on loan from Spartaks Jūrmala)
83	FW	MDA	Igor Picusceac
87	FW	NGR	Fegor Ogude
93	MF	RUS	Ivan Solovyov (on loan from Zenit)
97	DF	FRA	Thomas Phibel
99	FW	RUS	Maksim Kanunnikov

== Transfers ==
=== Summer ===
In: Note: Flags indicate national team as defined under FIFA eligibility rules; some limited exceptions apply. Players may hold more than one non-FIFA nationality.

No.	Pos.	Nation	Player
3	DF	BUL	Petar Zanev (from (Ukraine) Volyn Lutsk)
5	DF	POL	Janusz Gol (from (Poland) Legia Warsaw)
20	MF	RUS	Dmitri Kayumov (on loan from (Russia) Spartak Moscow)
33	DF	RUS	Nikolai Fadeyev (on loan from (Russia) Spartak Moscow)
90	MF	RUS	Makhach Gadzhiyev (from (Ukraine) Tavriya Simferopol)
97	DF	FRA	Thomas Phibel (from (Poland) Widzew Łódź)

Out: Note: Flags indicate national team as defined under FIFA eligibility rules; some limited exceptions apply. Players may hold more than one non-FIFA nationality.

No.	Pos.	Nation	Player
2	MF	GRE	Nikolaos Karelis (to (Greece) Panathinaikos)
3	DF	SRB	Nikola Mijailović (to (Serbia) Red Star)
5	MF	RUS	Vitali Grishin (to (Russia) Khimki)
15	MF	SRB	Predrag Mijić (released)
18	FW	RUS	Nikita Burmistrov (end of loan from (Russia) Anzhi Makhachkala)
27	MF	RUS	Vadim Gagloyev (to (Russia) Mordovia Saransk)
50	DF	RUS	Mikhail Smirnov (on loan to (Russia) Neftekhimik Nizhnekamsk)
60	FW	RUS	Pavel Shuvalov (to (Russia) Spartak Kostroma)
63	FW	RUS	Stanislav Matyash (to (Russia) Dynamo St. Petersburg)
73	DF	RUS	Brian Idowu (loan to (Russia) Dynamo St. Petersburg)
94	DF	RUS	Anton Smetanin (to (Russia) Oktan Perm)

=== Winter ===
In: Note: Flags indicate national team as defined under FIFA eligibility rules; some limited exceptions apply. Players may hold more than one non-FIFA nationality.

No.	Pos.	Nation	Player
4	DF	RUS	Dzhamaldin Khodzhaniyazov (loan from (Russia) Zenit St.Petersburg)
6	DF	RUS	Aleksei Nikitin (from (Russia) Yenisey Krasnoyarsk)
18	FW	RUS	Aleksei Kurzenyov (from (Russia) CSKA Moscow)
25	DF	POL	Damian Zbozień (from (Poland) Piast Gliwice)
30	DF	RUS	Soslan Takazov (from (Russia) Alania Vladikavkaz)
31	DF	POL	Jakub Wawrzyniak (from (Poland) Legia Warsaw)
70	FW	GHA	Patrick Twumasi (loan from (Latvia) Spartaks Jūrmala)
87	FW	NGR	Fegor Ogude (from (Norway) Vålerenga)
93	MF	RUS	Ivan Solovyov (loan from (Russia) Zenit St.Petersburg)

Out: Note: Flags indicate national team as defined under FIFA eligibility rules; some limited exceptions apply. Players may hold more than one non-FIFA nationality.

No.	Pos.	Nation	Player
13	DF	MNE	Mitar Novaković (to (Serbia) OFK Beograd)
15	FW	LAT	Vladimirs Kamešs (loan to (Russia) Neftekhimik Nizhnekamsk)
22	DF	RUS	Andrei Semyonov (to (Russia) Terek Grozny)
66	MF	RUS	Artur Ryabokobylenko (loan to (Russia) Spartak Nalchik)
85	MF	SVK	Michal Breznaník
90	MF	RUS	Makhach Gadzhiyev (to (Russia) Anzhi Makhachkala)

== Competitions ==
=== Russian Premier League ===
==== Matches ====
16 July 2013 1	Amkar Perm	2 – 0	Tom Tomsk	Perm
19:00 YET (UTC+6)	Peev 2' (pen.), 10' (pen.)	Summary	Rykov (yellow card) 1' (yellow-red card) 9'	Stadium: Zvezda Stadium; Attendance: 12,250; Referee: Aleksey Eskov

20 July 2013 2	Terek Grozny	1 – 1	Amkar Perm	Grozny
23:00 YET (UTC+6)	Lebedenko 13'	Summary	Jakubko 55'	Stadium: Terek Stadium; Attendance: 13,375; Referee: Vladimir Kazmenko

29 July 2013 3	Krasnodar	2 – 1	Amkar Perm	Krasnodar
22:00 YET (UTC+6)	Joãozinho 47' (pen.); Abreu 49'	Summary	Jakubko 29'	Stadium: Kuban Stadium; Attendance: 9,700; Referee: Mikhail Vilkov

4 August 2013 4	Amkar Perm	0 – 0	Krylia Sovetov Samara	Perm
18:00 YET (UTC+6)		Summary		Stadium: Zvezda Stadium; Attendance: 12,300; Referee: Alexey Nikolaev

17 August 2013 5	Ural	0 – 0	Amkar Perm	Central Stadium
15:30 YET (UTC+6)		Summary		Stadium: Yekaterinburg; Attendance: 21,323; Referee: Sergey Kostevich

26 August 2013 6	Amkar Perm	2 – 1	Spartak Moscow	Perm
19:45 YET (UTC+6)	Peev 17'; Jakubko 67'	Summary	Yakovlev 49'; Insaurralde (yellow card) 20' (yellow-red card) 87'	Stadium: Zvezda Stadium; Attendance: 15,700; Referee: Vladislav Bezborodov

30 August 2013 7	CSKA Moscow	2 – 1	Amkar Perm	Moscow
22:00 YET (UTC+6)	Doumbia 23'; Musa 77'	Summary	Peev 1'	Stadium: Arena Khimki; Attendance: 7,000; Referee: Sergey Lapochkin

15 September 2013 8	Amkar Perm	0 – 0	Rubin Kazan	Perm
20:00 YET (UTC+6)	Semyonov (yellow card) 59' (yellow-red card) 84'	Summary		Stadium: Zvezda Stadium; Attendance: 12,700; Referee: Aleksandr Egorov

22 September 2013 9	Kuban Krasnodar	0 – 3	Amkar Perm	Krasnodar
20:15 YET (UTC+6)		Summary	Georgiev 8'; Jakubko 14'; Peev 16' (pen.)	Stadium: Kuban Stadium; Attendance: 15,282; Referee: Mikhail Vilkov

26 September 2013 10	Amkar Perm	1 – 0	Rostov	Perm
19:00 YET (UTC+6)	Dyakov 13' (o.g.)	Summary		Stadium: Zvezda Stadium; Attendance: 10,750; Referee: Mikhail Belov

29 September 2013 11	Anzhi Makhachkala	2 – 2	Amkar Perm	Kaspiysk
22:15 YET (UTC+6)	Gatagov 44' (pen.); Solomatin 90'	Summary	Semyonov (yellow card) 43' (yellow-red card) 61'; Kanunnikov 65'; Picusceac 88'	Stadium: Anzhi-Arena; Attendance: 12,127; Referee: Timur Arslanbekov

4 October 2013 12	Volga Nizhny Novgorod	0 – 2	Amkar Perm	Lokomotiv Stadium
21:00 YET (UTC+6)		Summary	Peev 44' (pen.), 56' (pen.)	Stadium: Nizhny Novgorod; Attendance: 3,000; Referee: Aleksei Matyunin

21 October 2013 13	Lokomotiv Moscow	4 – 0	Amkar Perm	Moscow
21:00 YET (UTC+6)	N'Doye 7'; Maicon 39'; Shishkin 57'; Pavlyuchenko 86'	Report		Stadium: Lokomotiv Stadium; Attendance: 7,146; Referee: Aleksandr Yegorov

26 October 2013 14	Amkar Perm	2 – 1	Dynamo Moscow	Perm
16:45 YET (UTC+6)	Vassiljev 23'; Belorukov 31'	Summary	Noboa 62'	Stadium: Zvezda Stadium; Attendance: 9,500; Referee: Sergey Kuznetsov

2 November 2013 15	Zenit St. Petersburg	1 – 1	Amkar Perm	Saint Petersburg
20:30 YET (UTC+6)	Danny 38'	Summary	Phibel 26'	Stadium: Petrovsky Stadium; Attendance: 18,734; Referee: Sergey Karasev

10 November 2013 16	Amkar Perm	1 – 0	Anzhi Makhachkala	Perm
16:00 YET (UTC+6)	Belorukov 82'	Summary		Stadium: Zvezda Stadium; Attendance: 9,700; Referee: Sergei Ivanov

23 November 2013 17	Amkar Perm	3 – 1	Kuban Krasnodar	Perm
16:45 YET (UTC+6)	Picușceac 77'; Cherenchikov 82'; Peev 86' (pen.)	Summary	Dealbert 27'	Stadium: Zvezda Stadium; Attendance: 9,200; Referee: Vitaly Meshkov

2 December 2013 18	Rubin Kazan	3 – 0	Amkar Perm	Kazan
21:30 YET (UTC+6)	Natcho 38'; Rondón 68'; Kuzmin 77'	Summary		Stadium: Central Stadium; Attendance: 3,073; Referee: Aleksey Eskov

8 December 2013 19	Dynamo Moscow	2 – 0	Amkar Perm	Moscow
18:00 YET (UTC+6)	Kurányi 57', 78' (pen.)	Summary		Stadium: Arena Khimki; Attendance: 5,000; Referee: Alexey Nikolaev

10 March 2014 20	Amkar Perm	5 – 1	Volga Nizhny Novgorod	Perm
16:00 YET (UTC+6)	Ogude 4', 79'; Peev 37' (pen.); Kanunnikov 88'; Kowalczyk 89' (pen.)	Summary	Shelton 31'	Stadium: Zvezda Stadium; Attendance: 6,400; Referee: Sergei Ivanov

16 March 2014 21	Amkar Perm	0 – 0	Lokomotiv Moscow	Perm
15:30 YET (UTC+6)		Report		Stadium: Zvezda Stadium; Attendance: 11,800; Referee: Vladislav Bezborodov

21 March 2014 22	Rostov	2 – 2	Amkar Perm	Rostov-on-Don
21:00 YET (UTC+6)	Kalachev 18'; Dzyuba 88'; Dyakov 90'	Summary	Wawrzyniak 4'; Ogude 28'; Kolomeytsev 49'; Wawrzyniak (yellow card) 57' (yellow-red card) 72'	Stadium: Olimp – 2 Attendance: 9,000; Referee: Aleksey Eskov

29 March 2104 23	Amkar Perm	1 – 2	Zenit St.Petersburg	Perm
18:00 YET (UTC+6)	Kanunnikov 18'	Summary	Criscito 49'; Kerzhakov 54'	Stadium: Zvezda Stadium; Attendance: 15,500; Referee: Vitaly Meshkov

5 April 2014 24	Amkar Perm	0 – 1	Terek Grozny	Perm
17:00 YET (UTC+6)		Summary	Ivanov 42'	Stadium: Zvezda Stadium; Attendance: 7,500; Referee: Vyacheslav Kharlamov

12 April 2014 25	Tom Tomsk	0 – 0	Amkar Perm	Tomsk
14:00 YET (UTC+6)		Summary		Stadium: Trud Stadium; Attendance: 3,200; Referee: Alexey Nikolaev

18 April 2014 26	Amkar Perm	0 – 2	Ural	Perm
19:00 YET (UTC+6)		Summary	Manucharyan 67'; Khozin 83'	Stadium: Zvezda Stadium; Attendance: 8,300; Referee: Sergei Ivanov

25 April 2014 27	Krylia Sovetov Samara	2 – 2	Amkar Perm	Samara
21:00 YET (UTC+6)	Kornilenko 65'; Delkin 71'	Summary	Peev 20', 77' (pen.)	Stadium: Metallurg Stadium; Attendance: 9,000; Referee: Vladislav Bezborodov

2 May 2014 28	Amkar Perm	1 – 3	CSKA Moscow	Perm
16:00 YET (UTC+6)	Peev 45'	Summary	Dzagoev 39'; Tošić 55'; Doumbia 82'	Stadium: Zvezda Stadium; Attendance: 10,000; Referee: Sergey Lapochkin

10 May 2014 29	Spartak Moscow	1 – 0	Amkar Perm	Moscow
19:45 YET (UTC+6)	Movsisyan 31'	Summary	Wawrzyniak (yellow card) 55' (yellow-red card) 90+1'	Stadium: Lokomotiv Stadium; Attendance: 5,896; Referee: Kirill Levnikov

15 May 2013 30	Amkar Perm	2 – 2	Krasnodar	Perm
20:30 YET (UTC+6)	Vassiljev 20'; Picusceac 64'	Summary	Pereyra 25'; Petrov 55'	Stadium: Zvezda Stadium; Attendance: 8,100; Referee: Aleksandr Egorov

==== Table ====
Pos	Team	Pld	W	D	L	GF	GA	GD	Pts
8	Kuban Krasnodar	30	10	8	12	40	42	−2	38
9	Rubin Kazan	30	9	11	10	36	30	+6	38 (Note: Rubin Kazan ahead of Amkar Perm on head-to-head points; Rubin Kazan–Amkar Perm 3–0, Amkar Perm–Rubin Kazan 0–0.)
10	Amkar Perm	30	9	11	10	36	37	−1	38
11	Ural Sverdlovsk Oblast	30	9	7	14	28	46	−18	34
12	Terek Grozny	30	8	9	13	27	33	−6	33

Source: Russian Premier League
Rules for classification: 1) points; 2) number of wins; 3) head-to-head points; 4) number of head-to-head wins; 5) head-to-head goal difference; 6) number of head-to-head goals scored; 7) number of head-to-head away goals scored; 8) goal difference; 9) number of goals scored; 10) number of away goals scored; 11) position in the 2012–13 season (only used until all the regularly scheduled games have been played); 11) extra play-off game or tournament between the teams in question.

=== Russian Cup ===
30 October 2013 Fifth Round	Mordovia Saransk	2-2 (a.e.t.) (4–3 p)	Amkar Perm	Saransk
20:30 YET (UTC+6)	Perendija 53'; Dimidko 57'	Summary	Nijholt 19'; Kayumov 50'	Stadium: Start Stadium; Attendance: 3,100; Referee: Vyacheslav Kharlamov
	Penalties
	Budnikov (penalty scored); Pazin (penalty missed); Ivanov (penalty scored); Dimidko (penalty scored); Bobyor (penalty scored)		Peev (penalty missed); Vassiljev (penalty scored); Gol (penalty scored); Sirakov (penalty scored); Georgiev (penalty missed)

== Squad statistics ==
As of Match played 15 May 2014

=== Appearances and goals ===
No.	Pos	Nat	Player	Total		Premier League		Russian Cup	
No.	Pos	Nat	Player	Apps	Goals	Apps	Goals	Apps	Goals
1	GK	(Russia) RUS	Roman Gerus	9	0	7+1	0	1	0
3	DF	(Bulgaria) BUL	Petar Zanev	15	0	15	0	0	0
4	DF	(Russia) RUS	Dzhamaldin Khodzhaniyazov	1	0	0+1	0	0	0
5	MF	(Poland) POL	Janusz Gol	28	0	27	0	1	0
6	DF	(Russia) RUS	Aleksei Nikitin	7	0	6+1	0	0	0
7	MF	(Bulgaria) BUL	Georgi Peev	28	12	26+1	12	1	0
9	MF	(Bulgaria) BUL	Blagoy Georgiev	24	2	23	1	1	1
10	MF	(Russia) RUS	Aleksei Rebko	1	0	1	0	0	0
14	DF	(Bulgaria) BUL	Zahari Sirakov	21	0	18+2	0	1	0
17	MF	(Estonia) EST	Konstantin Vassiljev	20	1	14+5	1	1	0
18	FW	(Russia) RUS	Aleksei Kurzenyov	3	0	1+2	0	0	0
19	MF	(Russia) RUS	Aleksandr Kolomeytsev	25	2	23+1	2	1	0
20	MF	(Russia) RUS	Dmitri Kayumov	8	1	1+6	0	1	1
21	DF	(Russia) RUS	Dmitri Belorukov	27	2	26	2	1	0
23	DF	(Russia) RUS	Ivan Cherenchikov	13	1	11+2	1	0	0
25	DF	(Poland) POL	Damian Zbozień	4	0	3+1	0	0	0
26	FW	(Slovakia) SVK	Martin Jakubko	20	4	18+2	4	0	0
31	DF	(Poland) POL	Jakub Wawrzyniak	9	1	9	1	0	0
32	MF	(Netherlands) NED	Gianluca Nijholt	6	0	0+5	0	1	0
42	GK	(Russia) RUS	Sergei Narubin	23	0	23	0	0	0
45	DF	(Russia) RUS	Andrei Pridyuk	2	0	1+1	0	0	0
70	FW	(Ghana) GHA	Patrick Twumasi	6	0	3+3	0	0	0
83	FW	(Moldova) MDA	Igor Picusceac	14	3	6+8	3	0	0
87	FW	(Nigeria) NGR	Fegor Ogude	9	3	9	3	0	0
93	MF	(Russia) RUS	Ivan Solovyov	3	0	0+3	0	0	0
97	DF	(France) FRA	Thomas Phibel	19	1	19	1	0	0
99	FW	(Russia) RUS	Maksim Kanunnikov	23	3	17+6	3	0	0
Players who left Amkar Perm on loan:
15	FW	(Latvia) LAT	Vladimirs Kamešs	8	0	0+7	0	1	0
66	MF	(Russia) RUS	Artur Ryabokobylenko	8	0	1+6	0	1	0
Players who left Amkar Perm during the season:
18	FW	(Russia) RUS	Nikita Burmistrov	3	0	2+1	0	0	0
22	DF	(Russia) RUS	Andrei Semyonov	14	0	12+1	0	1	0
33	DF	(Russia) RUS	Nikolai Fadeyev	2	0	0+1	0	1	0
85	MF	(Slovakia) SVK	Michal Breznaník	1	0	0+1	0	0	0
90	MF	(Russia) RUS	Makhach Gadzhiyev	10	0	8+2	0	0	0

=== Top scorers ===
Place	Position	Nation	Number	Name	Premier League	Russian Cup	Total
1	MF	(Bulgaria)	7	Georgi Peev	12	0	12
2	FW	(Slovakia)	26	Martin Jakubko	4	0	4
3	FW	(Russia)	99	Maksim Kanunnikov	3	0	3
3	FW	(Nigeria)	87	Fegor Ogude	3	0	3
3	FW	(Moldova)	83	Igor Picusceac	3	0	3
3	DF	(Russia)	21	Dmitri Belorukov	2	1	3
7	MF	(Russia)	19	Aleksandr Kolomeytsev	2	0	2
7				Own goal	2	0	2
9	DF	(Russia)	23	Ivan Cherenchikov	1	0	1
9	MF	(Bulgaria)	9	Blagoy Georgiev	1	0	1
9	DF	(France)	97	Thomas Phibel	1	0	1
9	DF	(Poland)	31	Jakub Wawrzyniak	1	0	1
9	MF	(Estonia)	17	Konstantin Vassiljev	1	0	1
9	MF	(Russia)	20	Dmitri Kayumov	0	1	1
				TOTALS	36	2	38

=== Disciplinary record ===
Number	Nation	Position	Name	Russian Premier League		Russian Cup		Total	
Number	Nation	Position	Name	Yellow card	Red card	Yellow card	Red card	Yellow card	Red card
3	(Bulgaria)	DF	Petar Zanev	1	0	0	0	3	0
5	(Poland)	MF	Janusz Gol	5	0	1	0	6	0
7	(Bulgaria)	MF	Georgi Peev	2	0	0	0	2	0
9	(Bulgaria)	MF	Blagoy Georgiev	8	0	1	0	9	0
14	(Bulgaria)	DF	Zahari Sirakov	5	0	0	0	5	0
15	(Latvia)	FW	Vladimirs Kamešs	1	0	0	0	1	0
18	(Russia)	FW	Aleksei Kurzenyov	1	0	0	0	1	0
19	(Russia)	MF	Aleksandr Kolomeytsev	2	0	0	0	2	0
20	(Russia)	MF	Dmitri Kayumov	1	0	0	0	1	0
21	(Russia)	DF	Dmitri Belorukov	5	0	0	0	5	0
22	(Russia)	DF	Andrei Semyonov	5	2	1	0	6	2
23	(Russia)	DF	Ivan Cherenchikov	5	0	0	0	5	0
26	(Slovakia)	FW	Martin Jakubko	3	0	0	0	3	0
31	(Poland)	DF	Jakub Wawrzyniak	7	2	0	0	7	2
33	(Russia)	DF	Nikolai Fadeyev	0	0	1	0	1	0
42	(Russia)	GK	Sergei Narubin	1	0	0	0	1	0
66	(Russia)	MF	Artur Ryabokobylenko	2	0	0	0	2	0
70	(Ghana)	FW	Patrick Twumasi	2	0	0	0	2	0
87	(Nigeria)	FW	Fegor Ogude	4	0	0	0	4	0
97	(France)	DF	Thomas Phibel	7	0	0	0	7	0
99	(Russia)	FW	Maksim Kanunnikov	2	0	0	0	2	0
			TOTALS	71	4	4	0	75	4
