= Katsalapov =

Katsalapov (Russian: Кацалапов) is a Russian masculine surname, its feminine counterpart is Katsalapova. Notable people with the surname include:

- Aleksandr Katsalapov (born 1986), Russian football player
- Nikita Katsalapov (born 1991), Russian ice dancer
