= Mikhail Popov (footballer) =

Russian footballer (born 1985)

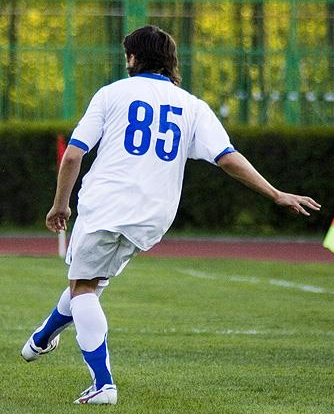
- Popov in action for FC Baltika

Personal information
- Full name: Mikhail Yuryevich Popov
- Date of birth: 25 September 1985 (age 41)
- Place of birth: Moscow, Russian SFSR
- Height: 1.85 m (6 ft 1 in)
- Position: Defender

Youth career
- Spartak-2 Moscow

Senior career*
Years	Team	Apps	(Gls)
2002–2004	FC Spartak-Avto Moscow		
2005	Presnya Moscow	13	(0)
2006–2007	Dinaburg	40	(0)
2008–2012	Baltika Kaliningrad	120	(3)
2012–2013	Ufa	26	(2)
2013–2015	SKA-Energiya Khabarovsk	80	(3)
2016	Solyaris Moscow	3	(0)
2016–2017	Luch-Energiya Vladivostok	37	(0)
2017–2018	Ararat Moscow	15	(1)
2019	FC Ararat-2 Moscow		
- * Club domestic league appearances and goals

Mikhail Yuryevich Popov (Russian: Михаил Юрьевич Попов; born 25 September 1985) is a Russian former footballer.

== Club career ==
He played 9 seasons in the Russian Football National League for 4 different clubs.
