= Damir Tregulov =

Russian footballer

Personal information
- Full name: Damir Ksyainovich Tregulov
- Date of birth: 7 November 1998 (age 28)
- Place of birth: Moscow, Russia
- Height: 1.90 m (6 ft 3 in)
- Positions: Forward; midfielder

Team information
- Current team: FC Amkal Moscow
- Number: 3

Youth career
- –2015: FC Torpedo Moscow
- 2016: FC Solyaris Moscow

Senior career*
Years	Team	Apps	(Gls)
2016–2017	FC Solyaris Moscow	8	(3)
2017–2019	FC Torpedo Moscow	46	(9)
2019–2020	FC Tekstilshchik Ivanovo	12	(0)
2020–2021	FC Metallurg Vidnoye	13	(1)
2022	FC Rosich Moscow oblast (amateur)		
2023	FC Dengi Moscow (amateur)		
2024	FC Match Moscow (amateur)		
2024–	FC Amkal Moscow (amateur)		
- * Club domestic league appearances and goals as of 20 August 2024

Damir Ksyainovich Tregulov (Russian: Дамир Ксяинович Трегулов; born 7 November 1998) is a Russian football player. He plays for amateur club Amkal Moscow.

== Club career ==
He was raised in the FC Torpedo Moscow academy, with which he won the Moscow Cup (scoring two goals in the final) and Russian Cup for the born-in-1998 team.

He made his debut in the Russian Professional Football League for FC Solyaris Moscow on 2 September 2016 in a game against FC Pskov-747 at the age of 17.

He won zone Center of the Russian Professional Football League with FC Torpedo Moscow in the 2018–19 season.

He made his Russian Football National League debut for FC Tekstilshchik Ivanovo on 28 July 2019 in a game against FC Tom Tomsk at the age of 20.
