= Samylin =

Samylin is a Russian surname. Notable people with the surname include:

- Aleksei Samylin (born 1997), Russian football player
- Yaroslav Samylin (born 1997), Russian politician

== See also ==
- Samhain
