= Ivanteyevka, Moscow Oblast =

Town in Moscow Oblast, Russia

Ivanteyevka Ивантеевка
- Town
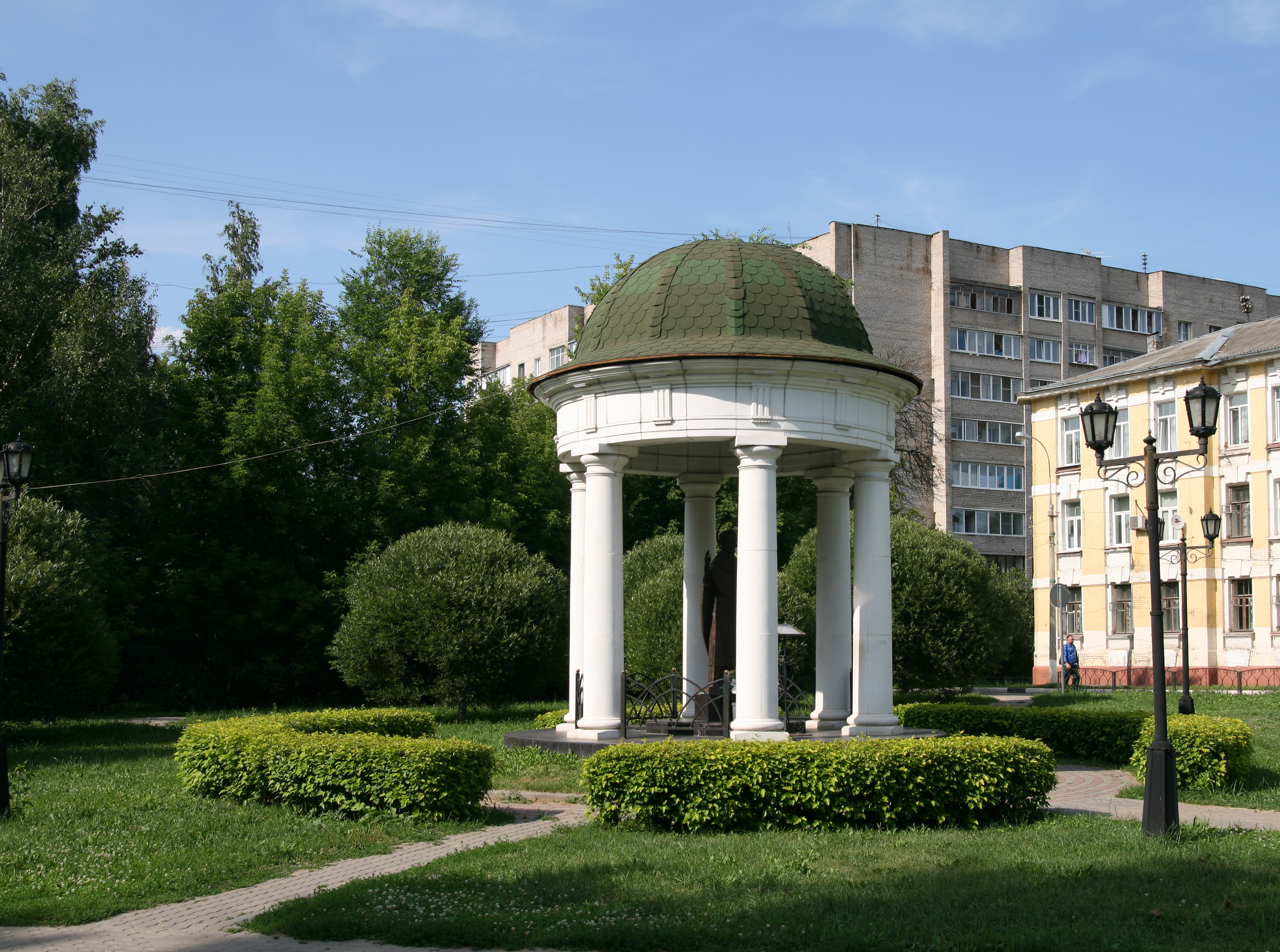
- Saint Nicholas Monument

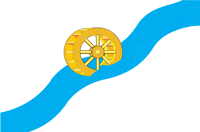
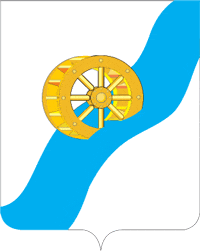
- Flag Coat of arms
- Interactive map of Ivanteyevka
- Location of Ivanteyevka Ivanteyevka (Moscow Oblast)
- Coordinates: 55°59′N 37°56′E
- Country: Russia
- Federal subject: Moscow Oblast
- Founded: 1586
- Town status since: 1938
- Elevation: 150 m (490 ft)

Population (2010 Census)
  - Total: 58,626
  - Estimate (2025): 84,203 (+43.6%)
  - Rank: 282nd in 2010

Administrative status
  - Subordinated to: Ivanteyevka Town Under Oblast Jurisdiction
  - Capital of: Ivanteyevka Town Under Oblast Jurisdiction

Municipal status
  - Urban okrug: Ivanteyevka Urban Okrug
  - Capital of: Ivanteyevka Urban Okrug
- Time zone: UTC+3 (MSK)
- Postal code: 141280–141284
- OKTMO ID: 46758000006
- Website: www.ivanteevka.org

Ivanteyevka (Russian: Иванте́евка) is a town in Moscow Oblast, Russia, located on the Ucha River 20 kilometers (12 mi) northeast of Moscow. Population: 82,827 (2021 census); 58,626 (2010 census); 51,454 (2002 census); 53,140 (1989 Soviet census).

== History ==
Ivanteyevka was founded in 1586 as a settlement of Vanteyevo (Ванте́ево), which belonged to the Trinity Lavra of St. Sergius. It was granted town status in 1938.

== Politics ==
For 18 years, from 1991 to 2009, the city of Ivanteevka was led by Yelena Vasilyevna Sukhanova. In 1990, she was elected chairman of the Ivanteyevka City Council of Deputies. In November 1991, elections of heads of local administration were to be held (based on the Law "On Elections of the Head of Administration" of 24 October 1991). However, in November 1991, it was decided that the heads of the local administration would be appointed by the corresponding head of the higher administration (in accordance with the resolution of the Fifth (extraordinary) Congress of People's Deputies of the Russian Federation dated 1 November 1991 "On the organization of executive power during the period of radical economic reform" and the Decree of the President of the Russian Federation dated 25 November 1991 adopted on its basis "On the procedure for appointing heads of administration"). Thus, in December 1991, the head of the administration of the Pushkin district appointed Yelena Sukhanova to the post of head of the administration of the city of Ivanteyevka (which was then part of the Pushkin district). In 1996, Sukhanova was elected head of the city, and was re-elected again in 2000 and 2003 (in 2003 - 63.04% of the votes with a turnout of 51.00%). Sukhanova heads the local branch of the United Russia party.

In March 2009, Sukhanova was elected to the city Council of Deputies, becoming the chairman of the Council.

In the elections of the head of the city in March 2009, Sergei Gennadyevich Gridnev (United Russia) won, receiving 44.40% of the vote. The Council of Deputies of the city of Ivanteyevka of the fourth convocation was also elected. Voter turnout in this election was 37%. In 2014, in the elections of the Head of the city, more than 73% of voters voted for Gridnev.

From December 2016 to November 2018, the head of the city was Yelena Vladimirovna Kovaleva (United Russia).

From 27 December 2018 to 3 December 2020, the head of the city was Maxim Valeryevich Krasnotsvetov (United Russia).

== Administrative and municipal status ==
Within the framework of administrative divisions, it is incorporated as Ivanteyevka Town Under Oblast Jurisdiction—an administrative unit with the status equal to that of the districts. As a municipal division, Ivanteyevka Town Under Oblast Jurisdiction is incorporated as Ivanteyevka Urban Okrug.

== Notable people ==
- Ivan Mamakhanov, Armenian football player
