= Artyom Voronkin =

Russian footballer

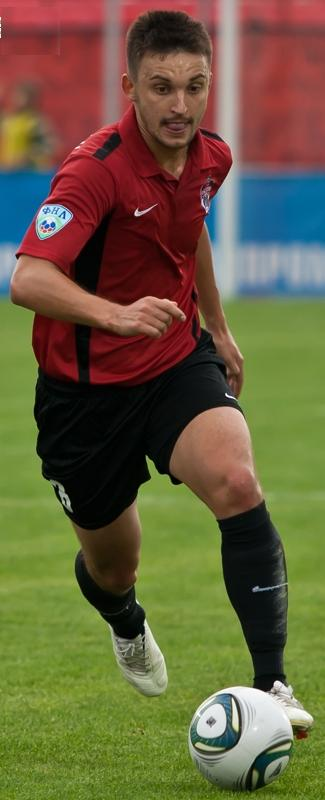
- Voronkin with Khimki in 2011

Personal information
- Full name: Artyom Anatolyevich Voronkin
- Date of birth: 19 February 1986 (age 40)
- Place of birth: Rostov Oblast, Russian SFSR
- Height: 1.84 m (6 ft 1/2 in)
- Position: Midfielder

Youth career
- FC Titan Moscow

Senior career*
Years	Team	Apps	(Gls)
2003	FC Titan Moscow	2	(0)
2004–2005	FC Lokomotiv Moscow	0	(0)
2005	FC Lokomotiv Kaluga	12	(0)
2005	→ FC Zhenis (loan)	8	(1)
2006	FC Chernomorets Novorossiysk	28	(1)
2007	FC Avangard Kursk	40	(2)
2008	FC Terek Grozny	9	(0)
2009	FC Terek Grozny	0	(0)
2010	FC Luch-Energiya Vladivostok	19	(0)
2011–2013	FC Khimki	40	(8)
2013	FC SKA-Energiya Khabarovsk	11	(1)
2013–2014	FC Gazovik Orenburg	12	(0)
2015	FC Sakhalin Yuzhno-Sakhalinsk	4	(0)
2015	FC Torpedo Armavir	19	(1)
2016	FC SKA-Khabarovsk	20	(0)
2017	FC Neftekhimik Nizhnekamsk	10	(1)
2017–2018	FC Ararat Moscow	22	(0)
2018–2020	FC Urozhay Krasnodar	38	(2)
- * Club domestic league appearances and goals

Artyom Anatolyevich Voronkin (Russian: Артём Анатольевич Воронкин; born 19 February 1986) is a Russian former footballer.

== Career ==
He made his Russian Premier League debut for FC Terek Grozny on 14 March 2008 in a game against PFC Krylia Sovetov Samara.

In March 2015, Voronkin signed for FC Sakhalin Yuzhno-Sakhalinsk.
