= Viktor Zemchenkov =

Russian footballer

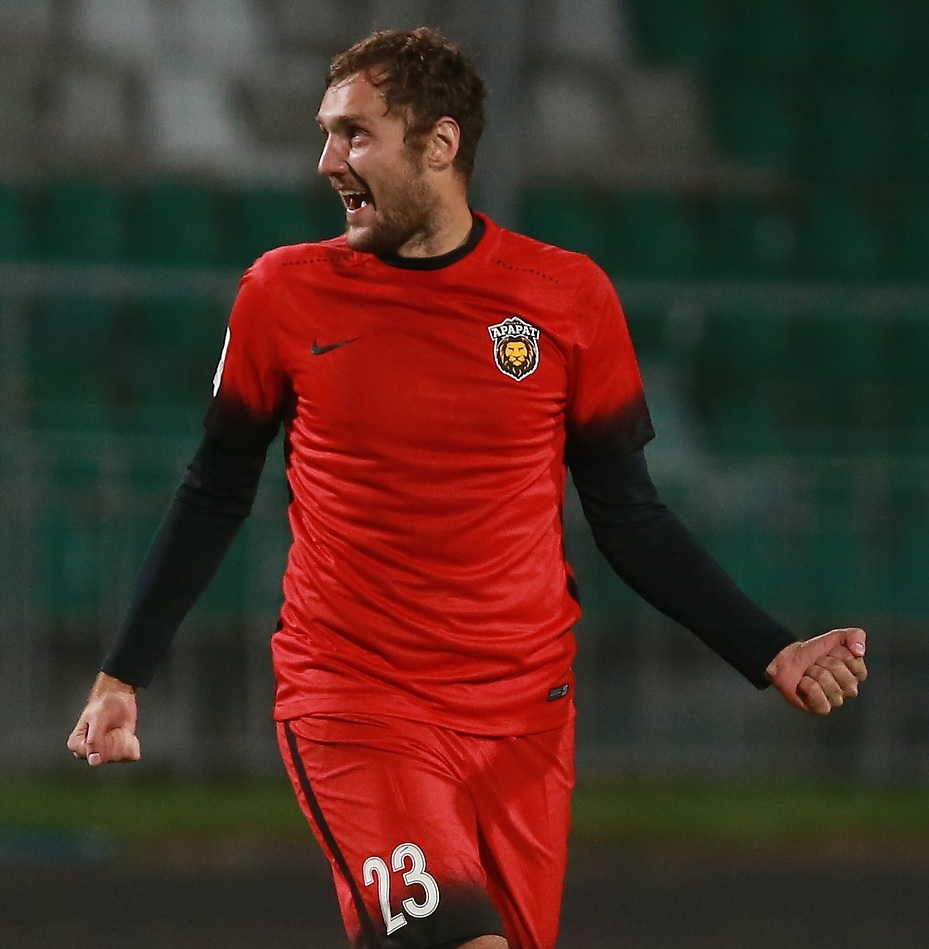
- Zemchenkov with Ararat Moscow in 2017

Personal information
- Full name: Viktor Nikolayevich Zemchenkov
- Date of birth: 15 September 1986 (age 40)
- Place of birth: Moscow, Russian SFSR
- Height: 1.91 m (6 ft 3 in)
- Position: Forward

Youth career
- –2003: FC Torpedo-Metallurg Moscow

Senior career*
Years	Team	Apps	(Gls)
2004–2006	FC Moscow	0	(0)
2006	FC Kuban Krasnodar	2	(0)
2007	FC Torpedo Moscow	21	(7)
2008–2009	FC Terek Grozny	11	(1)
2009	→ FC Nizhny Novgorod (loan)	30	(5)
2010	FC Baltika Kaliningrad	1	(0)
2010	FC Tyumen	24	(11)
2011	FC Khimki	18	(2)
2011–2012	FC Chernomorets Novorossiysk	21	(6)
2012–2013	FC Luch-Energiya Vladivostok	12	(4)
2013–2015	FC Khimki	39	(14)
2015–2016	FC Baltika Kaliningrad	28	(2)
2016–2017	FC Solyaris Moscow	18	(4)
2017	FC Ararat Moscow	17	(4)
2017–2019	FC Zvezda Serpukhov (amateur)		
2019–2020	FC Zorky Krasnogorsk	15	(3)
- * Club domestic league appearances and goals

Viktor Nikolayevich Zemchenkov (Russian: Виктор Николаевич Земченков; born 15 September 1986) is a Russian former footballer.

== Club career ==
He made his Russian Premier League debut for FC Terek Grozny on 14 March 2008 in a game against PFC Krylia Sovetov Samara.
