= Aleksei Samylin =

Russian footballer

Personal information
- Full name: Aleksei Dmitriyevich Samylin
- Date of birth: 15 October 1997 (age 29)
- Place of birth: Moscow, Russia
- Height: 1.74 m (5 ft 9 in)
- Position: Defender

Team information
- Current team: FC Amkal Moscow

Youth career
- –2015: FC Lokomotiv-2 Moscow

Senior career*
Years	Team	Apps	(Gls)
2015–2016	FC Prialit Reutov		
2016–2017	FC Khimki-M (amateur)		
2017–2018	FC Khimki	0	(0)
2018	FC Ararat Moscow	6	(0)
2018	FC Prialit Reutov		
2019	FC Ararat-2 Moscow		
2019–2020	FC Zorky Krasnogorsk	13	(3)
2020–2021	FC Kolomna	24	(1)
2021–2023	FC Veles Moscow	10	(0)
2022	→ FC Saturn Ramenskoye (loan)	16	(2)
2023–2024	FC Tekstilshchik Ivanovo	36	(1)
2025–	FC Amkal Moscow	0	(0)
- * Club domestic league appearances and goals as of 17 November 2024

Aleksei Dmitriyevich Samylin (Russian: Алексей Дмитриевич Самылин; born 15 October 1997) is a Russian football player who plays for FC Amkal Moscow.

== Club career ==
He made his debut in the Russian Football National League for FC Veles Moscow on 10 July 2021 in a game against FC Yenisey Krasnoyarsk.
