= Konstantin Morozov =

Russian footballer

Personal information
- Full name: Konstantin Valeryevich Morozov
- Date of birth: 13 May 1992 (age 34)
- Place of birth: Vyshny Volochyok, Russia
- Height: 1.81 m (5 ft 11 in)
- Position: Right back

Youth career
- 2009: Khimki

Senior career*
Years	Team	Apps	(Gls)
2010	Rubin-2 Kazan	24	(0)
2012–2013	Biolog-Novokubansk	12	(0)
2013	Rus Saint Petersburg	16	(0)
2014–2015	Ulisses	25	(0)
2015	Torpedo Armavir	18	(0)
2016	Yenisey Krasnoyarsk	3	(0)
2017	Sochi	12	(1)
2017	Ararat Moscow	4	(0)
2018	Alashkert	4	(0)
2018	Veles Moscow	13	(0)
2019	Ararat Moscow (amateur)		
2019–2020	Ararat Yerevan	17	(0)
2020	Akron Tolyatti	14	(0)
2021	Krymteplytsia Molodizhne		
2021–2024	Amkar Perm	56	(4)
2024	Khimik Dzerzhinsk	13	(0)
- * Club domestic league appearances and goals

Konstantin Valeryevich Morozov (Russian: Константин Валерьевич Морозов; born 13 May 1992) is a Russian former professional football player.

== Club career ==
He made his Russian Football National League debut for FC Torpedo Armavir on 12 July 2015 in a game against FC Zenit-2 Saint Petersburg.
