= Ivan Mamakhanov =

Armenian-Russian footballer

Personal information
- Full name: Ivan Romanovich Mamakhanov
- Date of birth: 26 February 1996 (age 30)
- Place of birth: Ivanteyevka, Russia
- Height: 1.87 m (6 ft 1 1/2 in)
- Position: Defender

Senior career*
Years	Team	Apps	(Gls)
2014	LFK Lokomotiv Moscow		
2014–2015	Ulisses	10	(0)
2015	Torpedo Armavir	8	(0)
2017–2018	Ararat Moscow	12	(0)
2018–2019	Yerevan	27	(1)

International career^{‡}
2014	Armenia U19	1	(0)
2015	Armenia U21	4	(0)
- * Club domestic league appearances and goals as of 27 May 2018 ‡ National team caps and goals as of 17 November 2015

Ivan Romanovich Mamakhanov (Russian: Иван Романович Мамаханов; born 26 February 1996) is an Armenian football player. He also holds Russian citizenship.

== Club career ==
Mamakhanov made his professional debut in the Russian Football National League for FC Torpedo Armavir on 12 July 2015 in a game against FC Zenit-2 St. Petersburg.
