= Taymuraz Toboyev =

Russian footballer

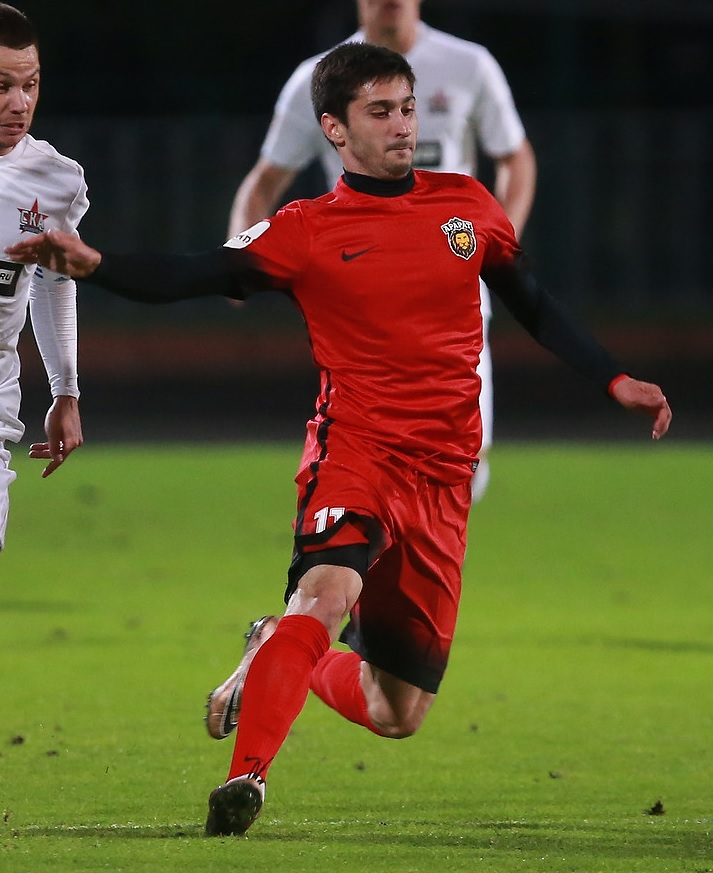
- Toboyev with Ararat Moscow in 2017

Personal information
- Full name: Taymuraz Muratovich Toboyev
- Date of birth: 9 March 1995 (age 31)
- Place of birth: Vladikavkaz, Russia
- Height: 1.70 m (5 ft 7 in)
- Position: Midfielder

Senior career*
Years	Team	Apps	(Gls)
2012–2013	Alania Vladikavkaz	0	(0)
2013–2014	SKA-Energiya Khabarovsk	8	(0)
2015	Mika	14	(3)
2016	Guria Lanchkhuti	3	(0)
2017–2018	Ararat Moscow	21	(7)
2018–2019	Spartak Vladikavkaz	17	(0)
2019–2020	Ararat Yerevan	5	(0)
2020	Urartu	2	(0)
2020	Kolomna	6	(1)
2021	Dynamo Stavropol	14	(3)
2021	Salyut Belgorod	2	(0)
2021–2022	Mashuk-KMV Pyatigorsk	13	(2)
2022	Kyran	7	(1)
2022	Okzhetpes	14	(3)
2023	Alania-2 Vladikavkaz	14	(5)
2023	Alania Vladikavkaz	0	(0)
2024	Spartak Nalchik	12	(3)
2024–2025	Alania Vladikavkaz	14	(0)
- * Club domestic league appearances and goals as of 24 May 2025

Taymuraz Muratovich Toboyev (Russian: Таймураз Муратович Тобоев; born 9 March 1995) is a Russian football midfielder.

== Career ==
Toboyev made his debut in the Russian Football National League for SKA-Energiya Khabarovsk on 23 August 2013 in a game against Gazovik Orenburg.

On 26 June 2019, Ararat Yerevan announced the signing of Toboyev, along with 12 other players, before leaving Ararat Yerevan on 16 January 2020. On 4 February 2020, Urartu announced the signing of Toboyev. On 13 July 2020, Toboyev left Urartu by mutual agreement.

== Career statistics ==
=== Club ===
As of match played 9 June 2020

Appearances and goals by club, season and competition
Club	Season	League			National Cup		League Cup		Continental		Other		Total	
Club	Season	Division	Apps	Goals	Apps	Goals	Apps	Goals	Apps	Goals	Apps	Goals	Apps	Goals
SKA-Energiya Khabarovsk	2013–14	Russian National League	8	0	1	0	–		–		–		9	0
Mika	2015–16	Armenian Premier League	14	3	0	0	–		–		–		14	3
Guria Lanchkhuti	2015–16	Umaglesi Liga	3	0	0	0	–		–		–		3	0
Ararat Moscow	2017–18	Professional Football League	21	7	4	1	–		–		–		25	8
Spartak Vladikavkaz	2018-19	Professional Football League	17	0	0	0	–		–		–		17	0
Ararat Yerevan	2019–20	Armenian Premier League	5	0	0	0	–		–		–		5	0
Urartu	2019–20	Armenian Premier League	2	0	0	0	–		0	0	–		2	0
Career total			70	10	5	1	-	-	-	-	-	-	75	11
