= Pavel Sergeyev (footballer) =

Russian footballer

Personal information
- Full name: Pavel Aleksandrovich Sergeyev
- Date of birth: 20 June 1993 (age 33)
- Place of birth: Kamyshin, Russia
- Height: 1.76 m (5 ft 9 in)
- Position: Midfielder

Senior career*
| Years | Team | Apps | (Gls) |
| 2010–2012 | FC Spartak Moscow | 0 | (0) |
| 2012–2015 | FC Arsenal Tula | 47 | (1) |
| 2014–2015 | FC Arsenal-2 Tula | 40 | (7) |
| 2016 | FC Ryazan | 8 | (1) |
| 2016–2017 | FC Tekstilshchik Ivanovo | 39 | (2) |
| 2018 | FC Ararat Moscow | 7 | (0) |
| 2018–2019 | FSK Dolgoprudny | 29 | (2) |
| 2020 | FC West Armenia | | |
| 2020 | FC Ryazan | 12 | (0) |
- * Club domestic league appearances and goals

Pavel Aleksandrovich Sergeyev (Russian: Павел Александрович Сергеев; born 20 June 1993) is a Russian former professional football player.

== Club career ==
He made his Russian Premier League debut on 21 March 2015 for FC Arsenal Tula in a game against PFC CSKA Moscow.
