= Arsen Ayrapetyan =

Russian footballer

Personal information
- Full name: Arsen Mgerovich Ayrapetyan
- Date of birth: 16 February 1997 (age 29)
- Place of birth: Yaroslavl, Russia
- Height: 1.79 m (5 ft 10 in)
- Position: Midfielder

Senior career*
Years	Team	Apps	(Gls)
2013–2015	Shinnik-M Yaroslavl		
2015–2020	Shinnik Yaroslavl	22	(2)
2017–2018	→ Ararat Moscow (loan)	21	(1)
2018–2019	→ Znamya Truda (loan)	21	(2)
2019–2020	→ Murom (loan)	16	(4)
2020–2023	Rodina Moscow	49	(8)
2022	Rodina-2 Moscow	5	(0)
2022–2023	→ Noah (loan)	26	(0)
2023	Tekstilshchik Ivanovo	2	(0)
2024	Ryazan	13	(0)
- * Club domestic league appearances and goals as of 7 July 2024

Arsen Mgerovich Ayrapetyan (Russian: Арсен Мгерович Айрапетян; born 16 February 1997) is a Russian football player of Armenian descent.

== Club career ==
He made his debut in the Russian Football National League for Shinnik Yaroslavl on 17 August 2015 in a game against Arsenal Tula.
