= Aleksei Pugin =

Russian footballer

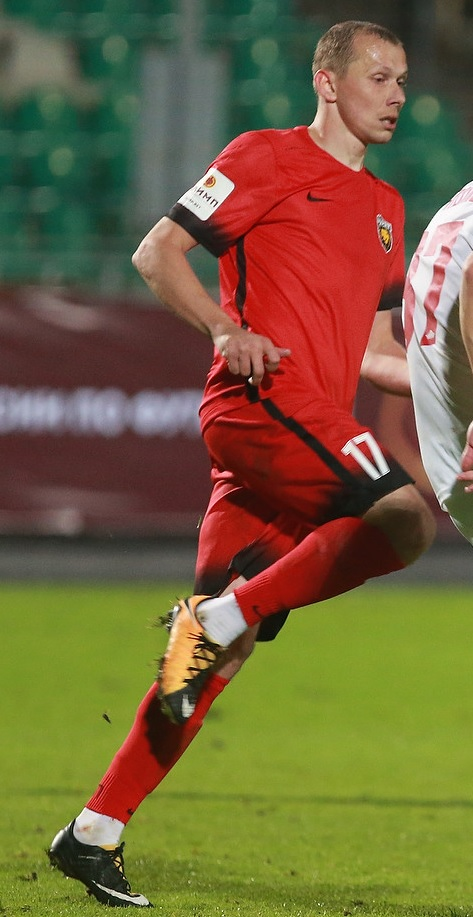
- Pugin with Ararat Moscow in 2017

Personal information
- Full name: Aleksei Anatolyevich Pugin
- Date of birth: 7 March 1987 (age 39)
- Place of birth: Kirov, Soviet Union
- Height: 1.82 m (5 ft 11 1/2 in)
- Positions: Midfielder; forward

Senior career*
Years	Team	Apps	(Gls)
2009	Mashinostroitel Kirov		
2010–2011	Dynamo Vologda	63	(24)
2012	Dynamo Bryansk	13	(0)
2012–2014	Rotor Volgograd	35	(3)
2014–2015	Torpedo Moscow	19	(3)
2015–2017	Tom Tomsk	58	(11)
2017	Ararat Moscow	13	(1)
2018	Tom Tomsk	9	(3)
2018	Baltika Kaliningrad	8	(2)
2019–2020	Shinnik Yaroslavl	11	(2)
- * Club domestic league appearances and goals

Aleksei Anatolyevich Pugin (Russian: Алексей Анатольевич Пугин; born 7 March 1987) is a Russian former football player.

== Club career ==
He made his Russian Premier League debut for FC Torpedo Moscow on 2 August 2014 in a game against PFC CSKA Moscow.
