= Denis Borisovich Korolyov =

Russian footballer

Denis Korolyov
Personal information
- Full name: Denis Borisovich Korolyov
- Date of birth: 19 April 1987 (age 39)
- Place of birth: Ramenskoye, Moscow Oblast, Russian SFSR
- Height: 1.76 m (5 ft 9 in)
- Position: Midfielder

Senior career*
Years	Team	Apps	(Gls)
2007	FC Saturn Yegoryevsk	21	(0)
2008–2009	FC MVD Rossii Moscow	46	(2)
2009	FC Volgar-Gazprom-2 Astrakhan	7	(0)
2010	FC Sakhalin Yuzhno-Sakhalinsk	10	(0)
2010	FC Torpedo-ZIL Moscow	10	(0)
2011	FC Mostovik-Primorye Ussuriysk	13	(0)
2011–2012	FC Gubkin	15	(0)
2012–2013	FC Sever Murmansk	25	(0)
2013	FC Metallurg-Oskol Stary Oskol	8	(1)
2014–2015	FC Volga Tver	30	(0)
2016–2018	FC Saturn Ramenskoye	52	(4)
- * Club domestic league appearances and goals

Denis Borisovich Korolyov (Russian: Денис Борисович Королёв; born 19 April 1987) is a Russian former professional football player.

== Club career ==
He played in the Russian Football National League for FC MVD Rossii Moscow and FC Volgar-Gazprom-2 Astrakhan in 2009.
