= Vyacheslav Shishkin =

Russian footballer

Personal information
- Full name: Vyacheslav Aleksandrovich Shishkin
- Date of birth: 1 February 1993 (age 33)
- Place of birth: Novosibirsk, Russia
- Height: 1.80 m (5 ft 11 in)
- Position: Defender

Youth career
- FC Sibir Novosibirsk

Senior career*
Years	Team	Apps	(Gls)
2010	FC Sibir Novosibirsk	0	(0)
2011–2013	FC Sibir-2 Novosibirsk	51	(3)
2013–2014	FC Sibir Novosibirsk	0	(0)
2014	FC Sibir-2 Novosibirsk	15	(0)
2015–2016	FC Sibir Novosibirsk	6	(0)
2015–2016	FC Sibir-2 Novosibirsk	20	(1)
2016–2017	FC Syzran-2003	8	(1)
2017	FC Sokol Saratov	17	(0)
2019–2020	FC Volna Kovernino (amateur)		
2020	FC Volna Nizhny Novgorod Oblast	12	(0)

International career
2009–2010	Russia U-17	6	(1)
- * Club domestic league appearances and goals

Vyacheslav Aleksandrovich Shishkin (Russian: Вячеслав Александрович Шишкин; born 1 February 1993) is a Russian former football defender.

== Club career ==
He made his debut in the Russian Second Division for FC Sibir-2 Novosibirsk on 5 June 2011 in a game against FC Yakutiya Yakutsk.

Shishkin played for FC Sibir in the Russian Football National League.
