= Roman Manuylov =

Russian footballer

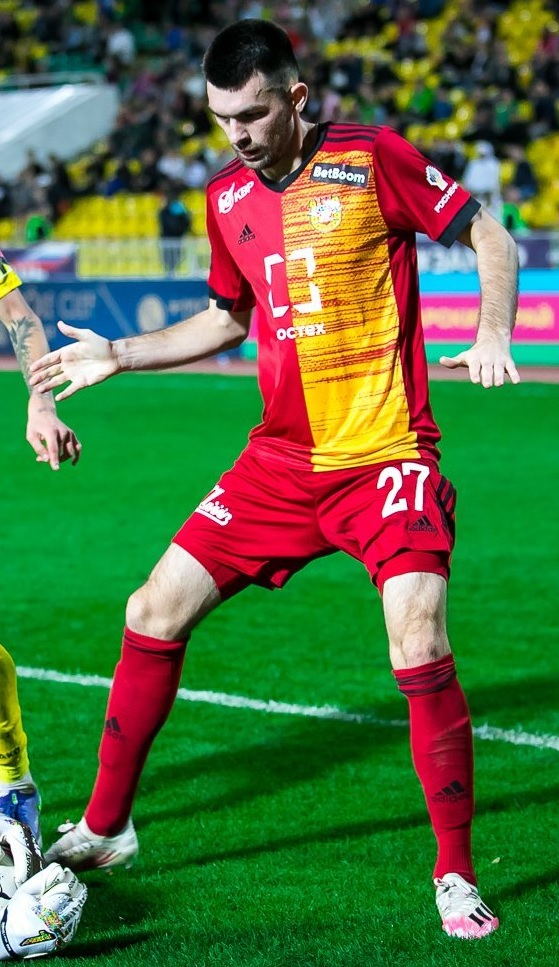
- Manuylov with Arsenal Tula in 2022

Personal information
- Full name: Roman Olegovich Manuylov
- Date of birth: 1 July 1995 (age 31)
- Place of birth: Komsomolsk-on-Amur, Russia
- Height: 1.80 m (5 ft 11 in)
- Positions: Defender; midfielder

Team information
- Current team: KAMAZ Naberezhnye Chelny
- Number: 27

Senior career*
Years	Team	Apps	(Gls)
2012–2017	Smena Komsomolsk-na-Amure	103	(4)
2017	Zenit Penza	15	(0)
2018–2019	Tom Tomsk	39	(1)
2020–2022	SKA-Khabarovsk	64	(6)
2022–2023	Arsenal Tula	13	(0)
2023–	KAMAZ Naberezhnye Chelny	38	(5)
- * Club domestic league appearances and goals as of 16 May 2026

Roman Olegovich Manuylov (Russian: Роман Олегович Мануйлов; born 1 July 1995) is a Russian football player who plays for KAMAZ Naberezhnye Chelny.

== Career ==
He made his debut in the Russian Second Division for Smena Komsomolsk-na-Amure on 5 August 2012 in a game against Dynamo Barnaul.

He made his Russian Football National League debut for Tom Tomsk on 17 March 2018 in a game against Tyumen.

== Career statistics ==
As of 16 May 2026

Club	Season	League			Cup		Other		Total	
Club	Season	Division	Apps	Goals	Apps	Goals	Apps	Goals	Apps	Goals
Smena	2012–13	Russian Second League	17	0	1	0	—		18	0
Smena	2013–14	Russian Second League	23	1	1	0	—		24	1
Smena	2014–15	Russian Second League	23	2	5	0	—		28	2
Smena	2015–16	Russian Second League	21	1	1	0	—		22	1
Smena	2016–17	Russian Second League	19	0	1	0	—		20	0
Smena	Total		103	4	9	0	0	0	112	4
Zenit Penza	2017–18	Russian Second League	15	0	1	0	—		16	0
Tom Tomsk	2017–18	Russian First League	3	0	—		—		3	0
Tom Tomsk	2018–19	Russian First League	14	0	1	0	—		15	0
Tom Tomsk	2019–20	Russian First League	22	1	2	0	—		24	1
Tom Tomsk	Total		39	1	3	0	0	0	42	1
SKA-Khabarovsk	2019–20	Russian First League	2	0	—		—		2	0
SKA-Khabarovsk	2020–21	Russian First League	28	2	3	0	—		31	2
SKA-Khabarovsk	2021–22	Russian First League	34	4	1	0	2 (Note: Appearances in promotion play-offs)	0	37	4
SKA-Khabarovsk	Total		64	6	4	0	2	0	70	6
Arsenal Tula	2022–23	Russian First League	13	0	1	0	—		14	0
KAMAZ	2023–24	Russian First League	16	3	0	0	—		16	3
KAMAZ	2024–25	Russian First League	5	0	0	0	—		5	0
KAMAZ	2025–26	Russian First League	17	2	2	0	—		19	2
KAMAZ	Total		38	5	2	0	0	0	40	5
Career total			272	16	20	0	2	0	294	16
