= Yegor Tarakanov =

Russian footballer

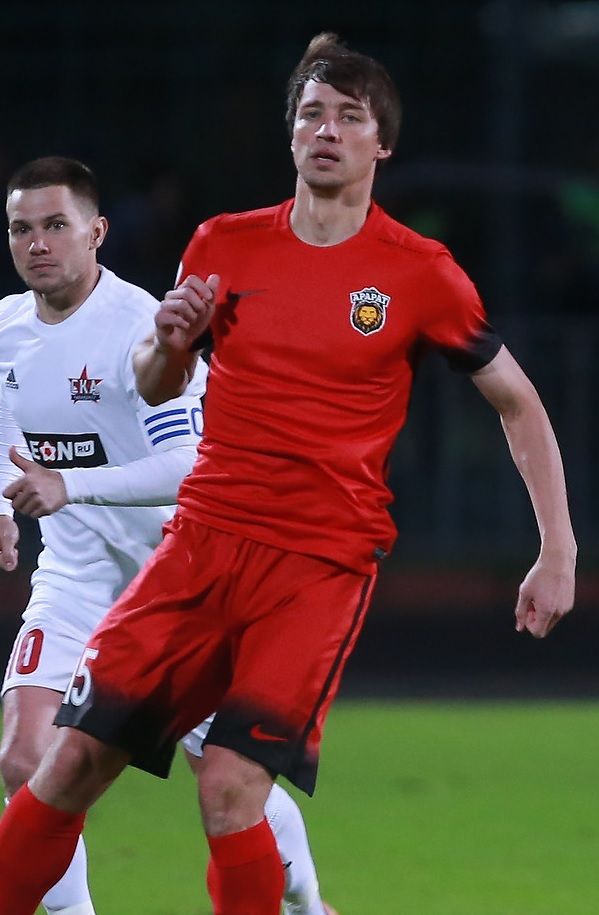
- Tarakanov with Ararat Moscow in 2017

Personal information
- Full name: Yegor Sergeyevich Tarakanov
- Date of birth: 17 April 1987 (age 39)
- Place of birth: Ustinov, Russian SFSR
- Height: 1.84 m (6 ft 0 in)
- Position: Centre back

Senior career*
Years	Team	Apps	(Gls)
2003–2004	FC Izhevsk	2	(0)
2006–2009	FC Volga Nizhny Novgorod	93	(5)
2010–2012	FC Krasnodar	7	(0)
2011	→ FC Chernomorets Novorossiysk (loan)	9	(0)
2011–2012	→ FC Nizhny Novgorod	26	(2)
2012–2013	FC Volga Nizhny Novgorod	0	(0)
2013–2015	FC Torpedo Moscow	31	(0)
2015–2016	FC Torpedo Armavir	21	(0)
2016–2017	FC Neftekhimik Nizhnekamsk	27	(0)
2017–2018	FC Ararat Moscow	24	(2)
2018	FC Murom	0	(0)
2018	FC Pyunik	0	(0)
2019	FC Murom	6	(0)
2019–2020	FC Urozhay Krasnodar	9	(0)
- * Club domestic league appearances and goals

Yegor Sergeyevich Tarakanov (Russian: Егор Серге́евич Тараканов; born 17 April 1987) is a Russian former professional football player.

== Club career ==
He made his Russian Premier League debut for FC Torpedo Moscow on 12 August 2014 in a game against FC Amkar Perm.
