= Yevgeny Frolov (footballer, born 1986) =

Russian footballer

Personal information
- Full name: Yevgeny Nikolayevich Frolov
- Date of birth: 29 January 1986 (age 40)
- Place of birth: Lipetsk, Russian SFSR
- Height: 1.86 m (6 ft 1 in)
- Positions: Defender; midfielder

Team information
- Current team: Metallurg Lipetsk (assistant coach)

Youth career
- Metallurg Lipetsk

Senior career*
Years	Team	Apps	(Gls)
2003–2008	Metallurg Lipetsk	81	(4)
2009	FC Yelets	13	(0)
2009	Spartak Tambov	12	(1)
2010	Lokomotiv Liski	26	(1)
2011–2021	Metallurg Lipetsk	209	(11)

Managerial career
- 2025–: Metallurg Lipetsk (assistant)
- * Club domestic league appearances and goals

Yevgeny Nikolayevich Frolov (Russian: Евгений Николаевич Фролов; born 29 January 1986) is a Russian professional football coach and a former player. He is an assistant coach with Metallurg Lipetsk.

== Club career ==
He made his Russian Football National League debut for FC Metallurg Lipetsk on 9 July 2005 in a game against FC Fakel Voronezh.
