= Maksim Bukatkin =

Russian footballer and coach

Personal information
- Full name: Maksim Sergeyevich Bukatkin
- Date of birth: 16 July 1985 (age 41)
- Place of birth: Noginsk, Moscow Oblast, Russian SFSR
- Height: 1.80 m (5 ft 11 in)
- Positions: Midfielder; forward

Team information
- Current team: FC Rodina-2 Moscow (assistant)

Senior career*
Years	Team	Apps	(Gls)
2003	FC Mosenergo Moscow	4	(0)
2005	FC Dynamo Vologda	22	(0)
2007–2009	FC Znamya Truda Orekhovo-Zuyevo	77	(14)
2010	FC Sheksna Cherepovets	22	(1)
2011	FC Saturn-2 Moscow Oblast	18	(2)
2011–2012	FC Sheksna Cherepovets	22	(0)
2012	JK Trans Narva	14	(1)
2013	FC Znamya Truda Orekhovo-Zuyevo	5	(0)

Managerial career
- 2013–2017: SDYuShOR Noginsky District
- 2017: FC Ararat-2 Moscow (administrator)
- 2017: FC Ararat-2 Moscow
- 2017–2018: FC Ararat Moscow (assistant)
- 2018: FC Ararat Moscow
- 2019: FC Ararat Moscow (assistant)
- 2020–2023: FC Dynamo Moscow (U19 assistant)
- 2025–: FC Rodina-2 Moscow (assistant)
- * Club domestic league appearances and goals

Maksim Sergeyevich Bukatkin (Russian: Максим Серге́евич Букаткин; born 16 July 1985) is a Russian professional football coach and a former player. He is an assistant coach with FC Rodina-2 Moscow.

== Coaching career ==
On 12 April 2018, he was appointed manager of FC Ararat Moscow.
