= Aslan Tautiyev =

Russian footballer (born 1990)

Personal information
- Full name: Aslan Kazikovich Tautiyev
- Date of birth: 25 May 1990 (age 36)
- Place of birth: Ordzhonikidze, Russian SFSR
- Height: 1.80 m (5 ft 11 in)
- Position: Defender

Senior career*
Years	Team	Apps	(Gls)
2012–2013	FC Biolog Novokubansk	31	(0)
2013–2015	FC Volgar Astrakhan	20	(1)
2016	FC Chernomorets Novorossiysk	8	(0)
2016–2017	FC Chayka Peschanokopskoye	25	(0)
2017	FC Sokol Saratov	17	(2)
2018	FC Elektroavtomatika Stavropol		
- * Club domestic league appearances and goals

Aslan Kazikovich Tautiyev (Russian: Аслан Казикович Таутиев; born 25 May 1990) is a Russian former football defender.

== Club career ==
He played two seasons in the Russian Football National League for FC Volgar Astrakhan.
