= Aleksei Rebko =

Russian footballer

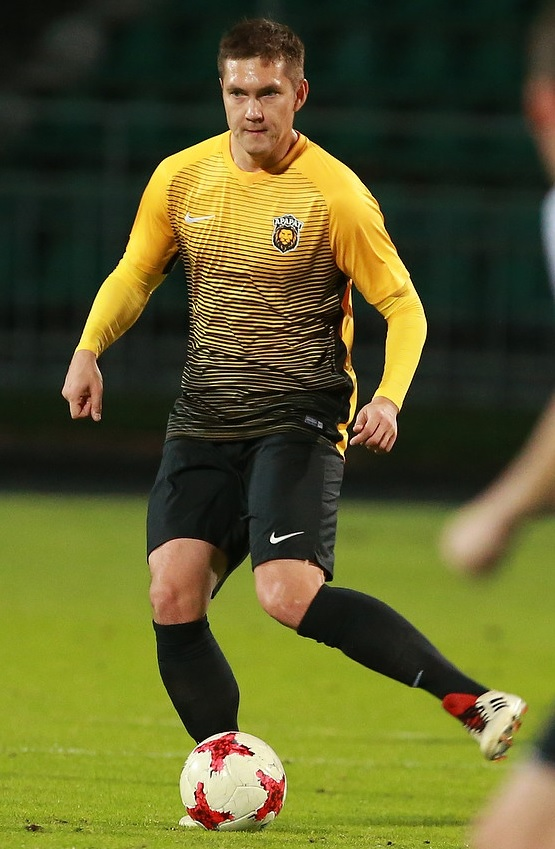
- Rebko with Ararat Moscow in 2017

Personal information
- Full name: Aleksei Vasilyevich Rebko
- Date of birth: 23 April 1986 (age 40)
- Place of birth: Moscow, Soviet Union
- Height: 1.78 m (5 ft 10 in)
- Position: Midfielder

Team information
- Current team: Fakel Voronezh (reserves manager)

Youth career
- Spartak Moscow

Senior career*
| Years | Team | Apps | (Gls) |
| 2001–2007 | Spartak Moscow | 13 | (0) |
| 2008 | Rubin Kazan | 3 | (0) |
| 2008–2009 | Moscow | 43 | (7) |
| 2010 | Dynamo Moscow | 19 | (0) |
| 2011 | Rostov | 14 | (0) |
| 2012 | Tom Tomsk | 11 | (2) |
| 2012–2014 | Amkar Perm | 4 | (2) |
| 2014–2015 | Rostov | 19 | (0) |
| 2015 | Nika Moscow (amateur) | | |
| 2016–2017 | Luch-Energiya Vladivostok | 34 | (1) |
| 2017 | Ararat Moscow | 16 | (2) |
| 2018 | Rotor Volgograd | 7 | (0) |

International career
| 2006–2008 | Russia U-21 | 5 | (1) |
| 2009 | Russia | 3 | (0) |

Managerial career
- 2019–2021: Strogino Moscow (youth)
- 2020–2021: Strogino-2 Moscow (assistant)
- 2021–2023: Lokomotiv Moscow (academy)
- 2023–2024: Fakel Voronezh (assistant)
- 2024–: Fakel Voronezh (reserves)
- 2026: Fakel Voronezh (caretaker)
- * Club domestic league appearances and goals

Aleksei Vasilyevich Rebko (Russian: Алексей Васильевич Ребко; born 23 April 1986) is a Russian association football coach and a former midfielder. He is the manager of the reserves team of Fakel Voronezh.

== Club career ==
He broke the record of youngest players record for Spartak in 2002, previously held by Aleksandr Pavlenko.

He made two appearances in UEFA Champions League 2006–07, but in total just played 13 minutes. On 25 February 2010 FC Dynamo Moscow signed the former FC Moscow midfielder on a free transfer until 2013.

== International career ==
Rebko made his debut for the Russia national football team on 5 September 2009 in a game against Liechtenstein.

== Coaching career ==
On 11 October 2026, Rebko was appointed caretaker manager of Russian Premier League club Fakel Voronezh, where he was coaching the reserve team.

== Career statistics ==
=== Club ===
As of match played 7 August 2017

Appearances and goals by club, season and competition
| Club | Season | League | | | National Cup | | League Cup | | Continental | | Other | | Total | |
| Club | Season | Division | Apps | Goals | Apps | Goals | Apps | Goals | Apps | Goals | Apps | Goals | Apps | Goals |
|---|---|---|---|---|---|---|---|---|---|---|---|---|---|---|
| Spartak Moscow | 2002 | Russian Premier League | 1 | 0 | 1 | 0 | – | | 0 | 0 | – | | 2 | 0 |
| Spartak Moscow | 2003 | Russian Premier League | 0 | 0 | 0 | 0 | – | | 0 | 0 | – | | 0 | 0 |
| Spartak Moscow | 2004 | Russian Premier League | 0 | 0 | 0 | 0 | – | | 1 | 0 | – | | 1 | 0 |
| Spartak Moscow | 2005 | Russian Premier League | 0 | 0 | 1 | 0 | – | | – | | – | | 1 | 0 |
| Spartak Moscow | 2006 | Russian Premier League | 9 | 0 | 2 | 0 | – | | 2 | 0 | – | | 13 | 0 |
| Spartak Moscow | 2007 | Russian Premier League | 3 | 0 | 5 | 0 | – | | 0 | 0 | – | | 8 | 0 |
| Spartak Moscow | Total | | 13 | 0 | 9 | 0 | - | - | 3 | 0 | - | - | 25 | 0 |
| Rubin Kazan | 2008 | Russian Premier League | 3 | 0 | 0 | 0 | – | | – | | – | | 3 | 0 |
| Moscow | 2008 | Russian Premier League | 16 | 2 | 2 | 0 | – | | 2 | 0 | – | | 20 | 2 |
| Moscow | 2009 | Russian Premier League | 27 | 5 | 4 | 0 | – | | – | | – | | 31 | 5 |
| Moscow | Total | | 43 | 7 | 6 | 0 | - | - | 2 | 0 | - | - | 51 | 7 |
| Dynamo Moscow | 2010 | Russian Premier League | 19 | 0 | 1 | 0 | – | | – | | – | | 20 | 0 |
| Rostov | 2011–12 | Russian Premier League | 14 | 0 | 0 | 0 | – | | – | | – | | 14 | 0 |
| Tom Tomsk | 2011–12 | Russian Premier League | 11 | 2 | 0 | 0 | – | | – | | – | | 11 | 2 |
| Amkar Perm | 2012–13 | Russian Premier League | 3 | 2 | 0 | 0 | – | | – | | – | | 3 | 2 |
| Amkar Perm | 2013–14 | Russian Premier League | 1 | 0 | 0 | 0 | – | | – | | – | | 1 | 0 |
| Amkar Perm | Total | | 4 | 2 | 0 | 0 | - | - | - | - | - | - | 4 | 2 |
| Rostov | 2014–15 | Russian Premier League | 17 | 0 | 1 | 0 | – | | – | | 2 | 0 | 20 | 0 |
| Luch-Energiya Vladivostok | 2015–16 | Football National League | 14 | 0 | 0 | 0 | – | | – | | – | | 14 | 0 |
| Luch-Energiya Vladivostok | 2016–17 | Football National League | 20 | 1 | 0 | 0 | – | | – | | – | | 20 | 1 |
| Luch-Energiya Vladivostok | Total | | 34 | 1 | 0 | 0 | - | - | - | - | - | - | 34 | 1 |
| Ararat Moscow | 2017–18 | Professional Football League | 2 | 0 | 1 | 0 | – | | – | | – | | 3 | 0 |
| Career total | | | 160 | 12 | 18 | 0 | - | - | 5 | 0 | 2 | 0 | 185 | 12 |

=== International ===
Russia national team
| Year | Apps | Goals |
|---|---|---|
| 2009 | 3 | 0 |
| Total | 3 | 0 |

Statistics accurate as of match played 14 October 2009
