= Sergei Bulatov =

Russian footballer

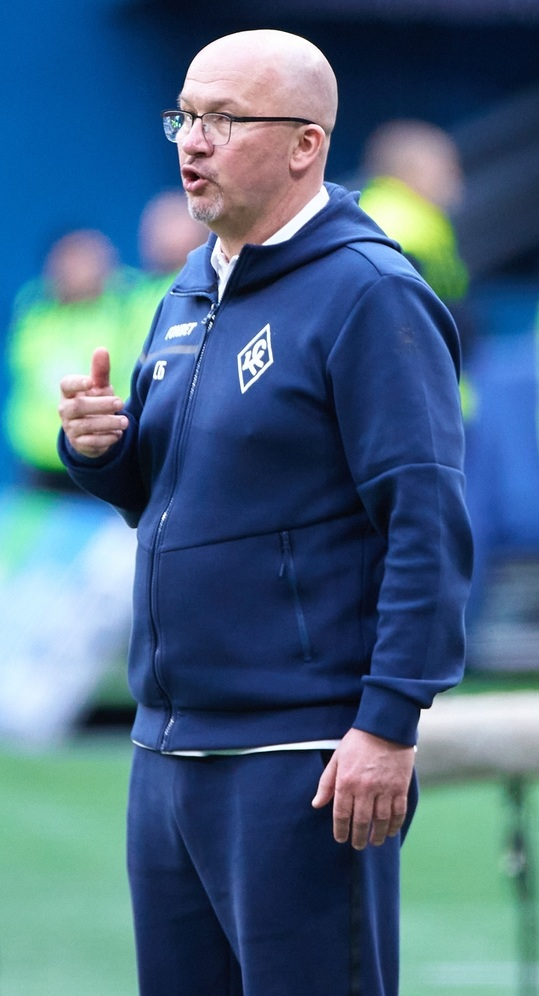
- Bulatov in charge of Krylia Sovetov in 2026

Personal information
- Full name: Sergei Aleksandrovich Bulatov
- Date of birth: 21 March 1972 (age 54)
- Place of birth: Sverdlovsk, Russian SFSR
- Height: 1.75 m (5 ft 9 in)
- Position: Forward

Team information
- Current team: Krylia Sovetov Samara (manager)

Senior career*
Years	Team	Apps	(Gls)
1989–1990	Uralmash Sverdlovsk	72	(12)
1991	Uralets Nizhny Tagil	33	(26)
1991–1992	Uralmash Yekaterinburg	13	(1)
1992	Uralets Nizhny Tagil	26	(7)
1993	Zvezda Perm	35	(12)
1994–1997	Baltika Kaliningrad	119	(54)
1997–1998	Krylia Sovetov Samara	29	(10)
1998	Baltika Kaliningrad	9	(3)
1999–2000	Fakel Voronezh	44	(14)
2001	Metallurg Krasnoyarsk	29	(14)
2002	Rubin Kazan	13	(3)
2002	Terek Grozny	8	(1)
2003–2005	KAMAZ Naberezhnye Chelny	78	(22)

Managerial career
- 2007–2008: KAMAZ Naberezhnye Chelny (scout)
- 2009: Dynamo Bryansk
- 2010: Volgar-Gazprom Astrakhan (assistant)
- 2012: Ural Yekaterinburg
- 2012: Ural Yekaterinburg (assistant)
- 2014: Avangard Kursk
- 2016–2017: Sakhalin Yuzhno-Sakhalinsk
- 2017: Ararat Moscow
- 2018: Sakhalin Yuzhno-Sakhalinsk
- 2019: Fakel Voronezh
- 2019: Ararat Yerevan
- 2020–2026: Krylia Sovetov Samara (assistant)
- 2026: Krylia Sovetov Samara (caretaker)
- 2026–: Krylia Sovetov Samara
- * Club domestic league appearances and goals

Sergei Aleksandrovich Bulatov (Russian: Сергей Александрович Булатов; born 21 March 1972) is a Russian professional football coach and a former player who is the manager of PFC Krylia Sovetov Samara.

== Playing career ==
As a player, he made his debut in the Soviet Second League in 1989 for FC Uralmash Sverdlovsk.

== Coaching career ==
On 1 April 2026, Bulatov was appointed caretaker manager of Krylia Sovetov Samara of the Russian Premier League. On 28 April 2026, he was appointed a permanent manager until the end of the 2025–26 season. On 10 June 2026, he signed a new two-season contract with Krylia Sovetov.

== Honours ==
- Russian First Division top scorer: 1995 (29 goals).
