= Poghos Galstyan =

Armenian footballer (born 1961)

Personal information
- Full name: Poghos Artush Galstyan
- Date of birth: 10 January 1961 (age 65)
- Place of birth: Barsum, Azerbaijani SSR, Soviet Union
- Height: 1.76 m (5 ft 9 in)
- Position: Midfielder

Team information
- Current team: Ararat-Armenia (general director)

Youth career
- SKIF Yerevan

Senior career*
Years	Team	Apps	(Gls)
1979–1981	Karabakh Stepanakert		
1982–1984	Ararat Yerevan	57	(9)
1985	Karabakh Stepanakert	11	(5)
1985	Spartak Hoktemberyan	1	(0)
1986–1989	Ararat Yerevan	54	(5)
1989–1990	Kotayk	64	(13)
1991	Ararat Yerevan	15	(1)
1992	Homenetmen Yerevan	33	(26)
1992–1993	Homenetmen Beirut		
1994	Kotayk	15	(3)

International career
1994	Armenia	1	(0)

Managerial career
- 1997: Tsement Ararat
- 1999: Zvartnots-AAL
- 2001–2003: Nika Moscow
- 2003–2004: Saturn Ramenskoye (assistant)
- 2004–2005: Nika Moscow (academy)
- 2006–2007: Luch-Energiya Vladivostok (assistant)
- 2008–2009: Kuban Krasnodar (assistant)
- 2008: Kuban Krasnodar (caretaker)
- 2009: Nika Moscow
- 2009: Kuban Krasnodar
- 2010: Nika Moscow
- 2012: Khimki (assistant)
- 2013: Akzhayik
- 2013: Khimki (assistant)
- 2014–2017: Ural Yekaterinburg (assistant)
- 2017: Ararat Moscow (assistant)
- 2017: Ararat Moscow
- 2017–2018: Ararat Moscow (general director)
- 2018–: Ararat-Armenia (general director)
- * Club domestic league appearances and goals

Poghos Galstyan (Armenian: Պողոս Գալստյան; born on 10 January 1961) is an Armenian football manager and former player who is a director with Ararat-Armenia.

== International career ==
A midfielder, Galstyan participated in one international match for the Armenia national team on 16 July 1994 in a home friendly match against Malta.

== Personal life ==
He is the father of Artush Galstyan.
