= FC Amkal Moscow =

Russian football club

Amkal
- Founded: 2018
- Chairman: German Popkov
- Manager: Vitaly Panov

Amkal is a Russian football club based in Moscow. It is one of the most popular media football clubs in Russia. Amkal was founded in 2018. The club was invited to participate in the 2022–23 Russian Cup. It was again invited to the Russian Cup the following season.

== Russian Cup results ==
Amkal Moscow was invited to participate in Russian Cup twice and had the following results:

2022–23: eliminated in 1/64 round by FC Zvezda Saint Petersburg, previously passing FC Tver and FC Zorkiy Krasnogorsk.

2023–24: eliminated in 1/128 round by FC Tekstilshchik Ivanovo, previously passing FC Krasnoye Znamya Noginsk.
