= Aleksei Kurzenyov =

Russian footballer

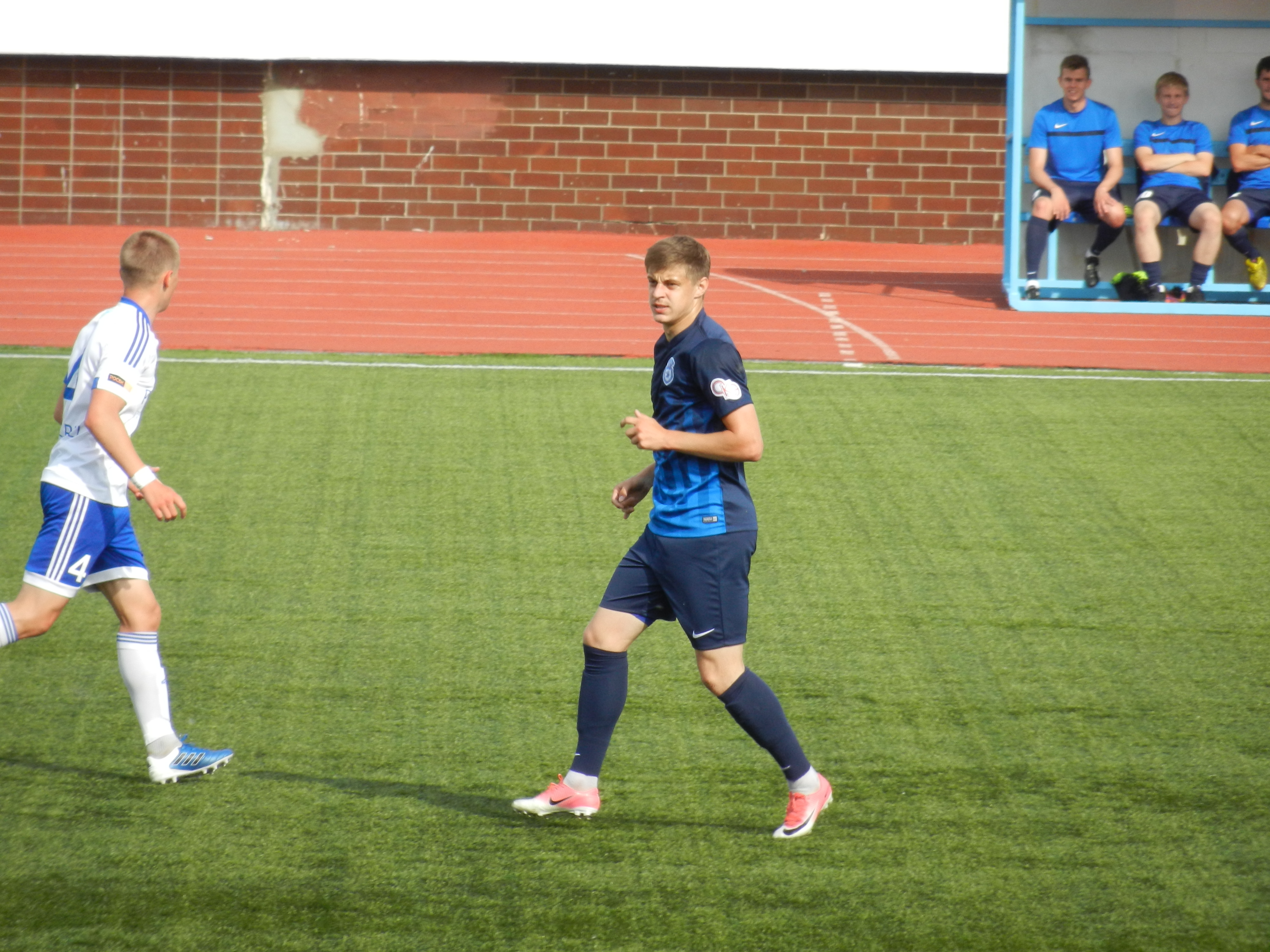

Personal information
- Full name: Aleksei Aleksandrovich Kurzenyov
- Date of birth: 9 January 1995 (age 31)
- Place of birth: Zelenodolsk, Tatarstan, Russia
- Height: 1.86 m (6 ft 1 in)
- Position: Forward

Team information
- Current team: 2DROTS
- Number: 91

Youth career
- –2012: Rubin Kazan
- 2012: Lokomotiv Moscow
- 2013–2014: CSKA Moscow

Senior career*
Years	Team	Apps	(Gls)
2014–2016	Amkar Perm	8	(0)
2016	Academia Chișinău	5	(1)
2017	Zenit Izhevsk	6	(0)
2017	Sokol Saratov	17	(3)
2018	Ararat Moscow	7	(2)
2018	Dnepr Mogilev	10	(1)
2019	Volga Ulyanovsk	9	(0)
2019–2020	Kafa Feodosia	11	(4)
2020–2021	Krymteplytsia Molodizhne	2	(0)
2021–2022	Tver	32	(8)
2022	Salyut Belgorod	14	(2)
2023	Rubin-2 Kazan	5	(0)
2024–	2DROTS	21	(4)

International career
2010–2011	Russia U16	10	(3)
2011–2012	Russia U17	14	(4)
2013	Russia U18	6	(3)
2014	Russia U19	2	(1)
2015	Russia U21	6	(2)
- * Club domestic league appearances and goals as of 12 November 2023

Aleksei Aleksandrovich Kurzenyov (Russian: Алексей Александрович Курзенёв; born 9 January 1995) is a Russian professional football player who plays for 2DROTS.

== Club career ==
He made his debut in the Russian Premier League on 25 April 2014 for FC Amkar Perm in a game against FC Krylia Sovetov Samara.

He played for PFC CSKA Moscow in the 2013–14 UEFA Youth League.

== National team ==
From 2010 to 2014, he played for the Russian U-17 national team (born in 1995). During this period, he took part in 29 matches and scored 11 goals. In 2015, he played 6 matches for the Russian U-21 national team, scoring 2 goals.
