= Aleksandr Katsalapov =

Russian footballer

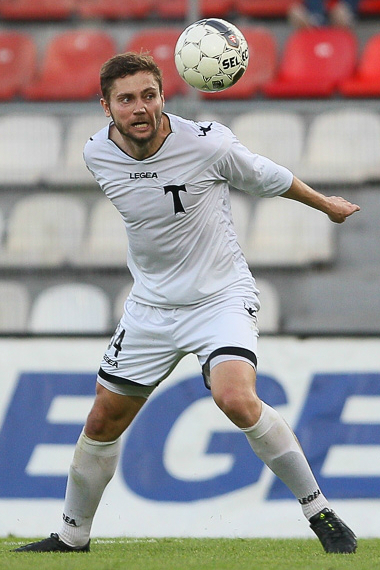
- Aleksandr Katsalapov in action for FC Torpedo Moscow

Personal information
- Full name: Aleksandr Anatolyevich Katsalapov
- Date of birth: 5 April 1986 (age 40)
- Place of birth: Volgograd, Soviet Union
- Height: 1.81 m (5 ft 11 in)
- Positions: Defender; midfielder

Senior career*
Years	Team	Apps	(Gls)
2002–2008	Rotor Volgograd	93	(6)
2009–2013	Ural Sverdlovsk Oblast	81	(0)
2013	Tyumen	7	(0)
2013–2015	Torpedo Moscow	48	(7)
2015–2016	Ufa	16	(0)
2016	Orenburg	8	(0)
2017–2018	Ararat Moscow	25	(3)
2019	Rotor Volgograd	10	(1)
2019–2021	Tyumen	35	(2)
- * Club domestic league appearances and goals

Aleksandr Anatolyevich Katsalapov (Russian: Александр Анатольевич Кацалапов; born 5 April 1986) is a Russian former footballer.

== Club career ==
He made his professional debut in the Russian Second Division in 2005 for FC Rotor Volgograd.

He made his Russian Premier League debut for FC Torpedo Moscow on 2 August 2014 in a game against PFC CSKA Moscow.
