= FC Solyaris Moscow =

Solyaris Moscow
- Founded: 2014
- Dissolved: 2017
- Ground: Spartakovets Stadium
- Capacity: 5,100
- 2016–17: PFL, Zone West, 6th
| Home colours | Away colours | Third colours |

FC Solyaris Moscow (Russian: ФК «Солярис» Москва) was a Russian football team based in Moscow. It was founded in 2014. In 2014–15 season, it started its professional history in the third-tier Russian Professional Football League. After the 2016–17 season, it was dissolved due to lack of financing.
