= FC Ararat Moscow =

Ararat Moscow
- Full name: Football Club Ararat Moscow
- Founded: 30 May 2017; 8 years ago
- Dissolved: February 5, 2020; 6 years ago
- Ground: Spartakovets Stadium
- Capacity: 5,100
- Chairman: Valery Hovhannisyan
- Manager: None
- League: None
- 2019–20: PFL, Zone Centre (excluded)

FC Ararat Moscow (Armenian: «Արարատ Մոսկվա» ՖԱ, Russian: ФК «Арарат» Москва) was a Russian football team based in Moscow that represented the Armenian diaspora in Russia. It was founded in 2017 and joined the Russian Professional Football League replacing FC Vityaz. The club was named after the Armenian club FC Ararat Yerevan.

== History ==
The club was founded in 2017 with the support of the Armenian Youth Association of Moscow. On 30 May 2017, the club received the Russian Football Union license for participation in the 2017–18 Russian Professional Football League season and signed a former Russia international forward Roman Pavlyuchenko. Pavlyuchenko was soon joined at Ararat by two more former national team players, Marat Izmailov and Aleksei Rebko.

On 30 July 2017, Sergei Bulatov resigned from his position as manager, Arkadi Imrekov taking over as caretaker manager. On 16 August 2017, Aleksandr Grigoryan was announced as Ararat's new permanent manager.

On 31 August 2017, the club announced that the club president Valeri Oganesyan has resigned and left for Georgia, and the financial audit conducted by the club discovered that Oganesyan transferred 20 million rubles (approx. €292,000) of club's funds to his personal accounts before leaving. The club lodged a complaint with the police to open criminal investigation into the matter. A week later, the media businessman Ashot Gabrelyanov (of Life news agency) who is involved in the management in the club, announced that the financials of the club are stable and the financial dispute with Oganesyan is settled, and the club is sponsored by billionaire Samvel Karapetyan and businessman Kamo Avagumyan.

On 26 October 2017, Grigoryan resigned as the manager despite Ararat leading the league decisively at the moment.

On 17 November 2017, Samvel Karapetyan was appointed the president of the club and Igor Zvezdin as the head coach. Dmitri Beznyak is officially registered with the league as the head coach and Zvezdin as senior coach-analyst. On 12 April 2018, Zvezdin left the club and was replaced by Maksim Bukatkin.

On 28 April 2018, Ararat secured first place in the Centre Zone of the PFL and the right to promotion to the second-tier Russian Football National League. Ararat initially were refused a license for the FNL, but appealed the decision. The appeal was declined on 30 May 2018.

On 9 January 2019, Ararat Moscow announced their return to Russian football, entering the Russian Professional Football League for the 2019–20 season. On 5 February 2020, Russian Football Union excluded Ararat from RPFL once again for failing licensing. The club was 8th in the table at the time.

=== League and cup history ===
| Season | League | | | | | | | | | Russian Cup | Top goalscorer | | Manager |
| Season | Div. | Pos. | Pl. | W | D | L | GS | GA | P | Russian Cup | Name | League | Manager |
|---|---|---|---|---|---|---|---|---|---|---|---|---|---|
| 2017–18 | 3rd | 1st | 26 | 19 | 6 | 1 | 49 | 15 | 63 | Round of 16 | Roman Pavlyuchenko | 9 | (Russia) Sergei Bulatov (Russia) Arkadi Imrekov (Caretaker) (Armenia) Aleksandr Grigoryan (Armenia) Poghos Galstyan (Caretaker) (Russia) Igor Zvezdin (Russia) Maksim Bukatkin |
| 2018-19 | no participation | - | - | - | - | - | - | - | - | - | - | - | - |
| 2019-20 | 3rd | 8th (excluded) | 17 | 7 | 2 | 8 | 34 | 36 | 23 | Forth round | | | |
| 2020-present | no participation | - | - | - | - | - | - | - | - | - | - | - | - |

== Statistics ==
=== Top goalscorers ===
As of Match played 26 May 2018

| | Name | Years | League | Russian Cup | Total |
|---|---|---|---|---|---|
| 1 | (Russia) Roman Pavlyuchenko | 2017 | 9 (11) | 0 (2) | 9 (13) |
| 2 | (Russia) Taymuraz Toboyev | 2017–Present | 7 (21) | 1 (4) | 8 (25) |
| 3 | (Georgia (country)) David Khurtsidze | 2017–Present | 3 (24) | 3 (4) | 6 (28) |
| 4 | (Russia) Igor Lebedenko | 2017 | 5 (17) | 0 (3) | 5 (20) |
| 5 | (Russia) Viktor Zemchenkov | 2017 | 3 (13) | 1 (4) | 4 (17) |
| 5 | (Russia) David Davidyan | 2017–Present | 4 (12) | 0 (2) | 4 (14) |
| 7 | (Russia) Aleksandr Katsalapov | 2017–Present | 3 (25) | 0 (4) | 3 (29) |
| 8 | (Russia) Marat Izmailov | 2017 | 2 (4) | 0 (0) | 2 (4) |
| 8 | (Russia) Yegor Tarakanov | 2017–Present | 2 (24) | 0 (4) | 2 (28) |
| 8 | (Russia) Aleksei Rebko | 2017 | 2 (13) | 0 (3) | 2 (16) |
| 8 | (Russia) Aleksei Kurzenyov | 2018–Present | 2 (7) | 0 (0) | 2 (7) |

=== Managerial ===
Information correct as of match played 26 May 2018. Only competitive matches are counted.

| Name | Nat. | From | To | P | W | D | L | GS | GA | %W | Honours | Notes |
|---|---|---|---|---|---|---|---|---|---|---|---|---|
| Sergei Bulatov | Russia | | 30 July 2017 | 3 | 2 | 1 | 0 | 8 | 3 | 66.67 | | |
| Arkadi Imrekov (Caretaker) | Russia | 30 July 2017 | 16 August 2017 | 3 | 3 | 0 | 0 | 6 | 1 | 100.00 | | |
| Aleksandr Grigoryan | Armenia | 16 August 2017 | 26 October 2017 | 12 | 10 | 1 | 1 | 25 | 8 | 83.33 | | |
| Poghos Galstyan (Caretaker) | Armenia | 26 October 2017 | 17 November 2017 | 3 | 2 | 1 | 0 | 3 | 0 | 66.67 | | |
| Igor Zvezdin | Russia | 17 November 2017 | 12 April 2018 | 0 | 0 | 0 | 0 | 0 | 0 | — | | |
| Maksim Bukatkin | Russia | 12 April 2018 | 30 May 2018 | 8 | 4 | 3 | 1 | 15 | 9 | 50.00 | | |

- Notes:

P – Total of played matches W – Won matches D – Drawn matches L – Lost matches GS – Goal scored GA – Goals against
%W – Percentage of matches won

Nationality is indicated by the corresponding FIFA country code(s).
