= 2019–20 FC Ararat Yerevan season =

Ararat Yerevan
2019–20 season
- Manager: Sergei Bulatov (until 29 July); Sergei Boyko (Interim) (29 July - 16 September); Gagik Simonyan (Interim) (16 September - 14 October); Vadym Lazorenko (14 October - 28 December); Igor Kolyvanov (from 6 January)
- Stadium: Hrazdan Stadium
- Premier League: 6th
- Armenian Cup: Second Round vs Noah
- Top goalscorer: League: Denys Dedechko (6); All: Denys Dedechko (6)
Home colours	Away colours	Third colours

The 2019–20 season was FC Ararat Yerevan's 29th consecutive season in Armenian Premier League.

== Season events ==
On 29 July, Sergei Bulatov resigned citing family circumstances, with Sergei Boyko being appointed as interim-manager the same day. On 16 September, Boyko resigned with Gagik Simonyan being placed in interim charge. On 14 October, Vadym Lazorenko was appointed as the new manager of Ararat Yerevan. On 28 December Lazorenko left Ararat Yerevan after the expiration of his contract. On 6 January, Igor Kolyvanov was announced as the new manager of Ararat Yerevan.

On 12 March 2020, the Football Federation of Armenia announced that all Armenian Premier League games had been postponed until 23 March due to the COVID-19 pandemic.

On 10 July, Lori announced that 17 of the players and staff had tested positive for COVID-19, and as a result the whole club was now isolating, as a result their lat game of the season, scheduled for 14 July against Ararat Yerevan was cancelled with the points not being awarded to either team.

== Squad ==
As of match played 6 July 2020

Number	Name	Nationality	Position	Date of birth (age)	Signed from	Signed in	Contract ends	Apps.	Goals
Goalkeepers
1	Sergei Revyakin	(Russia)	GK	2 April 1995 (aged 25)	Ararat Moscow	2019		25	0
12	Yevgeni Kobozev	(Russia)	GK	11 January 1990 (aged 30)	Pyunik	2020		3	0
98	Poghos Ayvazyan	(Armenia)	GK	9 June 1995 (aged 25)	Mika	2016		20	0
Defenders
2	Sidney	(Brazil)	DF	15 March 2000 (aged 20)	loan from Rukh Lviv	2020		0	0
3	João Victor	(Brazil)	DF	4 August 2000 (aged 19)	loan from XV de Novembro	2019	2020	9	0
4	Arkadi Kalaydzhyan	(Russia)	DF	1 December 1992 (aged 27)	Sochi	2019		11	0
15	Vahe Muradyan	(Armenia)	DF	28 January 1998 (aged 22)	Pyunik	2020		1	0
23	Ivan Spychka	(Ukraine)	DF	18 January 1991 (aged 29)	Ararat Moscow	2019		26	1
34	Yevgeni Makeyev	(Russia)	DF	24 July 1989 (aged 30)	Rotor Volgograd	2019		8	0
36	Rafinha	(Brazil)	DF	20 May 1999 (aged 21)	Associação	2020		8	0
45	Thomas Phibel	(Guadeloupe)	DF	31 May 1986 (aged 34)	Palanga	2020		8	0
66	Konstantin Morozov	(Russia)	DF	13 May 1992 (aged 28)	Ararat Moscow	2019		18	0
88	James	(Brazil)	DF	15 July 1995 (aged 24)	loan from XV de Novembro	2019		14	0
Midfielders
5	Zurab Arziani	(Georgia (country))	MF	19 October 1987 (aged 32)		2019		13	0
7	Aleksandr Kozlov	(Russia)	MF	19 March 1993 (aged 27)	Ararat Moscow	2019		20	4
8	Albert Mnatsakanyan	(Armenia)	MF	9 September 1999 (aged 20)	Ararat Moscow	2019		1	0
10	Zaven Badoyan	(Armenia)	MF	22 December 1989 (aged 30)	Shabab Al Sahel	2018		55	8
14	Ruslan Avagyan	(Armenia)	MF	24 June 1995 (aged 25)	Youth Team	2016		56	1
18	Karen Shirkhanyan	(Armenia)	MF	6 April 2000 (aged 20)	Youth Team	2019		4	0
27	David Khurtsidze	(Russia)	MF	4 July 1993 (aged 27)	Ararat Moscow	2019		27	4
29	Petros Afajanyan	(Armenia)	MF	31 October 1998 (aged 21)	Youth Team	2019		2	0
31	Davit Baghdasaryan	(Armenia)	MF	8 March 1998 (aged 22)	Pyunik	2019		3	0
32	Pavlo Stepanets	(Ukraine)	MF	26 May 1987 (aged 33)	Luch Vladivostok	2020		10	0
69	Denys Dedechko	(Ukraine)	MF	2 July 1987 (aged 33)	Oleksandriya	2019		21	6
70	Lukman Haruna	(Nigeria)	MF	4 December 1990 (aged 29)	US Tataouine	2020		5	0
77	Vitinho	(Brazil)	MF	8 September 1997 (aged 22)	Novorizontino	2019		13	0
97	David Davidyan	(Russia)	MF	14 December 1997 (aged 22)	Ararat-Armenia	2019		20	1
	Andranik Hovhannisyan	(Armenia)	MF	14 April 1999 (aged 21)	Youth Team	2016		1	0
	Arame Tsaturyan	(Armenia)	MF	7 August 2001 (aged 18)	Youth Team	2018		0	0
Forwards
9	Georgy Chelidze	(Russia)	FW	20 January 2000 (aged 20)	Tubize	2019		17	1
11	Ramazan Isayev	(Russia)	FW	17 January 1998 (aged 22)	FC Yerevan	2020		9	1
17	Sancidino Silva	(Portugal)	FW	5 March 1994 (aged 26)	Lausanne-Sport	2020		2	0
21	Emmanuel Odemis	(Armenia)	FW	5 July 2000 (aged 20)	Forward-Morges	2019		0	0
30	Ganiyu Oseni	(Nigeria)	FW	19 September 1991 (aged 28)	Hanoi	2020		8	0
37	Dmitri Ryzhov	(Russia)	FW	26 August 1989 (aged 30)	Akron Tolyatti	2019		10	1
80	Gabriel Silva	(Brazil)	FW	2 January 2001 (aged 19)	loan from XV de Novembro	2019	2020	1	0
90	Weslen Júnior	(Brazil)	FW	12 November 1995 (aged 24)	loan from São Bernardo	2019	2020	25	4
94	David Arshakyan	(Armenia)	FW	16 August 1994 (aged 25)	Rudeš	2019		6	1
99	Razmik Hakobyan	(Armenia)	FW	9 February 1996 (aged 24)	Alashkert	2018		14	1
Away on loan
Left during the season
11	Taymuraz Toboyev	(Russia)	FW	23 January 1992 (aged 28)	Spartak Vladikavkaz	2019		5	0
15	Yevgeni Balyaikin	(Russia)	MF	19 May 1988 (aged 32)		2019		3	0
18	Irakli Logua	(Russia)	MF	29 July 1991 (aged 28)	Ararat Moscow	2019		7	1
19	Artak Aleksanyan	(Armenia)	DF	10 March 1991 (aged 29)	Ararat Moscow	2019		3	0
22	Mikhail Petrushchenkov	(Russia)	GK	28 June 1993 (aged 27)	Zelenograd	2018		23	0
24	Sergey Karetnik	(Ukraine)	MF	14 February 1995 (aged 25)	Palanga	2019		1	0
33	Denis Shevchuk	(Russia)	FW	23 January 1992 (aged 28)	Ararat Moscow	2019		1	0
	Joel Cedeño	(Colombia)	MF			2019		0	0

=== Left club during season ===
Note: Flags indicate national team as defined under FIFA eligibility rules; some limited exceptions apply. Players may hold more than one non-FIFA nationality.

No.	Pos.	Nation	Player
11	FW	RUS	Taymuraz Toboyev (to Urartu)
15	DF	RUS	Yevgeni Balyaikin (to Masis)
18	MF	RUS	Irakli Logua
19	MF	ARM	Artak Aleksanyan

No.	Pos.	Nation	Player
22	GK	RUS	Mikhail Petrushchenkov (to Neftchi Kochkor-Ata)
24	FW	UKR	Sergey Karetnik (to Yenisey Krasnoyarsk)
33	FW	RUS	Denis Shevchuk (to Ocean Kerch)

== Transfers ==
=== In ===
Date	Position	Nationality	Name	From	Fee	Ref.
26 June 2019	GK	(Russia)	Sergei Revyakin	Ararat Moscow	Undisclosed	
26 June 2019	DF	(Armenia)	Artak Aleksanyan	Ararat Moscow	Undisclosed	
26 June 2019	DF	(Russia)	Arkadi Kalaydzhyan	Sochi	Undisclosed	
26 June 2019	DF	(Russia)	Konstantin Morozov	Ararat Moscow	Undisclosed	
26 June 2019	DF	(Ukraine)	Ivan Spychka	Ararat Moscow	Undisclosed	
26 June 2019	MF	(Armenia)	Albert Mnatsakanyan	Ararat Moscow	Free	
26 June 2019	MF	(Russia)	David Khurtsidze	Ararat Moscow	Undisclosed	
26 June 2019	MF	(Russia)	Aleksandr Kozlov	Ararat Moscow	Undisclosed	
26 June 2019	MF	(Russia)	Taymuraz Toboyev	Spartak Vladikavkaz	Undisclosed	
26 June 2019	MF	(Russia)	Valeri Yaroshenko		Free	
26 June 2019	FW	(Russia)	Georgy Chelidze	Tubize	Free	
26 June 2019	FW	(Russia)	Dmitri Ryzhov	Akron Tolyatti	Undisclosed	
26 June 2019	FW	(Russia)	Denis Shevchuk	Ararat Moscow	Undisclosed	
5 July 2019	DF	(Russia)	Yevgeni Makeyev	Rotor Volgograd	Undisclosed	
5 July 2019	MF	(Ukraine)	Denys Dedechko	Oleksandriya	Undisclosed	
18 July 2019	MF	(Russia)	David Davidyan	Ararat-Armenia	Free	
1 August 2019	DF	(Mali)	Drissa Diarra	AS Bamako	Undisclosed	
1 August 2019	MF	(Georgia (country))	Zurab Arziani		Free	
1 August 2019	MF	(Russia)	Yevgeni Balyaikin		Free	
1 August 2019	MF	(Ukraine)	Sergey Karetnik	Palanga	Undisclosed	
1 August 2019	FW	(Armenia)	Emmanuel Odemis	Forward-Morges	Undisclosed	
31 August 2019	DF	(Brazil)	James	Campinense	Undisclosed	
12 September 2019	FW	(Armenia)	David Arshakyan	NK Rudeš	Undisclosed	
15 September 2019	MF	(Brazil)	Vitinho	Novorizontino	Undisclosed	
15 September 2019	MF	(Russia)	Irakli Logua	Ararat Moscow	Undisclosed	
15 September 2019	MF	(Colombia)	Joel Cedeño		Undisclosed	
9 December 2019	FW	(Russia)	Ramazan Isayev	FC Yerevan	Undisclosed	
12 December 2019	MF	(Nigeria)	Lukman Haruna	US Tataouine	Undisclosed	
29 January 2020	GK	(Russia)	Yevgeni Kobozev	Pyunik	Free	
29 January 2020	DF	(Brazil)	Rafinha	Associação	Free	
29 February 2020	DF	(Guadeloupe)	Thomas Phibel	Palanga	Free	
29 February 2020	FW	(Portugal)	Sancidino Silva	Lausanne-Sport	Undisclosed	
29 February 2020	MF	(Ukraine)	Pavlo Stepanets	Luch Vladivostok	Free	
29 February 2020	FW	(Nigeria)	Ganiyu Oseni	Hanoi	Free	

=== Loans in ===
Start date	Position	Nationality	Name	To	End date	Ref.
1 August 2019	DF	(Brazil)	João Victor	XV de Novembro	End of Season	
1 August 2019	FW	(Brazil)	Weslen Júnior	São Bernardo	End of Season	
1 August 2019	FW	(Brazil)	Gabriel Santos	XV de Novembro	End of Season	
Winter 2020	DF	(Brazil)	Sidney	Rukh Lviv	End of Season	

=== Released ===
Date	Position	Nationality	Name	Joined	Date	Ref
26 July 2019	DF	(Armenia)	Rafael Safaryan	Retired		
5 December 2019	GK	(Russia)	Mikhail Petrushchenkov	Neftchi Kochkor-Ata		
5 December 2019	FW	(Russia)	Denis Shevchuk	Ocean Kerch		
16 January 2020	FW	(Russia)	Taymuraz Toboyev	Urartu	4 February 2020	
13 February 2020	DF	(Armenia)	Artak Aleksanyan			
Winter 2020	MF	(Colombia)	Joel Cedeño			
Winter 2020	MF	(Russia)	Yevgeni Balyaikin	Masis		
Winter 2020	FW	(Ukraine)	Sergey Karetnik	Yenisey Krasnoyarsk		
1 March 2020	MF	(Russia)	Irakli Logua	Forte Taganrog	1 July 2020	
24 July 2020	MF	(Georgia (country))	Zurab Arziani	Shevardeni-1906	10 September 2020	
24 July 2020	FW	(Nigeria)	Ganiyu Oseni	Kazma	17 August 2020	
24 July 2020	MF	(Ukraine)	Pavlo Stepanets	Urartu	12 September 2020	
24 July 2020	DF	(Brazil)	James	Urartu		
24 July 2020	DF	(Brazil)	Rafinha			
24 July 2020	FW	(Russia)	Dmitri Ryzhov			
24 July 2020	DF	(Guadeloupe)	Thomas Phibel	Meyrin	31 May 2021	
24 July 2020	DF	(Russia)	Konstantin Morozov	Akron Tolyatti		
24 July 2020	MF	(Ukraine)	Denys Dedechko	Noah		
24 July 2020	MF	(Nigeria)	Lukman Haruna			
24 July 2020	MF	(Brazil)	Vitinho	Urartu		
24 July 2020	MF	(Russia)	David Davidyan	Alashkert		
31 July 2020	MF	(Armenia)	Petros Afajanyan	Shirak	1 August 2020	
31 July 2020	MF	(Armenia)	Albert Mnatsakanyan	Tekstilshchik Ivanovo	29 September 2020	
31 July 2020	FW	(Armenia)	David Arshakyan	Irtysh Omsk	23 September 2020	
31 July 2020	FW	(Armenia)	Emmanuel Odemis			
31 July 2020	FW	(Portugal)	Sancidino Silva	Al-Taraji	5 August 2021	

== Friendlies ==
25 January 2020	Ararat Yerevan (Armenia)	3 – 1	(Russia) Medik Soch	Sochi, Russia
(UTC+4)	Kozlov; Logua; Ryzhov	Report	Goal

26 January 2020	Ararat Yerevan (Armenia)	9 – 0	(Mongolia) Ulaanbaatar	Sochi, Russia
(UTC+4)	Arshakyan; Logua; Spychka; Isayev	Report

28 January 2020	Ararat Yerevan (Armenia)	1 – 2	(Russia) Volgar Astrakhan	Sochi, Russia
13:00 (UTC+4)	30' (o.g.)	Report	Vorobyov 11'; Zenin 26'

9 February 2020	Ararat Yerevan (Armenia)	4 – 2	(Russia)	Sochi, Russia
(UTC+4)		Report

13 February 2020	Ararat Yerevan (Armenia)	–	(Romania) Miercurea Ciuc	Sochi, Russia
17:00 (UTC+4)		Report

13 February 2020	Ararat Yerevan (Armenia)	3 – 1	(Russia) Dolgoprudny	Sochi, Russia
17:00 (UTC+4)	A.Kalaydzhyan; Dedechko; Trialist	Report	Goal

16 February 2020	Ararat Yerevan (Armenia)	1 – 3	(Russia) Spartak Moscow	Sochi, Russia
15:00 (UTC+4)	Weslen 23'	Report	Ponce 18'; Zobnin 68'; Larsson 89'

24 February 2020	Ararat Yerevan	4 – 1	West Armenia	Kajaran
14:00 (UTC+4)	Ryzhov; Khurtsidze; Weslen	Report	Goal

6 May 2020	Ararat Yerevan	2 – 2	Masis	Dzoraghbyur
16:00 (UTC+4)	Badoyan; Khurtsidze	Report	Goal	Stadium: Dzoraghbyur Training Centre

9 May 2020	Ararat Yerevan	2 – 0	Gandzasar Kapan	Dzoraghbyur
16:00 (UTC+4)	Stepanets; Dedechko	Report		Stadium: Dzoraghbyur Training Centre

16 May 2020	Ararat Yerevan	3 – 5	Lokomotiv Yerevan	Yerevan
16:00 (UTC+4)	Goal	Report	Hluschuk; Kopytov; Maxim Pryadu; Igor Bikovsky; Karapet Manukyan	Stadium: Yerevan Football Academy Stadium; Attendance: 0

== Competitions ==
=== Armenian Premier League ===
==== Regular season ====
===== Results summary =====
Overall								Home						Away					
Pld	W	D	L	GF	GA	GD	Pts	W	D	L	GF	GA	GD	W	D	L	GF	GA	GD
18	9	4	5	25	18	+7	31	5	3	1	11	8	+3	4	1	4	14	10	+4

Last updated: 25 May 2020.
Source: See Results

===== Results =====
2 August 2019 1	Ararat Yerevan	1 – 0	Yerevan	Yerevan
19:30 (UTC+4)	Khurtsidze 60'; Kalaydzhyan (yellow card) 90'	Report	E.Evgenev (yellow card) 34'; A.Hovsepyan (yellow card) 85'	Stadium: Vazgen Sargsyan Republican Stadium; Attendance: 150; Referee: Ashot Ghaltakchyan

9 August 2019 2	Ararat Yerevan	2 – 1	Shirak	Yerevan
19:30 (UTC+4)	Dedechko 57' (yellow card) 79'; P.Ayvazyan (yellow card) 67'; Kozlov 88'	Report	Gevorkyan (yellow card) 42'; M.Bakayoko 55'; Mkoyan (red card) 67'	Stadium: Vazgen Sargsyan Republican Stadium; Attendance: 700; Referee: Ashot Ghaltakchyan

19 August 2019 3	Pyunik	1 – 4	Ararat Yerevan	Yerevan
19:15 (UTC+4)	Simonyan 65'; Belov (yellow card) 75'	Report	João Victor (yellow card) 16'; Dedechko 45', 85'; Morozov (yellow card) 45'; Khurtsidze (yellow card) 71'; Badoyan 79'; Weslen 90+2'	Stadium: Yerevan Football Academy Stadium; Attendance: 820; Referee: Suren Baliyan

26 August 2019 4	Ararat Yerevan	1 – 1	Alashkert	Yerevan
19:15 (UTC+4)	Kalaydzhyan (yellow card) 33'; Davidyan (yellow card) 42' (yellow-red card) 74'; João Victor (yellow card) 44'; Spychka (yellow card) 50'; Ryzhov 84'	Report	Thiago Galvão 45' (pen.); Ishkhanyan (yellow card) 86'	Stadium: Yerevan Football Academy Stadium; Attendance: 200; Referee: Gevorg Eghoyan

31 August 2019 5	Gandzasar Kapan	0 – 1	Ararat Yerevan	Yerevan
18:00 (UTC+4)	E.Yeghiazaryan (yellow card) 45'; A.Zoko (yellow card) 57'; Wbeymar (yellow card) 90+3'	Report	Weslen (yellow card) 33'; Khurtsidze 52'; Kozlov (yellow card) 73'; Revyakin (yellow card) 90+3'	Stadium: Yerevan Football Academy Stadium; Attendance: 200; Referee: Zaven Hovhannisyan
Note: Match played at the Yerevan Football Academy in Yerevan, instead of Gandzasar Kapan regular Gandzasar Stadium in Kapan.

15 September 2019 6	Ararat Yerevan	1 – 0	Noah	Yerevan
16:15 (UTC+4)	Morozov (yellow card) 22'; Dedechko (yellow card) 44' (yellow-red card) 58'; G.Chelidze 47' (yellow card) 57'; Spychka (yellow card) 71'; Kozlov (yellow card) 90+6'	Report	K.Harutyunyan (yellow card) 72'	Stadium: Vazgen Sargsyan Republican Stadium; Attendance: 500; Referee: Artur Safaryan

18 September 2019 7	Ararat-Armenia	1 – 0	Ararat Yerevan	Yerevan
17:30 (UTC+4)	Mailson (yellow card) 25' (goal) 66'	Report	Davidyan (yellow card) 41'; Morozov (yellow card) 51'; Kozlov (yellow card) 61'; Aleksanyan (yellow card) 82'	Stadium: Yerevan Football Academy Stadium; Attendance: 300; Referee: Zaven Hovhannisyan

22 September 2019 8	Lori	1 – 4	Ararat Yerevan	Vanadzor
16::00 (UTC+4)	A.Oura (yellow card) 74'; A.Yeoule 85'	Report	Davidyan 9'; Aleksanyan (yellow card) 40'; Arshakyan 55'; Kozlov 66' (yellow card) 71'; Morozov (yellow card) 76'; Weslen 88'	Stadium: Vanadzor Football Academy; Attendance: 550; Referee: Henrik Nalbandyan

29 September 2019 9	Urartu	1 – 0	Ararat Yerevan	Yerevan
19:00 (UTC+4)	Nikolić (yellow card) 57' (goal) 79'	Report	Davidyan (yellow card) 88'; Dedechko (yellow card) 90+3'	Stadium: Urartu Stadium; Attendance: 500; Referee: Artur Simonyan

4 October 2019 10	Yerevan	1 – 3	Ararat Yerevan	Vanadzor
15:00 (UTC+4)	Y.Yevgenyev (yellow card) 18'; Isayev 55'	Report	Logua 15'; Dedechko (yellow card) 32'; Kozlov 45+1'; Badoyan 84'; Toboyev (yellow card) 84'	Stadium: Vanadzor City Stadium; Attendance: 50; Referee: Shahen Aghayan
Note: Match played at the Vanadzor City Stadium in Vanadzor, instead of Yerevan's regular Vazgen Sargsyan Republican Stadium in Yerevan.

19 October 2019 11	Shirak	2 – 1	Ararat Yerevan	Gyumri
15:00 (UTC+4)	M.Kone 23'; R.Misakyan (yellow card) 28'; Prljević (yellow card) 59' (yellow-red card) 69'; A.Muradyan 88'; Mikaelyan (yellow card) 90+3'	Report	Morozov (yellow card) 14'; Aleksanyan (yellow card) 30'; Spychka (yellow card) 35'; Weslen 55'; Kozlov (yellow card) 84'; Revyakin (yellow card) 90+1'; G.Chelidze (yellow card) 90+3'	Stadium: Gyumri City Stadium; Attendance: 500; Referee: Gevorg Eghoyan

27 October 2019 12	Ararat Yerevan	4 – 2	Pyunik	Yerevan
16:00 (UTC+4)	Toboyev (yellow card) 24'; Dedechko (yellow card) 31' (goal) 45+1'; Weslen 54'; Khurtsidze 58'; João Victor (yellow card) 66'; Spychka (yellow card) 81'; Aleksanyan 90+1' (pen.) (yellow card) 90+2'	Report	Mahmudov 22'; U.Iwu (yellow card) 45'; Vardanyan (red card) 67'; Stankov 90+3'; Grigoryan (yellow card) 90+4'	Stadium: Vazgen Sargsyan Republican Stadium; Attendance: 500; Referee: Henrik Nalbandyan

9 November 2019 13	Alashkert	1 – 1	Ararat Yerevan	Yerevan
14:00 (UTC+4)	Thiago Galvão 45+1' (pen.); V.Hayrapetyan (yellow card) 52'; Grigoryan (yellow card) 69'; Daghbashyan (yellow card) 89'; Baranov (yellow card) 90+1'	Report	Aleksanyan 4' (pen.) (yellow card) 16'; Dedechko (yellow card) 26'; Logua (yellow card) 28'; Balyaikin (yellow card) 45'	Stadium: Alashkert Stadium; Attendance: 150; Referee: Suren Baliyan

22 November 2019 14	Ararat Yerevan	1 – 1	Gandzasar Kapan	Yerevan
18:00 (UTC+4)	Weslen (yellow card) 40'; João Victor (yellow card) 88'; Kozlov 90+2' (pen.) (yellow card) 90+4'; Davidyan (yellow card) 90+4'	Report	E.Yeghiazaryan 16'; G.Nranyan (yellow card) 90+2'	Stadium: Vazgen Sargsyan Republican Stadium; Attendance: 110; Referee: Artur Simonyan

2 December 2019 15	Noah	2 – 0	Ararat Yerevan	Yerevan
14:00 (UTC+4)	Kovalenko (yellow card) 13' (yellow-red card) 72'; K.Bor (yellow card) 26'; Mayrovich 45+3'; A.Tatayev (yellow card) 47'; Kryuchkov (yellow card) 55'; V.Vimercati (yellow card) 80'; Lavrishchev 85'	Report	Khurtsidze (yellow card) 90+4'	Stadium: Alashkert Stadium; Attendance: 120; Referee: Edgar Sahakyan
Note: Match played at the Alashkert Stadium in Yerevan, instead of Noah's regular Mika Stadium in Yerevan.

2 March 2020 16	Ararat Yerevan	0 – 3	Ararat-Armenia	Yerevan
14:45 (UTC+4)	James (yellow card) 77'	Report	Otubanjo 7', 17'; Ambartsumyan 35' (yellow card) 84'	Stadium: Vazgen Sargsyan Republican Stadium; Attendance: 300

8 March 2020 17	Ararat Yerevan	0 – 0	Lori	Gyumri
14:45 (UTC+4)	Phibel (red card) 23'; Khurtsidze (yellow card) 33'; Spychka (yellow card) 57'; Weslen (yellow card) 84'	Report	J.Ufuoma (yellow card) 15'; A.Avagyan (yellow card) 32' (yellow-red card) 33'; A.Yeoule (yellow card) 41'; Alexis (yellow card) 77'; C.Jiménez (yellow card) 84'	Stadium: Gyumri City Stadium; Attendance: 400; Referee: Gevorg Eghoyan
Note: Match played at the Gyumri City Stadium in Gyumri, instead of Ararat Yerevan's regular Vazgen Sargsyan Republican Stadium in Yerevan.

25 May 2020 18	Ararat Yerevan	1 – 0	Urartu	Yerevan
18:30 (UTC+4)	Weslen (yellow card) 28'; Vitinho (yellow card) 45'; Khurtsidze 54'; Rafinha (yellow card) 57'; Haruna (yellow card) 59'; Dedechko (yellow card) 90+5'	Report	J.Grgec (yellow card) 79'	Stadium: Yerevan Football Academy Stadium; Attendance: 0 Referee: Shahen Aghayan
Note: Match played behind closed doors. Match was originally scheduled for 16 March, but postponed on 13 March due to the COVID-19 pandemic.

===== Table =====
Pos	Team	Pld	W	D	L	GF	GA	GD	Pts	Qualification
1	Ararat-Armenia	18	11	3	4	33	15	+18	36	Qualification for the Championship round
2	Lori	18	9	5	4	27	19	+8	32	Qualification for the Championship round
3	Alashkert	18	9	4	5	33	20	+13	31	Qualification for the Championship round
4	Ararat	18	9	4	5	25	18	+7	31	Qualification for the Championship round
5	Noah	18	9	3	6	25	19	+6	30	Qualification for the Championship round
6	Shirak	18	8	4	6	25	18	+7	28	Qualification for the Championship round
7	Pyunik	18	7	2	9	35	36	−1	23	Qualification for the Relegation round
8	Urartu	18	6	5	7	22	24	−2	23	Qualification for the Relegation round
9	Gandzasar	18	4	6	8	20	25	−5	18	Qualification for the Relegation round
10	Yerevan (R, D)	18	0	0	18	11	62	−51	0	Withdrawn

Source: Soccerway
Rules for classification: 1) Points; 2) Play-off (only if deciding champion); 3) Matches won; 4) Head-to-head points; 5) Head-to-head matches won; 6) Head-to-head goal difference; 7) Head-to-head goals scored; 8) Head-to-head away goals scored; 9) Goal difference; 10) Goals scored.
(D) Disqualified; (R) Relegated

==== Championship round ====
===== Results summary =====
Overall								Home						Away					
Pld	W	D	L	GF	GA	GD	Pts	W	D	L	GF	GA	GD	W	D	L	GF	GA	GD
9	0	2	7	6	18	−12	2	0	2	3	3	9	−6	0	0	4	3	9	−6

Last updated: 10 July 2020.
Source: See Results

===== Results =====
31 May 2020 19	Alashkert	2 – 1	Ararat Yerevan	Yerevan
16:45 (UTC+4)	Glišić 19'; Mitrevski 42'; N.Tankov (yellow card) 45'; V.Hayrapetyan (red card) 54'; Daghbashyan (yellow card) 68'; Gome (yellow card) 71'	Report	James (yellow card) 28'; Dedechko 56' (pen.)	Stadium: Alashkert Stadium; Attendance: 0 Referee: Shahen Aghayan
Note: Match played behind closed doors due to the COVID-19 pandemic.

4 June 2020 20	Shirak	2 – 0	Ararat Yerevan	Gyumri
18:30 (UTC+4)	Malakyan (yellow card) 36'; Udo 55'; M.Kone 82'	Report	Rafinha (yellow card) 41'; Spychka (yellow card) 63'; Khurtsidze (yellow card) 77'	Stadium: Gyumri City Stadium; Attendance: 0 Referee: Artur Safaryan
Note: Match played behind closed doors due to the COVID-19 pandemic.

7 June 2020 21	Ararat Yerevan	0 – 0	Noah	Yerevan
19:00 (UTC+4)	Oseni (yellow card) 6'; Rafinha (yellow card) 40'; Dedechko (yellow card) 40'; James (yellow card) 63'	Report	A.Tatayev (red card) 12'	Stadium: Yerevan Football Academy Stadium; Attendance: 0 Referee: Ashot Ghaltakchyan
Note: Match played behind closed doors due to the COVID-19 pandemic.

11 June 2020 22	Ararat-Armenia	4 – 2	Ararat Yerevan	Yerevan
19:30 (UTC+4)	Vakulenko 22'; Harutyunyan (yellow card) 39'; Mailson 45', 90+4' (yellow card) 68'; Otubanjo 51' (pen.) (yellow card) 63'; Christian (yellow card) 72'; Malakyan (yellow card) 85'	Report	Dedechko 11'; Stepanets (yellow card) 41'; James (yellow card) 48'; Gouffran 56' (o.g.); Spychka (yellow card) 61'; Khurtsidze (yellow card) 90+4'	Stadium: Yerevan Football Academy Stadium; Attendance: 0 Referee: Artur Safaryan
Note: Match played behind closed doors due to the COVID-19 pandemic.

16 June 2020 23	Ararat Yerevan	1 – 1	Lori	Yerevan
19:45 (UTC+4)	D.Davidyan (yellow card) 42'; Arziani (yellow card) 48'; Isayev (yellow card) 69'; Stepanets (yellow card) 90+5'	Report	A.Yeoule (yellow card) 29'; M.Manasyan (yellow card) 53'; U.Iwu 68'	Stadium: Yerevan Football Academy Stadium; Attendance: 0 Referee: Zaven Hovhannisyan
Note: Match played behind closed doors due to the COVID-19 pandemic.

21 June 2020 24	Ararat Yerevan	1 – 3	Alashkert	Yerevan
19:30 (UTC+4)	Vitinho (yellow card) 21'; Spychka 35'; R.Hakobyan (yellow card) 70'	Report	Tiago Cametá (red card) 16'; Glišić (yellow card) 20' (goal) 43', 68'; Mitrevski 45'; Grigoryan (yellow card) 82'	Stadium: Yerevan Football Academy Stadium; Attendance: 0 Referee: Ashot Ghaltakchyan
Note: Match played behind closed doors due to the COVID-19 pandemic.

27 June 2020 25	Ararat Yerevan	1 – 4	Shirak	Yerevan
19:00 (UTC+4)	Badoyan 24'; Rafinha (yellow card) 73'	Report	Z.Margaryan 26', 90+3'; A.Gevorkyan (yellow card) 38'; M.Kone 55', 84'; Malakyan (yellow card) 63'	Stadium: Yerevan Football Academy Stadium; Attendance: 0 Referee: Vardan Manukyan
Note: Match played behind closed doors due to the COVID-19 pandemic.

2 July 2020 26	Noah	1 – 0	Ararat Yerevan	Yerevan
18:00 (UTC+4)	H.Manga (yellow card) 56'; Azarov 63' (yellow card) 90+3'	Report	Stepanets (yellow card) 90'	Stadium: Alashkert Stadium; Attendance: 0 Referee: Ashot Ghaltakchyan
Note: Match played behind closed doors due to the COVID-19 pandemic.

6 July 2020 27	Ararat Yerevan	0 – 1	Ararat-Armenia	Yerevan
20:00 (UTC+4)	Spychka (yellow card) 7'; Stepanets (yellow card) 45'; James (yellow card) 52'; Revyakin (yellow card) 85'	Report	Malakyan (yellow card) 48'; Gouffran (yellow card) 49'; A.Khachumyan (yellow card) 67'; Otubanjo 88'; Antonov (yellow card) 90+5'	Stadium: Yerevan Football Academy Stadium; Attendance: 0 Referee: Ashot Ghaltakchyan
Note: Match played behind closed doors due to the COVID-19 pandemic.

14 July 2020 28	Lori	v	Ararat Yerevan	Vanadzor
17:30 (UTC+4)				Stadium: Vanadzor Football Academy
Note: Match cancelled on 10 July due to COVID-19 within the Lori squad, with the points not being awarded.

===== Table =====
Pos	Team	Pld	W	D	L	GF	GA	GD	Pts	Qualification
1	Ararat-Armenia (C)	28	15	7	6	45	23	+22	52	Qualification for the Champions League first qualifying round
2	Noah	28	14	6	8	37	27	+10	48	Qualification for the Europa League first qualifying round (Note: team qualified for the Europa League first qualifying round by winning the 2019–20 Armenian Cup.)
3	Alashkert	28	14	5	9	51	31	+20	47	Qualification for the Europa League first qualifying round
4	Shirak	28	13	7	8	40	30	+10	46	Qualification for the Europa League first qualifying round
5	Lori	27	10	10	7	35	33	+2	40	(Note: Match between Lori and Ararat Yerevan was cancelled on 10 July, with no points being awarded.)
6	Ararat	27	9	6	12	31	36	−5	33	(Note: Match between Lori and Ararat Yerevan was cancelled on 10 July, with no points being awarded.)

Source: Soccerway
Rules for classification: 1) Points; 2) Play-off (only if deciding champion); 3) Matches won; 4) Head-to-head points; 5) Head-to-head matches won; 6) Head-to-head goal difference; 7) Head-to-head goals scored; 8) Head-to-head away goals scored; 9) Goal difference; 10) Goals scored.
(C) Champions

=== Armenian Cup ===
3 November 2019 Second Round	Noah	1 – 0	Ararat Yerevan	Yerevan
16:00 (UTC+4)	Mayrovich 33'; Azarov (yellow card) 63'; Zaprudskikh (yellow card) 70'	Report	Balyaikin (yellow card) 74'	Stadium: Alashkert Stadium; Attendance: 400; Referee: Shahen Aghayan

== Statistics ==
As of match played 6 July 2020

=== Appearances and goals ===
No.	Pos	Nat	Player	Total		Premier League		Armenian Cup	
No.	Pos	Nat	Player	Apps	Goals	Apps	Goals	Apps	Goals
1	GK	(Russia) RUS	Sergei Revyakin	25	0	24	0	1	0
3	DF	(Brazil) BRA	João Victor	9	0	7+1	0	1	0
4	DF	(Russia) RUS	Arkadi Kalaydzhyan	11	0	8+3	0	0	0
5	MF	(Georgia (country)) GEO	Zurab Arziani	13	0	6+6	0	0+1	0
7	MF	(Russia) RUS	Aleksandr Kozlov	20	4	19	4	1	0
8	MF	(Armenia) ARM	Albert Mnatsakanyan	1	0	0+1	0	0	0
9	FW	(Russia) RUS	Georgy Chelidze	17	1	13+3	1	1	0
10	MF	(Armenia) ARM	Zaven Badoyan	22	3	7+14	3	0+1	0
11	FW	(Russia) RUS	Ramazan Isayev	9	1	0+9	1	0	0
12	GK	(Russia) RUS	Yevgeni Kobozev	3	0	3	0	0	0
14	MF	(Armenia) ARM	Ruslan Avagyan	1	0	0+1	0	0	0
15	DF	(Armenia) ARM	Vahe Muradyan	1	0	1	0	0	0
17	FW	(Portugal) POR	Sancidino Silva	2	0	0+2	0	0	0
18	MF	(Armenia) ARM	Karen Shirkhanyan	3	0	3	0	0	0
19	MF	(Armenia) ARM	Petros Afajanyan	1	0	0+1	0	0	0
23	DF	(Ukraine) UKR	Ivan Spychka	26	1	24+1	1	1	0
27	MF	(Russia) RUS	David Khurtsidze	27	4	26	4	1	0
29	MF	(Armenia) ARM	Petros Afajanyan	1	0	0+1	0	0	0
30	FW	(Nigeria) NGR	Ganiyu Oseni	8	0	5+3	0	0	0
31	MF	(Armenia) ARM	Davit Baghdasaryan	3	0	0+3	0	0	0
32	MF	(Ukraine) UKR	Pavlo Stepanets	10	0	10	0	0	0
34	DF	(Russia) RUS	Yevgeni Makeyev	8	0	8	0	0	0
36	DF	(Brazil) BRA	Rafinha	8	0	8	0	0	0
37	FW	(Russia) RUS	Dmitri Ryzhov	10	1	3+7	1	0	0
45	DF	(Guadeloupe) GLP	Thomas Phibel	8	0	6+2	0	0	0
66	DF	(Russia) RUS	Konstantin Morozov	18	0	14+3	0	1	0
69	MF	(Ukraine) UKR	Denys Dedechko	21	6	19+1	6	1	0
70	MF	(Nigeria) NGR	Lukman Haruna	5	0	4+1	0	0	0
77	MF	(Brazil) BRA	Vitinho	13	0	11+2	0	0	0
80	FW	(Brazil) BRA	Gabriel Silva	1	0	0+1	0	0	0
88	DF	(Brazil) BRA	James	14	0	14	0	0	0
90	FW	(Brazil) BRA	Weslen Júnior	25	4	15+9	4	0+1	0
94	FW	(Armenia) ARM	David Arshakyan	6	1	3+2	1	1	0
97	MF	(Russia) RUS	David Davidyan	20	1	18+1	1	1	0
99	FW	(Armenia) ARM	Razmik Hakobyan	3	0	1+2	0	0	0
Players who left Ararat Yerevan during the season:
11	MF	(Russia) RUS	Taymuraz Toboyev	5	0	1+4	0	0	0
15	MF	(Russia) RUS	Yevgeni Balyaikin	3	0	2	0	1	0
18	MF	(Russia) RUS	Irakli Logua	7	1	3+4	1	0	0
19	DF	(Armenia) ARM	Artak Aleksanyan	13	2	11+2	2	0	0
24	MF	(Ukraine) UKR	Sergey Karetnik	1	0	0+1	0	0	0
33	FW	(Russia) RUS	Denis Shevchuk	1	0	0+1	0	0	0

=== Goal scorers ===
Place	Position	Nation	Number	Name	Premier League	Armenian Cup	Total
1	MF	(Ukraine)	69	Denys Dedechko	6	0	6
2	FW	(Brazil)	90	Weslen Júnior	4	0	4
2	MF	(Russia)	7	Aleksandr Kozlov	4	0	4
2	MF	(Russia)	27	David Khurtsidze	4	0	4
5	MF	(Armenia)	10	Zaven Badoyan	3	0	3
6	DF	(Armenia)	19	Artak Aleksanyan	2	0	2
7	FW	(Russia)	37	Dmitri Ryzhov	1	0	1
7	FW	(Russia)	9	Georgy Chelidze	1	0	1
7	FW	(Russia)	97	David Davidyan	1	0	1
7	FW	(Armenia)	94	David Arshakyan	1	0	1
7	MF	(Russia)	18	Irakli Logua	1	0	1
7	FW	(Russia)	11	Ramazan Isayev	1	0	1
7	DF	(Ukraine)	23	Ivan Spychka	1	0	1
7				Own goal	1	0	1
				TOTALS	31	0	31

=== Clean sheets ===
Place	Position	Nation	Number	Name	Premier League	Armenian Cup	Total
1	GK	(Russia)	1	Sergei Revyakin	6	0	6
2	GK	(Russia)	12	Yevgeni Kobozev	1	0	1
				TOTALS	7	0	7

=== Disciplinary record ===
Number	Nation	Position	Name	Premier League		Armenian Cup		Total	
Number	Nation	Position	Name	Yellow card	Red card	Yellow card	Red card	Yellow card	Red card
1	(Russia)	GK	Sergei Revyakin	3	0	0	0	3	0
3	(Brazil)	DF	João Victor	4	0	0	0	4	0
4	(Russia)	DF	Arkadi Kalaydzhyan	2	0	0	0	2	0
5	(Georgia (country))	MF	Zurab Arziani	1	0	0	0	1	0
7	(Russia)	MF	Aleksandr Kozlov	6	0	0	0	6	0
9	(Russia)	FW	Georgy Chelidze	2	0	0	0	2	0
23	(Ukraine)	DF	Ivan Spychka	8	0	0	0	8	0
27	(Russia)	MF	David Khurtsidze	5	0	0	0	5	0
30	(Nigeria)	FW	Ganiyu Oseni	1	0	0	0	1	0
32	(Ukraine)	MF	Pavlo Stepanets	4	0	0	0	4	0
36	(Brazil)	DF	Rafinha	4	0	0	0	4	0
45	(Guadeloupe)	DF	Thomas Phibel	0	1	0	0	0	1
66	(Russia)	DF	Konstantin Morozov	5	0	0	0	5	0
69	(Ukraine)	MF	Denys Dedechko	9	1	0	0	9	1
70	(Nigeria)	MF	Lukman Haruna	1	0	0	0	1	0
77	(Brazil)	DF	Vitinho	2	0	0	0	2	0
88	(Brazil)	DF	James	5	0	0	0	5	0
90	(Brazil)	FW	Weslen Júnior	4	0	0	0	4	0
97	(Russia)	FW	David Davidyan	6	1	0	0	6	1
98	(Armenia)	GK	Poghos Ayvazyan	1	0	0	0	1	0
99	(Armenia)	FW	Razmik Hakobyan	1	0	0	0	1	0
Players who left Ararat Yerevan during the season:
11	(Russia)	MF	Taymuraz Toboyev	2	0	0	0	2	0
15	(Russia)	MF	Yevgeni Balyaikin	1	0	1	0	2	0
18	(Russia)	MF	Irakli Logua	1	0	0	0	1	0
19	(Armenia)	DF	Artak Aleksanyan	5	0	0	0	5	0
			TOTALS	83	3	1	0	84	3
