= Artak =

Artak (Armenian: Արտակ) is an Armenian masculine given name of Iranian origin. Notable people called Artak include:

- Artak Aleksanyan (born 1991), Armenian football player
- Artak Apitonian (born 1971), Armenian diplomat
- Artak Dashyan (born 1989), Armenian football player
- Artak Davtyan (1966–2023), Armenian politician and economist
- Artak Davtyan (general) (born 1970), Armenian Major-General, currently 7th Chief of the General Staff of the Armenian Armed Forces
- Artak Ghulyan (1958–2025), Armenian architect and designer, professor of the International Academy of Architecture
- Artak Grigoryan (born 1987), Armenian football midfielder
- Artak Harutyunyan (born 1983), Armenian Greco Roman wrestler
- Artak Hovhannisyan (born 1993), Armenian freestyle wrestler
- Artak Malumyan, Armenian amateur boxer
- Artak Yedigaryan (born 1990), Armenian football player
- Artak Zeynalyan (born 1969), Armenian politician and lawyer

== See also ==
- Artakama, 4th-century Persian noblewoman
- Artakioi, Moesian tribe
- Artoces of Iberia, Georgian king
- Artsakh (disambiguation)
- Aryktakh, selo in Sakha Republic, Russia
- Atak (disambiguation)
