= 2022–23 FC Ararat Yerevan season =

Ararat Yerevan
2022–23 season
- President: Hrach Kaprielian
- Manager: Edgar Torosyan
- Stadium: Republican Stadium
- Premier League: 6th
- Armenian Cup: First Round vs Ararat-Armenia
- Europa Conference League: First Qualifying Round vs Shkëndija
- Top goalscorer: League: Razmik Hakobyan (7); All: Razmik Hakobyan (7)
Home colours	Away colours	Third colours

The 2022–23 season was FC Ararat Yerevan's 32nd consecutive season in Armenian Premier League, where they will also compete in the Armenian Cup and Europa Conference League.

== Season events ==
On 17 January, Serob Galstyan extended his contract with Ararat Yerevan until the summer of 2025.

On 4 February, Ararat Yerevan announced the signing of Mohamed Kone from Stade Lausanne Ouchy.

On 7 February, Ararat Yerevan announced the signing of Ibeh Ransom from Hapoel Nir Ramat HaSharon.

On 11 February, Dimitri Legbo was sold to Inter Turku.

On 16 February, Ararat Yerevan announced the signing of Kassim Hadji from Stade Nyonnais and Georgi Babaliev from Spartak Varna.

The following day, 17 February, Ararat Yerevan announced the signing of Dušan Mijić from Mladost Novi Sad, and the return of Sergei Revyakin who'd previously left Alashkert.

On 18 February, Ararat Yerevan announced the signings of Petros Afajanyan, Erik Azizyan and Aleksandr Ter-Tovmasyan.

On 6 March, Ararat Yerevan announced the signings of Ayman Mahmoud from Olympique Béja and free agent Teddy Mézague.

On 4 April, Ararat Yerevan announced the signing of Alassane Faye from Casa Sports.

== Squad ==
As of match played 6 June 2023

Number	Name	Nationality	Position	Date of birth (age)	Signed from	Signed in	Contract ends	Apps.	Goals
Goalkeepers
1	Gor Manukyan	(Armenia)	GK	27 September 1993 (aged 29)	Lernayin Artsakh	2022		6	0
71	Sergei Revyakin	(Russia)	GK	2 April 1995 (aged 28)	Unattached	2023		34	0
98	Nemanja Lemajic	(Montenegro)	GK	14 May 1998 (aged 25)	Arsenal Tivat	2022		3	0
Defenders
2	Ayman Mahmoud	(Tunisia)	DF	24 April 1996 (aged 27)	Olympique Béja	2023		9	1
4	Teddy Mézague	(France)	DF	27 May 1990 (aged 33)	Unattached	2023		9	1
5	Hrayr Mkoyan	(Armenia)	DF	2 September 1986 (aged 36)	Shirak	2020			
6	Hayk Ishkhanyan	(Armenia)	DF	24 June 1989 (aged 33)	BKMA Yerevan	2022		28	0
8	Vardan Arzoyan	(Armenia)	DF	24 June 1989 (aged 33)	Unattached	2022		85	2
21	Serob Galstyan	(Armenia)	DF	23 September 2002 (aged 20)	Torpedo Yerevan	2020	2025	34	1
22	Dušan Mijić	(Serbia)	DF	22 June 1993 (aged 29)	FK Mladost Novi Sad	2023		15	2
33	Hovhannes Nazaryan	(Armenia)	DF	11 March 1998 (aged 25)	Shirak	2021		26	2
96	Arman Hovhannisyan	(Armenia)	DF	7 July 1993 (aged 29)	Ararat-Armenia	2023		6	0
Midfielders
14	Petros Afajanyan	(Armenia)	MF	31 October 1998 (aged 24)	Unattached	2023		7	0
15	Erik Azizyan	(Armenia)	MF	4 March 2000 (aged 23)	Unattached	2023		3	0
19	Alassane Faye	(Senegal)	MF	28 September 2003 (aged 19)	Casa Sports	2023		9	0
20	Rudik Mkrtchyan	(Armenia)	MF	26 October 1998 (aged 24)	Shirak	2021		61	4
23	Gor Malakyan	(Armenia)	MF	12 June 1994 (aged 28)	Pyunik	2021		61	3
25	Armand Dagrou	(Ivory Coast)	MF	30 June 2000 (aged 22)	RC Abidjan	2021		27	1
32	Eduard Galstyan	(Armenia)	MF	1 May 2004 (aged 19)	Youth team	2022		2	0
70	Sosthène Tiehide	(Ivory Coast)	MF	10 January 2002 (aged 21)	RC Abidjan	2021		10	0
81	Kassim Hadji	(Comoros)	MF	23 March 2000 (aged 23)	Stade Nyonnais	2023		14	2
Forwards
7	Mohamed Kone	(Ivory Coast)	FW	7 August 2003 (aged 19)	Stade Lausanne Ouchy	2023		10	0
9	Razmik Hakobyan	(Armenia)	FW	9 February 1996 (aged 27)	Alashkert	2018		79	11
10	Aleksandar Glišić	(Bosnia and Herzegovina)	FW	3 September 1992 (aged 30)	Dinamo Samarqand	2022		20	3
11	Aleksandr Ter-Tovmasyan	(Armenia)	FW	1 June 2003 (aged 20)	Alashkert	2023		0	0
24	Hadji Issa Moustapha	(Cameroon)	FW	4 December 2003 (aged 19)	Gazelle FA de Garoua	2023		12	0
30	Ibeh Ransom	(Nigeria)	FW	29 June 2003 (aged 19)	Hapoel Nir Ramat HaSharon	2023		14	3
45	Amara Traoré	(Ivory Coast)	FW	2 January 2001 (aged 22)	RC Abidjan	2021		29	3
77	Georgi Babaliev	(Bulgaria)	FW	14 May 2001 (aged 22)	Spartak Varna	2023		8	0
Players away on loan
Players who left during the season
2	Robert Hakobyan	(Armenia)	DF	22 October 1996 (aged 26)	Shirak	2021		20	1
4	Yuri Magakyan	(Armenia)	DF	22 June 2000 (aged 22)	Youth team	2016		5	0
7	Isah Aliyu	(Nigeria)	MF	8 August 1999 (aged 23)	Urartu	2021		54	3
11	David Manoyan	(Armenia)	MF	5 July 1990 (aged 32)	Shirak	2020		89	2
13	Arman Simonyan	(Armenia)	GK	28 July 1997 (aged 25)	Unattached	2019		0	0
17	Timur Pukhov	(Russia)	MF	17 June 1998 (aged 24)	Amkar Perm	2022		7	0
18	Edgar Malakyan	(Armenia)	MF	22 September 1990 (aged 32)	Shirak	2020		69	11
22	Arman Mkrtchyan	(Armenia)	DF	22 October 1996 (aged 26)	Noravank	2022		15	0
24	Dimitri Legbo	(Ivory Coast)	DF	29 August 2001 (aged 21)	RC Abidjan	2021		35	1
26	Alik Arakelyan	(Armenia)	MF	21 May 1996 (aged 27)	Pyunik	2021		51	4
27	Iván Díaz	(Argentina)	MF	23 January 1993 (aged 30)	Sereď	2021		34	0
28	Artyom Potapov	(Russia)	GK	28 June 1994 (aged 28)	Alashkert	2022		21	0
29	Marko Prljević	(Serbia)	DF	2 August 1988 (aged 34)	Shirak	2020		54	3
44	Juan Bravo	(Colombia)	DF	1 April 1990 (aged 33)	Sportivo Barracas	2020		77	5
55	Babu Cham	(The Gambia)	MF	3 March 1999 (aged 24)	Noravank	2022		10	0
99	Robert Darbinyan	(Armenia)	DF	4 October 1995 (aged 27)	Pyunik	2021		36	0

== Transfers ==
=== In ===
Date	Position	Nationality	Name	From	Fee	Ref.
2 June 2022	MF	(The Gambia)	Babou Cham	Noravank	Undisclosed	
3 June 2022	GK	(Russia)	Artyom Potapov	Alashkert	Undisclosed	
10 June 2022	GK	(Armenia)	Gor Manukyan	Lernayin Artsakh	Undisclosed	
14 June 2022	FW	(Bosnia and Herzegovina)	Aleksandar Glišić	Dinamo Samarqand	Undisclosed	
15 June 2022	DF	(Armenia)	Vardan Arzoyan	Unattached	Free	
17 June 2022	DF	(Armenia)	Gevorg Arabyan	Shirak	Undisclosed	
17 June 2022	MF	(Switzerland)	Drilon Kastrati	Schaffhausen	Undisclosed	
18 June 2022	DF	(Armenia)	Arman Mkrtchyan	Noravank	Undisclosed	
27 June 2022	DF	(Armenia)	Hayk Ishkhanyan	BKMA Yerevan	Undisclosed	
1 July 2022	DF	(Armenia)	Serob Galstyan	BKMA Yerevan	Undisclosed	
12 July 2022	GK	(Montenegro)	Nemanja Lemajic	Arsenal Tivat	Undisclosed	
4 February 2023	FW	(Ivory Coast)	Mohamed Kone	Stade Lausanne Ouchy	Undisclosed	
7 February 2023	FW	(Nigeria)	Ibeh Ransom	Hapoel Nir Ramat HaSharon	Undisclosed	
16 February 2023	MF	(Comoros)	Kassim Hadji	Stade Nyonnais	Undisclosed	
16 February 2023	FW	(Bulgaria)	Georgi Babaliev	Spartak Varna	Undisclosed	
17 February 2023	GK	(Russia)	Sergei Revyakin	Unattached	Free	
17 February 2023	DF	(Serbia)	Dušan Mijić	Mladost Novi Sad	Undisclosed	
18 February 2023	MF	(Armenia)	Petros Afajanyan	Unattached	Free	
18 February 2023	MF	(Armenia)	Erik Azizyan	Unattached	Free	
18 February 2023	FW	(Armenia)	Aleksandr Ter-Tovmasyan	Alashkert	Undisclosed	
17 February 2023	DF	(Serbia)	Dušan Mijić	Mladost Novi Sad	Undisclosed	
6 March 2023	DF	(France)	Teddy Mézague	Unattached	Free	
6 March 2023	DF	(Tunisia)	Ayman Mahmoud	Olympique Béja	Undisclosed	
4 April 2023	MF	(Senegal)	Alassane Faye	Casa Sports	Undisclosed	

=== Out ===
Date	Position	Nationality	Name	To	Fee	Ref.
11 February 2023	DF	(Ivory Coast)	Dimitri Legbo	Inter Turku	Undisclosed	

=== Released ===
Date	Position	Nationality	Name	Joined	Date	Ref.
6 June 2022	GK	(Armenia)	Poghos Ayvazyan	Shirak		
6 June 2022	DF	(Armenia)	Robert Hakobyan	Shirak		
6 June 2022	GK	(Russia)	Vsevolod Yermakov	Ararat-Armenia	10 June 2022	
17 July 2022	MF	(Serbia)	Igor Stanojević	Inđija		
1 August 2022	MF	(Argentina)	Iván Díaz	GS Ilioupolis		
2 August 2022	DF	(Serbia)	Marko Prljević	Shirak	2 August 2023	
10 December 2022	GK	(Russia)	Artyom Potapov	Surkhon Termez		
10 December 2022	DF	(Armenia)	Arman Mkrtchyan	Van	27 January 2023	
10 December 2022	DF	(Colombia)	Juan Bravo	Pyunik	7 February 2023	
10 December 2022	MF	(Armenia)	Alik Arakelyan	Lernayin Artsakh	27 February 2023	
10 December 2022	MF	(Armenia)	Edgar Malakyan	Pyunik	12 January 2023	
10 December 2022	MF	(The Gambia)	Babu Cham	Paide Linnameeskond	13 March 2023	
10 December 2022	MF	(Russia)	Timur Pukhov	Naftan Novopolotsk	17 March 2023	
9 January 2023	DF	(Armenia)	Gevorg Arabyan			
9 January 2023	DF	(Armenia)	Robert Darbinyan	Shirak	30 January 2023	
9 January 2023	MF	(Nigeria)	Isah Aliyu	Remo Stars	24 March 2023	
23 February 2023	MF	(Armenia)	David Manoyan	Van	29 March 2023	
28 February 2023	DF	(Armenia)	Yuri Maghakyan	Syunik		
1 March 2023	GK	(Armenia)	Arman Simonyan	Noah	3 March 2023	

== Friendlies ==
21 January 2023	Ararat Yerevan	2–2	Shirak	Dzoraghbyur
13:00 (UTC+4)	A.Traoré 19'; Glišić 85'	Report	58'; 90+2'	Stadium: Dzoraghbyur Training Centre

28 January 2023	BKMA Yerevan	2–3	Ararat Yerevan	Dzoraghbyur
14:30 (UTC+4)	17'; 20'	Report	Trialist 67', 75', 86'	Stadium: Dzoraghbyur Training Centre

5 February 2023	Ararat Yerevan	3–3	Noah	Dzoraghbyur
13:00 (UTC+4)	M.Kone 7', 45'; Glišić 65'	Report	K.Muradyan 21'; G.Igbokwe 41'; Trialist 75'	Stadium: Dzoraghbyur Training Centre

16 February 2023	Ararat Yerevan	3–3	Van	Dzoraghbyur
13:00 (UTC+4)	M.Kone 22'; Glišić 35', 42'	Report	12'; 29'; 45+1'	Stadium: Dzoraghbyur Training Centre

21 February 2023	Ararat Yerevan	1–2	Alashkert	Dzoraghbyur
13:00 (UTC+4)	Babaliev 58'	Report	Pešić 62'; Miranyan 77'	Stadium: Dzoraghbyur Training Centre

== Competitions ==
=== Overall record ===
Competition	First match	Last match	Starting round	Final position	Record							
Competition	First match	Last match	Starting round	Final position	Pld	W	D	L	GF	GA	GD	Win %
Premier League	2 August 2022	6 June 2023	Matchday 1	6th	36	10	8	18	29	42	−13	27.78
Armenian Cup	4 October 2022	4 October 2022	First Round	Quarterfinal	1	0	0	1	0	4	−4	0.00
UEFA Europa Conference League	7 July 2022	14 July 2022	First qualifying round	First qualifying round	2	0	1	1	2	4	−2	0.00
Total					39	10	9	20	31	50	−19	25.64

Last updated: 6 June 2023
Source: Competitions

=== Premier League ===
==== Results summary ====
Overall								Home						Away					
Pld	W	D	L	GF	GA	GD	Pts	W	D	L	GF	GA	GD	W	D	L	GF	GA	GD
36	10	8	18	29	42	−13	38	5	4	9	13	22	−9	5	4	9	16	20	−4

Last updated: 6 June 2023.
Source: See Results

==== Results by round ====
Round	1	2	3	4	5	6	7	8	9	10	11	12	13	14	15	16	17	18	19	20	21	22	23	24	25	26	27	28	29	30	31	32	33	34	35	36
Ground	A	A	H	A	H	A	A	A	H	H	H	A	H	A	H	H	A	A	A	H	H	H	H	A	H	A	H	H	A	A	A	A	H	A	H	A
Result	W	L	L	D	W	D	L	L	L	W	L	L	L	W	W	D	D	L	L	W	L	L	L	L	W	W	D	L	L	L	D	L	W	W	D	D
Position	2	5	5	6	6	7	7	7	7	7	7	7	7	7	6	7	7	8	7	6	6	7	7	7	7	7	7	7	7	7	7	7	7	6	6	6

Updated to match(es) played on 6 June 2023. Source: See Results
A = Away; H = Home; W = Win; D = Draw; L = Loss; V = Void

==== Results ====
30 July 2022 1	Pyunik	0–1	Ararat Yerevan	Yerevan
20:00 (UTC+4)	González (yellow card) 23'; Nenadović (yellow card) 57'; Dashyan (yellow card) 74'; A.Avagyan (yellow card) 90+2'	Report	R.Mkrtchyan 71'; Potapov (yellow card) 88'; Manoyan (yellow card) 89'	Stadium: Republican Stadium; Referee: Zaven Hovhannisyan

6 August 2022 2	Alashkert	2–0	Ararat Yerevan	Yerevan
18:00 (UTC+4)	Hovsepyan (yellow card) 33'; Mensah (yellow card) 47'; Díaz 56'; Metoyan 89'	Report	G.Malakyan (yellow card) 45+2'	Stadium: Alashkert Stadium; Referee: Artem Gasparyan

11 August 2022 3	Ararat Yerevan	0–2	Ararat-Armenia	Yerevan
20:00 (UTC+4)	Mkoyan (yellow card) 12'	Report	Firmino 11'; Yenne 39'; Hakobyan (yellow card) 54'	Stadium: Republican Stadium; Referee: Henrik Nalbandian

20 August 2022 4	Shirak	0–0	Ararat Yerevan	Gyumri
17:00 (UTC+4)	Bakayoko (yellow card) 31'; Urushanyan (yellow card) 34'; Mryan (yellow card) 64'	Report	Bravo (yellow card) 37'; R.Mkrtchyan (yellow card) 56'; Ra.Hakobyan (yellow card) 77'	Stadium: City Stadium; Referee: Yura Mahtesyan

27 August 2022 5	Ararat Yerevan	1–0	Van	Yerevan
19:00 (UTC+4)	Mkoyan (yellow card) 5'; Arakelyan 28'; R.Mkrtchyan (yellow card) 45+1'; Potapov (yellow card) 90+1'	Report	Sani (yellow card) 72'; Boniface (yellow card) 84'; Asoyan (yellow card) 90+7'	Stadium: Republican Stadium; Referee: Ashot Ghaltakhchyan

3 September 2022 6	Noah	0–0	Ararat Yerevan	Armavir
17:00 (UTC+4)	Nesterov (yellow card) 60'; Ebenezer (yellow card) 76'	Report		Stadium: Armavir City Stadium; Referee: Davit Mkrtchyan

9 September 2022 7	Lernayin Artsakh	2–1	Ararat Yerevan	Vayk
16:00 (UTC+4)	Racines 33', 65' (yellow card) 62'; Kharatyan (yellow card) 86'	Report	A.Mkrtchyan (yellow card) 62'; Dagrou (yellow card) 79'; Ra.Hakobyan 77'; Bravo (yellow card) 86'	Stadium: Arevik Stadium; Referee: Vardan Manukyan

17 September 2022 8	BKMA Yerevan	2–1	Ararat Yerevan	Yerevan
15:00 (UTC+4)	Grigoryan (yellow card) 48'; Lulukyan 56'; Tarakhchyan 79'; Arzoyan (yellow card) 62'; Avagyan (yellow card) 90+2'	Report	Galstyan 26'; Bravo (yellow card) 51'; Arzoyan (yellow card) 62'	Stadium: FFA Stadium; Referee: Henrik Nalbandian

30 September 2022 9	Ararat Yerevan	0–2	Urartu	Yerevan
19:30 (UTC+4)	Ra.Hakobyan (yellow card) 55'; Galstyan (yellow card) 73'; Darbinyan (yellow card) 86'	Report	Tsymbalyuk (yellow card) 45+1'; Khlyobas 90' (yellow card) 90+1'; Sabua 90+4'; N.Grigoryan (yellow card) 90+4'	Stadium: Republican Stadium; Referee: Ashot Ghaltakhchyan

9 October 2022 10	Ararat Yerevan	1–0	Pyunik	Yerevan
18:00 (UTC+4)	R.Mkrtchyan 9'; G.Malakyan (yellow card) 45+1'; Potapov (yellow card) 90+1'	Report	Baranov (yellow card) 46'; Ristevski (yellow card) 90+6'	Stadium: Republican Stadium; Referee: Aertem Gasparyan

14 October 2022 11	Ararat Yerevan	0–1	Alashkert	Yerevan
16:00 (UTC+4)	R.Mkrtchyan (yellow card) 16'; G.Malakyan (yellow card) 45' (red card) 45+3'; Bravo (yellow card) 56'; Ishkhanyan (yellow card) 85'; Darbinyan (yellow card) 90+3'	Report	Galvão 3'; James (yellow card) 42'; Yedigaryan (red card) 45+3'; Metoyan (yellow card) 81'	Stadium: Republican Stadium; Referee: Ashot Ghaltakhchyan

21 October 2022 12	Ararat-Armenia	2–1	Ararat Yerevan	Yerevan
18:00 (UTC+4)	Eza 34'; Muradyan (yellow card) 40'; Yenne 89'	Report	R.Mkrtchyan 42'; A.Mkrtchyan (yellow card) 68'; Potapov (yellow card) 75'; Arzoyan (yellow card) 90+2'	Stadium: FFA Stadium; Referee: Vardan Manukyan

25 October 2022 13	Ararat Yerevan	0–1	Shirak	Yerevan
19:00 (UTC+4)	R.Mkrtchyan (yellow card) 28'; Pukhov (yellow card) 36'	Report	Bakayoko 32'; Misakyan (yellow card) 81'; Vidić (yellow card) 90+1' (yellow-red card) 90+1'; Ayvazyan (yellow card) 90+5'	Stadium: Republican Stadium; Referee: Vardan Manukyan

29 October 2022 14	Van	0–2	Ararat Yerevan	Charentsavan
15:00 (UTC+4)		Report	Traoré 28' (yellow card) 55'; Dagrou 37'; A.Mkrtchyan (yellow card) 51'	Stadium: Charentsavan City Stadium; Referee: Yura Mahtesyan

5 November 2022 15	Ararat Yerevan	2–1	Noah	Yerevan
17:00 (UTC+4)	Mkrtchyan 20' (yellow card) 83'; Traoré (yellow card) 47'; E.Malakyan 62' (pen.); Galstyan (yellow card) 88'	Report	Salou (yellow card) 37'; Vardanyan 65'	Stadium: Republican Stadium; Referee: Hovhannes Kalantaryan

12 November 2022 16	Ararat Yerevan	0–0	Lernayin Artsakh	Yerevan
19:00 (UTC+4)	E.Malakyan (yellow card) 67'; Mkoyan (yellow card) 76'	Report	Kharatyan (yellow card) 90+3'	Stadium: Republican Stadium; Referee: Zaven Hovhannisyan

22 November 2022 18	Urartu	2–1	Ararat Yerevan	Yerevan
18:00 (UTC+4)	Tsymbalyuk 6'; Melkonyan 34'	Report	Traoré 22'; Mkoyan (yellow card) 88' (red card) 88'	Stadium: Urartu Stadium; Referee: Artem Gasparyan

30 November 2022 19	Pyunik	2–0	Ararat Yerevan	Yerevan
17:00 (UTC+4)	Juričić 45'; Harutyunyan 71'; Bratkov (yellow card) 89'	Report	Aliyu (yellow card) 40'; Galstyan (yellow card) 60'; Bravo (yellow card) 89'; Ishkhanyan (yellow card) 90+5'	Stadium: Republican Stadium; Referee: Zaven Hovhannisyan

4 December 2022 20	Alashkert	0–1	Ararat Yerevan	Yerevan
14:00 (UTC+4)	Hovhannisyan (yellow card) 17'; Reyes (yellow card) 96'; Metoyan (yellow card) 80'; A.Voskanyan (yellow card) 89'	Report	Traoré 16'; R.Mkrtchyan (yellow card) 52'; Manukyan (yellow card) 90+2'	Stadium: Alashkert Stadium; Referee: Henrik Nalbandian

8 December 2022 17	Ararat Yerevan	0–0	BKMA Yerevan	Yerevan
18:00 (UTC+4)	Mkoyan (yellow card) 88'	Report	Tarakhchyan (yellow card) 72'	Stadium: Republican Stadium; Referee: Zaven Hovhannisyan

27 February 2023 21	Ararat Yerevan	1–3	Ararat-Armenia	Charentsavan
15:00 (UTC+4)	Mijić 29'; Babaliev (yellow card) 75'	Report	Pérez 31'; Alemão 37'; Grigoryan (yellow card) 65'; Jibril 78'	Stadium: Charentsavan City Stadium; Referee: Artem Gasparyan
Note: Match played at the Charentsavan City Stadium, Charentsavan, instead of Ararat Yerevan's regular Republican Stadium in Yerevan.

6 March 2023 22	Ararat Yerevan	1–2	Shirak	Charentsavan
18:00 (UTC+4)	M.Kone (yellow card) 67'; Galstyan (yellow card) 72'; Mijić (yellow card) 78'; Ra.Hakobyan 89'	Report	A.Koné 13'; Doumbia 26'; Kodia (yellow card) 60'	Stadium: Charentsavan City Stadium; Referee: Vardan Manukyan
Note: Match played at the Charentsavan City Stadium, Charentsavan, instead of Ararat Yerevan's regular Republican Stadium in Yerevan.

10 March 2023 23	Ararat Yerevan	1–3	Van	Charentsavan
18:00 (UTC+4)	G.Malakyan (yellow card) 61'; Arzoyan (yellow card) 75' (yellow-red card) 75'; Ra.Hakobyan 90+5'	Report	Moustapha 8' (o.g.); Cifuentes (yellow card) 37'; Hovsepyan 62' (pen.); Gaba (yellow card) 88'; Kadimyan 90+2'	Stadium: Charentsavan City Stadium; Referee: Zaven Hovhannisyan

18 March 2023 24	Noah	2–1	Ararat Yerevan	Armavir
15:00 (UTC+4)	Llovet 72'; Yesayan 90+5'	Report	Mijić 77'; Afajanyan (yellow card) 89'; Mahmoud (yellow card) 90+3'	Stadium: Armavir City Stadium; Referee: Yura Mahtesyan

31 March 2023 25	Ararat Yerevan	2–0	Lernayin Artsakh	Yerevan
19:00 (UTC+4)	Kone (yellow card) 45+4'; Glišić (yellow card) 47' (goal) 49'; Afajanyan (yellow card) 76'; Mijić (yellow card) 78'; Ra.Hakobyan 82' (pen.)	Report	Kharatyan (yellow card) 55'; Kostandyan (yellow card) 82'; Khachatryan (yellow card) 84'; Grigoryan (red card) 90+5'	Stadium: Republican Stadium; Referee: Davit Mkrtchyan

9 April 2023 26	BKMA Yerevan	0–1	Ararat Yerevan	Yerevan
18:00 (UTC+4)	Petrosyan (yellow card) 17'; Samsonyan (yellow card) 75'; Mkrtchyan (yellow card) 83'	Report	Mijić (yellow card) 13'; Ra.Hakobyan 59' (yellow card) 67'; Ransom (yellow card) 70'; Revyakin (yellow card) 90'	Stadium: FFA Stadium; Referee: Henrik Nalbandian

16 April 2023 27	Ararat Yerevan	0–0	Urartu	Yerevan
16:00 (UTC+4)	Mkoyan (yellow card) 90+4'	Report	Ghazaryan (yellow card) 37'; Zotko (yellow card) 67'	Stadium: Republican Stadium; Referee: Ashot Ghaltakhchyan

22 April 2023 28	Ararat Yerevan	0–2	Pyunik	Yerevan
15:00 (UTC+4)	Babaliev (yellow card) 41'; Ra.Hakobyan (yellow card) 90'; Faye (yellow card) 90+2'	Report	Juričić 5'; Miljković (yellow card) 52'; James 90+6'	Stadium: Republican Stadium; Referee: Yura Mahtesyan

26 April 2023 29	Ararat Yerevan	2–4	Alashkert	Yerevan
20:00 (UTC+4)	G.Malakyan (yellow card) 27'; Mahmoud 45+1'; Mkoyan (red card) 58'; Mijić (yellow card) 64'; Mézague 71'; Hovhannisyan (yellow card) 76'	Report	Miranyan 14', 43'; Racines 29'; Carrillo (yellow card) 41'; A.Grigoryan (yellow card) 81'; Mensah 85'; Čančarević (yellow card) 88'	Stadium: Republican Stadium; Referee: Vardan Manukyan

3 May 2023 30	Ararat-Armenia	2–1	Ararat Yerevan	Yerevan
19:00 (UTC+4)	Ambartsumyan 33'; Jibril 51'; Terteryan (yellow card) 64'; Ghazaryan (yellow card) 90+3'	Report	Mkrtchyan (yellow card) 40'; Ransom 45'; Dagrou (yellow card) 77'; Mézague (yellow card) 82'; Faye (yellow card) 83'	Stadium: FFA Stadium; Referee: Zaven Hovhannisyan

8 May 2023 31	Shirak	0–0	Ararat Yerevan	Gyumri
20:00 (UTC+4)	Sadoyan (yellow card) 59'; Kodia (yellow card) 82'	Report	Hadji (yellow card) 38'; Malakyan (yellow card) 61'; Faye (yellow card) 68'; Ra.Hakobyan (yellow card) 75'	Stadium: City Stadium; Referee: Artem Gasparyan

15 May 2023 32	Van	3–1	Ararat Yerevan	Charentsavan
16:00 (UTC+4)	Movsesyan 7'; Gorelov (yellow card) 70'; Hovsepyan 90+2'; Boniface 90+7'	Report	G.Malakyan (yellow card) 45+1'; Glišić 76' (yellow card) 77' (red card) 77'; Mkoyan (yellow card) 80' (red card) 80'	Stadium: Charentsavan City Stadium; Referee: Ashot Ghaltakhchyan

20 May 2023 33	Ararat Yerevan	1–0	Noah	Yerevan
19:00 (UTC+4)	Ransom (yellow card) 7'; Malakyan (yellow card) 42'; Hadji 47'; Revyakin (yellow card) 90+3'	Report	K.Muradyan (yellow card) 19'; Llovet (yellow card) 27'	Stadium: Republican Stadium; Referee: Zaven Hovhannisyan

25 May 2023 34	Lernayin Artsakh	0–3	Ararat Yerevan	Vayk
17:00 (UTC+4)	Bilunga (yellow card) 32'; Sow (yellow card) 40'; Adamyan (yellow card) 82'	Report	Faye (yellow card) 25'; Ransom 41' (pen.), 55'; Hadji 43'	Stadium: Arevik Stadium; Referee: Davit Mkrtchyan

30 May 2023 35	Ararat Yerevan	1–1	BKMA Yerevan	Yerevan
18:00 (UTC+4)	Moustapha (yellow card) 53'; R.Mkrtchyan (yellow card) 54'; Nazaryan (yellow card) 87'; Glišić 90+2' (pen.)	Report	G.Petrosyan (yellow card) 45+1'; Mirzoyan 55' (pen.); Nikoghosyan (yellow card) 53'	Stadium: Republican Stadium; Referee: Davit Mkrtchyan

6 June 2023 36	Urartu	1–1	Ararat Yerevan	Yerevan
17:00 (UTC+4)	Mayrovich 5'; Ayvazyan (yellow card) 23'; Carioca (yellow card) 44'; Marcos Júnior (yellow card) 68'; Ghazaryan (yellow card) 90+6'	Report	Ra.Hakobyan 24' (yellow card) 53'	Stadium: Urartu Stadium; Referee: Artem Gasparyan

==== Table ====
Pos	Team	Pld	W	D	L	GF	GA	GD	Pts	Qualification or relegation
1	Urartu (C)	36	26	5	5	68	25	+43	83	Qualification for the Champions League first qualifying round
2	Pyunik	36	25	5	6	72	23	+49	80	Qualification for the Europa Conference League first qualifying round (Note: The 2022–23 Armenian Cup winners qualified for the Europa Conference League first qualifying round. Since the cup winners (Urartu) qualified based on league position, the Europa Conference League spot was passed to the fourth-placed team.)
3	Ararat-Armenia	36	23	7	6	70	27	+43	76	Qualification for the Europa Conference League first qualifying round
4	Alashkert	36	20	6	10	58	37	+21	66	Qualification for the Europa Conference League first qualifying round
5	Van	36	11	7	18	38	59	−21	40	
6	Ararat Yerevan	36	10	8	18	29	42	−13	38	
7	Shirak	36	10	6	20	25	55	−30	36	
8	Noah	36	8	8	20	34	66	−32	32 (Note: Games won: Noah 8, BKMA 7.)	
9	BKMA	36	7	11	18	36	53	−17	32	
10	Lernayin Artsakh (R)	36	5	7	24	16	59	−43	22	Relegation to the Armenian First League

Source: FFA Soccerway
Rules for classification: 1) Points; 2) Head-to-head points; 3) Head-to-head goal difference; 4) Head-to-head goals scored; 5) Matches won; 6) Goal difference; 7) Less red cards; 8) Less yellow cards; 9) Fair-play ranking 10) Draw
(C) Champions; (R) Relegated

=== Armenian Cup ===
4 October 2022 First round	Ararat Yerevan	0–4	Ararat-Armenia	Armavir
15:00 (UTC+4)	Mkoyan (yellow card) 36'	Report	Eza 31', 54', 83'; Mkrtchyan (yellow card) 49'; Agdon 89'	Stadium: Armavir City Stadium; Referee: Davit Mkrtchyan

=== UEFA Europa Conference League ===
==== Qualifying rounds ====
7 July 2021 First qualifying round 1st leg	Shkëndija (North Macedonia)	2–0	(Armenia) Ararat Yerevan	Skopje, North Macedonia
22:00 (UTC+4)	Shala 21'; Dita (yellow card) 35'; Nafiu (yellow card) 40' (goal) 45'; Cake (yellow card) 44'; Ramadani (yellow card) 59'	Report	G.Malakyan (yellow card) 48'; Prljević (yellow card) 56'; Manoyan (yellow card) 63'	Stadium: Toše Proeski Arena; Attendance: 1,523; Referee: Lukas Fähndrich (Switzerland)
Note: Shkëndija played their home matches at the Toše Proeski Arena in Skopje, instead of their regular stadium, the Ecolog Arena, in Tetovo, which did not meet UEFA requirements.

14 July 2021 First qualifying round 2nd leg	Ararat Yerevan (Armenia)	2–2 (2–4 agg.)	(North Macedonia) Shkëndija	Yerevan, Armenia
19:00 (UTC+4)	Díaz (yellow card) 14'; G.Malakyan (yellow card) 27' (goal) 49', 79'; Ishkhanyan (yellow card) 31'	Report	Bravo 2' (o.g.); Hasani (yellow card) 44'; Guri 45+3'	Stadium: Vazgen Sargsyan Republican Stadium; Attendance: 2,850; Referee: Oleksii Derevinskyi (Ukraine)

== Statistics ==
As of match played 6 June 2023

=== Appearances and goals ===
No.	Pos	Nat	Player	Total		Premier League		Armenian Cup		UEFA Europa Conference League	
No.	Pos	Nat	Player	Apps	Goals	Apps	Goals	Apps	Goals	Apps	Goals
1	GK	(Armenia) ARM	Gor Manukyan	6	0	6	0	0	0	0	0
2	DF	(Tunisia) TUN	Ayman Mahmoud	9	1	9	1	0	0	0	0
4	DF	(France) FRA	Teddy Mézague	9	1	8+1	1	0	0	0	0
5	DF	(Armenia) ARM	Hrayr Mkoyan	32	0	29	0	1	0	2	0
6	DF	(Armenia) ARM	Hayk Ishkhanyan	28	0	25+1	0	1	0	1	0
7	FW	(Ivory Coast) CIV	Mohamed Kone	10	0	4+6	0	0	0	0	0
8	DF	(Armenia) ARM	Vardan Arzoyan	9	0	5+4	0	0	0	0	0
9	FW	(Armenia) ARM	Razmik Hakobyan	30	7	14+14	7	0	0	0+2	0
10	FW	(Bosnia and Herzegovina) BIH	Aleksandar Glišić	20	3	12+5	3	0+1	0	2	0
14	MF	(Armenia) ARM	Petros Afajanyan	7	0	1+6	0	0	0	0	0
15	MF	(Armenia) ARM	Erik Azizyan	3	0	0+3	0	0	0	0	0
19	MF	(Senegal) SEN	Alassane Faye	9	0	6+3	0	0	0	0	0
20	MF	(Armenia) ARM	Rudik Mkrtchyan	36	0	32+1	0	1	0	0+2	0
21	DF	(Armenia) ARM	Serob Galstyan	34	1	12+20	1	1	0	0+1	0
22	DF	(Serbia) SRB	Dušan Mijić	15	2	15	2	0	0	0	0
23	MF	(Armenia) ARM	Gor Malakyan	31	2	25+3	0	1	0	2	2
24	FW	(Cameroon) CMR	Hadji Issa Moustapha	12	0	7+5	0	0	0	0	0
25	MF	(Ivory Coast) CIV	Armand Dagrou	20	0	14+6	0	0	0	0	0
30	FW	(Nigeria) NGA	Ibeh Ransom	14	3	9+5	3	0	0	0	0
32	MF	(Armenia) ARM	Eduard Galstyan	2	0	0+2	0	0	0	0	0
33	DF	(Armenia) ARM	Hovhannes Nazaryan	5	0	2+3	0	0	0	0	0
45	FW	(Ivory Coast) CIV	Amara Traoré	20	0	11+8	0	1	0	0	0
70	MF	(Ivory Coast) CIV	Sosthène Tiehide	6	0	2+4	0	0	0	0	0
71	GK	(Russia) RUS	Sergei Revyakin	9	0	9	0	0	0	0	0
77	FW	(Bulgaria) BUL	Georgi Babaliev	8	0	4+4	0	0	0	0	0
81	MF	(Comoros) COM	Kassim Hadji	14	2	13+1	2	0	0	0	0
96	DF	(Armenia) ARM	Arman Hovhannisyan	6	0	6	0	0	0	0	0
98	GK	(Montenegro) MNE	Nemanja Lemajic	3	0	3	0	0	0	0	0
Players away on loan:
Players who left Ararat Yerevan during the season:
4	DF	(Armenia) ARM	Yuri Maghakyan	1	0	0+1	0	0	0	0	0
7	MF	(Nigeria) NGA	Isah Aliyu	20	0	14+3	0	0+1	0	0+2	0
11	MF	(Armenia) ARM	David Manoyan	22	0	9+10	0	0+1	0	1+1	0
17	MF	(Russia) RUS	Timur Pukhov	7	0	3+3	0	0+1	0	0	0
18	MF	(Armenia) ARM	Edgar Malakyan	18	0	12+4	0	0	0	2	0
22	DF	(Armenia) ARM	Arman Mkrtchyan	15	0	9+4	0	1	0	0+1	0
24	DF	(Ivory Coast) CIV	Dimitri Legbo	18	0	14+1	0	1	0	2	0
26	MF	(Armenia) ARM	Alik Arakelyan	19	1	8+8	1	0+1	0	2	0
27	MF	(Argentina) ARG	Iván Díaz	2	0	0	0	0	0	2	0
28	GK	(Russia) RUS	Artyom Potapov	21	0	18	0	1	0	2	0
29	DF	(Serbia) SRB	Marko Prljević	1	0	0	0	0	0	1	0
44	DF	(Colombia) COL	Juan Bravo	20	0	14+3	0	1	0	2	0
55	MF	(The Gambia) GAM	Babu Cham	10	0	0+8	0	0	0	2	0
99	DF	(Armenia) ARM	Robert Darbinyan	14	0	11+2	0	1	0	0	0

=== Goal scorers ===
Place	Position	Nation	Number	Name	Premier League	Armenian Cup	UEFA Europa Conference League	Total
1	FW	(Armenia)	9	Razmik Hakobyan	7	0	0	7
2	MF	(Armenia)	20	Rudik Mkrtchyan	3	0	0	3
2	FW	(Ivory Coast)	80	Amara Traoré	3	0	0	3
2	FW	(Nigeria)	30	Ibeh Ransom	3	0	0	3
2	FW	(Bosnia and Herzegovina)	10	Aleksandar Glišić	3	0	0	3
6	DF	(Serbia)	22	Dušan Mijić	2	0	0	2
6	MF	(Comoros)	81	Kassim Hadji	2	0	0	2
6	MF	(Armenia)	23	Gor Malakyan	0	0	2	2
9	DF	(Armenia)	2	Serob Galstyan	1	0	0	1
9	MF	(Ivory Coast)	25	Armand Dagrou	1	0	0	1
9	MF	(Armenia)	26	Alik Arakelyan	1	0	0	1
9	MF	(Armenia)	18	Edgar Malakyan	1	0	0	1
9	DF	(Tunisia)	2	Ayman Mahmoud	1	0	0	1
9	DF	(France)	4	Teddy Mézague	1	0	0	1
				TOTALS	29	0	2	31

=== Clean sheets ===
Place	Position	Nation	Number	Name	Premier League	Armenian Cup	UEFA Europa Conference League	Total
1	GK	(Russia)	28	Artyom Potapov	7	0	0	7
2	GK	(Russia)	71	Sergei Revyakin	4	0	0	4
3	GK	(Armenia)	1	Gor Manukyan	3	0	0	3
4	GK	(Montenegro)	98	Nemanja Lemajic	1	0	0	1
				TOTALS	14	0	0	14

=== Disciplinary record ===
Number	Nation	Position	Name	Premier League		Armenian Cup		UEFA Europa Conference League		Total	
Number	Nation	Position	Name	Booked	Sent off (straight red)	Booked	Sent off (straight red)	Booked	Sent off (straight red)	Booked	Sent off (straight red)
1	(Armenia)	GK	Gor Manukyan	1	0	0	0	0	0	1	0
2	(Tunisia)	DF	Ayman Mahmoud	1	0	0	0	0	0	1	0
4	(France)	DF	Teddy Mézague	1	0	0	0	0	0	1	0
5	(Armenia)	DF	Hrayr Mkoyan	7	3	1	0	0	0	8	3
6	(Armenia)	DF	Hayk Ishkhanyan	2	0	0	0	1	0	3	0
7	(Ivory Coast)	FW	Mohamed Kone	2	0	0	0	0	0	2	0
8	(Armenia)	DF	Vardan Arzoyan	4	1	0	0	0	0	4	1
9	(Armenia)	FW	Razmik Hakobyan	6	0	0	0	0	0	6	0
10	(Bosnia and Herzegovina)	FW	Aleksandar Glišić	2	1	0	0	0	0	2	1
14	(Armenia)	MF	Petros Afajanyan	2	0	0	0	0	0	2	0
19	(Senegal)	MF	Alassane Faye	4	0	0	0	0	0	4	0
20	(Armenia)	MF	Rudik Mkrtchyan	8	0	0	0	0	0	8	0
21	(Armenia)	DF	Serob Galstyan	4	0	0	0	0	0	4	0
22	(Serbia)	DF	Dušan Mijić	4	0	0	0	0	0	4	0
23	(Armenia)	MF	Gor Malakyan	8	1	0	0	2	0	10	1
24	(Cameroon)	FW	Hadji Issa Moustapha	1	0	0	0	0	0	1	0
25	(Ivory Coast)	MF	Armand Dagrou	2	0	0	0	0	0	2	0
30	(Nigeria)	FW	Ibeh Ransom	2	0	0	0	0	0	2	0
33	(Armenia)	DF	Hovhannes Nazaryan	1	0	0	0	0	0	1	0
71	(Russia)	GK	Sergei Revyakin	2	0	0	0	0	0	2	0
77	(Bulgaria)	FW	Georgi Babaliev	2	0	0	0	0	0	2	0
80	(Ivory Coast)	FW	Amara Traoré	2	0	0	0	0	0	2	0
81	(Comoros)	MF	Kassim Hadji	1	0	0	0	0	0	1	0
96	(Armenia)	DF	Arman Hovhannisyan	1	0	0	0	0	0	1	0
Players away on loan:
Players who left Ararat Yerevan during the season:
7	(Nigeria)	MF	Isah Aliyu	1	0	0	0	0	0	1	0
11	(Armenia)	MF	David Manoyan	1	0	0	0	1	0	2	0
17	(Russia)	MF	Timur Pukhov	1	0	0	0	0	0	1	0
18	(Armenia)	MF	Edgar Malakyan	1	0	0	0	0	0	1	0
22	(Armenia)	DF	Arman Mkrtchyan	3	0	0	0	0	0	3	0
27	(Argentina)	MF	Iván Díaz	0	0	0	0	1	0	1	0
28	(Russia)	GK	Artyom Potapov	4	0	0	0	0	0	4	0
29	(Serbia)	DF	Marko Prljević	0	0	0	0	1	0	1	0
44	(Colombia)	DF	Juan Bravo	5	0	0	0	0	0	5	0
99	(Armenia)	DF	Robert Darbinyan	2	0	0	0	0	0	2	0
			TOTALS	88	6	1	0	6	0	95	6
