= Zenin =

Zenin (Russian: Зенин) is a Russian masculine surname, its feminine counterpart is Zenina. Notable people with the surname include:

- Andrei Zenin (born 1991), Russian football player
- Vasily Zenin (born 1930), Russian wrestler
