= Atak =

Atak or ATAK may refer to:

== People ==
- Burhan Atak, Turkish footballer
- Hurşit Atak, Turkish weightlifter
- Serkan Atak, Turkish footballer
- Atak Lual, South Sudanese footballer
- Atak Ngor, South Sudanese director

== Military ==
- Android Team Awareness Kit, a navigation and situational awareness app (or its similarly named and developed military counterpart: Android Tactical Assault Kit)
- TAI/AgustaWestland T129 ATAK, a Turkish multi-role attack helicopter developed from the Agusta A129 Mangusta
- TAI T929 ATAK 2, a Turkish attack helicopter developed from the T129 ATAK and T625 Gökbey helicopters

== Other ==
- Atak (village), a village in the Barisal District of southern-central Bangladesh
- ATAK Sportswear, a Slovak sports equipment manufacturer
