= Karetnyk =

Karetnyk (Ukrainian: Каретник) is a Ukrainian surname. It may refer to:

- Semen Karetnyk (1893–1920), Ukrainian revolutionary and military commander
- Serhiy Karetnyk (born 1995), Ukrainian footballer
