= Alashkert =

Alashkert may refer to:

- Eleşkirt, a town in Ağrı Province in Turkey, originally an Armenian historic town known as Alashkert
- Alashkert, Armenia, a village in Armavir Province of Armenia, named after the original town of Alashkert
- FC Alashkert, an association football club based in Yerevan, Armenia
- Alashkert Stadium, a football stadium in Yerevan, Armenia, home of FC Alashkert
