= Weslen Júnior =

Brazilian footballer

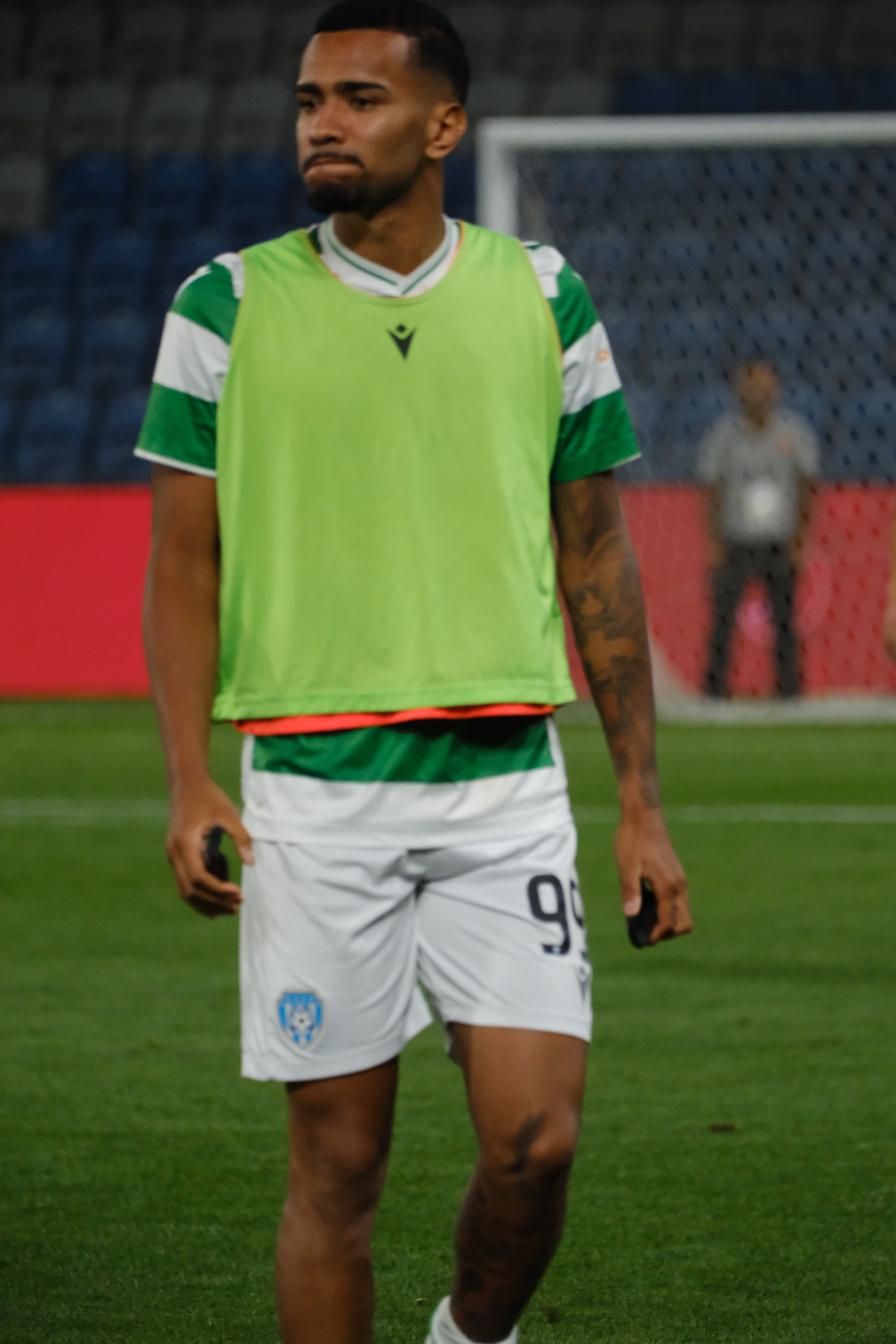

Personal information
- Full name: Weslen Júnior Faustino de Melo
- Date of birth: 12 November 1999 (age 26)
- Place of birth: Colorado, Paraná, Brazil
- Height: 1.83 m (6 ft 0 in)
- Position: Forward

Team information
- Current team: Rayong
- Number: 99

Youth career
- CA Diadema
- 2018: Bahia
- 2019: São Bernardo

Senior career*
Years	Team	Apps	(Gls)
2017	CA Diadema	6	(0)
2019–2020	São Bernardo	6	(0)
2019–2020	→ Ararat Yerevan (loan)	24	(4)
2020–2022	Puskás Akadémia II	20	(12)
2020–2022	Puskás Akadémia	12	(0)
2022–2023	SJK II	17	(8)
2023	SJK	4	(0)
2023	Manama	5	(1)
2024–2026	Cherno More	44	(4)
2026–	Rayong	0	(0)
- * Club domestic league appearances and goals as of 18:27, 8 December 2025 (UTC)

Weslen Júnior Faustino de Melo (born 12 November 1999) is a Brazilian professional footballer who plays as a forward for Thai League 1 club Rayong.

== Career ==
Weslen Júnior was loaned to Armenian Premier League side Ararat Yerevan in 2019.

He signed with Hungarian NB I side Puskás Akadémia in 2020.

On 16 August 2022, Weslen Júnior signed with SJK in Finnish Veikkausliiga. He was first assigned to their academy squad. One year later, after having made only four appearances with SJK first team in the league, Weslen Júnior departed the club and moved to Bahrain.

== Career statistics ==
As of 20 November 2024

Appearances and goals by club, season and competition
Club	Season	League			Cup		Continental		Other		Total	
Club	Season	Division	Apps	Goals	Apps	Goals	Apps	Goals	Apps	Goals	Apps	Goals
Ararat Yerevan	2019–20	Armenian Premier League	24	4	1	0	—		—		25	4
Puskás Akadémia II	2020–21	NB III	8	6	—		—		—		8	6
Puskás Akadémia II	2021–22	NB III	12	6	—		—		—		12	6
Puskás Akadémia II	Total		20	12	0	0	0	0	0	0	20	12
Puskás Akadémia	2020–21	NB I	9	0	3	0	1	0	—		13	0
Puskás Akadémia	2021–22	NB I	3	0	1	1	0	0	—		4	1
Puskás Akadémia	Total		12	0	4	1	1	0	0	0	17	1
SJK Akatemia	2022	Ykkönen	6	3	—		—		—		6	3
SJK Akatemia	2023	Ykkönen	11	5	0	0	—		4	1	15	5
SJK Akatemia	Total		17	8	0	0	4	1	0	0	21	9
SJK	2023	Veikkausliiga	4	0	—		—		—		4	0
Manama	2023–24	Bahraini Premier League	5	1	—		—		—		5	1
Cherno More	2023–24	Bulgarian First League	10	1	—		—		—		10	1
Cherno More	2024–25	Bulgarian First League	6	1	1	1	1	0	–		8	2
Cherno More	Total		16	2	1	1	1	0	0	0	18	3
Career total			98	28	6	2	2	0	4	1	110	31
