= Artak Apitonian =

Armenian diplomat

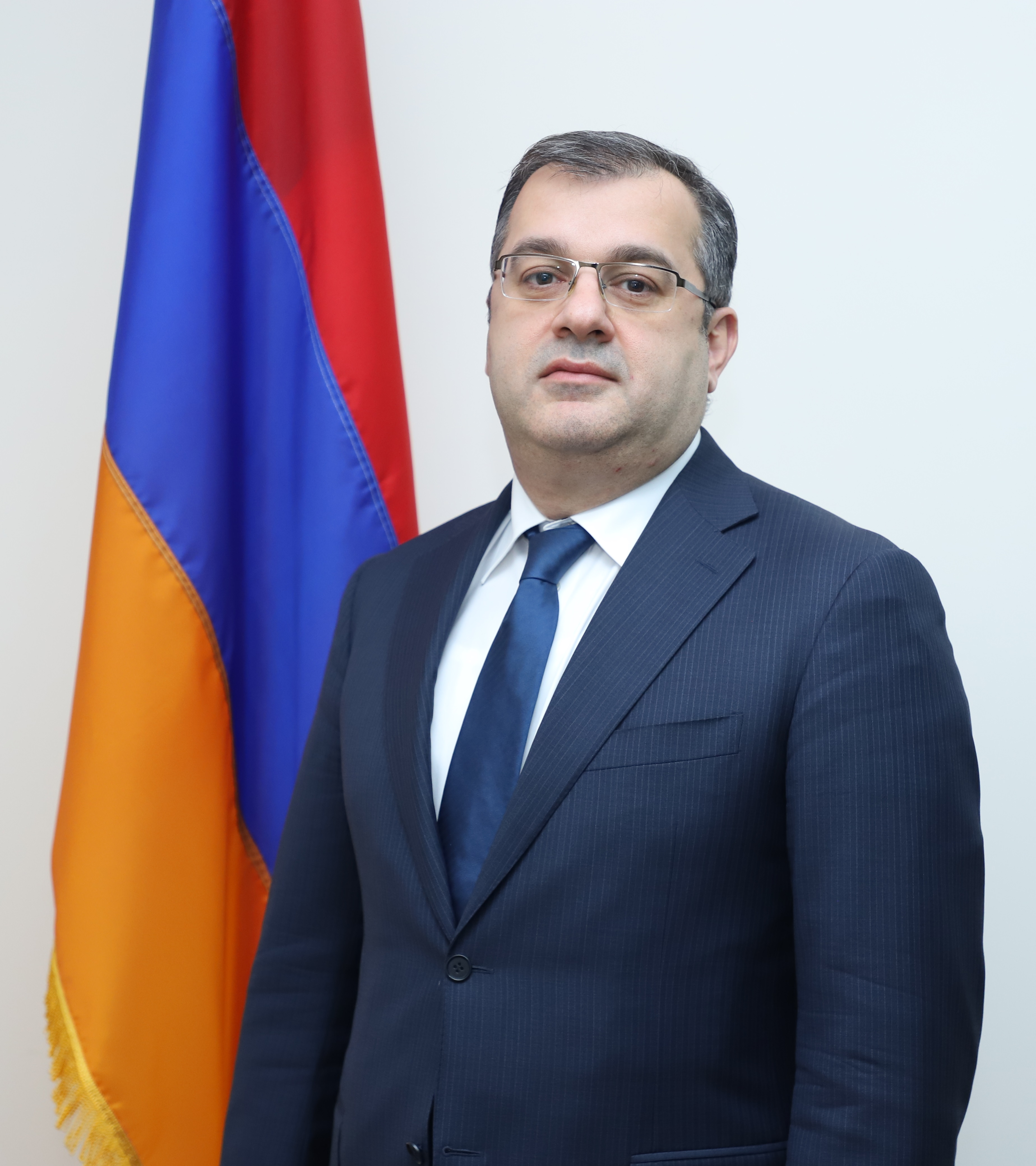

Personal details
- Born: August 26, 1971 (age 55) Alashkert
- Education: Yerevan State University
- Occupation: Diplomat

Artak Apitonian (Armenian: Արտակ Ապիտոնյան, born on August 26, 1971) is an Armenian diplomat. He was the deputy foreign minister of Armenia in 2018–2021, and Armenian ambassador to Sweden and Finland in 2013–2018. He was the CEO of The FUTURE ARMENIAN Development Foundation in 2022–2024.

== Early life and education ==
Artak Apitonian was born on August 26, 1971, in Sovetakan village (now Alashkert), Armavir Province of Armenia.

In 1992, he graduated with honors from the Yerevan State University Faculty of Oriental Studies (Arabic section). In 1991–1992 he also studied at Bourguiba Institute of Modern Languages in Tunisia, as an exchange student.

Before joining the Armenian diplomatic service, Apitonian attended long-term special diplomatic courses organized by the Institute of Diplomatic Studies in Egypt.

== Career ==
In 1993, Artak Apitonian joined the Ministry of Foreign Affairs of Armenia serving in the Middle East, Europe and at the international organizations, and holding top-managerial positions during his diplomatic career.

From 1995 to 1997, Apitonian served at the Embassy of Armenia in Cairo, Egypt, overseeing, inter alia, the Embassy transfer to the historic villa in Zamalek. In 1998, he was advisor to the Permanent Mission of Armenia to the United Nations in New York. From 1999 to 2002 he was the deputy chief of mission at the Embassy of Armenia in Beirut, Lebanon.

From 2002, Apitonian headed the United Nations division at the Armenian Foreign Ministry, before being appointed the Deputy Permanent Representative of Armenia to the United Nations Office at Geneva in 2005.

From 2009 to 2013, Apitonian was the Director for Foreign Relations at the Office of the President of Armenia.

From November 2013 he served as the first resident Ambassador of Armenia to Sweden, and from 2014 to Finland as well, effectively establishing a regional embassy in Stockholm.

In 2018, Apitonian has been appointed as the Deputy Minister of Foreign Affairs, overseeing the multilateral diplomacy, arms control, human rights as well as public and media relations.

He resigned from the post of Deputy Minister in June 2021, citing disagreement and irreconcilable differences with the policies of Nikol Pashinyan government.

From February 2022 to March 2024, Apitonian was the CEO of The FUTURE ARMENIAN Development Foundation. In this position, he organized first pan-Armenian citizen's assembly – the Convention of the Future Armenian in March 10–12, 2023.

Since 2022, Apitonian is a visiting lecturer at Yerevan State University (Post-Graduate Department) in global studies and sustainable development.

== Diplomatic rank ==
Apitonian has a diplomatic rank of Ambassador Extraordinary and Plenipotentiary (2016).
