= Atak Ngor =

South Sudanese film director, writer and producer

- Born: 1997 (age 28–29); South Sudan
- Occupations: Film director, screenwriter, producer

Atak Ngor is a South Sudanese film director, writer, and producer. Ngor is best known for writing and directing Atak's Film (2016) for Special Broadcasting Service (SBS) and The Foundation for Young Australians (FYA).

Ngor was born in what is now South Sudan during the Second Sudanese Civil War in 1997. After fleeing his homeland aged 6-year-old, he resettled in Kakuma Refugee Camp in Kakuma, Kenya. In Kakuma, he then, spent a few years in the camp, before finally being granted to Australia.

== Career ==
In 2016, Ngor won the SBS National Youth Week Competition to write and direct a short film called Atak's Film which premiered on SBS in April, 2016. The film was produced by SBS and FYA.

== Filmography ==
=== Short films ===
- Atak's Film (2016) (writer, director)

=== Awards ===
- Winner, National Youth Week (2016)
