= Sergei Revyakin =

Russian footballer

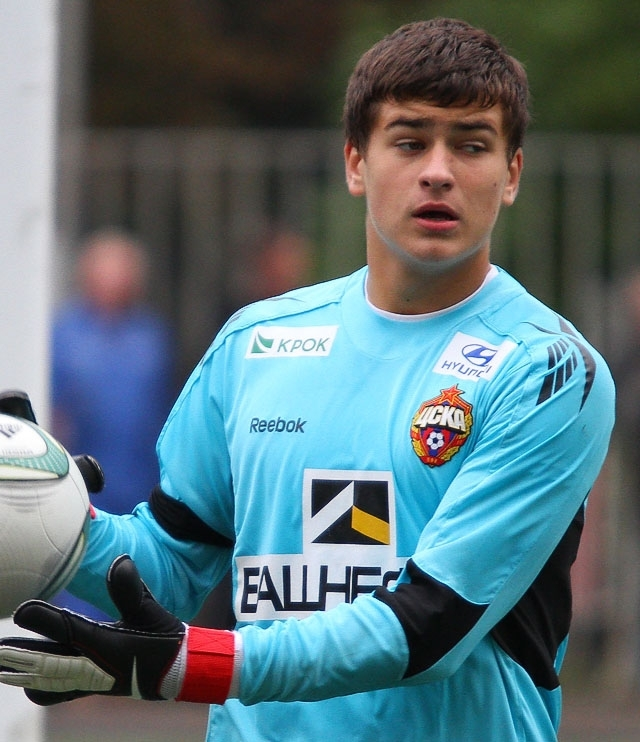
- Revyakin with CSKA Moscow in 2011

Personal information
- Full name: Sergei Pavlovich Revyakin
- Date of birth: 2 April 1995 (age 31)
- Place of birth: Kronstadt, Russia
- Height: 1.89 m (6 ft 2 1/2 in)
- Position: Goalkeeper

Youth career
- 2011–2014: PFC CSKA Moscow

Senior career*
Years	Team	Apps	(Gls)
2011–2015	CSKA Moscow	2	(0)
2015–2016	Torpedo Armavir	5	(0)
2016	Domodedovo Moscow	10	(0)
2017	Ararat Moscow	1	(0)
2019	Ararat Moscow (amateur)		
2019–2020	Ararat Yerevan	24	(0)
2021	Aktobe	7	(0)
2022–2023	Alashkert	0	(0)
2023	Ararat Yerevan	9	(0)
2023	Zhetysu	4	(0)

International career
2010–2011	Russia U-16	5	(0)
2011	Russia U-17	3	(0)
2013	Russia U-18	1	(0)
- * Club domestic league appearances and goals

Sergei Pavlovich Revyakin (Russian: Серге́й Павлович Ревякин; born 2 April 1995) is a Russian former professional footballer who played as a goalkeeper.

== Career ==
=== Club ===
On 26 June 2019, Ararat Yerevan announced the signing of Revyakin.

On 14 April 2021, Aktobe announced the signing of Revyakin.

On 26 September 2022, Alashkert announced the signing of free-agent Revyakin. After one appearance, Revyakin left Alashkert on 28 January 2023, resigning for Ararat Yerevan on 17 February 2023. On 20 June 2023, Ararat Yerevan confirmed the departure of Revyakin.

On 14 July 2023, Revyakin signed for Zhetysu.

== Career statistics ==
=== Club ===
As of match played 20 May 2023

Appearances and goals by club, season and competition
Club	Season	League			National Cup		League Cup		Continental		Other		Total	
Club	Season	Division	Apps	Goals	Apps	Goals	Apps	Goals	Apps	Goals	Apps	Goals	Apps	Goals
CSKA Moscow	2011–12	Premier League	2	0	0	0	–		0	0	–		0	0
CSKA Moscow	2012–13	Premier League	0	0	0	0	–		0	0	–		2	0
CSKA Moscow	2013–14	Premier League	0	0	0	0	–		0	0	–		2	0
CSKA Moscow	2014–15	Premier League	0	0	0	0	–		0	0	–		2	0
CSKA Moscow	Total		2	0	0	0	-	-	0	0	-	-	2	0
Torpedo Armavir	2015–16	Football National League	5	0	1	0	–		–		–		6	0
Domodedovo Moscow	2015–16	Professional Football League	10	0	0	0	–		–		–		10	0
Ararat Moscow	2017–18	Professional Football League	1	0	3	0	–		–		–		4	0
Ararat Yerevan	2019–20	Armenian Premier League	24	0	1	0	–		–		–		25	0
Aktobe	2021	Kazakhstan Premier League	7	0	0	0	–		–		–		7	0
Alashkert	2022–23	Armenian Premier League	0	0	1	0	–		–		–		1	0
Ararat Yerevan	2022–23	Armenian Premier League	9	0	0	0	–		0	0	–		9	0
Career total			58	0	6	0	-	-	0	0	-	-	64	0

== Honours ==
=== Club ===
CSKA Moscow

- Russian Premier League (1): 2013–14
