= The Foundation for Young Australians =

Australian non-profit organisation

- Formation: 1977
- Type: NGO
- Purpose: Backing young people with the trust, resources, skills and connections to make change.
- Headquarters: Melbourne
- Region served: Australia
- Chief Executive Officer (Acting): Molly Whelan
- Main organ: Board of Directors
- Staff: 40
- Website: fya.org.au

The Foundation for Young Australians (FYA) is an Australian non-profit organisation whose purpose is to back young people with the trust, resources, skills, and connections to make change. The organisation's vision is that young people have the power to beat injustice and transform the future. It became a registered charity in 1999.

== History ==
=== Partnerships ===
The FYA has a history of partnering with individuals, organisations and schools. It was formed in 2000 through a partnership between The Queen's Trust for Young Australians (1977–2000) and the Australian Youth Foundation (1987–2000).

In July 2008 an alliance was formed between the Education Foundation and the FYA. The Education Foundation was founded in 1989 by Ellen Koshland with the aim of developing and delivering education programs, community engagement and research to Australian students. The partnership was to establish the FYA as the primary advocate for young Australians.

=== Research, submissions and publications ===
FYA has previously published research on the future of work, and the challenges young people facing in transitioning between education and employment. In 2012, the FYA calculated that 30% of students who left high school in Year 9 or below were NEET.

In 2013, the FYA made a submission to the Australian House of Representatives Inquiry on the Australian Education Bill 2012 with 5 recommendations:

To ensure young Australians are prepared and equipped for their futures there is an urgent need for a comprehensive and intergenerational investment in Australia's young people that would encompass:

1. A nation building non-partisan focused education strategy to redesign and reform the learning system and curriculum from preschool through higher education (and beyond) to ensure their competitiveness in the 21st Century.
2. A new commitment to the teaching and learning of enterprise skills, capabilities and attributes. This must include investing in outcomes measurement, assessment and evaluation to ensure accountability measures at all levels within the system drive and support evidence-based practice.
3. Enterprise education and enhancing student capabilities will necessitate having a good understanding of personalised and product-oriented learning processes. Education systems and school leaders must support and enable new student-teacher relationships where learning is no longer teacher-dependent but teacher-enabled.
4. The culture, structures and processes of schools, and resourcing opportunities and constraints available must ensure relevant entrepreneurial learning opportunities are available to all students.
5. Students will increasingly become consumers of learning and will increasingly demand agency over their learning in order to understand, articulate and own their own learning experiences. School curricula and learning environments must be reconfigured to match this demand, ensuring their offerings are relevant and high-quality.

The bill passed as The Australian Education Act 2013, received the Royal Assent 27 June 2013 and passed into law 1 January 2014.

A 2014 report by the FYA found that people under the age of 24 were likely to be worse off than their parents, with a 30% unemployment rate and more university debt and spending most income on housing. The FYA also made a submission to the Australian Department of Education 'Review to Achieve Excellence in Australian Schools' led by David Gonski that was released in 2018.

In 2020, under new CEO, Nick Moraitis, FYA released an updated three-year strategy, positioning the organisation as a strategic intermediary backing young people with trust, resources, skills and connections to make change.
