= Artak Aleksanyan =

Armenian footballer

Personal information
- Full name: Artak L. Aleksanyan
- Date of birth: 10 March 1991 (age 35)
- Place of birth: Yerevan, Soviet Armenia
- Height: 1.74 m (5 ft 9 in)
- Positions: Defender; midfielder

Youth career
- 2000–2009: Spartak Moscow

Senior career*
Years	Team	Apps	(Gls)
2009–2010	Pyunik Yerevan	24	(1)
2010	Ural Sverdlovsk Oblast	6	(0)
2011	Pyunik Yerevan	18	(1)
2011–2013	FC Khimki	39	(3)
2013	Baltika Kaliningrad	5	(0)
2014–2015	Ulisses FC	27	(9)
2015	FC Torpedo Armavir	22	(2)
2016	FC Gandzasar Kapan	8	(0)
2017	FC Ararat Moscow	7	(0)
2019	FC Ararat Moscow (amateur)		
2019–2020	FC Ararat Yerevan	13	(2)

International career^{‡}
2008	Armenia U-19	6	(1)
2009	Armenia U-21	7	(0)
2010–	Armenia	2	(0)
- * Club domestic league appearances and goals as of 30 August 2017 ‡ National team caps and goals as of 9 February 2011

Artak Aleksanyan (Armenian: Արտակ Ալեքսանյան; born on 10 March 1991) is an Armenian football player who is a free agent. He last played for FC Ararat Yerevan and the Armenia national football team. He also holds Russian citizenship.

== Club career ==
Artak's family moved to Moscow when he was two years old. He started playing football at 9 years old in the football sportschool of Spartak Moscow, which he was a pupil of ?.

In January 2009, he signed a contract with and transferred to the reigning Armenian Premier League champions Pyunik Yerevan. On the field, Aleksanyan played periodically. As part of Pyunik, he debuted in the 2009–10 UEFA Champions League on 14 July 2009 in a home match against Dinamo Zagreb. Aleksanyan came off the bench in the 68th minute.

In December, his contract with Pyunik ended. After negotiations with several clubs, in January he signed a contract with the Ural Sverdlovsk Oblast, playing in the Russian National Football League. The contract was set for one year.

Due to not playing in the first team of the Ural, Aleksanyan has decided to change clubs. In January 2011, arrived at the camp in Mordovia Saransk and started their training. However, after some time Aleksanyan arrived in Yerevan and with Pyunik on a training camp in Cyprus. After a contract was signed for a year, which was close to the end of August, both parties later terminated it with mutual desire.

On 31 August, FC Khimki presented Aleksanyan on their squad. A contract was signed and lasted until the end of 2012. In late June, Aleksanyan, along with Arthur Yedigaryan and Edward Tatoyan, left the club. However, in late July, he returned to the club by signing a new contract.

== International career ==
On 9 February 2011, Aleksanyan debuted for the Armenia national football team in a friendly match against Georgia. He was substituted in at the 85th minute in place of Edgar Manucharyan.

== Personal life ==
Artak has a father, Levon, a mother, Nune, and a younger brother Arthur.

His agent is Valeri Aleksanyan Oganesyan.

== Honours ==
=== Club ===
Pyunik Yerevan

- Armenian Premier League (1): 2009
- Armenian Premier League Runner-up (1): 2011
- Armenian Cup (1): 2009
- Armenian Supercup Runner-up (1): 2009
