= Ivan Spychka =

Ukrainian footballer

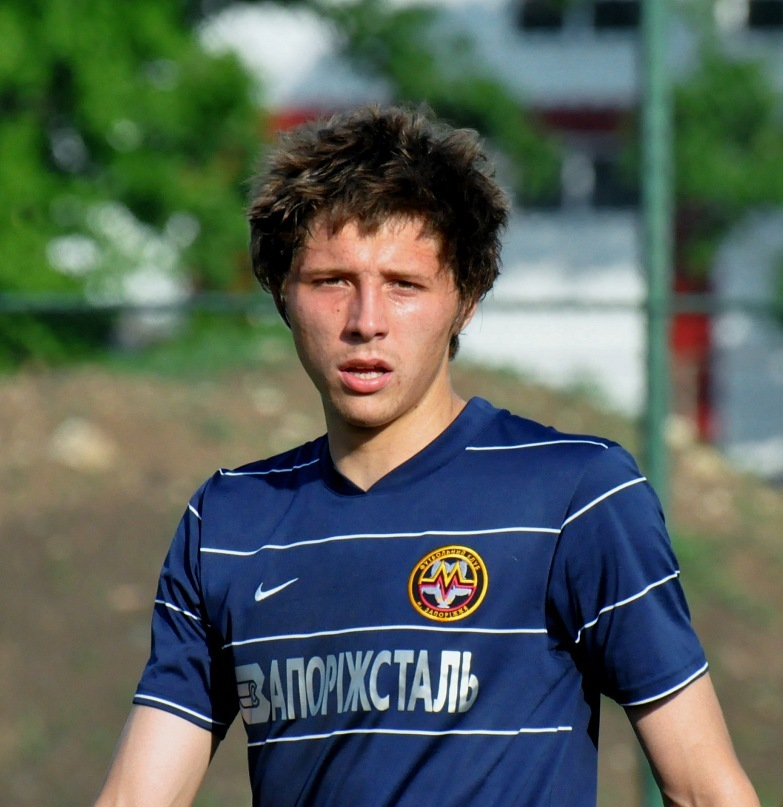

Personal information
- Full name: Ivan Mykolayovych Spychka
- Date of birth: 18 January 1991 (age 35)
- Place of birth: Dnipropetrovsk, Ukrainian SSR
- Height: 1.83 m (6 ft 0 in)
- Position: Defender

Youth career
- 2004–2005: FC Inter Dnipropetrovsk
- 2005–2006: FC ISTA Dnipropetrovsk
- 2006–2007: FC Inter Dnipropetrovsk
- 2007–2008: Metalurh Zaporizhzhia

Senior career*
Years	Team	Apps	(Gls)
2008–2013	Metalurh Zaporizhzhia	1	(0)
2008–2011	→ Metalurh-2 Zaporizhzhia	33	(1)
2012	→ Helios Kharkiv (loan)	1	(0)
2013	Arsenal Bila Tserkva	12	(3)
2013–2015	Dynamo-2 Kyiv	13	(0)
2016	Veres Rivne	8	(0)
2018	Kafa Feodosia	8	(1)
2019	Ararat Moscow (amateur)		
2019–2021	Ararat Yerevan	34	(1)
2021–2022	Shukura Kobuleti	9	(0)
2022	ŁKS Łagów	9	(0)
2022	Concordia Elbląg	13	(0)
2023	Liptovský Mikuláš	12	(1)
2023–2024	Viagem Ústí nad Labem	30	(2)
- * Club domestic league appearances and goals as of 6 January 2025

Ivan Spychka (Ukrainian: Іван Миколайович Спичка; born 18 January 1991) is a Ukrainian professional footballer who plays as a defender.

== Club career ==
Spychka is a product of the different Dnipropetrovsk youth sportive school systems. Then he transferred to FC Metalurh Zaporizhzhia youth sportive school and became a member of the main team. He made his debut in the Ukrainian Premier League in the match against FC Volyn Lutsk on 28 November 2010. In August 2013 he signed a contract with FC Dynamo-2 and left this club in June 2015.
