= Denis Shevchuk =

Russian footballer

Personal information
- Full name: Denis Vitalyevich Shevchuk
- Date of birth: 23 January 1992 (age 34)
- Place of birth: Talne, Ukraine
- Height: 1.69 m (5 ft 6 1/2 in)
- Position: Forward

Youth career
- –2005: Shakhtar Donetsk
- 2006–2007: Serhiy Bubka College
- 2008–2009: Olimpik Donetsk

Senior career*
Years	Team	Apps	(Gls)
2010	FC Olimpik-UOR Donetsk		
2010	Feniks-Illichovets	11	(1)
2011	Desna Chernihiv	7	(1)
2011	Dynamo Khmelnytskyi	11	(4)
2012–2013	Makiyivvuhillya Makiivka	28	(10)
2013	Shakhtar-3 Donetsk	3	(0)
2013–2014	Makiyivvuhillya Makiivka	17	(5)
2015	SKChF Sevastopol	5	(4)
2015	FC Rubin Yalta	12	(9)
2016–2017	Sevastopol	2	(0)
2017–2018	Baltika Kaliningrad	13	(3)
2018–2019	Ararat Moscow		
2019	Ararat Yerevan	1	(0)
2020	Ocean Kerch	10	(0)
2020–2021	TSK Simferopol	20	(0)
- * Club domestic league appearances and goals

Denis Vitalyevich Shevchuk (Russian: Денис Витальевич Шевчук; born 23 January 1992) is a Russian former football player. Until 2014 he held Ukrainian citizenship as Denys Vitaliyovych Shevchuk (Ukrainian: Денис Віталійович Шевчук).

== Club career ==
He made his debut in the Russian Football National League for FC Baltika Kaliningrad on 24 September 2017 in a game against FC Tom Tomsk and scored the winning goal in his team 2–1 victory.

On 26 June 2019, Shevchuk signed for Ararat Yerevan. On 5 December 2019, Shevchuk left Ararat Moscow after making one appearance for the club.
