= Artak Dashyan =

Armenian footballer

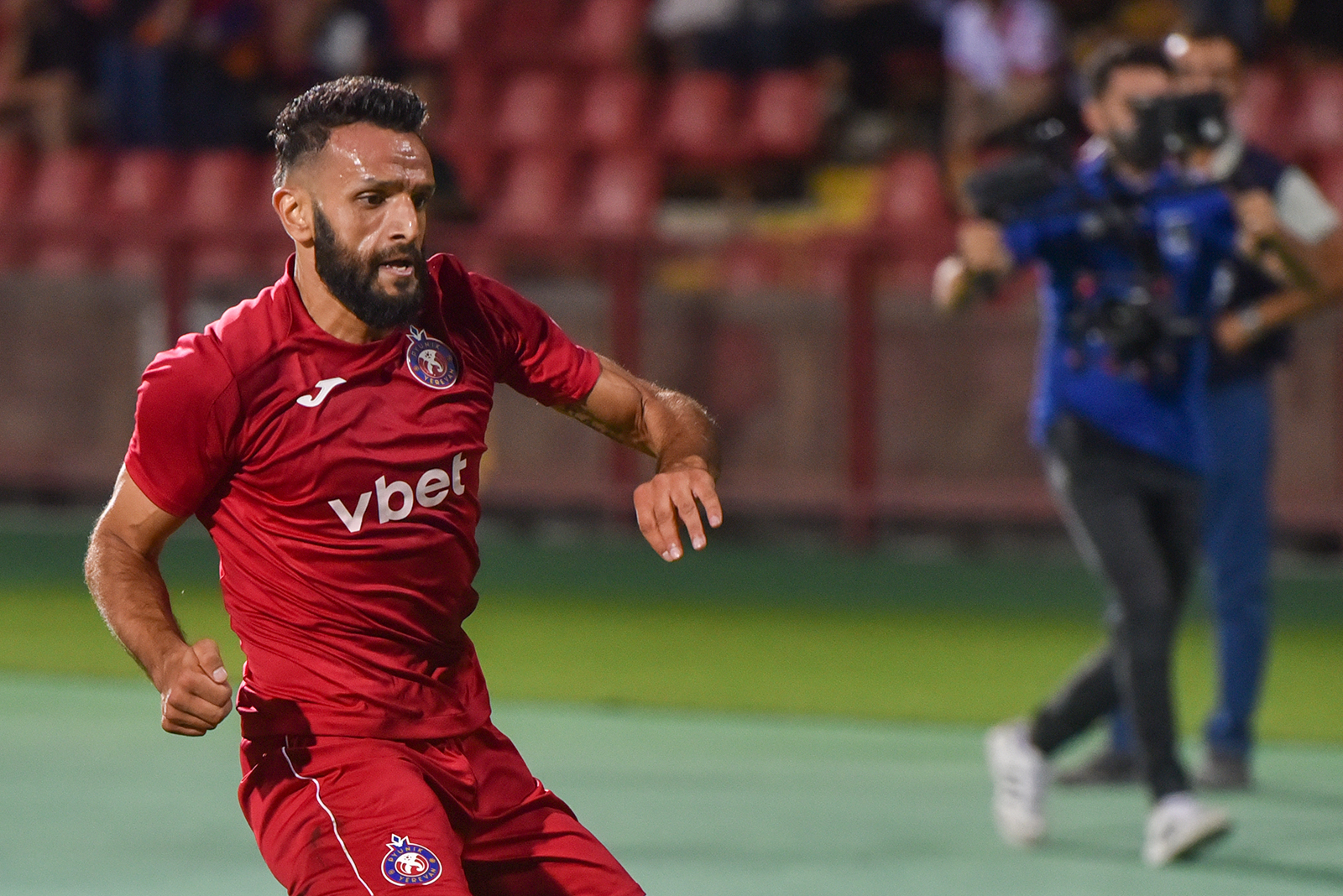
- Dashyan with Pyunik in 2022

Personal information
- Full name: Artak Artyushevich Dashyan
- Date of birth: 20 November 1989 (age 36)
- Place of birth: Yerevan, Armenian SSR, Soviet Union
- Height: 1.81 m (5 ft 11 in)
- Position: Midfielder

Team information
- Current team: Pyunik
- Number: 11

Youth career
- Shengavit

Senior career*
Years	Team	Apps	(Gls)
2007–2009	Banants Yerevan	34	(8)
2010–2011	Metalurh Donetsk	13	(0)
2011–2013	Banants	52	(11)
2013–2014	Gandzasar Kapan	24	(9)
2014	→ Al-Muharraq (loan)		
2014–2016	Vardar	43	(7)
2016–2019	Alashkert	68	(10)
2019–2020	Urartu	3	(0)
2020–2021	Atyrau	33	(3)
2022–2024	Pyunik	74	(11)
2024–2026	Noah	20	(1)
2026–	Pyunik	8	(0)

International career^{‡}
2008–2010	Armenia U-21	6	(2)
2009–	Armenia	27	(2)
- * Club domestic league appearances and goals as of 18 June 2026 ‡ National team caps and goals as of 20 March 2025 (UTC)

Artak Dashyan (Armenian: Արտակ Դաշյան, born on 20 November 1989 in Yerevan, Armenia) is an Armenian professional footballer who last played as a midfielder for Pyunik and the Armenia national team.

== Club career ==
Artak Dashyan is a graduate of the football school Shengavit. In 2006, he received an invitation from Banants Yerevan, for which he began performing for in the Armenian Premier League in 2007. Dashyan's potential began to show at an early age. His game drew the attention of the head coach of the club, and then the football team.

In the 2009 Armenian Premier League, during a 24-round game between Banants and Shirak Gyumri, he insulted the referee and was immediately sent off. The Football Federation of Armenia Disciplinary Committee decided to disqualify the player for the next four matches of the Armenian Premier League and his club was fined $150 000 AMD.

After meeting in Metalurh Donetsk, coached by former Banants head coach Nikolay Kostov, Dashyan had signed a contract for 3 years with the possibility of renewal in another 2.

Dashyan rarely got into matches and left the touch-lines only as a replacement player. Metalurh decided to put the player on loan. The main stakeholder in getting the player was former club Banants. As a result, the leaders of the two clubs reached an agreement on the transition of Dashyan on lease conditions to Banants. Dashyan effortlessly merged with the plans of the coaching team. After the retirement of team captain Arthur Voskanyan in mid-season, the new team captain became Arsen Balabekyan and Dashyan became vice-captain. After the conclusion of the season, the club decided not to renew the contract with Balabekyan, who left the club. Dashyan thus became the team captain. In 2013, he was transferred to Gandzasar Kapan.

In January 2014, Dashyan joined Al-Muharraq on loan for the remainder of the 2013–14 season.

In 2016, he was transferred to FC Alashkert.

On 6 March 2020, FC Atyrau announced the signing of Dashyan.

On 16 December 2021, FC Pyunik announced the signing of Dashyan.

== International career ==
Dashyan joined the Armenia U-21 youth team in 2008. A year later, he became a member of the Armenia national football team. His first match with the national team was held on 11 February 2009 in Cyprus in a friendly match against Latvia. The match ended 0–0. Dashyan subsequently played in a FIFA World Cup qualification match against Spain on 10 October 2009 and a friendly match against Iran on 11 August 2010 (1–3 Loss).

== Personal life ==
He got married in late November 2011.

== Career statistics ==
=== Club ===
As of 21 March 2011

Appearances and goals by club, season and competition
Club	Season	League			National cup (Note: Includes Template Cup, Sample Cup)		Continental		Other		Total	
Club	Season	Division	Apps	Goals	Apps	Goals	Apps	Goals	Apps	Goals	Apps	Goals
Banants Yerevan	2007	Armenian Premier League	2	0	0	0	0	0	0	0	2	0
Banants Yerevan	2008	Armenian Premier League	13	4	0	0	0	0	0	0	13	4
Banants Yerevan	2009	Armenian Premier League	19	4	5	0	2	1	0	0	26	5
Banants Yerevan	Total		34	8	5	0	2	1	0	0	41	9
Metalurh Donetsk	2009–10	Ukrainian Premier League	4	0	0	0	0	0	3	0	7	0
Metalurh Donetsk	2010–11	Ukrainian Premier League	9	0	1	0	0	0	14	0	24	0
Metalurh Donetsk	Total		13	0	1	0	0	0	17	0	31	0
Banants Yerevan	2011	Armenian Premier League	25	4	0	0	0	0	0	0	1	0
Career total			48	8	6	0	2	1	17	0	73	9

=== International ===
As of match played 20 March 2025

Appearances and goals by national team and year
National team	Year	Apps	Goals
Armenia	2009	2	0
Armenia	2010	1	0
Armenia	2014	4	0
Armenia	2022	8	1
Armenia	2023	8	1
Armenia	2024	3	0
Armenia	2025	1	0
Total		27	2

Scores and results list Armenia's goal tally first, score column indicates score after each Dashyan goal.

List of international goals scored by Artak Dashyan
No.	Date	Venue	Opponent	Score	Result	Competition
1.	27 September 2022	Aviva Stadium, Dublin, Republic of Ireland	Republic of Ireland	1–2	2–3	2022–23 UEFA Nations League
2.	8 September 2023	New Eskişehir Stadium, Eskişehir, Turkey	Turkey	1–0	1–1	UEFA Euro 2024 qualifying

== Honours ==
Pyunik Yerevan

- Armenian Premier League: 2021–22, 2023–24

Banants Yerevan

- Armenian Premier League runner-up: 2007
- Armenian Cup: 2007; runner-up 2008, 2009
- Armenian Supercup runner-up: 2011–12

Metalurh Donetsk

- Ukrainian Cup runner-up: 2009–10
