= Sancidino Silva =

Portuguese footballer

Personal information
- Full name: Sancidino Malam da Silva
- Date of birth: 5 March 1994 (age 32)
- Place of birth: Bissau, Guinea-Bissau
- Height: 1.76 m (5 ft 9 in)
- Positions: Forward; winger

Team information
- Current team: Ermis Aradippou
- Number: 70

Youth career
- 2007–2013: Benfica

Senior career*
Years	Team	Apps	(Gls)
2012–2014	Benfica B	9	(2)
2015–2016	Benfica B	37	(6)
2016–2017	Arouca	6	(0)
2017–2018	Leixões	8	(0)
2018–2020	Lausanne	12	(2)
2020	Ararat Yerevan	2	(0)
2021	Al-Taraji	0	(0)
2023-	Ermis Aradippou	1	(0)

International career
2009	Portugal U16	2	(1)
2009–2011	Portugal U17	29	(8)
2011–2012	Portugal U18	9	(5)
2012–2013	Portugal U19	8	(0)
- * Club domestic league appearances and goals as of 24 October 2023

Sancidino Malam da Silva (born 5 March 1994) is a Portuguese professional footballer who currently plays either as a forward or a winger.

== Club career ==
Sancidino was born in Bissau, Guinea-Bissau. On 4 November 2012, he played his first professional match for Benfica B against Sporting B in Segunda Liga, coming as a substitute in the 88th minute. On 30 June 2014, his contract with Benfica ended and he left the club, but on 24 February 2015, he announced that he had returned to Benfica and had signed a five-year contract.

On 29 February 2020, FC Ararat Yerevan announced the signing of Silva.

On 5 August 2021, Silva joined Saudi Arabian club Al-Taraji.

== International career ==
Sancidino represented the Portuguese under-17 team in the qualification for the 2010 UEFA European Championship, held in Liechtenstein. Later he was called for the final squad, playing in three games in an eventual group stage exit.

== Club statistics ==
As of 8 August 2015

Club	Season	Domestic League		Domestic Cup		League Cup		Continental		Total	
Club	Season	Apps	Goals	Apps	Goals	Apps	Goals	Apps	Goals	Apps	Goals
Benfica B	2012–13	1	0	—		—		—		1	0
Benfica B	2013–14	8	2	—		—		—		8	2
Benfica B	2015–16	37	6	—		—		—		37	6
Career total		46	8	—		—		—		15	8
