= Georgi Babaliev =

Bulgarian footballer

Personal information
- Full name: Georgi Nikolaev Babaliev
- Date of birth: 14 May 2001 (age 25)
- Place of birth: Karnobat, Bulgaria
- Height: 1.66 m (5 ft 5 in)
- Position: Forward

Team information
- Current team: Alay Osh
- Number: 7

Youth career
- 2011–2013: Karnobat
- 2013–2015: Chernomorets Burgas
- 2015–2019: Ludogorets Razgrad

Senior career*
Years	Team	Apps	(Gls)
2019–2020	Ludogorets Razgrad II	2	(0)
2020	Vitosha Bistritsa	6	(1)
2020	Sozopol	0	(0)
2021	Lokomotiv Sofia	9	(0)
2021–2023	Spartak Varna	41	(6)
2022–2023	Spartak Varna II	1	(1)
2023–2024	Ararat Yerevan	19	(0)
2024	Spartak Varna	8	(1)
2024	Etar	11	(0)
2025–2026	Yantra Gabrovo	46	(4)
2026–	Alay Osh	13	(2)

International career
2017	Bulgaria U17	2	(0)
- * Club domestic league appearances and goals as of 31 October 2026

Georgi Nikolaev Babaliev (Bulgarian: Георги Николаев Бабалиев; born 14 March 2001) is a Bulgarian professional footballer who plays as a forward for Kyrgyz Higher League club Alay Osh.

== Career ==
Babaliev started his youth career in the local Karnobat, before moving to Chernomorets Burgas and later to Ludogorets Razgrad. On 22 December 2020 he joined Lokomotiv Sofia, coming from an unsuccessful spell in Sozopol. In July 2021 he moved to Spartak Varna. The team won a promotion to the First League. On 22 July 2022 he scored Spartak's first goal for the season in the First League, in the 1:1 draw with Pirin Blagoevgrad.
