= Atak (village) =

- Location in Bangladesh
- Coordinates: 22°53′33″N 90°14′16″E
- Country: Bangladesh
- Division: Barisal Division
- District: Barisal District
- Time zone: UTC+6 (Bangladesh Time)

Atak is a village in Barisal District in the Barisal Division of southern-central Bangladesh.
