= Drissa Diarra (footballer, born 1999) =

Malian footballer

Personal information
- Full name: Drissa Diarra
- Date of birth: 1 May 1999 (age 27)
- Place of birth: Bamako, Mali
- Height: 1.80 m (5 ft 11 in)
- Position: Centre back

Team information
- Current team: AS Bamako

Senior career*
Years	Team	Apps	(Gls)
2017–2019	AS Bamako		
2019–2020	Ararat II		
2020–	AS Bamako		

International career^{‡}
2019	Mali U20	4	(0)
2017	Mali	0	(0)
- * Club domestic league appearances and goals as of 00:11, 26 March 2021 (UTC) ‡ National team caps and goals as of 00:11, 26 March 2021 (UTC)

Drissa Diarra (born 1 May 1999) is a Malian footballer who plays as a centre back for AS Bamako and the Mali national team.

== International career ==
Diarra made his professional debut with the Mali national team in a 1–1 friendly tie with Senegal on 6 August 2017.
