= Irakli Logua =

Russian footballer

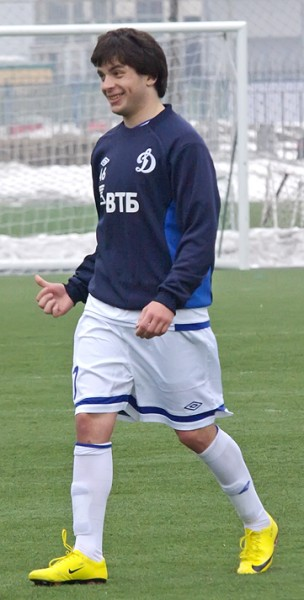

Personal information
- Full name: Irakli Genovich Logua
- Date of birth: 29 July 1991 (age 35)
- Place of birth: Ochamchire, Georgia
- Height: 1.73 m (5 ft 8 in)
- Position: Winger

Team information
- Current team: Amkal Moscow
- Number: 9

Youth career
- 2007–2010: Dynamo Moscow

Senior career*
| Years | Team | Apps | (Gls) |
| 2010–2012 | Dynamo Moscow | 1 | (0) |
| 2011 | → Fakel Voronezh (loan) | 24 | (1) |
| 2012 | → Sibir Novosibirsk (loan) | 6 | (0) |
| 2013–2015 | Flora Tallinn | 84 | (21) |
| 2016 | Torpedo Armavir | 5 | (1) |
| 2016–2017 | Dolgoprudny | 21 | (8) |
| 2017–2018 | Zorky Krasnogorsk | 34 | (2) |
| 2019 | Ararat Moscow | 6 | (6) |
| 2019–2020 | Ararat Yerevan | 7 | (1) |
| 2020–2021 | Forte Taganrog | 29 | (4) |
| 2021 | Kolomna | 14 | (12) |
| 2022–2023 | Veles Moscow | 42 | (10) |
| 2023–2024 | Yenisey Krasnoyarsk | 10 | (0) |
| 2024– | Amkal Moscow (amateur) | | |

International career
| 2007–2008 | Russia U-17 | 4 | (3) |
| 2009–2010 | Russia U-19 | 5 | (4) |
| 2011 | Russia U-20 | 6 | (3) |
- * Club domestic league appearances and goals as of 26 November 2023

Irakli Genovich Logua (Russian: Ираклий Генович Логуа; born 29 July 1991) is a Russian professional football player who plays for Amkal Moscow.

== Club career ==
He made his Russian Premier League debut on 24 July 2010 for FC Dynamo Moscow in a game against FC Rubin Kazan.

On 28 February 2013, Logua signed a one-year contract with Estonian Meistriliiga side Flora Tallinn. In 2013 season Logua scored 8 goals and gave 14 assists for Flora in 30 games. In the end of the season, he was voted "The Favourite Player of the Year" by Flora fans. In 2014, he scored 10 goals in 35 matches and in 2015 3 goals in 19 matches. He left the club in August 2015 on a mutual agreement.

On 15 September 2019, Logua joined FC Ararat Yerevan.
