= Alashkert, Armenia =

Alashkert Ալաշկերտ
- Location within Armenia
- Coordinates: 40°06′48″N 44°03′19″E
- Country: Armenia
- Province: Armavir

Population (2011)
  - Total: 1,569
- Time zone: UTC+4 (AMT)

Alashkert (Armenian: Ալաշկերտ) is a village in the Armavir Province of Armenia.

== Toponymy ==
Prior to 1935 the village was known as Kyarimarkh. The village was then known as Sovetakan between 1935 and 2008. In 2008, the village was renamed Alashkert, after the historic Western Armenian town of Alashkert, from which many of its inhabitants had escaped in 1918.

== History ==
The village was populated by Iranian Azerbaijanis who were forcibly settled in Alashkert as part of raising Muslim dominance in the region. Armenian migrants settled in the region in 1918 after having escaped from Western Armenia.
