= Andrei Zenin =

Russian footballer

Personal information
- Full name: Andrei Valentinovich Zenin
- Date of birth: 4 March 1991 (age 35)
- Place of birth: Tyumen, Russian SFSR
- Height: 1.82 m (6 ft 0 in)
- Positions: Midfielder; forward

Senior career*
Years	Team	Apps	(Gls)
2011	FC Volgar-Gazprom Astrakhan	0	(0)
2012–2013	FC Volgar-Astrakhan Astrakhan	25	(2)
2014–2015	FC Volgar Astrakhan	6	(3)
2015–2016	FC Astrakhan	23	(4)
2016–2017	FC Biolog-Novokubansk	27	(3)
2018–2021	FC Volgar Astrakhan	55	(6)
2021	FC Dynamo Bryansk	16	(3)
- * Club domestic league appearances and goals

Andrei Valentinovich Zenin (Russian: Андрей Валентинович Зенин; born 4 March 1991) is a Russian former football player.

== Club career ==
He made his debut in the Russian Second Division for FC Volgar Astrakhan on 16 July 2012 in a game against FC Energiya Volzhsky. He made his Russian Football National League debut for Volgar on 25 October 2014 in a game against FC Tom Tomsk.
