= Sergey Karetnik =

Ukrainian footballer

Serhiy Karetnyk
Personal information
- Full name: Serhiy Volodymyrovych Karetnyk
- Date of birth: 14 February 1995 (age 31)
- Place of birth: Lubny, Ukraine
- Height: 1.92 m (6 ft 4 in)
- Position: Midfielder

Team information
- Current team: Poltava

Youth career
- 2006: FC Molod Poltava
- 2008–2011: Dynamo Kyiv

Senior career*
Years	Team	Apps	(Gls)
2013–2016	Kuban Krasnodar	13	(1)
2014	→ Metalurh Donetsk (loan)	1	(0)
2016–2017	Anzhi Makhachkala	0	(0)
2017	Tom Tomsk	3	(0)
2017	Olimpiyets Nizhny Novgorod	10	(1)
2019	Palanga	10	(0)
2019	Ararat Yerevan	1	(0)
2020	Yenisey Krasnoyarsk	2	(0)
2020	Dynamo Bryansk	15	(1)
2021	Shinnik Yaroslavl	10	(0)
2021	Khimik Dzerzhinsk	11	(1)
2022	Dynamo Vladivostok	0	(0)
2022–2023	Poltava	14	(1)
2023–	Olimpiya Savyntsi		

International career
2010–2011	Ukraine U16	15	(0)
- * Club domestic league appearances and goals

Serhiy Volodymyrovych Karetnyk (Ukrainian: Сергій Володимирович Каретник; Russian: Сергей Владимирович Каретник; born 15 February 1995) is a Ukrainian football midfielder. He plays for Olimpiya Savyntsi. Previously for almost 10 years, he played in the Russian Federation.

== Career ==
He is the product of the FC Dynamo Kyiv and the FC Molod Poltava youth sportive systems. Then he transferred to Russia and played for several clubs there up until 2022. From January 2014 he played on loan for FC Metalurh Donetsk in the Ukrainian Premier League.

He made his Russian Premier League debut for FC Kuban Krasnodar against FC Ufa on 24 April 2015.

On 14 February 2019 became a member of Lithuanian FK Palanga.

== International ==
Karetnyk played for the Ukraine-16 in several youth championships.

== Personal life ==
His father Volodymyr Karetnyk played in the Ukrainian Premier League in the 1990s for FC Zorya-MALS Luhansk, MFC Kremin Kremenchuk, FC Prykarpattya Ivano-Frankivsk and FC Nyva Ternopil.
