= List of people from Omsk =

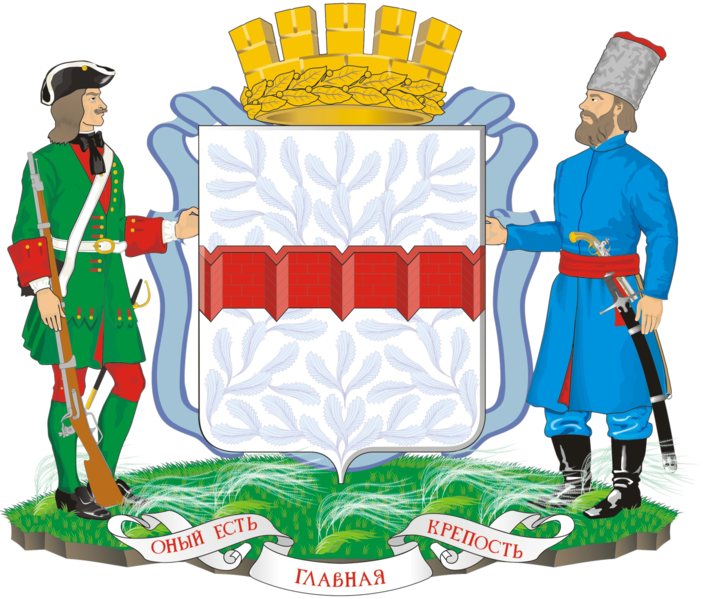
Coat of Arms of Omsk

This is a list of notable people who were born or have lived in Omsk, Russia.

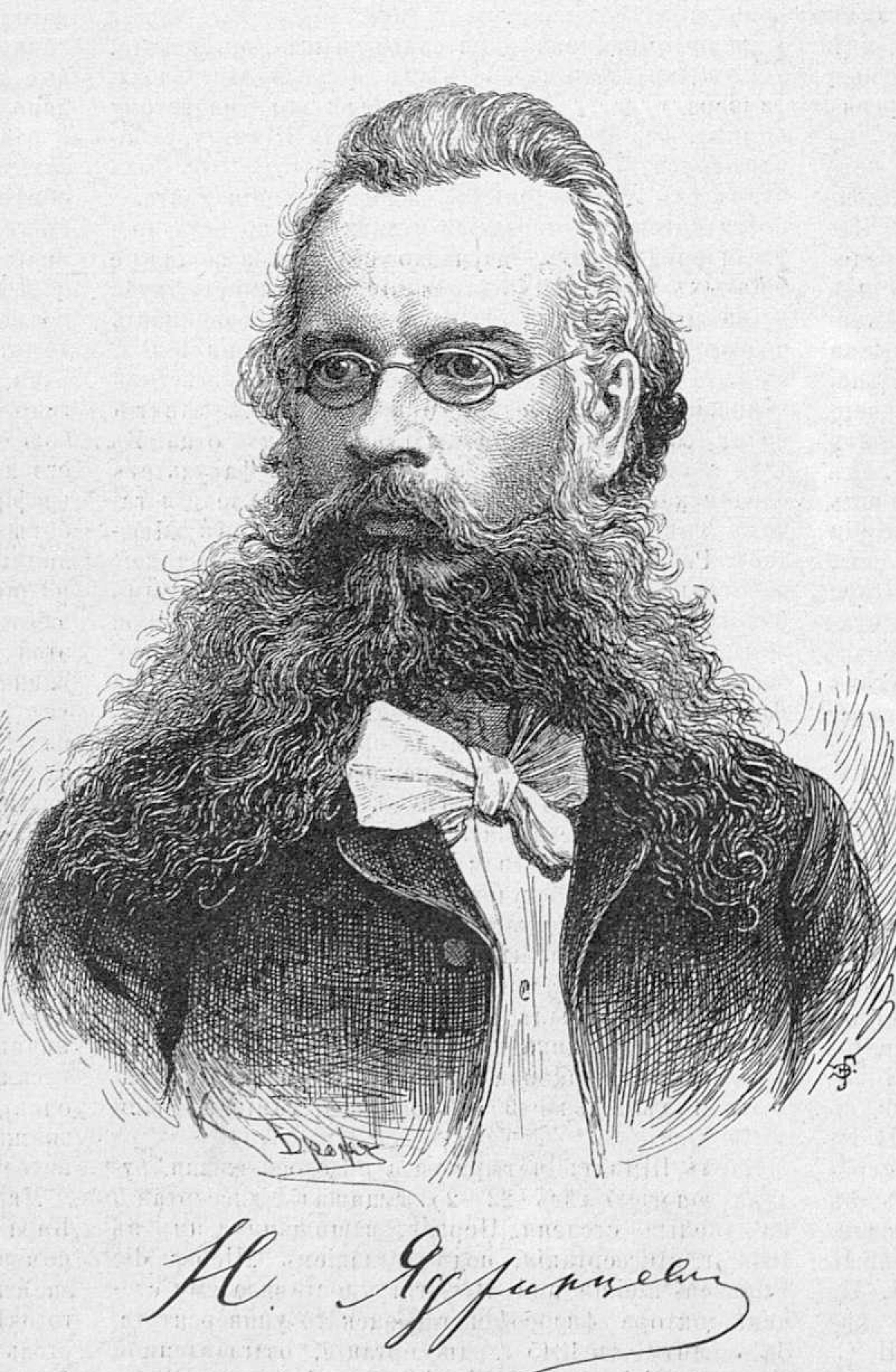
Nikolai Yadrintsev (1842–1894)

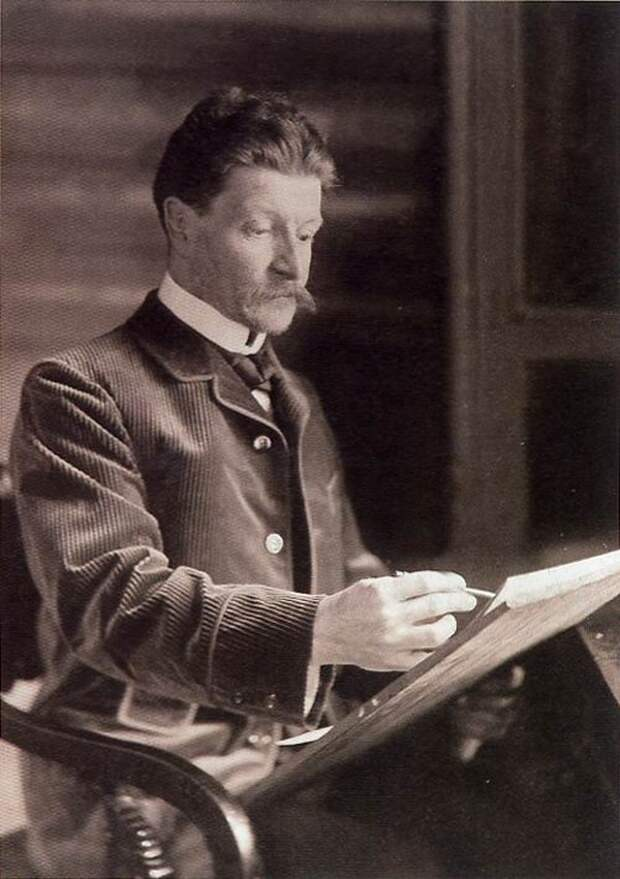
Mikhail Vrubel (1856–1910)

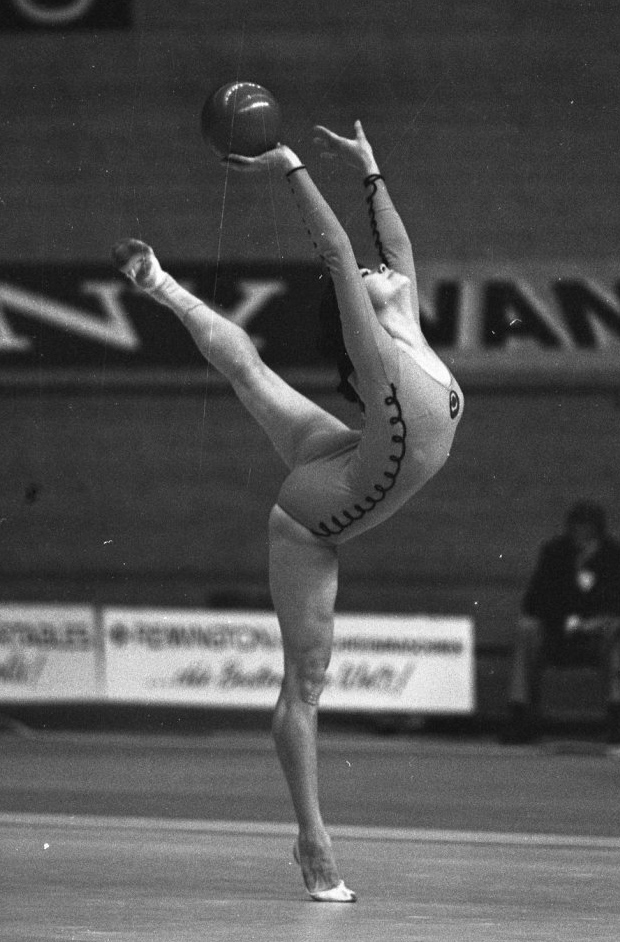
Galima Shugurova (born 1953)

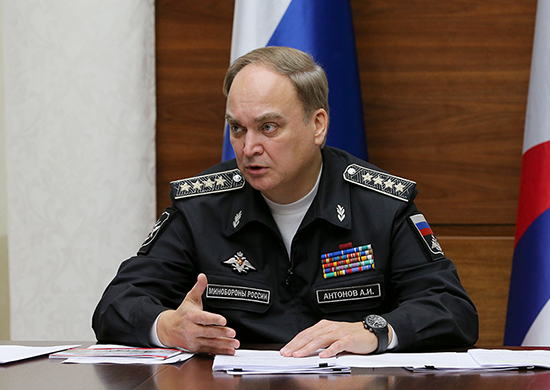
Anatoly Antonov (born 1955)

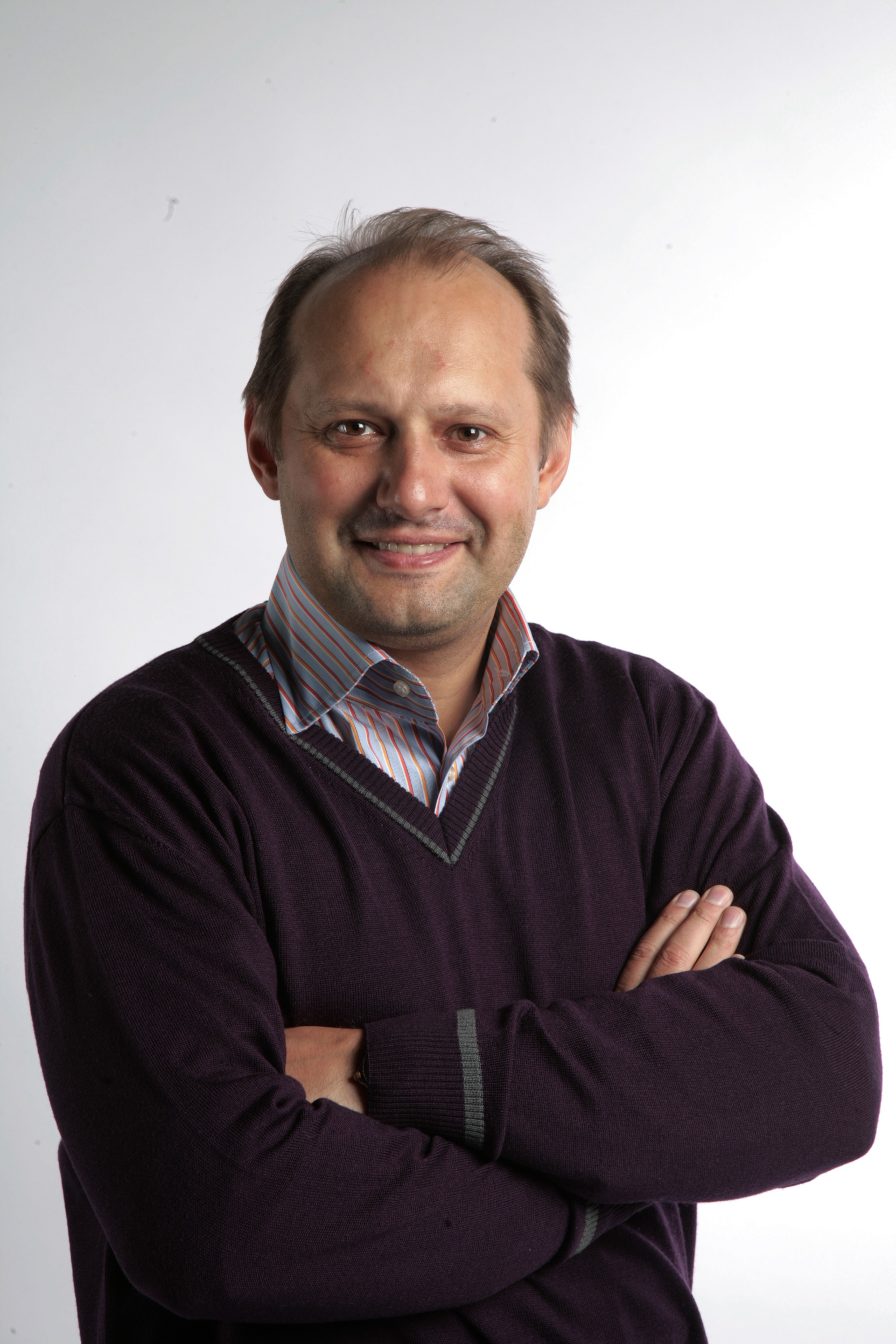
Andrey Antropov (born 1967)

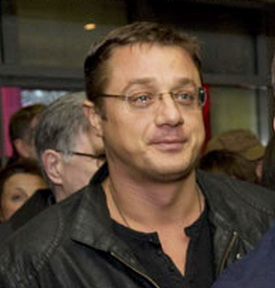
Alexei Makarov (born 1972)

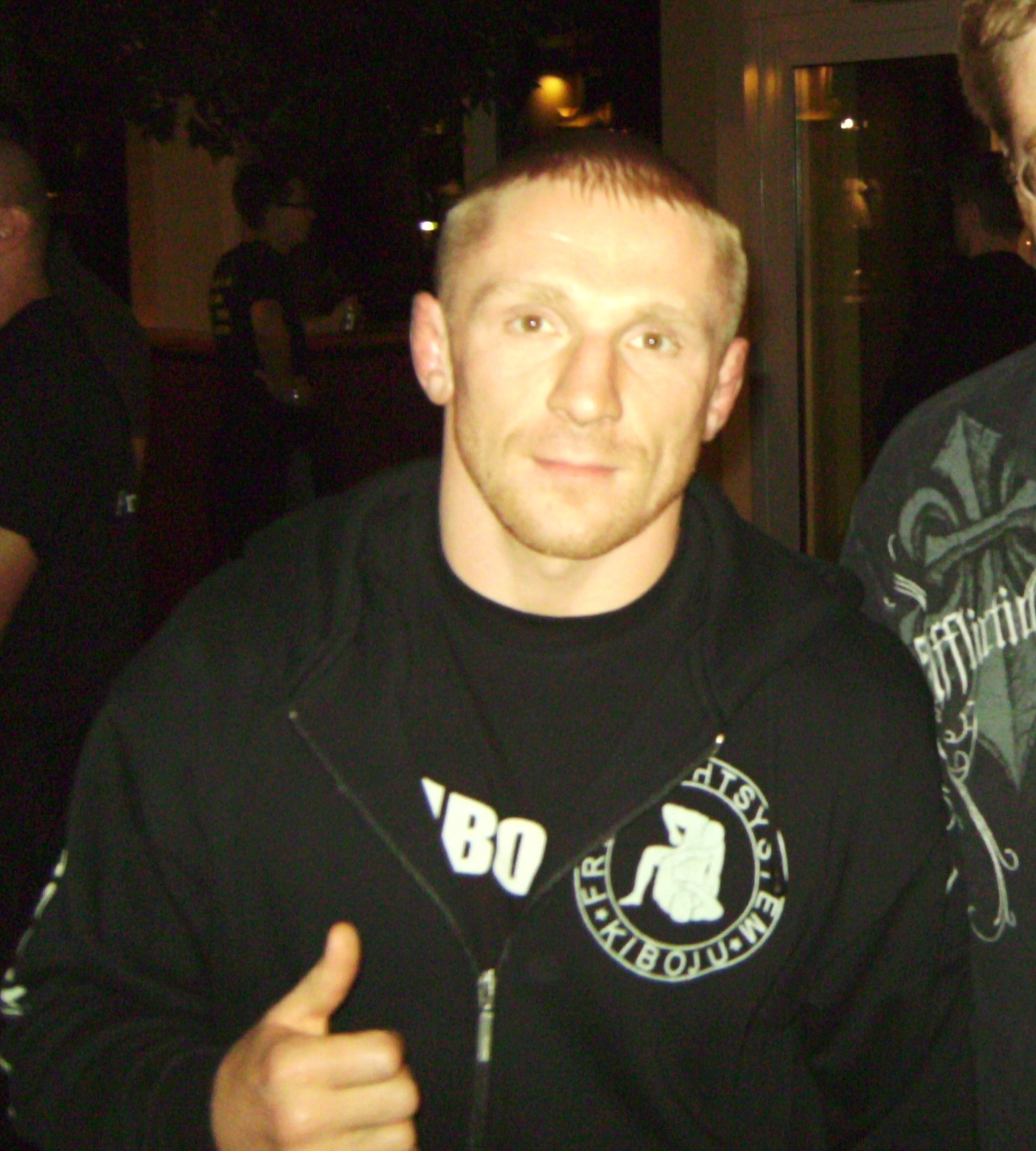
Dennis Siver (born 1979)

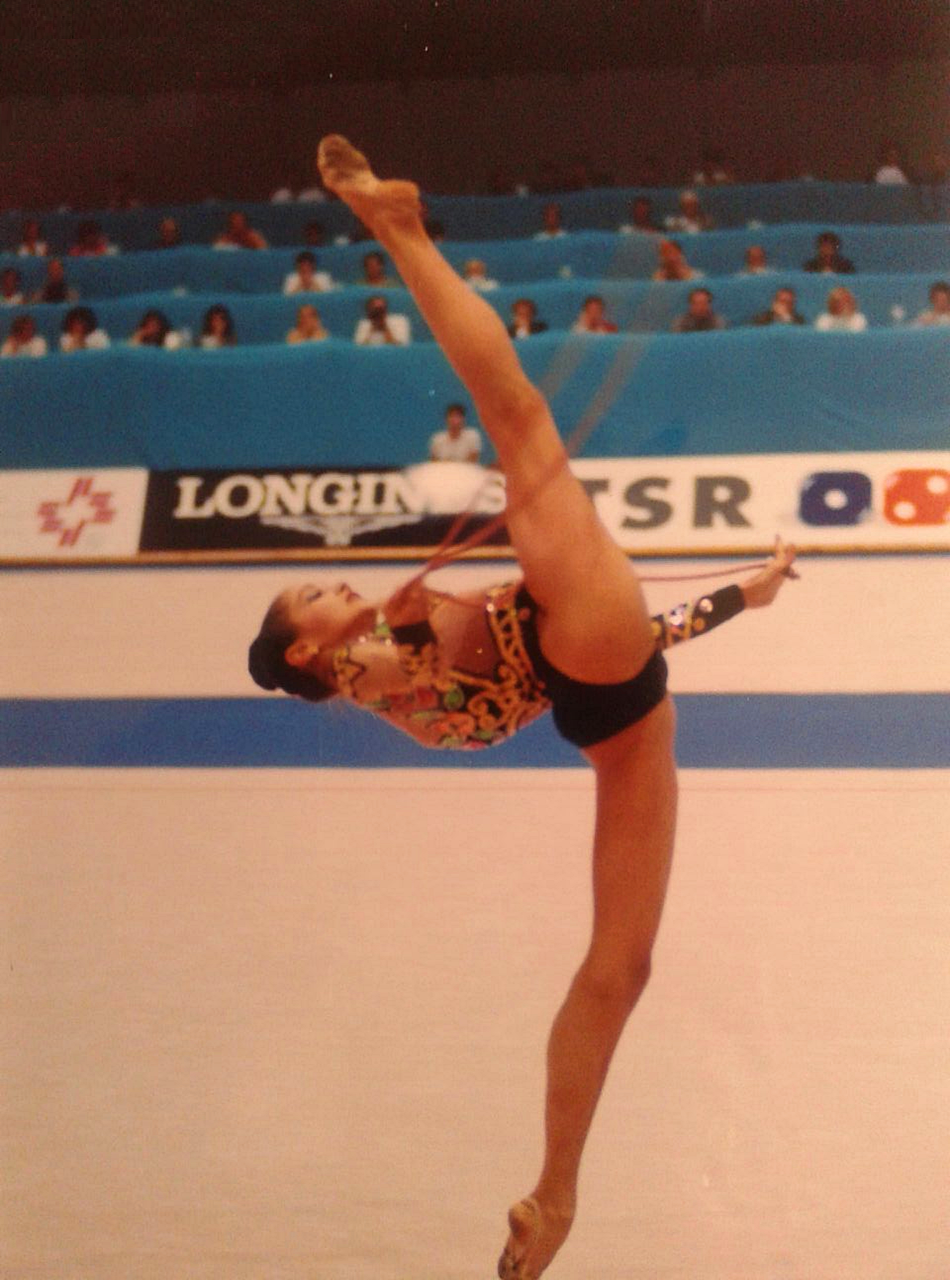
Irina Tchachina (born 1982)

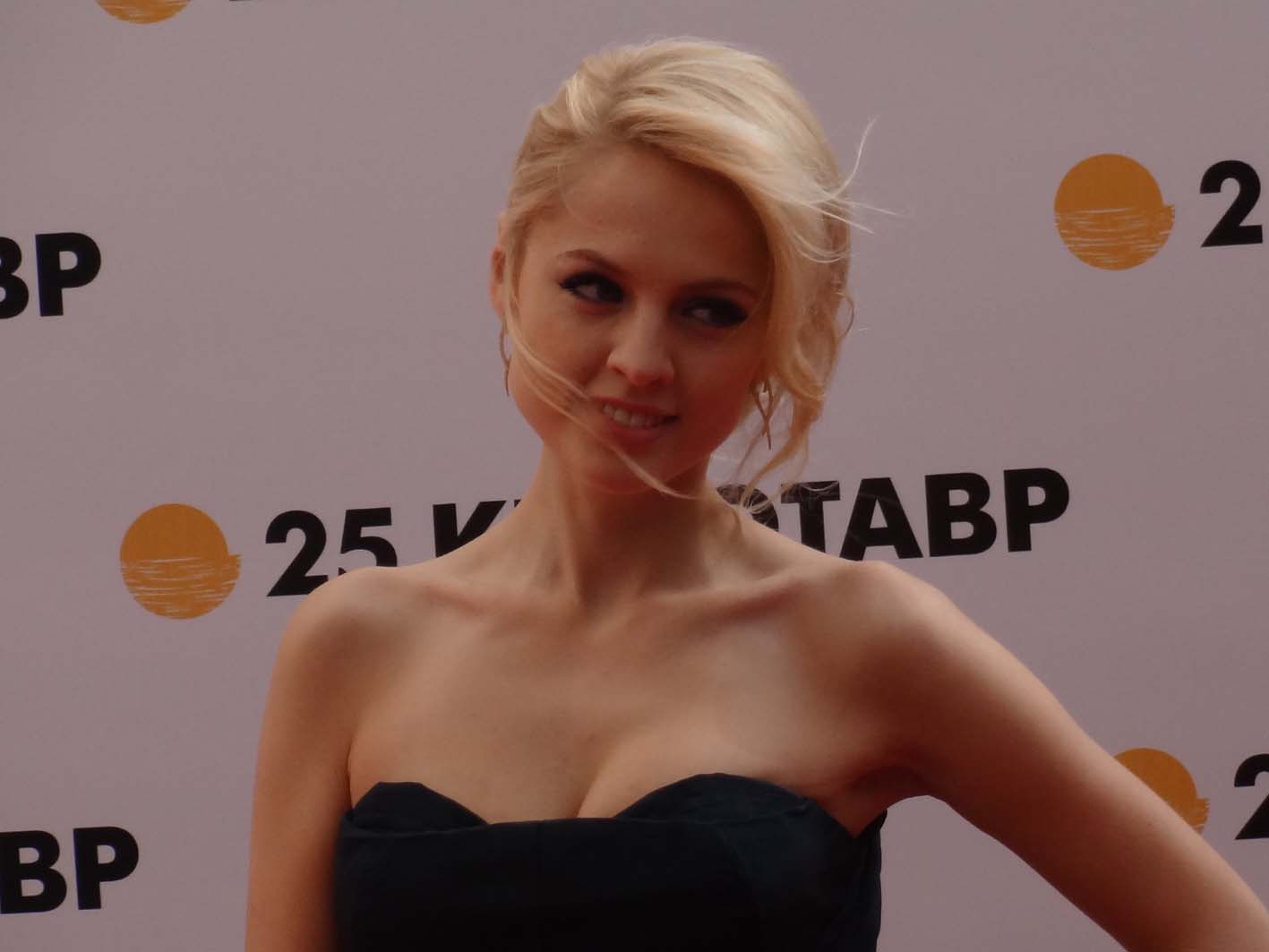
Yanina Studilina (born 1985)

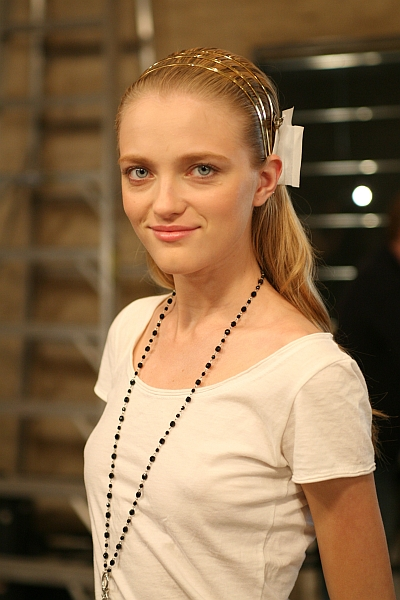
Vlada Roslyakova (born 1987)

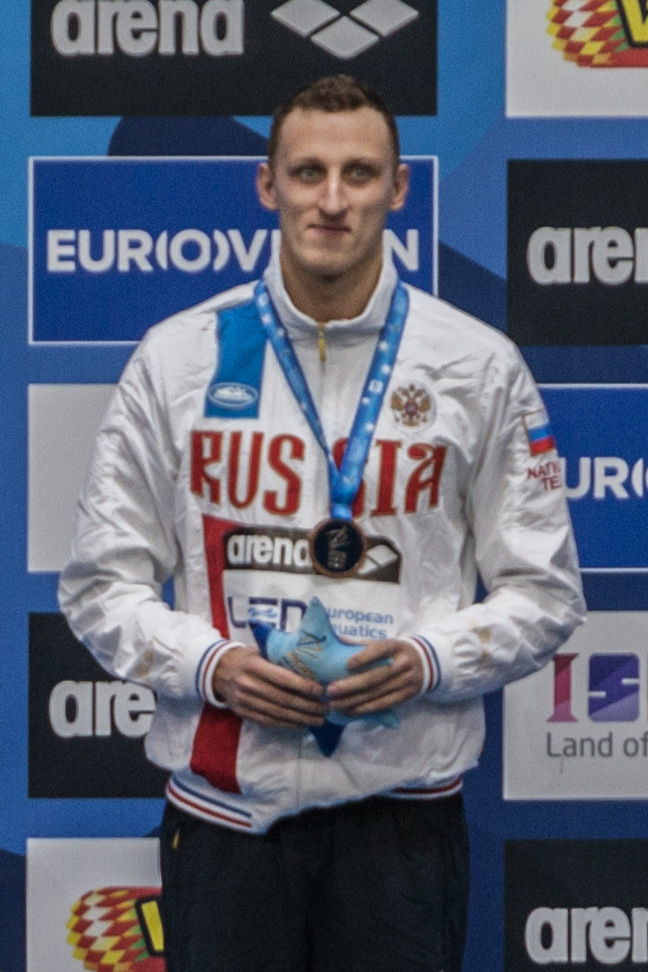
Nikita Konovalov (born 1988)

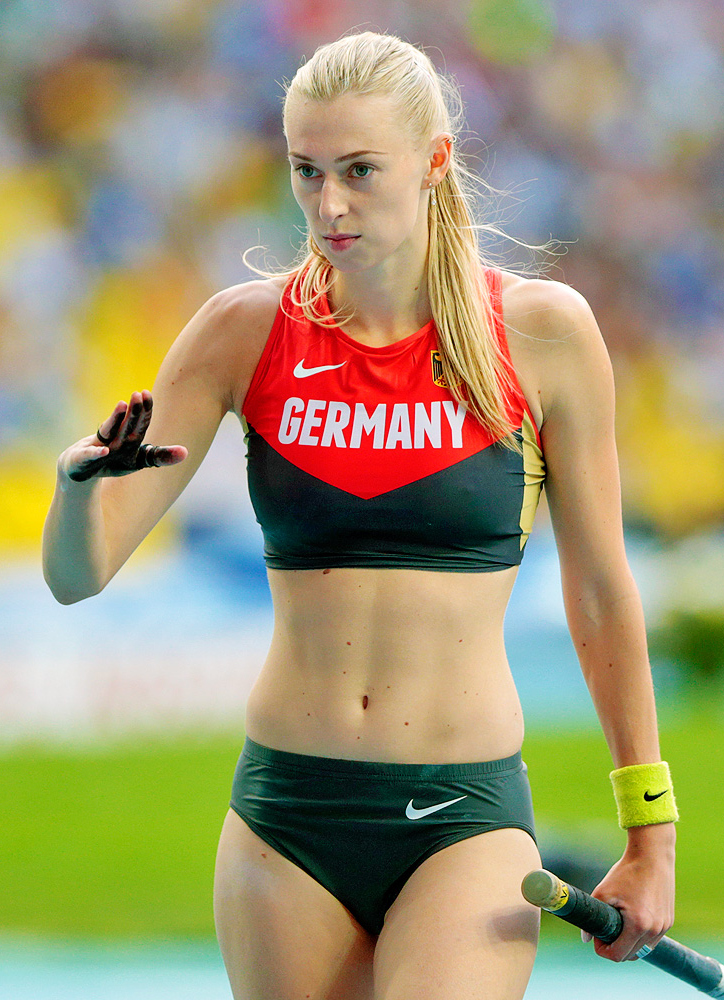
Lisa Ryzih (born 1988)

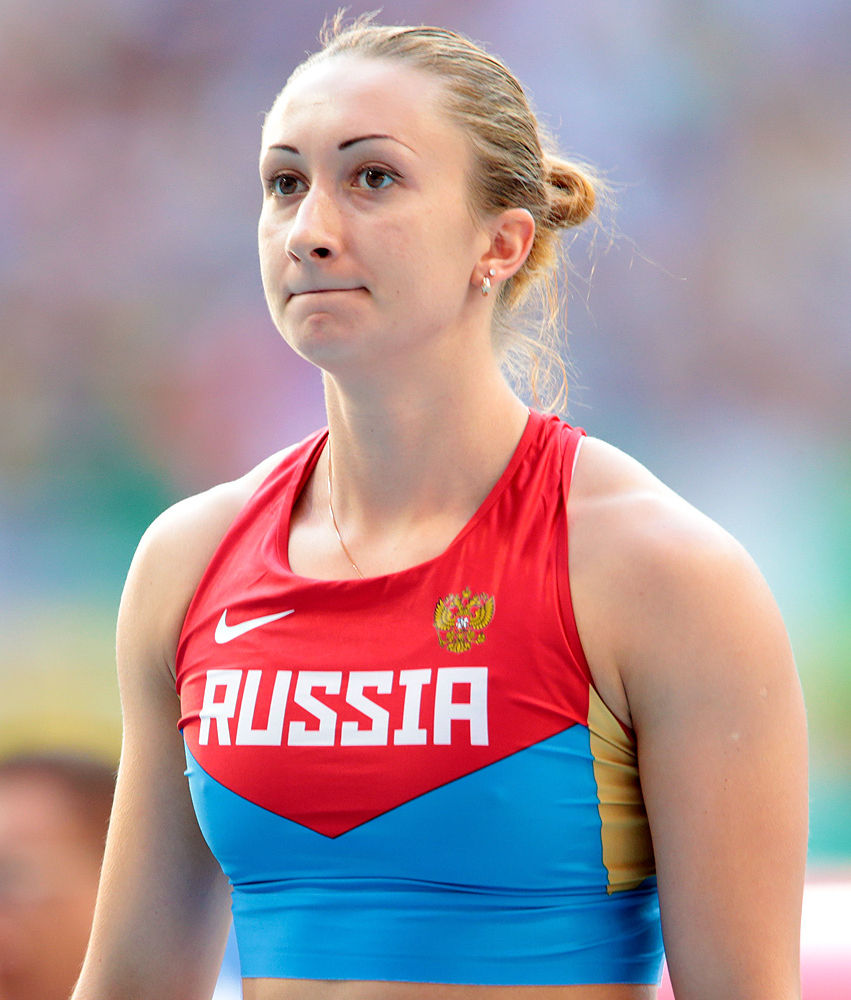
Anastasia Savchenko (born 1989)

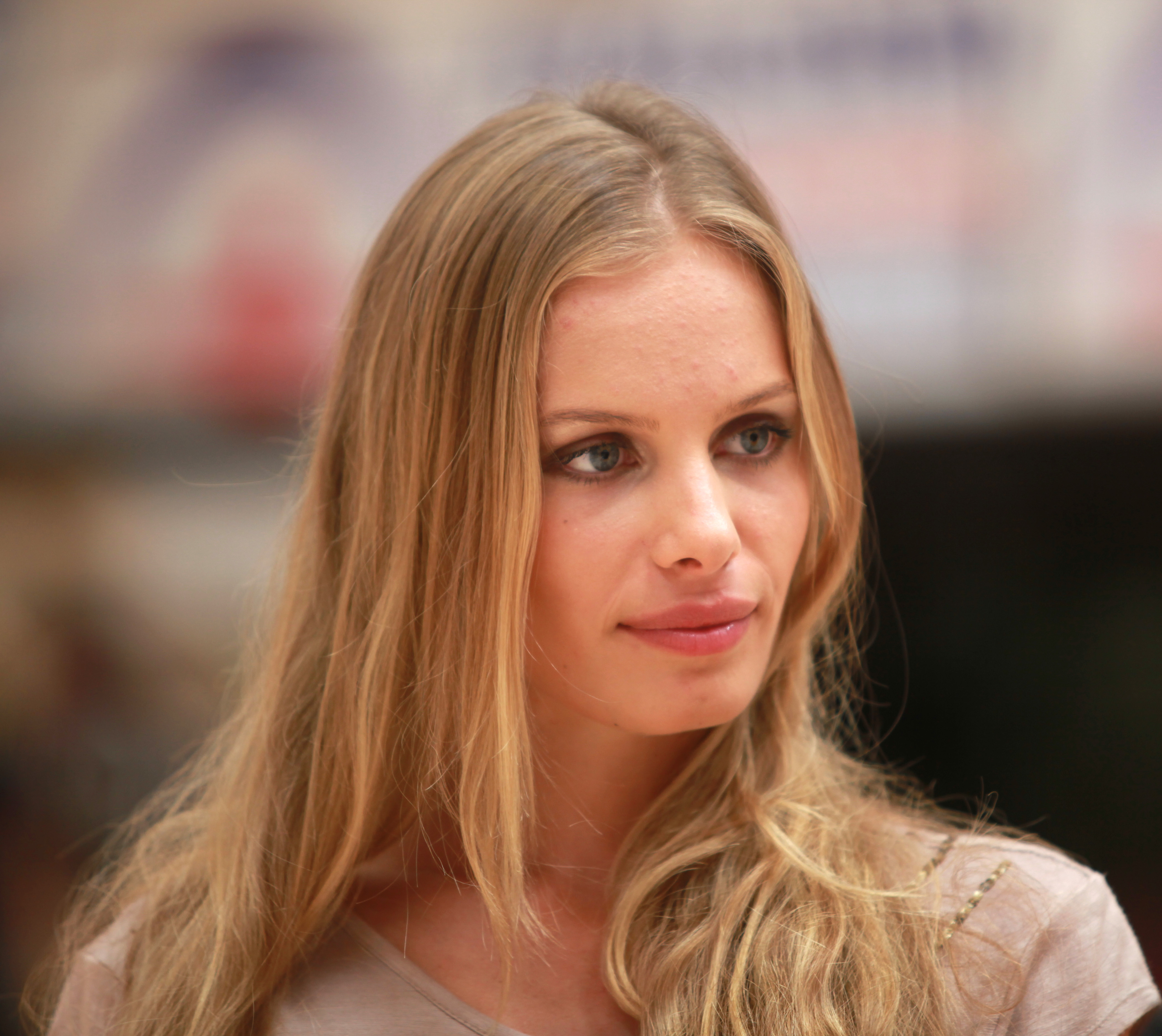
Jana Beller (born 1990)

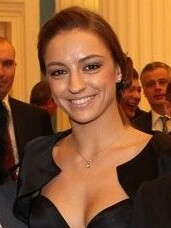
Yevgeniya Kanayeva (born 1990)

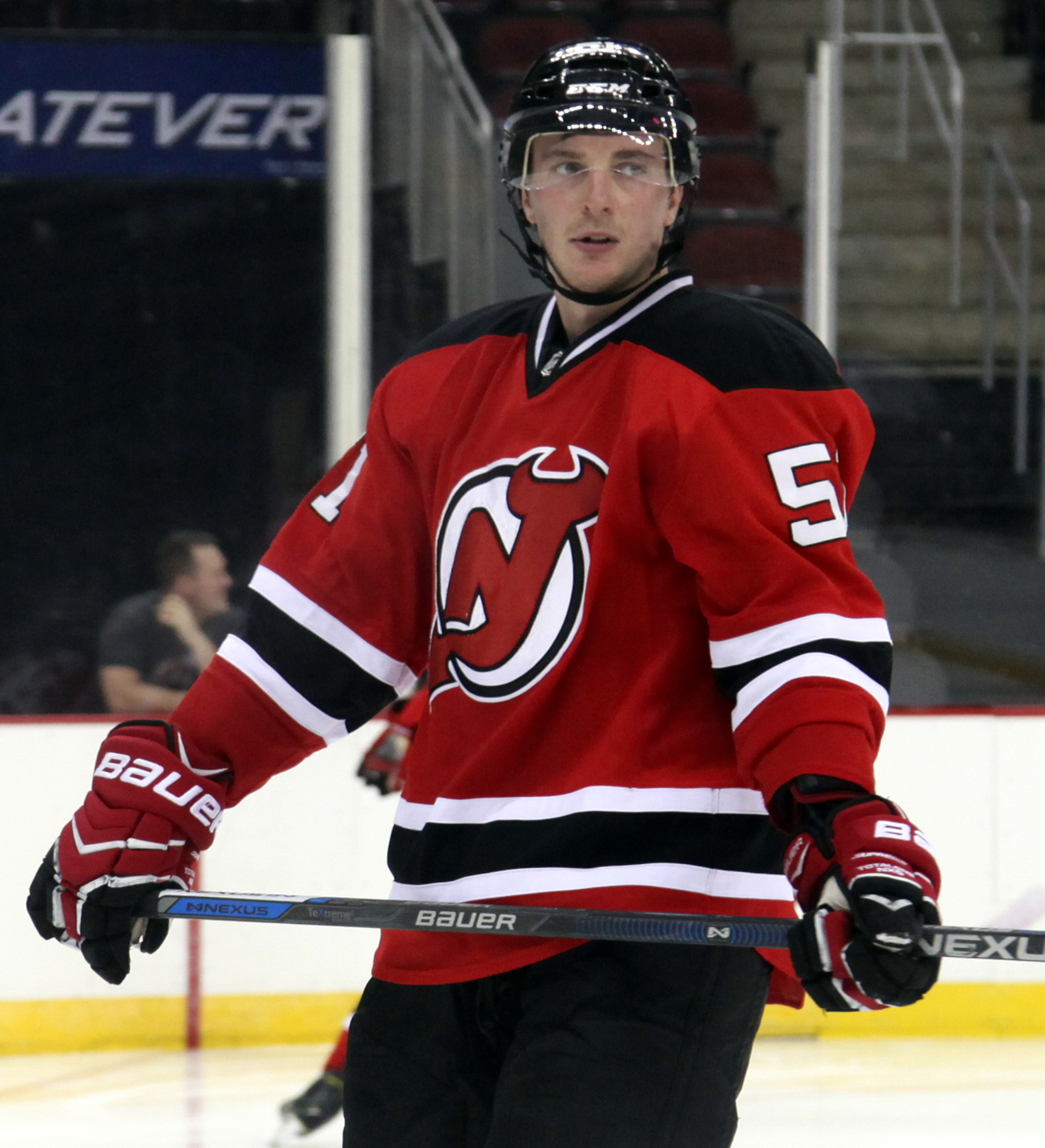
Sergei Kalinin (born 1991)

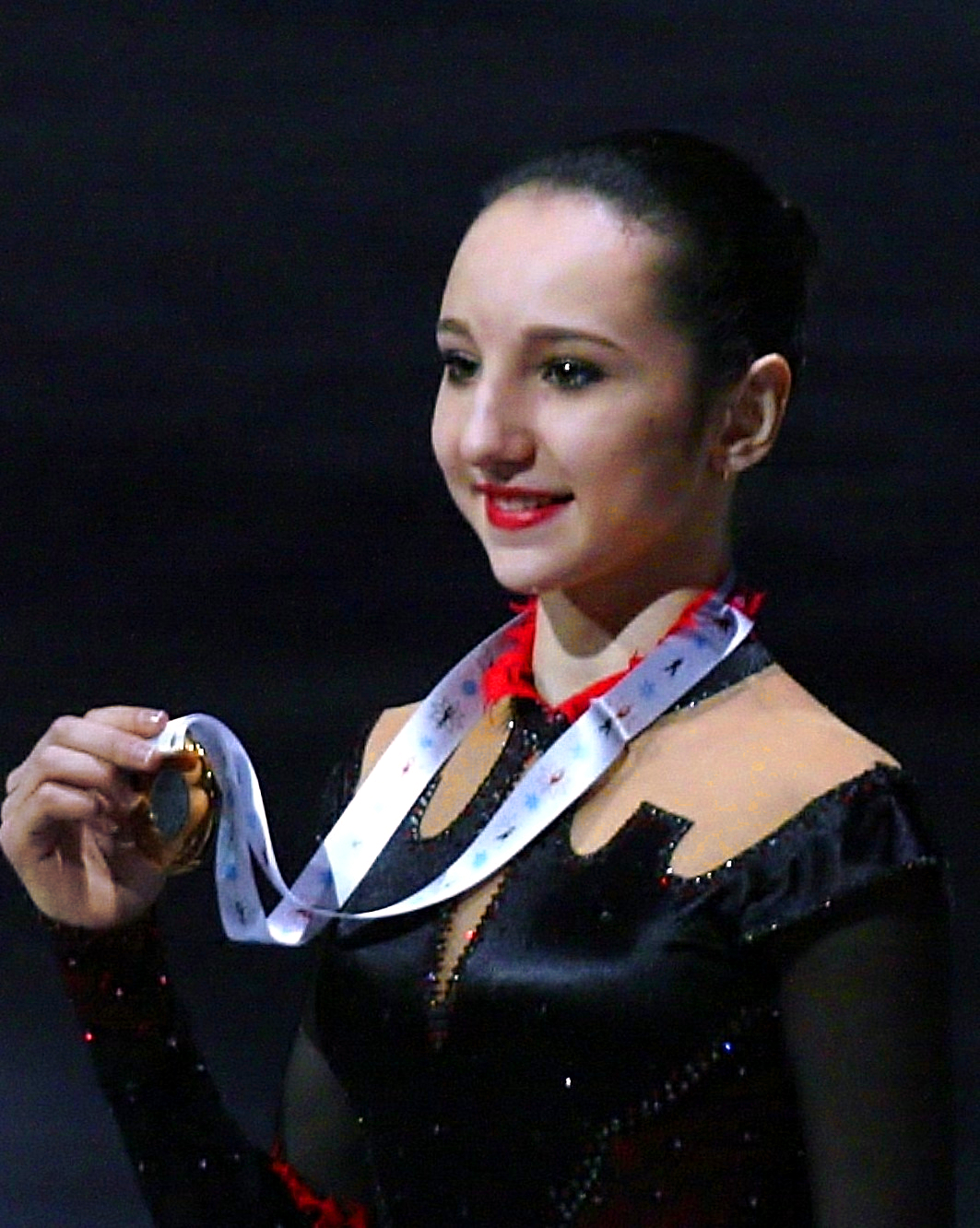
Polina Tsurskaya (born 2001)

== Born in Omsk ==
=== 19th century ===
==== 1801–1850 ====
- Nikolai Yadrintsev (1842–1894), Russian public figure, explorer, archaeologist and turkologist

==== 1851–1900 ====
- Innokenty Annensky (1855–1909), Russian poet, critic and translator
- Mikhail Vrubel (1856–1910), Russian painter
- Wacław Iwaszkiewicz-Rudoszański (1871–1922), Polish general
- Dmitry Karbyshev (1880–1945), officer of the Russian Imperial Army, Red Army general, professor of the Soviet General Staff Academy (Doctor of Military Sciences) and Hero of the Soviet Union (posthumously)
- Valerian Kuybyshev (1888–1935), Russian revolutionary, Red Army officer and prominent Soviet politician
- Anatol Josepho (1894–1980), Russian immigrant, who invented and patented the first automated photo booth in 1925, which was named the "Photomaton"

=== 20th century ===
==== 1901–1950 ====
- Vissarion Shebalin (1902–1963), Soviet composer
- Leonid Martynov (1905–1980), Russian poet
- Nina Arkhipova (1921–2016), Soviet and Russian film and stage actress
- Valentina Talyzina (1935–2025), Soviet and Russian film and stage actress
- Yuri Titov (born 1935), Russian gymnast, Olympic champion and four times world champion
- Vladimir Lukin (born 1937), Russian liberal political activist
- Vladislav Dvorzhetsky (1939–1978), Soviet film actor
- Igor Berezovsky (1942–2007), Russian painter, printmaker and graphic designer
- Viktor Igumenov (born 1943), Russian wrestler
- Vitaly Tseshkovsky (1944–2011), Russian chess Grandmaster and a former champion of the USSR
- Viktor Blinov (1945–1968), Soviet ice hockey player
- Yuri Shatalov (1945–2018), Soviet ice hockey player
- Viktor Bazhenov (born 1946), Soviet fencer
- Nikolai Kormiltsev (born 1946), Commander-in-Chief of the Russian Ground Forces from 2001 to 2004
- Lyubov Polishchuk (1949–2006), Russian actress
- Vera Krasnova (born 1950), Russian speed skater

==== 1951–1960 ====
- Eduard Rapp (born 1951), Soviet cyclist
- Vladimir Yumin (1951–2016), Soviet Russian wrestler and Olympic champion in freestyle wrestling
- Alexander Gorban (1952–2025), British scientist of Russian origin
- Aleksandr Ivchenko (born 1952), Russian professional football coach and a former player
- Galima Shugurova (born 1953), Soviet rhythmic gymnast
- Vilis Krištopans (born 1954), Latvian politician
- Tamāra Vilerte (born 1954), Latvian chess player
- Anatoly Antonov (born 1955), Russian deputy minister of defence
- Aleksandr Muzychenko (born 1955), Soviet/Russian sailor, Olympic champion for the USSR team
- Alexander Ivanov (born 1956), Russian American chess Grandmaster
- Viktor Ivanov (born 1960), Russian football player

==== 1961–1970 ====
- Sergei Chikishev (born 1961), Russian football manager and a former player
- Oleg Imrekov (1962–2014), Russian professional footballer
- Natalya Starovoyt (born 1962), actress of Penza Oblast Drama Theatre
- Yegor Letov (1964–2008), Russian poet, musician, singer-songwriter, audio engineer and conceptual art painter
- Alexander Volkov (born 1964), Soviet-Ukraine professional basketball player of Russian ethnicity
- Andrey Antropov (born 1967), Russian male badminton player
- Oleg Maltsev (born 1967), Russian judoka
- Igor Khankeyev (born 1968), Russian professional football coach and a former player
- Marat Mulashev (born 1968), Russian professional football coach and a former player
- Sergei Osipov (born 1968), Russian professional football coach and a former player
- Viacheslav Zakhartsov (born 1968), Russian chess Grandmaster
- Tatiana Druchinina (born 1969), Soviet rhythmic gymnast
- Abdul-Vahed Niyazov (born 1969), Russian businessman
- Siman Povarenkin (born 1969), Russian entrepreneur
- Vladimir Shcherbak (born 1970), Russian football manager
- Konstantin Ushakov (born 1970), Russian volleyball player

==== 1971–1980 ====
- Konstantin Landa (1972–2022), Russian chess Grandmaster
- Alexei Makarov (born 1972), Russian actor of theatre and cinema
- Kirill Petrenko (born 1972), Russian-Austrian conductor
- Andrey Morev (1973–2025), Russian-Kazakhstani football goalkeeper
- Natalia Goudkova (born 1974), Russian Paralympian athlete
- Andrey Korneyev (1974–2014), Russian breaststroke swimmer
- Oleg Kuleshov (born 1974), Russian handball player
- Dimitri Lykin (born 1974), Russian sport shooter
- Dmitry Chernyshyov (born 1975), Russian swimmer
- Denis Pimankov (born 1975), Russian freestyle swimmer
- Tatyana Tishchenko (born 1975), Russian sprint canoer
- Olga Nazarova (born 1977), Russian-born Belarusian biathlete
- Anastasija Reiberger (born 1977), Russian-born German pole vaulter
- Aleksei Martynov (born 1978), Russian professional footballer
- Ludmilla Radchenko (born 1978), Russian model, artist and actress
- Dennis Siver (born 1979), Russian-German mixed martial artist
- Eduard Kunz (born 1980), Russian pianist
- Alexander Sazonov (born 1980), Russian professional ice hockey defenceman
- Roman Sludnov (born 1980), Russian breaststroke swimmer
- Eduard Troyanovsky (born 1980), Russian professional boxer and IBF and IBO junior welterweight champion

==== 1981–1990 ====
===== 1981–1985 =====
- Konstantin Baranov (born 1982), Russian professional ice hockey player
- Elena Chistilina (born 1982), Russian Paralympic athlete
- Dmitry Kovalyov (born 1982), Russian handball player
- Alexander Svitov (born 1982), Russian professional ice hockey forward
- Irina Tchachina (born 1982), Russian individual rhythmic gymnast
- Nina Yevteyeva (born 1982), Russian short track speed skater
- Olga Graf (born 1983), Russian speed skater
- Dmitry Jakovenko (born 1983), Russian chess grandmaster
- Denis Kulyash (born 1983), Russian professional ice hockey defenceman
- Valentina Savchenkova (born 1983), Russian football defender
- Dmitri Sychev (born 1983), Russian association footballer
- Andrei Taratukhin (born 1983), Russian professional ice hockey centre
- Tatiana Borodulina (born 1984), Russian short-track speed skater
- Elena Ivashchenko (1984–2013), Russian judoka
- Vladimir Leshonok (born 1984), Russian professional footballer
- Yuri Mamaev (born 1984), Russian football midfielder
- Aleksandr Novikov (born 1984), Russian professional football player
- Alexander Shlemenko (born 1984), Russian mixed martial artist
- Aleksei Tishchenko (born 1984), Russian amateur boxer
- Dmitri Poline (born 1985), Russian paralympic swimmer
- Yanina Studilina (born 1985), Russian theater and film actress, fashion model, TV presenter

===== 1986–1990 =====
- Evgeny Dubrovin (born 1986), Russian professional ice hockey defenceman
- Nikita Nikitin (born 1986), Russian professional ice hockey defenseman
- Vladimir Pervushin (born 1986), Russian professional ice hockey forward
- Arkadi Sergeev (born 1986), Russian competitive ice dancer
- Petr Ignatenko (born 1987), Russian professional road racing cyclist
- Vladimir Ponomaryov (born 1987), Russian professional football player
- Vlada Roslyakova (born 1987), Russian model
- Andrey Vorontsevich (born 1987), Russian professional basketball player
- Oleg Zhestkov (born 1987), Russian sprint canoeist
- Vladimir Dyadyun (born 1988), Russian football striker
- Alexei Ivanov (born 1988), Kazakhstani professional ice hockey goaltender of Russian ethnicity
- Nikita Konovalov (born 1988), Russian swimmer
- Lisa Ryzih (born 1988), Russian-born German pole vault athlete
- Egor Averin (born 1989), Russian professional ice hockey forward
- Igor Paderin (born 1989), Russian professional football player
- Anastasia Savchenko (born 1989), Russian pole vaulter
- Denis Shcherbak (born 1989), Russian professional footballer
- Kirill Startsev (born 1989), Russian professional ice hockey player
- Jana Beller (born 1990), Russian German model
- Yevgeniya Kanayeva (born 1990), Russian individual rhythmic gymnast
- Andrey Koreshkov (born 1990), Russian mixed martial artist
- Dmitri Malyaka (born 1990), Russian football player
- Eldar Ragib Ogly Mamedov (born 1990), Russian professional football player
- Samvel Mnatsyan (born 1990), Russian professional ice hockey defenceman
- Evgeny Orlov (born 1990), Russian professional ice hockey forward
- Anastasia Panchenko (born 1990), Russian sprint canoer
- Theo Vogelsang (born 1990), German footballer

==== 1991–2000 ====
- Sergei Kalinin (born 1991), Russian professional ice hockey forward
- Dmitry Maltsev (born 1991), Russian ice hockey player
- Nikita Pivtsakin (born 1991), Russian professional ice hockey defenceman
- Nikita Prokhorov (born 1991), Russian athlete
- Eduard Reizvikh (born 1991), Russian professional ice hockey goaltender
- Roman Berdnikov (born 1992), Russian professional ice hockey player
- Darya Melnikova (born 1992), Russian actress of theater, film and television
- Kirill Rasskazov (born 1992), Russian ice hockey player
- Semyon Zherebtsov (born 1992), Russian professional ice hockey player
- Alexander Hahn (born 1993), German footballer
- Dmitri Jaškin (born 1993), Russian-born Czech ice hockey player
- Maxim Kazakov (born 1993), Russian professional ice hockey player
- Evgeny Mozer (born 1993), Russian professional ice hockey player
- Kirill Semyonov (born 1994), Russian professional ice hockey player
- Anna Shibanova (born 1994), Russian ice hockey defender
- Tatyana Shibanova (born 1994), Russian ice hockey player
- Ksenia Dudkina (born 1995), Russian group rhythmic gymnast
- Denis Kostin (born 1995), Russian professional ice hockey goaltender
- Vladislav Oslonovskiy (born 1995), Russian football midfielder
- Yegor Rudkovskiy (born 1996), Russian football player
- Vladislav Artemiev (born 1998), Russian chess player
- Vera Biryukova (born 1998), Russian group rhythmic gymnast
- Sofya Skomorokh (born 1999), Russian group rhythmic gymnast
- Mariia Kravtsova (born 2000), Russian group rhythmic gymnast

=== 21st century ===
- Polina Tsurskaya (born 2001), Russian competitive figure skater
- Anastasia Simakova (born 2004), Russian individual rhythmic gymnast

== Lived in Omsk ==
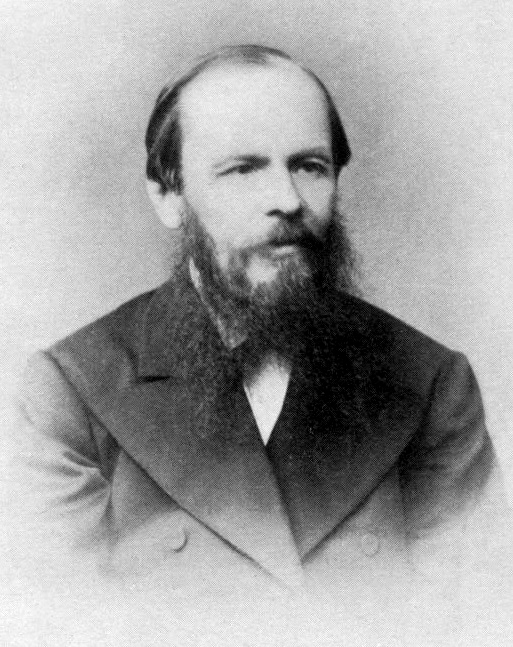
Fyodor Dostoyevsky (1821–1881)

- Fyodor Dostoyevsky (1821–1881), Russian novelist, short story writer, essayist, journalist and philosopher; in exile 1849–1854
- Alexander Kolchak (1874–1920), Russian polar explorer and commander in the Imperial Russian Navy
- Nikolai Riumin, chess master
- Vikentii Trofimov (1878–1956), Russian painter
- Mikhail Ulyanov (1927–2007), Soviet and Russian actor
- Vladimir Barnashov (born 1951), Soviet former biathlete
- German Gref (born 1964), Russian statesman and top manager; attended Omsk State University 1985–1990
- Jaromír Jágr (born in 1972), Czech ice hockey player, played in Avangard Omsk in 2008–2011.

== See also ==
- List of Russian people
- List of Russian-language poets
