= Imrekov =

Imrekov (masculine, Russian: Имреков) or Imrekova (feminine, Russian: Имрекова) is a Russian surname. Notable footballers with the surname include:

- Oleg Imrekov (1962–2014)
  - Arkadi Imrekov (born 1985), his son
  - Viktor Imrekov (born 1985), his son
