= Sergei Osipov =

Sergei Osipov or Sergey Osipov may refer to:

- Sergei Osipov (artist) (1915–1985), Russian artist and educator, the Leningrad School painter.
- Sergei Osipov (footballer, born 1978), Russian association football player
- Sergei Osipov (footballer, born 1968), Russian association football player and manager
- Sergei Osipov (luger), Russian Olympic luger
