= Khorosho!! =

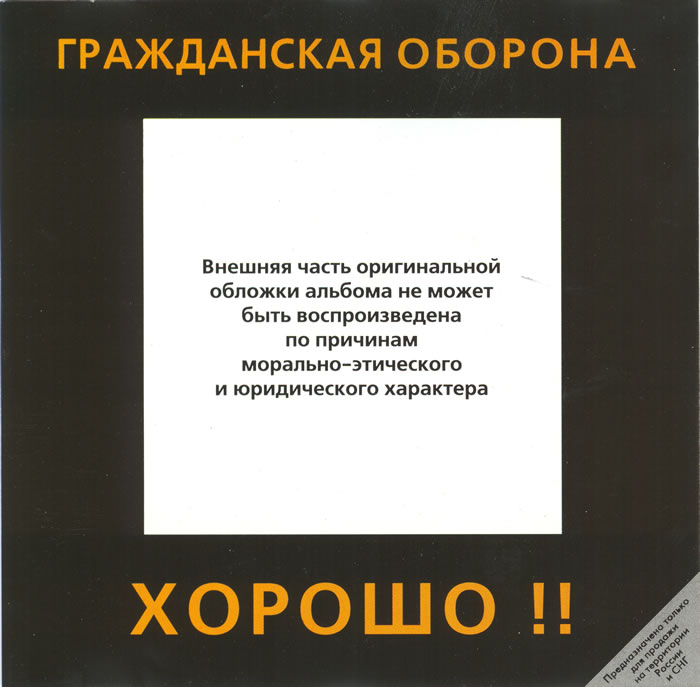

Studio album by Grazhdanskaya Oborona
- Released: 1987 - Samizdat (Magnitoalbom I); 1987 - Samizdat (Magnitoalbom II); 1988 - Samizdat (Magnitoalbom III); 1996 - Cassette; 1999 - CD; 2007, 2015 - CD Reissue; 2024 - LP
- Recorded: June 1987
- Studios: GrOb studio (Egor Letov's flat), Omsk
- Genres: Punk-rock, Noise-punk, Garage punk
- Length: 32:06; 63:58 (Reissue with bonus tracks)
- Labels: GrOb Records (Self-released), Hor (1996, 1999), Misteria zvuka (2007); Wyrgorod (2015, 2024)

Grazhdanskaya Oborona chronology
Myshelovka (1987)	Khorosho!! (1987)	Totalitarizm (1987)

Khorosho!! or Horosho!! (Russian: Хорошо!!, lit. 'Good!!') is the fifth official album of Grazhdanskaya Oborona. One of a series of albums from 1987 by Grazhdanskaya Oborona, along with "Myshelovka (Mousetrap)", "Totalitarizm (Totalitarianism)", "Nekrofiliya (Necrophilia)" and "Krasnyy albom (Red album)". Like for every album from this series, Egor Letov plays alone on all instruments. In 2006, the label "Misteria zvuka" added the demo album "Igra v biser pered svinyami (Playing beads game in front of pigs)" to the reissue of the album as a bonus.

== Story of the album ==
In the spring and summer 1987, Letov, forcibly being the only member of Grazhdanskaya Oborona, played instruments by himself by successively superimposing instrumental parts one on top of the other, songs written from the end of 1986 - start of 1987 were released under this album (songs that were written earlier - released under Myshelovka, later - Totalitarizm).

=== Album composition ===
During Soviet times, underground artists (such as Grazhdanskaya Oborona) released their albums by Samizdat which was illegal. Letov by this tradition, released albums with around 30 minutes in length however, while recording "Totalitarizm" the album was too long so he decided to release songs under other albums. Because of this, songs «Zdrastvuy, cherniy ponedelnik» (No.12), «Horoshij avtobus» (No.10), «Psychedelicheskiy kameshek» (No.15) and «Combat Reggae» (No.7) were included in this album. Song "Navazhdenie" (No.5) was remade in 1988, the original 1987 version was only included in Magnitoalbom I and II (First two self released reel-to-reel recordings).

The song Khoroshij avtobus (Which means "Good bus") was inspired from the story of the man who was in a mental asylum with Egor Letov:

"A "good bus" is a collective term, encompassing many things. One of them has its roots in my time in a mental hospital. I had a very distinguished-looking man of a certain age next to me there, who seemed healthy and fine in every way, except for one thing: for some unknown reason, he would have breakdowns. One day, he was heading to work, to the bus stop, and he didn't have time to get on the bus. Because it was packed. He'd been perfectly normal before, but then something completely drastic happened to him. He started screaming and crying. I ran after him and fell into a semi-comatose state. The bus left without him."

— Egor Letov, 20.02.2005, (Translated from Russian)

==== Album design ====
When the album was going to get officially released on a cassette, Letov was gained an opportunity to design the album cover, his original idea was to put a female genitals on a cover, but it was prohibited so instead they put a text saying (Translated from Russian): "The outer part of the original cover cannot be reproduced due to moral, ethical and legal reasons".

== Track listing ==
All tracks are written by Egor Letov, except № 11: written by — V. Semernin and E. Letov.

No.	Title	Length
1.	"Kogo-to eshe (Someone else's)"	2:23
2.	"Slepite mne masku (Make me a mask)"	3:04
3.	"Bluz (Blues)"	2:00
4.	"Karantin (Quarantine)"	2:12
5.	"Navazhdenie (Obsession)"	2:30
6.	"Nedobitiye tela (Half-dead bodies)"	1:51
7.	"Kombat / Khoroshij tsar i znakomaja von' (Combat reggae)"	2:40
8.	"Khorosho!! (Good!!)"	1:46
9.	"Priyatnogo appetita! (Bon appetit!)"	1:44
10.	"Khoroshiy avtobus (Good bus)"	2:31
11.	"Krasnoje znamije (Red flag)"	2:01
12.	"Zdrastvuy, cherniy ponedelnik (Hello, black monday)"	2:17
13.	"Polniy pizdets (Total bullshit)"	0:47
14.	"V stenu golovoy (Head to the wall)"	2:31
15.	"Psichodelicheskiy kameshek (Psychedelic stone)"	1:49

Bonus-tracks on 2006 reissue version (Igra v biser pered svinyami)
No.	Title	Length
16.	"Igra v biser (Beads game)"	2:23
17.	"Na nashih glazah (On our eyes)"	2:09
18.	"Chuzherodnim elementom (Foreign element)"	2:58
19.	"Ya illuzoren (Im illusioned)"	3:27
20.	"Detskij mir (Child's world)"	1:56
21.	"Zoopark (Zoo)"	2:46
22.	"Tak daleko (Far away)"	1:50
23.	"BG (Boris Grebenshikov)"	2:16
24.	"Sredi zarazhennogo logikoj mira (in the midst of a world infected with logic)"	2:29
25.	"No skoro nastanet sovsem (But soon it will come completely)"	3:01
26.	"Nenavizhu krasnij svet (I hate the colour red)"	2:07
27.	"Mama, mama.."	2:41
28.	"Ubijtsya travi (Killer of the grass)"	1:07

=== Credits ===
- Egor Letov — vocals, guitars, bass, drums.
- Evgeny Filatov — bongos, harmonica (Bonus-tracks 16-28).

Recorded in mid-June 1987 at GrOb Studio; except for bonus tracks 16-28, on June 1, 1986, at the Omsk State University laboratory. Remixed and restored on December 4-5, 2005, at GrOb Studio by Egor Letov and Natalia Chumakova. Design: Egor Letov. Photo: A. Kudryavtsev, GrOb Records archive.
