= Mining in Georgia =

Mining in Georgia may refer to:

- Mining in Georgia (country)
- Mining in Georgia (U.S. state)
