= Zherebtsov =

Zherebtsov (Russian: Жеребцов, from жеребец meaning stallion) is a Russian masculine surname, its feminine counterpart is Zherebtsova. It may refer to

- Oleg Zherebtsov (born 1968), Russian businessman
- Olga Zherebtsova (1766–1849), Russian noble
- Polina Zherebtsova (born 1985), Russian poet and author
- Semyon Zherebtsov (born 1992), Russian ice hockey player
