= Omsk Giftedness Development Center =

Public school in Omsk, Russia

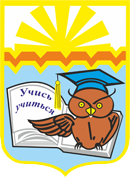

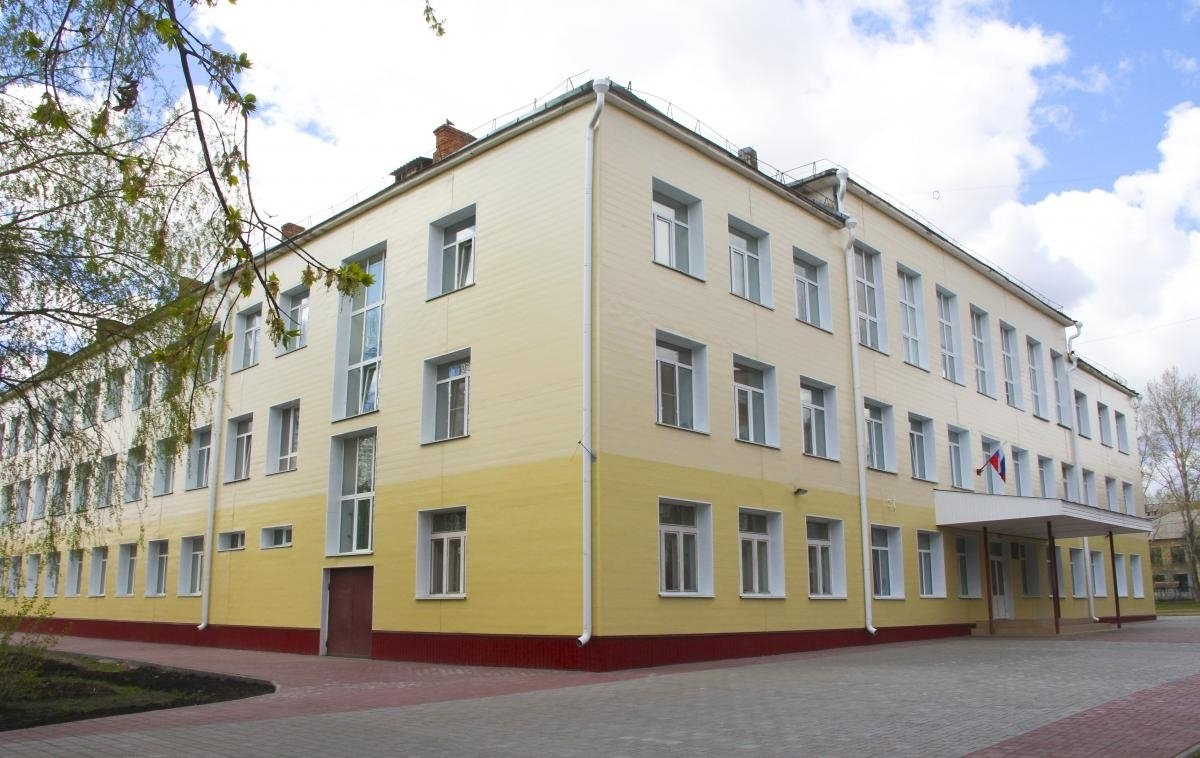
- Front view of the main building

Location
- Omsk, Andrianova str., 4 Russia
- 55°1′36″N 73°16′51″E

Information
- Type: free state school, namely: special status since 2015; gimnasium since 2007
- Motto: Learn to learn (Russian: Учись учиться)
- Established: 1962
- School district: Neftyaniki
- Superintendent: Omsk State University
- Headmaster: Svetlana Boykova
- Faculty: Irina Chernyavskaya, Vladimir Davydenko
- Grades: 1-11
- Enrollment: 834 (2015)
- Website: гимназия117.рф (in Russian)

Omsk Giftedness Development Center (or, officially, Multidisciplinary Educational Center for Giftedness Development, Russian: Многопрофильный образовательный центр развития одарённости) is a secondary education institution in Russia, specified in the training for science olympiads in different school subjects, such as mathematics and physics. It is placed in the Neftyaniki District of Omsk.

== History ==
The center was opened in 1962 as Omsk State School 117 (Russian: Средняя общеобразовательная школа № 117), a usual soviet secondary school. The school has the quarters on Andrianova str., 4, in the Neftyaniki District (which is, in practice, a satellite town of Omsk, built for Omsk Refinery).

In 2002, several specialists in the training for science olympiads left Lyceum 64, then a leading educational center of Omsk, and chose to work in the school 117. This gave an impulse for the development of the school: in 2004, an agreement about the cooperation with Omsk State University was made, and a new headmaster, Svetlana Boykova, was appointed; in 2007, the school received the status of gimnasium; in 2008, there were two winners of International Mathematical Olympiad, Nikita Kudyk and Konstantin Matveev.

In 2015, it obtained a special status in the educational system of Omsk Oblast, becoming a Multidisciplinary Educational Center for Giftedness Development. It meant that it now trains students from the whole region, accommodating a dormitory to include students from other cities.
