= Igra v biser pered svinyami =

Demo album AKA "Krasny al'bom (Akustika)" by Grazhdanskaya Oborona
- Released: 1986; 1996
- Recorded: 15-17 of august, 1986
- Venue: Laboratory inside an Omsk State University
- Genres: Folk-rock, Folk-punk
- Length: 31:30
- Language: Russian
- Labels: Studia Kolokol (Reel-to-reel Release); Hor (Cassette and CD)

Igra v biser pered svinyami (Russian: Игра в бисер перед свиньями, lit. 'Playing beads game in front of pigs') is an unofficial album by Grazhdanskaya Oborona. When album was recorded, Egor Letov didn't like the quality of recording and the album was declared as a bootleg. The album was recorded after the leader of a group, Egor Letov was released from mental asulym where he ended up due to problems with the KGB. Eventually, it became a demo for "Krasny al'bom" and became known as a "Krasny al'bom (Akustika)" until it was officially released on Cassette. In 2007, the album "Khorosho!!" was reissued with "Igra v biser" included as a bonus track.

== Background ==
After the conflict with the soviet officials on the end of 1985, Letov's partner, Ryabinov (Kuzya UO) was sent to army for 2 years and Letov was put into a mental asylum. After Letov got released he found out that his acquaintances had signed statements declaring that they would have no dealings with Letov, but the guy named Evgeny Filatov offered his assistance to help record the album that resulted the recordings made on 15-17 of august 1986, recorded inside a Laboratory of Omsk state university.

== Track listing ==
All tracks are written by Egor Letov except song №13 - E. "Jeff" Filatov and E. Letov.

No.	Title	Length
1.	"Igra v biser (Beads game)"	2:23
2.	"Na nashih glazah (On our eyes)"	2:09
3.	"Chuzherodnim elementom (Foreign element)"	2:58
4.	"Ya illuzoren (Im illusioned)"	3:27
5.	"Detskij mir (Child's world)"	1:56
6.	"Zoopark (Zoo)"	2:46
7.	"Tak daleko (Far away)"	1:50
8.	"BG (Boris Grebenshikov)"	2:16
9.	"Sredi zarazhennogo logikoj mira (in the midst of a world infected with logic)"	2:29
10.	"No skoro nastanet sovsem (But soon it will come completely)"	3:01
11.	"Nenavizhu krasnij svet (I hate the colour red)"	2:07
12.	"Mama, mama.."	2:41
13.	"Ubijtsya travi (Killer of the grass)"	1:07

== Credits ==
- E. Letov - Voice, Guitar, Bass guitar, Drums
- Evgeny Filatov - Harmonica and Bongs
- Kolya Mason - Back vocals (13)

Design:E. Letov and Konstantin "Kuzya UO" Ryabinov

Photo: V. Rozhkov and someone else(?)

Thanks to: Maxim Hasanov and Kyryll Peredeniy.
