= Nakhchamatyan =

The Nakhchamatyan (Note: Armenian: Նախճամատեանք, romanized: Naxčamateank) are an ethnonym recorded in the Armenian geographical work Ashkharatsuyts. The name occurs in the work's description of the peoples of Sarmatia, in a section derived in part from earlier geographical traditions. The ethnonym has been the subject of various linguistic and historical interpretations, however their identity and historical location remain uncertain.

Some scholars have connected the name with the ethnonym Nakhchi/Nokhchi, while others have proposed different interpretations of its components. The geographical information associated with the name has likewise been debated, particularly because of its relationship to the Iaxamatai mentioned in the geographical works of Ptolemy.

== History ==
=== Mentions ===
The Nakhchamatyane are mentioned in the list of peoples of Asian Sarmatia in the Ashkharatsuyts (Armenian Geography, 7th century). The work is based on the Geography of Claudius Ptolemy (1st–2nd century), with modifications to the section concerning the Caucasus added by an Armenian author whose identity has not been definitively established (variously identified as Movses Khorenatsi or Anania Shirakatsi). K. P. Patkanov suggested that the author may have borrowed his information on the Caucasus from Eastern sources, probably of an official nature.

Soviet academician and vice-president of the USSR Academy of Sciences N. Ya. Marr, in a 1922 work, stated that the ethnonym Nakhchamatyane "represents a counterpart to that found in Ptolemy." Within the framework of his "Japhetic theory" (now considered a pseudoscience), the researcher interpreted the sound ξ as a Hellenized rendering of the Japhetic complex ṭ — yaqsamat-ai. Today, the majority of Caucasiologists agree that, for some reason, the Armenian author of the Ashkharatsuyts replaced Ptolemy's Iaxamatai with the name Nakhchamatyane.

According to the Ashkharatsuyts, the Nakhchamatyane were located in the same area as Ptolemy's Iaxamatai — "to the west of (or at the mouth of) the Tanais [Don]...". Despite this, Yu. D. Desheriyev considers the habitat of the Nakhchamatyane according to the Ashkharatsuyts to correspond to the ancient settlement area of the Nakh peoples Yu. D. Desheriyev, relying on a map of Armenia compiled from the Ashkharatsuyts by S. T. Yeremyan, states that the Nakhchamatyane are located in the Ashkharatsuyts in the same area where the medieval Nakhs should be localized.

=== Comparison with Nokhchiy ===
In scholarly and popular-scientific literature, the explanation of the ethnonym Nakhchamatyane as being connected with the ethnonym of the ancestors of the Chechens has received broad recognition. The first such assumption was put forward by K. P. Patkanov in the second half of the 19th century, after which this hypothesis was reflected in the works of many other researchers, including those of the Soviet period (e.g. N. Ya. Marr in 1922, Yu. D. Desheriyev in 1963, S. T. Yeremyan in 1963, V. B. Vinogradov and K. Z. Chokayev in 1966), and was later repeated in the works of post-Soviet Caucasiologists (e.g. I. Yu. Aliroyev in 1999 (Note: The opinion that the name Noxçiy is connected with the ethnonym Nakhchamatyane, as well as the identification of the element -mat in the ethnonym with the Nakh word -mott, was expressed by I. Yu. Aliroyev in his 1990 work Language, History and Culture of the Vainakhs. He subsequently repeated this assertion in his 1999 work (The Chechen Language, republished in 2001), in his 1999 work (Chechens! Who Are They?, co-authored with M. M. Saidullayev, chairman of the State Council of the Chechen Republic), and in his 2002 work (History and Culture of the Vainakhs, co-authored with M. K. Osmaev, Minister of Culture of the Chechen Republic) (Aliroev I. Yu., 1990, p. 13; 2001 (1999), p. 8; Aliroev I. Yu., Saidullayev M. M., 1999, p. 7; Osmaev M. K., Aliroev I. Yu., 2003, p. 32).), G. Z. Anchabadze in 2001, M. M. Betilmerzaeva in 2005, A. D. Vagapov in 2008 and others).

==== Morphology and etymology within the hypothesis ====
In the commentary to his 1877 work, K. P. Patkanov proposed the following etymology of the ethnonym Nakhchamatyane (transliterated by K. P. Patkanov as nakhchamatyank): nakhcha- derives from the self-name of the Chechens (given by K. P. Patkanov as nakhche, meaning "people" (Note: The self-name of the modern Chechens is noxçiy (Chechen: нохчий), and the precise etymology of this ethnonym remains a matter of debate. K. P. Patkanov gives the presumed transliteration into Russian letters of the old name of the Chechens as nakhche, as well as its proposed derivation from the word nakh — "people", citing the work of Lieutenant General and member of the Saint Petersburg Academy of Sciences N. F. Dubrovin, who in turn used information from the works of Russian official and Caucasiologist A. P. Berge (see Noxçiy. Orthography) (Armenian Geography, 1877, p. 38, note 135; Dubrovin N. F., 1871, vol. I, book 1, pp. 367, 369; Berge A. P., 1857, p. 297).)); the component -mat- may have a meaning such as "lands" or "country", as in the names Sauromat and Sarmat and others; while the ending -yank, according to the researcher, is an Armenian ethnic suffix.

At the beginning of the Soviet period, N. Ya. Marr proposed a different interpretation of the ethnonym. He was unable to determine the first part of the word, nakhcha-, with certainty, considering that its identification with the word nakh — "people" — was formally hindered by the difference in the vowel a in the two words. He explained the second part of the medieval ethnonym, -mat-, in a manner completely different from K. P. Patkanov, deriving it from a Chechen word meaning "language" (Chechen: матт, Ingush: мотт) (Note: According to modern dictionaries, the Nakh word mott has several meanings: 1) tongue (anatomical); 2) language (speech); 3) bed; 4) tongue (the metal tip of a belt); 5) a bar on a wagon or cart used to connect the rear and front wheels (Chechen-Russian, Ingush-Russian and Bats-Russian Dictionaries, compiled by I. Yu. Aliroev, A. I. Bekova, A. D. Vagapov, Yu. D. Desheriyev, Z. D. Dzhamalkhanov, U. B. Dudarov, F. M. Ilieva, A. T. Ismailov, D. N. Kadagidze, N. D. Kadagidze, A. S. Kurkiev, L. D. Malsagova, A. G. Matsiev, I. A. Ozdoev, L. U. Tariyeva, L. T. Chrelashvili; see the "Bibliography" section for publication details).), which, in ethnic terminology, acquired the meaning "people", according to Marr. This view was considered convincing by I. A. Javakhishvili.

In a 1963 work, Chechen scholar and Doctor of Philology Yu. D. Desheriyev combined these interpretations, providing the most detailed analysis of the morphology and etymology of the ethnonym Nakhchamatyane (his transliteration: nakhchamateank). Like K. P. Patkanov, Desheriyev derives the first part of the word, nakhcha-, from the self-name of the Chechens; the second part of the ethnonym, -mat, he identifies, following N. Ya. Marr, with the common Nakh mott — "speech", "language" (Note: Yu. D. Desheriyev considers the element -mat- in the ethnonym particularly valuable for the history of the Nakh languages. According to the researcher, the original form of the stem of this word, with the root vowel [a], has survived in modern Nakh languages only in some oblique cases: Chechen: маттана (dative, singular), маттуо (ergative, singular). The alteration of the root vowel is attributed to an earlier vowel alternation in nominal stems: Mott || Muott < Matt. According to Desheriyev, "the form of this word recorded in the ancient Armenian source makes it possible to assume that the original vowel alternation of nominal stems developed at a later period" (Desheriyev Yu. D., 1963, p. 26).); while the ending of the ethnonym, -eank, according to the scholar, is a plural suffix of Classical Armenian. Thus, according to Desheriyev, this name of a people or tribe means "those who speak the Chechen language." Desheriyev also emphasizes that the first part of the ethnonym — "nakhchamat" — was formed by combining two stems, which is the oldest and most widespread method of word formation in the Nakh languages. In addition, the determining word generally precedes the word being determined, as in this case.

Many researchers (e.g. I. Yu. Aliroev; V. B. Vinogradov and K. Z. Chokayev) generally agree with Desheriyev. However, in their work Ancient Evidence for the Names and Settlement of the Nakh Tribes, Soviet scholars V. B. Vinogradov and K. Z. Chokayev amend his translation of the name Nakhchamatyane, considering "those who speak the language of the Nakhchoi [i.e. Noxçiy]" to be more accurate.

==== Criticism of the hypothesis ====
In 1973, in her work Ethnonyms and Tribal Names of the North Caucasus, N. G. Volkova expressed the view that the Nakhchamatyane may have been a later insertion into the Ashkharatsuyts (12th–13th centuries). According to Volkova, the ethnonym Noxçiy itself may have arisen no earlier than the 12th–13th centuries. She reached this conclusion based on the argument that the Chechen ethnonym is formed with the Turkic suffix -chi, which most likely could not have occurred before the 12th–13th centuries, a period of active penetration of Turkic-speaking elements into the North Caucasus (Cumans, Tatar-Mongols, and others) (Note: N. G. Volkova gives the interpretation of the ending of the name Noxçiy as the Turkic suffix -chi in her 1973 work Ethnonyms and Tribal Names of the North Caucasus. In the same work, however, she also proposed another possible origin of the ending of the word Noxçiy: from the Nakh ch'o — "place", "territory" (Volkova N. G., 1973, pp. 151, 176).). However, scholars have argued against the hypothesis of a Turkic origin for the suffix -chi, which was first proposed by Vinogradov and Chokayev; Chokayev later abandoned it himself. In one of his final discussions of the subject in a scholarly work, Chokayev also disagreed with Volkova's unjustified attempt to challenge the reliability of linguistic data in the analysis of ethnogenetic questions.
