= Totalitarizm =

Studio album by Grazhdanskaya Oborona
- Released: 1987 (Samizdat); 1996 (cassette); 1999 (CD); 2007 and 2015 (CD Reissues); 2024 (LP)
- Recorded: June 1987
- Studios: GrOb studio, Omsk
- Genres: Punk-rock, anarcho-punk
- Length: 33:00; 42:26 (reissue)
- Language: Russian
- Labels: GrOb records, Hor (1996, 1999); Misteria Zvuka (2007); Wyrgorod (2015, 2024)

Grazhdanskaya Oborona chronology
Khorosho!! (1987)	Totalitarizm (1987)	Nekrofiliya (1987)

Totalitarizm (Russian: Тоталитаризм, lit. 'Totalitarianism') is the sixth album of Grazhdanskaya Oborona. One of a series of albums from 1987 by Grazhdanskaya Oborona, along with "Myshelovka (Mousetrap)", "Khorosho!! (Good)", "Nekrofiliya (Necrophilia)" and "Krasnyy albom (Red album)". Like for every album from this series, Egor Letov plays alone on all instruments. The album "Totalitarizm" became the most extensive album in the series in terms of the number of songs, so part of the songs was released on other albums (Khorosho!! and Nekrofiliya).

== Background ==
In the song No.6 (Totalitarizm) Letov used a double guitar solo for the first time.
The prototype for the major general from the song No.1 (Mi - Lyod) was KGB agent Vladimir Vasilyevich Meshkov, who was in charge of the Egor Letov's case.
Song No.2 (Zapodlo) is an authobiography of the band.
Initially, Letov wanted to record song No.11 together with Yevgenii Lishenko (author of the song) but due to him being drunk, he rejected. Instead Letov recorded this song by himself after he got drunk drinking 10 liters of Omsk draft beer.

"Songs from 1986-87 (this time, seventy percent from 1987). A bunch of hits. I wrote and played all the parts, as before, alone. I insistently invited the late Zhenya Lishchenko, the pure and carefree author of the now classic "Hey, Brother Lyuber," to sing it himself, as a more appropriate and befitting performer of his own creation. However, he, being extremely inebriated, ill, and in a serious state, flatly refused, unfortunately, and shifted the responsibility to me. As a result, I performed the piece more or less adequately after drinking ten liters of Omsk draft beer with the infamous Danila Ershov."

— Egor Letov, September 1990, (Translated from Russian)

== Track listing ==
All tracks are written by Egor Letov except songs №4 and №11.

No.	Title	Length
1.	"Mi - lyod (We are ice)"	1:54
2.	"Zapodlo (Fucked over)"	1:58
3.	"Dzha na nashey storone (Jah is on our side)"	2:19
4.	"Kak zhit (How to live)" (Lyrics by - Yanka Dyagileva)	1:03
5.	"Est'! (Yes sir!)"	1:30
6.	"Totalitarizm (Totalitarianism)"	3:55
7.	"Vperyod (Forward)"	2:36
8.	"Optimism"	1:58
9.	"Da budet' Anarkhiya! (Let there be anarchy!)"	1:53
10.	"Zhrat' (Eat)"	2:08
11.	"Ej, brat lyuber! (Hey, brother lyuber!)" (Lyrics by - Yevgenii Lishenko)	3:39
12.	"Cheloveka ubilo avtobusom (A man was killed by the bus)"	0:12
13.	"Nasrat' na moye litso (Shit on my face)"	3:23
14.	"V pole rastyot molochay (milkweed grows in the field)"	0:09
15.	"S novim godom! (Happy new year!)"	2:36
16.	"Strana durakov (A country of fools)"	1:43

Song No.11 did not get released on reissue CD because of copyright issues.

Bonus tracks (reissue only)
No.	Title	Length
1.	"Razhdrazhenie (Irritation)"	3:43
2.	"Tramway"	0:51
3.	"Kogo-to eshyo (Someone else's)"	2:25
4.	"Psychodelicheskiy kameshek (Psychedelic stone)"	1:46
5.	"Upal (Fell down)"	0:10
6.	"Poshli vi vse na huy (Yall go fuck yourself)"	2:38
7.	"Mimikriya (Mimicry)"	1:35
