= 14th Secondary School of Vladivostok =

High school in Vladivostok, Russia

Coordinates: 43°06′43″N 131°56′36″E

- Vladivostok, Primorsky Krai; Russia

The 14th Secondary School of Vladivostok is a comprehensive school in Vladivostok, Russia.

The school is named after Evgeny Orlov, a Hero of the Russian Federation, a criminal fighter of the Wagner Group, who fought for Russian interests in the Syrian civil war, the War in Donbas, and in the 2022 Russian invasion of Ukraine, where he was killed in action in the summer of 2022.
