= Myshelovka =

Studio album by Grazhdanskaya Oborona
- Released: 1987
- Recorded: May 1987
- Studio: GrOb Studio
- Genre: Punk rock; noise rock; alternative rock; lo-fi
- Length: 31:36 (1987 original); 42:36 (2006 CD reissue)
- Label: GrOb; Hor Music (1996 CD/MC reissue); Misteriya Zvuka (2006 expanded CD reissue)
- Producer: Yegor Letov

Grazhdanskaya Oborona chronology
Optimizm (1985)	Myshelovka (1987)	Khorosho!! (1987)

Myshelovka (Russian: Мышеловка, Mousetrap) is the third album by Soviet/Russian punk band Grazhdanskaya Oborona. The album was released in 1987 and was recorded only by Yegor Letov in Omsk. It was the first album from the 1987 album series (with Khorosho!!, Totalitarizm, Nekrofiliya and Krasny albom).

== Background ==
Letov was released from the mental ward in March 1986 and immediately began to write and record music. In 1987 he played a set with his friends from Pik Klakson band Evgeny and Oleg Lischenko under the name Adolf Hitler. When Letov returned home, he found out the authorities were going to put him to a mental ward again. Then Letov took an attempt to record all his songs on tape for three months (from May to July).

He recorded the new album on his own, and while he credited other musicians, his collaborators went under pseudonyms as Letov, because the original members of GrOb were forced to sign sworn statements saying that they would stay away from Letov. Myshelovka was recorded with minimal technology in Letov's apartment or the apartments of friends, that his apartment came to be known as GrOb Studio, or GrOb Records. Music verged toward lo-fi, noisy punk rock, occasionally drawing inspiration from Russian reggae and folk tunes. Lyrical themes on the album include anti-communist and suicide moods.

== Track listing ==
All tracks are written by Yegor Letov.

No.	Title	Length
1.	"Tak zhe kak ranshe (Same As Before)"	0:15
2.	"On Uvidel Solntse (He Has Seen The Sun)"	3:40
3.	"Plastilin (Plasticine)"	2:31
4.	"Sledy Na Snegu (Traces In The Snow)"	2:21
5.	"Umeret' Molodym (Die Young)"	1:48
6.	"Dityo (Kid)"	2:47
7.	"Zholtaya Pressa (Yellow Press)"	2:19
8.	"Ivan Govnov"	1:52
9.	"Dezertir (Deserter)"	2:39
10.	"C.K. (Central Committee)"	2:05
11.	"Bred (Delirium)"	2:21
12.	"Mimikriya (Mimicry)"	1:37
13.	"Slepoye Bel'mo (Blind Eye)"	2:23
14.	"Poshli Vy Vse Na Khuy (Fuck You All)"	2:46
15.	"Myshelovka (Mousetrap)"	0:58

== Personnel ==
=== Grazhdanskaya Oborona ===
- Yegor Letov – vocals, guitars, bass guitar, drums, production

=== Technical ===
- Konstantin Ryabinov (Kuzya UO) – photography, album design, remastering
- Anna Volkova – photography
- Andrey Kudryavtsev – photography
- Yegor Letov – art design, album design, remastering
