= Mining in Georgia (country) =

Mining has been conducted in Georgia for centuries. Today, Georgia's mineral industry produces manganese, copper and various types of quarried stone. Although the Georgian economy has experienced significant economic growth in recent years, growth in the mining and metallurgical sector has lagged behind that of the overall economy.

== History ==
Metal mining in Georgia started with copper in the 6th-5th millennia B.C. Gold mining has also been conducted in Georgia since ancient times. One interpretation of the legend of the Golden Fleece supposedly held in ancient Georgia relates it to the local method of placer mining with sheep fleece to find gold. Pliny the Elder attributed the beginning of mining in western Georgia to King Saulaces of Colchis, who initiated gold and silver mining in Svaneti. Georgians in antiquity also produced iron, copper, brass, and bronze.

By the seventeenth century, silver mines remained a major source of wealth for Georgia, particularly in Imereti, while copper mining flourished in Kartli in the early eighteenth century.

During the Soviet period, a range of minerals were mined in Georgia, which included arsenic, barite, bentonite, coal, copper, diatomite, lead, manganese, zeolite, and zinc, among others. Most of these commodities were still being produced in 2005, although in lesser quantities. The country had been a major producer of high-grade manganese ore for about a century, although ore reserves were being depleted. Part of the manganese was used within Georgia for ferroalloy production. Following the dissolution of the Soviet Union, the level of mineral production in Georgia declined sharply. Although production in the mineral industry was reviving in 2005, Georgia did not produce any mineral products in quantities that would be of more than regional significance.

Georgia's main role in the world mineral supply was to serve as a transport route for oil and gas shipments out of the Caspian region to world markets. Three of the new large oil and gas export pipelines that had been or were being constructed in the Caspian region pass through Georgia. These three are the Baku-Tbilisi-Ceyhan, the Baku-Tbilisi-Erzurum, and the Baku-Supsa (“Western Early Oil Route”) pipelines. No routes were planned to cross Armenia owing to Azerbaijan's troubled relationship with the country.

== Mineral resources ==
Georgia has more than 300 explored mineral deposits, only about half of which have been brought into production. For the past 100 years, the manganese ore deposits near the town of Chiatura have represented a significant source of manganese ore production. Chiatura ores supplied the county's Zestaponi ferroalloys plant.

The Chiatura deposit's resources were estimated to be 215 Mt of manganese ore, of which about half has been depleted. The country has 11 explored oilfields with reportedly 28 Mt of oil resources; larger oilfields are also thought to exist.

Georgia reportedly has more than 400 Mt of coal resources.

The Black Sea coast in Adjara is thought to contain large gas fields with 8.5 billion cubic meters of resources already explored, and potential resources estimated to be 125 billion cubic meters.

The country also has resources of arsenic, barite, copper, diatomite, dimension stone, marble, and lead-zinc, as well as raw materials for producing cement. Important deposits include the Askana bentonite clay deposit in Ozurgeti, the Kisatibi diatomite deposit in the Akhaltsikhe District, the Kvaisa zinc deposit in the Java district, the Lukhumi arsenic deposit in the Ambrolauri district, and the Madneuli polymetallic (barite, copper, lead-zinc, pyrite, silver, sulfur, gold bearing quartzites) deposits in the Bolnisi region.

== Industry structure ==
In 2005, Georgia had 148 enterprises that were involved in mining and quarrying out of a total of 4,632 industrial enterprises, which comprised 3.2% of the total number of industrial enterprises. Seven of these 148 enterprises were state owned and the rest were private. In 2005, the labor force involved in mining and quarrying totaled 8,600 out of a total industrial labor force of 94,300, or 8.6% of the industrial labor force. State-owned mining and quarrying enterprises employed 5,700 people and private enterprises employed 2,900 people. Mining and quarrying contributed 10.4% of the total value of industrial production in 2005.

Of the total value of output for mining and quarrying, state-owned enterprises produced about one-third of the value of output, and the remaining two-thirds was produced by privately owned enterprises. Of the total value of industrial capital stock, mining and quarrying enterprises accounted for 3.4% of the value.

== Trade ==
Georgia exported a large percentage of its major mineral products. These products included copper ores and concentrates, ferroalloys produced from domestically produced manganese ore, and nitrogenous fertilizers. The country also exported significant quantities of ferrous scrap and waste. Georgia's major mineral imports were oil and gas.

== Outlook ==
Georgia's major revenues from minerals are expected to derive from its role as a transport route for the Caspian Sea hydrocarbons. Oilfield and gasfield development could take place off the Black Sea shelf as a number of major international companies are assessing the region's production potential. Only two mining enterprises are operating in Georgia — the Chiatura manganese enterprise and the Madneueli polymetallic mining enterprise. Both had previously lacked investment resources to introduce modern technology that would enable them to produce near their potential. In 2005, however, a joint venture of Austrian, Georgian, and Russian bidders reportedly won the privatization tender for the manganese mining enterprise for $132 million, and Stanton Equities Corporation reportedly won a privatization bid for a gold mine at Madneuli.

The Mineral Industry of Georgia
