= Dubrovin =

Dubrovin (masculine, Russian: Дубровин) or Dubrovina (feminine, Russian: Дубровина) is a Russian surname. Notable people with the surname include:

- Alexander Dubrovin (1855–?), Russian politician
- Boris Dubrovin (mathematician) (1950–2019), Russian mathematician
- Boris Dubrovin (poet) (1926–2020), Soviet and Russian author, poet, and songwriter
- Elizaveta Dubrovina (born 1993), Russian acrobatic gymnast
- Evgeny Dubrovin (born 1986), Russian ice hockey player
- Konstantin Dubrovin (born 1977), Ukrainian freestyle swimmer
- Stanislav Dubrovin (born 1974), Russian–Uzbek soccer coach and former player
- Sergei Dubrovin (born 1982), Russian soccer coach and former player
- Serghei Dubrovin (born 1952), Moldovan soccer manager and former player
- Yuri Dubrovin (born 1984), Russian soccer player

== See also ==
- Dubrovin Farm in Israel
