= Natalya Starovoyt =

Russian stage actress

Natalya Vitalyevna Starovoyt (Russian: Наталья Витальевна Старовойт) (born 17 February 1962 in Omsk, Russia) is a Russian stage actress.

After graduating from Sverdlovsk Theater School in 1984, Starovoyt worked in theaters in Ryazan and Syzran. Since 1988 she has performed with Penza Region Drama Theatre.

== Awards ==
- 2001: Penza Region Governor's Prize
- 2004: Merited Artist of the Russian Federation
- 2011: Certificate of honor of the Legislative Assembly of Penza Region
