= Maxim Kazakov =

Russian ice hockey player

- Born: March 27, 1993 (age 33) Omsk, Russia
- Height: 5 ft 9 in (175 cm)
- Weight: 163 lb (74 kg; 11 st 9 lb)
- Position: Forward
- Shoots: Right
- VHL team Former teams: Omskie Krylia; Avangard Omsk; Metallurg Novokuznetsk; Admiral Vladivostok; Sibir Novosibirsk; Humo Tashkent; HC Tambov; HC Vityaz; Neftyanik Almetievsk; Toros Neftekamsk; Omskie Krylia; AKM Tula; HC Yugra
- NHL draft: Undrafted
- Playing career: 2013–present

Maxim Dmitrievich Kazakov (Russian: Макси́м Дми́триевич Казако́в; born March 27, 1993) is a Russian professional ice hockey player who plays with Omskie Krylia of the All-Russian Hockey League (VHL).

Kazakov made his Kontinental Hockey League debut playing with Avangard Omsk during the 2013–14 KHL season.
