= Alexander Sazonov =

Russian ice hockey player

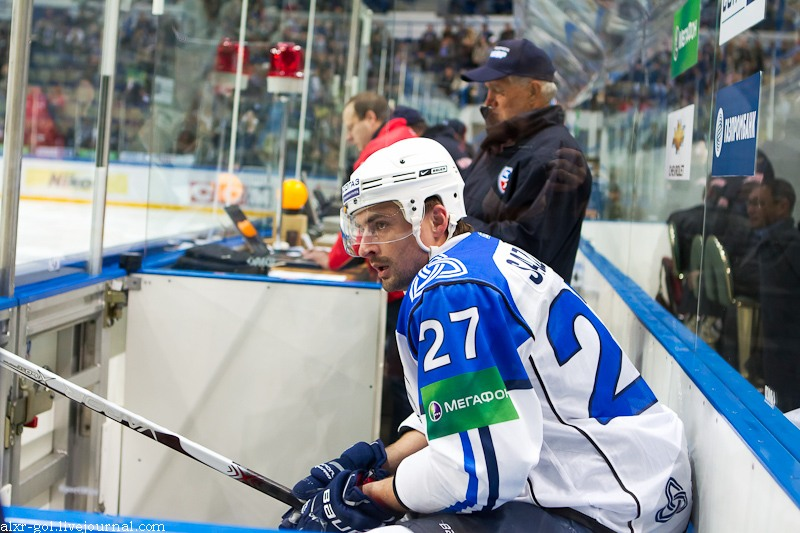
- Born: November 29, 1980 (age 45) Omsk, Russian SFSR
- Height: 6 ft 1 in (185 cm)
- Weight: 192 lb (87 kg; 13 st 10 lb)
- Position: Defence
- Shoots: Left
- KHL team Former teams: Vityaz Chekhov; Traktor Chelyabinsk; Neftekhimik Nizhnekamsk
- Playing career: 1999–present

Alexander Gennadyevich Sazonov is a Russian professional ice hockey defenceman who currently plays for and is captain of Vityaz Chekhov in the Kontinental Hockey League.
