= Viktor Imrekov =

Russian footballer

Personal information
- Full name: Viktor Olegovich Imrekov
- Date of birth: 14 December 1985 (age 40)
- Place of birth: Omsk, Russian SFSR
- Height: 1.76 m (5 ft 9 1/2 in)
- Position: Midfielder

Senior career*
Years	Team	Apps	(Gls)
2005	FC Dynamo Moscow	0	(0)
2006	FC Dynamo Makhachkala	25	(0)
2007	FC KAMAZ Naberezhnye Chelny	1	(0)
2007	FC Zvezda Irkutsk	11	(1)
2008	FC Vityaz Podolsk	26	(0)
2009	FC Volochanin-Ratmir Vyshny Volochyok	34	(5)
2010	FC Pskov-747	27	(6)
2011	FC Zvezda Ryazan	22	(2)
2012	FC Mashuk-KMV Pyatigorsk	8	(0)
2013	FC Metallurg Vyksa	20	(2)
2014	FC Podolye Podolsky district	18	(1)

Managerial career
- 2017: FC Ararat-2 Moscow (administrator)
- * Club domestic league appearances and goals

Viktor Olegovich Imrekov (Russian: Виктор Олегович Имреков; born 14 December 1985) is a former Russian professional football player.

== Club career ==
He made his Russian Football National League debut for FC Dynamo Makhachkala on 8 May 2006 in a game against FC Ural Yekaterinburg.

== Personal life ==
His twin brother Arkadi Imrekov and father Oleg Imrekov are also professional footballers.
