= Ludmilla Radchenko =

Russian fashion designer (born 1978)

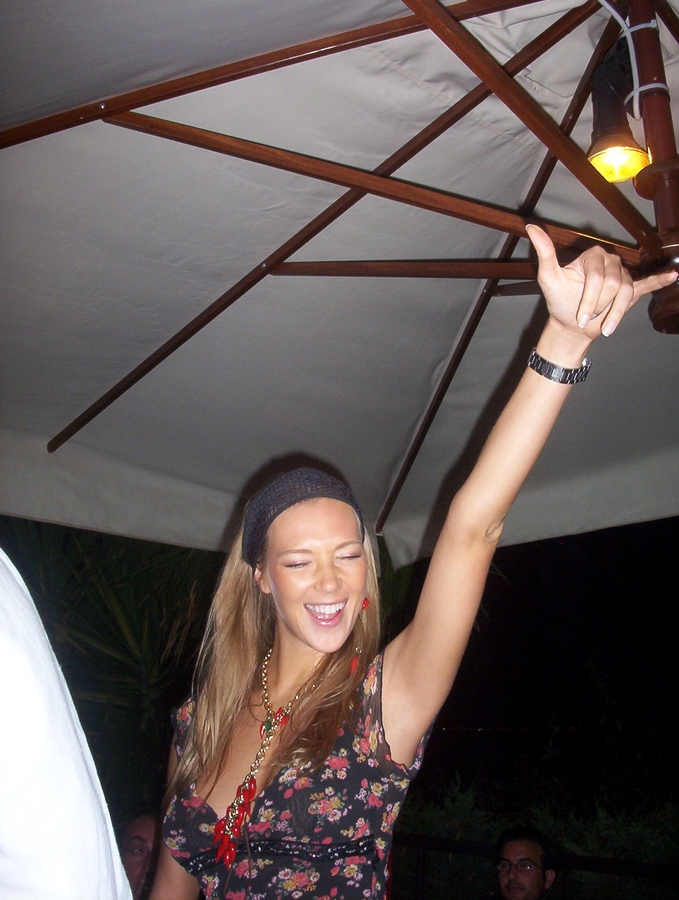
- Born: Ludmila Vladimirovna Radchenko; November 11, 1978 (age 47); Omsk, Soviet Union
- Occupations: Model, actress, TV presenter
- Height: 1.74 m (5 ft 9 in)

Ludmilla Vladimirovna Radchenko (Russian: Людмила Владимировна Радченко, born November 11, 1978, in Omsk, Soviet Union) is a Russian painter, model, artist and actress.

== Biography ==
Born in Omsk, Ludmilla graduated in fashion design in 1999. In 1997 After her arrival in Italy, she began her career with an Italian spot during the television program Paperissima. Chosen by Fapim, a windows manufacturer, for their 2008 calendar, she posed in erotic photographs for Luca Cattoretti. As an actress, she starred in the TV movie Il viaggio (2005) and in two episodes of the TV series RIS – Delitti imperfetti, in addition to some small roles in other Italian productions. In 2008 she starred in the film A Light Of Passion.

After La Talpa, she began painting and had exhibitions in Milan and decided to devote herself to art. After a long study trip to New York City, a series of collections were displayed in various galleries, art events and exhibitions.

In February 2011, the province of Milan supported Radchenko's exhibition at the House of World Cultures. In May 2011 a New York gallery presented her at the Eating Art festival, and her works were exhibited at the Crown Fine Art gallery in Soho.

== Television ==
- La sai l'ultima? (2001)
- Passaparola (2001–2002)
- Spicy Tg (2003)
- La talpa (2005)
- On the Road (2006)
- Tuning and Fanatics (2007)
- Reality Game (2007)
- Modeland (2008)

== Filmography ==
| Year | Title | Role | Notes |
|---|---|---|---|
| 2005 | Il viaggio | | |
| 2006 | R.I.S. Delitti imperfetti | | 2 episodes |
| 2006 | A Light of Passion | | |
| 2008 | Scaccomatto | | Short |
| 2009 | L'ispettore Coliandro: Sesso e segreti | | Film TV |
| 2009 | Un posto al sole d'estate | Natasha | soap opera |
| 2010 | Ganja Fiction | Luna | Movie |

== Fashion agencies ==
- Urban Management
- Gwen Management

== Bibliography ==
- Pop Art, Edizioni Skira-Feltrinelli (2010) ISBN 9788857208923
