= JSC RMG Copper =

- Type: Joint-stock company
- Industry: Mining
- Founded: 1975
- Headquarters: Tbilisi, Georgia
- Products: Copper; Gold
- Revenue: US$70.70 Million estimated maximum
- Website: www.richmetalsgroup.com

JSC RMG Copper (JSCM) (Georgian: სააქციო საზოგადოება არ ემ ჯი კოპერი, saak'ts'io sazogadoeba "RMG Copper", formerly JSC Madneuli) is a mining company based in Tbilisi, Georgia. Established in 1975, RMG Copper is currently involved in ore, copper, and gold mining and smelting.

== Ownership ==
In 2005, the Russian GeoProMining purchased the state-owned Madneuli. This was one of the first public privatisations in Georgia. The company was purchased by Stanton Equity, which at that time was part of the Industrial Investors Holding. In 2007 Siman Povarenkin, who at that time was a co-owner of Industrial Investors, purchased 100% of Stanton Equity and renamed it GeoProMining.

Later in 2005 GPM purchased another Georgian asset, Quartzite (today known as RMG Gold), a producer of gold.

On June 14, 2012, Rich Metals Group acquired 100% ownership of JSC RMG Copper for US$120 Million.

Under the new ownership, the company formerly known as JSC Madneuli changed its name to JSC RMG Copper.

The mine was opened in 1975 in Bolnisi region, Georgia. RMG Copper has the open pit Bolnisi Mine in the Bolnisi district of the Kvemo Kartli region in southern Georgia. The mine reached full capacity in 1978. Western sources estimate RMG Copper's assets in this mine to be 350,435 oz (10,908 kg) of gold. Silver, copper, and other minerals are also mined at that location. This asset has been worked for 30 years.

In 2021, JSC RMG Copper ranked as the 22nd biggest company in Georgia by revenue in a list by Forbes. It was the highest mining company on the list.

=== CSR ===
RMG Copper invested to 1 million GEL in Corporate Social Responsibility activities in 2010. Its projects include sport and cultural events, charity, etc. Fund Iavnana is one of the key projects
