= Evgeny Orlov =

Russian ice hockey player

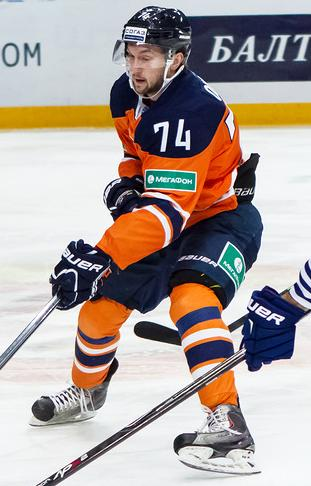
- Born: October 24, 1990 (age 35) Omsk, Russian SFSR
- Height: 5 ft 11 in (180 cm)
- Weight: 179 lb (81 kg; 12 st 11 lb)
- Position: Forward
- Shoots: Left
- KHL team Former teams: Yugra; Avangard Omsk; Amur Khabarovsk; Metallurg Novokuznetsk
- Playing career: 2009–present

Evgeny Alexandrovich Orlov (born October 24, 1990) is a Russian professional ice hockey forward who currently plays for HC Yugra of the Kontinental Hockey League. A school is named after him the 14th Secondary School of Vladivostok
