= Siman Povarenkin =

Russian mining entrepreneur

Siman Victorovich Povarenkin
- Born: December 19, 1969 (age 56); Omsk, Russia
- Education: Omsk State University
- Occupation: Entrepreneur
- Known for: Owner of GeoProMining
- Spouse: Irina Povarenkina
- Children: 2
- Website: www.geopromining.com

Siman Povarenkin (Russian: Симан Викторович Поварёнкин, romanized: Siman Viktorovich Povaryonkin; born 1969 in Omsk, Russia) is a Russian entrepreneur with investments in metals & mining, geophysics and medical and health technology in Asia, Europe and Latin America.

== Early life and education ==
Povarenkin graduated from the Omsk State University with a degree in Chemistry and Petroleum Chemicals. In addition, he has completed courses in finance and banking at the Academy of Economics in Moscow, Bank Tutors Institute in Frankfurt, and the Intellectual Fund in Paris.

== Career ==
He was chairman of the Board of Industrial Investors Group, FESCO, Russian Industrial Bank and First Vice President, Head of Investment Management Business at Incombank. He served as director of Far Eastern Shipping Company Plc from June 5, 2007, to December 2008. He serves as Non-Executive Director of Saddleback Corporation Ltd.

=== GeoProMining ===
One of Povarenkin's investments was in GeoProMining (GPM), an international gold and copper mining company with operations in Russia and Armenia. He has previously served as chairman of the Board of GPM, and is currently a member of Board of Directors and the Remuneration Committee.

In 2005, along with business partner at the time Sergey Generalov, he purchased one of the largest mining companies in Georgia, consisting of the Madneuli mine and its subsidiary Quartzite. This was to become the first production asset of GeoProMining. In 2007, the two divided up the assets of their shared investment vehicle Industrial Investors, with Povarenkin becoming the majority shareholder of GeoProMining. He subsequently expanded GPM further, acquiring various mining assets in the Caucasus region. In 2012 the firm sold its assets in Georgia.

=== GPM Asia ===
Another mining project of Povarenkin was GPM Asia. GPM Asia is not a part of GeoProMining Group. In 2009 GPM Asia acquired mining and processing operations located in Binh Thuan province in the south-east of Vietnam. Key products are mineral sands - zircon and titanium dioxide minerals in the form of ilmenite, rutile and monazite. Mineral sands produced by GPM Asia are certified by SGS. The company is looking into expanding its operations in the region.

== Personal life ==
Povarenkin is married to Irina Povarenkina who was born in 1978 and they have two children who moved with their mother to London in 2013.

In 2009, Povarenkins purchased the 19th-century chateau in Normandy (France), which was previously owned by Yves Saint Laurent.
