= Arkadi Imrekov =

Russian footballer and manager

Personal information
- Full name: Arkadi Olegovich Imrekov
- Date of birth: 14 December 1985 (age 40)
- Place of birth: Omsk, Russian SFSR
- Height: 1.76 m (5 ft 9 1/2 in)
- Position: Midfielder

Youth career
- FC Stahl Linz
- Krasny Oktyabr Moscow

Senior career*
Years	Team	Apps	(Gls)
2005	FC Dynamo Moscow	0	(0)
2006	FC Dynamo Makhachkala	31	(4)
2007	FC KAMAZ Naberezhnye Chelny	19	(1)
2008	FC Vityaz Podolsk	26	(1)
2009	FC Volochanin-Ratmir Vyshny Volochyok	30	(2)
2010	FC Pskov-747 Pskov	31	(5)
2011	FC Zvezda Ryazan	26	(0)
2012	FC Mashuk-KMV Pyatigorsk	7	(1)
2012–2013	FC Gubkin	29	(3)
2013–2014	FC Metallurg Vyksa	32	(1)

Managerial career
- 2017: FC Dynamo Bryansk (assistant)
- 2017: FC Ararat Moscow
- 2017–2018: FC Ararat Moscow (assistant)
- * Club domestic league appearances and goals

Arkadi Olegovich Imrekov (Russian: Аркадий Олегович Имреков; born 14 December 1985) is a Russian professional football manager and a former player.

== Club career ==
He made his Russian Football National League debut for FC Dynamo Makhachkala on 29 March 2006 in a game against FC Angusht Nazran.

== Personal life ==
His twin brother Viktor Imrekov and father Oleg Imrekov are also professional footballers. Children - Anisiya Imrekova, Alisa Imrekova, Arseniy Imrekov.
