= Semyon Zherebtsov =

Russian ice hockey player

- Born: November 23, 1992 (age 32); Omsk, Russia
- Height: 6 ft 2 in (188 cm)
- Weight: 170 lb (77 kg; 12 st 2 lb)
- Position: Forward
- Shoots: Left
- KHL team: Avangard Omsk
- NHL draft: Undrafted
- Playing career: 2012–present

Semyon Zherebtsov (born November 23, 1992) is a Russian professional ice hockey player. He is currently playing with Avangard Omsk of the Kontinental Hockey League (KHL).

Zherebtsov made his Kontinental Hockey League debut playing with Avangard Omsk during the 2012–13 KHL season.
