= Sergei Osipov (footballer, born 1968) =

Russian footballer and coach

Personal information
- Full name: Sergei Vladimirovich Osipov
- Date of birth: 4 March 1968 (age 58)
- Place of birth: Omsk, Russian SFSR
- Height: 1.81 m (5 ft 11 1/2 in)
- Position: Defender

Senior career*
Years	Team	Apps	(Gls)
1985–1986	FC Irtysh Omsk	37	(0)
1987–1988	FC SKA Novosibirsk		
1989–1991	FC Irtysh Omsk	88	(3)
1992	FC Uralmash Yekaterinburg	0	(0)
1992	FC Uralets Nizhny Tagil	1	(0)
1992	FC Rubin-TAN Kazan	25	(1)
1993–1994	FC Baltika Kaliningrad	43	(2)
1994–1998	FC Irtysh Omsk	158	(11)
1999–2003	FC Lokomotiv Chita	172	(3)

Managerial career
- 2007–2008: FC Chita
- 2009: FC Sakhalin Yuzhno-Sakhalinsk
- * Club domestic league appearances and goals

Sergei Vladimirovich Osipov (Russian: Серге́й Владимирович Осипов; born 4 March 1968) is a Russian professional football coach and a former player.

== Playing career ==
He played 11 seasons in the Russian Football National League for Rubin-TAN, FC Baltika Kaliningrad, FC Irtysh Omsk and FC Lokomotiv Chita.
