= Evgeny Dubrovin =

Russian ice hockey player

- Born: January 27, 1986 (age 39); Omsk, Russian SFSR, Soviet Union
- Height: 5 ft 11 in (180 cm)
- Weight: 201 lb (91 kg; 14 st 5 lb)
- Position: Defence
- Shoots: Left
- VHL team Former teams: HC Ryazan; Avangard Omsk; HC Sibir Novosibirsk; Avtomobilist Yekaterinburg
- Playing career: 2004–present

Evgeny Dubrovin (born January 27, 1986) is a Russian professional ice hockey defenceman who currently plays for HC Ryazan of the Supreme Hockey League (VHL).

Dubrovin previously played in the Russian Superleague for Avangard Omsk and in its successor Kontinental Hockey League for HC Sibir Novosibirsk and Avtomobilist Yekaterinburg.
