= Oleg Imrekov =

Russian footballer (1962–2014)

Personal information
- Full name: Oleg Yevgenyevich Imrekov
- Date of birth: 10 July 1962
- Place of birth: Omsk, Russian SFSR
- Date of death: 26 January 2014 (aged 51)
- Place of death: Moscow, Russia
- Height: 1.76 m (5 ft 9 1/2 in)
- Position: Midfielder

Senior career*
Years	Team	Apps	(Gls)
1981–1982	FC Fakel Tyumen	41	(2)
1983–1984	FC Irtysh Omsk	27	(2)
1984	PFC CSKA Moscow	10	(1)
1985	FC Irtysh Omsk	26	(10)
1986–1987	FC Rotor Volgograd	86	(12)
1988–1990	FC Chornomorets Odesa	63	(9)
1990–1991	FC Spartak Moscow	6	(0)
1991–1993	FC Stahl Linz	45	(4)
1993–1994	LASK Linz		
1996	FC Chernomorets Novorossiysk	2	(0)
- * Club domestic league appearances and goals

Oleg Yevgenyevich Imrekov (Russian: Олег Евгеньевич Имреков; 10 July 1962 – 26 January 2014) was a Russian professional footballer.

His twin sons Arkadi Imrekov and Viktor Imrekov are professional footballers.

== Honours ==
- Soviet Top League runner-up: 1991.
- USSR Federation Cup winner: 1990.
