= Omsk State University =

University in Russia

Dostoevsky Omsk State University
- Омский государственный университет им. Ф. М. Достоевского
- Established: 1974
- Rector: Sergey Vladimirovich Zamyatin (Acting from 7.12.2021)
- Academic staff: 1000
- Students: 5740 (345 international students)
- Location: Omsk, Omsk Oblast, Russia; 54.9925°N 73.3578°E Building details
- Language: Russian, English
- Website: omsu.ru/eng/ (in English)

University rankings

Regional – Overall
- QS Emerging Europe and Central Asia: 251-300 (2022)

Dostoevsky Omsk State University (Омский государственный университет им. Ф. М. Достоевского), usually referred to as Omsk State University (Омский государственный университет) (OmSU) was founded in 1974 in the city of Omsk, Russia. The two original departments (Humanities and Science) and 40 professors have grown to 13 departments and a 1000-member faculty. The university has graduated more than 25,000 students. OmSU embraces its connections to the world and develops international relations with the universities of Europe, the United States, Mexico, Japan, China, Kazakhstan and other countries. Such cooperation led to the establishment of the Centers for Chinese, Kazakh and Ibero-American Studies which in its turn flows into the development of study and research abroad programs that provide the opportunity to conduct independent projects in a foreign country.

== Faculties ==
The university has 12 faculties and two institutes:

- Faculty of Computer Science
- Faculty of Economics
- Faculty of Law
- Faculty of Culture and Arts
- Faculty of Psychology
- Faculty of Chemistry
- Faculty of Physics
- Faculty of History, Theology and International relations
- Faculty of Foreign Languages
- Faculty of Physical Education, Rehabilitation and Sport
- Faculty of Philology and Media Communications
- Institute of Mathematics and Information Technology
- Institute of Secondary Vocational Education and Pre-University Training

As well as 6 training centers:

- Faculty of advanced training
- Center for Business Education
- Preparatory department for foreign citizens
- Center for pre-university training and career guidance
- Center for Advanced Studies "Secret-Inform"
- Institute of Continuing and Open Education

== Accommodation ==
The university has eleven main buildings. The library maintains subscriptions to many subject-specific periodicals as well as to daily and weekly newspapers both from Russia and from abroad.

== Studies ==
The university operates degree programs not only in law, humanities and natural sciences but also in theology, culture and arts, including:

- 53 undergraduate degree courses
- 31 master programs
- 15 postgraduate programs
- 8 PhD programs

In 2013, the Interuniversity Innovation Business Incubator was created to offer aspiring scientists research opportunities. Most courses are taught in Russian, but some courses can be taught in English, German, French and Spanish if requested.

Students can join sporting clubs, such as football and hockey. They also have access to a swimming pool, on-site and off-site recreation centres, athletic fields and fitness studios. The university is also a part of the Erasmus+ programme, offering students the opportunity to study abroad as part of their studies.

The university publishes s newspapers. The Publishing Department and the Scientific-Educational Fund (NOF) both publish research and literature.

== University publications ==
- Herald of Omsk University (Вестник ОмГУ) - journal
- Historical Yearbook (Исторический ежегодник) - journal
- Omsk University (Омский университет) - newspaper
- Wellspring (Источник) – a publication for Orthodox students
- Eagle-owl (Филин) – a publication of the Department of Philology
- Pilgrim (Пилигрим) – literary journal

== Notable alumni and faculty ==
- Sergey Baburin (born 1959) - former Dean of Law
- Herman Gref (born 1964) - Minister of Economic Development and Trade, CEO of Sberbank
- Siman Povarenkin (born 1969) - businessman and owner of GeoProMining
- Davaajantsangiin Sarangerel (born 1963) - Mongolian journalist and politician
