= 2019–20 UEFA Europa League qualifying (preliminary to second round matches) =

European football competition

This page summarises the matches of the preliminary, first and second qualifying rounds of 2019–20 UEFA Europa League qualifying.

Times are CEST (UTC+2), as listed by UEFA (local times, if different, are in parentheses).

== Preliminary round ==
=== Summary ===
The first legs were played on 27 June, and the second legs on 2 and 4 July 2019.

Team 1	Agg.	Team 2	1st leg	2nd leg
Progrès Niederkorn (Luxembourg)	2–2 (a)	(Wales) Cardiff Metropolitan University	1–0	1–2
La Fiorita (San Marino)	1–3	(Andorra) Engordany	0–1	1–2
Sant Julià (Andorra)	3–6	(Gibraltar) Europa	3–2	0–4
Ballymena United (Northern Ireland)	2–0	(Faroe Islands) NSÍ	2–0	0–0
Prishtina (Kosovo)	1–3	(Gibraltar) St Joseph's	1–1	0–2
KÍ (Faroe Islands)	9–1 (Note: Order of legs reversed after original draw.)	(San Marino) Tre Fiori	5–1	4–0
Barry Town United (Wales)	0–4	(Northern Ireland) Cliftonville	0–0	0–4

=== Matches ===
27 June 2019
19:30

Progrès Niederkorn (Luxembourg)	1–0	(Wales) Cardiff Metropolitan University
De Almeida 62'	Report

Stade Municipal, Differdange (Note: Progrès Niederkorn played their home matches at Stade Municipal, Differdange and Stade Josy Barthel, Luxembourg City, instead of their regular stadium Stade Jos Haupert, Niederkorn which did not meet UEFA requirements.)
Attendance: 1,984
Referee: Luís Teixeira (Portugal)
4 July 2019
19:30 (18:30 UTC+1)

Cardiff Metropolitan University (Wales)	2–1	(Luxembourg) Progrès Niederkorn
Lam 2'; Rees 67' (pen.)	Report	De Almeida 73'

Cardiff International Sports Stadium, Cardiff (Note: Cardiff Metropolitan University played their home match at Cardiff International Sports Stadium, Cardiff, instead of their regular stadium Cyncoed Campus, Cardiff which did not meet UEFA requirements.)
Attendance: 1,316
Referee: Loukas Sotiriou (Cyprus)

2–2 on aggregate; Progrès Niederkorn won on away goals.

27 June 2019
20:45

La Fiorita (San Marino)	0–1	(Andorra) Engordany
	Report	Sánchez 31'

San Marino Stadium, Serravalle
Attendance: 302
Referee: Christophe Pires (Luxembourg)
4 July 2019
19:30

Engordany (Andorra)	2–1	(San Marino) La Fiorita
Zugić 17'; Gasperoni 84' (o.g.)	Report	Coca 78' (o.g.)

Estadi Comunal, Andorra la Vella
Attendance: 428
Referee: Alexandru Tean (Moldova)

Engordany won 3–1 on aggregate.

27 June 2019
20:00

Sant Julià (Andorra)	3–2	(Gibraltar) Europa
Méndez 44', 64'; Muñoz 90+3'	Report	Gallardo 4'; Mango 46' (o.g.)

Estadi Comunal, Andorra la Vella
Attendance: 300
Referee: Dragan Petrović (Bosnia and Herzegovina)
4 July 2019
20:30

Europa (Gibraltar)	4–0	(Andorra) Sant Julià
Gallardo 38'; De Barr 48'; Walker 78'; Juampe 90+2'	Report

Victoria Stadium, Gibraltar
Attendance: 1,075
Referee: Matthew De Gabriele (Malta)

Europa won 6–3 on aggregate.

27 June 2019
20:45 (19:45 UTC+1)

Ballymena United (Northern Ireland)	2–0	(Faroe Islands) NSÍ
Millar 49'; Winchester 55'	Report

Ballymena Showgrounds, Ballymena
Attendance: 2,270
Referee: Athanasios Tzilos (Greece)
4 July 2019
20:00 (19:00 UTC+1)

NSÍ (Faroe Islands)	0–0	(Northern Ireland) Ballymena United
	Report

Svangaskarð, Toftir (Note: NSÍ Runavík played their home match at Svangaskarð, Toftir, instead of their regular stadium Við Løkin, Runavík which did not meet UEFA requirements.)
Attendance: 553
Referee: Besfort Kasumi (Kosovo)

Ballymena United won 2–0 on aggregate.

27 June 2019
20:45

Prishtina (Kosovo)	1–1	(Gibraltar) St Joseph's
Dallku 28' (pen.)	Report	Juanfri 31'

Fadil Vokrri Stadium, Pristina
Attendance: 4,100
Referee: Helgi Mikael Jónasson (Iceland)
2 July 2019
17:45

St Joseph's (Gibraltar)	2–0	(Kosovo) Prishtina
Villar 75'; Juanfri 80'	Report

Victoria Stadium, Gibraltar
Attendance: 500
Referee: Luca Barbeno (San Marino)

St Joseph's won 3–1 on aggregate.

27 June 2019
20:00 (19:00 UTC+1)

KÍ (Faroe Islands)	5–1	(San Marino) Tre Fiori
P. Johannesen 9'; Sandmæl 37'; J. Johannesen 56'; Bjartalíð 73', 83'	Report	A. Compagno 90+3'

Gundadalur, Tórshavn (Note: KÍ Klaksvík played their home matches at Gundadalur, Tórshavn, instead of their regular stadium Við Djúpumýrar, Klaksvík which did not meet UEFA requirements.)
Attendance: 575
Referee: Robert Jenkins (Wales)
4 July 2019
20:45

Tre Fiori (San Marino)	0–4	(Faroe Islands) KÍ
	Report	Bjartalíð 29' (pen.); J. Johannesen 33'; P. Johannesen 45+2'; J. Danielsen 75'

San Marino Stadium, Serravalle
Attendance: 177
Referee: Novak Simović (Serbia)

KÍ won 9–1 on aggregate.

27 June 2019
19:30 (18:30 UTC+1)

Barry Town United (Wales)	0–0	(Northern Ireland) Cliftonville
	Report

Cardiff International Sports Stadium, Cardiff (Note: Barry Town United played their home match at Cardiff International Sports Stadium, Cardiff, instead of their regular stadium Jenner Park Stadium, Barry which did not meet UEFA requirements.)
Attendance: 2,106
Referee: Jason Barcelo (Gibraltar)
4 July 2019
20:45 (19:45 UTC+1)

Cliftonville (Northern Ireland)	4–0	(Wales) Barry Town United
McMenamin 25'; Gormley 44'; McDermott 82'; R. Donnelly 84'	Report

Solitude, Belfast
Attendance: 1,946
Referee: Fyodor Zammit (Malta)

Cliftonville won 4–0 on aggregate.

== First qualifying round ==
=== Summary ===
The first legs were played on 9, 10 and 11 July, and the second legs on 16, 17 and 18 July 2019.

Team 1	Agg.	Team 2	1st leg	2nd leg
Malmö FF (Sweden)	11–0	(Northern Ireland) Ballymena United	7–0	4–0
Connah's Quay Nomads (Wales)	3–2	(Scotland) Kilmarnock	1–2	2–0
KuPS (Finland)	3–1 (Note: Order of legs reversed after original draw.)	(Belarus) Vitebsk	2–0	1–1
Breiðablik (Iceland)	1–2	(Liechtenstein) Vaduz	0–0	1–2
Brann (Norway)	3–4	(Republic of Ireland) Shamrock Rovers	2–2	1–2
Ordabasy (Kazakhstan)	3–0	(Georgia (country)) Torpedo Kutaisi	1–0	2–0
Europa (Gibraltar)	0–3	(Poland) Legia Warsaw	0–0	0–3
CSKA Sofia (Bulgaria)	4–0	(Montenegro) Titograd Podgorica	4–0	0–0
Gżira United (Malta)	3–3 (a)	(Croatia) Hajduk Split	0–2	3–1
Flora (Estonia)	4–2	(Serbia) Radnički Niš	2–0	2–2
Maccabi Haifa (Israel)	5–2	(Slovenia) Mura	2–0	3–2
Debrecen (Hungary)	4–1	(Albania) Kukësi	3–0	1–1
Čukarički (Serbia)	8–0	(Armenia) Banants	3–0	5–0
Jeunesse Esch (Luxembourg)	1–1 (a)	(Kazakhstan) Tobol	0–0	1–1
FCSB (Romania)	4–1	(Moldova) Milsami Orhei	2–0	2–1
Crusaders (Northern Ireland)	5–2	(Faroe Islands) B36	2–0	3–2
Brøndby (Denmark)	4–3	(Finland) Inter Turku	4–1	0–2
Molde (Norway)	7–1	(Iceland) KR	7–1	0–0
St Joseph's (Gibraltar)	0–10	(Scotland) Rangers	0–4	0–6
Cork City (Republic of Ireland)	2–3	(Luxembourg) Progrès Niederkorn	0–2	2–1
Ružomberok (Slovakia)	0–4	(Bulgaria) Levski Sofia	0–2	0–2
Akademija Pandev (North Macedonia)	0–6	(Bosnia and Herzegovina) Zrinjski Mostar	0–3	0–3
Speranța Nisporeni (Moldova)	0–9	(Azerbaijan) Neftçi	0–3	0–6
Zeta (Montenegro)	1–5	(Hungary) MOL Fehérvár	1–5	0–0
Shakhtyor Soligorsk (Belarus)	2–0	(Malta) Hibernians	1–0	1–0
Olimpija Ljubljana (Slovenia)	4–3	(Latvia) RFS	2–3	2–0
Honvéd (Hungary)	4–2	(Lithuania) Žalgiris	3–1	1–1
Alashkert (Armenia)	6–1	(North Macedonia) Makedonija GP	3–1	3–0
Radnik Bijeljina (Bosnia and Herzegovina)	2–2 (2–3 p)	(Slovakia) Spartak Trnava	2–0	0–2 (a.e.t.)
Fola Esch (Luxembourg)	2–4	(Georgia (country)) Chikhura Sachkhere	1–2	1–2
Dinamo Tbilisi (Georgia (country))	7–0	(Andorra) Engordany	6–0	1–0
Široki Brijeg (Bosnia and Herzegovina)	2–4	(Kazakhstan) Kairat	1–2	1–2
DAC Dunajská Streda (Slovakia)	3–3 (a)	(Poland) Cracovia	1–1	2–2 (a.e.t.)
Kauno Žalgiris (Lithuania)	0–6	(Cyprus) Apollon Limassol	0–2	0–4
Ventspils (Latvia)	3–1	(Albania) Teuta	3–0	0–1
Stjarnan (Iceland)	4–4 (a)	(Estonia) FCI Levadia	2–1	2–3 (a.e.t.)
Cliftonville (Northern Ireland)	1–6	(Norway) Haugesund	0–1	1–5
Riteriai (Lithuania)	1–1 (a)	(Faroe Islands) KÍ	1–1	0–0
Liepāja (Latvia)	3–2	(Belarus) Dinamo Minsk	1–1	2–1
St Patrick's Athletic (Republic of Ireland)	1–4	(Sweden) IFK Norrköping	0–2	1–2
Aberdeen (Scotland)	4–2	(Finland) RoPS	2–1	2–1
Balzan (Malta)	3–5	(Slovenia) Domžale	3–4	0–1
Laçi (Albania)	1–2	(Israel) Hapoel Be'er Sheva	1–1	0–1
Narva Trans (Estonia)	1–6	(Montenegro) Budućnost Podgorica	0–2	1–4
Sabail (Azerbaijan)	4–6	(Romania) Universitatea Craiova	2–3	2–3
Pyunik (Armenia)	5–4	(North Macedonia) Shkupi	3–3	2–1
AEK Larnaca (Cyprus)	2–0	(Moldova) Petrocub Hîncești	1–0	1–0

=== Matches ===
11 July 2019
19:00

Malmö FF (Sweden)	7–0	(Northern Ireland) Ballymena United
Rosenberg 31', 33', 48'; Rakip 44', 74'; Brorsson 46'; Molins 54'	Report

Eleda Stadion, Malmö
Attendance: 8,667
Referee: Igor Pajač (Croatia)
18 July 2019
20:45 (19:45 UTC+1)

Ballymena United (Northern Ireland)	0–4	(Sweden) Malmö FF
	Report	Safari 27'; Molins 52'; Rakip 68'; Gall 79' (pen.)

Ballymena Showgrounds, Ballymena
Attendance: 1,736
Referee: Oskari Hämäläinen (Finland)

Malmö FF won 11–0 on aggregate.

11 July 2019
20:00 (19:00 UTC+1)

Connah's Quay Nomads (Wales)	1–2	(Scotland) Kilmarnock
Taylor 75' (o.g.)	Report	Brophy 82' (pen.); Findlay 90+2'

Belle Vue, Rhyl (Note: Connah's Quay Nomads played their home matches at Belle Vue, Rhyl, instead of their regular stadium Deeside Stadium, Connah's Quay which did not meet UEFA requirements.)
Attendance: 1,410
Referee: Erik Lambrechts (Belgium)
18 July 2019
20:45 (19:45 UTC+1)

Kilmarnock (Scotland)	0–2	(Wales) Connah's Quay Nomads
	Report	Wignall 50'; Morris 80' (pen.)

Rugby Park, Kilmarnock
Attendance: 8,306
Referee: Ferenc Karakó (Hungary)

Connah's Quay Nomads won 3–2 on aggregate.

11 July 2019
18:00 (19:00 UTC+3)

KuPS (Finland)	2–0	(Belarus) Vitebsk
Murillo 61'; Rangel 74'	Report

Kuopio Football Stadium, Kuopio
Attendance: 2,560
Referee: Danilo Grujić (Serbia)
18 July 2019
20:30 (21:30 UTC+3)

Vitebsk (Belarus)	1–1	(Finland) KuPS
Starhorodskyi 27'	Report	Diallo 53'

Vitebsky Central Sport Complex, Vitebsk
Attendance: 4,780
Referee: Hugo Miguel (Portugal)

KuPS won 3–1 on aggregate.

11 July 2019
22:00 (20:00 UTC+0)

Breiðablik (Iceland)	0–0	(Liechtenstein) Vaduz
	Report

Kópavogsvöllur, Kópavogur
Attendance: 1,153
Referee: Nikola Popov (Bulgaria)
18 July 2019
19:00

Vaduz (Liechtenstein)	2–1	(Iceland) Breiðablik
Coulibaly 57'; Schwizer 79'	Report	Gunnlaugsson 90+3'

Rheinpark Stadion, Vaduz
Attendance: 837
Referee: Genc Nuza (Kosovo)

Vaduz won 2–1 on aggregate.

11 July 2019
19:00

Brann (Norway)	2–2	(Republic of Ireland) Shamrock Rovers
Teniste 12'; Berisha 36' (pen.)	Report	Ordagić 34' (o.g.); Lopes 90+4'

Brann Stadion, Bergen
Attendance: 4,560
Referee: Juxhin Xhaja (Albania)
18 July 2019
21:00 (20:00 UTC+1)

Shamrock Rovers (Republic of Ireland)	2–1	(Norway) Brann
Byrne 76'; O'Neill 87'	Report	Bamba 57'

Tallaght Stadium, Tallaght
Attendance: 5,135
Referee: Kári Jóannesarson Á Høvdanum (Faroe Islands)

Shamrock Rovers won 4–3 on aggregate.

11 July 2019
16:00 (20:00 UTC+6)

Ordabasy (Kazakhstan)	1–0	(Georgia (country)) Torpedo Kutaisi
Erlanov 67'	Report

Kazhimukan Munaitpasov Stadium, Shymkent
Attendance: 15,900
Referee: Roomer Tarajev (Estonia)
18 July 2019
19:00 (21:00 UTC+4)

Torpedo Kutaisi (Georgia (country))	0–2	(Kazakhstan) Ordabasy
	Report	Mehanović 81'; Badibanga 90+4'

Mikheil Meskhi Stadium, Tbilisi (Note: Torpedo Kutaisi played their home matches at Mikheil Meskhi Stadium, Tbilisi, instead of their regular stadium Ramaz Shengelia Stadium, Kutaisi.)
Attendance: 3,753
Referee: Aristotelis Diamantopoulos (Greece)

Ordabasy won 3–0 on aggregate.

11 July 2019
20:30

Europa (Gibraltar)	0–0	(Poland) Legia Warsaw
	Report

Victoria Stadium, Gibraltar
Attendance: 787
Referee: Alex Troleis (Faroe Islands)
18 July 2019
21:00

Legia Warsaw (Poland)	3–0	(Gibraltar) Europa
Carlitos 7', 60'; Kulenović 13'	Report

Polish Army Stadium, Warsaw
Attendance: 14,839
Referee: Robert Jenkins (Wales)

Legia Warsaw won 3–0 on aggregate.

9 July 2019
19:30 (20:30 UTC+3)

CSKA Sofia (Bulgaria)	4–0	(Montenegro) Titograd Podgorica
Evandro 40'; Rodrigues 53'; Geferson 55'; Malinov 72'	Report

Stadion Balgarska Armia, Sofia
Attendance: 8,500
Referee: Luis Godinho (Portugal)
16 July 2019
20:30

Titograd Podgorica (Montenegro)	0–0	(Bulgaria) CSKA Sofia
	Report

Podgorica City Stadium, Podgorica (Note: Titograd played their home match at Podgorica City Stadium, Podgorica, instead of their regular stadium Mladost Stadium, Podgorica which did not meet UEFA requirements.)
Attendance: 969
Referee: Vasilis Dimitriou (Cyprus)

CSKA Sofia won 4–0 on aggregate.

9 July 2019
18:00

Gżira United (Malta)	0–2	(Croatia) Hajduk Split
	Report	Gyurcsó 44'; Dolček 90+6'

Centenary Stadium, Ta' Qali
Attendance: 683
Referee: Gal Leibovitz (Israel)
18 July 2019
20:00

Hajduk Split (Croatia)	1–3	(Malta) Gżira United
Jradi 7'	Report	Jefferson 57'; Koné 69', 90+6'

Stadion Poljud, Split
Attendance: 18,236
Referee: Nikolas Neokleous (Cyprus)

3–3 on aggregate; Gżira United won on away goals.

11 July 2019
18:00 (19:00 UTC+3)

Flora (Estonia)	2–0	(Serbia) Radnički Niš
Lepik 75'; Vassiljev 89'	Report

A. Le Coq Arena, Tallinn
Attendance: 1,250
Referee: Alexandru Tean (Moldova)
18 July 2019
20:45

Radnički Niš (Serbia)	2–2	(Estonia) Flora
Mihajlović 68'; Čumić 84'	Report	Pürg 80'; Lepik 90+3'

Čair Stadium, Niš
Attendance: 4,329
Referee: Zbyněk Proske (Czech Republic)

Flora won 4–2 on aggregate.

11 July 2019
19:00 (20:00 UTC+3)

Maccabi Haifa (Israel)	2–0	(Slovenia) Mura
Ashkenazi 64'; Awaed 68'	Report

Sammy Ofer Stadium, Haifa
Attendance: 16,127
Referee: Manfredas Lukjančukas (Lithuania)
18 July 2019
20:00

Mura (Slovenia)	2–3	(Israel) Maccabi Haifa
Bobičanec 6'; Šporn 81'	Report	Awaed 31'; Ashkenazi 35', 76'

Fazanerija City Stadium, Murska Sobota
Attendance: 3,950
Referee: Tomasz Musiał (Poland)

Maccabi Haifa won 5–2 on aggregate.

11 July 2019
19:00

Debrecen (Hungary)	3–0	(Albania) Kukësi
Garba 54'; Varga 77', 83'	Report

Nagyerdei Stadion, Debrecen
Attendance: 10,250
Referee: Sebastian Gishamer (Austria)
18 July 2019
20:00

Kukësi (Albania)	1–1	(Hungary) Debrecen
Ethemi 17'	Report	Szatmári 58'

Elbasan Arena, Elbasan (Note: Kukësi played their home match at Elbasan Arena, Elbasan, instead of their regular stadium Zeqir Ymeri Stadium, Kukës.)
Attendance: 547
Referee: Stanislav Todorov (Bulgaria)

Debrecen won 4–1 on aggregate.

11 July 2019
20:30

Čukarički (Serbia)	3–0	(Armenia) Banants
Tedić 43', 90+2'; Kovač 80'	Report

Čukarički Stadium, Belgrade
Attendance: 1,203
Referee: Ívar Orri Kristjánsson (Iceland)
16 July 2019
17:00 (19:00 UTC+4)

Banants (Armenia)	0–5	(Serbia) Čukarički
	Report	Stojanović 3', 75' (pen.); Tedić 31'; Luković 49'; Birmančević 71'

Banants Stadium, Yerevan
Attendance: 2,100
Referee: Ioannis Papadopoulos (Greece)

Čukarički won 8–0 on aggregate.

10 July 2019
17:55

Jeunesse Esch (Luxembourg)	0–0	(Kazakhstan) Tobol
	Report

Stade de la Frontière, Esch-sur-Alzette
Attendance: 1,384
Referee: Eldorjan Hamiti (Albania)
18 July 2019
14:00 (18:00 UTC+6)

Tobol (Kazakhstan)	1–1	(Luxembourg) Jeunesse Esch
Meddour 22' (o.g.)	Report	Arslan 59' (pen.)

Astana Arena, Nur-Sultan (Note: Tobol played their home match at Astana Arena, Nur-Sultan, instead of their regular stadium Kostanay Central Stadium, Kostanay.)
Attendance: 2,500
Referee: Emmanouil Skoulas (Greece)

1–1 on aggregate; Jeunesse Esch won on away goals.

11 July 2019
20:30 (21:30 UTC+3)

FCSB (Romania)	2–0	(Moldova) Milsami Orhei
Tănase 12', 56'	Report

Stadionul Marin Anastasovici, Giurgiu (Note: FCSB played their home matches at Stadionul Marin Anastasovici, Giurgiu, instead of their regular stadium Arena Națională, Bucharest.)
Attendance: 4,850
Referee: Kristoffer Hagenes (Norway)
18 July 2019
19:00 (20:00 UTC+3)

Milsami Orhei (Moldova)	1–2	(Romania) FCSB
Bolohan 47'	Report	Dumitru 4'; Oaidă 42'

CSR Orhei, Orhei
Attendance: 3,000
Referee: Timotheos Christofi (Cyprus)

FCSB won 4–1 on aggregate.

11 July 2019
19:00 (18:00 UTC+1)

Crusaders (Northern Ireland)	2–0	(Faroe Islands) B36
Hegarty 33'; Lowry 79'	Report

Seaview, Belfast
Attendance: 1,112
Referee: Yigal Frid (Israel)
18 July 2019
20:00 (19:00 UTC+1)

B36 (Faroe Islands)	2–3	(Northern Ireland) Crusaders
H. Samuelsen 37'; Cieślewicz 51'	Report	Forsythe 3'; Heatley 28', 68'

Gundadalur, Tórshavn
Attendance: 1,422
Referee: Milovan Milačić (Montenegro)

Crusaders won 5–2 on aggregate.

11 July 2019
19:00

Brøndby (Denmark)	4–1	(Finland) Inter Turku
Wilczek 5', 67'; Tibbling 71'; Fisker 78'	Report	Furuholm 20'

Brøndby Stadium, Brøndbyvester
Attendance: 10,275
Referee: Kristoffer Karlsson (Sweden)
18 July 2019
17:30 (18:30 UTC+3)

Inter Turku (Finland)	2–0	(Denmark) Brøndby
Markkula 52'; Valenčič 56'	Report

Veritas Stadion, Turku
Attendance: 3,711
Referee: Keith Kennedy (Northern Ireland)

Brøndby won 4–3 on aggregate.

11 July 2019
19:00

Molde (Norway)	7–1	(Iceland) KR
James 7', 31', 41'; Aursnes 29'; Forren 63'; Hussain 66'; Omoijuanfo 90+3'	Report	Thomsen 71'

Aker Stadion, Molde
Attendance: 3,756
Referee: Aleksandrs Golubevs (Latvia)
18 July 2019
21:00 (19:00 UTC+0)

KR (Iceland)	0–0	(Norway) Molde
	Report

KR-völlur, Reykjavík
Attendance: 355
Referee: Ian McNabb (Northern Ireland)

Molde won 7–1 on aggregate.

9 July 2019
17:55

St Joseph's (Gibraltar)	0–4	(Scotland) Rangers
	Report	Jack 50'; Ojo 56'; Goldson 68'; Morelos 77'

Victoria Stadium, Gibraltar
Attendance: 2,050
Referee: Nejc Kajtazović (Slovenia)
18 July 2019
20:45 (19:45 UTC+1)

Rangers (Scotland)	6–0	(Gibraltar) St Joseph's
Aribo 3'; Morelos 45+1', 57' (pen.), 66'; Defoe 77', 86'	Report

Ibrox Stadium, Glasgow
Attendance: 45,718
Referee: Christopher Jaeger (Austria)

Rangers won 10–0 on aggregate.

11 July 2019
20:45 (19:45 UTC+1)

Cork City (Republic of Ireland)	0–2	(Luxembourg) Progrès Niederkorn
	Report	Muratovic 11'; De Almeida 21' (pen.)

Turners Cross, Cork
Attendance: 3,137
Referee: Aleksandrs Anufrijevs (Latvia)
18 July 2019
19:30

Progrès Niederkorn (Luxembourg)	1–2	(Republic of Ireland) Cork City
Bah 68'	Report	Buckley 3'; McCarthy 47'

Stade Municipal, Differdange
Attendance: 1,927
Referee: Matthew De Gabriele (Malta)

Progrès Niederkorn won 3–2 on aggregate.

11 July 2019
18:30

Ružomberok (Slovakia)	0–2	(Bulgaria) Levski Sofia
	Report	Mariani 36'; Paulinho 51'

Štadión pod Čebraťom, Ružomberok
Attendance: 3,695
Referee: Petri Viljanen (Finland)
18 July 2019
18:30 (19:30 UTC+3)

Levski Sofia (Bulgaria)	2–0	(Slovakia) Ružomberok
Mariani 33'; Alar 90+2'	Report

Stadion Vivacom Arena - Georgi Asparuhov, Sofia
Attendance: 17,250
Referee: Veaceslav Banari (Moldova)

Levski Sofia won 4–0 on aggregate.

11 July 2019
19:00

Akademija Pandev (North Macedonia)	0–3	(Bosnia and Herzegovina) Zrinjski Mostar
	Report	Hadžić 12'; Mandić 28'; Govedarica 55'

Toše Proeski Arena, Skopje (Note: Akademija Pandev played their home match at Toše Proeski Arena, Skopje, instead of their regular stadium Stadion Kukuš, Strumica which did not meet UEFA requirements.)
Attendance: 1,562
Referee: Kai Erik Steen (Norway)
18 July 2019
19:00

Zrinjski Mostar (Bosnia and Herzegovina)	3–0	(North Macedonia) Akademija Pandev
Mandić 50'; Govedarica 79'; Gojković 90+2'	Report

Stadion pod Bijelim Brijegom, Mostar
Attendance: 2,500
Referee: Ondrej Pechanec (Czech Republic)

Zrinjski Mostar won 6–0 on aggregate.

11 July 2019
19:00 (20:00 UTC+3)

Speranța Nisporeni (Moldova)	0–3	(Azerbaijan) Neftçi
	Report	Mahmudov 16' (pen.); Joseph-Monrose 36'; Hajiyev 76'

Zimbru Stadium, Chișinău (Note: Speranța Nisporeni played their home match at Zimbru Stadium, Chișinău, instead of their regular stadium Stadionul Mircea Eliade, Nisporeni which did not meet UEFA requirements.)
Attendance: 1,370
Referee: Tim Marshall (Northern Ireland)
18 July 2019
19:00 (21:00 UTC+4)

Neftçi (Azerbaijan)	6–0	(Moldova) Speranța Nisporeni
Platellas 18', 40'; Mahmudov 24' (pen.); Dário 42'; Joseph-Monrose 67'; Zulfugarli 78'	Report

Bakcell Arena, Baku
Attendance: 6,500
Referee: Julian Weinberger (Austria)

Neftçi won 9–0 on aggregate.

11 July 2019
20:30

Zeta (Montenegro)	1–5	(Hungary) MOL Fehérvár
Goranović 17'	Report	Négo 3', 12', 23'; Juhász 86'; Huszti 90+3'

Podgorica City Stadium, Podgorica (Note: Zeta played their home match at Podgorica City Stadium, Podgorica, instead of their regular stadium Stadion Trešnjica, Golubovci which did not meet UEFA requirements.)
Attendance: 965
Referee: Georgi Vadachkoria (Georgia)
18 July 2019
20:00

MOL Fehérvár (Hungary)	0–0	(Montenegro) Zeta
	Report

Pancho Aréna, Felcsút (Note: MOL Fehérvár played their home matches at Pancho Aréna, Felcsút, instead of their regular stadium MOL Aréna Sóstó, Székesfehérvár.)
Attendance: 2,148
Referee: Paul McLaughlin (Republic of Ireland)

MOL Fehérvár won 5–1 on aggregate.

11 July 2019
19:00 (20:00 UTC+3)

Shakhtyor Soligorsk (Belarus)	1–0	(Malta) Hibernians
Gromyko 69'	Report

Stroitel Stadium, Soligorsk
Attendance: 3,048
Referee: Jovan Kaluđerović (Montenegro)
18 July 2019
20:00

Hibernians (Malta)	0–1	(Belarus) Shakhtyor Soligorsk
	Report	Tatarkov 65'

Centenary Stadium, Ta' Qali
Attendance: 608
Referee: Furkat Atazhanov (Kazakhstan)

Shakhtyor Soligorsk won 2–0 on aggregate.

11 July 2019
20:00

Olimpija Ljubljana (Slovenia)	2–3	(Latvia) RFS
Boakye 81'; Menalo 90'	Report	Lemajić 52' (pen.); Kļuškins 88'; Vukmanić 90+3'

Stožice Stadium, Ljubljana
Attendance: 4,200
Referee: Urs Schnyder (Switzerland)
18 July 2019
18:00 (19:00 UTC+3)

RFS (Latvia)	0–2	(Slovenia) Olimpija Ljubljana
	Report	Çekiçi 45+1'; Savić 90+2'

Daugava Stadium, Riga (Note: RFS played their home match at Daugava Stadium, Riga, instead of their regular stadium Stadions Arkādija, Riga which did not meet UEFA requirements.)
Attendance: 3,652
Referee: Peter Kjærsgaard (Denmark)

Olimpija Ljubljana won 4–3 on aggregate.

11 July 2019
21:00

Honvéd (Hungary)	3–1	(Lithuania) Žalgiris
Banó-Szabó 32'; Ngog 55'; Gazdag 69' (pen.)	Report	Uzėla 90+2'

Illovszky Rudolf Stadion, Budapest (Note: Honvéd played their first qualification home match at Illovszky Rudolf Stadion, Budapest and second qualification home match at ETO Park, Győr, instead of their regular stadium Bozsik József Stadion, Budapest due to reconstruction.)
Attendance: 3,622
Referee: Boris Marhefka (Slovakia)
18 July 2019
19:00 (20:00 UTC+3)

Žalgiris (Lithuania)	1–1	(Hungary) Honvéd
Antal 18'	Report	Kamber 62'

LFF Stadium, Vilnius
Attendance: 3,725
Referee: Rohit Saggi (Norway)

Honvéd won 4–2 on aggregate.

11 July 2019
17:00 (19:00 UTC+4)

Alashkert (Armenia)	3–1	(North Macedonia) Makedonija GP
Tankov 16'; Sekulić 66'; Bianor 82' (o.g.)	Report	Jasharoski 52'

Yerevan Football Academy Stadium, Yerevan (Note: Alashkert played their home matches at Yerevan Football Academy Stadium, Yerevan, instead of their regular stadium Alashkert Stadium, Yerevan.)
Attendance: 1,285
Referee: Nathan Verboomen (Belgium)
18 July 2019
16:30

Makedonija GP (North Macedonia)	0–3	(Armenia) Alashkert
	Report	Nenadović 21'; Thiago Galvão 68'; Voskanyan 74'

Petar Miloševski Training Centre, Skopje (Note: Makedonija GP played their home match at Petar Miloševski Training Centre, Skopje, instead of their regular stadium Gjorče Petrov Stadium, Skopje which did not meet UEFA requirements.)
Attendance: 656
Referee: Christophe Pires (Luxembourg)

Alashkert won 6–1 on aggregate.

11 July 2019
19:00

Radnik Bijeljina (Bosnia and Herzegovina)	2–0	(Slovakia) Spartak Trnava
Mekić 34'; Đurić 48'	Report

Banja Luka City Stadium, Banja Luka (Note: Radnik Bijeljina played their home match at Banja Luka City Stadium, Banja Luka, instead of their regular stadium Gradski stadion, Bijeljina.)
Attendance: 1,500
Referee: Volen Chinkov (Bulgaria)
18 July 2019
20:45

Spartak Trnava (Slovakia)	2–0 (a.e.t.)	(Bosnia and Herzegovina) Radnik Bijeljina
Sobczyk 10'; Mihálek 87'	Report
Penalties
Tešija (penalty scored); Sobczyk (penalty scored); Záhumenský (penalty missed); Lovat (penalty missed); Jakúbek (penalty scored)	3–2	(penalty scored) Merajić; (penalty missed) Motika; (penalty scored) Mekić; (penalty missed) Plavšić; (penalty missed) Popara

Anton Malatinský Stadium, Trnava
Attendance: 4,222
Referee: Rahim Hasanov (Azerbaijan)

2–2 on aggregate; Spartak Trnava won 3–2 on penalties.

11 July 2019
19:30

Fola Esch (Luxembourg)	1–2	(Georgia (country)) Chikhura Sachkhere
Sinani 22' (pen.)	Report	Sardalishvili 59'; Koripadze 86' (pen.)

Stade Émile Mayrisch, Esch-sur-Alzette
Attendance: 1,087
Referee: Rauf Jabarov (Azerbaijan)
17 July 2019
18:00 (20:00 UTC+4)

Chikhura Sachkhere (Georgia (country))	2–1	(Luxembourg) Fola Esch
Ardazishvili 25'; Sardalishvili 73'	Report	Sinani 89' (pen.)

Boris Paichadze Dinamo Arena, Tbilisi (Note: Chikhura Sachkhere played their home matches at Boris Paichadze Dinamo Arena, Tbilisi, instead of their regular stadium Central Stadium, Sachkhere which did not meet UEFA requirements.)
Attendance: 1,458
Referee: Dragan Petrović (Bosnia and Herzegovina)

Chikhura Sachkhere won 4–2 on aggregate.

11 July 2019
19:00 (21:00 UTC+4)

Dinamo Tbilisi (Georgia (country))	6–0	(Andorra) Engordany
Ninua 6'; Kukhianidze 21', 71'; Kavtaradze 61'; Kutalia 69' (pen.); Zaria 80'	Report

Boris Paichadze Dinamo Arena, Tbilisi
Attendance: 3,680
Referee: Morten Krogh (Denmark)
18 July 2019
19:30

Engordany (Andorra)	0–1	(Georgia (country)) Dinamo Tbilisi
	Report	Medioub 81'

Estadi Comunal, Andorra la Vella
Attendance: 408
Referee: Balázs Berke (Hungary)

Dinamo Tbilisi won 7–0 on aggregate.

11 July 2019
21:00

Široki Brijeg (Bosnia and Herzegovina)	1–2	(Kazakhstan) Kairat
Yenin 34'	Report	Eseola 29', 58'

Stadion Pecara, Široki Brijeg
Attendance: 2,436
Referee: Sebastian Colțescu (Romania)
18 July 2019
16:30 (20:30 UTC+6)

Kairat (Kazakhstan)	2–1	(Bosnia and Herzegovina) Široki Brijeg
Orazov 90+1'; Kuat 90+3'	Report	Bagarić 90' (pen.)

Almaty Central Stadium, Almaty
Attendance: 18,500
Referee: Denys Shurman (Ukraine)

Kairat won 4–2 on aggregate.

11 July 2019
20:30

DAC Dunajská Streda (Slovakia)	1–1	(Poland) Cracovia
Divković 44'	Report	Kružliak 40' (o.g.)

MOL Aréna, Dunajská Streda
Attendance: 9,860
Referee: Rade Obrenovič (Slovenia)
18 July 2019
19:00

Cracovia (Poland)	2–2 (a.e.t.)	(Slovakia) DAC Dunajská Streda
Lopes 2'; Piszczek 120+2'	Report	Ronan 47'; Ramírez 94'

Józef Piłsudski Cracovia Stadium, Kraków
Attendance: 13,255
Referee: Athanasios Tzilos (Greece)

3–3 on aggregate; DAC Dunajská Streda won on away goals.

11 July 2019
19:00 (20:00 UTC+3)

Kauno Žalgiris (Lithuania)	0–2	(Cyprus) Apollon Limassol
	Report	Pittas 14'; Zelaya 90' (pen.)

ARVI Football Arena, Marijampolė (Note: Kauno Žalgiris played their home match at Sūduva Stadium, Marijampolė, instead of their temporary stadium SM Tauras Stadium, Kaunas which did not meet UEFA requirements.)
Attendance: 717
Referee: Admir Šehović (Bosnia and Herzegovina)
18 July 2019
19:00 (20:00 UTC+3)

Apollon Limassol (Cyprus)	4–0	(Lithuania) Kauno Žalgiris
Zelaya 5', 43' (pen.), 60' (pen.); Szalai 83'	Report

GSP Stadium, Nicosia (Note: Apollon Limassol played their home matches at GSP Stadium, Nicosia, instead of their regular stadium Tsirio Stadium, Limassol.)
Attendance: 1,427
Referee: Vladimir Moskalev (Russia)

Apollon Limassol won 6–0 on aggregate.

11 July 2019
16:45 (17:45 UTC+3)

Ventspils (Latvia)	3–0	(Albania) Teuta
Serhiychuk 5'; Ulimbaševs 78'; Aiyegun 88'	Report

Ventspils Olimpiskais Stadions, Ventspils
Attendance: 1,730
Referee: Daniyar Sakhi (Kazakhstan)
18 July 2019
17:00

Teuta (Albania)	1–0	(Latvia) Ventspils
Kallaku 48'	Report

Niko Dovana Stadium, Durrës
Attendance: 575
Referee: Erez Papir (Israel)

Ventspils won 3–1 on aggregate.

11 July 2019
22:00 (20:00 UTC+0)

Stjarnan (Iceland)	2–1	(Estonia) FCI Levadia
Ragnarsson 15', 74'	Report	Andreyev 79'

Stjörnuvöllur, Garðabær
Attendance: 876
Referee: Denis Scherbakov (Belarus)
18 July 2019
18:00 (19:00 UTC+3)

FCI Levadia (Estonia)	3–2 (a.e.t.)	(Iceland) Stjarnan
Osipov 17', 89'; Kruglov 105' (pen.)	Report	Ragnarsson 25'; Guðjónsson 120+2'

A. Le Coq Arena, Tallinn
Attendance: 1,446
Referee: Besfort Kasumi (Kosovo)

4–4 on aggregate; Stjarnan won on away goals.

11 July 2019
20:45 (19:45 UTC+1)

Cliftonville (Northern Ireland)	0–1	(Norway) Haugesund
	Report	Grindheim 42'

Solitude, Belfast
Attendance: 1,342
Referee: Laurent Kopriwa (Luxembourg)
18 July 2019
19:00

Haugesund (Norway)	5–1	(Northern Ireland) Cliftonville
Velde 5', 68'; Sandberg 36'; Koné 45+1'; Leite 52'	Report	McMenamin 17'

Haugesund Stadion, Haugesund
Attendance: 2,633
Referee: Mario Zebec (Croatia)

Haugesund won 6–1 on aggregate.

11 July 2019
18:30 (19:30 UTC+3)

Riteriai (Lithuania)	1–1	(Faroe Islands) KÍ
Borovskij 46'	Report	Andreasen 56'

LFF Stadium, Vilnius
Attendance: 1,480
Referee: Bram Van Driessche (Belgium)
16 July 2019
19:00 (18:00 UTC+1)

KÍ (Faroe Islands)	0–0	(Lithuania) Riteriai
	Report

Svangaskarð, Toftir
Attendance: 980
Referee: Yaroslav Kozyk (Ukraine)

1–1 on aggregate; KÍ won on away goals.

11 July 2019
19:00 (20:00 UTC+3)

Liepāja (Latvia)	1–1	(Belarus) Dinamo Minsk
Ikaunieks 12' (pen.)	Report	Kaplenko 88'

Daugava Stadium, Liepāja
Attendance: 3,793
Referee: António Carvalho Nobre (Portugal)
18 July 2019
18:30 (19:30 UTC+3)

Dinamo Minsk (Belarus)	1–2	(Latvia) Liepāja
Raļkevičs 90+1' (o.g.)	Report	Spătaru 10'; Dodô 70'

Dinamo Stadium, Minsk
Attendance: 6,705
Referee: Nick Walsh (Scotland)

Liepāja won 3–2 on aggregate.

11 July 2019
20:45 (19:45 UTC+1)

St Patrick's Athletic (Republic of Ireland)	0–2	(Sweden) IFK Norrköping
	Report	Thern 55'; Desmond 85' (o.g.)

Richmond Park, Dublin
Attendance: 2,389
Referee: Lionel Tschudi (Switzerland)
18 July 2019
20:00

IFK Norrköping (Sweden)	2–1	(Republic of Ireland) St Patrick's Athletic
Larsson 36'; Holmberg 85'	Report	Clifford 72'

Nya Parken, Norrköping
Attendance: 5,925
Referee: Dejan Jakimovski (North Macedonia)

IFK Norrköping won 4–1 on aggregate.

11 July 2019
20:45 (19:45 UTC+1)

Aberdeen (Scotland)	2–1	(Finland) RoPS
McGinn 36'; Cosgrove 48'	Report	Jäntti 90+3'

Pittodrie Stadium, Aberdeen
Attendance: 14,377
Referee: Kaspar Sjöberg (Sweden)
18 July 2019
18:00 (19:00 UTC+3)

RoPS (Finland)	1–2	(Scotland) Aberdeen
Kada 2'	Report	Cosgrove 27' (pen.); Ferguson 90+4'

Rovaniemen keskuskenttä, Rovaniemi
Attendance: 2,000
Referee: Ümit Öztürk (Turkey)

Aberdeen won 4–2 on aggregate.

11 July 2019
18:30

Balzan (Malta)	3–4	(Slovenia) Domžale
Correa 34'; Ljubomirac 38'; Effiong 56'	Report	Ibričić 5' (pen.); Vuk 49'; Sikošek 61'; Podlogar 76'

Centenary Stadium, Ta' Qali
Attendance: 389
Referee: Aleksei Matyunin (Russia)
18 July 2019
20:45

Domžale (Slovenia)	1–0	(Malta) Balzan
Vuk 21'	Report

Domžale Sports Park, Domžale
Attendance: 1,648
Referee: Marcel Bîrsan (Romania)

Domžale won 5–3 on aggregate.

11 July 2019
17:30

Laçi (Albania)	1–1	(Israel) Hapoel Be'er Sheva
Nwabueze 3'	Report	Levi 78'

Laçi Stadium, Laç
Attendance: 1,400
Referee: Loukas Sotiríou (Cyprus)
18 July 2019
19:30 (20:30 UTC+3)

Hapoel Be'er Sheva (Israel)	1–0	(Albania) Laçi
Sabag 69'	Report

Turner Stadium, Be'er Sheva
Attendance: 10,980
Referee: Tihomir Pejin (Croatia)

Hapoel Be'er Sheva won 2–1 on aggregate.

11 July 2019
17:30 (18:30 UTC+3)

Narva Trans (Estonia)	0–2	(Montenegro) Budućnost Podgorica
	Report	Ivanović 12'; Mijić 88'

Rakvere Linnastaadion, Rakvere (Note: Narva Trans played their home match at Rakvere Linnastaadion, Rakvere, instead of their regular stadium Narva Kreenholm Stadium, Narva.)
Attendance: 319
Referee: Sergey Tsinkevich (Belarus)
18 July 2019
20:45

Budućnost Podgorica (Montenegro)	4–1	(Estonia) Narva Trans
Vučić 2'; Bakić 49'; Perović 56'; Zarubica 78'	Report	Golovljov 39'

Podgorica City Stadium, Podgorica
Attendance: 1,700
Referee: Stefan Apostolov (Bulgaria)

Budućnost Podgorica won 6–1 on aggregate.

11 July 2019
18:00 (20:00 UTC+4)

Sabail (Azerbaijan)	2–3	(Romania) Universitatea Craiova
Ramazanov 33', 82'	Report	Mateiu 13'; Bancu 51'; Roman 67'

Bayil Arena, Baku
Attendance: 2,550
Referee: Fyodor Zammit (Malta)
18 July 2019
18:00 (19:00 UTC+3)

Universitatea Craiova (Romania)	3–2	(Azerbaijan) Sabail
Cicâldău 28'; Vătăjelu 54'; Fortes 90'	Report	Ramazanov 67'; Duventru 69'

Stadionul Ion Oblemenco, Craiova
Attendance: 15,763
Referee: Helgi Mikael Jónasson (Iceland)

Universitatea Craiova won 6–4 on aggregate.

11 July 2019
15:30 (17:30 UTC+4)

Pyunik (Armenia)	3–3	(North Macedonia) Shkupi
Vardanyan 4' (pen.); Zhestokov 80'; E. Manucharyan 85'	Report	Bajrami 26', 60'; Ilieski 43'

Gyumri City Stadium, Gyumri (Note: Pyunik played their first and second qualifying round home matches at Gyumri City Stadium, Gyumri, instead of their regular stadium Vazgen Sargsyan Republican Stadium, Yerevan.)
Attendance: 2,050
Referee: Luca Barbeno (San Marino)
18 July 2019
20:30

Shkupi (North Macedonia)	1–2	(Armenia) Pyunik
Jurina 82'	Report	Yedigaryan 7'; Miranyan 31'

Toše Proeski Arena, Skopje (Note: Shkupi played their home match at Toše Proeski Arena, Skopje, instead of their regular stadium Čair Stadium, Skopje which did not meet UEFA requirements.)
Attendance: 8,045
Referee: Vitaliy Romanov (Ukraine)

Pyunik won 5–4 on aggregate.

11 July 2019
17:30 (18:30 UTC+3)

AEK Larnaca (Cyprus)	1–0	(Moldova) Petrocub Hîncești
Hevel 4'	Report

AEK Arena – Georgios Karapatakis, Larnaca
Attendance: 3,561
Referee: Michal Očenáš (Slovakia)
18 July 2019
19:00 (20:00 UTC+3)

Petrocub Hîncești (Moldova)	0–1	(Cyprus) AEK Larnaca
	Report	Potîrniche 90+2' (o.g.)

Zimbru Stadium, Chișinău (Note: Petrocub Hîncești played their home match at Zimbru Stadium, Chișinău, instead of their regular stadium Stadionul Municipal, Hîncești which did not meet UEFA requirements.)
Attendance: 5,316
Referee: Novak Simović (Serbia)

AEK Larnaca won 2–0 on aggregate.

== Second qualifying round ==
=== Summary ===
The first legs were played on 23, 24 and 25 July, and the second legs on 30, 31 July and 1 August 2019.

Team 1	Agg.	Team 2	1st leg	2nd leg
Champions Path
Sarajevo (Bosnia and Herzegovina)	Bye	N/A	—	—
Tre Penne (San Marino)	0–10	(Lithuania) Sūduva	0–5	0–5
Piast Gliwice (Poland)	4–4 (a)	(Latvia) Riga	3–2	1–2
Partizani (Albania)	1–2	(Moldova) Sheriff Tiraspol	0–1	1–1
Ararat-Armenia	4–1	(Gibraltar) Lincoln Red Imps	2–0	2–1
Valur (Iceland)	1–5	(Bulgaria) Ludogorets Razgrad	1–1	0–4
Slovan Bratislava (Slovakia)	4–1	(Kosovo) Feronikeli	2–1	2–0
FC Santa Coloma (Andorra)	1–4	(Kazakhstan) Astana	0–0	1–4
HB (Faroe Islands)	2–3	(Northern Ireland) Linfield	2–2	0–1
Shkëndija (North Macedonia)	2–3	(Luxembourg) F91 Dudelange	1–2	1–1
Main Path
IFK Norrköping (Sweden)	3–0	(Latvia) Liepāja	2–0	1–0
Hapoel Be'er Sheva (Israel)	3–1	(Kazakhstan) Kairat	2–0	1–1
Arsenal Tula (Russia)	0–4	(Azerbaijan) Neftçi	0–1	0–3
Espanyol (Spain)	7–1	(Iceland) Stjarnan	4–0	3–1
DAC Dunajská Streda (Slovakia)	3–5	(Greece) Atromitos	1–2	2–3
Haugesund (Norway)	3–2	(Austria) Sturm Graz	2–0	1–2
AEK Larnaca (Cyprus)	7–0	(Bulgaria) Levski Sofia	3–0	4–0
Legia Warsaw (Poland)	1–0	(Finland) KuPS	1–0	0–0
Utrecht (Netherlands)	2–3	(Bosnia and Herzegovina) Zrinjski Mostar	1–1	1–2 (a.e.t.)
Pyunik (Armenia)	2–1	(Czech Republic) Jablonec	2–1	0–0
Lechia Gdańsk (Poland)	3–5	(Denmark) Brøndby	2–1	1–4 (a.e.t.)
MOL Fehérvár (Hungary)	1–2	(Liechtenstein) Vaduz	1–0	0–2 (a.e.t.)
Gabala (Azerbaijan)	0–5	(Georgia (country)) Dinamo Tbilisi	0–2	0–3
Yeni Malatyaspor (Turkey)	3–2	(Slovenia) Olimpija Ljubljana	2–2	1–0
Flora (Estonia)	2–4	(Germany) Eintracht Frankfurt	1–2	1–2
Domžale (Slovenia)	4–5	(Sweden) Malmö FF	2–2	2–3
Molde (Norway)	3–1	(Serbia) Čukarički	0–0	3–1
Chikhura Sachkhere (Georgia (country))	1–6 (Note: Order of legs reversed after original draw.)	(Scotland) Aberdeen	1–1	0–5
Gent (Belgium)	7–5	(Romania) Viitorul Constanța	6–3	1–2
Budućnost Podgorica (Montenegro)	1–4	(Ukraine) Zorya Luhansk	1–3	0–1
CSKA Sofia (Bulgaria)	1–1 (4–3 p)	(Croatia) Osijek	1–0	0–1 (a.e.t.)
Torino (Italy)	7–1	(Hungary) Debrecen	3–0	4–1
Luzern (Switzerland)	2–0	(Faroe Islands) KÍ	1–0	1–0
Rangers (Scotland)	2–0	(Luxembourg) Progrès Niederkorn	2–0	0–0
Ventspils (Latvia)	6–2	(Malta) Gżira United	4–0	2–2
Strasbourg (France)	4–3	(Israel) Maccabi Haifa	3–1	1–2
Mladá Boleslav (Czech Republic)	4–3	(Kazakhstan) Ordabasy	1–1	3–2
Shamrock Rovers (Republic of Ireland)	3–4	(Cyprus) Apollon Limassol	2–1	1–3 (a.e.t.)
AZ (Netherlands)	3–0	(Sweden) BK Häcken	0–0	3–0
Alashkert (Armenia)	3–5	(Romania) FCSB	0–3	3–2
Lokomotiv Plovdiv (Bulgaria)	3–3 (a)	(Slovakia) Spartak Trnava	2–0	1–3
Wolverhampton Wanderers (England)	6–1	(Northern Ireland) Crusaders	2–0	4–1
Aris (Greece)	1–0	(Cyprus) AEL Limassol	0–0	1–0
Jeunesse Esch (Luxembourg)	0–5	(Portugal) Vitória de Guimarães	0–1	0–4
Honvéd (Hungary)	0–0 (1–3 p)	(Romania) Universitatea Craiova	0–0	0–0 (a.e.t.)
Shakhtyor Soligorsk (Belarus)	2–0	(Denmark) Esbjerg	2–0	0–0
Connah's Quay Nomads (Wales)	0–4	(Serbia) Partizan	0–1	0–3

=== Champions Path matches ===
23 July 2019
20:30

Tre Penne (San Marino)	0–5	(Lithuania) Sūduva
	Report	Matulevičius 10'; Topčagić 20'; Švrljuga 66'; Tadić 81'; Ricketts 90+1'

San Marino Stadium, Serravalle
Attendance: 354
Referee: Krzysztof Jakubik (Poland)
30 July 2019
17:45 (18:45 UTC+3)

Sūduva (Lithuania)	5–0	(San Marino) Tre Penne
Tadić 14'; Kerla 17'; Topčagić 39', 55'; Gotal 89'	Report

Sūduva Stadium, Marijampolė
Attendance: 1,850
Referee: Artyom Kuchin (Kazakhstan)

Sūduva won 10–0 on aggregate.

25 July 2019
20:00

Piast Gliwice (Poland)	3–2	(Latvia) Riga
Czerwiński 66'; Jorge Félix 82', 85'	Report	Debelko 22'; Korun 86' (o.g.)

Stadion Piast, Gliwice
Attendance: 5,100
Referee: Manuel Schüttengruber (Austria)
1 August 2019
18:30 (19:30 UTC+3)

Riga (Latvia)	2–1	(Poland) Piast Gliwice
Pētersons 26'; Biliński 83'	Report	Jorge Félix 20'

Skonto Stadium, Riga
Attendance: 3,541
Referee: Eitan Shemeulevitch (Israel)

4–4 on aggregate; Riga won on away goals.

25 July 2019
17:30

Partizani (Albania)	0–1	(Moldova) Sheriff Tiraspol
	Report	Tambe 23'

Selman Stërmasi Stadium, Tirana
Attendance: 1,750
Referee: Kirill Levnikov (Russia)
1 August 2019
19:00 (20:00 UTC+3)

Sheriff Tiraspol (Moldova)	1–1	(Albania) Partizani
N'Diaye 63'	Report	Asani 29'

Sheriff Stadium, Tiraspol
Attendance: 5,248
Referee: Igor Pajač (Croatia)

Sheriff Tiraspol won 2–1 on aggregate.

23 July 2019
17:00 (19:00 UTC+4)

Ararat-Armenia	2–0	(Gibraltar) Lincoln Red Imps
Kobyalko 31'; Kódjo 45+2'	Report

Yerevan Football Academy Stadium, Yerevan
Attendance: 1,500
Referee: Trustin Farrugia Cann (Malta)
30 July 2019
17:45

Lincoln Red Imps (Gibraltar)	1–2	Ararat-Armenia
Hernandez 74'	Report	Ogana 45+1', 58'

Victoria Stadium, Gibraltar
Attendance: 684
Referee: Alexandre Boucaut (Belgium)

Ararat-Armenia won 4–1 on aggregate.

25 July 2019
21:00 (19:00 UTC+0)

Valur (Iceland)	1–1	(Bulgaria) Ludogorets Razgrad
Petry 11'	Report	Anicet 90+2'

Hlíðarendi, Reykjavík
Attendance: 802
Referee: Georgios Kominis (Greece)
1 August 2019
19:30 (20:30 UTC+3)

Ludogorets Razgrad (Bulgaria)	4–0	(Iceland) Valur
Starke Hedlund 7' (o.g.); Ikoko 24'; Świerczok 82', 84'	Report

Ludogorets Arena, Razgrad
Attendance: 4,120
Referee: Pavel Orel (Czech Republic)

Ludogorets Razgrad won 5–1 on aggregate.

24 July 2019
18:00

Slovan Bratislava (Slovakia)	2–1	(Kosovo) Feronikeli
Nono 9'; Šporar 61' (pen.)	Report	M. Hoti 67'

Tehelné pole, Bratislava
Attendance: 7,150
Referee: Ioannis Papadopoulos (Greece)
30 July 2019
18:00

Feronikeli (Kosovo)	0–2	(Slovakia) Slovan Bratislava
	Report	De Marco 19'; Holman 54'

Fadil Vokrri Stadium, Pristina (Note: Feronikeli played their home match at Fadil Vokrri Stadium, Pristina, instead of their regular stadium Rexhep Rexhepi Stadium, Drenas which did not meet UEFA requirements.)
Attendance: 5,250
Referee: Yigal Frid (Israel)

Slovan Bratislava won 4–1 on aggregate.

23 July 2019
20:00

FC Santa Coloma (Andorra)	0–0	(Kazakhstan) Astana
	Report

Estadi Comunal, Andorra la Vella
Attendance: 382
Referee: Robert Hennessy (Republic of Ireland)
1 August 2019
16:00 (20:00 UTC+6)

Astana (Kazakhstan)	4–1	(Andorra) FC Santa Coloma
Sigurjónsson 24' (pen.); Tomasov 73', 79', 90+4'	Report	Pi 7'

Astana Arena, Nur-Sultan
Attendance: 16,103
Referee: Giorgi Kruashvili (Georgia)

Astana won 4–1 on aggregate.

23 July 2019
17:45 (18:45 UTC+1)

HB (Faroe Islands)	2–2	(Northern Ireland) Linfield
Justinussen 37' (pen.); Petersen 89'	Report	Waterworth 2', 88' (pen.)

Gundadalur, Tórshavn
Attendance: 751
Referee: Ádám Farkas (Hungary)
1 August 2019
20:45 (19:45 UTC+1)

Linfield (Northern Ireland)	1–0	(Faroe Islands) HB
Waterworth 20' (pen.)	Report

Windsor Park, Belfast
Attendance: 0 (Note: The match was played behind closed doors.)
Referee: Halil Umut Meler (Turkey)

Linfield won 3–2 on aggregate.

23 July 2019
17:55

Shkëndija (North Macedonia)	1–2	(Luxembourg) F91 Dudelange
A. Ibraimi 7' (pen.)	Report	Bettaieb 64'; Sinani 68' (pen.)

Toše Proeski Arena, Skopje (Note: Shkëndija played their home match at Toše Proeski Arena, Skopje, instead of their regular stadium Ecolog Arena, Tetovo which was undergoing renovation.)
Attendance: 2,602
Referee: Tore Hansen (Norway)
30 July 2019
17:55

F91 Dudelange (Luxembourg)	1–1	(North Macedonia) Shkëndija
Delgado 78'	Report	A. Ibraimi 90+2'

Stade Josy Barthel, Luxembourg City (Note: F91 Dudelange play their home matches at Stade Josy Barthel, Luxembourg City, instead of their regular stadium Stade Jos Nosbaum, Dudelange.)
Attendance: 1,022
Referee: Iwan Arwel Griffith (Wales)

F91 Dudelange won 3–2 on aggregate.

=== Main Path matches ===
25 July 2019
20:00

IFK Norrköping (Sweden)	2–0	(Latvia) Liepāja
Thern 1'; Hakšabanović 80'	Report

Nya Parken, Norrköping
Attendance: 5,440
Referee: Hüseyin Göçek (Turkey)
1 August 2019
19:00 (20:00 UTC+3)

Liepāja (Latvia)	0–1	(Sweden) IFK Norrköping
	Report	Hakšabanović 89'

Daugava Stadium, Liepāja
Attendance: 4,174
Referee: Marius Avram (Romania)

IFK Norrköping won 3–0 on aggregate.

25 July 2019
19:30 (20:30 UTC+3)

Hapoel Be'er Sheva (Israel)	2–0	(Kazakhstan) Kairat
Ramzi 10' (pen.); Shamir 63'	Report

Turner Stadium, Be'er Sheva
Attendance: 8,167
Referee: Ricardo de Burgos Bengoetxea (Spain)
1 August 2019
16:30 (20:30 UTC+6)

Kairat (Kazakhstan)	1–1	(Israel) Hapoel Be'er Sheva
Dugalić 40'	Report	Dugalić 63' (o.g.)

Almaty Central Stadium, Almaty
Attendance: 23,000
Referee: Ola Hobber Nilsen (Norway)

Hapoel Be'er Sheva won 3–1 on aggregate.

25 July 2019
19:00 (20:00 UTC+3)

Arsenal Tula (Russia)	0–1	(Azerbaijan) Neftçi
	Report	Dário 45+1'

Arsenal Stadium, Tula
Attendance: 16,720
Referee: Enea Jorgji (Albania)
1 August 2019
19:00 (21:00 UTC+4)

Neftçi (Azerbaijan)	3–0	(Russia) Arsenal Tula
Aliyev 49'; Dário 89' (pen.); Mbodj 90+3'	Report

Bakcell Arena, Baku
Attendance: 9,000
Referee: Alan Mario Sant (Malta)

Neftçi won 4–0 on aggregate.

25 July 2019
21:00

Espanyol (Spain)	4–0	(Iceland) Stjarnan
Ferreyra 49', 57'; Iglesias 60', 68'	Report

RCDE Stadium, Cornellà de Llobregat
Attendance: 19,122
Referee: Alain Durieux (Luxembourg)
1 August 2019
21:15 (19:15 UTC+0)

Stjarnan (Iceland)	1–3	(Spain) Espanyol
Sigurðsson 87'	Report	Pedrosa 5'; Iglesias 52'; Ferreyra 79'

Stjörnuvöllur, Garðabær
Attendance: 1,020
Referee: Dumitru Muntean (Moldova)

Espanyol won 7–1 on aggregate.

25 July 2019
20:30

DAC Dunajská Streda (Slovakia)	1–2	(Greece) Atromitos
K. Vida 35'	Report	Umbides 20'; Manousos 43'

MOL Aréna, Dunajská Streda
Attendance: 9,980
Referee: Bastian Dankert (Germany)
1 August 2019
19:00 (20:00 UTC+3)

Atromitos (Greece)	3–2	(Slovakia) DAC Dunajská Streda
Katranis 22'; Manousos 28' (pen.); Risvanis 76'	Report	Ramírez 53'; Kalmár 72' (pen.)

Peristeri Stadium, Peristeri
Attendance: 2,450
Referee: Mohammed Al-Hakim (Sweden)

Atromitos won 5–3 on aggregate.

25 July 2019
19:00

Haugesund (Norway)	2–0	(Austria) Sturm Graz
Krygård 51'; Sandberg 64'	Report

Haugesund Stadion, Haugesund
Attendance: 3,501
Referee: Donatas Rumšas (Lithuania)
1 August 2019
20:30

Sturm Graz (Austria)	2–1	(Norway) Haugesund
Sandberg 15' (o.g.); Ljubic 48'	Report	Krygård 68'

Liebenauer Stadium, Graz
Attendance: 2,000
Referee: Juri Frischer (Estonia)

Haugesund won 3–2 on aggregate.

25 July 2019
17:30 (18:30 UTC+3)

AEK Larnaca (Cyprus)	3–0	(Bulgaria) Levski Sofia
Giannou 67'; Raúl 70'; Hevel 75'	Report

AEK Arena – Georgios Karapatakis, Larnaca
Attendance: 3,177
Referee: Tiago Martins (Portugal)
1 August 2019
18:30 (19:30 UTC+3)

Levski Sofia (Bulgaria)	0–4	(Cyprus) AEK Larnaca
	Report	Trichkovski 8' (pen.), 29', 75', 82'

Stadion Vivacom Arena - Georgi Asparuhov, Sofia
Attendance: 550
Referee: Glenn Nyberg (Sweden)

AEK Larnaca won 7–0 on aggregate.

25 July 2019
21:00

Legia Warsaw (Poland)	1–0	(Finland) KuPS
Wieteska 9'	Report

Polish Army Stadium, Warsaw
Attendance: 11,678
Referee: Ivan Bebek (Croatia)
1 August 2019
18:00 (19:00 UTC+3)

KuPS (Finland)	0–0	(Poland) Legia Warsaw
	Report

Kuopio Football Stadium, Kuopio
Attendance: 3,200
Referee: Lawrence Visser (Belgium)

Legia Warsaw won 1–0 on aggregate.

25 July 2019
18:30

Utrecht (Netherlands)	1–1	(Bosnia and Herzegovina) Zrinjski Mostar
Kerk 61'	Report	Govedarica 34'

Stadion Galgenwaard, Utrecht
Attendance: 17,221
Referee: Aleksei Eskov (Russia)
1 August 2019
19:00

Zrinjski Mostar (Bosnia and Herzegovina)	2–1 (a.e.t.)	(Netherlands) Utrecht
Hadžić 65'; Mandić 111'	Report	Gustafson 45+1'

Stadion pod Bijelim Brijegom, Mostar
Attendance: 5,984
Referee: Antti Munukka (Finland)

Zrinjski Mostar won 3–2 on aggregate.

25 July 2019
15:30 (17:30 UTC+4)

Pyunik (Armenia)	2–1	(Czech Republic) Jablonec
Miranyan 6', 30'	Report	Doležal 53'

Gyumri City Stadium, Gyumri
Attendance: 1,940
Referee: Fedayi San (Switzerland)
1 August 2019
19:00

Jablonec (Czech Republic)	0–0	(Armenia) Pyunik
	Report

Stadion Střelnice, Jablonec nad Nisou
Attendance: 3,675
Referee: Sergey Lapochkin (Russia)

Pyunik won 2–1 on aggregate.

25 July 2019
19:00

Lechia Gdańsk (Poland)	2–1	(Denmark) Brøndby
Paixão 26' (pen.); Lipski 63'	Report	Hedlund 59'

Stadion Energa Gdańsk, Gdańsk
Attendance: 25,875
Referee: John Beaton (Scotland)
1 August 2019
19:30

Brøndby (Denmark)	4–1 (a.e.t.)	(Poland) Lechia Gdańsk
Arajuuri 15'; Wilczek 53'; Lindstrøm 94', 118'	Report	Paixão 67'

Brøndby Stadium, Brøndbyvester
Attendance: 16,426
Referee: Miroslav Zelinka (Czech Republic)

Brøndby won 5–3 on aggregate.

25 July 2019
20:00

MOL Fehérvár (Hungary)	1–0	(Liechtenstein) Vaduz
Stopira 5'	Report

Pancho Aréna, Felcsút
Attendance: 2,224
Referee: Kai Erik Steen (Norway)
1 August 2019
19:00

Vaduz (Liechtenstein)	2–0 (a.e.t.)	(Hungary) MOL Fehérvár
Gajić 61' (pen.); Coulibaly 100'	Report

Rheinpark Stadion, Vaduz
Attendance: 1,253
Referee: Manfredas Lukjančukas (Lithuania)

Vaduz won 2–1 on aggregate.

25 July 2019
17:00 (19:00 UTC+4)

Gabala (Azerbaijan)	0–2	(Georgia (country)) Dinamo Tbilisi
	Report	Kutalia 41'; Daffé 87'

Gabala City Stadium, Qabala
Attendance: 2,800
Referee: Nick Walsh (Scotland)
1 August 2019
19:00 (21:00 UTC+4)

Dinamo Tbilisi (Georgia (country))	3–0	(Azerbaijan) Gabala
Shengelia 68', 88'; Karikari 90+3'	Report

Boris Paichadze Dinamo Arena, Tbilisi
Attendance: 8,153
Referee: Petri Viljanen (Finland)

Dinamo Tbilisi won 5–0 on aggregate.

25 July 2019
19:00 (20:00 UTC+3)

Yeni Malatyaspor (Turkey)	2–2	(Slovenia) Olimpija Ljubljana
Mina 20'; Jahović 66' (pen.)	Report	Vukušić 13'; Savić 74'

Malatya Arena, Malatya
Attendance: 9,146
Referee: João Pinheiro (Portugal)
1 August 2019
20:00

Olimpija Ljubljana (Slovenia)	0–1	(Turkey) Yeni Malatyaspor
	Report	Jahović 77'

Stožice Stadium, Ljubljana
Attendance: 7,812
Referee: Filip Glova (Slovakia)

Yeni Malatyaspor won 3–2 on aggregate.

25 July 2019
19:00 (20:00 UTC+3)

Flora (Estonia)	1–2	(Germany) Eintracht Frankfurt
Ainsalu 34'	Report	Torró 24'; Joveljić 71'

A. Le Coq Arena, Tallinn
Attendance: 8,500
Referee: Ali Palabıyık (Turkey)
1 August 2019
20:30

Eintracht Frankfurt (Germany)	2–1	(Estonia) Flora
Paciência 37', 54' (pen.)	Report	Sinyavskiy 40'

Waldstadion, Frankfurt
Attendance: 48,000
Referee: Jørgen Daugbjerg Burchardt (Denmark)

Eintracht Frankfurt won 4–2 on aggregate.

25 July 2019
20:45

Domžale (Slovenia)	2–2	(Sweden) Malmö FF
Nicholson 37'; Gnezda Čerin 48'	Report	Bengtsson 42'; Antonsson 52'

Domžale Sports Park, Domžale
Attendance: 2,043
Referee: Michael Fabbri (Italy)
1 August 2019
19:00

Malmö FF (Sweden)	3–2	(Slovenia) Domžale
Lewicki 21'; Rosenberg 32'; Bengtsson 83'	Report	Nicholson 12'; Karič 45+1'

Eleda Stadion, Malmö
Attendance: 12,348
Referee: Amaury Delerue (France)

Malmö FF won 5–4 on aggregate.

25 July 2019
19:00

Molde (Norway)	0–0	(Serbia) Čukarički
	Report

Aker Stadion, Molde
Attendance: 3,198
Referee: Donald Robertson (Scotland)
31 July 2019
20:45

Čukarički (Serbia)	1–3	(Norway) Molde
Kajević 82'	Report	Omoijuanfo 4'; Eikrem 38'; Knudtzon 78'

Čukarički Stadium, Belgrade
Attendance: 3,014
Referee: Mykola Balakin (Ukraine)

Molde won 3–1 on aggregate.

25 July 2019
18:45 (20:45 UTC+4)

Chikhura Sachkhere (Georgia (country))	1–1	(Scotland) Aberdeen
Koripadze 41' (pen.)	Report	Cosgrove 68' (pen.)

Boris Paichadze Dinamo Arena, Tbilisi
Attendance: 3,218
Referee: Horațiu Feșnic (Romania)
1 August 2019
20:45 (19:45 UTC+1)

Aberdeen (Scotland)	5–0	(Georgia (country)) Chikhura Sachkhere
Cosgrove 9', 20', 80'; Leigh 58'; Wright 65'	Report

Pittodrie Stadium, Aberdeen
Attendance: 15,167
Referee: Rade Obrenovič (Slovenia)

Aberdeen won 6–1 on aggregate.

25 July 2019
20:30

Gent (Belgium)	6–3	(Romania) Viitorul Constanța
Asare 4'; Dejaegere 13'; Kubo 35', 45'; Yaremchuk 42' (pen.), 50'	Report	Mladen 21'; Țîru 56', 61'

Ghelamco Arena, Ghent
Attendance: 13,398
Referee: Aleksandar Stavrev (North Macedonia)
1 August 2019
17:00 (18:00 UTC+3)

Viitorul Constanța (Romania)	2–1	(Belgium) Gent
Iancu 47' (pen.), 61' (pen.)	Report	Yaremchuk 38'

Stadionul Viitorul, Ovidiu
Attendance: 4,088
Referee: José Luis Munuera Montero (Spain)

Gent won 7–5 on aggregate.

25 July 2019
20:45

Budućnost Podgorica (Montenegro)	1–3	(Ukraine) Zorya Luhansk
Perović 60'	Report	Hromov 15', 19'; Arveladze 82'

Podgorica City Stadium, Podgorica
Attendance: 5,500
Referee: Massimiliano Irrati (Italy)
1 August 2019
18:00 (19:00 UTC+3)

Zorya Luhansk (Ukraine)	1–0	(Montenegro) Budućnost Podgorica
Hromov 32'	Report

Slavutych-Arena, Zaporizhia (Note: Zorya Luhansk played their home matches at Slavutych-Arena, Zaporizhia, instead of their regular stadium Avanhard Stadium, Luhansk due to the war conditions in Eastern Ukraine.)
Attendance: 6,158
Referee: Neil Doyle (Republic of Ireland)

Zorya Luhansk won 4–1 on aggregate.

25 July 2019
19:30 (20:30 UTC+3)

CSKA Sofia (Bulgaria)	1–0	(Croatia) Osijek
Evandro 53'	Report

Stadion Balgarska Armia, Sofia
Attendance: 7,500
Referee: Paolo Valeri (Italy)
1 August 2019
20:45

Osijek (Croatia)	1–0 (a.e.t.)	(Bulgaria) CSKA Sofia
Majstorović 28'	Report
Penalties
Lyopa (penalty scored); Bočkaj (penalty missed); Škorić (penalty missed); Pilj (penalty scored); Marić (penalty scored)	3–4	(penalty scored) Rodrigues; (penalty scored) Carey; (penalty missed) Geferson; (penalty scored) Bodurov; (penalty scored) Sowe

Stadion Gradski vrt, Osijek
Attendance: 7,214
Referee: Robert Schörgenhofer (Austria)

1–1 on aggregate; CSKA Sofia won 4–3 on penalties.

25 July 2019
21:00

Torino (Italy)	3–0	(Hungary) Debrecen
Belotti 20' (pen.); Ansaldi 42'; Zaza 90+3'	Report

Stadio Giuseppe Moccagatta, Alessandria (Note: Torino played their second qualifying round home match at Stadio Giuseppe Moccagatta, Alessandria, instead of their regular stadium Stadio Olimpico Grande Torino, Turin.)
Attendance: 4,376
Referee: Jens Maae (Denmark)
1 August 2019
18:30

Debrecen (Hungary)	1–4	(Italy) Torino
Garba 52'	Report	Zaza 25'; Izzo 32'; Belotti 69'; Millico 90+2'

Nagyerdei Stadion, Debrecen
Attendance: 15,350
Referee: Fran Jović (Croatia)

Torino won 7–1 on aggregate.

25 July 2019
20:15

Luzern (Switzerland)	1–0	(Faroe Islands) KÍ
Schneuwly 90+3'	Report

Swissporarena, Lucerne
Attendance: 6,344
Referee: Halis Özkahya (Turkey)
1 August 2019
19:00 (18:00 UTC+1)

KÍ (Faroe Islands)	0–1	(Switzerland) Luzern
	Report	Voca 34'

Svangaskarð, Toftir
Attendance: 1,229
Referee: Martin Strömbergsson (Sweden)

Luzern won 2–0 on aggregate.

25 July 2019
20:45 (19:45 UTC+1)

Rangers (Scotland)	2–0	(Luxembourg) Progrès Niederkorn
Aribo 20'; Ojo 54'	Report

Ibrox Stadium, Glasgow
Attendance: 43,629
Referee: Espen Eskås (Norway)
1 August 2019
19:30

Progrès Niederkorn (Luxembourg)	0–0	(Scotland) Rangers
	Report

Stade Josy Barthel, Luxembourg City
Attendance: 3,867
Referee: Ivaylo Stoyanov (Bulgaria)

Rangers won 2–0 on aggregate.

25 July 2019
16:45 (17:45 UTC+3)

Ventspils (Latvia)	4–0	(Malta) Gżira United
Svārups 41'; Hélio 50'; Stuglis 83'; Tosin 87'	Report

Ventspils Olimpiskais Stadions, Ventspils
Attendance: 2,196
Referee: Dimitar Mečkarovski (North Macedonia)
1 August 2019
20:00

Gżira United (Malta)	2–2	(Latvia) Ventspils
Jefferson 15', 90+3'	Report	Kazačoks 72'; Serhiychuk 79'

Centenary Stadium, Ta' Qali
Attendance: 332
Referee: Thorvaldur Árnason (Iceland)

Ventspils won 6–2 on aggregate.

25 July 2019
20:45

Strasbourg (France)	3–1	(Israel) Maccabi Haifa
Ajorque 45' (pen.); Thomasson 47'; Martin 61'	Report	Plakuschenko 39'

Stade de la Meinau, Strasbourg
Attendance: 20,137
Referee: Kevin Blom (Netherlands)
1 August 2019
19:00 (20:00 UTC+3)

Maccabi Haifa (Israel)	2–1	(France) Strasbourg
Shua 25'; Rukavytsya 40'	Report	Ajorque 17'

Sammy Ofer Stadium, Haifa
Attendance: 23,038
Referee: Maurizio Mariani (Italy)

Strasbourg won 4–3 on aggregate.

25 July 2019
19:00

Mladá Boleslav (Czech Republic)	1–1	(Kazakhstan) Ordabasy
Komlichenko 45+2'	Report	Mehanović 21'

Lokotrans Aréna, Mladá Boleslav
Attendance: 3,721
Referee: Sergey Tsinkevich (Belarus)
1 August 2019
16:00 (20:00 UTC+6)

Ordabasy (Kazakhstan)	2–3	(Czech Republic) Mladá Boleslav
Shchotkin 45'; Diakate 56' (pen.)	Report	Matějovský 8'; Komlichenko 33' (pen.); Mešanović 47'

Kazhimukan Munaitpasov Stadium, Shymkent
Attendance: 17,000
Referee: Mads-Kristoffer Kristoffersen (Denmark)

Mladá Boleslav won 4–3 on aggregate.

25 July 2019
21:00 (20:00 UTC+1)

Shamrock Rovers (Republic of Ireland)	2–1	(Cyprus) Apollon Limassol
Grace 14'; Lopes 58'	Report	Papoulis 5'

Tallaght Stadium, Tallaght
Attendance: 5,396
Referee: Stephan Klossner (Switzerland)
1 August 2019
19:00 (20:00 UTC+3)

Apollon Limassol (Cyprus)	3–1 (a.e.t.)	(Republic of Ireland) Shamrock Rovers
Zelaya 18'; Szalai 64'; Sardinero 102'	Report	Greene 69'

GSP Stadium, Nicosia
Attendance: 2,987
Referee: Michael Tykgaard (Denmark)

Apollon Limassol won 4–3 on aggregate.

25 July 2019
20:30

AZ (Netherlands)	0–0	(Sweden) BK Häcken
	Report

AFAS Stadion, Alkmaar
Attendance: 11,492
Referee: Serhiy Boyko (Ukraine)
1 August 2019
18:30

BK Häcken (Sweden)	0–3	(Netherlands) AZ
	Report	Boadu 42'; Stengs 56'; Idrissi 67'

Bravida Arena, Gothenburg
Attendance: 3,845
Referee: Frank Schneider (France)

AZ won 3–0 on aggregate.

25 July 2019
19:00 (21:00 UTC+4)

Alashkert (Armenia)	0–3	(Romania) FCSB
	Report	Tănase 60'; Cristea 68'; Coman 82'

Yerevan Football Academy Stadium, Yerevan
Attendance: 1,420
Referee: Rob Harvey (Republic of Ireland)
1 August 2019
20:30 (21:30 UTC+3)

FCSB (Romania)	2–3	(Armenia) Alashkert
Tănase 10' (pen.); Coman 59'	Report	Marmentini 24', 28' (pen.); Thiago Galvão 45'

Stadionul Marin Anastasovici, Giurgiu
Attendance: 1,828
Referee: Peter Kralovič (Slovakia)

FCSB won 5–3 on aggregate.

25 July 2019
19:30 (20:30 UTC+3)

Lokomotiv Plovdiv (Bulgaria)	2–0	(Slovakia) Spartak Trnava
D. Iliev 39' (pen.), 61' (pen.)	Report

Stadion Lokomotiv, Plovdiv
Attendance: 5,900
Referee: Timotheos Christofi (Cyprus)
1 August 2019
20:45

Spartak Trnava (Slovakia)	3–1	(Bulgaria) Lokomotiv Plovdiv
Dangubić 16'; Mitrea 53' (pen.); Tavares 71'	Report	Ožbolt 74'

Anton Malatinský Stadium, Trnava
Attendance: 6,702
Referee: Erik Lambrechts (Belgium)

3–3 on aggregate; Lokomotiv Plovdiv won on away goals.

25 July 2019
20:45 (19:45 UTC+1)

Wolverhampton Wanderers (England)	2–0	(Northern Ireland) Crusaders
Jota 37'; Vinagre 90+3'	Report

Molineux Stadium, Wolverhampton
Attendance: 29,708
Referee: Kristoffer Karlsson (Sweden)
1 August 2019
21:00 (20:00 UTC+1)

Crusaders (Northern Ireland)	1–4	(England) Wolverhampton Wanderers
Bennett 13' (o.g.)	Report	Jiménez 15', 45'; Bennett 38'; Forsythe 77' (o.g.)

Seaview, Belfast
Attendance: 2,700
Referee: Nejc Kajtazovič (Slovenia)

Wolverhampton Wanderers won 6–1 on aggregate.

25 July 2019
20:30 (21:30 UTC+3)

Aris (Greece)	0–0	(Cyprus) AEL Limassol
	Report

Kleanthis Vikelidis Stadium, Thessaloniki
Attendance: 17,488
Referee: Stuart Attwell (England)
1 August 2019
19:00 (20:00 UTC+3)

AEL Limassol (Cyprus)	0–1	(Greece) Aris
	Report	Diguiny 14' (pen.)

AEK Arena – Georgios Karapatakis, Larnaca (Note: AEL Limassol played their home match at AEK Arena – Georgios Karapatakis, Larnaca, instead of their regular stadium Tsirio Stadium, Limassol.)
Attendance: 3,346
Referee: Jorge Sousa (Portugal)

Aris won 1–0 on aggregate.

25 July 2019
20:30

Jeunesse Esch (Luxembourg)	0–1	(Portugal) Vitória de Guimarães
	Report	Amoah 90+4'

Stade Josy Barthel, Luxembourg City (Note: Jeunesse Esch played their second qualifying round home match at Stade Josy Barthel, Luxembourg City, instead of their regular stadium Stade de la Frontière, Esch-sur-Alzette.)
Attendance: 3,617
Referee: Bojan Pandžić (Sweden)
1 August 2019
21:00 (20:00 UTC+1)

Vitória de Guimarães (Portugal)	4–0	(Luxembourg) Jeunesse Esch
Tapsoba 14', 88' (pen.); Guedes 63'; Teixeira 90+3'	Report

Estádio D. Afonso Henriques, Guimarães
Attendance: 16,352
Referee: Vitali Meshkov (Russia)

Vitória de Guimarães won 5–0 on aggregate.

25 July 2019
18:55

Honvéd (Hungary)	0–0	(Romania) Universitatea Craiova
	Report

ETO Park, Győr
Attendance: 2,720
Referee: Kevin Clancy (Scotland)
1 August 2019
18:15 (19:15 UTC+3)

Universitatea Craiova (Romania)	0–0 (a.e.t.)	(Hungary) Honvéd
	Report
Penalties
Ioniță (penalty scored); Fortes (penalty scored); Cicâldău (penalty scored)	3–1	(penalty missed) Kamber; (penalty missed) Batik; (penalty scored) Ngog; (penalty missed) Banó-Szabó

Stadionul Ion Oblemenco, Craiova
Attendance: 22,134
Referee: Arnold Hunter (Northern Ireland)

0–0 on aggregate; Universitatea Craiova won 3–1 on penalties.

25 July 2019
19:00 (20:00 UTC+3)

Shakhtyor Soligorsk (Belarus)	2–0	(Denmark) Esbjerg
Bakaj 5'; Rybak 55'	Report

Stroitel Stadium, Salihorsk
Attendance: 3,050
Referee: Mete Kalkavan (Turkey)
1 August 2019
19:45

Esbjerg (Denmark)	0–0	(Belarus) Shakhtyor Soligorsk
	Report

Esbjerg Stadium, Esbjerg
Attendance: 4,517
Referee: Duje Strukan (Croatia)

Shakhtyor Soligorsk won 2–0 on aggregate.

25 July 2019
19:30 (18:30 UTC+1)

Connah's Quay Nomads (Wales)	0–1	(Serbia) Partizan
	Report	Šćekić 62'

Belle Vue, Rhyl
Attendance: 829
Referee: Michal Očenáš (Slovakia)
1 August 2019
21:00

Partizan (Serbia)	3–0	(Wales) Connah's Quay Nomads
Tošić 54'; Ožegović 70'; F. Stevanović 73'	Report

Partizan Stadium, Belgrade
Attendance: 8,200
Referee: Luís Godinho (Portugal)

Partizan won 4–0 on aggregate.
