= Battistini =

Battistini is an Italian surname. Notable people with the surname include:

- Alfredo Battistini (1953–2008), Italian-Swiss sculptor, illustrator and athlete
- Dillon Battistini (born 1977), English racing driver
- Graziano Battistini (1936–1994), Italian cyclist
- Graziano Battistini, (born 1970), retired Italian football goalkeeper
- Manuel Battistini (born 1994), Sammarinese footballer
- Mattia Battistini (1856–1928), Italian opera singer
- Maurizio Battistini (born 1957), Sammarinese alpine skier
- Michael Battistini (born 1996), Sammarinese footballer
- Sergio Battistini (born 1963), Italian footballer

== See also ==
- Battistini (Rome Metro), underground station in Rome, Italy
