= Michael Battistini =

Sammarinese footballer

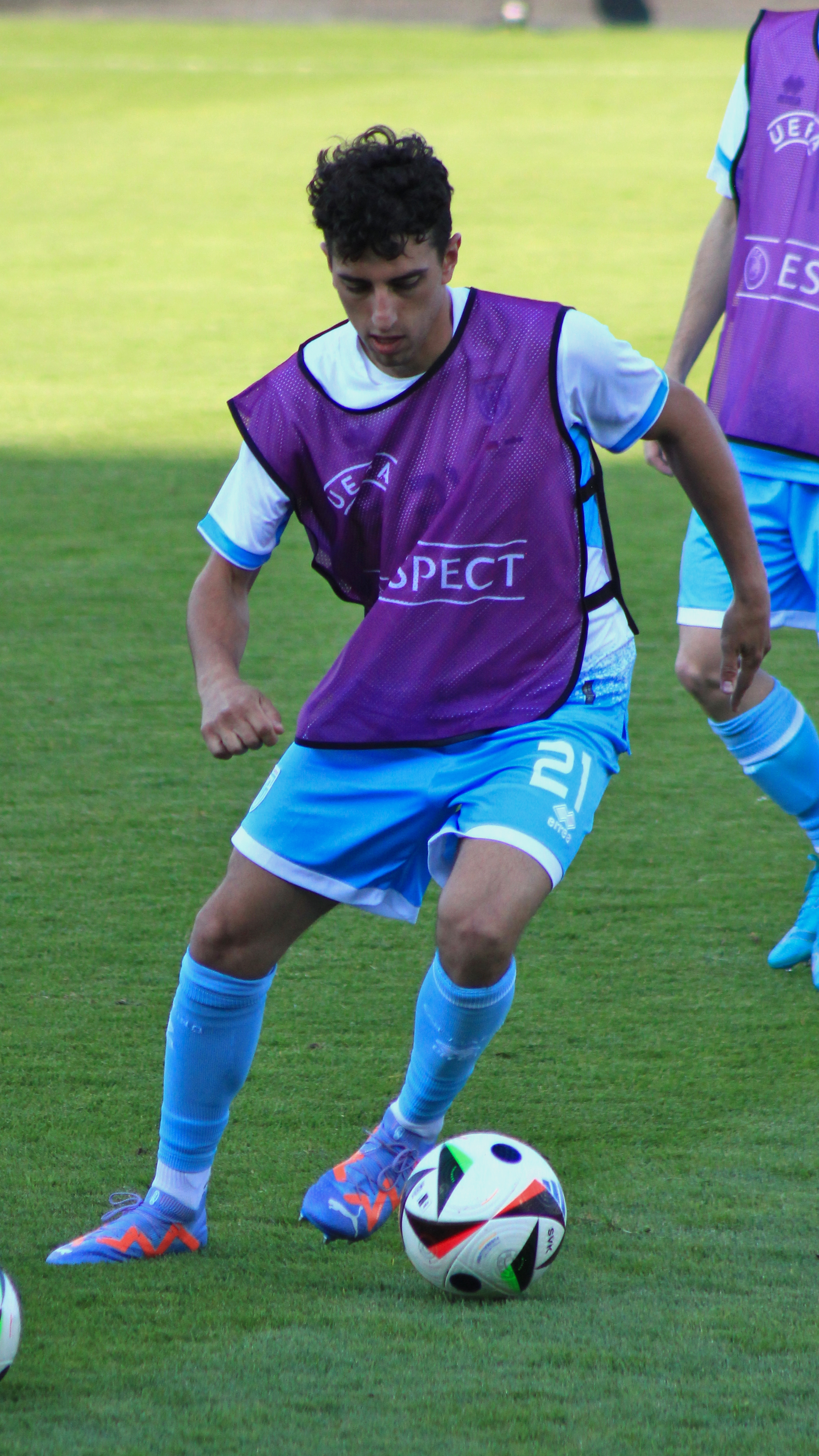
- Battistini with San Marino against Slovakia (2024)

Personal information
- Date of birth: 8 October 1996 (age 30)
- Place of birth: San Marino
- Position: Right back

Youth career
- –2015: San Marino Calcio

Senior career*
Years	Team	Apps	(Gls)
2016–2017	Juvenes/Dogana	13	(1)
2017–2018	Torconca		
2018–2019	Libertas	22	(2)
2019–2024	Tre Penne	105	(1)
2024–2025	Libertas	11	(0)

International career^{‡}
2014	San Marino U17	2	(0)
2014–2015	San Marino U19	3	(0)
2015–2018	San Marino U21	14	(0)
2016	San Marino B	5	(1)
2017–2024	San Marino	31	(0)
- * Club domestic league appearances and goals as of 5 June 2026 ‡ National team caps and goals as of 19 November 2024

Michael Battistini (born 8 October 1996) is a Sammarinese footballer who last played as a right back for Campionato Sammarinese di Calcio club Libertas in San Marino.

== International career ==
Battistini has represented San Marino at under 17, 19, 21 and senior level. He made his full international debut in a 2-0 loss to Moldova, coming on as a substitute for Luca Tosi.

He also represented a San Marino XI at the 2017 UEFA Regions' Cup, scoring in a 4-0 win over South Wales.

== Career statistics ==
=== Club ===
As of 18 July 2018.

Club	Season	League			Cup		Continental		Other		Total	
Club	Season	Division	Apps	Goals	Apps	Goals	Apps	Goals	Apps	Goals	Apps	Goals
Juvenes/Dogana	2016–17	Campionato Sammarinese di Calcio	13	1	4 (Note: Appearances in the Coppa Titano)	0	–		0	0	17	1
Libertas	2018–19	Campionato Sammarinese di Calcio	12	2	0	0	–		0	0	12	2
Tre Penne	2019–20	Campionato Sammarinese di Calcio	0	0	0	0	–		1 (Note: Appearances in the 2019-20 Europa League Qualifiers)	0	1	0
Career total			25	3	4	0	0	0	1	0	29	3

=== International ===
As of matches played 18 November 2024

National team	Year	Apps	Goals
San Marino	2017	5	0
San Marino	2018	0	0
San Marino	2019	1	0
San Marino	2020	3	0
San Marino	2021	2	0
San Marino	2022	8	0
San Marino	2023	6	0
San Marino	2024	6	0
Total		31	0

== Personal life ==
Battistini works by day as a metal mechanic.
