= Lunadei =

Lunadei is an Italian surname. Notable people with the surname include:

- Gianni Lunadei (1938–1998), Italian-born Argentine actor and comedian
- Lorenzo Lunadei (born 1997), Sammarinese footballer
