= Lorenzo Lunadei =

Sammarinese footballer (born 1997)

Personal information
- Date of birth: 12 July 1997 (age 29)
- Position: Midfielder

Team information
- Current team: La Fiorita
- Number: 8

Youth career
- 2014–2015: FYA Riccione

Senior career*
Years	Team	Apps	(Gls)
2015–2017	FYA Riccione	60	(3)
2017	La Fiorita	4	(0)
2017–2021	FYA Riccione	0	(0)
2021	San Giovanni	7	(1)
2021–	La Fiorita	126	(2)

International career^{‡}
2017–	San Marino U21	7	(0)
2017–	San Marino	35	(0)
Medal record
La Fiorita
Winner	Campionato Sammarinese di Calcio	2016–17
Runner-up	Coppa Titano	2016–17
- * Club domestic league appearances and goals as of 5 June 2026 ‡ National team caps and goals as of 17 November 2023

Lorenzo Lunadei (born 12 July 1997) is a Sammarinese footballer who currently plays as a midfielder for La Fiorita.

== Personal life ==
Lunadei works as a second-hand car dealer in Autocom Riccione while also playing football.

== Club career ==
Lunadei started his career with the FYA Riccione youth academy, where he made 60 appearances, before joining Campionato Sammarinese di Calcio side La Fiorita in 2017.

== International career ==
Lunadei made his senior international debut against Andorra in a 2-0 loss. He was replaced at half time by Luca Tosi. He has also been called up to the San Marino under 21 side.

== Career statistics ==
=== Club ===
As of 18 July 2018.

Club	Season	League			Cup		Continental		Other		Total	
Club	Season	Division	Apps	Goals	Apps	Goals	Apps	Goals	Apps	Goals	Apps	Goals
La Fiorita	2016–17	Campionato Sammarinese di Calcio	4	0	2 (Note: Appearances in the Coppa Titano)	0	–		0	0	6	0
La Fiorita	2017–18	Campionato Sammarinese di Calcio	0	0	0	0	1 (Note: Appearances in 2017–18 UEFA Champions League qualifying)	0	0	0	1	0
Career total			4	0	2	0	1	0	0	0	7	0

=== International ===
As of matches played 17 November 2023.

National team	Year	Apps	Goals
San Marino	2017	1	0
San Marino	2018	4	0
San Marino	2019	8	0
San Marino	2020	4	0
San Marino	2021	9	0
San Marino	2022	4	0
San Marino	2023	5	0
Total		35	0
