= 2019–20 UEFA Europa League qualifying =

Union of European Football Associations matches

The 2019–20 UEFA Europa League qualifying phase and play-off round began on 27 June and ended on 29 August 2019.

A total of 178 teams compete in the qualifying system of the 2019–20 UEFA Europa League, which includes the qualifying phase and the play-off round, with 35 teams in Champions Path and 143 teams in Main Path. The 21 winners in the play-off round (8 from Champions Path, 13 from Main Path) advance to the group stage, to join the 17 teams that enter in the group stage, the 6 losers of the Champions League play-off round (4 from Champions Path, 2 from League Path), and the 4 League Path losers of the Champions League third qualifying round.

== Teams ==
=== Champions Path ===
The Champions Path includes all league champions which are eliminated from the Champions Path qualifying phase of the Champions League, and consists of the following rounds:

- Second qualifying round (18 teams): 18 teams which enter in this round (3 losers of the Champions League preliminary round and 15 of the 16 losers of the Champions League first qualifying round).
- Third qualifying round (20 teams): 11 teams which enter in this round (1 loser of the Champions League first qualifying round which receives a bye and 10 losers of the Champions League second qualifying round), and 9 winners of the second qualifying round.
- Play-off round (16 teams): 6 teams which enter in this round (losers of the Champions League third qualifying round), and 10 winners of the third qualifying round.

Below are the participating teams of the Champions Path (with their 2019 UEFA club coefficients), grouped by their starting rounds.

Key to colours
Winners of play-off round advance to group stage

Play-off round
Team	Coeff.
(Scotland) Celtic	31.000
(Denmark) Copenhagen	31.000
(Greece) PAOK	23.500
(Azerbaijan) Qarabağ	22.000
(Slovenia) Maribor	18.500
(Hungary) Ferencváros	3.500

Third qualifying round
Team	Coeff.
(Belarus) BATE Borisov	27.500
(Israel) Maccabi Tel Aviv	16.000
(Finland) HJK	9.000
(Republic of Ireland) Dundalk	7.000
(Wales) The New Saints	6.000
(Sweden) AIK	5.500
(Malta) Valletta	4.250
(Bosnia and Herzegovina) Sarajevo	4.250
(Estonia) Nõmme Kalju	3.500
(Montenegro) Sutjeska	3.000
(Georgia (country)) Saburtalo Tbilisi	0.950

Second qualifying round
Team	Coeff.
(Kazakhstan) Astana	27.500
(Bulgaria) Ludogorets Razgrad	27.000
(Moldova) Sheriff Tiraspol	12.250
(Luxembourg) F91 Dudelange	6.250
(North Macedonia) Shkëndija	6.000
(Slovakia) Slovan Bratislava	6.000
(Lithuania) Sūduva	4.250
(Gibraltar) Lincoln Red Imps	4.250
(Andorra) FC Santa Coloma	4.000
(Poland) Piast Gliwice	3.850
(Albania) Partizani	3.000
(Iceland) Valur	2.750
(Northern Ireland) Linfield	2.250
(Faroe Islands) HB	1.500
(Latvia) Riga	1.125
Ararat-Armenia	1.050
(San Marino) Tre Penne	0.750
(Kosovo) Feronikeli	0.500

Notes

1. ^{Q3} Losers of Champions League third qualifying round (Champions Path).
2. ^{Q2} Losers of Champions League second qualifying round (Champions Path).
3. ^{Q1 Bye} Losers of Champions League first qualifying round which receive a bye to the Europa League third qualifying round.
4. ^{Q1} Losers of Champions League first qualifying round.
5. ^{PR F} Losers of Champions League preliminary round final.
6. ^{PR SF} Losers of Champions League preliminary round semi-finals.

=== Main Path ===
The Main Path includes all cup winners and league non-champions which do not qualify directly for the group stage, and consists of the following rounds:

- Preliminary round (14 teams): 14 teams which enter in this round.
- First qualifying round (94 teams): 87 teams which enter in this round, and 7 winners of the preliminary round.
- Second qualifying round (74 teams): 27 teams which enter in this round, and 47 winners of the first qualifying round.
- Third qualifying round (52 teams): 15 teams which enter in this round (including 2 League Path losers of the Champions League second qualifying round), and 37 winners of the second qualifying round.
- Play-off round (26 teams): 26 winners of the third qualifying round.

Below are the participating teams of the Main Path (with their 2019 UEFA club coefficients), grouped by their starting rounds.

Key to colours
Winners of play-off round advance to group stage

Third qualifying round
Team	Coeff.
(Netherlands) PSV Eindhoven	37.000
(Czech Republic) Sparta Prague	35.500
(Czech Republic) Viktoria Plzeň	33.000
(Portugal) Braga	31.000
(Netherlands) Feyenoord	22.000
(Russia) Spartak Moscow	16.000
(Greece) AEK Athens	14.000
(Denmark) Midtjylland	14.000
(Croatia) Rijeka	13.500
Austria Wien	8.000
(Turkey) Trabzonspor	8.000
(Belgium) Antwerp	7.980
(Ukraine) Mariupol	7.780
(Switzerland) Thun	5.380
(Israel) Bnei Yehuda	3.725

Second qualifying round
Team	Coeff.
(Belgium) Gent	29.500
(Germany) Eintracht Frankfurt	24.000
(Spain) Espanyol	20.713
(Serbia) Partizan	18.000
(England) Wolverhampton Wanderers	17.092
(Italy) Torino	14.945
(France) Strasbourg	11.699
(Ukraine) Zorya Luhansk	11.500
(Netherlands) AZ	10.500
(Russia) Arsenal Tula	10.109
(Portugal) Vitória de Guimarães	9.646
(Turkey) Yeni Malatyaspor	6.920
(Netherlands) Utrecht	6.486
(Austria) Sturm Graz	6.250
(Azerbaijan) Gabala	6.250
(Czech Republic) Jablonec	5.735
(Czech Republic) Mladá Boleslav	5.735
(Greece) Atromitos	5.520
(Greece) Aris	5.520
(Croatia) Osijek	5.475
(Denmark) Esbjerg	5.405
(Switzerland) Luzern	5.380
(Cyprus) AEL Limassol	4.985
(Sweden) BK Häcken	4.180
(Romania) Viitorul Constanța	4.000
(Poland) Lechia Gdańsk	3.850
(Bulgaria) Lokomotiv Plovdiv	3.500

First qualifying round
Team	Coeff.
(Poland) Legia Warsaw	24.500
(Romania) FCSB	23.000
(Sweden) Malmö FF	20.000
(Norway) Molde	13.500
(Cyprus) Apollon Limassol	12.000
(Israel) Hapoel Be'er Sheva	12.000
(Hungary) MOL Fehérvár	9.000
(Belarus) Dinamo Minsk	9.000
(Slovakia) Spartak Trnava	8.500
(Cyprus) AEK Larnaca	8.000
(Croatia) Hajduk Split	8.000
(Denmark) Brøndby	7.500
(Lithuania) Žalgiris	6.000
(Scotland) Aberdeen	5.500
(Scotland) Rangers	5.250
(Bosnia and Herzegovina) Zrinjski Mostar	5.250
(Kazakhstan) Kairat	5.000
(Albania) Kukësi	4.750
(Armenia) Alashkert	4.500
(Serbia) Radnički Niš	4.450
(Serbia) Čukarički	4.450
(Scotland) Kilmarnock	4.425
(Belarus) Shakhtyor Soligorsk	4.375
(Belarus) Vitebsk	4.375
(Slovenia) Domžale	4.250
(Northern Ireland) Crusaders	4.250
(Latvia) Ventspils	4.250
(Iceland) Stjarnan	4.250
(Sweden) IFK Norrköping	4.180
(Norway) Haugesund	4.040
(Norway) Brann	4.040
(Luxembourg) Fola Esch	4.000
(Liechtenstein) Vaduz	4.000
(Kazakhstan) Tobol	3.850
(Kazakhstan) Ordabasy	3.850
(Poland) Cracovia	3.850
(Azerbaijan) Neftçi	3.800
(Azerbaijan) Sabail	3.800
(Slovenia) Olimpija Ljubljana	3.750
(Republic of Ireland) Cork City	3.750
(Armenia) Pyunik	3.750
(Georgia (country)) Dinamo Tbilisi	3.750
(Israel) Maccabi Haifa	3.725
(Bulgaria) CSKA Sofia	3.500
(Bulgaria) Levski Sofia	3.500
(Lithuania) Riteriai	3.250
(Montenegro) Budućnost Podgorica	3.250
(Estonia) FCI Levadia	3.250
(Romania) Universitatea Craiova	3.190
(Slovakia) DAC Dunajská Streda	3.125
(Slovakia) Ružomberok	3.125
(Faroe Islands) B36	3.000
(Georgia (country)) Chikhura Sachkhere	3.000
(Montenegro) Titograd Podgorica	3.000
(Hungary) Debrecen	3.000
(Slovenia) Mura	3.000
(Georgia (country)) Torpedo Kutaisi	2.750
(Moldova) Milsami Orhei	2.750
(Hungary) Honvéd	2.500
(Estonia) Flora	2.500
(Latvia) Liepāja	2.500
(Malta) Hibernians	2.500
(Iceland) KR	2.500
(Malta) Balzan	2.250
(Albania) Laçi	2.250
(Republic of Ireland) Shamrock Rovers	2.250
(Bosnia and Herzegovina) Široki Brijeg	2.250
(Wales) Connah's Quay Nomads	1.750
(Armenia) Banants	1.750
(Republic of Ireland) St Patrick's Athletic	1.750
(North Macedonia) Shkupi	1.600
(North Macedonia) Akademija Pandev	1.600
(North Macedonia) Makedonija GP	1.600
(Moldova) Petrocub Hîncești	1.550
(Moldova) Speranța Nisporeni	1.550
(Albania) Teuta	1.500
(Finland) KuPS	1.455
(Finland) RoPS	1.455
(Finland) Inter Turku	1.455
(Iceland) Breiðablik	1.450
(Bosnia and Herzegovina) Radnik Bijeljina	1.425
(Lithuania) Kauno Žalgiris	1.350
(Latvia) RFS	1.125
(Luxembourg) Jeunesse Esch	1.100
(Malta) Gżira United	1.025
(Estonia) Narva Trans	1.000
(Montenegro) Zeta	0.825

Preliminary round
Team	Coeff.
(San Marino) La Fiorita	3.000
(Luxembourg) Progrès Niederkorn	2.750
(Northern Ireland) Cliftonville	2.500
(Gibraltar) Europa	2.000
(Faroe Islands) NSÍ	1.750
(Faroe Islands) KÍ	1.250
(Kosovo) Prishtina	1.250
(Andorra) Sant Julià	1.250
(Andorra) Engordany	1.000
(San Marino) Tre Fiori	1.000
(Wales) Barry Town United	0.825
(Wales) Cardiff Metropolitan University	0.825
(Gibraltar) St Joseph's	0.800
(Northern Ireland) Ballymena United	0.775

Notes

1. ^{CL} Losers of Champions League second qualifying round (League Path).

== Format ==
Each tie is played over two legs, with each team playing one leg at home. The team that scores more goals on aggregate over the two legs advance to the next round. If the aggregate score is level, the away goals rule is applied, i.e. the team that scores more goals away from home over the two legs advances. If away goals are also equal, then extra time is played. The away goals rule is again applied after extra time, i.e. if there are goals scored during extra time and the aggregate score is still level, the visiting team advances by virtue of more away goals scored. If no goals are scored during extra time, the tie is decided by penalty shoot-out.

For the Champions Path, in the draws for each round, teams (whose identity is not known at the time of the draws) are divided into seeded and unseeded pots, which may contain different numbers of teams, based on the following principles:

- In the second qualifying round draw, 15 of the 16 losers of the Champions League first qualifying round (excluding 1 team which receives a bye to the third qualifying round as decided by an additional draw held after the Champions League first qualifying round draw) are seeded, and the three losers of the Champions League preliminary round are unseeded.
- In the third qualifying round draw, the ten losers of the Champions League second qualifying round are seeded, and the loser of the first qualifying round which receives a bye (whose identity is known at the time of the draw) and the nine winners of the second qualifying round are unseeded.
- In the play-off round draw, the six losers of the Champions League third qualifying round are seeded, and the ten winners of the third qualifying round are unseeded.

In the beginning of the draws, a seeded team is drawn against an unseeded team, with the order of legs in each tie decided by draw, until one of the pots is empty. Afterwards, the remaining teams from the non-empty pot are drawn against each other, with the order of legs in each tie decided by draw.

For the Main Path, in the draws for each round, teams are seeded based on their UEFA club coefficients at the beginning of the season, with the teams divided into seeded and unseeded pots containing the same number of teams. A seeded team is drawn against an unseeded team, with the order of legs in each tie decided by draw. As the identity of the winners of the previous round is not known at the time of the draws, the seeding is carried out under the assumption that the team with the higher coefficient of an undecided tie advances to this round, which means if the team with the lower coefficient is to advance, it simply take the seeding of its opponent.

Prior to the draws, UEFA may form "groups" in accordance with the principles set by the Club Competitions Committee, but they are purely for convenience of the draw and do not resemble any real groupings in the sense of the competition. Teams from the same association or from associations with political conflicts as decided by UEFA may not be drawn into the same tie. After the draws, the order of legs of a tie may be reversed by UEFA due to scheduling or venue conflicts.

== Schedule ==
The schedule was as follows (all draws were held at the UEFA headquarters in Nyon, Switzerland).

Qualifying phase and play-off round schedule
Round	Draw date	First leg	Second leg
Preliminary round	11 June 2019	27 June 2019	4 July 2019
First qualifying round	18 June 2019	11 July 2019	18 July 2019
Second qualifying round	19 June 2019	25 July 2019	1 August 2019
Third qualifying round	22 July 2019	8 August 2019	15 August 2019
Play-off round	5 August 2019	22 August 2019	29 August 2019

Matches may also be played on Tuesdays or Wednesdays instead of the regular Thursdays due to scheduling conflicts.

== Preliminary round ==
The draw for the preliminary round was held on 11 June 2019.

=== Seeding ===
A total of 14 teams were involved in the preliminary round draw. Seven teams were seeded and seven teams were unseeded. Teams from the same association could not be drawn into the same tie, and if such a pairing was drawn or was set to be drawn in the final tie, the second team drawn in the current tie was moved to the next tie.

Seeded	Unseeded
(San Marino) La Fiorita; (Luxembourg) Progrès Niederkorn; (Northern Ireland) Cliftonville; (Gibraltar) Europa; (Faroe Islands) NSÍ; (Faroe Islands) KÍ; (Kosovo) Prishtina	(Andorra) Sant Julià; (Andorra) Engordany; (San Marino) Tre Fiori; (Wales) Barry Town United; (Wales) Cardiff Metropolitan University; (Gibraltar) St Joseph's; (Northern Ireland) Ballymena United

=== Summary ===
The first legs were played on 27 June, and the second legs on 2 and 4 July 2019.

Team 1	Agg.	Team 2	1st leg	2nd leg
Progrès Niederkorn (Luxembourg)	2–2 (a)	(Wales) Cardiff Metropolitan University	1–0	1–2
La Fiorita (San Marino)	1–3	(Andorra) Engordany	0–1	1–2
Sant Julià (Andorra)	3–6	(Gibraltar) Europa	3–2	0–4
Ballymena United (Northern Ireland)	2–0	(Faroe Islands) NSÍ	2–0	0–0
Prishtina (Kosovo)	1–3	(Gibraltar) St Joseph's	1–1	0–2
KÍ (Faroe Islands)	9–1 (Note: Order of legs reversed after original draw.)	(San Marino) Tre Fiori	5–1	4–0
Barry Town United (Wales)	0–4	(Northern Ireland) Cliftonville	0–0	0–4

== First qualifying round ==
The draw for the first qualifying round was held on 18 June 2019.

=== Seeding ===
A total of 94 teams were involved in the first qualifying round draw: 87 teams entering in this round, and the seven winners of the preliminary round. They were divided into nine groups: seven groups of ten teams, where five teams were seeded and five teams were unseeded; and two groups of twelve teams, where six teams were seeded and six teams were unseeded. Numbers were pre-assigned for each team by UEFA, with the draw held in two runs, one for Groups 1–7 with ten teams and one for Groups 8–9 with twelve teams.

Group 1		Group 2		Group 3	
Seeded	Unseeded	Seeded	Unseeded	Seeded	Unseeded
(Sweden) Malmö FF (5); (Scotland) Kilmarnock (2); (Belarus) Vitebsk (4); (Norway) Brann (3); (Liechtenstein) Vaduz (1)	(Republic of Ireland) Shamrock Rovers (6); (Wales) Connah's Quay Nomads (8); (Northern Ireland) Ballymena United (7); (Finland) KuPS (9); (Iceland) Breiðablik (10)	(Poland) Legia Warsaw (2); (Croatia) Hajduk Split (1); (Serbia) Radnički Niš (3); (Kazakhstan) Ordabasy (5); (Bulgaria) CSKA Sofia (4)	(Montenegro) Titograd Podgorica (9); (Georgia (country)) Torpedo Kutaisi (7); (Estonia) Flora (6); (Gibraltar) Europa (8); (Malta) Gżira United (10)	(Romania) FCSB (3); (Albania) Kukësi (2); (Serbia) Čukarički (4); (Kazakhstan) Tobol (1); (Israel) Maccabi Haifa (5)	(Hungary) Debrecen (8); (Slovenia) Mura (7); (Moldova) Milsami Orhei (6); (Armenia) Banants (9); (Luxembourg) Jeunesse Esch (10)
Group 4		Group 5		Group 6	
Seeded	Unseeded	Seeded	Unseeded	Seeded	Unseeded
(Norway) Molde (4); (Denmark) Brøndby (2); (Scotland) Rangers (1); (Northern Ireland) Crusaders (5); (Republic of Ireland) Cork City (3)	(Faroe Islands) B36 (7); (Luxembourg) Progrès Niederkorn (6); (Iceland) KR (9); (Finland) Inter Turku (8); (Gibraltar) St Joseph's (10)	(Hungary) MOL Fehérvár (1); (Bosnia and Herzegovina) Zrinjski Mostar (2); (Belarus) Shakhtyor Soligorsk (3); (Azerbaijan) Neftçi (4); (Bulgaria) Levski Sofia (5)	(Slovakia) Ružomberok (7); (Malta) Hibernians (6); (North Macedonia) Akademija Pandev (8); (Moldova) Speranța Nisporeni (9); (Montenegro) Zeta (10)	(Slovakia) Spartak Trnava (1); (Lithuania) Žalgiris (2); (Armenia) Alashkert (4); (Luxembourg) Fola Esch (3); (Slovenia) Olimpija Ljubljana (5)	(Georgia (country)) Chikhura Sachkhere (6); (Hungary) Honvéd (8); (North Macedonia) Makedonija GP (9); (Bosnia and Herzegovina) Radnik Bijeljina (10); (Latvia) RFS (7)
Group 7		Group 8		Group 9	
Seeded	Unseeded	Seeded	Unseeded	Seeded	Unseeded
(Cyprus) Apollon Limassol (1); (Kazakhstan) Kairat (2); (Latvia) Ventspils (3); (Poland) Cracovia (4); (Georgia (country)) Dinamo Tbilisi (5)	(Slovakia) DAC Dunajská Streda (9); (Andorra) Engordany (7); (Bosnia and Herzegovina) Široki Brijeg (8); (Albania) Teuta (6); (Lithuania) Kauno Žalgiris (10)	(Belarus) Dinamo Minsk (5); (Scotland) Aberdeen (2); (Iceland) Stjarnan (3); (Sweden) IFK Norrköping (4); (Norway) Haugesund (1); (Lithuania) Riteriai (6)	(Estonia) FCI Levadia (8); (Latvia) Liepāja (7); (Northern Ireland) Cliftonville (9); (Republic of Ireland) St Patrick's Athletic (10); (Finland) RoPS (11); (Faroe Islands) KÍ (12)	(Israel) Hapoel Be'er Sheva (1); (Cyprus) AEK Larnaca (2); (Slovenia) Domžale (3); (Azerbaijan) Sabail (5); (Armenia) Pyunik (4); (Montenegro) Budućnost Podgorica (6)	(Romania) Universitatea Craiova (7); (Malta) Balzan (8); (Albania) Laçi (9); (North Macedonia) Shkupi (10); (Moldova) Petrocub Hîncești (11); (Estonia) Narva Trans (12)

Notes

1. ^{†} Winners of the preliminary round. Teams in italics defeated a team with a higher coefficient, thus effectively taking the coefficient of their opponent in the draw.

=== Summary ===
The first legs were played on 9, 10 and 11 July, and the second legs on 16, 17 and 18 July 2019.

Team 1	Agg.	Team 2	1st leg	2nd leg
Malmö FF (Sweden)	11–0	(Northern Ireland) Ballymena United	7–0	4–0
Connah's Quay Nomads (Wales)	3–2	(Scotland) Kilmarnock	1–2	2–0
KuPS (Finland)	3–1 (Note: Order of legs reversed after original draw.)	(Belarus) Vitebsk	2–0	1–1
Breiðablik (Iceland)	1–2	(Liechtenstein) Vaduz	0–0	1–2
Brann (Norway)	3–4	(Republic of Ireland) Shamrock Rovers	2–2	1–2
Ordabasy (Kazakhstan)	3–0	(Georgia (country)) Torpedo Kutaisi	1–0	2–0
Europa (Gibraltar)	0–3	(Poland) Legia Warsaw	0–0	0–3
CSKA Sofia (Bulgaria)	4–0	(Montenegro) Titograd Podgorica	4–0	0–0
Gżira United (Malta)	3–3 (a)	(Croatia) Hajduk Split	0–2	3–1
Flora (Estonia)	4–2	(Serbia) Radnički Niš	2–0	2–2
Maccabi Haifa (Israel)	5–2	(Slovenia) Mura	2–0	3–2
Debrecen (Hungary)	4–1	(Albania) Kukësi	3–0	1–1
Čukarički (Serbia)	8–0	(Armenia) Banants	3–0	5–0
Jeunesse Esch (Luxembourg)	1–1 (a)	(Kazakhstan) Tobol	0–0	1–1
FCSB (Romania)	4–1	(Moldova) Milsami Orhei	2–0	2–1
Crusaders (Northern Ireland)	5–2	(Faroe Islands) B36	2–0	3–2
Brøndby (Denmark)	4–3	(Finland) Inter Turku	4–1	0–2
Molde (Norway)	7–1	(Iceland) KR	7–1	0–0
St Joseph's (Gibraltar)	0–10	(Scotland) Rangers	0–4	0–6
Cork City (Republic of Ireland)	2–3	(Luxembourg) Progrès Niederkorn	0–2	2–1
Ružomberok (Slovakia)	0–4	(Bulgaria) Levski Sofia	0–2	0–2
Akademija Pandev (North Macedonia)	0–6	(Bosnia and Herzegovina) Zrinjski Mostar	0–3	0–3
Speranța Nisporeni (Moldova)	0–9	(Azerbaijan) Neftçi	0–3	0–6
Zeta (Montenegro)	1–5	(Hungary) MOL Fehérvár	1–5	0–0
Shakhtyor Soligorsk (Belarus)	2–0	(Malta) Hibernians	1–0	1–0
Olimpija Ljubljana (Slovenia)	4–3	(Latvia) RFS	2–3	2–0
Honvéd (Hungary)	4–2	(Lithuania) Žalgiris	3–1	1–1
Alashkert (Armenia)	6–1	(North Macedonia) Makedonija GP	3–1	3–0
Radnik Bijeljina (Bosnia and Herzegovina)	2–2 (2–3 p)	(Slovakia) Spartak Trnava	2–0	0–2 (a.e.t.)
Fola Esch (Luxembourg)	2–4	(Georgia (country)) Chikhura Sachkhere	1–2	1–2
Dinamo Tbilisi (Georgia (country))	7–0	(Andorra) Engordany	6–0	1–0
Široki Brijeg (Bosnia and Herzegovina)	2–4	(Kazakhstan) Kairat	1–2	1–2
DAC Dunajská Streda (Slovakia)	3–3 (a)	(Poland) Cracovia	1–1	2–2 (a.e.t.)
Kauno Žalgiris (Lithuania)	0–6	(Cyprus) Apollon Limassol	0–2	0–4
Ventspils (Latvia)	3–1	(Albania) Teuta	3–0	0–1
Stjarnan (Iceland)	4–4 (a)	(Estonia) FCI Levadia	2–1	2–3 (a.e.t.)
Cliftonville (Northern Ireland)	1–6	(Norway) Haugesund	0–1	1–5
Riteriai (Lithuania)	1–1 (a)	(Faroe Islands) KÍ	1–1	0–0
Liepāja (Latvia)	3–2	(Belarus) Dinamo Minsk	1–1	2–1
St Patrick's Athletic (Republic of Ireland)	1–4	(Sweden) IFK Norrköping	0–2	1–2
Aberdeen (Scotland)	4–2	(Finland) RoPS	2–1	2–1
Balzan (Malta)	3–5	(Slovenia) Domžale	3–4	0–1
Laçi (Albania)	1–2	(Israel) Hapoel Be'er Sheva	1–1	0–1
Narva Trans (Estonia)	1–6	(Montenegro) Budućnost Podgorica	0–2	1–4
Sabail (Azerbaijan)	4–6	(Romania) Universitatea Craiova	2–3	2–3
Pyunik (Armenia)	5–4	(North Macedonia) Shkupi	3–3	2–1
AEK Larnaca (Cyprus)	2–0	(Moldova) Petrocub Hîncești	1–0	1–0

== Second qualifying round ==
The draw for the second qualifying round was held on 19 June 2019.

=== Seeding ===
A total of 18 teams were involved in the second qualifying round Champions Path draw.

- Seeded: 15 of the 16 losers of the Champions League first qualifying round (excluding the losers of the Champions League first qualifying round given a bye to the third qualifying round as decided by an additional draw held after the Champions League first qualifying round draw)
- Unseeded: the three losers of the Champions League preliminary round

They were divided into three groups of six teams, where five teams were seeded and one team were unseeded.

Champions Path
Bye to third qualifying round (decided by draw)	Group 1		Group 2		Group 3	
Bye to third qualifying round (decided by draw)	Seeded	Unseeded	Seeded	Unseeded	Seeded	Unseeded
(Bosnia and Herzegovina) Sarajevo	(Poland) Piast Gliwice; (Albania) Partizani; (Lithuania) Sūduva; (Moldova) Sheriff Tiraspol; (Latvia) Riga	(San Marino) Tre Penne	(Bulgaria) Ludogorets Razgrad; (Iceland) Valur; (Kosovo) Feronikeli; (Slovakia) Slovan Bratislava; Ararat-Armenia	(Gibraltar) Lincoln Red Imps	(Kazakhstan) Astana; (Northern Ireland) Linfield; (Faroe Islands) HB; (Luxembourg) F91 Dudelange; (North Macedonia) Shkëndija	(Andorra) FC Santa Coloma

A total of 74 teams were involved in the second qualifying round Main Path draw: 27 teams entering in this round, and the 47 winners of the first qualifying round. They were divided into seven groups: five groups of ten teams, where five teams were seeded and five teams were unseeded; and two groups of twelve teams, where six teams were seeded and six teams were unseeded. Numbers were pre-assigned for each team by UEFA, with the draw held in two runs, one for Groups 1–5 with ten teams and one for Groups 6–7 with twelve teams.

Main Path
Group 1		Group 2		Group 3	
Seeded	Unseeded	Seeded	Unseeded	Seeded	Unseeded
(Spain) Espanyol (2); (Israel) Hapoel Be'er Sheva (3); (Russia) Arsenal Tula (5); (Latvia) Liepāja (1); (Greece) Atromitos (4)	(Kazakhstan) Kairat (9); (Iceland) Stjarnan (8); (Sweden) IFK Norrköping (6); (Slovakia) DAC Dunajská Streda (10); (Azerbaijan) Neftçi (7)	(Poland) Legia Warsaw (5); (Cyprus) AEK Larnaca (3); (Netherlands) Utrecht (2); (Austria) Sturm Graz (1); (Czech Republic) Jablonec (4)	(Bosnia and Herzegovina) Zrinjski Mostar (8); (Finland) KuPS (7); (Norway) Haugesund (6); (Armenia) Pyunik (10); (Bulgaria) Levski Sofia (9)	(Germany) Eintracht Frankfurt (4); (Hungary) MOL Fehérvár (3); (Denmark) Brøndby (1); (Turkey) Yeni Malatyaspor (2); (Azerbaijan) Gabala (5)	(Estonia) Flora (10); (Liechtenstein) Vaduz (9); (Poland) Lechia Gdańsk (6); (Slovenia) Olimpija Ljubljana (8); (Georgia (country)) Dinamo Tbilisi (7)
Group 4		Group 5			
Seeded	Unseeded	Seeded	Unseeded		
(Sweden) Malmö FF (1); (Norway) Molde (3); (Ukraine) Zorya Luhansk (4); (Belgium) Gent (2); (Scotland) Aberdeen (5)	(Serbia) Čukarički (9); (Slovenia) Domžale (6); (Romania) Viitorul Constanța (8); (Georgia (country)) Chikhura Sachkhere (7); (Montenegro) Budućnost Podgorica (10)	(Italy) Torino (3); (Malta) Gżira United (4); (Croatia) Osijek (1); (Switzerland) Luzern (5); (Scotland) Rangers (2)	(Hungary) Debrecen (9); (Latvia) Ventspils (10); (Luxembourg) Progrès Niederkorn (8); (Bulgaria) CSKA Sofia (6); (Faroe Islands) KÍ (7)		
Group 6		Group 7			
Seeded	Unseeded	Seeded	Unseeded		
(Romania) FCSB (2); (Cyprus) Apollon Limassol (3); (France) Strasbourg (4); (Netherlands) AZ (5); (Slovakia) Spartak Trnava (6); (Czech Republic) Mladá Boleslav (1)	(Armenia) Alashkert (9); (Sweden) BK Häcken (8); (Republic of Ireland) Shamrock Rovers (12); (Kazakhstan) Ordabasy (7); (Israel) Maccabi Haifa (11); (Bulgaria) Lokomotiv Plovdiv (10)	(Serbia) Partizan (6); (England) Wolverhampton Wanderers (4); (Portugal) Vitória de Guimarães (3); (Hungary) Honvéd (5); (Denmark) Esbjerg (2); (Greece) Aris (1)	(Cyprus) AEL Limassol (7); (Wales) Connah's Quay Nomads (10); (Belarus) Shakhtyor Soligorsk (9); (Northern Ireland) Crusaders (11); (Luxembourg) Jeunesse Esch (12); (Romania) Universitatea Craiova (8)		

Notes

1. ^{†} Winners of the first qualifying round. Teams in italics defeated a team with a higher coefficient, thus effectively taking the coefficient of their opponent in the draw.
2. ^{‡} Roma and Antwerp were originally included in the draw but were later promoted to the group stage and third qualifying round respectively, after Milan and Mechelen were excluded from the competition. They were replaced in the second qualifying round by Torino and Gent respectively (had they originally been included in the draw, both of them would also have been seeded).

=== Summary ===
The first legs were played on 23, 24 and 25 July, and the second legs on 30, 31 July and 1 August 2019.

Team 1	Agg.	Team 2	1st leg	2nd leg
Champions Path
Sarajevo (Bosnia and Herzegovina)	Bye	N/A	—	—
Tre Penne (San Marino)	0–10	(Lithuania) Sūduva	0–5	0–5
Piast Gliwice (Poland)	4–4 (a)	(Latvia) Riga	3–2	1–2
Partizani (Albania)	1–2	(Moldova) Sheriff Tiraspol	0–1	1–1
Ararat-Armenia	4–1	(Gibraltar) Lincoln Red Imps	2–0	2–1
Valur (Iceland)	1–5	(Bulgaria) Ludogorets Razgrad	1–1	0–4
Slovan Bratislava (Slovakia)	4–1	(Kosovo) Feronikeli	2–1	2–0
FC Santa Coloma (Andorra)	1–4	(Kazakhstan) Astana	0–0	1–4
HB (Faroe Islands)	2–3	(Northern Ireland) Linfield	2–2	0–1
Shkëndija (North Macedonia)	2–3	(Luxembourg) F91 Dudelange	1–2	1–1
Main Path
IFK Norrköping (Sweden)	3–0	(Latvia) Liepāja	2–0	1–0
Hapoel Be'er Sheva (Israel)	3–1	(Kazakhstan) Kairat	2–0	1–1
Arsenal Tula (Russia)	0–4	(Azerbaijan) Neftçi	0–1	0–3
Espanyol (Spain)	7–1	(Iceland) Stjarnan	4–0	3–1
DAC Dunajská Streda (Slovakia)	3–5	(Greece) Atromitos	1–2	2–3
Haugesund (Norway)	3–2	(Austria) Sturm Graz	2–0	1–2
AEK Larnaca (Cyprus)	7–0	(Bulgaria) Levski Sofia	3–0	4–0
Legia Warsaw (Poland)	1–0	(Finland) KuPS	1–0	0–0
Utrecht (Netherlands)	2–3	(Bosnia and Herzegovina) Zrinjski Mostar	1–1	1–2 (a.e.t.)
Pyunik (Armenia)	2–1	(Czech Republic) Jablonec	2–1	0–0
Lechia Gdańsk (Poland)	3–5	(Denmark) Brøndby	2–1	1–4 (a.e.t.)
MOL Fehérvár (Hungary)	1–2	(Liechtenstein) Vaduz	1–0	0–2 (a.e.t.)
Gabala (Azerbaijan)	0–5	(Georgia (country)) Dinamo Tbilisi	0–2	0–3
Yeni Malatyaspor (Turkey)	3–2	(Slovenia) Olimpija Ljubljana	2–2	1–0
Flora (Estonia)	2–4	(Germany) Eintracht Frankfurt	1–2	1–2
Domžale (Slovenia)	4–5	(Sweden) Malmö FF	2–2	2–3
Molde (Norway)	3–1	(Serbia) Čukarički	0–0	3–1
Chikhura Sachkhere (Georgia (country))	1–6 (Note: Order of legs reversed after original draw.)	(Scotland) Aberdeen	1–1	0–5
Gent (Belgium)	7–5	(Romania) Viitorul Constanța	6–3	1–2
Budućnost Podgorica (Montenegro)	1–4	(Ukraine) Zorya Luhansk	1–3	0–1
CSKA Sofia (Bulgaria)	1–1 (4–3 p)	(Croatia) Osijek	1–0	0–1 (a.e.t.)
Torino (Italy)	7–1	(Hungary) Debrecen	3–0	4–1
Luzern (Switzerland)	2–0	(Faroe Islands) KÍ	1–0	1–0
Rangers (Scotland)	2–0	(Luxembourg) Progrès Niederkorn	2–0	0–0
Ventspils (Latvia)	6–2	(Malta) Gżira United	4–0	2–2
Strasbourg (France)	4–3	(Israel) Maccabi Haifa	3–1	1–2
Mladá Boleslav (Czech Republic)	4–3	(Kazakhstan) Ordabasy	1–1	3–2
Shamrock Rovers (Republic of Ireland)	3–4	(Cyprus) Apollon Limassol	2–1	1–3 (a.e.t.)
AZ (Netherlands)	3–0	(Sweden) BK Häcken	0–0	3–0
Alashkert (Armenia)	3–5	(Romania) FCSB	0–3	3–2
Lokomotiv Plovdiv (Bulgaria)	3–3 (a)	(Slovakia) Spartak Trnava	2–0	1–3
Wolverhampton Wanderers (England)	6–1	(Northern Ireland) Crusaders	2–0	4–1
Aris (Greece)	1–0	(Cyprus) AEL Limassol	0–0	1–0
Jeunesse Esch (Luxembourg)	0–5	(Portugal) Vitória de Guimarães	0–1	0–4
Honvéd (Hungary)	0–0 (1–3 p)	(Romania) Universitatea Craiova	0–0	0–0 (a.e.t.)
Shakhtyor Soligorsk (Belarus)	2–0	(Denmark) Esbjerg	2–0	0–0
Connah's Quay Nomads (Wales)	0–4	(Serbia) Partizan	0–1	0–3

== Third qualifying round ==
The draw for the third qualifying round was held on 22 July 2019.

=== Seeding ===
A total of 20 teams were involved in the third qualifying round Champions Path draw.

- Seeded: the 10 losers of the Champions League second qualifying round Champions Path
- Unseeded: the loser of the Champions League first qualifying round which received a bye, and the 9 winners of the Europa League second qualifying round Champions Path

They were divided into two groups of ten teams, where five teams were seeded and five teams were unseeded.

Champions Path
Group 1		Group 2	
Seeded	Unseeded	Seeded	Unseeded
(Wales) The New Saints; (Georgia (country)) Saburtalo Tbilisi; (Montenegro) Sutjeska; (Finland) HJK; (Israel) Maccabi Tel Aviv	(Bulgaria) Ludogorets Razgrad; (Lithuania) Sūduva; Ararat-Armenia; (Latvia) Riga; (Northern Ireland) Linfield	(Estonia) Nõmme Kalju; (Belarus) BATE Borisov; (Republic of Ireland) Dundalk; (Sweden) AIK; (Malta) Valletta	(Kazakhstan) Astana; (Moldova) Sheriff Tiraspol; (Luxembourg) F91 Dudelange; (Slovakia) Slovan Bratislava; (Bosnia and Herzegovina) Sarajevo

Notes

1. ^{†} Loser of the Champions League first qualifying round which received a bye.

A total of 52 teams were involved in the third qualifying round Main Path draw: 13 teams entering in this round, the 37 winners of the second qualifying round Main Path, and the two Champions League losers of the second qualifying round League Path. They were divided into five groups: four groups of ten teams, where five teams were seeded and five teams were unseeded; and one group of twelve teams, where six teams were seeded and six teams were unseeded. Numbers were pre-assigned for each team by UEFA, with the draw held in two runs, one for Groups 1–4 with ten teams and one for Group 5 with twelve teams.

Main Path
Group 1		Group 2		Group 3	
Seeded	Unseeded	Seeded	Unseeded	Seeded	Unseeded
(Czech Republic) Viktoria Plzeň (5); (Netherlands) Feyenoord (2); (Italy) Torino (4); (Cyprus) Apollon Limassol (3); (Israel) Hapoel Be'er Sheva (1)	Austria Wien (6); (Belgium) Antwerp (10); (Georgia (country)) Dinamo Tbilisi (8); (Belarus) Shakhtyor Soligorsk (9); (Sweden) IFK Norrköping (7)	(Portugal) Braga (1); (Romania) FCSB (2); (Russia) Spartak Moscow (3); (Norway) Molde (4); (France) Strasbourg (5)	(Bulgaria) Lokomotiv Plovdiv (10); (Denmark) Brøndby (7); (Czech Republic) Mladá Boleslav (8); (Greece) Aris (9); (Switzerland) Thun (6)	(Belgium) Gent (3); (Poland) Legia Warsaw (2); (England) Wolverhampton Wanderers (1); (Denmark) Midtjylland (4); (Netherlands) AZ (5)	(Cyprus) AEK Larnaca (6); (Ukraine) Mariupol (10); (Armenia) Pyunik (7); (Greece) Atromitos (8); (Scotland) Rangers (9)
Group 4		Group 5			
Seeded	Unseeded	Seeded	Unseeded		
(Netherlands) PSV Eindhoven (1); (Germany) Eintracht Frankfurt (3); (Serbia) Partizan (2); (Croatia) Rijeka (4); (Portugal) Vitória de Guimarães (5)	(Liechtenstein) Vaduz (6); (Turkey) Yeni Malatyaspor (8); (Norway) Haugesund (7); (Scotland) Aberdeen (9); (Latvia) Ventspils (10)	(Czech Republic) Sparta Prague (1); (Spain) Espanyol (2); (Sweden) Malmö FF (3); (Greece) AEK Athens (4); (Ukraine) Zorya Luhansk (5); (Azerbaijan) Neftçi (6)	(Turkey) Trabzonspor (7); (Bosnia and Herzegovina) Zrinjski Mostar (8); (Bulgaria) CSKA Sofia (9); (Switzerland) Luzern (10); (Israel) Bnei Yehuda (11); (Romania) Universitatea Craiova (12)		

Notes

1. ^{†} Winners of the second qualifying round. Teams in italics defeated a team with a higher coefficient, thus effectively taking the coefficient of their opponent in the draw.
2. ^{CL} Losers of the Champions League second qualifying round. Teams in italics lost to a team with a higher coefficient, thus effectively taking the coefficient of their opponent in the draw.

=== Summary ===
The first legs were played on 6, 7 and 8 August, and the second legs on 13, 14 and 15 August 2019.

Team 1	Agg.	Team 2	1st leg	2nd leg
Champions Path
Sutjeska (Montenegro)	3–5	(Northern Ireland) Linfield	1–2	2–3
Maccabi Tel Aviv (Israel)	2–4	(Lithuania) Sūduva	1–2	1–2
Ararat-Armenia	3–2	(Georgia (country)) Saburtalo Tbilisi	1–2	2–0
Riga (Latvia)	3–3 (a)	(Finland) HJK	1–1	2–2
Ludogorets Razgrad (Bulgaria)	9–0	(Wales) The New Saints	5–0	4–0
Sarajevo (Bosnia and Herzegovina)	1–2	(Belarus) BATE Borisov	1–2	0–0
F91 Dudelange (Luxembourg)	4–1	(Estonia) Nõmme Kalju	3–1	1–0
Astana (Kazakhstan)	9–1	(Malta) Valletta	5–1	4–0
Sheriff Tiraspol (Moldova)	2–3	(Sweden) AIK	1–2	1–1
Slovan Bratislava (Slovakia)	4–1	(Republic of Ireland) Dundalk	1–0	3–1
Main Path
IFK Norrköping (Sweden)	2–4	(Israel) Hapoel Be'er Sheva	1–1	1–3
Torino (Italy)	6–1	(Belarus) Shakhtyor Soligorsk	5–0	1–1
Antwerp (Belgium)	2–2 (a)	(Czech Republic) Viktoria Plzeň	1–0	1–2 (a.e.t.)
Austria Wien	2–5	(Cyprus) Apollon Limassol	1–2	1–3
Feyenoord (Netherlands)	5–1	(Georgia (country)) Dinamo Tbilisi	4–0	1–1
Brøndby (Denmark)	3–7	(Portugal) Braga	2–4	1–3
Molde (Norway)	4–3	(Greece) Aris	3–0	1–3 (a.e.t.)
Lokomotiv Plovdiv (Bulgaria)	0–2	(France) Strasbourg	0–1	0–1
Thun (Switzerland)	3–5	(Russia) Spartak Moscow	2–3	1–2
FCSB (Romania)	1–0	(Czech Republic) Mladá Boleslav	0–0	1–0
Pyunik (Armenia)	0–8	(England) Wolverhampton Wanderers	0–4	0–4
Midtjylland (Denmark)	3–7	(Scotland) Rangers	2–4	1–3
Mariupol (Ukraine)	0–4	(Netherlands) AZ	0–0	0–4
AEK Larnaca (Cyprus)	1–4	(Belgium) Gent	1–1	0–3
Legia Warsaw (Poland)	2–0	(Greece) Atromitos	0–0	2–0
Haugesund (Norway)	0–1	(Netherlands) PSV Eindhoven	0–1	0–0
Rijeka (Croatia)	4–0	(Scotland) Aberdeen	2–0	2–0
Ventspils (Latvia)	0–9	(Portugal) Vitória de Guimarães	0–3	0–6
Vaduz (Liechtenstein)	0–6	(Germany) Eintracht Frankfurt	0–5	0–1
Partizan (Serbia)	3–2	(Turkey) Yeni Malatyaspor	3–1	0–1
Malmö FF (Sweden)	3–1	(Bosnia and Herzegovina) Zrinjski Mostar	3–0	0–1
CSKA Sofia (Bulgaria)	1–2	(Ukraine) Zorya Luhansk	1–1	0–1
Neftçi (Azerbaijan)	3–4	(Israel) Bnei Yehuda	2–2	1–2
Luzern (Switzerland)	0–6	(Spain) Espanyol	0–3	0–3
Sparta Prague (Czech Republic)	3–4	(Turkey) Trabzonspor	2–2	1–2
Universitatea Craiova (Romania)	1–3	(Greece) AEK Athens	0–2	1–1

== Play-off round ==
The draw for the play-off round was held on 5 August 2019.

=== Seeding ===
A total of 16 teams were involved in the play-off round Champions Path draw.

- Seeded: the six losers of the Champions League third qualifying round Champions Path
- Unseeded: the 10 winners of the Europa League third qualifying round Champions Path

They were divided into two groups of eight teams, where three teams were seeded and five teams were unseeded.

Champions Path
Group 1		Group 2	
Seeded	Unseeded	Seeded	Unseeded
(Scotland) Celtic; (Denmark) Copenhagen; (Hungary) Ferencváros	(Lithuania) Sūduva; (Sweden) AIK; (Latvia) Riga; (Luxembourg) F91 Dudelange; Ararat-Armenia	(Greece) PAOK; (Azerbaijan) Qarabağ; (Slovenia) Maribor	(Belarus) BATE Borisov; (Kazakhstan) Astana; (Bulgaria) Ludogorets Razgrad; (Slovakia) Slovan Bratislava; (Northern Ireland) Linfield

A total of 26 teams, all winners of the third qualifying round Main Path, were involved in the play-off round Main Path draw. They were divided into three groups: two groups of eight teams, where four teams were seeded and four teams were unseeded; and one group of ten teams, where five teams were seeded and five teams were unseeded. Numbers were pre-assigned for each team by UEFA, with the draw held in two runs, one for Groups 1–2 with eight teams and one for Group 3 with ten teams.

Main Path
Group 1		Group 2		Group 3	
Seeded	Unseeded	Seeded	Unseeded	Seeded	Unseeded
(Netherlands) PSV Eindhoven (4); (Poland) Legia Warsaw (2); (Romania) FCSB (3); (England) Wolverhampton Wanderers (1)	(Italy) Torino (5); (Scotland) Rangers (8); (Cyprus) Apollon Limassol (7); (Portugal) Vitória de Guimarães (6)	(Turkey) Trabzonspor (1); (Belgium) Gent (3); (Netherlands) Feyenoord (2); (Spain) Espanyol (4)	(Greece) AEK Athens (5); (Croatia) Rijeka (6); (Israel) Hapoel Be'er Sheva (8); (Ukraine) Zorya Luhansk (7)	(Belgium) Antwerp (1); (Portugal) Braga (2); (Germany) Eintracht Frankfurt (3); (Sweden) Malmö FF (4); (Serbia) Partizan (5)	(Russia) Spartak Moscow (6); (Norway) Molde (7); (France) Strasbourg (8); (Netherlands) AZ (9); (Israel) Bnei Yehuda (10)

Notes

1. ^{†} Winners of the third qualifying round. Teams in italics defeated a team with a higher coefficient, thus effectively taking the coefficient of their opponent in the draw.

=== Summary ===
The first legs were played on 22 August, and the second legs on 29 August 2019.

Team 1	Agg.	Team 2	1st leg	2nd leg
Champions Path
Sūduva (Lithuania)	2–4	(Hungary) Ferencváros	0–0	2–4
Copenhagen (Denmark)	3–2	(Latvia) Riga	3–1	0–1
Celtic (Scotland)	6–1	(Sweden) AIK	2–0	4–1
Ararat-Armenia	3–3 (4–5 p)	(Luxembourg) F91 Dudelange	2–1	1–2 (a.e.t.)
Ludogorets Razgrad (Bulgaria)	2–2 (a)	(Slovenia) Maribor	0–0	2–2
Linfield (Northern Ireland)	4–4 (a)	(Azerbaijan) Qarabağ	3–2	1–2
Slovan Bratislava (Slovakia)	3–3 (a)	(Greece) PAOK	1–0	2–3
Astana (Kazakhstan)	3–2	(Belarus) BATE Borisov	3–0	0–2
Main Path
Torino (Italy)	3–5	(England) Wolverhampton Wanderers	2–3	1–2
Legia Warsaw (Poland)	0–1	(Scotland) Rangers	0–0	0–1
FCSB (Romania)	0–1	(Portugal) Vitória de Guimarães	0–0	0–1
PSV Eindhoven (Netherlands)	7–0	(Cyprus) Apollon Limassol	3–0	4–0
AEK Athens (Greece)	3–3 (a)	(Turkey) Trabzonspor	1–3	2–0
Feyenoord (Netherlands)	6–0	(Israel) Hapoel Be'er Sheva	3–0	3–0
Gent (Belgium)	3–2	(Croatia) Rijeka	2–1	1–1
Espanyol (Spain)	5–3	(Ukraine) Zorya Luhansk	3–1	2–2
Partizan (Serbia)	3–2	(Norway) Molde	2–1	1–1
Braga (Portugal)	3–1	(Russia) Spartak Moscow	1–0	2–1
Malmö FF (Sweden)	4–0	(Israel) Bnei Yehuda	3–0	1–0
Strasbourg (France)	1–3	(Germany) Eintracht Frankfurt	1–0	0–3
AZ (Netherlands)	5–2	(Belgium) Antwerp	1–1	4–1 (a.e.t.)

== Top goalscorers ==
There were 872 goals scored in 314 matches in the qualifying phase and play-off round, for an average of 2.78 goals per match.

Rank	Player	Team	Goals
1	(Colombia) Alfredo Morelos	(Scotland) Rangers	8
2	(Croatia) Marin Tomasov	(Kazakhstan) Astana	7
3	(Argentina) Facundo Ferreyra	(Spain) Espanyol	6
3	(Mexico) Raúl Jiménez	(England) Wolverhampton Wanderers	6
3	(England) Sam Cosgrove	(Scotland) Aberdeen	6
3	(Italy) Andrea Belotti	(Italy) Torino	6
7	(Bosnia and Herzegovina) Mihret Topčagić	(Lithuania) Sūduva	5
7	(Sweden) Markus Rosenberg	(Sweden) Malmö FF	5
7	(North Macedonia) Ivan Trichkovski	(Cyprus) AEK Larnaca	5
7	(Luxembourg) Danel Sinani	(Luxembourg) F91 Dudelange	5
7	(Argentina) Emilio Zelaya	(Cyprus) Apollon Limassol	5
