= Mayron De Almeida =

Belgian footballer (born 1995)

Personal information
- Date of birth: 22 November 1995 (age 30)
- Place of birth: Virton, Belgium
- Height: 1.77 m (5 ft 10 in)
- Position: Forward

Team information
- Current team: Mons
- Number: 10

Senior career*
Years	Team	Apps	(Gls)
2012–2016	Virton	73	(11)
2016–2017	Tours	6	(0)
2016–2017	→ Tours II	22	(6)
2018–2020	Progrès Niederkorn	52	(13)
2020–2021	Red Star	18	(0)
2021–2023	Progrès Niederkorn	59	(28)
2023–2026	Virton	67	(33)
2026–	Mons	6	(1)
- * Club domestic league appearances and goals as of 3 October 2026

Mayron De Almeida (born 22 November 1995) is a Belgian professional footballer who plays as a forward for Belgian Division 1 club Mons.

== Career ==
De Almeida came through the youth ranks of Belgian club R.E. Virton. After 11 years at the clubs he left the club and signed for French Ligue 2 side FC Tours. He made his Ligue 2 debut for Tours against Gazélec Ajaccio on 30 September 2016.

In December 2017, De Almeida joined Luxembourgish club Progrès Niederkorn on a two-and-a-half-year contract.

On 1 July 2020, De Almeida signed a two-year deal with Red Star F.C. in the French Championnat National.

On 29 August 2023, Belgian National Division 1 club Virton announced the return of De Almeida, after a highly successful two-year stint at Luxembourgish club Progrès Niederkorn.

== Personal life ==
De Almeida is of Portuguese descent.

== Career statistics ==
As of 6 July 2021

Appearances and goals by club, season and competition
Club	Season	League			National Cup		League Cup		Europe		Total	
Club	Season	Division	Apps	Goals	Apps	Goals	Apps	Goals	Apps	Goals	Apps	Goals
Virton	2012–13	Third Division	6	1	0	0	–		–		6	1
Virton	2013–14	Second Division	20	3	1	0	–		–		21	3
Virton	2014–15	Second Division	23	5	0	0	–		–		23	5
Virton	2015–16	Second Division	24	2	2	0	–		–		26	2
Virton	Total		73	11	3	0	0	0	0	0	76	11
Tours	2016–17	Ligue 2	6	0	0	0	0	0	–		6	0
Tours	2016–17	Ligue 2	0	0	1	0	1	0	–		2	0
Tours	Total		6	0	1	0	1	0	0	0	8	0
Progrès Niederkorn	2017–18	Luxembourg National Division	13	1					0	0	13	1
Progrès Niederkorn	2018–19	Luxembourg National Division	24	6					6	3	30	9
Progrès Niederkorn	2019–20	Luxembourg National Division	15	6					6	3	21	9
Progrès Niederkorn	Total		52	13	0	0	0	0	12	6	64	19
Red Star	2020–21	Championnat National	16	0	3	1	0	0	–		19	1
Career total			147	24	7	1	1	0	12	6	167	31
