= Miljan Govedarica =

Bosnian footballer (born 1994)

Personal information
- Date of birth: 26 May 1994 (age 32)
- Place of birth: Sarajevo, Bosnia and Herzegovina
- Height: 1.86 m (6 ft 1 in)
- Position: Left midfielder

Team information
- Current team: Sloboda Tuzla

Youth career
- Slavija Sarajevo

Senior career*
Years	Team	Apps	(Gls)
2013–2014	Donji Srem	4	(0)
2014–2015	Slavija Sarajevo	24	(2)
2015–2017	Sloboda Tuzla	22	(0)
2017	Olimpik Sarajevo	10	(2)
2017	Slavija Sarajevo	12	(6)
2018–2019	Zvijezda 09	28	(12)
2019–2021	Zrinjski Mostar	28	(4)
2021–2022	Kryvbas Kryvyi Rih	10	(1)
2022	Leotar	9	(2)
2022–2024	Bosna Neuchatel		
2024–2025	Slavija Sarajevo	44	(25)
2025–2026	Sileks	10	(1)
2026–	Sloboda Tuzla	3	(1)

International career
2014–2016	Bosnia and Herzegovina U21	2	(0)
- * Club domestic league appearances and goals as of 12 June 2026

Miljan Govedarica (born 26 May 1994) is a Bosnian professional footballer who plays as a left midfielder for First League of FBiH club Sloboda Tuzla.

== Club career ==
Born in Sarajevo, Govedarica started playing with local club Slavija before signing with Serbian side Donji Srem and playing with them in the 2013–14 Serbian SuperLiga. After one season in Serbia, he returned to Slavija in the summer of 2014.

In 2015, he left Slavija for Sloboda Tuzla. After Sloboda, Govedarica also played for Olimpik, Slavija again and Zvijezda 09, who he joined in January 2018. Govedarica won the First League of RS in the 2017–18 season and got promoted to the Bosnian Premier League with Zvijezda 09. He left the club after his contract expired on 29 May 2019.

On 11 June 2019, Govedarica signed a two-year contract with Zrinjski Mostar. He made his official debut and scored his first goal for Zrinjski on 11 July 2019, in a 0–3 away win against Akademija Pandev in the 2019–20 UEFA Europa League first qualifying round. Govedarica made his first league appearance for Zrinjski on 21 July 2019, in a 1–0 away loss against Sarajevo. He scored his first league goal for Zrinjski on 24 August 2019, in a 4–0 home win against Borac Banja Luka. Govedarica left Zrinjski in June 2021.

== International career ==
Govedarica's impressive start in the 2014–15 Bosnian Premier League season made him receive a call from Bosnia and Herzegovina U21 national team head coach Vlado Jagodić to play for the team, making his debut on 8 September 2014. Between 2014 and 2016, he made 2 appearances for the national team.

== Honours ==
Sloboda Tuzla

- Bosnian Premier League runner up: 2015–16
- Bosnian Cup runner up: 2015–16

Zvijezda 09

- First League of RS: 2017–18
