= Luca Tosi =

Sammarinese footballer

Personal information
- Full name: Luca Tosi
- Date of birth: 4 November 1992 (age 34)
- Place of birth: Rimini, Italy
- Height: 1.88 m (6 ft 2 in)
- Position: Midfielder

Senior career*
Years	Team	Apps	(Gls)
2013–2014	Folgore	6	(0)
2014–2020	Virtus	65	(1)
2020–2023	Pietracuta	0	(0)
2023–2024	Verucchio	0	(0)

International career^{‡}
	San Marino U21	5	(0)
2014–2020	San Marino	19	(0)
- * Club domestic league appearances and goals as of 5 June 2026 ‡ National team caps and goals as of 8 September 2020

Luca Tosi (born 4 November 1992) is a retired San Marino international footballer who last played as a midfielder for Verucchio.
