= 2019–20 UEFA Europa League =

49th season of Europe's secondary club football tournament organised by UEFA

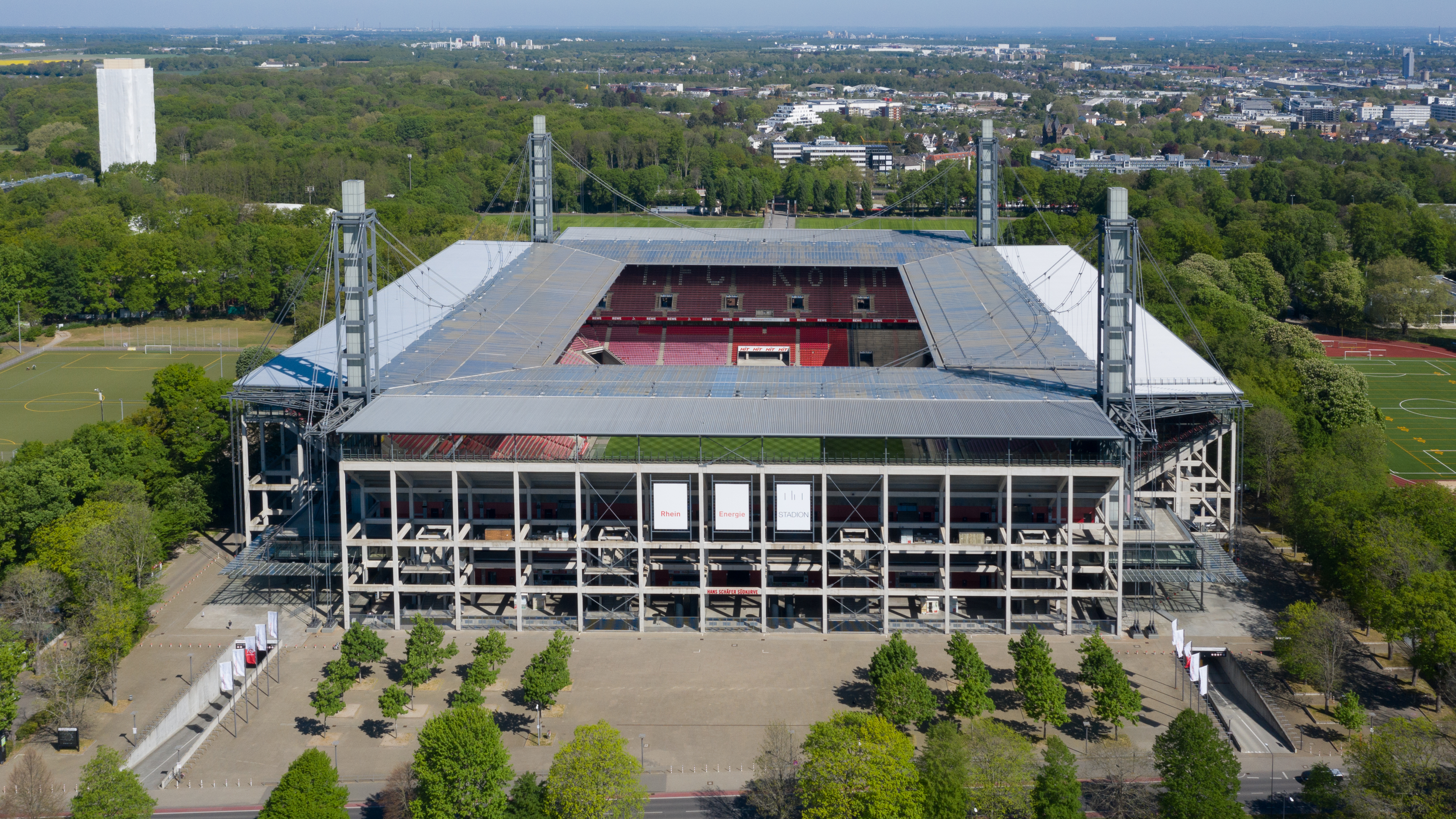
- The RheinEnergieStadion in Cologne hosted the final

Tournament details
- Dates: Qualifying: 27 June – 29 August 2019; Competition proper: 19 September 2019 – 21 August 2020
- Teams: Competition proper: 48+8; Total: 158+55 (from 55 associations)

Final positions
- Champions: (Spain) Sevilla (6th title)
- Runners-up: (Italy) Inter Milan

Tournament statistics
- Matches played: 197
- Goals scored: 548 (2.78 per match)
- Attendance: 4,069,102 (20,655 per match)
- Top scorer(s): Bruno Fernandes (Sporting CP/ Manchester United); 8 goals
- Best player: Romelu Lukaku (Inter Milan)

The 2019–20 UEFA Europa League was the 49th season of Europe's secondary club football tournament organised by UEFA, and the 11th season since it was renamed from the UEFA Cup to the UEFA Europa League.

Sevilla defeated Inter Milan in the final, played at the RheinEnergieStadion in Cologne, Germany, 3–2 for a record-extending sixth title in the competition. As winners, Sevilla earned the right to play against Bayern Munich, the winners of the 2019–20 UEFA Champions League, in the 2020 UEFA Super Cup. Since they had already qualified for the 2020–21 UEFA Champions League group stage through their league performance, the berth originally reserved for the Europa League title holders was given to the third-placed team of the 2019–20 Ligue 1 (Rennes), the 5th-ranked association according to next season's access list.

Due to the impact of the COVID-19 pandemic, the tournament was suspended in mid-March 2020 and resumed in August. The quarter-finals onwards were played as a single match knockout ties at neutral venues in Germany (RheinEnergieStadion, MSV-Arena, Merkur Spiel-Arena and Arena AufSchalke) behind closed doors from 10 to 21 August. The video assistant referee (VAR) system was used in the competition from the knockout stage onwards.

As the title holders of the Europa League, Chelsea qualified for the 2019–20 UEFA Champions League, although they had already qualified before the final through their league performance. They were unable to defend their title as they advanced to the Champions League knockout stage, and were eliminated by the ultimate winners Bayern Munich in the round of 16.

== Association team allocation ==
A total of 213 teams from all 55 UEFA member associations participated in the 2019–20 UEFA Europa League. The association ranking based on the UEFA country coefficients was used to determine the number of participating teams for each association:

- Associations 1–51 (except Liechtenstein) each had three teams qualify.
- Associations 52–54 each had two teams qualify.
- Liechtenstein and Kosovo (association 55) each had one team qualify (Liechtenstein organised only a domestic cup and no domestic league; Kosovo as per decision by the UEFA Executive Committee).
- Moreover, 55 teams eliminated from the 2019–20 UEFA Champions League were transferred to the Europa League (default number was 57, but 2 fewer teams competed in the 2019–20 UEFA Champions League).

=== Association ranking ===
For the 2019–20 UEFA Europa League, the associations were allocated places according to their 2018 UEFA country coefficients, which took into account their performance in European competitions from 2013–14 to 2017–18.

Apart from the allocation based on the country coefficients, associations could have additional teams participating in the Champions League, as noted below:

- (UCL) – Additional teams transferred from the UEFA Champions League

Association ranking for 2019–20 UEFA Europa League

| Rank | Association | Coeff. | Teams | Notes |
|---|---|---|---|---|
| 1 | Spain | 106.998 | 3 | |
| 2 | England | 79.605 | 3 | |
| 3 | Italy | 76.249 | 3 | +1 (UCL) |
| 4 | Germany | 71.427 | 3 | +1 (UCL) |
| 5 | France | 56.415 | 3 | |
| 6 | Russia | 53.382 | 3 | +1 (UCL) |
| 7 | Portugal | 47.248 | 3 | +2 (UCL) |
| 8 | Ukraine | 41.133 | 3 | +2 (UCL) |
| 9 | Belgium | 38.500 | 3 | +1 (UCL) |
| 10 | Turkey | 35.800 | 3 | +1 (UCL) |
| 11 | Austria | 32.850 | 3 | +2 (UCL) |
| 12 | Switzerland | 30.200 | 3 | +2 (UCL) |
| 13 | Czech Republic | 30.175 | 3 | +1 (UCL) |
| 14 | Netherlands | 29.749 | 3 | +2 (UCL) |
| 15 | Greece | 28.600 | 3 | +2 (UCL) |
| 16 | Croatia | 26.000 | 3 | |
| 17 | Denmark | 25.950 | 3 | +1 (UCL) |
| 18 | Israel | 21.750 | 3 | +1 (UCL) |
| 19 | Cyprus | 21.550 | 3 | +1 (UCL) |

| Rank | Association | Coeff. | Teams | Notes |
|---|---|---|---|---|
| 20 | Romania | 20.450 | 3 | +1 (UCL) |
| 21 | Poland | 20.125 | 3 | +1 (UCL) |
| 22 | Sweden | 19.975 | 3 | +1 (UCL) |
| 23 | Azerbaijan | 19.125 | 3 | +1 (UCL) |
| 24 | Bulgaria | 19.125 | 3 | +1 (UCL) |
| 25 | Serbia | 18.750 | 3 | |
| 26 | Scotland | 18.625 | 3 | +1 (UCL) |
| 27 | Belarus | 18.625 | 3 | +1 (UCL) |
| 28 | Kazakhstan | 18.125 | 3 | +1 (UCL) |
| 29 | Norway | 17.425 | 3 | +1 (UCL) |
| 30 | Slovenia | 14.500 | 3 | +1 (UCL) |
| 31 | Liechtenstein | 13.000 | 1 | |
| 32 | Slovakia | 12.125 | 3 | +1 (UCL) |
| 33 | Moldova | 10.000 | 3 | +1 (UCL) |
| 34 | Albania | 8.500 | 3 | +1 (UCL) |
| 35 | Iceland | 8.250 | 3 | +1 (UCL) |
| 36 | Hungary | 8.125 | 3 | +1 (UCL) |
| 37 | North Macedonia | 7.500 | 3 | +1 (UCL) |

| Rank | Association | Coeff. | Teams | Notes |
|---|---|---|---|---|
| 38 | Finland | 6.900 | 3 | +1 (UCL) |
| 39 | Republic of Ireland | 6.700 | 3 | +1 (UCL) |
| 40 | Bosnia and Herzegovina | 6.625 | 3 | +1 (UCL) |
| 41 | Latvia | 5.625 | 3 | +1 (UCL) |
| 42 | Estonia | 5.500 | 3 | +1 (UCL) |
| 43 | Lithuania | 5.375 | 3 | +1 (UCL) |
| 44 | Montenegro | 5.000 | 3 | +1 (UCL) |
| 45 | Georgia | 5.000 | 3 | +1 (UCL) |
| 46 | Armenia | 4.875 | 3 | +1 (UCL) |
| 47 | Malta | 4.500 | 3 | +1 (UCL) |
| 48 | Luxembourg | 4.375 | 3 | +1 (UCL) |
| 49 | Northern Ireland | 4.250 | 3 | +1 (UCL) |
| 50 | Wales | 3.875 | 3 | +1 (UCL) |
| 51 | Faroe Islands | 3.750 | 3 | +1 (UCL) |
| 52 | Gibraltar | 3.000 | 2 | +1 (UCL) |
| 53 | Andorra | 1.331 | 2 | +1 (UCL) |
| 54 | San Marino | 0.499 | 2 | +1 (UCL) |
| 55 | Kosovo | 0.000 | 1 | +1 (UCL) |

=== Distribution ===
The following is the access list for this season.

Access list for 2019–20 UEFA Europa League
| | | Teams entering in this round | Teams advancing from previous round | Teams transferred from Champions League |
|---|---|---|---|---|
| Preliminary round (14 teams) | | 4 domestic cup winners from associations 52–55; 6 domestic league runners-up from associations 49–54; 4 domestic league third-placed teams from associations 48–51 | | |
| First qualifying round (94 teams) | | 26 domestic cup winners from associations 26–51; 30 domestic league runners-up from associations 18–48 (except Liechtenstein); 31 domestic league third-placed teams from associations 16–47 (except Liechtenstein) | 7 winners from preliminary round | |
| Second qualifying round | Champions Path (18 teams) | | | 15 losers from Champions League first qualifying round; 3 losers from Champions League preliminary round |
| Second qualifying round | Main Path (74 teams) | 7 domestic cup winners from associations 19–25; 2 domestic league runners-up from associations 16–17; 3 domestic league third-placed teams from associations 13–15; 9 domestic league fourth-placed teams from associations 7–15; 2 domestic league fifth-placed teams from associations 5–6 (League Cup winners for France); 4 domestic league sixth-placed teams from associations 1–4 (League Cup winners for England) | 47 winners from first qualifying round | |
| Third qualifying round | Champions Path (20 teams) | | 9 winners from second qualifying round (Champions Path) | 10 losers from Champions League second qualifying round (Champions Path); 1 losers from Champions League first qualifying round (Champions Path) |
| Third qualifying round | Main Path (52 teams) | 6 domestic cup winners from associations 13–18; 6 domestic league third-placed teams from associations 7–12; 1 domestic league fourth-placed team from association 6 | 37 winners from second qualifying round (Main Path) | 2 losers from Champions League second qualifying round (League Path) |
| Play-off round | Champions Path (16 teams) | | 10 winners from third qualifying round (Champions Path) | 6 losers from Champions League third qualifying round (Champions Path) |
| Play-off round | Main Path (26 teams) | | 26 winners from third qualifying round (Main Path) | |
| Group stage (48 teams) | | 12 domestic cup winners from associations 1–12; 1 domestic league fourth-placed team from association 5; 4 domestic league fifth-placed teams from associations 1–4 | 8 winners from play-off round (Champions Path); 13 winners from play-off round (Main Path) | 4 losers from Champions League play-off round (Champions Path); 2 losers from Champions League play-off round (League Path); 4 losers from Champions League third qualifying round (League Path) |
| Knockout phase (32 teams) | | | 12 group winners from group stage; 12 group runners-up from group stage | 8 third-placed teams from Champions League group stage |

Changes were made to the default access list, if any of the teams that qualified for the Europa League via their domestic competitions also qualified for the Champions League as the Champions League or Europa League title holders, or if there were fewer teams transferred from the Champions League due to changes in the Champions League access list. In any case where a spot in the Europa League was vacated, cup winners of the highest-ranked associations in earlier rounds were promoted accordingly.

- In the default access list, originally 17 losers from the Champions League first qualifying round were transferred to the Europa League second qualifying round (Champions Path). However, since the Champions League title holders (Liverpool) qualified for the Champions League group stage via their domestic league, only 16 losers from the Champions League first qualifying round were transferred to the Europa League second qualifying round (Champions Path). As a result, only 19 teams entered the Champions Path second qualifying round (one of the losers from the Champions League first qualifying round would be drawn to receive a bye to the third qualifying round).
- In the default access list, originally three losers from the Champions League second qualifying round (League Path) were transferred to the Europa League third qualifying round (Main Path). However, since the Europa League title holders (Chelsea) qualified for the Champions League group stage via their domestic league, only two losers from the Champions League second qualifying round (League Path) were transferred to the Europa League third qualifying round (Main Path). As a result, the following changes to the access list were made:
  - The cup winners of association 18 (Israel) entered the third qualifying round instead of the second qualifying round.
  - The cup winners of association 25 (Serbia) entered the second qualifying round instead of the first qualifying round.
  - The cup winners of associations 50 (Wales) and 51 (Faroe Islands) entered the first qualifying round instead of the preliminary round.

==== Redistribution rules ====
A Europa League place was vacated when a team qualified for both the Champions League and the Europa League, or qualified for the Europa League by more than one method. When a place was vacated, it was redistributed within the national association by the following rules:

- When the domestic cup winners (considered as the "highest-placed" qualifier within the national association with the latest starting round) also qualified for the Champions League, their Europa League place was vacated. As a result, the highest-placed team in the league which had not yet qualified for European competitions qualified for the Europa League, with the Europa League qualifiers which finished above them in the league moving up one "place".
- When the domestic cup winners also qualified for the Europa League through league position, their place through the league position was vacated. As a result, the highest-placed team in the league which had not yet qualified for European competitions qualified for the Europa League, with the Europa League qualifiers which finished above them in the league moving up one "place" if possible.
- For associations where a Europa League place was reserved for either the League Cup or end-of-season European competition play-offs winners, they always qualified for the Europa League as the "lowest-placed" qualifier. If the League Cup winners had already qualified for European competitions through other methods, this reserved Europa League place was taken by the highest-placed team in the league which had not yet qualified for European competitions.

=== Teams ===
The labels in the parentheses show how each team qualified for the place of its starting round:

- CW: Cup winners
- 2nd, 3rd, 4th, 5th, 6th, etc.: League position
- LC: League Cup winners
- RW: Regular season winners
- PW: End-of-season Europa League play-offs winners
- UCL: Transferred from the Champions League
  - GS: Third-placed teams from the group stage
  - PO: Losers from the play-off round
  - Q3: Losers from the third qualifying round
  - Q2: Losers from the second qualifying round
  - Q1: Losers from the first qualifying round
  - PR: Losers from the preliminary round (F: final; SF: semi-finals)

Qualified teams for 2019–20 UEFA Europa League (by entry round) Round of 32
| (Belgium) Club Brugge (UCL GS) | (Ukraine) Shakhtar Donetsk (UCL GS) | (Austria) Red Bull Salzburg (UCL GS) | (Portugal) Benfica (UCL GS) |
| (Greece) Olympiacos (UCL GS) | (Germany) Bayer Leverkusen (UCL GS) | (Italy) Inter Milan (UCL GS) | (Netherlands) Ajax (UCL GS) |

Group stage
| (Spain) Getafe (5th) | (Germany) VfL Wolfsburg (6th) | (Turkey) Beşiktaş (3rd) | (Russia) Krasnodar (UCL PO) |
| (Spain) Sevilla (6th) | (France) Rennes (CW) | (Austria) Wolfsberger AC (3rd) | (Austria) LASK (UCL PO) |
| (England) Arsenal (5th) | (France) Saint-Étienne (4th) | (Switzerland) Lugano (3rd) | (Portugal) Porto (UCL Q3) |
| (England) Manchester United (6th) | (Russia) CSKA Moscow (4th) | (Switzerland) Young Boys (UCL PO) | (Ukraine) Dynamo Kyiv (UCL Q3) |
| (Italy) Lazio (CW) | (Portugal) Sporting CP (CW) | (Cyprus) APOEL (UCL PO) | (Turkey) İstanbul Başakşehir (UCL Q3) |
| (Italy) Roma (6th) | (Ukraine) Oleksandriya (3rd) | (Romania) CFR Cluj (UCL PO) | (Switzerland) Basel (UCL Q3) |
| (Germany) Borussia Mönchengladbach (5th) | (Belgium) Standard Liège (3rd) | (Norway) Rosenborg (UCL PO) | |

Play-off round
| Champions Path | | Main Path |
|---|---|---|
| (Greece) PAOK (UCL Q3) | (Scotland) Celtic (UCL Q3) | |
| (Denmark) Copenhagen (UCL Q3) | (Slovenia) Maribor (UCL Q3) | |
| (Azerbaijan) Qarabağ (UCL Q3) | (Hungary) Ferencváros (UCL Q3) | |

Third qualifying round
| Champions Path | | Main Path | |
|---|---|---|---|
| (Israel) Maccabi Tel Aviv (UCL Q2) | (Estonia) Nõmme Kalju (UCL Q2) | (Russia) Spartak Moscow (5th) | (Netherlands) Feyenoord (3rd) |
| (Sweden) AIK (UCL Q2) | (Montenegro) Sutjeska (UCL Q2) | (Portugal) Braga (4th) | (Greece) AEK Athens (3rd) |
| (Belarus) BATE Borisov (UCL Q2) | (Georgia (country)) Saburtalo Tbilisi (UCL Q2) | (Ukraine) Mariupol (4th) | (Croatia) Rijeka (CW) |
| (Finland) HJK (UCL Q2) | (Malta) Valletta (UCL Q2) | (Belgium) Antwerp (PW) | (Denmark) Midtjylland (CW) |
| (Republic of Ireland) Dundalk (UCL Q2) | (Wales) The New Saints (UCL Q2) | (Turkey) Trabzonspor (4th) | (Israel) Bnei Yehuda (CW) |
| | (Bosnia and Herzegovina) Sarajevo (UCL Q1) | Austria Wien (4th) | (Czech Republic) Viktoria Plzeň (UCL Q2) |
| | | (Switzerland) Thun (4th) | (Netherlands) PSV Eindhoven (UCL Q2) |
| | | (Czech Republic) Sparta Prague (3rd) | |

Second qualifying round
| Champions Path | | Main Path | |
|---|---|---|---|
| (Poland) Piast Gliwice (UCL Q1) | (Lithuania) Sūduva (UCL Q1) | (Spain) Espanyol (7th) | (Netherlands) AZ (4th) |
| (Bulgaria) Ludogorets Razgrad (UCL Q1) | Ararat-Armenia (UCL Q1) | (England) Wolverhampton Wanderers (7th) | (Netherlands) Utrecht (PW) |
| (Kazakhstan) Astana (UCL Q1) | (Luxembourg) F91 Dudelange (UCL Q1) | (Italy) Torino (7th) | (Greece) Atromitos (4th) |
| (Slovakia) Slovan Bratislava (UCL Q1) | (Northern Ireland) Linfield (UCL Q1) | (Germany) Eintracht Frankfurt (7th) | (Greece) Aris (5th) |
| (Moldova) Sheriff Tiraspol (UCL Q1) | (Faroe Islands) HB (UCL Q1) | (France) Strasbourg (LC) | (Croatia) Osijek (3rd) |
| (Albania) Partizani (UCL Q1) | (Kosovo) Feronikeli (UCL Q1) | (Russia) Arsenal Tula (6th) | (Denmark) Esbjerg (3rd) |
| (Iceland) Valur (UCL Q1) | (Andorra) FC Santa Coloma (UCL PR F) | (Portugal) Vitória de Guimarães (5th) | (Cyprus) AEL Limassol (CW) |
| (North Macedonia) Shkëndija (UCL Q1) | (Gibraltar) Lincoln Red Imps (UCL PR SF) | (Ukraine) Zorya Luhansk (5th) | (Romania) Viitorul Constanța (CW) |
| (Latvia) Riga (UCL Q1) | (San Marino) Tre Penne (UCL PR SF) | (Belgium) Gent (5th) | (Poland) Lechia Gdańsk (CW) |
| | | (Turkey) Yeni Malatyaspor (5th) | (Sweden) BK Häcken (CW) |
| | | (Austria) Sturm Graz (PW) | (Azerbaijan) Gabala (CW) |
| | | (Switzerland) Luzern (5th) | (Bulgaria) Lokomotiv Plovdiv (CW) |
| | | (Czech Republic) Jablonec (4th) | (Serbia) Partizan (CW) |
| | | (Czech Republic) Mladá Boleslav (PW) | |

First qualifying round
| (Croatia) Hajduk Split (4th) | (Belarus) Dinamo Minsk (3rd) | (Iceland) Breiðablik (2nd) | (Estonia) Flora (3rd) |
| (Denmark) Brøndby (PW) | (Belarus) Vitebsk (4th) | (Iceland) KR (4th) | (Lithuania) Žalgiris (CW) |
| (Israel) Maccabi Haifa (2nd) | (Kazakhstan) Kairat (CW) | (Hungary) MOL Fehérvár (CW) | (Lithuania) Riteriai (3rd) |
| (Israel) Hapoel Be'er Sheva (3rd) | (Kazakhstan) Tobol (3rd) | (Hungary) Debrecen (3rd) | (Lithuania) Kauno Žalgiris (5th) |
| (Cyprus) AEK Larnaca (2nd) | (Kazakhstan) Ordabasy (4th) | (Hungary) Honvéd (4th) | (Montenegro) Budućnost Podgorica (CW) |
| (Cyprus) Apollon Limassol (3rd) | (Norway) Molde (2nd) | (North Macedonia) Akademija Pandev (CW) | (Montenegro) Zeta (3rd) |
| (Romania) FCSB (2nd) | (Norway) Brann (3rd) | (North Macedonia) Shkupi (4th) | (Montenegro) Titograd Podgorica (4th) |
| (Romania) Universitatea Craiova (4th) | (Norway) Haugesund (4th) | (North Macedonia) Makedonija GP (5th) | (Georgia (country)) Torpedo Kutaisi (CW) |
| (Poland) Legia Warsaw (2nd) | (Slovenia) Olimpija Ljubljana (CW) | (Finland) Inter Turku (CW) | (Georgia (country)) Dinamo Tbilisi (2nd) |
| (Poland) Cracovia (4th) | (Slovenia) Domžale (3rd) | (Finland) RoPS (2nd) | (Georgia (country)) Chikhura Sachkhere (4th) |
| (Sweden) IFK Norrköping (2nd) | (Slovenia) Mura (4th) | (Finland) KuPS (3rd) | (Armenia) Alashkert (CW) |
| (Sweden) Malmö FF (3rd) | (Liechtenstein) Vaduz (CW) | (Republic of Ireland) Cork City (2nd) | (Armenia) Pyunik (2nd) |
| (Azerbaijan) Neftçi (2nd) | (Slovakia) Spartak Trnava (CW) | (Republic of Ireland) Shamrock Rovers (3rd) | (Armenia) Banants (3rd) |
| (Azerbaijan) Sabail (3rd) | (Slovakia) DAC Dunajská Streda (2nd) | (Republic of Ireland) St Patrick's Athletic (5th) | (Malta) Balzan (CW) |
| (Bulgaria) CSKA Sofia (2nd) | (Slovakia) Ružomberok (3rd) | (Bosnia and Herzegovina) Zrinjski Mostar (2nd) | (Malta) Hibernians (2nd) |
| (Bulgaria) Levski Sofia (PW) | (Moldova) Milsami Orhei (2nd) | (Bosnia and Herzegovina) Široki Brijeg (3rd) | (Malta) Gżira United (3rd) |
| (Serbia) Radnički Niš (2nd) | (Moldova) Petrocub Hîncești (3rd) | (Bosnia and Herzegovina) Radnik Bijeljina (5th) | (Luxembourg) Fola Esch (2nd) |
| (Serbia) Čukarički (4th) | (Moldova) Speranța Nisporeni (4th) | (Latvia) Ventspils (2nd) | (Luxembourg) Jeunesse Esch (3rd) |
| (Scotland) Rangers (2nd) | (Albania) Kukësi (CW) | (Latvia) RFS (3rd) | (Northern Ireland) Crusaders (CW) |
| (Scotland) Kilmarnock (3rd) | (Albania) Teuta (3rd) | (Latvia) Liepāja (4th) | (Wales) Connah's Quay Nomads (2nd) |
| (Scotland) Aberdeen (4th) | (Albania) Laçi (6th) | (Estonia) Narva Trans (CW) | (Faroe Islands) B36 (CW) |
| (Belarus) Shakhtyor Soligorsk (CW) | (Iceland) Stjarnan (CW) | (Estonia) FCI Levadia (2nd) | |

Preliminary round
| (Luxembourg) Progrès Niederkorn (4th) | (Wales) Cardiff Metropolitan University (PW) | (Gibraltar) St Joseph's (3rd) | (San Marino) La Fiorita (2nd) |
| (Northern Ireland) Ballymena United (2nd) | (Faroe Islands) NSÍ (2nd) | (Andorra) Engordany (CW) | (Kosovo) Prishtina (2nd) |
| (Northern Ireland) Cliftonville (PW) | (Faroe Islands) KÍ (4th) | (Andorra) Sant Julià (2nd) | |
| (Wales) Barry Town United (3rd) | (Gibraltar) Europa (CW) | (San Marino) Tre Fiori (CW) | |

One team not playing a national top division took part in the competition; Vaduz (representing Liechtenstein) played in 2019–20 Swiss Challenge League, which is Switzerland's 2nd tier.

Notes

1. Albania (ALB): Skënderbeu would have qualified for the Europa League first qualifying round as the fourth-placed team of the 2018–19 Albanian Superliga, but were banned from entering UEFA competitions. As a result, the berth was given to the sixth-placed team of the league, Laçi, since the fifth-placed team of the league, Flamurtari, failed to obtain a UEFA licence.
2. Belgium (BEL): Mechelen would have qualified for the Europa League group stage as the winners of the 2018–19 Belgian Cup, but were found guilty on match-fixing as part of the 2017–19 Belgian football fraud scandal, and thus prohibited by the Royal Belgian Football Association to take part in the 2019–20 European competitions. Mechelen appealed the decision, but the final ruling was announced on 17 July 2019 by the Belgian Arbitration Court for Sports, and Mechelen remained banned, and were subsequently replaced by UEFA. As a result, the third-placed team of the 2018–19 Belgian First Division A, Standard Liège, entered the group stage instead of the third qualifying round, the Europa League play-off winners of the league, Antwerp, entered the third qualifying round instead of the second qualifying round, and the second qualifying round berth was given to the fifth-placed team of the league, Gent.
3. Bosnia and Herzegovina (BIH): Željezničar would have qualified for the Europa League first qualifying round as the fourth placed team of the 2018–19 Premier League of Bosnia and Herzegovina, but failed to obtain a UEFA licence. As a result, the berth was given to the fifth-placed team of the league, Radnik Bijeljina.
4. Italy (ITA): Milan qualified for the Europa League group stage as the fifth-placed of the 2018–19 Serie A, but were found guilty of breaching Financial Fair Play rules and were excluded from competing in European competitions in 2019–20. As a result, the sixth-placed team of the 2018–19 Serie A, Roma, entered the group stage instead of the second qualifying round, and the second qualifying round berth was given to the seventh-placed team of the league, Torino.
5. Lithuania (LTU): Stumbras would have qualified for the Europa League first qualifying round as the fourth placed team of the 2018 A Lyga, but had their UEFA licence stripped. As a result, the berth was given to the fifth-placed team of the league, Kauno Žalgiris.
6. North Macedonia (MKD): Vardar would have qualified for the Europa League first qualifying round as the runners-up of the 2018–19 Macedonian First Football League, but failed to obtain a UEFA licence. As a result, the berth was given to the fifth-placed team of the league, Makedonija GP.
7. Republic of Ireland (IRL): Waterford would have qualified for the Europa League first qualifying round as the fourth-placed team of the 2018 League of Ireland Premier Division, but were ruled by UEFA to have not passed the "three-year rule" as the club were reformed in 2016. As a result, the berth was given to the fifth-placed team of the league, St Patrick's Athletic.
8. Champions League (UCL Q1): Sarajevo were drawn to receive a bye to the third qualifying round, as one fewer loser from the Champions League first qualifying round were transferred to the Europa League second qualifying round (Champions Path), due to a Champions League group stage berth vacated by the Champions League title holders.

== Round and draw dates ==
The schedule of the competition was as follows (all draws were held at the UEFA headquarters in Nyon, Switzerland, unless stated otherwise). Matches could also be played on Tuesdays or Wednesdays instead of the regular Thursdays due to scheduling conflicts.

The competition was suspended on 17 March 2020 due to the COVID-19 pandemic in Europe. A working group was set up by UEFA to decide the calendar of the remainder of the season. On 17 June 2020, UEFA announced the revised schedule for the quarter-finals, semi-finals and final of the competition, to be played in single-leg matches.

Schedule for 2019–20 UEFA Europa League
| Phase | Round | Draw date | First leg | Second leg |
|---|---|---|---|---|
| Qualifying | Preliminary round | 11 June 2019 | 27 June 2019 | 4 July 2019 |
| Qualifying | First qualifying round | 18 June 2019 | 11 July 2019 | 18 July 2019 |
| Qualifying | Second qualifying round | 19 June 2019 | 25 July 2019 | 1 August 2019 |
| Qualifying | Third qualifying round | 22 July 2019 | 8 August 2019 | 15 August 2019 |
| Play-off | Play-off round | 5 August 2019 | 22 August 2019 | 29 August 2019 |
| Group stage | Matchday 1 | 30 August 2019 (Monaco) | 19 September 2019 | |
| Group stage | Matchday 2 | 30 August 2019 (Monaco) | 3 October 2019 | |
| Group stage | Matchday 3 | 30 August 2019 (Monaco) | 24 October 2019 | |
| Group stage | Matchday 4 | 30 August 2019 (Monaco) | 7 November 2019 | |
| Group stage | Matchday 5 | 30 August 2019 (Monaco) | 28 November 2019 | |
| Group stage | Matchday 6 | 30 August 2019 (Monaco) | 12 December 2019 | |
| Knockout phase | Round of 32 | 16 December 2019 | 20 February 2020 | 27 February 2020 |
| Knockout phase | Round of 16 | 28 February 2020 | 12 March 2020 | 5–6 August 2020 |
| Knockout phase | Quarter-finals | 10 July 2020 | 10–11 August 2020 | |
| Knockout phase | Semi-finals | 10 July 2020 | 16–17 August 2020 | |
| Knockout phase | Final | 10 July 2020 | 21 August 2020 at RheinEnergieStadion, Cologne | |

The original schedule of the competition, as planned before the pandemic, was as follows.

Original schedule for 2019–20 UEFA Europa League
| Phase | Round | Draw date | First leg | Second leg |
|---|---|---|---|---|
| Qualifying | Preliminary round | 11 June 2019 | 27 June 2019 | 4 July 2019 |
| Qualifying | First qualifying round | 18 June 2019 | 11 July 2019 | 18 July 2019 |
| Qualifying | Second qualifying round | 19 June 2019 | 25 July 2019 | 1 August 2019 |
| Qualifying | Third qualifying round | 22 July 2019 | 8 August 2019 | 15 August 2019 |
| Play-off | Play-off round | 5 August 2019 | 22 August 2019 | 29 August 2019 |
| Group stage | Matchday 1 | 30 August 2019 (Monaco) | 19 September 2019 | |
| Group stage | Matchday 2 | 30 August 2019 (Monaco) | 3 October 2019 | |
| Group stage | Matchday 3 | 30 August 2019 (Monaco) | 24 October 2019 | |
| Group stage | Matchday 4 | 30 August 2019 (Monaco) | 7 November 2019 | |
| Group stage | Matchday 5 | 30 August 2019 (Monaco) | 28 November 2019 | |
| Group stage | Matchday 6 | 30 August 2019 (Monaco) | 12 December 2019 | |
| Knockout phase | Round of 32 | 16 December 2019 | 20 February 2020 | 27 February 2020 |
| Knockout phase | Round of 16 | 28 February 2020 | 12 March 2020 | 19 March 2020 |
| Knockout phase | Quarter-finals | 20 March 2020 | 9 April 2020 | 16 April 2020 |
| Knockout phase | Semi-finals | 20 March 2020 | 30 April 2020 | 7 May 2020 |
| Knockout phase | Final | 20 March 2020 | 27 May 2020 at Gdańsk Stadium, Gdańsk | |

== Effects of the COVID-19 pandemic ==
Due to the varying rates of transmission of COVID-19 across European countries during the time of the Round of 16 first leg ties, different matches were affected in different ways. Because of this severity of the COVID-19 pandemic in Italy at the time, the games involving Inter Milan and A.S. Roma were postponed, whereas games hosted in Greece, Germany, and Austria went ahead but behind closed doors. Games hosted in Turkey and Scotland went ahead as normal. On 15 March, UEFA announced that none of the Round of 16 second leg ties would go ahead in the following week, postponing them indefinitely, with a taskforce convened to reschedule the rest of the season. On 23 March, it was announced that the Gdańsk Stadium in Gdańsk, Poland would no longer host the 2020 final, originally scheduled for 27 May, but would host the 2021 final instead.

On 17 June it was announced that the Europa League would return on 5 August and conclude on 21 August, with a last-eight tournament to be held across four venues in Germany. The remainder of the competition would be played in a mini-tournament style with remaining fixture to be played as single legged ties except for the Round of 16 fixtures where the first leg had already been played. All remaining ties of the competition were played behind closed doors due to the remaining presence of the COVID-19 pandemic in Europe.

=== Final tournament venues ===
| Cologne | Duisburg |
|---|---|
| RheinEnergieStadion (final venue) | MSV-Arena |
| Capacity: 49,698 | Capacity: 31,514 |
Location of venues within North Rhine-Westphalia, Germany
| Düsseldorf | Gelsenkirchen |
| Merkur Spiel-Arena | Arena AufSchalke |
| Capacity: 54,600 | Capacity: 62,271 |

== Qualifying rounds ==
In the qualifying rounds and the play-off round, teams were divided into seeded and unseeded teams based on their 2019 UEFA club coefficients, and then drawn into two-legged home-and-away ties. Teams from the same association could not be drawn against each other.

=== Preliminary round ===
In the preliminary round, teams were divided into seeded and unseeded teams based on their 2019 UEFA club coefficients, and then drawn into two-legged home-and-away ties. Teams from the same association could not be drawn against each other. The draw for the preliminary round was held on 11 June 2019. The first legs were played on 27 June, and the second legs on 2 and 4 July 2019.

| Team 1 | Agg. | Team 2 | 1st leg | 2nd leg |
|---|---|---|---|---|
| Progrès Niederkorn (Luxembourg) | 2–2 (a) | (Wales) Cardiff Metropolitan University | 1–0 | 1–2 |
| La Fiorita (San Marino) | 1–3 | (Andorra) Engordany | 0–1 | 1–2 |
| Sant Julià (Andorra) | 3–6 | (Gibraltar) Europa | 3–2 | 0–4 |
| Ballymena United (Northern Ireland) | 2–0 | (Faroe Islands) NSÍ | 2–0 | 0–0 |
| Prishtina (Kosovo) | 1–3 | (Gibraltar) St Joseph's | 1–1 | 0–2 |
| KÍ (Faroe Islands) | 9–1 (Note: Order of legs reversed after original draw.) | (San Marino) Tre Fiori | 5–1 | 4–0 |
| Barry Town United (Wales) | 0–4 | (Northern Ireland) Cliftonville | 0–0 | 0–4 |

=== First qualifying round ===
The draw for the first qualifying round was held on 18 June 2019. The first legs were played on 9, 10 and 11 July, and the second legs on 16, 17 and 18 July 2019.

| Team 1 | Agg. | Team 2 | 1st leg | 2nd leg |
|---|---|---|---|---|
| Malmö FF (Sweden) | 11–0 | (Northern Ireland) Ballymena United | 7–0 | 4–0 |
| Connah's Quay Nomads (Wales) | 3–2 | (Scotland) Kilmarnock | 1–2 | 2–0 |
| KuPS (Finland) | 3–1 (Note: Order of legs reversed after original draw.) | (Belarus) Vitebsk | 2–0 | 1–1 |
| Breiðablik (Iceland) | 1–2 | (Liechtenstein) Vaduz | 0–0 | 1–2 |
| Brann (Norway) | 3–4 | (Republic of Ireland) Shamrock Rovers | 2–2 | 1–2 |
| Ordabasy (Kazakhstan) | 3–0 | (Georgia (country)) Torpedo Kutaisi | 1–0 | 2–0 |
| Europa (Gibraltar) | 0–3 | (Poland) Legia Warsaw | 0–0 | 0–3 |
| CSKA Sofia (Bulgaria) | 4–0 | (Montenegro) Titograd Podgorica | 4–0 | 0–0 |
| Gżira United (Malta) | 3–3 (a) | (Croatia) Hajduk Split | 0–2 | 3–1 |
| Flora (Estonia) | 4–2 | (Serbia) Radnički Niš | 2–0 | 2–2 |
| Maccabi Haifa (Israel) | 5–2 | (Slovenia) Mura | 2–0 | 3–2 |
| Debrecen (Hungary) | 4–1 | (Albania) Kukësi | 3–0 | 1–1 |
| Čukarički (Serbia) | 8–0 | (Armenia) Banants | 3–0 | 5–0 |
| Jeunesse Esch (Luxembourg) | 1–1 (a) | (Kazakhstan) Tobol | 0–0 | 1–1 |
| FCSB (Romania) | 4–1 | (Moldova) Milsami Orhei | 2–0 | 2–1 |
| Crusaders (Northern Ireland) | 5–2 | (Faroe Islands) B36 | 2–0 | 3–2 |
| Brøndby (Denmark) | 4–3 | (Finland) Inter Turku | 4–1 | 0–2 |
| Molde (Norway) | 7–1 | (Iceland) KR | 7–1 | 0–0 |
| St Joseph's (Gibraltar) | 0–10 | (Scotland) Rangers | 0–4 | 0–6 |
| Cork City (Republic of Ireland) | 2–3 | (Luxembourg) Progrès Niederkorn | 0–2 | 2–1 |
| Ružomberok (Slovakia) | 0–4 | (Bulgaria) Levski Sofia | 0–2 | 0–2 |
| Akademija Pandev (North Macedonia) | 0–6 | (Bosnia and Herzegovina) Zrinjski Mostar | 0–3 | 0–3 |
| Speranța Nisporeni (Moldova) | 0–9 | (Azerbaijan) Neftçi | 0–3 | 0–6 |
| Zeta (Montenegro) | 1–5 | (Hungary) MOL Fehérvár | 1–5 | 0–0 |
| Shakhtyor Soligorsk (Belarus) | 2–0 | (Malta) Hibernians | 1–0 | 1–0 |
| Olimpija Ljubljana (Slovenia) | 4–3 | (Latvia) RFS | 2–3 | 2–0 |
| Honvéd (Hungary) | 4–2 | (Lithuania) Žalgiris | 3–1 | 1–1 |
| Alashkert (Armenia) | 6–1 | (North Macedonia) Makedonija GP | 3–1 | 3–0 |
| Radnik Bijeljina (Bosnia and Herzegovina) | 2–2 (2–3 p) | (Slovakia) Spartak Trnava | 2–0 | 0–2 (a.e.t.) |
| Fola Esch (Luxembourg) | 2–4 | (Georgia (country)) Chikhura Sachkhere | 1–2 | 1–2 |
| Dinamo Tbilisi (Georgia (country)) | 7–0 | (Andorra) Engordany | 6–0 | 1–0 |
| Široki Brijeg (Bosnia and Herzegovina) | 2–4 | (Kazakhstan) Kairat | 1–2 | 1–2 |
| DAC Dunajská Streda (Slovakia) | 3–3 (a) | (Poland) Cracovia | 1–1 | 2–2 (a.e.t.) |
| Kauno Žalgiris (Lithuania) | 0–6 | (Cyprus) Apollon Limassol | 0–2 | 0–4 |
| Ventspils (Latvia) | 3–1 | (Albania) Teuta | 3–0 | 0–1 |
| Stjarnan (Iceland) | 4–4 (a) | (Estonia) FCI Levadia | 2–1 | 2–3 (a.e.t.) |
| Cliftonville (Northern Ireland) | 1–6 | (Norway) Haugesund | 0–1 | 1–5 |
| Riteriai (Lithuania) | 1–1 (a) | (Faroe Islands) KÍ | 1–1 | 0–0 |
| Liepāja (Latvia) | 3–2 | (Belarus) Dinamo Minsk | 1–1 | 2–1 |
| St Patrick's Athletic (Republic of Ireland) | 1–4 | (Sweden) IFK Norrköping | 0–2 | 1–2 |
| Aberdeen (Scotland) | 4–2 | (Finland) RoPS | 2–1 | 2–1 |
| Balzan (Malta) | 3–5 | (Slovenia) Domžale | 3–4 | 0–1 |
| Laçi (Albania) | 1–2 | (Israel) Hapoel Be'er Sheva | 1–1 | 0–1 |
| Narva Trans (Estonia) | 1–6 | (Montenegro) Budućnost Podgorica | 0–2 | 1–4 |
| Sabail (Azerbaijan) | 4–6 | (Romania) Universitatea Craiova | 2–3 | 2–3 |
| Pyunik (Armenia) | 5–4 | (North Macedonia) Shkupi | 3–3 | 2–1 |
| AEK Larnaca (Cyprus) | 2–0 | (Moldova) Petrocub Hîncești | 1–0 | 1–0 |

=== Second qualifying round ===
The second qualifying round was split into two separate sections: Champions Path (for league champions) and League Path (for cup winners and league non-champions). The draw for the second qualifying round was held on 19 June 2019. The first legs were played on 23, 24 and 25 July, and the second legs on 30, 31 July and 1 August 2019.

| Team 1 | Agg. | Team 2 | 1st leg | 2nd leg |
|---|---|---|---|---|
Champions Path
| Sarajevo (Bosnia and Herzegovina) | Bye | N/A | — | — |
| Tre Penne (San Marino) | 0–10 | (Lithuania) Sūduva | 0–5 | 0–5 |
| Piast Gliwice (Poland) | 4–4 (a) | (Latvia) Riga | 3–2 | 1–2 |
| Partizani (Albania) | 1–2 | (Moldova) Sheriff Tiraspol | 0–1 | 1–1 |
| Ararat-Armenia | 4–1 | (Gibraltar) Lincoln Red Imps | 2–0 | 2–1 |
| Valur (Iceland) | 1–5 | (Bulgaria) Ludogorets Razgrad | 1–1 | 0–4 |
| Slovan Bratislava (Slovakia) | 4–1 | (Kosovo) Feronikeli | 2–1 | 2–0 |
| FC Santa Coloma (Andorra) | 1–4 | (Kazakhstan) Astana | 0–0 | 1–4 |
| HB (Faroe Islands) | 2–3 | (Northern Ireland) Linfield | 2–2 | 0–1 |
| Shkëndija (North Macedonia) | 2–3 | (Luxembourg) F91 Dudelange | 1–2 | 1–1 |
Main Path
| IFK Norrköping (Sweden) | 3–0 | (Latvia) Liepāja | 2–0 | 1–0 |
| Hapoel Be'er Sheva (Israel) | 3–1 | (Kazakhstan) Kairat | 2–0 | 1–1 |
| Arsenal Tula (Russia) | 0–4 | (Azerbaijan) Neftçi | 0–1 | 0–3 |
| Espanyol (Spain) | 7–1 | (Iceland) Stjarnan | 4–0 | 3–1 |
| DAC Dunajská Streda (Slovakia) | 3–5 | (Greece) Atromitos | 1–2 | 2–3 |
| Haugesund (Norway) | 3–2 | (Austria) Sturm Graz | 2–0 | 1–2 |
| AEK Larnaca (Cyprus) | 7–0 | (Bulgaria) Levski Sofia | 3–0 | 4–0 |
| Legia Warsaw (Poland) | 1–0 | (Finland) KuPS | 1–0 | 0–0 |
| Utrecht (Netherlands) | 2–3 | (Bosnia and Herzegovina) Zrinjski Mostar | 1–1 | 1–2 (a.e.t.) |
| Pyunik (Armenia) | 2–1 | (Czech Republic) Jablonec | 2–1 | 0–0 |
| Lechia Gdańsk (Poland) | 3–5 | (Denmark) Brøndby | 2–1 | 1–4 (a.e.t.) |
| MOL Fehérvár (Hungary) | 1–2 | (Liechtenstein) Vaduz | 1–0 | 0–2 (a.e.t.) |
| Gabala (Azerbaijan) | 0–5 | (Georgia (country)) Dinamo Tbilisi | 0–2 | 0–3 |
| Yeni Malatyaspor (Turkey) | 3–2 | (Slovenia) Olimpija Ljubljana | 2–2 | 1–0 |
| Flora (Estonia) | 2–4 | (Germany) Eintracht Frankfurt | 1–2 | 1–2 |
| Domžale (Slovenia) | 4–5 | (Sweden) Malmö FF | 2–2 | 2–3 |
| Molde (Norway) | 3–1 | (Serbia) Čukarički | 0–0 | 3–1 |
| Chikhura Sachkhere (Georgia (country)) | 1–6 (Note: Order of legs reversed after original draw.) | (Scotland) Aberdeen | 1–1 | 0–5 |
| Gent (Belgium) | 7–5 | (Romania) Viitorul Constanța | 6–3 | 1–2 |
| Budućnost Podgorica (Montenegro) | 1–4 | (Ukraine) Zorya Luhansk | 1–3 | 0–1 |
| CSKA Sofia (Bulgaria) | 1–1 (4–3 p) | (Croatia) Osijek | 1–0 | 0–1 (a.e.t.) |
| Torino (Italy) | 7–1 | (Hungary) Debrecen | 3–0 | 4–1 |
| Luzern (Switzerland) | 2–0 | (Faroe Islands) KÍ | 1–0 | 1–0 |
| Rangers (Scotland) | 2–0 | (Luxembourg) Progrès Niederkorn | 2–0 | 0–0 |
| Ventspils (Latvia) | 6–2 | (Malta) Gżira United | 4–0 | 2–2 |
| Strasbourg (France) | 4–3 | (Israel) Maccabi Haifa | 3–1 | 1–2 |
| Mladá Boleslav (Czech Republic) | 4–3 | (Kazakhstan) Ordabasy | 1–1 | 3–2 |
| Shamrock Rovers (Republic of Ireland) | 3–4 | (Cyprus) Apollon Limassol | 2–1 | 1–3 (a.e.t.) |
| AZ (Netherlands) | 3–0 | (Sweden) BK Häcken | 0–0 | 3–0 |
| Alashkert (Armenia) | 3–5 | (Romania) FCSB | 0–3 | 3–2 |
| Lokomotiv Plovdiv (Bulgaria) | 3–3 (a) | (Slovakia) Spartak Trnava | 2–0 | 1–3 |
| Wolverhampton Wanderers (England) | 6–1 | (Northern Ireland) Crusaders | 2–0 | 4–1 |
| Aris (Greece) | 1–0 | (Cyprus) AEL Limassol | 0–0 | 1–0 |
| Jeunesse Esch (Luxembourg) | 0–5 | (Portugal) Vitória de Guimarães | 0–1 | 0–4 |
| Honvéd (Hungary) | 0–0 (1–3 p) | (Romania) Universitatea Craiova | 0–0 | 0–0 (a.e.t.) |
| Shakhtyor Soligorsk (Belarus) | 2–0 | (Denmark) Esbjerg | 2–0 | 0–0 |
| Connah's Quay Nomads (Wales) | 0–4 | (Serbia) Partizan | 0–1 | 0–3 |

=== Third qualifying round ===
The third qualifying round was split into two separate sections: Champions Path (for league champions) and League Path (for cup winners and league non-champions). The draw for the third qualifying round was held on 22 July 2019. The first legs were played on 6, 7 and 8 August, and the second legs on 13, 14 and 15 August 2019.

| Team 1 | Agg. | Team 2 | 1st leg | 2nd leg |
|---|---|---|---|---|
Champions Path
| Sutjeska (Montenegro) | 3–5 | (Northern Ireland) Linfield | 1–2 | 2–3 |
| Maccabi Tel Aviv (Israel) | 2–4 | (Lithuania) Sūduva | 1–2 | 1–2 |
| Ararat-Armenia | 3–2 | (Georgia (country)) Saburtalo Tbilisi | 1–2 | 2–0 |
| Riga (Latvia) | 3–3 (a) | (Finland) HJK | 1–1 | 2–2 |
| Ludogorets Razgrad (Bulgaria) | 9–0 | (Wales) The New Saints | 5–0 | 4–0 |
| Sarajevo (Bosnia and Herzegovina) | 1–2 | (Belarus) BATE Borisov | 1–2 | 0–0 |
| F91 Dudelange (Luxembourg) | 4–1 | (Estonia) Nõmme Kalju | 3–1 | 1–0 |
| Astana (Kazakhstan) | 9–1 | (Malta) Valletta | 5–1 | 4–0 |
| Sheriff Tiraspol (Moldova) | 2–3 | (Sweden) AIK | 1–2 | 1–1 |
| Slovan Bratislava (Slovakia) | 4–1 | (Republic of Ireland) Dundalk | 1–0 | 3–1 |
Main Path
| IFK Norrköping (Sweden) | 2–4 | (Israel) Hapoel Be'er Sheva | 1–1 | 1–3 |
| Torino (Italy) | 6–1 | (Belarus) Shakhtyor Soligorsk | 5–0 | 1–1 |
| Antwerp (Belgium) | 2–2 (a) | (Czech Republic) Viktoria Plzeň | 1–0 | 1–2 (a.e.t.) |
| Austria Wien | 2–5 | (Cyprus) Apollon Limassol | 1–2 | 1–3 |
| Feyenoord (Netherlands) | 5–1 | (Georgia (country)) Dinamo Tbilisi | 4–0 | 1–1 |
| Brøndby (Denmark) | 3–7 | (Portugal) Braga | 2–4 | 1–3 |
| Molde (Norway) | 4–3 | (Greece) Aris | 3–0 | 1–3 (a.e.t.) |
| Lokomotiv Plovdiv (Bulgaria) | 0–2 | (France) Strasbourg | 0–1 | 0–1 |
| Thun (Switzerland) | 3–5 | (Russia) Spartak Moscow | 2–3 | 1–2 |
| FCSB (Romania) | 1–0 | (Czech Republic) Mladá Boleslav | 0–0 | 1–0 |
| Pyunik (Armenia) | 0–8 | (England) Wolverhampton Wanderers | 0–4 | 0–4 |
| Midtjylland (Denmark) | 3–7 | (Scotland) Rangers | 2–4 | 1–3 |
| Mariupol (Ukraine) | 0–4 | (Netherlands) AZ | 0–0 | 0–4 |
| AEK Larnaca (Cyprus) | 1–4 | (Belgium) Gent | 1–1 | 0–3 |
| Legia Warsaw (Poland) | 2–0 | (Greece) Atromitos | 0–0 | 2–0 |
| Haugesund (Norway) | 0–1 | (Netherlands) PSV Eindhoven | 0–1 | 0–0 |
| Rijeka (Croatia) | 4–0 | (Scotland) Aberdeen | 2–0 | 2–0 |
| Ventspils (Latvia) | 0–9 | (Portugal) Vitória de Guimarães | 0–3 | 0–6 |
| Vaduz (Liechtenstein) | 0–6 | (Germany) Eintracht Frankfurt | 0–5 | 0–1 |
| Partizan (Serbia) | 3–2 | (Turkey) Yeni Malatyaspor | 3–1 | 0–1 |
| Malmö FF (Sweden) | 3–1 | (Bosnia and Herzegovina) Zrinjski Mostar | 3–0 | 0–1 |
| CSKA Sofia (Bulgaria) | 1–2 | (Ukraine) Zorya Luhansk | 1–1 | 0–1 |
| Neftçi (Azerbaijan) | 3–4 | (Israel) Bnei Yehuda | 2–2 | 1–2 |
| Luzern (Switzerland) | 0–6 | (Spain) Espanyol | 0–3 | 0–3 |
| Sparta Prague (Czech Republic) | 3–4 | (Turkey) Trabzonspor | 2–2 | 1–2 |
| Universitatea Craiova (Romania) | 1–3 | (Greece) AEK Athens | 0–2 | 1–1 |

== Play-off round ==
The play-off round was split into two separate sections: Champions Path (for league champions) and League Path (for cup winners and league non-champions). The draw for the play-off round was held on 5 August 2019. The first legs were played on 22 August, and the second legs on 29 August 2019.

| Team 1 | Agg. | Team 2 | 1st leg | 2nd leg |
|---|---|---|---|---|
Champions Path
| Sūduva (Lithuania) | 2–4 | (Hungary) Ferencváros | 0–0 | 2–4 |
| Copenhagen (Denmark) | 3–2 | (Latvia) Riga | 3–1 | 0–1 |
| Celtic (Scotland) | 6–1 | (Sweden) AIK | 2–0 | 4–1 |
| Ararat-Armenia | 3–3 (4–5 p) | (Luxembourg) F91 Dudelange | 2–1 | 1–2 (a.e.t.) |
| Ludogorets Razgrad (Bulgaria) | 2–2 (a) | (Slovenia) Maribor | 0–0 | 2–2 |
| Linfield (Northern Ireland) | 4–4 (a) | (Azerbaijan) Qarabağ | 3–2 | 1–2 |
| Slovan Bratislava (Slovakia) | 3–3 (a) | (Greece) PAOK | 1–0 | 2–3 |
| Astana (Kazakhstan) | 3–2 | (Belarus) BATE Borisov | 3–0 | 0–2 |
Main Path
| Torino (Italy) | 3–5 | (England) Wolverhampton Wanderers | 2–3 | 1–2 |
| Legia Warsaw (Poland) | 0–1 | (Scotland) Rangers | 0–0 | 0–1 |
| FCSB (Romania) | 0–1 | (Portugal) Vitória de Guimarães | 0–0 | 0–1 |
| PSV Eindhoven (Netherlands) | 7–0 | (Cyprus) Apollon Limassol | 3–0 | 4–0 |
| AEK Athens (Greece) | 3–3 (a) | (Turkey) Trabzonspor | 1–3 | 2–0 |
| Feyenoord (Netherlands) | 6–0 | (Israel) Hapoel Be'er Sheva | 3–0 | 3–0 |
| Gent (Belgium) | 3–2 | (Croatia) Rijeka | 2–1 | 1–1 |
| Espanyol (Spain) | 5–3 | (Ukraine) Zorya Luhansk | 3–1 | 2–2 |
| Partizan (Serbia) | 3–2 | (Norway) Molde | 2–1 | 1–1 |
| Braga (Portugal) | 3–1 | (Russia) Spartak Moscow | 1–0 | 2–1 |
| Malmö FF (Sweden) | 4–0 | (Israel) Bnei Yehuda | 3–0 | 1–0 |
| Strasbourg (France) | 1–3 | (Germany) Eintracht Frankfurt | 1–0 | 0–3 |
| AZ (Netherlands) | 5–2 | (Belgium) Antwerp | 1–1 | 4–1 (a.e.t.) |

== Group stage ==
Location of teams of the 2019–20 UEFA Europa League group stage.
Brown: Group A; Green: Group B; Deep Pink: Group C; Yellow: Group D;
Red: Group E; Cyan: Group F; Blue: Group G; Purple: Group H;
Pink: Group I; Turquoise: Group J; Spring Green: Group K; Orange: Group L.

The draw for the group stage was held on 30 August 2019, 13:00 CEST, at the Grimaldi Forum in Monaco. The 48 teams were drawn into twelve groups of four, with the restriction that teams from the same association could not be drawn against each other. For the draw, the teams were seeded into four pots based on their 2019 UEFA club coefficients.

In each group, teams played against each other home-and-away in a round-robin format. The group winners and runners-up advanced to the round of 32, where they were joined by the eight third-placed teams of the 2019–20 UEFA Champions League group stage. The matchdays were 19 September, 3 October, 24 October, 7 November, 28 November, and 12 December 2019.

A total of 26 national associations were represented in the group stage. Espanyol, Ferencváros, LASK, Oleksandriya, Wolfsberger AC and Wolverhampton Wanderers made their debut appearances in the group stage (although Espanyol and Ferencváros had appeared in the UEFA Cup group stage).

Location of Benelux teams of the 2019–20 UEFA Europa League group stage.
Brown: Group A; Yellow: Group D; Cyan: Group F; Blue: Group G; Pink: Group I; Orange: Group L.

Tiebreakers
Teams were ranked according to points (3 points for a win, 1 point for a draw, 0 points for a loss), and if tied on points, the following tiebreaking criteria were applied, in the order given, to determine the rankings (Regulations Articles 16.01):
1. Points in head-to-head matches among tied teams;
2. Goal difference in head-to-head matches among tied teams;
3. Goals scored in head-to-head matches among tied teams;
4. Away goals scored in head-to-head matches among tied teams;
5. If more than two teams were tied, and after applying all head-to-head criteria above, a subset of teams were still tied, all head-to-head criteria above were reapplied exclusively to this subset of teams;
6. Goal difference in all group matches;
7. Goals scored in all group matches;
8. Away goals scored in all group matches;
9. Wins in all group matches;
10. Away wins in all group matches;
11. Disciplinary points (red card = 3 points, yellow card = 1 point, expulsion for two yellow cards in one match = 3 points);
12. UEFA club coefficient.

=== Group A ===
| Pos | Team | Pld | W | D | L | GF | GA | GD | Pts | Qualification | SEV | APO | QRB | DUD |
|---|---|---|---|---|---|---|---|---|---|---|---|---|---|---|
| 1 | (Spain) Sevilla | 6 | 5 | 0 | 1 | 14 | 3 | +11 | 15 | Advance to knockout phase | — | 1–0 | 2–0 | 3–0 |
| 2 | (Cyprus) APOEL | 6 | 3 | 1 | 2 | 10 | 8 | +2 | 10 | Advance to knockout phase | 1–0 | — | 2–1 | 3–4 |
| 3 | (Azerbaijan) Qarabağ | 6 | 1 | 2 | 3 | 8 | 11 | −3 | 5 | | 0–3 | 2–2 | — | 1–1 |
| 4 | (Luxembourg) F91 Dudelange | 6 | 1 | 1 | 4 | 8 | 18 | −10 | 4 | | 2–5 | 0–2 | 1–4 | — |

Source: UEFA

=== Group B ===
| Pos | Team | Pld | W | D | L | GF | GA | GD | Pts | Qualification | MAL | KOB | DKV | LUG |
|---|---|---|---|---|---|---|---|---|---|---|---|---|---|---|
| 1 | (Sweden) Malmö FF | 6 | 3 | 2 | 1 | 8 | 6 | +2 | 11 | Advance to knockout phase | — | 1–1 | 4–3 | 2–1 |
| 2 | (Denmark) Copenhagen | 6 | 2 | 3 | 1 | 5 | 4 | +1 | 9 | Advance to knockout phase | 0–1 | — | 1–1 | 1–0 |
| 3 | (Ukraine) Dynamo Kyiv | 6 | 1 | 4 | 1 | 7 | 7 | 0 | 7 | | 1–0 | 1–1 | — | 1–1 |
| 4 | (Switzerland) Lugano | 6 | 0 | 3 | 3 | 2 | 5 | −3 | 3 | | 0–0 | 0–1 | 0–0 | — |

Source: UEFA

=== Group C ===
| Pos | Team | Pld | W | D | L | GF | GA | GD | Pts | Qualification | BSL | GET | KRA | TRA |
|---|---|---|---|---|---|---|---|---|---|---|---|---|---|---|
| 1 | (Switzerland) Basel | 6 | 4 | 1 | 1 | 12 | 4 | +8 | 13 | Advance to knockout phase | — | 2–1 | 5–0 | 2–0 |
| 2 | (Spain) Getafe | 6 | 4 | 0 | 2 | 8 | 4 | +4 | 12 | Advance to knockout phase | 0–1 | — | 3–0 | 1–0 |
| 3 | (Russia) Krasnodar | 6 | 3 | 0 | 3 | 7 | 11 | −4 | 9 | | 1–0 | 1–2 | — | 3–1 |
| 4 | (Turkey) Trabzonspor | 6 | 0 | 1 | 5 | 3 | 11 | −8 | 1 | | 2–2 | 0–1 | 0–2 | — |

Source: UEFA

=== Group D ===
| Pos | Team | Pld | W | D | L | GF | GA | GD | Pts | Qualification | LASK | SPO | PSV | ROS |
|---|---|---|---|---|---|---|---|---|---|---|---|---|---|---|
| 1 | (Austria) LASK | 6 | 4 | 1 | 1 | 11 | 4 | +7 | 13 | Advance to knockout phase | — | 3–0 | 4–1 | 1–0 |
| 2 | (Portugal) Sporting CP | 6 | 4 | 0 | 2 | 11 | 7 | +4 | 12 | Advance to knockout phase | 2–1 | — | 4–0 | 1–0 |
| 3 | (Netherlands) PSV Eindhoven | 6 | 2 | 2 | 2 | 9 | 12 | −3 | 8 | | 0–0 | 3–2 | — | 1–1 |
| 4 | (Norway) Rosenborg | 6 | 0 | 1 | 5 | 3 | 11 | −8 | 1 | | 1–2 | 0–2 | 1–4 | — |

Source: UEFA

=== Group E ===
| Pos | Team | Pld | W | D | L | GF | GA | GD | Pts | Qualification | CEL | CLJ | LAZ | REN |
|---|---|---|---|---|---|---|---|---|---|---|---|---|---|---|
| 1 | (Scotland) Celtic | 6 | 4 | 1 | 1 | 10 | 6 | +4 | 13 | Advance to knockout phase | — | 2–0 | 2–1 | 3–1 |
| 2 | (Romania) CFR Cluj | 6 | 4 | 0 | 2 | 6 | 4 | +2 | 12 | Advance to knockout phase | 2–0 | — | 2–1 | 1–0 |
| 3 | (Italy) Lazio | 6 | 2 | 0 | 4 | 6 | 9 | −3 | 6 | | 1–2 | 1–0 | — | 2–1 |
| 4 | (France) Rennes | 6 | 1 | 1 | 4 | 5 | 8 | −3 | 4 | | 1–1 | 0–1 | 2–0 | — |

Source: UEFA

=== Group F ===
| Pos | Team | Pld | W | D | L | GF | GA | GD | Pts | Qualification | ARS | FRA | STL | VSC |
|---|---|---|---|---|---|---|---|---|---|---|---|---|---|---|
| 1 | (England) Arsenal | 6 | 3 | 2 | 1 | 14 | 7 | +7 | 11 | Advance to knockout phase | — | 1–2 | 4–0 | 3–2 |
| 2 | (Germany) Eintracht Frankfurt | 6 | 3 | 0 | 3 | 8 | 10 | −2 | 9 | Advance to knockout phase | 0–3 | — | 2–1 | 2–3 |
| 3 | (Belgium) Standard Liège | 6 | 2 | 2 | 2 | 8 | 10 | −2 | 8 | | 2–2 | 2–1 | — | 2–0 |
| 4 | (Portugal) Vitória de Guimarães | 6 | 1 | 2 | 3 | 7 | 10 | −3 | 5 | | 1–1 | 0–1 | 1–1 | — |

Source: UEFA

=== Group G ===
| Pos | Team | Pld | W | D | L | GF | GA | GD | Pts | Qualification | POR | RAN | YB | FEY |
|---|---|---|---|---|---|---|---|---|---|---|---|---|---|---|
| 1 | (Portugal) Porto | 6 | 3 | 1 | 2 | 8 | 9 | −1 | 10 | Advance to knockout phase | — | 1–1 | 2–1 | 3–2 |
| 2 | (Scotland) Rangers | 6 | 2 | 3 | 1 | 8 | 6 | +2 | 9 | Advance to knockout phase | 2–0 | — | 1–1 | 1–0 |
| 3 | (Switzerland) Young Boys | 6 | 2 | 2 | 2 | 8 | 7 | +1 | 8 | | 1–2 | 2–1 | — | 2–0 |
| 4 | (Netherlands) Feyenoord | 6 | 1 | 2 | 3 | 7 | 9 | −2 | 5 | | 2–0 | 2–2 | 1–1 | — |

Source: UEFA

=== Group H ===
| Pos | Team | Pld | W | D | L | GF | GA | GD | Pts | Qualification | ESP | LUD | FER | CSKA |
|---|---|---|---|---|---|---|---|---|---|---|---|---|---|---|
| 1 | (Spain) Espanyol | 6 | 3 | 2 | 1 | 12 | 4 | +8 | 11 | Advance to knockout phase | — | 6–0 | 1–1 | 0–1 |
| 2 | (Bulgaria) Ludogorets Razgrad | 6 | 2 | 2 | 2 | 10 | 10 | 0 | 8 | Advance to knockout phase | 0–1 | — | 1–1 | 5–1 |
| 3 | (Hungary) Ferencváros | 6 | 1 | 4 | 1 | 5 | 7 | −2 | 7 | | 2–2 | 0–3 | — | 0–0 |
| 4 | (Russia) CSKA Moscow | 6 | 1 | 2 | 3 | 3 | 9 | −6 | 5 | | 0–2 | 1–1 | 0–1 | — |

Source: UEFA

=== Group I ===
| Pos | Team | Pld | W | D | L | GF | GA | GD | Pts | Qualification | GNT | WLF | STE | OLE |
|---|---|---|---|---|---|---|---|---|---|---|---|---|---|---|
| 1 | (Belgium) Gent | 6 | 3 | 3 | 0 | 11 | 7 | +4 | 12 | Advance to knockout phase | — | 2–2 | 3–2 | 2–1 |
| 2 | (Germany) VfL Wolfsburg | 6 | 3 | 2 | 1 | 9 | 7 | +2 | 11 | Advance to knockout phase | 1–3 | — | 1–0 | 3–1 |
| 3 | (France) Saint-Étienne | 6 | 0 | 4 | 2 | 6 | 8 | −2 | 4 | | 0–0 | 1–1 | — | 1–1 |
| 4 | (Ukraine) Oleksandriya | 6 | 0 | 3 | 3 | 6 | 10 | −4 | 3 | | 1–1 | 0–1 | 2–2 | — |

Source: UEFA

=== Group J ===
| Pos | Team | Pld | W | D | L | GF | GA | GD | Pts | Qualification | IBS | ROM | MGB | WLB |
|---|---|---|---|---|---|---|---|---|---|---|---|---|---|---|
| 1 | (Turkey) İstanbul Başakşehir | 6 | 3 | 1 | 2 | 7 | 9 | −2 | 10 | Advance to knockout phase | — | 0–3 | 1–1 | 1–0 |
| 2 | (Italy) Roma | 6 | 2 | 3 | 1 | 12 | 6 | +6 | 9 | Advance to knockout phase | 4–0 | — | 1–1 | 2–2 |
| 3 | (Germany) Borussia Mönchengladbach | 6 | 2 | 2 | 2 | 6 | 9 | −3 | 8 | | 1–2 | 2–1 | — | 0–4 |
| 4 | (Austria) Wolfsberger AC | 6 | 1 | 2 | 3 | 7 | 8 | −1 | 5 | | 0–3 | 1–1 | 0–1 | — |

Source: UEFA

=== Group K ===
| Pos | Team | Pld | W | D | L | GF | GA | GD | Pts | Qualification | BRA | WOL | SLO | BES |
|---|---|---|---|---|---|---|---|---|---|---|---|---|---|---|
| 1 | (Portugal) Braga | 6 | 4 | 2 | 0 | 15 | 9 | +6 | 14 | Advance to knockout phase | — | 3–3 | 2–2 | 3–1 |
| 2 | (England) Wolverhampton Wanderers | 6 | 4 | 1 | 1 | 11 | 5 | +6 | 13 | Advance to knockout phase | 0–1 | — | 1–0 | 4–0 |
| 3 | (Slovakia) Slovan Bratislava | 6 | 1 | 1 | 4 | 10 | 13 | −3 | 4 | | 2–4 | 1–2 | — | 4–2 |
| 4 | (Turkey) Beşiktaş | 6 | 1 | 0 | 5 | 6 | 15 | −9 | 3 | | 1–2 | 0–1 | 2–1 | — |

Source: UEFA

=== Group L ===
| Pos | Team | Pld | W | D | L | GF | GA | GD | Pts | Qualification | MUN | AZ | PAR | AST |
|---|---|---|---|---|---|---|---|---|---|---|---|---|---|---|
| 1 | (England) Manchester United | 6 | 4 | 1 | 1 | 10 | 2 | +8 | 13 | Advance to knockout phase | — | 4–0 | 3–0 | 1–0 |
| 2 | (Netherlands) AZ | 6 | 2 | 3 | 1 | 15 | 8 | +7 | 9 | Advance to knockout phase | 0–0 | — | 2–2 | 6–0 |
| 3 | (Serbia) Partizan | 6 | 2 | 2 | 2 | 10 | 10 | 0 | 8 | | 0–1 | 2–2 | — | 4–1 |
| 4 | (Kazakhstan) Astana | 6 | 1 | 0 | 5 | 4 | 19 | −15 | 3 | | 2–1 | 0–5 | 1–2 | — |

Source: UEFA

== Knockout phase ==
In the knockout phase, teams played against each other over two legs on a home-and-away basis, except for the one-match final. The mechanism of the draws for each round was as follows:

- In the draw for the round of 32, the twelve group winners and the four third-placed teams from the Champions League group stage with the better group records were seeded, and the twelve group runners-up and the other four third-placed teams from the Champions League group stage were unseeded. The seeded teams were drawn against the unseeded teams, with the seeded teams hosting the second leg. Teams from the same group or the same association cannot be drawn against each other.
- In the draws for the round of 16 onwards, there were no seedings, and teams from the same group or the same association could be drawn against each other. As the draws for the quarter-finals and semi-finals were held together before the quarter-finals were played, the identity of the quarter-final winners was not known at the time of the semi-final draw. A draw was also held to determine which semi-final winner was designated as the "home" team for the final (for administrative purposes as it was played at a neutral venue).

On 17 June 2020, UEFA announced that due to the COVID-19 pandemic in Europe, the final stages of the competition would feature a format change. The quarter-finals, semi-finals, and final would be played in a single-leg format from 10 to 21 August 2020 in the German cities of Cologne, Düsseldorf, Duisburg and Gelsenkirchen. The matches were tentatively played behind closed doors, though spectators could be allowed subject to a review of the situation and the decisions of the national and local government.

Following the competition restarts in August 2020, a maximum of five substitutions were allowed, with a sixth allowed in extra time. However, each team was only given three opportunities to make substitutions, with a fourth opportunity in extra time, excluding substitutions made at half-time, before the start of extra time, and at half-time in extra time. This followed a proposal from FIFA and approval by IFAB to lessen the impact of fixture congestion.

=== Bracket ===
Round of 32
(Greece) Olympiacos (a.e.t.; a) | 0 | 2 | 2
(England) Arsenal | 1 | 1 | 2
(England) Wolverhampton Wanderers | 4 | 2 | 6
(Spain) Espanyol | 0 | 3 | 3
(Romania) CFR Cluj | 1 | 0 | 1
(Spain) Sevilla (a) | 1 | 0 | 1
(Italy) Roma | 1 | 1 | 2
(Belgium) Gent | 0 | 1 | 1
(Netherlands) AZ | 1 | 0 | 1
(Austria) LASK | 1 | 2 | 3
(Belgium) Club Brugge | 1 | 0 | 1
(England) Manchester United | 1 | 5 | 6
(Portugal) Sporting CP | 3 | 1 | 4
(Turkey) İstanbul Başakşehir (a.e.t.) | 1 | 4 | 5
(Denmark) Copenhagen | 1 | 3 | 4
(Scotland) Celtic | 1 | 1 | 2
(Bulgaria) Ludogorets Razgrad | 0 | 1 | 1
(Italy) Inter Milan | 2 | 2 | 4
(Spain) Getafe | 2 | 1 | 3
(Netherlands) Ajax | 0 | 2 | 2
(Scotland) Rangers | 3 | 1 | 4
(Portugal) Braga | 2 | 0 | 2
(Germany) Bayer Leverkusen | 2 | 3 | 5
(Portugal) Porto | 1 | 1 | 2
(Germany) VfL Wolfsburg | 2 | 3 | 5
(Sweden) Malmö FF | 1 | 0 | 1
(Ukraine) Shakhtar Donetsk | 2 | 3 | 5
(Portugal) Benfica | 1 | 3 | 4
(Germany) Eintracht Frankfurt | 4 | 2 | 6
(Austria) Red Bull Salzburg | 1 | 2 | 3
(Cyprus) APOEL | 0 | 0 | 0
(Switzerland) Basel | 3 | 1 | 4

Round of 16
(Greece) Olympiacos | 1 | 0 | 1
(England) Wolverhampton Wanderers | 1 | 1 | 2
(Spain) Sevilla | 2
(Italy) Roma | 0
(Austria) LASK | 0 | 1 | 1
(England) Manchester United | 5 | 2 | 7
(Turkey) İstanbul Başakşehir | 1 | 0 | 1
(Denmark) Copenhagen | 0 | 3 | 3
(Italy) Inter Milan | 2
(Spain) Getafe | 0
(Scotland) Rangers | 1 | 0 | 1
(Germany) Bayer Leverkusen | 3 | 1 | 4
(Germany) VfL Wolfsburg | 1 | 0 | 1
(Ukraine) Shakhtar Donetsk | 2 | 3 | 5
(Germany) Eintracht Frankfurt | 0 | 0 | 0
(Switzerland) Basel | 3 | 1 | 4

Quarter-finals
11 August – Duisburg
(England) Wolverhampton Wanderers | 0
(Spain) Sevilla | 1
10 August – Cologne
(England) Manchester United (a.e.t.) | 1
(Denmark) Copenhagen | 0
10 August – Düsseldorf
(Italy) Inter Milan | 2
(Germany) Bayer Leverkusen | 1
11 August – Gelsenkirchen
(Ukraine) Shakhtar Donetsk | 4
(Switzerland) Basel | 1

Semi-finals
16 August – Cologne
(Spain) Sevilla | 2
(England) Manchester United | 1
17 August – Düsseldorf
(Italy) Inter Milan | 5
(Ukraine) Shakhtar Donetsk | 0

Final
21 August – Cologne
(Spain) Sevilla | 3
(Italy) Inter Milan | 2

=== Round of 32 ===
The draw for the round of 32 was held on 16 December 2019, 13:00 CET. The first legs were played on 20 February, and the second legs were played on 26, 27, and 28 February 2020.

| Team 1 | Agg. | Team 2 | 1st leg | 2nd leg |
|---|---|---|---|---|
| Wolverhampton Wanderers (England) | 6–3 | (Spain) Espanyol | 4–0 | 2–3 |
| Sporting CP (Portugal) | 4–5 | (Turkey) İstanbul Başakşehir | 3–1 | 1–4 (a.e.t.) |
| Getafe (Spain) | 3–2 | (Netherlands) Ajax | 2–0 | 1–2 |
| Bayer Leverkusen (Germany) | 5–2 | (Portugal) Porto | 2–1 | 3–1 |
| Copenhagen (Denmark) | 4–2 | (Scotland) Celtic | 1–1 | 3–1 |
| APOEL (Cyprus) | 0–4 | (Switzerland) Basel | 0–3 | 0–1 |
| CFR Cluj (Romania) | 1–1 (a) | (Spain) Sevilla | 1–1 | 0–0 |
| Olympiacos (Greece) | 2–2 (a) | (England) Arsenal | 0–1 | 2–1 (a.e.t.) |
| AZ (Netherlands) | 1–3 | (Austria) LASK | 1–1 | 0–2 |
| Club Brugge (Belgium) | 1–6 | (England) Manchester United | 1–1 | 0–5 |
| Ludogorets Razgrad (Bulgaria) | 1–4 | (Italy) Inter Milan | 0–2 | 1–2 |
| Eintracht Frankfurt (Germany) | 6–3 | (Austria) Red Bull Salzburg | 4–1 | 2–2 |
| Shakhtar Donetsk (Ukraine) | 5–4 | (Portugal) Benfica | 2–1 | 3–3 |
| VfL Wolfsburg (Germany) | 5–1 | (Sweden) Malmö FF | 2–1 | 3–0 |
| Roma (Italy) | 2–1 | (Belgium) Gent | 1–0 | 1–1 |
| Rangers (Scotland) | 4–2 | (Portugal) Braga | 3–2 | 1–0 |

=== Round of 16 ===
The draw for the round of 16 was held on 28 February 2020, 13:00 CET. Six of the eight first leg matches were played on 12 March, while the remaining first legs and all second leg fixtures were postponed by UEFA due to concerns over the COVID-19 pandemic in Europe. On 17 June 2020, UEFA announced that the second legs would be played on 5–6 August 2020. In July 2020, they confirmed that the second legs would be played at the home team's stadium as normal. For the two ties that had not played their first legs, the matches were instead played in a single-leg format, at neutral venues in Germany.

| Team 1 | Agg. | Team 2 | 1st leg | 2nd leg |
|---|---|---|---|---|
| İstanbul Başakşehir (Turkey) | 1–3 | (Denmark) Copenhagen | 1–0 | 0–3 |
| Olympiacos (Greece) | 1–2 | (England) Wolverhampton Wanderers | 1–1 | 0–1 |
| Rangers (Scotland) | 1–4 | (Germany) Bayer Leverkusen | 1–3 | 0–1 |
| VfL Wolfsburg (Germany) | 1–5 | (Ukraine) Shakhtar Donetsk | 1–2 | 0–3 |
| Inter Milan (Italy) | 2–0 | (Spain) Getafe | | |
| Sevilla (Spain) | 2–0 | (Italy) Roma | | |
| Eintracht Frankfurt (Germany) | 0–4 | (Switzerland) Basel | 0–3 | 0–1 |
| LASK (Austria) | 1–7 | (England) Manchester United | 0–5 | 1–2 |

=== Quarter-finals ===
The draw for the quarter-finals took place on 10 July 2020. The matches were played on 10 and 11 August 2020.

| Team 1 | Score | Team 2 |
|---|---|---|
| Shakhtar Donetsk (Ukraine) | 4–1 | (Switzerland) Basel |
| Manchester United (England) | 1–0 (a.e.t.) | (Denmark) Copenhagen |
| Inter Milan (Italy) | 2–1 | (Germany) Bayer Leverkusen |
| Wolverhampton Wanderers (England) | 0–1 | (Spain) Sevilla |

=== Semi-finals ===
The draw for the semi-finals took place on 10 July 2020 (after the quarter-final draw). The matches were played on 16 and 17 August 2020.

| Team 1 | Score | Team 2 |
|---|---|---|
| Sevilla (Spain) | 2–1 | (England) Manchester United |
| Inter Milan (Italy) | 5–0 | (Ukraine) Shakhtar Donetsk |

=== Final ===
The final was played at the RheinEnergieStadion in Cologne. The "home" team (for administrative purposes) was determined by an additional draw held after the quarter-final and semi-final draws.

21 August 2020
21:00 UTC+2

| Sevilla (Spain) | 3–2 | (Italy) Inter Milan |
|---|---|---|
| De Jong 12', 33'; Lukaku 74' (o.g.) | Report | Lukaku 5' (pen.); Godín 36' |

RheinEnergieStadion, Cologne
Attendance: 0 (Note: The remainder of the competition, held in August 2020, was played behind closed doors due to the COVID-19 pandemic in Europe.)
Referee: Danny Makkelie (Netherlands)

== Statistics ==
Statistics exclude qualifying rounds and play-off round.

=== Top goalscorers ===
| Rank | Player | Team(s) | Goals | Minutes played |
|---|---|---|---|---|
| 1 | (Portugal) Bruno Fernandes (Note: Bruno Fernandes played for Sporting CP in the group stage and for Manchester United in the knockout stage, after his transfer during the January transfer window.) | (Portugal) Sporting CP (England) Manchester United | 8 | 811 |
| 2 | (Belgium) Romelu Lukaku | (Italy) Inter Milan | 7 | 443 |
| 3 | (Portugal) Diogo Jota | (England) Wolverhampton Wanderers | 6 | 373 |
| 3 | (Slovenia) Andraž Šporar (Note: Andraž Šporar played for Slovan Bratislava in the group stage and for Sporting CP in the knockout stage, after his transfer during the January transfer window.) | (Slovakia) Slovan Bratislava (Portugal) Sporting CP | 6 | 718 |
| 3 | (Japan) Daichi Kamada | (Germany) Eintracht Frankfurt | 6 | 738 |
| 3 | (Colombia) Alfredo Morelos | (Scotland) Rangers | 6 | 792 |
| 3 | (Bosnia and Herzegovina) Edin Višća | (Turkey) İstanbul Başakşehir | 6 | 930 |
| 8 | (Spain) Munir | (Spain) Sevilla | 5 | 445 |
| 8 | (Austria) Marko Raguž | (Austria) LASK | 5 | 486 |
| 8 | (England) Mason Greenwood | (England) Manchester United | 5 | 640 |
| 8 | (Switzerland) Fabian Frei | (Switzerland) Basel | 5 | 964 |

=== Top assists ===
| Rank | Player | Team(s) | Assists | Minutes played |
|---|---|---|---|---|
| 1 | (Brazil) Galeno | (Portugal) Braga | 6 | 567 |
| 2 | (Spain) Juan Mata | (England) Manchester United | 5 | 767 |
| 3 | (Serbia) Uroš Matić | (Cyprus) APOEL | 4 | 720 |
| 3 | (Portugal) Bruno Fernandes | (Portugal) Sporting CP (England) Manchester United | 4 | 811 |
| 5 | 23 players | | 3 | —N/a |

=== Squad of the season ===
The UEFA technical study group selected the following 23 players as the squad of the tournament.

| Pos. | Player | Team(s) |
|---|---|---|
| GK | (Slovenia) Samir Handanović | (Italy) Inter Milan |
| GK | (Morocco) Yassine Bounou | (Spain) Sevilla |
| GK | (Sweden) Karl-Johan Johnsson | (Denmark) Copenhagen |
| DF | (Spain) Sergio Reguilón | (Spain) Sevilla |
| DF | (Spain) Jesús Navas | (Spain) Sevilla |
| DF | (Netherlands) Stefan de Vrij | (Italy) Inter Milan |
| DF | (England) Conor Coady | (England) Wolverhampton Wanderers |
| DF | (France) Jules Koundé | (Spain) Sevilla |
| DF | (Germany) Jonathan Tah | (Germany) Bayer Leverkusen |
| MF | (Portugal) Bruno Fernandes | (Portugal) Sporting CP (England) Manchester United |
| MF | (Argentina) Éver Banega | (Spain) Sevilla |
| MF | (Germany) Kai Havertz | (Germany) Bayer Leverkusen |
| MF | (Brazil) Fred | (England) Manchester United |
| MF | (Brazil) Taison | (Ukraine) Shakhtar Donetsk |
| MF | (Italy) Nicolò Barella | (Italy) Inter Milan |
| MF | (Croatia) Marcelo Brozović | (Italy) Inter Milan |
| MF | (Switzerland) Fabian Frei | (Switzerland) Basel |
| FW | (Belgium) Romelu Lukaku | (Italy) Inter Milan |
| FW | (Argentina) Lautaro Martínez | (Italy) Inter Milan |
| FW | (England) Marcus Rashford | (England) Manchester United |
| FW | (Argentina) Lucas Ocampos | (Spain) Sevilla |
| FW | (Spain) Munir | (Spain) Sevilla |
| FW | (Netherlands) Luuk de Jong | (Spain) Sevilla |

=== Player of the season ===
Votes were cast by coaches of the 48 teams in the group stage, together with 55 journalists selected by the European Sports Media (ESM) group, representing each of UEFA's member associations. The coaches were not allowed to vote for players from their own teams. Jury members selected their top three players, with the first receiving five points, the second three and the third one. The shortlist of the top three players was announced on 17 September 2020. The award winner was announced during the 2020–21 UEFA Europa League group stage draw in Switzerland on 2 October 2020.

| Rank | Player | Team(s) | Points |
Shortlist of top three
| 1 | (Belgium) Romelu Lukaku | (Italy) Inter Milan | 270 |
| 2 | (Portugal) Bruno Fernandes | (Portugal) Sporting CP (England) Manchester United | 128 |
| 3 | (Argentina) Éver Banega | (Spain) Sevilla | 118 |
Players ranked 4–10
| 4 | (Netherlands) Luuk de Jong | (Spain) Sevilla | 64 |
| 5 | (Spain) Jesús Navas | (Spain) Sevilla | 59 |
| 6 | (Argentina) Lucas Ocampos | (Spain) Sevilla | 39 |
| 7 | (Germany) Kai Havertz | (Germany) Bayer Leverkusen | 17 |
| 8 | (Brazil) Diego Carlos | (Spain) Sevilla | 9 |
| 9 | (Spain) Adama Traoré | (England) Wolverhampton Wanderers | 8 |
| 10 | (France) Jules Koundé | (Spain) Sevilla | 7 |

== See also ==
- 2019–20 UEFA Champions League
- 2020 UEFA Super Cup
