= 2019–20 UEFA Europa League qualifying (third and play-off round matches) =

European football competition

This page summarises the matches of the third qualifying and play-off rounds of 2019–20 UEFA Europa League qualifying.

Times are CEST (UTC+2), as listed by UEFA (local times, if different, are in parentheses).

== Third qualifying round ==
=== Summary ===
The first legs were played on 6, 7 and 8 August, and the second legs on 13, 14 and 15 August 2019.

Team 1	Agg.	Team 2	1st leg	2nd leg
Champions Path
Sutjeska (Montenegro)	3–5	(Northern Ireland) Linfield	1–2	2–3
Maccabi Tel Aviv (Israel)	2–4	(Lithuania) Sūduva	1–2	1–2
Ararat-Armenia	3–2	(Georgia (country)) Saburtalo Tbilisi	1–2	2–0
Riga (Latvia)	3–3 (a)	(Finland) HJK	1–1	2–2
Ludogorets Razgrad (Bulgaria)	9–0	(Wales) The New Saints	5–0	4–0
Sarajevo (Bosnia and Herzegovina)	1–2	(Belarus) BATE Borisov	1–2	0–0
F91 Dudelange (Luxembourg)	4–1	(Estonia) Nõmme Kalju	3–1	1–0
Astana (Kazakhstan)	9–1	(Malta) Valletta	5–1	4–0
Sheriff Tiraspol (Moldova)	2–3	(Sweden) AIK	1–2	1–1
Slovan Bratislava (Slovakia)	4–1	(Republic of Ireland) Dundalk	1–0	3–1
Main Path
IFK Norrköping (Sweden)	2–4	(Israel) Hapoel Be'er Sheva	1–1	1–3
Torino (Italy)	6–1	(Belarus) Shakhtyor Soligorsk	5–0	1–1
Antwerp (Belgium)	2–2 (a)	(Czech Republic) Viktoria Plzeň	1–0	1–2 (a.e.t.)
Austria Wien	2–5	(Cyprus) Apollon Limassol	1–2	1–3
Feyenoord (Netherlands)	5–1	(Georgia (country)) Dinamo Tbilisi	4–0	1–1
Brøndby (Denmark)	3–7	(Portugal) Braga	2–4	1–3
Molde (Norway)	4–3	(Greece) Aris	3–0	1–3 (a.e.t.)
Lokomotiv Plovdiv (Bulgaria)	0–2	(France) Strasbourg	0–1	0–1
Thun (Switzerland)	3–5	(Russia) Spartak Moscow	2–3	1–2
FCSB (Romania)	1–0	(Czech Republic) Mladá Boleslav	0–0	1–0
Pyunik (Armenia)	0–8	(England) Wolverhampton Wanderers	0–4	0–4
Midtjylland (Denmark)	3–7	(Scotland) Rangers	2–4	1–3
Mariupol (Ukraine)	0–4	(Netherlands) AZ	0–0	0–4
AEK Larnaca (Cyprus)	1–4	(Belgium) Gent	1–1	0–3
Legia Warsaw (Poland)	2–0	(Greece) Atromitos	0–0	2–0
Haugesund (Norway)	0–1	(Netherlands) PSV Eindhoven	0–1	0–0
Rijeka (Croatia)	4–0	(Scotland) Aberdeen	2–0	2–0
Ventspils (Latvia)	0–9	(Portugal) Vitória de Guimarães	0–3	0–6
Vaduz (Liechtenstein)	0–6	(Germany) Eintracht Frankfurt	0–5	0–1
Partizan (Serbia)	3–2	(Turkey) Yeni Malatyaspor	3–1	0–1
Malmö FF (Sweden)	3–1	(Bosnia and Herzegovina) Zrinjski Mostar	3–0	0–1
CSKA Sofia (Bulgaria)	1–2	(Ukraine) Zorya Luhansk	1–1	0–1
Neftçi (Azerbaijan)	3–4	(Israel) Bnei Yehuda	2–2	1–2
Luzern (Switzerland)	0–6	(Spain) Espanyol	0–3	0–3
Sparta Prague (Czech Republic)	3–4	(Turkey) Trabzonspor	2–2	1–2
Universitatea Craiova (Romania)	1–3	(Greece) AEK Athens	0–2	1–1

=== Champions Path matches ===
6 August 2019
20:15

Sutjeska (Montenegro)	1–2	(Northern Ireland) Linfield
Kojašević 11'	Report	Millar 38', 65'

Podgorica City Stadium, Podgorica (Note: Sutjeska Nikšić played their home match at Podgorica City Stadium, Podgorica, instead of their regular stadium Stadion kraj Bistrice, Nikšić which did not meet UEFA requirements.)
Attendance: 3,850
Referee: Alan Mario Sant (Malta)
13 August 2019
20:45 (19:45 UTC+1)

Linfield (Northern Ireland)	3–2	(Montenegro) Sutjeska
Stafford 7'; Lavery 18'; Clarke 76'	Report	Božović 15', 61'

Windsor Park, Belfast
Attendance: 3,639
Referee: Miroslav Zelinka (Czech Republic)

Linfield won 5–3 on aggregate.

8 August 2019
19:30 (20:30 UTC+3)

Maccabi Tel Aviv (Israel)	1–2	(Lithuania) Sūduva
Ofoedu 84'	Report	Kerla 37'; E. Jankauskas 76'

Netanya Stadium, Netanya (Note: Maccabi Tel Aviv played their home match at Netanya Stadium, Netanya, instead of their regular stadium Bloomfield Stadium, Tel Aviv which is undergoing renovation.)
Attendance: 8,512
Referee: Neil Doyle (Republic of Ireland)
15 August 2019
19:00 (20:00 UTC+3)

Sūduva (Lithuania)	2–1	(Israel) Maccabi Tel Aviv
Topčagić 12'; Švrljuga 45'	Report	Blackman 86'

Sūduva Stadium, Marijampolė
Attendance: 5,337
Referee: Tore Hansen (Norway)

Sūduva won 4–2 on aggregate.

6 August 2019
17:00 (19:00 UTC+4)

Ararat-Armenia	1–2	(Georgia (country)) Saburtalo Tbilisi
Kobyalko 31'	Report	Altunashvili 72'; Kenia 76'

Vazgen Sargsyan Republican Stadium, Yerevan (Note: Ararat-Armenia played their third qualifying and play-off rounds home matches at Vazgen Sargsyan Republican Stadium, Yerevan, instead of their regular stadium Yerevan Football Academy Stadium, Yerevan which did not meet UEFA requirements.)
Attendance: 10,500
Referee: Alain Bieri (Switzerland)
14 August 2019
18:00 (20:00 UTC+4)

Saburtalo Tbilisi (Georgia (country))	0–2	Ararat-Armenia
	Report	Kobyalko 10'; Avetisyan 67' (pen.)

Mikheil Meskhi Stadium, Tbilisi
Attendance: 14,904
Referee: Mykola Balakin (Ukraine)

Ararat-Armenia won 3–2 on aggregate.

6 August 2019
18:00 (19:00 UTC+3)

Riga (Latvia)	1–1	(Finland) HJK
Biliński 81'	Report	Väyrynen 7'

Daugava Stadium, Riga (Note: Riga played their third qualifying round home match at Daugava Stadium, Riga, instead of their regular stadium Skonto Stadium, Riga.)
Attendance: 3,468
Referee: Kirill Levnikov (Russia)
15 August 2019
18:00 (19:00 UTC+3)

HJK (Finland)	2–2	(Latvia) Riga
Forsell 5'; Väyrynen 69'	Report	Debelko 62', 80'

Telia 5G -areena, Helsinki
Attendance: 6,847
Referee: Mohammed Al-Hakim (Sweden)

3–3 on aggregate; Riga won on away goals.

8 August 2019
19:30 (20:30 UTC+3)

Ludogorets Razgrad (Bulgaria)	5–0	(Wales) The New Saints
Harrington 10' (o.g.); Tchibota 28'; Lukoki 43'; Keșerü 65'; Moți 76'	Report

Ludogorets Arena, Razgrad
Attendance: 4,120
Referee: Marius Avram (Romania)
15 August 2019
19:30 (18:30 UTC+1)

The New Saints (Wales)	0–4	(Bulgaria) Ludogorets Razgrad
	Report	Świerczok 36', 77'; Lukoki 42'; Biton 90+2'

Racecourse Ground, Wrexham (Note: The New Saints played their home match at Racecourse Ground, Wrexham, instead of their regular stadium Park Hall, Oswestry due to UEFA regulations.)
Attendance: 712
Referee: Kristo Tohver (Estonia)

Ludogorets Razgrad won 9–0 on aggregate.

8 August 2019
19:45

Sarajevo (Bosnia and Herzegovina)	1–2	(Belarus) BATE Borisov
Handžić 79'	Report	Baha 19'; Moukam 71' (pen.)

Bilino Polje Stadium, Zenica (Note: Sarajevo played their home match at Bilino Polje Stadium, Zenica, instead of their regular stadium Koševo City Stadium, Sarajevo.)
Attendance: 7,124
Referee: Alexandre Boucaut (Belgium)
15 August 2019
19:00 (20:00 UTC+3)

BATE Borisov (Belarus)	0–0	(Bosnia and Herzegovina) Sarajevo
	Report

Borisov Arena, Barysaw
Attendance: 11,876
Referee: Kevin Blom (Netherlands)

BATE Borisov won 2–1 on aggregate.

8 August 2019
20:00

F91 Dudelange (Luxembourg)	3–1	(Estonia) Nõmme Kalju
Stolz 28', 30', 75'	Report	Puri 41'

Stade Josy Barthel, Luxembourg City (Note: F91 Dudelange play their home matches at Stade Josy Barthel, Luxembourg City, instead of their regular stadium Stade Jos Nosbaum, Dudelange.)
Attendance: 1,239
Referee: Fábio Veríssimo (Portugal)
13 August 2019
18:00 (19:00 UTC+3)

Nõmme Kalju (Estonia)	0–1	(Luxembourg) F91 Dudelange
	Report	Sinani 56'

A. Le Coq Arena, Tallinn (Note: Nõmme Kalju played their home match at A. Le Coq Arena, Tallinn, instead of their regular stadium Hiiu Stadium, Tallinn which did not meet UEFA requirements.)
Attendance: 1,202
Referee: Sergey Lapochkin (Russia)

F91 Dudelange won 4–1 on aggregate.

8 August 2019
16:00 (20:00 UTC+6)

Astana (Kazakhstan)	5–1	(Malta) Valletta
Sigurjónsson 8', 57'; Logvinenko 15'; Tomasov 35'; Janga 80'	Report	Fontanella 67'

Astana Arena, Nur-Sultan
Attendance: 18,707
Referee: Vladislav Bezborodov (Russia)
15 August 2019
20:00

Valletta (Malta)	0–4	(Kazakhstan) Astana
	Report	Murtazayev 25', 68'; Tomasov 37', 89'

National Stadium, Ta' Qali
Attendance: 595
Referee: Stephan Klossner (Switzerland)

Astana won 9–1 on aggregate.

8 August 2019
19:00 (20:00 UTC+3)

Sheriff Tiraspol (Moldova)	1–2	(Sweden) AIK
Kendysh 56' (pen.)	Report	Lukić 12' (o.g.); Sigþórsson 14'

Sheriff Stadium, Tiraspol
Attendance: 6,341
Referee: Kevin Clancy (Scotland)
15 August 2019
19:00

AIK (Sweden)	1–1	(Moldova) Sheriff Tiraspol
Bahoui 61'	Report	Boban 86'

Friends Arena, Solna
Attendance: 13,122
Referee: Roi Reinshreiber (Israel)

AIK won 3–2 on aggregate.

7 August 2019
20:15

Slovan Bratislava (Slovakia)	1–0	(Republic of Ireland) Dundalk
Holman 86'	Report

Tehelné pole, Bratislava
Attendance: 9,980
Referee: Frank Schneider (France)
13 August 2019
21:00 (20:00 UTC+1)

Dundalk (Republic of Ireland)	1–3	(Slovakia) Slovan Bratislava
Duffy 70'	Report	Ratão 12'; Čavrić 33'; Daniel 90+3'

Tallaght Stadium, Tallaght (Note: Dundalk played their home match at Tallaght Stadium, Tallaght, instead of their regular stadium Oriel Park, Dundalk which did not meet UEFA requirements.)
Attendance: 4,199
Referee: Robert Schörgenhofer (Austria)

Slovan Bratislava won 4–1 on aggregate.

=== Main Path matches ===
8 August 2019
20:00

IFK Norrköping (Sweden)	1–1	(Israel) Hapoel Be'er Sheva
Sema 51'	Report	Shamir 55'

Nya Parken, Norrköping
Attendance: 6,479
Referee: Pol van Boekel (Netherlands)
15 August 2019
19:30 (20:30 UTC+3)

Hapoel Be'er Sheva (Israel)	3–1	(Sweden) IFK Norrköping
Zrihan 67', 90+4'; Hasselbaink 72'	Report	Lauritsen 82'

Turner Stadium, Be'er Sheva
Attendance: 10,088
Referee: Anastasios Papapetrou (Greece)

Hapoel Be'er Sheva won 4–2 on aggregate.

8 August 2019
21:00

Torino (Italy)	5–0	(Belarus) Shakhtyor Soligorsk
Belotti 2', 63' (pen.); Izzo 15'; De Silvestri 72'; Bonifazi 76'	Report

Stadio Olimpico, Turin
Attendance: 15,977
Referee: Daniel Stefański (Poland)
15 August 2019
19:00 (20:00 UTC+3)

Shakhtyor Soligorsk (Belarus)	1–1	(Italy) Torino
Yanush 90+1' (pen.)	Report	Zaza 80'

Dinamo Stadium, Minsk
Attendance: 6,154
Referee: Radu Petrescu (Romania)

Torino won 6–1 on aggregate.

8 August 2019
19:30

Antwerp (Belgium)	1–0	(Czech Republic) Viktoria Plzeň
Rodrigues 29'	Report

King Baudouin Stadium, Brussels (Note: Antwerp played their home matches at King Baudouin Stadium, Brussels, instead of their regular stadium Bosuilstadion, Antwerp which did not meet UEFA requirements.)
Attendance: 15,734
Referee: Jens Maae (Denmark)
15 August 2019
20:00

Viktoria Plzeň (Czech Republic)	2–1 (a.e.t.)	(Belgium) Antwerp
Krmenčík 81', 97'	Report	Mbokani 113'

Doosan Arena, Plzeň
Attendance: 9,717
Referee: Davide Massa (Italy)

2–2 on aggregate; Antwerp won on away goals.

8 August 2019
20:30

Austria Wien	1–2	(Cyprus) Apollon Limassol
Klein 41' (pen.)	Report	Marković 14' (pen.); Gakpé 50'

Generali Arena, Vienna
Attendance: 8,165
Referee: Massimiliano Irrati (Italy)
15 August 2019
19:00 (20:00 UTC+3)

Apollon Limassol (Cyprus)	3–1	Austria Wien
Gakpé 45+2' (pen.); Handl 55' (o.g.); Gianniotas 67'	Report	Jarjué 18'

GSP Stadium, Nicosia (Note: Apollon Limassol played their home matches at GSP Stadium, Nicosia, instead of their regular stadium Tsirio Stadium, Limassol.)
Attendance: 2,750
Referee: Paweł Gil (Poland)

Apollon Limassol won 5–2 on aggregate.

8 August 2019
19:30

Feyenoord (Netherlands)	4–0	(Georgia (country)) Dinamo Tbilisi
Sinisterra 43'; Kobouri 82' (o.g.); Berghuis 85' (pen.); Narsingh 88'	Report

De Kuip, Rotterdam
Attendance: 36,500
Referee: Serhiy Boyko (Ukraine)
15 August 2019
18:30 (20:30 UTC+4)

Dinamo Tbilisi (Georgia (country))	1–1	(Netherlands) Feyenoord
Shengelia 52'	Report	Botteghin 57'

Boris Paichadze Dinamo Arena, Tbilisi
Attendance: 0 (Note: The match was played behind closed doors.)
Referee: Sascha Stegemann (Germany)

Feyenoord won 5–1 on aggregate.

8 August 2019
18:30

Brøndby (Denmark)	2–4	(Portugal) Braga
Kaiser 15', 50'	Report	Paulinho 18'; A. Horta 20'; R. Horta 90+2'; Hermannsson 90+4' (o.g.)

Brøndby Stadium, Brøndbyvester
Attendance: 15,642
Referee: Tamás Bognár (Hungary)
15 August 2019
20:45 (19:45 UTC+1)

Braga (Portugal)	3–1	(Denmark) Brøndby
Palhinha 19'; A. Horta 41'; Paulinho 66'	Report	Bjur 85'

Estadio Municipal, Braga
Attendance: 11,964
Referee: Aleksei Eskov (Russia)

Braga won 7–3 on aggregate.

8 August 2019
19:00

Molde (Norway)	3–0	(Greece) Aris
Eikrem 27'; Hestad 32'; Ellingsen 87'	Report

Aker Stadion, Molde
Attendance: 3,953
Referee: Maurizio Mariani (Italy)
15 August 2019
20:30 (21:30 UTC+3)

Aris (Greece)	3–1 (a.e.t.)	(Norway) Molde
Matilla 25'; Delizisis 37'; Diguiny 84'	Report	Bolly 105+1'

Kleanthis Vikelidis Stadium, Thessaloniki
Attendance: 12,821
Referee: Rob Harvey (Republic of Ireland)

Molde won 4–3 on aggregate.

8 August 2019
19:30 (20:30 UTC+3)

Lokomotiv Plovdiv (Bulgaria)	0–1	(France) Strasbourg
	Report	Mitrović 11'

Stadion Lokomotiv, Plovdiv
Attendance: 7,600
Referee: João Pinheiro (Portugal)
15 August 2019
20:30

Strasbourg (France)	1–0	(Bulgaria) Lokomotiv Plovdiv
Zohi 8'	Report

Stade de la Meinau, Strasbourg
Attendance: 19,109
Referee: John Beaton (Scotland)

Strasbourg won 2–0 on aggregate.

8 August 2019
19:00

Thun (Switzerland)	2–3	(Russia) Spartak Moscow
Hefti 52'; Rapp 59'	Report	Ponce 22'; Bakayev 29', 73'

Stockhorn Arena, Thun
Attendance: 6,150
Referee: Irfan Peljto (Bosnia and Herzegovina)
15 August 2019
18:45 (19:45 UTC+3)

Spartak Moscow (Russia)	2–1	(Switzerland) Thun
Ponce 52'; Schürrle 58'	Report	Glarner 7'

Otkritie Arena, Moscow
Attendance: 33,076
Referee: Srđan Jovanović (Serbia)

Spartak Moscow won 5–3 on aggregate.

8 August 2019
20:30 (21:30 UTC+3)

FCSB (Romania)	0–0	(Czech Republic) Mladá Boleslav
	Report

Stadionul Marin Anastasovici, Giurgiu (Note: FCSB played their home matches at Stadionul Marin Anastasovici, Giurgiu, instead of their regular stadium Arena Națională, Bucharest.)
Attendance: 2,315
Referee: Adrien Jaccottet (Switzerland)
15 August 2019
19:00

Mladá Boleslav (Czech Republic)	0–1	(Romania) FCSB
	Report	Panțîru 90+1'

Lokotrans Aréna, Mladá Boleslav
Attendance: 4,695
Referee: Jonathan Lardot (Belgium)

FCSB won 1–0 on aggregate.

8 August 2019
18:00 (20:00 UTC+4)

Pyunik (Armenia)	0–4	(England) Wolverhampton Wanderers
	Report	Doherty 29'; Jiménez 42', 46'; Neves 90+1' (pen.)

Vazgen Sargsyan Republican Stadium, Yerevan
Attendance: 13,050
Referee: Michael Fabbri (Italy)
15 August 2019
20:45 (19:45 UTC+1)

Wolverhampton Wanderers (England)	4–0	(Armenia) Pyunik
Neto 54'; Gibbs-White 58'; Vinagre 64'; Jota 87'	Report

Molineux Stadium, Wolverhampton
Attendance: 29,391
Referee: Donatas Rumšas (Lithuania)

Wolverhampton Wanderers won 8–0 on aggregate.

8 August 2019
20:00

Midtjylland (Denmark)	2–4	(Scotland) Rangers
Onyeka 58'; Kaba 63'	Report	Morelos 43'; Aribo 52'; Katić 56'; Arfield 70'

MCH Arena, Herning
Attendance: 9,322
Referee: Kristo Tohver (Estonia)
15 August 2019
20:45 (19:45 UTC+1)

Rangers (Scotland)	3–1	(Denmark) Midtjylland
Morelos 14', 49'; Ojo 39'	Report	Evander 72'

Ibrox Stadium, Glasgow
Attendance: 47,184
Referee: Marco Di Bello (Italy)

Rangers won 7–3 on aggregate.

8 August 2019
19:00 (20:00 UTC+3)

Mariupol (Ukraine)	0–0	(Netherlands) AZ
	Report

Chornomorets Stadium, Odesa (Note: Mariupol played their home match at Chornomorets Stadium, Odesa, instead of their regular stadium Volodymyr Boiko Stadium, Mariupol due to the war conditions in Eastern Ukraine.)
Attendance: 4,426
Referee: Michael Tykgaard (Denmark)
15 August 2019
20:30

AZ (Netherlands)	4–0	(Ukraine) Mariupol
Stengs 20'; Ouwejan 44'; Wuytens 62'; Yavorskyi 90' (o.g.)	Report

Cars Jeans Stadion, The Hague (Note: AZ played their third qualifying round home match at Cars Jeans Stadion, The Hague and play-off round home match at De Grolsch Veste, Enschede, instead of their regular stadium, AFAS Stadion, Alkmaar, due to its roof collapse.)
Attendance: 8,018
Referee: Bartosz Frankowski (Poland)

AZ won 4–0 on aggregate.

8 August 2019
17:30 (18:30 UTC+3)

AEK Larnaca (Cyprus)	1–1	(Belgium) Gent
Trichkovski 88'	Report	Yaremchuk 26'

AEK Arena – Georgios Karapatakis, Larnaca
Attendance: 3,360
Referee: Svein Oddvar Moen (Norway)
15 August 2019
20:30

Gent (Belgium)	3–0	(Cyprus) AEK Larnaca
Depoitre 64'; Jonathan David 90+3', 90+6'	Report

Ghelamco Arena, Ghent
Attendance: 15,533
Referee: Martin Strömbergsson (Sweden)

Gent won 4–1 on aggregate.

8 August 2019
21:00

Legia Warsaw (Poland)	0–0	(Greece) Atromitos
	Report

Polish Army Stadium, Warsaw
Attendance: 15,093
Referee: Manuel Schüttengruber (Austria)
14 August 2019
18:00 (19:00 UTC+3)

Atromitos (Greece)	0–2	(Poland) Legia Warsaw
	Report	Stolarski 29'; Gvilia 51'

Peristeri Stadium, Peristeri
Attendance: 2,019
Referee: Bas Nijhuis (Netherlands)

Legia Warsaw won 2–0 on aggregate.

8 August 2019
19:00

Haugesund (Norway)	0–1	(Netherlands) PSV Eindhoven
	Report	Bergwijn 24' (pen.)

Haugesund Stadion, Haugesund
Attendance: 5,150
Referee: Matej Jug (Slovenia)
15 August 2019
20:30

PSV Eindhoven (Netherlands)	0–0	(Norway) Haugesund
	Report

Philips Stadion, Eindhoven
Attendance: 22,759
Referee: Juan Martínez Munuera (Spain)

PSV Eindhoven won 1–0 on aggregate.

8 August 2019
20:00

Rijeka (Croatia)	2–0	(Scotland) Aberdeen
Čolak 62' (pen.); Murić 88'	Report

Stadion Rujevica, Rijeka
Attendance: 6,452
Referee: Ricardo de Burgos Bengoetxea (Spain)
15 August 2019
20:45 (19:45 UTC+1)

Aberdeen (Scotland)	0–2	(Croatia) Rijeka
	Report	Lončar 10'; Čolak 32'

Pittodrie Stadium, Aberdeen
Attendance: 15,246
Referee: Harald Lechner (Austria)

Rijeka won 4–0 on aggregate.

8 August 2019
18:45 (19:45 UTC+3)

Ventspils (Latvia)	0–3	(Portugal) Vitória de Guimarães
	Report	Davidson 30'; Pêpê 50'; Amoah 80'

Daugava Stadium, Riga (Note: Ventspils played their third qualifying round home match at Daugava Stadium, Riga, instead of their regular stadium Ventspils Olimpiskais Stadions, Ventspils.)
Attendance: 472
Referee: Filip Glova (Slovakia)
14 August 2019
18:00 (17:00 UTC+1)

Vitória de Guimarães (Portugal)	6–0	(Latvia) Ventspils
Davidson 28'; Rochinha 48', 58'; Teixeira 79'; João Pedro 80'; Pêpê 86'	Report

Estádio D. Afonso Henriques, Guimarães
Attendance: 12,741
Referee: Halil Umut Meler (Turkey)

Vitória de Guimarães won 9–0 on aggregate.

8 August 2019
20:30

Vaduz (Liechtenstein)	0–5	(Germany) Eintracht Frankfurt
	Report	Kostić 11', 27'; Kohr 40'; Paciência 53'; Gaćinović 63'

Rheinpark Stadion, Vaduz
Attendance: 5,908
Referee: Paul Tierney (England)
15 August 2019
20:30

Eintracht Frankfurt (Germany)	1–0	(Liechtenstein) Vaduz
De Guzmán 31'	Report

Waldstadion, Frankfurt
Attendance: 48,000
Referee: Nikola Dabanović (Montenegro)

Eintracht Frankfurt won 6–0 on aggregate.

8 August 2019
21:00

Partizan (Serbia)	3–1	(Turkey) Yeni Malatyaspor
Sadiq 4'; Asano 67'; Soumah 90' (pen.)	Report	Chebake 83'

Partizan Stadium, Belgrade
Attendance: 13,442
Referee: Sergey Ivanov (Russia)
15 August 2019
19:00 (20:00 UTC+3)

Yeni Malatyaspor (Turkey)	1–0	(Serbia) Partizan
Jahović 7'	Report

Malatya Arena, Malatya
Attendance: 14,665
Referee: Chris Kavanagh (England)

Partizan won 3–2 on aggregate.

8 August 2019
19:00

Malmö FF (Sweden)	3–0	(Bosnia and Herzegovina) Zrinjski Mostar
Bengtsson 36'; Christiansen 66'; Rieks 74'	Report

Eleda Stadion, Malmö
Attendance: 14,103
Referee: Stuart Attwell (England)
15 August 2019
19:00

Zrinjski Mostar (Bosnia and Herzegovina)	1–0	(Sweden) Malmö FF
Šovšić 90+1' (pen.)	Report

Stadion Pecara, Široki Brijeg (Note: Zrinjski Mostar played their third qualifying round home match at Stadion Pecara, Široki Brijeg, instead of their regular stadium Stadion pod Bijelim Brijegom, Mostar.)
Attendance: 4,509
Referee: Artyom Kuchin (Kazakhstan)

Malmö FF won 3–1 on aggregate.

8 August 2019
19:30 (20:30 UTC+3)

CSKA Sofia (Bulgaria)	1–1	(Ukraine) Zorya Luhansk
Evandro 13'	Report	Yurchenko 45+1' (pen.)

Vasil Levski National Stadium, Sofia (Note: CSKA Sofia played their third qualifying round home match at Vasil Levski National Stadium, Sofia, instead of their regular stadium Stadion Balgarska Armia, Sofia.)
Attendance: 15,310
Referee: Sandro Schärer (Switzerland)
15 August 2019
19:00 (20:00 UTC+3)

Zorya Luhansk (Ukraine)	1–0	(Bulgaria) CSKA Sofia
Rusyn 89'	Report

Slavutych-Arena, Zaporizhia (Note: Zorya Luhansk played their home matches at Slavutych-Arena, Zaporizhia, instead of their regular stadium Avanhard Stadium, Luhansk due to the war conditions in Eastern Ukraine.)
Attendance: 7,857
Referee: Amaury Delerue (France)

Zorya Luhansk won 2–1 on aggregate.

8 August 2019
19:00 (21:00 UTC+4)

Neftçi (Azerbaijan)	2–2	(Israel) Bnei Yehuda
Joseph-Monrose 43'; Alaskarov 90+7'	Report	Sagas 26'; Ghadir 36'

Bakcell Arena, Baku
Attendance: 10,000
Referee: Karim Abed (France)
15 August 2019
19:00 (20:00 UTC+3)

Bnei Yehuda (Israel)	2–1	(Azerbaijan) Neftçi
Jan 15'; Sagas 66'	Report	Mahmudov 90+3' (pen.)

HaMoshava Stadium, Petah Tikva (Note: Bnei Yehuda played their home matches at HaMoshava Stadium, Petah Tikva, instead of their regular stadium Bloomfield Stadium, Tel Aviv which is undergoing renovation.)
Attendance: 4,000
Referee: Daniele Doveri (Italy)

Bnei Yehuda won 4–3 on aggregate.

8 August 2019
21:00

Luzern (Switzerland)	0–3	(Spain) Espanyol
	Report	Ferreyra 28'; Vilà 59'; Vargas 89'

Swissporarena, Lucerne
Attendance: 9,191
Referee: Fran Jović (Croatia)
15 August 2019
21:00

Espanyol (Spain)	3–0	(Switzerland) Luzern
Wu Lei 3'; Campuzano 27', 38'	Report

RCDE Stadium, Cornellà de Llobregat
Attendance: 13,214
Referee: Jorge Sousa (Portugal)

Espanyol won 6–0 on aggregate.

8 August 2019
18:00

Sparta Prague (Czech Republic)	2–2	(Turkey) Trabzonspor
Costa 16'; Kanga 68'	Report	Ekuban 84'; Sørloth 89'

Stadion Letná, Prague
Attendance: 0
Referee: José Luis Munuera Montero (Spain)
15 August 2019
19:30 (20:30 UTC+3)

Trabzonspor (Turkey)	2–1	(Czech Republic) Sparta Prague
Sørloth 11'; Novák 90+8'	Report	Hložek 78'

Şenol Güneş Stadium, Trabzon
Attendance: 34,462
Referee: Jakob Kehlet (Denmark)

Trabzonspor won 4–3 on aggregate.

8 August 2019
18:15 (19:15 UTC+3)

Universitatea Craiova (Romania)	0–2	(Greece) AEK Athens
	Report	Mantalos 60'; Livaja 85'

Stadionul Ion Oblemenco, Craiova
Attendance: 2,530
Referee: Dennis Higler (Netherlands)
15 August 2019
20:00 (21:00 UTC+3)

AEK Athens (Greece)	1–1	(Romania) Universitatea Craiova
Mantalos 26'	Report	Ivanov 63'

Olympic Stadium, Athens
Attendance: 0
Referee: Jérôme Brisard (France)

AEK Athens won 3–1 on aggregate.

== Play-off round ==
=== Summary ===
The first legs were played on 22 August, and the second legs on 29 August 2019.

Team 1	Agg.	Team 2	1st leg	2nd leg
Champions Path
Sūduva (Lithuania)	2–4	(Hungary) Ferencváros	0–0	2–4
Copenhagen (Denmark)	3–2	(Latvia) Riga	3–1	0–1
Celtic (Scotland)	6–1	(Sweden) AIK	2–0	4–1
Ararat-Armenia	3–3 (4–5 p)	(Luxembourg) F91 Dudelange	2–1	1–2 (a.e.t.)
Ludogorets Razgrad (Bulgaria)	2–2 (a)	(Slovenia) Maribor	0–0	2–2
Linfield (Northern Ireland)	4–4 (a)	(Azerbaijan) Qarabağ	3–2	1–2
Slovan Bratislava (Slovakia)	3–3 (a)	(Greece) PAOK	1–0	2–3
Astana (Kazakhstan)	3–2	(Belarus) BATE Borisov	3–0	0–2
Main Path
Torino (Italy)	3–5	(England) Wolverhampton Wanderers	2–3	1–2
Legia Warsaw (Poland)	0–1	(Scotland) Rangers	0–0	0–1
FCSB (Romania)	0–1	(Portugal) Vitória de Guimarães	0–0	0–1
PSV Eindhoven (Netherlands)	7–0	(Cyprus) Apollon Limassol	3–0	4–0
AEK Athens (Greece)	3–3 (a)	(Turkey) Trabzonspor	1–3	2–0
Feyenoord (Netherlands)	6–0	(Israel) Hapoel Be'er Sheva	3–0	3–0
Gent (Belgium)	3–2	(Croatia) Rijeka	2–1	1–1
Espanyol (Spain)	5–3	(Ukraine) Zorya Luhansk	3–1	2–2
Partizan (Serbia)	3–2	(Norway) Molde	2–1	1–1
Braga (Portugal)	3–1	(Russia) Spartak Moscow	1–0	2–1
Malmö FF (Sweden)	4–0	(Israel) Bnei Yehuda	3–0	1–0
Strasbourg (France)	1–3	(Germany) Eintracht Frankfurt	1–0	0–3
AZ (Netherlands)	5–2	(Belgium) Antwerp	1–1	4–1 (a.e.t.)

=== Champions Path matches ===
22 August 2019
19:00 (20:00 UTC+3)

Sūduva (Lithuania)	0–0	(Hungary) Ferencváros
	Report

Sūduva Stadium, Marijampolė
Attendance: 5,741
Referee: Manuel Schüttengruber (Austria)
29 August 2019
20:00

Ferencváros (Hungary)	4–2	(Lithuania) Sūduva
R. Varga 36' (pen.); Boli 45+1'; Nguen 66'; Signevich 90+6' (pen.)	Report	Verbickas 11'; Topčagić 64'

Groupama Arena, Budapest
Attendance: 18,567
Referee: Marco Guida (Italy)

Ferencváros won 4–2 on aggregate.

22 August 2019
19:45

Copenhagen (Denmark)	3–1	(Latvia) Riga
Fischer 18'; Sotiriou 62' (pen.); Daramy 90+3'	Report	Kamešs 41'

Parken Stadium, Copenhagen
Attendance: 13,930
Referee: Bas Nijhuis (Netherlands)
29 August 2019
18:45 (19:45 UTC+3)

Riga (Latvia)	1–0	(Denmark) Copenhagen
Brisola 75'	Report

Skonto Stadium, Riga
Attendance: 7,055
Referee: Paweł Gil (Poland)

Copenhagen won 3–2 on aggregate.

22 August 2019
20:45 (19:45 UTC+1)

Celtic (Scotland)	2–0	(Sweden) AIK
Forrest 48'; Édouard 73'	Report

Celtic Park, Glasgow
Attendance: 40,885
Referee: Tamás Bognár (Hungary)
29 August 2019
19:00

AIK (Sweden)	1–4	(Scotland) Celtic
Larsson 33' (pen.)	Report	Forrest 17'; Johnston 34'; Jullien 87'; Morgan 90+3'

Friends Arena, Solna
Attendance: 28,410
Referee: Nikola Dabanović (Montenegro)

Celtic won 6–1 on aggregate.

22 August 2019
17:00 (19:00 UTC+4)

Ararat-Armenia	2–1	(Luxembourg) F91 Dudelange
Lima 22'; Antonov 90+3'	Report	Sinani 68'

Vazgen Sargsyan Republican Stadium, Yerevan
Attendance: 11,000
Referee: Harald Lechner (Austria)
29 August 2019
20:00

F91 Dudelange (Luxembourg)	2–1 (a.e.t.)	Ararat-Armenia
Sinani 48' (pen.), 71'	Report	Lima 24'
Penalties
Lavie (penalty scored); Morren (penalty missed); Bougrine (penalty scored); Natami (penalty scored); Sinani (penalty scored); Schnell (penalty scored)	5–4	(penalty missed) Avetisyan; (penalty scored) Alphonse; (penalty scored) Lima; (penalty scored) Meneses; (penalty scored) Louis; (penalty missed) Pashov

Stade Josy Barthel, Luxembourg City
Attendance: 2,874
Referee: Aleksandar Stavrev (North Macedonia)

3–3 on aggregate; F91 Dudelange won 5–4 on penalties.

22 August 2019
19:30 (20:30 UTC+3)

Ludogorets Razgrad (Bulgaria)	0–0	(Slovenia) Maribor
	Report

Ludogorets Arena, Razgrad
Attendance: 6,200
Referee: Jakob Kehlet (Denmark)
29 August 2019
20:15

Maribor (Slovenia)	2–2	(Bulgaria) Ludogorets Razgrad
Tavares 65'; Vancaš 72'	Report	Marcelinho 17'; Keșerü 26' (pen.)

Ljudski vrt, Maribor
Attendance: 9,016
Referee: Craig Pawson (England)

2–2 on aggregate; Ludogorets Razgrad won on away goals.

22 August 2019
20:45 (19:45 UTC+1)

Linfield (Northern Ireland)	3–2	(Azerbaijan) Qarabağ
Stafford 40'; Lavery 45+1', 75'	Report	Rherras 15'; Gueye 90+3' (pen.)

Windsor Park, Belfast
Attendance: 4,633
Referee: Sandro Schärer (Switzerland)
29 August 2019
18:00 (20:00 UTC+4)

Qarabağ (Azerbaijan)	2–1	(Northern Ireland) Linfield
Jaime Romero 6'; Zoubir 88'	Report	Lavery 90+3'

Tofiq Bahramov Republican Stadium, Baku (Note: Qarabağ played their home match at Tofiq Bahramov Republican Stadium, Baku, instead of their regular stadium Azersun Arena, Baku.)
Attendance: 18,349
Referee: Sergey Ivanov (Russia)

4–4 on aggregate; Qarabağ won on away goals.

22 August 2019
21:00

Slovan Bratislava (Slovakia)	1–0	(Greece) PAOK
Abena 90+4'	Report

Tehelné pole, Bratislava
Attendance: 20,233
Referee: Ivan Bebek (Croatia)
29 August 2019
19:00 (20:00 UTC+3)

PAOK (Greece)	3–2	(Slovakia) Slovan Bratislava
Limnios 49'; Świderski 50'; Giannoulis 87'	Report	Medveděv 38'; De Marco 62'

Toumba Stadium, Thessaloniki
Attendance: 20,776
Referee: Andreas Ekberg (Sweden)

3–3 on aggregate; Slovan Bratislava won on away goals.

22 August 2019
16:00 (20:00 UTC+6)

Astana (Kazakhstan)	3–0	(Belarus) BATE Borisov
Tomasov 23'; Logvinenko 44'; Sigurjónsson 52' (pen.)	Report

Astana Arena, Nur-Sultan
Attendance: 24,369
Referee: Serhiy Boyko (Ukraine)
29 August 2019
19:00 (20:00 UTC+3)

BATE Borisov (Belarus)	2–0	(Kazakhstan) Astana
Skavysh 6'; Yablonskiy 85'	Report

Borisov Arena, Barysaw
Attendance: 10,701
Referee: Bobby Madden (Scotland)

Astana won 3–2 on aggregate.

=== Main Path matches ===
22 August 2019
21:00

Torino (Italy)	2–3	(England) Wolverhampton Wanderers
De Silvestri 61'; Belotti 89' (pen.)	Report	Bremer 43' (o.g.); Jota 59'; Jiménez 72'

Stadio Olimpico, Turin
Attendance: 24,091
Referee: Artur Soares Dias (Portugal)
29 August 2019
20:45 (19:45 UTC+1)

Wolverhampton Wanderers (England)	2–1	(Italy) Torino
Jiménez 30'; Dendoncker 59'	Report	Belotti 58'

Molineux Stadium, Wolverhampton
Attendance: 29,222
Referee: Jesús Gil Manzano (Spain)

Wolverhampton Wanderers won 5–3 on aggregate.

22 August 2019
20:00

Legia Warsaw (Poland)	0–0	(Scotland) Rangers
	Report

Polish Army Stadium, Warsaw
Attendance: 26,665
Referee: Benoît Bastien (France)
29 August 2019
20:45 (19:45 UTC+1)

Rangers (Scotland)	1–0	(Poland) Legia Warsaw
Morelos 90+1'	Report

Ibrox Stadium, Glasgow
Attendance: 45,463
Referee: Slavko Vinčić (Slovenia)

Rangers won 1–0 on aggregate.

22 August 2019
20:30 (21:30 UTC+3)

FCSB (Romania)	0–0	(Portugal) Vitória de Guimarães
	Report

Stadionul Marin Anastasovici, Giurgiu
Attendance: 4,518
Referee: Matej Jug (Slovenia)
29 August 2019
21:00 (20:00 UTC+1)

Vitória de Guimarães (Portugal)	1–0	(Romania) FCSB
Tapsoba 53' (pen.)	Report

Estádio D. Afonso Henriques, Guimarães
Attendance: 18,352
Referee: Irfan Peljto (Bosnia and Herzegovina)

Vitória de Guimarães won 1–0 on aggregate.

22 August 2019
20:30

PSV Eindhoven (Netherlands)	3–0	(Cyprus) Apollon Limassol
Ihattaren 47'; Gakpo 56'; Dumfries 61'	Report

Philips Stadion, Eindhoven
Attendance: 17,500
Referee: Aleksei Kulbakov (Belarus)
29 August 2019
19:00 (20:00 UTC+3)

Apollon Limassol (Cyprus)	0–4	(Netherlands) PSV Eindhoven
	Report	Ihattaren 73'; Mitroglou 76'; Malen 79', 90+4'

GSP Stadium, Nicosia
Attendance: 2,004
Referee: Willie Collum (Scotland)

PSV Eindhoven won 7–0 on aggregate.

22 August 2019
20:00 (21:00 UTC+3)

AEK Athens (Greece)	1–3	(Turkey) Trabzonspor
Livaja 4'	Report	Ekuban 29', 44', 70'

Olympic Stadium, Athens
Attendance: 141
Referee: Daniel Siebert (Germany)
29 August 2019
19:30 (20:30 UTC+3)

Trabzonspor (Turkey)	0–2	(Greece) AEK Athens
	Report	Livaja 24'; Mantalos 30' (pen.)

Şenol Güneş Stadium, Trabzon
Attendance: 30,490
Referee: Michael Oliver (England)

3–3 on aggregate; Trabzonspor won on away goals.

22 August 2019
19:30

Feyenoord (Netherlands)	3–0	(Israel) Hapoel Be'er Sheva
Larsson 33'; Fer 56', 78'	Report

De Kuip, Rotterdam
Attendance: 35,000
Referee: Andris Treimanis (Latvia)
29 August 2019
19:30 (20:30 UTC+3)

Hapoel Be'er Sheva (Israel)	0–3	(Netherlands) Feyenoord
	Report	Kökçü 46'; Berghuis 52'; Burger 61'

Turner Stadium, Be'er Sheva
Attendance: 9,107
Referee: Gediminas Mažeika (Lithuania)

Feyenoord won 6–0 on aggregate.

22 August 2019
20:30

Gent (Belgium)	2–1	(Croatia) Rijeka
Depoitre 57', 71'	Report	Halilović 39'

Ghelamco Arena, Ghent
Attendance: 12,198
Referee: Daniel Stefański (Poland)
29 August 2019
20:00

Rijeka (Croatia)	1–1	(Belgium) Gent
Puljić 32'	Report	Plastun 33'

Stadion Rujevica, Rijeka
Attendance: 7,562
Referee: François Letexier (France)

Gent won 3–2 on aggregate.

22 August 2019
21:00

Espanyol (Spain)	3–1	(Ukraine) Zorya Luhansk
Ferreyra 58'; J. López 79'; Vargas 81'	Report	Kocherhin 38'

RCDE Stadium, Cornellà de Llobregat
Attendance: 13,686
Referee: Tobias Stieler (Germany)
29 August 2019
19:00 (20:00 UTC+3)

Zorya Luhansk (Ukraine)	2–2	(Spain) Espanyol
Lyednyev 54'; Rusyn 78'	Report	Ferreyra 34'; Vargas 62'

Slavutych-Arena, Zaporizhia
Attendance: 10,181
Referee: Radu Petrescu (Romania)

Espanyol won 5–3 on aggregate.

22 August 2019
21:00

Partizan (Serbia)	2–1	(Norway) Molde
Soumah 45+1'; Tošić 84'	Report	Bolly 44'

Partizan Stadium, Belgrade
Attendance: 3,157
Referee: Viktor Kassai (Hungary)
29 August 2019
19:00

Molde (Norway)	1–1	(Serbia) Partizan
James 72'	Report	N. R. Miletić 80'

Aker Stadion, Molde
Attendance: 7,102
Referee: Ruddy Buquet (France)

Partizan won 3–2 on aggregate.

22 August 2019
20:45 (19:45 UTC+1)

Braga (Portugal)	1–0	(Russia) Spartak Moscow
R. Horta 74'	Report

Estadio Municipal, Braga
Attendance: 11,667
Referee: Xavier Estrada Fernández (Spain)
29 August 2019
19:15 (20:15 UTC+3)

Spartak Moscow (Russia)	1–2	(Portugal) Braga
Bakayev 89'	Report	R. Horta 42', 45+3'

Otkritie Arena, Moscow
Attendance: 38,176
Referee: Davide Massa (Italy)

Braga won 3–1 on aggregate.

22 August 2019
19:00

Malmö FF (Sweden)	3–0	(Israel) Bnei Yehuda
Rosenberg 36'; Bengtsson 40'; Lewicki 47'	Report

Eleda Stadion, Malmö
Attendance: 13,956
Referee: Paweł Raczkowski (Poland)
29 August 2019
19:00 (20:00 UTC+3)

Bnei Yehuda (Israel)	0–1	(Sweden) Malmö FF
	Report	Molins 7'

HaMoshava Stadium, Petah Tikva
Attendance: 900
Referee: Serdar Gözübüyük (Netherlands)

Malmö FF won 4–0 on aggregate.

22 August 2019
20:30

Strasbourg (France)	1–0	(Germany) Eintracht Frankfurt
Zohi 33'	Report

Stade de la Meinau, Strasbourg
Attendance: 21,708
Referee: Ivan Kružliak (Slovakia)
29 August 2019
20:30

Eintracht Frankfurt (Germany)	3–0	(France) Strasbourg
Mitrović 27' (o.g.); Kostić 60'; Da Costa 66'	Report

Waldstadion, Frankfurt
Attendance: 47,000
Referee: Orel Grinfeld (Israel)

Eintracht Frankfurt won 3–1 on aggregate.

22 August 2019
20:30

AZ (Netherlands)	1–1	(Belgium) Antwerp
Boadu 82'	Report	Batubinsika 38'

De Grolsch Veste, Enschede
Attendance: 4,014
Referee: Srđan Jovanović (Serbia)
29 August 2019
19:30

Antwerp (Belgium)	1–4 (a.e.t.)	(Netherlands) AZ
Lamkel Zé 73'	Report	Stengs 90'; Druijf 96'; Koopmeiners 102' (pen.); Guðmundsson 113'

King Baudouin Stadium, Brussels
Attendance: 19,786
Referee: Anastasios Sidiropoulos (Greece)

AZ won 5–2 on aggregate.
