= 2022–23 FC Alashkert season =

Alashkert
2022-23 season
- Chairman: Bagrat Navoyan
- Manager: Karen Barseghyan (until 24 December); Vahe Gevorgyan (from 24 December)
- Stadium: Alashkert Stadium
- Premier League: 4th
- Armenian Cup: Quarterfinal vs Gandzasar Kapan
- Europa Conference League: First Qualifying Round vs Ħamrun Spartans
- Top goalscorer: League: Bladimir Díaz (11); All: Bladimir Díaz (12)
- Highest home attendance: 7,000 vs Kairat (12 August 2021)
- Lowest home attendance: 250 vs Noah (27 October 2021)
- Average home league attendance: 2,364 (8 November 2021)
Home colours	Away colours

The 2022–23 season was Alashkert's eleventh season in the Armenian Premier League and sixteenth overall.

== Season events ==
On 27 June, Alashkert announced the signings of Bladimir Díaz from FAS and Fáider Burbano from Águila.

On 22 July, Alashkert announced the signing of Ronald Cuéllar from Nacional Potosí.

On 30 August. Alashkert announced that they had terminated their contracts with David Khurtsidze and Aleksandr Karapetyan by mutual consent.

On 9 September, Alashkert announced the signing of Sergei Ivanov from Zenit St.Petersburg.

On 13 September, Alashkert announced the signing of Narek Manukyan from Kaluga, whilst Kevin Reyes signed from FAS on 14 September, and Lucas Ventura joined from Malacateco on 15 September.

On 26 September, Alashkert announced the signing of free-agent Sergei Revyakin.

On 24 December, Alashkert announced that Vahe Gevorgyan had been appointed as their new head coach, and that they had released Tiago Cametá, James, Didier Kadio, Deou Dosa, Lucas Ventura, Wangu Gome, Béko Fofana, Sargis Metoyan, Benik Hovhannisyan, Karapet Manukyan, Bladimir Díaz, Kevin Reyes and Ronald Cuéllar.

On 5 January, Andranik Voskanyan left the club after his contract was terminated by mutual consent.

On 14 January, Alashkert announced the signing of Vitali Ustinov.

On 16 January, Alashkert loaned Wbeymar and Agdon from Ararat-Armenia for the remainder of the season.

On 18 January, Alashkert announced the signing of Daniel Carrillo from KuPS. The following day, 19 January, Alashkert announced the signing of Aram Kocharyan from Vitebsk.

On 21 January, Alashkert announced the return of Uroš Nenadović, with Yeison Racines signing from Lernayin Artsakh the following day.

On 24 January, Alashkert announced the signing of Karen Nalbandyan, who'd previously played for Noah.

On 27 January, Alashkert announced the signing of Timur Rudoselsky from Turan.

On 28 January, Alashkert announced the departure of Arman Meliksetyan, Sergei Revyakin, Rumyan Hovsepyan, Vahagn Ayvazyan and Fáider Burbano.

On 30 January, Alashkert announced the signings of Serob Grigoryan from BKMA Yerevan, and Arman Khachatryan who'd most recently played for Noah.

On 31 January, Alashkert announced the signing of Mateo Mužek from Kyzylzhar.

On 5 February, Alashkert announced the signing of Artur Miranyan who'd previously left Urartu in the summer of 2022.

On 12 February, Alashkert announced the signing of Roman Mysak who'd previously left Desna Chernihiv in the summer of 2022.

On 20 February, Alashkert announced the signing of Ivan Pešić who'd previously played for Caspiy.

== Squad ==
As of match played 6 June 2023

Number	Name	Nationality	Position	Date of birth (age)	Signed from	Signed in	Contract ends	Apps.	Goals
Goalkeepers
1	Sevak Aslanyan	(Armenia)	GK	17 May 1998 (aged 25)	Unattached	2022		0	0
22	Ognjen Čančarević	(Serbia)	GK	25 September 1989 (aged 33)	Radnik Surdulica	2018		175	0
71	Roman Mysak	(Ukraine)	GK	9 September 1991 (aged 31)	Unattached	2023		3	0
Defenders
2	Serob Grigoryan	(Armenia)	DF	4 February 1995 (aged 28)	BKMA Yerevan	2023		6	0
3	Taron Voskanyan	(Armenia)	DF	22 February 1993 (aged 30)	Nea Salamis Famagusta	2018		158	5
4	Annan Mensah	(Ghana)	DF	6 July 1996 (aged 26)	Urartu	2022		31	3
15	Arman Khachatryan	(Armenia)	DF	9 June 1997 (aged 25)	Unattached	2023		1	0
27	Daniel Carrillo	(Venezuela)	DF	2 December 1995 (aged 27)	KuPS	2023		15	0
33	Vitali Ustinov	(Russia)	DF	1 May 1991 (aged 32)	Torpedo-BelAZ Zhodino	2023		15	2
70	Timur Rudoselsky	(Kazakhstan)	DF	21 December 1994 (aged 28)	Turan	2023		9	0
77	Mateo Mužek	(Croatia)	DF	29 April 1995 (aged 28)	Kyzylzhar	2023		16	2
Midfielders
5	Wbeymar	(Armenia)	MF	6 March 1992 (aged 31)	on loan from Ararat-Armenia	2023	2023	11	0
7	Karen Nalbandyan	(Armenia)	MF	14 April 2002 (aged 21)	Unattached	2023		11	0
8	Sergei Ivanov	(Russia)	MF	7 January 1997 (aged 26)	Zenit St.Petersburg	2022		15	4
9	Narek Manukyan	(Armenia)	MF	19 December 2003 (aged 19)	Kaluga	2022		1	0
11	Sargis Shahinyan	(Armenia)	MF	10 September 1995 (aged 27)	Ararat-Armenia	2022		34	0
17	Artak Yedigaryan	(Armenia)	MF	18 March 1990 (aged 33)	Ararat Yerevan	2021		211	48
21	Artak Grigoryan	(Armenia)	MF	19 October 1987 (aged 35)	Mika	2015		262	5
88	Aram Kocharyan	(Armenia)	MF	5 March 1996 (aged 27)	Vitebsk	2023		12	0
98	Ivan Pešić	(Croatia)	MF	6 April 1992 (aged 31)	Unattached	2023		11	1
Forwards
10	Artur Miranyan	(Armenia)	FW	27 December 1995 (aged 27)	Unattached	2023		16	3
20	Thiago Galvão	(Brazil)	FW	24 August 1989 (aged 33)	Floriana	2019		92	24
86	Grigor Nikoghosyan	(Armenia)	FW	28 April 2006 (aged 17)	Academy	2022		2	0
94	Uroš Nenadović	(Serbia)	FW	24 January 1994 (aged 29)	Unattached	2023		104	23
95	Agdon Menezes	(Brazil)	FW	26 January 1993 (aged 30)	on loan from Ararat-Armenia	2023	2023	12	2
99	Yeison Racines	(Ecuador)	FW	7 October 1998 (aged 24)	Lernayin Artsakh	2023		12	2
Away on loan
Left during the season
2	Tiago Cametá	(Brazil)	DF	5 May 1992 (aged 31)	Vila Nova	2019		115	0
5	Didier Kadio	(Ivory Coast)	DF	5 April 1990 (aged 33)	Al-Hilal	2021		81	1
7	Wangu Gome	(Namibia)	MF	13 February 1993 (aged 30)	Cape Umoya United	2020		90	5
9	Aleksandr Karapetyan	(Armenia)	FW	23 December 1987 (aged 35)	Unattached	2022		8	0
12	Arman Meliksetyan	(Armenia)	GK	21 July 1995 (aged 27)	Van	2022		0	0
15	Béko Fofana	(Ivory Coast)	FW	8 September 1988 (aged 34)	IMT	2021		38	4
19	Deou Dosa	(Nigeria)	DF	29 July 1998 (aged 24)	Van	2021		12	1
27	David Khurtsidze	(Russia)	MF	4 July 1993 (aged 29)	Ararat Yerevan	2021		47	7
27	Lucas Ventura	(Brazil)	MF	23 May 1997 (aged 26)	Malacateco	2022		7	0
33	Andranik Voskanyan	(Armenia)	DF	11 April 1990 (aged 33)	Unattached	2022		17	0
55	Sargis Metoyan	(Armenia)	FW	6 September 1997 (aged 25)	Csíkszereda Miercurea Ciuc	2022		17	1
70	Benik Hovhannisyan	(Armenia)	MF	1 May 1993 (aged 30)	Van	2022		16	0
71	Sergei Revyakin	(Russia)	GK	2 April 1995 (aged 28)	Unattached	2022		1	0
77	Rumyan Hovsepyan	(Armenia)	MF	13 November 1991 (aged 31)	Floriana	2022		65	2
85	Alexander Ter-Tovmasyan	(Armenia)	FW	1 June 2003 (aged 20)	Pyunik	2022		3	0
88	James	(Brazil)	DF	15 July 1995 (aged 27)	Urartu	2021		63	3
94	Karapet Manukyan	(Armenia)	FW	25 July 1992 (aged 30)	West Armenia	2021		7	0
95	Bladimir Díaz	(Colombia)	FW	10 July 1992 (aged 30)	FAS	2022		22	12
96	Kevin Reyes	(El Salvador)	FW	28 August 1999 (aged 23)	FAS	2022		11	4
97	Ronald Cuéllar	(Bolivia)	MF	9 June 1997 (aged 25)	Nacional Potosí	2022		15	2
98	Vahagn Ayvazyan	(Armenia)	DF	16 April 1992 (aged 31)	Unattached	2022		19	2
99	Fáider Burbano	(Colombia)	FW	19 June 1992 (aged 30)	Águila	2022		7	0

== Transfers ==
=== In ===
Date	Position	Nationality	Name	From	Fee	Ref.
1 July 2022	DF	(Ghana)	Annan Mensah	Urartu	Undisclosed	
1 July 2022	MF	(Armenia)	Benik Hovhannisyan	Van	Undisclosed	
1 July 2022	MF	(Armenia)	Rumyan Hovsepyan	Floriana	Undisclosed	
1 July 2022	MF	(Armenia)	Sargis Shahinyan	Ararat-Armenia	Undisclosed	
1 July 2022	FW	(Armenia)	Sargis Metoyan	Csíkszereda Miercurea Ciuc	Undisclosed	
1 July 2022	FW	(Brazil)	Thiago Galvão	Pyunik	Undisclosed	
6 July 2022	MF	(Bolivia)	Ronald Cuéllar	Nacional Potosí	Undisclosed	
22 July 2022	FW	(Colombia)	Fáider Burbano	Águila	Undisclosed	
22 July 2022	FW	(Colombia)	Bladimir Díaz	FAS	Undisclosed	
28 July 2022	GK	(Armenia)	Arman Meliksetyan	Van	Undisclosed	
9 September 2022	MF	(Russia)	Sergei Ivanov	Zenit St.Petersburg	Undisclosed	
13 September 2022	MF	(Armenia)	Narek Manukyan	Kaluga	Undisclosed	
14 September 2022	FW	(El Salvador)	Kevin Reyes	FAS	Undisclosed	
15 September 2022	MF	(Brazil)	Lucas Ventura	Malacateco	Undisclosed	
26 September 2022	GK	(Russia)	Sergei Revyakin	Unattached	Free	
14 January 2023	DF	(Russia)	Vitali Ustinov	Torpedo-BelAZ Zhodino	Undisclosed	
18 January 2023	DF	(Venezuela)	Daniel Carrillo	KuPS	Undisclosed	
19 January 2023	MF	(Armenia)	Aram Kocharyan	Vitebsk	Undisclosed	
21 January 2023	FW	(Serbia)	Uroš Nenadović	Unattached	Free	
22 January 2023	FW	(Ecuador)	Yeison Racines	Lernayin Artsakh	Undisclosed	
24 January 2023	MF	(Armenia)	Karen Nalbandyan	Unattached	Free	
27 January 2023	DF	(Kazakhstan)	Timur Rudoselsky	Turan	Undisclosed	
30 January 2023	DF	(Armenia)	Serob Grigoryan	BKMA Yerevan	Undisclosed	
30 January 2023	DF	(Armenia)	Arman Khachatryan	Unattached	Free	
31 January 2023	DF	(Croatia)	Mateo Mužek	Kyzylzhar	Undisclosed	
5 February 2023	FW	(Armenia)	Artur Miranyan	Unattached	Free	
12 February 2023	GK	(Ukraine)	Roman Mysak	Unattached	Free	
20 February 2023	MF	(Croatia)	Ivan Pešić	Unattached	Free	

=== Loans in ===
Date from	Position	Nationality	Name	From	Date to	Ref.
16 January 2023	MF	(Armenia)	Wbeymar	Ararat-Armenia	30 June 2023	
16 January 2023	FW	(Brazil)	Agdon	Ararat-Armenia	30 June 2023	

=== Out ===
Date	Position	Nationality	Name	To	Fee	Ref.
18 February 2023	FW	(Armenia)	Aleksandr Ter-Tovmasyan	Ararat Yerevan	Undisclosed	

=== Released ===
Date	Position	Nationality	Name	Joined	Date	Ref.
30 August 2022	MF	(Russia)	David Khurtsidze	Urartu	9 September 2022	
30 August 2022	FW	(Armenia)	Aleksandr Karapetyan	Pyunik	2 September 2022	
24 December 2022	DF	(Brazil)	James	Pyunik	18 January 2023	
24 December 2022	DF	(Brazil)	Tiago Cametá	Alashkert	26 June 2023	
24 December 2022	DF	(Ivory Coast)	Didier Kadio	Zhetysu	24 January 2023	
24 December 2022	DF	(Nigeria)	Deou Dosa	Lernayin Artsakh	27 February 2023	
24 December 2022	MF	(Armenia)	Benik Hovhannisyan			
24 December 2022	MF	(Bolivia)	Ronald Cuéllar	Club Blooming	12 January 2023	
24 December 2022	MF	(Brazil)	Lucas Ventura	Anápolis	3 February 2023	
24 December 2022	MF	(Namibia)	Wangu Gome	Ongos Valley		
24 December 2022	FW	(Armenia)	Karapet Manukyan	West Armenia	1 February 2023	
24 December 2022	FW	(Armenia)	Sargis Metoyan	West Armenia	22 January 2023	
24 December 2022	FW	(Colombia)	Bladimir Díaz	Al-Diriyah	1 January 2023	
24 December 2022	FW	(El Salvador)	Kevin Reyes	FAS	1 January 2023	
24 December 2022	FW	(Ivory Coast)	Béko Fofana			
5 January 2023	DF	(Armenia)	Andranik Voskanyan			
28 January 2023	GK	(Armenia)	Arman Meliksetyan			
28 January 2023	GK	(Russia)	Sergei Revyakin	Ararat Yerevan	17 February 2023	
28 January 2023	DF	(Armenia)	Vahagn Ayvazyan			
28 January 2023	MF	(Armenia)	Rumyan Hovsepyan	Van	15 February 2023	
28 January 2023	FW	(Colombia)	Fáider Burbano			

== Friendlies ==
28 January 2023	Alashkert	1–2	Podbeskidzie Bielsko-Biała	Belek, Turkey
16:00 (UTC+4)	N.Manukyan 73'	Report	42' (o.g.); 90'

1 February 2023	Alashkert	0–1	Yenisey Krasnoyarsk	Belek, Turkey
18:30 (UTC+4)		Report	Goal

5 February 2023	Alashkert	1–0	Neftchi Fergana	Belek, Turkey
18:30 (UTC+4)	Y.Racines 53'	Report

9 February 2023	Alashkert	2–0	Zorya Luhansk	Belek, Turkey
12:00 (UTC+4)	Nenadović 12', 28'	Report

13 February 2023	Alashkert	1–1	Buxoro	Belek, Turkey
12:00 (UTC+4)	Yedigaryan 54' (pen.)	Report	Goal

13 February 2023	Alashkert	2–0	Kyzylzhar	Belek, Turkey
18:30 (UTC+4)	Voskanyan 11'; Nenadović 62'	Report

21 February 2023	Ararat Yerevan	1–2	Alashkert	Dzoraghbyur
13:00 (UTC+4)	Babaliev 58'	Report	Pešić 62'; Miranyan 77'	Stadium: Dzoraghbyur Training Centre

== Competitions ==
=== Overall record ===
Competition	First match	Last match	Starting round	Final position	Record							
Competition	First match	Last match	Starting round	Final position	Pld	W	D	L	GF	GA	GD	Win %
Premier League	30 July 2022	6 June 2023	Matchday 1	4th	36	20	6	10	58	37	+21	55.56
Armenian Cup	5 October 2022	25 November 2022	First Round	Quarterfinal	2	1	1	0	4	1	+3	50.00
UEFA Europa Conference League	7 July 2022	14 July 2022	First qualifying round	First qualifying round	2	1	0	1	2	4	−2	50.00
Total					40	22	7	11	64	42	+22	55.00

Last updated: 6 June 2023
Source: Competitions

=== Premier League ===
==== Results summary ====
Overall								Home						Away					
Pld	W	D	L	GF	GA	GD	Pts	W	D	L	GF	GA	GD	W	D	L	GF	GA	GD
36	20	6	10	58	37	+21	66	10	4	4	30	12	+18	10	2	6	28	25	+3

Last updated: 6 June 2023.
Source: See Results

==== Results by round ====
Round	1	2	3	4	5	6	7	8	9	10	11	12	13	14	15	16	17	18	19	20	21	22	23	24	25	26	27	28	29	30	31	32	33	34	35	36
Ground	A	H	A	H	A	H	A	H	A	H	A	H	A	H	A	H	A	H	A	H	A	H	A	H	A	H	A	H	A	H	A	H	A	H	A	H
Result	W	W	W	D	W	W	D	D	L	W	W	W	L	W	W	D	L	L	L	L	W	D	D	W	L	W	L	W	W	W	W	L	W	W	W	L
Position	1	1	1	1	1	1	1	2	3	2	2	2	2	2	2	2	3	3	3	4	4	4	4	4	4	4	4	4	4	4	4	4	4	4	4	4

Updated to match(es) played on 6 June 2023. Source: See Results
A = Away; H = Home; W = Win; D = Draw; L = Loss; P = Postponed; V = Void

==== Results ====
30 July 2022 1	Noah	3–4	Alashkert	Armavir
17:0 (UTC+4)	Friday 7'; Khachatryan (yellow card) 27'; Afajanyan 59'; Salou 83'; Ebenezer (yellow card) 88'	Report	Mensah 13'; Yedigaryan 17' (pen.); Díaz 38'; T.Voskanyan (yellow card) 42'; Gome (yellow card) 82'; Galvão 90+3'	Stadium: Armavir City Stadium; Referee: Vardan Mamnukyan

6 August 2022 2	Alashkert	2–0	Ararat Yerevan	Yerevan
18:00 (UTC+4)	Hovsepyan (yellow card) 33'; Mensah (yellow card) 47'; Díaz 56'; Metoyan 89'	Report	G.Malakyan (yellow card) 45+2'	Stadium: Alashkert Stadium; Referee: Artem Gasparyan

12 August 2022 3	Lernayin Artsakh	0–1	Alashkert	Vayk
17:00 (UTC+4)	Angulo (yellow card) 55'; Asryan (yellow card) 90'; Harutyunyan (yellow card) 90'	Report	T.Voskanyan (yellow card) 90+4'; Cuéllar 90+6'	Stadium: Arevik Stadium; Referee: Zaven Hovhannisyan

19 August 2022 4	Alashkert	1–1	Ararat-Armenia	Yerevan
17:00 (UTC+4)	Mensah 52'; Díaz (yellow card) 76'; Gome (yellow card) 83'; Yedigaryan (yellow card) 88'	Report	Alemão 34'; Tera (yellow card) 45+4'; Hovhannisyan (yellow card) 46'	Stadium: Alashkert Stadium; Referee: Artem Gasparyan

26 August 2022 5	BKMA Yerevan	2–4	Alashkert	Yerevan
19:00 (UTC+4)	Shaghoyan 7', 70' (yellow card) 40'; Petrosyan (yellow card) 32'; Aghbalyan (yellow card) 60'; Simonyan (yellow card) 63'; Tarakhchyan (yellow card) 85'	Report	Yedigaryan 33'; T.Voskanyan (yellow card) 41'; Díaz 53', 89'; Galvão 86'	Stadium: FFA Stadium; Referee: Vardan Manukyan

2 September 2022 6	Alashkert	3–0	Shirak	Yerevan
17:00 (UTC+4)	James (yellow card) 16' (yellow-red card) 57'; Gome (yellow card) 25'; Yedigaryan 38' (pen.); Díaz 65', 88'	Report	Traore (yellow card) 9'; Sadoyan (yellow card) 37'; Kodia (yellow card) 57'; Mikaelyan (yellow card) 63'; Vardanyan (yellow card) 67'; Vidić (yellow card) 73'	Stadium: Alashkert Stadium; Referee: Henrik Nalbandian

10 September 2022 7	Urartu	1–1	Alashkert	Yerevan
20:00 (UTC+4)	Khurtsidze 57'	Report	Galvão 16'; Mensah (yellow card) 32'	Stadium: Urartu Stadium; Referee: Zaven Hovhannisyan

16 September 2022 8	Alashkert	0–0	Van	Yerevan
16:00 (UTC+4)	A.Grigoryan (yellow card) 82'	Report	Boniface (yellow card) 83'; Gaba (yellow card) 84'	Stadium: Alashkert Stadium; Referee: Ashot Ghaltakhchyan

1 October 2022 9	Pyunik	5–1	Alashkert	Yerevan
17:00 (UTC+4)	Otubanjo 12'; Miljković (yellow card) 21'; Harutyunyan 40'; Juričić 51'; Yurchenko (yellow card) 73'; Davidyan (yellow card) 74'; González 79', 82'	Report	Čančarević (yellow card) 39'; Díaz 65'; A.Voskanyan (yellow card) 74'	Stadium: Republican Stadium; Referee: Henrik Nalbandian

10 October 2022 10	Alashkert	5–0	Noah	Yerevan
15:00 (UTC+4)	Díaz 9', 58'; Ivanov 11', 45+3' (yellow card) 64'; Yedigaryan (yellow card) 46'; Reyes 65'	Report	Ayrapetyan (yellow card) 68'	Stadium: Alashkert Stadium; Referee: Zaven Hovhannisyan

14 October 2022 11	Ararat Yerevan	0–1	Alashkert	Yerevan
16:00 (UTC+4)	Mkrtchyan (yellow card) 16'; G.Malakyan (yellow card) 45' (red card) 45+3'; Bravo (yellow card) 56'; Ishkhanyan (yellow card) 85'; Darbinyan (yellow card) 90+3'	Report	Galvão 3'; James (yellow card) 42'; Yedigaryan (red card) 45+3'; Metoyan (yellow card) 81'	Stadium: Republican Stadium; Referee: Ashot Ghaltakhchyan

20 October 2022 12	Alashkert	2–1	Lernayin Artsakh	Yerevan
15:00 (UTC+4)	Galvão 20'; Díaz 31'; T.Voskanyan (yellow card) 56'; Čančarević (yellow card) 90+4'	Report	Kostandyan (yellow card) 13'; Mardiyan (yellow card) 69'; Angulo 90'; Harutyunyan (yellow card) 90+2'	Stadium: Alashkert Stadium; Referee: Artem Gasparyan

26 October 2022 13	Ararat-Armenia	4–1	Alashkert	Yerevan
17:00 (UTC+4)	Yenne 29'; Eza 35'; Ambartsumyan 63'; Firmino 81' (yellow card) 90'; Hakobyan (yellow card) 86'	Report	Mensah (yellow card) 51'; Díaz 66'	Stadium: FFA Stadium; Referee: Ashot Ghaltakhchyan

30 October 2022 14	Alashkert	1–0	BKMA Yerevan	Yerevan
15:00 (UTC+4)	Díaz (red card) 31'; Gome (yellow card) 40'; Cuéllar 79'	Report	Samsonyan (yellow card) 17'; Khachumyan (yellow card) 31'; Lulukyan (yellow card) 37'; Avagyan (yellow card) 78'; E.Azizyan (yellow card) 90'	Stadium: Alashkert Stadium; Referee: Sargis Khachatryan

3 November 2022 15	Shirak	0–2	Alashkert	Gyumri
18:00 (UTC+4)	Traore (yellow card) 39'; Gevorkyan (yellow card) 60'; Vardanyan (yellow card) 80'	Report	Reyes 17'; James 31'; A.Grigoryan (yellow card) 74'; Cuéllar (yellow card) 82'; T.Voskanyan (yellow card) 89'	Stadium: Gyumri City Stadium; Referee: Zaven Hovhannisyan

10 November 2022 16	Alashkert	0–0	Urartu	Yerevan
14:00 (UTC+4)	James (yellow card) 11'; Yedigaryan (yellow card) 35'; T.Voskanyan (yellow card) 81'; Reyes (yellow card) 90+4'	Report	Margaryan (yellow card) 40'; Iwu (yellow card) 44'; Antwi (yellow card) 83'; Aghasaryan (yellow card) 89'	Stadium: Alashkert Stadium; Referee: Ashot Ghaltakhchyan

13 November 2022 17	Van	1–0	Alashkert	Charentsavan
14:00 (UTC+4)	N.Hovhannisyan (yellow card) 82'; Ahmed 85'; Gutiérrez (yellow card) 90+2'	Report	Ivanov (yellow card) 79'	Stadium: Charentsavan City Stadium; Referee: Davit Mkrtchyan

22 November 2022 18	Alashkert	1–2	Pyunik	Yerevan
14:00 (UTC+4)	Galvão (yellow card) 73'; Reyes 86'	Report	Juričić (yellow card) 12' (goal) 43'; Bratkov (yellow card) 74'; Kadio 90+3'	Stadium: Alashkert Stadium; Referee: Zaven Hovhannisyan

29 November 2022 19	Noah	3–2	Alashkert	Armavir
14:00 (UTC+4)	Ghevondyan 4'; Igbokwe 7' (yellow card) 71'; Kim (yellow card) 55'; K.Muradyan (yellow card) 76'; Opoku (yellow card) 85'	Report	Galvão 18'; Yedigaryan (yellow card) 46' (goal) 77' (pen.); Gome (yellow card) 48'; Ayvazyan (yellow card) 56'; Ivanov (yellow card) 78'; Čančarević (yellow card) 90+5'	Stadium: Armavir City Stadium; Referee: Vardan Manukyan

4 December 2022 20	Alashkert	0–1	Ararat Yerevan	Yerevan
14:00 (UTC+4)	Hovhannisyan (yellow card) 17'; Reyes (yellow card) 96'; Metoyan (yellow card) 80'; A.Voskanyan (yellow card) 89'	Report	Traoré 16'; Mkrtchyan (yellow card) 52'; Manukyan (yellow card) 90+2'	Stadium: Alashkert Stadium; Referee: Henrik Nalbandian

28 February 2023 21	Lernayin Artsakh	1–3	Alashkert	Vayk
15:00 (UTC+4)	Ojetunde 52'; Palacios (yellow card) 60'; Jnohope (yellow card) 68'; Adamyan (yellow card) 75'; Kharatyan (yellow card) 90+3'; Obonde (yellow card) 90+4'	Report	T.Voskanyan (yellow card) 29' (goal) 63'; Yedigaryan 78'; Agdon 82'	Stadium: Arevik Stadium; Referee: Henrik Nalbandian

5 March 2022 22	Alashkert	0–0	Ararat-Armenia	Yerevan
16:00 (UTC+4)	Racines (yellow card) 44'; Carrillo (yellow card) 90+2'	Report	Nondi (yellow card) 45+4'; Ambartsumyan (yellow card) 90'	Stadium: Alashkert Stadium; Referee: Zaven Hovhannisyan

10 March 2022 23	BKMA Yerevan	1–1	Alashkert	Yerevan
15:00 (UTC+4)	Ustinov 61' (o.g.); Khamoyan (yellow card) 70'; Nersesyan (yellow card) 86'; Grigoryan (yellow card) 90+8'	Report	Galvão (yellow card) 65'; T.Voskanyan (yellow card) 90+1'; Wbeymar (yellow card) 90+5'; Yedigaryan 90+8' (pen.)	Stadium: FFA Stadium; Referee: Sargis Khachatryan

17 March 2023 24	Alashkert	3–0	Shirak	Yerevan
15:00 (UTC+4)	Nenadović 75'; Agdon 87'; A.Grigoryan (yellow card) 87'; Pešić 90'	Report	Tsarukyan (yellow card) 42'; Vidić (yellow card) 55'	Stadium: Alashkert Stadium; Referee: Artem Gasparyan

2 April 2023 25	Urartu	1–0	Alashkert	Yerevan
19:00 (UTC+4)	Melkonyan 37'; Khurtsidze (yellow card) 53'; Aghasaryan (yellow card) 62'; Beglaryan (yellow card) 90+6'	Report	Rudoselsky (yellow card) 39'; Mužek (yellow card) 53'; Ustinov (yellow card) 83'; Čančarević (yellow card) 90+8'	Stadium: Urartu Stadium; Referee: Henrik Nalbandian

9 April 2023 26	Alashkert	3–1	Van	Yerevan
16:00 (UTC+4)	Yedigaryan 9' (pen.) (yellow card) 79'; Ustinov 20' (yellow card) 57'; Rudoselsky (red card) 44'; Kartashyan 68' (o.g.)	Report	Hovsepyan (yellow card) 8'; Asoyan (yellow card) 26' Movsesyan (yellow card) 45+1'; Morello 90+9'	Stadium: Alashkert Stadium; Referee: Ashot Ghaltakhchyan

17 April 2023 27	Pyunik	1–0	Alashkert	Yerevan
19:00 (UTC+4)	Juninho (yellow card) 39'; Villela 62'; Miljković (yellow card) 66'; Davidyan (yellow card) 90+1'	Report	Mužek (yellow card) 25'; Nalbandyan (yellow card) 33'; Galvão (yellow card) 90+5'	Stadium: Republican Stadium; Referee: Henrik Nalbandian

21 April 2023 28	Alashkert	3–0	Noah	Yerevan
16:00 (UTC+4)	Galvão 38'; Miranyan 71'; Ustinov 90+1'	Report	Olawale (yellow card) 34'; Yesayan (yellow card) 80'	Stadium: Alashkert Stadium; Referee: Zaven Hovhannisyan

26 April 2023 29	Ararat Yerevan	2–4	Alashkert	Yerevan
20:00 (UTC+4)	G.Malakyan (yellow card) 27'; Mahmoud 45+1'; Mkoyan (red card) 58'; Mijić (yellow card) 64'; Mézague 71'; Hovhannisyan (yellow card) 76'	Report	Miranyan 14', 43'; Racines 29'; Carrillo (yellow card) 41'; A.Grigoryan (yellow card) 81'; Mensah 85'; Čančarević (yellow card) 88'	Stadium: Republican Stadium; Referee: Vardan Manukyan

1 May 2023 30	Alashkert	1–0	Lernayin Artsakh	Yerevan
16:00 (UTC+4)	Galvão 86' (pen.)	Report	Harutyunyan (yellow card) 65'; Poghosyan (yellow card) 75'; Khachatryan (yellow card) 83' (red card) 83'; Chilingaryan (yellow card) 90+5'	Stadium: Alashkert Stadium; Referee: Ashot Ghaltakhchyan

10 May 2023 31	Ararat-Armenia	0–1	Alashkert	Yerevan
19:00 (UTC+4)	Nondi (yellow card) 26'; Terteryan (yellow card) 32'; Serobyan (yellow card) 34'; Yenne (yellow card) 69'; Tera (yellow card) 73'; Ambartsumyan (yellow card) 86'; Lima (yellow card) 90+6'	Report	Shahinyan (yellow card) 21'; Racines 70'; Čančarević (yellow card) 90+3'	Stadium: FFA Stadium; Referee: Henrik Nalbandian

16 May 2023 32	Alashkert	1–2	BKMA Yerevan	Yerevan
16:00 (UTC+4)	Yedigaryan 30' (pen.); Pešić (yellow card) 84'; Galvão (yellow card) 90+4'	Report	G.Petrosyan 26'; Nalbandyan 40' (o.g.); Tarakhchyan (yellow card) 55'; Nersesyan (yellow card) 67'; Mkrtchyan (yellow card) 82'; Simonyan (yellow card) 90+1'	Stadium: Alashkert Stadium; Referee: Zaven Hovhannisyan

21 May 2023 33	Shirak	0–1	Alashkert	Gyumri
19:00 (UTC+4)	Sadoyan (yellow card) 34'; Vidić (yellow card) 88'	Report	Mužek 10' (yellow card) 90+13'; Ustinov (yellow card) 54'	Stadium: Gyumri City Stadium; Referee: Davit Mkrtchyan

27 May 2023 34	Alashkert	3–2	Urartu	Yerevan
17:00 (UTC+4)	Mužek 6'; Galvão 8'; Yedigaryan 66' (pen.); Agdon (yellow card) 71'; A.Grigoryan (yellow card) 90'	Report	Margaryan (yellow card) 63'; Khurtsidze (yellow card) 67'; Sanogo 74', 90+7'; Tsymbalyuk (yellow card) 79'; Ghazaryan (yellow card) 83'; Carioca (yellow card) 90+8'	Stadium: Alashkert Stadium; Referee: Vardan Manukyan

31 May 2023 35	Van	0–1	Alashkert	Charentsavan
17:00 (UTC+4)	Gorelov (yellow card) 36'	Report	Ivanov (yellow card) 32' (goal) 40'; Miranyan (yellow card) 80'; Mysak (yellow card) 90+6'	Stadium: Charentsavan City Stadium; Referee: Zaven Hovhannisyan

6 June 2023 36	Alashkert	1–2	Pyunik	Yerevan
17:00 (UTC+4)	Yedigaryan 13'; Ustinov (yellow card) 71'; T.Voskanyan (yellow card) 75'; Shahinyan (yellow card) 81'	Report	Otubanjo 36'; Juričić 76' (pen.); Villela (yellow card) 84'	Stadium: Alashkert Stadium; Referee: Yura Mahtesyan

==== Table ====
Pos	Team	Pld	W	D	L	GF	GA	GD	Pts	Qualification or relegation
1	Urartu (C)	36	26	5	5	68	25	+43	83	Qualification for the Champions League first qualifying round
2	Pyunik	36	25	5	6	72	23	+49	80	Qualification for the Europa Conference League first qualifying round (Note: The 2022–23 Armenian Cup winners qualified for the Europa Conference League first qualifying round. Since the cup winners (Urartu) qualified based on league position, the Europa Conference League spot was passed to the fourth-placed team.)
3	Ararat-Armenia	36	23	7	6	70	27	+43	76	Qualification for the Europa Conference League first qualifying round
4	Alashkert	36	20	6	10	58	37	+21	66	Qualification for the Europa Conference League first qualifying round
5	Van	36	11	7	18	38	59	−21	40	
6	Ararat Yerevan	36	10	8	18	29	42	−13	38	
7	Shirak	36	10	6	20	25	55	−30	36	
8	Noah	36	8	8	20	34	66	−32	32 (Note: Games won: Noah 8, BKMA 7.)	
9	BKMA	36	7	11	18	36	53	−17	32	
10	Lernayin Artsakh (R)	36	5	7	24	16	59	−43	22	Relegation to the Armenian First League

Source: FFA Soccerway
Rules for classification: 1) Points; 2) Head-to-head points; 3) Head-to-head goal difference; 4) Head-to-head goals scored; 5) Matches won; 6) Goal difference; 7) Less red cards; 8) Less yellow cards; 9) Fair-play ranking 10) Draw
(C) Champions; (R) Relegated

=== Armenian Cup ===
5 October 2022 First round	West Armenia	1–4	Alashkert	Vagharshapat
15:00 (UTC+4)	Mensah 5' (o.g.); Zakaryan (yellow card) 14' (yellow-red card) 14'; Karapetyan (yellow card) 42'; Mahtesyan (yellow card) 83'	Report	Reyes 40'; Hovhannisyan (yellow card) 41'; Ivanov 42'; Galvão 77'; Díaz 80'	Stadium: Football Academy Stadium; Referee: Vardan Manukyan

25 November 2022 Quarterfinal	Gandzasar Kapan	0–0 (5 – 4 p)	Alashkert	Yerevan
14:00 (UTC+4)	Hambardzumyan (yellow card) 96'; N.Hovhannisyan (yellow card) 99'; Emmanuel (yellow card) 106'	Report		Stadium: Alashkert Stadium; Referee: Artak Vardanyan
	Penalties
	Paremuzyan (penalty scored); Arakelyan (penalty scored); Hambardzumyan (penalty scored); Karapetyan (penalty scored); Emmanuel (penalty scored)		(penalty scored) A.Voskanyan; (penalty scored) Kadio; (penalty scored) Galvão; (penalty missed) Díaz; (penalty scored) Dosa

=== UEFA Europa Conference League ===
==== Qualifying rounds ====
7 July 2022 First qualifying round 1st leg	Alashkert (Armenia)	1–0	(Malta) Ħamrun Spartans	Yerevan, Armenia
19:00 (UTC+4)	Yedigaryan 25'; Hovhannisyan (yellow card) 40'; Fofana (yellow card) 90+1'	Report	Corbalan (yellow card) 13'; Guillaumier (yellow card) 28'; Emerson (yellow card) 31'; Nedeljković (yellow card) 63'	Stadium: Republican Stadium; Attendance: 3,000; Referee: Vassilis Fotias (Greece)
Note: Match played the Republican StadiumStadium, instead of Alashkerts regular stadium, the Alashkert Stadium, which did not meet UEFA requirements.

14 July 2022 First qualifying round 2nd leg	Ħamrun Spartans (Malta)	4–1 (4–2 agg.)	(Armenia) Alashkert	Ta' Qali, Malta
22:00 (UTC+4)	Prša 55'; Guillaumier 63'; Jonny 73'; Dodô 75'; Camenzuli (yellow card) 83'; Eder (yellow card) 89'	Report	Yedigaryan 48'; Hovhannisyan (yellow card) 59'; Hovsepyan (yellow card) 74'; T.Voskanyan (yellow card) 83'	Stadium: Centenary Stadium; Attendance: 1,420; Referee: Miloš Savović (Montenegro)
Note: Match played at the Centenary Stadium in Ta' Qali, instead of Ħamrun Spartans's regular stadium Victor Tedesco Stadium, Ħamrun, which did not meet UEFA requirements.

== Statistics ==
As of match played 6 June 2023

=== Appearances and goals ===
No.	Pos	Nat	Player	Total		Premier League		Armenian Cup		UEFA Europa Conference League	
No.	Pos	Nat	Player	Apps	Goals	Apps	Goals	Apps	Goals	Apps	Goals
2	DF	(Armenia) ARM	Serob Grigoryan	5	0	1+4	0	0	0	0	0
3	DF	(Armenia) ARM	Taron Voskanyan	26	1	23+1	1	0	0	2	0
4	DF	(Ghana) GHA	Annan Mensah	31	3	28+2	3	1	0	0	0
5	MF	(Armenia) ARM	Wbeymar	11	0	8+3	0	0	0	0	0
7	MF	(Armenia) ARM	Karen Nalbandyan	11	0	4+7	0	0	0	0	0
8	MF	(Russia) RUS	Sergei Ivanov	15	4	7+6	3	2	1	0	0
9	MF	(Armenia) ARM	Narek Manukyan	1	0	0+1	0	0	0	0	0
10	FW	(Armenia) ARM	Artur Miranyan	16	3	10+6	3	0	0	0	0
11	MF	(Armenia) ARM	Sargis Shahinyan	34	0	21+10	0	2	0	0+1	0
15	DF	(Armenia) ARM	Arman Khachatryan	1	0	1	0	0	0	0	0
17	MF	(Armenia) ARM	Artak Yedigaryan	36	12	31+2	10	0+1	0	2	2
20	FW	(Brazil) BRA	Thiago Galvão	37	10	25+8	9	0+2	1	2	0
21	MF	(Armenia) ARM	Artak Grigoryan	35	0	28+5	0	0	0	2	0
22	GK	(Serbia) SRB	Ognjen Čančarević	36	0	33	0	1	0	2	0
27	DF	(Venezuela) VEN	Daniel Carrillo	15	0	15	0	0	0	0	0
33	DF	(Russia) RUS	Vitali Ustinov	15	2	15	2	0	0	0	0
70	DF	(Kazakhstan) KAZ	Timur Rudoselsky	10	0	5+5	0	0	0	0	0
71	GK	(Ukraine) UKR	Roman Mysak	3	0	3	0	0	0	0	0
77	DF	(Croatia) CRO	Mateo Mužek	15	2	14+1	2	0	0	0	0
86	FW	(Armenia) ARM	Grigor Nikoghosyan	2	0	0+1	0	0+1	0	0	0
88	MF	(Armenia) ARM	Aram Kocharyan	12	0	7+5	0	0	0	0	0
94	FW	(Serbia) SRB	Uroš Nenadović	12	1	4+8	1	0	0	0	0
95	FW	(Brazil) BRA	Agdon Menezes	12	2	6+6	2	0	0	0	0
98	MF	(Croatia) CRO	Ivan Pešić	11	1	2+9	1	0	0	0	0
99	FW	(Ecuador) ECU	Yeison Racines	12	2	9+3	2	0	0	0	0
Players away on loan:
Players who left Alashkert during the season:
2	DF	(Brazil) BRA	Tiago Cametá	14	0	12	0	0	0	2	0
5	DF	(Ivory Coast) CIV	Didier Kadio	20	0	12+4	0	2	0	2	0
7	MF	(Namibia) NAM	Wangu Gome	15	0	7+7	0	0+1	0	0	0
9	FW	(Armenia) ARM	Aleksandr Karapetyan	5	0	2+1	0	0	0	0+2	0
15	FW	(Ivory Coast) CIV	Béko Fofana	8	0	2+4	0	0	0	0+2	0
19	DF	(Nigeria) NGR	Deou Dosa	7	0	2+3	0	2	0	0	0
27	MF	(Russia) RUS	David Khurtsidze	3	0	1	0	0	0	2	0
27	MF	(Brazil) BRA	Lucas Ventura	7	0	4+3	0	0	0	0	0
33	DF	(Armenia) ARM	Andranik Voskanyan	6	0	3+1	0	2	0	0	0
55	FW	(Armenia) ARM	Sargis Metoyan	17	1	2+11	1	1+1	0	0+2	0
70	MF	(Armenia) ARM	Benik Hovhannisyan	14	0	5+5	0	2	0	2	0
71	GK	(Russia) RUS	Sergei Revyakin	1	0	0	0	1	0	0	0
77	MF	(Armenia) ARM	Rumyan Hovsepyan	15	0	4+7	0	1+1	0	0+2	0
85	FW	(Armenia) ARM	Alexander Ter-Tovmasyan	1	0	0+1	0	0	0	0	0
88	DF	(Brazil) BRA	James	21	1	18	1	0+1	0	2	0
94	FW	(Armenia) ARM	Karapet Manukyan	7	0	3+3	0	0+1	0	0	0
95	FW	(Colombia) COL	Bladimir Díaz	22	12	12+6	11	0+2	1	2	0
96	FW	(El Salvador) ESA	Kevin Reyes	11	4	4+5	3	2	1	0	0
97	MF	(Bolivia) BOL	Ronald Cuéllar	15	2	0+13	2	2	0	0	0
98	DF	(Armenia) ARM	Vahagn Ayvazyan	7	0	2+4	0	1	0	0	0
99	FW	(Colombia) COL	Fáider Burbano	7	0	1+5	0	0	0	0+1	0

=== Goal scorers ===
Place	Position	Nation	Number	Name	Premier League	Armenian Cup	UEFA Europa Conference League	Total
1	FW	(Colombia)	95	Bladimir Díaz	11	1	0	12
1	MF	(Armenia)	17	Artak Yedigaryan	10	0	2	12
3	FW	(Brazil)	20	Thiago Galvão	9	1	0	10
4	FW	(El Salvador)	96	Kevin Reyes	3	1	0	4
4	MF	(Russia)	8	Sergei Ivanov	3	1	0	4
6	DF	(Ghana)	4	Annan Mensah	3	0	0	3
6	FW	(Armenia)	10	Artur Miranyan	3	0	0	3
8	MF	(Bolivia)	97	Ronald Cuéllar	2	0	0	2
8	FW	(Brazil)	95	Agdon Menezes	2	0	0	2
8	DF	(Russia)	33	Vitali Ustinov	2	0	0	2
8	FW	(Ecuador)	99	Yeison Racines	2	0	0	2
8	DF	(Croatia)	77	Mateo Mužek	2	0	0	2
12	FW	(Armenia)	55	Sargis Metoyan	1	0	0	1
12	DF	(Brazil)	88	James	1	0	0	1
12	DF	(Armenia)	3	Taron Voskanyan	1	0	0	1
12	FW	(Serbia)	94	Uroš Nenadović	1	0	0	1
12	MF	(Croatia)	98	Ivan Pešić	1	0	0	1
12				Own goal	1	0	0	1
				TOTALS	58	4	2	64

=== Clean sheets ===
Place	Position	Nation	Number	Name	Premier League	Armenian Cup	UEFA Europa Conference League	Total
1	GK	(Serbia)	22	Ognjen Čančarević	14	1	1	16
2	GK	(Ukraine)	71	Roman Mysak	2	0	0	2
				TOTALS	16	1	1	18

=== Disciplinary record ===
Number	Nation	Position	Name	Premier League		Armenian Cup		UEFA Europa Conference League		Total	
Number	Nation	Position	Name	Booked	Sent off (straight red)	Booked	Sent off (straight red)	Booked	Sent off (straight red)	Booked	Sent off (straight red)
3	(Armenia)	DF	Taron Voskanyan	9	0	0	0	1	0	10	0
4	(Ghana)	MF	Annan Mensah	3	0	0	0	0	0	3	0
5	(Armenia)	MF	Wbeymar	1	0	0	0	0	0	1	0
7	(Armenia)	MF	Karen Nalbandyan	1	0	0	0	0	0	1	0
8	(Russia)	MF	Sergei Ivanov	4	0	0	0	0	0	4	0
10	(Armenia)	FW	Artur Miranyan	1	0	0	0	0	0	1	0
11	(Armenia)	MF	Sargis Shahinyan	2	0	0	0	0	0	2	0
17	(Armenia)	MF	Artak Yedigaryan	5	1	0	0	0	0	5	1
20	(Brazil)	FW	Thiago Galvão	4	0	0	0	0	0	4	0
21	(Armenia)	MF	Artak Grigoryan	5	0	0	0	0	0	5	0
22	(Serbia)	GK	Ognjen Čančarević	6	0	0	0	0	0	6	0
27	(Venezuela)	DF	Daniel Carrillo	2	0	0	0	0	0	2	0
33	(Russia)	DF	Vitali Ustinov	4	0	0	0	0	0	4	0
70	(Kazakhstan)	DF	Timur Rudoselsky	1	1	0	0	0	0	1	1
71	(Ukraine)	GK	Roman Mysak	1	0	0	0	0	0	1	0
77	(Croatia)	DF	Mateo Mužek	3	0	0	0	0	0	3	0
95	(Brazil)	FW	Agdon Menezes	1	0	0	0	0	0	1	0
98	(Croatia)	MF	Ivan Pešić	1	0	0	0	0	0	1	0
99	(Ecuador)	FW	Yeison Racines	1	0	0	0	0	0	1	0
Players away on loan:
Players who left Alashkert during the season:
7	(Namibia)	MF	Wangu Gome	5	0	0	0	0	0	5	0
15	(Ivory Coast)	FW	Béko Fofana	0	0	0	0	1	0	1	0
33	(Armenia)	DF	Andranik Voskanyan	2	0	0	0	0	0	2	0
55	(Armenia)	FW	Sargis Metoyan	2	0	0	0	0	0	2	0
70	(Armenia)	MF	Benik Hovhannisyan	1	0	1	0	2	0	4	0
77	(Armenia)	MF	Rumyan Hovsepyan	1	0	0	0	1	0	2	0
88	(Brazil)	DF	James	4	1	0	0	0	0	4	1
95	(Colombia)	FW	Bladimir Díaz	1	1	0	0	0	0	1	1
96	(El Salvador)	FW	Kevin Reyes	2	0	0	0	0	0	2	0
97	(Bolivia)	MF	Ronald Cuéllar	1	0	0	0	0	0	1	0
98	(Armenia)	DF	Vahagn Ayvazyan	1	0	0	0	0	0	1	0
			TOTALS	74	4	1	0	5	0	80	4
