= List of Armenian football transfers summer 2022 =

This is a list of Armenian football transfers in the summer transfer window, by club. Only clubs of the 2022–23 Armenian Premier League are included.

== Armenian Premier League 2022-23 ==
=== Alashkert ===
In: Note: Flags indicate national team as defined under FIFA eligibility rules; some limited exceptions apply. Players may hold more than one non-FIFA nationality.

No.	Pos.	Nation	Player
4	DF	GHA	Annan Mensah (from (Armenia) Urartu)
8	MF	RUS	Sergei Ivanov (from (Russia) Zenit St.Petersburg)
9	MF	ARM	Narek Manukyan (from (Russia) Kaluga)
11	MF	ARM	Sargis Shahinyan (from Ararat-Armenia)
12	GK	ARM	Arman Meliksetyan (from (Armenia) Van)
20	FW	BRA	Thiago Galvão (from (Armenia) Pyunik)
55	FW	ARM	Sargis Metoyan (from (Romania) Csíkszereda Miercurea Ciuc)
70	MF	ARM	Benik Hovhannisyan (from (Armenia) Van)
77	MF	ARM	Rumyan Hovsepyan (from (Malta) Floriana)
95	FW	COL	Bladimir Díaz (from (El Salvador) FAS)
96	FW	ESA	Kevin Reyes (from (El Salvador) FAS)
97	MF	BOL	Ronald Cuéllar (from (Bolivia) Nacional Potosí)
99	FW	COL	Fáider Burbano (from (El Salvador) Águila)

Out: Note: Flags indicate national team as defined under FIFA eligibility rules; some limited exceptions apply. Players may hold more than one non-FIFA nationality.

No.	Pos.	Nation	Player
4	DF	RUS	Dmitry Guz (to (Russia) Kaluga)
8	DF	ARM	Gagik Daghbashyan (to West Armenia)
9	FW	ARM	Aleksandr Karapetyan (to (Armenia) Pyunik)
10	MF	SRB	Marko Milinković (to (Serbia) Metalac Gornji Milanovac)
11	FW	RUS	Manvel Agaronyan (to (Russia) Luki-Energiya Velikiye Luki)
16	MF	ARM	Albert Mnatsakanyan (to (Russia) Kuban-Holding)
20	MF	ARM	Aghvan Papikyan (to (Poland) Wisła Puławy)
23	MF	RUS	Levon Bayramyan (to (Russia) SKA Rostov-on-Don)
25	GK	RUS	Artyom Potapov (to (Armenia) Ararat Yerevan)
27	MF	RUS	David Khurtsidze (to (Armenia) Urartu)
55	MF	CIV	Kódjo
70	FW	GBS	José Embaló (to (Malaysia) Sabah)
77	MF	KAZ	Alexey Rodionov
85	FW	ARM	Aleksandr Ter-Tovmasyan (to (Luxembourg) Victoria Rosport)
95	MF	BRA	Vitinho (to (Georgia (country)) Telavi)
96	MF	ARM	Erik Soghomonyan (to West Armenia)
97	DF	RUS	Yevgeni Yatchenko
99	FW	RUS	Nikita Tankov (to (Russia) Yadro St.Petersburg)

=== Ararat-Armenia ===
In: Note: Flags indicate national team as defined under FIFA eligibility rules; some limited exceptions apply. Players may hold more than one non-FIFA nationality.

No.	Pos.	Nation	Player
4	DF	ARM	Arman Hovhannisyan (from (Armenia) Pyunik)
7	FW	POR	Hugo Firmino (from (Armenia) Pyunik)
8	MF	ARM	Gevorg Ghazaryan (from (Armenia) Pyunik)
9	FW	BRA	Agdon Menezes (from (Portugal) Varzim)
15	FW	NGR	Tenton Yenne (from (Armenia) Noravank)
22	DF	SRB	Miloš Stamenković (from (Kazakhstan) Akzhayik)
23	DF	ARM	Styopa Mkrtchyan (loan return from (Armenia) BKMA Yerevan)
45	GK	RUS	Vsevolod Yermakov (from (Armenia) Ararat Yerevan)
55	MF	ARM	Hakob Hakobyan (from (Armenia) Urartu)
—	DF	ARM	Ruben Hovsepyan (loan return from (Armenia) Noah)

Out: Note: Flags indicate national team as defined under FIFA eligibility rules; some limited exceptions apply. Players may hold more than one non-FIFA nationality.

No.	Pos.	Nation	Player
7	MF	ARM	Zhirayr Shaghoyan (to (Bulgaria) CSKA Sofia, previously on loan to (Armenia) BKMA Yerevan)
11	DF	UKR	Yehor Klymenchuk (to (Ukraine) Metalist Kharkiv)
12	DF	BEL	Thibaut Lesquoy (to (Netherlands) Willem II)
17	FW	BFA	Zakaria Sanogo (to (Algeria) JS Kabylie)
24	FW	NGR	Yusuf Otubanjo (to (Armenia) Pyunik)
27	MF	NED	Furdjel Narsingh
77	GK	ITA	Valerio Vimercati
79	DF	UKR	Serhiy Vakulenko (to (Armenia) Pyunik)
81	DF	URU	Diego Barboza (to (Spain) Novelda)
—	DF	ARM	Ruben Hovsepyan (on loan to (Armenia) Noah)
—	MF	ARM	Patvakan Avetisyan (on loan to (Armenia) Noah)
—	MF	ARM	Armen Nahapetyan (to (Armenia) Noah, previously on loan to (Armenia) BKMA Yerevan)
—	MF	ARM	Sargis Shahinyan (to (Armenia) Alashkert, previously on loan to (Armenia) Noah)

=== Ararat Yerevan ===
In: Note: Flags indicate national team as defined under FIFA eligibility rules; some limited exceptions apply. Players may hold more than one non-FIFA nationality.

No.	Pos.	Nation	Player
1	GK	ARM	Gor Manukyan (from (Armenia) Lernayin Artsakh)
2	MF	ARM	Serob Galstyan (from (Armenia) BKMA Yerevan)
6	DF	ARM	Hayk Ishkhanyan (from (Armenia) BKMA Yerevan)
8	DF	ARM	Vardan Arzoyan (from (Armenia) Urartu)
10	FW	BIH	Aleksandar Glišić (from (Uzbekistan) Dinamo Samarqand)
19	MF	SUI	Drilon Kastrati (from (Switzerland) Schaffhausen)
22	DF	ARM	Arman Mkrtchyan (from (Armenia) Noravank)
28	GK	RUS	Artyom Potapov (from (Armenia) Alashkert)
55	MF	GAM	Babou Cham (from (Armenia) Noravank)
92	DF	ARM	Gevorg Arabyan (from (Armenia) Shirak)
98	GK	MNE	Nemanja Lemajic (from (Montenegro) Arsenal Tivat)

Out: Note: Flags indicate national team as defined under FIFA eligibility rules; some limited exceptions apply. Players may hold more than one non-FIFA nationality.

No.	Pos.	Nation	Player
1	GK	ARM	Poghos Ayvazyan (to (Armenia) Shirak)
2	DF	ARM	Robert Hakobyan (to (Armenia) Shirak)
22	MF	SRB	Igor Stanojević (to (Serbia) Inđija)
27	MF	ARG	Iván Díaz (to (Greece) GS Ilioupolis)
29	DF	SRB	Marko Prljević (to (Armenia) Shirak)
45	GK	RUS	Vsevolod Yermakov (to Ararat-Armenia)
—	FW	ARM	Grigor Muradyan (to (Armenia) Shirak)

=== BKMA Yerevan ===
In: Note: Flags indicate national team as defined under FIFA eligibility rules; some limited exceptions apply. Players may hold more than one non-FIFA nationality.

No.	Pos.	Nation	Player
2	DF	ARM	Serob Grigoryan (from (Armenia) Pyunik)
6	DF	ARM	Argishti Petrosyan (from (Armenia) Van)
9	FW	ARM	Grenik Petrosyan (from (Armenia) Pyunik, previously on loan)
10	MF	ARM	Zhirayr Shaghoyan (on loan from Ararat-Armenia)
14	MF	ARM	Erik Azizyan (from (Armenia) Pyunik)
16	GK	ARM	Henri Avagyan (from (Armenia) Noravank)
22	MF	ARM	Gevorg Tarakhchyan (from (Armenia) Noah)
23	DF	ARM	Erjanik Ghubasaryan (from (Germany) Lüneburger SK Hansa)
—	MF	ARM	Gor Lulukyan (on loan from (Armenia) Urartu)

Out: Note: Flags indicate national team as defined under FIFA eligibility rules; some limited exceptions apply. Players may hold more than one non-FIFA nationality.

No.	Pos.	Nation	Player
1	GK	ARM	Harutyun Melkonyan (loan return to (Armenia) Pyunik)
5	DF	ARM	Artem Gyurdzhan
6	DF	ARM	Artur Stepanyan (to (Armenia) Van)
9	FW	ARM	Grenik Petrosyan (to (Armenia) Pyunik)
10	MF	ARM	Armen Nahapetyan (loan return to Ararat-Armenia)
10	MF	ARM	Zhirayr Shaghoyan (on return to Ararat-Armenia)
11	FW	ARM	Edgar Movsesyan (loan return to (Armenia) Pyunik)
14	FW	ARM	Martin Grigoryan
21	MF	ARM	Serob Galstyan (to (Armenia) Ararat Yerevan)
23	DF	ARM	Styopa Mkrtchyan (loan return to Ararat-Armenia)
50	MF	ARM	Artur Grigoryan (loan return to (Armenia) Pyunik)
55	DF	ARM	Hayk Ishkhanyan (to (Armenia) Ararat Yerevan)

=== Lernayin Artsakh ===
In: Note: Flags indicate national team as defined under FIFA eligibility rules; some limited exceptions apply. Players may hold more than one non-FIFA nationality.

No.	Pos.	Nation	Player
12	DF	GHA	Michael Peprah (from (Spain) EI San Martín)
16	DF	JPN	Akito Saito
19	FW	URU	Mateo Abeijón
20	DF	GHA	Simon Obonde (from (Ghana) Cheetah)
23	GK	RUS	Vyacheslav Grigoryan (from (Russia) SKA Rostov-on-Don)
28	FW	COL	Daniel Palomera
46	MF	ARM	Ashot Adamyan
99	FW	NGR	Olaoluwa Ojetunde

Out: Note: Flags indicate national team as defined under FIFA eligibility rules; some limited exceptions apply. Players may hold more than one non-FIFA nationality.

No.	Pos.	Nation	Player
16	DF	JPN	Akito Saito
—	GK	ARM	Gor Manukyan (to (Armenia) Ararat Yerevan)
—	DF	ARM	Hamlet Asoyan (to (Armenia) Van)
—	DF	ARM	Perch Poghikyan (to (Armenia) Gandzasar Kapan)
—	MF	ARM	Ashot Kocharyan (to (Armenia) Ararat Yerevan)

=== Noah ===
In: Note: Flags indicate national team as defined under FIFA eligibility rules; some limited exceptions apply. Players may hold more than one non-FIFA nationality.

No.	Pos.	Nation	Player
3	MF	ARM	Karen Muradyan (on loan from (Armenia) Pyunik)
5	DF	ARM	Norayr Nikoghosyan (from (Armenia) Noravank)
7	MF	ARM	Karen Nalbandyan (from (Armenia) Noravank)
9	FW	ARM	Levon Vardanyan (from (Armenia) Pyunik)
10	MF	ARM	Armen Nahapetyan (from Ararat-Armenia)
12	MF	KOR	Yeon-seung Kim (from (Germany) SC St. Tönis 11/20)
13	MF	ARM	Robert Baghramyan (on loan from (Armenia) Urartu)
17	MF	NGR	Adams Friday (from (Russia) Vista Gelendzhik)
20	MF	ARM	Petros Afajanyan (from (Armenia) Shirak)
21	MF	ARM	Patvakan Avetisyan (on loan from Ararat-Armenia)
22	MF	ARM	Ruben Yesayan (on loan from (Armenia) Pyunik)
23	MF	ARM	Hayk Ghevondyan (on loan from (Armenia) Pyunik)
26	DF	ARM	Artur Danielyan (from (Greece) Panserraikos)
27	FW	ARM	Samvel Hakobyan (from (Armenia) Urartu)
32	DF	ARM	Ruben Hovsepyan (on loan from Ararat-Armenia)
33	MF	ARM	Vahagn Hayrapetyan
94	DF	ARM	Arman Khachatryan (from (Armenia) Noravank)
96	GK	ARM	Anatoliy Ayvazov (from (Armenia) Urartu)
97	DF	RUS	Aleksandr Nesterov (from (Russia) Dynamo Stavropol)
99	GK	ARM	Harutyun Melkonyan (on loan from (Armenia) Pyunik)

Out: Note: Flags indicate national team as defined under FIFA eligibility rules; some limited exceptions apply. Players may hold more than one non-FIFA nationality.

No.	Pos.	Nation	Player
3	DF	ARM	Artur Kartashyan (to (Cyprus) Olympiakos Nicosia)
5	DF	BLR	Ilya Udodov (to (Russia) Tver)
7	MF	ARM	Gevorg Tarakhchyan (to (Armenia) BKMA Yerevan)
8	MF	ARM	Sargis Shahinyan (loan return to Ararat-Armenia)
9	FW	RUS	Andrei Titov
10	FW	RUS	Maksim Mayrovich (to (Armenia) Urartu)
11	MF	RUS	Yaroslav Matviyenko
16	MF	MAR	Tarek Afqir (to (Cyprus) AEP Polemidion)
17	DF	ARM	Jordy Monroy (to (Colombia) Independiente Medellín)
19	MF	ARM	Ashot Adamyan (to (Armenia) Lernayin Artsakh)
20	MF	POR	Alex Oliveira (to (Romania) CSM Slatina)
21	FW	RUS	Dmitri Lavrishchev (to (Russia) Kuban-Holding)
22	FW	ARM	Gegham Harutyunyan (to (Armenia) Van)
23	MF	LAT	Aleksejs Grjaznovs (to (Latvia) Liepāja)
27	DF	MDA	Alexei Ciopa (to (Moldova) Zimbru Chișinău)
28	DF	RUS	Grigori Trufanov (to (Russia) Nosta Novotroitsk)
32	MF	MDA	Evgheni Oancea (to (Romania) Concordia Chiajna)
32	DF	ARM	Ruben Hovsepyan (loan return to Ararat-Armenia)
33	DF	ARM	Erik Avetisyan
63	GK	ARM	Gevorg Didaryan
65	FW	GHA	Raymond Gyasi
78	MF	ARM	Yura Karamyan
92	DF	GBS	Saná Gomes (to (Hungary) Debreceni)
94	MF	MDA	Dan Spătaru (to (Moldova) Milsami Orhei)
97	DF	RUS	Albert Gabarayev (to (Russia) Rodina Moscow)
99	GK	RUS	Grigori Matevosyan
—	GK	ARM	Artur Miroyan (to West Armenia)

=== Pyunik ===
In: Note: Flags indicate national team as defined under FIFA eligibility rules; some limited exceptions apply. Players may hold more than one non-FIFA nationality.

No.	Pos.	Nation	Player
2	FW	BIH	Luka Juričić (from (South Korea) Gimpo)
3	DF	SRB	Boris Varga (from (Serbia) TSC Bačka Topola)
8	MF	BRA	Andre Mensalao (from (North Macedonia) Shkëndija)
10	MF	MKD	Stefan Spirovski (from (Hungary) MTK Budapest)
14	FW	NGR	Yusuf Otubanjo (from Ararat-Armenia)
15	DF	RUS	Mikhail Kovalenko (from (Russia) Olimp-Dolgoprudny)
19	FW	ARM	Grenik Petrosyan (from (Armenia) BKMA Yerevan)
20	MF	SRB	Nemanja Mladenović (from (Serbia) Napredak Kruševac)
21	DF	ARM	Arthur Avagyan (from (Armenia) Noravank)
24	FW	MKD	Marjan Radeski (from (North Macedonia) Shkupi)
28	FW	UKR	Robert Hehedosh (from (Poland) Górnik Polkowice)
44	DF	UKR	Alan Aussi (from (Ukraine) Dynamo Kyiv)
77	FW	SEN	Dame Diop (from (Czech Republic) Dynamo České Budějovice)
79	DF	UKR	Serhiy Vakulenko (from Ararat-Armenia)
87	FW	ARM	Aleksandr Karapetyan (from (Armenia) Alashkert)
90	DF	SRB	Aleksandar Miljković (from (Serbia) Partizan)
91	MF	UKR	Roman Karasyuk (from (Ukraine) Rukh Lviv)
97	MF	ARM	David Davidyan (on loan from (Russia) Khimki)
—	MF	IRI	Milad Jahani (on loan from (Iran) Sepahan)

Out: Note: Flags indicate national team as defined under FIFA eligibility rules; some limited exceptions apply. Players may hold more than one non-FIFA nationality.

No.	Pos.	Nation	Player
2	DF	ARM	Serob Grigoryan (to (Armenia) BKMA Yerevan)
3	DF	BRA	Bruno Nascimento
7	FW	POR	Hugo Firmino (to Ararat-Armenia)
8	FW	CIV	Serges Déblé (to (Kazakhstan) Tobol)
10	FW	ARM	Gevorg Ghazaryan (to Ararat-Armenia)
12	GK	ARM	Grigor Meliksetyan
13	MF	KAZ	Gevorg Najaryan (to (Armenia) Van)
17	FW	ARM	Levon Vardanyan (to (Armenia) Noah)
20	FW	BRA	Thiago Galvão (to (Armenia) Alashkert)
21	FW	POR	Carlitos
25	DF	RUS	Magomed Musalov (to (Russia) SKA-Khabarovsk)
90	FW	VEN	José Caraballo
93	MF	BRA	Higor Leite
96	DF	ARM	Arman Hovhannisyan (to Ararat-Armenia)
—	GK	ARM	Harutyun Melkonyan (on loan to (Armenia) Noah)
—	DF	ARM	Vaspurak Minasyan (to (Armenia) Van, previously on loan)
—	MF	ARM	Hayk Ghevondyan (on loan to (Armenia) Noah)
—	MF	ARM	Artur Grigoryan (loan extended at (Armenia) BKMA Yerevan)
—	MF	ARM	Karen Muradyan (on loan to (Armenia) Noah)
—	MF	ARM	Ruben Yesayan (on loan to (Armenia) Noah)
—	MF	ARM	Erik Azizyan (to (Armenia) BKMA Yerevan, previously on to (Armenia) Van)
—	FW	ARM	Edgar Movsesyan (to (Armenia) Van, previously on to (Armenia) BKMA Yerevan)
—	FW	ARM	Grenik Petrosyan (to (Armenia) Van, previously on to (Armenia) BKMA Yerevan)

=== Shirak ===
In: Note: Flags indicate national team as defined under FIFA eligibility rules; some limited exceptions apply. Players may hold more than one non-FIFA nationality.

No.	Pos.	Nation	Player
1	GK	ARM	Poghos Ayvazyan (from (Armenia) Ararat Yerevan)
2	DF	ARM	Robert Hakobyan (from (Armenia) Ararat Yerevan)
14	MF	CIV	Allasane Doumbia
19	MF	CIV	Junior Magico Traore
21	MF	CIV	Donald Kodia
26	DF	SRB	Aleksa Vidić (from (Serbia) Radnički Sremska Mitrovica)
29	DF	SRB	Marko Prljević (from (Armenia) Ararat Yerevan)
59	DF	ARM	Hovhannes Gevorgyan (from (Armenia) BKMA Yerevan)
77	MF	CIV	Moussa Bakayoko (from (Ivory Coast) ASEC Mimosas)

Out: Note: Flags indicate national team as defined under FIFA eligibility rules; some limited exceptions apply. Players may hold more than one non-FIFA nationality.

No.	Pos.	Nation	Player
2	DF	ARM	Gevorg Arabyan (to (Armenia) Ararat Yerevan)
5	DF	ARM	Hakob Vardanyan
8	MF	ARM	Petros Afajanyan (to (Armenia) Noah)
66	FW	ARM	David Ghandilyan (to West Armenia)

=== Urartu ===
In: Note: Flags indicate national team as defined under FIFA eligibility rules; some limited exceptions apply. Players may hold more than one non-FIFA nationality.

No.	Pos.	Nation	Player
5	DF	RUS	Yevgeni Nazarov (from (Czech Republic) Bohemians 1905)
15	FW	RUS	Maksim Mayrovich (from (Armenia) Noah)
21	FW	ARM	Narek Grigoryan (loan return from (Poland) Jagiellonia Białystok)
27	MF	RUS	David Khurtsidze (from (Armenia) Alashkert)
30	DF	BRA	Everson (from (Brazil) Goiás)
33	MF	BRA	Marcos Júnior (from (Brazil) Volta Redonda)
38	FW	BRA	Deividi Buiu (on loan from (Brazil) Noroeste)
41	GK	RUS	Aleksandr Melikhov (on loan from (Russia) Akhmat Grozny)
88	DF	ARM	Zhirayr Margaryan (from (Ukraine) Veres Rivne, previously on loan)
99	FW	RUS	Leon Sabua (from (Russia) Krasnodar)

Out: Note: Flags indicate national team as defined under FIFA eligibility rules; some limited exceptions apply. Players may hold more than one non-FIFA nationality.

No.	Pos.	Nation	Player
4	DF	ARM	Armen Manucharyan
5	MF	ARM	Hakob Hakobyan (to Ararat-Armenia)
5	DF	RUS	Yevgeni Nazarov
7	FW	ARM	Samvel Hakobyan (to (Armenia) Noah)
12	FW	HAI	Jonel Désiré (to (Cyprus) Olympiakos Nicosia)
13	DF	GHA	Annan Mensah (to (Armenia) Alashkert)
14	DF	RUS	Pyotr Ten
18	DF	RWA	Salomon Nirisarike
20	MF	ARM	Gor Lulukyan (on loan to (Armenia) BKMA Yerevan)
22	FW	ARM	Artur Miranyan
28	MF	ARM	Robert Baghramyan (on loan to (Armenia) Noah)
95	DF	ARM	Vardan Arzoyan (to (Armenia) Ararat Yerevan)
96	GK	ARM	Anatoliy Ayvazov (to (Armenia) Noah)

=== Van ===
In: Note: Flags indicate national team as defined under FIFA eligibility rules; some limited exceptions apply. Players may hold more than one non-FIFA nationality.

No.	Pos.	Nation	Player
1	GK	RUS	Samur Agamagomedov (from (Russia) Legion Dynamo Makhachkala)
2	DF	ARM	Vaspurak Minasyan (from (Armenia) Pyunik, previously on loan)
3	DF	ARM	Hamlet Asoyan (from (Armenia) Lernayin Artsakh)
4	DF	UKR	Bohdan Mytsyk (from (Latvia) Ida-Virumaa)
6	DF	RUS	Daur Chanba
7	FW	ARM	Edgar Movsesyan (from (Armenia) Pyunik)
9	FW	NGR	Goodnews Igbokwe (from (Nigeria) Right2Win Sports Academy)
14	MF	NGR	Christopher Boniface (from (Nigeria) Right2Win Sports Academy)
17	MF	NGR	Buhari Sani (from (Nigeria) Right2Win Sports Academy)
19	MF	KAZ	Gevorg Najaryan (from (Armenia) Pyunik)
22	FW	ARM	Gegham Harutyunyan (from (Armenia) Noah)
23	MF	ARM	Pavel Gorelov (on loan from (Russia) Rostov)
30	DF	ARM	Artur Stepanyan (from (Armenia) BKMA Yerevan)
33	MF	RUS	Alan Tatayev
37	DF	NGR	Yahaya Ibrahim (from (Nigeria) Right2Win Sports Academy)
70	DF	RUS	Kirill Antropov (from (Russia) Ufa)
77	DF	SRB	Milan Lalic (from (Serbia) Sloboda Novi Grad)
91	FW	NGR	Ahmed Mubarak Mohammed
99	MF	UKR	Artem Bilyi (from (Ukraine) Metalist Kharkiv)

Out: Note: Flags indicate national team as defined under FIFA eligibility rules; some limited exceptions apply. Players may hold more than one non-FIFA nationality.

No.	Pos.	Nation	Player
5	DF	RUS	Layonel Adams (to (Montenegro) Budućnost Podgorica)
6	DF	ARM	Argishti Petrosyan (to (Armenia) BKMA Yerevan)
7	MF	RUS	Vladimir Filippov (to (Russia) Metallurg Lipetsk)
9	FW	GEO	Kakha Kakhabrishvili (to (Georgia (country)) Locomotive Tbilisi)
10	MF	ARM	Benik Hovhannisyan (to (Armenia) Alashkert)
12	GK	ARM	Arman Meliksetyan (to (Armenia) Alashkert)
17	FW	RSA	Jaisen Clifford
19	DF	RUS	Aleksandr Stepanov (to (Russia) Amkar Perm)
22	GK	ITA	Domenico Coppola
23	DF	RUS	Dmitri Kuzkin
44	MF	KSA	Jaber Issa (to (Saudi Arabia) Al-Jabalain)
70	MF	GEO	Tengiz Tsikaridze
77	MF	ARM	Erik Azizyan (loan return to (Armenia) Pyunik)
90	MF	RUS	Alikhan Malkanduev (to (Russia) Druzhba Maykop)
99	FW	GHA	Benjamin Techie (to (Malta) Lija Athletic)
