= 2022–23 Armenian Cup =

Tournament details
- Country: Armenia
- Teams: 14

Final positions
- Champions: Urartu
- Runners-up: Shirak

Tournament statistics
- Matches played: 13
- Goals scored: 41 (3.15 per match)
- All statistics correct as of 13 May 2023.

The 2022–23 Armenian Cup was the 32nd edition of the football competition in Armenia. The competition began on 4 October 2022 and ended on 13 May, with Urartu lifting their 4th title.

== Teams ==
Round	Clubs remaining	Clubs involved	Winners from previous round	New entries this round	Leagues entering at this round
First Round	12	12	None	12	4 Armenian First League teams 8 Armenian Premier League teams
Quarterfinals	8	8	6	2	2 Armenian Premier League teams
Semifinals	4	4	4	none	none
Final	2	2	2	none	none

== First round ==
On 20 September 2022 the draw for the First Round of the Armenian Cup took place, drawing 4 clubs from the Armenian First League with the 8 lowest ranked clubs from the previous season of the Armenian Premier League together.

4 October 2022	Ararat Yerevan	0–4	Ararat-Armenia	Armavir
15:00 (UTC+4)	Mkoyan (yellow card) 36'	Report	Eza 31', 54', 83'; Mkrtchyan (yellow card) 49'; Agdon 89'	Stadium: Armavir City Stadium; Referee: Davit Mkrtchyan

5 October 2022	Mika	1–2	Gandzasar Kapan	Yerevan
15:00 (UTC+4)	Akada 47' (pen.) (yellow card) 65'	Report	Karapetyan (yellow card) 72' (goal) 80'; Mansour (yellow card) 75'; Paremuzyan 90+1'	Stadium: IDPHPA M/Field; Referee: Hovhannes Kalantaryan

5 October 2022	West Armenia	1–4	Alashkert	Vagharshapat
15:00 (UTC+4)	Mensah 5' (o.g.); Zakaryan (yellow card) 14' (yellow-red card) 14'; Karapetyan (yellow card) 42'; Mahtesyan (yellow card) 83'	Report	Reyes 40'; Hovhannisyan (yellow card) 41'; Ivanov 42'; Galvão 77'; Díaz 80'	Stadium: Football Academy Stadium; Referee: Vardan Manukyan

5 October 2022	Syunik	1–5	Shirak	Kapan
15:00 (UTC+4)	Stepanyan 49'	Report	Bakayoko 5', 52'; Mryan 36'; Doumbia 68' (pen.); Misakyan (yellow card) 82'; Gevorkyan 85' (pen.)	Stadium: Gandzasar Stadium; Referee: Sargis Khachatryan

6 October 2022	Lernayin Artsakh	1–3	Van	Vayk
15:00 (UTC+4)	Asryan (yellow card) 36'; Ojetunde 81'	Report	Ahmed 14'; Bilyi (yellow card) 34'; Mytsyk 37' (yellow card) 88'; Sani 86'	Stadium: Arevik Stadium; Referee: Zaven Hovhannisyan

6 October 2022	BKMA Yerevan	0–1	Noah	Yerevan
16:00 (UTC+4)	Grigoryan (red card) 13'; Khachumyan (yellow card) 46'; Samson (yellow card) 75'; Petrosyan (yellow card) 90+1'	Report	Salou 10' (pen.); Vardanyan (yellow card) 10'; Ebenezer (yellow card) 46'; Nikoghosyan (yellow card) 58'	Stadium: Yerevan Football Academy Stadium; Referee: Yura Mahtesyan

== Quarterfinals ==
On 19 October, the draw for the Quarterfinal of the cup took place.

24 November 2022	Shirak	2–0	Van	Gyumri
18:00 (UTC+4)	Vardanyan (yellow card) 37'; Doumbia 45+1'; Sadoyan (yellow card) 90+1'; Gevorkyan 90+6'	Report	Asoyan (yellow card) 47'; Harutyunyan (yellow card) 86'; N.Hovhannisyan (red card) 90+5'	Stadium: Gyumri City Stadium; Referee: Artem Gasparyan

25 November 2022	Gandzasar Kapan	0–0 (5 – 4 p)	Alashkert	Yerevan
14:00 (UTC+4)	Hambardzumyan (yellow card) 96'; N.Hovhannisyan (yellow card) 99'; Emmanuel (yellow card) 106'	Report		Stadium: Alashkert Stadium; Referee: Artak Vardanyan
	Penalties
	Paremuzyan (penalty scored); Arakelyan (penalty scored); Hambardzumyan (penalty scored); Karapetyan (penalty scored); Emmanuel (penalty scored)		(penalty scored) A.Voskanyan; (penalty scored) Kadio; (penalty scored) Galvão; (penalty missed) Díaz; (penalty scored) Dosa

26 November 2022	Ararat-Armenia	0–4	Urartu	Yerevan
17:00 (UTC+4)	Lima (yellow card) 82'; Alemão (yellow card) 90+5'	Report	Mayrovich 10'; Beglaryan (yellow card) 74'; Khurtsidze 75'; Aghasaryan (yellow card) 77'; Khlyobas 87'; N.Grigoryan 89'	Stadium: FFA Stadium; Referee: Zaven Hovhannisyan

26 November 2022	Pyunik	3–0	Noah	Yerevan
19:00 (UTC+4)	Otubanjo 17'; Gareginyan (yellow card) 70'; Ristevski (yellow card) 88'; Juričić 89', 90+4'; Buchnev (yellow card) 90+1'	Report	Friday (yellow card) 30'; Salou (yellow card) 71'; Igbokwe (yellow card) 76'; Danielyan (yellow card) 79'	Stadium: Republican Stadium; Referee: Sargis Khachatryan

== Semi–finals ==
On 30 November, the draw for the Semi–final of the cup took place.

5 April 2023	Shirak	1–1 (a.e.t.) (5–3 p)	Pyunik	Gyumri
19:00 (UTC+4)	Kodia 17'; Darbinyan (yellow card) 33'; Mryan (yellow card) 54'; Achinov (yellow card) 80'; Vidić (yellow card) 96'	Report	Miljković (yellow card) 77'; Harutyunyan (yellow card) 79'; Baranov (yellow card) 90'; Juninho 90+11'	Stadium: Gyumri City Stadium; Referee: Henrik Nalbandian
	Penalties
	Vardanyan (penalty scored); Prljević (penalty scored); Bakayoko (penalty scored); Traore (penalty scored); Darbinyan (penalty scored)		(penalty missed) Gareginyan; (penalty scored) Malakyan; (penalty scored) Désiré; (penalty scored) Dashyan

6 April 2023	Urartu	4–0	Gandzasar Kapan	Yerevan
19:00 (UTC+4)	Melkonyan (yellow card) 58'; Margaryan 67'; Dzhikiya 70'; Özbiliz 87' (pen.), 90+1'; Marcos Júnior (yellow card) 89'	Report	Faye (yellow card) 32'; Paremuzyan (yellow card) 37'; Emmanuel (yellow card) 65'; Hovhannisyan (yellow card) 72'; Arakelyan (yellow card) 90+3' (yellow-red card) 90+3'	Stadium: Urartu Stadium; Referee: Yura Mahtesyan

== Final ==
13 May 2023	Shirak	1–2	Urartu	Yerevan
19:00 (UTC+4)	Bakayoko 6' (yellow card) 65' (yellow-red card) 72'; Mryan (yellow card) 18'	Report	Khurtsidze 1'; Melkonyan 85'	Stadium: Republican Stadium; Referee: Andris Treimanis

== Scorers ==
As of match played 13 May 2023

3 goals:

- (Ivory Coast) Wilfried Eza - Ararat-Armenia
- (Ivory Coast) Moussa Bakayoko - Shirak

2 goals:

- (Bosnia and Herzegovina) Luka Juričić - Pyunik
- (Ivory Coast) Allasane Doumbia - Shirak
- (Russia) Artyom Gevorkyan - Shirak
- (Armenia) Aras Özbiliz - Urartu
- (Russia) David Khurtsidze - Urartu

1 goals:

- (Brazil) Thiago Galvão - Alashkert
- (Colombia) Bladimir Díaz - Alashkert
- (Russia) Sergei Ivanov - Alashkert
- (El Salvador) Kevin Reyes - Alashkert
- (Brazil) Agdon Menezes - Ararat-Armenia
- (Armenia) Alen Karapetyan - Gandzasar Kapan
- (Armenia) David Paremuzyan - Gandzasar Kapan
- (Nigeria) Olaoluwa Ojetunde - Lernayin Artsakh
- (Japan) Noriki Akada - Mika
- (Burkina Faso) Dramane Salou - Noah
- (Brazil) Juninho - Pyunik
- (Nigeria) Yusuf Otubanjo - Pyunik
- (Armenia) Lyova Mryan - Shirak
- (Ivory Coast) Donald Kodia - Shirak
- (Armenia) Alen Stepanyan - Syunik
- (Armenia) Narek Grigoryan - Urartu
- (Armenia) Zhirayr Margaryan - Urartu
- (Armenia) Karen Melkonyan - Urartu
- (Russia) Temur Dzhikiya - Urartu
- (Russia) Maksim Mayrovich - Urartu
- (Ukraine) Dmytro Khlyobas - Urartu
- (Nigeria) Mubarak Ahmed - Van
- (Nigeria) Sani Buhari - Van
- (Ukraine) Bohdan Mytsyk - Van

Own goals:

- (Ghana) Annan Mensah - Alashkert vs West Armenia 5 October 2022

== See also ==
- 2022–23 Armenian Premier League
- 2022–23 Armenian First League
