= Ramon Erdei =

Romanian footballer (born 2008)

Personal information
- Full name: Ramon Elias Erdei
- Date of birth: 3 July 2008 (age 18)
- Place of birth: Satu Mare, Romania
- Height: 1.79 m (5 ft 10 in)
- Position: Midfielder

Team information
- Current team: FK Csíkszereda
- Number: 96

Youth career
- Il Calcio Satu Mare
- –2023: LPS Satu Mare
- 2023–: FK Csíkszereda

Senior career*
Years	Team	Apps	(Gls)
2025–	FK Csíkszereda	3	(0)

International career^{‡}
2023	Romania U15	7	(0)
- * Club domestic league appearances and goals as of 20 January 2026 ‡ National team caps and goals as of 20 January 2026

Ramon Elias Erdei (born 3 July 2008) is a Romanian professional footballer who plays as a midfielder for Liga I club FK Csíkszereda.
