= FC Șoimii Gura Humorului =

Romanian football club

Șoimii Gura Humorului
- Full name: Fotbal Club Șoimii Gura Humorului
- Nicknames: Șoimii din Bucovina (The Hawks of Bukovina); Alb-roșii (The White and Reds)
- Short name: Șoimii
- Founded: 2023; 3 years ago
- Ground: Areni
- Capacity: 12,500
- Owner: Gura Humorului Town
- League: Liga IV
- 2025–26: Liga III, Series I Regular season: 1st of 12; Play-off, Series I: 2nd
- Website: soimiigurahumorului.com

Fotbal Club Șoimii Gura Humorului, commonly known as Șoimii Gura Humorului, is a Romanian football club based in Gura Humorului, Suceava County. Founded in 2023, the club currently competes in Liga III, the third tier of Romanian football, following promotion in 2024.

== History ==
Șoimii Gura Humorului was founded in 2023 at the initiative of a group of sports enthusiasts and local businessman Eduard Wendling, with the aim of reviving local football traditions following the disappearance of CS Gura Humorului in 2018.

The club was enrolled in Liga IV Suceava County for the 2023–24 season, playing its home matches at Tineretului Stadium in Gura Humorului under the guidance of head coach Mihai Obreja. Șoimii won the county championship and qualified for the promotion play-off to Liga III, where it defeated Comstar Vaslui, the winners of Liga IV Vaslui County, 8–2 on aggregate (5–0 at home and 3–2 away), securing promotion to the third tier.

In its first Liga III campaign, Șoimii competed in Series I, playing its first third-tier home matches at Constantin Jamaischi Stadium in Fălticeni due to the poor condition of the stadium in Gura Humorului before returning to Tineretului Stadium later in the season, under head coach Mihai Eremia, and finished 8th in the regular season, later ending the campaign in 7th place in the play-out round.

In the summer of 2025, Valentin Suciu was appointed head coach, followed by a transfer campaign that brought in players with experience in the Romanian first league, such as Golofca, Ștefănescu and Fülöp. The club also moved its home matches to Areni Stadium in Suceava. Șoimii reached the play-off round of Cupa României, where it was defeated 0–2 by Sepsi OSK. The winter break saw the club further strengthen its squad by bringing in new players such as Buhăcianu, Finica, Longher and Csiszér. The team subsequently finished 1st in the regular season of Series I. Suciu was dismissed in late April, and the team was led by his assistants, Sebastian Vicol and Vasile Prisacă, finishing 2nd after a close fight with local rivals and series winners Cetatea Suceava, qualifying for the promotion play-offs to Liga II.

== Grounds ==
Initially, Șoimii played its home matches at Tineretului Stadium in Gura Humorului, with a capacity of 1,000. Due to inadequate conditions, the club moved its first Liga III home matches to Constantin Jamaischi Stadium in Fălticeni, which has a capacity of 4,000, before returning to Tineretului Stadium later in the season. From 2026, Șoimii relocated its home matches to Areni Stadium in Suceava, with a capacity of 12,000, which it shares with Cetatea Suceava.

== Honours ==
Liga III

- Runners-up (1): 2025–26

Liga IV – Suceava County

- Winners (1): 2023–24

== Former managers ==
- (Romania) Mihai Obreja (2023–2024)
- (Romania) Mihai Eremia (2024–2025)
- (Romania) Valentin Suciu (2025–2026)
- (Romania) Sebastian Vicol (interim) (2026–present)

== League and cup history ==
Season	Tier	League	Place	Notes	Cupa României
2025–26	3	Liga III (Series I)	2nd (play-off)		Play-off round
2024–25	3	Liga III (Series I)	7th		
2023–24	4	Liga IV (SV)	1st (C)	Promoted	
