= Botond Szondi =

Romanian footballer (born 2002)

Personal information
- Date of birth: 26 June 2002 (age 24)
- Place of birth: Miercurea Ciuc, Romania
- Height: 1.76 m (5 ft 9 in)
- Position: Defensive midfielder

Team information
- Current team: FK Csíkszereda
- Number: 53

Youth career
- 2013–2021: FK Csíkszereda

Senior career*
Years	Team	Apps	(Gls)
2020–	FK Csíkszereda	38	(2)

International career^{‡}
2018	Romania U16	2	(0)
2018–2019	Romania U17	9	(0)
2019–2020	Romania U18	5	(0)
2021–2022	Romania U20	1	(0)
- * Club domestic league appearances and goals as of 20 January 2026 ‡ National team caps and goals as of 20 January 2026

Botond Szondi (born 26 June 2002) is a Romanian professional footballer who plays as a defensive midfielder for Liga I club FK Csíkszereda.
