= Dušan Vuković (footballer, born 2003) =

Montenegrin footballer (born 2003)

Personal information
- Date of birth: 27 July 2003 (age 23)
- Place of birth: Berane, Serbia and Montenegro
- Height: 1.85 m (6 ft 1 in)
- Positions: Attacking midfielder; left winger

Team information
- Current team: FK Csíkszereda
- Number: 7

Youth career
- –2019: Berane
- 2019–2020: Podgorica

Senior career*
Years	Team	Apps	(Gls)
2021–2023	Podgorica	52	(8)
2021–2026	Mladost DG	60	(12)
2024–2025	→ Hebar Pazardzhik	25	(3)
2026–	FK Csíkszereda	5	(0)

International career
2021	Montenegro U19	3	(0)
2021	Montenegro U20	1	(0)
2023–2024	Montenegro U21	3	(0)
- * Club domestic league appearances and goals as of 7 November 2026

Dušan Vuković (Montenegrin: Душан Вуковић; born 27 July 2003) is a Montenegrin professional footballer who plays as an attacking midfielder or a left winger for Liga I club FK Csíkszereda.

== Honours ==
Mladost DG

- Montenegrin Third League: 2020–21
