= Luca Noveli =

Romanian footballer (born 2008)

Personal information
- Full name: Luca Antonio Noveli
- Date of birth: 7 February 2008 (age 18)
- Place of birth: Satu Mare, Romania
- Height: 1.78 m (5 ft 10 in)
- Position: Forward

Team information
- Current team: FK Csíkszereda/CSA Steaua București
- Number: 14/

Youth career
- Il Calcio Satu Mare
- –2024: LPS Satu Mare
- 2024–: FK Csíkszereda

Senior career*
Years	Team	Apps	(Gls)
2025–	FK Csíkszereda	6	(0)
2026–	CSA Steaua București	0	(0)
- * Club domestic league appearances and goals as of 7 November 2026

Luca Antonio Noveli (born 12 February 2008) is a Romanian professional footballer who plays as a forward for Liga I club FK Csíkszereda and for Liga II club CSA Steaua București.
