= Szilárd Gyenge =

Romanian professional footballer

Personal information
- Date of birth: 11 February 2001 (age 25)
- Place of birth: Miercurea Ciuc, Romania
- Height: 1.89 m (6 ft 2 in)
- Position: Goalkeeper

Team information
- Current team: Sepsi OSK
- Number: 33

Youth career
- –2018: FK Csíkszereda

Senior career*
Years	Team	Apps	(Gls)
2018–2024	FK Csíkszereda	91	(0)
2024–	Sepsi OSK	12	(0)

International career
2019	Romania U19	1	(0)
2021–2022	Romania U21	2	(0)
- * Club domestic league appearances and goals as of 17 October 2026

Szilárd Gyenge (born 11 February 2001) is a Romanian professional footballer who plays as a goalkeeper for Liga I club Sepsi OSK.

== Honours ==
FK Csíkszereda

- Liga III: 2018–19
