= Lóránd Fülöp =

Romanian footballer

Personal information
- Full name: Lóránd Levente Fülöp
- Date of birth: 24 July 1997 (age 29)
- Place of birth: Târgu Mureș, Romania
- Height: 1.80 m (5 ft 11 in)
- Positions: Attacking midfielder; forward

Team information
- Current team: Cetatea Suceava
- Number: 80

Youth career
- –2012: ACS Kinder Târgu Mureș
- 2012–2015: Ardealul Cluj
- 2015–2016: Sepsi OSK

Senior career*
| Years | Team | Apps | (Gls) |
| 2016–2019 | Botoșani | 52 | (15) |
| 2019–2021 | Puskás Akadémia | 1 | (0) |
| 2020–2021 | → Sepsi OSK (loan) | 35 | (5) |
| 2021–2022 | Voluntari | 41 | (1) |
| 2022–2023 | Universitatea Cluj | 20 | (2) |
| 2023–2025 | Botoșani | 22 | (1) |
| 2025 | FK Csíkszereda | 12 | (0) |
| 2025–2026 | Șoimii Gura Humorului | 17 | (14) |
| 2026– | Cetatea Suceava | 11 | (4) |

International career
| 2018 | Székely Land | | |
- * Club domestic league appearances and goals as of 31 October 2026

Lóránd Levente Fülöp (born 24 July 1997) is a Romanian professional footballer who plays as a midfielder for Liga II club Cetatea Suceava.

== International career ==
Fülöp was a member of the Székely Land squad that finished 4th at the 2018 ConIFA World Football Cup.

== Personal life ==
He is of Hungarian ethnicity. His brother, István, is also a footballer.

== Career statistics ==
=== Club ===
As of match played 31 October 2026

Appearances and goals by club, season and competition
| Club | Season | League | | | National cup (Note: Includes Cupa României, Magyar Kupa) | | League cup (Note: Includes Cupa Ligii) | | Europe | | Other | | Total | |
| Club | Season | Division | Apps | Goals | Apps | Goals | Apps | Goals | Apps | Goals | Apps | Goals | Apps | Goals |
|---|---|---|---|---|---|---|---|---|---|---|---|---|---|---|
| Botoșani | 2016–17 | Liga I | 16 | 3 | 1 | 0 | 1 | 1 | — | | — | | 18 | 4 |
| Botoșani | 2017–18 | Liga I | 11 | 4 | 0 | 0 | — | | — | | — | | 11 | 4 |
| Botoșani | 2018–19 | Liga I | 25 | 8 | 0 | 0 | — | | — | | — | | 25 | 8 |
| Botoșani | Total | | 52 | 15 | 1 | 0 | 1 | 1 | 0 | 0 | 0 | 0 | 54 | 16 |
| Puskás Akadémia | 2019–20 | NB I | 1 | 0 | 3 | 1 | — | | — | | — | | 4 | 1 |
| Sepsi OSK (loan) | 2019–20 | Liga I | 11 | 3 | 3 | 1 | — | | — | | — | | 14 | 4 |
| Sepsi OSK (loan) | 2020–21 | Liga I | 24 | 2 | 1 | 0 | — | | — | | — | | 14 | 1 |
| Sepsi OSK (loan) | Total | | 35 | 5 | 4 | 1 | 0 | 0 | 0 | 0 | 0 | 0 | 39 | 6 |
| Voluntari | 2021–22 | Liga I | 36 | 1 | 5 | 0 | — | | — | | — | | 41 | 1 |
| Voluntari | 2022–23 | Liga I | 5 | 0 | — | | — | | — | | — | | 5 | 0 |
| Voluntari | Total | | 41 | 1 | 5 | 0 | 0 | 0 | 0 | 0 | 0 | 0 | 46 | 1 |
| Universitatea Cluj | 2022–23 | Liga I | 20 | 2 | 4 | 1 | — | | — | | — | | 24 | 3 |
| Botoșani | 2023–24 | Liga I | 7 | 0 | — | | — | | — | | 1 (Note: All appearances in Liga I promotion/relegation play-offs) | 0 | 8 | 0 |
| Botoșani | 2024–25 | Liga I | 15 | 1 | 2 | 0 | — | | — | | — | | 17 | 1 |
| Botoșani | Total | | 22 | 1 | 2 | 0 | 0 | 0 | 0 | 0 | 1 | 0 | 25 | 1 |
| FK Csíkszereda | 2024–25 | Liga II | 12 | 0 | — | | — | | — | | — | | 12 | 0 |
| Șoimii Gura Humorului | 2025–26 | Liga III | 17 | 14 | 3 | 0 | — | | — | | 1 (Note: Appearance in Liga III promotion play-offs) | 1 | 20 | 14 |
| Cetatea Suceava | 2026–27 | Liga II | 11 | 4 | 0 | 0 | — | | — | | — | | 11 | 4 |
| Career total | | | 211 | 42 | 22 | 3 | 1 | 1 | 0 | 0 | 2 | 1 | 236 | 47 |

== Honours ==
Sepsi OSK

- Cupa României runner-up: 2019–20

Voluntari

- Cupa României runner-up: 2021–22

Universitatea Cluj

- Cupa României runner-up: 2022–23
