= Valentin Suciu =

Romanian professional football manager (born 1980)

Personal information
- Full name: Valentin Dumitru Suciu
- Date of birth: 25 September 1980 (age 46)
- Place of birth: Sfântu Gheorghe, Romania

Team information
- Current team: FK Csíkszereda (head coach)

Managerial career
- Years: Team
- 2012–2013: Zagon
- 2013–2017: Sepsi OSK
- 2018: FK Csíkszereda U17
- 2018–2022: FK Csíkszereda
- 2022–2025: Sepsi OSK (youth center director)
- 2024–2025: Sepsi OSK
- 2025–2026: Șoimii Gura Humorului
- 2026–: FK Csíkszereda

Valentin Dumitru Suciu (born 25 September 1980) is a Romanian professional football manager, currently in charge of Liga I club FK Csíkszereda.

== Managerial statistics ==
As of 7 November 2026

Team	From	To	Record							
Team	From	To	G	W	D	L	GF	GA	GD	Win %
(Romania) Zagon	1 July 2012	30 June 2013	24	10	8	6	38	35	+3	41.67
(Romania) Sepsi OSK	1 July 2013	25 October 2017	134	91	19	24	329	101	+228	67.91
(Romania) FK Csíkszereda	1 July 2018	14 March 2022	115	56	26	33	182	115	+67	48.70
(Romania) Sepsi OSK	10 September 2024	17 March 2025	26	9	7	10	33	29	+4	34.62
(Romania) Șoimii Gura Humorului	22 August 2025	27 April 2026	27	19	4	4	66	17	+49	70.37
(Romania) FK Csíkszereda	24 September 2026	present	6	1	2	3	4	7	−3	16.67
Total			332	186	66	80	652	304	+348	56.02

== Honours ==
=== Coach ===
Sepsi OSK

- Liga III: 2015–16
- Liga IV – Covasna County: 2013–14

FK Csíkszereda

- Liga III: 2018–19
