= Erwin Bloj =

Romanian professional footballer

Personal information
- Full name: Erwin Szilárd Bloj
- Date of birth: 24 July 1997 (age 29)
- Place of birth: Deva, Romania
- Height: 1.79 m (5 ft 10 in)
- Positions: Right-back; midfielder

Team information
- Current team: CSM Reșița
- Number: 17

Youth career
- –2009: Mureșul Deva
- 2009–2016: FC Hunedoara

Senior career*
| Years | Team | Apps | (Gls) |
| 2016–2021 | CS Hunedoara | | |
| 2021–2023 | CSM Deva | | |
| 2023–2026 | FK Csíkszereda | 53 | (2) |
| 2026– | CSM Reșița | 11 | (0) |
- * Club domestic league appearances and goals as of 1 November 2026

Erwin Szilárd Bloj (born 24 July 1997) is a Romanian professional footballer who plays as a right-back or a midfielder for Liga II club CSM Reșița.

== Club career ==
Bloj made his Liga I debut for FK Csíkszereda in a 2–2 home draw against Dinamo București, on 14 July 2025. Bloj left FK Csíkszereda in June 2026.

== Personal life ==
Born in Romania, Bloj is of Hungarian ethnicity.

== Honours ==
CS Hunedoara

- Liga III: 2021–22
- Liga IV – Hunedoara County: 2017–18

CSM Deva

- Liga III: 2022–23
