= Football Academy of Székely Land =

The Football Academy of Székely Land (Hungarian: Székelyföldi Labdarúgó Akadémia; Romanian: Academia de Fotbal a Ținutului Secuiesc) is an association football academy that operates in several towns across Székely Land, Romania.

The idea of the creation of a football academy first came up in 2011 and eventually realized on 26 September 2013, when FK Csíkszereda signed a cooperational agreement with Hungarian top division club Puskás Akadémia FC, that runs an elite football academy in Hungary and gives the professional support to this new academy. On the same occasion a new artificial grass football field was handed over in Miercurea Ciuc to broaden and improve the academy's infrastructural background.

The academy's headquarters and main training center is in Miercurea Ciuc with subdivisions in Odorheiu Secuiesc, Gheorgheni, Sfântu Gheorghe and Baraolt, giving daily training for about 700 youngsters at the age between 7 and 13. The most talented of them are encouraged to join the Miercurea Ciuc training center from the 9th grade, offering them the future opportunity to play either for FK Csíkszereda or Puskás Akadémia FC.

The academy is financed by the local government of Miercurea Ciuc and the Hungarian state; in 2014 they received €330,000 through the Gábor Bethlen Fund, of which main task is to support the individual and collective prosperity of the Hungarians living abroad, and to preserve their cultural, material and intellectual values.

== See also ==
- Székely Land national football team
