= Ervin Bakoș =

Romanian professional footballer

Personal information
- Full name: Ervin Raul Bakoș
- Date of birth: 27 May 2004 (age 22)
- Place of birth: Timișoara, Romania
- Height: 1.82 m (6 ft 0 in)
- Position: Attacking midfielder

Team information
- Current team: FK Csíkszereda
- Number: 15

Youth career
- 2009–2020: LPS Banatul Timișoara
- 2020–2021: ASU Politehnica Timișoara

Senior career*
Years	Team	Apps	(Gls)
2021–2023	ASU Politehnica Timișoara	8	(0)
2023	→ FK Csíkszereda (loan)	0	(0)
2023–	FK Csíkszereda	54	(9)
2023	→ Odorheiu Secuiesc (loan)		
- * Club domestic league appearances and goals as of 22 December 2025

Ervin Raul Bakoș (born 27 May 2004) is a Romanian professional footballer who plays as an attacking midfielder for Liga I club FK Csíkszereda.

== Club career ==
Bakoș made his Liga I debut for FK Csíkszereda on 17 August 2025 against Universitatea Craiova, and he scored his first Liga I goal on 23 August 2025 against Botoșani.

== Personal life ==
Born in Romania, Bakoș is of Hungarian descent.

== Career statistics ==
=== Club ===
As of match played 22 December 2025

Appearances and goals by club, season and competition
Club	Season	League			Cupa României		Other		Total	
Club	Season	Division	Apps	Goals	Apps	Goals	Apps	Goals	Apps	Goals
ASU Politehnica Timișoara	2021–22	Liga II	3	0	0	0	—		3	0
ASU Politehnica Timișoara	2022–23	Liga II	6	0	0	0	—		6	0
ASU Politehnica Timișoara	Total		9	0	0	0	—		9	0
FK Csíkszereda (loan)	2022–23	Liga II	0	0	—		—		0	0
FK Csíkszereda	2023–24	Liga II	19	3	0	0	1 (Note: Appearances in Liga I promotion/relegation play-offs)	0	20	3
FK Csíkszereda	2024–25	Liga II	25	5	2	0	—		27	5
FK Csíkszereda	2025–26	Liga I	10	1	2	0	—		12	1
FK Csíkszereda	2025–26	Liga I	0	0	0	0	—		0	0
FK Csíkszereda	Total		54	9	4	0	1	0	59	9
Odorheiu Secuiesc (loan)	2023–24	Liga III	?	?	—		—		?	?
Career total			63	9	4	0	1	0	68	9
