= Attila Csürös =

Romanian professional footballer

Personal information
- Date of birth: 15 February 1995 (age 31)
- Place of birth: Miercurea Ciuc, Romania
- Height: 1.79 m (5 ft 10 in)
- Positions: Defensive midfielder; centre-back

Team information
- Current team: FK Csíkszereda
- Number: 13

Youth career
- –2014: FK Csíkszereda

Senior career*
Years	Team	Apps	(Gls)
2014–	FK Csíkszereda	149	(7)
- * Club domestic league appearances and goals as of 7 November 2026

Attila Csürös (born 15 August 1995) is a Romanian professional footballer who plays as a defensive midfielder or as a centre-back for Liga I club FK Csíkszereda, which he captains.

== Club career ==
Csürös is the youth product of his hometown club FK Csíkszereda. He joined the senior squad in 2014, before the Liga IV promotion play-off win against Zărnești. He spent his entire playing career at FK Csíkszereda promoting with the club to the Liga II in 2019 and to the Liga I in 2025.

== Personal life ==
Born in Miercurea Ciuc, Romania, Csürös is of Hungarian ethnicity.

== Honours ==
FK Csíkszereda

- Liga III: 2018–19
- Liga IV – Harghita County: 2013–14
