= Lima (footballer, born 2005) =

Brazilian footballer (born 2005)

Personal information
- Full name: Gabriel Araújo Lima
- Date of birth: 18 January 2005 (age 21)
- Place of birth: Braga, Portugal
- Height: 1.80 m (5 ft 11 in)
- Positions: Winger; attacking midfielder

Team information
- Current team: FK Csíkszereda
- Number: 20

Youth career
- –2025: Athletico Paranaense

Senior career*
Years	Team	Apps	(Gls)
2026	Atlético Goianiense	8	(0)
2026–	FK Csíkszereda	7	(0)
- * Club domestic league appearances and goals as of 7 November 2026

Gabriel Araújo Lima (born 18 January 2005), better known as Lima, is a Brazilian professional footballer who plays as a winger or an attacking midfielderfor Liga I club FK Csíkszereda.

== Personal life ==
Gabriel's father, Nem, was also footballer.
