= Mateo Mužek =

Croatian footballer

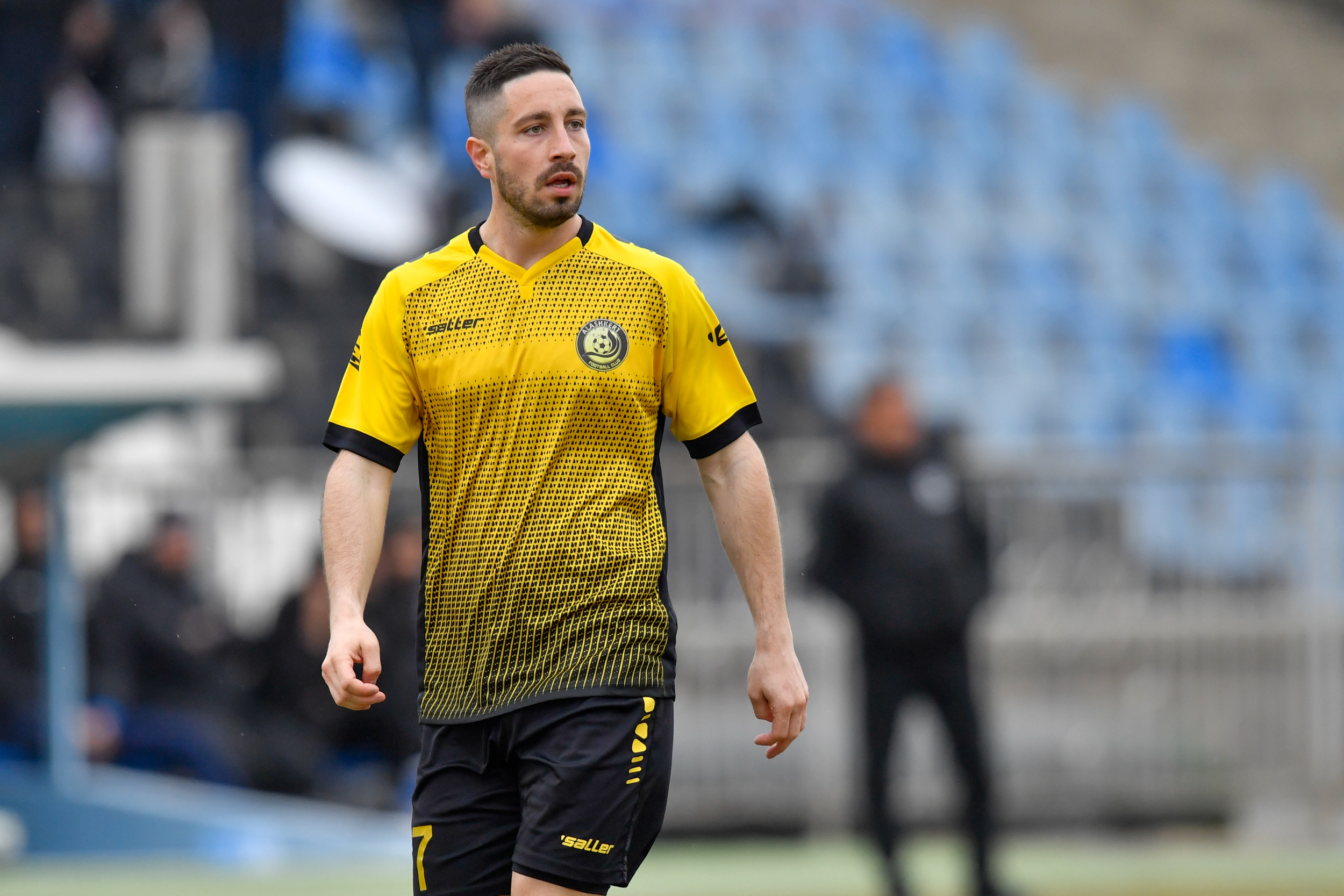

Personal information
- Full name: Mateo Mužek
- Date of birth: 29 April 1995 (age 31)
- Place of birth: Graz, Austria
- Height: 1.83 m (6 ft 0 in)
- Positions: Left back; centre back

Team information
- Current team: Široki Brijeg
- Number: 3

Youth career
- 2004-2006: Kustošija
- 2006–2013: Hrvatski Dragovoljac

Senior career*
Years	Team	Apps	(Gls)
2012–2014	Hrvatski Dragovoljac	2	(0)
2014–2015	Gorica	22	(0)
2015–2016	Zavrč	17	(0)
2016–2017	Rudar Velenje	38	(0)
2017–2018	Neftchi Baku	2	(0)
2018	Shakhter Karagandy	30	(0)
2019	St. Mirren	16	(0)
2019	Sheriff Tiraspol	15	(0)
2020–2021	AE Larissa	21	(1)
2021-2022	Radomlje	30	(0)
2022-2023	Kyzylzhar	11	(0)
2023	Alashkert	29	(2)
2024–	Široki Brijeg	11	(0)

International career
2013	Croatia U19	2	(0)
2015	Croatia U20	2	(0)
2015	Croatia U21	1	(0)
- * Club domestic league appearances and goals as of 1 June 2024

Mateo Mužek (born 29 April 1995) is a Croatian professional football player who plays as a left back for Široki Brijeg in Premier League of Bosnia and Herzegovina.

== Career ==
On 28 July 2017, Mužek signed a two-year contract with Neftchi Baku. He left the club on 21 February 2018.

On 26 January 2019, Mužek signed for Scottish Premiership side St. Mirren on deal until the end of the season. Muzek left Saints at the end of his contract and signed for Sheriff Tiraspol. Muzek signed a two-year contract with Greek side AE Larisa on a free transfer on 17 January 2020.

On 31 January 2023, Alashkert announced the signing of Mužek.

As of 11 July 2024, he was transferred to Albania playing with Dinamo city.

== Personal life ==
His father Damir played professionally in Austria.
