= Bladimir Díaz =

Colombian footballer (born 1992)

Personal information
- Full name: Bladimir Yovany Díaz Saavedra
- Date of birth: 10 July 1992 (age 34)
- Place of birth: Buenaventura, Colombia
- Height: 1.78 m (5 ft 10 in)
- Position: Forward

Team information
- Current team: Alashkert
- Number: 95

Senior career*
Years	Team	Apps	(Gls)
2006	Pumas de Casanare		
2007–2008	Real Santander		
2009–2010	Alianza Petrolera		
2010–2012	A.D. El Roble		
2012–2014	Once Lobos		
2014–2018	CD Chalatenango	97	(52)
2018–2020	Alianza	44	(25)
2019	→ Nongbua Pitchaya (loan)	11	(8)
2020	→ Comunicaciones (loan)	11	(5)
2020–2021	Comunicaciones	10	(2)
2021	Cobán Imperial	16	(4)
2021–2022	Chalatenango	18	(7)
2022	FAS	21	(9)
2022	Alashkert	18	(11)
2023	Al-Diriyah	3	(0)
2023	Sektzia Ness Ziona	4	(0)
2023–2024	Sheikh Jamal DC	2	(0)
2024	Alashkert	5	(0)
2025	Deportivo San Pedro	5	(0)
2025-	Fuerte Aguilares		
- * Club domestic league appearances and goals as of 28 November 2024

Bladimir Yovany Díaz Saavedra (born 10 July 1992) is a Colombian professional footballer who plays as a forward for Alashkert in the Armenian Premier League.

== Club career ==
=== Chalatenango ===
After 34 goals for Chalatenango in the Segunda División de El Salvador, he scored 28 in 40 appearances in his first full season in the Salvadoran Primera División.

Díaz finished as the top scorer of the Clausura 2016 tournament, scoring 15 goals.

=== Alianza ===
Díaz signed with Alianza for the Apertura 2018 tournament. In November 2018, Díaz scored two goals in a 4–1 victory against Pasaquina at the Estadio Cuscatlán.

In December 2018, Alianza reached the Apertura 2018 final, its fifth consecutive final since the Apertura 2016. Díaz scored 7 goals during the Apertura 2018.

=== Alashkert ===
In June 2022, Díaz signed for Armenian Premier League club Alashkert alongside fellow Colombian Fabio Burbano. On 24 December 2022, Alashkert announced the departure of Díaz.

=== Al-Diriyah ===
On 27 December 2022, Díaz joined Saudi Arabian club Al-Diriyah; however, he was released from his contract three weeks later.

=== Sheikh Jamal DC ===
In October 2023, Díaz joined Bangladesh Premier League side Sheikh Jamal DC. However, he was released by the club in the middle of the season due to poor performance.

=== Alashkert return ===
On 1 August 2024, Díaz was announced as part of Alashkert's squad for the 2024–25 season.
