= David Khurtsidze =

Russian footballer

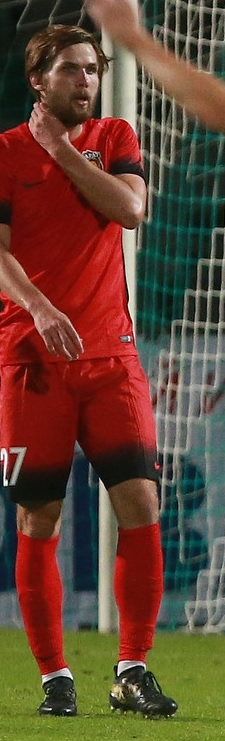
- Khurtsidze with Ararat Moscow in 2017

Personal information
- Full name: David Khvichayevich Khurtsidze
- Date of birth: 4 July 1993 (age 33)
- Place of birth: Biysk, Russia
- Height: 1.85 m (6 ft 1 in)
- Position: Midfielder

Team information
- Current team: Gonio
- Number: 21

Youth career
- –2006: DYuSSh-70 Molniya Moscow
- 2006–2011: CSKA Moscow

Senior career*
Years	Team	Apps	(Gls)
2011–2014	CSKA Moscow	0	(0)
2013	→ Zenit Penza (loan)	15	(2)
2013	→ Torpedo Kutaisi (loan)	5	(2)
2014–2015	Ulisses	19	(2)
2015	Torpedo Armavir	15	(0)
2016–2017	Amkar Perm	4	(0)
2017	Torpedo Kutaisi	1	(0)
2017–2018	Ararat Moscow	24	(3)
2018–2019	Ararat Moscow (amateur)		
2019–2021	Ararat Yerevan	48	(6)
2021–2022	Alashkert	31	(5)
2022–2023	Urartu	28	(2)
2023–2024	Alashkert	35	(7)
2025–	Gonio	4	(0)

International career
2010	Russia U-17	2	(0)
- * Club domestic league appearances and goals as of 12 April 2025

David Khvichayevich Khurtsidze (Russian: Давид Хвичаевич Хурцидзе; born 4 July 1993) is a Russian professional footballer who plays as a midfielder for Georgian club Gonio.

== Club career ==
In June 2013 Khurtsidze moved on a yearlong loan to Zenit Penza. He made his debut in the Russian Second Division for FC Zenit Penza on 16 July 2013 in a game against FC Metallurg-Oskol Stary Oskol.

In February 2016, Khurtsidze signed a contract with FC Amkar Perm that began in the summer of 2016 (as he already played for two clubs in the 2015-16 season and was not eligible to be registered with Amkar in the winter).

In May 2017 Khurtsidze left Amkar Perm, signing for Torpedo Kutaisi in June of the same year.

On 26 June 2019, Khurtsidze was one of 13 players to sign for Ararat Yerevan. At the end of the 2020–21 season, Ararat Yerevan announced that Khurtsidze had left the club after his contract had expired.

On 30 August 2022, Khurtsidze left Alashkert after his contract was terminated by mutual consent, signing for Urartu on 9 September 2022. On 19 June 2023, Urartu announced that Khurtsidze had left the club after his contract was terminated by mutual agreement. On 27 June 2023, Alashkert announced the return of Khurtsidze.

== Career statistics ==
=== Club ===
As of match played 26 May 2024

Appearances and goals by club, season and competition
Club	Season	League			National Cup		League Cup		Continental		Other		Total	
Club	Season	Division	Apps	Goals	Apps	Goals	Apps	Goals	Apps	Goals	Apps	Goals	Apps	Goals
CSKA Moscow	2011–12	Russian Premier League	0	0	0	0	-		0	0	0	0	0	0
CSKA Moscow	2012–13	Russian Premier League	0	0	0	0	-		0	0	-		0	0
CSKA Moscow	2013–14	Russian Premier League	0	0	0	0	-		0	0	0	0	0	0
CSKA Moscow	Total		0	0	0	0	-	-	0	0	0	0	0	0
Zenit Penza (loan)	2013–14	Russian Professional Football League	15	2	1	0	–		–		–		16	2
Torpedo Kutaisi (loan)	2013–14	Umaglesi Liga	5	2	0	0	–		–		–		5	2
Ulisses	2014–15	Armenian Premier League	22	2	2	0	–		2	0	–		26	2
Torpedo Armavir	2015–16	Russian Football National League	15	0	2	0	–		–		–		17	0
Amkar Perm	2015–16	Russian Premier League	0	0	0	0	–		–		–		0	0
Amkar Perm	2016–17	Russian Premier League	4	0	0	0	–		–		–		4	0
Amkar Perm	Total		4	0	0	0	-	-	-	-	-	-	4	0
Torpedo Kutaisi	2017	Erovnuli Liga	1	0	0	0	–		2	0	–		3	0
Ararat Moscow	2017–18	Russian Professional Football League	24	3	4	3	–		–		–		28	6
Ararat Yerevan	2019–20	Armenian Premier League	26	4	1	0	–		–		–		27	4
Ararat Yerevan	2020–21	Armenian Premier League	22	2	7	2	–		–		–		29	4
Ararat Yerevan	Total		48	6	8	2	-	-	-	-	-	-	56	8
Alashkert	2021–22	Armenian Premier League	30	5	1	0	–		12	2	1	0	44	7
Alashkert	2022–23	Armenian Premier League	1	0	0	0	–		2	0	–		3	0
Alashkert	Total		31	5	1	0	-	-	14	2	1	0	47	7
Urartu	2022–23	Armenian Premier League	28	2	3	2	–		–		–		31	4
Alashkert	2023–24	Armenian Premier League	35	7	1	0	–		4	0	–		40	7
Career total			228	29	22	7	-	-	22	2	1	0	269	37

== Honours ==
=== Club ===
Urartu

- Armenian Premier League: 2022–23
- Armenian Cup: 2022–23

Alashkert

- Armenian Supercup: 2021
