= FK Csíkszereda Miercurea Ciuc =

Association football club in Miercurea Ciuc

Csíkszereda
- Full name: Asociația Futball Klub Csíkszereda Miercurea Ciuc
- Nicknames: Ciucanii (The Ciuc People); Székelyek / Secuii (The Székelys); Vörös-feketék / Roș-negrii (The Red and Blacks)
- Short name: Csíki, Ciuc
- Founded: 1904; 122 years ago as Csíkszereda; 1919; 107 years ago as AEF din Miercurea Ciuc; 2010; 16 years ago as CSM (VSK) Miercurea Ciuc
- Ground: Municipal
- Capacity: 2,480
- Owner: Miercurea Ciuc Municipality
- Chairman: János Bokor
- Head coach: Valentin Suciu
- League: Liga I
- 2025–26: Liga I, 11th of 16
- Website: fkcsikszereda.ro
Home colours

Asociația Futball Klub Csíkszereda Miercurea Ciuc (Hungarian: [ˈt͡ʃiːksɛrɛdɒ], Romanian: [ˈmjerkure̯a ˈtʃjuk]), commonly known as Csíkszereda Miercurea Ciuc or simply Csíkszereda, is a Romanian professional football club based in Miercurea Ciuc, Harghita County, that competes in the Liga I.

The club's current name combines the Hungarian and Romanian names of the city, with Székelys representing the predominant ethnic group of Miercurea Ciuc. Originally established in 1904 in Austria-Hungary and refounded in 1919 in Romania, Csíkszereda competed in both the Romanian and Hungarian league systems during the first half of the 20th century, reaching the second tier of Hungarian football after Northern Transylvania was ceded to Hungary in 1940. Following World War II, the club spent most of its history in the lower divisions of Romanian football, first reaching the third tier in 1971.

After the fall of communism in 1989, financial difficulties led to periods of decline, including a withdrawal from competitions in 2000. Following its 2010 refoundation however, Csíkszereda climbed steadily through the league system, earning promotion to the second division in 2019 and making its Liga I debut in the 2025–26 season.

The team plays its home matches at the Municipal Stadium, which was redeveloped and expanded in the 2010s.

== History ==
=== First years between Hungary and Romania (1904–1971) ===
Although the history of football from Miercurea Ciuc started back in 1904, when Transylvania was still part of Austria-Hungary, the football club of the city was an amateur one, without significant results at the national level. The club was re-founded in 1919 at a superior level of professionalism, under the name of Asociația de Educație Fizică din Miercurea Ciuc and became part of the Kingdom of Romania, but the following years turned out to be as unfruitful as before for "the Székelys", who couldn't achieve notable results in the Romanian leagues.

In August 1940 Kingdom of Hungary annexed Northern Transylvania, including Miercurea Ciuc, as a result of the Second Vienna Award and the team started to appear on the map of the Hungarian leagues under the Hungarian name of Csíkszeredai Testnevelési Egylet (Association of Physical Education in Csíkszereda). During the 1943–44 season Ciucanii were part of the third tier, Nemzeti Bajnokság III, Székely Land series, where they finished last, 5th out of only five teams. Next season, 1944–45, Csíkszeredai TE was part of the second league, Nemzeti Bajnokság II, due to the expansion of the league system, but the championship was interrupted due to the movement of the front in the World War II, and Csíkszeredai TE never played in the Hungarian leagues again: the annexed region was occupied by Romanian troops in 1944 and awarded to Kingdom of Romania at the end of the war.

Back in the Romanian leagues under the newly established Communist regime, the life of the Székelys was not an easy one, even in the beginning (until 1960) the Stalinist regime in his attempt to administer the country through raions, founded a raion named Magyar Autonomous Region. The oppressive regime began the forced nationalization and the people of Hungarian ethnicity, as well as the Székelys, were frequently forced to change their name, in a one with Romanian roots. The cases of footballers of Hungarian ethnicity forced to change their name were often, among them: József Pecsovszky who became Iosif Petschovschi, Lajos Szatmári (Ludovic Sătmăreanu), Sándor Kulcsár (Alexandru Culcear), Emerich Jenei (Emeric Ienei). Lack of support from the regime combined also with the little interest of the local people for football, in a city where Ice hockey and HSC Csíkszereda (multiple champions of Romania) were the main attraction, have resulted in poor to very weak results for the football team, which played in the amateur leagues, Divizia D, until 1971.

=== Ascent to Divizia C (1971–1990) ===
Name	Period
Csíkszereda	1904–1918
AEF din Miercurea Ciuc	1919–1940
Csíkszereda TE	1940–1944
AS Miercurea Ciuc	1944–1976
IUPS Miercurea Ciuc	1976–1978
Tractorul Miercurea Ciuc	1978–1987
Rapid Miercurea Ciuc	1987–2010
CSM (VSK) Miercurea Ciuc	2010–2012
FK Csíkszereda Miercurea Ciuc	2012–

1971–72 season was the first one played by the club in the Divizia C, but AS Miercurea Ciuc, as it was named then, relegated, after finishing 13th out of 14. Only one season spent the club from Miercurea Ciuc in the fourth tier, before promoting back, at the end of the 1972–73 edition. Followed three consecutive seasons in which the club achieved its best performances until then, 1973–74 – 5th, 1974–75 – 8th and 1975–76 – 15th. The rank obtained at the end of the last season brought another relegation for the club, but Ciucanii had now the taste of higher levels football and after another season spent in the Divizia D, promoted back.

The third spell of "the Red and Blacks" on the third stage of the Romanian football was a longer one, originally under the name of IUPS Miercurea Ciuc, name of the main sponsor, IUPS (Întreprinderea de Utilaje și Piese de Schimb) translated as Machinery and Spare Parts Undertaking, a factory under the direct rule of the communist regime (as all the factories from that period), at the same time signaling the fact that the regime finally turned its "face" to the football from the region, the club was ranked 9th at the end of the 1977–78 season. In 1978 IUPS became a subsidiary of Uzina Tractorul Brașov (Romanian main tractors factory) and changed its name in Tractor Undertaking, the football team followed its main sponsor and changed its name in Tractorul Miercurea Ciuc. For the next five seasons in which the club from Miercurea Ciuc played in the third tier, the following rankings were obtained: 1978–79 – 7th, 1979–80 – 14th, 1980–81 – 6th, 1981–82 – 7th and 1982–83 – 16th.

"The Székelys" promoted back in 1988, after five years of absence, this time under the name of Rapid Miercurea Ciuc. 1988–89 season was a historical one for Rapid, which was ranked 3rd, right behind IMASA Sfântu Gheorghe and Progresul Odorheiu Secuiesc, surpassing its old record, 5th place at the end of the 1973–74 edition, then avoiding a last-minute relegation at the end of the 1989–90 season (14th out of 16th). Romanian Revolution of 1989 was not necessarily a rescue for the club, which was in its last decade sponsored by the regime through its factory.

=== Ups and downs, dissolution and rebirth (1990–2014) ===
The 1990s was a tumultuous period for Rapid, as for many Romanian clubs, pivoting quite enough between the 3rd, respectively 4th level of the Romanian football. The club from Miercurea Ciuc divided the decade, five years being spent in the Divizia C and five years in the Divizia D, with the following results: 1990–91 – 7th, 1991–92 – 5th (withdrew at the end of the season), 1992–93 – 1st (promoted back to Divizia C), 1993–94 – 17th (relegated), 1994–95 – 2nd in Divizia D, 1995–96 – 1st in Divizia D, 1996–97 – 1st (promoted), 1997–98 – 15th (relegated), 1998–99 – 1st (promoted), 1999–2000 – 15th (relegated).

After a decade full of ups and downs, the club started the 2000s as a newly relegated team, but surprisingly the club was included by the Romanian Football Federation for 2000–01 season of Divizia C. In the summer of 2000 due to lack of founds, Rapid withdrew, before the start of the season. This was basically the end of an era for the football from the county seat of Harghita County. Due to lack of funds and with the fans being more oriented to the ice hockey team, most popular of the county's clubs, Rapid continued the activity at the limit of subsistence, until finally succumbed. In 2010 the football club was re-founded, this time under the name of CSM Miercurea Ciuc, also known in Hungarian as VSK Csíkszereda, and after a 2nd place at the end of the 2010–11 edition, Ciucanii won the Harghita County championship at the end of the 2011–12 season, but lost the Liga III promotion play-off, with the score of 1–5, against CSM Făgăraș, Brașov County champions.

In the summer of 2012 CSM Miercurea Ciuc was renamed as FK Miercurea Ciuc, also known in Hungarian as FK Csíkszereda. Led by former player of Rapid București and FC Brașov, Róbert Ilyés, who was named in 2013 as player-manager of the squad, the Székelys won again the Liga IV, Harghita Series, but lost dramatically the promotion play-off, this time 2–3 against Mureșul Luduș, Mureș County champions. After winning the third consecutive season of Liga IV, Harghita Series, Ciucanii finally promoted at the end of the 2013–14 season, after a 2–0 win against ASF Zărnești, champions of Brașov County. Also in 2013, the club has entered into a partnership with NB I member Puskás Akadémia and they created The Football Academy of Székely Land.

=== Golden Age (2014–present) ===
Unlike its region colleague, Sepsi OSK Sfântu Gheorghe, which has been promoted consecutively to the first league, FK Csíkszereda encountered some difficulties. The first season spent in the third tier, after an absence of 14 years, was finished on the 6th place, then followed by a 5th place at the end of the 2015–16 edition. 2016–17 season brought an important performance, "the Red and Blacks" being ranked 3rd, thus equaling their best performance, obtained in 1989, 28 years before. But this performance was in fact, a real drama because FK Miercurea Ciuc led the series until the final round, when they lost 0–1 at home, against Știința Miroslava, Miroslava promoting also after CSM Pașcani goalkeeper scored a goal in the last minute of the match against AFC Hărman, another aspirant for promotion. After missing the promotion for a distance of 1 point, Miercurea Ciuc started full of hope the 2017–18 season, but this time missed the promotion for 2 points, however being ranked 2nd, the best performance of the club ever.

In the summer of 2018 Romanian Football Federation moved the team from the first series (Moldavia region) to the fifth series (Transylvania region) region. Even if some rivals saw it as an advantage, Miercurea Ciuc/Csíkszereda had a tough battle, but not against Minaur Baia Mare or 1. FC Gloria (the unofficial successor of Gloria Bistrița), which were seen as main rivals, but against Comuna Recea, a total surprise of the season. Finally "the Red and Black" promoted to Liga II, for the first time in the history of 115 years of football from Miercurea Ciuc. In this season the club was led from the bench by Valentin Suciu, the man who also promoted Sepsi OSK Sfântu Gheorghe from Liga IV to Liga I. Suciu also led the team to the best result in the Romanian Cup, where it was eliminated only in the quarter-finals by the top-flight side CS Universitatea Craiova, but not before eliminating Dinamo București in the round of 16.

The great run from the Romanian Cup, bring in the press the information that along with several other sponsors, FK Miercurea Ciuc (FK Csíkszereda) receives financing from the Government of Hungary, which has sparked controversy in Romania. However, the sum of €3.2 million—which can double if performance clauses are met—is supposed to be invested exclusively in club infrastructure development and the youth sector. Hungarian clubs, Ferencváros and Kispest Honvéd, paid the fines of 25 312 Romanian leu (around 1.9 million HUF) that the club received for uses of flags of Transylvania.

== Ground ==
The club plays its home matches on Municipal Stadium in Miercurea Ciuc, which has a capacity of 1,200 seats. Opened in the first part of the 20th century, the stadium underwent important expansion and renovation works between 2016 and 2017, which were sponsored by the Government of Hungary. Second stands was added in 2021-22 increasing the total capacity to 4,000 seats.

== Support ==
FK Miercurea Ciuc has many supporters in Miercurea Ciuc and especially in Harghita County. Even if the club does not have an ultras group, "the Red and Blacks" are well supported by the local community, which creates an enthusiastic atmosphere at the home matches. FK Csíkszereda supporters consider Sepsi OSK Sfântu Gheorghe supporters (Székely Légió) to be their allies, fans of both teams had the opportunity to support the other during important matches. During the matches, they are used to display flags of the Székely Land and Hungary.

=== Rivalries ===
FK Miercurea Ciuc does not have many important rivalries, however, a local one, of little intensity, exist against AFC Odorheiu Secuiesc.

== Honours ==
=== Leagues ===
Liga III

- Winners (1): 2018–19
- Runners-up (1): 2017–18

Divizia D / Liga IV – Harghita County

- Winners (14): 1969–70, 1970–71, 1972–73, 1976–77, 1984–85, 1985–86, 1987–88, 1992–93, 1995–96, 1996–97, 1998–99, 2011–12, 2012–13, 2013–14
- Runners-up (4): 1968–69, 1983–84, 1994–95, 2010–11

=== Cups ===
Cupa României – Harghita County

- Winners (3): 2011–12, 2012–13, 2013–14
- Runners-up (1): 2010–11

== Players ==
=== First-team squad ===
As of 19 November 2026

Note: Flags indicate national team as defined under FIFA eligibility rules; some limited exceptions apply. Players may hold more than one non-FIFA nationality.

No.	Pos.	Nation	Player
1	GK	ROU	Zsombor Deáky
3	DF	ROU	Raul Palmeș (4th captain)
4	DF	HUN	Alex Szabó
6	DF	ROU	Lóránd Pászka (Vice-captain)
7	FW	MNE	Dušan Vuković
8	MF	ROU	Szilárd Vereș (Captain)
9	FW	SLO	Nino Kukovec (on loan from Dunajská Streda)
10	MF	ESP	Soufiane Jebari
11	MF	HUN	Artúr Horváth (on loan from MTK Budapest)
13	MF	ROU	Attila Csürös (3rd captain)
15	MF	ROU	Ervin Bakoș
17	FW	HUN	Ádám Czékus
18	MF	HUN	Mátyás Tajti
19	MF	ROU	Victor Oniga

No.	Pos.	Nation	Player
20	MF	BRA	Lima
21	MF	ROU	Apor Máthé
22	DF	HUN	Máté Ódor (on loan from Vasas)
24	DF	HUN	János Hegedűs
27	FW	HUN	Márton Eppel
29	DF	ROU	Răzvan Trif
30	MF	HUN	Zsolt Magyar (on loan from Puskás Akadémia)
34	GK	ROU	Márk Karácsony
53	MF	ROU	Botond Szondi
55	MF	ROU	Darius Bota
77	MF	ROU	Albert Stahl
79	FW	HUN	Szabolcs Szalay
94	GK	ROU	Eduard Pap

=== Dual registration ===
Note: Flags indicate national team as defined under FIFA eligibility rules; some limited exceptions apply. Players may hold more than one non-FIFA nationality.

No.	Pos.	Nation	Player
5	DF	ROU	György Papp (at CSA Steaua București)
14	FW	ROU	Luca Noveli (at CSA Steaua București)
16	MF	ROU	Előd Tóth-Pál (at CSA Steaua București)

No.	Pos.	Nation	Player
33	GK	ROU	Máté Simon (at CSA Steaua București)
90	MF	ROU	Szabolcs Nyitra (at CSA Steaua București)

=== Out on loan ===
Note: Flags indicate national team as defined under FIFA eligibility rules; some limited exceptions apply. Players may hold more than one non-FIFA nationality.

No.	Pos.	Nation	Player
—	GK	ROU	Michele Antonucci (at Odorheiu Secuiesc until 30 June 2027)
—	MF	ROU	Szilárd Balogh (at CS Gheorgheni until 30 June 2027)

No.	Pos.	Nation	Player
—	MF	ROU	Szabolcs Szilágyi (at Unirea Slobozia until 30 June 2027)

== Club officials ==
=== Board of directors ===
Role	Name
Owner	(Romania) Miercurea Ciuc Municipality
President	(Romania) Zoltán Szondy
Board members	(Romania) István Fodor (Romania) Tibor Negoiţă (Romania) Előd Papp
Economic Director	(Romania) Albin Bíró
General Manager	(Romania) János Bokor
Sporting director	(Romania) Szilárd Cseke
Youth Center Director	(Romania) Zoltán Dusinszki
Delegate	(Romania) Claudiu Cazan
Team manager	(Romania) Eugen Pârvulescu
Press Officer	(Romania) Attila Rédai

=== Current technical staff ===
Role	Name
Head coach	(Romania) Valentin Suciu
Assistant coach	(Romania) Barna Bajkó
Video analyst	(Romania) Áron Keszler
Goalkeeping coach	(Romania) Barna Nagy
Fitness coach	(Romania) Șerban Neamțu
Club doctor	(Romania) Loránd Hegyessy
Physiotherapist	(Romania) Angyal Gaál
Masseurs	(Romania) Zoltán Sajgó (Romania) László Mikó
Storeman	(Romania) Gergely Bölöny

== Notable former players ==
The footballers enlisted below have had international cap(s) for their respective countries at junior and/or senior level and/or significant caps for FK Csíkszereda Miercurea Ciuc.

Romania

- (Romania) Erwin Bloj
- (Romania) Efraim Bödő
- (Romania) Marius Corbu
- (Romania) Lóránd Fülöp
- (Romania) Szilárd Gyenge
- (Romania) Róbert Ilyés
- (Romania) Petre Ivanovici
- (Romania) Lóránt Kovács
- (Romania) Paul Pîrvulescu
- (Romania) Marvin Schieb
- (Romania) Rareș Takács
- (Romania) Dániel Vita

Argentina

- (Argentina) Juan Bauza

Brazil

- (Brazil) Anderson Ceará

Hungary

- (Hungary) Benjamin Babati
- (Hungary) Dávid Bor
- (Hungary) Richárd Jelena
- (Hungary) Dávid Kelemen
- (Hungary) László Kleinheisler
- (Hungary) Gábor Makrai
- (Hungary) János Nagy
- (Hungary) Norbert Pintér

Slovakia

- (Slovakia) Jozef Dolný
- (Slovakia) Peter Gál-Andrezly

Spain

- (Spain) Eder González

== Notable former managers ==
- (Romania) László Balint
- (Romania) Francisc Dican
- (Romania) Róbert Ilyés

== League history ==
Season	Tier	Division	Place	Notes	National Cup
2026–27	1	Liga I	TBD		TBD
2025–26	1	Liga I	11th		Group Stage
2024–25	2	Liga II	3rd	Promoted	Group Stage
2023–24	2	Liga II	6th		Play-off round
2022–23	2	Liga II	11th		Play-off round
2021–22	2	Liga II	7th		Round of 32
2020–21	2	Liga II	5th		Round of 32
2019–20	2	Liga II	17th		Round of 32
2018–19	3	Liga III (Seria V)	1st (C)	Promoted	Quarter-finals
2017–18	3	Liga III (Seria I)	2nd		Third Round
2016–17	3	Liga III (Seria I)	3rd		Third Round
2015–16	3	Liga III (Seria V)	5th		Second Round
2014–15	3	Liga III (Seria I)	6th		Second Round
2013–14	4	Liga IV (HR)	1st (C)	Promoted	First Round
2012–13	4	Liga IV (HR)	1st (C)		Second Round

Season	Tier	Division	Place	Notes	National Cup
2011–12	4	Liga IV (HR)	1st (C)		
2000–01	3	Divizia C (Seria I)	16th	Relegated	
1999–00	3	Divizia C (Seria I)	15th		
1998–99	4	Divizia D (HR)	1st (C)	Promoted	
1997–98	3	Divizia C (Seria I)	15th	Relegated	
1996–97	4	Divizia D (HR)	1st (C)	Promoted	
1995–96	4	Divizia D (HR)	1st (C)		
1994–95	4	Divizia D (HR)	2nd		
1993–94	3	Divizia C (Seria I)	17th	Relegated	Round of 16
1992–93	4	Divizia D (HR)	1st (C)	Promoted	
1991–92	3	Divizia C (Seria VIII)	5th	Relegated	
1990–91	3	Divizia C (Seria IX)	7th		
1989–90	3	Divizia C (Seria II)	14th		
