= Kevin Reyes =

Salvadoran footballer (born 1999)

Personal information
- Full name: Kevin Stiven Reyes Ortiz
- Date of birth: 28 August 1999 (age 27)
- Place of birth: El Salvador
- Height: 1.75 m (5 ft 9 in)
- Positions: Midfielder; winger

Team information
- Current team: Águila
- Number: 11

Senior career*
Years	Team	Apps	(Gls)
–2020	Santa Tecla	138	(12)
2019	→ Águila (loan)	14	(2)
2021–2022	FAS	51	(9)
2022	Alashkert	9	(3)
2022–2023	FAS	43	(10)
2023–2024	Aguila	42	
2025–	Isidro Metapan	11	(0)

International career
2021–	El Salvador	22	(0)
- * Club domestic league appearances and goals as of 16 December 2022

Kevin Stiven Reyes Ortiz (born 28 August 1999) is a Salvadoran professional footballer who plays as a midfielder or winger for Primera División club Águila and the El Salvador national team.

== Career ==
Reyes started his career with Salvadoran side Santa Tecla. Before the second half of 2020–21, he signed for FAS in the Salvadoran top flight. In September 2022, Reyes signed for Armenian club Alashkert, becoming the first Salvadoran to play in Armenia. On 16 December 2022, FAS announced the return of Reyes.
