= Sergei Ivanov (footballer, born 1997) =

Russian footballer

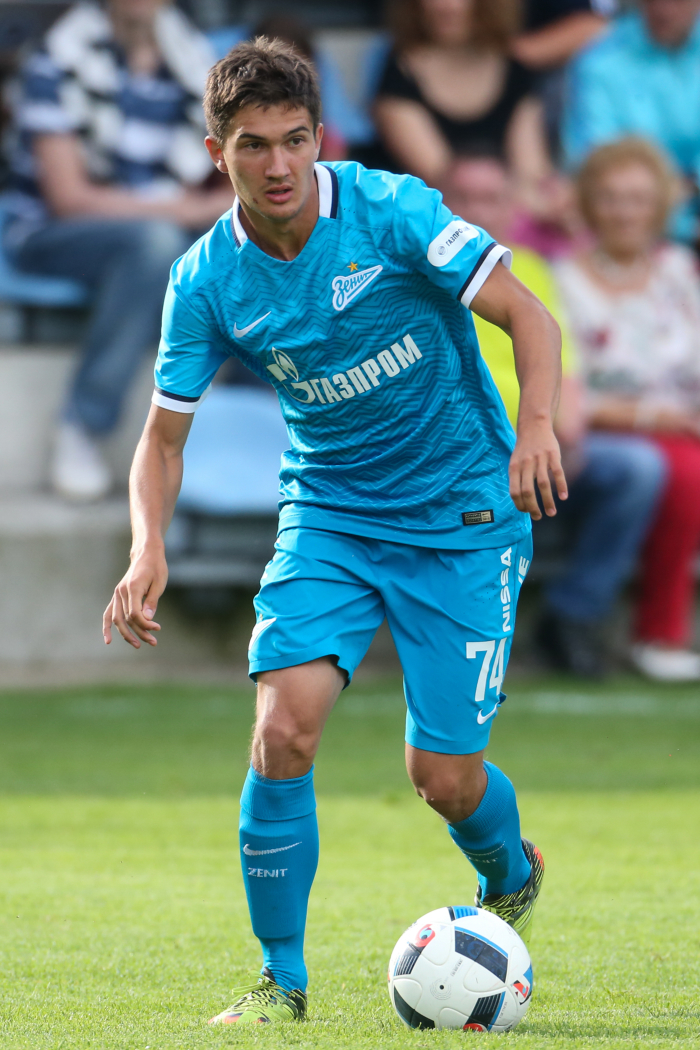

Personal information
- Full name: Sergei Alekseyevich Ivanov
- Date of birth: 7 January 1997 (age 29)
- Place of birth: Saint Petersburg, Russia
- Height: 1.72 m (5 ft 8 in)
- Position: Midfielder

Senior career*
Years	Team	Apps	(Gls)
2015–2022	Zenit Saint Petersburg	0	(0)
2015–2016	→ Zenit-2 St. Petersburg	14	(0)
2016–2017	→ VSS Košice (loan)	22	(3)
2017–2019	→ Zenit-2 St. Petersburg	55	(4)
2020	→ Krylia Sovetov Samara (loan)	0	(0)
2020	→ Zenit-2 St. Petersburg	1	(0)
2020–2021	→ Zemplín Michalovce (loan)	13	(0)
2021–2022	→ Zenit-2 St. Petersburg	18	(0)
2022–2024	Alashkert	15	(3)
2022	→ Alashkert-2	1	(0)

International career^{‡}
2012	Russia U15	1	(0)
2013	Russia U16	3	(1)
- * Club domestic league appearances and goals as of 1 February 2024 ‡ National team caps and goals as of 29 May 2013

Sergei Alekseyevich Ivanov (Russian: Сергей Алексеевич Иванов; born 7 January 1997) is a Russian football player who plays as a right midfielder or attacking midfielder.

== Club career ==
He made his debut in the Russian Professional Football League for Zenit St. Petersburg 2 on 17 April 2015 in a game against Volga Tver. He made his Russian Football National League debut for Zenit-2 on 12 July 2015 in a game against Torpedo Armavir.

On 5 September 2016, he joined VSS Košice on loan.

He made his debut for the main squad of Zenit Saint Petersburg on 25 September 2019 in a Russian Cup game against Yenisey Krasnoyarsk.

On 6 February 2020, he joined Krylia Sovetov Samara on loan until the end of the 2019–20 season, with an option to buy. He left Krylia Sovetov on 1 June 2020.

On 24 July 2020, he joined Zemplín Michalovce on loan.

On 9 September 2022, Alashkert announced the signing of Ivanov.

== Honours ==
=== Club ===
Zenit Saint Petersburg

- Russian Cup: 2019–20
