= Thiago Galvão =

Brazilian footballer

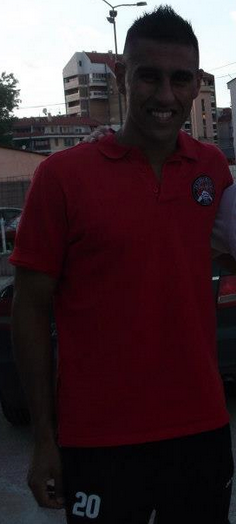
- Tiago Galvão in 2013

Personal information
- Full name: Thiago Galvão da Silva
- Date of birth: 24 August 1989 (age 37)
- Place of birth: São Paulo, Brazil
- Height: 1.85 m (6 ft 1 in)
- Position: Forward

Senior career*
Years	Team	Apps	(Gls)
2007–2010	Paulista		
2011–2014	Sloboda Užice	99	(21)
2014–2015	Sheriff Tiraspol	23	(1)
2015–2016	Čukarički	13	(1)
2016–2017	Borac Čačak	30	(5)
2017–2018	Chaves	8	(0)
2018–2019	Floriana	16	(2)
2019–2021	Alashkert	43	(10)
2022	Pyunik	5	(0)
2022–2023	Alashkert	33	(9)
2023	Kolubara	9	(1)
2025	Dourados AC		
2025	FAP	9	(0)
- * Club domestic league appearances and goals as of 8 October 2026

Thiago Galvão da Silva (born 24 August 1989), commonly known as Thiago Galvão, is a Brazilian former professional footballer who played as either a striker or an attacking midfielder.

== Career ==
Thiago Galvão played in Brazil with Paulista Futebol Clube from 2007 to 2010. In 2011, he joined Serbian side Sloboda Užice.

=== Sloboda Užice ===
Thiago Galvão and Paulista teammate Ricardinho came to Serbia in January 2011 and played 11 matches with newly promoted FK Sloboda Point Sevojno until the end of the season. He made his league debut coming on as a late substitute against FK Spartak Zlatibor Voda in April 2011.

==== 2010–11 season ====
Upon joining Sloboda in 2011, Thiago Galvão spent the first season adjusting to the league in Serbia, during which he didn't score a single goal in the 11 games he appeared in.

==== 2011–12 season ====
His exhibitions from previous season satisfied the club management and during summer he was offered to stay, while Ricardinho returned to Brazil. He immediately responded by being named the best player of the main tournament his club played during summer pre-season. During the summer Sloboda changed much of the squad. As a result, Thiago got more playing time and started 29 games out of 29 games he played. Even though he played as a striker at Paulista, coach Ljubiša Stamenković gave him the role of an attacking midfielder. In the first half of the 2011–12 season, he and Filip Kasalica (before he departed to join Red Star Belgrade) were listed as the most formidable striker partnership in the entire league. Thiago scored 6 goals and had 8 assists that season and was one of the best players in the league, attracting interest from domestic clubs as well as clubs from the Western Europe.

==== 2012–13 season ====
During the 2013 winter transfer window, clubs such as FK Partizan, Red Star Belgrade, and FC Rostov were interested in Thiago Galvão. Rostov even made a bid of €450,000 for the player, but Sloboda rejected it. In March during a game against FK Jagodina, Thiago scored a beautiful overhead kick goal. He helped the club finish fifth for the second straight season with 8 goals and 8 assists. He played all 30 games. For the second season in a row Galvão was included in the league's most statistically effective strike partnership, this time with Predrag Ranđelović who replaced Kasalica upon his departure to Red Star Belgrade.

==== 2013–14 season ====
The 2013 season started slowly with Thiago Galvão having a goalless drought for six straight games, due to still recovering from injury, and then he scored his first hat-trick for the club on 25 September, against Teleoptik in the Serbian Cup. He scored his first league goal against OFK Beograd on 5 October 2013. On 23 November Tiago scored another overhead kick, this time against Red Star to give his team the lead, but Sloboda lost 4–1. On 22 April 2014, Tiago played his 100th game for Sloboda against Javor, providing the only goal of the game with an assist. In what was a really poor season for Sloboda, finishing last and getting relegated, Tiago was by far the best player.

=== Sheriff Tiraspol ===
On 3 July 2014, Thiago Galvão signed for Moldovan side FC Sheriff Tiraspol.

=== Pyunik ===
On 17 January 2022, Galvão signed for Pyunik.

== Career statistics ==
As of 30 June 2017

Appearances and goals by club, season and competition
Club	Season	League		Cup		Europe		Other		Total	
Club	Season	Apps	Goals	Apps	Goals	Apps	Goals	Apps	Goals	Apps	Goals!
Sloboda Užice	2010–11	11	0	0	0	—		—		11	0
Sloboda Užice	2011–12	29	6	2	0	—		—		31	6
Sloboda Užice	2012–13	30	8	1	0	—		—		31	8
Sloboda Užice	2013–14	29	7	3	3	—		—		32	10
Sloboda Užice	Total	99	21	6	3	—		—		105	24
Sheriff Tiraspol	2014–15	23	1	3	0	5	0	—		31	1
Čukarički	2015–16	12	1	0	0	0	0	—		12	1
Čukarički	2016–17	1	0	0	0	0	0	—		1	0
Čukarički	Total	13	1	0	0	0	0	—		13	1
Borac Čačak	2016–17	30	5	2	1	0	0	—		32	6
Career total		165	28	11	4	5	0	—		181	32

== Honours ==
Pyunik

- Armenian Premier League: 2021–22

Sheriff Tiraspol

- Moldovan Cup: 2015
- Moldovan Super Cup: 2016
