= Fáider Burbano =

Colombian footballer (born 1992)

Personal information
- Date of birth: June 12, 1992 (age 34)
- Place of birth: Tumaco, Colombia
- Height: 1.70 m (5 ft 7 in)
- Position: Winger

Youth career
- Envigado

Senior career*
Years	Team	Apps	(Gls)
2009–2015	Envigado	124	(7)
2015–2016	Independiente Medellin	28	(3)
2017	Atlético Bucaramanga	17	(1)
2017–2018	Rionegro Águilas	10	(1)
2018–2019	Santa Fe	26	(2)
2018	→ Rampla Juniors (loan)	7	(1)
2020–2021	Botev Plovdiv	9	(0)
2021	Once Caldas	14	(0)
2021	Deportivo Pereira	9	(0)
2022	Águila	19	(2)
2022–2023	Alashkert	6	(0)
- * Club domestic league appearances and goals as of 15 February 2023

Fáider Fabio Burbano Castilla (born 12 June 1992) is a Colombian professional footballer who plays as a winger.

== Club career ==
Born in Tumaco, Colombia, Burbano started his career with the youth ranks of Colombian side Envigado. In 2009, he joined the first team as a 17-year-old. He plays primarily as a forward or winger.

During January 2011 Burbano joined Chicago Fire SC of Major League Soccer for a trial period.

On 27 June 2022, Armenian Premier League club Alashkert announced the signings of Burbano from Águila. On 28 January 2023, Alashkert announced the departure of Burbano.

== International career ==
Fabio Burbano has participated in various youth national teams for Colombia, including the Under-17 and Under-20 national team. He also was a member of the Colombian squad that finished fourth in the 2009 South American Under-17 Football Championship.
