= Aleksa Vidić =

Serbian footballer

Personal information
- Date of birth: 29 September 1994 (age 32)
- Place of birth: Užice, FR Yugoslavia
- Height: 1.84 m (6 ft 1/2 in)
- Positions: Centre-back; midfielder

Team information
- Current team: Shirak
- Number: 16

Youth career
- 2003–2013: Sloboda Užice

Senior career*
Years	Team	Apps	(Gls)
2013–2017	Sloboda Užice	71	(2)
2013–2014	→ Mačva Šabac (loan)	23	(1)
2018	Smolevichi	25	(0)
2019	Minsk	25	(0)
2020	Budućnost Podgorica	3	(0)
2020–2021	Zlatibor Čajetina	4	(0)
2021–2022	Radnički Sremska Mitrovica	30	(2)
2022–	Shirak Gyumri	116	(1)
- * Club domestic league appearances and goals as of 18 June 2026

Aleksa Vidić (Serbian Cyrillic: Алекса Видић; born 29 September 1994) is a Serbian professional footballer who plays as a defender for Shirak.

== Club career ==
From 2013 till 2017 he played for Sloboda Užice.

=== Career statistics ===
As of 18 December 2017

Club	Season	League		Cup		Continental		Total	
Club	Season	Apps	Goals	Apps	Goals	Apps	Goals	Apps	Goals
Sloboda	2012–13	0	0	0	0	0	0	0	0
Mačva (loan)	2013–14	23	1	0	0	0	0	23	1
Sloboda	2014–15	8	0	0	0	0	0	8	0
Sloboda	2015–16	27	1	1	0	0	0	28	1
Sloboda	2016–17	23	1	3	1	0	0	26	2
Sloboda	2017–18	13	0	1	0	0	0	14	0
Sloboda	Total	71	2	5	1	0	0	76	3
Career total		94	3	5	1	0	0	99	4
