= 2021–22 FC Pyunik season =

Pyunik
2021-22 season
- Chairman: Rafik Hayrapetyan
- Manager: Yegishe Melikyan
- Stadium: Republican Stadium
- Premier League: Champions
- Armenian Cup: Quarterfinals vs Van
- Top goalscorer: League: Hugo Firmino (16); All: Hugo Firmino (18)
Home colours	Away colours

The 2021–22 season was Pyunik's 28th season in the Armenian Premier League.

== Season events ==
On 14 June, Pyunik announced the signing of Aram Kocharyan from Lori, with Edgar Movsesyan joining from Van the next day.

Two days later, 17 June, Vaspurak Minasyan joined Pyunik from Alashkert, with Hayk Ishkhanyan signing from Shirak on 19 June.

On 21 June, Pyunik announced the signing of Yuri Gareginyan from Noah.

On 24 June, Pyunik announced the signing of Juninho on a free transfer after he'd left his previous club Paraná in February 2021.

On 29 June, Zoran Gajić joined Pyunik from Zbrojovka Brno.

On 10 July, Pyunik announced the signing of Grigor Meliksetyan from Ararat Yerevan, with Erik Vardanyan returning to the club on a season-long loan deal from Sochi the next day.

On 14 July, Gevorg Ghazaryan joined Pyunik from AEL Limassol.

On 18 July, Pyunik announced the signing of Hugo Firmino from Cova da Piedade.

On 1 August, Pyunik announced the signing of Adnan Šećerović from Riga.

On 17 August, Pyunik announced the signing of Bruno Nascimento from Al-Hidd.

On 27 August, Pyunik announced the signing of Nikita Baranov from Ħamrun Spartans.

On 31 August, Pyunik announced the signing of Carlitos from Doxa Katokopias.

On 9 September, Pyunik announced the signing of Lazar Jovanović from Mladost Lučani.

On 13 September, Hayk Ishkhanyan left Pyunik by mutual consent, before signing for BKMA Yerevan.

On 16 December, Pyunik announced the signing of Artak Dashyan from Atyrau.

On 20 December, Adnan Šećerović left Pyunik by mutual consent.

On 27 December, Pyunik announced that Sevak Aslanyan, Suren Harutyunyan and Lazar Jovanović had all left the club after their contracts where ended by mutual agreement.

On 17 January, Pyunik announced the signing of Thiago Galvão, with Uroš Nenadović joining from Taraz on 22 January and Eugeniu Cociuc from Zimbru Chișinău on 24 January.

On 27 January, Pyunik announced the signing of Serges Déblé who'd left Ararat Yerevan earlier in January.

On 1 February, Pyunik announced the signing of David Yurchenko from Alashkert.

On 3 February, Pyunik announced the signing of free agent Alexander González.

On 5 February, Pyunik announced the signing of Renzo Zambrano after he'd previously played for Portland Timbers.

On 16 February, Pyunik announced the signing of Gevorg Najaryan after he'd previously played for Shakhter Karagandy.

The following day, 17 February, Vaspurak Minasyan, Edgar Movsesyan and Vrezh Chiloyan all left the club on loan for the remainder of the season.

== Squad ==
As of match played 28 May 2022

Number	Name	Nationality	Position	Date of birth (age)	Signed from	Signed in	Contract ends	Apps.	Goals
Goalkeepers
1	David Yurchenko	(Armenia)	GK	27 March 1986 (aged 36)	Alashkert	2022		16	0
12	Grigor Meliksetyan	(Armenia)	GK	18 August 1986 (aged 35)	Ararat Yerevan	2021			
16	Vlad Chatunts	(Armenia)	GK	19 September 2002 (aged 19)	Academy	2019		0	0
71	Stanislav Buchnev	(Armenia)	GK	17 July 1990 (aged 31)	Fakel Voronezh	2020		37	0
Defenders
2	Serob Grigoryan	(Armenia)	DF	4 February 1995 (aged 27)	Krylia Sovetov	2016		135	1
3	Bruno Nascimento	(Brazil)	DF	30 May 1991 (aged 30)	Al-Hidd	2021		13	0
5	Zoran Gajić	(Serbia)	DF	18 May 1990 (aged 32)	Zbrojovka Brno	2021		25	1
6	Juninho	(Brazil)	DF	29 July 1995 (aged 26)	Unattached	2021		34	2
25	Magomed Musalov	(Russia)	DF	9 February 1994 (aged 28)	Akhmat Grozny	2020		19	0
27	Nikita Baranov	(Estonia)	DF	19 August 1992 (aged 29)	Ħamrun Spartans	2021		24	2
30	Alexander González	(Venezuela)	DF	13 September 1992 (aged 29)	Unattached	2022		14	0
95	Anton Bratkov	(Ukraine)	DF	14 May 1993 (aged 29)	Metalist 1925 Kharkiv	2021		39	0
96	Arman Hovhannisyan	(Armenia)	DF	7 July 1993 (aged 28)	Tobol	2021			
Midfielders
9	Artak Dashyan	(Armenia)	MF	20 November 1989 (aged 32)	Atyrau	2021		17	0
10	Gevorg Ghazaryan	(Armenia)	MF	5 April 1988 (aged 34)	AEL Limassol	2021			
11	Hovhannes Harutyunyan	(Armenia)	MF	25 May 1999 (aged 23)	Ararat-Armenia	2021		76	7
13	Gevorg Najaryan	(Kazakhstan)	MF	6 January 1998 (aged 24)	Unattached	2022		6	0
23	Aras Özbiliz	(Armenia)	MF	9 March 1990 (aged 32)	Beşiktaş	2019		18	5
26	Renzo Zambrano	(Venezuela)	MF	26 August 1994 (aged 27)	Unattached	2022		16	0
29	Eugeniu Cociuc	(Moldova)	MF	11 May 1993 (aged 29)	Zimbru Chișinău	2022		15	0
85	Karlen Hovhannisyan	(Armenia)	MF	26 April 2005 (aged 17)	Academy	2021		1	0
88	Yuri Gareginyan	(Armenia)	MF	3 February 1994 (aged 28)	Noah	2021		19	0
93	Higor	(Brazil)	MF	2 June 1993 (aged 28)	Botafogo	2021		23	2
Forwards
7	Hugo Firmino	(Portugal)	FW	22 December 1988 (aged 33)	Cova Piedade	2021		31	18
8	Serges Déblé	(Ivory Coast)	FW	1 October 1989 (aged 32)	Unattached	2022		16	8
17	Levon Vardanyan	(Armenia)	FW	2 November 2003 (aged 18)	Academy	2019	2025	23	0
20	Thiago Galvão	(Brazil)	FW	24 August 1989 (aged 32)	Unattached	2022		5	0
21	Carlitos	(Portugal)	FW	9 March 1993 (aged 29)	Doxa Katokopias	2021		12	0
31	Levon Petrosyan	(Armenia)	FW	24 March 2004 (aged 18)	Academy	2021		1	0
70	Uroš Nenadović	(Serbia)	FW	28 January 1994 (aged 28)	Taraz	2022		12	3
90	José Caraballo	(Venezuela)	FW	21 February 1996 (aged 26)	Huachipato	2021		45	11
Players away on loan
7	Erik Azizyan	(Armenia)	MF	4 March 2000 (aged 22)	Ararat-Armenia	2020	2023		
10	Artur Grigoryan	(Armenia)	MF	10 July 1993 (aged 28)	Gandzasar Kapan	2020			
19	Vaspurak Minasyan	(Armenia)	DF	29 June 1994 (aged 27)	Alashkert	2021			
22	Edgar Movsesyan	(Armenia)	FW	9 September 1998 (aged 23)	Van	2021		11	0
	Vrezh Chiloyan	(Armenia)	FW	6 April 2002 (aged 20)	Academy	2019		0	0
Players who left during the season
1	Sevak Aslanyan	(Armenia)	GK	17 May 1998 (aged 24)	Academy	2018		2	0
8	Aram Kocharyan	(Armenia)	DF	5 March 1996 (aged 26)	Lori	2021		6	0
9	Lazar Jovanović	(Serbia)	FW	13 July 1993 (aged 28)	Mladost Lučani	2021		5	0
14	Erik Vardanyan	(Armenia)	MF	7 June 1998 (aged 23)	loan from Sochi	2021	2021	81	16
18	Hayk Ishkhanyan	(Armenia)	DF	24 June 1989 (aged 32)	Shirak	2021		4	0
26	Adnan Šećerović	(Bosnia and Herzegovina)	MF	1 December 1991 (aged 30)	Riga	2021		15	0
39	Suren Harutyunyan	(Armenia)	DF	1 November 2000 (aged 21)	Academy	2021		0	0
70	José Balza	(Venezuela)	FW	15 June 1997 (aged 24)	loan from Deportivo La Guaira	2021		11	1
80	Rommell Ibarra	(Venezuela)	MF	24 March 2000 (aged 22)	loan from Deportivo La Guaira	2021		8	0

=== Out on loan ===
Note: Flags indicate national team as defined under FIFA eligibility rules; some limited exceptions apply. Players may hold more than one non-FIFA nationality.

No.	Pos.	Nation	Player
7	MF	ARM	Erik Azizyan (at Van)
10	MF	ARM	Artur Grigoryan (at BKMA Yerevan)
19	DF	ARM	Vaspurak Minasyan (at Van)
22	MF	ARM	Edgar Movsesyan (at BKMA Yerevan)
—	FW	ARM	Vrezh Chiloyan (at Gandzasar Kapan)

== Transfers ==
=== In ===
Date	Position	Nationality	Name	From	Fee	Ref.
14 June 2021	DF	(Armenia)	Aram Kocharyan	Lori	Free	
15 June 2021	FW	(Armenia)	Edgar Movsesyan	Van	Undisclosed	
17 June 2021	DF	(Armenia)	Vaspurak Minasyan	Alashkert	Undisclosed	
19 June 2021	DF	(Armenia)	Hayk Ishkhanyan	Shirak	Undisclosed	
21 June 2021	MF	(Armenia)	Yuri Gareginyan	Noah	Undisclosed	
24 June 2021	DF	(Brazil)	Juninho	Unattached	Free	
29 June 2021	DF	(Serbia)	Zoran Gajić	Zbrojovka Brno	Undisclosed	
9 July 2021	GK	(Armenia)	Grigor Meliksetyan	Ararat Yerevan	Undisclosed	
14 July 2021	MF	(Armenia)	Gevorg Ghazaryan	AEL Limassol	Undisclosed	
18 July 2021	FW	(Portugal)	Hugo Firmino	Cova da Piedade	Undisclosed	
1 August 2021	MF	(Bosnia and Herzegovina)	Adnan Šećerović	Riga	Undisclosed	
17 August 2021	DF	(Brazil)	Bruno Nascimento	Al-Hidd	Undisclosed	
27 August 2021	DF	(Estonia)	Nikita Baranov	Ħamrun Spartans	Undisclosed	
31 August 2021	FW	(Portugal)	Carlitos	Doxa Katokopias	Undisclosed	
9 September 2021	FW	(Serbia)	Lazar Jovanović	Mladost Lučani	Undisclosed	
16 December 2021	MF	(Armenia)	Artak Dashyan	Atyrau	Free	
17 January 2022	FW	(Brazil)	Thiago Galvão	Unattached	Free	
22 January 2022	FW	(Serbia)	Uroš Nenadović	Taraz	Undisclosed	
24 January 2022	MF	(Moldova)	Eugeniu Cociuc	Zimbru Chișinău	Undisclosed	
27 January 2022	FW	(Ivory Coast)	Serges Déblé	Unattached	Free	
1 February 2022	GK	(Armenia)	David Yurchenko	Alashkert	Undisclosed	
3 February 2022	DF	(Venezuela)	Alexander González	Unattached	Free	
5 February 2022	MF	(Venezuela)	Renzo Zambrano	Unattached	Free	
16 February 2022	MF	(Kazakhstan)	Gevorg Najaryan	Unattached	Free	

=== Loans in ===
Date from	Position	Nationality	Name	From	Date to	Ref.
10 July 2021	MF	(Armenia)	Erik Vardanyan	Sochi	11 January 2022	

=== Out ===
Date	Position	Nationality	Name	To	Fee	Ref.
7 July 2021	MF	(Armenia)	Tigran Sargsyan	Noah	Undisclosed	
9 August 2021	DF	(Armenia)	Erik Avetisyan	Noah	Undisclosed	
4 February 2022	FW	(Armenia)	Alexander Ter-Tovmasyan	Alashkert	Undisclosed	

=== Loans out ===
Date from	Position	Nationality	Name	To	Date to	Ref.
28 June 2021	MF	(Armenia)	Erik Azizyan	Van	End of season	
19 August 2021	MF	(Armenia)	Artur Grigoryan	BKMA Yerevan	End of season	
17 February 2022	DF	(Armenia)	Vaspurak Minasyan	Van	End of season	
17 February 2022	FW	(Armenia)	Edgar Movsesyan	BKMA Yerevan	End of season	
17 February 2022	FW	(Armenia)	Vrezh Chiloyan	Gandzasar Kapan	End of season	

=== Released ===
Date	Position	Nationality	Name	Joined	Date	Ref.
1 June 2021	GK	(Ukraine)	Herman Penkov	Mynai		
1 June 2021	DF	(Armenia)	Robert Darbinyan	Ararat Yerevan		
1 June 2021	DF	(Ukraine)	Valeriy Boldenkov	Karpaty Lviv		
1 June 2021	MF	(Armenia)	Norayr Ghazaryan	Ararat-Armenia II		
1 June 2021	MF	(Armenia)	Gor Malakyan	Ararat Yerevan		
1 June 2021	MF	(Nigeria)	Julius Ufuoma	Noravank	25 July 2021	
1 June 2021	FW	(Ukraine)	Yevhen Budnik	Karpaty Lviv		
4 June 2021	FW	(Ukraine)	Oleh Kozhushko	Oleksandriya	27 June 2021	
10 June 2021	DF	(Armenia)	Artur Kartashyan	Sevan		
13 June 2021	DF	(Ukraine)	Ihor Honchar	Mynai		
13 June 2021	FW	(Ukraine)	Mykyta Tatarkov	Kryvbas Kryvyi Rih		
15 June 2021	MF	(Armenia)	Alik Arakelyan	Ararat Yerevan		
30 June 2021	MF	(Burkina Faso)	Dramane Salou	Salitas	20 August 2021	
13 September 2021	DF	(Armenia)	Hayk Ishkhanyan	BKMA Yerevan	13 September 2021	
6 December 2021	MF	(Venezuela)	Rommell Ibarra			
6 December 2021	FW	(Venezuela)	José Balza	Carabobo		
20 December 2021	MF	(Bosnia and Herzegovina)	Adnan Šećerović	Sarajevo		
27 December 2021	GK	(Armenia)	Sevak Aslanyan	Alashkert	20 February 2022	
27 December 2021	DF	(Armenia)	Suren Harutyunyan			
27 December 2021	FW	(Serbia)	Lazar Jovanović	Radnički Niš	8 February 2022	
11 January 2022	DF	(Armenia)	Aram Kocharyan	Noravank	28 January 2022	
30 May 2022	DF	(Armenia)	Arman Hovhannisyan	Ararat-Armenia	9 June 2022	
31 May 2022	MF	(Armenia)	Gevorg Ghazaryan	Ararat-Armenia	8 June 2022	
1 June 2022	GK	(Armenia)	Grigor Meliksetyan			
1 June 2022	DF	(Brazil)	Bruno Nascimento			
1 June 2022	DF	(Russia)	Magomed Musalov	SKA-Khabarovsk	16 July 2022	
1 June 2022	MF	(Brazil)	Higor Leite			
1 June 2022	FW	(Portugal)	Carlitos	Chania	1 October 2022	
3 June 2022	DF	(Armenia)	Serob Grigoryan	BKMA Yerevan	11 July 2022	

== Friendlies ==
26 January 2022	Pyunik (Armenia)	1–1	(Russia) Ural Yekaterinburg	Sharjah, United Arab Emirates
17:00 (UTC+4)	Harutyunyan	Report	Augustyniak (pen.)

29 January 2022	Al Ain (United Arab Emirates)	1–2	(Armenia) Pyunik	Al Ain, United Arab Emirates
17:00 (UTC+4)		Report

3 February 2022	Al-Fayha (Saudi Arabia)	0–0	(Armenia) Pyunik	Dubai, United Arab Emirates
(UTC+4)		Report

11 February 2022	Pyunik (Armenia)	1–1	(Russia) Spartak Moscow	Dubai, United Arab Emirates
17:00 (UTC+4)	Firmino	Report	Dzhikiya

== Competitions ==
=== Overall record ===
Competition	First match	Last match	Starting round	Final position	Record							
Competition	First match	Last match	Starting round	Final position	Pld	W	D	L	GF	GA	GD	Win %
Premier League	30 July 2021	28 May 2022	Matchday 1	Winners	32	23	6	3	52	25	+27	71.88
Armenian Cup	17 September 2021	23 November 2021	First round	Quarterfinal	2	1	1	0	3	2	+1	50.00
Total					34	24	7	3	55	27	+28	70.59

Last updated: 28 May 2022
Source: Competitions

=== Premier League ===
==== Results summary ====
Overall								Home						Away					
Pld	W	D	L	GF	GA	GD	Pts	W	D	L	GF	GA	GD	W	D	L	GF	GA	GD
32	23	6	3	52	25	+27	75	11	3	2	24	15	+9	12	3	1	28	10	+18

Last updated: 28 May 2022.
Source: See Results

==== Results by round ====
Round	1	2	3	4	5	6	7	8	9	10	11	12	13	14	15	16	17	18	19	20	21	22	23	24	25	26	27	28	29	30	31	32	33	34	35
Ground	A	A	H	A	H	A	H	A	H	A	H	A	H	A	H	A (Note: Between matchday 15 and 16, Sevan were expelled from the league.)	H	A	H	A	H	A	A	A	H	A	H	H	H	A	H	H	H	H	A
Result	W	L	L	W	D	W	V	W	D	W	W	W	W	W	W	V	L	W	W	W	W	W	D	W	P	W	W	W	W	D	W	W	D	W	D
Position	2	4	5	5	5	4	4	4	3	3	3	2	2	2	2	2	2	2	2	2	2	2	2	2	2	2	2	1	1	1	1	1	1	1	1

Updated to match(es) played on 28 May 2022. Source: See Results
A = Away; H = Home; W = Win; D = Draw; L = Loss; P = Postponed; V = Void

==== Results ====
30 July 2021 1	BKMA Yerevan	0–4	Pyunik	Yerevan
19:00 (UTC+4)	N.Alaverdyan (yellow card) 31'; E.Piloyan (yellow card) 59'; A.Khamoyan (yellow card) 63'	Report	E.Movsesyan 39'; Bratkov (yellow card) 54'; Caraballo 61'; Juninho 64'; Ghazaryan 73' (yellow card) 79'	Stadium: FFA Academy Stadium; Attendance: 800; Referee: Artem Gasparyan

6 August 2021 2	Noravank	2–1	Pyunik	Charentsavan
17:00 (UTC+4)	B.Techie 26' (yellow card) 45+3'; K.Nalbandyan (yellow card) 67'; D.Quaye (yellow card) 86'; S.Obonde (yellow card) 87' (goal) 90+2'	Report	Harutyunyan 45+9'	Stadium: Charentsavan City Stadium; Attendance: 500; Referee: Ashot Ghaltakchyan
Note: Match played at the Charentsavan City Stadium in Charentsavan, instead of Noravank's regular Arevik Stadium in Vayk due to renovation work.

15 August 2021 3	Pyunik	0–3	Ararat-Armenia	Yerevan
19:00 (UTC+4)	Musalov (yellow card) 52'; Buchnev (yellow card) 84'	Report	Otubanjo 22', 45'; Terteryan (yellow card) 41'; Alemão (yellow card) 48'; Vakulenko (yellow card) 49'; A.Tera 71'	Stadium: FFA Academy Stadium; Attendance: 800; Referee: Zaven Hovhannisyan
Note: Match played at the FFA Academy Stadium in Yerevan, instead of Pyunik's regular Republican Stadium in Yerevan.

20 August 2021 4	Noah	1–2	Pyunik	Yerevan
19:00 (UTC+4)	Karapetyan 35'; Hovhannisyan (yellow card) 67'; Harutyunyan (yellow card) 90+4'	Report	Caraballo 23'; Vardanyan (yellow card) 45'; Harutyunyan 83'; Firmino (yellow card) 90+4'	Stadium: FFA Academy Stadium; Attendance: 700; Referee: Ashot Ghaltakchyan

24 August 2021 5	Pyunik	1–1	Van	Yerevan
19:00 (UTC+4)	E.Vardanyan 17'; S.Grigoryan (yellow card) 61'; Gareginyan (yellow card) 84'; Bratkov (yellow card) 90+2'	Report	Badoyan 10'	Stadium: Republican Stadium; Attendance: 600; Referee: Artur Safaryan

11 September 2021 6	Urartu	0–2	Pyunik	Yerevan
20:00 (UTC+4)	Désiré (yellow card) 4'; N.Grigoryan (yellow card) 32'; E.Grigoryan (yellow card) 36'; U.Iwu (yellow card) 67'	Report	Vardanyan 42'; Firmino 52'	Stadium: Urartu Stadium; Attendance: 400; Referee: Vardan Manukyan

23 September 2021 7	Pyunik	v	Sevan	Yerevan
18:00 (UTC+4)	Šećerović (yellow card) 27'; Firmino (yellow card) 75'	Report	Claudir (yellow card) 36'; Bissainthe (yellow card) 45'; Danielyan (yellow card) 75'; Duranski (yellow card) 80'; I.Abubakar (yellow card) 83'	Stadium: Republican Stadium; Attendance: 100; Referee: Artem Gasparyan
Note: Match declared void on 1 December 2021.

27 September 2021 8	Ararat Yerevan	0–1	Pyunik	Yerevan
20:00 (UTC+4)	E.Malakyan (yellow card) 15'	Report	Caraballo 26'; Harutyunyan (yellow card) 47'; Musalov (yellow card) 72'; Carlitos (yellow card) 79'; Buchnev (yellow card) 84'; Gajić (yellow card) 86'; E.Movsesyan (yellow card) 90+2'	Stadium: Republican Stadium; Attendance: 800; Referee: Zaven Hovhannisyan

15 October 2021 9	Pyunik	1–1	Alashkert	Yerevan
19:00 (UTC+4)	E.Vardanyan 32' (pen.) (yellow card) 78'; Hovhannisyan (yellow card) 84'; Buchnev (yellow card) 90'	Report	Grigoryan (yellow card) 38'; Glišić (yellow card) 44'; Kryuchkov (yellow card) 69'; Khurtsidze (yellow card) 73'; Voskanyan 90'	Stadium: Republican Stadium; Attendance: 1,000; Referee: Artem Gasparyan

21 October 2021 10	BKMA Yerevan	0–1	Pyunik	Yerevan
18:00 (UTC+4)		Report	E.Vardanyan (yellow card) 71'; Harutyunyan 85'	Stadium: Yerevan Football Academy Stadium; Referee: Artur Tavakalyan

27 October 2021 11	Pyunik	2–0	Noravank	Yerevan
19:00 (UTC+4)	D.Cubrakovic 12' (o.g.); Firmino (yellow card) 50' (goal) 60'	Report	J.Ufuoma (yellow card) 48'	Stadium: Republican Stadium; Attendance: 800; Referee: Shahen Aghayan

1 November 2021 12	Ararat-Armenia	1–2	Pyunik	Yerevan
18:00 (UTC+4)	A.Tera (yellow card) 83'; Lima 90'	Report	Caraballo 19'; Šećerović (yellow card) 28'; Musalov (yellow card) 45'; Harutyunyan 57'; Hovhannisyan (yellow card) 69'; Bruno (red card) 72'; Buchnev (yellow card) 80'; Grigoryan (yellow card) 87'	Stadium: FFA Academy Stadium; Referee: Henrik Nalbandyan

5 November 2021 13	Pyunik	1–0	Noah	Yerevan
18:00 (UTC+4)	Firmino 53' (pen.); Buchnev (yellow card) 90'	Report	Monroy (yellow card) 15'; S.Shahinyan (yellow card) 29'; I.Smirnov (yellow card) 53'; Dedechko (yellow card) 77'	Stadium: Republican Stadium; Attendance: 1,000; Referee: Ashot Ghaltakchyan

19 November 2021 14	Van	0–2	Pyunik	Charentsavan
14:00 (UTC+4)	A.Meliksetyan (yellow card) 5'; Batyrkanov (yellow card) 87'	Report	Firmino 6'; Šećerović (yellow card) 10'; Caraballo 32'; Bruno (yellow card) 85'; Meliksetyan (yellow card) 90+4'	Stadium: Charentsavan City Stadium; Attendance: 300; Referee: Ashot Ghaltakchyan

28 November 2021 15	Pyunik	2–0	Urartu	Yerevan
18:00 (UTC+4)	Baranov 15' (yellow card) 82'; Gajić (yellow card) 50'; Caraballo (yellow card) 59'; Ghazaryan 68'	Report	Ten (yellow card) 34'; N.Grigoryan (yellow card) 51'; Désiré (yellow card) 84'; Paramonov (yellow card) 90+1'	Stadium: Republican Stadium; Attendance: 200; Referee: Artem Gasparyan

3 December 2021 16	Sevan	Bye	Pyunik	Yerevan
14:00 (UTC+4)				Stadium: Alashkert Stadium
Note: Sevan expelled from the league on 1 December 2021.

11 December 2021 17	Pyunik	2–6	Ararat Yerevan	Yerevan
17:00 (UTC+4)	Firmino 23', 88' (pen.); Baranov (yellow card) 63'; Harutyunyan (yellow card) 66'	Report	G.Malakyan (yellow card) 6'; Déblé 11', 14', 22'; J.Bravo (yellow card) 27'; D.Pobulić 47', 70'; Arakelyan 66'; R.Hakobyan (yellow card) 90+2'	Stadium: Republican Stadium; Attendance: 250; Referee: Henrik Nalbandyan

21 February 2022 18	Alashkert	1–4	Pyunik	Yerevan
14:00 (UTC+4)	Embaló 53'; Fofana (yellow card) 89'	Report	González (yellow card) 11'; Déblé 45+1', 59', 60'; Cociuc (yellow card) 45+3'; Gajić 66'	Stadium: Urartu-3 Stadium; Referee: Shahen Aghayan

26 February 2022 19	Pyunik	1–0	BKMA Yerevan	Yerevan
14:00 (UTC+4)	Firmino 73'	Report	Ishkhanyan (yellow card) 45+1'; A.Khamoyan (yellow card) 48'; G.Petrosyan (yellow card) 64'; A.Galstyan (yellow card) 66'; S.Mkrtchyan (yellow card) 71'; A.Nahapetyan (yellow card) 83'; E.Simonyan (yellow card) 90+5'	Stadium: Republican Stadium; Referee: Shahen Aghayan

2 March 2022 20	Noravank	1–2	Pyunik	Vayk
14:00 (UTC+4)	Bashilov (yellow card) 51'; Kobzar 62' (pen.); Mustafin (yellow card) 79'; H.Avagyan (yellow card) 86'	Report	Firmino 33', 89' (yellow card) 90'; Yurchenko (yellow card) 90+5'	Stadium: Arevik Stadium

6 March 2022 21	Pyunik	1–0	Ararat-Armenia	Yerevan
17:00 (UTC+4)	Bratkov (yellow card) 8'; Firmino 51'; Dashyan (yellow card) 70'	Report	Lima (yellow card) 8'; Bueno (yellow card) 56'; Udo (yellow card) 90+7'	Stadium: FFA Academy Stadium; Referee: Zaven Hovhannisyan

10 March 2022 22	Noah	0–1	Pyunik	Armavir
15:00 (UTC+4)	Oancea (yellow card) 63'	Report	Déblé 27'; Yurchenko (yellow card) 87'; Hovhannisyan (yellow card) 88'	Stadium: Armavir City Stadium; Referee: Artem Gasparyan

16 March 2022 23	Van	1–1	Pyunik	Charentsavan
14:00 (UTC+4)	A.Petrosyan (penalty missed) 57'; J.Gaba 69' (yellow card) 77'	Report	Zambrano (yellow card) 16'; Déblé (yellow card) 31' (yellow-red card) 58'; Firmino 90+4'	Stadium: Charentsavan City Stadium; Referee: Shahen Aghayan

20 March 2022 24	Urartu	0–1	Pyunik	Yerevan
16:30 (UTC+4)		Report	Hovhannisyan (yellow card) 63'; Najaryan (yellow card) 80'; Juninho 90+4'	Stadium: Urartu Stadium; Referee: Zaven Hovhannisyan

4 April 2022 25	Pyunik	v	Sevan	Yerevan
(UTC+4)				Stadium: Republican Stadium
Note: Sevan expelled from the league on 1 December 2021.

11 April 2022 26	Ararat Yerevan	1–2	Pyunik	Yerevan
18:00 (UTC+4)	Aliyu 52'; Darbinyan (red card) 85'	Report	Caraballo 12'; Bratkov (yellow card) 38'; Déblé 73'; Nenadović (yellow card) 75'	Stadium: Republican Stadium; Referee: Artem Gasparyan

15 April 2022 27	Pyunik	3–0	Alashkert	Yerevan
18:00 (UTC+4)	Harutyunyan (yellow card) 27'; Cociuc (yellow card) 29'; Firmino 35'; Ghazaryan 55'; Déblé 65' Yurchenko (yellow card) 83'	Report	Guz (yellow card) 8'; Daghbashyan (yellow card) 50'; Embaló (yellow card) 58'	Stadium: Republican Stadium; Referee: Henrik Nalbandyan

20 April 2022 28	Pyunik	1–0	BKMA Yerevan	Yerevan
19:00 (UTC+4)	Firmino 24'	Report	D.Aghbalyan (yellow card) 38'; S.Mkrtchyan (yellow card) 89'	Stadium: Republican Stadium; Referee: Shahen Aghayan

25 April 2022 29	Pyunik	3–2	Noravank	Yerevan
19:00 (UTC+4)	Nenadović 46' (yellow card) 90+6'; Hovhannisyan (yellow card) 49'; Firmino 60'; Déblé 67'; González (yellow card) 79'	Report	Ar.Kocharyan (yellow card) 13'; Bashilov (yellow card) 15'; N.Nikoghosyan 42'; Yenne 80'	Stadium: Republican Stadium; Referee: Ashot Ghaltakchyan

29 April 2022 30	Ararat-Armenia	1–1	Pyunik	Yerevan
20:00 (UTC+4)	Wbeymar (yellow card) 47'; Narsingh 82'; J.Duarte (yellow card) 90+2'	Report	González (yellow card) 54'; Firmino 63'	Stadium: FFA Academy Stadium; Referee: Henrik Nalbandyan

5 May 2022 31	Pyunik	2–1	Noah	Yerevan
19:30 (UTC+4)	Nenadović 20'; Hovhannisyan (yellow card) 57'; Caraballo 76'	Report	Grjaznovs (yellow card) 77'; Mayrovich 84' (pen.)	Stadium: Republican Stadium; Referee: Zaven Hovhannisyan

9 May 2022 32	Pyunik	2–0	Van	Yerevan
16:00 (UTC+4)	Caraballo 18'; Firmino 41'; Najaryan (yellow card) 77'	Report		Stadium: Republican Stadium; Referee: Vardan Manukyan

15 May 2022 33	Pyunik	1–1	Urartu	Yerevan
19:00 (UTC+4)	Baranov 35'	Report	U.Iwu 20'; Vardanyan (yellow card) 37'; E.Grigoryan (yellow card) 87'	Stadium: Republican Stadium; Referee: Artem Gasparyan

20-22 May 2022 34	Sevan	v	Pyunik	Yerevan
(UTC+4)				Stadium: Alashkert Stadium
Note: Sevan expelled from the league on 1 December 2021.

24 May 2022 35	Pyunik	1–0	Ararat Yerevan	Yerevan
19:15 (UTC+4)	Déblé 30'; Harutyunyan (yellow card) 36'; González (yellow card) 58'; Firmino (yellow card) 89'	Report	G.Malakyan (yellow card) 90+4'; Mkoyan (yellow card) 90+6'	Stadium: Republican Stadium; Referee: Artem Gasparyan

28 May 2022 36	Alashkert	1–1	Pyunik	Yerevan
14:00 (UTC+4)	T.Voskanyan (yellow card) 35'; Grigoryan (yellow card) 42'; K.Manukyan 61'; Daghbashyan (yellow card) 88'	Report	Nenadović 6'; Higor (yellow card) 86'	Stadium: Alashkert Stadium; Referee: Sargis Khachatryan

==== Table ====
Pos	Team	Pld	W	D	L	GF	GA	GD	Pts	Qualification or relegation
1	Pyunik (C)	32	23	6	3	52	25	+27	75	Qualification for the Champions League first qualifying round
2	Ararat-Armenia	32	23	5	4	56	20	+36	74	Qualification for the Europa Conference League second qualifying round (Note: The 2021–22 Armenian Cup winners, Noravank, did not obtain an UEFA license and was replaced.)
3	Alashkert	32	14	9	9	38	30	+8	51	Qualification for the Europa Conference League first qualifying round
4	Ararat Yerevan	32	13	7	12	47	36	+11	46	Qualification for the Europa Conference League first qualifying round
5	Urartu	32	9	13	10	37	32	+5	40	
6	Noah	32	9	12	11	38	43	−5	39	
7	Noravank	32	7	7	18	36	55	−19	28	
8	Van	32	6	7	19	19	47	−28	25	
9	BKMA (O)	32	4	6	22	25	60	−35	18	Qualification to the relegation play-offs
10	Sevan (D, R)	0	0	0	0	0	0	0	0	Relegation to the Armenian First League (Note: Sevan was expelled from the league on 1 December 2021.)

Source: FFA Soccerway
Rules for classification: 1) Points; 2) Head-to-head points; 3) Head-to-head goal difference; 4) Head-to-head goals scored; 5) Matches won; 6) Goal difference; 7) Less red cards; 8) Less yellow cards; 9) Fair-play ranking 10) Draw
(C) Champions; (D) Disqualified; (O) Play-off winners; (R) Relegated

=== Armenian Cup ===
17 September 2021 First Round	BKMA Yerevan	1–2	Pyunik	Yerevan
19:30 (UTC+4)	P.Manukyan (yellow card) 41'; A.Serobyan 52'; Ishkhanyan (yellow card) 85'	Report	Bratkov (yellow card) 39'; Firmino 65', 90'	Stadium: FFA Academy Stadium; Attendance: 350; Referee: Artem Gasparyan

23 November 2021 Quarterfinal	Pyunik	1–1 (a.e.t.) (2–4 p)	Van	Yerevan
18:00 (UTC+4)	Gareginyan (yellow card) 14'; Carlitos (yellow card) 99'; Stepanov 101' (o.g.)	Report	Stepanov (yellow card) 36' (goal) 117'; S.Adjouman (yellow card) 49'; A.Petrosyan (yellow card) 80'	Stadium: Republican Stadium; Attendance: 300; Referee: Zaven Hovhannisyan
	Penalties
	Harutyunyan (penalty scored); Caraballo (penalty missed); J.Balza (penalty missed); Bruno.N (penalty scored)		Bruno.M (penalty scored); A.Jindoyan (penalty scored); E.Azizyan (penalty scored); Batyrkanov (penalty scored)

== Statistics ==
As of match played 28 May 2022

=== Appearances and goals ===
No.	Pos	Nat	Player	Total		Premier League		Armenian Cup	
No.	Pos	Nat	Player	Apps	Goals	Apps	Goals	Apps	Goals
1	GK	(Armenia) ARM	David Yurchenko	16	0	16	0	0	0
2	DF	(Armenia) ARM	Serob Grigoryan	14	0	9+4	0	0+1	0
3	DF	(Brazil) BRA	Bruno Nascimento	13	0	9+2	0	2	0
5	DF	(Serbia) SRB	Zoran Gajić	25	1	16+9	1	0	0
6	DF	(Brazil) BRA	Juninho	32	2	23+7	2	2	0
7	FW	(Portugal) POR	Hugo Firmino	31	18	25+4	16	2	2
8	FW	(Ivory Coast) CIV	Serges Déblé	16	8	13+3	8	0	0
9	MF	(Armenia) ARM	Artak Dashyan	17	0	9+8	0	0	0
10	MF	(Armenia) ARM	Gevorg Ghazaryan	17	3	11+5	3	1	0
11	MF	(Armenia) ARM	Hovhannes Harutyunyan	33	4	20+11	4	2	0
12	GK	(Armenia) ARM	Grigor Meliksetyan	1	0	1	0	0	0
13	MF	(Kazakhstan) KAZ	Gevorg Najaryan	6	0	1+5	0	0	0
17	FW	(Armenia) ARM	Levon Vardanyan	6	0	0+6	0	0	0
19	DF	(Armenia) ARM	Vaspurak Minasyan	2	0	0+2	0	0	0
20	FW	(Brazil) BRA	Thiago Galvão	5	0	1+4	0	0	0
21	FW	(Portugal) POR	Carlitos	12	0	4+6	0	1+1	0
22	FW	(Armenia) ARM	Edgar Movsesyan	11	1	4+6	1	0+1	0
25	DF	(Russia) RUS	Magomed Musalov	14	0	10+3	0	0+1	0
26	MF	(Venezuela) VEN	Renzo Zambrano	16	0	11+5	0	0	0
27	DF	(Estonia) EST	Nikita Baranov	24	2	21+1	2	2	0
29	MF	(Moldova) MDA	Eugeniu Cociuc	15	0	10+5	0	0	0
30	DF	(Venezuela) VEN	Alexander González	14	0	14	0	0	0
31	FW	(Armenia) ARM	Levon Petrosyan	2	0	0+2	0	0	0
70	FW	(Serbia) SRB	Uroš Nenadović	12	3	4+8	3	0	0
71	GK	(Armenia) ARM	Stanislav Buchnev	17	0	15	0	2	0
85	FW	(Armenia) ARM	Karlen Hovhannisyan	1	0	0+1	0	0	0
88	MF	(Armenia) ARM	Yuri Gareginyan	18	0	5+12	0	0+1	0
90	FW	(Venezuela) VEN	José Caraballo	33	8	23+8	8	1+1	0
93	MF	(Brazil) BRA	Higor	14	0	4+8	0	1+1	0
95	DF	(Ukraine) UKR	Anton Bratkov	29	0	26+1	0	2	0
96	DF	(Armenia) ARM	Arman Hovhannisyan	20	0	17+3	0	0	0
Players away on loan:
Players who left Pyunik during the season:
8	DF	(Armenia) ARM	Aram Kocharyan	6	0	1+4	0	1	0
9	FW	(Serbia) SRB	Lazar Jovanović	5	0	0+4	0	1	0
14	MF	(Armenia) ARM	Erik Vardanyan	12	3	9+2	3	0+1	0
18	DF	(Armenia) ARM	Hayk Ishkhanyan	4	0	4	0	0	0
26	MF	(Bosnia and Herzegovina) BIH	Adnan Šećerović	15	0	13+1	0	1	0
70	FW	(Venezuela) VEN	José Balza	6	0	2+3	0	0+1	0
80	DF	(Venezuela) VEN	Rommell Ibarra	2	0	1+1	0	0	0

=== Goal scorers ===
Place	Position	Nation	Number	Name	Premier League	Armenian Cup	Total
1	FW	(Portugal)	7	Hugo Firmino	16	2	18
2	FW	(Venezuela)	90	José Caraballo	8	0	8
2	FW	(Ivory Coast)	8	Serges Déblé	8	0	8
4	MF	(Armenia)	11	Hovhannes Harutyunyan	4	0	4
5	MF	(Armenia)	14	Erik Vardanyan	3	0	3
5	FW	(Armenia)	10	Gevorg Ghazaryan	3	0	3
5	DF	(Serbia)	70	Uroš Nenadović	3	0	3
8	DF	(Brazil)	6	Juninho	2	0	2
8	DF	(Estonia)	27	Nikita Baranov	2	0	2
8				Own goal	1	1	2
11	FW	(Armenia)	22	Edgar Movsesyan	1	0	1
11	DF	(Serbia)	5	Zoran Gajić	1	0	1
				TOTALS	52	3	55

=== Clean sheets ===
Place	Position	Nation	Number	Name	Premier League	Armenian Cup	Total
1	GK	(Armenia)	1	David Yurchenko	8	0	8
2	GK	(Armenia)	71	Stanislav Buchnev	7	0	7
3	GK	(Armenia)	12	Grigor Meliksetyan	1	0	1
				TOTALS	16	0	16

=== Disciplinary record ===
Number	Nation	Position	Name	Premier League		Armenian Cup		Total	
Number	Nation	Position	Name	Yellow card	Red card	Yellow card	Red card	Yellow card	Red card
1	(Armenia)	GK	David Yurchenko	3	0	0	0	3	0
2	(Armenia)	DF	Serob Grigoryan	2	0	0	0	2	0
3	(Brazil)	DF	Bruno Nascimento	1	1	0	0	1	1
5	(Serbia)	DF	Zoran Gajić	2	0	0	0	2	0
7	(Portugal)	FW	Hugo Firmino	4	0	0	0	4	0
8	(Ivory Coast)	FW	Serges Déblé	2	1	0	0	2	1
9	(Armenia)	MF	Artak Dashyan	1	0	0	0	1	0
10	(Armenia)	MF	Gevorg Ghazaryan	1	0	0	0	1	0
11	(Armenia)	MF	Hovhannes Harutyunyan	4	0	0	0	4	0
12	(Armenia)	GK	Grigor Meliksetyan	1	0	0	0	1	0
13	(Kazakhstan)	MF	Gevorg Najaryan	2	0	0	0	2	0
21	(Portugal)	FW	Carlitos	1	0	1	0	2	0
22	(Armenia)	FW	Edgar Movsesyan	1	0	0	0	1	0
25	(Russia)	DF	Magomed Musalov	3	0	0	0	3	0
26	(Venezuela)	MF	Renzo Zambrano	1	0	0	0	1	0
27	(Estonia)	DF	Nikita Baranov	2	0	0	0	2	0
29	(Moldova)	MF	Eugeniu Cociuc	2	0	0	0	2	0
30	(Venezuela)	DF	Alexander González	4	0	0	0	4	0
70	(Serbia)	MF	Uroš Nenadović	2	0	0	0	2	0
71	(Armenia)	GK	Stanislav Buchnev	5	0	0	0	5	0
88	(Armenia)	MF	Yuri Gareginyan	1	0	1	0	2	0
90	(Venezuela)	FW	José Caraballo	1	0	0	0	1	0
93	(Brazil)	MF	Higor	1	0	0	0	1	0
95	(Ukraine)	DF	Anton Bratkov	4	0	1	0	5	0
96	(Armenia)	DF	Arman Hovhannisyan	6	0	0	0	6	0
Players away on loan:
Players who left Pyunik during the season:
14	(Armenia)	MF	Erik Vardanyan	3	0	0	0	3	0
26	(Bosnia and Herzegovina)	MF	Adnan Šećerović	2	0	0	0	2	0
			TOTALS	62	2	3	0	65	2
