= Alex Gonzalez =

Alex Gonzalez, Alex González, Álex González or Alexander Gonzalez may refer to:

- Alex Gonzalez (pitcher) (born 1992), American baseball pitcher known as Chi Chi
- Alex Gonzalez (shortstop, born 1973), American baseball player
- Alexander Gonzalez (businessman) (born 1945), former president of California State University, Sacramento and California State University, San Marcos
- Alexandre Gonzalez (born 1951), French long-distance runner
- Alexander González (cyclist) (born 1979), Colombian cyclist
- Alexander González (footballer, born 1992), Venezuelan footballer
- Alexander González (footballer, born 1994), Panamanian footballer
- Alex González (musician) (born 1969), American musician
- Álex González (actor) (born 1980), Spanish actor
- Alex González (boxer) (born 1974), Puerto Rican boxer
- Álex González (shortstop, born 1977), Venezuelan baseball player
- Alex Gonzalez (investor), American investor
