= Matthew Armstrong =

Mat, Matt, or Matthew Armstrong may refer to:

- Matthew Armstrong (Australian footballer) (born 1967), Australian rules football player
- Matthew Armstrong (English footballer) (1919–1941), English footballer
- Matt Armstrong (1911–1995), Scottish footballer
- Matthew John Armstrong (born 1973), American actor
- Matthew Armstrong, designer of the 2009 video game Borderlands
- Mat Armstrong (YouTuber) (born 1993), British automotive content creator
