= José Caraballo (footballer) =

Venezuelan footballer (born 1996)

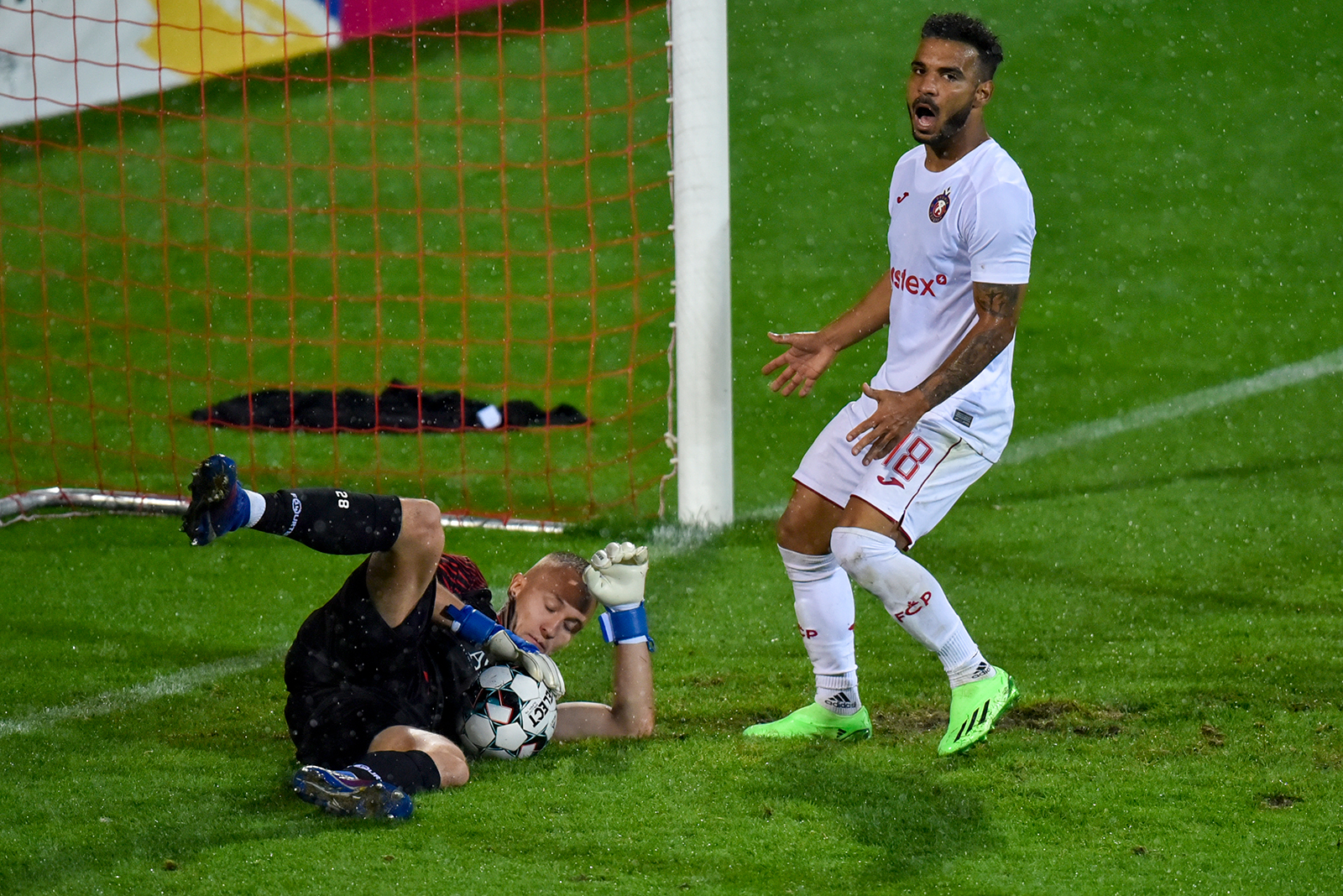
- Caraballo with Pyunik in 2022

Personal information
- Full name: José Enrique Caraballo Rosal
- Date of birth: 21 February 1996 (age 30)
- Place of birth: Carúpano, Venezuela
- Height: 1.68 m (5 ft 6 in)
- Position: Forward

Team information
- Current team: Anzoátegui
- Number: 17

Senior career*
Years	Team	Apps	(Gls)
2013–2016	Caracas	1	(0)
2014–2015	→ A.C.D. Lara	29	(3)
2016–2018	A.C.D. Lara	63	(10)
2016–2017	→ Atlante	8	(0)
2018–2020	Huachipato	16	(0)
2019	→ CD San José		
2019	→ A.C.D. Lara	15	(4)
2020	→ Real Santa Cruz	20	(10)
2021–2022	Pyunik	44	(11)
2022–2024	Pyunik	68	(11)
2025–2026	Deportivo La Guaira	13	(1)
2026–	Anzoátegui	5	(1)

International career^{‡}
	Venezuela U17	12	(1)
	Venezuela U20	2	(0)
- * Club domestic league appearances and goals as of 15 March 2026 ‡ National team caps and goals as of 20:23, 15 February 2021 (UTC)

José Enrique Caraballo Rosal (born 21 February 1996) is a Venezuelan professional footballer who plays as a forward for Venezuelan Primera División club Anzoátegui.

== Career ==
On 15 February 2021, Caraballo signed for Pyunik.

On 23 December 2024, Pyunik announced the departure of Caraballo.

On 14 February 2025, Deportivo La Guaira announced the signing of Caraballo.

== Career statistics ==
=== Club ===
As of match played 14 May 2024

Appearances and goals by club, season and competition
Club	Season	League			National cup (Note: Includes Armenian Cup)		Continental		Other		Total	
Club	Season	Division	Apps	Goals	Apps	Goals	Apps	Goals	Apps	Goals	Apps	Goals
Pyunik	2020–21	Armenian Premier League	12	3	1	0	-				13	3
Pyunik	2021–22	Armenian Premier League	32	8	2	0	-				34	8
Pyunik	2022–23	Armenian Premier League	28	6	2	0	0 (Note: Appearances in the UEFA Champions League, UEFA Europa League and UEFA Europa Conference League.)	0	0 (Note: Appearances in the Armenian Supercup.)	0	30	6
Pyunik	2023–24	Armenian Premier League	28	4	3	0	6 (Note: Appearances in the UEFA Europa Conference League.)	0	-		37	4
Pyunik	2024–25	Armenian Premier League	10	1	0	0	3 (Note: Two appearances in the UEFA Champions League and one appearance in the UEFA Conference League.)	0	-		13	1
Pyunik	Total		110	22	8	0	9	0	0	0	127	22
Career total			110	22	8	0	9	0	0	0	127	22

== Honours ==
Pyunik

- Armenian Premier League: 2021–22, 2023–24
