= Alejandro González =

Alejandro González may refer to:

== Sportspeople ==
- Alejandro González (basketball) (1907–1979), Uruguayan basketball player
- Alejandro González (Peruvian footballer) (1915–1953), Peruvian footballer
- Alejandro González (Costa Rican footballer) (born 1955), Costa Rican footballer
- Alejandro González (cyclist) (born 1972), Argentine road racing cyclist
- Alejandro González (boxer) (born 1973), Mexican boxer
- Alejandro González (Chilean footballer) (born 1977), Chilean footballer
- Alejandro González Garrido (born 1987), Spanish rugby player for Valladolid RAC
- Alejandro González (Uruguayan footballer) (born 1988), Uruguayan footballer
- Alejandro González (tennis) (born 1989), Colombian tennis player
- Alejandro González Jr. (born 1993), Mexican boxer, son of also the Mexican boxer Alejandro Martín González
- Ale González (born 1994), Spanish footballer

== Others ==
- Alejandro González Velázquez (1719–1772), Spanish late-Baroque architect and painter
- Alejandro González (painter) (born 1947), Chilean artist
- Alejandro González Alcocer (born 1951), former governor of the Mexican state of Baja California
- Alejandro González Yáñez (born 1956), Mexican politician
- Alejandro González Malavé (1958–1986), Puerto Rican undercover agent
- Alejandro González Iñárritu (born 1963), Mexican film director
- Alejandro González (guitarist), Cuban guitarist, composer, arranger, and professor with notable work in the Dominican Republic

== See also ==
- Alex Gonzalez (disambiguation)
