= Juninho (footballer, born July 1995) =

Brazilian footballer

Personal information
- Full name: Carlos Jamisson Teles dos Santos Júnior
- Date of birth: 29 July 1995 (age 31)
- Place of birth: Aracaju, Brazil
- Height: 1.77 m (5 ft 10 in)
- Position: Left back

Team information
- Current team: Falcon

Youth career
- 2013: Vitória
- 2015: Corinthians
- 2015: Bahia

Senior career*
Years	Team	Apps	(Gls)
2015	Flamengo-SP	10	(0)
2016	Bahia de Feira	8	(0)
2016	Confiança	1	(0)
2017	Freipaulistano	18	(1)
2018	Itabaiana	24	(1)
2018–2020	Paraná	41	(0)
2021–2025	Pyunik	92	(5)
2026–	Falcon		
- * Club domestic league appearances and goals as of 08:11, 19 August 2026 (UTC)

Carlos Jamisson Teles dos Santos Júnior (born 29 July 1995), known as Juninho, is a Brazilian footballer who plays as a left back for Falcon.

He played mostly in the lower leagues of his country, apart from 11 games in Campeonato Brasileiro Série A for Paraná Clube in 2018. In 2021, he moved to Pyunik, where he won the Armenian Premier League twice.

== Career ==
=== Early career ===
Born in Aracaju in the state of Sergipe, Juninho played in the youth teams of Vitória, Corinthians and Bahia. He made his senior debut in 2015 with Flamengo-SP in the Campeonato Paulista Série A3.

=== Paraná ===
In December 2017, Juninho returned to his home state, signing for Itabaiana. His team finished as runners-up in the Campeonato Sergipano, as well as competing in the Campeonato Brasileiro Série D and Copa do Nordeste. This led to a trial at Paraná Clube in August 2018, due to an agreement between the two clubs. He made his Campeonato Brasileiro Série A debut on 10 October in a 1–1 home draw with Vasco da Gama, and commented that manager Claudinei Oliveira had brought him in to combine with Mansur on counter-attacks. He finished the season with 11 appearances as Paraná were relegated, contributing assists against Cruzeiro, Botafogo and Palmeiras.

=== Pyunik ===
After the 2020 season in the Campeonato Brasileiro Série B, Juninho was released by Paraná and remained without a club until June 2021, when the 25-year-old moved abroad for the first time and joined Pyunik of the Armenian Premier League. He won the league in his first season, and on 26 July 2022 he scored his first UEFA Champions League goal in a 4–1 win away to F91 Dudelange of Luxembourg in the second qualifying round. After the team dropped into the UEFA Conference League group stage, he scored again in a 2–0 win at home to Žalgiris on 6 October. His team won the league again in 2023–24.

On 2 August 2025, Pyunik announced that Juninho had left the club.

=== Falcon ===
On 22 July 2026, Campeonato Sergipano club Falcon announced the signing of Juninho.
