= Serges Déblé =

Ivorian footballer (born 1989)

Personal information
- Date of birth: 1 October 1989 (age 37)
- Place of birth: Anyama, Ivory Coast
- Height: 1.76 m (5 ft 9 in)
- Position: Winger

Senior career*
Years	Team	Apps	(Gls)
2005–2008	ASEC Mimosas	71	(23)
2008–2011	Charlton Athletic	0	(0)
2008–2010	→ Angers (loan)	32	(1)
2010–2011	→ Nantes (loan)	24	(1)
2012–2013	Khimki	18	(2)
2012	→ SKA-Energiya (loan)	11	(0)
2013–2014	Shirak	26	(15)
2014–2017	Viborg FF	77	(24)
2017–2018	Meizhou Hakka	40	(9)
2019–2020	R&F	21	(16)
2021	Viborg FF	6	(1)
2021–2022	Ararat Yerevan	14	(14)
2022	Pyunik	16	(8)
2022–2023	Tobol	34	(10)
2024–2025	Pyunik	26	(10)
2025–2026	USSA Vertou	18	(5)

International career
2009	Ivory Coast U20	4	(3)
2011	Ivory Coast U23	6	(1)
- * Club domestic league appearances and goals as of 2 November 2026

Serges Déblé (born 1 October 1989) is an Ivorian former professional footballer who played as a winger.

== Club career ==
Born in Anyama, Ivory Coast, Déblé started his career with ASEC Mimosas.

In 2008, he was signed by Charlton Athletic but was loaned out to Angers SCO on 14 July 2008 due to work permit reasons. He then signed on loan for FC Nantes in 2010.

In January 2012, Déblé signed a short contract in Russia with FC Khimki. In May 2012, he joined with Russian first division club FC SKA-Energiya Khabarovsk on loan.

Deblé was released by Viborg FF at the end of the 2016–17 season. He made a free transfer to China League One side Meizhou Hakka on 21 June 2017.

On 15 January 2019, Déblé joined Hong Kong Premier League club R&F. On 14 October 2020, Déblé left the club after his club's withdrawal from the HKPL in the new season. On 13 February 2021, Déblé returned to Danish club Viborg FF. He left the club again at the end of the season.

On 2 July 2021, Déblé returned to the Armenian Premier League, signing for Ararat Yerevan. On 14 January 2022, Déblé left Ararat Yerevan by mutual consent. On 27 January 2022, Déblé signed for fellow Armenian Premier League club FC Pyunik.

On 28 June 2022, Déblé signed for FC Tobol on a one-year contract. On 22 December 2023, Tobol announced the departure of Déblé at the end of his contract.

On 12 January 2024, Déblé returned to Pyunik as a free-agent having previously been playing for Tobol. On 4 June 2025, Pyunik announced the departure of Déblé.

On 8 July 2025, Championnat National 3 club USSA Vertou announced the signing of Déblé.

== International career ==
Deblé played with the Ivory Coast U20 at 2009 African Youth Championship in Rwanda.

== Career statistics ==
As of match played 23 May 2025

Appearances and goals by club, season and competition
Club	Season	League			National Cup		League Cup		Continental		Other		Total	
Club	Season	Division	Apps	Goals	Apps	Goals	Apps	Goals	Apps	Goals	Apps	Goals	Apps	Goals
Angers (loan)	2008–09	Ligue 2	12	1	0	0	1	0	—		—		13	1
Angers (loan)	2009–10	Ligue 2	20	0	2	1	1	0	—		—		23	1
Angers (loan)	Total		32	1	2	1	2	0	0	0	0	0	36	2
Nantes (loan)	2010–11	Ligue 2	24	1	3	2	0	0	—		—		27	3
Khimki	2011–12	Russian Football National League	9	0	0	0	—		—		—		9	0
Khimki	2012–13	Russian Football National League	9	2	0	0	—		—		—		9	2
Khimki	Total		18	2	0	0	0	0	0	0	0	0	18	2
SKA-Energiya (loan)	2012–13	Russian Football National League	11	0	1	0	—		—		—		12	0
Shirak	2013–14	Armenian Premier League	26	15	2	0	—		—		1	1	29	16
Shirak	2014–15	Armenian Premier League	–		—		—		2	1	—		2	1
Shirak	Total		26	15	2	0	0	0	2	1	1	1	31	17
Viborg FF	2014–15	1. Division	26	14	0	0	—		—		—		26	14
Viborg FF	2015–16	Danish Superliga	25	5	2	1	—		—		—		27	6
Viborg FF	2016–17	Danish Superliga	26	5	1	0	—		—		5	1	32	6
Viborg FF	Total		77	24	3	1	0	0	0	0	5	1	85	26
Meizhou Hakka	2017	China League One	16	4	0	0	—		—		—		16	4
Meizhou Hakka	2018	China League One	24	5	0	0	—		—		—		24	5
Meizhou Hakka	Total		40	9	0	0	0	0	0	0	0	0	40	9
R&F	2018–19	Hong Kong Premier League	8	4	0	0	—		—		0	0	8	4
R&F	2019–20	Hong Kong Premier League	13	12	3	0	—		—		8	5	24	17
R&F	Total		21	16	3	0	0	0	0	0	8	5	32	21
Viborg FF	2020–21	1. Division	6	1	—		—		—		—		6	1
Ararat Yerevan	2021–22	Armenian Premier League	14	14	0	0	—		4	0	0	0	18	14
Pyunik	2021–22	Armenian Premier League	16	8	—		—		—		—		16	8
Tobol	2022	Kazakhstan Premier League	10	3	—		—		—		—		10	3
Tobol	2023	Kazakhstan Premier League	24	7	5	0	—		5	1	—		34	8
Tobol	Total		34	10	5	0	0	0	5	1	0	0	44	11
Pyunik	2023–24	Armenian Premier League	4	1	1	0	—		0	0	—		5	1
Pyunik	2024–25	Armenian Premier League	22	9	2	0	—		4	1	1	0	29	10
Pyunik	Total		26	10	3	0	-	-	4	1	1	0	34	11
Career total			345	111	22	4	2	0	15	3	15	7	399	125

== Honours ==
Pyunik

- Armenian Premier League: 2021–22, 2023–24

Individual

- Hong Kong Premier League top scorer: 2019–20 (6 goals)
- Armenian Premier League top scorer: 2021–22 (22 goals)
