= Bruno Nascimento =

Brazilian footballer (born 1991)

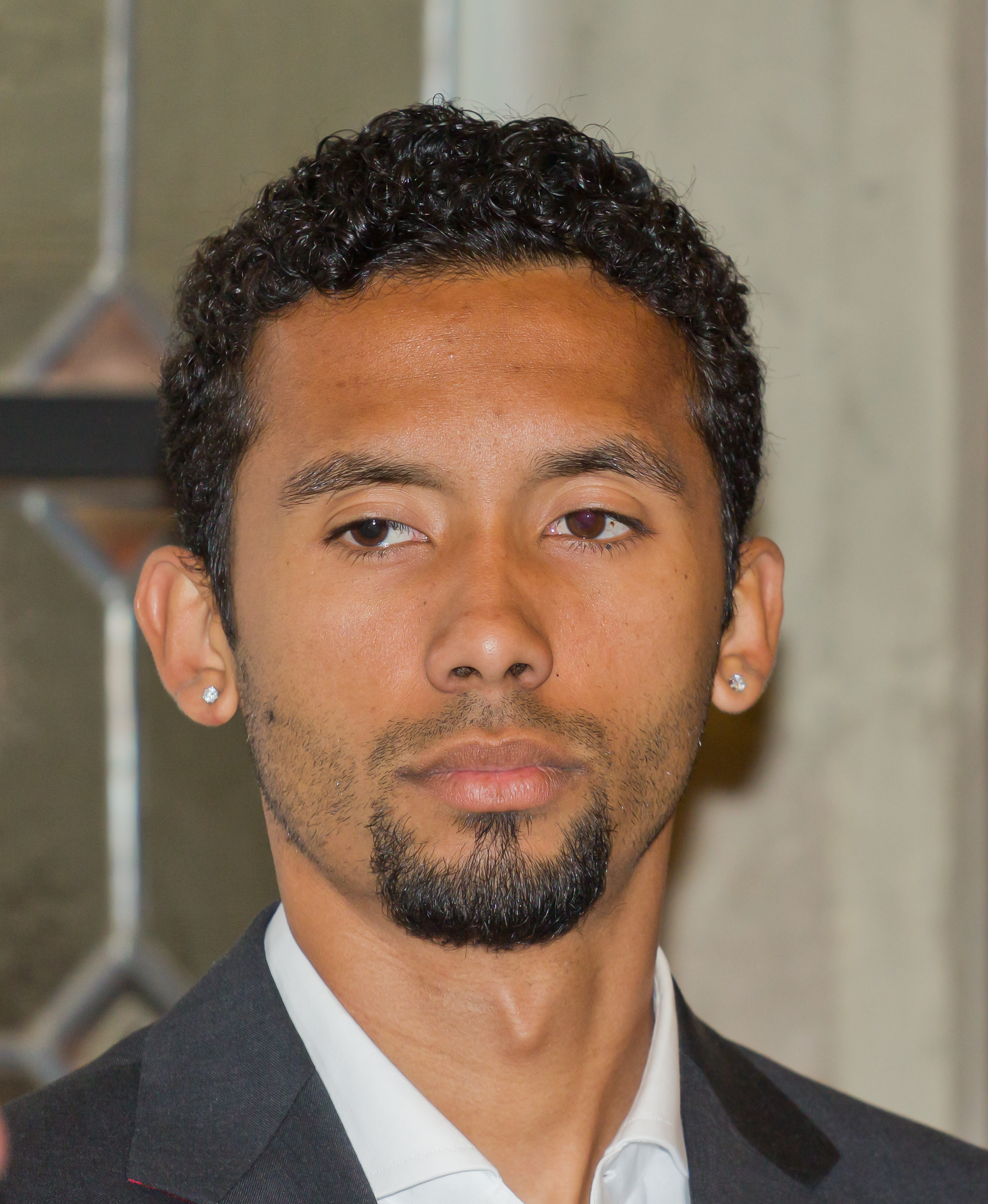
- Nascimento as a 1. FC Köln player

Personal information
- Full name: Bruno Andrade de Toledo Nascimento
- Date of birth: 30 May 1991 (age 35)
- Place of birth: Caçapava, Brazil
- Height: 1.88 m (6 ft 2 in)
- Position: Centre-back

Senior career*
Years	Team	Apps	(Gls)
2010	Desportivo Brasil		
2010–2013	Estoril	33	(1)
2013	→ Köln (loan)	6	(1)
2013–2016	Köln	7	(0)
2014–2015	→ Estoril (loan)	9	(0)
2015–2016	→ Tondela (loan)	24	(0)
2016–2017	Omonia	9	(0)
2017–2019	Feirense	23	(0)
2019–2020	Manama Club	0	(0)
2020–2021	Al-Hidd	0	(0)
2021–2022	Pyunik	12	(0)
- * Club domestic league appearances and goals as of 07:13, 8 June 2022 (UTC)

Bruno Andrade de Toledo Nascimento (born 30 May 1991) is a Brazilian professional footballer who plays as a centre-back.

== Club career ==
Born in Caçapava, São Paulo, Nascimento started playing football with amateurs Desportivo Brasil. In the middle of 2010, he signed with Portuguese club G.D. Estoril Praia, achieving promotion to the Primeira Liga at the end of the 2011–12 season.

Nascimento made his debut in the Portuguese top flight on 26 August 2012, playing the full 90 minutes in a 1–1 home draw against F.C. Paços de Ferreira. In late January 2013, he was loaned to 1. FC Köln in the 2. Bundesliga, playing his first match on 18 February by coming on as a late substitute in a 1–0 victory over FC St. Pauli; at the end of the campaign, the Germans signed him to a four-year contract for an undisclosed fee.

On 28 August 2014, Nascimento returned to Estoril, this time on a season-long loan deal. The following year, he joined another Primeira Liga club, C.D. Tondela, also on loan.

On 8 July 2016, Nascimento signed a contract with the Cypriot club AC Omonia. On 26 April 2017, having scarcely featured, he was released.

In August 2019 it was confirmed, that Nascimento had joined Manama Club in Bahrain.

On 17 August 2021, Pyunik announced the signing of Nascimento. On 1 June 2022, Nascimento left Pyunik after his contract expired.

== Career statistics ==
As of match played 27 October 2017

Appearances and goals by club, season and competition
Club	Season	League			National Cup		League Cup		Europe		Total	
Club	Season	Division	Apps	Goals	Apps	Goals	Apps	Goals	Apps	Goals	Apps	Goals
Estoril	2010–11	Segunda Liga	6	0	0	0	1	0	—		7	0
Estoril	2011–12	Segunda Liga	13	0	0	0	7	0	—		20	0
Estoril	2012–13	Primeira Liga	14	1	0	0	3	0	—		17	3
Estoril	Total		33	1	0	0	11	0	—		44	1
1. FC Köln (loan)	2012–13	2. Bundesliga	6	1	0	0	—		—		6	1
1. FC Köln	2013–14	2. Bundesliga	7	0	1	0	—		—		8	0
Estoril (loan)	2014–15	Primeira Liga	9	0	0	0	1	0	2 (Note: Appearances in the Europa League)	0	12	0
Tondela (loan)	2015–16	Primeira Liga	24	0	0	0	1	0	—		25	0
Omonia Nicosia	2016–17	Cypriot First Division	9	0	1	0	—		1	0	11	0
Feirense	2017–18	Primeira Liga	6	0	0	0	0	0	—		6	0
Career total			94	2	2	0	13	0	3	0	112	2

== Honours ==
Pyunik

- Armenian Premier League: 2021–22
