= Adnan Šećerović =

Bosnian professional footballer (born 1991)

Personal information
- Date of birth: 1 December 1991 (age 34)
- Place of birth: Živinice, SFR Yugoslavia
- Height: 1.80 m (5 ft 11 in)
- Position: Defensive midfielder

Team information
- Current team: Sloboda Tuzla
- Number: 22

Youth career
- –2008: Slaven Živinice

Senior career*
Years	Team	Apps	(Gls)
2008–2014	Roda JC	1	(0)
2008–2009	→ Slaven Živinice (loan)	7	(2)
2010–2011	→ NEC (loan)	0	(0)
2011–2013	→ Fortuna Sittard (loan)	14	(0)
2013–2014	→ MVV (loan)	34	(1)
2014–2015	Sloboda Tuzla	11	(0)
2015	Austria Lustenau	10	(0)
2015–2016	Radnik Bijeljina	25	(1)
2016–2017	Željezničar	8	(0)
2017–2018	Mladost	38	(0)
2018–2019	Tuzla City	14	(0)
2019–2020	AEL	49	(0)
2020–2021	Riga	7	(0)
2021	Pyunik	15	(0)
2022	Sarajevo	11	(0)
2022	RoundGlass Punjab	8	(0)
2023–2024	Doxa Katokopias	5	(0)
2024–2025	Tuzla City	25	(2)
2025–	Sloboda Tuzla	22	(1)

International career
2018	Bosnia and Herzegovina	1	(0)
- * Club domestic league appearances and goals as of 12 June 2026

Adnan Šećerović (born 1 December 1991) is a Bosnian professional footballer who plays as a defensive midfielder for Sloboda Tuzla.

== Club career ==
Šećerović had previously played in the Netherlands with Roda JC Kerkrade, NEC, Fortuna Sittard and MVV Maastricht

In the 2014–15 season, Šećerović played with Sloboda Tuzla and Austria Lustenau. In July 2015, he signed with Radnik Bijeljina. with whom he won the 2015–16 Bosnian Cup.

After Radnik, he also played for Željezničar from 2016 to 2017, Mladost Doboj Kakanj from 2017 until 2018 and for Tuzla City in 2018.

On 17 December 2018, Šećerović signed a two-and-a-half-year contract with AEL in Greece.

=== RoundGlass Punjab ===
In September 2022, Šećerović signed for I-League club RoundGlass Punjab.

== International career ==
Šećerović made his international debut for Bosnia and Herzegovina in a friendly 1–0 loss against Mexico on 1 February 2018, coming in as a substitute for Elvis Sarić in the 75th minute.

== Club statistics ==
=== Club ===
As of 21 December 2022

Club	Season	League			National Cup		League Cup		Continental		Total	
Club	Season	Division	Apps	Goals	Apps	Goals	Apps	Goals	Apps	Goals	Apps	Goals
Roda JC	2009–10	Eredivisie	1	0	0	0	0	0	—		1	0
Roda JC	2012–13	Eredivisie	0	0	0	0	0	0	—		0	0
Roda JC	2013–14	Eredivisie	0	0	0	0	0	0	—		0	0
Roda JC	Total		1	0	0	0	0	0	0	0	1	0
NEC (loan)	2010–11	Eredivisie	0	0	0	0	0	0	—		0	0
Fortuna Sittard (loan)	2011–12	Eerste Divisie	13	0	1 (Note: Appearance(s) in KNVB Cup)	0	0	0	—		14	0
Fortuna Sittard (loan)	2012–13	Eerste Divisie	1	0	0	0	0	0	—		1	0
Fortuna Sittard (loan)	Total		14	0	1	0	0	0	0	0	15	0
MVV (loan)	2013–14	Eerste Divisie	31	1	3	0	0	0	—		34	1
Sloboda Tuzla	2014–15	Premijer Liga	11	0	1 (Note: Appearance(s) in Bosnia and Herzegovina Football Cup)	0	0	0	—		12	0
Austria; Lustenau	2014–15	Austrian First League	10	0	0	0	0	0	—		0	0
Radnik; Bijeljina	2015–16	Premijer Liga	25	1	7	0	0	0	—		32	2
Željo	2016–17	Premijer Liga	8	0	2	0	0	0	—		10	0
Mladost	2016–17	Premijer Liga	11	0	0	0	0	0	—		11	0
Mladost	2017–18	Premijer Liga	27	0	2	0	0	0	—		29	0
Mladost	Total		38	0	2	0	0	0	0	0	40	0
Tuzla City	2018–19	Premijer Liga	14	0	1	0	0	0	—		15	0
AEL	2018–19	Super League Greece	14	0	2 (Note: Appearance(s) in Greek Football Cup)	0	0	0	—		16	0
AEL	2019–20	Super League Greece	30	0	1	0	0	0	—		31	0
AEL	2020–21	Super League Greece	5	0	0	0	0	0	—		5	0
AEL	Total		49	0	3	0	0	0	0	0	52	0
Riga	2021	Latvian Higher League	7	0	0	0	0	0	—		7	0
Pyunik	2021–22	Armenian Premier; League	15	0	1 (Note: Appearance(s) in Armenian Cup)	0	0	0	—		16	0
Sarajevo	2021–22	Premijer Liga	11	0	4	0	0	0	—		15	0
RoundGlass; Punjab	2022–23	I-League	8	0	0	0	0	0	—		8	0
Career total			242	2	25	0	0	0	0	0	267	2

== Honours ==
Radnik Bijeljina

- Bosnian Cup: 2015–16
