= Mat Armstrong (YouTuber) =

British YouTuber and automotive content creator (born 1993)

- Born: Leicester, England
- Occupations: YouTuber; automotive content creator; Bugatti Owner; former professional BMX rider
- Years active: 2016–present
- Partner: Hannah Smith

YouTube information
- Channels: Mat Armstrong; Mat Armstrong MK2; Mat Armstrong Shorts
- Subscribers: 10.48 million (combined)
- Views: 1.492 billion (combined)

Mat Armstrong is a British YouTuber who documents the purchase, restoration and modification of damaged luxury and performance vehicles on his YouTube channel.

== Early life and background ==
Armstrong was born in Leicester, England; his father was a car mechanic. He attended Lutterworth College in Leicester.

== YouTube career ==
Armstrong launched his YouTube channel Mat Armstrong in 2013 and started documenting automotive projects. His first was rebuilding a damaged Audi TT. Armstrong's father, Tony Armstrong, was important in his development as a mechanic.

== Bugatti Chiron Pur Sport project and manufacturer dispute ==
In late 2025, Armstrong began documenting the restoration of a heavily damaged Bugatti Chiron Pur Sport on behalf of its owner, American influencer Alex Gonzalez, after the hypercar was declared a total loss by insurance and sold at auction. Bugatti initially quoted approximately $1.7 million for a factory repair, and then offered a repair for under $700,000, which the owner turned down. Bugatti then refused to sell official parts or support an independent rebuild conducted outside of its authorised network. The manufacturer’s stance effectively “blacklisted” the car’s VIN, making it difficult to source genuine components through dealers.
