= Alexander González (footballer, born 1992) =

Venezuelan footballer

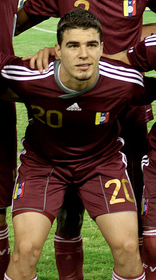
- González with Venezuela in 2011

Personal information
- Full name: Alexander David González Sibulo
- Date of birth: 13 September 1992 (age 34)
- Place of birth: Maracay, Aragua, Venezuela
- Height: 1.77 m (5 ft 9 1/2 in)
- Position: Right back

Team information
- Current team: Carabobo
- Number: 21

Youth career
- Caracas

Senior career*
| Years | Team | Apps | (Gls) |
| 2009–2011 | Caracas | 65 | (8) |
| 2012–2016 | BSC Young Boys | 33 | (3) |
| 2013–2014 | → FC Aarau (loan) | 27 | (3) |
| 2014–2015 | → FC Thun (loan) | 30 | (4) |
| 2016–2018 | Huesca | 82 | (7) |
| 2018–2019 | Elche | 24 | (1) |
| 2019–2020 | Mirandés | 26 | (0) |
| 2020 | Dinamo București | 7 | (1) |
| 2021 | Málaga | 16 | (0) |
| 2022–2022 | Pyunik | 14 | (0) |
| 2023 | Caracas | 30 | (0) |
| 2024–2025 | C.S. Emelec | 56 | (2) |
| 2026– | Carabobo | 1 | (0) |

International career^{‡}
| 2011 | Venezuela U20 | 4 | (0) |
| 2011– | Venezuela | 67 | (2) |
- * Club domestic league appearances and goals as of 20 August 2025 ‡ National team caps and goals as of 23:17, 10 June 2025 (UTC)

Alexander David González Sibulo (born 13 September 1992) is a Venezuelan professional footballer who plays for Carabobo and the Venezuela national team. Mainly a right back, he can also play as a right winger.

== Career ==
=== Caracas ===
Born in Caracas, González started his professional career at Caracas, and made his debut as a right back in the year 2010 by coach Noel Sanvicente.

During the 2010/2011 he became a regular and scored 4 goals, playing the season as a right midfielder and right back. In the Copa Libertadores 2011, he played the 6 games of the group stage where his team was eliminated in the final match against Vélez Sarsfield. After a successful season, he won the Best Young Player In Venezuela 2010/11 Season award.

=== BSC Young Boys ===
It was announced that on January 3, 2012, Alexander would go to BSC Young Boys. He made his debut with the Swiss team on 25 March 2012 with a 4–0 win against FC Thun.

He scored his first goal for the club on 5 May 2012 against FC Luzern. He scored for the first time in Europe competition on 6 December 2012 against Anzhi Makhachkala in the UEFA Europa League 2012/13 season .

==== FC Aarau & FC Thun loans ====
On 1 July 2013, Gonzalez became a member of newly promoted Super League club FC Aarau. Where he played 27 games before joining FC Thun on loan in the summer of 2014.

=== Huesca ===
On 31 January 2016, it was announced that González had agreed to an 18-month contract with SD Huesca in Segunda División. On 30 August 2017, he renewed his contract for a further year.

=== Elche / Mirandés ===
On 4 August 2018, free agent González signed for Elche CF also in the Spanish second division. On 26 August of the following year, he joined fellow league team CD Mirandés also on a one-year deal.

=== Dinamo Bucharest ===
In September 2020, González signed a two-year contract with Romanian side Dinamo București. After only three months, he ended his contract with the Liga I club.

=== Málaga ===
On 28 December 2020, free agent González returned to the Spanish second division with Málaga CF, after agreeing to a contract until 30 June 2021.

=== Pyunik ===
On 3 February 2022, Pyunik announced the signing of González.

=== Caracas return ===
On 9 February 2023, González returned to his first club Caracas.

== International career ==
González made his debut for Venezuela in 2009. He was also part of the Venezuela squad who reached 4th place in the 2011 Copa America.

González was also part of the Venezuela squad for the Copa América Centenario, which saw Venezuela knocked out of the quarter finals after a 4–1 loss against Argentina including 2 goals from Lionel Messi for Argentina.

== Miscellaneous ==
He was one of the judges for the 2023 Miss Venezuela pageant.

== Career statistics ==
=== Club ===
As of match played 31 May 2025

Appearances and goals by club, season and competition
| Club | Season | League | | | National Cup (Note: Includes Swiss Cup, Cupa României, Copa del Rey, Armenian Cup) | | League Cup | | Continental | | Other | | Total | |
| Club | Season | Division | Apps | Goals | Apps | Goals | Apps | Goals | Apps | Goals | Apps | Goals | Apps | Goals |
|---|---|---|---|---|---|---|---|---|---|---|---|---|---|---|
| Young Boys | 2011–12 | Swiss Super League | 6 | 1 | 0 | 0 | — | | — | | — | | 6 | 1 |
| Young Boys | 2012–13 | Swiss Super League | 21 | 1 | 1 | 0 | — | | 9 (Note: Appearances and goal in the UEFA Europa League) | 1 | — | | 31 | 2 |
| Young Boys | 2013–14 | Swiss Super League | 0 | 0 | 0 | 0 | — | | — | | — | | 0 | 0 |
| Young Boys | 2014–15 | Swiss Super League | 0 | 0 | 0 | 0 | — | | — | | — | | 0 | 0 |
| Young Boys | 2015–16 | Swiss Super League | 6 | 1 | 0 | 0 | — | | 3 (Note: One appearance in the UEFA Champions League, and two appearances in the UEFA Europa League) | 0 | — | | 9 | 1 |
| Young Boys | Total | | 33 | 3 | 1 | 0 | - | - | 12 | 1 | - | - | 46 | 4 |
| Aarau (loan) | 2013–14 | Swiss Super League | 27 | 3 | 2 | 0 | — | | — | | — | | 29 | 3 |
| Thun (loan) | 2014–15 | Swiss Super League | 31 | 4 | 2 | 1 | — | | — | | — | | 33 | 5 |
| Huesca | 2015–16 | Segunda División | 16 | 2 | 0 | 0 | — | | — | | — | | 16 | 2 |
| Huesca | 2016–17 | Segunda División | 35 | 4 | 2 | 0 | — | | — | | — | | 37 | 4 |
| Huesca | 2017–18 | Segunda División | 31 | 1 | 0 | 0 | — | | — | | — | | 31 | 1 |
| Huesca | Total | | 84 | 7 | 2 | 0 | - | - | - | - | - | - | 86 | 7 |
| Elche | 2018–19 | Segunda División | 24 | 1 | 0 | 0 | — | | — | | — | | 24 | 1 |
| Mirandés | 2019–20 | Segunda División | 26 | 0 | 6 | 1 | — | | — | | — | | 32 | 1 |
| Dinamo București | 2020–21 | Liga I | 7 | 1 | 0 | 0 | — | | — | | — | | 7 | 1 |
| Málaga | 2020–21 | Segunda División | 16 | 0 | 2 | 0 | — | | — | | — | | 18 | 0 |
| Pyunik | 2021–22 | Armenian Premier League | 14 | 0 | 0 | 0 | — | | — | | — | | 14 | 0 |
| Pyunik | 2022–23 | Armenian Premier League | 5 | 0 | 0 | 0 | — | | 14 (Note: Six appearances in the UEFA Champions League, two appearances in the UEFA Europa League and six appearances in the UEFA Europa Conference League) | 0 | — | | 19 | 0 |
| Pyunik | Total | | 19 | 0 | 0 | 0 | - | - | 14 | 0 | - | - | 33 | 0 |
| Caracas | 2023 | Venezuelan Primera División | 27 | 0 | 0 | 0 | — | | 1 (Note: Appearances in Copa Sudamericana) | 0 | — | | 28 | 0 |
| Emelec | 2024 | Ecuadorian Serie A | 22 | 1 | 0 | 0 | — | | — | | — | | 22 | 1 |
| Emelec | 2025 | Ecuadorian Serie A | 14 | 0 | 0 | 0 | — | | — | | — | | 14 | 0 |
| Emelec | Total | | 36 | 1 | 0 | 0 | — | | — | | — | | 36 | 1 |
| Career total | | | 328 | 20 | 15 | 2 | 0 | 0 | 27 | 1 | — | | 370 | 23 |

=== International ===
As of match played 10 June 2025

Appearances and goals by national team and year
| National team | Year | Apps | Goals |
|---|---|---|---|
| Venezuela | 2011 | 7 | 0 |
| Venezuela | 2012 | 4 | 0 |
| Venezuela | 2013 | 8 | 0 |
| Venezuela | 2014 | 5 | 1 |
| Venezuela | 2015 | 6 | 0 |
| Venezuela | 2016 | 11 | 0 |
| Venezuela | 2017 | 3 | 0 |
| Venezuela | 2018 | 2 | 0 |
| Venezuela | 2019 | 0 | 0 |
| Venezuela | 2020 | 2 | 0 |
| Venezuela | 2021 | 8 | 0 |
| Venezuela | 2022 | 1 | 0 |
| Venezuela | 2023 | 2 | 1 |
| Venezuela | 2024 | 5 | 0 |
| Venezuela | 2025 | 3 | 0 |
| Total | | 67 | 2 |

==== International goals ====
Scores and results list Venezuela's goal tally first.

List of international goals scored by Alexander González
| No. | Date | Venue | Opponent | Score | Result | Competition | Ref. |
|---|---|---|---|---|---|---|---|
| 1 | 18 November 2014 | Estadio Hernando Siles, La Paz, Bolivia | Bolivia | 2–2 | 2–3 | Friendly | |
| 2 | 28 March 2023 | King Abdullah Sports City, Jeddah, Saudi Arabia | Uzbekistan | 1–0 | 1–1 | Friendly | |

== Honours ==
Pyunik

- Armenian Premier League: 2021–22
