= Arman Hovhannisyan =

Armenian footballer

Personal information
- Full name: Arman Surenovich Hovhannisyan
- Date of birth: 12 May 1993 (age 33)
- Place of birth: Yerevan, Armenia
- Height: 1.78 m (5 ft 10 in)
- Position: Defender

Team information
- Current team: Ararat Yerevan
- Number: 2

Youth career
- 2007–2010: Pyunik Yerevan

Senior career*
Years	Team	Apps	(Gls)
2010–2014	Pyunik Yerevan	60	(0)
2010	→ Pyunik-2 Yerevan	10	(0)
2014–2015	Alashkert	20	(1)
2014	→ Alashkert-2	1	(0)
2015–2017	Shirak Gyumri	46	(1)
2017–2018	Zirka Kropyvnytskyi	16	(0)
2018–2019	Ararat-Armenia	8	(0)
2019–2020	Gandzasar Kapan	20	(1)
2020	Tobol	3	(0)
2021–2022	Pyunik Yerevan	28	(0)
2022–2023	Ararat-Armenia	6	(0)
2023	Ararat Yerevan	6	(0)
2023–2025	Pyunik Yerevan	16	(0)
2025–	Ararat Yerevan	1	(0)

International career^{‡}
2011–2012	Armenia U19	5	(0)
2013	Armenia U21	6	(0)
2019–2022	Armenia	12	(0)
- * Club domestic league appearances and goals as of 11 December 2025 ‡ National team caps and goals as of 14 June 2022

Arman Hovhannisyan (Armenian: Արման Հովհաննիսյան, born 7 July 1993) is an Armenian professional footballer who plays as a defender for Ararat Yerevan and the Armenia national team.

== Career ==
Born in Yerevan, Hovhannisyan is a product of his native Pyunik Yerevan youth sportive system and signed first contract with this club in 2009. Subsequently, he played for another Armenian Premier League football clubs.

In July 2017 Hovhannisyan signed two years contract with the Ukrainian Premier League Zirka Kropyvnytskyi. He made his debut in the Ukrainian Premier League for FC Zirka on 16 July 2017, playing in a match against FC Karpaty Lviv.

On 12 February 2020, FC Tobol announced the signing of Hovhannisyan.

On 25 January 2021, Hovhannisyan returned to his boyhood club and signed for FC Pyunik in the Armenian Premier League. On 30 May 2022, Hovhannisyan left Pyunik after his contract expired.

On 19 February 2023, Ararat Yerevan announced the signing of Hovhannisyan. In June of the same year he returned to Pyunik again.

On 14 June 2025, Hovhannisyan left Pyunik. A month later he returned to Ararat Yerevan.

== International ==
He made his Armenia national football team debut on 8 September 2019 in a Euro 2020 qualifier against Bosnia & Herzegovina. He replaced Kamo Hovhannisyan in the 83rd minute.

As of match played 14 June 2022

National Team	Year	Apps	Goals
Armenia
Armenia	2019	3	0
Armenia	2020	4	0
Armenia	2022	5	0
Total		12	0

== Honours ==
Pyunik

- Armenian Premier League: 2021–22, 2023–24
