= Zoran Gajić (footballer) =

Serbian footballer

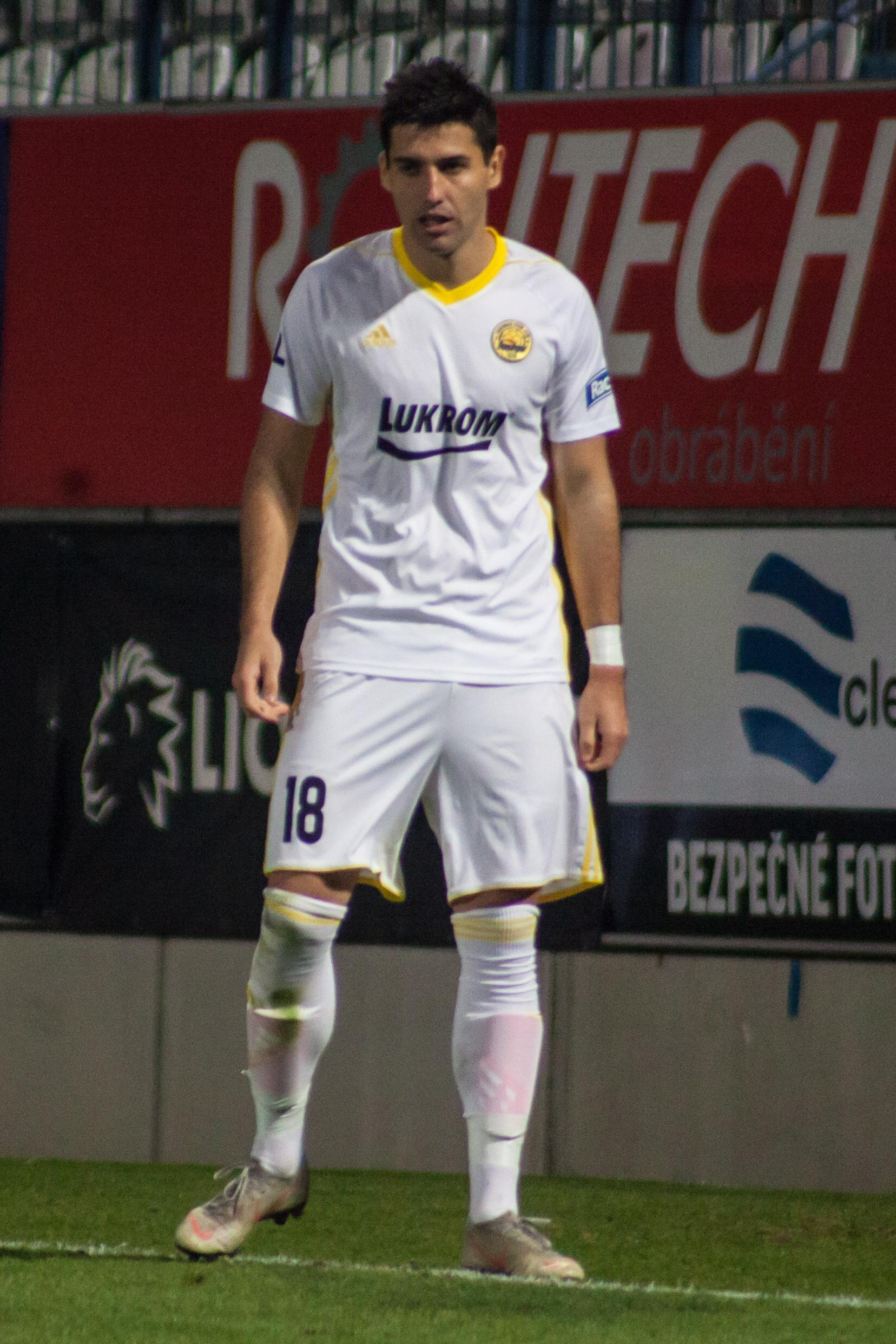
- Gajić in 2018

Personal information
- Date of birth: 18 May 1990 (age 36)
- Place of birth: Belgrade, SR Serbia, SFR Yugoslavia
- Height: 1.86 m (6 ft 1 in)
- Position: Centre-back

Senior career*
Years	Team	Apps	(Gls)
2011–2012	Voždovac		
2012–2013	Sinđelić Beograd		
2013–2014	BSK Borča	39	(5)
2015–2016	Bohemians 1905	33	(0)
2017–2019	Fastav Zlín	71	(1)
2019–2020	Arda Kardzhali	22	(0)
2020–2021	Zbrojovka Brno	12	(0)
2021–2022	Pyunik Yerevan	28	(1)
2023	Kolubara	0	(0)
- * Club domestic league appearances and goals as of 9 May 2023

Zoran Gajić (born 18 May 1990) is a Serbian professional footballer who most recently played as a centre-back for Serbian SuperLiga club Kolubara.

== Career ==
On 29 June 2021, Gajić signed for Pyunik, leaving the club on 25 December 2022 when his contract expired.

== Honours ==
Pyunik Yerevan

- Armenian Premier League: 2021–22
