= Nikita Baranov =

Estonian footballer (born 1992)

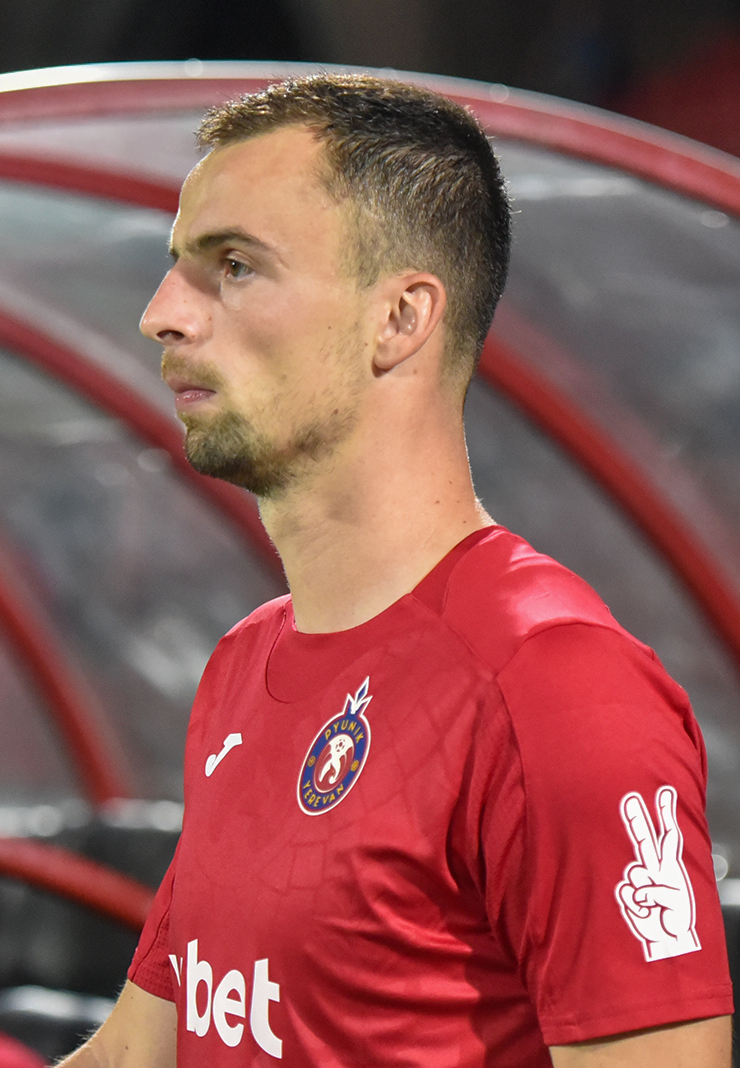
- Baranov with Pyunik in 2022

Personal information
- Date of birth: 19 August 1992 (age 34)
- Place of birth: Tallinn, Estonia
- Height: 1.84 m (6 ft 1/2 in)
- Position: Centre-back

Team information
- Current team: Paide Linnameeskond
- Number: 27

Youth career
- 2002–2008: Puuma
- 2010: Flora

Senior career*
Years	Team	Apps	(Gls)
2008	Ararat	13	(1)
2009	Elva	3	(0)
2009	Warrior	33	(2)
2010–2013	Flora II	45	(7)
2010–2016	Flora	159	(4)
2017–2018	Kristiansund	33	(0)
2018	Sogndal	12	(0)
2019	Beroe	16	(0)
2019–2020	Alashkert	21	(0)
2020–2021	Karmiotissa	23	(0)
2021	Ħamrun Spartans	0	(0)
2021–2023	Pyunik	41	(2)
2024–	Paide Linnameeskond	78	(2)

International career^{‡}
2009	Estonia U18	2	(0)
2010–2011	Estonia U19	14	(0)
2012–2014	Estonia U21	14	(1)
2012–2015	Estonia U23	3	(0)
2015–	Estonia	45	(0)
- * Club domestic league appearances and goals as of 17 November 2026 ‡ National team caps and goals as of 21 December 2022

Nikita Baranov (born 19 August 1992) is an Estonian professional footballer who plays as a centre-back for Meistriliiga club Paide Linnameeskond and the Estonia national team.

== Club career ==
=== Early career ===
Baranov began playing football with Puuma's youth teams. He then played for Ararat, Elva and Warrior.

=== Flora ===
In 2010, Baranov signed for Flora. He made his Flora – and Meistriliiga – debut on 14 August 2010, in a 5–0 home victory over Lootus. He won his first Meistriliiga title in the 2011 season, and his second one in the 2015 season.

=== Kristiansund ===
On 15 February 2017, Baranov signed a two-year contract with Eliteserien club Kristiansund.

=== Sogndal ===
On 26 July 2018, Baranov signed a one-and-a-half-year contract with OBOS-ligaen club Sogndal.

=== Beroe ===
Baranov joined Beroe in January 2019, but was released in early August 2019.

=== Alashkert ===
Baranov joined Armenian club FC Alashkert in August 2019 with a one-year deal. On 27 July 2020, his contract was ended by mutual consent.

=== Karmiotissa ===
On 20 August 2020 he signed Cypriot top-division club Karmiotissa and debuted a day later.

=== Hamrun Spartans ===
In May 2021 he signed for Maltese champions Hamrun Spartans.

== International career ==
Baranov made his senior international debut for Estonia on 11 November 2015, in a 3–0 home victory over Georgia in a friendly.

== Honours ==
=== Club ===
Pyunik

- Armenian Premier League: 2021–22

Flora

- Meistriliiga: 2011, 2015
- Estonian Cup: 2012–13, 2015–16
- Estonian Supercup: 2011, 2012, 2016
