= Lazar Jovanović (footballer, born 1993) =

Serbian footballer

Lazar Jovanović Лазар Јовановић
Personal information
- Full name: Lazar Jovanović
- Date of birth: 13 July 1993 (age 33)
- Place of birth: Užice, FR Yugoslavia
- Height: 1.82 m (6 ft 0 in)
- Position: Forward

Team information
- Current team: GOŠK Gabela
- Number: 69

Youth career
- Jedinstvo Užice
- Sloboda Užice

Senior career*
Years	Team	Apps	(Gls)
2012–2014	Sloboda Užice	48	(5)
2015	Mladost Lučani	16	(4)
2016–2018	Borac Čačak	61	(11)
2018–2021	Mladost Lučani	93	(12)
2021–2022	Pyunik	5	(0)
2022	Radnički Niš	17	(2)
2022-2023	Maccabi Bnei Reineh	10	(0)
2023	Radnički Niš	11	(0)
2024	Radnik Surdulica	9	(0)
2024	Rudar Prijedor	16	(6)
2025–	GOŠK Gabela	8	(1)

International career
2017	Serbia	1	(0)
- * Club domestic league appearances and goals as of 10 June 2025

Lazar Jovanović (Serbian Cyrillic: Лазар Јовановић; born 13 July 1993) is a Serbian professional footballer who plays as a forward for GOŠK Gabela.

== Club career ==
Born in Užice, Jovanović went through the youth system at local clubs Jedinstvo and Sloboda, making his senior debut with the latter in March 2012. He subsequently played for Mladost Lučani, before joining Borac Čačak during the 2016 winter transfer window. In the 2016–17 Serbian SuperLiga, Jovanović was the team's top scorer with eight goals from 34 appearances, helping the side narrowly avoid relegation.

== International career ==
Jovanović made his international debut for Serbia under Slavoljub Muslin, coming on as a late second-half substitute for Srđan Plavšić in a goalless draw against the United States in San Diego on 29 January 2017.

== Honours ==
Individual

- Serbian SuperLiga Player of the Week: 2022–23 Round 2
