= Yeghishe Melikyan =

Armenian footballer and manager

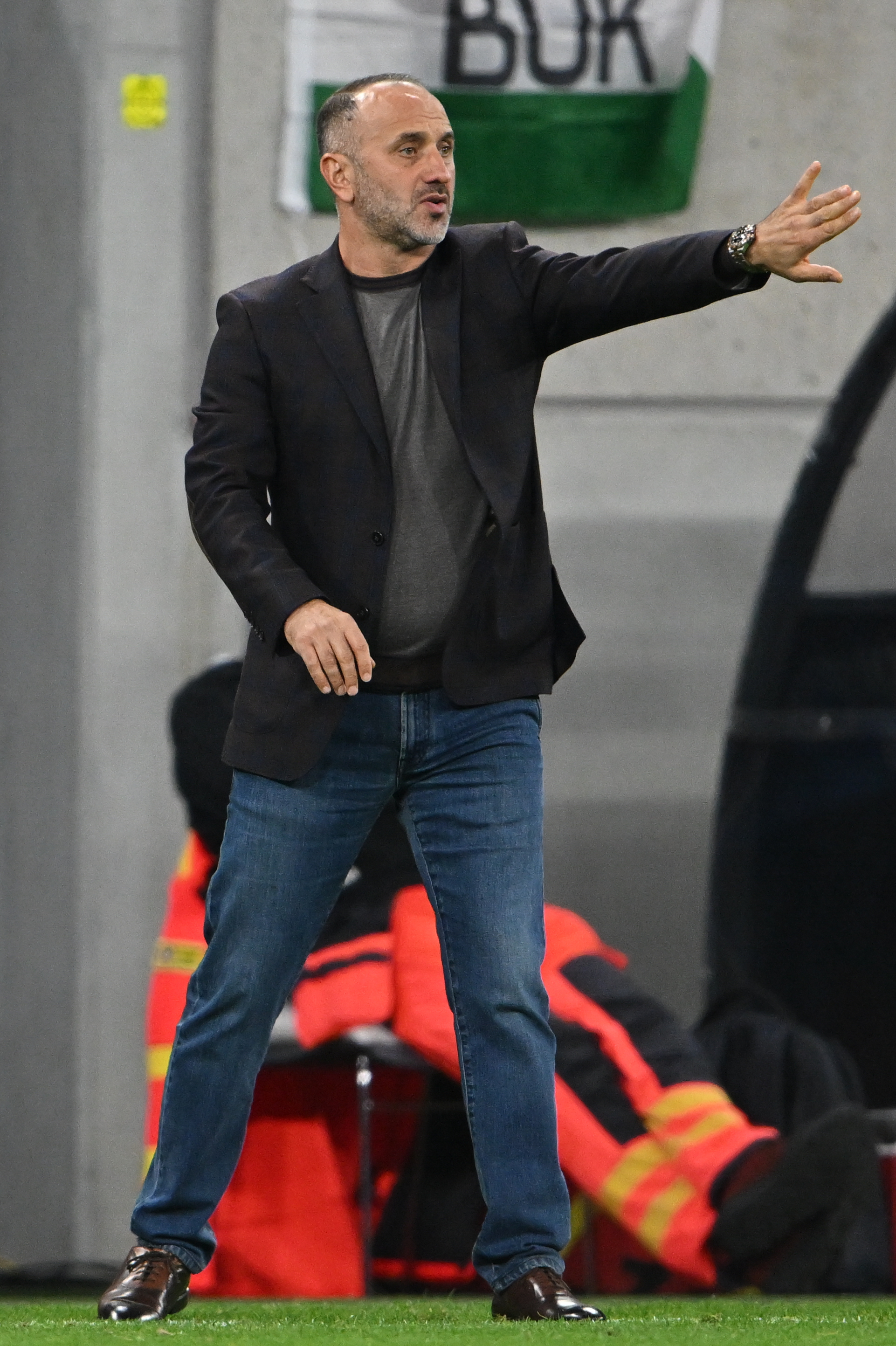
- Melikyan managing Armenia in 2025

Personal information
- Full name: Yeghishe Meliki Melikyan
- Date of birth: 13 April 1979 (age 47)
- Place of birth: Yerevan, Soviet Armenia, Soviet Union (present-day Armenia)
- Height: 1.75 m (5 ft 9 in)
- Position: Left back

Team information
- Current team: Armenia (manager)

Youth career
- 1997–1998: Dvin Artashat

Senior career*
Years	Team	Apps	(Gls)
1999–2000	Araks Ararat		
2000–2001	Banants Yerevan		
2002–2009	Metalurh Donetsk	57	(1)
2003	→ Metalurh-2 Donetsk	1	(0)
2006–2006	→ Stal Alchevsk (loan)	9	(1)
2007–2008	→ Banants Yerevan (loan)	36	(3)
2009	→ Ulisses Yerevan (loan)	7	(0)
2009	→ Zorya Luhansk (loan)	14	(1)
2010	Ulisses Yerevan	11	(0)
2010	Krymteplytsia Molodizhne	0	(0)
2010–2013	Hoverla-Zakarpattia Uzhhorod	41	(1)

International career^{‡}
2002–2009	Armenia	29	(0)

Managerial career
- 2015: Metalurh Donetsk (U-19)
- 2015: Metalurh Donetsk (U-21)
- 2015: Stal Dniprodzerzhynsk (U-19)
- 2016–2017: Stal Kamianske (U-21)
- 2017: Stal Kamianske
- 2019: Lviv (assistant)
- 2019–2020: Lviv
- 2020–2021: Alashkert
- 2021–2025: Pyunik
- 2025–: Armenia
- * Club domestic league appearances and goals as of 11 May 2012 ‡ National team caps and goals as of 12 September 2007

Yeghishe Meliki Melikyan (Armenian: Եղիշե Մելիքի Մելիքյան, born on 13 August 1979) is a retired Armenian football defender and manager. He is the current manager of the Armenia national football team.

== Career ==
=== International ===
Melikyan was a member of the Armenia national team, participating in 29 international matches since his debut in away Euro 2004 qualifying match against Greece on 16 October 2002.

== Managerial career ==
On 26 June 2017, Melikyan was appointed head coach of Stal Kamianske. On 25 September 2017, he left the club.

On September 2019, Melikyan was appointed assistant to head coach Volodymyr Mazyar at Lviv. On 31 October 2019, he was appointed head coach of this team. On 21 June 2020, Lviv decided to part ways with Melikyan upon the expiration of his contract.

On 28 June 2020, Melikyan was appointed as manager of Alashkert. On 5 January 2021, he left the club by mutual consent.

On 7 January 2021, Melikyan was appointed as manager of FC Pyunik. On 27 January 2025, Pyunik extended their contract with Melikyan until the end of the 2025–26 season.

On 6 August 2025, Melikyan left FC Pyunik and was appointed head coach of the Armenia national team.

== International career statistics ==
As of match played 12 September 2007

Armenia national team
Year	Apps	Goals
2002	1	0
2003	5	0
2004	7	0
2005	6	0
2006	3	0
2007	7	0
Total	29	0

== Honours ==
=== Player ===
Araks Ararat

- Armenian Cup: 1999
- Armenian Premier League: 2000

Banants

- Armenian Cup: 2007

=== Manager ===
Pyunik

- Armenian Premier League: 2021–22, 2023-24

Individual

- Armenian Premier League Manager of the Season: 2021–22, 2023–24
