= Stanislav Buchnev =

Armenian footballer (born 1990)

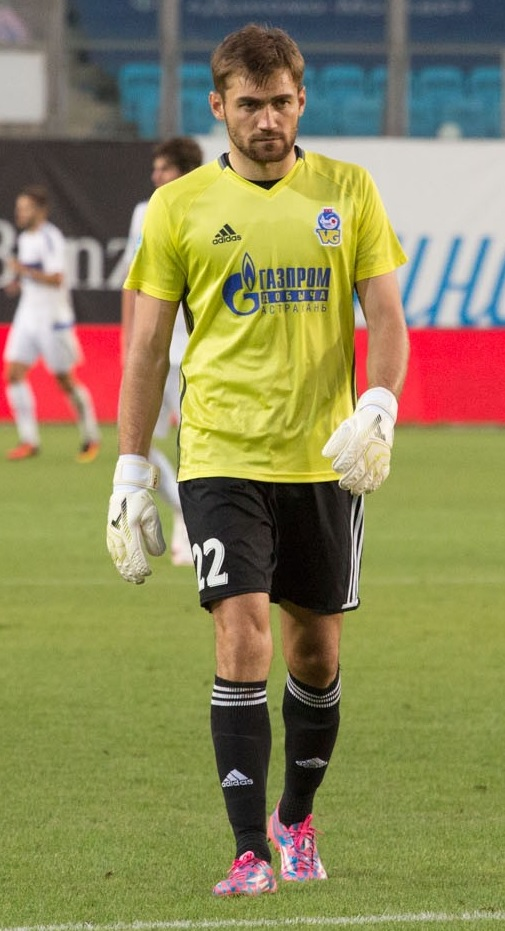
- Buchnev with Volgar in 2016

Personal information
- Full name: Stanislav Sergeyevich Buchnev
- Date of birth: 17 July 1990 (age 36)
- Place of birth: Ordzhonikidze, Russian SFSR, Soviet Union
- Height: 1.85 m (6 ft 1 in)
- Position: Goalkeeper

Team information
- Current team: Pyunik
- Number: 71

Senior career*
Years	Team	Apps	(Gls)
2008–2009	Avtodor Vladikavkaz	10	(0)
2010	Neftekhimik Nizhnekamsk	3	(0)
2011–2013	Mashuk-KMV Pyatigorsk	60	(0)
2013–2014	Angusht Nazran	20	(0)
2014–2017	Volgar Astrakhan	111	(0)
2018–2019	Tyumen	40	(0)
2019–2020	Fakel Voronezh	11	(0)
2020–	Pyunik	111	(0)

International career^{‡}
2021–	Armenia	5	(0)
- * Club domestic league appearances and goals as of 11 December 2025 ‡ National team caps and goals as of 02:20, 22 March 2024 (UTC)

Stanislav Sergeyevich Buchnev (Armenian: Ստանիսլավ Բուչնև; Russian: Станислав Сергеевич Бучнев; born 17 July 1990) is a professional footballer who plays as a goalkeeper for Pyunik. Born in Russia, he plays for the Armenia national team.

== Club career ==
Buchnev made his Russian Football National League debut for FC Angusht Nazran on 2 August 2013 in a game against FC Salyut Belgorod.

On 29 July 2020, Buchnev signed for Armenian Premier League club FC Pyunik.

== International career ==
Born in Russia and of Armenian descent, Buchnev was called up to represent the Armenia national team for 2022 FIFA World Cup qualification matches in September 2021. He made a debut for the national team on 14 November 2021 in a 1–4 loss against Germany.

== Honours ==
Pyunik

- Armenian Premier League: 2021–22, 2023–24
