= Hugo Firmino =

Portuguese footballer

Personal information
- Full name: Hugo Filipe Pinto Servulo Firmino
- Date of birth: 22 December 1988 (age 37)
- Place of birth: Torres Vedras, Portugal
- Height: 1.85 m (6 ft 1 in)
- Position: Forward

Team information
- Current team: Malveira

Youth career
- 2001–2004: Almada
- 2004–2008: Beira Mar Almada

Senior career*
Years	Team	Apps	(Gls)
2008–2009	Torreense	2	(0)
2009–2010	Encarnacense		
2010	Odivelas	8	(2)
2011	Portosantense	20	(11)
2011	Moura	10	(3)
2012	Torreense	16	(0)
2012	Interclube		
2013	Caála	?	(1)
2014–2015	Kabuscorp	20	(2)
2015–2016	Oriental	39	(5)
2016	União Madeira	9	(0)
2017	Gil Vicente	19	(5)
2017–2019	Cova Piedade	68	(8)
2019	Universitatea Cluj	1	(0)
2019–2020	Estoril	12	(1)
2020	Doxa	12	(0)
2021	Cova Piedade	18	(5)
2021–2022	Pyunik	30	(16)
2022–2023	Ararat-Armenia	23	(9)
2023–2024	Penafiel	30	(1)
2024–2025	Amora	33	(7)
2025–2026	São João Ver	26	(2)
2026–	Malveira	4	(1)
- * Club domestic league appearances and goals as of 21:29, 7 October 2026 (UTC)

Hugo Filipe Pinto Servulo Firmino (born 22 December 1988) is a Portuguese professional footballer who plays as a forward for Campeonato de Portugal club Malveira.

== Club career ==
Born in Torres Vedras, Lisbon District, Firmino played lower league or amateur football until the age of 24. He then took his game to the Angolan Girabola where he remained three years, representing G.D. Interclube, C.R. Caála and Kabuscorp SCP.

Firmino returned to Portugal ahead of the 2015–16 season, signing with Clube Oriental de Lisboa. He made his debut in the LigaPro on 8 August 2015, starting and scoring in the 3–0 away win against U.D. Oliveirense.

Firmino continued to compete in the second division in the following years, with C.F. União, Gil Vicente FC and C.D. Cova da Piedade. During his two-year spell with the latter club he appeared in 79 competitive matches, scored 14 goals and provided 23 assists. On 20 October 2018, he was one of two players on target as his team ousted Portimonense S.C. of the Primeira Liga after defeating the opposition 2–1 in the third round of the Taça de Portugal.

On 30 June 2019, Firmino joined Romanian Liga II side FC Universitatea Cluj. Days before the official announcement of the transfer, the Portuguese press wrongly announced that he had moved to CFR Cluj, their bitter rivals from Cluj-Napoca. He only lasted two months in the country, however, before leaving for G.D. Estoril Praia in the Portuguese second tier on a two-year deal after terminating his contract by mutual consent.

Firmino spent the following years in the Armenian Premier League, with FC Pyunik and FC Ararat-Armenia. While in service of the former, he won the national championship and was voted Player of the Season.

== Honours ==
Pyunik

- Armenian Premier League: 2021–22

Individual

- Armenian Premier League Player of the Season: 2021–22
