= Hayk Ishkhanyan =

Armenian footballer

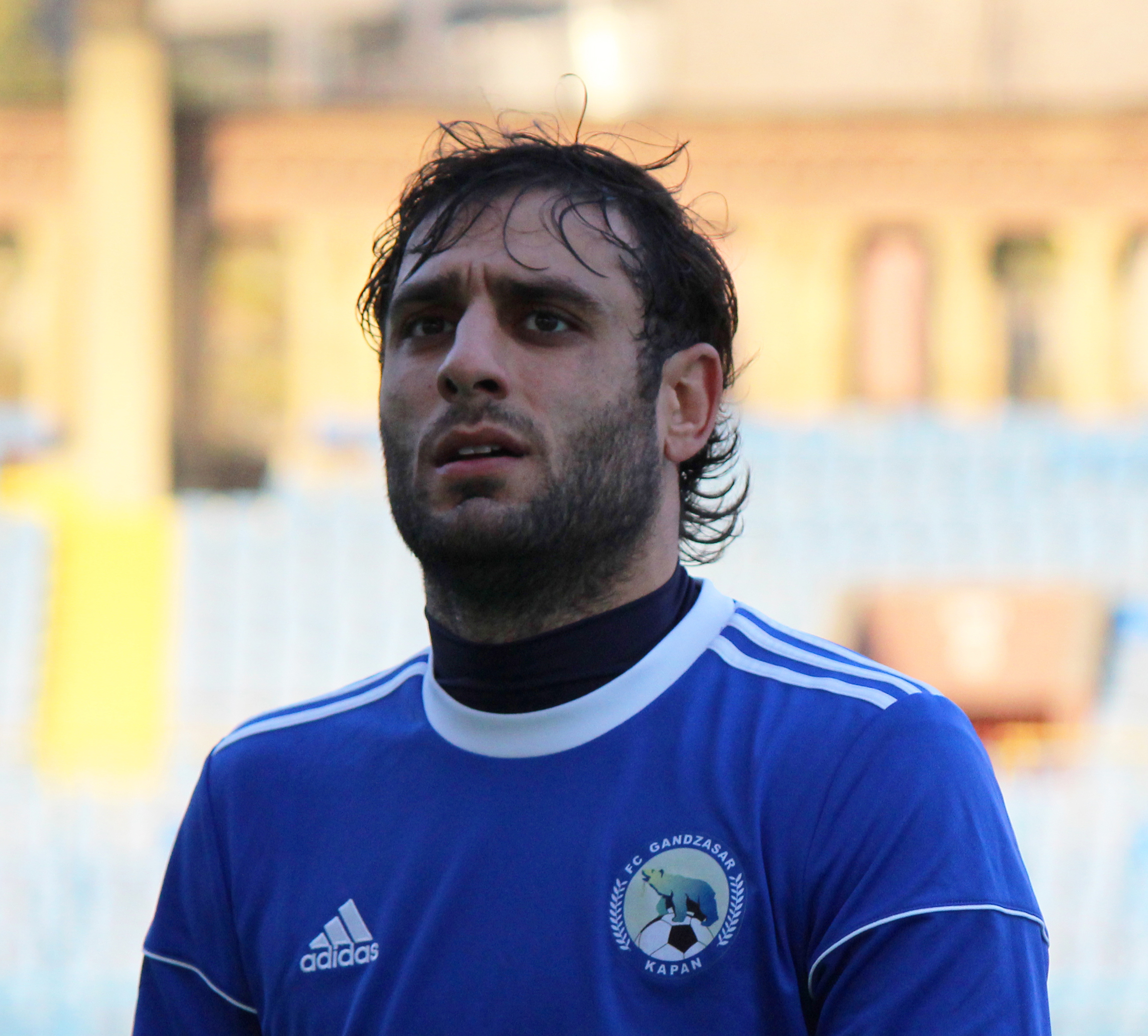
- Hayk Ishkhanyan with Gandzasar Kapan FC in 2017

Personal information
- Full name: Hayk Ishkhanyan
- Date of birth: 24 June 1989 (age 37)
- Place of birth: Yerevan, Armenian SSR, Soviet Union
- Height: 1.81 m (5 ft 11 1/2 in)
- Position: Centre-back

Team information
- Current team: Ararat Yerevan
- Number: 6

Senior career*
Years	Team	Apps	(Gls)
2008–2009	Shirak	7	(0)
2009–2011	Mika	36	(0)
2012–2013	Impuls	24	(1)
2013	Mika	3	(0)
2014–2015	Alashkert	18	(1)
2015–2018	Gandzasar Kapan	87	(5)
2019	Lori	14	(0)
2019–2020	Alashkert	10	(0)
2020	Zhetysu	0	(0)
2020	Alashkert	3	(0)
2020	Gandzasar Kapan	8	(0)
2021	Shirak	11	(0)
2021	Pyunik	4	(0)
2021–2022	BKMA Yerevan	25	(0)
2022–	Ararat Yerevan	21	(0)

International career^{‡}
2017–	Armenia	13	(1)
- * Club domestic league appearances and goals as of 9 April 2023 ‡ National team caps and goals as of 19:22, 1 July 2022 (UTC)

Hayk Ishkhanyan (Armenian: Հայկ Իշխանյան; born 24 June 1989) is an Armenian professional footballer who plays as a centre-back for Ararat Yerevan and the Armenia national team.

== Career ==
On 21 June 2019, Ishkhanyan signed for FC Alashkert.

On 23 January 2020, Ishkhanyan was released by Alashkert to pursue a move abroad, however after initially signing for Kazakhstan Premier League club Zhetysu following his release, Ishkhanyan returned to Alashkert on 4 March 2020.

On 21 July 2020, FC Gandzasar Kapan announced the return of Ishkhanyan.

On 19 June 2021, Ishkhanyan signed for FC Pyunik. Less three months later, 13 September 2021, Ishkhanyan left Pyunik to sign for BKMA Yerevan.

On 27 June 2022, Ararat Yerevan announced the signing of Ishkhanyan.

== Career statistics ==
=== International ===
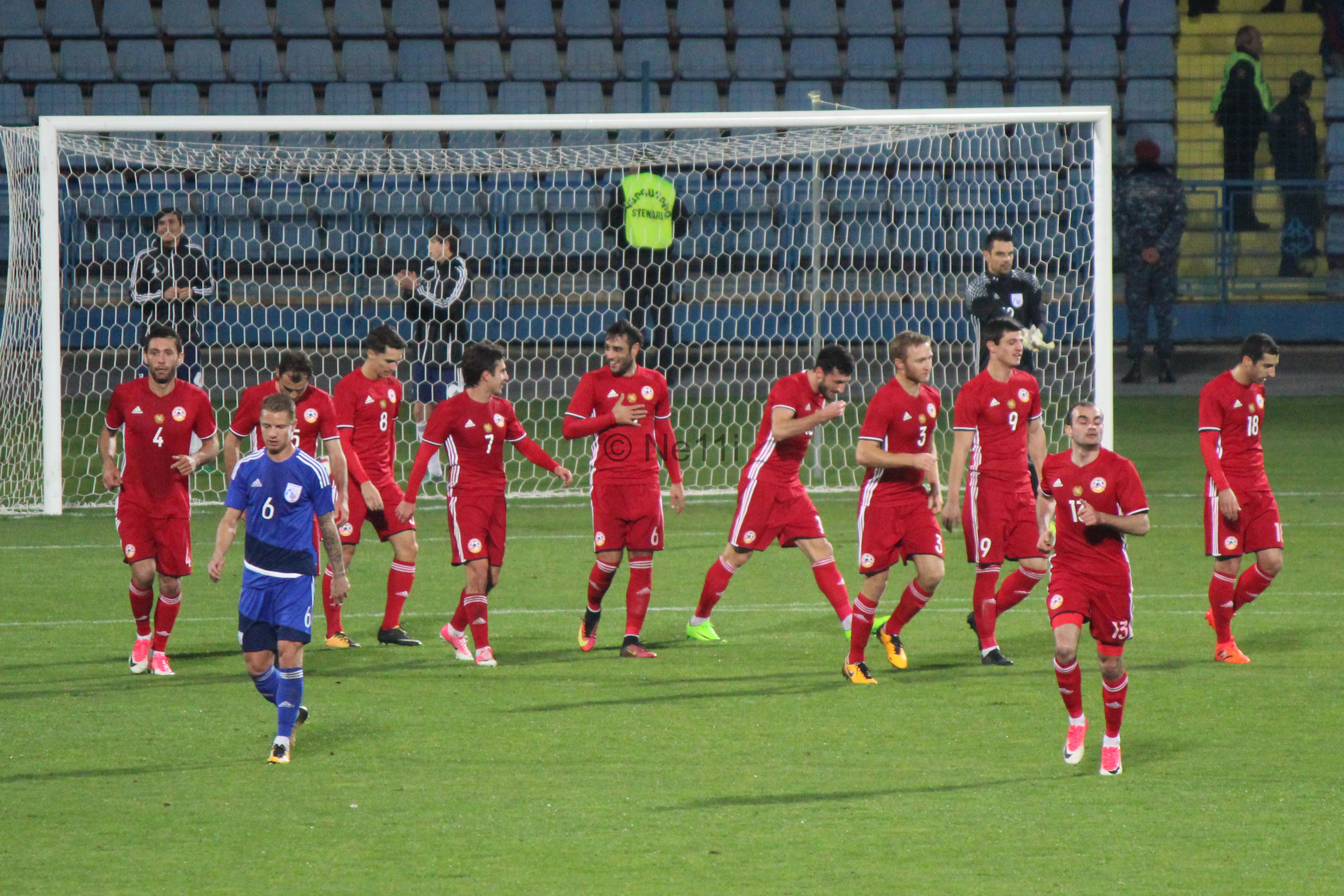
Ishkhanyan celebrating after his first Armenian goal.

As of match played 18 November 2020

Appearances and goals by national team and year
National team	Year	Apps	Goals
Armenia	2017	2	1
Armenia	2018	4	0
Armenia	2019	6	0
Armenia	2020	1	0
Total		13	1

=== International goals ===
As of goal scored on 13 November 2017
Scores and results list Armenia's goal tally first, score column indicates score after each Armenia goal.

List of international goals scored by Hayk Ishkhanyan
No.	Date	Venue	Opponent	Score	Result	Competition	Ref.
1	13 November 2017	Republican Stadium, Yerevan, Armenia	Cyprus	1–0	3–2	Friendly	
