= Alex Gonzalez (investor) =

American investor

- Born: 2000 (age 25–26); Miami, Florida, U.S.
- Occupation: Investor

Alex Gonzalez (born 2000) is an American investor. He is based in Miami, Florida. Gonzalez received media attention for his flamboyant posts on Instagram.

== Early life ==
Gonzalez's parents fled Cuba; he was born in Miami. At 15, he worked at Dunkin' Donuts and other jobs.

== Career ==
While working at Dunkin', in the evening, he traded on the London Stock Exchange with a US$100 initial investment.

In 2023, Gonzalez worked with Francis Suarez, the mayor of Miami, to provide free gas fill-ups at Charles Hadley Park in Liberty City.

In 2024, during Super Bowl LVIII, he streaked across the field during the third quarter. He was booked into the Clark County Detention Center on misdemeanor charges.

Gonzalez describes himself as a day trader and teaches foreign exchange trading via Zoom.
