= 2023–24 Armenian Premier League =

Armenian Premier League
- Season: 2023–24
- Dates: 29 July 2023 – 26 May 2024
- Champions: Pyunik
- Champions League: Pyunik
- Conference League: Ararat-Armenia; Noah; Urartu
- Matches: 180
- Goals: 503 (2.79 per match)
- Top goalscorer: Artur Miranyan (23 goals)
- Biggest home win: Pyunik 6–0 Van (2 November 2023); BKMA 7–1 Van (30 November 2023)
- Biggest away win: BKMA Yerevan 0–6 Alashkert (27 February 2024)
- Highest scoring: West Armenia 2–5 Urartu (1 September 2023); Ararat-Armenia 4–3 Noah (15 September 2023); BKMA 7–1 Van (30 November 2023)
- Longest winning run: 8 matches Pyunik
- Longest unbeaten run: 20 matches Pyunik
- Longest winless run: 9 matches Shirak; Van
- Longest losing run: 8 matches Shirak; Van
- All statistics correct as of 26 May 2024.

The 2023–24 Armenian Premier League, known as the IDBank Armenian Premier League (Armenian: IDBank Հայաստանի Պրեմիեր Լիգա) for sponsorship reasons, was the 32nd season of the league since its establishment.

== Season events ==
On 7 July 2023, Football Federation of Armenia announced the draw for the 2023–24 season, which began on 29 July 2023.

On 28 July, the Football Federation of Armenia announced IDBank as the new title sponsor of the championship.

== Teams ==
Promoted from 2022–23 Armenian First League	Relegated to 2023–24 Armenian First League
West Armenia	Lernayin Artsakh

Locations of the teams

Club	Location	Stadium	Capacity
Alashkert	Yerevan (Shengavit)	Alashkert Stadium	6,850
Ararat Yerevan	Yerevan (Kentron)	Vazgen Sargsyan Republican Stadium	14,403
Ararat-Armenia	Yerevan (Avan)	Yerevan Football Academy Stadium^{1}	1,428
BKMA	Yerevan (Avan)	Yerevan Football Academy Stadium^{1}	1,428
Noah	Abovyan	Abovyan City Stadium^{1}	3,100
Pyunik	Yerevan (Shengavit)	Junior Sport Stadium	1,000
Shirak	Gyumri	Gyumri City Stadium	4,000
Urartu	Yerevan (Malatia-Sebastia)	Urartu Stadium	4,860
Van	Charentsavan	Charentsavan City Stadium	5,000
West Armenia	Yerevan (Shengavit)	Junior Sport Stadium	1,000

=== Personnel and sponsorship ===
Team	Manager	Captain	Kit manufacturer	Shirt sponsor
Alashkert	(Armenia) Vahe Gevorgyan	(Armenia) Artak Yedigaryan	(Germany) Sport-Saller	(Armenia) Fastex
Ararat Yerevan	(Armenia) Tigran Yesayan	(Armenia) Gor Malakyan	(Switzerland) Fourteen	(Armenia) FastBank, (Switzerland) AWI International
Ararat-Armenia	(Armenia) Vardan Minasyan	(Armenia) Armen Ambartsumyan	(Germany) Puma	(Armenia) Tashir Group
BKMA	(Armenia) Vahagn Minasyan	(Armenia) Artur Grigoryan	(Italy) Macron	Football Federation of Armenia
Noah	(Spain) Carlos Inarejos	(Armenia) Artur Miranyan	(Germany) Adidas	(Armenia) to.sport fm 96.3
Pyunik	(Armenia) Yegishe Melikyan	(Armenia) Edgar Malakyan	(Spain) Joma	(Armenia) Fastex
Shirak	(Armenia) Arsen Hovhannisyan	(Armenia) Hrayr Mkoyan	(Germany) Adidas	(Armenia) FastBank
Urartu	(Russia) Dmitri Gunko	(Armenia) Zhirayr Margaryan	(Germany) Puma	–
Van	(Armenia) Arthur Hovhannisyan	(Armenia) David Manoyan	(Germany) Puma	(Armenia) FastShift, (Armenia) Rare
West Armenia	(Armenia) Khoren Veranyan	(Armenia) Aram Loretsyan	(Italy) Legea	(Armenia) Fastex

=== Managerial changes ===
Team	Outgoing manager	Manner of departure	Date of vacancy	Position in table	Incoming manager	Date of appointment
Ararat-Armenia	Vardan Bichakhchyan	End of contract	8 June 2022	Pre-season	Vardan Minasyan	17 June 2023
Van	Hayk Hovhannisyan	End of contract	30 June 2022	Pre-season	Sevada Arzumanyan	1 July 2023
Shirak	Edgar Torosyan	Resigned	22 August 2023	9th	Arsen Hovhannisyan	22 August 2023
Noah	Robert Arzumanyan	Sacked	29 September 2023	5th	Carlos Inarejos	29 September 2023
Ararat Yerevan	Gagik Simonyan	Sacked	12 December 2023	7th	Rafael Nazaryan	15 December 2023
Van	Sevada Arzumanyan			9th	Arthur Hovhannisyan	14 January 2024
Ararat Yerevan	Rafael Nazaryan	Mutual termination	26 January 2024	7th	Tigran Yesayan	19 February 2024

== League table ==
Pos	Team	Pld	W	D	L	GF	GA	GD	Pts	Qualification or relegation
1	Pyunik (C)	36	24	10	2	84	28	+56	82	Qualification for the Champions League first qualifying round
2	Noah	36	26	2	8	69	33	+36	80	Qualification for the Conference League first qualifying round
3	Ararat-Armenia	36	23	6	7	73	34	+39	75	Qualification for the Conference League second qualifying round (Note: Ararat-Armenia qualified for the Conference League second qualifying round by winning the 2023–24 Armenian Cup. Since they qualified based on league position, the second Conference League first round spot was passed to the fourth-placed team.)
4	Urartu	36	13	11	12	49	49	0	50	Qualification for the Conference League first qualifying round
5	Alashkert	36	13	6	17	54	56	−2	45	
6	Ararat Yerevan	36	13	6	17	39	50	−11	45	
7	West Armenia	36	11	4	21	43	73	−30	37	
8	Shirak	36	8	9	19	28	46	−18	33	
9	Van	36	8	8	20	32	67	−35	32	
10	BKMA	36	7	6	23	32	67	−35	27	

Source: FFA Soccerway
Rules for classification: 1) Points; 2) Head-to-head points; 3) Head-to-head goal difference; 4) Head-to-head goals scored; 5) Matches won; 6) Goal difference; 7) Less red cards; 8) Less yellow cards; 9) Fair-play ranking 10) Draw
(C) Champions

== Fixtures and results ==
=== Results table ===
Home \ Away	ALA	ARA	AAR	BKM	NOA	PYU	SHI	URA	VAN	WAR	ALA	ARA	AAR	BKM	NOA	PYU	SHI	URA	VAN	WAR
Alashkert		2–1	1–1	1–0	3–1	0–2	0–0	4–2	0–0	2–0		2–1	1–3	0–0	0–2	1–1	2–3	0–2	0–1	1–2
Ararat Yerevan	0–1		1–3	0–2	0–2	0–5	2–1	1–1	2–1	1–0	1–3		0–1	1–0	0–1	0–1	2–0	0–0	1–1	1–0
Ararat-Armenia	3–1	2–1		4–1	4–3	1–2	2–0	1–2	3–0	4–0	2–1	2–1		4–1	0–1	3–1	1–1	2–0	0–2	1–1
BKMA	0–4	2–0	1–1		1–0	1–4	1–3	1–2	7–1	0–4	0–6	1–3	0–1		0–2	0–3	0–0	2–0	0–0	1–1
Noah	4–2	3–0	1–0	3–0		0–1	4–0	2–0	1–0	5–1	2–1	4–3	2–1	1–0		1–1	1–0	1–1	3–1	3–1
Pyunik	3–1	1–1	1–1	3–0	3–1		1–0	3–1	6–0	3–0	2–1	2–2	2–2	3–1	3–0		1–1	5–0	3–1	2–1
Shirak	2–3	1–2	1–3	0–1	0–2	1–1		0–2	2–0	0–0	2–0	0–1	0–1	1–0	1–0	0–1		1–0	0–0	1–2
Urartu	1–0	2–1	2–1	2–1	1–0	1–1	2–2		3–1	1–2	6–1	1–1	1–3	2–1	0–1	1–1	0–0		1–1	1–2
Van	2–1	1–2	0–2	1–2	0–2	0–5	1–0	2–2		4–1	2–3	0–2	0–5	2–2	0–1	1–0	4–0	1–1		1–0
West Armenia	1–4	0–2	1–4	1–0	2–4	2–3	2–4	2–5	2–0		1–1	1–2	0–1	3–2	2–5	1–4	1–0	1–0	2–0	

Source: Soccerway
Legend: Blue = home team win; Yellow = draw; Red = away team win.

== Season statistics ==
=== Top scorers ===
As of match played 26 May 2024

Rank	Player	Club	Goals
1	(Armenia) Artur Miranyan	Noah	23
2	(Nigeria) Yusuf Otubanjo	Pyunik	21
3	(Guinea) Mohamed Yattara	Ararat-Armenia	18
4	(Nigeria) Tenton Yenne	Ararat-Armenia	16
5	(Georgia (country)) Levan Kutalia	Alashkert	12
5	(Armenia) Hovhannes Harutyunyan	Pyunik	12
7	(Russia) Temur Dzhikiya	Urartu	11
8	(Netherlands) Paul Gladon	Noah	9
9	(Armenia) Edgar Movsesyan	Noah	8
9	(Nigeria) Christopher Boniface	Van	8
9	(Armenia) Grenik Petrosyan	BKMA	8
9	(Russia) Zakhar Tarasenko	West Armenia	8
9	(Armenia) Karen Nalbandyan	Alashkert	8

=== Hat-tricks ===
Player	For	Against	Result	Date	Ref
(Russia) Temur Dzhikiya	Urartu	West Armenia	5–2 (A)	1 September 2023	
(Nigeria) Yusuf Otubanjo	Pyunik	Van	5–0 (A)	2 September 2023	
(Guinea) Mohamed Yattara	Ararat-Armenia	Shirak	1–3 (A)	19 September 2023	
(Armenia) Artur Miranyan	Noah	West Armenia	5–1 (H)	29 November 2023	
(Armenia) Grenik Petrosyan	BKMA Yerevan	Van	7–1 (H)	30 November 2023	
(Nigeria) Yusuf Otubanjo	Pyunik	West Armenia	4–1 (A)	2 May 2024	

=== Own goals ===
- (Brazil) Leonardo da Silva - Ararat Yerevan vs Ararat-Armenia (30 July 2023)
- (Armenia) Hrayr Mkoyan - BKMA Yerevan vs Shirak (11 August 2023)
- (Nigeria) Julius Ufuoma - Ararat Yerevan vs West Armenia (12 August 2023)
- (Ivory Coast) Ipehe Williams - Van vs BKMA Yerevan (24 September 2023)
- (Brazil) Alemão - Ararat-Armenia vs Urartu (3 October 2023)
- (Russia) Vladimir Kharatyan - Ararat-Armenia vs West Armenia (24 October 2023)
- (Ukraine) Ivan Zotko - BKMA Yerevan vs Urartu (4 December 2023)
- (Armenia) Seryozha Urushanyan - Van vs Shirak (9 December 2023)
- (Armenia) Norayr Nikoghosyan - BKMA Yerevan vs Alashkert (27 February 2024)
- (Serbia) Aleksandar Miljković - Noah vs Alashkert (4 May 2024)
- (Armenia) Mark Avetisyan - BKMA Yerevan vs Alashkert (14 May 2024)

=== Clean sheets ===
As of match played 26 May 2024

Rank	Player	Club	Clean sheets
1	(Armenia) Stanislav Buchnev	Pyunik	12
1	(Armenia) Ognjen Čančarević	Alashkert/Noah	10
3	(Serbia) Darko Vukašinović	Shirak	7
3	(Brazil) Tiago Gomes	Ararat Yerevan	7
4	(Italy) Valerio Vimercati	Noah	6
4	(Armenia) Arsen Beglaryan	Ararat-Armenia	6
7	(Russia) Nikolai Rybikov	West Armenia	5
7	(Armenia) Arman Nersesyan	BKMA Yerevan	5
9	(Republic of the Congo) Christoffer Mafoumbi	Noah	4
9	(Brazil) Filipe	West Armenia	4
9	(Russia) Aleksandr Melikhov	Urartu	4
9	(Serbia) Miloš Čupić	Van	4

=== Discipline ===
==== Red cards ====
As of match played 26 May 2024

- (Russia) Zalim Makoyev - West Armenia vs Shirak (29 July 2023)
- (Guinea-Bissau) Mimito Biai - Alashkert vs Pyunik (31 July 2023)
- (Serbia) Aleksandar Miljković - Noah vs BKMA Yerevan (4 August 2023)
- (Serbia) Aleksandar Miljković - Noah vs Shirak (18 August 2023)
- (Brazil) Marcos Júnior - Urartu vs Pyunik (20 August 2023)
- (Armenia) Edgar Malakyan - Urartu vs Pyunik (20 August 2023)
- (Nigeria) Tenton Yenne - Ararat-Armenia vs Pyunik (23 August 2023)
- (Armenia) Sergey Muradyan - Alashkert vs Noah (25 August 2023)
- (Nigeria) Christopher Boniface - Ararat-Armenia vs Van (27 August 2023)
- Edmon Movsisyan - Pyunik vs West Armenia (28 August 2023)
- (Tunisia) Rayane Mzoughi - Noah vs Ararat Yerevan (31 August 2023)
- (Colombia) Daniel Cifuentes - Van vs Pyunik (2 September 2023)
- (Armenia) Edgar Malakyan - Noah vs Ararat Yerevan (21 September 2023)
- (Nigeria) Deou Dosa - Van vs BKMA Yerevan (24 September 2023)
- (Ukraine) Serhiy Vakulenko - Pyunik vs Shirak (25 September 2023)
- Artak Yedigaryan - Ararat-Armenia vs Alashkert (25 September 2023)
- Edmon Movsisyan - West Armenia vs Noah (26 September 2023)
- (Armenia) Narek Manukyan - Noah vs BKMA Yerevan (5 October 2023)
- (Nigeria) Deou Dosa - Ararat Yerevan vs Van (24 October 2023)
- (Armenia) Robert Darbinyan - Alashkert vs Shirak (4 November 2023)
- (Kenya) Amos Nondi - Noah vs Ararat-Armenia (7 November 2023)
- (Armenia) Razmik Hakobyan - Shirak vs Ararat Yerevan (8 November 2023)
- (Armenia) Volodya Samsonyan - Shirak vs Ararat Yerevan (8 November 2023)
- (Brazil) Marcos Júnior - Van vs Urartu (12 November 2023)
- (Ukraine) Yevhen Tsymbalyuk - Van vs Urartu (12 November 2023)
- (Nigeria) Chukwuebuka Okoronkwo - Van vs Urartu (12 November 2023)
- (Brazil) Pablo Santos - Noah vs Urartu (22 February 2024)
- (Armenia) Misak Hakobyan - BKMA Yerevan vs Alashkert (27 February 2024)
- (Armenia) Narek Aghasaryan - Urartu vs Pyunik (27 February 2024)
- (Senegal) Alfred N'Diaye - Alashkert vs Noah (2 March 2024)
- Karen Muradyan - Ararat-Armenia vs Van (3 March 2024)
- (Nigeria) Sodiq Fatai - Alashkert vs Urartu (16 March 2024)
- (Serbia) Darko Vukasinovic - West Armenia vs Shirak (14 April 2024)
- (Montenegro) Periša Pešukić - Ararat-Armenia vs Urartu (17 April 2024)
- (Armenia) Ognjen Čančarević - Shirak vs Noah (27 April 2024)
- (Georgia (country)) Revaz Chiteishvili - Alashkert vs Shirak (10 May 2024)
- (Nigeria) Ibrahim Yahaya - Van vs West Armenia (14 May 2024)
- (Russia) Armen Ambartsumyan - Noah vs Ararat-Armenia (16 May 2024)
- (Ivory Coast) Mory Kone - Shirak vs Pyunik (25 May 2024)

== Awards ==
=== Annual awards ===
Award	Winner	Club	Ref
Manager of the Season	(Armenia) Yegishe Melikyan	Pyunik	
Player of the Season	(Nigeria) Tenton Yenne	Ararat-Armenia	
Goal of the Season	(Armenia) Hovhannes Harutyunyan	Pyunik	
