= 2021–22 Armenian Premier League =

Armenian Premier League
- Season: 2021–22
- Dates: 30 July 2021 – 28 May 2022
- Champions: Pyunik (15th title)
- Relegated: Sevan
- Champions League: Pyunik
- Europa Conference League: Ararat-Armenia; Alashkert; Ararat Yerevan
- Matches: 144
- Goals: 348 (2.42 per match)
- Top goalscorer: Serges Déblé (22 goals)
- Biggest home win: Ararat Yerevan 7–1 Noah (2 August 2021); Noravank 7–1 Van (12 April 2022)
- Biggest away win: BKMA Yerevan 0–4 Pyunik (30 July 2021); Van 0–4 Alashkert (31 October 2021); Pyunik 2–6 Ararat Yerevan (11 December 2021)
- Highest scoring: Ararat Yerevan 7–1 Noah (2 August 2021); Pyunik 2–6 Ararat Yerevan (11 December 2021); Noravank 7–1 Van (12 April 2022)
- Longest winning run: 7 matches Ararat-Armenia
- Longest unbeaten run: 16 matches Pyunik
- Longest winless run: 13 matches Noravank
- Longest losing run: 8 matches BKMA Yerevan
- (Note: Longest runs include results involving Sevan.)

The 2021–22 Armenian Premier League, known as the VBET Armenian Premier League (Armenian: VBET Հայաստանի Պրեմիեր Լիգա) for sponsorship reasons, was the 30th season of the league since its establishment.

== Season events ==
On 9 July 2021, the Football Federation of Armenia announced that 10 teams would play in the 2021–22 season of the Armenian Premier League. BKMA Yerevan, Noravank and Sevan where all promoted to the Premier League and given licenses, replacing Gandzasar Kapan and Lori who'd previously withdrawn from the league the previous season, and Shirak who were relegated.

On 1 December, the Football Federation of Armenia Disciplinary Committee voted in favor to remove Sevan from the Armenian Premier League after they failed to turn up for two games in a row, against Alashkert and BKMA Yerevan. As a result, all of Sevan's results were excluded from the championship table.

== Teams ==
Locations of the teams

Club	Location	Stadium	Capacity
Alashkert	Yerevan (Shengavit)	Alashkert Stadium	6,850
Ararat Yerevan	Yerevan (Kentron)	Vazgen Sargsyan Republican Stadium	14,403
Ararat-Armenia	Yerevan (Avan)	Yerevan Football Academy Stadium^{1}	1,428
BKMA	Yerevan (Avan)	Yerevan Football Academy Stadium^{1}	1,428
Noah	Armavir	Armavir City Stadium^{1}	3,100
Noravank	Vayk	Charentsavan City Stadium^{2}	5,000
Pyunik	Yerevan (Kentron)	Vazgen Sargsyan Republican Stadium	14,403
Sevan	Sevan	Gegharkunik Province^{2}	500
Urartu	Yerevan (Malatia-Sebastia)	Urartu Stadium	4,860
Van	Charentsavan	Charentsavan City Stadium	5,000

- ^{1}Noah played their home games for the first half of the season at the Yerevan Football Academy Stadium, Yerevan, instead of their home venue Mika Stadium, Yerevan.
  For the second half of the season they played their home games at the Armavir City Stadium in Armavir.
- ^{2}Noravank play their home games at the Charentsavan City Stadium, Charentsavan until the second half of the season, due to the rebuilding of their regular venue Arevik Stadium, Vayk.
- ^{3}Sevan play their home games at Alashkert Stadium, Yerevan, instead of their home venue Sevan City Stadium, Sevan.

=== Personnel and sponsorship ===
Team	Manager	Captain	Kit manufacturer	Shirt sponsor
Alashkert	(Armenia) Aram Voskanyan	(Armenia) Artak Grigoryan	Sport-Saller	Marsbet
Ararat Yerevan	(Armenia) Edgar Torosyan	(Armenia) Hrayr Mkoyan	Fourteen	TotoGaming
Ararat-Armenia	(Russia) Dmitri Gunko	(Armenia) Armen Ambartsumyan	Puma	Tashir Group
BKMA	(Armenia) Rafael Nazaryan	(Armenia) Hayk Ishkhanyan	Macron	Armed forces of Armenia
Noah	(Armenia) Abraham Khashmanyan	(Armenia) Jordy Monroy	Adidas	VBET
Noravank	(Armenia) Vahe Gevorgyan	(Armenia) Andranik Kocharyan	Macron	
Pyunik	(Armenia) Yegishe Melikyan	(Armenia) Arman Hovhannisyan	Joma	VBET
Sevan			Adidas	TotoGaming
Urartu	(Armenia) Robert Arzumanyan (acting)	(Armenia) Hakob Hakobyan	Jako	
Van	(Armenia) Sevada Arzumanyan	(Armenia) Arman Meliksetyan	Puma	VBET

=== Managerial changes ===
Team	Outgoing manager	Manner of departure	Date of vacancy	Position in table	Incoming manager	Date of appointment
Alashkert	Aleksandr Grigoryan	Mutual termination	22 July 2021	Pre-season	Aleksandr Grigoryan	31 July 2021
Sevan	Armen Shahgeldyan	Mutual termination	8 August 2021	5th	Pambos Christodoulou	11 August 2021
Alashkert	Aleksandr Grigoryan	Mutual termination	20 September 2021	9th	Milan Milanović	26 September 2021
Urartu	Arsen Petrosyan	Moved to Academy position	17 November 2021	6th	Robert Arzumanyan (acting)	17 November 2021
Ararat Yerevan	Vardan Bichakhchyan	Mutual termination	11 January 2022	3rd	Edgar Torosyan	25 January 2022
Alashkert	Milan Milanović	Contract expired	13 January 2022	5th	Aram Voskanyan	13 January 2022
Noah	Viktor Bulatov	Contract terminated	21 March 2022	6th	Igor Picușceac	25 March 2022

== League table ==
Pos	Team	Pld	W	D	L	GF	GA	GD	Pts	Qualification or relegation
1	Pyunik (C)	32	23	6	3	52	25	+27	75	Qualification for the Champions League first qualifying round
2	Ararat-Armenia	32	23	5	4	56	20	+36	74	Qualification for the Europa Conference League second qualifying round (Note: The 2021–22 Armenian Cup winners, Noravank, did not obtain an UEFA license and was replaced.)
3	Alashkert	32	14	9	9	38	30	+8	51	Qualification for the Europa Conference League first qualifying round
4	Ararat Yerevan	32	13	7	12	47	36	+11	46	Qualification for the Europa Conference League first qualifying round
5	Urartu	32	9	13	10	37	32	+5	40	
6	Noah	32	9	12	11	38	43	−5	39	
7	Noravank	32	7	7	18	36	55	−19	28	
8	Van	32	6	7	19	19	47	−28	25	
9	BKMA (O)	32	4	6	22	25	60	−35	18	Qualification to the relegation play-offs
10	Sevan (D, R)	0	0	0	0	0	0	0	0	Relegation to the Armenian First League (Note: Sevan was expelled from the league on 1 December 2021.)

Source: FFA Soccerway
Rules for classification: 1) Points; 2) Head-to-head points; 3) Head-to-head goal difference; 4) Head-to-head goals scored; 5) Matches won; 6) Goal difference; 7) Less red cards; 8) Less yellow cards; 9) Fair-play ranking 10) Draw
(C) Champions; (D) Disqualified; (O) Play-off winners; (R) Relegated

== Fixtures and results ==
=== Round 1–16 ===
Home \ Away	ALA	ARA	AAR	BKM	NOA	NOR	PYU	URA	VAN
Alashkert	—	1–0	0–3	2–1	0–0	0–0	1–4	2–1	0–2
Ararat Yerevan	3–2	—	0–1	3–2	7–1	3–2	0–1	2–0	1–0
Ararat-Armenia	2–1	3–0	—	2–1	5–2	2–1	1–2	3–0	2–0
BKMA	0–2	0–2	2–3	—	1–2	2–0	0–4	1–2	1–0
Noah	0–1	2–2	0–1	5–0	—	2–1	1–2	1–1	3–0
Noravank	0–2	1–1	0–2	1–1	1–1	—	2–1	0–1	1–0
Pyunik	1–1	2–6	0–3	1–0	1–0	2–0	—	2–0	1–1
Urartu	0–0	1–1	0–0	5–0	0–1	3–0	0–2	—	1–0
Van	0–4	0–1	1–2	1–0	1–2	2–0	0–2	1–1	—

Source: Soccerway
Legend: Blue = home team win; Yellow = draw; Red = away team win.

=== Round 17–32 ===
Home \ Away	ALA	ARA	AAR	BKM	NOA	NOR	PYU	URA	VAN
Alashkert	—	2–1	0–1	3–1	0–2	3–0	1–1	1–1	2–0
Ararat Yerevan	0–1	—	0–1	1–2	1–1	4–0	1–2	0–0	1–1
Ararat-Armenia	1–1	3–1	—	0–0	0–1	2–0	1–1	1–1	1–0
BKMA	0–3	3–2	0–1	—	1–1	0–1	0–1	1–4	1–1
Noah	1–0	0–0	0–3	1–1	—	3–3	0–1	1–1	0–0
Noravank	1–1	0–1	0–2	3–2	3–1	—	1–2	3–2	7–1
Pyunik	3–0	1–0	1–0	1–0	2–1	3–2	—	1–1	2–0
Urartu	0–0	1–2	1–2	1–0	2–2	1–1	0–1	—	2–0
Van	0–1	0–1	2–1	1–1	1–0	2–1	1–1	0–3	—

Source: Soccerway
Legend: Blue = home team win; Yellow = draw; Red = away team win.

== Season statistics ==
=== Top scorers ===
Rank	Player	Club	Goals
1	(Ivory Coast) Serges Déblé	Ararat Yerevan; Pyunik	22
2	(Cape Verde) Mailson Lima	Ararat-Armenia	18
3	(Portugal) Hugo Firmino	Pyunik	16
4	(Nigeria) Shuaibu Ibrahim	Noravank	10
4	(Armenia) Artur Miranyan	Urartu	10
6	(Russia) Maksim Mayrovich	Noah	9
6	(Nigeria) Yusuf Otubanjo	Ararat-Armenia	9
8	(Venezuela) José Caraballo	Pyunik	8
8	(Ivory Coast) Wilfried Eza	Ararat-Armenia	8
10	(Guinea-Bissau) José Embaló	Alashkert	7
10	(Armenia) Edgar Malakyan	Ararat Yerevan	7

=== Hat-tricks ===
Player	For	Against	Result	Date	Ref
(Ivory Coast) Yacouba Silue	Ararat Yerevan	Noah	6–1 (H)	2 August 2021	
(Haiti) Jonel Désiré	Urartu	BKMA Yerevan	5–0 (H)	17 November 2021	
(Ivory Coast) Serges Déblé	Pyunik	Alashkert	4–1 (A)	21 February 2022	
(Nigeria) Shuaibu Ibrahim	Noravank	Noah	3–1 (H)	19 March 2022	

=== Clean sheets ===
As of match played 16 March 2022

Rank	Player	Club	Clean sheets
1	(Italy) Valerio Vimercati	Ararat-Armenia	13
2	(Serbia) Ognjen Čančarević	Alashkert	8
3	(Armenia) Stanislav Buchnev	Pyunik	7
3	(Russia) Vsevolod Yermakov	Ararat Yerevan	7
5	(Armenia) Arsen Beglaryan	Urartu	5
6	(Armenia) David Yurchenko	Alashkert; Pyunik	4
7	(Russia) Grigori Matevosyan	Noah	3
7	(Armenia) Arman Meliksetyan	Van	3
7	(Armenia) Arman Nersisyan	BKMA Yerevan	3
10	(Serbia) Dusan Cubrakovic	Noravank	2

== Awards ==
=== Annual awards ===
Award	Winner	Club
Manager of the Season	(Armenia) Yegishe Melikyan	Pyunik
Player of the Season	(Portugal) Hugo Firmino	Pyunik
