= 2024–25 FC Pyunik season =

Pyunik
2024-25 season
- Chairman: Rafik Hayrapetyan
- Manager: Yegishe Melikyan
- Stadium: Republican Stadium
- Premier League: 4th
- Armenian Cup: Semi-finals
- Armenian Supercup: Runners Up
- UEFA Champions League: First qualifying round
- UEFA Conference League: Playoff round
- Top goalscorer: League: Yusuf Otubanjo (14); All: Yusuf Otubanjo (16)
Home colours	Away colours

The 2024–25 season was Pyunik's 31st season in the Armenian Premier League.

== Season overview ==
On 6 July, Pyunik announced the signing of Taron Voskanyan from Alashkert and Martim Maia from Santa Clara.

On 7 July, Pyunik announced the signing of João Paredes from Feirense, Agdon Menezes and Alemão from Ararat-Armenia and Vladyslav Kulach who'd most recently played for Zira in Azerbaijan.

On 3 August, Pyunik announced the signing of Sani Buhari from Van. The next day, 4 August, Vladyslav Kulach left Pyunik less than a month after signing, citing "Personal Reasons".

On 19 August, Pyunik announced the signing of Bryan Alceus from Doxa Katokopias.

23 December, Pyunik announced the departure of José Caraballo, Eugeniu Cociuc and Juan Bravo.

17 January, Pyunik announced the departure of James Santos, João Paredes and Henri Avagyan.

On 19 January, Pyunik announced the signing of Artur Grigoryan who'd most recently played for Ararat Yerevan.

On 24 January, Pyunik announced the return of Varazdat Haroyan from Qingdao West Coast. The following day, 25 January, Pyunik announced the signing of Joël Bopesu from Žalgiris.

On 26 January, Pyunik announced the signing of Temur Dzhikiya from Volga Ulyanovsk, and the loan signing of Nikita Alekseyev from Ural Yekaterinburg until 30 June.

On 27 January, Pyunik extended their contract with Yegishe Melikyan until the end of the 2025–26 season.

On 1 February, Pyunik announced the signing of Matas Vareika from Hegelmann and Daniil Kulikov from Dinamo Minsk.

On 25 March, Pyunik announced the signing of Mimito Biai from Emirates.

== Squad ==
As of match played 23 May 2025

Number	Name	Nationality	Position	Date of birth (age)	Signed from	Signed in	Contract ends	Apps.	Goals
Goalkeepers
32	Sergey Mikaelyan	(Armenia)	GK	21 July 2002 (aged 22)	Academy	2020		3	0
71	Stanislav Buchnev	(Armenia)	GK	17 July 1990 (aged 34)	Fakel Voronezh	2020		125	0
98	Nikita Alekseyev	(Russia)	GK	9 January 2002 (aged 23)	on loan from Ural Yekaterinburg	2025	2025	1	0
Defenders
3	Arman Hovhannisyan	(Armenia)	DF	7 July 1993 (aged 31)	Ararat Yerevan	2023		125	0
5	Varazdat Haroyan	(Armenia)	DF	24 August 1992 (aged 32)	Qingdao West Coast	2025		189	8
6	Juninho	(Brazil)	DF	29 July 1995 (aged 29)	Unattached	2021		123	9
11	Joël Bopesu	(Democratic Republic of the Congo)	DF	25 January 1995 (aged 30)	Žalgiris	2025		12	3
15	Mikhail Kovalenko	(Russia)	DF	25 January 1995 (aged 30)	Olimp-Dolgoprudny	2022		112	8
22	Alemão	(Brazil)	DF	7 December 1992 (aged 32)	Unattached	2024		34	0
33	Taron Voskanyan	(Armenia)	DF	22 February 1993 (aged 32)	Alashkert	2024		198	5
45	Marat Asatryan	(Armenia)	DF	15 December 2005 (aged 19)	Academy	2021		1	0
49	Aram Aharonyan	(Armenia)	DF	26 February 2007 (aged 18)	Academy	2023		1	0
79	Serhiy Vakulenko	(Ukraine)	DF	7 September 1993 (aged 31)	Ararat-Armenia	2022		61	0
95	Anton Bratkov	(Ukraine)	DF	14 May 1993 (aged 32)	Metalist 1925 Kharkiv	2021		139	2
Midfielders
4	Solomon Udo	(Armenia)	MF	14 December 1997 (aged 27)	Unattached	2024		46	0
7	Edgar Malakyan	(Armenia)	MF	22 September 1990 (aged 34)	Unattached	2023			
10	Artur Grigoryan	(Armenia)	MF	10 July 1993 (aged 31)	Unattached	2025		53	0
17	Levon Petrosyan	(Armenia)	MF	24 March 2004 (aged 21)	Academy	2020		12	2
20	Lucas Villela	(Brazil)	MF	24 March 1994 (aged 31)	Unattached	2023		58	6
23	Vagner Gonçalves	(Brazil)	MF	27 April 1996 (aged 29)	Dinamo Tbilisi	2024		51	7
24	Mimito Biai	(Guinea-Bissau)	MF	12 December 1997 (aged 27)	Emirates	2025		7	0
25	Daniil Kulikov	(Russia)	MF	24 June 1998 (aged 26)	Dinamo Minsk	2025		15	1
31	Hamlet Aleksanyan	(Armenia)	MF	3 September 2006 (aged 18)	Academy	2022		1	0
35	Petros Alekyan	(Armenia)	MF	25 December 2005 (aged 19)	Academy	2024		2	1
38	Tigran Gevorgyan	(Armenia)	MF	28 September 2006 (aged 18)	Academy	2023		1	1
41	Zhirayr Ashikian	(Armenia)	MF	7 November 2008 (aged 16)	Academy	2024		1	0
48	Ruben Karapetyan	(Armenia)	MF	14 August 2008 (aged 16)	Academy	2024		1	0
50	Narek Baroyan	(Armenia)	MF	5 May 2005 (aged 20)	Lori	2021		2	0
52	Samson Hakobyan	(Armenia)	MF	10 September 2006 (aged 18)	Academy	2023		1	0
62	Davit Davtyan	(Armenia)	MF	10 June 2008 (aged 16)	Academy	2024		1	0
66	Martim Maia	(Portugal)	MF	24 May 1998 (aged 26)	Santa Clara	2024		15	0
67	Vardan Melikyan	(Armenia)	MF	12 February 2008 (aged 17)	Academy	2024		1	0
92	Bryan Alceus	(Haiti)	MF	1 February 1996 (aged 29)	Doxa Katokopias	2024		18	0
97	David Davidyan	(Armenia)	MF	14 December 1997 (aged 27)	Khimki	2023	2025	98	2
99	Temur Dzhikiya	(Russia)	MF	8 May 1998 (aged 27)	Volga Ulyanovsk	2025		12	7
Forwards
8	Serges Déblé	(Ivory Coast)	FW	1 October 1989 (aged 35)	Unattached	2024		50	19
9	Matas Vareika	(Lithuania)	FW	27 January 2000 (aged 25)	Hegelmann	2025		16	8
14	Yusuf Otubanjo	(Nigeria)	FW	12 September 1992 (aged 32)	Ararat-Armenia	2022	2025	121	58
21	Agdon Menezes	(Brazil)	FW	26 January 1993 (aged 32)	Ararat-Armenia	2024		31	6
73	Artyom Aleksanyan	(Armenia)	FW	20 December 2008 (aged 16)	Academy	2024		1	0
77	Sani Buhari	(Nigeria)	FW	10 January 2004 (aged 21)	Van	2024		30	4
Players away on loan
48	Hrachya Sargsyan	(Armenia)	DF	12 May 2006 (aged 19)	Academy	2024		2	0
53	Artur Manukyan	(Armenia)	MF	7 September 2006 (aged 18)	Academy	2022		1	0
60	Ishkhan Darbinyan	(Armenia)	DF	10 April 2004 (aged 21)	Academy	2021		1	0
83	Vyacheslav Afyan	(Armenia)	MF	28 October 2005 (aged 19)	Academy	2022		1	0
85	Karlen Hovhannisyan	(Armenia)	MF	26 April 2005 (aged 20)	Academy	2023		1	0
89	Aris Karapetyan	(Armenia)	FW	24 May 2005 (aged 19)	Academy	2022		0	0
	Mark Avetisyan	(Armenia)	DF	24 June 2005 (aged 19)	Academy	2022		0	0
	Artur Mikhaelyan	(Armenia)	DF	3 February 2006 (aged 19)	Academy	2023		0	0
	Aleksandr Petrosyan	(Armenia)	DF		Academy	2024		0	0
Players who left during the season
2	Luka Juričić	(Bosnia and Herzegovina)	FW	25 November 1996 (aged 28)	on loan from CFR Cluj	2024	2024	59	29
5	James Santos	(Brazil)	DF	15 July 1995 (aged 29)	Unattached	2023		72	9
9	João Paredes	(Portugal)	FW	1 January 1996 (aged 29)	Feirense	2024		13	0
10	Artak Grigoryan	(Armenia)	MF	19 October 1987 (aged 37)	Unattached	2023		42	1
16	Henri Avagyan	(Armenia)	GK	16 January 1996 (aged 29)	BKMA Yerevan	2022		29	0
18	José Caraballo	(Venezuela)	FW	21 February 1996 (aged 29)	Unattached	2022		129	22
19	Levon Vardanyan	(Armenia)	FW	2 November 2003 (aged 21)	Academy	2019	2025	38	1
29	Eugeniu Cociuc	(Moldova)	MF	11 May 1993 (aged 32)	Zimbru Chișinău	2024		53	4
44	Juan Bravo	(Colombia)	DF	1 April 1990 (aged 35)	Unattacehd	2023		40	6
90	Vladyslav Kulach	(Ukraine)	FW	7 May 1993 (aged 32)	Unattacehd	2024		0	0

== Transfers ==
=== In ===
Date	Position	Nationality	Name	From	Fee	Ref.
6 July 2024	DF	(Armenia)	Taron Voskanyan	Alashkert	Undisclosed	
6 July 2024	MF	(Portugal)	Martim Maia	Santa Clara	Undisclosed	
7 July 2024	FW	(Portugal)	João Paredes	Feirense	Undisclosed	
7 July 2024	DF	(Brazil)	Alemão	Unattached	Free	
7 July 2024	FW	(Brazil)	Agdon Menezes	Ararat-Armenia	Undisclosed	
7 July 2024	MF	(Ukraine)	Vladyslav Kulach	Unattached	Free	
3 August 2024	FW	(Nigeria)	Sani Buhari	Van	Undisclosed	
19 August 2024	MF	(Haiti)	Bryan Alceus	Doxa Katokopias	Undisclosed	
19 January 2025	MF	(Armenia)	Artur Grigoryan	Unattached	Free	
24 January 2025	DF	(Armenia)	Varazdat Haroyan	Qingdao West Coast	Undisclosed	
25 January 2025	DF	(Democratic Republic of the Congo)	Joël Bopesu	Žalgiris	Undisclosed	
26 January 2025	MF	(Russia)	Temur Dzhikiya	Volga Ulyanovsk	Undisclosed	
1 February 2025	MF	(Russia)	Daniil Kulikov	Dinamo Minsk	Undisclosed	
1 February 2025	FW	(Lithuania)	Matas Vareika	Hegelmann	Undisclosed	
25 March 2025	MF	(Guinea-Bissau)	Mimito Biai	Emirates	Undisclosed	

=== Loans in ===
Date from	Position	Nationality	Name	From	Date to	Ref.
26 January 2025	GK	(Russia)	Nikita Alekseyev	Ural Yekaterinburg	30 June 2025	

=== Out ===
Date	Position	Nationality	Name	To	Fee	Ref.
27 June 2024	FW	(Armenia)	Grenik Petrosyan	Noah	Undisclosed	

=== Loans out ===
Date from	Position	Nationality	Name	To	Date to	Ref.
19 June 2024	DF	(Armenia)	Hrachya Sargsyan	BKMA Yerevan	End of season	
21 June 2024	DF	(Armenia)	Artur Mikhaelyan	BKMA Yerevan	End of season	
21 June 2024	DF	(Armenia)	Aleksandr Petrosyan	BKMA Yerevan	End of season	
13 February 2025	MF	(Armenia)	Artur Manukyan	BKMA Yerevan	End of season	
20 February 2025	DF	(Armenia)	Ishkhan Darbinyan	West Armenia	End of season	

=== Released ===
Date	Position	Nationality	Name	Joined	Date	Ref
1 June 2024	MF	(Armenia)	Artak Dashyan	Noah	1 June 2024	
11 June 2024	DF	(Bosnia and Herzegovina)	Tarik Isić	Sloboda Tuzla		
11 June 2024	FW	(Netherlands)	Sam Hendriks			
4 July 2024	MF	(Armenia)	Harutyun Asatryan			
4 July 2024	DF	(Armenia)	Ashot Mikaelyan			
4 July 2024	MF	(Armenia)	Armen Adamyan			
4 July 2024	FW	(Armenia)	Vrezh Chiloyan			
3 August 2024	FW	(Netherlands)	Levon Vardanyan	Van	3 August 2024	
4 August 2024	MF	(Ukraine)	Vladyslav Kulach	Vorskla Poltava	23 January 2025	
23 December 2024	DF	(Colombia)	Juan Bravo	West Armenia	23 February 2025	
23 December 2024	MF	(Moldova)	Eugeniu Cociuc	Bălți	23 August 2025	
23 December 2024	FW	(Venezuela)	José Caraballo	Deportivo La Guaira	14 February 2025	
13 January 2025	GK	(Armenia)	Henri Avagyan	Ararat-Armenia	13 January 2025	
16 January 2025	DF	(Brazil)	James Santos	Noah	16 January 2025	
17 January 2025	FW	(Portugal)	João Paredes	Manama Club		
28 May 2025	FW	(Armenia)	Artur Grigoryan	Ararat Yerevan	30 June 2025	

== Friendlies ==
2 February 2025	Ural Yekaterinburg	4–1	Pyunik	Abu Dhabi, United Arab Emirates
17:30 (UTC+4)	Goal	Report	Déblé

5 February 2025	Falcon	1–3	Pyunik	Abu Dhabi, United Arab Emirates
11:00 (UTC+4)	Goal	Report	Buhari; Davidyan; Dzhikiya

8 February 2025	Ural Yekaterinburg	0–1	Pyunik	Abu Dhabi, United Arab Emirates
17:00 (UTC+4)		Report	Agdon

11 February 2025	Zenit St.Petersburg	2–0	Pyunik	Abu Dhabi, United Arab Emirates
11:00 (UTC+4)	Yerokhin 38'; Alip (yellow card) 74'; Sobolev 86'	Report		Stadium: Emirates Palace

== Competitions ==
=== Overview ===
Competition	First match	Last match	Starting round	Final position	Record							
Competition	First match	Last match	Starting round	Final position	Pld	W	D	L	GF	GA	GD	Win %
Premier League	5 August 2024	23 May 2025	Matchday 1	4th	30	17	2	11	59	36	+23	56.67
Armenian Cup	5 March 2025	29 April 2025	Quarter-final	Semi-final	4	3	0	1	14	6	+8	75.00
Armenian Supercup	9 April 2025	9 April 2025	Final	Runnerup	1	0	0	1	0	4	−4	0.00
UEFA Champions League	10 July 2024	16 July 2024	First qualifying round	First qualifying round	2	0	1	1	0	1	−1	0.00
UEFA Conference League	24 July 2024	29 August 2024	Second qualifying round	Playoff round	6	4	0	2	8	7	+1	66.67
Total					43	24	3	16	81	54	+27	55.81

Last updated: 23 May 2025
Source: Competitions

=== Armenian Supercup ===
9 April 2025	Pyunik	0–4	Ararat-Armenia	Yerevan
19:00 (UTC+4)	Haroyan (yellow card) 15'; Udo (yellow card) 60'; Bratkov (yellow card) 72'; Dzhikiya (yellow card) 75'; Kovalenko (yellow card) 90+4'	Report	Noubissi 3', 77'; Yenne 8'; Bratkov 40' (o.g.)	Stadium: Republican Stadium; Referee: Hovhannes Kalantaryan
Note: Match postponed on 20 February 2025 due to bad weather conditions. Match rearranged on 21 March 2025, for 9 April 2025.

=== Premier League ===
==== Results summary ====
Overall								Home						Away					
Pld	W	D	L	GF	GA	GD	Pts	W	D	L	GF	GA	GD	W	D	L	GF	GA	GD
30	17	2	11	59	37	+22	53	8	1	6	30	21	+9	9	1	5	29	16	+13

Last updated: 23 May 2025.
Source: See Results

==== Results by round ====
Round	1	3	5	6	7	8	9	2	10	11	12	13	14	4	16	17	15	18	19	20	21	22	23	24	25	26	27	28	29	30	31	32	33
Ground	A	H	H	A	H	A	H	A	A	-	A	H	A	A	-	H	H	A	H	A	H	H	H	A	H	A	H	A	H	A	H	A	-
Result	D	L	W	W	W	L	W	W	W	P	W	W	W	W	P	W	L	L	W	W	L	L	W	L	D	W	L	W	L	L	W	L	P
Position	5	6	3	2	1	4	1	3	1	3	3	3	2	4	3	3	3	4	3	3	3	3	3	4	4	4	4	4	4	4	4	4	4

Updated to match(es) played on 23 May 2025. Source: See Results
A = Away; H = Home; W = Win; D = Draw; L = Loss; P = Bye

==== Results ====
5 August 2024 1	Urartu	0–0	Pyunik	Yerevan
19:00 (UTC+4)	Simonyan (yellow card) 45'; Gilmore (yellow card) 56'; Margaryan (yellow card) 68'; Isaac (yellow card) 90'	Report	Caraballo (yellow card) 45'; Agdon (yellow card) 45+1'; Davidyan (yellow card) 50'	Stadium: Urartu Stadium; Referee: Ashot Ghaltakhchyan

18 August 2024 3	Pyunik	0–2	Alashkert	Yerevan
18:00 (UTC+4)		Report	Patsatsia 18' (yellow card) 39'; Bangura (yellow card) 46'; Embaló (yellow card) 55'; Katoh 77'; Manucharyan (yellow card) 90'	Stadium: Junior Sports Stadium; Referee: Vardan Vardumyan

1 September 2024 5	Pyunik	2–0	Shirak	Yerevan
16:30 (UTC+4)	Bratkov (yellow card) 13'; Buhari (yellow card) 41'; James (yellow card) 45+5'; Cociuc 69' (pen.); Otubanjo 84'	Report	Kone (yellow card) 45+5'; Mkrtchyan (yellow card) 47'; Darbinyan (yellow card) 68'	Stadium: Junior Sports Stadium; Referee: Artem Gasparyan

13 September 2024 6	West Armenia	1–3	Pyunik	Yerevan
19:00 (UTC+4)	Chimezie (yellow card) 30'; Danielyan (yellow card) 32' (goal) 65'; Dramé (yellow card) 53'; Yusuf (yellow card) 72'; Rudoselsky (yellow card) 78'	Report	Agdon 5'; Vakulenko (yellow card) 32'; Otubanjo 38'; Déblé 87'	Stadium: Junior Sports Stadium; Referee: Zaven Hovhannisyan

20 September 2024 7	Pyunik	4–1	BKMA Yerevan	Yerevan
19:00 (UTC+4)	Agdon 21'; Juninho 50'; Otubanjo 62' (pen.); James (red card) 72'; Déblé 85'	Report	Arakelyan 33' (yellow card) 46'; Avetisyan (yellow card) 83'	Stadium: Junior Sports Stadium; Referee: Yura Mahtesyan

24 September 2024 8	Noah	2–0	Pyunik	Abovyan
19:00 (UTC+4)	Gamboš (yellow card) 27'; Manvelyan (yellow card) 45+8'; Gregório 46'; Pinson 60'; Čančarević (yellow card) 83'	Report	Otubanjo (yellow card) 45'; Bratkov (yellow card) 57'; Udo (yellow card) 63'	Stadium: City Stadium; Referee: Henrik Nalbandian

28 September 2024 9	Pyunik	3–0	Ararat Yerevan	Yerevan
18:00 (UTC+4)	Buhari 26'; Grigoryan (yellow card) 35'; Déblé 45+3' (pen.); Otubanjo 71'	Report	Malakyan (yellow card) 29'; Goore (yellow card) 37'	Stadium: Junior Sports Stadium; Referee: Yura Mahtesyan

3 October 2024 2	Ararat-Armenia	1–3	Pyunik	Yerevan
18:00 (UTC+4)	Noubissi (yellow card) 28'; Yenne 37' (pen.) (yellow card) 61'; Nondi (red card) 41'	Report	Otubanjo 58' (pen.); Agdon 76'; Buhari 83'	Stadium: Yerevan Football Academy Stadium; Referee: Artem Gasparyan

6 October 2024 10	Van	1–3	Pyunik	Charentsavan
14:30 (UTC+4)	Touré (yellow card) 42'; Drammeh 86'	Report	Agdon (yellow card) 31' (goal) 33'; Caraballo 45'; Kovalenko (yellow card) 47'; Otubanjo (yellow card) 50'; James 77'	Stadium: City Stadium; Referee: Ashot Ghaltakhchyan

11	Bye
(UTC+4)

23 October 2024 12	BKMA Yerevan	1–2	Pyunik	Yerevan
18:00 (UTC+4)	Hovhannisyan 36'; Eloyan (yellow card) 45'; Petrosyan (yellow card) 63'; Aghbalyan (yellow card) 74'; Ayvazyan (yellow card) 90+4'	Report	Otubanjo 23', 25' (yellow card) 73'	Stadium: Yerevan Football Academy Stadium; Referee: Vardan Manukyan

28 October 2024 13	Pyunik	1–0	Van	Yerevan
17:00 (UTC+4)	James 13'; Malakyan (yellow card) 88'	Report	Okonkwo (yellow card) 36'; John (yellow card) 53'; Matyukhin (yellow card) 70'	Stadium: Junior Sports Stadium; Referee: Artem Gasparyan

2 November 2024 14	Ararat Yerevan	0–2	Pyunik	Yerevan
17:00 (UTC+4)	Faye (yellow card) 50'; Dombila (yellow card) 90+1'	Report	Otubanjo 28'; Alceus (yellow card) 71'; Déblé 81'; Juninho (yellow card) 90+4'	Stadium: Republican Stadium; Referee: Henrik Nalbandian

7 November 2024 4	Gandzasar Kapan	0–5	Pyunik	Yerevan
15:00 (UTC+4)	Faye (yellow card) 43'	Report	Agdon 8'; Vakulenko (yellow card) 35'; Otubanjo 45+1' (pen.), 78', 85'; Grigoryan 48'	Stadium: Junior Sports Stadium; Referee: Tiran Yeritsyan

16	Bye
(UTC+4)

21 November 2024 17	Pyunik	3–0	West Armenia	Yerevan
17:00 (UTC+4)		Report		Stadium: Junior Sports Stadium; Referee: Levon Vardapetyan
Note: The match was cancelled on 21 November after West Armenia did not attend due to a protest by their players over late payment of salaries. The match was awarded as a 3-0 technical defeat in favour of Pyunik on 6 December.

24 November 2024 15	Pyunik	1–3	Noah	Yerevan
19:00 (UTC+4)	Grigoryan (yellow card) 14'; Alemão (yellow card) 45'; Agdon (yellow card) 60'; Malakyan 88' (pen.); James (yellow card) 90+6'	Report	Mendoza (yellow card) 9' (goal) 80'; Pablo 41', 62'; Čančarević (yellow card) 89'; Aiás (yellow card) 90+3'	Stadium: Junior Sport Stadium; Referee: Henrik Nalbandian

28 November 2024 18	Shirak	1–0	Pyunik	Gyumri
19:00 (UTC+4)	Traore (yellow card) 45+5'; Kodia 67'; Darbinyan (yellow card) 90'	Report	Alemão (yellow card) 19'; Kovalenko (yellow card) 26'; James (yellow card) 45+1'; Buhari (yellow card) 65'	Stadium: City Stadium; Referee: Hovhannes Kalantaryan

2 December 2024 19	Pyunik	1–0	Gandzasar Kapan	Yerevan
18:00 (UTC+4)	Bratkov (yellow card) 9'; Déblé 90+5' (pen.)	Report	Mani (yellow card) 28'; Sawada (yellow card) 29'; Emmanuel (yellow card) 72'; Zakaryan (yellow card) 90+7'	Stadium: Junior Sport Stadium; Referee: Artak Vardanyan

25 February 2025 20	Alashkert	0–2	Pyunik	Yerevan
14:00 (UTC+4)	Mensah (yellow card) 1'; Khachatryan (yellow card) 22'	Report	Udo (yellow card) 3'; Agdon 24'; Bopesu (yellow card) 88'; Vareika 90+6'	Stadium: Junior Sport Stadium; Referee: Ashot Harutyunyan

1 March 2025 21	Pyunik	1–2	Ararat-Armenia	Yerevan
19:00 (UTC+4)	Otubanjo 57' (pen.); Udo (yellow card) 80'; Alceus (yellow card) 90+2' (yellow-red card) 90+10'	Report	Ocansey 15'; Duarte (yellow card) 45+2'; Queirós (yellow card) 53'; Yenne 66'; Ambartsumyan (yellow card) 75'; Shaghoyan (yellow card) 90+9'	Stadium: Junior Sport Stadium; Referee: Henrik Nalbandian

9 March 2025 22	Pyunik	0–3	Urartu	Yerevan
16:00 (UTC+4)		Report	Santos (yellow card) 37'; Michel 41', 48', 58' (pen.); Tikhy (yellow card) 81'; Ayvazyan (yellow card) 85'; Melikhov (yellow card) 90+6'; S.Mkrtchyan (yellow card) 90+10'	Stadium: Junior Sport Stadium; Referee: Zaven Hovhannisyan

14 March 2025 23	Pyunik	6–1	Shirak	Yerevan
19:00 (UTC+4)	Buhari 12'; Vareika 21'; Déblé 41'; Dzhikiya 47'; Otubanjo (yellow card) 55'; Kovalenko 75'; Bopesu 90+4'	Report	Kodia (yellow card) 43'; Darbinyan (yellow card) 65' (goal) 80'; Vidić (yellow card) 90+3'	Stadium: Junior Sport Stadium; Referee: Henrik Nalbandian

28 March 2025 24	Ararat-Armenia	3–2	Pyunik	Yerevan
19:00 (UTC+4)	Bueno (yellow card) 36'; Shaghoyan 43'; Ocansey 70'; Noubissi 90+3' (pen.) (yellow card) 90+4'	Report	Malakyan 20' (pen.); Vareika 27'; Voskanyan (yellow card) 33'; Haroyan (yellow card) 41'; Alceus (yellow card) 90'; Davidyan (yellow card) 90+4'; Kovalenko (yellow card) 90+9'	Stadium: Yerevan Football Academy Stadium; Referee: Vardan Manukyan

5 April 2025 25	Pyunik	1–1	Alashkert	Abovyan
16:00 (UTC+4)	Vareika 23'; Bopesu (yellow card) 53'; Kovalenko (yellow card) 89'	Report	Metoyan 28'; Manucharyan (yellow card) 55'; Kireyenko (yellow card) 64'; Kikonda (yellow card) 85'	Stadium: City Stadium; Referee: Yura Mahtesyan

12 April 2025 26	Gandzasar Kapan	1–3	Pyunik	Yerevan
16:00 (UTC+4)	Vakulenko 27' (o.g.); Soghomonyan (yellow card) 41'; Emmanuel (yellow card) 73'	Report	Otubanjo 66'; Bopesu 68'; Gonçalves (yellow card) 81'; Vareika 90+7'	Stadium: Junior Sports Stadium; Referee: Artem Gasparyan

19 April 2025 27	Pyunik	1–4	Urartu	Abovyan
16:00 (UTC+4)	Vareika 5' (yellow card) 75'; Udo (yellow card) 27'; Otubanjo (yellow card) 41'; Vakulenko (yellow card) 45+7'; Agdon (yellow card) 52'	Report	Margaryan (yellow card) 53'; Polyarus 63'; Kovalenko 69' (o.g.); Polyakov (yellow card) 71'; Michel 74'; Aghasaryan 90+4'	Stadium: City Stadium; Referee: Ashot Harutyunyan

23 April 2025 28	West Armenia	0–1	Pyunik	Yerevan
16:00 (UTC+4)	Racines (yellow card) 18'; Danielyan (yellow card) 21'; Grigoryan (yellow card) 90+10' (red card) 90+10'	Report	Déblé 11'; Kulikov (yellow card) 65'; Kovalenko (yellow card) 75'; Agdon (yellow card) 84'; Vakulenko (yellow card) 88'; Davidyan (yellow card) 90+1'; Buhari (yellow card) 90+5'	Stadium: Junior Sport Stadium; Referee: Ashot Ghaltakhchyan

4 May 2025 29	Pyunik	1–2	BKMA Yerevan	Abovyan
19:00 (UTC+4)	Kulikov (yellow card) 35'; Malakyan (yellow card) 45+1'; Dzhikiya (yellow card) 90'; Vareika 90+4'	Report	Ha.Sargsyan (yellow card) 40'; Eloyan 50', 83'; Arakelyan (yellow card) 83'	Stadium: City Stadium; Referee: Yura Mahtesyan

9 May 2025 30	Noah	2–1	Pyunik	Abovyan
18:30 (UTC+4)	Hambardzumyan 18'; Zolotić 22'; Khudaverdyan (yellow card) 59'; Ferreira (yellow card) 68'; Eteki (yellow card) 81'	Report	Kovalenko (yellow card) 18'; Kulikov 45+3'; Déblé (yellow card) 81'; Alemão (yellow card) 90'	Stadium: City Stadium; Referee: Hovhannes Kalantaryan

17 May 2025 31	Pyunik	5–2	Ararat Yerevan	Abovyan
18:30 (UTC+4)	Déblé 25', 38'; Otubanjo 53'; Doumbia 58' (o.g.); Malakyan 63' (pen.); Davidyan (yellow card) 73'	Report	Bah (yellow card) 10'; M.Kante (yellow card) 30' (goal) 41'; Doumbia 55'; Dombila (yellow card) 57'; Faye (yellow card) 62'	Stadium: City Stadium; Referee: Vardan Manukyan

23 May 2025 32	Van	3–2	Pyunik	Charentsavan
16:00 (UTC+4)	Touré 33'; Akorede 35' (yellow card) 56'; Macedo 51'	Report	Voskanyan 45'; Haroyan (yellow card) 48'; Kovalenko (yellow card) 75' (goal) 90+8'	Stadium: City Stadium; Referee: Henrik Nalbandian

33	Bye
(UTC+4)

==== League table ====
Pos	Team	Pld	W	D	L	GF	GA	GD	Pts	Qualification or relegation
1	Noah (C)	30	24	3	3	92	20	+72	75	Qualification for the Champions League first qualifying round
2	Ararat-Armenia	30	21	3	6	75	28	+47	66	Qualification for the Conference League second qualifying round (Note: The 2024–25 Armenian Cup winners qualified for the Conference League second qualifying round. Since the cup winners (Noah) qualified based on league position, the Conference League second round spot was passed to the second-placed team, and the second Conference League first round spot was passed to the fourth-placed team.)
3	Urartu	30	19	5	6	64	31	+33	62	Qualification for the Conference League first qualifying round
4	Pyunik	30	17	2	11	59	37	+22	53	Qualification for the Conference League first qualifying round
5	Van	30	15	7	8	56	36	+20	52	
6	BKMA	30	10	6	14	44	54	−10	36	
7	Shirak	30	10	5	15	30	50	−20	35	
8	Ararat Yerevan	30	9	5	16	36	59	−23	32	
9	Alashkert	30	6	8	16	24	52	−28	26	
10	West Armenia (Note: On 7 May 2025, it was announced that West Armenia were on the verge of expulsion after a no show against Ararat-Armenia. On 17 May 2025, they were officially expelled and all games were awarded 3–0 to their opponents.) (D, R)	30	7	2	21	22	78	−56	23	Relegation to the Armenian First League
11	Gandzasar Kapan	30	2	4	24	16	73	−57	10	Spared from relegation

Source: FFA
Rules for classification: 1) Points; 2) Head-to-head points; 3) Head-to-head goal difference; 4) Head-to-head goals scored; 5) Matches won; 6) Goal difference; 7) Less red cards; 8) Less yellow cards; 9) Fair-play ranking 10) Draw
(C) Champions; (D) Disqualified; (R) Relegated

=== Armenian Cup ===
5 March 2025 Quarter-final 1st leg	Pyunik	7–2	Lernayin Artsakh	Yerevan
16:00 (UTC+4)	Kulikov (yellow card) 18'; Dzhikiya 40', 62'; Vareika 45'; Petrosayan 60', 85'; Gevorgyan 84'; Bratkov (yellow card) 80'; Alekyan 90+6'	Report	Trynko 71'; Milovanovich (yellow card) 50' (goal) 82'	Stadium: Junior Sport Stadium; Referee: Sargis Khachatryan

1 April 2025 Quarter-final 2nd leg	Lernayin Artsakh	2–5 (4–12 agg.)	Pyunik	Yerevan
16:00 (UTC+4)	Obregon 70'; T.Hakobyan 87'	Report	Malakyan 2'; Dzkikiya 17', 21', 36'; G.Hakobyan 29' (o.g.)	Stadium: Junior Sport Stadium; Referee: Ashot Harutyunyan

15 April 2025 Semi-final 1st leg	Pyunik	0–2	Ararat-Armenia	Yerevan
18:30 (UTC+4)	Kovalenko (yellow card) 9'; Buhari (yellow card) 29' (red card) 34'	Report	Bueno (yellow card) 23'; Ocansey 52'; Muradyan (yellow card) 61'; Noubissi 81' (pen.)	Stadium: Vazgen Sargsyan Republican Stadium; Referee: Henrik Nalbandyan

29 April 2025 Semi-final 2nd leg	Ararat-Armenia	0–2 (a.e.t.) (2–2 agg.) (4–2 p)	Pyunik	Yerevan
18:30 (UTC+4)	Noubissi (yellow card) 120'	Report	Bratkov 41' (yellow card) 104'; Queirós 52' (o.g.); Davidyan (yellow card) 105'; Vakulenko (yellow card) 120'	Stadium: Yerevan Football Academy Stadium; Referee: Artem Gasparyan
	Penalties
	Noubissi (penalty scored); Harutyunyan (penalty scored); Shaghoyan (penalty scored); Bueno (penalty scored)		(penalty scored) Malakyan; (penalty missed) Voskanyan; (penalty scored) Udo; (penalty missed) Vakulenko

=== UEFA Champions League ===
==== Qualifying rounds ====
10 July 2024 First qualifying round 1st leg	Dinamo Minsk (Belarus)	0–0	(Armenia) Pyunik	Mezőkövesd, Hungary
22:45 (UTC+4)	Pigas (yellow card) 60'; Politevich (yellow card) 74'; Demchenko (yellow card) 79'	Report	Vakulenko (yellow card) 52'; Caraballo (yellow card) 64'	Stadium: Mezőkövesdi Városi Stadion; Attendance: 0 Referee: Volen Chinkov (Bulgaria)
Note: Due to the country's involvement in the Russian invasion of Ukraine, Belarusian teams were required to play their home matches at neutral venues and behind closed doors until further notice.

16 July 2024 First qualifying round 2nd leg	Pyunik (Armenia)	0–1 (0–1 agg.)	(Belarus) Dinamo Minsk	Yerevan, Armenia
20:00 (UTC+4)	Alemão (yellow card) 57'; Cociuc (yellow card) 88'; Agdon (yellow card) 90+3'	Report	Pigas (yellow card) 12'; Politevich (yellow card) 27'; Demchenko (yellow card) 57'; Igor (yellow card) 85'; Hawrylovich 90' (pen.)	Stadium: Republican Stadium; Attendance: 7,400; Referee: Snir Levy (Israel)

=== UEFA Conference League ===
==== Qualifying rounds ====
24 July 2024 Second qualifying round 1st leg	Struga (North Macedonia)	2–1	(Armenia) Pyunik	Ohrid, North Macedonia
19:00 (UTC+4)	Ibraimi 8' (pen.); Kehinde (yellow card) 20'; Spirovski 73' (yellow card) 74'; Jevtoski (yellow card) 85'	Report	Villela 23' (pen.); Maia (yellow card) 29'; Vakulenko (red card) 60'	Stadium: SRC Biljanini Izvori; Attendance: 1,242; Referee: Luís Teixeira (Andorra)
Note: Struga played their home match at the SRC Biljanini Izvori in Ohrid, instead of their regular stadium, the Gradska Plaža Stadium, in Struga, which did not meet UEFA requirements.

30 July 2024 Second qualifying round 2nd leg	Pyunik (Armenia)	3–1 (4–3 agg.)	(North Macedonia) Struga	Yerevan, Armenia
20:00 (UTC+4)	Maia (yellow card) 2'; Déblé 16' (yellow card) 27'; Villela (yellow card) 31'; Kovalenko 45', 90+6'; James (yellow card) 81'	Report	Ristevski (yellow card) 10'; Ibraimi 45+4' (yellow card) 70'; Kasami (yellow card) 76'	Stadium: Republican Stadium; Attendance: 6,421; Referee: Sigurd Kringstad (Norway)

8 August 2024 Third qualifying round 1st leg	Ordabasy (Kazakhstan)	0–1	(Armenia) Pyunik	Almaty, Kazakhstan
19:00 (UTC+4)		Report	Kovalenko (yellow card) 44'; Otubanjo 56' (yellow card) 67'; Davidyan (yellow card) 68'; Grigoryan (yellow card) 90+6'; Bratkov (yellow card) 90+7'	Stadium: Almaty Central Stadium; Attendance: 7,860; Referee: Marek Radina (Czech Republic)
Note: Ordabasy play their home match at the Almaty Central Stadium, in Almaty, instead of their regular stadium, the Kazhimukan Munaitpasov Stadium, in Shymkent.

15 August 2024 Third qualifying round 2nd leg	Pyunik (Armenia)	1–0 (2–0 agg.)	(Kazakhstan) Ordabasy	Yerevan, Armenia
20:00 (UTC+4)	Alemão (yellow card) 14'; Otubanjo 66'	Report	Plastun (yellow card) 56'; Malyi (yellow card) 70'; Šehović (yellow card) 70'; Byesyedin (yellow card) 86'	Stadium: Vazgen Sargsyan Republican Stadium; Attendance: 6,287; Referee: Miguel Nogueira (Portugal)

22 August 2024 Playoff round 1st leg	Pyunik (Armenia)	1–0	(Slovenia) Celje	Yerevan, Armenia
20:00 (UTC+4)	Otubanjo (yellow card) 45+2'; Buhari 59'; Vakulenko (yellow card) 90+3'	Report	Zec (yellow card) 41'; Pišek (yellow card) 71'	Stadium: Vazgen Sargsyan Republican Stadium; Attendance: 7,768; Referee: Luka Bilbija (Bosnia and Herzegovina)

29 August 2024 Playoff round 2nd leg	Celje (Slovenia)	4–1 (4–2 agg.)	(Armenia) Pyunik	Celje, Slovenia
22:15 (UTC+4)	Nemanič (yellow card) 13' (goal) 22'; Kvesić (yellow card) 23' (red card) 49'; Bobičanec 42' (pen.); Kučys 73', 85' (yellow card) 90+5'; Pišek (yellow card) 90+3'; Rozman (yellow card) 90+3'	Report	James (red card) 10'; Cociuc 63' (pen.); Bratkov (yellow card) 90'; Bravo (yellow card) 90+5'	Stadium: Stadion Z'dežele; Attendance: 2,837; Referee: Christian-Petru Ciochirca (Austria)

== Squad statistics ==
As of match played 23 May 2025

=== Appearances and goals ===
No.	Pos	Nat	Player	Total		Premier League		Armenian Cup		Supercup		Champions League		Conference League	
No.	Pos	Nat	Player	Apps	Goals	Apps	Goals	Apps	Goals	Apps	Goals	Apps	Goals	Apps	Goals
3	DF	(Armenia) ARM	Arman Hovhannisyan	9	0	4+4	0	1	0	0	0	0	0	0	0
4	MF	(Armenia) ARM	Solomon Udo	33	0	21+2	0	2	0	1	0	1	0	0+6	0
5	DF	(Armenia) ARM	Varazdat Haroyan	11	0	10	0	0	0	1	0	0	0	0	0
6	DF	(Brazil) BRA	Juninho	19	1	9+2	1	0	0	0	0	2	0	6	0
7	MF	(Armenia) ARM	Edgar Malakyan	26	4	10+11	3	2+1	1	0+1	0	0	0	0+1	0
8	FW	(Ivory Coast) CIV	Serges Déblé	29	10	7+15	9	0+2	0	1	0	0	0	1+3	1
9	FW	(Lithuania) LTU	Matas Vareika	16	8	7+4	7	4	1	1	0	0	0	0	0
10	MF	(Armenia) ARM	Artur Grigoryan	7	0	2+2	0	2+1	0	0	0	0	0	0	0
11	DF	(Democratic Republic of the Congo) COD	Joël Bopesu	12	2	7+3	2	1+1	0	0	0	0	0	0	0
14	FW	(Nigeria) NGR	Yusuf Otubanjo	35	16	19+6	14	2	0	1	0	2	0	5	2
15	DF	(Russia) RUS	Mikhail Kovalenko	33	4	12+10	2	4	0	1	0	0+1	0	4+1	2
17	MF	(Armenia) ARM	Levon Petrosyan	11	2	2+7	0	0+2	2	0	0	0	0	0	0
20	MF	(Brazil) BRA	Lucas Villela	5	1	0	0	0	0	0	0	1+1	0	3	1
21	FW	(Brazil) BRA	Agdon Menezes	31	6	17+5	6	0+1	0	0	0	1+1	0	5+1	0
22	DF	(Brazil) BRA	Alemão	34	0	21+2	0	2	0	1	0	2	0	6	0
23	MF	(Brazil) BRA	Vagner Gonçalves	17	0	8+4	0	3+1	0	1	0	0	0	0	0
24	MF	(Guinea-Bissau) GBS	Mimito Biai	7	0	2+2	0	0+2	0	1	0	0	0	0	0
25	MF	(Russia) RUS	Daniil Kulikov	15	1	10	1	4	0	0+1	0	0	0	0	0
31	MF	(Armenia) ARM	Hamlet Aleksanyan	1	0	1	0	0	0	0	0	0	0	0	0
32	GK	(Armenia) ARM	Sergey Mikaelyan	2	0	1	0	1	0	0	0	0	0	0	0
33	DF	(Armenia) ARM	Taron Voskanyan	28	1	20+4	1	0+1	0	0+1	0	0	0	2	0
35	MF	(Armenia) ARM	Petros Alekyan	2	1	0+1	0	0+1	1	0	0	0	0	0	0
38	MF	(Armenia) ARM	Tigran Gevorgyan	1	1	0	0	0+1	1	0	0	0	0	0	0
41	MF	(Armenia) ARM	Zhirayr Ashikian	1	0	0+1	0	0	0	0	0	0	0	0	0
45	DF	(Armenia) ARM	Marat Asatryan	1	0	0	0	0+1	0	0	0	0	0	0	0
48	MF	(Armenia) ARM	Ruben Karapetyan	1	0	0	0	0+1	0	0	0	0	0	0	0
49	DF	(Armenia) ARM	Aram Aharonyan	1	0	0	0	0+1	0	0	0	0	0	0	0
50	MF	(Armenia) ARM	Narek Baroyan	1	0	0+1	0	0	0	0	0	0	0	0	0
52	MF	(Armenia) ARM	Samson Hakobyan	1	0	0+1	0	0	0	0	0	0	0	0	0
62	MF	(Armenia) ARM	Davit Davtyan	1	0	0	0	0+1	0	0	0	0	0	0	0
66	MF	(Portugal) POR	Martim Maia	15	0	2+5	0	0	0	0	0	1+1	0	6	0
67	MF	(Armenia) ARM	Vardan Melikyan	1	0	0	0	0+1	0	0	0	0	0	0	0
71	GK	(Armenia) ARM	Stanislav Buchnev	19	0	16	0	2	0	1	0	0	0	0	0
73	FW	(Armenia) ARM	Artyom Aleksanyan	1	0	0	0	0+1	0	0	0	0	0	0	0
77	MF	(Nigeria) NGR	Sani Buhari	30	4	13+14	3	1	0	0+1	0	0	0	1	1
79	DF	(Ukraine) UKR	Serhiy Vakulenko	22	0	14+1	0	2	0	0	0	2	0	3	0
92	MF	(Haiti) HAI	Bryan Alceus	18	0	13+4	0	0+1	0	0	0	0	0	0	0
95	DF	(Ukraine) UKR	Anton Bratkov	28	1	18	0	3	1	1	0	2	0	3+1	0
97	MF	(Armenia) ARM	David Davidyan	28	0	9+7	0	4	0	0	0	2	0	3+3	0
98	GK	(Russia) RUS	Nikita Alekseyev	1	0	0	0	1	0	0	0	0	0	0	0
99	MF	(Russia) RUS	Temur Dzhikiya	12	7	2+7	1	2	6	0+1	0	0	0	0	0
Players away on loan:
53	MF	(Armenia) ARM	Artur Manukyan	1	0	0+1	0	0	0	0	0	0	0	0	0
60	DF	(Armenia) ARM	Ishkhan Darbinyan	1	0	1	0	0	0	0	0	0	0	0	0
Players who left Pyunik during the season:
5	DF	(Brazil) BRA	James Santos	20	2	11+1	2	0	0	0	0	1+1	0	6	0
9	FW	(Portugal) POR	João Paredes	13	0	4+2	0	0	0	0	0	0+2	0	0+5	0
10	MF	(Armenia) ARM	Artak Grigoryan	14	1	8+3	1	0	0	0	0	0	0	0+3	0
16	GK	(Armenia) ARM	Henri Avagyan	20	0	12	0	0	0	0	0	2	0	6	0
18	FW	(Venezuela) VEN	José Caraballo	13	1	6+4	1	0	0	0	0	1+1	0	1	0
29	MF	(Moldova) MDA	Eugeniu Cociuc	10	2	1+1	1	0	0	0	0	2	0	5+1	1
44	DF	(Colombia) COL	Juan Bravo	10	0	0+4	0	0	0	0	0	0+2	0	0+4	0

=== Goal scorers ===
Place	Position	Nation	Number	Name	Premier League	Armenian Cup	Supercup	Champions League	Conference League	Total
1	FW	(Nigeria)	14	Yusuf Otubanjo	14	0	0	0	2	16
2	FW	(Ivory Coast)	8	Serges Déblé	8	0	0	0	1	10
3	FW	(Lithuania)	9	Matas Vareika	7	1	0	0	0	8
4	MF	(Russia)	99	Temur Dzhikiya	1	6	0	0	0	7
5	FW	(Brazil)	21	Agdon Menezes	6	0	0	0	0	6
6	MF	(Armenia)	7	Edgar Malakyan	3	1	0	0	0	4
6	DF	(Russia)	15	Mikhail Kovalenko	2	0	0	0	2	4
8	FW	(Nigeria)	77	Sani Buhari	3	0	0	0	1	3
9	DF	(Brazil)	5	James Santos	2	0	0	0	0	2
9	DF	(Democratic Republic of the Congo)	11	Joël Bopesu	2	0	0	0	0	2
9	MF	(Moldova)	29	Eugeniu Cociuc	1	0	0	0	1	2
9	MF	(Armenia)	17	Levon Petrosyan	0	2	0	0	0	2
9				Own goal	1	1	0	0	0	2
14	DF	(Brazil)	6	Juninho	1	0	0	0	0	1
14	FW	(Venezuela)	18	José Caraballo	1	0	0	0	0	1
14	MF	(Brazil)	20	Lucas Villela	0	0	0	0	1	1
14	MF	(Armenia)	10	Artak Grigoryan	1	0	0	0	0	1
14	MF	(Russia)	25	Daniil Kulikov	1	0	0	0	0	1
14	DF	(Armenia)	33	Taron Voskanyan	1	0	0	0	0	1
14	MF	(Armenia)	38	Tigran Gevorgyan	0	1	0	0	0	1
14	MF	(Armenia)	35	Petros Alekyan	0	1	0	0	0	1
14	DF	(Ukraine)	95	Anton Bratkov	0	1	0	0	0	1
				Awarded	3	0	0	0	0	3
				TOTALS	59	14	0	0	8	81

=== Clean sheets ===
Place	Position	Nation	Number	Name	Premier League	Armenian Cup	Supercup	Champions League	Conference League	Total
1	GK	(Armenia)	16	Henri Avagyan	6	0	0	1	3	10
2	GK	(Armenia)	71	Stanislav Buchnev	3	1	0	0	0	4
				TOTALS	9	1	0	1	3	14

=== Disciplinary record ===
Number	Nation	Position	Name	Premier League		Armenian Cup		Supercup		Champions League		Conference League		Total	
Number	Nation	Position	Name	Booked	Sent off (straight red)	Booked	Sent off (straight red)	Booked	Sent off (straight red)	Booked	Sent off (straight red)	Booked	Sent off (straight red)	Booked	Sent off (straight red)
4	(Armenia)	MF	Solomon Udo	4	0	0	0	1	0	0	0	0	0	5	0
5	(Armenia)	DF	Varazdat Haroyan	2	0	0	0	1	0	0	0	0	0	3	0
6	(Brazil)	DF	Juninho	1	0	0	0	0	0	0	0	0	0	1	0
7	(Armenia)	MF	Edgar Malakyan	2	0	0	0	0	0	0	0	0	0	2	0
8	(Ivory Coast)	FW	Serges Déblé	1	0	0	0	0	0	0	0	1	0	2	0
9	(Lithuania)	FW	Matas Vareika	1	0	0	0	0	0	0	0	0	0	1	0
11	(Democratic Republic of the Congo)	DF	Joël Bopesu	2	0	0	0	0	0	0	0	0	0	2	0
14	(Nigeria)	FW	Yusuf Otubanjo	5	0	0	0	0	0	0	0	2	0	7	0
15	(Russia)	DF	Mikhail Kovalenko	7	0	1	0	1	0	0	0	1	0	10	0
20	(Brazil)	MF	Lucas Villela	0	0	0	0	0	0	0	0	1	0	1	0
21	(Brazil)	FW	Agdon Menezes	5	0	0	0	0	0	1	0	0	0	6	0
22	(Brazil)	DF	Alemão	3	0	0	0	0	0	1	0	1	0	5	0
23	(Brazil)	MF	Vagner Gonçalves	1	0	0	0	0	0	0	0	0	0	1	0
25	(Russia)	MF	Daniil Kulikov	2	0	1	0	0	0	0	0	0	0	3	0
33	(Armenia)	DF	Taron Voskanyan	1	0	0	0	0	0	0	0	0	0	1	0
66	(Portugal)	MF	Martim Maia	0	0	0	0	0	0	0	0	2	0	2	0
77	(Nigeria)	FW	Sani Buhari	3	0	1	1	0	0	0	0	0	0	4	1
79	(Ukraine)	DF	Serhiy Vakulenko	4	0	0	0	0	0	1	0	1	1	6	1
92	(Haiti)	MF	Bryan Alceus	4	1	0	0	0	0	0	0	0	0	4	1
95	(Ukraine)	DF	Anton Bratkov	3	0	2	0	1	0	0	0	2	0	8	0
97	(Armenia)	MF	David Davidyan	4	0	1	0	0	0	0	0	1	0	6	0
99	(Russia)	MF	Temur Dzhikiya	1	0	0	0	1	0	0	0	0	0	2	0
Players away on loan:
Players who left Pyunik during the season:
5	(Brazil)	DF	James Santos	3	1	0	0	0	0	0	0	1	1	4	2
10	(Armenia)	MF	Artak Grigoryan	2	0	0	0	0	0	0	0	1	0	1	0
18	(Venezuela)	FW	José Caraballo	1	0	0	0	0	0	1	0	0	0	1	0
29	(Moldova)	MF	Eugeniu Cociuc	0	0	0	0	0	0	1	0	0	0	1	0
44	(Colombia)	DF	Juan Bravo	0	0	0	0	0	0	0	0	1	0	1	0
			TOTALS	62	2	6	1	5	0	5	0	15	2	93	5
