= List of Armenian football transfers winter 2024–25 =

This is a list of Armenian football transfers in the winter transfer window, by club. Only clubs of the 2024–25 Armenian Premier League are included.

== Armenian Premier League 2024–25 ==
=== Alashkert ===
In: Note: Flags indicate national team as defined under FIFA eligibility rules; some limited exceptions apply. Players may hold more than one non-FIFA nationality.

No.	Pos.	Nation	Player
7	MF	ARM	Robert Potinyan (from (Russia) Kompozit Pavlovsky Posad)
8	MF	FRA	Mario-Jason Kikonda (from (Albania) Besa Kavajë)
10	FW	ARM	Gevorg Tarakhchyan (from (Armenia) Urartu)
17	FW	RUS	Artyom Arkhipov (from (Kazakhstan) Turan)
27	MF	GHA	Annan Mensah (from (Armenia) Lernayin Artsakh)
77	FW	GRE	Christos Kountouriotis (from (Georgia (country)) Telavi)
94	DF	BLR	Yevgeniy Guletskiy (from (Belarus) Vitebsk)
95	FW	RUS	Pavel Kireyenko (from (Kazakhstan) Turan)
—	DF	ARM	Arman Ghazaryan (on loan from (Armenia) Urartu)
—	DF	ARM	Robert Navoyan (from (Armenia) Nikarm)
—	MF	ARM	Michael Ayvazyan (from (Armenia) Ararat Yerevan)

Out: Note: Flags indicate national team as defined under FIFA eligibility rules; some limited exceptions apply. Players may hold more than one non-FIFA nationality.

No.	Pos.	Nation	Player
7	MF	ARM	Vahagn Hayrapetyan (to (Armenia) Gandzasar Kapan)
8	DF	AUT	Clinton Bangura (to (North Macedonia) Brera Strumica)
10	FW	GBS	José Embaló
17	FW	BFA	Zakaria Sanogo (to (Burkina Faso) AS Douanes)
21	DF	ARM	Vaspurak Minasyan (to (Armenia) Gandzasar Kapan)
27	DF	UKR	Vadym Paramonov
77	MF	BRA	Jefferson (to (Brazil) River)
94	DF	GEO	Vazha Patsatsia (to (Georgia (country)) Rustavi)
95	FW	COL	Bladimir Díaz (to (Guatemala) Deportivo San Pedro)
98	MF	BRA	Murilo Rosa (to (Brazil) EC Democrata)
99	MF	ARM	Narek Hovhannisyan

=== Ararat-Armenia ===
In: Note: Flags indicate national team as defined under FIFA eligibility rules; some limited exceptions apply. Players may hold more than one non-FIFA nationality.

No.	Pos.	Nation	Player
7	FW	ARM	Zhirayr Shaghoyan (loan return from (Hungary) Debreceni)
34	DF	BRA	Romércio (from (Brazil) Botafogo-SP)
96	GK	ARM	Henri Avagyan (from (Armenia) Pyunik)

Out: Note: Flags indicate national team as defined under FIFA eligibility rules; some limited exceptions apply. Players may hold more than one non-FIFA nationality.

No.	Pos.	Nation	Player
7	MF	ARG	Alexis Rodríguez (to (Ecuador) Deportivo Cuenca)
9	FW	ARM	Artur Serobyan (on loan to (Moldova) Sheriff Tiraspol)
24	GK	ARM	Arsen Beglaryan (to (Armenia) Van)
27	MF	ARM	Davit Petrosyan (on loan to West Armenia)
28	MF	ARM	Davit Barseghyan (on loan to (Armenia) Gandzasar Kapan)

=== Ararat Yerevan ===
In: Note: Flags indicate national team as defined under FIFA eligibility rules; some limited exceptions apply. Players may hold more than one non-FIFA nationality.

No.	Pos.	Nation	Player
17	FW	GUI	Amadou Diakite (from (Guinea) Wakriya)
19	FW	NGR	James Johna (from (Nigeria) Right2Win SA)
39	FW	CIV	Keasse Paul Henri Bah (from (Ivory Coast) SOA)
63	MF	SUI	Marc Tsoungui (from (Switzerland) Stade Lausanne Ouchy)
64	MF	GUI	Alseny Toure (from (Guinea) Wakriya)
92	DF	FRA	Marvin Evouna

Out: Note: Flags indicate national team as defined under FIFA eligibility rules; some limited exceptions apply. Players may hold more than one non-FIFA nationality.

No.	Pos.	Nation	Player
10	MF	ARM	Artur Grigoryan (to (Armenia) Pyunik)
34	DF	MAD	Sandro Trémoulet
44	MF	ARM	Michael Ayvazyan (to (Armenia) Alashkert)
45	FW	CIV	Hyllarion Goore (to (Belgium) Gent)
81	MF	COM	Kassim Hadji (to (Lithuania) Žalgiris)
91	MF	ARM	Suren Kirakosyan (on loan to (Armenia) BKMA Yerevan)

=== BKMA Yerevan ===
In: Note: Flags indicate national team as defined under FIFA eligibility rules; some limited exceptions apply. Players may hold more than one non-FIFA nationality.

No.	Pos.	Nation	Player
—	GK	ARM	Hayk Ghazaryan (on loan from (Armenia) Urartu)
—	MF	ARM	Artur Manukyan (on loan from (Armenia) Pyunik)
—	MF	ARM	Suren Kirakosyan (on loan from (Armenia) Ararat Yerevan)

Out: Note: Flags indicate national team as defined under FIFA eligibility rules; some limited exceptions apply. Players may hold more than one non-FIFA nationality.

No.	Pos.	Nation	Player

=== Gandzasar Kapan ===
In: Note: Flags indicate national team as defined under FIFA eligibility rules; some limited exceptions apply. Players may hold more than one non-FIFA nationality.

No.	Pos.	Nation	Player
1	GK	RUS	Grigori Matevosyan (from (Autonomous Republic of Crimea) Sevastopol)
6	DF	ARM	Vaspurak Minasyan (from (Armenia) Alashkert)
12	MF	NGR	Michael Ndidi (from (Armenia) Lernayin Artsakh)
15	DF	USA	Amin Mizyed (from (Palestine) Markaz Balata)
17	DF	USA	Luke Merrill (from (United States) Spokane Velocity)
20	DF	GHA	Simon Obonde (from (Armenia) Vayk)
33	MF	ARM	Vahagn Hayrapetyan (from (Armenia) Alashkert)
37	DF	ARM	Ruben Karagulyan (from (Armenia) Syunik)
88	MF	ARM	Davit Barseghyan (on loan from Ararat-Armenia)
—	FW	GHA	Edwin Gyasi
—	FW	UKR	Roman Rostokin (from (Armenia) Mika)

Out: Note: Flags indicate national team as defined under FIFA eligibility rules; some limited exceptions apply. Players may hold more than one non-FIFA nationality.

No.	Pos.	Nation	Player
12	GK	RUS	Sergey Dotsenko
15	DF	CIV	Salia Kader Traore
20	DF	RUS	Bunyamudin Mustafayev
23	DF	RUS	Nikita Stepanov
25	FW	NGR	Charles Chibuike (to (Nigeria) Rivers United)

=== Noah ===
In: Note: Flags indicate national team as defined under FIFA eligibility rules; some limited exceptions apply. Players may hold more than one non-FIFA nationality.

No.	Pos.	Nation	Player
5	DF	BRA	James Santos (from (Armenia) Pyunik)
21	MF	POR	Bruno Almeida (on loan from (Portugal) Santa Clara)
44	DF	BIH	Nermin Zolotić (from (Portugal) Casa Pia)

Out: Note: Flags indicate national team as defined under FIFA eligibility rules; some limited exceptions apply. Players may hold more than one non-FIFA nationality.

No.	Pos.	Nation	Player
28	DF	BRA	Pablo Santos

=== Pyunik ===
In: Note: Flags indicate national team as defined under FIFA eligibility rules; some limited exceptions apply. Players may hold more than one non-FIFA nationality.

No.	Pos.	Nation	Player
5	DF	ARM	Varazdat Haroyan (from (China) Qingdao West Coast)
9	FW	LTU	Matas Vareika (from (Lithuania) Hegelmann)
10	MF	ARM	Artur Grigoryan (from (Armenia) Ararat Yerevan)
11	DF	COD	Joël Bopesu (from (Lithuania) Žalgiris)
25	MF	RUS	Daniil Kulikov (from (Belarus) Dinamo Minsk)
99	MF	RUS	Temur Dzhikiya (from (Russia) Volga Ulyanovsk)
—	GK	RUS	Nikita Alekseyev (on loan from (Russia) Ural Yekaterinburg)

Out: Note: Flags indicate national team as defined under FIFA eligibility rules; some limited exceptions apply. Players may hold more than one non-FIFA nationality.

No.	Pos.	Nation	Player
2	FW	BIH	Luka Juričić (loan return to (Romania) CFR Cluj)
5	DF	BRA	James Santos (to (Armenia) Noah)
9	FW	POR	João Paredes (to (Bahrain) Manama Club)
10	MF	ARM	Artak Grigoryan (Retired)
16	GK	ARM	Henri Avagyan (to Ararat-Armenia)
18	FW	VEN	José Caraballo (to (Venezuela) Deportivo La Guaira)
29	MF	MDA	Eugeniu Cociuc
44	DF	COL	Juan Bravo (to West Armenia)
53	MF	ARM	Artur Manukyan (on loan to (Armenia) BKMA Yerevan)
60	DF	ARM	Ishkhan Darbinyan (on loan to West Armenia)

=== Shirak ===
In: Note: Flags indicate national team as defined under FIFA eligibility rules; some limited exceptions apply. Players may hold more than one non-FIFA nationality.

No.	Pos.	Nation	Player

Out: Note: Flags indicate national team as defined under FIFA eligibility rules; some limited exceptions apply. Players may hold more than one non-FIFA nationality.

No.	Pos.	Nation	Player

=== Urartu ===
In: Note: Flags indicate national team as defined under FIFA eligibility rules; some limited exceptions apply. Players may hold more than one non-FIFA nationality.

No.	Pos.	Nation	Player
2	MF	RUS	Artemy Gunko (from (Russia) Kosmos Dolgoprudny)
6	MF	BRA	Alef Santos (from (Georgia (country)) Dinamo Batumi)
9	MF	RUS	Maksim Paliyenko (from (Russia) Akron Tolyatti)
23	FW	ARM	Nicholas Kalukyan (from (United States) Syracuse Orange)
30	MF	BRA	Bruno Michel (from (Brazil) Figueirense)
—	DF	RUS	Dmitry Tikhy (from (Russia) Pari NN)
—	FW	RUS	Vladislav Yakovlev (on loan from (Russia) CSKA Moscow)

Out: Note: Flags indicate national team as defined under FIFA eligibility rules; some limited exceptions apply. Players may hold more than one non-FIFA nationality.

No.	Pos.	Nation	Player
4	DF	ARM	Arman Ghazaryan (on loan to (Armenia) Alashkert)
6	MF	NGR	Luqman Gilmore
9	FW	RUS	Leon Sabua (to (Russia) Amkal Moscow)
11	FW	ARM	Gevorg Tarakhchyan (to (Armenia) Alashkert)
12	GK	ARM	Mkhitar Umreyan (to West Armenia)
21	MF	UKR	Andriy Kravchuk
34	MF	MAR	Ayoub Abou (to (Montenegro) Sutjeska Nikšić)
85	FW	RUS	Ivan Ignatyev (to (Algeria) JS Kabylie)
91	GK	ARM	Hayk Ghazaryan (on loan to (Armenia) BKMA Yerevan)

=== Van ===
In: Note: Flags indicate national team as defined under FIFA eligibility rules; some limited exceptions apply. Players may hold more than one non-FIFA nationality.

No.	Pos.	Nation	Player
24	GK	ARM	Arsen Beglaryan (from Ararat-Armenia)
27	DF	CIV	Julien Eymard Bationo (from (Russia) Vista Gelendzhik)
28	FW	NGR	Usman Ajibona Akorede (from (Russia) Vista Gelendzhik)
31	GK	ARM	Anatoly Ayvazov (from West Armenia)
33	DF	ARM	Armen Sargsyan (from West Armenia)
45	FW	NGR	Malik Odeyinka (on loan from (Bulgaria) Botev Plovdiv)

Out: Note: Flags indicate national team as defined under FIFA eligibility rules; some limited exceptions apply. Players may hold more than one non-FIFA nationality.

No.	Pos.	Nation	Player
10	MF	GHA	John Batigi (loan return to (Bulgaria) Botev Plovdiv)
27	DF	SLE	Citta Ba (to (Sierra Leone) Star Sport)
31	GK	RUS	Daniil Polyanski (to (Belarus) Arsenal Dzerzhinsk)
99	FW	GUI	Mamadou Diallo (to (Armenia) Syunik)

=== West Armenia ===
In: Note: Flags indicate national team as defined under FIFA eligibility rules; some limited exceptions apply. Players may hold more than one non-FIFA nationality.

No.	Pos.	Nation	Player
11	FW	HAI	Jonel Désiré (from (Georgia (country)) Telavi)
20	DF	FRA	Marco Sevilla (from (France) UGA Ardziv)
27	MF	ARM	Davit Petrosyan (on loan from Ararat-Armenia)
33	FW	ECU	Yeison Racines (from (Ecuador) Delfín)
59	DF	JAM	Romain Blake (from (United States) Chicago Fire II)
60	DF	ARM	Ishkhan Darbinyan (on loan from (Armenia) Pyunik)
77	MF	RUS	Magomed Estamirov (from (Russia) Angusht Nazran)
91	GK	ARM	Mkhitar Umreyan (from (Armenia) Urartu)
99	DF	ARM	Davit Sargsyan (from (Armenia) Mika)
—	DF	COL	Juan Bravo (from (Armenia) Pyunik)

Out: Note: Flags indicate national team as defined under FIFA eligibility rules; some limited exceptions apply. Players may hold more than one non-FIFA nationality.

No.	Pos.	Nation	Player
5	DF	ARM	Armen Sargsyan (to (Armenia) Van)
7	FW	MLI	Hadji Dramé (to (North Macedonia) Brera Strumica)
11	FW	RUS	Zakhar Tarasenko (to (North Macedonia) Pelister)
13	GK	ARM	Anatoly Ayvazov (to (Armenia) Van)
16	MF	POR	Braima Candé (to (Malta) Tarxien Rainbows)
25	DF	KAZ	Timur Rudoselsky (to (Kazakhstan) Zhetysu)
99	MF	MLI	Issa Jibril Traore (to (Malta) Senglea Athletic)
