= 2024–25 Armenian Cup =

Tournament details
- Country: Armenia
- Teams: 20

Final positions
- Champions: Noah
- Runners-up: Ararat-Armenia

Tournament statistics
- Matches played: 25
- Goals scored: 93 (3.72 per match)
- All statistics correct as of 13 May 2025.

The 2024–25 Armenian Cup was the 34th edition of the football competition in Armenia. The winners qualified for the 2025–26 UEFA Conference League second qualifying round.

Noah won the cup (their second Armenian Cup win), defeating defending holders Ararat-Armenia 3–1 in the final. Since they qualified for the Champions League based on league position, the spot for winning the cup was passed to the second-placed team of the 2024–25 Armenian Premier League.

== Teams ==
| Round | Clubs remaining | Clubs involved | Winners from previous round | New entries this round | Leagues entering at this round |
|---|---|---|---|---|---|
| First round | 20 | 12 | None | 12 | 3 Amateur A-League teams 6 Armenian First League teams 3 Armenian Premier League teams |
| Second round | 14 | 12 | 6 | 6 | 6 Armenian Premier League teams |
| Quarter-finals | 8 | 8 | 6 | 2 | 2 Armenian Premier League teams (Pyunik as champion of 2023-24 Armenian Premier League and Ararat-Armenia as winner of 2023-24 Armenian Cup) |
| Semi-finals | 4 | 4 | 4 | none | none |
| Final | 2 | 2 | 2 | none | none |

== First round ==
On 11 July 2024, the Football Federation of Armenia announced the draw for the first round.

| 20 August 2024 | Araks Ararat (3) | 0–2 | Gandzasar Kapan (1) | Armavir |
| 16:30 (UTC+4) | Mnatsakanyan (yellow card) 20'; Akato (yellow card) 30'; Zakaryan (yellow card) 45+2'; Khandamiryan (yellow card) 55' | Report | Sawada (yellow card) 39'; Zakaryan (red card) 45+5'; Mercado 45+12' (o.g.); Kocharyan 80' (yellow card) 90+4' | Stadium: Armavir City Stadium; Referee: Hovhannes Kalantaryan |

| 20 August 2024 | Bentonit (2) | 0–7 | Lernayin Artsakh (2) | Vanadzor |
| 16:30 (UTC+4) | Gevorgyan (yellow card) 48' | Report | T.Hakobyan 13', 43'; Ordinyan 15'; Onuoha 25', 68' (yellow card) 61'; Jindoyan 33', 58' (pen.) | Stadium: Vanadzor City Stadium; Referee: Tiran Eritsyan |

| 21 August 2024 | Andranik (2) | 0–3 | Van (1) | Charentsavan |
| 16:30 (UTC+4) | Oublal (red card) 54'; Gamboa (yellow card) 87'; Melkonyan (yellow card) 90+3' | Report | John 21'; Farayola 39'; Ba (yellow card) 45+2'; Touré (yellow card) 90+1'; Diallo 90+3' | Stadium: Charentsavan City Stadium; Referee: Samvel Hovsepyan |

| 21 August 2024 | BKMA Yerevan (1) | 6–1 | Kilikia (3) | Yerevan |
| 19:00 (UTC+4) | Hovhannisyan 18'; Petrosyan 23'; D.Hakobyan 49'; Vardanyan 51'; Janoyan 55'; Askaryan 80' | Report | Ekong (yellow card) 10'; Karapetyan 89' | Stadium: Yerevan Football Academy; Referee: Sargis Khachatryan |

| 22 August 2024 | Mika (2) | 2–1 | Vayk (3) | Yerevan |
| 16:30 (UTC+4) | Ghandilyan 45+2'; Rostokin 54'; John (yellow card) 90+7' | Report | Koki (yellow card) 38'; Vardanyan (yellow card) 60'; Avagyan 90+3' | Stadium: RCCSD Stadium; Referee: Artak Vardanyan |

| 22 August 2024 | Nikarm (2) | 0–11 | Syunik (2) | Vanadzor |
| 16:30 (UTC+4) | Geremi (yellow card) 70' | Report | Avetisyan 11', 45+1'; Hakobyan 13', 20'; Minasyan 32', 46'; Hovhannisyan 36'; Afajanyan (yellow card) 40'; Arutyunyan 62', 82', 89'; Arakelyan 71' | Stadium: Vanadzor City Stadium; Referee: Davit Mkrtchyan |

== Second round ==
On 17 September 2024, the Football Federation of Armenia announced the draw for the second round.

| 1 October 2024 | Mika (2) | 0–2 (a.e.t.) | Lernayin Artsakh (2) | Yerevan |
| 15:00 (UTC+4) | Johnson (yellow card) 99'; Onuoha (yellow card) 101'; D.Sargsyanson (yellow card) 104'; Babakhanlu (yellow card) 118' | Report | Mensah (yellow card) 15'; Jindoyan (penalty missed) 24 105+2'; Pirijanyan (yellow card) 44'; Grigoryan (yellow card) 85'; Likpa (yellow card) 104'; Onuoha 119' | Stadium: RCCSD Stadium; Referee: Samvel Hovsepyan |

| 1 October 2024 | Shirak (1) | 0–3 | Van (1) | Gyumri |
| 19:00 (UTC+4) | Doh (yellow card) 47'; Misakyan (yellow card) 48'; Mnatsakanyan (yellow card) (yellow-red card) 77' | Report | Touré 16', 45'; Batigi (yellow card) 48'; Okonkwo 63'; Drammeh (yellow card) 67' | Stadium: City Stadium; Referee: Vardan Manukyan |

| 2 October 2024 | West Armenia (1) | 2–1 | Syunik (2) | Yerevan |
| 17:00 (UTC+4) | Rudoselsky 12'; Grigoryan (yellow card) 21'; Yusuf (yellow card) 24'; Danielyan 36' (yellow card) 53'; Sargsyan (yellow card) 81' | Report | Vardanyan (yellow card) 21'; Arutyunyan 45' (yellow card) 59'; Arakelyan (yellow card) (yellow-red card) 62'; Avetisyan (yellow card) 90+6' | Stadium: Junior Sport Stadium; Referee: Tiran Eritsyan |

| 2 October 2024 | Ararat Yerevan (1) | 1–1 (4–5 p) | Gandzasar Kapan (1) | Abovyan |
| 19:00 (UTC+4) | Samsonyan (yellow card) 60'; Dombila (yellow card) 71'; Hadji 81'; Galstyan (yellow card) (yellow-red card) 92'; Gomes (yellow card) 117' | Report | Mustafayev (yellow card) 17'; Kocharyan 36' (pen.); S.Chibuike (yellow card) 41'; V.Muradyan (yellow card) 61'; Vopanyan (yellow card) 66'; Stepanov (yellow card) 80'; O.Chibuike (yellow card) 94'; Traore (yellow card) 119' | Stadium: Abovyan City Stadium; Referee: Artak Vardanyan |
| | Penalties |
| | Lulukyan (penalty scored); Goore (penalty scored); Faye (penalty scored); Hadji (penalty missed); Grigoryan (penalty scored) | | (penalty scored) Yedigaryan; (penalty scored) O.Chibuike; (penalty scored) Traore; (penalty scored) Faye; (penalty scored) Pepi |

| 3 October 2024 | BKMA Yerevan (1) | 0–4 | Urartu (1) | Abovyan |
| 18:00 (UTC+4) | Petrosyan (yellow card) 81' | Report | Movsesyan 7', 51'; Kilin 28'; Ignatyev (yellow card) 31'; Sabua 67'; Ghazaryan (yellow card) 90+4' | Stadium: Abovyan City Stadium; Referee: Ashot Harutyunyan |

| 19 February 2025 | Noah (1) | 2–0 | Alashkert (1) | Yerevan |
| 16:00 (UTC+4) | Çinari (yellow card) 32'; Gregório 40'; Manvelyan 50'; Silva (yellow card) 74' | Report | Manucharyan (yellow card) 36'; Hovsepyan (yellow card) 64'; Avetisyan (yellow card) 81'; A.Hovhannisyan (yellow card) 86' | Stadium: Junior Sport Stadium; Referee: Vardan Manukyan |

== Quarter-finals ==
On 17 January 2025, the Football Federation of Armenia announced the draw for the Quarter-finals.

| 5 March 2025 1st leg | Urartu (1) | 0–1 | Ararat-Armenia (1) | Charentsavan |
| 16:00 (UTC+4) | Piloyan (yellow card) 28' | Report | Grigoryan (yellow card) 14'; Ambartsumyan (yellow card) 30'; Yenne 48' (pen.); Queirós (yellow card) 66'; Shaghoyan (yellow card) 70' | Stadium: Charentsavan City Stadium; Referee: Hovhannes Kalantaryan |

| 1 April 2025 2nd leg | Ararat-Armenia (1) | 2–1 (3–1 agg.) | Urartu (1) | Yerevan |
| 19:00 (UTC+4) | Grigoryan (yellow card) 4'; Putsko 62' (o.g.); Duarte (yellow card) 90+2'; Tera 90+7' | Report | Polyarus (yellow card) 14'; Tikhy 42'; Santos (yellow card) 58'; Aghasaryan (yellow card) 90+6' | Stadium: Yerevan Football Academy Stadium; Referee: Yura Mahtesyan |

| 6 March 2025 1st leg | Van (1) | 3–0 | West Armenia (1) | Charentsavan |
| 15:00 (UTC+4) | Nalbandyan 45' (pen.), 60'; Touré (penalty missed) 57' 58' | Report | Makhsudyan (yellow card) 24'; Désiré (yellow card) 46' | Stadium: Charentsavan City Stadium; Referee: Davit Mkrtchyan |

| 2 April 2025 2nd leg | West Armenia (1) | 2–3 (2–6 agg.) | Van (1) | Yerevan |
| 16:00 (UTC+4) | Matyukhin 38' (o.g.); Grigoryan 90+3' (pen.) | Report | Okonkwo 17'; Akorede (yellow card) 31'; Gareginyan (yellow card) 34'; Vardanyan 45'; Odeyinka 65' | Stadium: Junior Sport Stadium; Referee: Artem Gasparyan |

| 5 March 2025 1st leg | Pyunik (1) | 7–2 | Lernayin Artsakh (2) | Yerevan |
| 16:00 (UTC+4) | Kulikov (yellow card) 18'; Dzhikiya 40', 62'; Vareika 45'; Petrosayan 60', 85'; Gevorgyan 84'; Bratkov (yellow card) 80' Alekyan 90+6' | Report | Trynko 71'; Milovanovich (yellow card) 50' (goal) 82' | Stadium: Junior Sport Stadium; Referee: Sargis Khachatryan |

| 1 April 2025 2nd leg | Lernayin Artsakh (2) | 2–5 (4–12 agg.) | Pyunik (1) | Yerevan |
| 16:00 (UTC+4) | Obregon 70'; T.Hakobyan 87' | Report | Malakyan 2'; Dzkikiya 17', 21', 29', 36' | Stadium: Junior Sport Stadium; Referee: Ashot Harutyunyan |

| 6 March 2025 1st leg | Gandzasar Kapan (1) | 0–3 | Noah (1) | Yerevan |
| 18:00 (UTC+4) | Hayrapetyan (red card) 45+1'; Obonde (yellow card) 47'; Ndidi (yellow card) 79'; Kanda (yellow card) 86'; Matevosyan (yellow card) 90+4' | Report | Muradyan (yellow card) 30'; Aiás 45+2' (pen.); Hambardzumyan 51' (yellow card) 65'; Almeida 87'; Movsesyan (yellow card) 88' | Stadium: Junior Sport Stadium; Referee: Vardan Vardumyan |

| 2 April 2025 2nd leg | Noah (1) | 4–0 (7–0 agg.) | Gandzasar Kapan (1) | Abovyan |
| 18:00 (UTC+4) | Khudaverdyan 12'; Aiás 28'; Pedro (yellow card) 64'; Çinari 82'; Almeida 84' | Report | Tatintsyan (yellow card) 22'; Emmanuel (yellow card) 62' | Stadium: City Stadium; Referee: Hovhannes Kalantaryan |

== Semi-finals ==
| 15 April 2025 1st leg | Pyunik (1) | 0–2 | Ararat-Armenia (1) | Yerevan |
| 18:30 (UTC+4) | Kovalenko (yellow card) 9'; Buhari (yellow card) 29' (red card) 34' | Report | Bueno (yellow card) 23'; Ocansey 52'; Muradyan (yellow card) 61'; Noubissi 81' (pen.) | Stadium: Vazgen Sargsyan Republican Stadium; Referee: Henrik Nalbandyan |

| 29 April 2025 2nd leg | Ararat-Armenia (1) | 0–2 (a.e.t.) (2–2 agg.) (4–2 p) | Pyunik (1) | Yerevan |
| 18:30 (UTC+4) | Noubissi (yellow card) 120' | Report | Bratkov 41' (yellow card) 104'; Queirós 52' (o.g.); Davidyan (yellow card) 105'; Vakulenko (yellow card) 120' | Stadium: Yerevan Football Academy Stadium; Referee: Artem Gasparyan |
| | Penalties |
| | Noubissi (penalty scored); Harutyunyan (penalty scored); Shaghoyan (penalty scored); Bueno (penalty scored) | | (penalty scored) Malakyan; (penalty missed) Voskanyan; (penalty scored) Udo; (penalty missed) Vakulenko |

| 16 April 2025 1st leg | Noah (1) | 2–0 | Van (1) | Abovyan |
| 18:30 (UTC+4) | Aiás 36'; Hambardzumyan (yellow card) 45+10'; Almeida (yellow card) 53'; Manvelyan (yellow card) 65'; Omar 89' | Report | Sargsyan (yellow card) 45+8'; Beglaryan (red card) 45+16'; Grigoryan (yellow card) 50' | Stadium: City Stadium; Referee: Yura Mahtesyan |

| 30 April 2025 2nd leg | Van (1) | 1–0 (1–2 agg.) | Noah (1) | Charentsavan |
| 15:00 (UTC+4) | Odeyinka (yellow card) 25'; Akorede (yellow card) 33'; Bationo (yellow card) 57' (yellow-red card) 90'; Vardanyan 86' | Report | Eteki (yellow card) 26'; Čančarević (yellow card) 33'; Manvelyan (yellow card) 57'; Khudaverdyan (yellow card) 90+6' | Stadium: Charentsavan City Stadium; Referee: Ashot Harutyunyan |

== Final ==
| 13 May 2025 | Noah (1) | 3–1 | Ararat-Armenia (1) | Yerevan |
| 19:00 (UTC+4) | Ferreira 40', 57'; Aiás 87' | Report | Noubissi 44' | Stadium: Vazgen Sargsyan Republican Stadium; Referee: Ashot Harutyunyan |

== Goal scorers ==
As of match played 13 May 2025

6 goals:

- (Russia) Temur Dzhikiya - Pyunik

4 goals:

- (Brazil) Matheus Aiás - Noah
- (Armenia) Artem Arutyunyan - Syunik

3 goals:

- (Armenia) Akhmed Jindoyan - Lernayin Artsakh
- (Armenia) Tigran Hakobyan - Lernayin Artsakh
- (Nigeria) Oluebube Miracle Onuoha - Lernayin Artsakh
- (Guinea) Momo Touré - Van

2 goals:

- (Cameroon) Marius Noubissi - Ararat-Armenia
- (Armenia) Ashot Kocharyan - Gandzasar Kapan
- (Portugal) Bruno Almeida - Noah
- (Portugal) Hélder Ferreira - Noah
- (Armenia) Levon Petrosayan - Pyunik
- (Armenia) Patvakan Avetisyan - Syunik
- (Armenia) Samvel Hakobyan - Syunik
- (Armenia) Hamlet Minasyan - Syunik
- (Armenia) Edgar Movsesyan - Urartu
- (Armenia) Karen Nalbandyan - Van
- (Armenia) Levon Vardanyan - Van
- (Nigeria) Izuchukwu Okonkwo - Van

1 goals:

- (Ghana) Eric Ocansey - Ararat-Armenia
- (Kenya) Alwyn Tera - Ararat-Armenia
- (Nigeria) Tenton Yenne - Ararat-Armenia
- (Comoros) Kassim Hadji - Ararat Yerevan
- (Armenia) Artur Askaryan - BKMA Yerevan
- (Armenia) Davit Hakobyan - BKMA Yerevan
- (Armenia) Karlen Hovhannisyan - BKMA Yerevan
- (Armenia) Narek Janoyan - BKMA Yerevan
- (Armenia) Argishti Petrosyan - BKMA Yerevan
- (Armenia) Edik Vardanyan - BKMA Yerevan
- (Armenia) Aleksandr Karapetyan - Kilikia
- (Armenia) Artur Ordinyan - Lernayin Artsakh
- (Ecuador) Juan Obregon - Lernayin Artsakh
- (Russia) Ilya Trynko - Lernayin Artsakh
- (Serbia) M.Milovanovich - Lernayin Artsakh
- (Armenia) Davit Ghandilyan - Mika
- (Ukraine) Roman Rostokin - Mika
- (Albania) Eraldo Çinari - Noah
- (Armenia) Hovhannes Hambardzumyan - Noah
- (Armenia) Zaven Khudaverdyan - Noah
- (Armenia) Gor Manvelyan - Noah
- (Netherlands) Imran Oulad Omar - Noah
- (Portugal) Gonçalo Gregório - Noah
- (Armenia) Petros Alekyan - Pyunik
- (Armenia) Tigran Gevorgyan - Pyunik
- (Armenia) Edgar Malakyan - Pyunik
- (Lithuania) Matas Vareika - Pyunik
- (Ukraine) Anton Bratkov - Pyunik
- (Armenia) Yura Arakelyan - Syunik
- (Armenia) Hayk Hovhannisyan - Syunik
- (Russia) Anton Kilin - Urartu
- (Russia) Leon Sabua - Urartu
- (Russia) Dmitry Tikhy - Urartu
- (Guinea) Mamadou Diallo - Van
- (Nigeria) Emmanuel John - Van
- (Nigeria) Olawale Farayola - Van
- (Nigeria) Malik Odeyinka - Van
- (Armenia) Narek Avagyan - Vayk
- Artur Danielyan - West Armenia
- Martin Grigoryan - West Armenia
- (Kazakhstan) Timur Rudoselsky - West Armenia

Own goals:

- (Bolivia) Paulo Mercado - Araks Ararat vs Gandzasar Kapan 20 August 2024
- (Russia) Aleksandr Putsko - Ararat-Armenia vs Urartu 1 April 2025
- (Russia) Yaroslav Matyukhin - Ararat-Armenia vs Van 2 April 2025
- (Portugal) João Queirós - Ararat-Armenia vs Pyunik 29 April 2025

== See also ==
- Football in Armenia
- 2024–25 Armenian Premier League
- 2024–25 Armenian First League
