= 2024 Armenian Supercup =

Pyunik	Ararat-Armenia
0	4
- Date: 9 April 2025
- Venue: Republican Stadium, Yerevan
- Referee: Hovhannes Kalantaryan

The 2024 Armenian Supercup is the 26th Armenian Supercup, an annual football match played between the previous season's Premier League winners, Pyunik and the previous season's Armenian Cup winners, Ararat-Armenia.

== Background ==
On 16 January 2025, the Football Federation of Armenia announced that the 2024 Armenian Supercup would be played on 20 February 2025 by Pyunik and Ararat-Armenia at the Republican Stadium.

On 20 February 2025, the match was postponed due to bad weather conditions.

On 21 March 2025, the Football Federation of Armenia announced that the new date for the Supercup, would be 9 April 2025, with the match still taking place at the Republican Stadium and kicking off at 19:00 AMT.

== Match ==
=== Summary ===
Marius Noubissi opened the scoring for Ararat-Armenia after three minutes, heading in a Jonathan Duarte lob on the line. Five minutes later Noubissi turned assister, setting up Tenton Yenne to double Ararat-Armenia's lead. With five minutes left of the first half, Pyunik defender Anton Bratkov sliced at a Jonathan Duarte cross to send the ball into the back of the net for a third time.

In the second half, Eric Ocansey intercepted a loose pass by Bratkov to then square to Noubissi who scored his second of the game, Ararat-Armenia's forth, securing Ararat-Armenia's second Supercup title.

=== Details ===
9 April 2025
19:00 (UTC+4)

Pyunik	0 – 4	Ararat-Armenia
	Report	Noubissi 3', 77'; Yenne 8'; Bratkov 40' (o.g.)

Republican Stadium, Yerevan
Referee: Hovhannes Kalantaryan

Pyunik	Ararat-Armenia

GK	71	(Armenia) Stanislav Buchnev
DF	5	(Armenia) Varazdat Haroyan	(yellow card) 15'	(substituted off) 22'
DF	22	(Brazil) Alemão
DF	95	(Ukraine) Anton Bratkov	(yellow card) 72'
MF	4	(Armenia) Solomon Udo	(yellow card) 60'
MF	15	(Russia) Mikhail Kovalenko	(yellow card) 90+4'
MF	23	(Brazil) Vagner Gonçalves		(substituted off) 46'
MF	24	(Guinea-Bissau) Mimito Biai		(substituted off) 83'
FW	8	(Ivory Coast) Serges Déblé		(substituted off) 57'
FW	9	(Lithuania) Matas Vareika
FW	14	(Nigeria) Yusuf Otubanjo		(substituted off) 57'
Substitutes:
GK	32	(Armenia) Sergey Mikaelyan
MF	7	(Armenia) Edgar Malakyan		(substituted in) 57'
MF	10	(Armenia) Artur Grigoryan
DF	11	(Democratic Republic of the Congo) Joël Bopesu
MF	17	(Armenia) Levon Petrosyan
MF	25	(Russia) Daniil Kulikov		(substituted in) 83'
DF	33	(Armenia) Taron Voskanyan		(substituted in) 22'
FW	77	(Nigeria) Sani Buhari		(substituted in) 46'
DF	79	(Ukraine) Serhiy Vakulenko
MF	92	(Haiti) Bryan Alceus
MF	97	(Armenia) David Davidyan
MF	99	(Russia) Temur Dzhikiya	(yellow card) 75'	(substituted in) 57'
Manager:
(Armenia) Yegishe Melikyan

GK	96	(Armenia) Henri Avagyan
DF	3	(Colombia) Junior Bueno
DF	4	(Portugal) João Queirós
DF	13	(Armenia) Kamo Hovhannisyan
DF	16	(Armenia) Edgar Grigoryan
MF	10	(Russia) Armen Ambartsumyan	(substituted off) 64'
MF	11	(Colombia) Jonathan Duarte	(substituted off) 64'
MF	19	(Armenia) Karen Muradyan
FW	15	(Nigeria) Tenton Yenne	(substituted off) 51'
FW	33	(Ghana) Eric Ocansey	(substituted off) 79'
FW	45	(Cameroon) Marius Noubissi	(substituted off) 79'
Substitutes:
GK	1	(Armenia) Rafael Manasyan
GK	31	(Ukraine) Danylo Kucher
DF	5	(Armenia) Hakob Hakobyan	(substituted in) 64'
FW	7	(Armenia) Zhirayr Shaghoyan	(substituted in) 51'
MF	8	(Armenia) Hovhannes Harutyunyan	(substituted in) 64'
MF	12	(Kenya) Amos Nondi
FW	17	(Nigeria) Matthew Gbomadu	(substituted in) 86'
MF	20	(Kenya) Alwyn Tera	(substituted in) 79'
MF	21	(Armenia) Narek Alaverdyan
DF	25	(Belarus) Aleksandr Pavlovets
Manager:
(Armenia) Vardan Minasyan

Assistant referees:
Narek Poghosyan
Arman Hakobjanyan
Fourth official:
Ashot Harutyunyan
Video assistant referee:
Zaven Hovhannisyan
Mesrop Ghazaryan

== See also ==
- 2023–24 Armenian Premier League
- 2023–24 Armenian Cup
