= Veniamin Bayazov =

Russian footballer

Personal information
- Full name: Veniamin Alekseyevich Bayazov
- Date of birth: 24 March 1997 (age 29)
- Place of birth: Lipetsk, Russia
- Height: 1.81 m (5 ft 11 in)
- Position: Midfielder

Senior career*
Years	Team	Apps	(Gls)
2015–2023	Metallurg Lipetsk	100	(1)
2023	Kompozit Pavlovsky Posad	13	(0)
2024	Ryazan	8	(0)
- * Club domestic league appearances and goals as of 3 November 2024

Veniamin Alekseyevich Bayazov (Russian: Вениамин Алексеевич Баязов; born 24 March 1997) is a Russian football player.

== Club career ==
He made his debut in the Russian Football National League for Metallurg Lipetsk on 31 July 2021 in a game against Neftekhimik Nizhnekamsk.
