= FC Ryazan =

Russian football club

- Full name: Football Club Ryazan
- Founded: 1995
- Ground: CSK Stadium, Ryazan
- Capacity: 25,000
- Owner: Ryazan Oblast
- Chairman: Dmitri Malakhov
- Manager: Dmitri Seryozhkin
- League: FNL 2 Group 3
- 2021–22: 10th

FC Ryazan (Russian: ФК «Рязань») is a Russian football club from Ryazan, founded in 1995. It played in the third-tier Russian Second Division since 2000, when they took over the spot previously held there by another Ryazan club, FC Spartak Ryazan, with FC Ryazan renaming themselves to FC Spartak Ryazan for the 2000 season only. From October 2000 to 2001 the club was called Agrokomplekt Ryazan and from 2002 to 2006 – FC Ryazan-Agrokomplekt Ryazan. In March 2010, FC Ryazan dropped out of the Russian Second Division and went bankrupt.

FC Ryazan was replaced professionally with FC Zvezda Ryazan, which was then renamed to FC Ryazan before the 2014–15 season.
