= Dmitri Shikhovtsev =

Russian footballer

Personal information
- Full name: Dmitri Sergeyevich Shikhovtsev
- Date of birth: 7 April 1986 (age 40)
- Place of birth: Moscow, Soviet Union
- Height: 1.85 m (6 ft 1 in)
- Position: Defender

Youth career
- 1999–2002: FC Dynamo Moscow

Senior career*
Years	Team	Apps	(Gls)
2002–2005	FC Dynamo Moscow	0	(0)
2006	LFC Dynamo Moscow (D4)	17	(2)
2007	FC Istra (D4)	6	(2)
2007	FC Tekstilshchik-Telekom Ivanovo	10	(1)
2008	FC Olimp Fryazino (D4)	10	(4)
2008	FC Spartak Shchyolkovo	6	(0)
2009–2010	FK Radnički 1923		
2010	FC Olimp Fryazino (D4)	25	(2)
2011	FC Balashikha (D4)	9	(0)
2012	FC Saturn Moscow Oblast	8	(0)
2013	FC Olimp Fryazino (D4)	26	(0)
- * Club domestic league appearances and goals

Dmitri Sergeyevich Shikhovtsev (Russian: Дмитрий Серге́евич Шиховцев; born 7 April 1986) is a former Russian football defender.

== Club career ==
Born in Moscow, he played in the youth and reserves team of FC Dynamo Moscow between 1999 and 2006.

He made his Russian Football National League debut for FC Tekstilshchik-Telekom Ivanovo on 2 August 2007 in a game against FC Ural Yekaterinburg.

In February 2009 he moved abroad and joined FK Radnički 1923 in the Serbian First League playing with them during the second half of the 2008-09 season and the 2009-10 season in which the club used the name FK Šumadija Radnički during the first part of the season after a merger with another local club.

In early 2012 Dmitri Shikhovtsev joined FC Saturn Moscow Oblast playing in the Russian Second Division.
