= Dmitri Seryozhkin =

Russian footballer and manager

Personal information
- Full name: Dmitri Vyacheslavovich Seryozhkin
- Date of birth: 18 July 1976 (age 50)
- Place of birth: Lopatinsky, Moscow Oblast, Russian SFSR
- Height: 1.78 m (5 ft 10 in)
- Positions: Midfielder; defender

Team information
- Current team: FC Kompozit Pavlovsky Posad (manager)

Senior career*
Years	Team	Apps	(Gls)
1994	FC Gigant Voskresensk	40	(1)
1995–2002	FC Fabus Bronnitsy	301	(18)
2003–2006	FC Dynamo Bryansk	141	(1)
2007	FC Ryazan	27	(1)
2008	FC Lukhovitsy	29	(0)
2009	FC FSA Voronezh	26	(0)
2010	FC Spartak Kostroma	29	(0)
2011–2013	FC Saturn-2 Moscow Oblast	42	(0)

Managerial career
- 2012–2013: FC Saturn Ramenskoye (assistant)
- 2014: FC Saturn-2 Ramenskoye (assistant)
- 2014–2016: FC Saturn-M Ramenskoye
- 2016–2019: FC Saturn Ramenskoye
- 2019: FC Chayka Peschanokopskoye (assistant)
- 2020–2021: FC Znamya Noginsk
- 2021–2023: FC Ryazan
- 2023–: FC Kompozit Pavlovsky Posad
- * Club domestic league appearances and goals

Dmitri Vyacheslavovich Seryozhkin (Russian: Дмитрий Вячеславович Серёжкин; born 18 July 1976) is a Russian professional football manager and a former player. He is the manager of FC Kompozit Pavlovsky Posad.
