= FC Saturn-2 Moscow Region =

FC Saturn Moscow Oblast
- Full name: Football Club Saturn- Moscow Oblast
- Nickname(s): Inoplanetyane (Aliens)
- Founded: 1991; 34 years ago
- Ground: Saturn Stadium, Ramenskoye
- Capacity: 14,685
- Chairman: Evgeny Kalakutsky
- Manager: Oleksandr Horshkov
- League: Russian Amateur Football League
- 2018: 13th, Centre (Moscow Oblast) Group A
Home colours	Away colours

FC Saturn Moscow Oblast (Russian: ФК "Сатурн Московская область") was an association football club from Russia founded in 1991 and playing on professional level between 1993 and 2010. Since 2004 it was the farm club of FC Saturn Moscow Oblast. In early 2011, the parent club FC Saturn Moscow Oblast went bankrupt and dropped out of the Russian Premier League due to huge debts. However, Saturn-2 passed the licensing and participated in the Russian Second Division.

== Historical team names and home cities ==
- 1991–1992: FC Kosmos Dolgoprudny
- 1993: FC Kosmos-Kvest Dolgoprudny
- 1994–1998: FC Kosmos Dolgoprudny
- 1999–2002: FC Kosmos Elektrostal
- 2002–2003: FC Kosmos Yegoryevsk
- 2004–2007: FC Saturn Yegoryevsk
- 2007–2011: FC Saturn-2 Moscow Oblast
- 2011–present: FC Saturn Moscow Oblast

== Current squad ==
As of May 29, 2012, according to the RFS website.

Note: Flags indicate national team as defined under FIFA eligibility rules; some limited exceptions apply. Players may hold more than one non-FIFA nationality.

No.	Pos.	Nation	Player
—	GK	(Russia) RUS	Sergei Burkin
—	GK	(Russia) RUS	Valeri Chizhov
—	GK	(Russia) RUS	Danil Lyamin
—	DF	(Russia) RUS	Aleksandr Glebov
—	DF	(Russia) RUS	Dmitri Seryozhkin

No.	Pos.	Nation	Player
—	DF	(Russia) RUS	Dmitri Shikhovtsev
—	MF	(Russia) RUS	Tikhon Osipov
—	MF	(Russia) RUS	Roman Razdelkin
—	FW	(Russia) RUS	Aleksei Khotulev
—	FW	(Russia) RUS	Sergey Pchyolkin
