= Yusuf Otubanjo =

Nigerian footballer

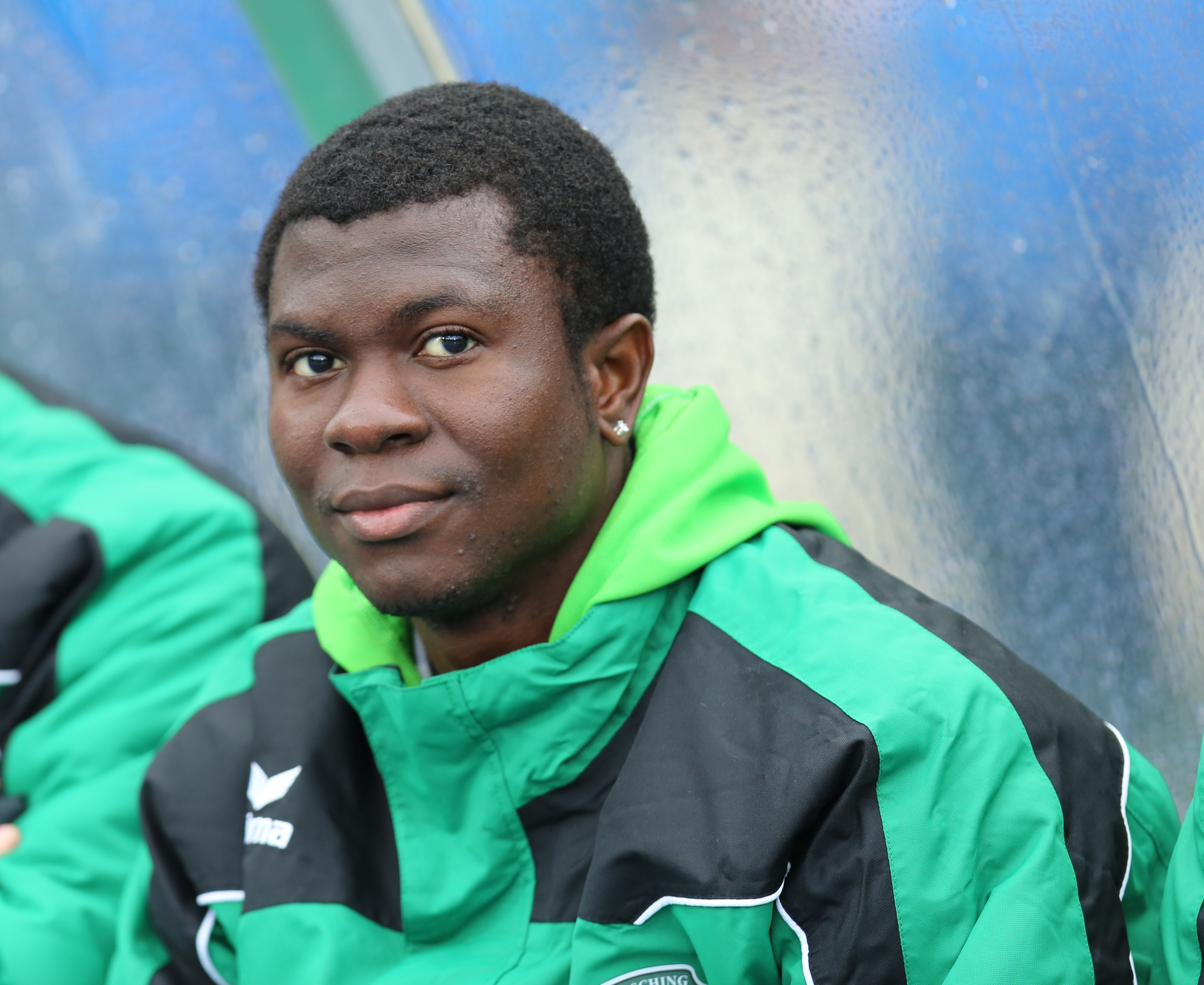
- Otubanjo in 2013

Personal information
- Full name: Yusuf Olaitan Otubanjo
- Date of birth: 12 September 1992 (age 34)
- Place of birth: Ijebu Ode, Nigeria
- Height: 1.77 m (5 ft 10 in)
- Position: Striker

Team information
- Current team: Nasaf
- Number: 20

Youth career
- –2009: Emmanuel Amunike Academy

Senior career*
Years	Team	Apps	(Gls)
2009	Julius Berger Football Club		
2009–2010	Gateway United F.C.		
2010–2011	Crown F.C.		
2011–2012	Atlético Madrid C		
2012–2014	Red Bull Salzburg	1	(0)
2013–2014	→ FC Pasching (loan)	19	(6)
2015–2016	Blau-Weiß Linz	39	(34)
2016–2018	MŠK Žilina	33	(10)
2018	→ Rheindorf Altach (loan)	11	(1)
2018–2019	LASK	21	(2)
2020–2022	Ararat-Armenia	58	(26)
2022–2025	Pyunik	86	(52)
2025–	Nasaf	15	(4)

International career
2009	Nigeria U-17	2	(0)
- * Club domestic league appearances and goals as of 29 July 2026

Yusuf Otubanjo (born 12 September 1992) is a Nigerian professional footballer who plays as a striker for Uzbekistan Super League club Nasaf.

== Career ==
=== Club ===
On 23 January 2020, Ararat-Armenia announced the signing of Otubanjo. On 4 June 2022, Ararat-Armenia announced that Otubanjo's contract had expired and he would leave the club.

On 11 June 2022, Otubanjo signed for fellow Armenian Premier League club Pyunik.

On 29 July 2025, Uzbekistan Super League club Nasaf announced the signing of Otubanjo.

== Career statistics ==
=== Club ===
As of match played 29 November 2025

Appearances and goals by club, season and competition
Club	Season	League			National cup (Note: Includes Austrian Cup, Slovenian Cup, Armenian Cup)		Continental		Other		Total	
Club	Season	Division	Apps	Goals	Apps	Goals	Apps	Goals	Apps	Goals	Apps	Goals
Red Bull Salzburg	2012–13	Austrian Bundesliga	1	0	0	0	0	0	–		1	0
Red Bull Salzburg	2013–14	Austrian Bundesliga	0	0	0	0	0	0	–		0	0
Red Bull Salzburg	Total		1	0	0	0	0	0	–		1	0
Pasching (loan)	2012–13	Austrian Regionalliga Central	2	0	0	0	–		–		2	0
Pasching (loan)	2013–14	Austrian Regionalliga Central	17	6	3	0	–		–		20	6
Pasching (loan)	Total		19	6	3	0	–		–		22	6
Blau-Weiß Linz	2014–15	Austrian Regionalliga Central	13	6	0	0	–		–		13	6
Blau-Weiß Linz	2015–16	Austrian Regionalliga Central	26	28	1	0	–		–		27	28
Blau-Weiß Linz	Total		39	34	1	0	–		–		40	34
MŠK Žilina	2016–17	Slovak First Football League	18	8	3	3	–		–		21	11
MŠK Žilina	2017–18	Slovak First Football League	15	2	3	5	2 (Note: Appearances in UEFA Champions League)	1	–		20	8
MŠK Žilina	Total		33	10	6	8	2	1	–		41	19
SCR Altach (loan)	2017–18	Austrian Bundesliga	11	1	0	0	–		–		11	1
LASK	2018–19	Austrian Bundesliga	19	2	4	3	4 (Note: Appearances in UEFA Europa League)	0	–		27	5
LASK	2019–20	Austrian Bundesliga	2	0	2	1	2	0	–		6	1
LASK	Total		21	2	6	4	6	0	–		33	6
Ararat-Armenia	2019–20	Armenian Premier League	13	7	3	2	0	0	0	0	16	9
Ararat-Armenia	2020–21	Armenian Premier League	21	10	4	0	4 (Note: One appearances in UEFA Champions League, three appearances in UEFA Europa League)	0	1 (Note: Appearance in Armenian Supercup)	0	30	10
Ararat-Armenia	2021–22	Armenian Premier League	24	9	2	1	–		–		26	10
Ararat-Armenia	Total		58	26	9	3	4	0	1	0	72	29
Pyunik	2022–23	Armenian Premier League	30	17	2	1	14 (Note: Six appearances and one goal in UEFA Champions League, two appearances in UEFA Europa League, six appearances and two goal in UEFA Europa Conference League)	3	–		46	21
Pyunik	2023–24	Armenian Premier League	31	21	3	0	6 (Note: Appearances in UEFA Europa Conference League)	0	–		40	21
Pyunik	2024–25	Armenian Premier League	24	14	2	0	7 (Note: Two appearances and zero goals in UEFA Champions League, five appearances and two goal in the UEFA Conference League.)	2	1	0	35	16
Pyunik	2025–26	Armenian Premier League	0	0	0	0	3	2	–		3	2
Pyunik	Total		86	52	7	1	30	7	1	0	124	60
Nasaf	2025	Uzbekistan Super League	9	2	0	0	3 (Note: Appearances in AFC Champions League)	0	–		12	2
Career total			277	133	32	16	45	8	2	0	356	157

== Honours ==
Pyunik

- Armenian Premier League: 2023–24

MŠK Žilina

- Slovak First Football League: 2016–17

Ararat-Armenia

- Armenian Premier League: 2019–20

Individual

- UEFA Europa Conference League Goal of the Group Stage: 2022–23
