= Anton Bratkov =

Ukrainian footballer

Anton Bratkov Антон Братков
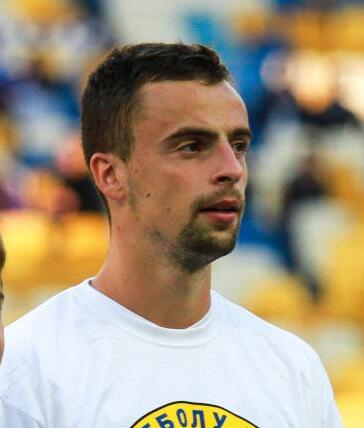

Personal information
- Full name: Anton Viktorovych Bratkov
- Date of birth: 14 May 1993 (age 33)
- Place of birth: Kirovohrad, Ukraine
- Height: 1.85 m (6 ft 1 in)
- Position: Centre back

Team information
- Current team: Urartu
- Number: 18

Youth career
- 2006–2007: FC Vidradnyi Kyiv
- 2007–2010: Dynamo Kyiv

Senior career*
Years	Team	Apps	(Gls)
2010–2016	Dynamo Kyiv	0	(0)
2013–2016	→ Dynamo-2 Kyiv	74	(9)
2016	Veres Rivne	0	(0)
2016–2018	Desna Chernihiv	37	(0)
2018	Zirka Kropyvnytskyi	13	(0)
2018	Desna Chernihiv	16	(0)
2019	Maccabi Petah Tikva	1	(0)
2019–2020	Lviv	30	(0)
2020	Metalist 1925 Kharkiv	9	(0)
2021–2025	Pyunik Yerevan	107	(1)
2025–	Urartu	33	(2)

International career
2008–2009	Ukraine U16	18	(0)
2009–2010	Ukraine U17	9	(0)
2010–2011	Ukraine U18	8	(1)
2010–2012	Ukraine U19	25	(1)
2012	Ukraine U20	3	(0)
2012–2014	Ukraine U21	9	(0)
- * Club domestic league appearances and goals as of 10 November 2026

Anton Bratkov (Ukrainian: Антон Вікторович Братков; born 14 May 1993) is a Ukrainian professional footballer who plays as a centre back for Urartu.

== Career ==
Bratkov is a product of the FC Vidradnyi and FC Dynamo Kyiv youth sportive schools and signed 3,5 years contract with FC Dynamo in the Ukrainian Premier League in December 2012.

=== Dynamo-2 Kyiv ===
In 2011 he started to play for Dynamo-2 Kyiv for three season in Ukrainian First League.

=== Desna Chernihiv ===
In 2016 he moved to Desna Chernihiv, the main club of the city of Chernihiv. Here he got promoted in Ukrainian Premier League after the season 2017–18 of Ukrainian First League.

=== Zirka Kropyvnytskyi ===
In 2018 he played 13 matches with Zirka Kropyvnytskyi in Ukrainian First League.

=== Desna Chernihiv ===
In 2018 he moved back to Desna Chernihiv in Ukrainian Premier League where he played 16 matches in Ukrainian Premier League in the season 2018–19 helping the club to stay in the top league without relegate.

=== Maccabi Petah Tikva ===
In January 2019 he moved he terminated his contracts with the club of Chernihiv by mutual consent and he moved to Maccabi Petah Tikva in Liga Leumit where he played 1 match in the season 2018–19.

=== Lviv ===
In 2019 he moved to Lviv, where he played 30 matches in Ukrainian Premier League.

=== Metalist 1925 Kharkiv ===
In 2020 he moved to Metalist 1925 Kharkiv, where he contribute for the promotion to Ukrainian Premier League after the season 2020–21 in Ukrainian First League.

=== Pyunik Yerevan ===
In 2021 he moved to Pyunik Yerevan in Armenian Premier League. Here in played nine matches in the 2020–21 Armenian Premier League season and one match in the 2020–21 Armenian Cup. He won the 2021–22 Armenian Premier League, qualifying for the 2022–23 UEFA Champions League. On 5 July 2022 he played against CFR Cluj in the first qualifying round of the Champions League, eventually exiting to tournament in the third qualifying round against Red Star Belgrade. In june 2025 his contract was expired after four years he left the club.

=== Urartu ===
In June 2025 he signed for Urartu in Armenian Premier League.

== International career ==
In 2012 he was called up by the Ukraine under-21 side, with whom he earned second place in the 2013 Commonwealth of Independent States Cup. In 2014 iteration, he won the tournament.

== Career statistics ==
=== Club ===
As of match played 10 November 2026

Appearances and goals by club, season and competition
Club	Season	League			Cup		Europe		Other		Total	
Club	Season	Division	Apps	Goals	Apps	Goals	Apps	Goals	Apps	Goals	Apps	Goals
Dynamo-2 Kyiv	2013–14	Ukrainian First League	19	3	0	0	0	0	0	0	19	3
Dynamo-2 Kyiv	2014–15	Ukrainian First League	27	1	0	0	0	0	0	0	27	1
Dynamo-2 Kyiv	2015–16	Ukrainian First League	28	5	0	0	0	0	0	0	28	5
Veres Rivne	2016–17	Ukrainian First League	0	0	0	0	0	0	0	0	0	0
Desna Chernihiv	2016–17	Ukrainian First League	16	0	2	0	0	0	0	0	18	0
Desna Chernihiv	2017–18	Ukrainian First League	21	0	4	0	0	0	0	0	25	0
Zirka Kropyvnytskyi	2017–18	Ukrainian First League	13	0	2	0	0	0	0	0	15	0
Desna Chernihiv	2018–19	Ukrainian Premier League	16	0	1	0	0	0	0	0	17	0
Maccabi Petah Tikva	2018–19	Liga Leumit	1	0	1	0	0	0	0	0	2	0
Lviv	2019–20	Ukrainian Premier League	30	0	2	0	0	0	0	0	32	0
Metalist 1925 Kharkiv	2020–21	Ukrainian First League	9	0	0	0	0	0	0	0	9	0
Pyunik Yerevan	2020–21	Armenian Premier League	9	0	1	0	0	0	0	0	10	0
Pyunik Yerevan	2021–22	Armenian Premier League	28	0	2	0	0	0	0	0	30	0
Pyunik Yerevan	2022–23	Armenian Premier League	19	0	0	0	9 (Note: Nine appearances in UEFA Champions League first qualifying round)	0	0	0	28	0
Pyunik Yerevan	2023–24	Armenian Premier League	33	1	3	0	6	0	0	0	42	1
Pyunik Yerevan	2024–25	Armenian Premier League	18	0	2	1	6 (Note: six appearances in UEFA Champions League first qualifying round)	0	0	0	26	1
Urartu	2025–26	Armenian Premier League	23	2	3	0	1 (Note: one appearance in 2025–26 UEFA Europa Conference League Second qualifying round)	0	0	0	27	2
Urartu	2026–27	Armenian Premier League	10	0	0	0	0	0	0	0	10	0
Urartu	Total		33	2	3	0	1	0	0	0	37	2
Career total			320	12	23	1	22	0	0	0	365	13

== Honours ==
Pyunik

- Armenian Premier League: 2021–22, 2023–24
- Armenian Super Cup: 2022, Runner Up 2024

Metalist 1925 Kharkiv

- Ukrainian First League: 2020–21

Desna Chernihiv

- Ukrainian First League: 2017–18
- Ukrainian First League: Runner Up 2016–17

Veres Rivne

- Ukrainian Second League: 2015–16

Dynamo-2 Kyiv

- Ukrainian Premier League Reserves: 2015–16

Urartu

- Armenian Cup runner-up: 2025–26

Ukraine national under-21

- Commonwealth of Independent States Cup: 2014
- Commonwealth of Independent States Cup: Runner-up 2013
