= Bryan Alceus =

Footballer (born 1996)

Personal information
- Date of birth: 1 February 1996 (age 30)
- Place of birth: Colombes, France
- Height: 1.75 m (5 ft 9 in)
- Position: Midfielder

Youth career
- –2014: Bordeaux

Senior career*
| Years | Team | Apps | (Gls) |
| 2014–2016 | Bordeaux B | 17 | (0) |
| 2017 | Cozes | 11 | (0) |
| 2017–2018 | Stade Bordelais | 5 | (0) |
| 2018–2019 | Entente SSG | 1 | (0) |
| 2019 | C'Chartres | 2 | (0) |
| 2019–2020 | Paris FC | 4 | (0) |
| 2020 | → Bastia-Borgo (loan) | 4 | (0) |
| 2020–2022 | Gaz Metan Mediaș | 44 | (0) |
| 2022 | Zira | 5 | (0) |
| 2022–2023 | Argeș Pitești | 16 | (0) |
| 2023 | → Olympiakos Nicosia (loan) | 18 | (0) |
| 2023–2024 | Doxa Katokopias | 31 | (0) |
| 2024–2025 | Pyunik | 17 | (0) |
| 2025 | Politehnica Iași | 3 | (0) |

International career^{‡}
| 2015 | Haiti U20 | 3 | (0) |
| 2016– | Haiti | 40 | (0) |
Medal record
Representing Haiti
Men's football
CONCACAF Gold Cup
| Third place | 2019 Costa Rica-Jamaica-United States |
- * Club domestic league appearances and goals as of 10 November 2025 ‡ National team caps and goals as of 18 November 2024

Bryan Alceus (born 1 February 1996) is a professional footballer who plays as a midfielder. Born in France, he plays for the Haiti national team.

== Club career ==
Alceus previously played for Stade Bordelais, having started his career at Bordeaux.

On 27 January 2022, Alceus signed a two-and-a-half-year contract with Azerbaijani club Zira.

On 19 August 2024, Armenian Premier League club Pyunik announced the signing of Alceus from Doxa Katokopias. On 9 June 2025, Pyunik announced that Alceus had left the club.

== International career ==
Alceus debuted for Haiti in a 3–1 friendly loss to Colombia on 29 May 2016.

== Career statistics ==
As of 18 November 2024

Appearances and goals by national team and year
| National team | Year | Apps | Goals |
|---|---|---|---|
| Haiti | 2016 | 1 | 0 |
| Haiti | 2017 | 1 | 0 |
| Haiti | 2018 | 5 | 0 |
| Haiti | 2019 | 13 | 0 |
| Haiti | 2020 | 0 | 0 |
| Haiti | 2021 | 8 | 0 |
| Haiti | 2022 | 3 | 0 |
| Haiti | 2023 | 7 | 0 |
| Haiti | 2024 | 2 | 0 |
| Total | | 40 | 0 |

== Honours ==
Zira

- Azerbaijan Cup runner-up: 2021–22

Haiti

- CONCACAF Gold Cup third place: 2019
