= João Queirós =

Portuguese footballer

Personal information
- Full name: João Ricardo Pereira Queirós
- Date of birth: 22 April 1998 (age 28)
- Place of birth: Barroselas, Portugal
- Height: 1.90 m (6 ft 3 in)
- Position: Centre-back

Team information
- Current team: Feirense

Youth career
- 2006–2008: Barroselas
- 2008–2010: Póvoa Lanhoso
- 2010–2011: Benfica
- 2011–2012: Dragon Force
- 2012: Barroselas
- 2013: Artur Rego
- 2013: Barroselas
- 2014: Palmeiras Braga
- 2014–2017: Braga

Senior career*
Years	Team	Apps	(Gls)
2017	Braga B	1	(0)
2017–2021	1. FC Köln II	19	(0)
2018–2019	→ Sporting CP U23 (loan)	13	(0)
2019–2020	→ Willem II (loan)	0	(0)
2021–2024	Chaves	15	(0)
2021	→ Pedras Salgadas (loan)	5	(0)
2024	Mafra	9	(0)
2024–2026	Ararat-Armenia	53	(3)
2026–	Feirense		

International career
2015–2016	Portugal U18	5	(1)
2016–2017	Portugal U19	13	(1)
2017–2018	Portugal U20	6	(0)
2018	Portugal U21	1	(0)
Medal record
Men's football
Representing Portugal
UEFA European Under-19 Championship
Runner-up	2017 Georgia
- * Club domestic league appearances and goals as of 21:42, 28 June 2026 (UTC)

João Ricardo Pereira Queirós (born 22 April 1998) is a Portuguese professional footballer who plays as a centre-back for Liga Portugal 2 club Feirense.

== Club career ==
Born in Barroselas, Viana do Castelo, Queirós played youth football for a host of clubs, joining S.C. Braga at the age of 16. On 21 May 2017, in the last day of the season and while still a junior, he made his senior debut with the reserves, featuring the full 90 minutes in a 1–1 home draw against Sporting CP B in the Segunda Liga.

On 18 July 2017, Queirós signed a five-year contract with Bundesliga team 1. FC Köln. During his tenure in Germany, however, he was solely associated to the reserve side.

Queirós returned to his homeland in June 2018, joining Sporting CP and being assigned to their newly created under-23 team. On 8 August 2019, still owned by Köln, he moved to Willem II of the Dutch Eredivisie.

In August 2021, Queirós was released from his contract and signed with second tier club G.D. Chaves. On 27 August 2022, as they were back in the Primeira Liga, he played his first match in the competition, as a 79th-minute substitute in the 2–0 away win over Sporting.

Queirós returned to the second division on 31 January 2024, joining C.D. Mafra. He went back abroad again in July, agreeing to a deal at Armenian Premier League's FC Ararat-Armenia. He won the national championship in his second season under his compatriot manager Tulipa, leaving on 15 June 2026 with competitive totals of 68 games and three goals.

Queirós went back to Portugal in October 2026, on a contract at C.D. Feirense.

== International career ==
Queirós won his only cap for Portugal at under-21 level on 25 May 2018, coming on as a late substitute in the 3–2 friendly victory over Italy in Estoril.

== Honours ==
Ararat-Armenia

- Armenian Premier League: 2025–26
- Armenian Supercup: 2024
