= João Paredes =

Portuguese footballer

Personal information
- Full name: João Diogo Marques Paredes
- Date of birth: 1 January 1996 (age 30)
- Place of birth: Figueira da Foz, Portugal
- Height: 1.90 m (6 ft 3 in)
- Position: Striker

Youth career
- 2005–2007: Naval
- 2007–2012: Sporting
- 2012–2014: Académica
- 2014–2015: Vitória Guimarães

Senior career*
Years	Team	Apps	(Gls)
2015–2017	Anadia	39	(16)
2017–2018	Vizela	24	(13)
2018–2020	Chaves	6	(0)
2018–2020	Chaves B	25	(14)
2019	→ Mafra (loan)	13	(0)
2020	Trofense	8	(2)
2021	União de Leiria	11	(3)
2021–2022	Oliveirense	25	(13)
2022–2024	Feirense	54	(2)
2024–2025	Pyunik	6	(0)
2025	Manama	0	(0)
2025–2026	Belenenses	10	(0)
2026	Sukhothai	11	(1)
- * Club domestic league appearances and goals as of 10 May 2026

João Diogo Marques Paredes (born 1 January 1996) is a Portuguese professional footballer who plays as a forward.

== Club career ==
On 28 June 2022, Paredes signed with Feirense.

On 7 July 2024, Armenian Premier League club Pyunik announced the signing of Paredes.
