= Nikita Alekseyev (footballer) =

Russian footballer (born 2002)

Personal information
- Full name: Nikita Sergeyevich Alekseyev
- Date of birth: 9 January 2002 (age 24)
- Place of birth: Lukino, Russia
- Height: 1.94 m (6 ft 4 in)
- Position: Goalkeeper

Youth career
- UOR #5 Yegoryevsk

Senior career*
Years	Team	Apps	(Gls)
2022	Nosta Novotroitsk	6	(0)
2022–2025	Ural-2 Yekaterinburg	28	(0)
2022–2023	Ural Yekaterinburg	1	(0)
2025	Ural Yekaterinburg	0	(0)
2025	→ Pyunik (loan)	0	(0)
2025–2026	Kyrgyzaltyn	10	(0)
- * Club domestic league appearances and goals as of 7 November 2025

Nikita Sergeyevich Alekseyev (Russian: Никита Сергеевич Алексеев; born 9 January 2002) is a Russian footballer who plays as a goalkeeper.

== Career ==
Alekseyev made his debut for Ural Yekaterinburg on 31 August 2022 in a Russian Cup game against PFC Sochi. He made his Russian Premier League debut for Ural on 11 September 2022 against Torpedo Moscow. He saved a penalty kick and kept a clean sheet in a 2–0 Ural victory.

== Career statistics ==
As of 27 November 2022

Appearances and goals by club, season and competition
Club	Season	League			Cup		Continental		Total	
Club	Season	Division	Apps	Goals	Apps	Goals	Apps	Goals	Apps	Goals
Nosta Novotroitsk	2021–22	Russian Second League	2	0	–		–		2	0
Nosta Novotroitsk	2022–23	Russian Second League	4	0	–		–		4	0
Nosta Novotroitsk	Total		6	0	0	0	0	0	6	0
Ural-2 Yekaterinburg	2022–23	Russian Second League	3	0	–		–		3	0
Ural Yekaterinburg	2022–23	Russian Premier League	1	0	2	0	–		3	0
Career total			10	0	2	0	0	0	12	0
