= David Davidyan =

Russian-Armenian footballer

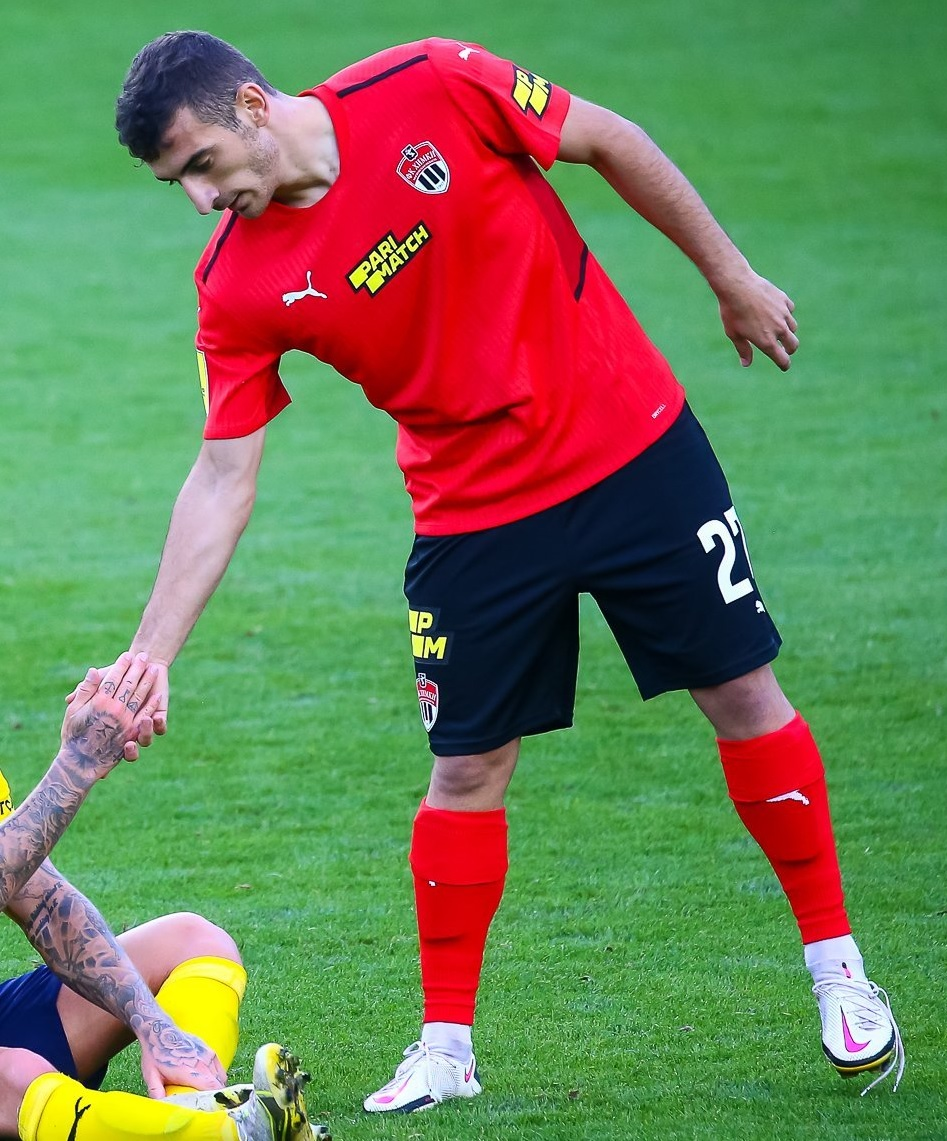
- Davidyan with FC Khimki in 2021

Personal information
- Full name: David Rudikovich Davidyan
- Date of birth: 14 December 1997 (age 28)
- Place of birth: Nizhny Novgorod, Russia
- Height: 1.73 m (5 ft 8 in)
- Positions: Midfielder; right-back

Team information
- Current team: Arsenal Tula
- Number: 9

Youth career
- –2015: Olimpiyets Nizhny Novgorod

Senior career*
Years	Team	Apps	(Gls)
2016–2017	Nosta Novotroitsk	23	(2)
2017–2018	Ararat Moscow	12	(4)
2018–2019	Ararat-Armenia	3	(0)
2019–2020	Ararat Yerevan	19	(1)
2020–2021	Alashkert	19	(5)
2021–2023	Khimki	5	(0)
2022–2023	→ Pyunik (loan)	24	(1)
2023–2025	Pyunik	47	(1)
2025–2026	Rotor Volgograd	27	(5)
2026–	Arsenal Tula	8	(0)

International career^{‡}
2023–	Armenia	5	(0)
- * Club domestic league appearances and goals as of 29 August 2026 ‡ National team caps and goals as of 9 June 2026

David Rudikovich Davidyan (Armenian: Դավիթ Ռուդիկի Դավիդյան; Russian: Давид Рудикович Давидян; born 14 December 1997) is a professional footballer who plays for Arsenal Tula. Born in Russia, he plays for the Armenia national team. He most often plays in the right winger position.

== Club career ==
On 8 August 2021, Russian Premier League club FC Khimki announced the signing of Davidyan. He made his debut in the RPL for Khimki later on the same day in a game against FC Rostov, he substituted Senin Sebai in added time.

On 5 July 2022, Davidyan joined FC Pyunik on loan for the 2022–23 season. On 24 June 2023, Pyunik announced the permanent signing of Davidyan on a contract until the summer of 2025. He left the club after his contract expired.

On 23 June 2025, Davidyan signed a contract with Rotor Volgograd.

== International career ==
He was born and raised in Russia, but is eligible to represent Armenia. He was called up to the Armenia national football team in June 2021 for friendlies, but did not make his debut due to an injury.

Davidyan debuted for Armenia in a friendly 2–2 draw with Cyprus on 28 March 2023.

== Career statistics ==
=== Club ===
As of match played 23 May 2026

Appearances and goals by club, season and competition
Club	Season	League			National Cup		Continental		Other		Total	
Club	Season	Division	Apps	Goals	Apps	Goals	Apps	Goals	Apps	Goals	Apps	Goals
Nosta Novotroitsk	2016–17	Russian Second League	22	2	1	0	—		—		23	2
Ararat Moscow	2017–18	Russian Second League	12	4	2	0	—		—		14	4
Ararat-Armenia	2018–19	Armenian Premier League	3	0	0	0	—		—		3	0
Ararat Yerevan	2019–20	Armenian Premier League	19	1	1	0	—		—		20	1
Alashkert	2020–21	Armenian Premier League	19	5	7	2	0 (Note: Appearances in the UEFA Europa League)	0	—		26	7
Alashkert	2021–22	Armenian Premier League	0	0	0	0	4 (Note: Appearances in the UEFA Champions League)	0	—		4	0
Alashkert	Total		19	5	7	2	4	0	0	0	30	7
Khimki	2021–22	Russian Premier League	5	0	1	0	—		—		6	0
Pyunik (loan)	2022–23	Armenian Premier League	24	1	2	0	5 (Note: Five appearances in the UEFA Champions League, zero appearances in the UEFA Europa League and UEFA Europa Conference League)	0	—		31	1
Pyunik	2023–24	Armenian Premier League	31	1	2	0	6 (Note: Appearances in the UEFA Conference League)	0	—		39	1
Pyunik	2024–25	Armenian Premier League	16	0	4	0	8 (Note: Two appearances in the UEFA Champions League, six appearances in the UEFA Conference League)	0	—		28	0
Pyunik	Total		47	1	6	2	14	0	0	0	67	1
Rotor Volgograd	2025–26	Russian First League	27	5	0	0	—		1 (Note: Appearance in promotion play-offs)	0	28	5
Career total			178	19	20	2	23	0	1	0	222	21

=== International ===
As of match played 9 June 2026

Appearances and goals by national team and year
National team	Year	Apps	Goals
Armenia	2023	1	0
Armenia	2024	2	0
Armenia	2026	2	0
Total		5	0

== Honours ==
Pyunik Yerevan

- Armenian Premier League: 2023–24

FC Alashkert

- Armenian Premier League: 2020–21
