= Bunyamudin Mustafayev =

Russian footballer

Personal information
- Full name: Bunyamudin Arifovich Mustafayev
- Date of birth: 7 September 1992 (age 34)
- Place of birth: Akhty, Russia
- Height: 1.85 m (6 ft 1 in)
- Positions: Defender; forward; midfielder

Team information
- Current team: Gandzasar Kapan
- Number: 20

Senior career*
Years	Team	Apps	(Gls)
2011–2013	Kuban Krasnodar	0	(0)
2012–2013	→ Torpedo Armavir (loan)	33	(4)
2014–2015	Chernomorets Novorossiysk	33	(4)
2016	Fakel Voronezh	12	(0)
2016–2017	Armavir	37	(2)
2019	Mashuk-KMV Pyatigorsk	16	(0)
2020	Kafa Feodosia		
2021	LFK Kuban Krasnodar		
2021	Tuapse	16	(0)
2021–2022	Metallurg Vidnoye	23	(3)
2023–2024	Turkistan	25	(0)
2024	Trudovye Rezervy Moscow		
2024–	Gandzasar Kapan	7	(0)
- * Club domestic league appearances and goals as of 23 October 2024

Bunyamudin Arifovich Mustafayev (Russian: Буньямудин Арифович Мустафаев; born 7 September 1992) is a Russian football player who plays for Armenian club Gandzasar Kapan.

== Club career ==
He made his debut in the Russian Second Division for Torpedo Armavir on 31 July 2013 in a game against MITOS Novocherkassk.

He made his Russian Football National League debut for Fakel Voronezh on 12 March 2016 in a game against Tyumen.
