= FC Kompozit Pavlovsky Posad =

Kompozit Pavlovsky Posad
- Full name: Football Club Kompozit Pavlovsky Posad
- Founded: 2022
- Dissolved: 2025
- Chairman: Valery Gusarov
- Manager: Dmitri Seryozhkin
- 2024: Russian Second League; Division B Group 3, 3rd
Home colours

FC Kompozit Pavlovsky Posad (Russian: ФК «Композит» Павловский Посад) was a Russian football club based in Pavlovsky Posad.

The club was founded in 2022 and entered amateur competitions.

For the 2023 season, the club was admitted to the newly organized fourth-tier Russian Second League Division B.

In January 2025, Kompozit was merged into FC Znamya Truda Orekhovo-Zuyevo.
