= Serhiy Vakulenko =

Ukrainian footballer

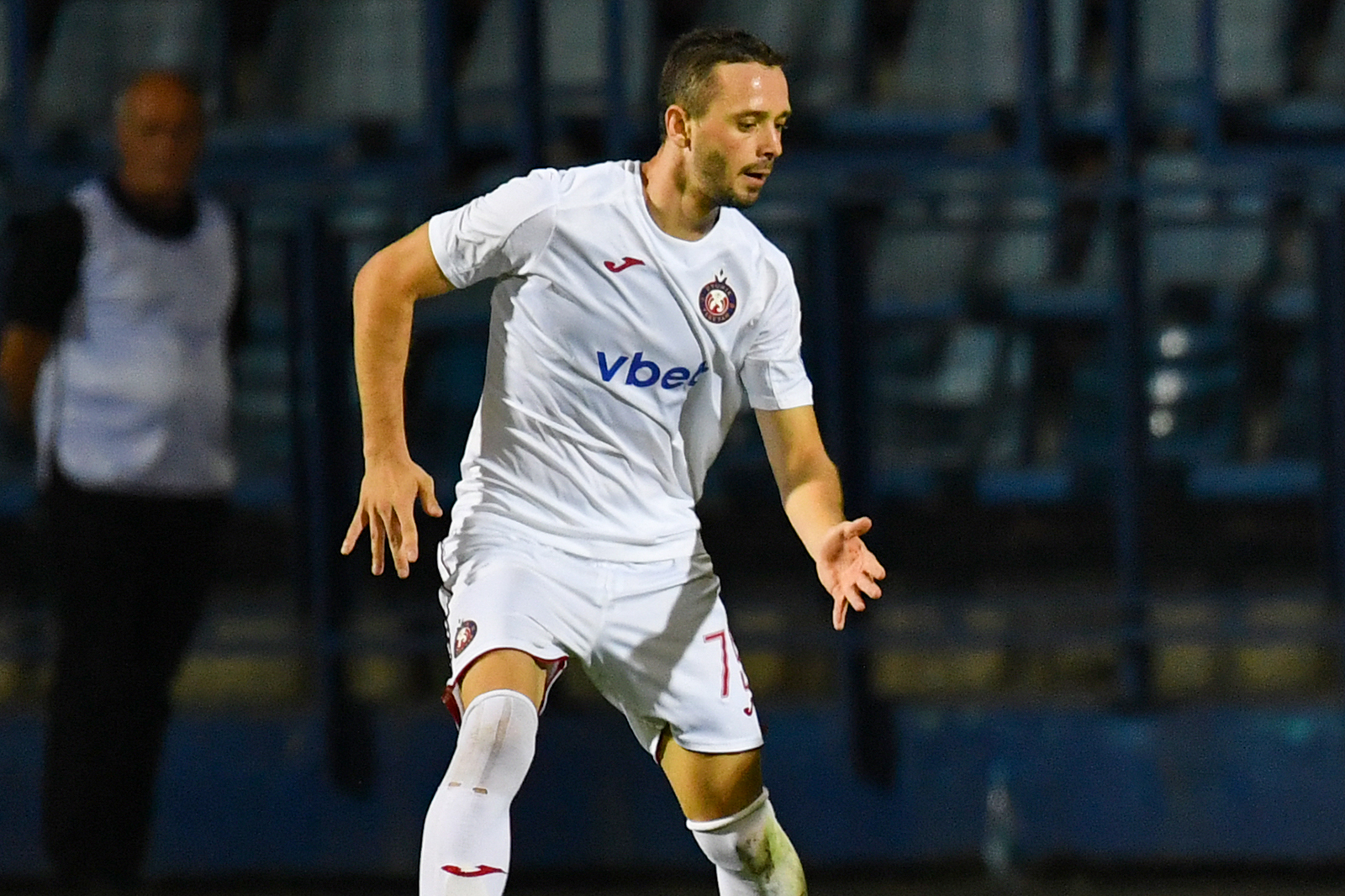
- Vakulenko with Pyunik in 2022

Personal information
- Full name: Serhiy Mykolaiovych Vakulenko
- Date of birth: 7 September 1993 (age 33)
- Place of birth: Kharkiv, Ukraine
- Height: 1.83 m (6 ft 0 in)
- Position: Midfielder

Team information
- Current team: Pyunik Yerevan
- Number: 79

Youth career
- 2006–2008: UFK Kharkiv
- 2009–2010: Illichivets Mariupol

Senior career*
Years	Team	Apps	(Gls)
2010–2019	Shakhtar Donetsk	0	(0)
2010–2011	→ Shakhtar-3 Donetsk	27	(5)
2015–2017	→ Mariupol (loan)	76	(18)
2018	→ Olimpik Donetsk (loan)	21	(2)
2019	→ Arsenal Kyiv (loan)	12	(7)
2019	Karpaty Lviv	16	(0)
2020–2022	Ararat-Armenia	50	(5)
2022–	Pyunik Yerevan	64	(2)

International career
2008	Ukraine-16	2	(0)
2009–2010	Ukraine-17	5	(0)
2011	Ukraine-18	6	(0)
2011–2012	Ukraine-19	12	(0)
2012	Ukraine-20	1	(0)
2014	Ukraine-21	8	(1)
- * Club domestic league appearances and goals as of 18 June 2026

Serhiy Mykolaiovych Vakulenko (Ukrainian: Сергій Миколайович Вакуленко; born 7 September 1993) is a Ukrainian professional footballer who plays as a midfielder for Armenian Premier League club Pyunik.

== Career ==
Vakulenko is a product of the UFK Kharkiv and FC Shakhtar youth sportive schools.

=== Ararat-Armenia ===
On 6 June 2022, Ararat-Armenia announced that Vakulenko's contract had expired and he would leave the club.

=== Pyunik Yerevan ===
In Summer 2022, he signed for Pyunik Yerevan just champion of Armenian Premier League in the season 2021–22.

== National team ==
He was called up to play for the 23-man squad of the Ukraine national under-21 football team by trainer Serhiy Kovalets in the Commonwealth of Independent States Cup in January 2014.

== Career statistics ==
=== Club ===
As of match played 23 April 2025

Appearances and goals by club, season and competition
Club	Season	League			National Cup		Continental		Other		Total	
Club	Season	Division	Apps	Goals	Apps	Goals	Apps	Goals	Apps	Goals	Apps	Goals
Ararat-Armenia	2019–20	Armenian Premier League	10	3	2	0	0 (Note: Zero appearances in the UEFA Champions League & zero appearances in the UEFA Europa League)	0	0 (Note: Appearances in the Armenian Supercup)	0	12	3
Ararat-Armenia	2020–21	Armenian Premier League	15	1	4	0	4 (Note: One appearances in the UEFA Champions League & three appearances and two goals in the UEFA Europa League)	2	1	0	24	3
Ararat-Armenia	2021–22	Armenian Premier League	25	1	2	0	-		-		27	0
Ararat-Armenia	Total		50	5	8	0	4	2	1	0	63	7
Pyunik	2022–23	Armenian Premier League	5	0	0	0	8 (Note: Two appearances in the UEFA Champions League, two appearances in the UEFA Europa League and four appearances in the UEFA Europa Conference League)	0	-		13	0
Pyunik	2023–24	Armenian Premier League	23	0	3	0	0 (Note: Appearances in the UEFA Europa League)	0	-		26	0
Pyunik	2024–25	Armenian Premier League	13	0	1	0	5 (Note: Two appearances in the UEFA Champions League and three appearances in the UEFA Europa Conference League)	0	0	0	19	0
Pyunik	Total		41	0	4	0	13	0	0	0	58	0
Career total			91	5	12	0	17	2	1	0	121	7

== Honours ==
Pyunik

- Armenian Premier League: 2023–24
- Armenian Super Cup: 2022

Ararat-Armenia

- Armenian Premier League (1): 2019–20
- Armenian Premier League (1): Runner Up 2021–22

Ukraine U21

- Commonwealth of Independent States Cup: 2014
