= Joël Bopesu =

Congolese footballer (born 1995)

Personal information
- Date of birth: 25 January 1995 (age 31)
- Place of birth: Kinshasa, Zaire
- Height: 1.84 m (6 ft 0 in)
- Position: Left back

Team information
- Current team: Panevėžys
- Number: 95

Youth career
- –2013: Toulouse
- 2013–2014: Châteauroux

Senior career*
Years	Team	Apps	(Gls)
2014–2015	Arles-Avignon	1	(0)
2015–2016	Épinal	19	(1)
2016–2017	Calais	20	(2)
2018	Skopje	18	(1)
2018	Rabotnichki	18	(0)
2019	Riga	24	(2)
2020	Lviv	13	(0)
2020	Canet Roussillon	0	(0)
2021–2024	Žalgiris	113	(7)
2025	Pyunik	12	(2)
2026–	Panevėžys	20	(1)
- * Club domestic league appearances and goals as of 31 August 2026

Joël Bopesu (born 25 January 1995) is a Congolese professional footballer who plays as a right-back for Panevėžys Club. He formerly played for Arles-Avignon, where he made one appearance in Ligue 2, coming on as a substitute for Téji Savanier in the 4–1 win against Orléans on 15 May 2015. Besides France, he has played in North Macedonia, Latvia, Ukraine and Lithuania.

== Career ==
After one year with Épinal, one year with Calais, six months with FK Skopje and six months again with FK Rabotnički, he moved to Riga FC in February 2019.

=== FK Panevėžys ===
On 29 January 2026 m. officially announced that FK Panevėžys signed with Joël Bopesu.
