= Matas Vareika =

Lithuanian footballer

Personal information
- Date of birth: 27 January 2000 (age 26)
- Place of birth: Jonava, Lithuania
- Height: 1.74 m (5 ft 9 in)
- Position: Left winger

Team information
- Current team: Žalgiris (on loan from Pyunik)
- Number: 27

Youth career
- 2014–2016: NFA

Senior career*
Years	Team	Apps	(Gls)
2016–2018	NFA	25	(8)
2019–2023	Žalgiris	36	(5)
2024	Hegelmann	32	(10)
2025–	Pyunik	23	(7)
2026–	→ Žalgiris (loan)	14	(5)

International career^{‡}
2016–2017	Lithuania U17	9	(2)
2017–2018	Lithuania U19	14	(3)
2018–2019	Lithuania U21	6	(0)
2024–	Lithuania	4	(0)
- * Club domestic league appearances and goals as of 17 September 2026 ‡ National team caps and goals as of 18 November 2026

Matas Vareika (born 27 January 2000) is a Lithuanian football player who plays as a left winger for Lithuanian club Žalgiris, on loan from Armenian club Pyunik, and the Lithuania national team.

== Career ==
=== Fk Žalgiris ===
On 3 March 2019 he made his debut for FK Žalgiris in A Lyga against FK Palanga.

On 20 November 2023, it was announced that Vareika left Žalgiris.

=== FC Hegelmann ===
On 30 December 2023 he signed with Hegelmann Club.

On 3 March 2024, Vareika made his debut in A Lyga match against Transinvest.

=== FC Pyunik ===
In January 2025 was broken contract with FC Hegelmann.

On 25 February 2025 made his debut in Armenian premier League against FC Alashkert. In this match Vareika scored goal and Pyunik won 2–0.

On 20 March 2026, Pyunik announced that Vareika had left the club to join Žalgiris on loan for the remainder of the year.

== International career ==
Vareika made his debut for the senior Lithuania national team on 26 March 2024 in a Nations League play-out game against Gibraltar.
