= 2022–23 FC Pyunik season =

Pyunik
2022-23 season
- Chairman: Rafik Hayrapetyan
- Manager: Yegishe Melikyan
- Stadium: Republican Stadium
- Premier League: 2nd
- Armenian Cup: Semifinal vs Shirak
- Armenian Supercup: Champions
- UEFA Champions League: Third qualifying round vs Red Star Belgrade
- UEFA Europa League: Playoff Round vs Sheriff Tiraspol
- UEFA Europa Conference League: Group Stage
- Top goalscorer: League: Two Players (17); All: Luka Juričić (22)
Home colours	Away colours

The 2022–23 season was Pyunik's 29th season in the Armenian Premier League.

== Season events ==
On 11 June, Pyunik announced the signing of Yusuf Otubanjo from Ararat-Armenia. The next day, 12 June, Pyunik announced the loan signing of Milad Jahani from Sepahan.

On 3 July, Pyunik announced the signings of Arthur Avagyan, Luka Juričić, Boris Varga, Andre Mensalao, Mikhail Kovalenko, Nemanja Mladenović, Marjan Radeski, Serhiy Vakulenko and David Davidyan.

On 19 July, Pyunik announced the signing of Alan Aussi on loan from Dynamo Kyiv.

On 13 August, Pyunik announced the signing of Aleksandar Miljković from Partizan.

On 21 August, Pyunik announced the signing of Roman Karasyuk from Rukh Lviv.

On 29 August, Pyunik announced the signing of Robert Hehedosh on loan from Peremoha Dnipro.

On 2 September, Pyunik announced the signing of Stefan Spirovski from MTK Budapest, Grenik Petrosyan from BKMA Yerevan and Aleksandr Karapetyan who was last at Alashkert.

On 7 September, Pyunik announced the signing of Dame Diop who'd last played for Dynamo České Budějovice.

On 13 September, Pyunik announced the signing of Kire Ristevski who'd last played for AEL Limassol.

On 24 December, Pyunik announced that David Yurchenko had left the club, whilst the following day, 25 December, Zoran Gajić also left the club after his contract expired.

On 27 December, Artak Dashyan extended his contract with Pyunik until the summer of 2024. On the same day, Pyunik announced that Alexander González, Uroš Nenadović and Renzo Zambrano were all leaving the club. The following day, 28 December, Pyunik announced that Aras Özbiliz had also left the club, and that they had signed Henri Avagyan from BKMA Yerevan.

On 29 December, Pyunik announced a new one-year contract for Eugeniu Cociuc, and that Boris Varga, Nemanja Mladenović, Marjan Radeski, Robert Hehedosh and Aleksandr Karapetyan had left the club.

On 11 January, Pyunik announced the signing of Jonel Désiré. The following day, 12 January, Pyunik announced the signing of Edgar Malakyan.

On 17 January, Pyunik announced that Andre Mensalao and Dame Diop had left the club.

On 18 January, Pyunik announced the signing of James Santos, who'd played for Alashkert during the first half of the season.

On 3 February, Hovhannes Harutyunyan extended his contract with Pyunik, until the summer of 2024.

On 7 February, Pyunik announced the singing of Juan Bravo, who'd played for Ararat Yerevan during the first half of the season.

On 8 February, Luka Juričić extended his contract with Pyunik until the end of the 2023/24 season. On the same day, the Football Federation of Armenia announced that Pyunik would be recognised as the 2022 Armenian Supercup Champions even the match had failed to take place due to various circumstances.

On 15 February, Pyunik announced the singing of Lucas Villela, who'd played for Liepāja during the first half of the season.

On 9 May, Stanislav Buchnev, Anton Bratkov, Serhiy Vakulenko and Mikhail Kovalenko all extended their contract with Pyunik until the summer of 2024.

== Squad ==
As of match played 6 June 2023

Number	Name	Nationality	Position	Date of birth (age)	Signed from	Signed in	Contract ends	Apps.	Goals
Goalkeepers
16	Henri Avagyan	(Armenia)	GK	21 July 2002 (aged 20)	BKMA Yerevan	2022		3	0
32	Sergey Mikaelyan	(Armenia)	GK	21 July 2002 (aged 20)	Academy	2020		1	0
71	Stanislav Buchnev	(Armenia)	GK	17 July 1990 (aged 32)	Fakel Voronezh	2020	2024	67	0
Defenders
4	Kire Ristevski	(North Macedonia)	DF	22 October 1990 (aged 32)	Unattached	2022		14	0
5	James Santos	(Brazil)	DF	15 July 1995 (aged 27)	Unattached	2023		13	2
6	Juninho	(Brazil)	DF	29 July 1995 (aged 27)	Unattached	2021		71	5
8	Juan Bravo	(Colombia)	DF	1 April 1990 (aged 33)	Unattacehd	2023		7	1
15	Mikhail Kovalenko	(Russia)	DF	25 January 1995 (aged 28)	Olimp-Dolgoprudny	2022	2024	43	2
21	Arthur Avagyan	(Armenia)	DF	4 July 1987 (aged 35)	Noravank	2022		10	0
27	Nikita Baranov	(Estonia)	DF	19 August 1992 (aged 30)	Ħamrun Spartans	2021		42	2
44	Alan Aussi	(Ukraine)	DF	30 June 2001 (aged 21)	on loan from Dynamo Kyiv	2022	2023	4	0
79	Serhiy Vakulenko	(Ukraine)	DF	7 September 1993 (aged 29)	Ararat-Armenia	2022	2024	13	0
90	Aleksandar Miljković	(Serbia)	DF	26 February 1990 (aged 33)	Partizan	2022		33	2
95	Anton Bratkov	(Ukraine)	DF	14 May 1993 (aged 30)	Metalist 1925 Kharkiv	2021	2024	68	0
Midfielders
7	Edgar Malakyan	(Armenia)	MF	22 September 1990 (aged 32)	Unattached	2023			
9	Artak Dashyan	(Armenia)	MF	20 November 1989 (aged 33)	Atyrau	2021	2024	64	6
10	Stefan Spirovski	(North Macedonia)	MF	23 August 1990 (aged 32)	MTK Budapest	2022		20	1
11	Hovhannes Harutyunyan	(Armenia)	MF	25 May 1999 (aged 24)	Ararat-Armenia	2021	2024	120	12
17	Roman Karasyuk	(Ukraine)	MF	27 March 1991 (aged 32)	Rukh Lviv	2022		26	0
20	Lucas Villela	(Brazil)	MF	24 March 1994 (aged 29)	Unattached	2023		17	1
29	Eugeniu Cociuc	(Moldova)	MF	11 May 1993 (aged 30)	Zimbru Chișinău	2022	2023	38	1
83	Vyacheslav Afyan	(Armenia)	MF	28 October 2005 (aged 17)	Academy	2022		1	0
85	Karlen Hovhannisyan	(Armenia)	MF	26 April 2005 (aged 18)	Academy	2023		1	0
88	Yuri Gareginyan	(Armenia)	MF	3 February 1994 (aged 29)	Noah	2021		46	0
97	David Davidyan	(Armenia)	MF	14 December 1997 (aged 25)	on loan from Khimki	2022		31	1
Forwards
2	Luka Juričić	(Bosnia and Herzegovina)	FW	25 November 1996 (aged 26)	Gimpo	2022	2024	41	22
12	Jonel Désiré	(Haiti)	FW	12 February 1997 (aged 26)	Unattached	2023		16	4
14	Yusuf Otubanjo	(Nigeria)	FW	12 September 1992 (aged 30)	Ararat-Armenia	2022		46	21
18	José Caraballo	(Venezuela)	FW	21 February 1996 (aged 27)	Unattached	2022		75	17
37	Vrezh Chiloyan	(Armenia)	FW	6 April 2002 (aged 21)	Academy	2022		1	0
68	Narek Baroyan	(Armenia)	FW	5 May 2005 (aged 18)	Academy	2022		1	0
89	Aris Karapetyan	(Armenia)	FW	24 May 2005 (aged 18)	Academy	2022		0	0
Players away on loan
19	Grenik Petrosyan	(Armenia)	FW	5 December 2001 (aged 21)	Academy	2018		21	0
Players who left during the season
1	David Yurchenko	(Armenia)	GK	27 March 1986 (aged 37)	Alashkert	2022		35	0
3	Boris Varga	(Serbia)	DF	14 August 1993 (aged 29)	TSC Bačka Topola	2022		7	0
5	Zoran Gajić	(Serbia)	DF	18 May 1990 (aged 33)	Zbrojovka Brno	2021		34	3
8	Andre Mensalao	(Brazil)	MF	21 June 1990 (aged 32)	Shkëndija	2022		16	1
13	Gevorg Najaryan	(Kazakhstan)	MF	6 January 1998 (aged 25)	Unattached	2022		15	0
20	Nemanja Mladenović	(Serbia)	MF	3 March 1993 (aged 30)	Napredak Kruševac	2022		8	0
23	Aras Özbiliz	(Armenia)	MF	9 March 1990 (aged 33)	Beşiktaş	2019		31	7
24	Marjan Radeski	(North Macedonia)	FW	10 February 1995 (aged 28)	Shkupi	2022		11	0
26	Renzo Zambrano	(Venezuela)	MF	26 August 1994 (aged 28)	Unattached	2022		28	1
28	Robert Hehedosh	(Ukraine)	FW	2 May 1993 (aged 30)	on loan from Peremoha Dnipro	2022		6	0
30	Alexander González	(Venezuela)	DF	13 September 1992 (aged 30)	Unattached	2022		33	0
70	Uroš Nenadović	(Serbia)	FW	28 January 1994 (aged 29)	Taraz	2022		23	3
77	Dame Diop	(Senegal)	FW	15 February 1993 (aged 30)	Unattached	2022		19	1
87	Aleksandr Karapetyan	(Armenia)	FW	23 December 1987 (aged 35)	Alashkert	2022		12	0
	Milad Jahani	(Iran)	MF	26 March 1989 (aged 34)	on loan from Sepahan	2022		0	0

== Transfers ==
=== In ===
Date	Position	Nationality	Name	From	Fee	Ref.
11 June 2022	FW	(Nigeria)	Yusuf Otubanjo	Ararat-Armenia	Undisclosed	
3 July 2022	DF	(Armenia)	Arthur Avagyan	Noravank	Undisclosed	
3 July 2022	DF	(Serbia)	Boris Varga	FK Bačka Topola	Undisclosed	
3 July 2022	MF	(Brazil)	Andre Mensalao	Shkëndija	Undisclosed	
3 July 2022	DF	(Russia)	Mikhail Kovalenko	Olimp-Dolgoprudny	Undisclosed	
3 July 2022	MF	(Serbia)	Nemanja Mladenović	Napredak Kruševac	Undisclosed	
3 July 2022	DF	(Ukraine)	Serhiy Vakulenko	Ararat-Armenia	Undisclosed	
3 July 2022	FW	(North Macedonia)	Marjan Radeski	Shkupi	Undisclosed	
3 July 2022	FW	(Bosnia and Herzegovina)	Luka Juričić	Gimpo	Undisclosed	
13 August 2022	DF	(Serbia)	Aleksandar Miljković	Partizan	Undisclosed	
21 August 2022	MF	(Ukraine)	Roman Karasyuk	Rukh Lviv	Undisclosed	
2 September 2022	MF	(North Macedonia)	Stefan Spirovski	MTK Budapest	Undisclosed	
2 September 2022	FW	(Armenia)	Grenik Petrosyan	BKMA Yerevan	Undisclosed	
2 September 2022	FW	(Armenia)	Aleksandr Karapetyan	Alashkert	Undisclosed	
7 September 2022	FW	(Senegal)	Dame Diop	Unattached	Free	
13 September 2022	DF	(North Macedonia)	Kire Ristevski	Unattached	Free	
1 October 2022	FW	(Venezuela)	José Caraballo	Unattached	Free	
28 December 2022	GK	(Armenia)	Henri Avagyan	BKMA Yerevan	Undisclosed	
11 January 2023	FW	(Haiti)	Jonel Désiré	Unattached	Free	
12 January 2023	MF	(Armenia)	Edgar Malakyan	Unattached	Free	
18 January 2023	DF	(Brazil)	James Santos	Unattached	Free	
7 February 2023	DF	(Colombia)	Juan Bravo	Unattached	Free	
15 February 2023	MF	(Brazil)	Lucas Villela	Unattached	Free	

=== Loans in ===
Date from	Position	Nationality	Name	From	Date to	Ref.
12 June 2022	MF	(Iran)	Milad Jahani	Sepahan	Undisclosed	
3 July 2022	MF	(Armenia)	David Davidyan	Khimki	Undisclosed	
19 July 2022	DF	(Ukraine)	Alan Aussi	Dynamo Kyiv	Undisclosed	
21 August 2022	FW	(Ukraine)	Robert Hehedosh	Peremoha Dnipro	28 December 2022	

=== Loans out ===
Date	Position	Nationality	Name	To	Date to	Ref.
13 January 2023	FW	(Armenia)	Grenik Petrosyan	BKMA Yerevan	30 June 2023	

=== Released ===
Date	Position	Nationality	Name	Joined	Date	Ref
24 December 2022	GK	(Armenia)	David Yurchenko			
25 December 2022	DF	(Serbia)	Zoran Gajić	Kolubara	16 January 2023	
27 December 2022	DF	(Venezuela)	Alexander González	Caracas	9 February 2023	
27 December 2022	MF	(Venezuela)	Renzo Zambrano	Phoenix Rising	1 January 2023	
27 December 2022	FW	(Serbia)	Uroš Nenadović	Alashkert	21 January 2023	
29 December 2022	DF	(Serbia)	Boris Varga	Radnički Niš	1 January 2023	
29 December 2022	MF	(Armenia)	Aras Özbiliz	Urartu	17 January 2023	
29 December 2022	MF	(Serbia)	Nemanja Mladenović	Rad	27 January 2023	
29 December 2022	FW	(Armenia)	Aleksandr Karapetyan	Cilicia		
29 December 2022	FW	(North Macedonia)	Marjan Radeski	Struga	16 January 2023	
17 January 2023	MF	(Brazil)	Andre Mensalao	Ethnikos Achna		
17 January 2023	FW	(Senegal)	Dame Diop			

== Friendlies ==
21 January 2023	Pyunik (Armenia)	1–3	(Ukraine) Dnipro-1	Belek, Turkey
13:00 (UTC+4)	Caraballo 79'	Report	Dovbyk 34', 87'; Nazarenko 63'

24 January 2023	Pyunik (Armenia)	4–2	(Russia) SKA-Khabarovsk	Belek, Turkey
18:00 (UTC+4)	Désiré 2'; Kovalenko 27'; James 45'; Juričić 56'	Report	Zhamaletdinov 39'; Geloyan 78' (pen.)

28 January 2023	Pyunik (Armenia)	0–2	(Russia) Khimki	Belek, Turkey
18:00 (UTC+4)		Report

4 February 2023	Pyunik (Armenia)	4–0	(Kazakhstan) Maktaaral	Belek, Turkey
13:00 (UTC+4)		Report

4 February 2023	Pyunik (Armenia)	0–1	(Ukraine) Veres Rivne	Belek, Turkey
19:00 (UTC+4)		Report

9 February 2023	Pyunik (Armenia)	0–2	(Russia) Baltika Kaliningrad	Belek, Turkey
17:00 (UTC+4)		Report	Tishkin 123'; Borisenko 134'
Note: Match played as 3x45 minutes.

13 February 2023	Pyunik (Armenia)	1–0	(Ukraine) Oleksandriya	Belek, Turkey
13:00 (UTC+4)	Dashyan 12'	Report

13 February 2023	Pyunik (Armenia)	1–0	(Russia) Orenburg	Belek, Turkey
19:00 (UTC+4)	Caraballo 8'	Report

18 February 2023	Pyunik	2–2	West Armenia	Yerevan
14:00 (UTC+4)	Désiré; Harutyunyan	Report	Goal	Stadium: Pyunik Training Ground

19 February 2023	Pyunik	3–1	Noah	Yerevan
14:00 (UTC+4)	Goal	Report	Goal	Stadium: Pyunik Training Ground

== Competitions ==
=== Overall record ===
Competition	First match	Last match	Starting round	Final position	Record							
Competition	First match	Last match	Starting round	Final position	Pld	W	D	L	GF	GA	GD	Win %
Premier League	30 July 2022	6 June 2023	Matchday 1	2nd	36	25	5	6	72	23	+49	69.44
Armenian Cup	26 November 2022	5 April 2023	Quarterfinal	Semifinal	2	1	1	0	4	1	+3	50.00
UEFA Champions League	5 July 2022	9 August 2022	First qualifying round	Third qualifying round	6	1	2	3	6	11	−5	16.67
UEFA Europa League	18 August 2022	25 August 2022	Playoff Round	Playoff Round	2	0	2	0	0	0	+0	0.00
UEFA Europa Conference League	8 September 2022	3 November 2022	Group Stage	Group Stage	6	2	0	4	8	9	−1	33.33
Total					52	29	10	13	90	44	+46	55.77

Last updated: 6 June 2023
Source: Competitions

=== Supercup ===
24 September 2022	Pyunik	v	Noravank	Yerevan
(UTC+4)		Report		Stadium: Republican Stadium
Note: Match did not take place due to the bankruptcy of Noravank, and scheduling complications due to Pyunik's progression in European competitions. Pyunik awarded and received the Super Cup trophy in February 2023.

=== Premier League ===
==== Results summary ====
Overall								Home						Away					
Pld	W	D	L	GF	GA	GD	Pts	W	D	L	GF	GA	GD	W	D	L	GF	GA	GD
36	25	5	6	72	23	+49	80	14	0	4	37	11	+26	11	5	2	35	12	+23

Last updated: 6 June 2023.
Source: See Results

==== Results by round ====
Round	1	2	3	4	5	6	7	8	9	10	11	12	13	14	15	16	17	18	19	20	21	22	23	24	25	26	27	28	29	30	31	32	33	34	35	36
Ground	H	h (Note: matchday 3)	H (Note: matchday 4)	H (Note: matchday 5)	H (Note: matchday 6)	H (Note: matchday 7)	A (Note: matchday 8)	H (Note: matchday 9)	A (Note: matchday 10)	H (Note: matchday 11)	A (Note: matchday 12)	A (Note: matchday 14)	A (Note: matchday 15)	A (Note: matchday 2)	A (Note: matchday 16)	A (Note: matchday 18)	H (Note: matchday 19)	A (Note: matchday 20)	H (Note: matchday 21)	A (Note: matchday 13)	H	A	H	A	H	A	H	A	H	A	H	A	H	A	H	A
Result	L	W	L	W	W	W	L	W	L	W	W	W	D	D	D	W	W	D	L	W	W	W	W	W	W	W	W	W	W	W	W	W	W	D	L	W
Position	7	6	8	7	6	4	5	4	4	4	4	4	4	4	4	4	4	3	3	3	3	3	3	3	3	3	3	3	2	2	2	2	2	2	2	2

Updated to match(es) played on 6 June 2023. Source: See Results
A = Away; H = Home; W = Win; D = Draw; L = Loss; P = Postponed; V = Void

==== Results ====
30 July 2022 1	Pyunik	0–1	Ararat Yerevan	Yerevan
20:00 (UTC+4)	González (yellow card) 23'; Nenadović (yellow card) 57'; Dashyan (yellow card) 74'; A.Avagyan (yellow card) 90+2'	Report	R.Hakobyan 71'; Potapov (yellow card) 88'; Manoyan (yellow card) 89'	Stadium: Republican Stadium; Referee: Zaven Hovhannisyan

13 August 2022 3	Pyunik	1–0	Shirak	Yerevan
18:00 (UTC+4)	Aussi (yellow card) 29'; Vakulenko (yellow card) 39'; Miljković (yellow card) 50'; A.Avagyan (yellow card) 57'; Dashyan 60'	Report	Bakayoko (yellow card) 77'; Vidić (yellow card) 90+2'; D.Kodia (yellow card) 90+5'	Stadium: Republican Stadium; Referee: Vardan Manukyan

21 August 2022 4	Pyunik	0–1	Van	Yerevan
20:00 (UTC+4)	A.Mensalao (yellow card) 52'	Report	H.Asoyan (yellow card) 17'; Gvazava (yellow card) 41'; A.Tatayev (yellow card) 60'; Harutyunyan (yellow card) 63'; Gorelov 83'	Stadium: Republican Stadium; Referee: Henrik Nalbandian

29 August 2022 5	Pyunik	3–0	Noah	Yerevan
20:00 (UTC+4)	A.Mensalao 27'; Kovalenko 81'; Otubanjo 90'	Report	P.Afajanyan (yellow card) 43'; A.Khachatryan (yellow card) 60'	Stadium: Republican Stadium; Referee: Sargis Khachatryan

3 September 2022 6	Pyunik	1–0	Lernayin Artsakh	Yerevan
17:00 (UTC+4)	Juričić 29'	Report	A.Khachatryan (yellow card) 50'; M.Angulo (yellow card) 80'; J.Palacios (yellow card) 90+4'	Stadium: Alashkert Stadium; Referee: Ashot Ghaltakhchyan

12 September 2022 7	Pyunik	3–1	BKMA Yerevan	Yerevan
17:00 (UTC+4)	Gareginyan (yellow card) 18'; Diop 29'; A.Mensalao (yellow card) 60'; Özbiliz 66'; Zambrano 90'	Report	A.Jindoyan (yellow card) 37'; Grigoryan 60'	Stadium: FFA Stadium; Referee: Vardan Vardumyan

19 September 2022 8	Urartu	2–1	Pyunik	Yerevan
20:00 (UTC+4)	A.Ghazaryan (yellow card) 24'; Kovalenko 54' (o.g.); N.Grigoryan 76'; Melikhov (yellow card) 88'	Report	Otubanjo 66'	Stadium: Urartu Stadium; Referee: Zaven Hovhannisyan

1 October 2022 9	Pyunik	5–1	Alashkert	Yerevan
17:00 (UTC+4)	Otubanjo 12'; Miljković (yellow card) 21'; Harutyunyan 40'; Juričić 51'; Yurchenko (yellow card) 73'; Davidyan (yellow card) 74'; González 79', 82'	Report	Čančarević (yellow card) 39'; Díaz 65'; A.Voskanyan (yellow card) 74'	Stadium: Republican Stadium; Referee: Henrik Nalbandian

9 October 2022 10	Ararat Yerevan	1–0	Pyunik	Yerevan
18:00 (UTC+4)	R.Mkrtchyan 9'; G.Malakyan (yellow card) 45+1'; Potapov (yellow card) 90+1'	Report	Baranov (yellow card) 46'; Ristevski (yellow card) 90+6'	Stadium: Republican Stadium; Referee: Aertem Gasparyan

17 October 2022 11	Pyunik	2–1	Ararat-Armenia	Yerevan
19:00 (UTC+4)	Otubanjo 9' (yellow card) 26'; Harutyunyan 61'; González (yellow card) 81'	Report	Eza 29'; Avanesyan (yellow card) 50'; Bueno (yellow card) 90+1'	Stadium: Republican Stadium; Referee: Zaven Hovhannisyan

21 October 2022 12	Shirak	0–1	Pyunik	Gyumri
19:00 (UTC+4)	R.Misakyan (yellow card) 33'; Mikaelyan (yellow card) 72'; Prljević (yellow card) 80'; Vardanyan (yellow card) 80'; L.Darbinyan (yellow card) 85'	Report	Davidyan 66' (yellow card) 90+3'; Juninho (yellow card) 87'; Buchnev (yellow card) 90+2'	Stadium: Gyumri City Stadium; Referee: Henrik Nalbandian

31 October 2022 14	Noah	0–1	Pyunik	Armavir
15:00 (UTC+4)	R.Yesayan (yellow card) 56'	Report	Caraballo 73'; Kovalenko (yellow card) 79'	Stadium: Armavir City Stadium; Referee: Ashot Ghaltakhchyan

6 November 2022 15	Lernayin Artsakh	1–1	Pyunik	Vayk
15:00 (UTC+4)	V.Bilunga 16'; K.Sow (yellow card) 67'; S.Obonde (yellow card) 74'; V.Grigoryan (yellow card) 87'	Report	Davidyan (yellow card) 45+3'; Juričić (yellow card) 58' (goal) 69'; Otubanjo (yellow card) 71'	Stadium: Arevik Stadium; Referee: Artem Gasparyan

10 November 2022 2	Ararat-Armenia	0–0	Pyunik	Yerevan
17:00 (UTC+4)	Romércio (yellow card) 40'; J.Duarte (yellow card) 57'; Firmino (yellow card) 60'; Ghazaryan (yellow card) 90+4'	Report	Baranov (yellow card) 65'; Harutyunyan (yellow card) 71'; Kovalenko (yellow card) 71'; Bratkov (yellow card) 90+3'	Stadium: FFA Stadium; Referee: Henrik Nalbandian

13 November 2022 16	BKMA Yerevan	1–1	Pyunik	Yerevan
17:00 (UTC+4)	A.Serobyan 20'; N.Alaverdyan (yellow card) 34' (red card) 34'	Report	Spirovski (yellow card) 32'; Juričić 47'	Stadium: FFA Stadium; Referee: Vardan Manukyan

22 November 2022 18	Alashkert	1–2	Pyunik	Yerevan
14:00 (UTC+4)	Galvão (yellow card) 73'; Reyes 86'	Report	Juričić (yellow card) 12' (goal) 43'; Bratkov (yellow card) 74'; Kadio 90+3'	Stadium: Alashkert Stadium; Referee: Zaven Hovhannisyan

30 November 2022 19	Pyunik	2–0	Ararat Yerevan	Yerevan
17:00 (UTC+4)	Juričić 45'; Harutyunyan 71'; Bratkov (yellow card) 89'	Report	Aliyu (yellow card) 40'; S.Galstyan (yellow card) 60'; J.Bravo (yellow card) 89'; Ishkhanyan (yellow card) 90+5'	Stadium: Republican Stadium; Referee: Zaven Hovhannisyan

5 December 2022 20	Ararat-Armenia	1–1	Pyunik	Yerevan
19:00 (UTC+4)	Eza 83'; Bueno (yellow card) 84'; Firmino (yellow card) 90'	Report	Juričić 21'; Dashyan (yellow card) 31'; Miljković (yellow card) 56'; Harutyunyan (yellow card) 64'; Buchnev (yellow card) 81'	Stadium: FFA Stadium; Referee: Artem Gasparyan

9 December 2022 17	Pyunik	0–3	Urartu	Yerevan
18:00 (UTC+4)	Baranov (yellow card) 5'; Miljković (red card) 32'; Harutyunyan (yellow card) 72'	Report	Polyakov (yellow card) 12'; N.Aghasaryan (yellow card) 48'; U.Iwu (yellow card) 51' (goal) 84'; Marcos Júnior 63'; A.Ghazaryan (yellow card) 70'; Khlyobas 90'	Stadium: Republican Stadium; Referee: Henrik Nalbandian

24 February 2023 13	Van	0–3	Pyunik	Charentsavan
15:00 (UTC+4)	Hovsepyan (yellow card) 29'; Williams (yellow card) 74'	Report	Otubanjo 14'; Caraballo 23', 79'; Gareginyan (yellow card) 90+7'	Stadium: Charentsavan City Stadium; Referee: Henrik Nalbandian
Note: Match originally scheduled for 24 October, but postponed on 19 October.

1 March 2023 21	Pyunik	4–1	Shirak	Yerevan
15:00 (UTC+4)	Otubanjo 11', 40'; Désiré 17'; Caraballo 40'; Baranov (yellow card) 45'; Kovalenko (yellow card) 56'	Report	Mryan 90'	Stadium: Republican Stadium; Referee: Yura Mahtesyan

5 March 2023 22	Van	1–3	Pyunik	Charentsavan
14:00 (UTC+4)	Hovhannisyan (yellow card) 29'; Gaba 49'; Hovsepyan (yellow card) 54'; Kartashyan (yellow card) 58' (red card) 58'; Gorelov (yellow card) 75'	Report	Malakyan (yellow card) 75'; Juričić 81', 90+3'; Otubanjo 83'	Stadium: Charentsavan City Stadium; Referee: Ashot Ghaltakhchyan

11 March 2023 23	Pyunik	2–0	Noah	Yerevan
15:00 (UTC+4)	Miljković (yellow card) 23'; Harutyunyan (yellow card) 39'; Malakyan 43'; Juričić 72'	Report	Igbokwe (yellow card) 42'	Stadium: Republican Stadium; Referee: Artem Gasparyan

16 March 2023 24	Lernayin Artsakh	0–6	Pyunik	Vayk
15:00 (UTC+4)	Sow (yellow card) 30'; Kagawa (yellow card) 45'	Report	Malakyan 10' (pen.); Harutyunyan 32' (pen.) (yellow card) 63'; Désiré 38'; Otubanjo 65'; Dashyan 70'; Miljković (yellow card) 76'; Kovalenko 84'	Stadium: Arevik Stadium; Referee: Zaven Hovhannisyan

1 April 2023 25	Pyunik	3–0	BKMA Yerevan	Yerevan
16:00 (UTC+4)	Dashyan 17'; Otubanjo 43', 55'; Kovalenko (yellow card) 61'	Report	Petrosyan (yellow card) 45+1'	Stadium: Republican Stadium; Referee: Zaven Hovhannisyan

11 April 2023 26	Urartu	1–3	Pyunik	Yerevan
19:00 (UTC+4)	Ghazaryan 5' (pen.); Tsymbalyuk (yellow card) 39'; Zotko (yellow card) 56'	Report	Miljković 39'; Otubanjo 45+5'; Dashyan (yellow card) 49'; Désiré (yellow card) 51'; Juričić 66'; Caraballo (yellow card) 75'; Buchnev (yellow card) 90+7'	Stadium: Urartu Stadium; Referee: Artem Gasparyan

17 April 2023 27	Pyunik	1–0	Alashkert	Yerevan
19:00 (UTC+4)	Juninho (yellow card) 39'; Villela 62'; Miljković (yellow card) 66'; Davidyan (yellow card) 90+1'	Report	Mužek (yellow card) 25'; Nalbandyan (yellow card) 33'; Galvão (yellow card) 90+5'	Stadium: Republican Stadium; Referee: Henrik Nalbandian

22 April 2023 28	Ararat Yerevan	0–2	Pyunik	Yerevan
15:00 (UTC+4)	Babaliev (yellow card) 41'; Hakobyan (yellow card) 90'; Faye (yellow card) 90+2'	Report	Juričić 5'; Miljković (yellow card) 52'; James 90+6'	Stadium: Republican Stadium; Referee: Yura Mahtesyan

27 April 2023 29	Pyunik	4-1	Ararat-Armenia	Yerevan
20:00 (UTC+4)	Harutyunyan (yellow card) 25'; Malakyan (yellow card) 39'; Juričić 62', 90+4', 90+6' (yellow card) 88'; Dashyan 73'; Bravo (yellow card) 90+1'	Report	Tera (yellow card) 18'; Muradyan (yellow card) 33'; Serobyan 42' (pen.); Ermakov (yellow card) 88'; Terteryan (yellow card) 88'	Stadium: Republican Stadium; Referee: Artem Gasparyan

2 May 2023 30	Shirak	0-4	Pyunik	Gyumri
20:00 (UTC+4)	Misakyan (red card) 44'; Vardanyan (yellow card) 78'	Report	Juričić 45+2' (pen.); Otubanjo 61'; James 62'; Désiré (yellow card) 67'; Spirovski 90+2'	Stadium: Gyumri City Stadium; Referee: Vardan Manukyan

7 May 2023 31	Pyunik	4-0	Van	Yerevan
19:00 (UTC+4)	Otubanjo 25'; Malakyan 34'; Miljković 53'; Harutyunyan 58'	Report	Asoyan (yellow card) 38'; Gaba (yellow card) 52'; Movsesyan (yellow card) 87'	Stadium: Republican Stadium; Referee: Sargis Khachatryan

15 May 2023 32	Noah	1–3	Pyunik	Abovyan
19:00 (UTC+4)	Ayrapetyan (yellow card) 27'; Melkonyan (yellow card) 41'; Igbokwe 60' (yellow card) 83'; Olawale (yellow card) 81'; Danielyan (yellow card) 87'	Report	Désiré 22'; Malakyan (yellow card) 27' (goal) 43' (pen.); Caraballo (yellow card) 46'; Dashyan (yellow card) 48'; Gareginyan (yellow card) 58'; Otubanjo 72'; Juričić (yellow card) 85'; Davidyan (yellow card) 88'	Stadium: Abovyan City Stadium; Referee: Henrik Nalbandian

21 May 2023 33	Pyunik	2–0	Lernayin Artsakh	Yerevan
16:45 (UTC+4)	Otubanjo 34'; Dashyan (yellow card) 38'; Juričić (yellow card) 59'; Villela (yellow card) 65'; Buchnev (yellow card) 85'; Désiré 90+3' (yellow card) 90+3'	Report	Simonyan (yellow card) 29'	Stadium: Republican Stadium; Referee: Ashot Ghaltakhchyan

26 May 2023 34	BKMA Yerevan	1–1	Pyunik	Yerevan
20:00 (UTC+4)	Tarakhchyan 88'; Aghbalyan (yellow card) 90+12'	Report	Karasyuk (yellow card) 50'; Bravo 90+5'	Stadium: FFA Stadium; Referee: Artem Gasparyan

2 June 2023 35	Pyunik	0–1	Urartu	Yerevan
20:00 (UTC+4)	Davidyan (yellow card) 65'; Bratkov (yellow card) 88'; Miljković (yellow card) 90+5'; Juričić (yellow card) 90+5'	Report	Antwi (yellow card) 20'; Khurtsidze (yellow card) 55'; Salou (yellow card) 71'; Piloyan (yellow card) 77'; Melikhov (yellow card) 90+1'; Tsymbalyuk 90+3'; Ghazaryan (yellow card) 90+5'	Stadium: Republican Stadium; Referee: Henrik Nalbandian

6 June 2023 36	Alashkert	1–2	Pyunik	Yerevan
17:00 (UTC+4)	Yedigaryan 13'; Ustinov (yellow card) 71'; T.Voskanyan (yellow card) 75'; Shahinyan (yellow card) 81'	Report	Otubanjo 36'; Juričić 76' (pen.); Villela (yellow card) 84'	Stadium: Alashkert Stadium; Referee: Yura Mahtesyan

==== Table ====
Pos	Team	Pld	W	D	L	GF	GA	GD	Pts	Qualification or relegation
1	Urartu (C)	36	26	5	5	68	25	+43	83	Qualification for the Champions League first qualifying round
2	Pyunik	36	25	5	6	72	23	+49	80	Qualification for the Europa Conference League first qualifying round (Note: The 2022–23 Armenian Cup winners qualified for the Europa Conference League first qualifying round. Since the cup winners (Urartu) qualified based on league position, the Europa Conference League spot was passed to the fourth-placed team.)
3	Ararat-Armenia	36	23	7	6	70	27	+43	76	Qualification for the Europa Conference League first qualifying round
4	Alashkert	36	20	6	10	58	37	+21	66	Qualification for the Europa Conference League first qualifying round
5	Van	36	11	7	18	38	59	−21	40	
6	Ararat Yerevan	36	10	8	18	29	42	−13	38	
7	Shirak	36	10	6	20	25	55	−30	36	
8	Noah	36	8	8	20	34	66	−32	32 (Note: Games won: Noah 8, BKMA 7.)	
9	BKMA	36	7	11	18	36	53	−17	32	
10	Lernayin Artsakh (R)	36	5	7	24	16	59	−43	22	Relegation to the Armenian First League

Source: FFA Soccerway
Rules for classification: 1) Points; 2) Head-to-head points; 3) Head-to-head goal difference; 4) Head-to-head goals scored; 5) Matches won; 6) Goal difference; 7) Less red cards; 8) Less yellow cards; 9) Fair-play ranking 10) Draw
(C) Champions; (R) Relegated

=== Armenian Cup ===
26 November 2022 Quarterfinal	Pyunik	3–0	Noah	Yerevan
19:00 (UTC+4)	Otubanjo 17'; Gareginyan (yellow card) 70'; Ristevski (yellow card) 88'; Juričić 89', 90+4'; Buchnev (yellow card) 90+1'	Report	Friday (yellow card) 30'; Salou (yellow card) 71'; Igbokwe (yellow card) 76'; Danielyan (yellow card) 79'	Stadium: Republican Stadium; Referee: Sargis Khachatryan

5 April 2023 Semifinal	Shirak	1–1 (a.e.t.) (5 – 3 p)	Pyunik	Gyumri
19:00 (UTC+4)	Kodia 17'; Darbinyan (yellow card) 33'; Mryan (yellow card) 54'; Achinov (yellow card) 80'; Vidić (yellow card) 96'	Report	Miljković (yellow card) 77'; Harutyunyan (yellow card) 79'; Baranov (yellow card) 90'; Juninho 90+11'	Stadium: Gyumri City Stadium; Referee: Henrik Nalbandian
	Penalties
	Vardanyan (penalty scored); Prljević (penalty scored); Bakayoko (penalty scored); Traore (penalty scored); Darbinyan (penalty scored)		(penalty missed) Gareginyan; (penalty scored) Malakyan; (penalty scored) Désiré; (penalty scored) Dashyan

=== UEFA Champions League ===
==== Qualifying rounds ====
5 July 2022 First qualifying round 1st leg	Pyunik (Armenia)	0–0	(Romania) CFR Cluj	Yerevan, Armenia
20:00 (UTC+4)	Vakulenko (yellow card) 62'; Mladenović (yellow card) 83'; Zambrano (yellow card) 87'	Report	Adjei-Boateng (yellow card) 67'	Stadium: Republican Stadium; Attendance: 8,000; Referee: Bastian Dankert (Germany)

13 July 2022 First qualifying round 2nd leg	CFR Cluj (Romania)	2–2 (a.e.t.) (2–2 agg.) (3–4 p)	(Armenia) Pyunik	Cluj, Romania
22:30 (UTC+4)	Adjei-Boateng 6' (yellow card) 61'; Petrila 94'	Report	Kovalenko (yellow card) 20'; Cociuc (yellow card) 48'; Otubanjo (yellow card) 54'; Gajić 89', 119'	Stadium: Stadionul Dr. Constantin Rădulescu; Attendance: 7,017; Referee: Michael Fabbri (Italy)
	Penalties
	Dugandžić (penalty scored); Petrila (penalty missed); Burcă (penalty scored); Muhar (penalty scored); Camora (penalty missed)		(penalty scored) Cociuc; (penalty scored) Dashyan; (penalty scored) Harutyunyan; (penalty scored) Avagyan

19 July 2022 Second qualifying round 1st leg	Pyunik (Armenia)	0–1	(Luxembourg) F91 Dudelange	Yerevan, Armenia
20:00 (UTC+4)	Juričić (yellow card) 32'; Gajić 72'	Report	Diouf (yellow card) 39'; Hadji 72' (pen.); C.Stumpf (yellow card) 88'	Stadium: Republican Stadium; Attendance: 9,000; Referee: Craig Pawson (England)

26 July 2022 Second qualifying round 2nd leg	F91 Dudelange (Luxembourg)	1–4 (2–4 agg.)	(Armenia) Pyunik	Dudelange, Luxembourg
21:30 (UTC+4)	Hassan 21'; Hadji (yellow card) 31'	Report	Juninho 24'; Gajić (yellow card) 48'; Juričić 54', 85'; Dashyan (yellow card) 68'; Otubanjo 76'	Stadium: Stade Jos Nosbaum; Attendance: 1,495; Referee: José Luis Munuera (Spain)

3 August 2022 Third qualifying round 1st leg	Red Star Belgrade (Serbia)	5–0	(Armenia) Pyunik	Belgrade, Serbia
22:45 (UTC+4)	Katai (yellow card) 25'; Bukari 29', 44', 70'; Kangwa 33'; Dragović (yellow card) 39'; Mitrović 77'; Rodić (yellow card) 89' (yellow-red card) 90'		González (yellow card) 80'; Kovalenko (yellow card) 90+2'	Stadium: Red Star Stadium; Attendance: 40,456; Referee: Artur Soares Dias (Portugal)

9 August 2022 Third qualifying round 2nd leg	Pyunik (Armenia)	0–2 (0–7 agg.)	(Serbia) Red Star Belgrade	Yerevan, Armenia
21:00 (UTC+4)	Juninho (yellow card) 28'; A.Avagyan (yellow card) 43'	Report	Katai (penalty missed) 30'; Eraković (yellow card) 33'; Kanga 44' (pen.); Pavkov 60'; Dragović (yellow card) 79'; Mustapha (yellow card) 81'	Stadium: Republican Stadium; Attendance: 6,000; Referee: Willie Collum (Scotland)

=== UEFA Europa League ===
==== Qualifying rounds ====
18 August 2022 Playoff Round 1st leg	Pyunik (Armenia)	0–0	(Moldova) Sheriff Tiraspol	Yerevan, Armenia
21:00 (UTC+4)	Bratkov (yellow card) 51'	Report	Guedes (yellow card) 31'	Stadium: Republican Stadium; Attendance: 9,000; Referee: Alejandro Hernández Hernández (Spain)

25 August 2022 Playoff Round 2nd leg	Sheriff Tiraspol (Moldova)	0–0 (0–0 agg.) (3–2 p)	(Armenia) Pyunik	Chișinău, Moldova
21:00 (UTC+4)	Ouattara (yellow card) 55'; Botos (yellow card) 96'; Diop (yellow card) 119'	Report	Vakulenko (yellow card) 85'; Gareginyan (yellow card) 95'	Stadium: Zimbru Stadium; Attendance: 6,154; Referee: Andreas Ekberg (Sweden)
	Penalties
	Tejan (penalty scored); Ambri (penalty missed); Diop (penalty missed); Kpozo (penalty scored); Kiki (penalty missed); Radeljić (penalty scored)		(penalty missed) Harutyunyan; (penalty missed) Dashyan; (penalty missed) Zambrano; (penalty scored) Gareginyan; (penalty scored) Vakulenko; (penalty missed) Kovalenko
Note: Sheriff Tiraspol played their home match at the Zimbru Stadium in Chișinău, instead of their regular stadium, the Sheriff Stadium, in Tiraspol, due to Transnistria's involvement in the Russian invasion of Ukraine.

=== UEFA Europa Conference League ===
==== Qualifying rounds ====
Pos	Team	Pld	W	D	L	GF	GA	GD	Pts	Qualification
1	(Slovakia) Slovan Bratislava	6	3	2	1	9	7	+2	11 (Note: Head-to-head points: Slovan Bratislava 4, Basel 1.)	Advance to round of 16
2	(Switzerland) Basel	6	3	2	1	11	9	+2	11	Advance to knockout round play-offs
3	(Armenia) Pyunik	6	2	0	4	8	9	−1	6	
4	(Lithuania) Žalgiris	6	1	2	3	5	8	−3	5	

Source: UEFA
Rules for classification: Group stage tiebreakers
Notes:

8 September 2022 1	Basel (Switzerland)	3–1	(Armenia) Pyunik	Basel, Switzerland
23:00 (UTC+4)	Males 23' (pen.); Kasim (yellow card) 51'; Burger 54', 76'	Report	Bratkov (yellow card) 13'; Miljković (yellow card) 22'; Dashyan 27'; Harutyunyan (yellow card) 55'	Stadium: St. Jakob-Park; Attendance: 11,860; Referee: Juan Martínez Munuera (Spain)

15 September 2022 2	Pyunik (Armenia)	2–0	(Slovakia) Slovan Bratislava	Yerevan, Armenia
20:45 (UTC+4)	Dashyan 35'; Otubanjo 36'; Kovalenko (yellow card) 38'; Miljković (yellow card) 45+1'; Karapetyan (yellow card) 64'	Report	Barseghyan (yellow card) 25'; Šaponjić (yellow card) 82'	Stadium: Republican Stadium; Attendance: 3,500; Referee: Gal Laibuvitz (Israel)

6 October 2022 3	Pyunik (Armenia)	2–0	(Lithuania) Žalgiris	Yerevan, Armenia
20:45 (UTC+4)	Juninho 43'; Otubanjo 61'; Miljković (yellow card) 78'; Cociuc (yellow card) 81'	Report	Gorobsov (yellow card) 68'	Stadium: Republican Stadium; Attendance: 5,304; Referee: John Beaton (Scotland)

13 October 2022 4	Žalgiris (Lithuania)	2–1	(Armenia) Pyunik	Vilnius, Lithuania
23:00 (UTC+4)	Ourega 23'; Oliveira 42'; Ourega (yellow card) 44'; Ljubisavljević (yellow card) 77'; Mamić (yellow card) 90+6'	Report	Vakulenko (yellow card) 74'; Özbiliz 78' (pen.)	Stadium: LFF Stadium; Attendance: 3,025; Referee: Juxhin Xhaja (Albania)

27 October 2022 5	Slovan Bratislava (Slovakia)	2–1	(Armenia) Pyunik	Bratislava, Slovakia
23:00 (UTC+4)	Chovan (yellow card) 63'; Kashia 84'; Ramírez 85' (yellow card) 86'; Zmrhal (yellow card) 90+6'	Report	Bratkov (yellow card) 24'; Cociuc 64' (pen.); Yurchenko (yellow card) 75'; Juričić (yellow card) 80'	Stadium: Tehelné pole Attendance: 15,783; Referee: Manuel Schüttengruber (Austria)

3 November 2022 6	Pyunik (Armenia)	1–2	(Switzerland) Basel	Yerevan, Armenia
21:45 (UTC+4)	Harutyunyan (yellow card) 56'; Juričić 71'	Report	Ndoye (yellow card) 14' (yellow-red card) 53'; Males 17' (yellow card) 80'; Kade 29'; Calafiori (yellow card) 62'	Stadium: Republican Stadium; Attendance: 9,967; Referee: Horațiu Feșnic (Romania)

== Statistics ==
As of match played 6 June 2023

=== Appearances and goals ===
No.	Pos	Nat	Player	Total		Premier League		Armenian Cup		UEFA Champions League		UEFA Europa League		UEFA Europa Conference League	
No.	Pos	Nat	Player	Apps	Goals	Apps	Goals	Apps	Goals	Apps	Goals	Apps	Goals	Apps	Goals
2	FW	(Bosnia and Herzegovina) BIH	Luka Juričić	41	22	13+15	17	0+1	2	3+2	2	1+1	0	4+1	1
4	DF	(North Macedonia) MKD	Kire Ristevski	14	0	9+3	0	1+1	0	0	0	0	0	0	0
5	DF	(Brazil) BRA	James Santos	13	2	10+3	2	0	0	0	0	0	0	0	0
6	DF	(Brazil) BRA	Juninho	37	3	21+1	0	1	1	6	1	2	0	5+1	1
7	MF	(Armenia) ARM	Edgar Malakyan	14	4	12+1	4	1	0	0	0	0	0	0	0
8	DF	(Colombia) COL	Juan Bravo	7	1	2+5	1	0	0	0	0	0	0	0	0
9	MF	(Armenia) ARM	Artak Dashyan	47	6	24+7	4	2	0	6	0	2	0	6	2
10	MF	(North Macedonia) MKD	Stefan Spirovski	20	1	8+7	1	0+1	0	0	0	0	0	0+4	0
11	MF	(Armenia) ARM	Hovhannes Harutyunyan	44	5	22+7	5	1	0	4+2	0	2	0	6	0
12	FW	(Haiti) HAI	Jonel Désiré	16	4	12+3	4	0+1	0	0	0	0	0	0	0
14	FW	(Nigeria) NGR	Yusuf Otubanjo	46	21	20+10	17	1+1	1	6	1	2	0	6	2
15	DF	(Russia) RUS	Mikhail Kovalenko	43	2	22+7	2	1+1	0	6	0	1+1	0	1+3	0
16	GK	(Armenia) ARM	Henri Avagyan	3	0	2	0	1	0	0	0	0	0	0	0
17	MF	(Ukraine) UKR	Roman Karasyuk	26	0	14+7	0	1	0	0	0	0	0	0+4	0
18	FW	(Venezuela) VEN	José Caraballo	30	6	17+11	6	1+1	0	0	0	0	0	0	0
20	MF	(Brazil) BRA	Lucas Villela	17	1	4+12	1	1	0	0	0	0	0	0	0
21	DF	(Armenia) ARM	Arthur Avagyan	10	0	5+2	0	0+1	0	1+1	0	0	0	0	0
27	DF	(Estonia) EST	Nikita Baranov	18	0	13	0	2	0	0	0	0	0	3	0
29	MF	(Moldova) MDA	Eugeniu Cociuc	23	1	7+2	0	0	0	5+1	0	2	0	6	1
32	GK	(Armenia) ARM	Sergey Mikaelyan	1	0	0+1	0	0	0	0	0	0	0	0	0
37	FW	(Armenia) ARM	Vrezh Chiloyan	1	0	0+1	0	0	0	0	0	0	0	0	0
44	DF	(Ukraine) UKR	Alan Aussi	4	0	3	0	0	0	0+1	0	0	0	0	0
68	FW	(Armenia) ARM	Narek Baroyan	1	0	0+1	0	0	0	0	0	0	0	0	0
71	GK	(Armenia) ARM	Stanislav Buchnev	30	0	28	0	1	0	1	0	0	0	0	0
79	DF	(Ukraine) UKR	Serhiy Vakulenko	13	0	5	0	0	0	2	0	2	0	4	0
83	MF	(Armenia) ARM	Vyacheslav Afyan	1	0	0+1	0	0	0	0	0	0	0	0	0
85	MF	(Armenia) ARM	Karlen Hovhannisyan	2	0	0+2	0	0	0	0	0	0	0	0	0
88	MF	(Armenia) ARM	Yuri Gareginyan	27	0	8+12	0	0+2	0	0+3	0	0+1	0	0+1	0
90	DF	(Serbia) SRB	Aleksandar Miljković	33	2	25+1	2	1	0	0	0	0+1	0	5	0
95	DF	(Ukraine) UKR	Anton Bratkov	29	0	17+2	0	0	0	2	0	2	0	6	0
97	MF	(Armenia) ARM	David Davidyan	31	1	21+3	1	2	0	4+1	0	0	0	0	0
Players away on loan:
19	FW	(Armenia) ARM	Grenik Petrosyan	11	0	1+6	0	1	0	0	0	0	0	0+3	0
Players who left Pyunik during the season:
1	GK	(Armenia) ARM	David Yurchenko	19	0	6	0	0	0	5	0	2	0	6	0
3	DF	(Serbia) SRB	Boris Varga	7	0	5+1	0	0	0	0	0	0+1	0	0	0
5	DF	(Serbia) SRB	Zoran Gajić	9	2	2+1	0	1	0	4	2	1	0	0	0
8	MF	(Brazil) BRA	Andre Mensalao	16	1	6+7	1	1	0	1+1	0	0	0	0	0
13	MF	(Kazakhstan) KAZ	Gevorg Najaryan	9	0	3	0	0	0	0+6	0	0	0	0	0
20	MF	(Serbia) SRB	Nemanja Mladenović	8	0	3	0	0	0	0+5	0	0	0	0	0
23	MF	(Armenia) ARM	Aras Özbiliz	13	2	1+8	1	1	0	0	0	0	0	0+3	1
24	FW	(North Macedonia) MKD	Marjan Radeski	11	0	5+2	0	0	0	0+2	0	1+1	0	0	0
26	MF	(Venezuela) VEN	Renzo Zambrano	12	1	2+3	1	0	0	4+1	0	0+2	0	0	0
28	FW	(Ukraine) UKR	Robert Hehedosh	6	0	3+3	0	0	0	0	0	0	0	0	0
30	DF	(Venezuela) VEN	Alexander González	19	0	4+1	0	0	0	4+2	0	2	0	6	0
70	FW	(Serbia) SRB	Uroš Nenadović	11	0	3+1	0	0	0	2+3	0	0+2	0	0	0
77	FW	(Senegal) SEN	Dame Diop	19	1	4+9	1	0	0	0	0	0	0	1+5	0
87	FW	(Armenia) ARM	Aleksandr Karapetyan	12	0	4+3	0	0	0	0	0	0	0	1+4	0

=== Goal scorers ===
Place	Position	Nation	Number	Name	Premier League	Armenian Cup	UEFA Champions League	UEFA Europa League	UEFA Europa Conference League	Total
1	FW	(Bosnia and Herzegovina)	2	Luka Juričić	17	2	2	0	1	22
2	FW	(Nigeria)	14	Yusuf Otubanjo	17	1	1	0	2	21
3	FW	(Venezuela)	18	José Caraballo	6	0	0	0	0	6
3	MF	(Armenia)	9	Artak Dashyan	4	0	0	0	2	6
5	MF	(Armenia)	11	Hovhannes Harutyunyan	5	0	0	0	0	5
6	MF	(Armenia)	7	Edgar Malakyan	4	0	0	0	0	4
6	FW	(Haiti)	12	Jonel Désiré	4	0	0	0	0	4
8	DF	(Brazil)	6	Juninho	0	1	1	0	1	3
9	DF	(Russia)	15	Mikhail Kovalenko	2	0	0	0	0	2
9	DF	(Brazil)	5	James Santos	2	0	0	0	0	2
9	DF	(Serbia)	90	Aleksandar Miljković	2	0	0	0	0	2
9	MF	(Serbia)	5	Zoran Gajić	0	0	2	0	0	2
9	MF	(Armenia)	23	Aras Özbiliz	1	0	0	0	1	2
14	MF	(Brazil)	8	Andre Mensalao	1	0	0	0	0	1
14	MF	(Venezuela)	26	Renzo Zambrano	1	0	0	0	0	1
14	FW	(Senegal)	77	Dame Diop	1	0	0	0	0	1
14	MF	(Armenia)	97	David Davidyan	1	0	0	0	0	1
14	MF	(Brazil)	20	Lucas Villela	1	0	0	0	0	1
14	MF	(North Macedonia)	10	Stefan Spirovski	1	0	0	0	0	1
14	DF	(Colombia)	8	Juan Bravo	1	0	0	0	0	1
14	MF	(Moldova)	29	Eugeniu Cociuc	0	0	0	0	1	1
14				Own goal	1	0	0	0	0	1
				TOTALS	72	4	6	0	8	90

=== Clean sheets ===
Place	Position	Nation	Number	Name	Premier League	Armenian Cup	UEFA Champions League	UEFA Europa League	UEFA Europa Conference League	Total
1	GK	(Armenia)	71	Stanislav Buchnev	12	1	0	0	0	13
2	GK	(Armenia)	1	David Yurchenko	3	0	1	2	2	8
3	GK	(Armenia)	16	Henri Avagyan	1	0	0	0	0	1
3	GK	(Armenia)	32	Sergey Mikaelyan	1	0	0	0	0	1
				TOTALS	15	1	1	2	2	21

Henri Avagyan & Sergey Mikaelyan both played in Pyuniks 3-0 victory over BKMA Yerevan on 1 April 2022

=== Disciplinary record ===
Number	Nation	Position	Name	Premier League		Armenian Cup		UEFA Champions League		UEFA Europa League		UEFA Europa Conference League		Total	
Number	Nation	Position	Name	Booked	Sent off (straight red)	Booked	Sent off (straight red)	Booked	Sent off (straight red)	Booked	Sent off (straight red)	Booked	Sent off (straight red)	Booked	Sent off (straight red)
2	(Bosnia and Herzegovina)	FW	Luka Juričić	6	0	0	0	1	0	0	0	1	0	8	0
4	(North Macedonia)	DF	Kire Ristevski	1	0	1	0	0	0	0	0	0	0	2	0
6	(Brazil)	DF	Juninho	2	0	0	0	1	0	0	0	0	0	3	0
7	(Armenia)	MF	Edgar Malakyan	3	0	0	0	1	0	0	0	0	0	4	0
8	(Colombia)	DF	Juan Bravo	1	0	0	0	0	0	0	0	0	0	1	0
9	(Armenia)	MF	Artak Dashyan	5	0	0	0	1	0	0	0	0	0	6	0
10	(North Macedonia)	MF	Stefan Spirovski	1	0	0	0	0	0	0	0	0	0	1	0
11	(Armenia)	MF	Hovhannes Harutyunyan	6	0	1	0	0	0	0	0	2	0	9	0
12	(Haiti)	FW	Jonel Désiré	3	0	0	0	0	0	0	0	0	0	3	0
14	(Nigeria)	FW	Yusuf Otubanjo	2	0	0	0	1	0	0	0	0	0	3	0
15	(Russia)	DF	Mikhail Kovalenko	4	0	0	0	2	0	0	0	1	0	7	0
17	(Ukraine)	MF	Roman Karasyuk	1	0	0	0	0	0	0	0	0	0	1	0
18	(Venezuela)	FW	José Caraballo	2	0	0	0	0	0	0	0	0	0	2	0
20	(Brazil)	MF	Lucas Villela	2	0	0	0	0	0	0	0	0	0	2	0
21	(Armenia)	DF	Arthur Avagyan	2	0	0	0	1	0	0	0	0	0	3	0
27	(Estonia)	DF	Nikita Baranov	4	0	1	0	0	0	0	0	0	0	5	0
29	(Moldova)	MF	Eugeniu Cociuc	0	0	0	0	1	0	0	0	1	0	2	0
44	(Ukraine)	DF	Alan Aussi	1	0	0	0	0	0	0	0	0	0	1	0
71	(Armenia)	GK	Stanislav Buchnev	4	0	1	0	0	0	0	0	0	0	5	0
79	(Ukraine)	DF	Serhiy Vakulenko	1	0	0	0	1	0	1	0	1	0	4	0
88	(Armenia)	MF	Yuri Gareginyan	3	0	1	0	0	0	1	0	0	0	5	0
90	(Serbia)	DF	Aleksandar Miljković	8	1	1	0	0	0	0	0	3	0	12	1
95	(Ukraine)	DF	Anton Bratkov	4	0	0	0	0	0	1	0	2	0	7	0
97	(Armenia)	MF	David Davidyan	6	0	0	0	0	0	0	0	0	0	6	0
Players away on loan:
Players who left Pyunik during the season:
1	(Armenia)	GK	David Yurchenko	1	0	0	0	0	0	0	0	1	0	2	0
5	(Serbia)	MF	Zoran Gajić	0	0	0	0	1	0	0	0	0	0	1	0
8	(Brazil)	MF	Andre Mensalao	2	0	0	0	0	0	0	0	0	0	2	0
20	(Serbia)	MF	Nemanja Mladenović	0	0	0	0	1	0	0	0	0	0	1	0
26	(Venezuela)	MF	Renzo Zambrano	0	0	0	0	1	0	0	0	0	0	1	0
30	(Venezuela)	DF	Alexander González	2	0	0	0	1	0	0	0	0	0	3	0
70	(Serbia)	FW	Uroš Nenadović	1	0	0	0	0	0	0	0	0	0	1	0
87	(Armenia)	FW	Aleksandr Karapetyan	0	0	0	0	0	0	0	0	1	0	1	0
			TOTALS	80	1	3	0	13	0	3	0	13	0	112	1
