= 2023–24 FC Pyunik season =

Pyunik
2023-24 season
- Chairman: Rafik Hayrapetyan
- Manager: Yegishe Melikyan
- Stadium: Republican Stadium
- Premier League: Champions
- Armenian Cup: Semifinal
- UEFA Europa Conference League: Third qualifying round
- Top goalscorer: League: Yusuf Otubanjo (21); All: Yusuf Otubanjo (21)
Home colours	Away colours

The 2023–24 season was Pyunik's 30th season in the Armenian Premier League.

== Season overview ==
On 23 June, Arthur Avagyan extended his contract with Pyunik until 31 May 2024, whilst Nikita Baranov extended his contract with Pyunik until 31 December 2024.

On 24 June, Pyunik announced that David Davidyan had made his loan move from Khimki permanent, signing a contract until the summer of 2025.

On 28 June, Pyunik announced the signing of Artak Grigoryan who'd last played for Alashkert. The following day, Arman Hovhannisyan joined Pyunik from Ararat Yerevan, and Taofiq Jibril joined after he'd left Ararat-Armenia.

On 2 July, Yusuf Otubanjo extended his contract with Pyunik until the summer of 2025.

On 10 July, Pyunik announced the signing of Vagner Gonçalves on loan for the season from Dinamo Tbilisi.

On 5 August, Pyunik announced the signing of free-agent Ravanelli, who'd appeared for the club during their preseason training.

On 19 August, Pyunik announced the signing of free-agent Régis.

On 31 August, Pyunik announced the signing of free-agent Gustavo Marmentini, who'd last played for PAS Lamia 1964.

On 13 September, Pyunik announced the signing of free-agent Sam Hendriks, who'd last played for Olympiakos Nicosia.

On 14 December, Arthur Avagyan announced his retirement from football.

On 18 December, Vyacheslav Afyan joined BKMA Yerevan to complete his military service, whilst the following day, 19 December, Gustavo Marmentini and Régis both left the club by mutual consent.

On 11 January, Brazilian club São Bento announced the signing of Ravanelli from Pyunik. On 12 January, Serges Déblé returned to Pyunik as a free-agent having previously been playing for Tobol.

On 15 January, Pyunik announced the signing of Solomon Udo as a free-agent having previously been playing for Caspiy.

On 17 January, Pyunik announced the departure of Hovhannes Harutyunyan to Sochi.

On 19 January, Pyunik announced the return of Luka Juričić, on loan until the end of the season, from CFR Cluj.

On 29 January, Pyunik announced that Eugeniu Cociuc had re-joined the club having original left in the summer.

On 20 February, Pyunik announced the signing of Tarik Isić from Sogdiana Jizzakh, and that young striker Levon Vardanyan had joined BKMA Yerevan on loan for the remainder of the season.

On 26 February, Hovhannes Harutyunyan returned to the club on loan for the remainder of the season from Sochi, whilst Petros Alekyan joined Shirak on loan for the remainder of the season.

== Squad ==
As of match played 25 May 2024

Number	Name	Nationality	Position	Date of birth (age)	Signed from	Signed in	Contract ends	Apps.	Goals
Goalkeepers
16	Henri Avagyan	(Armenia)	GK	16 January 1996 (aged 28)	BKMA Yerevan	2022		9	0
32	Sergey Mikaelyan	(Armenia)	GK	21 July 2002 (aged 21)	Academy	2020		1	0
71	Stanislav Buchnev	(Armenia)	GK	17 July 1990 (aged 33)	Fakel Voronezh	2020	2024	106	0
Defenders
3	Arman Hovhannisyan	(Armenia)	DF	7 July 1993 (aged 30)	Ararat Yerevan	2023		116	0
5	James Santos	(Brazil)	DF	15 July 1995 (aged 28)	Unattached	2023		52	7
6	Juninho	(Brazil)	DF	29 July 1995 (aged 28)	Unattached	2021		104	8
8	Juan Bravo	(Colombia)	DF	1 April 1990 (aged 34)	Unattacehd	2023		30	6
15	Mikhail Kovalenko	(Russia)	DF	25 January 1995 (aged 29)	Olimp-Dolgoprudny	2022	2024	79	4
19	Tarik Isić	(Bosnia and Herzegovina)	DF	8 October 1994 (aged 29)	Sogdiana Jizzakh	2024		6	0
48	Hrachya Sargsyan	(Armenia)	DF	12 May 2006 (aged 18)	Academy	2024		2	0
79	Serhiy Vakulenko	(Ukraine)	DF	7 September 1993 (aged 30)	Ararat-Armenia	2022	2024	39	0
95	Anton Bratkov	(Ukraine)	DF	14 May 1993 (aged 31)	Metalist 1925 Kharkiv	2021	2024	110	1
	Karen Muradyan	(Armenia)	DF	1 April 2001 (aged 23)	Academy	2017		0	0
Midfielders
4	Solomon Udo	(Armenia)	MF	14 December 1997 (aged 26)	Unattached	2024		13	0
7	Edgar Malakyan	(Armenia)	MF	22 September 1990 (aged 33)	Unattached	2023			
9	Artak Dashyan	(Armenia)	MF	20 November 1989 (aged 34)	Atyrau	2021	2024	98	15
10	Artak Grigoryan	(Armenia)	MF	19 October 1987 (aged 36)	Unattached	2023		28	0
11	Hovhannes Harutyunyan	(Armenia)	MF	25 May 1999 (aged 25)	on loan from Sochi	2024	2024	156	27
20	Lucas Villela	(Brazil)	MF	24 March 1994 (aged 30)	Unattached	2023		53	5
23	Vagner Gonçalves	(Brazil)	MF	27 April 1996 (aged 28)	on loan from Dinamo Tbilisi	2023	2024	34	7
29	Eugeniu Cociuc	(Moldova)	MF	11 May 1993 (aged 31)	Zimbru Chișinău	2024		43	2
97	David Davidyan	(Armenia)	MF	14 December 1997 (aged 26)	Khimki	2023	2025	70	2
Forwards
2	Luka Juričić	(Bosnia and Herzegovina)	FW	25 November 1996 (aged 27)	on loan from CFR Cluj	2024	2024	59	29
14	Yusuf Otubanjo	(Nigeria)	FW	12 September 1992 (aged 31)	Ararat-Armenia	2022	2025	86	42
18	José Caraballo	(Venezuela)	FW	21 February 1996 (aged 28)	Unattached	2022		116	21
28	Sam Hendriks	(Netherlands)	FW	25 January 1995 (aged 29)	Unattached	2023		28	6
37	Vrezh Chiloyan	(Armenia)	FW	6 April 2002 (aged 22)	Academy	2022		1	0
68	Narek Baroyan	(Armenia)	FW	5 May 2005 (aged 19)	Academy	2022		1	0
88	Serges Déblé	(Ivory Coast)	FW	1 October 1989 (aged 34)	Unattached	2024		21	9
Players away on loan
19	Levon Vardanyan	(Armenia)	FW	2 November 2003 (aged 20)	Academy	2019	2025	38	1
83	Vyacheslav Afyan	(Armenia)	MF	28 October 2005 (aged 18)	Academy	2022		1	0
85	Karlen Hovhannisyan	(Armenia)	MF	26 April 2005 (aged 19)	Academy	2023		1	0
89	Aris Karapetyan	(Armenia)	FW	24 May 2005 (aged 19)	Academy	2022		0	0
	Mark Avetisyan	(Armenia)	DF	24 June 2005 (aged 18)	Academy	2022		0	0
	Petros Alekyan	(Armenia)	MF	25 December 2005 (aged 18)	Academy	2024		0	0
	Grenik Petrosyan	(Armenia)	FW	5 December 2001 (aged 22)	Academy	2018		21	0
Players who left during the season
12	Ravanelli	(Brazil)	MF	29 August 1997 (aged 26)	Unattached	2023		10	0
21	Arthur Avagyan	(Armenia)	DF	4 July 1987 (aged 36)	Noravank	2022	2024	10	0
22	Gustavo Marmentini	(Brazil)	MF	8 March 1994 (aged 30)	Unattached	2023		8	2
24	Taofiq Jibril	(Nigeria)	FW	23 April 1998 (aged 26)	Unattached	2023		18	0
27	Nikita Baranov	(Estonia)	DF	19 August 1992 (aged 31)	Ħamrun Spartans	2021	2024	50	2
77	Régis	(Brazil)	MF	16 January 1998 (aged 26)	Unattached	2023		5	1
90	Aleksandar Miljković	(Serbia)	DF	26 February 1990 (aged 34)	Partizan	2022		36	2

== Transfers ==
=== In ===
Date	Position	Nationality	Name	From	Fee	Ref.
24 June 2023	MF	(Armenia)	David Davidyan	Khimki	Undisclosed	
28 June 2023	MF	(Armenia)	Artak Grigoryan	Unattached	Free	
29 June 2023	DF	(Armenia)	Arman Hovhannisyan	Ararat Yerevan	Undisclosed	
29 June 2023	FW	(Nigeria)	Taofiq Jibril	Unattached	Free	
5 August 2023	MF	(Brazil)	Ravanelli	Unattached	Free	
19 August 2023	MF	(Brazil)	Régis	Unattached	Free	
31 August 2023	MF	(Brazil)	Gustavo Marmentini	Unattached	Free	
13 September 2023	FW	(Netherlands)	Sam Hendriks	Unattached	Free	
12 January 2024	FW	(Ivory Coast)	Serges Déblé	Unattached	Free	
15 January 2024	MF	(Armenia)	Solomon Udo	Unattached	Free	
29 January 2024	MF	(Moldova)	Eugeniu Cociuc	Unattached	Free	
20 February 2024	DF	(Bosnia and Herzegovina)	Tarik Isić	Sogdiana Jizzakh	Undisclosed	

=== Loans in ===
Date from	Position	Nationality	Name	From	Date to	Ref.
10 July 2023	MF	(Brazil)	Vagner Gonçalves	Dinamo Tbilisi	30 June 2024	
19 January 2024	FW	(Bosnia and Herzegovina)	Luka Juričić	CFR Cluj	End of season	
26 February 2024	MF	(Armenia)	Hovhannes Harutyunyan	Sochi	End of season	

=== Out ===
Date	Position	Nationality	Name	To	Fee	Ref.
22 August 2023	FW	(Bosnia and Herzegovina)	Luka Juričić	CFR Cluj	Undisclosed	
11 January 2024	MF	(Brazil)	Ravanelli	São Bento	Undisclosed	
17 January 2024	MF	(Armenia)	Hovhannes Harutyunyan	Sochi	Undisclosed	
4 March 2024	FW	(Nigeria)	Taofiq Jibril	West Armenia	Undisclosed	

=== Loans out ===
Date from	Position	Nationality	Name	To	Date to	Ref.
7 July 2023	DF	(Armenia)	Mark Avetisyan	BKMA Yerevan	30 June 2025	
7 July 2023	MF	(Armenia)	Karlen Hovhannisyan	BKMA Yerevan	30 June 2025	
7 July 2023	FW	(Armenia)	Aris Karapetyan	BKMA Yerevan	30 June 2025	
31 July 2023	FW	(Armenia)	Vrezh Chiloyan	Van	1 March 2024	
11 August 2023	DF	(Armenia)	Karen Muradyan	Van	1 March 2024	
18 December 2023	MF	(Armenia)	Vyacheslav Afyan	BKMA Yerevan		
20 February 2024	FW	(Armenia)	Levon Vardanyan	BKMA Yerevan	End of season	
26 February 2024	MF	(Armenia)	Petros Alekyan	Shirak	End of season	

=== Released ===
Date	Position	Nationality	Name	Joined	Date	Ref
16 June 2023	DF	(North Macedonia)	Kire Ristevski	Ethnikos Achna	10 August 2023	
16 June 2023	MF	(Armenia)	Yuri Gareginyan	Alashkert	29 June 2023	
16 June 2023	MF	(North Macedonia)	Stefan Spirovski	Ethnikos Achna	5 July 2023	
16 June 2023	MF	(Ukraine)	Roman Karasyuk	Zemplín Michalovce	9 August 2023	
16 June 2023	FW	(Haiti)	Jonel Désiré	Telavi	2 August 2023	
1 August 2023	DF	(Serbia)	Aleksandar Miljković	Noah	2 August 2023	
21 August 2023	MF	(Moldova)	Eugeniu Cociuc	re-signed	29 January 2024	
14 December 2023	DF	(Armenia)	Arthur Avagyan	Retirement		
19 December 2023	MF	(Brazil)	Gustavo Marmentini	Alashkert	15 January 2024	
19 December 2023	MF	(Brazil)	Régis	Chapecoense	19 April 2024	
31 December 2023	DF	(Estonia)	Nikita Baranov	Paide Linnameeskond	17 January 2024	

== Friendlies ==
1 July 2023	Samtredia	0–4	Pyunik	Tbilisi, Georgia
19:00 (UTC+4)		Report	Dashyan; Davidyan; Jibril

3 July 2023	Telavi	0–0	Pyunik	Tbilisi, Georgia
11:00 (UTC+4)		Report

3 July 2023	Samgurali Tsqaltubo	1–7	Pyunik	Tbilisi, Georgia
19:00 (UTC+4)	Markovina 57'	Report	Vardanyan 20', 57'; Villela 32'; Jibril 54'; Trialist 65'; Davidyan 75'; Juričić 77'

6 July 2023	Torpedo Kutaisi	0–3	Pyunik	Tbilisi, Georgia
20:00 (UTC+4)		Report	Otubanjo 14', 60'; Miljković 54'

22 January 2024	Pyunik	–	Orenburg	Antalya, Turkey
(UTC+4)

22 January 2024	Shakhtar Donetsk	2–0	Pyunik	Antalya, Turkey
16:30 (UTC+4)	Kevin 14'; Tsukanov 82'	Report

29 January 2024	Pyunik	2–0	Borac Banja Luka	Antalya, Turkey
18:30 (UTC+4)	Juričić 25'; Malakyan 64'	Report

4 February 2024	Pyunik	4–2	Ordabasy	Antalya, Turkey
16:30 (UTC+4)	Juričić 24'; Villela 31'; Artak Dashyan 42'; Gonçalves 54'	Report	Reginaldo 20'; Tungyshbayev 50'
Note: Match to consist of four 30-minute periods.

7 February 2024	Pyunik	2–1	Shakhter Karagandy	Antalya, Turkey
18:00 (UTC+4)	Malakyan (penalty missed); Kovalenko; Vakulenko	Report	Tattybayev
Note: Match to consist of four 30-minute periods.

10 February 2024	Pyunik	0–4	Zorya Luhansk	Antalya, Turkey
(UTC+4)		Report	Voloshyn; Benedyuk; Horbach

11 February 2024	Pyunik	0–2	Riga	Antalya, Turkey
(UTC+4)		Report	Niang 5', 27'

14 February 2024	Pyunik	1–1	Pakhtakor	Antalya, Turkey
18:00 (UTC+4)	Hendriks 58'	Report	Saidnurullaev 83'

15 February 2024	Oleksandriya	3–2	Pyunik	Antalya, Turkey
13:00 (UTC+4)	Lohinov 27'; Kovalets 40'	Report	Dashyan; Juričić

== Competitions ==
=== Overview ===
Competition	First match	Last match	Starting round	Final position	Record							
Competition	First match	Last match	Starting round	Final position	Pld	W	D	L	GF	GA	GD	Win %
Premier League	31 July 2023	25 May 2024	Matchday 1	Winners	36	24	10	2	84	27	+57	66.67
Armenian Cup	24 November 2023	8 April 2024	Second Round	Semifinal	3	2	0	1	8	5	+3	66.67
UEFA Europa Conference League	13 July 2023	17 August 2023	First qualifying round	Third qualifying round	6	4	0	2	9	8	+1	66.67
Total					45	30	10	5	101	40	+61	66.67

Last updated: 25 May 2024
Source: Competitions

=== Premier League ===
==== Results summary ====
Overall								Home						Away					
Pld	W	D	L	GF	GA	GD	Pts	W	D	L	GF	GA	GD	W	D	L	GF	GA	GD
36	24	10	2	84	28	+56	82	13	5	0	47	14	+33	11	5	2	37	14	+23

Last updated: 25 May 2024.
Source: See Results

==== Results by round ====
Round	1	2	3	4	5	6	7	8	9	10	11	12	13	14	15	16	17	18	19	20	21	22	23	24	25	26	27	28	29	30	31	32	33	34	35	36
Ground	A	H	A (Note: matchday 4)	A (Note: matchday 3)	H	A	H	A	H	H	A	H	H	A	H	A	H	A	A	H	A	A	H	A	H	A	H	H	A	H	H	A	H	A	H	A
Result	W	D	D	W	W	W	W	W	W	W	W	D	W	W	W	W	W	D	D	D	L	D	W	L	W	D	D	W	W	D	W	W	W	W	W	W
Position	3	2	7	2	1	1	1	1	1	1	1	1	1	1	1	1	1	1	1	1	1	1	1	1	1	1	2	2	2	2	2	2	2	2	1	1

Updated to match(es) played on 25 May 2024. Source: See Results
A = Away; H = Home; W = Win; D = Draw; L = Loss

==== Results ====
31 July 2023 1	Alashkert	0–2	Pyunik	Yerevan
18:00 (UTC+4)	Khachatryan (yellow card) 40'; Grigoryan (yellow card) 62'; Mimito (red card) 76'; Čančarević (yellow card) 81'; Gareginyan (yellow card) 87'	Report	Malakyan 37'; Harutyunyan 77'	Stadium: Alashkert Stadium; Referee: Henrik Nalbandian

6 August 2023 2	Pyunik	1–1	Ararat Yerevan	Abovyan
19:00 (UTC+4)	Villela 7' (yellow card) 62'; Baranov (yellow card) 25'	Report	Ransom 5' (pen.); Mahmoud (yellow card) 45+3'; Mzoughi (yellow card) 79'	Stadium: City Stadium; Referee: Artem Gasparyan

20 August 2023 4	Urartu	1–1	Pyunik	Yerevan
19:00 (UTC+4)	Salou 30' (yellow card) 90'; Piloyan (yellow card) 57'; Marcos Júnior (red card) 90+9'; Antwi (yellow card) 90+9'	Report	Otubanjo 26' (yellow card) 38'; Bratkov (yellow card) 53'; Kovalenko (yellow card) 64'; Malakyan (red card) 90+9'; Davidyan (yellow card) 90+9'	Stadium: Urartu Stadium; Referee: Henrik Nalbandian

23 August 2023 3	Ararat-Armenia	1–2	Pyunik	Yerevan
19:00 (UTC+4)	Yenne 21' (yellow card) 69' (yellow-red card) 73'; Muradyan (yellow card) 69'; Nondi (yellow card) 90+4'	Report	Villela (yellow card) 60'; Dashyan 70' (pen.); Juninho 76'; Buchnev (yellow card) 90+3'	Stadium: FFA Stadium; Referee: Artem Gasparyan
Note: Match original scheduled for 14 August 2023, but postponed on 11 August 2023, due to Pyunik making an emergency landing on the way back from their UEFA Europa Conference League against Bodø/Glimt on 10 August 2023.

28 August 2023 5	Pyunik	3–0	West Armenia	Yerevan
19:00 (UTC+4)	Dashyan (yellow card) 49'; Otubanjo (yellow card) 63' (goal) 69', 78' (pen.); Villela 65'	Report	Movsisyan (yellow card) 53' (red card) 76'; Dziov (yellow card) 90'	Stadium: Urartu Stadium; Referee: Ashot Harutyunyan

2 September 2023 6	Van	0–5	Pyunik	Charentsavan
17:00 (UTC+4)	Cifuentes (yellow card) 87' (yellow-red card) 90+1'	Report	Otubanjo 21', 42', 49' (yellow card) 60'; Malakyan 79'; Régis 90+1'	Stadium: City Stadium; Referee: Henrik Nalbandian

16 September 2023 7	Pyunik	3–0	BKMA Yerevan	Gyumri
16:00 (UTC+4)	Otubanjo 7'; Juninho 34'; Harutyunyan 40' (yellow card) 57'	Report	Simonyan (yellow card) 39'; Khamoyan (yellow card) 65'	Stadium: City Stadium; Referee: Vardan Manukyan

21 September 2023 8	Noah	0–1	Pyunik	Armavir
19:00 (UTC+4)	Varela (yellow card) 68'; Gladon (yellow card) 85'; Hambardzumyan (yellow card) 86'	Report	Malakyan (red card) 48'; Harutyunyan 87' (pen.); Grigoryan (yellow card) 90+3'; Buchnev (yellow card) 90+4'; Caraballo (yellow card) 90+4'	Stadium: City Stadium; Referee: Ashot Ghaltakhchyan

25 September 2023 9	Pyunik	1–0	Shirak	Gyumri
16:00 (UTC+4)	Caraballo 5'; Vakulenko (yellow card) 32' (yellow-red card) 87'; Harutyunyan (yellow card) 42'; Grigoryan (yellow card) 60'	Report	R.Darbinyan (yellow card) 47'; Tsarukyan (yellow card) 78'	Stadium: City Stadium; Referee: Zaven Hovhannisyan

29 September 2023 10	Pyunik	3–1	Alashkert	Gyumri
19:00 (UTC+4)	Harutyunyan 38' (pen.); Gonçalves 44'; Dashyan (yellow card) 59' (goal) 67' Davidyan (yellow card) 90'	Report	Nalbandyan 12'; Wbeymar (yellow card) 36'; Kocharyan (yellow card) 63'	Stadium: City Stadium; Referee: Henrik Nalbandian

4 October 2023 11	Ararat Yerevan	0–5	Pyunik	Yerevan
17:00 (UTC+4)	Malakyan (yellow card) 67'	Report	Kovalenko 10'; Caraballo 38'; Gonçalves (yellow card) 50' (goal) 71'; Malakyan 59'; Marmentini 86'	Stadium: Republican Stadium; Referee: Yura Mahtesyan

20 October 2023 12	Pyunik	1–1	Ararat-Armenia	Yerevan
18:00 (UTC+4)	Bratkov (yellow card) 24'; Villela 28'; Otubanjo (yellow card) 56'	Report	Ambartsumyan (yellow card) 39'; Muradyan (yellow card) 78'; Tera 90+1'; Alemão (yellow card) 90+6'	Stadium: Junior Sports Stadium; Referee: Henrik Nalbandian

25 October 2023 13	Pyunik	3–1	Urartu	Yerevan
15:00 (UTC+4)	Hendriks 17'; James 35'; Harutyunyan 44' (pen.); Buchnev (yellow card) 75'; Gonçalves (yellow card) 90+2'	Report	Tsymbalyuk (yellow card) 43'; Maksimenko 45+7'; Isaac (yellow card) 51'; Margaryan (yellow card) 90'; Marcos Júnior (yellow card) 90+2'; Antwi (yellow card) 90+5'	Stadium: Junior Sports Stadium; Referee: Zaven Hovhannisyan

29 October 2023 14	West Armenia	2–3	Pyunik	Yerevan
14:00 (UTC+4)	Ufuoma (yellow card) 45+2'; Mensalão 47'; Tarasenko 90+2'	Report	Hendriks 17'; Harutyunyan 45+1' (pen.); James (yellow card) 80' (goal) 87'	Stadium: Junior Sports Stadium; Referee: Hovhannes Kalantaryan

2 November 2023 15	Pyunik	6–0	Van	Yerevan
14:00 (UTC+4)	Hendriks 6'; Marmentini 35'; Otubanjo 46', 72'; Harutyunyan 63'; Buchnev (yellow card) 68'; Vardanyan 77'	Report	Dosa (yellow card) 68'; Mnatsakanyan (yellow card) 80'	Stadium: Junior Sports Stadium; Referee: Yura Mahtesyan

6 November 2023 16	BKMA Yerevan	1–4	Pyunik	Yerevan
19:00 (UTC+4)	Aghbalyan 10'; Nikoghosyan (yellow card) 32'; Khachumyan (yellow card) 77'; Simonyan (yellow card) 90'	Report	Dashyan 14'; Hendriks 33'; Otubanjo 41'; Vakulenko (yellow card) 45+1'; James 48'	Stadium: FFA Stadium; Referee: Ashot Ghaltakhchyan

11 November 2023 17	Pyunik	3–1	Noah	Yerevan
15:00 (UTC+4)	Otubanjo (yellow card) 42'; Harutyunyan 45+1' (pen.), 59'; Gonçalves 47'	Report	Alhaft 3'; Movsesyan (yellow card) 27'; Muradyan (yellow card) 43'	Stadium: Junior Sports Stadium; Referee: Artem Gasparyan

28 November 2023 18	Shirak	1–1	Pyunik	Gyumri
18:00 (UTC+4)	Misakyan (yellow card) 20'; R.Darbinyan 90+1'	Report	Dashyan 10'; Villela (yellow card) 18'; Marmentini (yellow card) 74'; Malakyan (yellow card) 75'	Stadium: City Stadium; Referee: Ashot Ghaltakhchyan

6 December 2023 19	Alashkert	1–1	Pyunik	Yerevan
14:00 (UTC+4)	Flores 43'; Carrillo (yellow card) 45'	Report	Harutyunyan 17' (pen.)	Stadium: Alashkert Stadium; Referee: Artem Gasparyan

11 December 2023 20	Pyunik	1–1	Ararat Yerevan	Yerevan
14:00 (UTC+4)	Gonçalves 1'; Davidyan (yellow card) 40'; James (yellow card) 60'; Bravo 86'	Report	Moustapha 5', 55'; Hadji (yellow card) 66'; Faye (yellow card) 83'; Minasyan	Stadium: Junior Sports Stadium; Referee: Zaven Hovhannisyan

23 February 2024 21	Ararat-Armenia	3–1	Pyunik	Yerevan
18:00 (UTC+4)	Duarte (yellow card) 28'; Yenne 30', 90+1'; Yattara 41'; Alemão (yellow card) 54'	Report	Villela (yellow card) 62'; Otubanjo 78'	Stadium: FFA Stadium; Referee: Yura Mahtesyan

27 February 2024 22	Urartu	1–1	Pyunik	Yerevan
19:00 (UTC+4)	Aghasaryan (yellow card) 29' (yellow-red card) 45+10'; Pešukić 58'; Melikhov (yellow card) 90+5'	Report	Dashyan 5'; Juričić (yellow card) 90+6'	Stadium: Urartu Stadium; Referee: Artem Gasparyan

4 March 2024 23	Pyunik	2–1	West Armenia	Yerevan
15:00 (UTC+4)	Dashyan 42'; Juričić (yellow card) 64'; Déblé 77'; Gonçalves (yellow card) 90+2'; James (yellow card) 90+4'; Grigoryan (yellow card) 90+4'	Report	Ufuoma 39'; Okoronkwo (yellow card) 63'; Strelnik (yellow card) 70'; Isaac (yellow card) 90'; Sargsyan (yellow card) 90+9'	Stadium: Junior Sports Stadium; Referee: Hovhannes Kalantaryan

8 March 2024 24	Van	1–0	Pyunik	Charentsavan
15:00 (UTC+4)	Touré 15'; Buhari (yellow card) 51'; Kojcic (yellow card) 90+3'; Yeghiazaryan (yellow card) 90+5'	Report	Caraballo (yellow card) 12'; Grigoryan (yellow card) 52'; Otubanjo (yellow card) 89'	Stadium: City Stadium; Referee: Henrik Nalbandian

16 March 2024 25	Pyunik	3–1	BKMA Yerevan	Yerevan
16:00 (UTC+4)	Otubanjo (yellow card) 37' (goal) 71'; Bravo 59'; Harutyunyan 74'	Report	Eloyan 86'	Stadium: Junior Sports Stadium; Referee: Vardan Manukyan

31 March 2024 26	Noah	1–1	Pyunik	Armavir
19:00 (UTC+4)	Minasyan (yellow card) 48'; Manvelyan 83'	Report	Otubanjo 7'; Bravo (yellow card) 38'; Kovalenko (yellow card) 67'; James (yellow card) 70'	Stadium: City Stadium; Referee: Yura Mahtesyan

4 April 2024 27	Pyunik	1–1	Shirak	Yerevan
16:00 (UTC+4)	James (yellow card) 34'; Juričić 84' (yellow card) 90+1'; Bratkov (yellow card) 90+3'; Déblé (yellow card) 90+11'	Report	Mnatsakanyan (yellow card) 56'; Traore (yellow card) 63'; Ghukasyan (yellow card) 70'; Misakyan (yellow card) 90+1'; Kodia 90+2'; Urushanyan (yellow card) 90+6'	Stadium: Junior Sports Stadium; Referee: Henrik Nalbandian

12 April 2024 28	Pyunik	2–1	Alashkert	Yerevan
16:00 (UTC+4)	Gonçalves 14'; Juričić 28'; Bravo (yellow card) 40'; Harutyunyan (yellow card) 90+4'	Report	Mensah 89'	Stadium: Junior Sports Stadium; Referee: Artem Gasparyan

17 April 2024 29	Ararat Yerevan	0–1	Pyunik	Yerevan
17:00 (UTC+4)	Mani (yellow card) 47'; Mahmoud (yellow card) 85'	Report	Bravo (yellow card) 30'; Otubanjo 56'	Stadium: Republican Stadium; Referee: Ashot Ghaltakhchyan

21 April 2024 30	Pyunik	2–2	Ararat-Armenia	Yerevan
16:00 (UTC+4)	James 23' (yellow card) 90+9'; Villela 59' (pen.); Vakulenko (yellow card) 65'; Gonçalves (yellow card) 84'	Report	Yenne 16'; Grigoryan (yellow card) 56'; Muradyan (yellow card) 61'; Yattara 82' (pen.); Ambartsumyan (yellow card) 87'	Stadium: Junior Sports Stadium; Referee: Yura Mahtesyan

28 April 2024 31	Pyunik	5–0	Urartu	Yerevan
16:00 (UTC+4)	Kovalenko 3'; Gonçalves 8'; Villela (yellow card) 25'; Hendriks (yellow card) 53' (goal) 90'; Davidyan 71'; Otubanjo 78'; Buchnev (yellow card) 90+4'	Report	Simonyan (yellow card) 29'; Stojanović (yellow card) 36'; Dolgov (yellow card) 55'	Stadium: Junior Sports Stadium; Referee: Vardan Manukyan

2 May 2024 32	West Armenia	1–4	Pyunik	Yerevan
16:00 (UTC+4)	Hakobyan (yellow card) 10'; Kayukov (yellow card) 69'; Oparaocha 74'; Sargsyan (yellow card) 90'	Report	Caraballo 21'; Hovhannisyan (yellow card) 22'; Otubanjo 42', 77', 90+2'	Stadium: Junior Sports Stadium; Referee: Artem Gasparyan

9 May 2024 33	Pyunik	3–1	Van	Yerevan
16:00 (UTC+4)	Kovalenko (yellow card) 38'; Gonçalves 43'; Cociuc 73'; Otubanjo 80'	Report	Buhari 15'	Stadium: Junior Sports Stadium; Referee: Ashot Ghaltakhchyan

14 May 2024 34	BKMA Yerevan	0–3	Pyunik	Yerevan
19:00 (UTC+4)	E.Vardanyan (yellow card) 88'	Report	Caraballo 11'; Otubanjo 38' (pen.); Avetisyan 90+3' (o.g.)	Stadium: FFA Stadium; Referee: Zaven Hovhannisyan

21 May 2024 35	Pyunik	3–0	Noah	Yerevan
17:00 (UTC+4)	Juninho (yellow card) 13'; Otubanjo 32'; Harutyunyan 43' (pen.); James (yellow card) 61'; Bratkov 85'	Report	Malembana (yellow card) 13'; Maia (yellow card) 45+1'; Miljković (yellow card) 73'	Stadium: Junior Sports Stadium; Referee: Artem Gasparyan

25 May 2024 36	Shirak	0–1	Pyunik	Gyumri
17:30 (UTC+4)	Misakyan (yellow card) 64'; Kone (yellow card) 83' (red card) 83'	Report	Kovalenko (yellow card) 42'; Dashyan 54'; Buchnev (yellow card) 90+7'	Stadium: City Stadium; Referee: Yura Mahtesyan

==== League table ====
Pos	Team	Pld	W	D	L	GF	GA	GD	Pts	Qualification or relegation
1	Pyunik (C)	36	24	10	2	84	28	+56	82	Qualification for the Champions League first qualifying round
2	Noah	36	26	2	8	69	33	+36	80	Qualification for the Conference League first qualifying round
3	Ararat-Armenia	36	23	6	7	73	34	+39	75	Qualification for the Conference League second qualifying round (Note: Ararat-Armenia qualified for the Conference League second qualifying round by winning the 2023–24 Armenian Cup. Since they qualified based on league position, the second Conference League first round spot was passed to the fourth-placed team.)
4	Urartu	36	13	11	12	49	49	0	50	Qualification for the Conference League first qualifying round
5	Alashkert	36	13	6	17	54	56	−2	45	
6	Ararat Yerevan	36	13	6	17	39	50	−11	45	
7	West Armenia	36	11	4	21	43	73	−30	37	
8	Shirak	36	8	9	19	28	46	−18	33	
9	Van	36	8	8	20	32	67	−35	32	
10	BKMA	36	7	6	23	32	67	−35	27	

Source: FFA Soccerway
Rules for classification: 1) Points; 2) Head-to-head points; 3) Head-to-head goal difference; 4) Head-to-head goals scored; 5) Matches won; 6) Goal difference; 7) Less red cards; 8) Less yellow cards; 9) Fair-play ranking 10) Draw
(C) Champions

=== Armenian Cup ===
24 November 2023 Second Round	Pyunik	3–1 (a.e.t.)	Ararat Yerevan	Yerevan
14:00 (UTC+4)	Malakyan 44' (pen.); Ravanelli (yellow card) 65'; Harutyunyan 93' (pen.); Hendriks 105+1'	Report	Ransom (yellow card) 21'; Mahmoud 24'; Mani (yellow card) 33'; Hakobyan (yellow card) 58'; Mkrtchyan (yellow card) 65'	Stadium: Junior Sports Stadium; Referee: Zaven Hovhannisyan

12 March 2024 Quarterfinal	Pyunik	5–3	Van	Yerevan
15:00 (UTC+4)	Bravo 16', 87'; Juričić 29', 67'; Harutyunyan 35'	Report	Touré 3' (pen.); Sani 23'; Boniface 50' (pen.) (yellow card) 75'; Kojčić (yellow card) 83'; Manucharyan (yellow card) 85'	Stadium: Junior Sports Stadium; Referee: Artem Gasparyan

8 April 2024 Semifinal	Pyunik	0–1	Ararat-Armenia	Yerevan
15:00 (UTC+4)	Gonçalves (yellow card) 45+2'; Villela (yellow card) 90+5'	Report	Serobyan 32'; Muradyan (yellow card) 34'; Yenne (yellow card) 45+2'; Yattara (yellow card) 90+5' (yellow-red card) 90+5'; Beglaryan (yellow card) 90+9'	Stadium: Junior Sports Stadium; Referee: Zaven Hovhannisyan

=== UEFA Europa Conference League ===
==== Qualifying rounds ====
13 July 2023 First qualifying round 1st leg	Pyunik (Armenia)	2–0	(Estonia) Narva Trans	Abovyan, Armenia
19:00 (UTC+4)	Juričić 65'; James 88'	Report	Maksimkin (yellow card) 15'	Stadium: Abovyan City Stadium; Attendance: 2,500; Referee: Kyriakos Athanasiou (Cyprus)
Note: Match played at the Abovyan City Stadium in Abovyan, instead of Pyuniks regular stadium, the Vazgen Sargsyan Republican Stadium in Yerevan.

20 July 2023 First qualifying round 2nd leg	Narva Trans (Estonia)	0–3 (0–5 agg.)	(Armenia) Pyunik	Rakvere, Estonia
19:30 (UTC+4)	Nikolajev (yellow card) 70'	Report	Dashyan 8'; Juninho 14' (yellow card) 15'; Juričić 66'	Stadium: Rakvere Linnastaadion; Attendance: 394; Referee: Andrew Davey (Northern Ireland)
Note: Match played at the Rakvere Linnastaadion in Rakvere, instead of Narva Trans regular stadium, the Narva Kreenholm Stadium in Narva, which did not meet UEFA requirements.

27 July 2023 Second qualifying round 1st leg	Kalmar (Sweden)	1–2	(Armenia) Pyunik	Kalmar, Sweden
21:00 (UTC+4)	Trenskow 50'; Romário (yellow card) 81'; Hümmet (yellow card) 81'	Report	Juričić 55'; Bravo 81'	Stadium: Guldfågeln Arena; Attendance: 7,421; Referee: Ian McNabb (Northern Ireland)

3 August 2023 Second qualifying round 2nd leg	Pyunik (Armenia)	2–1 (4–2 agg.)	(Sweden) Kalmar	Abovyan, Armenia
(UTC+4)	Dashyan 75'; Harutyunyan 77'; Buchnev (yellow card) 85'	Report	Rajović (yellow card) 56' (goal) 88'; Skrabb (yellow card) 63'; Sætra (yellow card) 88'	Stadium: Abovyan City Stadium; Referee: Igor Stojchevski (North Macedonia)
Note: Match played at the Abovyan City Stadium in Abovyan, instead of Pyuniks regular stadium, the Vazgen Sargsyan Republican Stadium in Yerevan.

10 August 2023 Third qualifying round 1st leg	Bodø/Glimt (Norway)	3–0	(Armenia) Pyunik	Bodø, Norway
20:00 (UTC+4)	Grønbæk 6'; Moumbagna 31'; Pellegrino 56'	Report	Bravo (yellow card) 44'	Stadium: Aspmyra Stadion; Attendance: 6,009; Referee: Ion Orlic (Moldova)

17 August 2023 Third qualifying round 2nd leg	Pyunik (Armenia)	0–3 (0–6 agg.)	(Norway) Bodø/Glimt	Yerevan, Armenia
20:00 (UTC+4)	Malakyan (yellow card) 42'; Juninho (yellow card) 62'	Report	Pellegrino 43' (pen.); Berg 49'; Gulliksen 54'	Stadium: Vazgen Sargsyan Republican Stadium; Attendance: 5,230; Referee: Matthew De Gabriele (Malta)

== Squad statistics ==
As of match played 25 May 2024

=== Appearances and goals ===
No.	Pos	Nat	Player	Total		Premier League		Armenian Cup		Europa Conference League	
No.	Pos	Nat	Player	Apps	Goals	Apps	Goals	Apps	Goals	Apps	Goals
2	FW	(Bosnia and Herzegovina) BIH	Luka Juričić	18	7	7+5	2	2	2	4	3
3	DF	(Armenia) ARM	Arman Hovhannisyan	9	0	3+6	0	0	0	0	0
4	MF	(Armenia) ARM	Solomon Udo	13	0	8+4	0	1	0	0	0
5	DF	(Brazil) BRA	James Santos	39	5	26+4	4	3	0	5+1	1
6	DF	(Brazil) BRA	Juninho	33	3	21+7	2	0	0	5	1
7	MF	(Armenia) ARM	Edgar Malakyan	35	4	8+18	3	2+1	1	3+3	0
8	DF	(Colombia) COL	Juan Bravo	23	5	8+9	2	2	2	2+2	1
9	MF	(Armenia) ARM	Artak Dashyan	34	9	24+3	7	0+1	0	6	2
10	MF	(Armenia) ARM	Artak Grigoryan	28	0	8+12	0	1+1	0	3+3	0
11	MF	(Armenia) ARM	Hovhannes Harutyunyan	36	15	23+5	12	2+1	2	4+1	1
14	FW	(Nigeria) NGA	Yusuf Otubanjo	40	21	27+4	21	2+1	0	5+1	0
15	DF	(Russia) RUS	Mikhail Kovalenko	36	2	20+10	2	0+2	0	4	0
16	GK	(Armenia) ARM	Henri Avagyan	6	0	5	0	1	0	0	0
18	FW	(Venezuela) VEN	José Caraballo	39	4	12+18	4	0+3	0	2+4	0
19	DF	(Bosnia and Herzegovina) BIH	Tarik Isić	6	0	2+3	0	1	0	0	0
20	MF	(Brazil) BRA	Lucas Villela	36	4	20+9	4	2+1	0	1+3	0
23	MF	(Brazil) BRA	Vagner Gonçalves	34	7	28+1	7	3	0	0+2	0
28	FW	(Netherlands) NED	Sam Hendriks	28	6	15+10	5	2+1	1	0	0
29	MF	(Moldova) MDA	Eugeniu Cociuc	5	1	3+2	1	0	0	0	0
48	DF	(Armenia) ARM	Hrachya Sargsyan	2	0	0+2	0	0	0	0	0
71	GK	(Armenia) ARM	Stanislav Buchnev	39	0	31	0	2	0	6	0
79	DF	(Ukraine) UKR	Serhiy Vakulenko	26	0	23	0	3	0	0	0
88	FW	(Ivory Coast) CIV	Serges Déblé	5	1	0+4	1	0+1	0	0	0
95	DF	(Ukraine) UKR	Anton Bratkov	42	1	33	1	2+1	0	6	0
97	MF	(Armenia) ARM	David Davidyan	39	1	22+9	1	1+1	0	3+3	0
Players away on loan:
19	FW	(Armenia) ARM	Levon Vardanyan	14	1	2+10	1	0	0	0+2	0
Players who left Pyunik during the season:
12	MF	(Brazil) BRA	Ravanelli	10	0	2+5	0	1	0	0+2	0
22	MF	(Brazil) BRA	Gustavo Marmentini	8	2	2+5	2	0+1	0	0	0
24	FW	(Nigeria) NGA	Taofiq Jibril	18	0	7+8	0	0	0	2+1	0
27	DF	(Estonia) EST	Nikita Baranov	7	0	4	0	0	0	2+1	0
77	MF	(Brazil) BRA	Régis	5	1	1+4	1	0	0	0	0
90	DF	(Serbia) SRB	Aleksandar Miljković	3	0	0	0	0	0	3	0

=== Goal scorers ===
Place	Position	Nation	Number	Name	Premier League	Armenian Cup	Europa Conference League	Total
1	FW	(Nigeria)	14	Yusuf Otubanjo	21	0	0	21
2	MF	(Armenia)	11	Hovhannes Harutyunyan	12	2	1	15
3	MF	(Armenia)	9	Artak Dashyan	7	0	2	9
4	MF	(Brazil)	23	Vagner Gonçalves	7	0	0	7
4	FW	(Bosnia and Herzegovina)	2	Luka Juričić	2	2	3	7
6	FW	(Netherlands)	28	Sam Hendriks	6	1	0	6
7	DF	(Brazil)	5	James Santos	4	0	1	5
7	DF	(Colombia)	8	Juan Bravo	2	2	1	5
9	MF	(Brazil)	20	Lucas Villela	4	0	0	4
9	FW	(Venezuela)	18	José Caraballo	4	0	0	4
9	MF	(Armenia)	7	Edgar Malakyan	3	1	0	4
12	DF	(Brazil)	6	Juninho	2	0	1	3
13	MF	(Brazil)	22	Gustavo Marmentini	2	0	0	2
13	DF	(Russia)	15	Mikhail Kovalenko	2	0	0	2
15	MF	(Brazil)	77	Régis	1	0	0	1
15	FW	(Armenia)	19	Levon Vardanyan	1	0	0	1
15	FW	(Ivory Coast)	88	Serges Déblé	1	0	0	1
15	MF	(Armenia)	97	David Davidyan	1	0	0	1
15	MF	(Moldova)	29	Eugeniu Cociuc	1	0	0	1
15	DF	(Ukraine)	95	Anton Bratkov	1	0	0	1
15				Own goal	1	0	0	1
				TOTALS	84	8	9	101

=== Clean sheets ===
Place	Position	Nation	Number	Name	Premier League	Armenian Cup	Europa Conference League	Total
1	GK	(Armenia)	71	Stanislav Buchnev	12	0	2	14
2	GK	(Armenia)	16	Henri Avagyan	1	0	0	1
				TOTALS	12	0	2	14

=== Disciplinary record ===
Number	Nation	Position	Name	Premier League		Armenian Cup		Europa Conference League		Total	
Number	Nation	Position	Name	Booked	Sent off (straight red)	Booked	Sent off (straight red)	Booked	Sent off (straight red)	Booked	Sent off (straight red)
2	(Bosnia and Herzegovina)	FW	Luka Juričić	3	0	0	0	0	0	3	0
3	(Armenia)	DF	Arman Hovhannisyan	1	0	0	0	0	0	1	0
5	(Brazil)	DF	James Santos	7	0	0	0	0	0	7	0
6	(Brazil)	DF	Juninho	1	0	0	0	2	0	3	0
7	(Armenia)	MF	Edgar Malakyan	1	2	0	0	1	0	2	2
8	(Colombia)	DF	Juan Bravo	3	0	0	0	1	0	4	0
9	(Armenia)	MF	Artak Dashyan	2	0	0	0	0	0	2	0
10	(Armenia)	MF	Artak Grigoryan	4	0	0	0	0	0	4	0
11	(Armenia)	MF	Hovhannes Harutyunyan	3	0	0	0	0	0	3	0
14	(Nigeria)	FW	Yusuf Otubanjo	7	0	0	0	0	0	7	0
15	(Russia)	DF	Mikhail Kovalenko	4	0	0	0	0	0	4	0
18	(Venezuela)	FW	José Caraballo	2	0	0	0	0	0	2	0
20	(Brazil)	MF	Lucas Villela	5	0	1	0	0	0	6	0
23	(Brazil)	MF	Vagner Gonçalves	4	0	1	0	0	0	5	0
28	(Netherlands)	FW	Sam Hendriks	1	0	0	0	0	0	1	0
71	(Armenia)	GK	Stanislav Buchnev	6	0	0	0	1	0	7	0
79	(Ukraine)	DF	Serhiy Vakulenko	4	1	0	0	0	0	4	1
88	(Ivory Coast)	FW	Serges Déblé	1	0	0	0	0	0	1	0
95	(Ukraine)	DF	Anton Bratkov	3	0	0	0	0	0	3	0
97	(Armenia)	MF	David Davidyan	2	0	0	0	0	0	2	0
Players away on loan:
Players who left Pyunik during the season:
12	(Brazil)	MF	Ravanelli	0	0	1	0	0	0	1	0
22	(Brazil)	MF	Gustavo Marmentini	1	0	0	0	0	0	1	0
27	(Estonia)	DF	Nikita Baranov	0	0	0	0	1	0	1	0
			TOTALS	67	3	3	0	5	0	75	3
