= Vagner Gonçalves =

Vagner Gonçalves may refer to:

- Vagner Gonçalves (Cape Verdean footballer)
- Vagner Gonçalves (Brazilian footballer)
