= Luka Juričić (footballer) =

Bosnian footballer (born 1996)

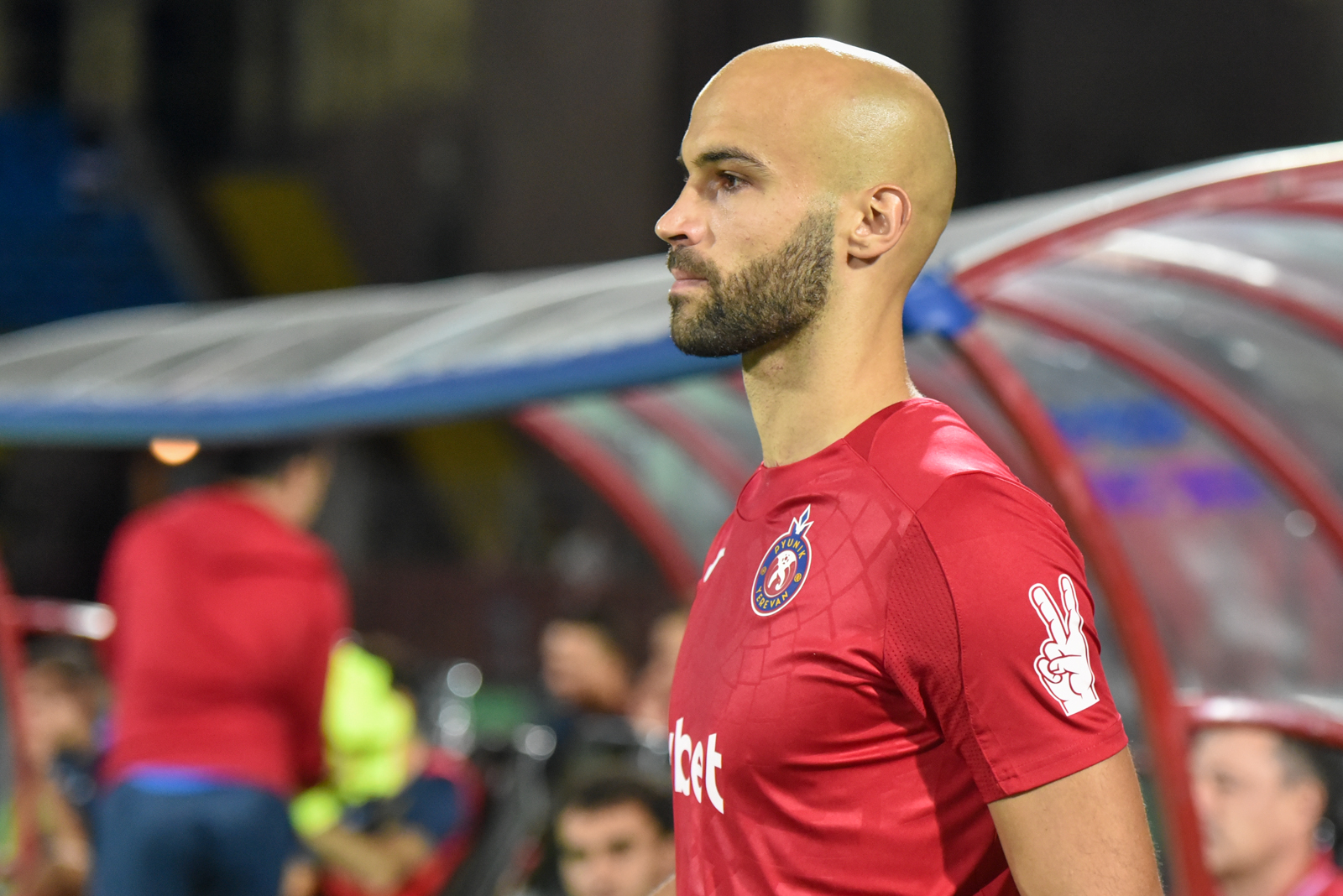
- Jurčić with Pyunik in 2022

Personal information
- Date of birth: 25 November 1996 (age 29)
- Place of birth: Neustadt an der Aisch, Germany
- Height: 1.89 m (6 ft 2 in)
- Position: Striker

Team information
- Current team: Borac Banja Luka
- Number: 7

Youth career
- –2014: Zrinjski Mostar
- 2014−2015: Široki Brijeg

Senior career*
Years	Team	Apps	(Gls)
2015−2017	Široki Brijeg	5	(0)
2015−2016	→ Neretvanac (loan)	21	(9)
2018	Neretvanac	12	(2)
2018−2019	Neretva	25	(13)
2019−2020	Šibenik	18	(8)
2020–2022	Željezničar	42	(11)
2022	Gimpo	6	(0)
2022–2023	Pyunik	29	(17)
2023–2025	CFR Cluj	15	(2)
2024	→ Pyunik (loan)	11	(2)
2025–	Borac Banja Luka	43	(31)

International career
2013–2014	Bosnia and Herzegovina U18	4	(2)
2014	Bosnia and Herzegovina U19	8	(4)
- * Club domestic league appearances and goals as of 20 September 2026

Luka Juričić (born 25 November 1996) is a professional footballer who plays as a striker for Bosnian Premier League club Borac Banja Luka. Born in Germany, he has represented Bosnia and Herzegovina at under-19 level.

== Career ==
In 2015, when Juričić suffered several serious knee injuries that almost ended his career, he was out for almost two years but managed to recover and continue his career.

=== Pyunik ===
On 3 July 2022, Armenian Premier League club Pyunik announced the signing of Juričić. On 8 February 2023, Juričić extended his contract with Pyunik until the end of the 2023/24 season.

=== CFR Cluj ===
On 22 August 2023, Juričić signed for Romanian Liga I club CFR Cluj.

==== Pyunik loan ====
On 19 January 2024, Juričić returned to Pyunik on loan for the rest of the season.

== Career statistics ==
=== Club ===
As of match played 20 September 2026

Appearances and goals by club, season and competition
Club	Season	League			National cup (Note: Includes Croatian Cup, Bosnian Cup, Korea Cup, Armenian Cup, Cupa României)		Continental		Total	
Club	Season	Division	Apps	Goals	Apps	Goals	Apps	Goals	Apps	Goals
Široki Brijeg	2016–17	Bosnian Premier League	5	0	–		–		5	0
Neretvanac (loan)	2015–16	3. HNL	13	7	–		–		13	7
Neretvanac (loan)	2016–17	3. HNL	8	2	–		–		8	2
Neretvanac	2017–18	3. HNL	12	2	1	0	–		13	2
Neretvanac	Total		33	11	1	0	–		34	11
Neretva	2018–19	3. HNL	25	13	1	0	–		26	13
Šibenik	2019–20	2. HNL	18	8	3	2	–		21	10
Željezničar	2020–21	Bosnian Premier League	25	8	2	1	1 (Note: Appearance in UEFA Europa League)	0	28	9
Željezničar	2021–22	Bosnian Premier League	17	3	1	0	–		18	3
Željezničar	Total		42	11	3	1	1	0	46	12
Gimpo	2022	K League 2	6	0	1	0	–		7	0
Pyunik	2022–23	Armenian Premier League	28	17	1	2	12 (Note: Five appearances and one goal in UEFA Champions League; two appearances in UEFA Europa League; five appearances and one goal in UEFA Europa Conference League)	3	41	22
Pyunik	2023–24	Armenian Premier League	1	0	–		4 (Note: Appearance(s) in UEFA Conference League)	3	5	3
Pyunik	Total		29	17	1	2	16	6	46	25
CFR Cluj	2023–24	Liga I	15	2	3	0	–		18	2
Pyunik (loan)	2023–24	Armenian Premier League	11	2	2	2	–		13	4
Borac Banja Luka	2025–26	Bosnian Premier League	35	27	0	0	1	0	36	27
Borac Banja Luka	2026–27	Bosnian Premier League	8	4	0	0	8 (Note: Two appearances and one goal in UEFA Champions League; six appearances and four goals in UEFA Conference League)	5	16	9
Borac Banja Luka	Total		43	31	0	0	9	5	52	36
Career total			227	95	15	7	26	11	268	113

== Honours ==
Široki Brijeg

- Bosnian Cup: 2016–17

Šibenik

- Croatian Second League: 2019–20

Pyunik

- Armenian Premier League: 2023–24

CFR Cluj

- Cupa României: 2024–25

Borac Banja Luka

- Bosnian Premier League: 2025–26

Individual

- Armenian Premier League top scorer: 2022–23
- Bosnian Premier League top scorer: 2025–26
