= Régis (footballer, born 1998) =

Brazilian footballer

Personal information
- Full name: Régis Tosatti Giacomin
- Date of birth: 16 January 1998 (age 28)
- Place of birth: Xanxerê, Brazil
- Height: 1.80 m (5 ft 11 in)
- Positions: Attacking midfielder; winger

Team information
- Current team: Al-Hamriyah
- Number: 10

Youth career
- 2015–2018: Chapecoense

Senior career*
Years	Team	Apps	(Gls)
2019–2021	Chapecoense	25	(1)
2020	→ Bahia (loan)	4	(1)
2020–2021	→ CRB (loan)	12	(0)
2021–2022	Hatta Club	0	(0)
2022	Levadiakos	2	(0)
2023	Náutico	18	(0)
2023	Pyunik	5	(1)
2024	Chapecoense	6	(0)
2024–2025	Al Dhaid		
2025–	Al-Hamriyah		
- * Club domestic league appearances and goals as of 10:19, 13 May 2024 (UTC)

Régis Tosatti Giacomin (born 16 January 1998), simply known as Régis, is a Brazilian professional footballer who plays as a forward for Al-Hamriyah.

== Club career ==
Régis was born in Xanxerê, Santa Catarina, and represented Chapecoense as a youth. Ahead of the 2019 season, after being regularly used with the under-23 squad in the previous campaign, he was promoted to the first team.

Régis made his first team debut on 20 January 2019, coming on as a late substitute for Yann in a 0–0 Campeonato Catarinense away draw against Metropolitano. Rarely used by manager Claudinei Oliveira, he became a regular under new manager Ney Franco, making his first start on 21 April and scoring the opener in a 1–1 draw at Avaí, as his side lost the state league on penalties.

Régis made his Série A debut on starting in a 2–0 home success over Internacional.

On 19 August 2023, Armenian Premier League club Pyunik announced the signing of Régis. On 19 December 2023, Pyunik announced the departure of Régis by mutual consent.

On 19 April 2024, Régis returned to Chapecoense.
