= Nemanja Mladenović (footballer, born 1993) =

Serbian footballer

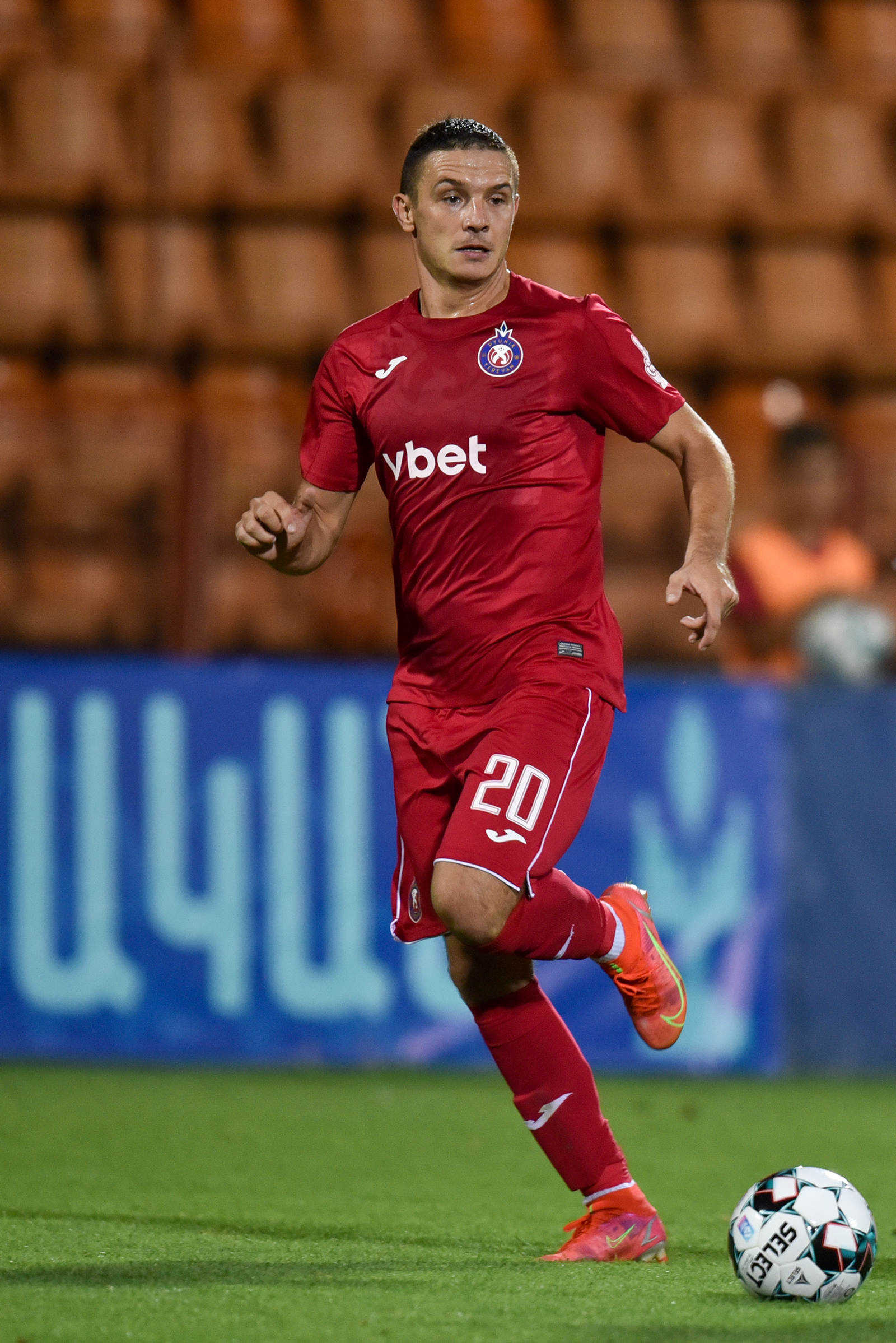

Personal information
- Full name: Nemanja Mladenović
- Date of birth: 3 March 1993 (age 33)
- Place of birth: Valjevo, FR Yugoslavia
- Height: 1.79 m (5 ft 10 in)
- Positions: Attacking midfielder; winger

Team information
- Current team: Anzio

Youth career
- OFK Beograd

Senior career*
Years	Team	Apps	(Gls)
2012	Kolubara	29	(1)
2013–2016	Metalac Gornji Milanovac	111	(13)
2017	Bodø/Glimt	3	(1)
2017	Zemun	17	(1)
2018	AEL	11	(0)
2018	OFK Bačka	15	(1)
2019–2020	Spartak Subotica	20	(1)
2020–2021	Javor Ivanjica	22	(1)
2021	Rad	18	(3)
2021–2022	Novi Pazar	20	(2)
2022	Napredak Kruševac	15	(0)
2022–2023	Pyunik	3	(0)
2023	Rad	12	(0)
2023	Legnano	8	(1)
2023–	Anzio	3	(1)

International career
2011–2012	Serbia U19	8	(2)
2015	Serbia U23	1	(1)
- * Club domestic league appearances and goals as of 20 December 2023

Nemanja Mladenović (Serbian Cyrillic: Немања Младеновић; born 3 March 1993) is a Serbian professional footballer who plays for Italian Serie D club Anzio.

== Club career ==
=== Kolubara ===
Born in Valjevo, Mladenović passed the youth school of OFK Beograd, and he was called to youth national selections as a member of a team from Karaburma. He moved to Kolubara in 2012 and that year he made 30 appearances, including 29 league and 1 cup match, and scored 1 goal.

=== Metalac Gornji Milanovac ===
Mladenović joined FK Metalac Gornji Milanovac on the beginning of 2013. He made 13 Serbian First League appearances until the end of 2012–13 season. For the 2013–14 season, Mladenović made 18 league appearances with 2 goals, and also played in a cup match against Partizan and play-off match against Rad. In 2014–15 season, Mladenović was the most standard player, playing all season matches, he scored 3 goals on 30 Serbian First League appearances, and also had 2 cup appearances and 2 play-off matches against Napredak Kruševac, after then Metalac promoted in Serbian SuperLiga. Mladenović made his SuperLiga debut in the first fixture of 2015–16 season, against Partizan. Mladenović scored his first goal for the 2016–17 season in a match against Red Star Belgrade on 29 July 2016, 15 minutes after he replaced Milan Stojanović in second half of the match.

=== Bodø/Glimt ===
On 26 January 2017, Mladenović signed with Bodø/Glimt. Mladenović scored his first goal on a debut match for new team, in 5–0 victory over Elverum on 17 April 2017. Several days later, on 26 April, he also scored Norwegian Football Cup match against Fauske/Sprint. Making 6 appearances with 2 goals in both Norwegian domestic competitions, Mladenović terminated a contract with the club and left as a free agent at the beginning of August same year.

=== Zemun ===
Mladenović returned to the Serbian side Zemun in summer 2017. He scored a goal and made an assist to Dejan Đenić on his debut match for 2–0 victory over Čukarički, after which he was elected for a player of the week in the Serbian SuperLiga. During the first half-season, Mladenović collected 18 matches at total in botn domestic competitions. In last days of December 2017, both sides mutually terminated the contract and Mladenović the club in the mid-season.

=== AEL ===
In late 2017, it was announced about Mladenović's moving to AEL. He officially promoted in new club on 3 January 2018, penning a two-and-a-half-year deal, along with fellow countryman Radomir Milosavljević and Bulgarian defender Hristofor Hubchev. Mladenović made his competitive debut for AEL on 14 January 2018, replacing Adnan Aganović in 3–1 defeat against Asteras Tripolis. Mladenović made his first start in 26th week of the 2017–18 Super League Greece campaign, Apollon Smyrnis. While with the club, Mladenović archived 11 league caps, mostly as a back-up, and also spent both of matches against PAS Giannina in quarterfinal of the Greek Football Cup as an unused substitution.

=== OFK Bačka ===
Returning to Serbia, Mladenović rejoined Zemun and started training with the club on 11 June 2018. Later, same month, Mladenović moved to OFK Bačka and signed one-year contract with new club. Ending of November 2018, Mladenović mutually terminated the contract and left the club as a free agent.

=== Spartak Subotica ===
On 15 January 2019, Mladenović joined Spartak Subotica.

== International career ==
Mladenović was called into the Serbia u19 team, making 8 appearances with 2 goals between 2011 and 2012. As a selector of Serbia u23, Milan Rastavac invited Mladenović in the squad for a friendly match on 22 December 2015, when he made his debut for the team scoring a goal in 3–0 victory over Qatar.

== Career statistics ==
As of match played 1 December 2018

Appearances and goals by club, season and competition
Club	Season	League			Cup		Continental		Other		Total	
Club	Season	Division	Apps	Goals	Apps	Goals	Apps	Goals	Apps	Goals	Apps	Goals
Kolubara	2011–12	Serbian First League	15	1	—		—		—		15	1
Kolubara	2012–13	Serbian First League	14	0	1	0	—		—		15	0
Kolubara	Total		29	1	1	0	—		—		30	1
Metalac Gornji Milanovac	2012–13	Serbian First League	13	1	—		—		—		13	1
Metalac Gornji Milanovac	2013–14	Serbian First League	18	2	1	0	—		1 (Note: Appearance in promotion play-offs)	0	20	2
Metalac Gornji Milanovac	2014–15	Serbian First League	30	3	2	0	—		2 (Note: Appearances in promotion play-offs)	0	34	3
Metalac Gornji Milanovac	2015–16	Serbian SuperLiga	33	6	1	2	—		—		34	8
Metalac Gornji Milanovac	2016–17	Serbian SuperLiga	17	1	1	0	—		—		18	1
Metalac Gornji Milanovac	Total		111	13	5	2	—		3	0	119	15
Bodø/Glimt	2017	OBOS-ligaen	3	1	3 (Note: Including a First round & Second round matches vs Fauske/Sprint & Sortland)	1	—		—		6	2
Zemun	2017–18	Serbian SuperLiga	17	1	1	0	—		—		18	1
AEL	2017–18	Super League Greece	11	0	0	0	—		—		11	0
OFK Bačka	2018–19	Serbian SuperLiga	15	1	1	0	—		—		16	1
Career total			186	17	10	3	—		3	0	199	20

== Honours ==
Individual

- Serbian SuperLiga Player of the Week: 2020–21 (Round 35)
