= Alan Aussi =

Syrian footballer (born 2001)

Alan Aussi ألان أوسي
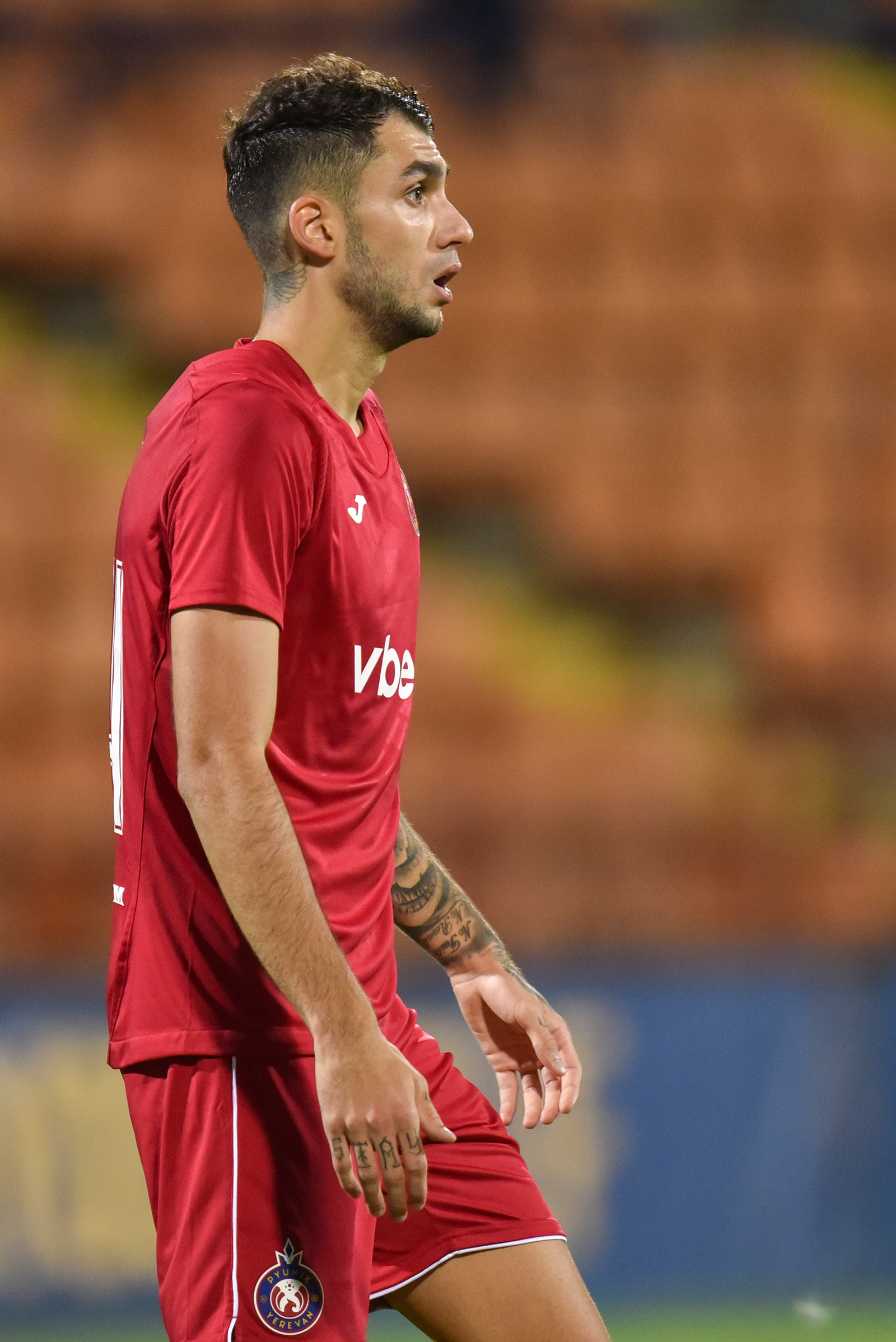
- Aussi with Pyunik in 2022

Personal information
- Full name: Alan Hozanovych Aussi
- Date of birth: 30 June 2001 (age 25)
- Place of birth: Donetsk, Ukraine
- Height: 1.87 m (6 ft 2 in)
- Position: Centre-back

Youth career
- 2008–2013: Shakhtar Donetsk
- 2013–2014: Azovstal-2 Mariupol
- 2014–2017: Shakhtar Donetsk
- 2017–2018: BRW-VIK Volodymyr-Volynskyi
- 2018–2019: Dynamo Kyiv
- 2018–2019: → Slovan Liberec (loan)

Senior career*
| Years | Team | Apps | (Gls) |
| 2019–2023 | Dynamo Kyiv | 0 | (0) |
| 2019–2020 | → Slovan Liberec B (loan) | 2 | (0) |
| 2020–2021 | → Torpedo-BelAZ Zhodino (loan) | 20 | (2) |
| 2022 | → Veres Rivne (loan) | 0 | (0) |
| 2022 | → Pyunik (loan) | 3 | (0) |
| 2023–2024 | Ponferradina B | 1 | (0) |
| 2024–2025 | CFR Cluj | 1 | (0) |
| 2025–2026 | F91 Dudelange | 8 | (0) |

International career^{‡}
| 2017 | Ukraine U16 | 3 | (0) |
| 2017–2018 | Ukraine U17 | 9 | (1) |
| 2018 | Ukraine U18 | 1 | (0) |
| 2019 | Ukraine U19 | 2 | (0) |
| 2025– | Syria | 3 | (0) |
- * Club domestic league appearances and goals as of 14 March 2026 ‡ National team caps and goals as of 9 October 2025

Alan Hozanovych Aussi (Ukrainian: Алан Гозанович Ауссі; born 30 June 2001) is a professional footballer who plays as a centre-back. Born in Ukraine, he plays for the Syria national team.

== Career ==
Born in Donetsk, Aussi is a product of the Donetsk Oblast youth sportive schools.

He played for Dynamo Kyiv in the Ukrainian Premier League Reserves and was never promoted to the senior squad team. From 2019 he is playing abroad: in the Czech Republic and in Belarus.

In summer 2022 he moved to Pyunik.

== Personal life ==
His mother is a Ukrainian and his father is a Syrian, who arrived in Ukraine as a student.

== Honours ==
Pyunik

- Armenian Super Cup: 2022
