= Milad Jahani =

Iranian footballer (born 1989)

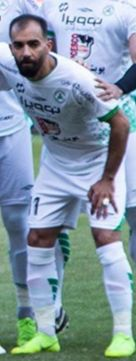
- Jahani with Sepahan in 2022

Personal information
- Date of birth: 26 March 1989 (age 37)
- Place of birth: Sari, Iran
- Height: 1.75 m (5 ft 9 in)
- Position: Midfielder

Team information
- Current team: Saipa
- Number: 11

Youth career
- –2008: Moghavemat Sari

Senior career*
Years	Team	Apps	(Gls)
2008–2010	Moghavemat Sari		
2010–2012	Sanat Sari	10	(8)
2012–2014	Mes Kerman	35	(0)
2014–2015	Gostaresh Foulad	17	(2)
2015–2016	Khooneh be Khooneh	14	(1)
2016–2020	Sanat Naft	91	(11)
2020–2022	Zob Ahan	41	(6)
2022	Sepahan	12	(2)
2022–2023	Malavan	23	(0)
2024	Darya Caspian	14	(7)
2024–	Saipa	18	(1)
- * Club domestic league appearances and goals as of 22 April 2025

Milad Jahani (Persian: میلاد جهانی; born 26 March 1989) is an Iranian football midfielder who plays for Saipa in the Azadegan League.

== Career ==
=== Club ===
On 12 June 2022, Jahani signed for Armenian Premier League club Pyunik on loan.
