= Tarik Isić =

Bosnian association football player

Personal information
- Date of birth: 8 October 1994 (age 32)
- Place of birth: Kiseljak, Bosnia and Herzegovina
- Height: 1.87 m (6 ft 2 in)
- Position: Centre-back

Team information
- Current team: Wuxi Wugo
- Number: 4

Senior career*
Years	Team	Apps	(Gls)
2016–2015	Radnik Hadžići		
2015	Turbina Jablanica		
2015–2016	Čapljina	52	(4)
2016–2017	Olimpik	11	(1)
2017–2018	GOŠK Gabela	9	(0)
2018–2019	Radnik Bijeljina	11	(0)
2019–2020	Čelik Zenica	9	(0)
2020	Perak	0	(0)
2021	Olimpik	10	(0)
2021–2022	Velež Mostar	12	(0)
2022	Kukësi	0	(0)
2023–2024	Sogdiana Jizzakh	23	(2)
2024	Pyunik	5	(0)
2024–2025	Sloboda Tuzla	1	(0)
2025	Nanjing City	23	(1)
2026–	Wuxi Wugo	0	(0)
- * Club domestic league appearances and goals as of 15:03, 25 October 2025 (UTC)

Tarik Isić (born 8 October 1994) is a Bosnian professional footballer who plays as a centre-back for Wuxi Wugo.

== Career ==
In February 2025, Tarik Isić joined the China League One club Nanjing City on a one-year contract. Isić made his debut on 16 March 2025 in a league match against Dalian K'un City, where he also scored in his first game for the club, despite a 1–2 defeat. On 27 January 2026, the club announced his departure after the 2025 season.

On 23 February 2026, Isić joined another China League One club Wuxi Wugo for 2026 season.

== Honours ==
Pyunik

- Armenian Premier League: 2023–24

Velež Mostar

- Bosnian Cup: 2021–22
