= Boris Varga =

Serbian footballer

Personal information
- Date of birth: 14 August 1993 (age 33)
- Place of birth: Vrbas, FR Yugoslavia
- Height: 1.84 m (6 ft 0 in)
- Position: Defender

Team information
- Current team: Bor
- Number: 33

Senior career*
Years	Team	Apps	(Gls)
2010–2013	Hajduk Kula	15	(0)
2010–2011	→ Polet Sivac (loan)		
2013–2014	Inđija	25	(0)
2014–2015	Proleter Novi Sad	19	(0)
2015–2016	ČSK Čelarevo	22	(0)
2016	Napredak Kruševac	6	(0)
2017–2018	OFK Bačka	45	(0)
2018–2022	TSC	83	(1)
2022	Pyunik	6	(0)
2023	Radnički Niš	11	(0)
2023	RFK Novi Sad	12	(0)
2024–2026	Sloga Doboj	49	(2)
2026–	Bor	3	(0)

International career
2012	Serbia U19	1	(0)
- * Club domestic league appearances and goals as of 23 September 2026

Boris Varga (Serbian Cyrillic: Борис Варга; born 14 August 1993) is a Serbian footballer who plays as a defender for Serbian First League club Bor.

== Career ==
On 3 July 2022, Pyunik announced the signing of Varga. On 29 December 2022, Varga left Pyunik.

== Career statistics ==
As of match played 26 April 2026

Appearances and goals by club, season and competition
Club	Season	League			National cup (Note: Includes Serbian Cup, Bosnian Cup)		Continental		Other		Total	
Club	Season	Division	Apps	Goals	Apps	Goals	Apps	Goals	Apps	Goals	Apps	Goals
Hajduk Kula	2010–11	Serbian SuperLiga	1	0	—		—		—		1	0
Hajduk Kula	2011–12	Serbian SuperLiga	4	0	—		—		—		4	0
Hajduk Kula	2012–13	Serbian SuperLiga	10	0	—		—		—		10	0
Hajduk Kula	Total		15	0	—		—		—		15	0
Inđija	2013–14	Serbian First League	25	0	—		—		—		25	0
Proleter Novi Sad	2014–15	Serbian First League	19	0	2	0	—		—		21	0
ČSK Čelarevo	2015–16	Serbian First League	22	0	1	0	—		—		23	0
Napredak Kruševac	2016–17	Serbian SuperLiga	6	0	1	0	—		—		7	0
Bačka	2016–17	Serbian SuperLiga	13	0	—		—		—		13	0
Bačka	2017–18	Serbian SuperLiga	32	0	1	0	—		—		33	0
Bačka	Total		45	0	1	0	—		—		46	0
TSC	2018–19	Serbian First League	12	0	2	0	—		—		14	0
TSC	2019–20	Serbian SuperLiga	26	1	—		—		—		26	1
TSC	2020–21	Serbian SuperLiga	21	0	2	1	1 (Note: Appearance in UEFA Europa League)	0	—		24	1
TSC	2021–22	Serbian SuperLiga	24	0	2	0	—		—		26	0
TSC	Total		83	1	6	1	1	0	—		90	2
Pyunik	2022–23	Armenian Premier League	6	0	—		1	0	—		7	0
Radnički Niš	2022–23	Serbian SuperLiga	11	0	1	0	—		1 (Note: Appearance in the 2022–23 Serbian SuperLiga relegation play-off)	0	13	0
RFK Novi Sad	2023–24	Serbian First League	12	0	1	0	—		—		13	0
Sloga Doboj	2023–24	Bosnian Premier League	15	0	5	1	—		—		20	1
Sloga Doboj	2024–25	Bosnian Premier League	19	2	2	0	—		—		21	2
Sloga Doboj	2025–26	Bosnian Premier League	15	0	1	0	—		—		16	0
Sloga Doboj	2026–27	Bosnian Premier League	0	0	0	0	—		—		0	0
Sloga Doboj	Total		49	2	8	1	—		—		57	3
Career total			293	3	21	2	2	0	1	0	317	5
