= Vagner Gonçalves (Brazilian footballer) =

Brazilian-French footballer

Personal information
- Full name: Vagner Gonçalves Nogueira de Souza
- Date of birth: 27 April 1996 (age 30)
- Place of birth: Alegre, Brazil
- Height: 1.69 m (5 ft 7 in)
- Position: Winger

Team information
- Current team: Teuta
- Number: 23

Youth career
- –2016: Bastia

Senior career*
Years	Team	Apps	(Gls)
2014–2016	Bastia B	30	(8)
2016–2019	Saburtalo Tbilisi	69	(18)
2017–2018	→ Cercle Brugge (loan)	1	(0)
2020	Dinamo Batumi	14	(1)
2021–2022	Dnipro-1	3	(1)
2021–2022	→ Kryvbas Kryvyi Rih (loan)	8	(2)
2022	Dila Gori	17	(8)
2022–2023	Shkëndija	10	(1)
2023–2024	Dinamo Tbilisi	16	(3)
2023–2024	→ Pyunik (loan)	29	(7)
2024–2025	Pyunik	16	(1)
2026–	Teuta	10	(1)
- * Club domestic league appearances and goals as of 13 May 2026

Vagner Gonçalves Nogueira de Souza (born 27 April 1996), commonly known as Vagner Gonçalves, is a Brazilian professional footballer who plays as a winger for Kategoria Superiore club Teuta.

== Career ==
=== Kryvbas Kryvyi Rih ===
In summer 2021 he moved on loan to Kryvbas Kryvyi Rih in Ukrainian First League.

=== Dila Gori ===
In January 2022 he moved to Dila Gori in Erovnuli Liga.

=== Shkëndija ===
In summer 2022, he moved to Macedonian First Football League club Shkëndija.

=== Pyunik ===
On 10 July 2024, Pyunik announced the signing of Gonçalves on loan for the season from Dinamo Tbilisi.

On 14 December 2025, Pyunik announced the departure Gonçalves.

== Career statistics ==
=== Club ===
As of match played 12 July 2022

Appearances and goals by club, season and competition
Club	Season	League			Cup		Continental		Other		Total	
Club	Season	Division	Apps	Goals	Apps	Goals	Apps	Goals	Apps	Goals	Apps	Goals
Bastia B	2014–15	Championnat de France Amateur 2	7	2	0	0	–		–		7	2
Bastia B	2015–16	Championnat de France Amateur 2	23	6	0	0	–		–		23	6
Bastia B	Total		30	8	0	0	–		–		30	8
Saburtalo Tbilisi	2016	Umaglesi Liga	12	2	1 (Note: Appearances in the Georgian Cup)	0	–		–		13	2
Saburtalo Tbilisi	2017	Erovnuli Liga	15	4	1	0	–		–		16	4
Saburtalo Tbilisi	2018	Erovnuli Liga	32	11	0	0	–		–		32	11
Saburtalo Tbilisi	2019	Erovnuli Liga	10	1	0	0	0	0	1 (Note: Appearances in the Georgian Super Cup)	0	11	1
Saburtalo Tbilisi	Total		69	18	2	0	0	0	1	0	72	18
Cercle Brugge (loan)	2017–18	Proximus League	1	0	0	0	–		–		1	0
Dinamo Batumi	2020	Erovnuli Liga	14	1	1	0	0	0	–		15	1
SC Dnipro-1	2020–21	Ukrainian Premier League	3	1	1	0	–		–		4	1
Dila Gori	2022	Erovnuli Liga	17	8	0	0	–		–		17	8
Shkëndija	2022–23	Macedonian First League	0	0	0	0	–		–		0	0
Career total			134	36	4	0	0	0	1	0	139	36

== Honours ==
Pyunik

- Armenian Premier League: 2023–24

Saburtalo Tbilisi

- Erovnuli Liga: 2018
- Georgian Cup: 2019

Cercle Brugge

- Belgian Second Division: 2017–18
