= FC Alashkert in European football =

Overview of FC Alashkert's role in European football

Alashkert in European football
- Club: Alashkert
- Most appearances: Artak Grigoryan (36)
- Top scorer: Uroš Nenadović (4); José Embaló (4)
- First entry: 2015–16 UEFA Europa League
- Latest entry: 2026–27 UEFA Conference League

Alashkert is an Armenian football club based in Yerevan, Armenia.

== History ==
=== 2010's ===
Alashkert first qualified for European competition in 2015, after finishing 4th in 2014–15 Armenian Premier League, qualifying for the First Qualifying Round of the 2015–16 UEFA Europa League where they faced St Johnstone. After eliminating St Johnstone on away goals after winning their first ever European game 1–0 at home, Alashkert where defeated 4–2 over two legs by Kairat in the Second Qualifying Round.

=== Matches ===
Season	Competition	Round	Opponent	Home	Away	Aggregate	Note
2015–16	UEFA Europa League	1Q	(Scotland) St Johnstone	1–0	1–2	2–2 (a)	
2015–16	UEFA Europa League	2Q	(Kazakhstan) Kairat	2–1	0–3	2–4	
2016–17	UEFA Champions League	1Q	(Andorra) Santa Coloma	3–0	0–0	3–0	
2016–17	UEFA Champions League	2Q	(Georgia (country)) Dinamo Tbilisi	1–1	0–2	1–3	
2017–18	UEFA Champions League	1Q	(Andorra) Santa Coloma	1–0	1–1	2–1	
2017–18	UEFA Champions League	2Q	(Belarus) BATE Borisov	1–3	1–1	2–4	
2018–19	UEFA Champions League	1Q	(Scotland) Celtic	0–3	0–3	0–6	
2018–19	UEFA Europa League	2Q	(Montenegro) Sutjeska Nikšić	0–0	1–0	1–0	
2018–19	UEFA Europa League	3Q	(Romania) CFR Cluj	0−2	0–5	0–7	
2019–20	UEFA Europa League	1Q	(North Macedonia) Makedonija GP	3–1	3–0	6–1	
2019–20	UEFA Europa League	2Q	(Romania) FCSB	0−3	3–2	3–5	
2020–21	UEFA Europa League	1Q	(North Macedonia) Renova	0−1	—N/a	0–1	
2021–22	UEFA Champions League	1Q	(Wales) Connah's Quay Nomads	1–0 (a.e.t.)	2–2	3–2	
2021–22	UEFA Champions League	2Q	(Moldova) Sheriff Tiraspol	0−1	1−3	1–4	
2021–22	UEFA Europa League	3Q	(Kazakhstan) Kairat	3–2 (a.e.t.)	0–0	3−2	
2021–22	UEFA Europa League	PO	(Scotland) Rangers	0–0	0–1	0–1	
2021–22	UEFA Europa Conference League	GS	(Austria) LASK	0–3	0–2	4th place	
2021–22	UEFA Europa Conference League	GS	(Israel) Maccabi Tel Aviv	1–1	1–4	4th place	
2021–22	UEFA Europa Conference League	GS	(Finland) HJK	2–4	0–1	4th place	
2022–23	UEFA Europa Conference League	1Q	(Malta) Ħamrun Spartans	1–0	1–4	2–4	
2023–24	UEFA Europa Conference League	1Q	(Montenegro) Arsenal Tivat	1–1	6–1	7–2	
2023–24	UEFA Europa Conference League	2Q	(Hungary) Debrecen	0–1	2–1	2–2 (1-3 p)	
2026–27	UEFA Conference League	1Q	(Kazakhstan) Yelimay	1–1	2–2	3–3 (5–6 p)	
2026–27	UEFA Conference League	2Q	(Romania) CFR Cluj	1–1	1–4	2–4	

== Player statistics ==
=== Appearances ===
As of match played 30 July 2026

	Name	Years	UEFA Champions League	UEFA Europa League	UEFA Europa Conference League	Total	Ratio
1	(Armenia) Artak Grigoryan	2015–2023	12 (0)	17 (0)	7 (0)	36 (0)	0
2	(Armenia) Artak Yedigaryan	2015-2019; 2021–2024	13 (0)	7 (0)	9 (2)	29 (2)	0.07
3	(Armenia) Taron Voskanyan	2018–2024	6 (0)	12 (1)	10 (0)	28 (1)	0.04
4	(Armenia) Ognjen Čančarević (Note: Čančarević was born in the SFR Yugoslavia, but went on to represent Armenia at international level.)	2018–Present	4 (0)	13 (0)	10 (0)	27 (0)	0
5	(Brazil) Tiago Cametá	2019-2022	0 (4)	0 (9)	0 (8)	21 (0)	0
6	(Russia) David Khurtsidze	2021-2022, 2023-2024	4 (2)	4 (0)	10 (0)	18 (2)	0.11
7	(Brazil) James	2021-2022	0 (4)	0 (4)	0 (7)	15 (0)	0
8	(Serbia) Uroš Nenadović	2017-2019; 2023	6 (3)	8 (1)	(-)	14 (4)	0.29
8	(Ivory Coast) Didier Kadio	2021-2022	4 (0)	3 (0)	7 (0)	14 (0)	0
8	(Armenia) Rumyan Hovsepyan	2021-2022; 2022	4 (0)	4 (0)	6 (0)	14 (0)	0
11	(Armenia) Mihran Manasyan	2015-2020	7 (0)	6 (1)	0 (0)	13 (1)	0.08
11	(Armenia) Gagik Daghbashyan	2017-2020; 2022	6 (0)	7 (0)	0 (0)	13 (1)	0
11	(Bosnia and Herzegovina) Aleksandar Glišić	2019-2021	4 (1)	5 (1)	4 (1)	13 (3)	0.23
11	(Guinea-Bissau) José Embaló (Note: Embaló was born in Portugal, but went on to represent Guinea-Bissau at international level.)	2021	4 (0)	3 (2)	6 (2)	13 (4)	0.31
11	(France) Vincent Bezecourt	2021	3 (1)	4 (4)	6 (6)	13 (1)	0.08
16	(Armenia) Artur Yedigaryan	2016-2019; 2019	8 (1)	4 (0)	(-)	12 (1)	0.08
17	(Armenia) Khoren Veranyan	2015-2018	7 (0)	4 (0)	0 (0)	11 (0)	0
17	(Armenia) Vahagn Minasyan	2013-2018	7 (1)	4 (0)	0 (0)	11 (1)	0.09
17	(Armenia) Artak Dashyan	2016-2019	10 (0)	1 (0)	(-)	11 (0)	0
17	(Russia) Nikita Tankov	2019-2022	4 (0)	7 (1)	0 (0)	11 (1)	0.09
17	(Namibia) Wangu Gome	2020-2022	2 (0)	4 (0)	5 (0)	11 (0)	0
17	(Montenegro) Dejan Boljević	2021	2 (0)	4 (0)	5 (1)	11 (1)	0.09
23	(Serbia) Danilo Sekulić	2019-2020	2 (0)	7 (1)	(-)	9 (1)	0.11
23	(Armenia) Aghvan Papikyan	2021	2 (0)	3 (0)	4 (0)	9 (0)	0
25	(Armenia) Gevorg Kasparov	2015-2017	4 (0)	4 (0)	0 (0)	8 (0)	0
25	(Armenia) Norayr Gyozalyan	2014-2016	4 (2)	4 (1)	0 (0)	8 (3)	0.38
25	(Armenia) Arsen Beglaryan	2016-2018, 2025-Present	4 (0)	0 (0)	4 (0)	8 (0)	0
28	(Armenia) Gevorg Poghosyan	2015-2016	3 (0)	4 (0)	0 (0)	7 (0)	0
28	(Armenia) Karen Muradyan	2015-2016	4 (0)	3 (0)	0 (0)	7 (0)	0
28	(Armenia) Andranik Voskanyan	2015-2016	6 (0)	1 (0)	0 (0)	7 (0)	0
28	(Serbia) Danijel Stojković	2017-2019	4 (0)	3 (0)	0 (0)	7 (0)	0
32	(Armenia) Ararat Arakelyan	2015-2016; 2017-2018	2 (0)	4 (1)	0 (0)	6 (1)	0.17
32	(Slovakia) Oliver Práznovský	2018	2 (0)	4 (0)	0 (0)	6 (0)	0
32	(Brazil) Thiago Galvão	2019-2021; 2022–2023	(-)	4 (2)	2 (0)	6 (2)	0.33
32	(Russia) Vladislav Kryuchkov	2021	0 (0)	1 (0)	5 (0)	6 (0)	0
32	(Serbia) Branko Mihajlović	2021-2022	2 (0)	1 (0)	3 (0)	6 (0)	0
32	(Armenia) Karen Nalbandyan	2023–2024, 2025–Present	(-)	(-)	6 (0)	6 (0)	0
38	(Armenia) Aram Bareghamyan	2015-2016	1 (0)	4 (0)	0 (0)	5 (0)	0
38	(Serbia) Mladen Zeljković	2016-2019	2 (0)	3 (1)	(-)	5 (1)	0.2
38	(Brazil) Gustavo Marmentini	2018-2020	(-)	2 (5)	(-)	2 (5)	0.4
38	(Brazil) Jefferson	2018-2019	2 (0)	3 (0)	(-)	5 (0)	0
38	(Serbia) Marko Milinković	2021-2022	0 (0)	0 (0)	5 (0)	5 (0)	0
43	(Mali) Sékou Fofana	2015-2016	0 (0)	4 (0)	0 (0)	4 (0)	0
43	(Brazil) Héber	2015-2016	0 (0)	4 (1)	0 (0)	4 (1)	0.25
43	(Belarus) Sergey Usenya	2015-2016	0 (0)	4 (0)	0 (0)	4 (0)	0
43	(Armenia) Grigor Hovhannisyan	2015-2016	0 (0)	4 (0)	0 (0)	4 (0)	0
43	(Serbia) Aleksandar Tasić	2016	4 (0)	0 (0)	(-)	4 (0)	0
43	(Ukraine) Dmytro Khovbosha	2016-2017	4 (0)	0 (0)	(-)	4 (0)	0
43	(Armenia) Artyom Simonyan	2017-2018	2 (0)	2 (0)	0 (0)	4 (0)	0
43	(United States) César Romero	2018	2 (0)	2 (0)	0 (0)	4 (0)	0
43	(Armenia) Vahagn Hayrapetyan	2019-2020	0 (0)	4 (0)	0 (0)	4 (0)	0
43	(Armenia) Hayk Ishkhanyan	2014-2015; 2019-2020; 2020	0 (0)	4 (0)	0 (0)	4 (0)	0
43	(Armenia) Hrayr Mkoyan	2018-2019	0 (0)	4 (0)	0 (0)	4 (0)	0
43	(Armenia) David Yurchenko (Note: Yurchenko was born in the Turkmen SSR, but went on to represent Armenia at international level.)	2015-2016	2 (0)	0 (0)	2 (0)	4 (0)	0
43	(Brazil) Nixon	2021	0 (0)	0 (0)	4 (0)	4 (0)	0
43	(Armenia) David Davidyan (Note: Davidyan was born in Russia, but went on to represent Armenia at international level.)	2020-2021	4 (0)	0 (0)	0 (0)	4 (0)	0
43	(Armenia) Wbeymar (Note: Wbeymar was born in the Colombia, but went on to represent Armenia at international level.)	2023–2024	(-)	(-)	4 (0)	4 (0)	0
43	(Armenia) Yuri Gareginyan	2023–2024	(-)	(-)	4 (0)	4 (0)	0
43	(Venezuela) Robinson Flores	2023	(-)	(-)	4 (0)	4 (0)	0
43	(Venezuela) Daniel Carrillo	2023–2024	(-)	(-)	4 (0)	4 (0)	0
43	(Guinea-Bissau) Mimito Biai	2023–2024	(-)	(-)	4 (0)	4 (1)	0.25
43	(Ecuador) Yeison Racines	2023–2024	(-)	(-)	4 (1)	4 (1)	0.25
43	(Russia) Vitali Ustinov	2023–2024	(-)	(-)	4 (2)	4 (2)	0.5
43	(Brazil) Agdon	2023–2024	(-)	(-)	4 (3)	4 (3)	0.75
43	(Croatia) Mateo Mužek	2023	(-)	(-)	4 (0)	4 (0)	0
43	(Brazil) Cézar	2026-Present	0 (0)	0 (0)	4 (0)	4 (0)	0
43	(Russia) Yaroslav Matyukhin	2025-Present	0 (0)	0 (0)	4 (0)	4 (0)	0
43	(Armenia) Davit Terteryan	2025-Present	0 (0)	0 (0)	4 (1)	4 (1)	0.25
43	(Armenia) Edgar Piloyan	2025-Present	0 (0)	0 (0)	4 (0)	4 (0)	0
43	(Armenia) Arsen Sadoyan	2025-Present	0 (0)	0 (0)	4 (0)	4 (0)	0
43	(Armenia) Hakob Hakobyan	2026-Present	0 (0)	0 (0)	4 (0)	4 (0)	0
43	(Zambia) Joseph Banda	2026-Present	0 (0)	0 (0)	4 (0)	4 (0)	0
43	(Brazil) Rafael Jesus	2026-Present	0 (0)	0 (0)	4 (1)	4 (1)	0.25
43	(Nigeria) Olawale Farayola	2025-Present	0 (0)	0 (0)	3 (0)	4 (0)	0
43	(Guinea) Momo Touré	2025-Present	0 (0)	0 (0)	3 (1)	4 (1)	0.25
43	(Republic of the Congo) Domi Massoumou	2026-Present	0 (0)	0 (0)	4 (0)	4 (0)	0
43	(Nigeria) Philip Ejike	2026-Present	0 (0)	0 (0)	4 (0)	4 (0)	0
78	(Armenia) Rafael Ghazaryan	2015-2016	2 (0)	1 (0)	0 (0)	3 (0)	0
78	(Ukraine) Anton Savin	2016-2017	3 (0)	0 (0)	(-)	3 (0)	0
78	(Armenia) Edgar Manucharyan	2018-2019; 2020	0 (0)	3 (0)	0 (0)	3 (0)	0
78	(Armenia) Sargis Shahinyan	2018-2019; 2019-2020; 2022–2023	0 (0)	2 (0)	1 (0)	3 (0)	0
78	(Ivory Coast) Béko Fofana	2021–2022	0 (0)	1 (0)	2 (0)	3 (0)	0
78	(Armenia) Grigor Aghekyan	2020-2021	1 (0)	2 (0)	0 (0)	3 (0)	0
78	(Ghana) Annan Mensah	2022–2024	(-)	(-)	3 (1)	3 (1)	0.33
78	(Georgia (country)) Levan Kutalia	2023	(-)	(-)	3 (0)	3 (0)	0
86	(Armenia) Aram Hovsepyan	2015-2016	0 (0)	2 (0)	0 (0)	2 (0)	0
86	(Armenia) Samvel Melkonyan	2016-2017	2 (0)	0 (0)	(-)	2 (0)	0
86	(Armenia) Zaven Badoyan	2017-2018	2 (0)	0 (0)	0 (0)	2 (0)	0
86	(Serbia) Miljan Jablan	2017	2 (0)	0 (0)	0 (0)	2 (0)	0
86	(Trinidad and Tobago) Lester Peltier	2017; 2018	2 (0)	0 (0)	0 (0)	2 (0)	0
86	(Armenia) Goran Antonić	2018-2019	0 (0)	2 (0)	0 (0)	2 (0)	0
86	(Armenia) Gegham Kadymyan	2019	0 (0)	2 (0)	0 (0)	2 (0)	0
86	(Brazil) Matheus Alessandro	2021	0 (0)	0 (0)	2 (0)	2 (0)	0
86	(Armenia) Aleksandr Karapetyan	2022	0 (0)	0 (0)	2 (0)	2 (0)	0
86	(Armenia) Sargis Metoyan	2022-2023	0 (0)	0 (0)	2 (0)	2 (0)	0
86	(Armenia) Benik Hovhannisyan	2022	0 (0)	0 (0)	2 (0)	2 (0)	0
86	(Colombia) Bladimir Díaz	2022	0 (0)	0 (0)	2 (0)	2 (0)	0
86	(Armenia) Serob Grigoryan	2023–2024	(-)	(-)	2 (1)	2 (1)	0.5
86	(Nigeria) Sodiq Fatai	2023–2024	(-)	(-)	2 (0)	2 (0)	0
86	(Mali) Daouda Togola	2026-Present	0 (0)	0 (0)	2 (0)	2 (0)	0
86	(Armenia) Robert Hakobyan	2025-Present	0 (0)	0 (0)	2 (0)	2 (0)	0
86	(Nigeria) Hussein Muiz Adebayo	2026-Present	0 (0)	0 (0)	2 (0)	2 (0)	0
86	(Colombia) Jefferson Granado	2026-Present	0 (0)	0 (0)	2 (0)	2 (0)	0
104	(Armenia) Gevorg Karapetyan	2015-2016	0 (0)	1 (0)	0 (0)	1 (0)	0
104	(Georgia (country)) Irakli Kvekveskiri	2016-2017	1 (0)	0 (0)	(-)	1 (0)	0
104	(Armenia) Artur Avagyan	2016-2017	1 (0)	0 (0)	(-)	1 (0)	0
104	(Ukraine) Artur Avahimyan	2019	0 (0)	1 (0)	0 (0)	1 (0)	0
104	(Armenia) Vardan Pogosyan	2019	0 (0)	1 (0)	0 (0)	1 (0)	0
104	(Senegal) Pape Camara	2020-2021	0 (0)	1 (0)	0 (0)	1 (0)	0
104	(North Macedonia) Risto Mitrevski	2020; 2021	0 (0)	1 (0)	0 (0)	1 (0)	0
104	(Brazil) Bryan	2020-2021	0 (0)	1 (0)	0 (0)	1 (0)	0
104	(Ukraine) Ihor Honchar	2020	0 (0)	1 (0)	0 (0)	1 (0)	0
104	(Brazil) Perdigão	2020	0 (0)	1 (0)	0 (0)	1 (0)	0
104	(Armenia) Eduard Avagyan	2019-2020	0 (0)	1 (0)	0 (0)	1 (0)	0
104	(Colombia) Fáider Burbano	2022-2023	0 (0)	0 (0)	1 (0)	1 (0)	0
104	(Colombia) Ifeanyi Nduka	2025-Present	0 (0)	0 (0)	1 (0)	1 (0)	0

=== Goalscorers ===
As of match played 30 July 2026

	Name	Years	UEFA Champions League	UEFA Europa League	UEFA Europa Conference League	Total	Ratio
1	(Serbia) Uroš Nenadović	2017-2019; 2023	3 (6)	1 (8)	(-)	4 (14)	0.29
1	(Guinea-Bissau) José Embaló	2021	0 (4)	2 (3)	2 (6)	4 (13)	0.31
3	(Armenia) Norayr Gyozalyan	2014-2016	2 (4)	1 (4)	(-)	3 (8)	0.38
3	(Bosnia and Herzegovina) Aleksandar Glišić	2019-2021	1 (4)	1 (5)	1 (4)	3 (13)	0.23
3	(Brazil) Agdon	2023–2024	(-)	(-)	3 (4)	3 (4)	0.75
3	Own goals	2015–Present	1 (14)	1 (17)	1 (16)	3 (47)	0.06
7	(Brazil) Thiago Galvão	2019-2021; 2022–2023	(-)	2 (4)	0 (2)	2 (6)	0.33
7	(Brazil) Gustavo Marmentini	2018-2020	(-)	2 (5)	(-)	2 (5)	0.4
7	(Russia) David Khurtsidze	2021-2022	2 (4)	0 (4)	0 (6)	2 (14)	0.14
7	(Armenia) Artak Yedigaryan	2015-2019; 2021–2024	0 (13)	0 (7)	2 (9)	2 (29)	0.07
7	(Russia) Vitali Ustinov	2023–2024	(-)	(-)	2 (4)	2 (4)	0.5
12	(Armenia) Mihran Manasyan	2012-2018; 2019-2020; 2021	0 (7)	1 (6)	(-)	1 (13)	0.08
12	(Armenia) Ararat Arakelyan	2014-2018	0 (2)	1 (4)	(-)	1 (6)	0.17
12	(Brazil) Héber	2015-2016	(-)	1 (4)	(-)	1 (4)	0.25
12	(Armenia) Vahagn Minasyan	2013-2018	1 (7)	0 (4)	(-)	1 (11)	0.09
12	(Armenia) Artur Yedigaryan	2016-2019; 2019	1 (8)	0 (4)	(-)	1 (12)	0.08
12	(Serbia) Mladen Zeljković	2016-2019	0 (2)	1 (3)	(-)	1 (5)	0.2
12	(Armenia) Taron Voskanyan	2018–2024	0 (6)	1 (12)	0 (10)	1 (28)	0.04
12	(Russia) Nikita Tankov	2019-2022	0 (4)	1 (7)	0 (0)	1 (11)	0.09
12	(Serbia) Danilo Sekulić	2019-2020	0 (2)	1 (7)	(-)	1 (9)	0.11
12	(France) Vincent Bezecourt	2021	1 (3)	0 (4)	0 (6)	1 (13)	0.08
12	(Montenegro) Dejan Boljević	2021	0 (2)	0 (4)	1 (5)	1 (11)	0.09
12	(Ecuador) Yeison Racines	2023–2024	(-)	(-)	1 (4)	1 (4)	0.25
12	(Armenia) Serob Grigoryan	2023–2024	(-)	(-)	1 (2)	1 (2)	0.5
12	(Ghana) Annan Mensah	2022–2024	(-)	(-)	1 (3)	1 (3)	0.33
12	(Guinea-Bissau) Mimito Biai	2023–2024	(-)	(-)	1 (4)	1 (4)	0.25
12	(Armenia) Davit Terteryan	2025–Present	(-)	(-)	1 (4)	1 (4)	0.25
12	(Armenia) Momo Touré	2025–Present	(-)	(-)	1 (4)	1 (4)	0.25
12	(Brazil) Rafael Jesus	2026-Present	0 (0)	0 (0)	1 (4)	1 (4)	0.25

=== Clean sheets ===
As of match played 30 July 2026

	Name	Years	UEFA Champions League	UEFA Europa League	UEFA Conference League	Total	Ratio
1	(Armenia) Ognjen Čančarević	2018–Present	0 (4)	3 (13)	0 (10)	3 (27)	0.11
2	(Armenia) Gevorg Kasparov	2015-2017	1 (4)	1 (4)	(-)	2 (8)	0.25
3	(Armenia) Arsen Beglaryan	2016-2018, 2025-Present	1 (4)	(-)	0 (4)	1 (8)	0.13
3	(Armenia) David Yurchenko	2021-2022	1 (2)	0 (0)	0 (2)	1 (4)	0.25

== Overall record ==
=== By competition ===
As of match played 30 July 2026

Competition	GP	W	D	L	GF	GA	+/-
UEFA Champions League	14	3	5	6	12	20	–8
UEFA Europa League	17	7	3	7	17	23	–6
UEFA Conference League	16	3	5	8	19	30	-11
Total	47	13	13	21	48	73	−25

=== By country ===
As of match played 30 July 2026

Country	Pld	W	D	L	GF	GA	GD	Win%
Andorra	4	2	2	0	5	1	+4	50.00
Austria	2	0	0	2	0	5	−5	0.00
Belarus	2	0	1	1	2	4	−2	0.00
Finland	2	0	0	2	2	5	−3	0.00
Georgia	2	0	1	1	1	3	−2	0.00
Hungary	2	1	0	1	2	2	+0	50.00
Israel	2	0	1	1	2	5	−3	0.00
Kazakhstan	6	2	3	1	8	9	−1	33.33
Malta	1	1	0	0	1	0	+1	100.00
Moldova	2	0	0	2	1	4	−3	0.00
Montenegro	4	2	2	0	8	2	+6	50.00
North Macedonia	3	2	0	1	6	2	+4	66.67
Romania	6	1	1	4	4	16	−12	16.67
Scotland	6	1	1	4	2	9	−7	16.67
Wales	2	1	1	0	3	2	+1	50.00

=== By club ===
As of match played 30 July 2026

Opponent	Played	Won	Drawn	Lost	For	Against	Difference	Ratio
(Andorra) Santa Coloma	4	2	2	0	5	1	+4	50.00
(Austria) LASK	2	0	0	2	0	5	−5	0.00
(Belarus) BATE Borisov	2	0	1	1	2	4	−2	0.00
(Finland) HJK	2	0	0	2	2	5	−3	0.00
(Georgia (country)) Dinamo Tbilisi	2	0	1	1	1	3	−2	0.00
(Hungary) Debreceni	2	1	0	1	2	2	+0	50.00
(Israel) Maccabi Tel Aviv	2	0	1	1	2	5	−3	0.00
(Kazakhstan) Kairat	4	2	1	1	5	6	−1	50.00
(Kazakhstan) Yelimay	2	0	2	0	3	3	+0	0.00
(Malta) Ħamrun Spartans	1	1	0	0	1	0	+1	100.00
(Moldova) Sheriff Tiraspol	2	0	0	2	1	4	−3	0.00
(Montenegro) Arsenal Tivat	2	1	1	0	7	2	+5	50.00
(Montenegro) Sutjeska Nikšić	2	1	1	0	1	0	+1	50.00
(North Macedonia) Makedonija GP	2	2	0	0	6	1	+5	100.00
(North Macedonia) Renova	1	0	0	1	0	1	−1	0.00
(Romania) CFR Cluj	4	0	1	3	1	11	−10	0.00
(Romania) FCSB	2	1	0	1	3	5	−2	50.00
(Scotland) Celtic	2	0	0	2	0	6	−6	0.00
(Scotland) Rangers	2	0	1	1	0	1	−1	0.00
(Scotland) St Johnstone	2	1	0	1	2	2	+0	50.00
(Wales) Connah's Quay Nomads	2	1	1	0	3	2	+1	50.00
