= 2018–19 FC Alashkert season =

Alashkert
2018-19 season
- Chairman: Bagrat Navoyan
- Manager: Varuzhan Sukiasyan (until 21 September)
- Stadium: Alashkert Stadium
- Premier League: 4th
- Armenian Cup: Winners
- Armenian Supercup: Champions
- Champions League: First qualifying round vs Celtic
- Europa League: Third qualifying round vs CFR Cluj
- Top goalscorer: League: Uroš Nenadović (6); All: Uroš Nenadović (6)

The 2018–19 season was Alashkert's seventh season in the Armenian Premier League and twelfth overall. Alashkert were defending Premier League champions, having won the title the previous three seasons. Domestically, Alashkert finished the season in fourth place, whilst winning the Armenian Cup and Armenian Supercup for the first time in their history, earning themselves qualification to the UEFA Europa League for the 2019–20 season. In Europe, Alashkert were knocked out of the Champions League by Celtic in the first qualifying round, and by CFR Cluj in the third qualifying round in the Europa League.

== Season events ==
On 7 July, Alashkert announced the permanent signings of Goran Antonić, César Romero, Oliver Práznovský, Jefferson and the loan signing of Gustavo Marmentini.

Alashkert began their season by hosting Celtic at the Republican Stadium in the first qualifying round of the UEFA Champions League on 10 July. Goals from Odsonne Edouard, James Forrest and Callum McGregor, gave Celtic a 3–0 victory. The following week, 18 July, Alashkert traveled to Celtic Park to face Celtic in the second leg of their Champions League tie. Despite a first half sending off for Jozo Šimunović, two goals from Moussa Dembélé and one from James Forrest gave Celtic another 3–0 win and a 6–0 aggregate victory.

On 30 July, Alashkert announced the return of Lester Peltier to the club from Banants, however on 3 September, Peltier's contract was terminated by mutual consent in order to enable Peltier to join Saudi Arabian club Al-Mujazzal.

On 21 September 2018, Varuzhan Sukiasyan was fired as manager with Owner Bagrat Navoyan, and Alashkert-2 manager Sergey Erzrumyan taking temporary charge.

== Squad ==
As of 5 March 2019

Note: Flags indicate national team as defined under FIFA eligibility rules; some limited exceptions apply. Players may hold more than one non-FIFA nationality.

No.	Pos.	Nation	Player
1	GK	ARM	Henri Avagyan
2	MF	BRA	Gustavo Marmentini (loan from Atlético Paranaense-B)
3	DF	ARM	Taron Voskanyan
4	DF	SRB	Mladen Zeljković
5	DF	SRB	Danijel Stojković
6	DF	SRB	Goran Antonić
7	DF	ARM	Levon Hayrapetyan
8	DF	ARM	Gagik Daghbashyan
9	MF	CHI	Gerson Acevedo
10	FW	ARM	Edgar Manucharyan
11	MF	ARM	Ghukas Poghosyan
12	MF	SRB	Danilo Sekulić (loan from Debreceni)
13	DF	RUS	Denis Tumasyan

No.	Pos.	Nation	Player
14	FW	BRA	Gláucio
15	FW	SRB	Uroš Nenadović
17	MF	ARM	Artak Yedigaryan
18	MF	BRA	Jefferson
19	FW	RUS	Aleksandr Prudnikov
20	MF	ARM	Artur Yedigaryan (captain)
21	MF	ARM	Artak Grigoryan
22	DF	ARM	Hrayr Mkoyan
55	GK	SRB	Ognjen Čančarević
93	GK	ARM	Vladimir Allahverdyan
—	MF	ARM	Artak Dashyan
—	MF	CIV	Joël Damahou
—	FW	RUS	Nikita Tankov

== Transfers ==
=== In ===
Date	Position	Nationality	Name	From	Fee	Ref.
13 June 2018	GK	(Armenia)	Henri Avagyan	Banants	Undisclosed	
13 June 2018	MF	(Armenia)	Sargis Shahinyan	Montana	Undisclosed	
30 July 2018	DF	(Armenia)	Levon Hayrapetyan	Pyunik	Undisclosed	
25 July 2018	FW	(Armenia)	Edgar Manucharyan	Ural Yekaterinburg	Undisclosed	
24 August 2018	DF	(Armenia)	Hrayr Mkoyan	Ararat-Armenia	Undisclosed	
30 July 2018	MF	(Armenia)	Ghukas Poghosyan	Gorodeya	Undisclosed	
7 July 2018	DF	(Serbia)	Goran Antonić	Unattached	Free	
7 July 2018	DF	(Slovakia)	Oliver Práznovský	Senica	Undisclosed	
7 July 2018	MF	(Brazil)	Jefferson	Operário	Undisclosed	
7 July 2018	FW	(United States)	César Romero	Unattached	Free	
30 July 2018	FW	(Trinidad and Tobago)	Lester Peltier	Banants	Undisclosed	
27 January 2019	DF	(Russia)	Denis Tumasyan	Ufa	Undisclosed	
30 January 2019	FW	(Brazil)	Gláucio	Dunav Ruse	Undisclosed	
20 February 2019	FW	(Russia)	Aleksandr Prudnikov	Spartaks Jūrmala	Undisclosed	
28 February 2019	FW	(Russia)	Nikita Tankov	Dnepr Smolensk	Undisclosed	
3 March 2019	MF	(Chile)	Gerson Acevedo	Sūduva	Undisclosed	
5 March 2019	MF	(Ivory Coast)	Joël Damahou	Hapoel Acre	Undisclosed	

=== Loans in ===
Date from	Position	Nationality	Name	From	Date to	Ref.
22 June 2018	MF	(Serbia)	Danilo Sekulić	Debreceni	End of season	
7 July 2018	MF	(Brazil)	Gustavo Marmentini	Atlético Paranaense-B	End of season	

=== Out ===
Date	Position	Nationality	Name	To	Fee	Ref.
20 January 2019	MF	(Armenia)	Benik Hovhannisyan	Artsakh	Undisclosed	

=== Released ===
Date	Position	Nationality	Name	Joined	Date	Ref.
6 July 2018	DF	(Croatia)	Dino Škvorc	Honvéd	3 September 2018	
30 July 2018	FW	(Armenia)	Mihran Manasyan	Gandzasar Kapan	11 August 2018	
28 August 2018	DF	(Slovakia)	Oliver Práznovský	ViOn Zlaté Moravce		
3 September 2018	FW	(Trinidad and Tobago)	Lester Peltier	Al-Mujazzal	3 September 2018	
30 November 2018	MF	(Armenia)	Artem Simonyan	Ararat Yerevan	3 December 2018	
1 December 2018	FW	(United States)	César Romero	San Diego Sockers	25 November 2019	
7 December 2018	DF	(Armenia)	Andranik Voskanyan	Banants	6 February 2019	
7 December 2018	FW	(Armenia)	Razmik Hakobyan	Ararat Yerevan	7 December 2018	
11 February 2019	MF	(Armenia)	Sargis Shahinyan	Ararat Yerevan	13 February 2019	
1 March 2019	MF	(Armenia)	Artak Dashyan	Urartu	13 June 2019	
5 June 2019	DF	(Armenia)	Levon Hayrapetyan	SV Grün-Weiß Beckedorf		
5 June 2019	DF	(Serbia)	Goran Antonić	TSC		
5 June 2019	MF	(Armenia)	Artak Yedigaryan	Pyunik		
5 June 2019	MF	(Armenia)	Artur Yedigaryan	Proleter Novi Sad		
5 June 2019	MF	(Ivory Coast)	Joël Damahou	Othellos Athienou	27 July 2019	
5 June 2019	FW	(Armenia)	Edgar Manucharyan	Pyunik	6 June 2019	
5 June 2019	FW	(Russia)	Aleksandr Prudnikov	Vitebsk		
30 June 2019	DF	(Armenia)	Aram Shakhnazaryan	Lokomotiv Yerevan		
30 June 2019	DF	(Russia)	Denis Tumasyan	Chayka Peschanokopskoye		
30 June 2019	DF	(Serbia)	Danijel Stojković	Neman Grodno		
30 June 2019	MF	(Armenia)	Artak Dashyan	Banants	13 June 2019	
30 June 2019	MF	(Brazil)	Jefferson	Machine Sazi		
30 June 2019	MF	(Chile)	Gerson Acevedo	Deportes Recoleta	11 March 2020	
30 June 2019	FW	(Armenia)	Vardan Pogosyan	Gandzasar Kapan	13 September 2019	
30 June 2019	FW	(Brazil)	Gláucio	Nova Iguaçu		
30 June 2019	FW	(Serbia)	Uroš Nenadović	AC Horsens	14 August 2019	

== Competitions ==
=== Armenian Supercup ===
29 July 2018	Alashkert	2 – 0	Gandzasar Kapan	Yerevan
18:00 (UTC+4)	Poghosyan 17'; Romero (yellow card) 36'; Marmentini 38'; R.Hakobyan (yellow card) 74'; H.Avagyan (yellow card) 75'; A.Hambartsumyan (yellow card) 63' (yellow-red card) 88'	Report	Wbeymar (yellow card) 76' (yellow-red card) 90'; Sverchinskiy (yellow card) 81'	Stadium: Vazgen Sargsyan Republican Stadium; Attendance: 700; Referee: Suren Baliyan

=== Armenian Premier League ===
==== Results summary ====
Overall								Home						Away					
Pld	W	D	L	GF	GA	GD	Pts	W	D	L	GF	GA	GD	W	D	L	GF	GA	GD
32	15	6	11	37	27	+10	51	10	1	5	23	12	+11	5	5	6	14	15	−1

Last updated: 30 May 2019.
Source: See Results

==== Results ====
5 August 2018 1	Ararat Yerevan	0 – 1	Alashkert	Yerevan
17:00 (UTC+4)	S.Mkrtchyan (yellow card) 53'; R.Avagyan (yellow card) 54'; V.Chopuryan (yellow card) 67'; V.Arzoyan (yellow card) 67'; G.Poghosyan (yellow card) 75'	Report	Simonyan (yellow card) 48'; Stojković 58'; Poghosyan (yellow card) 66'; Arta.Yedigaryan (yellow card) 70'	Stadium: Alashkert Stadium; Attendance: 500; Referee: Gevorg Eghoyan

12 August 2018 2	Alashkert	–	Pyunik	Yerevan
17:00 (UTC+4)				Stadium: Alashkert Stadium

19 August 2018 3	Gandzasar Kapan	0 – 1	Alashkert	Yerevan
19:00 (UTC+4)	Yuspashyan (yellow card) 58'; V.Pogosyan (yellow card) 67'; Sverchinskiy (yellow card) 77'; M.Grigoryan (yellow card) 83'	Report	Dashyan 39'; Práznovský (yellow card) 83'; Zeljković (yellow card) 90+2'	Stadium: Yerevan Football Academy Stadium; Attendance: 100

26 August 2018 4	Alashkert	1 – 3	Ararat-Armenia	Yerevan
16:00 (UTC+4)	Manucharyan 4' (pen.); Grigoryan (yellow card) 53'; Stojković (yellow card) 88'	Report	Dimitrov 6' (pen.); Khozin 14' (yellow card) 78'; Kobyalko 37'; Damčevski (yellow card) 47'; Abakumov (yellow card) 62'; Hovhannisyan (yellow card) 70'	Stadium: Alashkert Stadium; Attendance: 300; Referee: Artur Simonyan

29 August 2018 5	Shirak	0 – 0	Alashkert	Gyumri
14:00 (UTC+4)	R.Misakyan (yellow card) 73'	Report	Jefferson (yellow card) 78'	Stadium: Gyumri City Stadium; Attendance: 400; Referee: Suren Baliyan

1 September 2018 6	Alashkert	6 – 0	Artsakh	Yerevan
16:00 (UTC+4)	H.Asoyan 2' (o.g.); Poghosyan 15'; Arta.Yedigaryan 49' (pen.), 79', 81'; Nenadović 65'	Report	E.Nazaryan (yellow card) 40'	Stadium: Alashkert Stadium; Attendance: 150; Referee: Artur Safaryan

16 September 2018 7	Banants	1 – 0	Alashkert	Yerevan
16:00 (UTC+4)	Udo (yellow card) 49'; A.Abdullahi 68'; Ayrapetyan (yellow card) 82'	Report	Stojković (yellow card) 80'	Stadium: Banants Stadium; Attendance: 600; Referee: Artur Simonyan

19 September 2018 2	Alashkert	1 – 2	Pyunik	Yerevan
15:00 (UTC+4)	Grigoryan (yellow card) 19' (yellow-red card) 72'; Yedigaryan (yellow card) 43'; Poghosyan 63' (pen.) (yellow card) 81'; T.Voskanyan (yellow card) 84'	Report	Stezhko (yellow card) 7' (yellow-red card) 45+1'; Avetisyan 16' (yellow card) 82'; Zhestokov 74'; Dragojević (yellow card) 90+4'	Stadium: Alashkert Stadium; Attendance: 400; Referee: Zaven Hovhannisyan

22 September 2018 8	Alashkert	2 – 1	Lori	Yerevan
16:00 (UTC+4)	Jefferson 65', 69' (yellow card) 70'; Zeljković (yellow card) 87'; T.Voskanyan (yellow card) 90+3'	Report	Sunday 23' (yellow card) 85'; N.Antwi (yellow card) 45' (yellow-red card) 61'; I.Fuseini (yellow card) 72'	Stadium: Alashkert Stadium; Attendance: 500; Referee: Artur Simonyan

30 September 2018 9	Alashkert	2 – 1	Ararat Yerevan	Yerevan
15:00 (UTC+4)	Nenadović 25', 78'; Grigoryan (yellow card) 27'; Marmentini (yellow card) 65'	Report	A.Kocharyan 67'; Malyaka (yellow card) 87'	Stadium: Alashkert Stadium; Attendance: 500; Referee: Gevorg Eghoyan

7 October 2018 10	Pyunik	0 – 1	Alashkert	Yerevan
18:00 (UTC+4)	Zhestokov (yellow card) 1'; Grigoryan (yellow card) 67'	Report	Dashyan 62'; Sekulić (yellow card) 88'	Stadium: Vazgen Sargsyan Republican Stadium; Attendance: 500; Referee: Zaven Hovhannisyan

21 October 2018 11	Alashkert	1 – 0	Gandzasar Kapan	Yerevan
15:00 (UTC+4)	Zeljković (yellow card) 9'; Daghbashyan (yellow card) 23'; Nenadović 38' (yellow card) 90+1'	Report	D.Terteryan (yellow card) 25' (yellow-red card) 87'	Stadium: Alashkert Stadium; Attendance: 1,000; Referee: Gevorg Eghoyan

31 October 2018 12	Ararat-Armenia	0 – 1	Alashkert	Yerevan
19:00 (UTC+4)	Khozin (yellow card) 90+4'	Report	T.Voskanyan (yellow card) 31'; Pashov 54' (o.g.); Jefferson (yellow card) 87' (red card) 87'	Stadium: Vazgen Sargsyan Republican Stadium; Attendance: 400; Referee: Suren Baliyan

3 November 2018 13	Alashkert	1 – 0	Shirak	Yerevan
15:00 (UTC+4)	Arta.Yedigaryan 90+2'	Report	Bougouhi (yellow card) 33'; M.Bakayoko (yellow card) 71'	Stadium: Alashkert Stadium; Attendance: 200; Referee: Artur Simonyan

11 November 2018 14	Artsakh	0 – 0	Alashkert	Yerevan
14:00 (UTC+4)	E.Yeghiazaryan (yellow card) 75'; G.Poghosyan (yellow card) 90'	Summary	T.Voskanyan (yellow card) 9' (yellow-red card) 88'	Stadium: Mika Stadium; Attendance: 200; Referee: Zaven Hovhannisyan

24 November 2018 15	Alashkert	1 – 0	Banants	Yerevan
14:30 (UTC+4)	Nenadović 2' (yellow card) 70'; Grigoryan (yellow card) 37'; Mkoyan (yellow card) 69'; S.Shahinyan (yellow card) 84'; Čančarević (yellow card) 90+2'	Report	A.Avagyan (yellow card) 27'; Wal (yellow card) 87'; Asamoah (yellow card) 90+2'	Stadium: Alashkert Stadium; Attendance: 150; Referee: Artur Simonyan

28 November 2018 16	Lori	1 – 1	Alashkert	Vanadzor
14:00 (UTC+4)	U.Iwu 32' (pen.)	Report	Sekulić (yellow card) 12'; Zeljković (yellow card) 31' (goal) 52'; Romero (yellow card) 88'; Stojković (yellow card) 90+2'	Stadium: Vanadzor Football Academy; Attendance: 500; Referee: Suren Baliyan

2 December 2018 17	Ararat Yerevan	1 – 0	Alashkert	Yerevan
14:00 (UTC+4)	G.Poghosyan 8'; V.Arzoyan (yellow card) 20' (yellow-red card) 45'; R.Avagyan (yellow card) 83'; Petrushchenkov (yellow card) 90+8'; A.Trajkoski (yellow card) 90+8'	Report	Nenadović (yellow card) 27'; Grigoryan (yellow card) 30'	Stadium: Alashkert Stadium; Attendance: 300; Referee: Gevorg Eghoyan

2 March 2019 18	Alashkert	1 – 2	Pyunik	Yerevan
14:00 (UTC+4)	Stojković (yellow card) 31'; Stezhko 65' (o.g.); Arta.Yedigaryan (yellow card) 76'; Prudnikov (yellow card) 77'	Report	Miranyan 3'; Usman (yellow card) 33'; Trusevych (yellow card) 41'; Talalay 51'; Vardanyan (yellow card) 90+1'	Stadium: Alashkert Stadium; Attendance: 500; Referee: Suren Baliyan

6 March 2019 19	Gandzasar Kapan	2 – 4	Alashkert	Yerevan
14:00 (UTC+4)	Chula 12'; D.Terteryan (yellow card) 50'; G.Harutyunyan 73'; H.Asoyan (yellow card) 75'	Report	Prudnikov 1' (pen.), 90+2'; Sekulić (yellow card) 5' (goal) 54'; Zeljković 45+2'; Čančarević (red card) 65'	Stadium: Yerevan Football Academy Stadium; Attendance: 150

17 March 2019 20	Alashkert	0 – 1	Ararat-Armenia	Yerevan
14:00 (UTC+4)	Prudnikov (yellow card) 64'; T.Voskanyan (yellow card) 90+3'	Report	Kódjo (yellow card) 34'; Mailson (yellow card) 68'; Bougouhi (yellow card) 72'; Kobyalko 73'	Stadium: Alashkert Stadium; Attendance: 800; Referee: Artur Simonyan

30 March 2019 21	Shirak	1 – 1	Alashkert	Gyumri
14:45 (UTC+4)	A.Aslanyan (yellow card) 30'; A.Muradyan 68' (yellow card) 75'	Report	Artu.Yedigaryan 10'; Prudnikov (yellow card) 45+1'; Tankov (yellow card) 89'	Stadium: Gyumri Football Academy; Attendance: 100; Referee: Suren Baliyan

7 April 2019 22	Alashkert	1 – 0	Artsakh	Yerevan
15:00 (UTC+4)	Zeljković (yellow card) 13'; Grigoryan (yellow card) 38'; Nenadović (yellow card) 53'; Marmentini 66'	Report	Gareginyan (yellow card) 21'; E.Yeghiazaryan (yellow card) 54'; Hovhannisyan (yellow card) 61'	Stadium: Alashkert Stadium; Attendance: 300; Referee: Artur Simonyan

10 April 2019 23	Banants	2 – 0	Alashkert	Yerevan
15:00 (UTC+4)	A.Bareghamyan 61' (pen.); K.Melkonyan 69' (yellow card) 74'; V.Ayvazyan (yellow card) 82'; Udo (yellow card) 89'	Report	Artu.Yedigaryan (yellow card) 45+3' (yellow-red card) 65'; T.Voskanyan (yellow card) 59'; Stojković (yellow card) 59'; Manucharyan (yellow card) 89'	Stadium: Banants Stadium; Attendance: 200; Referee: Suren Baliyan

14 April 2019 24	Alashkert	0 – 1	Lori	Yerevan
15:00 (UTC+4)		Report	Ingbede 45+1'; I.Aliyu (yellow card) 53'; D.Enock (yellow card) 90+2'	Stadium: Alashkert Stadium; Attendance: 700; Referee: Zaven Hovhannisyan

19 April 2019 25	Alashkert	2 – 0	Ararat Yerevan	Yerevan
15:00 (UTC+4)	Poghosyan 6'; Damahou 23'; T.Voskanyan (yellow card) 27'	Report	Simonyan (yellow card) 81'	Stadium: Alashkert Stadium; Attendance: 300; Referee: Gevorg Eghoyan

27 April 2019 26	Pyunik	1 – 0	Alashkert	Vagharshapat
14:00 (UTC+4)	Marku (yellow card) 64'; Grigoryan 78' (o.g.)	Report	Stojković (yellow card) 74'	Stadium: Fut Akademia; Attendance: 300; Referee: Zaven Hovhannisyan

1 May 2019 27	Alashkert	2 – 0	Gandzasar Kapan	Yerevan
15:00 (UTC+4)	Tankov 63'; Nenadović 85'	Report	Ar.Hovhannisyan (yellow card) 48'; Baldé (yellow card) 90+2'	Stadium: Alashkert Stadium; Attendance: 300; Referee: Gevorg Eghoyan

12 May 2019 28	Ararat-Armenia	2 – 1	Alashkert	Yerevan
17:00 (UTC+4)	Danielyan (yellow card) 32'; Guz (yellow card) 75'; Louis 78'; Kobyalko 88' (pen.); Sergi (yellow card) 90+3'	Report	Manucharyan (yellow card) 44'; Prudnikov 45+2'; Stojković (red card) 88'	Stadium: Yerevan Football Academy Stadium; Attendance: 500; Referee: Gevorg Eghoyan

15 May 2019 29	Alashkert	1 – 0	Shirak	Yerevan
17:00 (UTC+4)	Antonić (yellow card) 9'; Daghbashyan (yellow card) 50'; Arta.Yedigaryan (yellow card) 65'; Marmentini 73' (yellow card) 73'; Avagyan (yellow card) 90'	Report	Shabani (yellow card) 65'; A.Aslanyan (yellow card) 90'	Stadium: Alashkert Stadium; Attendance: 500; Referee: Ashot Ghaltakchyan

19 May 2019 30	Artsakh	1 – 1	Alashkert	Yerevan
16:00 (UTC+4)	K.Harutyunyan (yellow card) 33'; E.Avagyan 49'; A.Petrosyan (yellow card) 82'	Report	Antonić (yellow card) 80'; Tumasyan 90'	Stadium: Mika Stadium; Attendance: 200

24 May 2019 31	Alashkert	1 – 1	Banants	Yerevan
17:00 (UTC+4)	Manucharyan 39'; Grigoryan (yellow card) 53'; T.Voskanyan (yellow card) 69'; Daghbashyan (yellow card) 87'	Report	N.Petrosyan (yellow card) 15'; Kobzar (yellow card) 48'; Pogosyan 90+2'	Stadium: Alashkert Stadium; Attendance: 400; Referee: Zaven Hovhannisyan

30 May 2019 32	Lori	3 – 2	Alashkert	Vanadzor
17:00 (UTC+4)	I.Aliyu 21'; Ingbede 36'; W.Nwani 52'	Report	Hayrapetyan 42'; Stojković (yellow card) 72'; Manucharyan 90+2'	Stadium: Vanadzor Football Academy; Attendance: 130; Referee: Suren Baliyan

==== Table ====
Pos	Team	Pld	W	D	L	GF	GA	GD	Pts	Qualification or relegation
1	Ararat-Armenia (C)	32	18	7	7	53	28	+25	61	Qualification for the Champions League first qualifying round
2	Pyunik	32	18	6	8	46	32	+14	60	Qualification for the Europa League first qualifying round (Note: Alashkert qualified for the Europa League first qualifying round by winning the 2018–19 Armenian Cup.)
3	Banants	32	14	10	8	43	35	+8	52	Qualification for the Europa League first qualifying round
4	Alashkert	32	15	6	11	37	27	+10	51	Qualification for the Europa League first qualifying round
5	Lori	32	11	11	10	42	40	+2	44	
6	Gandzasar	32	10	8	14	38	33	+5	38	
7	Shirak	32	7	15	10	26	30	−4	36	
8	Artsakh	32	6	10	16	25	49	−24	28	
9	Ararat Yerevan	32	5	7	20	24	60	−36	22	

Source: Soccerway
Rules for classification: 1) Points; 2) Play-off (only if deciding champion); 3) Matches won; 4) Head-to-head points; 5) Head-to-head matches won; 6) Head-to-head goal difference; 7) Head-to-head goals scored; 8) Head-to-head away goals scored; 9) Goal difference; 10) Goals scored.
(C) Champions

=== Armenian Cup ===
24 October 2018 Quarterfinal 1st leg	Artsakh	1 – 2	Alashkert	Yerevan
15:00 (UTC+4)	A.Bakhtiyarov 36' (pen.); G.Aghekyan (yellow card) 79'; Minasyan (yellow card) 80'; O.Tupchiyenko (yellow card) 87'	Report	Jefferson 27' (yellow card) 47'; Voskanyan (yellow card) 35'; Arta.Yedigaryan 81' (pen.)	Stadium: Mika Stadium; Attendance: 100; Referee: Ashot Ghaltakchyan

7 November 2018 Quarterfinal 2nd leg	Alashkert	1 – 0 (3 – 1 agg.)	Artsakh	Yerevan
14:00 (UTC+4)	Marmentini (yellow card) 25'; Romero (yellow card) 31'; Poghosyan (yellow card) 33'; S.Shahinyan 90+3'	Report	A.Petrosyan (yellow card) 31'; H.Poghosyan (yellow card) 35'; A.Meliksetyan (yellow card) 90+3'	Stadium: Alashkert Stadium; Attendance: 200; Referee: Henrik Nalbandyan

3 April 2019 Semifinal 1st leg	Ararat-Armenia	2 – 2	Alashkert	Yerevan
14:00 (UTC+4)	Mkoyan 63'; Kódjo 76' (o.g.)	Report	Kobyalko 14'; Ambartsumyan (yellow card) 72'; Christian (yellow card) 73'; Khozin 79'	Stadium: Yerevan Football Academy Stadium; Attendance: 400; Referee: Zaven Hovhannisyan

22 April 2019 Semifinal 2nd leg	Alashkert	0 – 0 (a 2 – 2 agg.)	Ararat-Armenia	Yerevan
16:00 (UTC+4)	Antonić (yellow card) 41'; Čančarević (yellow card) 85'	Report	Avetisyan (yellow card) 8'; Sergi (yellow card) 90+2'	Stadium: Vazgen Sargsyan Republican Stadium; Attendance: 300; Referee: Artur Simonyan

==== Final ====
8 May 2019	Alashkert	1 – 0	Lori	Yerevan
19:30 (UTC+4)	Grigoryan (yellow card) 61'; Friday 65' (o.g.)	Report		Stadium: Banants Stadium; Attendance: 4,000; Referee: Alberto Undiano Mallenco

=== UEFA Champions League ===
==== Qualifying rounds ====
10 July 2018 First qualifying round 1st leg	Alashkert (Armenia)	0 – 3	(Scotland) Celtic	Yerevan, Armenia
20:00 (UTC+4)	Jefferson (yellow card) 15'; Artu.Yedigaryan (yellow card) 45+2'; Daghbashyan (yellow card) 67'	Report	Edouard 45+2'; Forrest 81'; McGregor 90'	Stadium: Vazgen Sargsyan Republican Stadium; Attendance: 4,948; Referee: Danilo Grujić (Serbia)
Note: FC Alashkert played their home matches at Vazgen Sargsyan Republican Stadium, Yerevan, instead of their regular stadium Alashkert Stadium, Yerevan.

17 July 2018 First qualifying round 2nd leg	Celtic (Scotland)	3 – 0 (6 – 0 agg.)	(Armenia) Alashkert	Glasgow, Scotland
22:45 (UTC+4)	Dembélé 8', 19' (pen.); Šimunović (red card) 11'; Forrest 35'; Ajer (yellow card) 75'	Report	Daghbashyan (yellow card) 16'; Jefferson (yellow card) 22'; M.Manasyan (yellow card) 57'	Stadium: Celtic Park; Attendance: 59,047; Referee: Horațiu Feșnic (Romania)

=== UEFA Europa League ===
==== Qualifying rounds ====
26 July 2018 Second qualifying round 1st leg	Sutjeska Nikšić (Montenegro)	0 – 1	(Armenia) Alashkert	Nikšić, Montenegro
22:00 (UTC+4)	Cicmil (yellow card) 8'; S.Stefanović (yellow card) 35'	Report	Zeljković 11'; Arta.Yedigaryan (yellow card) 63'; Daghbashyan (yellow card) 89'	Stadium: Gradski stadion Attendance: 2,000; Referee: Alain Bieri (Switzerland)

2 August 2018 Second qualifying round 2nd leg	Alashkert (Armenia)	0 – 0 (1 – 0 agg.)	(Montenegro) Sutjeska Nikšić	Yerevan, Armenia
19:00 (UTC+4)	Stojković (yellow card) 84'; Arta.Yedigaryan (yellow card) 89'; Čančarević (yellow card) 90+5'	Report	N.Nedić (yellow card) 70'; Denković (yellow card) 77'; S.Kordić (yellow card) 89'; Cicmil (yellow card) 90+6'	Stadium: Vazgen Sargsyan Republican Stadium; Attendance: 6,735; Referee: Ivaylo Stoyanov (Bulgaria)
Note: FC Alashkert played their home matches at Vazgen Sargsyan Republican Stadium, Yerevan, instead of their regular stadium Alashkert Stadium, Yerevan.

9 August 2018 Third qualifying round 1st leg	Alashkert (Armenia)	0 – 2	(Romania) CFR Cluj	Yerevan, Armenia
20:00 (UTC+4)	Artu.Yedigaryan (yellow card) 27'; Stojković (yellow card) 28'; Práznovský (yellow card) 48'; Romero (yellow card) 65'; Grigoryan (yellow card) 85'	Report	Țucudean 5', 49' (pen.)	Stadium: Vazgen Sargsyan Republican Stadium; Attendance: 9,000; Referee: Serhiy Boyko (Ukraine)
Note: FC Alashkert played their home matches at Vazgen Sargsyan Republican Stadium, Yerevan, instead of their regular stadium Alashkert Stadium, Yerevan.

16 August 2018 Third qualifying round 2nd leg	CFR Cluj (Romania)	5 – 0 (7 – 0 agg.)	(Armenia) Alashkert	Cluj-Napoca, Romania
21:30 (UTC+4)	Culio 19' (pen.); Omrani 45+1', 62'; Hoban 58'; Mailat 90+2'	Report	Stojković (yellow card) 45+1'	Stadium: Stadionul Dr. Constantin Rădulescu; Referee: Vilhjálmur Thórarinsson (Iceland)

== Statistics ==
As of match played 30 May 2019

=== Appearances and goals ===
No.	Pos	Nat	Player	Total		Premier League		Armenian Cup		Supercup		Champions League		Europa League	
No.	Pos	Nat	Player	Apps	Goals	Apps	Goals	Apps	Goals	Apps	Goals	Apps	Goals	Apps	Goals
1	GK	(Armenia) ARM	Henri Avagyan	9	0	5+1	0	2	0	1	0	0	0	0	0
2	MF	(Brazil) BRA	Gustavo Marmentini	27	3	17+5	2	2	0	1	1	0	0	2	0
3	DF	(Armenia) ARM	Taron Voskanyan	34	0	24+1	0	4	0	0	0	2	0	3	0
4	DF	(Serbia) SRB	Mladen Zeljković	28	3	19+3	2	2+1	0	0	0	0	0	3	1
5	DF	(Serbia) SRB	Danijel Stojković	32	1	24+2	1	3	0	0	0	0	0	2+1	0
6	DF	(Serbia) SRB	Goran Antonić	19	0	11+2	0	4	0	0	0	0	0	2	0
7	DF	(Armenia) ARM	Levon Hayrapetyan	13	1	5+5	1	3	0	0	0	0	0	0	0
8	DF	(Armenia) ARM	Gagik Daghbashyan	37	0	28+1	0	2	0	1	0	2	0	3	0
9	MF	(Chile) CHI	Gerson Acevedo	3	0	1+1	0	0+1	0	0	0	0	0	0	0
10	FW	(Armenia) ARM	Edgar Manucharyan	26	3	15+6	3	1+1	0	0	0	0	0	1+2	0
11	MF	(Armenia) ARM	Ghukas Poghosyan	18	4	9+6	3	2	0	1	1	0	0	0	0
12	MF	(Serbia) SRB	Danilo Sekulić	26	1	10+7	1	2+1	0	0	0	2	0	2+2	0
13	DF	(Russia) RUS	Denis Tumasyan	12	1	9+2	1	1	0	0	0	0	0	0	0
14	FW	(Brazil) BRA	Gláucio	3	0	1+2	0	0	0	0	0	0	0	0	0
15	FW	(Serbia) SRB	Uroš Nenadović	39	6	20+8	6	2+3	0	0	0	2	0	4	0
17	DF	(Armenia) ARM	Artak Yedigaryan	43	5	25+7	4	3+2	1	0	0	2	0	3+1	0
18	MF	(Brazil) BRA	Jefferson	15	3	3+6	2	1	1	0	0	2	0	3	0
19	FW	(Russia) RUS	Aleksandr Prudnikov	15	3	10+2	3	2+1	0	0	0	0	0	0	0
20	MF	(Armenia) ARM	Artur Yedigaryan	33	1	14+8	1	4+1	0	0	0	2	0	4	0
21	MF	(Armenia) ARM	Artak Grigoryan	36	0	27	0	3	0	0	0	2	0	4	0
22	DF	(Armenia) ARM	Hrayr Mkoyan	16	1	13	0	2+1	1	0	0	0	0	0	0
55	GK	(Serbia) SRB	Ognjen Čančarević	36	0	27	0	3	0	0	0	2	0	4	0
	DF	(Armenia) ARM	Artashes Arakelyan	1	0	0	0	0	0	1	0	0	0	0	0
	DF	(Armenia) ARM	Alen Hambartsumyan	1	0	0	0	0	0	1	0	0	0	0	0
	DF	(Armenia) ARM	Arman Manukyan	1	0	0	0	0	0	0+1	0	0	0	0	0
	MF	(Armenia) ARM	Rafayel Ghazaryan	1	0	0	0	0	0	0+1	0	0	0	0	0
	MF	(Armenia) ARM	Haykaram Muradyan	1	0	0+1	0	0	0	0	0	0	0	0	0
	MF	(Ivory Coast) CIV	Joël Damahou	15	1	7+5	1	2+1	0	0	0	0	0	0	0
	FW	(Russia) RUS	Nikita Tankov	7	1	4+3	1	0	0	0	0	0	0	0	0
Players who left Alashkert during the season:
7	FW	(Armenia) ARM	Mihran Manasyan	3	0	0	0	0	0	0	0	0+2	0	1	0
9	MF	(Armenia) ARM	Artak Dashyan	19	2	14	2	1+1	0	0	0	2	0	0+1	0
10	MF	(Armenia) ARM	Sargis Shahinyan	7	1	1+3	0	1+1	1	1	0	0	0	0	0
14	MF	(Armenia) ARM	Artem Simonyan	13	0	5+2	0	1	0	1	0	0+2	0	0+2	0
19	FW	(United States) USA	César Romero	13	0	1+5	0	2	0	1	0	0+2	0	0+2	0
22	DF	(Slovakia) SVK	Oliver Práznovský	9	0	2+1	0	0	0	0	0	2	0	4	0
	DF	(Armenia) ARM	Andranik Voskanyan	1	0	0	0	0	0	1	0	0	0	0	0
	MF	(Armenia) ARM	Benik Hovhannisyan	1	0	0	0	0	0	1	0	0	0	0	0
	FW	(Armenia) ARM	Razmik Hakobyan	2	0	0+1	0	0	0	0+1	0	0	0	0	0
	FW	(Trinidad and Tobago) TTO	Lester Peltier	1	0	1	0	0	0	0	0	0	0	0	0

=== Goal scorers ===
Place	Position	Nation	Number	Name	Premier League	Armenian Cup	Supercup	Champions League	Europa League	Total
1	FW	(Serbia)	15	Uroš Nenadović	6	0	0	0	0	6
2	MF	(Armenia)	17	Artak Yedigaryan	4	1	0	0	0	5
2				Own goal	3	2	0	0	0	5
4	MF	(Armenia)	11	Ghukas Poghosyan	3	0	1	0	0	4
5	FW	(Russia)	19	Aleksandr Prudnikov	3	0	0	0	0	3
5	FW	(Armenia)	10	Edgar Manucharyan	3	0	0	0	0	3
5	MF	(Brazil)	18	Jefferson	2	1	0	0	0	3
5	MF	(Brazil)	2	Gustavo Marmentini	2	0	1	0	0	3
5	DF	(Serbia)	4	Mladen Zeljković	2	0	0	0	1	3
10	MF	(Armenia)	9	Artak Dashyan	2	0	0	0	0	2
11	DF	(Serbia)	5	Danijel Stojković	1	0	0	0	0	1
11	MF	(Serbia)	12	Danilo Sekulić	1	0	0	0	0	1
11	MF	(Armenia)	20	Artur Yedigaryan	1	0	0	0	0	1
11	MF	(Ivory Coast)		Joël Damahou	1	0	0	0	0	1
11	FW	(Russia)		Nikita Tankov	1	0	0	0	0	1
11	DF	(Russia)	13	Denis Tumasyan	1	0	0	0	0	1
11	DF	(Armenia)	7	Levon Hayrapetyan	1	0	0	0	0	1
11	MF	(Armenia)	10	Sargis Shahinyan	0	1	0	0	0	1
11	DF	(Armenia)	22	Hrayr Mkoyan	0	1	0	0	0	1
				TOTALS	37	6	2	0	1	46

=== Clean sheets ===
Place	Position	Nation	Number	Name	Premier League	Armenian Cup	Supercup	Champions League	Europa League	Total
1	GK	(Serbia)	55	Ognjen Čančarević	12	2	0	0	2	16
2	GK	(Armenia)	1	Henri Avagyan	2	1	1	0	0	4
				TOTALS	14	3	1	0	2	20

=== Disciplinary record ===
Number	Nation	Position	Name	Premier League		Armenian Cup		Supercup		Champions League		Europa League		Total	
Number	Nation	Position	Name	Yellow card	Red card	Yellow card	Red card	Yellow card	Red card	Yellow card	Red card	Yellow card	Red card	Yellow card	Red card
1	(Armenia)	GK	Henri Avagyan	1	0	0	0	1	0	0	0	0	0	2	0
2	(Brazil)	MF	Gustavo Marmentini	2	0	1	0	0	0	0	0	0	0	3	0
3	(Armenia)	DF	Taron Voskanyan	9	1	1	0	0	0	0	0	0	0	10	1
4	(Serbia)	DF	Mladen Zeljković	5	0	0	0	0	0	0	0	0	0	5	0
5	(Serbia)	DF	Danijel Stojković	7	1	0	0	0	0	0	0	3	0	10	1
6	(Serbia)	DF	Goran Antonić	2	0	1	0	0	0	0	0	0	0	3	0
8	(Armenia)	DF	Gagik Daghbashyan	3	0	0	0	0	0	2	0	1	0	6	0
10	(Armenia)	FW	Edgar Manucharyan	2	0	0	0	0	0	0	0	0	0	2	0
11	(Armenia)	MF	Ghukas Poghosyan	2	0	1	0	0	0	0	0	0	0	3	0
12	(Serbia)	MF	Danilo Sekulić	3	0	0	0	0	0	0	0	0	0	3	0
15	(Serbia)	FW	Uroš Nenadović	4	0	0	0	0	0	0	0	0	0	4	0
17	(Armenia)	DF	Artak Yedigaryan	5	1	0	0	0	0	0	0	2	0	7	1
18	(Brazil)	MF	Jefferson	3	1	1	0	0	0	2	0	0	0	6	1
19	(Russia)	FW	Aleksandr Prudnikov	3	0	0	0	0	0	0	0	0	0	3	0
20	(Armenia)	MF	Artur Yedigaryan	1	0	0	0	0	0	1	0	1	0	3	0
21	(Armenia)	MF	Artak Grigoryan	8	1	1	0	0	0	0	0	1	0	10	1
22	(Armenia)	DF	Hrayr Mkoyan	1	0	0	0	0	0	0	0	0	0	1	0
55	(Serbia)	GK	Ognjen Čančarević	1	1	1	0	0	0	0	0	1	0	3	1
	(Armenia)	DF	Alen Hambartsumyan	0	0	0	0	2	1	0	0	0	0	2	1
	(Russia)	FW	Nikita Tankov	1	0	0	0	0	0	0	0	0	0	1	0
Players who left Alashkert during the season:
7	(Armenia)	FW	Mihran Manasyan	0	0	0	0	0	0	1	0	0	0	1	0
10	(Armenia)	MF	Sargis Shahinyan	1	0	0	0	0	0	0	0	0	0	1	0
14	(Armenia)	MF	Artem Simonyan	1	0	0	0	0	0	0	0	0	0	1	0
19	(United States)	FW	César Romero	1	0	1	0	1	0	0	0	1	0	4	0
22	(Slovakia)	DF	Oliver Práznovský	1	0	0	0	0	0	0	0	1	0	2	0
	(Armenia)	FW	Razmik Hakobyan	0	0	0	0	1	0	0	0	0	0	1	0
			TOTALS	67	6	8	0	5	1	6	0	11	0	97	7
