= 2020–21 FC Alashkert season =

Alashkert
2020-21 season
- Chairman: Bagrat Navoyan
- Manager: Yegishe Melikyan (until 5 January); Abraham Khashmanyan (7 January - 20 May); Aleksandr Grigoryan (from 20 May)
- Stadium: Alashkert Stadium
- Premier League: Champions
- Armenian Cup: Runners Up
- Europa League: First qualifying round vs Renova
- Top goalscorer: League: David Davidyan (5); All: Two Players (7)
Home colours	Away colours

The 2020–21 season was Alashkert's ninth season in the Armenian Premier League and fourteenth overall. Alashkert finished the season as Champions for the first time since 2017–18. Alashkert where also Runners Up in the Armenian Cup and where knocked out of the UEFA Europa League by Renova at the first qualifying round.

== Season events ==
On 27 July, Alashkert announced that Henri Avagyan, Aleksandar Miljković, Nikita Baranov and Hayk Ishkhanyan had left the club after their contracts had been terminated by mutual consent, whilst Ognjen Čančarević, Tiago Cametá and Thiago Galvão had all extended their contract with the club. On the same day, Alashkert announced the signing of Grigor Aghekyan to a two-year contract from Gandzasar Kapan.

On 29 July, Alashkert announced the signing of Perdigão.

On 2 August, Edgar Manucharyan announced his retirement from football, and Alashkert announced the signing of Ihor Honchar.

On 7 August, Alashkert announced the signing of Aghvan Papikyan from Chojniczanka Chojnice.

On 12 August, Alashkert announced the signing of Rumyan Hovsepyan after his contract with Arda Kardzhali had expired.

On 4 September, after less than a month with the club, Aghvan Papikyan left the club to join Ararat Yerevan.

On 23 September, goalkeeper Andrija Dragojević Alashkert, having previously signed for the club in 2018, from Pyunik where his contract had expired.

On 29 September, the season was suspended indefinitely due to the escalating 2020 Nagorno-Karabakh conflict. On 13 October, the FFA announced that the season would resume on 17 October.

On 17 October, Alashkert announced the signing of Marko Tomić.

On 22 October, Alashkert's match against Ararat Yerevan was postponed due to 4 positive COVID-19 cases within the Alashkert team. A week later, their game against Ararat-Armenia was also postponed due to the positive COVID-19 cases.

On 5 January, Alashkert terminated their contract with head coach Yegishe Melikyan by mutual consent, with Abraham Khashmanyan being appointed as his replacement on 7 January.

On 14 January, Alashkert announced the signing of David Yurchenko.

On 2 February, Alashkert announced that Risto Mitrevski had returned to the club having previously left the club in October.

On 9 February, Alashkert announced the signing of Didier Kadio, with Mihailo Jovanović signing from Valletta the following day. On 11 February, Alashkert announced the signing of Dejan Boljević from Taraz.

On 12 February, Branko Mihajlović signed for Alashkert from Mačva Šabac.

On 21 February, Alashkert announced the signings of Gevorg Kasparov, Ashot Kocharyan, Vaspurak Minasyan, Davit Minasyan and Mihran Manasyan.

On 9 March, Alashkert announced the signing of Vincent Bezecourt who'd last played for Miami.

On 9 April, Alashkert's match against Shirak was postponed as Alashkert were unable to travel to Gyumri due to protests. The following day, the match was rearranged for 11 April.

On 20 May, Abraham Khashmanyan left his role as Head Coach by mutual consent, with Aleksandr Grigoryan being announced as his replacement the same day.

== Squad ==
As of match played 28 May 2021

Number	Name	Nationality	Position	Date of birth (age)	Signed from	Signed in	Contract ends	Apps.	Goals
Goalkeepers
1	David Yurchenko	(Armenia)	GK	27 March 1986 (age 40)	Shakhter Karagandy	2021		8	0
22	Ognjen Čančarević	(Serbia)	GK	25 September 1989 (age 36)	Radnik Surdulica	2018		103	0
25	Gevorg Kasparov	(Armenia)	GK	25 July 1980 (age 46)	Shirak	2021		47	0
Defenders
2	Tiago Cametá	(Brazil)	DF	5 May 1992 (age 34)	Vila Nova	2019		59	0
3	Taron Voskanyan	(Armenia)	DF	22 February 1993 (age 33)	Nea Salamis Famagusta	2018		105	3
4	Mihailo Jovanović	(Serbia)	DF	15 February 1989 (age 37)	Valletta	2021		11	0
5	Didier Kadio	(Ivory Coast)	DF	5 April 1990 (age 36)	Al-Hilal	2021		18	0
8	Gagik Daghbashyan	(Armenia)	DF	19 October 1990 (age 35)	MFK Ružomberok	2016		142	1
15	Vaspurak Minasyan	(Armenia)	DF	29 June 1994 (age 32)	Gandzasar Kapan	2021		10	0
33	Dejan Boljević	(Montenegro)	DF	30 May 1990 (age 36)	Taraz	2021		17	1
94	Ashot Kocharyan	(Armenia)	DF	13 July 1999 (age 27)	Gandzasar Kapan	2021		1	0
Midfielders
7	Wangu Gome	(Namibia)	MF	13 February 1993 (age 33)	Cape Umoya United	2020		38	4
9	Rumyan Hovsepyan	(Armenia)	MF	13 November 1991 (age 34)	Arda Kardzhali	2020		25	2
11	Davit Minasyan	(Armenia)	MF	3 March 1993 (age 33)	Gandzasar Kapan	2021			
16	Vincent Bezecourt	(France)	MF	10 June 1993 (age 33)	Miami	2021		11	1
19	Pape Camara	(Senegal)	MF	24 September 1991 (age 34)	Urartu	2019		30	2
21	Artak Grigoryan	(Armenia)	MF	19 October 1987 (age 38)	Mika	2015		183	5
96	Erik Soghomonyan	(Armenia)	MF	2 April 1999 (age 27)	Youth team	2020		7	0
97	David Davidyan	(Russia)	MF	14 December 1997 (age 28)	Ararat Yerevan	2020		26	7
Forwards
10	Aleksandar Glišić	(Bosnia and Herzegovina)	FW	3 September 1992 (age 34)	Urartu	2020		49	18
20	Thiago Galvão	(Brazil)	FW	24 August 1989 (age 37)	Floriana	2019		54	14
27	Mihran Manasyan	(Armenia)	FW	13 January 1989 (age 37)	Van	2021			
77	Grigor Aghekyan	(Armenia)	FW	6 April 1996 (age 30)	Gandzasar Kapan	2020	2022	15	0
88	Sunday Ingbede	(Nigeria)	FW	23 April 1998 (age 28)	Lori	2020		14	1
98	Branko Mihajlović	(Serbia)	FW	20 February 1991 (age 35)	Mačva Šabac	2021		14	1
99	Nikita Tankov	(Russia)	FW	20 September 1996 (age 29)	Dnepr Smolensk	2019		57	9
Away on loan
Left during the season
1	Gor Manukyan	(Armenia)	GK	27 September 1993 (age 32)	Pyunik	2019		0	0
4	Risto Mitrevski	(North Macedonia)	DF	5 October 1991 (age 34)	Alashkert	2021		18	2
5	Arman Sargsyan	(Armenia)	MF	23 July 1997 (age 29)	Youth team	2019		1	0
11	Vahagn Hayrapetyan	(Armenia)	MF	14 June 1997 (age 29)	Pyunik	2019		29	1
15	Bryan	(Brazil)	DF	28 March 1992 (age 34)	CRB	2020		22	2
16	Marko Tomić	(Serbia)	DF	28 October 1991 (age 34)	Irtysh Pavlodar	2020		7	0
23	David Gatikoyev	(Russia)	FW	14 September 1993 (age 33)	Spartak Vladikavkaz	2020		7	1
25	Andrija Dragojević	(Montenegro)	GK	25 December 1991 (age 34)	Pyunik	2020		1	0
25	Gor Poghosyan	(Armenia)	DF	11 June 1988 (age 38)	Ararat Yerevan	2019		2	0
27	Ghukas Poghosyan	(Armenia)	FW	6 February 1994 (age 32)	Van	2020		27	4
33	Ihor Honchar	(Ukraine)	DF	10 January 1993 (age 33)	Lviv	2020		12	0
88	Perdigão	(Brazil)	FW	17 July 1991 (age 35)	Boavista	2020		7	0
94	Aghvan Papikyan	(Armenia)	MF	8 February 1994 (age 32)	Chojniczanka Chojnice	2020		2	0
96	Eduard Avagyan	(Armenia)	MF	21 March 1996 (age 30)	Pyunik	2019		5	2
98	Hayk Galstyan	(Armenia)	MF	23 March 1998 (age 28)		2020		2	0

== Transfers ==
=== In ===
Date	Position	Nationality	Name	From	Fee	Ref.
Summer 2020	MF	(Armenia)	David Davidyan	Ararat Yerevan	Free	
27 July 2020	FW	(Armenia)	Grigor Aghekyan	Gandzasar Kapan	Undisclosed	
29 July 2020	FW	(Brazil)	Perdigão	Unattached	Free	
2 August 2020	DF	(Ukraine)	Ihor Honchar	Lviv	Undisclosed	
7 August 2020	MF	(Armenia)	Aghvan Papikyan	Chojniczanka Chojnice	Undisclosed	
12 August 2020	MF	(Armenia)	Rumyan Hovsepyan	Arda Kardzhali	Free	
17 September 2020	FW	(Armenia)	Ghukas Poghosyan	Van	Free	
23 September 2020	GK	(Montenegro)	Andrija Dragojević	Pyunik	Free	
17 October 2020	DF	(Serbia)	Marko Tomić	Irtysh Pavlodar	Free	
14 January 2021	GK	(Armenia)	David Yurchenko	Shakhter Karagandy	Undisclosed	
2 February 2021	DF	(North Macedonia)	Risto Mitrevski	Alashkert	Free	
9 February 2021	DF	(Ivory Coast)	Didier Kadio	Al-Hilal	Undisclosed	
10 February 2021	DF	(Serbia)	Mihailo Jovanović	Valletta	Undisclosed	
11 February 2021	DF	(Montenegro)	Dejan Boljević	Taraz	Undisclosed	
12 February 2021	FW	(Serbia)	Branko Mihajlović	Mačva Šabac	Undisclosed	
21 February 2021	GK	(Armenia)	Gevorg Kasparov	Shirak	Free	
21 February 2021	DF	(Armenia)	Ashot Kocharyan	Gandzasar Kapan	Free	
21 February 2021	DF	(Armenia)	Vaspurak Minasyan	Gandzasar Kapan	Free	
21 February 2021	MF	(Armenia)	Davit Minasyan	Gandzasar Kapan	Free	
21 February 2021	FW	(Armenia)	Mihran Manasyan	Van	Free	
9 March 2021	MF	(France)	Vincent Bezecourt	Miami	Free	

=== Out ===
Date	Position	Nationality	Name	To	Fee	Ref.
29 August 2020	MF	(Armenia)	Eduard Avagyan	Gandzasar Kapan	Undisclosed	
4 September 2020	MF	(Armenia)	Aghvan Papikyan	Ararat Yerevan	Undisclosed	
27 October 2020	FW	(Brazil)	Perdigão	Cuiabá	Undisclosed	
26 January 2021	DF	(Ukraine)	Ihor Honchar	Pyunik	Undisclosed	
3 February 2021	DF	(Serbia)	Marko Tomić	Napredak Kruševac	Undisclosed	
5 February 2021	DF	(Brazil)	Bryan	Atyrau	Undisclosed	

=== Released ===
Date	Position	Nationality	Name	Joined	Date	Ref.
21 July 2020	DF	(Armenia)	Hayk Ishkhanyan	Gandzasar Kapan	21 July 2020	
27 July 2020	GK	(Armenia)	Henri Avagyan	Van	5 August 2020	
27 July 2020	DF	(Serbia)	Aleksandar Miljković	Partizan	3 September 2020	
27 July 2020	DF	(Estonia)	Nikita Baranov	Karmiotissa		
1 August 2020	DF	(Armenia)	Gor Poghosyan	West Armenia	1 August 2021	
2 August 2020	FW	(Armenia)	Edgar Manucharyan	Retired		
1 October 2020	MF	(Armenia)	Arman Sargsyan	West Armenia	1 October 2021	
1 October 2020	FW	(Russia)	David Gatikoyev			
5 October 2020	DF	(North Macedonia)	Risto Mitrevski	Alashkert	2 February 2021	
31 December 2020	GK	(Armenia)	Gor Manukyan	Lori	19 February 2021	
31 December 2020	GK	(Montenegro)	Andrija Dragojević	Dečić		
31 December 2020	MF	(Armenia)	Vigen Avetisyan			
31 December 2020	MF	(Armenia)	Vahagn Hayrapetyan			
31 December 2020	FW	(Armenia)	Ghukas Poghosyan	Lori	17 February 2021	
9 February 2021	DF	(North Macedonia)	Risto Mitrevski	Sabah		
31 May 2020	MF	(Armenia)	Davit Minasyan	Noravank		
31 May 2020	MF	(Senegal)	Pape Camara	Al-Qous		
31 May 2020	FW	(Armenia)	Mihran Manasyan			
31 May 2020	FW	(Brazil)	Thiago Galvão	Pyunik	17 January 2022	
31 May 2020	FW	(Nigeria)	Sunday Ingbede	Noravank	14 September 2021	

== Friendlies ==
28 July 2020	Alashkert	0 – 1	Van	Yerevan
(UTC+4)		Report	Goal	Stadium: Yerevan Football Academy Stadium

6 August 2020	Alashkert	2 – 0	BKMA Yerevan	Yerevan
(UTC+4)	Thiago Galvão	Report		Stadium: Yerevan Football Academy Stadium

8 August 2020	Alashkert	1 – 3	Urartu	Yerevan
18:00 (UTC+4)	Polyakov 50' (pen.), 52'; Désiré 75'	Report	Thiago Galvão 60'	Stadium: Alashkert Stadium

5 September 2020	Alashkert	2 – 1	Van	Yerevan
12:00 (UTC+4)	Glišić; Aghekyan	Report	Goal	Stadium: Alashkert Stadium

10 October 2020	Noah	1 – 1	Alashkert	Yerevan
(UTC+4)	Goal	Report	Glišić

16 January 2021	Alashkert	3 – 2	Pyunik-2	Yerevan
(UTC+4)	Aghekyan; Trialist	Report	Goal

2 February 2021	Van	1 – 0	Alashkert	Charentsavan
(UTC+4)	G.Kirakosyan	Report		Stadium: Charentsavan City Stadium

== Competitions ==
=== Premier League ===
==== Results summary ====
Overall								Home						Away					
Pld	W	D	L	GF	GA	GD	Pts	W	D	L	GF	GA	GD	W	D	L	GF	GA	GD
24	13	7	4	25	16	+9	46	6	3	2	10	7	+3	7	4	2	15	9	+6

Last updated: 28 May 2021.
Source: See Results

==== Results by round ====
Round	1	2	3	4	5	6	7	8	9	10	11	12	13	14	15	16	17	18	19	20	21	22	23	24
Ground	H	H	H	A	H	A	A	H	A	H	A	H	A	H	A	H	A	H	A	A	A	A	A	H
Result	D	W	L	W	D	D	W	L	W	W	W	W	D	D	D	W	L	W	D	L	W	W	W	W
Position	5	5	4	3	3	3	1	1	5	5	2	2	2	2	2	1	3	1	4	4	2	2	1	1

Updated to match(es) played on 28 May 2021. Source: See Results
A = Away; H = Home; W = Win; D = Draw; L = Loss

==== Results ====
14 August 2020 1	Alashkert	0 – 0	Ararat-Armenia	Yerevan
17:30 (UTC+4)	Glišić (yellow card) 47'; Bryan (yellow card) 90'	Report	S.Shahinyan (yellow card) 15' (yellow-red card) 61'; A.Khachumyan (yellow card) 90'	Stadium: Alashkert Stadium; Attendance: 0 Referee: Henrik Nalbandyan
Note: Match played behind closed doors due to the COVID-19 pandemic.

21 August 2020 2	Alashkert	1 – 0	Noah	Yerevan
17:30 (UTC+4)	Mitrevski (yellow card) 61'; Čančarević (yellow card) 63'; Glišić (yellow card) 72'; Grigoryan (yellow card) 79'; D.Davidyan 90+1'	Report	H.Manga (yellow card) 45'; Spătaru (yellow card) 79'; Azarov (yellow card) 83'	Stadium: Alashkert Stadium; Attendance: 0 Referee: Ashot Ghaltakchyan
Note: Match played behind closed doors due to the COVID-19 pandemic.

13 September 2020 4	Alashkert	1 – 2	Urartu	Yerevan
19:00 (UTC+4)	Glišić 57'; Mitrevski (yellow card) 87'	Report	Désiré 9' (pen.), 70'; Vitinho (yellow card) 29'	Stadium: Urartu-1; Attendance: 0 Referee: Zaven Hovhannisyan
Note: Match played behind closed doors due to the COVID-19 pandemic.

24 September 2020 5	Van	0 – 1	Alashkert	Charentsavan
16:30 (UTC+4)	J.Gaba (yellow card) 36'; M.Bammatgereev (yellow card) 56'; A.Petrosyan (yellow card) 76'	Report	Daghbashyan (red card) 44'; D.Davidyan 61'; Čančarević (yellow card) 87'; Gome (yellow card) 90+4'	Stadium: Charentsavan City Stadium; Attendance: 0 Referee: Artem Gasparyan

18 October 2020 8	Alashkert	0 – 0	Pyunik	Yerevan
16:00 (UTC+4)	Perdigão (yellow card) 61'	Report	Malakyan (yellow card) 8'; Kobyalko (yellow card) 83'	Stadium: Alashkert Stadium; Attendance: 0 Referee: Shahen Aghayan
Note: Match played behind closed doors due to the COVID-19 pandemic.

26 October 2020 9	Shirak	1 – 1	Alashkert	Gyumri
15:30 (UTC+4)	H.Nazaryan (yellow card) 21'; Tomić 50' (o.g.)	Report	Honchar (yellow card) 9'; D.Davidyan 10'; Gome (yellow card) 58'; Bryan (yellow card) 90+4'	Stadium: Gyumri City Stadium; Attendance: 0 Referee: Artem Gasparyan
Note: Match played behind closed doors due to the COVID-19 pandemic.

2 November 2020 11	Noah	1 – 2	Alashkert	Yerevan
16:00 (UTC+4)	Hovhannisyan (yellow card) 68'; A.Oliveira 86'	Report	Glišić (yellow card) 7' (goal) 25' (pen.); D.Davidyan 45'; Aghekyan (red card) 72'	Stadium: Alashkert Stadium; Attendance: 0 Referee: Ashot Ghaltakchyan
Note: Match played behind closed doors due to the COVID-19 pandemic.

21 November 2020 12	Alashkert	1 – 2	Ararat Yerevan	Yerevan
14:30 (UTC+4)	Voskanyan 55'; Gome (yellow card) 61'; Tomić (yellow card) 73'; Grigoryan (yellow card) 86'; Thiago Galvão (yellow card) 89'	Report	Nenadović 22'; Mkoyan (red card) 29'; M.Kone 50' (pen.); Udo (yellow card) 70'; V.Yermakov (yellow card) 90+4'	Stadium: Alashkert Stadium; Attendance: 0 Referee: Zaven Hovhannisyan
Note: Match played behind closed doors due to the COVID-19 pandemic.

26 November 2020 13	Urartu	1 – 2	Alashkert	Yerevan
18:00 (UTC+4)	Polyakov (yellow card) 48'; K.Ayvazyan (yellow card) 61'; Radchenko 90'	Report	Hovsepyan 19'; Thiago Galvão 20'; Honchar (yellow card) 33'; Gome (yellow card) 74'	Stadium: Urartu Stadium; Attendance: 0 Referee: Shahen Aghayan
Note: Match played behind closed doors due to the COVID-19 pandemic.

30 November 2020 14	Alashkert	2 – 1	Van	Yerevan
14:00 (UTC+4)	Glišić (yellow card) 24' (goal) 36' (pen.); D.Davidyan 69'	Report	Tenyayev (yellow card) 35'; G.Kirakosyan 75'	Stadium: Alashkert Stadium; Attendance: 0 Referee: Artem Gasparyan
Note: Match played behind closed doors due to the COVID-19 pandemic.

24 February 2021 7	Lori	0 – 1	Alashkert	Vanadzor
14:00 (UTC+4)	Stepanov (yellow card) 10'; A.Kocharyan (yellow card) 22'; N.Antwi (yellow card) 67'	Report	Grigoryan (yellow card) 21'; D.Davidyan (red card) 29'; N.Tankov 39'; Voskanyan (yellow card) 90+5'	Stadium: Vanadzor Football Academy; Attendance: 0 Referee: Artem Gasparyan
Note: Match played behind closed doors due to the COVID-19 pandemic.

28 February 2021 16	Alashkert	2 – 1	Lori	Yerevan
14:00 (UTC+4)	N.Tankov 36'; Voskanyan (yellow card) 49'; Grigoryan (yellow card) 74' (goal) 79'	Report	A.Mensalão 40'; Stepanov (yellow card) 77'; D.Paremuzyan (yellow card) 80'	Stadium: Alashkert Stadium; Attendance: 0 Referee: Henrik Nalbandyan
Note: Match played behind closed doors due to the COVID-19 pandemic.

5 March 2021 17	Pyunik	1 – 1	Alashkert	Yerevan
14:00 (UTC+4)	Caraballo 43'; Tatarkov (yellow card) 45'	Report	Grigoryan (yellow card) 33'; Gome (yellow card) 60'; Thiago Galvão 69'	Stadium: Republican Stadium; Referee: Henrik Nalbandyan

17 March 2021 18	Alashkert	0 – 0	Shirak	Yerevan
15:00 (UTC+4)	Jovanović (yellow card) 12'; Bezecourt (yellow card) 30'; Thiago Galvão (yellow card) 52'; Tiago Cametá (yellow card) 90+1'; Kadio (yellow card) 90+5'	Report	A.Sadoyan (yellow card) 25'; Ishkhanyan (yellow card) 29' (yellow-red card) 48'; Mikaelyan (yellow card) 52'; S.Urushanyan (yellow card) 68'; A.Aslanyan (yellow card) 90+1'; Stefanović (yellow card) 90+2'	Stadium: Alashkert Stadium; Attendance: 150; Referee: Vardan Manukyan

11 April 2021 19	Shirak	0 – 0	Alashkert	Gyumri
15:00 (UTC+4)	R.Mkrtchyan (yellow card) 36'; A.Aslanyan (yellow card) 69'; S.Urushanyan (yellow card) 73'	Report	Kadio (yellow card) 53'	Stadium: Gyumri City Stadium; Attendance: 70; Referee: Artem Gasparyan
Note: Match postponed on 9 April due to Alashkert being unable to travel to Gyumri due to protests, and rearranged for 11 April the following day.

14 April 2021 20	Alashkert	1 – 0	Urartu	Yerevan
16:30 (UTC+4)	Voskanyan (yellow card) 14'; Ingbede (yellow card) 32'; Gome (yellow card) 56' (goal) 90+2'; Hovsepyan (yellow card) 86'	Report	E.Grigoryan (yellow card) 62'	Stadium: Alashkert Stadium; Attendance: 120; Referee: Artem Gasparyan

26 April 2021 21	Noah	1 – 0	Alashkert	Yerevan
18:00 (UTC+4)	Kireyenko 22'; Emsis (yellow card) 37'; Kryuchkov (yellow card) 64'; Velemir (yellow card) 65'	Report	Voskanyan (yellow card) 35'; Grigoryan (yellow card) 37'; Kadio (yellow card) 40'; Hovsepyan (yellow card) 57'	Stadium: FFA Academy Stadium; Referee: Artem Gasparyan

6 May 2021 22	Alashkert	1 – 0	Pyunik	Yerevan
15:00 (UTC+4)	Glišić (yellow card) 38'; Kadio (yellow card) 58'; Jovanović (yellow card) 62'; Mihajlović 65'; V.Minasyan (yellow card) 78'	Report	Hovhannisyan (yellow card) 70'	Stadium: Alashkert Stadium; Attendance: 200; Referee: Ashot Ghaltakchyan

10 May 2021 23	Ararat Yerevan	0 – 0	Alashkert	Yerevan
19:00 (UTC+4)	Malakyan (yellow card) 51'	Report	Hovsepyan (yellow card) 61'; Bezecourt (yellow card) 71'; Tiago Cametá (yellow card) 75'; Jovanović (red card) 79'; Voskanyan (yellow card) 84'	Stadium: Republican Stadium; Attendance: 700; Referee: Henrik Nalbandyan

19 May 2021 24	Van	3 – 1	Alashkert	Charentsavan
15:30 (UTC+4)	E.Essien (yellow card) 38'; Eza 51', 63'; Va.Ayvazyan 53'	Report	Gome 71'; Grigoryan (yellow card) 78'	Stadium: Charentsavan City Stadium; Attendance: 400; Referee: Artem Gasparyan

22 May 2021 10	Ararat-Armenia	1 – 2	Alashkert	Yerevan
16:45 (UTC+4)	Bueno 46'; A.Khachumyan (yellow card) 49'; Wbeymar (yellow card) 52'; Klymenchuk (yellow card) 83'; Ambartsumyan (yellow card) 88'	Report	Gome 14' (yellow card) 90+4'; Glišić (yellow card) 31'; Voskanyan 90+2'; Grigoryan (yellow card) 90+2'	Stadium: FFA Academy Stadium; Attendance: 500; Referee: Henrik Nalbandyan
Note: Match originally scheduled for 31 October, but was postponed on 29 October due to the COVID-19 pandemic.

23 May 2021 26	Lori	0 – 3	Alashkert	Vanadzor
12:00 (UTC+4)		Report		Stadium: Vanadzor Football Academy
Note: Match awarded 3-0 to Alashkert.

25 May 2021 3	Ararat Yerevan	0 – 1	Alashkert	Yerevan
19:30 (UTC+4)	Mkoyan (yellow card) 69'	Report	Grigoryan (yellow card) 40'; Bezecourt 75'; Čančarević (yellow card) 90+1'	Stadium: Republican Stadium; Attendance: 500; Referee: Artem Gasparyan
Note: Match originally scheduled for 22 October, but postponed on the same day due to the COVID-19 pandemic.

28 May 2021 25	Alashkert	1 – 0	Ararat-Armenia	Yerevan
17:30 (UTC+4)	Hovsepyan (yellow card) 53'; Boljević 67'	Report	Wbeymar (yellow card) 50'; Bueno (red card) 87'	Stadium: Alashkert Stadium; Referee: Henrik Nalbandyan

==== Table ====
Pos	Team	Pld	W	D	L	GF	GA	GD	Pts	Qualification or relegation
1	Alashkert (C)	24	13	7	4	25	15	+10	46	Qualification for the Champions League first qualifying round
2	Noah	24	12	5	7	35	20	+15	41	Qualification for the Europa Conference League first qualifying round
3	Urartu	24	12	5	7	28	19	+9	41	Qualification for the Europa Conference League first qualifying round
4	Ararat (Note: Ararat qualified for Europa Conference League first qualifying round as winners of 2020–21 Armenian Cup.)	24	11	7	6	34	18	+16	40	Qualification for the Europa Conference League first qualifying round
5	Ararat-Armenia	24	10	8	6	32	17	+15	38	
6	Van	24	9	4	11	25	30	−5	31	
7	Pyunik	24	6	7	11	20	18	+2	25	
8	Lori (Note: Round 19–27 matches involving Lori were all declared 3–0 forfeits in favor of the remaining 8 teams.)	24	7	2	15	16	44	−28	23	
9	Shirak (R)	24	2	7	15	19	53	−34	13	Relegation to First League
10	Gandzasar (R, D)	0	0	0	0	0	0	0	0	Club disqualified (Note: Gandzasar were excluded from the league On 3 November, Gandzasar Kapan announced that they were withdrawing from the League and Armenian Cup due to the ongoing financial constraints relating to the ongoing COVID-19 pandemic in Armenia and the 2020 Nagorno-Karabakh conflict.)

Source: FFA Soccerway
Rules for classification: 1) Points; 2) Play-off (only if deciding champion); 3) Matches won; 4) Head-to-head points; 5) Head-to-head matches won; 6) Head-to-head goal difference; 7) Head-to-head goals scored; 8) Head-to-head away goals scored; 9) Goal difference; 10) Goals scored.
(C) Champions; (D) Disqualified; (R) Relegated

=== Armenian Cup ===
19 September 2020 First Round 1st leg	Shirak	1 – 2	Alashkert	Gyumri
16:30 (UTC+4)	A.Muradyan 4'; E.Vardanyan (yellow card) 72'; V.Arzoyan (yellow card) 72'; R.Mkrtchyan (yellow card) 80'	Report	Perdigão (yellow card) 39'; Bryan 41'; Camara 43'; Hovsepyan (yellow card) 59'; Grigoryan (yellow card) 74'; Čančarević (yellow card) 90+1'	Stadium: Gyumri City Stadium; Attendance: 150; Referee: Henrik Nalbandyan

7 November 2020 First Round 2nd leg	Alashkert	1 – 0 (3 – 1 agg.)	Shirak	Yerevan
12:00 (UTC+4)	Glišić 80'; Thiago Galvão (yellow card) 83'; Dragojević (yellow card) 85'	Report	E.Vardanyan (yellow card) 22'; V.Arzoyan (yellow card) 26'; P.Afajanyan (yellow card) 44'; A.Aslanyan (yellow card) 61'; P.Afajanyan (yellow card) 62'	Stadium: Alashkert Stadium; Attendance: 0 Referee: Vardan Manukyan

11 March 2021 Quarterfinal 1st leg	Alashkert	4 – 0	BKMA Yerevan	Yerevan
16:00 (UTC+4)	N.Tankov 23'; D.Davidyan 34'; Daghbashyan 65'; Gome 84'; Grigoryan (yellow card) 86'	Report	Sergey Mkrtchyan (yellow card) 9'; Stepan Sahradyan (yellow card) 32'	Stadium: Alashkert Stadium; Referee: Ashot Ghaltakchyan

5 April 2021 Quarterfinal 2nd leg	BKMA Yerevan	1 – 2 (1 – 6 agg.)	Alashkert	Yerevan
15:00 (UTC+4)	Shaghoyan 45'	Report	Glišić 24'; E.Soghomonyan (yellow card) 45'; Ingbede 63'; Voskanyan (yellow card) 90+3'	Stadium: Republican Stadium; Attendance: 80; Referee: Artur Safaryan

20 April 2021 Semifinal 1st leg	Alashkert	1 – 1	Noah	Yerevan
15:00 (UTC+4)	Kadio (yellow card) 12'; Glišić 31' (pen.); Grigoryan (yellow card) 70'; Gome (yellow card) 90+3'	Report	S.Gomes (yellow card) 22'; Kovalenko (yellow card) 22'; Paireli (yellow card) 38'; Avetisyan 66' (pen.); Hovhannisyan (yellow card) 81'; Monroy (yellow card) 83'	Stadium: Alashkert Stadium; Attendance: 100; Referee: Zaven Hovhannisyan

30 April 2021 Semifinal 2nd leg	Noah	1 – 3 (2 – 4 agg.)	Alashkert	Yerevan
15:00 (UTC+4)	Gyasi 41'; N.Dubchak (yellow card) 64'; Emsis (yellow card) 66'; V.Vimercati (yellow card) 90+2'; Monroy (yellow card) 90+2'	Report	Hovsepyan 3'; Gome (yellow card) 26'; Glišić 58' (yellow card) 70'; M.Manasyan (yellow card) 90+2'; D.Davidyan 90+5'	Stadium: FFA Academy Stadium; Attendance: 500; Referee: Henrik Nalbandyan

==== Final ====
15 May 2021	Alashkert	1 – 3	Ararat Yerevan	Yerevan
19:00 (UTC+4)	Kadio (yellow card) 47'; Aghekyan (yellow card) 65'; M.Manasyan 85' (yellow card) 90+2'; Hovsepyan (red card) 90'	Report	Papikyan 12'; M.Kone 19', 55'; Prljević (yellow card) 49'	Stadium: Republican Stadium; Attendance: 4,000

=== UEFA Europa League ===
==== Qualifying rounds ====
27 August 2020 First Qualifying Round	Alashkert (Armenia)	0 – 1	(North Macedonia) Renova	Yerevan, Armenia
20:00 (UTC+4)	Gome (yellow card) 45'; Grigoryan (yellow card) 54'; Glišić (yellow card) 78'; Thiago Galvão (yellow card) 79'	Report	Selmani (yellow card) 41'; Mishkovski 58'; Shefiti (yellow card) 61'; B.Sadiki (yellow card) 78'	Stadium: Republican Stadium; Attendance: 0 Referee: Nick Walsh (Scotland)
Note: Match to be played at the Republican Stadium, Yerevan, instead of Alashkert's regular Alashkert Stadium, Yerevan, which did not meet UEFA requirements. Match played behind closed doors.

== Statistics ==
As of match played 28 May 2021

=== Appearances and goals ===
No.	Pos	Nat	Player	Total		Premier League		Armenian Cup		UEFA Europa League	
No.	Pos	Nat	Player	Apps	Goals	Apps	Goals	Apps	Goals	Apps	Goals
1	GK	(Armenia) ARM	David Yurchenko	8	0	5	0	3	0	0	0
2	DF	(Brazil) BRA	Tiago Cametá	28	0	20+1	0	6	0	1	0
3	DF	(Armenia) ARM	Taron Voskanyan	28	2	20	2	6+1	0	1	0
4	DF	(Serbia) SRB	Mihailo Jovanović	11	0	5+2	0	3+1	0	0	0
5	DF	(Ivory Coast) CIV	Didier Kadio	18	0	13	0	5	0	0	0
7	MF	(Namibia) NAM	Wangu Gome	27	4	18+2	3	3+3	1	1	0
8	DF	(Armenia) ARM	Gagik Daghbashyan	16	1	7+4	0	3+2	1	0	0
9	MF	(Armenia) ARM	Rumyan Hovsepyan	25	2	11+8	1	5+1	1	0	0
10	FW	(Bosnia and Herzegovina) BIH	Aleksandar Glišić	24	7	15+1	3	5+2	4	1	0
11	MF	(Armenia) ARM	Davit Minasyan	3	0	0+2	0	0+1	0	0	0
15	DF	(Armenia) ARM	Vaspurak Minasyan	10	0	7+1	0	2	0	0	0
16	MF	(France) FRA	Vincent Bezecourt	11	1	3+5	1	3	0	0	0
19	MF	(Senegal) SEN	Pape Camara	20	1	5+10	0	2+2	1	0+1	0
20	FW	(Brazil) BRA	Thiago Galvão	21	2	15+1	2	4	0	1	0
21	MF	(Armenia) ARM	Artak Grigoryan	26	1	19+1	1	5	0	1	0
22	GK	(Serbia) SRB	Ognjen Čančarević	22	0	18	0	3	0	1	0
27	FW	(Armenia) ARM	Mihran Manasyan	6	1	1+2	0	0+3	1	0	0
33	DF	(Montenegro) MNE	Dejan Boljević	18	1	11+2	1	4+1	0	0	0
77	FW	(Armenia) ARM	Grigor Aghekyan	15	0	2+10	0	1+2	0	0	0
88	FW	(Nigeria) NGR	Sunday Ingbede	12	1	4+5	0	1+2	1	0	0
94	DF	(Armenia) ARM	Ashot Kocharyan	1	0	0	0	0+1	0	0	0
96	MF	(Armenia) ARM	Erik Soghomonyan	7	0	0+4	0	1+2	0	0	0
97	MF	(Russia) RUS	David Davidyan	26	7	15+4	5	2+5	2	0	0
98	FW	(Serbia) SRB	Branko Mihajlović	14	1	5+7	1	2	0	0	0
99	FW	(Russia) RUS	Nikita Tankov	23	3	7+12	2	1+2	1	0+1	0
Players away on loan:
Players who left Alashkert during the season:
4	DF	(North Macedonia) MKD	Risto Mitrevski	6	0	4	0	1	0	1	0
11	MF	(Armenia) ARM	Vahagn Hayrapetyan	1	0	0+1	0	0	0	0	0
15	DF	(Brazil) BRA	Bryan	12	1	9	0	2	1	1	0
16	DF	(Serbia) SRB	Marko Tomić	7	0	4+2	0	1	0	0	0
25	GK	(Montenegro) MNE	Andrija Dragojević	1	0	0	0	1	0	0	0
27	MF	(Armenia) ARM	Ghukas Poghosyan	3	0	0+3	0	0	0	0	0
33	DF	(Ukraine) UKR	Ihor Honchar	11	0	7+1	0	1+1	0	1	0
88	FW	(Brazil) BRA	Perdigão	7	0	3+2	0	1	0	1	0
94	MF	(Armenia) ARM	Aghvan Papikyan	1	0	0+1	0	0	0	0	0
96	MF	(Armenia) ARM	Eduard Avagyan	2	0	1	0	0	0	0+1	0
98	MF	(Armenia) ARM	Hayk Galstyan	1	0	0+1	0	0	0	0	0

=== Goal scorers ===
Place	Position	Nation	Number	Name	Premier League	Armenian Cup	UEFA Europa League	Total
1	MF	(Russia)	97	David Davidyan	5	2	0	7
1	FW	(Bosnia and Herzegovina)	10	Aleksandar Glišić	3	4	0	7
3	MF	(Namibia)	7	Wangu Gome	3	1	0	4
4	FW	(Russia)	99	Nikita Tankov	2	1	0	3
5	FW	(Brazil)	20	Thiago Galvão	2	0	0	2
5	DF	(Armenia)	3	Taron Voskanyan	2	0	0	2
5	MF	(Armenia)	9	Rumyan Hovsepyan	1	1	0	2
8	MF	(Armenia)	21	Artak Grigoryan	1	0	0	1
8	FW	(Serbia)	98	Branko Mihajlović	1	0	0	1
8	MF	(France)	16	Vincent Bezecourt	1	0	0	1
8	DF	(Montenegro)	33	Dejan Boljević	1	0	0	1
8	DF	(Brazil)	15	Bryan	0	1	0	1
8	MF	(Senegal)	19	Pape Camara	0	1	0	1
8	DF	(Armenia)	8	Gagik Daghbashyan	0	1	0	1
8	FW	(Nigeria)	88	Sunday Ingbede	0	1	0	1
8	FW	(Armenia)	27	Mihran Manasyan	0	1	0	1
				Awarded	3	0	0	3
				TOTALS	25	14	0	39

=== Clean sheets ===
Place	Position	Nation	Number	Name	Premier League	Armenian Cup	UEFA Europa League	Total
1	GK	(Serbia)	22	Ognjen Čančarević	8	0	0	8
2	GK	(Armenia)	1	David Yurchenko	3	0	0	3
3	GK	(Montenegro)	25	Andrija Dragojević	0	1	0	1
				TOTALS	11	1	0	12

=== Disciplinary record ===
Number	Nation	Position	Name	Premier League		Armenian Cup		UEFA Europa League		Total	
Number	Nation	Position	Name	Booked	Sent off (straight red)	Booked	Sent off (straight red)	Booked	Sent off (straight red)	Booked	Sent off (straight red)
2	(Brazil)	DF	Tiago Cametá	2	0	0	0	0	0	2	0
3	(Armenia)	DF	Taron Voskanyan	5	0	1	0	0	0	6	0
4	(Serbia)	DF	Mihailo Jovanović	2	1	0	0	0	0	2	1
5	(Ivory Coast)	DF	Didier Kadio	4	0	2	0	0	0	6	0
7	(Namibia)	MF	Wangu Gome	7	0	2	0	1	0	10	0
8	(Armenia)	DF	Gagik Daghbashyan	0	1	0	0	0	0	0	1
9	(Armenia)	MF	Rumyan Hovsepyan	4	0	0	1	0	0	4	1
10	(Bosnia and Herzegovina)	FW	Aleksandar Glišić	6	0	1	0	1	0	8	0
15	(Armenia)	DF	Vaspurak Minasyan	1	0	0	0	0	0	1	0
16	(France)	MF	Vincent Bezecourt	2	0	0	0	0	0	2	0
20	(Brazil)	FW	Thiago Galvão	2	0	1	0	1	0	4	0
21	(Armenia)	MF	Artak Grigoryan	9	0	3	0	1	0	13	0
22	(Serbia)	GK	Ognjen Čančarević	3	0	1	0	0	0	4	0
27	(Armenia)	FW	Mihran Manasyan	0	0	2	0	0	0	2	0
77	(Armenia)	FW	Grigor Aghekyan	0	1	1	0	0	0	1	1
88	(Nigeria)	FW	Sunday Ingbede	1	0	0	0	0	0	1	0
96	(Armenia)	MF	Erik Soghomonyan	0	0	1	0	0	0	1	0
97	(Russia)	MF	David Davidyan	0	1	0	0	0	0	0	1
Players who left Alashkert during the season:
4	(North Macedonia)	DF	Risto Mitrevski	2	0	0	0	0	0	2	0
15	(Brazil)	DF	Bryan	2	0	0	0	0	0	2	0
16	(Serbia)	DF	Marko Tomić	1	0	0	0	0	0	1	0
25	(Montenegro)	GK	Andrija Dragojević	0	0	1	0	0	0	1	0
33	(Ukraine)	DF	Ihor Honchar	2	0	0	0	0	0	2	0
88	(Brazil)	FW	Perdigão	1	0	1	0	0	0	2	0
			TOTALS	55	4	17	1	4	0	76	5
