= Taron Voskanyan =

Armenian footballer

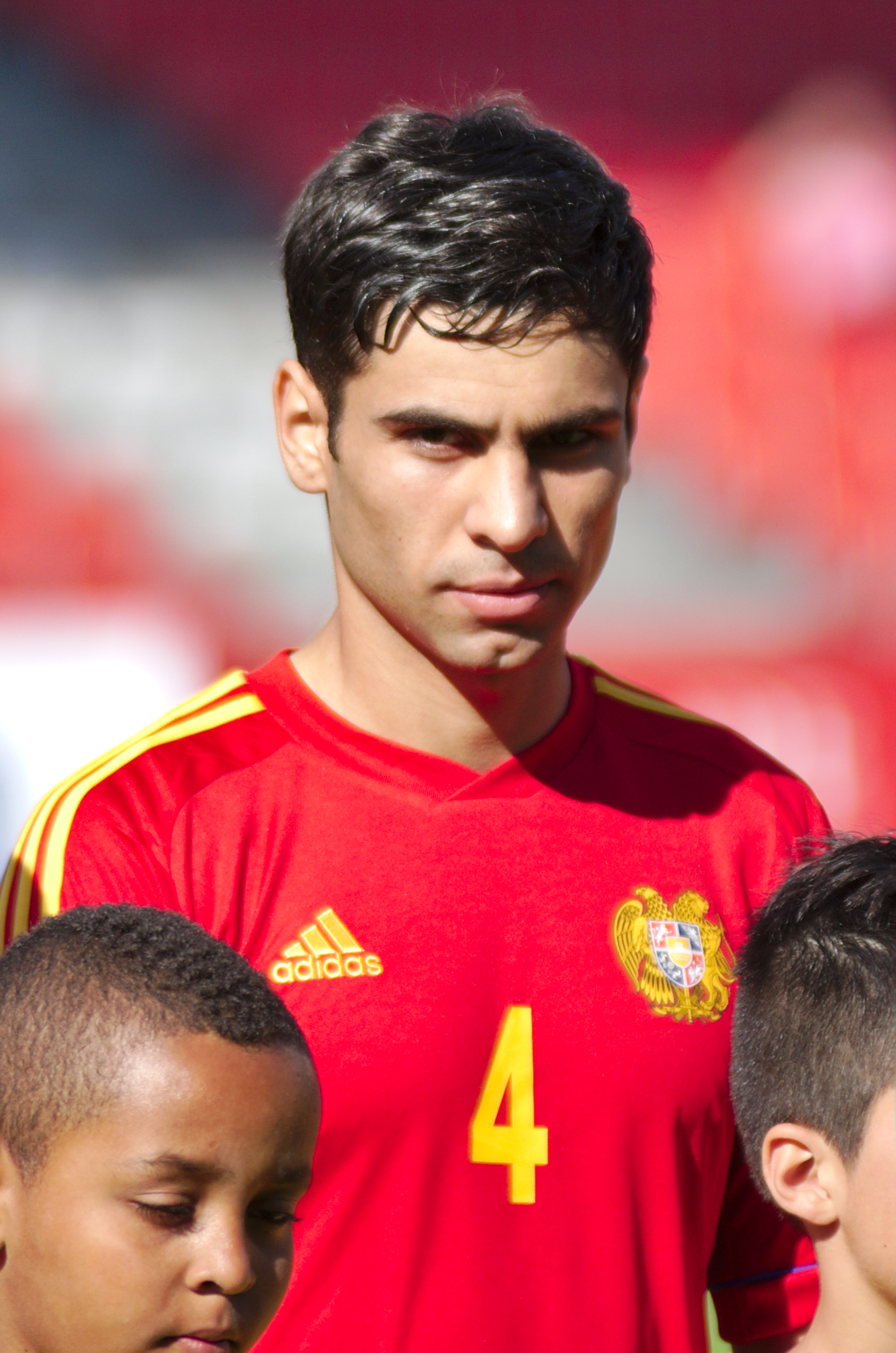
- Voskanyan lining up for Armenia in 2014

Personal information
- Full name: Taron Genrikhovich Voskanyan
- Date of birth: 22 February 1993 (age 33)
- Place of birth: Yerevan, Armenia
- Height: 1.83 m (6 ft 0 in)
- Position: Defender

Team information
- Current team: FC Gandzasar
- Number: 4

Youth career
- ?–2010: Pyunik

Senior career*
Years	Team	Apps	(Gls)
2010–2016	Pyunik	136	(4)
2010	→ Pyunik-2	8	(0)
2016–2017	Karmiotissa	28	(1)
2017–2018	Nea Salamina	10	(0)
2018–2024	Alashkert	164	(5)
2024–2025	Pyunik	20	(1)
2025–	FC Gandzasar	16	(0)

International career^{‡}
2011	Armenia U-19	5	(0)
2012–	Armenia U-21	12	(1)
2012–	Armenia	46	(0)
- * Club domestic league appearances and goals as of 18 June 2026 ‡ National team caps and goals as of 07:06, 17 October 2023 (UTC)

Taron Voskanyan (Armenian: Տարոն Ոսկանյան, born 22 February 1993) is an Armenian professional footballer who plays as a defender, for FC Gandzasar, and the Armenia national team.

== Club career ==
Born in Yerevan, Armenia, Voskanyan was a pupil of the Pyunik Yerevan football school. Having begun his career with the youth team, he went to play for Pyunik-2, the reserve team, appearing in eight matches in second-tier Armenian First League during the 2010 season. The following season, he played exclusively for the first team in the Armenian Premier League making his debut on 2 April 2011 in a 0–1 away loss against Ulisses playing the full 90 minutes. Months later, Pyunik won the 2011 Armenian Supercup with Voskanyan in the team.

On 6 July 2024, Pyunik announced the return of Voskanyan from Alashkert. On 3 June 2025, Pyunik announced the departure of Voskanyan.

== International career ==
As a player of the main team of Pyunik, Voskanyan was invited into the ranks of the Armenia U-19 junior team at 19 years of age, and first played for the team on 21 October 2011 against peers from Slovakia U-19. Armenia won 2–1. He subsequently had a few more games with the youth team.

He was a player of the Armenia U-21 team scoring on his debut on 12 June 2013 in a 4–1 win against Andorra U-21.

Voskanyan was first called up to the senior Armenia national football team for a match against the Italy national team on 12 October 2012. His debut came in the next game on 14 November 2012 a 4–2 victory against Lithuania with Voskanyan replacing Robert Arzumanyan after 29 minutes.

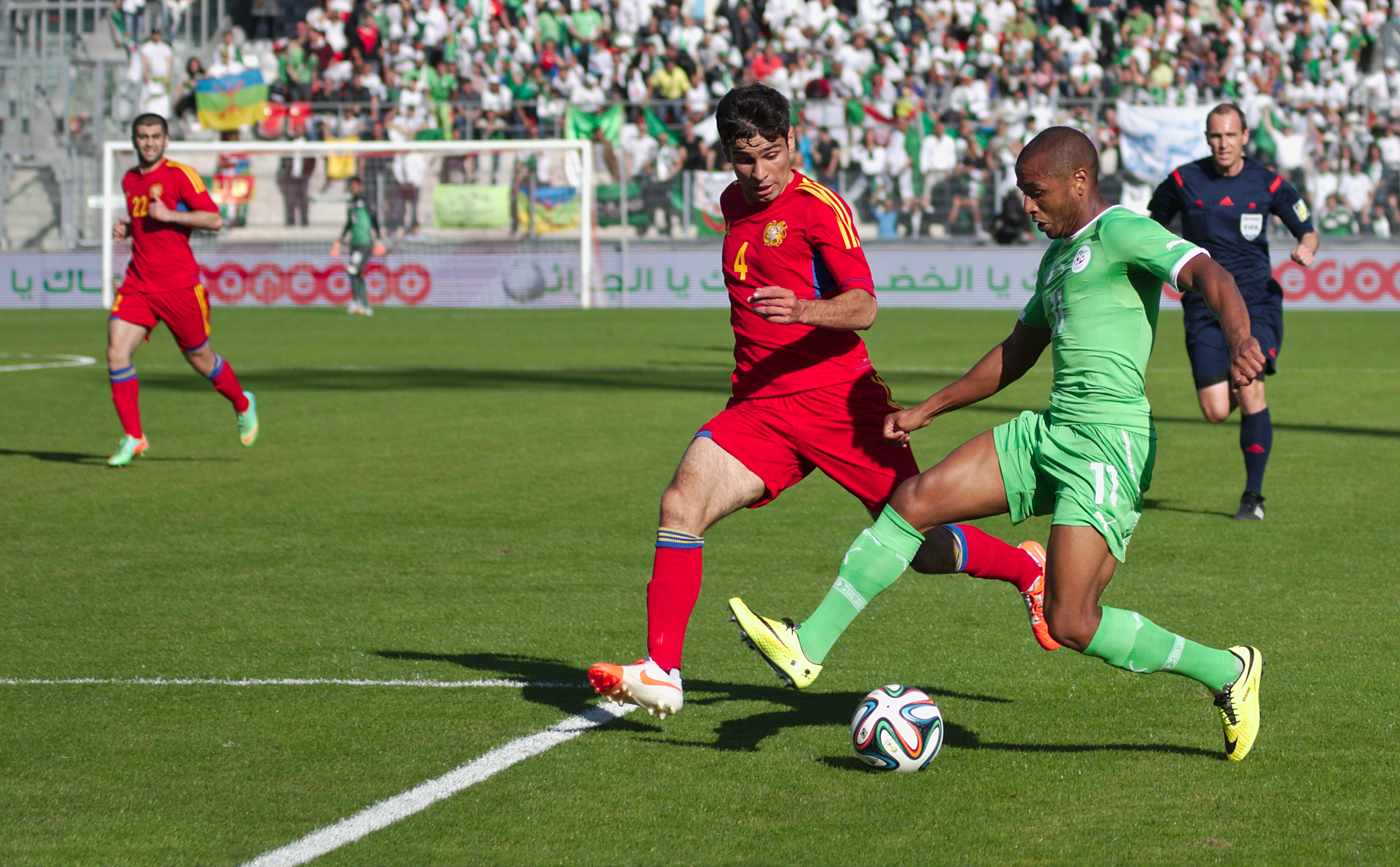
Voskanyan in a May 2014 friendly, defending against Yacine Brahimi of Algeria

== Career statistics ==
=== Club ===
As of match played 28 May 2022

Appearances and goals by club, season and competition
Club	Season	League			National cup		League cup		Continental		Other		Total	
Club	Season	Division	Apps	Goals	Apps	Goals	Apps	Goals	Apps	Goals	Apps	Goals	Apps	Goals
Pyunik-2	2010	Armenian First League	8	0	—		—		—		—		8	0
Pyunik	2011	Armenian Premier League	22	0	2	0	–		1 (Note: Appearances in the UEFA Champions League)	0	1 (Note: Appearances in the Armenian Supercup)	0	26	0
Pyunik	2012–13	Armenian Premier League	38	4	4	1	–		2 (Note: Appearances in the UEFA Europa League)	0	–		44	5
Pyunik	2013–14	Armenian Premier League	25	0	5	0	–		4	0	–		34	0
Pyunik	2014–15	Armenian Premier League	27	0	5	0	–		2	0	–		33	0
Pyunik	2015–16	Armenian Premier League	24	0	2	0	–		4	0	1	0	12	0
Pyunik	2016–17	Armenian Premier League	0	0	0	0	–		1	0	–		1	0
Pyunik	Total		136	4	18	0	0	0	14	0	2	0	170	4
Karmiotissa	2016–17	Cypriot First Division	28	1	1	0	—		—		—		29	1
Nea Salamis Famagusta	2017–18	Cypriot First Division	10	0	0	0	—		—		—		10	0
Alashkert	2017–18	Armenian Premier League	10	0	2	0	–		0	0	0	0	12	0
Alashkert	2018–19	Armenian Premier League	25	0	4	0	–		5 (Note: Two appearances in the UEFA Champions League, three appearances in the UEFA Europa League)	0	0	0	34	0
Alashkert	2019–20	Armenian Premier League	25	0	1	0	–		4	1	1	0	31	1
Alashkert	2020–21	Armenian Premier League	20	2	7	0	–		1	1	–		28	2
Alashkert	2021–22	Armenian Premier League	13	1	1	0	–		12 (Note: Four appearances in the UEFA Champions League, four appearances in the UEFA Europa League and four appearances in the UEFA Europa Conference League)	0	1	0	27	1
Alashkert	Total		93	3	15	0	0	0	22	1	2	0	132	4
Career total			275	8	34	0	0	0	36	1	4	0	349	9

=== International ===
As of match played 17 October 2023

Appearances and goals by national team and year
National team	Year	Apps	Goals
Armenia	2012	1	0
Armenia	2013	4	0
Armenia	2014	7	0
Armenia	2015	1	0
Armenia	2016	6	0
Armenia	2017	5	0
Armenia	2018	1	0
Armenia	2019	2	0
Armenia	2020	4	0
Armenia	2021	8	0
Armenia	2022	5	0
Armenia	2023	2	0
Total		46	0

== Honours ==
Pyunik

- Armenian Premier League: 2014–15
- Armenian Cup: 2012–13, 2013–14, 2014–15
- Armenian Supercup: 2011, 2015

Alashkert

- Armenian Premier League: 2017–18, 2020–21
- Armenian Cup: 2018–19
- Armenian Supercup: 2021
