= Gláucio (footballer, born 1994) =

Brazilian footballer

Personal information
- Full name: Gláucio Jose de Araujo Silva
- Date of birth: 3 February 1994 (age 32)
- Place of birth: Natal, Brazil
- Height: 1.85 m (6 ft 1 in)
- Position: Forward

Youth career
- Athletico Paranaense
- América RN

Senior career*
Years	Team	Apps	(Gls)
2012–2015	América RN	22	(3)
2014	→ Treze (loan)	0	(0)
2016	Globo	7	(1)
2016	Potengi	2	(0)
2017–2018	Globo	36	(8)
2018	Oeste	5	(0)
2018	Dunav Ruse	8	(0)
2019	Alashkert	3	(0)
2019	Nova Iguaçu	2	(0)
2020	Operário	1	(0)
2020–2021	St. Lucia	7	(3)
2021	Altos	7	(0)
- * Club domestic league appearances and goals as of 13:45, 2 January 2022 (UTC)

Gláucio Jose de Araujo Silva (born 3 February 1994) is a Brazilian professional footballer who plays as a forward.

== Career ==
Gláucio signed with Bulgarian club Dunav Ruse on 11 July 2018 on a two-year deal.

On 30 January 2019, Gláucio signed for Armenian Premier League club FC Alashkert on a contract until the summer of 2020.
