= Bryan Garcia (Brazilian footballer) =

Brazilian footballer (born 1992)

Personal information
- Full name: Bryan Silva Garcia
- Date of birth: 28 March 1992 (age 34)
- Place of birth: Belo Horizonte, Brazil
- Height: 1.76 m (5 ft 9 in)
- Position: Left back

Team information
- Current team: Itabirito
- Number: 15

Youth career
- 2010–2012: América Mineiro

Senior career*
Years	Team	Apps	(Gls)
2012–2016	América Mineiro	45	(3)
2013	→ Benfica B (loan)	6	(0)
2013–2014	→ Portuguesa (loan)	4	(0)
2014	→ Ponte Preta (loan)	28	(1)
2016–2019	Cruzeiro	24	(0)
2018	→ Vitória (loan)	7	(0)
2019	CRB	17	(0)
2020–2021	Alashkert	20	(1)
2021	Atyrau	25	(5)
2022	Astana	18	(0)
2023	Aksu	21	(2)
2024–	Itabirito	2	(1)
- * Club domestic league appearances and goals as of 19 November 2023

Bryan Silva Garcia (born 28 March 1992), sometimes known as just Bryan, is a Brazilian footballer who plays as a left back for Itabirito.

== Club career ==
Born in Belo Horizonte, Minas Gerais, Bryan Garcia finished his formation with América Mineiro. On 29 January 2012 he made his professional debut, starting in a 3–1 away victory over Democrata GV. Bryan Garcia scored his first career goal on 1 March, the first of a 2–1 home win over Villa Nova.

On 31 January 2013, Bryan Garcia was loaned to S.L. Benfica until June with a buyout clause, being assigned to the B-team in Segunda Liga. He made his debut for Benfica B on 10 February 2013, in a 0–1 away loss against C.D. Tondela. He finished the season with six appearances (five as a starter), but returned to América Mineiro after the Encarnados deciding to not buy him outright.

On 16 September, Bryan Garcia was loaned to Portuguesa, until May 2014. He made his Série A debut three days later, starting and providing an assist in a 3–0 home win over Náutico.

On 30 April 2014, Bryan Garcia joined Ponte Preta on loan until the end of the year.

On 28 February 2020, FC Alashkert announced the signing of Bryan Garcia.

On 14 January 2022, Astana announced the signing of Bryan Garcia on a contract until the end of 2022. On 11 December 2022, Astana announced the departure of Bryan Garcia.
