= Jefferson (footballer, born 1995) =

Brazilian footballer

Personal information
- Full name: Jefferson Reis de Jesus
- Date of birth: 8 November 1995 (age 31)
- Height: 1.79 m (5 ft 10 in)
- Position: Forward

Team information
- Current team: Alashkert

Senior career*
Years	Team	Apps	(Gls)
–2018	Maringá		
2018	Operário		
2018–2019	Alashkert	9	(2)
2019–2020	Machine Sazi	4	(0)
2021	ASA de Arapiraca	0	(0)
2021	Operário		
2021	Džiugas	6	(0)
2022	Banga	10	(0)
2024	Andraus Brasil	3	(0)
2024–	Alashkert	1	(0)
- * Club domestic league appearances and goals as of 21 August 2022

Jefferson Reis de Jesus, more commonly known as Jefferson is a Brazilian football forward.

== Career ==
On 7 July 2018, Jefferson signed for Armenian Premier League club Alashkert.

In 2021 he signed with the Lithuanian club Džiugas.

On 3 July 2021 he made his debut in A Lyga against FC Hegelmann Litauen. Later, he was injured and not played.

On 30 July he returned to the team and played against Banga and got a yellow card.

In January 2022 he signed with another Lithuanian club Banga.
