= Dejan Boljević =

Montenegrin footballer

Personal information
- Date of birth: 30 May 1990 (age 36)
- Place of birth: Cetinje, SFR Yugoslavia
- Height: 1.83 m (6 ft 0 in)
- Position: Left-back

Team information
- Current team: OFK Petrovac
- Number: 33

Senior career*
Years	Team	Apps	(Gls)
2008–2010	Mogren Budva	8	(0)
2009–2010	→ Petrovac (loan)	4	(0)
2010–2011	Teleoptik	4	(0)
2011–2012	Smederevo	23	(0)
2012	Tatran Prešov	3	(0)
2013	Novi Pazar	13	(1)
2013–2015	Čukarički	36	(1)
2016	Nasaf Qarshi	8	(2)
2016	Voždovac	11	(0)
2017	Hibernians	11	(1)
2017–2018	Luch Vladivostok	28	(3)
2019	Budućnost Podgorica	30	(3)
2020	Taraz	18	(1)
2021	Alashkert	18	(1)
2022	Teplice	13	(0)
2022–	OFK Petrovac	136	(12)
- * Club domestic league appearances and goals as of 17 June 2026

Dejan Boljević (Serbian Cyrillic: Дејан Бољевић, born 30 May 1990) is a Montenegrin footballer who plays as a defender for OFK Petrovac.

== Background ==
Boljević was born in Cetinje in SR Montenegro and grew up in Budva. He started playing football at the age of seven.

== Club career ==
He started his youth career at FK Mogren when he was eight. He moved up into the junior squad at the age of fifteen and made the first team at the age of seventeen.

In summer 2010 he moved to Serbia and signed with FK Partizan's satellite club FK Teleoptik that played in the Serbian First League. A year later, he moved to FK Smederevo playing in the Serbian SuperLiga.

In the season 2012–13 he joined 1. FC Tatran Prešov and played the first half of the 2012–13 Slovak First Football League, before returning to Serbia during winter break and plying the second half of the 2012–13 Serbian SuperLiga with FK Novi Pazar.

By then he became an experienced SuperLiga defender, and ambitious FK Čukarički brought him to their squad in summer 2013. During the two and a half years he spent with Čukarički, he won the 2014–15 Serbian Cup.

During the winter-break of 2015–16 he signed with FC Nasaf and played the first half of the 2016 Uzbek League.

In August 2016, Boljević returned to Serbia once more, this time by signing with SuperLiga side FK Voždovac.

On 30 January 2019, Boljević returned to Montenegro, signing with Budućnost Podgorica.

On 29 January 2020, Boljević signed with Kazakhstan Premier League club FC Taraz.

On 11 February 2021, Boljević signed for FC Alashkert.

== Honours ==
Čukarički

- Serbian Cup: 2014–15

Nasaf Qarshi

- Uzbekistan Cup: 2016
