= Oliver Práznovský =

Slovak footballer

Personal information
- Full name: Oliver Práznovský
- Date of birth: 15 February 1991 (age 35)
- Place of birth: Bratislava, Czechoslovakia
- Height: 1.87 m (6 ft 2 in)
- Position: Centre-back

Youth career
- Inter Bratislava
- 2009: Žilina

Senior career*
Years	Team	Apps	(Gls)
2009	Žilina		
2010	→ Rimavská Sobota (loan)	29	(3)
2011–2015	Ružomberok	63	(2)
2015–2017	Katowice	43	(4)
2017	Luch-Energiya Vladivostok	9	(1)
2018	Senica	14	(1)
2018	Alashkert	3	(0)
2018–2019	Zlaté Moravce	16	(1)
2019–2023	Chrobry Głogów	86	(8)

International career
2009–2010	Slovakia U19	5	(0)
2011–2012	Slovakia U21	2	(0)
- * Club domestic league appearances and goals as of 11:35, 19 June 2023 (UTC)

Oliver Práznovský (born 15 February 1991) is a Slovak professional footballer who plays as a centre-back.

== Club career ==
He previously played for MFK Ružomberok and MŠK Rimavská Sobota and MŠK Žilina.
