= Goran Antonić =

Serbian footballer

Goran Antonić Горан Антонић
Personal information
- Full name: Goran Antonić
- Date of birth: 3 November 1990 (age 35)
- Place of birth: Sremska Mitrovica, SR Serbia, SFR Yugoslavia
- Height: 1.85 m (6 ft 1 in)
- Position: Centre back

Team information
- Current team: Maccabi Jaffa
- Number: 34

Senior career*
Years	Team	Apps	(Gls)
2007–2009	LSK Laćarak		
2009–2010	Palić	24	(1)
2010–2016	Spartak Subotica	160	(4)
2016–2017	Nea Salamina	28	(0)
2017	Elverum	15	(0)
2018–2019	Alashkert	13	(0)
2019–2024	TSC	141	(5)
2024–2025	Hapoel Tel Aviv	31	(2)
2025	Velež Mostar	11	(0)
2026–	Maccabi Jaffa	16	(1)
- * Club domestic league appearances and goals as of 24 June 2026

Goran Antonić (Serbian Cyrillic: Горан Антонић; born 3 November 1990) is a Serbian professional footballer who plays for Maccabi Jaffa as a defender.

== Career ==
On 5 June 2019, Antonić was released by FC Alashkert.

== Statistics ==
As of 22 May 2016

Club performance			League		Cup		Continental		Total	
Season	Club	League	Apps	Goals	Apps	Goals	Apps	Goals	Apps	Goals
Serbia			League		Serbian Cup		Europe		Total	
2010–11	Spartak Subotica	Serbian SuperLiga	29	1	3	0	3	0	35	1
2011–12	Spartak Subotica	Serbian SuperLiga	14	0	2	0	0	0	16	0
2012–13	Spartak Subotica	Serbian SuperLiga	25	0	3	0	0	0	28	0
2013–14	Spartak Subotica	Serbian SuperLiga	28	1	5	0	0	0	33	1
2014–15	Spartak Subotica	Serbian SuperLiga	29	0	2	0	0	0	31	0
2015–16	Spartak Subotica	Serbian SuperLiga	35	2	4	0	0	0	39	2
2016–17	Nea Salamina	Cypriot First Division	28	0	0	0	0	0	28	0
2017	Elverum	Norwegian First Division	15	0	1	0	0	0	16	0
Career total			203	4	20	0	3	0	226	4

== Honours ==
Alashkert

- Armenian Cup (1): 2018–19
