= César Romero (soccer, born 1989) =

Mexican-American footballer

Personal information
- Full name: César Romero Zamora
- Date of birth: August 2, 1989 (age 37)
- Place of birth: Chula Vista, California, United States
- Height: 5 ft 10 in (1.78 m)
- Position: Forward

Youth career
- 2004–2007: Tigres UANL

Senior career*
Years	Team	Apps	(Gls)
2008–2010	TSG Thannhausen		
2011	Murciélagos		
2011–2012	Revolución Tijuana (indoor)	7	(33)
2012–2014	Chivas USA	12	(0)
2012	Toros Mexico (indoor)	1	(2)
2014–2015	Pyunik	25	(21)
2015	Vardar	8	(4)
2016	Coras Tepic	8	(0)
2017	Mosta	5	(0)
2018	Alashkert	6	(0)
2019–2020	San Diego Sockers (indoor)	4	(0)
2021	San Diego 1904	5	(2)
- * Club domestic league appearances and goals as of 1 April 2023

César Romero Zamora (born August 2, 1989) is an American soccer player who last played for San Diego 1904 FC in the National Independent Soccer Association.

== Career ==
Born in Chula Vista, California, Romero began his career in his family's homeland when he was 15 at Tigres UANL. He was later with Murciélagos of the Segunda División de México in 2011. Romero also spent time playing in the Premier Arena Soccer League for Revolucion Tijuana, where he scored nine goals in one match, and summed 33 goals in four games while playing for the indoor soccer team, breaking a record within the league. He returned to the United States a few years later and represented the country at several youth levels.

Chivas USA signed Romero on February 22, 2012, after trialling with the club during their pre-season. Romero made his debut for Chivas USA of Major League Soccer as a 59th-minute substitute during a 1–0 loss against Houston Dynamo on March 11, 2012. He was released by Chivas USA on February 14, 2013.

In August 2014, following a two-week trial, Romero signed for Armenian Premier League side FC Pyunik. He was the Armenian Premier league top goalscorer for the 2014–2015 season. After the end of the season, he signed with the Bucket Group and transferred to FK Vardar in Macedonia.

On 12 December 2015 Coras de Tepic owner José Luis Higuera announced on his official Twitter account that Romero reached an agreement with him to join the Nayarit-based side. Higuera, who works under C.D. Guadalajara owner Jorge Vergara, also announced that Romero could join Guadalajara in the future if he has good performances with Tepic. Although he was born in the United States, Romero is still eligible to join the club since he was never cap-tied with the senior U.S. national team. Despite playing for U.S. youth squads, he has stated in interviews that he would like to play for the Mexico national team if the opportunity arrives.

On 31 January 2017, Romero signed for Maltese Premier League side Mosta.

Romero returned to Armenia on 7 July 2018, signing for FC Alashkert, but was released from his contract on 1 December 2018.

Romero made his return to the indoor game in 2019 by signing with the San Diego Sockers.

In 2021, Romero joined National Independent Soccer Association side San Diego 1904 FC ahead of the spring 2021 season.

== Career statistics ==
As of match played 28 November 2018

Club	Season	League			National Cup		Continental		Other		Total	
Club	Season	Division	Apps	Goals	Apps	Goals	Apps	Goals	Apps	Goals	Apps	Goals
Chivas USA	2012	MLS	12	0	2	2	-		-		14	2
Pyunik	2014–15	Armenian Premier League	25	21	5	5	0	0	-		30	26
Pyunik	2015–16	Armenian Premier League	0	0	0	0	3	1	-		3	1
Pyunik	Total		25	21	5	5	3	1	-	-	33	27
Vardar	2015–16	1.MFL	8	4	1	0	0	0	-		9	4
Coras	2015–16	Ascenso MX	8	0	5	1	-		-		13	1
Coras	2016–17	Ascenso MX	0	0	0	0	-		-		0	0
Coras	Total		8	0	5	1	-	-	-	-	13	1
Mosta	2016–17	Maltese Premier League	5	0	0	0	-		-		5	0
Alashkert	2018–19	Armenian Premier League	6	0	2	0	4	0	1	0	13	0
Career total			64	25	15	10	5	1	1	0	87	34

== Honors ==
=== Club ===
Pyunik

- Armenian Premier League (1): 2014–15
- Armenian Independence Cup (1): 2014–15

=== Individual ===
- 2014–15 Armenian Premier League top goalscorer: 27
