= Danilo Sekulić =

Serbian footballer

Personal information
- Date of birth: 18 April 1990 (age 36)
- Place of birth: Sombor, SFR Yugoslavia
- Height: 1.81 m (5 ft 11 in)
- Position: Midfielder

Youth career
- Vojvodina

Senior career*
| Years | Team | Apps | (Gls) |
| 2008–2010 | Vojvodina | 0 | (0) |
| 2008–2010 | → Proleter Novi Sad (loan) | 41 | (1) |
| 2010–2012 | Proleter Novi Sad | 64 | (14) |
| 2012–2013 | Hajduk Kula | 29 | (3) |
| 2013–2014 | Voždovac | 31 | (4) |
| 2014–2016 | Vojvodina | 50 | (3) |
| 2016–2019 | Debrecen | 21 | (0) |
| 2018–2019 | → Alashkert (loan) | 17 | (1) |
| 2019–2020 | Mladost Lučani | 9 | (0) |
| 2020 | Barito Putera | 3 | (0) |
| 2021 | Kabel | 15 | (0) |
| 2021–2022 | Mladost Novi Sad | 44 | (3) |
| 2023 | Radnički Beograd | 14 | (0) |
| Total | | 338 | (29) |
- * Club domestic league appearances and goals as of 8 June 2025

Danilo Sekulić (Serbian Cyrillic: Данило Секулић; born 18 April 1990) is a Serbian retired footballer who plays as a midfielder.

== Career ==
He passed through all categories of Vojvodina, but, he never got a chance in first team. He has gained experience playing for Proleter Novi Sad, where he was one of the best players. Hajduk Kula brought him to their team, but he played just one season, because this club dropped from participation in Serbian SuperLiga of non-football reasons. In summer of 2013, he joined to Voždovac as free agent.

== Statistics ==
As of 24 February 2018

| Club | Season | League | | Cup | | Europe | | Other | | Total | |
| Club | Season | Apps | Goals | Apps | Goals | Apps | Goals | Apps | Goals | Apps | Goals |
|---|---|---|---|---|---|---|---|---|---|---|---|
| Proleter Novi Sad | 2008–09 | 18 | 0 | 0 | 0 | 0 | 0 | 0 | 0 | 18 | 0 |
| Proleter Novi Sad | 2009–10 | 23 | 1 | 0 | 0 | 0 | 0 | 0 | 0 | 23 | 1 |
| Proleter Novi Sad | 2010–11 | 33 | 6 | 1 | 0 | 0 | 0 | 0 | 0 | 34 | 6 |
| Proleter Novi Sad | 2011–12 | 31 | 8 | 1 | 0 | 0 | 0 | 0 | 0 | 32 | 8 |
| Proleter Novi Sad | Total | 105 | 15 | 2 | 0 | 0 | 0 | 0 | 0 | 107 | 15 |
| Hajduk Kula | 2012–13 | 29 | 3 | 2 | 0 | 0 | 0 | 0 | 0 | 31 | 3 |
| Hajduk Kula | Total | 29 | 3 | 2 | 0 | 0 | 0 | 0 | 0 | 31 | 3 |
| Voždovac | 2013–14 | 28 | 4 | 1 | 0 | 0 | 0 | 0 | 0 | 29 | 4 |
| Voždovac | 2014–15 | 3 | 0 | 0 | 0 | 0 | 0 | 0 | 0 | 3 | 0 |
| Voždovac | Total | 31 | 4 | 1 | 0 | 0 | 0 | 0 | 0 | 32 | 4 |
| Vojvodina | 2014–15 | 17 | 0 | 3 | 0 | 0 | 0 | 0 | 0 | 20 | 0 |
| Vojvodina | 2015–16 | 33 | 3 | 1 | 0 | 8 | 0 | 0 | 0 | 42 | 3 |
| Vojvodina | Total | 50 | 3 | 4 | 0 | 8 | 0 | 0 | 0 | 62 | 3 |
| Debrecen | 2016–17 | 19 | 0 | 0 | 0 | 3 | 1 | 0 | 0 | 22 | 1 |
| Debrecen | 2017–18 | 2 | 0 | 3 | 2 | 0 | 0 | 0 | 0 | 5 | 2 |
| Debrecen | Total | 21 | 0 | 3 | 2 | 3 | 1 | 0 | 0 | 27 | 3 |
| Career total | | 236 | 25 | 12 | 2 | 11 | 1 | 0 | 0 | 259 | 28 |

== Honours ==
Proleter Novi Sad

- Serbian League Vojvodina: 2008–09
