= Gustavo Marmentini =

Brazilian footballer (born 1994)

Personal information
- Full name: Gustavo Marmentini dos Santos
- Date of birth: 8 March 1994 (age 32)
- Place of birth: Cascavel, Brazil
- Height: 1.79 m (5 ft 10 in)
- Positions: Winger; attacking midfielder

Team information
- Current team: Alashkert
- Number: 11

Youth career
- Atlético Paranaense

Senior career*
Years	Team	Apps	(Gls)
2014–2020	Atlético Paranaense	9	(0)
2014	→ Delhi Dynamos (loan)	13	(5)
2015	→ Guaratinguetá (loan)	1	(0)
2015	→ Delhi Dynamos (loan)	16	(3)
2016	→ Luverdense (loan)	2	(0)
2016	→ Sampaio Corrêa (loan)	16	(2)
2017	→ Audax (loan)		
2017–2018	→ Ittihad Kalba (loan)		
2018–2020	→ Alashkert (loan)	46	(13)
2020–2022	Hapoel Hadera	51	(12)
2022	→ Hapoel Be'er Sheva (loan)	7	(1)
2022–2023	Lamia	6	(0)
2023	→ Maccabi Bnei Reineh (loan)	12	(0)
2023	Pyunik	7	(2)
2024–	Alashkert	14	(4)
- * Club domestic league appearances and goals as of 1 June 2024

Gustavo Marmentini dos Santos (born 8 March 1994) is a Brazilian professional footballer who plays as an attacking midfielder for Armenian club Alashkert.

== Career ==
Born in Cascavel, Paraná, Marmentini graduated from Atlético Paranaense's youth system, and was promoted to the main squad in June 2014. On 12 August he was loaned to Delhi Dynamos FC.

On 14 October Marmentini made his professional debut, coming on as a late substitute in a 0–0 home draw against FC Pune City. On the 25th he scored his first goal, the last of a 4–1 home routing over Chennaiyin FC. On 1 July 2015 it was announced that Marmentini would be retained by the club to participate in the 2015 Indian Super League.

On 7 July 2018, Marmentini was announced as a new signing for Alashkert.

On 26 July 2020, he signed with the Israeli Premier League club Hapoel Hadera.

On 31 August 2023, Marmentini signed for Pyunik. On 19 December 2023, Pyunik announced the departure of Marmentini by mutual consent.

On 15 January 2024, Alashkert announced the return of Marmentini following his release by Pyunik.
