= Mladen Zeljković =

Serbian footballer

Personal information
- Full name: Mladen Zeljković
- Date of birth: 18 November 1987 (age 38)
- Place of birth: Novi Sad, SFR Yugoslavia
- Height: 1.81 m (5 ft 11 1/2 in)
- Position: Right-back

Youth career
- Novi Sad

Senior career*
Years	Team	Apps	(Gls)
2008–2010	Novi Sad	29	(1)
2010–2011	Proleter Novi Sad	7	(0)
2011–2012	Palić		
2012	Radnik Bijeljina	13	(1)
2013	Borac Banja Luka	14	(1)
2013–2015	Željezničar	49	(0)
2015	Waterloo Region	9	(5)
2016–2017	Radnik Bijeljina	29	(0)
2017–2019	Alashkert	37	(2)
2020	Čelik Zenica	3	(0)
2020–2021	Napredak Kruševac	5	(0)
2021–2022	Dečić	9	(0)
2021–2022	Tekstilac Odžaci		
2022–2023	Bečej 1918		
2023–2024	Hajduk Divos		
2024–	OFK Jugović Kac		
- * Club domestic league appearances and goals

Mladen Zeljković (born 18 November 1987) is a Serbian professional footballer who plays as a right-back for OFK Jugović Kac.

== Career ==
Zeljković started playing in 2008 at Novi Sad, after which he played for Proleter Novi Sad and Palić. In 2012, he went across the border to play in the Bosnian Premier League with Radnik Bijeljina. He later had stints with Borac Banja Luka and Željezničar.

In 2015, Zeljković went abroad to play in the Canadian Soccer League for Waterloo Region. After a season in Canada, he returned to Radnik in 2016. He won the Bosnian Cup and two Republika Srpska Cups while at the club.

In 2017, he signed with Alashkert of the Armenian Premier League. He was featured in the 2017–18 UEFA Champions League against Santa Coloma and BATE Borisov. In the 2017–18 season, Zeljković helped Alashkert to win the league title. In the 2018–19 season, Zeljković won the Armenian Supercup and the 2018–19 Armenian Cup as well. He left Alashkert in December 2019 after his contract with the club expired.

In January 2020, Zeljković came back to Bosnia and Herzegovina and joined Čelik Zenica. He made his official debut for Čelik in a 2–0 league loss against Zrinjski Mostar on 23 February 2020. On 3 July 2020, Zeljković left Čelik and joined Serbian SuperLiga club Napredak Kruševac. The following season, he remained in the Balkan region and secured a contract with Dečić in the Montenegrin top division.

After a season in Montenegro, he returned to Serbia the following year to play in the country's third-tier league with Tekstilac Odžaci. In 2022, he signed with Bečej 1918. Zeljković signed with Hajduk Divos in 2023, and the following summer, he joined OFK Jugović Kac.

== Honours ==
Radnik Bijeljina

- Bosnian Cup: 2015–16
- Republika Srpska Cup: 2015–16, 2016–17

Alashkert

- Armenian Premier League: 2017–18
- Armenian Cup: 2018–19
- Armenian Supercup: 2018
