= Ihor Honchar =

Ukrainian footballer

Personal information
- Full name: Ihor Viktorovych Honchar
- Date of birth: 10 January 1993 (age 33)
- Place of birth: Chernivtsi, Ukraine
- Height: 1.80 m (5 ft 11 in)
- Position: Right-back

Youth career
- 2005–2007: Bukovyna Chernivtsi
- 2007–2010: RVUFK Kyiv
- 2010–2011: Bukovyna Chernivtsi

Senior career*
Years	Team	Apps	(Gls)
2011–2013	Obolon Kyiv	0	(0)
2012	→ Dynamo Khmelnytskyi (loan)	24	(0)
2013–2016	Shakhtar Donetsk	0	(0)
2013	→ Shakhtar-3 Donetsk	25	(0)
2015–2016	→ Hoverla Uzhhorod (loan)	16	(1)
2016	Senica	17	(0)
2018–2019	Vorskla Poltava	0	(0)
2018–2019	→ Hirnyk-Sport Horishni Plavni (loan)	18	(0)
2019–2020	Lviv	23	(0)
2020	Alashkert	8	(0)
2021	Pyunik	13	(0)
2021–2023	Mynai	46	(0)
2023	Sūduva	14	(0)

International career^{‡}
2014	Ukraine U21	6	(0)
- * Club domestic league appearances and goals as of 13 November 2023 ‡ National team caps and goals as of 26 January 2018

Ihor Viktorovych Honchar (Ukrainian: Ігор Вікторович Гончар; born 10 January 1993) is a Ukrainian professional footballer who plays as a right-back.

== Career ==
Honchar is a product of the Bukovyna Chernivtsi and RVUFK Kyiv academies and signed a contract with Obolon Kyiv in the Ukrainian Premier League in 2011.

On 28 July 2023 lithuanian Sūduva Club announced, that signed with Ihor Honchar.

He was called up to play for the 23-man squad of the Ukraine national under-21 football team by head coach Serhiy Kovalets in the Commonwealth of Independent States Cup in January 2014.
