= Wangu Gome =

Namibian footballer

Personal information
- Full name: Wangu Batista Gome
- Date of birth: 13 February 1993 (age 33)
- Place of birth: Windhoek, Namibia
- Height: 1.58 m (5 ft 2 in)
- Position: Midfielder

Team information
- Current team: Ongos Valley
- Number: 10

Senior career*
Years	Team	Apps	(Gls)
–2015	Civics Windhoek		
2015–2016	→ Bidvest Wits (loan)	8	(0)
2016–2017	Bidvest Wits	2	(0)
2016–2017	Platinum Stars	6	(0)
2018–2019	Cape Umoya United	6	(0)
2020–2022	Alashkert	71	(4)
2023–	Ongos Valley		

International career^{‡}
2014–	Namibia	34	(0)
- * Club domestic league appearances and goals as of 24 January 2023 (UTC) ‡ National team caps and goals as of 24 January 2023 (UTC)

Wangu Gome (born 13 February 1993) is a Namibian footballer who plays as a midfielder for Ongos Valley and the Namibia national team. He is known for his diminutive size and midfield capabilities.

== Career ==
=== Club ===
Following his performance at the 2015 COSAFA Cup, Bidvest Wits F.C. signed the young midfielder on a one-season loan. He made his league debut for Bidvest Wits F.C. in a 0–1 victory over University of Pretoria F.C. Originally on loan, Bidvest Wits F.C. decided to extend his contract to long-term in 2016. Recently, he has had continuous inactivity, not making the squad against Al Ahly in the CAF Champions League. Made his CAF Champions League debut for The Clever Boys fronting Light Stars FC.

His first trophy was the MTN 8 cup.

On 2 March 2020, Gome signed for Armenian Premier League club FC Alashkert. On 24 December 2022, Alashkert announced the departure of Gome.

=== International ===
Namibian Wangu Gome was given the 2015 COSAFA Cup Player of the tournament award by being Namibia's key player throughout the entire tournament.

== Awards ==
- 1x COSAFA Cup Player of the Tournament

== Honors ==
- 1x South African Premier Division runners-up
- 1x MTN 8 winner
