= Danijel Stojković =

Serbian footballer

Personal information
- Full name: Danijel Stojković
- Date of birth: 14 August 1990 (age 36)
- Place of birth: Belgrade, SFR Yugoslavia
- Height: 1.85 m (6 ft 1 in)
- Position: Centre-back

Youth career
- BSK Borča

Senior career*
Years	Team	Apps	(Gls)
2009–2012	PKB Padinska Skela		
2012–2015	Voždovac	32	(0)
2015	→ BSK Borča (loan)	9	(0)
2016	OFK Beograd	14	(1)
2016	Radnik Surdulica	5	(0)
2017–2019	Alashkert	57	(1)
2019–2020	Neman Grodno	38	(2)
2021	Atyrau	24	(1)
2022	Neftchi Fergana	6	(0)
2023–2024	OFK Vršac	26	(0)
- * Club domestic league appearances and goals as of 31 May 2024

Danijel Stojković (Serbian Cyrillic: Данијел Стојковић; born 14 August 1990) is a Serbian retired football defender.

== Career ==
Stojković started his career in BSK Borča youth selection.

Experience is gained on Serbian League fields during several years as performer of FK PKB Padinska Skela.

He moved to Voždovac for season 2012–13.

== Honours ==
=== Club ===
Alashkert

- Armenian Cup (1): 2018–19
