= Gagik Daghbashyan =

Armenian footballer

Personal information
- Date of birth: 19 October 1990 (age 36)
- Place of birth: Yerevan, Armenian SSR
- Height: 1.82 m (6 ft 0 in)
- Position: Left-back

Youth career
- 2002–2006: Banants Yerevan

Senior career*
Years	Team	Apps	(Gls)
2007–2015	Banants Yerevan	131	(1)
2015–2016	Ružomberok	9	(2)
2015–2016	→ Dolný Kubín (loan)	9	(0)
2016–2021	Alashkert	104	(0)
2021–2022	Van	12	(0)
2022	Alashkert	8	(0)
2022–2023	West Armenia	36	(1)

International career^{‡}
2008	Armenia U19	1	(0)
2009–2014	Armenia U21	9	(0)
2012–	Armenia	16	(0)
- * Club domestic league appearances and goals as of 10 December 2023 ‡ National team caps and goals as of 20 November 2017

Gagik Daghbashyan (Armenian: Գագիկ Դաղբաշյան; born 19 October 1990) is an Armenian professional footballer who plays as a left-back for the Armenia national team.

== Club career ==
From an early age, Gagik Daghbashyan was fascinated by football. He also had the opportunity to engage in other sports (dance, karate, aikido). His passion for football was stronger and he decided to pursue a football career. At 12 years of age, Daghbashyan began to take his first steps at the football school of Banants Yerevan. In 2007, he was advanced to Banants-2 and played in the Armenian First League. In the same year, Daghbashyan debuted for Banants in the Armenian Premier League. On 10 November 2007, in the 28 round against Kilikia, he came off the bench at the 75th minute, replacing Yegishe Melikyan.

In January 2015 he joined Slovak Fortuna Liga Club MFK Ružomberok after signing a one-and-a-half-year contract.

== International career ==
At the age of 18, he made his debut with the Armenia U-21 team at the 2011 FIFA U-20 World Cup qualifying match that was won, 2–1, on 5 June 2009 against the host Switzerland U21 team. Daghbashyan would have more field time in the tournament match that took place three days later. He was again entrusted to play at the 2013 FIFA U-20 World Cup qualifying match two years later on 7 June 2011, when the Armenia U-21 team defeated Montenegro, 4–1.

He made his debut in the Armenia national team on 28 February 2012 in a friendly match in Limassol against Serbia (2–0 defeat).

== Honours ==
Banants Yerevan

- Armenian Premier League: 2013–14
- Armenian Cup: 2007

Alashkert

- Armenian Cup: 2018–19
