= List of Armenian football transfers summer 2024 =

This is a list of Armenian football transfers in the summer transfer window, by club. Only clubs of the 2024–25 Armenian Premier League are included.

== Armenian Premier League 2024-25 ==
=== Alashkert ===
In: Note: Flags indicate national team as defined under FIFA eligibility rules; some limited exceptions apply. Players may hold more than one non-FIFA nationality.

No.	Pos.	Nation	Player
2	DF	ARM	Yuri Martirosyan (from West Armenia)
3	DF	ARM	Artur Kartashyan (from (Georgia (country)) Telavi)
4	DF	ARM	Armen Manucharyan (from (Armenia) Van)
5	MF	ARM	Rumyan Hovsepyan
7	MF	ARM	Vahagn Hayrapetyan (from (Armenia) Syunik)
8	DF	AUT	Clinton Bangura (from (Moldova) Milsami Orhei)
9	MF	ARM	Benik Hovhannisyan (from (Armenia) Van)
10	FW	GBS	José Embaló (from (China) Dalian Yingbo)
11	FW	BIH	Aleksandar Glišić
15	DF	ARM	Arman Khachatryan (from West Armenia)
17	FW	BFA	Zakaria Sanogo (from (Burkina Faso) Rahimo)
19	MF	BLR	Hayk Musakhanyan
20	MF	ARM	Narek Manukyan (loan return from (Armenia) BKMA Yerevan)
21	DF	ARM	Vaspurak Minasyan (from (Armenia) Noah)
22	GK	ARM	Gor Manukyan (from West Armenia)
23	MF	ARM	Petros Avetisyan (from (Russia) Khimki)
33	DF	ARM	Alen Poghosyan (from (Armenia) Noah)
55	FW	ARM	Sargis Metoyan (from West Armenia)
70	MF	NGR	Haggai Katoh (from (Armenia) Noah)
71	GK	ITA	Valerio Vimercati (from (Armenia) Noah)
77	FW	BRA	Jefferson (from (Brazil) Clube Andraus Brasil)
88	FW	ARM	Armen Hovhannisyan (from (Malta) Mosta)
94	DF	GEO	Vazha Patsatsia (from (Latvia) Liepāja)
95	FW	COL	Bladimir Díaz (from (Bangladesh) Sheikh Jamal DC)
98	MF	BRA	Murilo Rosa (from (Portugal) Paredes)
99	MF	ARM	Narek Hovhannisyan (from (Armenia) Van)

Out: Note: Flags indicate national team as defined under FIFA eligibility rules; some limited exceptions apply. Players may hold more than one non-FIFA nationality.

No.	Pos.	Nation	Player
2	DF	ARM	Serob Grigoryan (to (Armenia) Van)
3	DF	ARM	Taron Voskanyan (to (Armenia) Pyunik)
3	DF	ARM	Artur Kartashyan (on loan to West Armenia)
4	DF	GHA	Annan Mensah (to (Armenia) Lernayin Artsakh)
5	MF	ARM	Wbeymar (loan return to Ararat-Armenia)
7	MF	ARM	Karen Nalbandyan (to (Armenia) Van)
9	FW	HAI	Jonel Désiré (to (Georgia (country)) Telavi)
10	MF	RUS	David Khurtsidze
11	FW	BRA	Gustavo Marmentini
17	MF	ARM	Artak Yedigaryan (to (Armenia) Gandzasar Kapan)
20	MF	ARM	Yuri Gareginyan (to (Armenia) Van)
21	FW	RUS	Artur Sokhiyev
22	GK	RUS	Vsevolod Ermakov
33	DF	GEO	Revaz Chiteishvili (to (Georgia (country)) Dinamo Batumi)
55	DF	BRA	Tiago Cametá (to (Brazil) Amazonas)
70	DF	BRA	William
71	GK	ARM	Anatoly Ayvazov (to West Armenia)
77	MF	MKD	Stefan Ashkovski (to (Turkey) Şanlıurfaspor)
88	MF	ARM	Aram Kocharyan (to West Armenia)
94	MF	NGR	Sodiq Fatai (to (Portugal) Penafiel)
95	FW	BRA	Agdon Menezes (loan return to Ararat-Armenia)
98	MF	GBS	Mimito Biai (to (United Arab Emirates) Emirates Club)
99	FW	ECU	Yeison Racines (to (Ecuador) Delfín)

=== Ararat-Armenia ===
In: Note: Flags indicate national team as defined under FIFA eligibility rules; some limited exceptions apply. Players may hold more than one non-FIFA nationality.

No.	Pos.	Nation	Player
4	DF	POR	João Queirós (from (Portugal) Mafra)
5	MF	ARM	Hakob Hakobyan (loan return from (Armenia) Van)
8	MF	ARM	Hovhannes Harutyunyan (on loan from (Russia) Sochi)
17	FW	NGR	Mathew Gbomadu (loan return from (Armenia) Van)
25	DF	BLR	Aleksandr Pavlovets (from (Russia) Orenburg)
31	GK	UKR	Danylo Kucher (from (Romania) UTA Arad)
33	MF	GHA	Eric Ocansey (from (Belgium) Lierse Kempenzonen)
45	FW	CMR	Marius Noubissi (from (Belgium) Patro Eisden)

Out: Note: Flags indicate national team as defined under FIFA eligibility rules; some limited exceptions apply. Players may hold more than one non-FIFA nationality.

No.	Pos.	Nation	Player
2	DF	BRA	Alemão (to (Armenia) Pyunik)
5	DF	ARM	Davit Terteryan (to (Armenia) Van)
6	MF	ARM	Michel Ayvazyan (on loan to (Armenia) BKMA Yerevan)
7	FW	POR	Adriano Castanheira (to (Indonesia) Malut United)
13	MF	RUS	Nikolai Kipiani (to (Russia) Telavi)
14	DF	BRA	Léo Silva (to Bhayangkara Presisi Indonesia)
18	FW	ARM	Artyom Avanesyan (to (Armenia) Noah)
23	MF	ARM	Zhirayr Shaghoyan (on loan to (Hungary) Debreceni)
27	FW	GUI	Mohamed Yattara (to (United Arab Emirates) Al Dhafra)
30	GK	MKD	Damjan Shishkovski (to (Bosnia and Herzegovina) Borac Banja Luka)
41	DF	BRA	Cássio Scheid (to (Indonesia) Malut United)
77	MF	ARM	Petros Avetisyan (loan return to (Russia) Khimki)
95	FW	BRA	Agdon Menezes (to (Armenia) Pyunik, previously on loan to (Armenia) Alashkert)
—	MF	ARM	Wbeymar (to (Indonesia) Malut United, previously on loan to (Armenia) Alashkert)

=== Ararat Yerevan ===
In: Note: Flags indicate national team as defined under FIFA eligibility rules; some limited exceptions apply. Players may hold more than one non-FIFA nationality.

No.	Pos.	Nation	Player
8	MF	NGR	Christopher Boniface (from (Armenia) Van)
9	MF	ARM	Gor Lulukyan (from (Armenia) Urartu)
13	GK	ARM	Poghos Ayvazyan (from (Armenia) Lernayin Artsakh)
20	MF	SEN	Moussa Kante (from (France) Olympique Lyonnais)
34	DF	MAD	Sandro Trémoulet (from (Belgium) RFC Seraing)
38	MF	CIV	Moussa Kante (from (Ivory Coast) Bokakokore Academy)
45	FW	CIV	Bi Christ Hyllarion Goore (from (Ivory Coast) Bokakokore Academy)
54	DF	BRA	Marcello Gesteira de Souza (from (Brazil) Serra Macaense)
—	MF	SRB	Marko Pavlovski

Out: Note: Flags indicate national team as defined under FIFA eligibility rules; some limited exceptions apply. Players may hold more than one non-FIFA nationality.

No.	Pos.	Nation	Player
2	DF	TUN	Aymen Mahmoud (to (Tunisia) US Ben Guerdane)
5	DF	ARM	Narek Simonyan
7	FW	CMR	Bertrand Mani (to (Armenia) Gandzasar Kapan)
8	MF	FRA	Clément Lhernault (to (Slovenia) Celje)
9	FW	ARM	Razmik Hakobyan (to (Armenia) Shirak)
17	FW	CMR	Ramses Donfack (to (Iraq) Al-Naft)
20	MF	ARM	Rudik Mkrtchyan (to (Armenia) Shirak)
24	DF	CMR	Hadji Issa Moustapha (on loan to (Belgium) SK Beveren)
30	FW	NGR	Ibeh Ransom (to (Israel) Hapoel Jerusalem)
98	GK	MNE	Nemanja Lemajić (to (Maldives) Maziya S&RC)
—	MF	ARM	Erik Azizyan

=== BKMA Yerevan ===
In: Note: Flags indicate national team as defined under FIFA eligibility rules; some limited exceptions apply. Players may hold more than one non-FIFA nationality.

No.	Pos.	Nation	Player
2	DF	ARM	Artur Mikhaelyan (on loan from (Armenia) Pyunik)
13	MF	ARM	Hamlet Sargsyan (on loan from (Armenia) Urartu)
14	DF	ARM	Ruben Abrahamyan (on loan from (Armenia) Urartu)
—	DF	ARM	Aleksandr Petrosyan (on loan from (Armenia) Pyunik)
—	DF	ARM	Hrachya Sargsyan (on loan from (Armenia) Pyunik)
—	MF	ARM	Michel Ayvazyan (on loan from Ararat-Armenia)

Out: Note: Flags indicate national team as defined under FIFA eligibility rules; some limited exceptions apply. Players may hold more than one non-FIFA nationality.

No.	Pos.	Nation	Player
5	DF	ARM	Norayr Nikoghosyan (loan return to (Armenia) Noah)
8	MF	ARM	Ruben Tigran Yesayan (loan return to (Armenia) Urartu)
10	FW	ARM	Grenik Petrosyan (loan return to (Armenia) Pyunik)
11	MF	ARM	Levon Vardanyan (loan return to (Armenia) Pyunik)
19	MF	ARM	Narek Manukyan (loan return to (Armenia) Alashkert)
42	DF	ARM	Ishkhan Darbinyan (loan return to (Armenia) Pyunik)

=== Gandzasar Kapan ===
In: Note: Flags indicate national team as defined under FIFA eligibility rules; some limited exceptions apply. Players may hold more than one non-FIFA nationality.

No.	Pos.	Nation	Player
1	GK	ARM	Harutyun Melkonyan (from (Armenia) Pyunik)
7	FW	CMR	Bertrand Mani (from (Armenia) Ararat Yerevan)
8	MF	ARM	Sargis Shahinyan (from West Armenia)
12	GK	RUS	Sergey Dotsenko
15	DF	CIV	Salia Kader Traore (from West Armenia)
16	MF	ARM	Grigor Muradyan (from (Armenia) Van)
17	MF	ARM	Artak Yedigaryan (from (Armenia) Alashkert)
18	FW	RUS	Grisha Paronyan (from (Armenia) Shirak)
20	DF	RUS	Bunyamudin Mustafaev (from (Russia) TR Moskau)
24	FW	GHA	Israel Nana Opoku (from (Armenia) Cilicia)
23	DF	RUS	Nikita Stepanov (from (Russia) Sever Murmansk)
27	DF	BRA	Pepi
—	DF	ARM	Yura Manukyan (from Ararat-Armenia)
—	MF	ARM	Karen Davtyan (on loan from (Armenia) Urartu)

Out: Note: Flags indicate national team as defined under FIFA eligibility rules; some limited exceptions apply. Players may hold more than one non-FIFA nationality.

No.	Pos.	Nation	Player
11	MF	ARM	Tigran Muradyan
12	GK	ARM	Narek Voskanyan (to (Armenia) Van)
13	DF	ARM	Hovhannes Voskanyan (to (Armenia) BKMA Yerevan)
15	DF	SRB	Milan Kostic
18	MF	EGY	Saleh Nasr (to (Albania) Teuta)
19	FW	JPN	Yuzuki Miyajima

=== Noah ===
In: Note: Flags indicate national team as defined under FIFA eligibility rules; some limited exceptions apply. Players may hold more than one non-FIFA nationality.

No.	Pos.	Nation	Player
4	DF	ISL	Guðmundur Þórarinsson (from (Greece) OFI Crete)
6	DF	BRA	Marcos Pedro (from (Brazil) Fluminense)
7	MF	POR	Hélder Ferreira (from (Cyprus) Anorthosis Famagusta)
8	FW	POR	Gonçalo Gregório (from (Romania) Dinamo București)
9	FW	BRA	Matheus Aiás (from (Portugal) Moreirense)
10	MF	ARM	Artak Dashyan (from (Armenia) Pyunik)
11	FW	ALB	Eraldo Çinari (from (North Macedonia) Shkëndija)
14	DF	ARG	Bryan Mendoza (from (Bulgaria) Botev Vratsa)
17	MF	BFA	Gustavo Sangaré (from (France) Quevilly-Rouen)
18	FW	ARM	Artyom Avanesyan (from Ararat-Armenia)
29	GK	BRA	Arthur Coneglian (from (Brazil) Grêmio)
30	FW	ARM	Grenik Petrosyan (from (Armenia) Pyunik)
37	DF	POR	Gonçalo Silva (from (Portugal) Farense)
81	MF	NED	Imran Oulad Omar (from (Israel) Hapoel Be'er Sheva)
88	MF	CMR	Yan Eteki (from (Spain) Alcorcón)
92	GK	RUS	Aleksey Ploshchadny (from (Armenia) Van)

Out: Note: Flags indicate national team as defined under FIFA eligibility rules; some limited exceptions apply. Players may hold more than one non-FIFA nationality.

No.	Pos.	Nation	Player
4	DF	POR	Pedro Farrim
5	DF	NED	Jordy Tutuarima
6	MF	POR	Martim Maia (loan return to (Portugal) Santa Clara)
7	FW	ARM	Edgar Movsesyan (to (Armenia) Urartu)
9	FW	ARM	Artur Miranyan (to (Romania) Universitatea Cluj)
10	MF	URU	Nico Varela (to (Spain) Plus Ultra)
11	FW	NED	Ilias Alhaft (to (Netherlands) Cambuur)
14	FW	NED	Paul Gladon
19	DF	ARM	Vaspurak Minasyan (to (Armenia) Alashkert)
21	MF	NGR	Haggai Katoh (to (Armenia) Alashkert)
24	FW	NZL	Logan Rogerson (to (New Zealand) Auckland)
55	DF	MOZ	David Malembana (to (Qatar) Al Kharaitiyat)
71	DF	ARM	Artur Danielyan (to West Armenia)
77	GK	ITA	Valerio Vimercati (to (Armenia) Alashkert)
81	MF	SEN	Alfred N'Diaye
88	MF	NED	Justin Mathieu
99	GK	ARM	Harutyun Melkonyan (loan return to (Armenia) Pyunik)
—	DF	ARM	Norayr Nikoghosyan (to (Armenia) Van, previously on loan to (Armenia) BKMA Yerevan)
—	DF	ARM	Alen Poghosyan (to (Armenia) Alashkert)
—	MF	ARM	Karen Galstyan
—	MF	ARM	Erjanik Ghubasaryan
—	FW	BRA	Allef

=== Pyunik ===
In: Note: Flags indicate national team as defined under FIFA eligibility rules; some limited exceptions apply. Players may hold more than one non-FIFA nationality.

No.	Pos.	Nation	Player
9	FW	POR	João Paredes (from (Portugal) Feirense)
21	FW	BRA	Agdon Menezes (from Ararat-Armenia)
22	DF	BRA	Alemão (from Ararat-Armenia)
23	MF	BRA	Vagner Gonçalves (from (Georgia (country)) Dinamo Tbilisi, previously on loan)
33	DF	ARM	Taron Voskanyan (from (Armenia) Alashkert)
66	MF	POR	Martim Maia (from (Portugal) Santa Clara)
77	MF	NGR	Sani Buhari (from (Armenia) Van)
90	FW	UKR	Vladyslav Kulach (from (Azerbaijan) Zira)
92	MF	HAI	Bryan Alceus (from (Cyprus) Doxa Katokopias)
—	DF	ARM	Ishkhan Darbinyan (loan return from (Armenia) BKMA Yerevan)
—	MF	ARM	Petros Alekyan (loan return from (Armenia) Shirak)

Out: Note: Flags indicate national team as defined under FIFA eligibility rules; some limited exceptions apply. Players may hold more than one non-FIFA nationality.

No.	Pos.	Nation	Player
9	MF	ARM	Artak Dashyan (to (Armenia) Noah)
11	MF	ARM	Hovhannes Harutyunyan (loan return to (Russia) Sochi)
19	DF	BIH	Tarik Isić (to (Bosnia and Herzegovina) Sloboda Tuzla)
19	FW	ARM	Levon Vardanyan (to (Armenia) Van, previously on loan to (Armenia) BKMA Yerevan)
28	FW	NED	Sam Hendriks
33	MF	ARM	Harutyun Asatryan
37	FW	ARM	Vrezh Chiloyan
40	DF	ARM	Ashot Mikaelyan
90	FW	UKR	Vladyslav Kulach
—	GK	ARM	Harutyun Melkonyan (to (Armenia) Gandzasar Kapan, previously on loan to (Armenia) Noah)
—	DF	ARM	Hrachya Sargsyan (on loan to (Armenia) BKMA Yerevan)
—	DF	ARM	Artur Mikhaelyan (on loan to (Armenia) BKMA Yerevan)
—	DF	ARM	Aleksandr Petrosyan (on loan to (Armenia) BKMA Yerevan)
—	MF	ARM	Armen Adamyan
—	FW	ARM	Grenik Petrosyan (to (Armenia) Noah, previously on loan to (Armenia) BKMA Yerevan)

=== Shirak ===
In: Note: Flags indicate national team as defined under FIFA eligibility rules; some limited exceptions apply. Players may hold more than one non-FIFA nationality.

No.	Pos.	Nation	Player
10	FW	ARM	Razmik Hakobyan (from (Armenia) Ararat Yerevan)
20	MF	ARM	Rudik Mkrtchyan (from (Armenia) Ararat Yerevan)

Out: Note: Flags indicate national team as defined under FIFA eligibility rules; some limited exceptions apply. Players may hold more than one non-FIFA nationality.

No.	Pos.	Nation	Player
15	DF	ARM	Arsen Sadoyan (to (Armenia) Van)
51	MF	ARM	Petros Alekyan (loan return to (Armenia) Pyunik)
—	GK	RUS	Yegor Achinov

=== Urartu ===
In: Note: Flags indicate national team as defined under FIFA eligibility rules; some limited exceptions apply. Players may hold more than one non-FIFA nationality.

No.	Pos.	Nation	Player
1	GK	ARM	Gor Matinyan (from (Armenia) BKMA Yerevan)
14	MF	UKR	Artem Polyarus (from (Poland) Zagłębie Sosnowiec)
16	DF	NGR	Barry Isaac (loan return from West Armenia)
18	FW	RUS	Anton Kilin (from (Russia) Akron Tolyatti)
34	MF	MAR	Ayoub Abou (from (Bulgaria) Pirin Blagoevgrad)
77	FW	ARM	Edgar Movsesyan (from (Armenia) Noah)
85	FW	RUS	Ivan Ignatyev (from (Serbia) Železničar Pančevo)

Out: Note: Flags indicate national team as defined under FIFA eligibility rules; some limited exceptions apply. Players may hold more than one non-FIFA nationality.

No.	Pos.	Nation	Player
4	DF	UKR	Yevhen Tsymbalyuk
5	MF	BFA	Dramane Salou (to (Israel) Hapoel Haifa)
8	MF	RUS	Denis Glushakov (to (Russia) Khimki)
13	MF	RUS	Vladislav Panteleyev (to (Russia) Medialiga)
17	FW	RUS	Aleksandr Dolgov
19	FW	RUS	Nikolai Prudnikov (to (Russia) Volgar Astrakhan)
20	DF	MNE	Periša Pešukić (to (Montenegro) Arsenal Tivat)
24	DF	SRB	Uroš Stojanović (to (Serbia) Železničar Pančevo)
30	FW	ARG	Álvaro Veliez
31	GK	RUS	Dmitry Abakumov
77	MF	RUS	Temur Dzhikiya (loan return to (Russia) Volga Ulyanovsk)
—	MF	ARM	Ruben Tigran Yesayan (to (Armenia) Syunik, previously on loan to (Armenia) BKMA Yerevan)
—	MF	ARM	Gor Lulukyan (to (Armenia) Ararat Yerevan, previously on loan to (Armenia) BKMA Yerevan)
—	DF	ARM	Ruben Abrahamyan (on loan to (Armenia) BKMA Yerevan)
—	MF	ARM	Karen Davtyan (on loan to (Armenia) Gandzasar Kapan)
—	MF	ARM	Artur Israelyan (on loan to West Armenia)
—	MF	ARM	Hamlet Sargsyan (on loan to (Armenia) BKMA Yerevan)

=== Van ===
In: Note: Flags indicate national team as defined under FIFA eligibility rules; some limited exceptions apply. Players may hold more than one non-FIFA nationality.

No.	Pos.	Nation	Player
2	DF	ARM	Serob Grigoryan (from (Armenia) Alashkert)
3	DF	NGR	Emmanuel John (on loan from (Bulgaria) Botev Plovdiv)
4	DF	ARM	Norayr Nikoghosyan (from (Armenia) Noah)
5	DF	ARM	Davit Terteryan (from Ararat-Armenia)
6	MF	RUS	Yaroslav Matyukhin (from (Russia) FDC Vista Gelendzhik)
7	MF	ARM	Karen Nalbandyan (from (Armenia) Alashkert)
8	MF	ARM	Yuri Gareginyan (from (Armenia) Alashkert)
9	FW	NGR	Jesse Akila (from (Slovakia) AS Trenčín)
10	MF	GHA	John Batigi (on loan from (Bulgaria) Botev Plovdiv)
13	GK	ARM	Narek Voskanyan (from (Armenia) Gandzasar Kapan)
14	MF	NGR	Izuchukwu Okonkwo (on loan from (Bulgaria) Botev Plovdiv)
15	DF	ARM	Arsen Sadoyan (from (Armenia) Shirak)
17	FW	ARM	Levon Vardanyan (from (Armenia) Pyunik)
19	MF	CIV	Aliun Junior Dosso (from (Ivory Coast) Stars Olympic)
20	MF	NGR	Olawale Farayola
22	DF	ARM	Robert Hakobyan (from West Armenia)
23	DF	NGR	Clever Ime Sampson (from (Nigeria) Dakkada)
27	DF	SLE	Citta Ba (from (Russia) FDC Vista Gelendzhik)
31	GK	RUS	Daniil Polyanski (from (Russia) Sibir Novosibirsk)
44	DF	BRA	Klaidher Macedo (from (Bulgaria) Krumovgrad)
77	MF	GAM	Kajally Drammeh (from (South Africa) Cape Town City)
96	GK	RUS	Amir Idrisov (from (Russia) FDC Vista Gelendzhik)
99	FW	GUI	Mamadou Diallo
—	MF	NGR	Suleiman Idris (from (Nigeria) GBS Academy)
—	FW	NGR	Ibrahim Yusuf (from (Nigeria) Sunshine Stars)

Out: Note: Flags indicate national team as defined under FIFA eligibility rules; some limited exceptions apply. Players may hold more than one non-FIFA nationality.

No.	Pos.	Nation	Player
1	GK	SRB	Miloš Čupić (to (Bhutan) Paro)
2	DF	ARM	Hovhannes Nazaryan
5	DF	SRB	Nemanja Kojčić (to (Serbia) Tekstilac Odžaci)
6	DF	ARM	Armen Manucharyan (to (Armenia) Alashkert)
7	MF	ARM	Edgar Piloyan (to (Bulgaria) Botev Plovdiv)
8	DF	COL	Jefferson Granado (loan return to (Bulgaria) Botev Plovdiv)
9	MF	ARM	Benik Hovhannisyan (to (Armenia) Alashkert)
10	FW	CIV	Ipehe Williams
11	FW	NGR	Mathew Gbomadu (loan return to Ararat-Armenia)
12	GK	RUS	Aleksey Ploshchadny (to (Armenia) Noah)
13	GK	ARM	Vardan Shahatuni (to (Armenia) Cilicia)
14	MF	NGR	Christopher Boniface (to (Armenia) Ararat Yerevan)
17	MF	NGR	Sani Buhari (to (Armenia) Pyunik)
18	MF	ARM	Narek Hovhannisyan (to (Armenia) Alashkert)
23	MF	ARM	Albert Mnatsakanyan
24	GK	GHA	Raymond Nsoy
27	MF	CIV	Josue Gaba
28	DF	ARM	Arsen Yeghiazaryan (to West Armenia)
30	FW	ARM	Hayk Ghazaryan
33	FW	ARM	Grigor Muradyan (to (Armenia) Gandzasar Kapan)
37	DF	NGR	Ibrahim Yahaya (to (Nigeria) El-Kanemi Warriors)
55	MF	ARM	Hakob Hakobyan (loan return to Ararat-Armenia)
70	FW	NGR	Olaoluwa Ojetunde (to (Georgia (country)) Telavi)
87	MF	GHA	Collins Boah (loan return to (Ghana) Dreams)
88	MF	POR	Serginho (to (Malta) Sliema Wanderers)
99	DF	ARM	Arman Mkrtchyan (to (Armenia) Syunik)
—	MF	NGR	Suleiman Idris (on loan to West Armenia)
—	FW	NGR	Ibrahim Yusuf (on loan to West Armenia)

=== West Armenia ===
In: Note: Flags indicate national team as defined under FIFA eligibility rules; some limited exceptions apply. Players may hold more than one non-FIFA nationality.

No.	Pos.	Nation	Player
2	DF	ARM	Artur Danielyan (from (Armenia) Noah)
3	DF	ARM	Armen Sargsyan (from (Armenia) BKMA Yerevan)
4	DF	ARM	Erik Smbatyan (from Ararat-Armenia)
5	MF	ARM	Artak Asatryan (from (Armenia) Syunik)
6	DF	COL	Jefferson Granado (from (Bulgaria) Botev Plovdiv)
8	MF	ARM	Aram Kocharyan (from (Armenia) Alashkert)
9	MF	ARM	Artur Israelyan (on loan from (Armenia) Urartu)
10	MF	ARM	Tigran Sargsyan (from (Armenia) BKMA Yerevan)
13	GK	ARM	Anatoly Ayvazov (from (Armenia) Alashkert)
14	DF	ARM	Aventis Aventisian (from (Netherlands) Go Ahead Eagles)
16	MF	POR	Braima Candé (from (Gibraltar) FCB Magpies)
17	DF	ARM	Tigran Ayunts (from (Armenia) Syunik)
18	DF	ARM	Arsen Yeghiazaryan (from (Armenia) Van)
19	FW	NGR	Ibrahim Yusuf (on loan from (Armenia) Van)
22	DF	HAI	Alex Junior Christian
25	DF	KAZ	Timur Rudoselsky (from (Kazakhstan) Ekibastuz)
32	MF	NGR	Nwabueze Uzochukwu Paschal (from (Nigeria) GBS Academy)
33	DF	ARM	Artur Kartashyan (on loan from (Armenia) Alashkert)
77	MF	ARM	Martin Grigorian (from (Armenia) BKMA Yerevan)
80	FW	NGR	Sunday Victor Chimez (on loan from (Nigeria) GBS Academy)
88	GK	MNE	Andrija Dragojević (from (Cyprus) Enosis Neon Paralimni)
—	MF	NGR	Suleiman Idris (on loan from (Armenia) Van)

Out: Note: Flags indicate national team as defined under FIFA eligibility rules; some limited exceptions apply. Players may hold more than one non-FIFA nationality.

No.	Pos.	Nation	Player
1	GK	RUS	Nikolay Rybikov (to (Russia) Chelyabinsk)
2	DF	ARM	Yuri Martirosyan (to (Armenia) Alashkert)
3	DF	RUS	Matvey Guyganov (to (Autonomous Republic of Crimea) Kyzyltash Bakhchisaray)
4	DF	RUS	Mikhail Strelnik (to (Georgia (country)) Telavi)
5	DF	ARM	Edmon Movsisyan
7	DF	NGR	Barry Isaac (loan return to (Armenia) Urartu)
8	MF	ARM	Sargis Shahinyan (to (Armenia) Gandzasar Kapan)
9	MF	ARM	Aram Loretsyan
10	MF	UKR	Vladyslav Khomutov (to (Kosovo) Dukagjini)
13	GK	ARM	Gor Manukyan (to (Armenia) Alashkert)
14	MF	NGR	Julius David Ufuoma (to (Saudi Arabia) Afif)
15	DF	CIV	Salia Kader Traore (to (Armenia) Gandzasar Kapan)
16	DF	ARM	Robert Hakobyan (to (Armenia) Van)
19	FW	ARM	Sargis Metoyan (to (Armenia) Alashkert)
26	DF	ARM	Arman Khachatryan (to (Armenia) Alashkert)
31	MF	MLI	Adama Samake
35	FW	NGR	Taofiq Jibril (to (Slovakia) MFK Skalica)
37	FW	NGR	Sunday Kalu
77	MF	ARM	Vrezh Mkrtchyan (loan return to Ararat-Armenia II)
87	DF	RUS	Aleksey Kayukov
94	DF	NGR	Chukwuebuka Okoronkwo
—	DF	RUS	Vladimir Kharatyan
