= 2023–24 FC Alashkert season =

Alashkert
2023–24 season
- Chairman: Bagrat Navoyan
- Manager: Vahe Gevorgyan
- Stadium: Alashkert Stadium
- Premier League: 5th
- Armenian Cup: Second round
- UEFA Europa Conference League: Second qualifying round
- Top goalscorer: League: Levan Kutalia (12); All: Levan Kutalia (12)
Home colours	Away colours

The 2023–24 season was Alashkert's twelfth season in the Armenian Premier League and seventeenth overall.

== Season overview ==
On 26 June, Alashkert announced the return of Tiago Cametá after he'd left the previous January. The following day, 27 June, Akashkert announced that David Khurtsidze had returned to the club following a season with Urartu.

On 29 June, Yuri Gareginyan signed for Alashkert after leaving Pyunik.

On 7 July, Alashkert announced the signing of Levan Kutalia from Sektzia Ness Ziona, with Mimito Biai signing for the club two-days later, on 9 July, from Argeș Pitești.

On 11 July, Alashkert announced the signings of Robinson Flores from Metropolitanos, and of free-agent Anatoly Ayvazov.

On 23 July, Alashkert and Timur Rudoselsky mutual agreed to end their contract, whilst Narek Manukyan joined BKMA Yerevan on a season-long loan deal the following day.

On 26 July, Alashkert announced the signing of Sodiq Fatai from Sporting da Covilhã.

On 30 July, Alashkert announced the signing of William from Inhulets Petrove.

On 10 January, Alashkert announced the departure of Sargis Shahinyan, Levan Kutalia, Daniel Carrillo, Mateo Mužek and Robinson Flores. The following day, 11 January, goalkeeper Ognjen Čančarević was released from his contract by mutual consent.

On 12 January, Alashkert announced the departure of Vitali Ustinov and the signing of Vsevolod Ermakov following his release from Ararat-Armenia.

On 15 January, Alashkert announced the return of Gustavo Marmentini following his release by Pyunik The following day, 16 January, Alashkert announced the signing of Jonel Désiré from Telavi.

On 17 January, Alashkert announced the signing of Revaz Chiteishvili from Dila Gori.

On 10 February, Alashkert announced the signing of free-agent Stefan Ashkovski.

On 15 February, Alashkert announced the signing of Artur Sokhiyev from Biolog-Novokubansk. The following day, 16 February, Alashkert announced the signing of free-agent Vadym Paramonov.

== Squad ==
As of match played 26 May 2024

Number	Name	Nationality	Position	Date of birth (age)	Signed from	Signed in	Contract ends	Apps.	Goals
Goalkeepers
1	Vlad Chatunts	(Armenia)	GK	19 September 2002 (aged 21)	Pyunik	2023		0	0
22	Vsevolod Ermakov	(Russia)	GK	6 January 1996 (aged 28)	Ararat-Armenia	2024		11	0
71	Anatoly Ayvazov	(Armenia)	GK	8 June 1996 (aged 27)	Unattached	2023		8	0
Defenders
2	Serob Grigoryan	(Armenia)	DF	4 February 1995 (aged 29)	BKMA Yerevan	2023		20	1
3	Taron Voskanyan	(Armenia)	DF	22 February 1993 (aged 31)	Nea Salamis Famagusta	2018		196	6
4	Annan Mensah	(Ghana)	DF	6 July 1996 (aged 27)	Urartu	2022		63	5
27	Vadym Paramonov	(Ukraine)	DF	18 March 1991 (aged 33)	Unattached	2024		4	0
33	Revaz Chiteishvili	(Georgia (country))	DF	30 January 1994 (aged 30)	Dila Gori	2024		12	1
55	Tiago Cametá	(Brazil)	DF	5 May 1992 (aged 32)	Unattached	2023		121	0
70	William	(Brazil)	DF	11 June 1996 (aged 27)	Inhulets Petrove	2023		19	0
98	Mimito Biai	(Guinea-Bissau)	DF	12 December 1997 (aged 26)	Argeș Pitești	2023		40	3
Midfielders
5	Wbeymar	(Armenia)	MF	6 March 1992 (aged 32)	on loan from Ararat-Armenia	2023	2024	44	1
7	Karen Nalbandyan	(Armenia)	MF	14 April 2002 (aged 22)	Unattached	2023		46	8
10	David Khurtsidze	(Russia)	MF	4 July 1993 (aged 30)	Unattached	2023		87	14
11	Gustavo Marmentini	(Brazil)	MF	8 March 1994 (aged 30)	Unattached	2024		70	21
17	Artak Yedigaryan	(Armenia)	MF	18 March 1990 (aged 34)	Ararat Yerevan	2021		237	51
20	Yuri Gareginyan	(Armenia)	MF	4 July 1993 (aged 30)	Unattached	2023		24	0
77	Stefan Ashkovski	(North Macedonia)	MF	24 February 1992 (aged 32)	Unattached	2024		7	0
88	Aram Kocharyan	(Armenia)	MF	5 March 1996 (aged 28)	Vitebsk	2023		25	0
94	Sodiq Fatai	(Nigeria)	MF	4 June 1996 (aged 27)	Sporting da Covilhã	2023		35	1
Forwards
9	Jonel Désiré	(Haiti)	FW	12 February 1997 (aged 27)	Telavi	2024		14	4
21	Artur Sokhiyev	(Russia)	FW	27 September 2002 (aged 21)	Biolog-Novokubansk	2024		10	0
86	Grigor Nikoghosyan	(Armenia)	FW	28 April 2006 (aged 18)	Academy	2022		2	0
95	Agdon Menezes	(Brazil)	FW	26 January 1993 (aged 31)	on loan from Ararat-Armenia	2023	2024	47	8
99	Yeison Racines	(Ecuador)	FW	7 October 1998 (aged 25)	Lernayin Artsakh	2023		49	5
Away on loan
	Narek Manukyan	(Armenia)	MF	19 December 2003 (aged 20)	Kaluga	2022		1	0
Left during the season
8	Sergei Ivanov	(Russia)	MF	7 January 1997 (aged 27)	Zenit St.Petersburg	2022		17	4
9	Levan Kutalia	(Georgia (country))	FW	19 July 1989 (aged 34)	Sektzia Ness Ziona	2023		23	12
11	Sargis Shahinyan	(Armenia)	MF	10 September 1995 (aged 28)	Ararat-Armenia	2022		34	0
15	Arman Khachatryan	(Armenia)	DF	9 June 1997 (aged 26)	Unattached	2023		2	0
21	Robinson Flores	(Venezuela)	FW	14 April 1998 (aged 26)	Metropolitanos	2023		22	1
22	Ognjen Čančarević	(Armenia)	GK	25 September 1989 (aged 34)	Radnik Surdulica	2018		197	0
27	Daniel Carrillo	(Venezuela)	DF	2 December 1995 (aged 28)	KuPS	2023		38	0
33	Vitali Ustinov	(Russia)	DF	1 May 1991 (aged 33)	Torpedo-BelAZ Zhodino	2023		36	5
70	Timur Rudoselsky	(Kazakhstan)	DF	21 December 1994 (aged 29)	Turan	2023		9	0
77	Mateo Mužek	(Croatia)	DF	29 April 1995 (aged 29)	Kyzylzhar	2023		33	2
	Thiago Galvão	(Brazil)	FW	24 August 1989 (aged 34)	Floriana	2019		92	24

=== Out on loan ===
Note: Flags indicate national team as defined under FIFA eligibility rules; some limited exceptions apply. Players may hold more than one non-FIFA nationality.

No.	Pos.	Nation	Player
—	MF	ARM	Narek Manukyan (on loan to BKMA Yerevan)

== Transfers ==
=== In ===
Date	Position	Nationality	Name	From	Fee	Ref.
26 June 2023	DF	(Brazil)	Tiago Cametá	Unattached	Free	
27 June 2023	MF	(Russia)	David Khurtsidze	Unattached	Free	
29 June 2023	MF	(Armenia)	Yuri Gareginyan	Unattached	Free	
7 July 2023	FW	(Georgia (country))	Levan Kutalia	Sektzia Ness Ziona	Undisclosed	
9 July 2023	DF	(Guinea-Bissau)	Mimito Biai	Argeș Pitești	Undisclosed	
11 July 2023	GK	(Armenia)	Anatoly Ayvazov	Unattached	Free	
26 July 2023	MF	(Nigeria)	Sodiq Fatai	Sporting da Covilhã	Undisclosed	
30 July 2023	DF	(Brazil)	William	Inhulets Petrove	Undisclosed	
12 January 2024	GK	(Russia)	Vsevolod Ermakov	Ararat-Armenia	Free	
15 January 2024	MF	(Brazil)	Gustavo Marmentini	Unattached	Free	
16 January 2024	FW	(Haiti)	Jonel Désiré	Telavi	Undisclosed	
17 January 2024	DF	(Georgia (country))	Revaz Chiteishvili	Dila Gori	Undisclosed	
10 February 2024	MF	(North Macedonia)	Stefan Ashkovski	Unattached	Free	
15 February 2024	FW	(Russia)	Artur Sokhiyev	Biolog-Novokubansk	Undisclosed	
16 February 2024	DF	(Ukraine)	Vadym Paramonov	Unattached	Free	

=== Loans in ===
Date from	Position	Nationality	Name	From	Date to	Ref.
11 July 2023	FW	(Venezuela)	Robinson Flores	Metropolitanos	10 January 2024	

=== Loans out ===
Date from	Position	Nationality	Name	To	Date to	Ref.
24 July 2023	MF	(Armenia)	Narek Manukyan	BKMA Yerevan	End of season	

=== Released ===
Date	Position	Nationality	Name	Joined	Date	Ref
17 June 2023	GK	(Armenia)	Sevak Aslanyan	Syunik	17 July 2023	
17 June 2023	GK	(Ukraine)	Roman Mysak	Dnipro-1	4 July 2023	
17 June 2023	MF	(Croatia)	Ivan Pešić	NK Rudeš		
17 June 2023	FW	(Serbia)	Uroš Nenadović	Napredak Kruševac		
21 June 2023	MF	(Armenia)	Artak Grigoryan	Pyunik	28 June 2023	
30 June 2023	FW	(Brazil)	Thiago Galvão	Kolubara	28 September 2023	
8 July 2023	FW	(Armenia)	Artur Miranyan	Noah	25 July 2023	
23 July 2023	DF	(Kazakhstan)	Timur Rudoselsky	Aktobe		
12 September 2023	DF	(Armenia)	Arman Khachatryan	West Armenia	13 September 2023	
10 January 2024	DF	(Croatia)	Mateo Mužek	Široki Brijeg	15 February 2024	
10 January 2024	DF	(Venezuela)	Daniel Carrillo	Universidad Central	18 January 2024	
10 January 2024	MF	(Armenia)	Sargis Shahinyan	West Armenia	25 January 2024	
10 January 2024	FW	(Georgia (country))	Levan Kutalia	Dinamo Batumi	13 March 2024	
11 January 2024	GK	(Armenia)	Ognjen Čančarević	Noah	15 January 2024	
12 January 2024	DF	(Russia)	Vitali Ustinov	Volga Ulyanovsk		
13 March 2024	MF	(Russia)	Sergei Ivanov	Medialiga		

== Friendlies ==
24 January 2024	Alashkert	3–0	Zhetysu	Belek, Turkey
17:00 (UTC+4)	Fatai; Désiré	Report

28 January 2024	Alashkert	2–1	Velež Mostar	Belek, Turkey
16:00 (UTC+4)	Fatai 54'; Désiré 70'	Report	Goal

1 February 2024	Chornomorets Odesa	1–4	Alashkert	Belek, Turkey
16:30 (UTC+4)	Shtohrin 61'	Report	William 10'; Yedigaryan 61'; Nalbandyan 87'; Biai 90+1'

5 February 2024	Alashkert	1–0	Qizilqum Zarafshon	Belek, Turkey
16:30 (UTC+4)		Report

9 February 2024	Alashkert	2–4	Tyumen	Belek, Turkey
12:30 (UTC+4)	Racines; Yedigaryan	Report	Goal

17 February 2024	Alashkert	3–0	West Armenia	Yerevan
16:30 (UTC+4)	Nalbandyan; Désiré (pen.); Agdon	Report	Penalty missed	Stadium: Alashkert Stadium

== Competitions ==
=== Overview ===
Competition	First match	Last match	Starting round	Final position	Record							
Competition	First match	Last match	Starting round	Final position	Pld	W	D	L	GF	GA	GD	Win %
Premier League	31 July 2023	26 May 2024	Matchday 1	5th	36	13	6	17	54	56	−2	36.11
Armenian Cup	25 October 2023	25 October 2023	Second Round	Second Round	1	0	1	0	0	0	+0	0.00
UEFA Europa Conference League	13 July 2023	4 August 2023	First qualifying round	Second qualifying round	4	1	1	2	9	6	+3	25.00
Total					41	14	8	19	63	62	+1	34.15

Last updated: 26 May 2024
Source: Competitions

=== Premier League ===
==== Results summary ====
Overall								Home						Away					
Pld	W	D	L	GF	GA	GD	Pts	W	D	L	GF	GA	GD	W	D	L	GF	GA	GD
36	13	6	17	54	56	−2	45	6	5	7	20	22	−2	7	1	10	34	34	0

Last updated: 26 May 2024.
Source: See Results

==== Results by round ====
Round	1	2	3	4	5	6	7	8	9	10	11	12	13	14	15	16	17	18	19	20	21	22	23	24	25	26	27	28	29	30	31	32	33	34	35	36
Ground	H	A	H	A	H	A	H	H	A	A	H	A	H	A	H	A	A	H	H	A	H	A	H	A	H	H	A	A	H	A	H	A	H	A	A	H
Result	L	W	D	W	W	W	W	W	L	L	W	L	W	L	D	L	W	D	D	D	L	W	L	L	L	W	L	L	L	W	D	L	L	L	W	L
Position	10	3	5	2	2	2	2	2	3	4	4	4	4	5	5	5	5	5	5	5	5	5	5	5	5	5	5	5	5	5	5	5	5	6	5	5

Updated to match(es) played on 26 May 2024. Source: See Results
A = Away; H = Home; W = Win; D = Draw; L = Loss

==== Results ====
31 July 2023 1	Alashkert	0–2	Pyunik	Yerevan
18:00 (UTC+4)	Khachatryan (yellow card) 40'; Grigoryan (yellow card) 62'; Mimito (red card) 76'; Čančarević (yellow card) 81'; Gareginyan (yellow card) 87'	Report	Malakyan 37'; Harutyunyan 77'	Stadium: Alashkert Stadium; Referee: Henrik Nalbandian

7 August 2023 2	West Armenia	1–4	Alashkert	Yerevan
18:00 (UTC+4)	A.Loretsyan (yellow card) 45+2'; Metoyan 45+3'; Gevorkyan (yellow card) 49'; Mwijage (yellow card) 53'	Report	Kutalia 18' (pen.), 23' (pen.); Kocharyan (red card) 46'; Gareginyan (yellow card) 72'; Racines 83'; Khurtsidze 90+3'	Stadium: Junior Sports Stadium; Referee: Vardan Manukyan

14 August 2023 3	Alashkert	0–0	Van	Yerevan
17:00 (UTC+4)	Flores (yellow card) 22'; Voskanyan (yellow card) 90+7'; Mensah (yellow card) 90+8'; Yedigaryan (yellow card) 90+9'	Report	Okoronkwo (yellow card) 55'; Asoyan (yellow card) 90+4'	Stadium: Alashkert Stadium; Referee: Yura Mahtesyan

19 August 2023 4	BKMA Yerevan	0–4	Alashkert	Yerevan
19:00 (UTC+4)	Alaverdyan (yellow card) 83'	Report	Kutalia 16', 63'; Yedigaryan 58'; Nalbandyan 84'	Stadium: FFA Stadium; Referee: Zaven Hovhannisyan

25 August 2023 5	Alashkert	2–1	Noah	Yerevan
17:00 (UTC+4)	Yedigaryan 7'; William (yellow card) 21'; Kutalia (yellow card) 45' (goal) 60'	Report	Katoh 45+2'; Muradyan (red card) 56'; Glišić (yellow card) 90+2'	Stadium: Alashkert Stadium; Referee: Zaven Hovhannisyan

31 August 2023 6	Shirak	2–3	Alashkert	Gyumri
17:00 (UTC+4)	Traore (yellow card) 43' (goal) 54'; Pobulić 62'; Darbinyan (yellow card) 64'; Kodia (yellow card) 90+6'	Report	Kutalia 7', 90+3'; Mimito (yellow card) 45+1'; Khurtsidze 68'	Stadium: City Stadium; Referee: Artem Gasparyan

15 September 2023 7	Alashkert	4–2	Urartu	Yerevan
16:00 (UTC+4)	Khurtsidze 54'; Kutalia 69'; Carrillo (yellow card) 74'; Mimito 86'; Agdon 90+5'	Report	Ghazaryan (yellow card) 48' (goal) 90+1'; Teixeira (yellow card) 57'; Mirzoyan 78' (pen.); Piloyan (yellow card) 90+3'	Stadium: Alashkert Stadium; Referee: Zaven Hovhannisyan

20 September 2023 8	Alashkert	2–1	Ararat Yerevan	Yerevan
14:00 (UTC+4)	Fatai 9'; Wbeymar (yellow card) 39'; Mimito (yellow card) 46'; Kutalia 68'; Gareginyan (yellow card) 78'	Report	Faye 34'	Stadium: Alashkert Stadium; Referee: Yura Mahtesyan

25 September 2023 9	Ararat-Armenia	3–1	Alashkert	Yerevan
18:00 (UTC+4)	Kipiani 12'; Bueno (yellow card) 25'; Yattara 34'; Nondi (yellow card) 56'; Yenne 90+5' (pen.)	Report	Yedigaryan (yellow card) 19' (yellow-red card) 47'; Kutalia (yellow card) 45+1'; Nalbandyan (yellow card) 84' (goal) 90+7'; Flores (yellow card) 90+2'; Agdon (yellow card) 90+4'; Voskanyan (yellow card) 90+5'	Stadium: FFA Stadium; Referee: Ashot Ghaltakhchyan

29 September 2023 10	Pyunik	3–1	Alashkert	Gyumri
19:00 (UTC+4)	Harutyunyan 38' (pen.); Gonçalves 44'; Dashyan (yellow card) 59' (goal) 67' Davidyan (yellow card) 90'	Report	Nalbandyan 12'; Wbeymar (yellow card) 36'; Kocharyan (yellow card) 63'	Stadium: City Stadium; Referee: Henrik Nalbandian

4 October 2023 11	Alashkert	2–0	West Armenia	Yerevan
15:00 (UTC+4)	Kutalia (penalty missed) 7' 52'; Kocharyan (yellow card) 31'; Khurtsidze 45+1'; Mensah (yellow card) 50'	Report	Mensalão (yellow card) 33'	Stadium: Alashkert Stadium; Referee: Artem Gasparyan

20 October 2023 12	Van	2–1	Alashkert	Charentsavan
15:00 (UTC+4)	Yeghiazaryan 17'; Nsoh (yellow card) 28'; Boniface (yellow card) 32'; Ojetunde 64'	Report	Nalbandyan 81'	Stadium: City Stadium; Referee: Artak Vardanyan

25 October 2023 13	Alashkert	1–0	BKMA Yerevan	Yerevan
15:00 (UTC+4)	Racines (yellow card) 37'; Khurtsidze 78'	Report	G.Petrosyan (yellow card) 79'; Titizian (yellow card) 83'; A.Petrosyan (yellow card) 87'	Stadium: Alashkert Stadium; Referee: Yura Mahtesyan

30 October 2023 14	Noah	4–2	Alashkert	Abovyan
17:00 (UTC+4)	Miranyan (yellow card) 17' (goal) 19'; Mbokani 20'; Alhaft 39' (yellow card) 76'; Varela (yellow card) 70'; Movsesyan 84'; Maia (yellow card) 89'; Gladon (yellow card) 90+6'	Report	Kutalia 7' (pen.); Voskanyan 12' (yellow card) 53'; Wbeymar (yellow card) 48'; Carrillo (yellow card) 70'; Mužek (yellow card) 81'; Cametá (yellow card) 88'	Stadium: City Stadium; Referee: Vardan Manukyan

4 November 2023 15	Alashkert	0–0	Shirak	Yerevan
15:00 (UTC+4)	Mensah (yellow card) 19'; Kutalia (yellow card) 40'; Fatai (yellow card) 60'; Voskanyan (yellow card) 77'; Cametá (yellow card) 77'	Report	Vidić (yellow card) 33'; R.Darbinyan (yellow card) 38' (yellow-red card) 64'; Ghukasyan (yellow card) 40'; Mnatsakanyan (yellow card) 40'; Misakyan (yellow card) 82'; Mryan (yellow card) 90+3'	Stadium: Alashkert Stadium; Referee: Sargis Khachatryan

8 November 2023 16	Urartu	1–0	Alashkert	Yerevan
19:00 (UTC+4)	Marcos Júnior (yellow card) 9'; Sanogo 55'; Salou (yellow card) 85'; Melikhov (yellow card) 90+5'	Report	Carrillo (yellow card) 73'	Stadium: Urartu Stadium; Referee: Artem Gasparyan

12 November 2023 17	Ararat Yerevan	0–1	Alashkert	Yerevan
18:00 (UTC+4)	Ransom (yellow card) 24'; Moustapha (yellow card) 34'; Galstyan (yellow card) 53'; Mahmoud (yellow card) 82'; Lhernault (yellow card) 87'	Report	Carrillo (yellow card) 35'; Wbeymar (yellow card) 38'; Kutalia 44' (pen.); Gareginyan (yellow card) 52'; Kocharyan (yellow card) 87'; Mužek (yellow card) 90+3'	Stadium: Republican Stadium; Referee: Henrik Nalbandian

30 November 2023 18	Alashkert	1–1	Ararat-Armenia	Yerevan
14:30 (UTC+4)	Agdon 22'; Kocharyan (yellow card) 67'	Report	Ambartsumyan 40' (yellow card) 89'	Stadium: Alashkert Stadium; Referee: Vardan Manukyan

6 December 2023 19	Alashkert	1–1	Pyunik	Yerevan
14:00 (UTC+4)	Flores 43'; Carrillo (yellow card) 45'	Report	Harutyunyan 17' (pen.)	Stadium: Alashkert Stadium; Referee: Artem Gasparyan

10 December 2023 20	West Armenia	1–1	Alashkert	Yerevan
14:00 (UTC+4)	Strelnik (yellow card) 27' (goal) 77'; Caxambu (yellow card) 86'; Filipe (yellow card) 90+5'	Report	Ustinov 18'; Mensah (yellow card) 75'	Stadium: Junior Sports Stadium; Referee: Vardan Manukyan

23 February 2024 21	Alashkert	0–1	Van	Yerevan
15:00 (UTC+4)	Désiré (yellow card) 41'	Report	Yahaya (yellow card) 17'; Touré 38'	Stadium: Alashkert Stadium; Referee: Artem Gasparyan

27 February 2024 22	BKMA Yerevan	0–6	Alashkert	Yerevan
17:00 (UTC+4)	Hakobyan (yellow card) 45+4' (yellow-red card) 57'	Report	Désiré 8', 43'; Marmentini (yellow card) 45+4' (goal) 63', 80'; Grigoryan (yellow card) 68'; Nikoghosyan 75' (o.g.); William (yellow card) 78'; Agdon 90'	Stadium: FFA Stadium; Referee: Zaven Hovhannisyan

2 March 2024 23	Alashkert	0–2	Noah	Yerevan
15:00 (UTC+4)	Yedigaryan (yellow card) 31'; Kocharyan (yellow card) 45'; Agdon (yellow card) 70'	Report	Malembana (yellow card) 19'; Miranyan 51' (yellow card) 89'; N'Diaye (red card) 73'; Movsesyan (yellow card) 90+7'; Vimercati (yellow card) 90+7'	Stadium: Alashkert Stadium; Referee: Ashot Ghaltakhchyan

6 March 2024 24	Shirak	2–0	Alashkert	Gyumri
18:00 (UTC+4)	Vidić (yellow card) 63'; Mryan 83'; Misakyan 90+6'	Report	Voskanyan (yellow card) 42'; Agdon (yellow card) 58'	Stadium: City Stadium; Referee: Artem Gasparyan

16 March 2024 25	Alashkert	0–2	Urartu	Yerevan
15:00 (UTC+4)	Agdon (yellow card) 22'; Nalbandyan (yellow card) 72'; Fatai (red card) 88'; Sokhiyev (yellow card) 90+6'	Report	Dzhikiya (yellow card) 20'; Salou 33'; Glushakov (yellow card) 48'; Prudnikov 86'; Kravchuk (yellow card) 87'	Stadium: Alashkert Stadium; Referee: Yura Mahtesyan

30 March 2024 26	Alashkert	2–1	Ararat Yerevan	Yerevan
15:00 (UTC+4)	Marmentini 27', 39' (pen.); Wbeymar (yellow card) 80'; Paramonov (yellow card) 89'; Sokhiyev (yellow card) 90+3'	Report	Khachumyan (yellow card) 7'; Moustapha (yellow card) 37'; Donfack 70'	Stadium: Alashkert Stadium; Referee: Hovhannes Kalantaryan

4 April 2024 27	Ararat-Armenia	2–1	Alashkert	Yerevan
19:00 (UTC+4)	Bueno (yellow card) 28'; Yattara (yellow card) 44'; Yenne (yellow card) 76' (goal) 81'; Avetisyan 90+8'	Report	Marmentini (yellow card) 67'; Nalbandyan 90+2'	Stadium: FFA Stadium; Referee: Ashot Ghaltakhchyan

12 April 2024 28	Pyunik	2–1	Alashkert	Yerevan
16:00 (UTC+4)	Gonçalves 14'; Juričić 28'; Bravo (yellow card) 40'; Harutyunyan (yellow card) 90+4'	Report	Mensah 89'	Stadium: Junior Sports Stadium; Referee: Artem Gasparyan

18 April 2024 29	Alashkert	1–2	West Armenia	Yerevan
17:00 (UTC+4)	Wbeymar (yellow card) 19'; Voskanyan (yellow card) 86'; Biai 89'	Report	Tarasenko (yellow card) 27'; Martirosyan 45+4'; Crivellaro 63'; Rybikov (yellow card) 90+4'	Stadium: Alashkert Stadium; Referee: Davit Mkrtchyan

22 April 2024 30	Van	2–3	Alashkert	Charentsavan
15:00 (UTC+4)	Touré 51' (pen.); Kojcic (yellow card) 67'; Gbomadu 88'	Report	Yedigaryan 34'; Désiré (yellow card) 37'; Khurtsidze 90+3', 90+5'	Stadium: City Stadium; Referee: Hovhannes Kalantaryan

28 April 2024 31	Alashkert	0–0	BKMA Yerevan	Yerevan
14:00 (UTC+4)	Wbeymar (yellow card) 32'	Report	M.Hakobyan (yellow card) 37'	Stadium: Alashkert Stadium; Referee: Sargis Khachatryan

4 May 2024 32	Noah	2–1	Alashkert	Armavir
17:00 (UTC+4)	Pinson (yellow card) 11'; Miranyan 42' (pen.), 53'; Varela (yellow card) 90+3'	Report	Sokhiyev (yellow card) 15'; Wbeymar (yellow card) 40'; Biai (yellow card) 79'; Miljković 87' (o.g.)	Stadium: City Stadium; Referee: Henrik Nalbandian

10 May 2024 33	Alashkert	2–3	Shirak	Yerevan
16:00 (UTC+4)	Nalbandyan 4'; Chiteishvili (yellow card) 18' (yellow-red card) 67'; Désiré 21'; Mensah (yellow card) 29'; Voskanyan (yellow card) 32'; Fatai (yellow card) 75'	Report	Kone 30' (pen.) (penalty missed) 65'; Doh 83', 90+7'	Stadium: Alashkert Stadium; Referee: Ashot Harutyunyan

16 May 2024 34	Urartu	6–1	Alashkert	Yerevan
18:00 (UTC+4)	Sabua 8' (pen.); Ghazaryan (yellow card) 41' (goal) 50'; Gilmore (yellow card) 60'; Melkonyan 64', 79'; Prudnikov 66'; Pešukić (yellow card) 68'; Polyakov 90+4'	Report	Wbeymar 45+2'; Voskanyan (yellow card) 90+3'	Stadium: Urartu Stadium; Referee: Vardan Manukyan

20 May 2024 35	Ararat Yerevan	1–3	Alashkert	Yerevan
19:00 (UTC+4)	Moustapha 64' (yellow card) 69'	Report	Chiteishvili 45+2'; Nalbandyan 45+4', 58'; Khurtsidze (yellow card) 45+7'	Stadium: Republican Stadium; Referee: Yura Mahtesyan

26 May 2024 36	Alashkert	1–3	Ararat-Armenia	Yerevan
17:00 (UTC+4)	Wbeymar (yellow card) 15'; Désiré 90'	Report	Hovhannisyan 18'; Rodríguez 55'; Serobyan 71'	Stadium: Alashkert Stadium; Referee: Artur Gdlyan

==== League table ====
Pos	Team	Pld	W	D	L	GF	GA	GD	Pts	Qualification or relegation
1	Pyunik (C)	36	24	10	2	84	28	+56	82	Qualification for the Champions League first qualifying round
2	Noah	36	26	2	8	69	33	+36	80	Qualification for the Conference League first qualifying round
3	Ararat-Armenia	36	23	6	7	73	34	+39	75	Qualification for the Conference League second qualifying round (Note: Ararat-Armenia qualified for the Conference League second qualifying round by winning the 2023–24 Armenian Cup. Since they qualified based on league position, the second Conference League first round spot was passed to the fourth-placed team.)
4	Urartu	36	13	11	12	49	49	0	50	Qualification for the Conference League first qualifying round
5	Alashkert	36	13	6	17	54	56	−2	45	
6	Ararat Yerevan	36	13	6	17	39	50	−11	45	
7	West Armenia	36	11	4	21	43	73	−30	37	
8	Shirak	36	8	9	19	28	46	−18	33	
9	Van	36	8	8	20	32	67	−35	32	
10	BKMA	36	7	6	23	32	67	−35	27	

Source: FFA Soccerway
Rules for classification: 1) Points; 2) Head-to-head points; 3) Head-to-head goal difference; 4) Head-to-head goals scored; 5) Matches won; 6) Goal difference; 7) Less red cards; 8) Less yellow cards ; 9) Fair-play ranking 10) Draw
(C) Champions

=== Armenian Cup ===
25 November 2023 Second Round	Alashkert	0–0 (a.e.t.) (8–9 p)	Noah	Yerevan
14:00 (UTC+4)	Agdon (yellow card) 70'; William (yellow card) 90+1'	Report	Gamboš (yellow card) 73'; Llovet (yellow card) 80'; Danielyan (yellow card) 73'; Vimercati (yellow card) FT'	Stadium: Alashkert Stadium; Referee: Henrik Nalbandian
	Penalties
	Kutalia (penalty missed); Voskanyan (penalty scored); Gareginyan (penalty scored); Nalbandyan (penalty scored); Yedigaryan (penalty scored); William (penalty scored); Kocharyan (penalty scored); Carrillo (penalty scored); Racines (penalty scored); Mensah (penalty missed)		(penalty scored) Hambardzumyan; (penalty scored) Mathieu; (penalty scored) Miranyan; (penalty missed) Varela; (penalty scored) Gladon; (penalty scored) Manvelyan; (penalty scored) Malembana; (penalty scored) Maia; (penalty scored) Danielyan; (penalty scored) Vimercati

=== UEFA Europa Conference League ===
==== Qualifying rounds ====
13 July 2023 First qualifying round 1st leg	Alashkert (Armenia)	1–1	(Montenegro) Arsenal Tivat	Yerevan, Armenia
21:00 (UTC+4)	Carrillo (yellow card) 57'; Ustinov 66'	Report	Maras (yellow card) 10'; Montenegro 23'; Čelebić (yellow card) 34'; Mirković (yellow card) 58'	Stadium: Urartu Stadium; Attendance: 1,253; Referee: Ádám Farkas (Hungary)
Note: Match played at the Urartu Stadium in Yerevan, instead of Alashkert's regular stadium, the Alashkert Stadium in Yerevan, which did not meet UEFA requirements

20 July 2023 First qualifying round 2nd leg	Arsenal Tivat (Montenegro)	1–6 (2–7 agg.)	(Armenia) Alashkert	Podgorica, Montenegro
22:30 (UTC+4)	Djordjevic 58'; Mirković (yellow card) 60'; Manojlović (yellow card) 74'	Report	Gareginyan (yellow card) 33'; Agdon 40', 45+1', 48'; Racines 74'; Grigoryan 90+2'; Mensah 90+5'	Stadium: DG Arena; Attendance: 479; Referee: Oleksii Derevinskyi (Ukraine)
Note: Match played at the DG Arena in Podgorica, instead of Arsenal Tivat's regular stadium, the Stadion u Parku in Tivat, which did not meet UEFA requirements.

27 July 2023 Second qualifying round 1st leg	Alashkert (Armenia)	0–1	(Hungary) Debreceni	Abovyan, Armenia
19:00 (UTC+4)	Mužek (yellow card) 65'; Voskanyan (yellow card) 90+4'	Report	Lončar 50'	Stadium: City Stadium; Attendance: 2,870; Referee: Vassilis Fotias (Greece)
Note: Match played at the City Stadium in Abovyan, instead of Alashkert's regular stadium, the Alashkert Stadium in Yerevan, which did not meet UEFA requirements

4 August 2023 Second qualifying round 2nd leg	Debreceni (Hungary)	1–2 (a.e.t.) (2–2 agg.) (3–1 p)	(Armenia) Alashkert	Debrecen, Hungary
00:00 (UTC+4)	Romanchuk (yellow card) 63'; Dzsudzsák 77'; Bárány (yellow card) 84'	Report	Ustinov 18'; Racines (yellow card) 24'; Carrillo (yellow card) 49'; Mimito 67'; Kutalia (red card) 87'; Fatai (yellow card) 88'; Flores (yellow card) 89'; Gareginyan (yellow card) 111'; Voskanyan (yellow card) 120+3'	Stadium: Nagyerdei Stadion; Referee: Robert Schröder (Germany)
	Penalties
	Bódi (penalty scored); Mance (penalty scored); Bárány (penalty scored)		(penalty missed) Yedigaryan; (penalty missed) Mimito; (penalty scored) Mužek; (penalty missed) Fatai

== Squad statistics ==
As of match played 26 May 2024

=== Appearances and goals ===
No.	Pos	Nat	Player	Total		Premier League		Armenian Cup		Europa Conference League	
No.	Pos	Nat	Player	Apps	Goals	Apps	Goals	Apps	Goals	Apps	Goals
2	DF	(Armenia) ARM	Serob Grigoryan	14	1	9+3	0	0	0	0+2	1
3	DF	(Armenia) ARM	Taron Voskanyan	38	1	33	1	1	0	4	0
4	DF	(Ghana) GHA	Annan Mensah	32	2	14+15	1	1	0	0+2	1
5	MF	(Armenia) ARM	Wbeymar	33	1	27+2	1	0	0	4	0
7	MF	(Armenia) ARM	Karen Nalbandyan	35	8	17+15	8	0+1	0	0+2	0
9	FW	(Haiti) HAI	Jonel Désiré	14	4	10+4	4	0	0	0	0
10	MF	(Russia) RUS	David Khurtsidze	40	7	21+14	7	1	0	4	0
11	MF	(Brazil) BRA	Gustavo Marmentini	14	4	7+7	4	0	0	0	0
17	MF	(Armenia) ARM	Artak Yedigaryan	27	3	12+12	3	0+1	0	1+1	0
20	MF	(Armenia) ARM	Yuri Gareginyan	24	0	3+16	0	0+1	0	2+2	0
21	FW	(Russia) RUS	Artur Sokhiyev	10	0	5+5	0	0	0	0	0
22	GK	(Russia) RUS	Vsevolod Ermakov	11	0	11	0	0	0	0	0
27	DF	(Ukraine) UKR	Vadym Paramonov	4	0	3+1	0	0	0	0	0
33	DF	(Georgia (country)) GEO	Revaz Chiteishvili	13	1	11+2	1	0	0	0	0
55	DF	(Brazil) BRA	Tiago Cametá	6	0	4+2	0	0	0	0	0
70	DF	(Brazil) BRA	William	19	0	17+1	0	1	0	0	0
71	GK	(Armenia) ARM	Anatoly Ayvazov	8	0	7	0	1	0	0	0
77	MF	(North Macedonia) MKD	Stefan Ashkovski	7	0	3+4	0	0	0	0	0
88	MF	(Armenia) ARM	Aram Kocharyan	13	0	7+5	0	1	0	0	0
94	MF	(Nigeria) NGA	Sodiq Fatai	35	1	19+13	1	1	0	0+2	0
95	FW	(Brazil) BRA	Agdon	35	6	8+22	3	1	0	4	3
98	DF	(Guinea-Bissau) GNB	Mimito Biai	40	3	34+1	2	1	0	2+2	1
99	FW	(Ecuador) ECU	Yeison Racines	37	3	21+11	2	0+1	0	4	1
Players away on loan:
Players who left Ararat-Armenia during the season:
8	MF	(Russia) RUS	Sergei Ivanov	2	0	1+1	0	0	0	0	0
9	FW	(Georgia (country)) GEO	Levan Kutalia	23	12	16+3	12	0+1	0	0+3	0
15	DF	(Armenia) ARM	Arman Khachatryan	1	0	1	0	0	0	0	0
21	FW	(Venezuela) VEN	Robinson Flores	22	1	13+4	1	1	0	3+1	0
22	GK	(Armenia) ARM	Ognjen Čančarević	22	0	18	0	0	0	4	0
27	DF	(Venezuela) VEN	Daniel Carrillo	23	0	18	0	1	0	4	0
33	DF	(Russia) RUS	Vitali Ustinov	20	3	14+2	1	0	0	4	2
77	DF	(Croatia) CRO	Mateo Mužek	17	0	12+1	0	0	0	4	0

=== Goal scorers ===
Place	Position	Nation	Number	Name	Premier League	Armenian Cup	Europa Conference League	Total
1	FW	(Georgia (country))	9	Levan Kutalia	12	0	0	12
2	MF	(Armenia)	7	Karen Nalbandyan	8	0	0	8
3	MF	(Russia)	10	David Khurtsidze	7	0	0	7
4	FW	(Brazil)	95	Agdon	3	0	3	6
5	MF	(Brazil)	11	Gustavo Marmentini	4	0	0	4
5	FW	(Haiti)	9	Jonel Désiré	4	0	0	4
7	MF	(Armenia)	17	Artak Yedigaryan	3	0	0	3
7	FW	(Ecuador)	99	Yeison Racines	2	0	1	3
7	DF	(Guinea-Bissau)	98	Mimito Biai	2	0	1	3
7	DF	(Russia)	33	Vitali Ustinov	1	0	2	3
11	DF	(Ghana)	4	Annan Mensah	1	0	1	2
11				Own goal	2	0	0	2
13	MF	(Nigeria)	94	Sodiq Fatai	1	0	0	1
13	DF	(Armenia)	3	Taron Voskanyan	1	0	0	1
13	FW	(Venezuela)	21	Robinson Flores	1	0	0	1
13	MF	(Armenia)	5	Wbeymar	1	0	0	1
13	DF	(Georgia (country))	33	Revaz Chiteishvili	1	0	0	1
13	DF	(Armenia)	2	Serob Grigoryan	0	0	1	1
				TOTALS	54	0	9	63

=== Clean sheets ===
Place	Position	Nation	Number	Name	Premier League	Armenian Cup	Europa Conference League	Total
1	GK	(Armenia)	22	Ognjen Čančarević	4	0	0	4
1	GK	(Armenia)	71	Anatoly Ayvazov	3	1	0	4
3	GK	(Russia)	22	Vsevolod Ermakov	1	0	0	1
				TOTALS	8	1	0	9

=== Disciplinary record ===
Number	Nation	Position	Name	Premier League		Armenian Cup		Europa Conference League		Total	
Number	Nation	Position	Name	Booked	Sent off (straight red)	Booked	Sent off (straight red)	Booked	Sent off (straight red)	Booked	Sent off (straight red)
2	(Armenia)	DF	Serob Grigoryan	2	0	0	0	0	0	2	0
3	(Armenia)	DF	Taron Voskanyan	8	0	0	0	2	0	10	0
4	(Ghana)	DF	Annan Mensah	5	0	0	0	0	0	5	0
5	(Armenia)	MF	Wbeymar	9	0	0	0	0	0	9	0
7	(Armenia)	MF	Karen Nalbandyan	2	0	0	0	0	0	2	0
9	(Haiti)	FW	Jonel Désiré	2	0	0	0	0	0	2	0
10	(Russia)	MF	David Khurtsidze	1	0	0	0	0	0	1	0
11	(Brazil)	MF	Gustavo Marmentini	2	0	0	0	0	0	2	0
17	(Armenia)	MF	Artak Yedigaryan	3	1	0	0	1	0	4	1
20	(Armenia)	MF	Yuri Gareginyan	5	0	0	0	1	0	6	0
21	(Russia)	FW	Artur Sokhiyev	3	0	0	0	0	0	3	0
27	(Ukraine)	DF	Vadym Paramonov	1	0	0	0	0	0	1	0
33	(Georgia (country))	DF	Revaz Chiteishvili	2	1	0	0	0	0	2	1
55	(Brazil)	DF	Tiago Cametá	2	0	0	0	0	0	2	0
70	(Brazil)	DF	William	1	0	1	0	0	0	2	0
88	(Armenia)	MF	Aram Kocharyan	5	1	0	0	0	0	5	1
94	(Nigeria)	MF	Sodiq Fatai	2	1	0	0	1	0	3	1
95	(Brazil)	FW	Agdon	4	0	1	0	0	0	5	0
98	(Guinea-Bissau)	DF	Mimito Biai	3	1	0	0	0	0	3	1
99	(Ecuador)	FW	Yeison Racines	1	0	0	0	1	0	2	0
Players away on loan:
Players who left Ararat-Armenia during the season:
9	(Georgia (country))	FW	Levan Kutalia	3	0	0	0	0	1	3	1
15	(Armenia)	DF	Arman Khachatryan	1	0	0	0	0	0	1	0
21	(Venezuela)	FW	Robinson Flores	2	0	0	0	1	0	3	0
22	(Armenia)	GK	Ognjen Čančarević	1	0	0	0	0	0	1	0
27	(Venezuela)	DF	Daniel Carrillo	5	0	0	0	2	0	7	0
77	(Croatia)	DF	Mateo Mužek	2	0	0	0	1	0	3	0
			TOTALS	77	5	2	0	10	1	89	6
