= 2019–20 FC Alashkert season =

Alashkert
2019-20 season
- Chairman: Bagrat Navoyan
- Manager: Abraham Khashmanyan (until 4 September); Armen Adamyan (caretaker) (4 September - 28 June); Yegishe Melikyan (from 28 June)
- Stadium: Alashkert Stadium
- Premier League: 3rd
- Armenian Cup: Quarterfinal vs Gandzasar Kapan
- Armenian Supercup: Runners Up
- Europa League: Second qualifying round vs FCSB
- Top goalscorer: League: Gustavo Marmentini (9); All: Gustavo Marmentini (12)

The 2019–20 season was Alashkert's eighth season in the Armenian Premier League and thirteenth overall. After the season was suspended due to the COVID-19 pandemic in Armenia, Alashkert finished third in the League, reached the quarterfinals of the Armenian Cup and were runners-up in the Armenian Supercup. In Europe Alashkert were knocked out of the Europa League in the second qualifying round by FCSB.

== Season events ==
On 4 September, manager Abraham Khashmanyan was fired, with Armen Adamyan being appointed as the clubs caretaker manager.

On 12 March 2020, the Football Federation of Armenia announced that all Armenian Premier League games had been postponed until 23 March due to the COVID-19 pandemic in Armenia.

On 28 June, Yegishe Melikyan was appointed as manager.

== Squad ==
As of match played 14 July 2020

Number	Name	Nationality	Position	Date of birth (age)	Signed from	Signed in	Contract ends	Apps.	Goals
Goalkeepers
1	Henri Avagyan	(Armenia)	GK	16 January 1996 (aged 24)	Banants	2018		12	0
31	Gor Manukyan	(Armenia)	GK	27 September 1993 (aged 26)	Pyunik	2019		0	0
55	Ognjen Čančarević	(Serbia)	GK	25 September 1989 (aged 30)	Radnik Surdulica	2018		81	0
Defenders
2	Aleksandar Miljković	(Serbia)	DF	26 February 1990 (aged 30)	Miedź Legnica	2019		14	0
3	Taron Voskanyan	(Armenia)	DF	22 February 1993 (aged 27)	Nea Salamis Famagusta	2018		77	1
5	Nikita Baranov	(Estonia)	DF	9 February 1998 (aged 22)	Beroe Stara Zagora	2019		23	0
8	Gagik Daghbashyan	(Armenia)	DF	19 October 1990 (aged 29)	MFK Ružomberok	2016		126	0
14	Risto Mitrevski	(North Macedonia)	DF	5 October 1991 (aged 28)	Enosis Neon Paralimni	2020		12	2
18	Tiago Cametá	(Brazil)	DF	5 May 1992 (aged 28)	Vila Nova	2019		31	0
20	Bryan	(Brazil)	DF	28 March 1992 (aged 28)	CRB	2020		10	1
22	Hayk Ishkhanyan	(Armenia)	DF	24 June 1989 (aged 31)	Zhetysu	2020		36	1
25	Gor Poghosyan	(Armenia)	DF	11 June 1988 (aged 32)	Ararat Yerevan	2019		2	0
Midfielders
4	Arman Sargsyan	(Armenia)	MF	23 July 1997 (aged 22)	Youth team	2019		1	0
6	Pape Abdou Camara	(Senegal)	MF	24 September 1991 (aged 28)	Urartu	2019		10	1
7	Wangu Gome	(Namibia)	MF	13 February 1993 (aged 27)	Cape Umoya United	2020		11	0
10	Gustavo Marmentini	(Brazil)	MF	8 March 1994 (aged 26)	loan from Athletico Paranaense	2018		56	17
11	Vahagn Hayrapetyan	(Armenia)	MF	14 June 1997 (aged 23)	Pyunik	2019		27	1
12	Hayk Galstyan	(Armenia)	MF	23 March 1998 (aged 22)		2020		1	0
21	Artak Grigoryan	(Armenia)	MF	19 October 1987 (aged 32)	Mika	2015		157	4
24	Eduard Avagyan	(Armenia)	MF	21 March 1996 (aged 24)	Pyunik	2019		4	2
Forwards
9	Thiago Galvão	(Brazil)	FW	24 August 1989 (aged 30)	Floriana	2019		33	12
15	Aleksandar Glišić	(Bosnia and Herzegovina)	FW	3 September 1992 (aged 27)	Urartu	2020		25	11
17	Sunday Ingbede	(Nigeria)	FW	23 April 1998 (aged 22)	on loan from Lori	2020		2	0
19	Nikita Tankov	(Russia)	FW	20 September 1996 (aged 23)	Dnepr Smolensk	2019		34	6
23	David Gatikoyev	(Russia)	FW	14 September 1993 (aged 26)	Spartak Vladikavkaz	2020		7	1
77	Edgar Manucharyan	(Armenia)	FW	19 January 1987 (aged 33)	Pyunik	2020		31	3
Away on loan
Left during the season
4	Mladen Zeljković	(Serbia)	DF	18 November 1987 (aged 32)	Radnik Bijeljina	2017		50	3
6	Artur Yedigaryan	(Armenia)	MF	26 June 1987 (aged 33)	Proleter Novi Sad	2019		116	18
7	Mihran Manasyan	(Armenia)	FW	13 January 1989 (aged 31)	Mika	2019			
12	David Ghandilyan	(Armenia)	FW	4 June 1993 (aged 27)	Shirak	2019		3	1
13	Artur Avahimyan	(Ukraine)	MF	16 January 1997 (aged 23)	Arsenal Kyiv	2019		3	0
13	Victor Mudrac	(Moldova)	DF	3 March 1994 (aged 26)	Petrocub Hîncești	2020		1	0
14	Sargis Shahinyan	(Armenia)	MF	6 February 1994 (aged 26)	Ararat Yerevan	2018		24	3
17	Ghukas Poghosyan	(Armenia)	MF	6 February 1994 (aged 26)	Gorodeya	2018		24	4
23	Kirill Aloyan	(Russia)	DF	22 January 1999 (aged 21)	Zenit-2 St.Petersburg	2019		3	0
77	Gegham Kadymyan	(Armenia)	FW	19 October 1992 (aged 27)	Arsenal Kyiv	2019		8	1
	Akhmed Jindoyan	(Armenia)	FW	2 October 1997 (aged 22)	Mika	2016		1	0

== Transfers ==
=== In ===
Date	Position	Nationality	Name	From	Fee	Ref.
Summer 2019	FW	(Armenia)	David Ghandilyan	Shirak	Undisclosed	
21 June 2019	DF	(Armenia)	Hayk Ishkhanyan	Lori	Free	
5 July 2019	DF	(Armenia)	Gor Poghosyan	Ararat Yerevan	Undisclosed	
5 July 2019	DF	(Armenia)	Aram Shakhnazaryan	Shirak	Undisclosed	
5 July 2019	MF	(Armenia)	Vahagn Hayrapetyan	Pyunik	Undisclosed	
5 July 2019	MF	(Armenia)	Sargis Shahinyan	Ararat Yerevan	Undisclosed	
5 July 2019	FW	(Armenia)	Mihran Manasyan	Gandzasar Kapan	Undisclosed	
5 July 2019	FW	(Armenia)	Vardan Pogosyan	Banants	Undisclosed	
7 July 2019	FW	(Brazil)	Thiago Galvão	Floriana	Undisclosed	
8 July 2019	DF	(Brazil)	Tiago Cametá	Vila Nova	Undisclosed	
9 July 2019	FW	(Armenia)	Gegham Kadymyan	Arsenal Kyiv	Undisclosed	
10 July 2019	MF	(Ukraine)	Artur Avahimyan	Arsenal Kyiv	Undisclosed	
19 August 2019	DF	(Russia)	Kirill Aloyan	Zenit-2 St.Petersburg	Free	
21 August 2019	FW	(Bosnia and Herzegovina)	Aleksandar Glišić	Urartu	Free	
25 August 2019	DF	(Estonia)	Nikita Baranov	Beroe Stara Zagora	Undisclosed	
26 August 2019	GK	(Armenia)	Gor Manukyan	Pyunik	Undisclosed	
26 August 2019	MF	(Armenia)	Eduard Avagyan	Pyunik	Undisclosed	
26 August 2019	MF	(Armenia)	Artur Yedigaryan	Proleter Novi Sad	Undisclosed	
28 August 2019	DF	(Serbia)	Aleksandar Miljković	Miedź Legnica	Undisclosed	
11 December 2019	MF	(Senegal)	Pape Abdou Camara	Urartu	Undisclosed	
6 February 2020	FW	(Russia)	David Gatikoyev	Spartak Vladikavkaz	Undisclosed	
27 February 2020	DF	(North Macedonia)	Risto Mitrevski	Enosis Neon Paralimni	Undisclosed	
28 February 2020	DF	(Brazil)	Bryan	CRB	Undisclosed	
1 March 2020	DF	(Moldova)	Victor Mudrac	Petrocub Hîncești	Undisclosed	
2 March 2020	MF	(Namibia)	Wangu Gome	Cape Umoya United	Undisclosed	
4 March 2020	DF	(Armenia)	Hayk Ishkhanyan	Zhetysu	Free	
4 March 2020	FW	(Armenia)	Edgar Manucharyan	Pyunik	Free	

=== Loans in ===
Date from	Position	Nationality	Name	From	Date to	Ref.
7 July 2018	MF	(Brazil)	Gustavo Marmentini	Athletico Paranaense B	End of season	
22 June 2018	MF	(Serbia)	Danilo Sekulić	Debreceni	31 July 2019	
22 January 2020	FW	(Nigeria)	Sunday Ingbede	Lori	End of season	

=== Released ===
Date	Position	Nationality	Name	Joined	Date	Ref
4 August 2019	DF	(Armenia)	Hrayr Mkoyan	Shirak		
9 December 2019	DF	(Serbia)	Mladen Zeljković	Čelik Zenica	26 January 2020	
9 December 2019	MF	(Armenia)	Ghukas Poghosyan	Van	16 February 2020	
9 December 2019	MF	(Armenia)	Sargis Shahinyan	Lori	8 February 2020	
9 December 2019	MF	(Armenia)	Artur Yedigaryan	Retired		
9 December 2019	FW	(Armenia)	David Ghandilyan	Lori	9 February 2020	
9 December 2019	FW	(Armenia)	Gegham Kadymyan	Neman Grodno		
9 December 2019	FW	(Armenia)	Mihran Manasyan	Lori	1 March 2020	
24 January 2020	DF	(Armenia)	Hayk Ishkhanyan	Zhetysu		
31 January 2020	MF	(Ukraine)	Artur Avahimyan	Chornomorets Odesa		
31 December 2020	DF	(Russia)	Kirill Aloyan	Yenisey Krasnoyarsk		
31 December 2020	FW	(Armenia)	Akhmed Jindoyan			
10 July 2020	DF	(Moldova)	Victor Mudrac	Slavia Mozyr	10 July 2020	

== Friendlies ==
28 January 2020	Urartu	0 – 2	Alashkert	Yerevan
16:00 (UTC+4)		Report	Thiago Galvão 12'; Trialist 68'	Stadium: Urartu Stadium

1 February 2020	Alashkert (Armenia)	2 – 1	(Russia) Armavir	Yerevan
14:00 (UTC+4)	Tiago Cametá; N.Tankov	Report	Goal	Stadium: Urartu Stadium

10 February 2020	Alashkert (Armenia)	2 – 1	(Denmark) Hellerup	Belek, Turkey
14:00 (UTC+4)	Marmentini; Thiago Galvão	Report	Goal

13 February 2020	Alashkert (Armenia)	1 – 1	(Kazakhstan) Ordabasy	Belek, Turkey
18:00 (UTC+4)	Glišić	Report	Fontanello

17 February 2020	Alashkert (Armenia)	0 – 2	(Georgia (country)) Samtredia	Belek, Turkey
(UTC+4)		Report	Goal

19 February 2020	Alashkert (Armenia)	3 – 1	(China) Zhejiang Greentown	Belek, Turkey
(UTC+4)	Glišić; Miljković; Trialist	Report	Goal

26 February 2020	Alashkert	2 – 0	Urartu	Yerevan
(UTC+4)	Camara 6'; Glišić 70'	Report

11 May 2020	Alashkert	8 – 1	West Armenia	Yerevan
13:00 (UTC+4)	Glišić; N.Tankov; Thiago Galvão; Marmentini; Gatikoyev	Report	Goal	Stadium: Alashkert Stadium; Attendance: 0

14 May 2020	Alashkert	2 – 2	Ararat-Armenia	Yerevan
12:00 (UTC+4)	Thiago Galvão; Marmentini	Report	Lima	Stadium: Alashkert Stadium

18 May 2020	Alashkert	5 – 0	Lokomotiv Yerevan	Yerevan
16:00 (UTC+4)	Glišić; Thiago Galvão; Manucharyan; N.Tankov; Camara	Report		Stadium: Alashkert Stadium

== Competitions ==
=== Supercup ===
24 September 2019	Ararat-Armenia	3 – 2 (a.e.t.)	Alashkert	Yerevan
19:00 (UTC+4)	A.Nahapetyan 27'; Sanogo (yellow card) 48'; Danielyan 90+3'; Mailson 110'	Report	Marmentini 24' (yellow card) 36'; M.Manasyan 65'; Daghbashyan (yellow card) 78'; Voskanyan (yellow card) 120+1'	Stadium: Vazgen Sargsyan Republican Stadium; Attendance: 1,000; Referee: Gevorg Eghoyan

=== Premier League ===
==== Regular season ====
===== Results summary =====
Overall								Home						Away					
Pld	W	D	L	GF	GA	GD	Pts	W	D	L	GF	GA	GD	W	D	L	GF	GA	GD
18	9	4	5	33	20	+13	31	4	2	3	14	9	+5	5	2	2	19	11	+8

Last updated: 24 May 2020.
Source: See Results

===== Results =====
11 August 2019 2	Lori	2 – 1	Alashkert	Vanadzor
17:00 (UTC+4)	J.Bravo (yellow card) 7'; L.Matheus (yellow card) 13'; Aghekyan 26', 61'; J.Ufuoma (yellow card) 38'; A.Avagyan (yellow card) 62'; X.Auzmendi (yellow card) 76'; Zayerko (yellow card) 90+3'	Report	Ishkhanyan (yellow card) 24'; S.Shahinyan 29'; Kadymyan (yellow card) 90+4'	Stadium: Vanadzor Football Academy; Attendance: 500; Referee: Gevorg Eghoyan

17 August 2019 3	Alashkert	2 – 1	Urartu	Yerevan
17:15 (UTC+4)	Marmentini 20'; Ishkhanyan (yellow card) 30'; Tankov 54'	Report	H. Hakobyan 12'; Nikolić (yellow card) 43'	Stadium: Alashkert Stadium; Attendance: 400; Referee: Henrik Nalbandyan

26 August 2019 4	Ararat Yerevan	1 – 1	Alashkert	Yerevan
19:15 (UTC+4)	Kalaydzhyan (yellow card) 33'; Davidyan (yellow card) 42' (yellow-red card) 74'; João Victor (yellow card) 44'; Spychka (yellow card) 50'; Ryzhov 84'	Report	Thiago Galvão 45' (pen.); Ishkhanyan (yellow card) 86'	Stadium: Yerevan Football Academy Stadium; Attendance: 200; Referee: Gevorg Eghoyan

31 August 2019 5	Alashkert	1 – 2	Shirak	Yerevan
17:00 (UTC+4)	M.Manasyan 36'; V.Pogosyan (yellow card) 66'; Baranov (yellow card) 82'	Report	Prljević (yellow card) 42'; M.Bakayoko 50' (pen.); M.Kone (yellow card) 86' (goal) 90+1'	Stadium: Alashkert Stadium; Attendance: 250; Referee: Suren Baliyan

13 September 2019 6	Pyunik	0 – 3	Alashkert	Yerevan
19:15 (UTC+4)	Simonyan (yellow card) 40'; Grigoryan (yellow card) 41'; Zhestokov (yellow card) 45+1'; Marku (yellow card) 64'; A.Manucharyan (yellow card) 71'; U.Iwu (yellow card) 79'	Report	Marmentini 27', 57'; Cametá (yellow card) 52'; Voskanyan (yellow card) 59'; Galvão 85'; Daghbashyan (yellow card) 90'	Stadium: Vazgen Sargsyan Republican Stadium; Attendance: 200; Referee: Gevorg Eghoyan

17 September 2019 7	Alashkert	5 – 1	Yerevan	Yerevan
16:15 (UTC+4)	Marmentini 10' (pen.); Glišić 14', 47'; M.Manasyan 51'; S.Shahinyan 90'	Report	Isayev 58'; Demidchik (yellow card) 71'; Lynko (yellow card) 75'	Stadium: Alashkert Stadium; Attendance: 500; Referee: Ashot Ghaltakchyan

21 September 2019 8	Alashkert	2 – 0	Gandzasar Kapan	Yerevan
16:00 (UTC+4)	Marmentini 39'; Miljković (yellow card) 51'; V.Hayrapetyan (yellow card) 77'; Čančarević (yellow card) 90+2'; M.Manasyan 90+5'	Report	A.Kocharyan (yellow card) 18'; E.Yeghiazaryan (yellow card) 40'; A.Mensah (yellow card) 74'; A.Adamyan (yellow card) 78'; Pogosyan (yellow card) 86' (yellow-red card) 89'	Stadium: Alashkert Stadium; Attendance: 300; Referee: Artur Simonyan

29 September 2019 9	Noah	1 – 2	Alashkert	Yerevan
16:00 (UTC+4)	Zaprudskikh (yellow card) 26'; Bor 43'; Lavrishchev (yellow card) 44'; Deobald (yellow card) 58'; S.Dmitriev (yellow card) 90'	Report	Miljković (yellow card) 53'; Grigoryan (yellow card) 64'; V.Hayrapetyan 68'; Voskanyan (yellow card) 90'; Kadymyan 90+1'; Thiago Galvão (yellow card) 90+3'	Stadium: Alashkert Stadium; Attendance: 300; Referee: Zaven Hovhannisyan
Note: Match played at the Alashkert Stadium in Yerevan, instead of Noah's regular Mika Stadium in Yerevan.

5 October 2019 10	Ararat-Armenia	2 – 0	Alashkert	Yerevan
15:00 (UTC+4)	Avetisyan 32'; Pashov (yellow card) 45+3'; Achenteh (yellow card) 78'; Kódjo (yellow card) 85'; Mailson 88'	Report	Voskanyan (yellow card) 77'; Marmentini (yellow card) 85'	Stadium: Yerevan Football Academy Stadium; Attendance: 400; Referee: Suren Baliyan

20 October 2019 11	Alashkert	0 – 1	Lori	Yerevan
15:00 (UTC+4)	Avahimyan (yellow card) 25'; Baranov (yellow card) 53'; Čančarević (yellow card) 60'; V.Hayrapetyan (yellow card) 88'	Report	J.Ufuoma (yellow card) 16'; E.Darko (yellow card) 19'; Désiré 55' (pen.); L.Macharashvili (yellow card) 58'; Auzmendi (yellow card) 70'	Stadium: Alashkert Stadium; Attendance: 300; Referee: Edgar Sahakyan

25 October 2019 12	Urartu	2 – 4	Alashkert	Yerevan
19:00 (UTC+4)	Budnik 15'; N.Petrosyan (yellow card) 30'; J.Azocar 50'	Report	Glišić 43', 54' (yellow card) 61'; Tankov 47'; E.Avagyan 84'; Avagyan (yellow card) 90+3'	Stadium: Urartu Stadium; Attendance: 300; Referee: Zaven Hovhannisyan

29 October 2019 1	Alashkert	2 – 1	Ararat-Armenia	Yerevan
15:00 (UTC+4)	Glišić (yellow card) 7' (goal) 89'; Tankov 37'; Voskanyan (yellow card) 47'; Daghbashyan (yellow card) 80'	Report	Sanogo 29'; Malakyan (yellow card) 34'; Danielyan (yellow card) 68'; Kódjo (yellow card) 72'	Stadium: Alashkert Stadium; Attendance: 400; Referee: Artur Safaryan
Note: Match originally scheduled for 4 August 2019.

9 November 2019 13	Alashkert	1 – 1	Ararat Yerevan	Yerevan
14:00 (UTC+4)	Thiago Galvão 45+1' (pen.); V.Hayrapetyan (yellow card) 52'; Grigoryan (yellow card) 69'; Daghbashyan (yellow card) 89'; Baranov (yellow card) 90+1'	Report	Aleksanyan 4' (pen.) (yellow card) 16'; Dedechko (yellow card) 26'; Logua (yellow card) 28'; Balyaikin (yellow card) 45'	Stadium: Alashkert Stadium; Attendance: 150; Referee: Suren Baliyan

23 November 2019 14	Shirak	1 – 3	Alashkert	Gyumri
14:00 (UTC+4)	M.Kone 82'	Report	Marmentini 13', 36' (pen.); Thiago Galvão 85'	Stadium: Gyumri City Stadium; Attendance: 500; Referee: Ashot Ghaltakchyan

1 December 2019 15	Alashkert	1 – 1	Pyunik	Yerevan
14:00 (UTC+4)	Thiago Galvão 34' (pen.); Baranov (yellow card) 40' (yellow-red card) 70'; Miljković (yellow card) 60'	Report	Yedigaryan 23' (yellow card) 27'; Dragojević (yellow card) 33'	Stadium: Alashkert Stadium; Attendance: 300; Referee: Zaven Hovhannisyan

28 February 2020 16	Yerevan	0 – 3	Alashkert	Vanadzor
14:00 (UTC+4)		Report		Stadium: Vanadzor City Stadium
Note: Match awarded as a 3-0 to Alashkert after Yerevan withdrew from the league. Match was due to be played at the Vanadzor City Stadium in Vanadzor, instead of Yerevan's regular Vazgen Sargsyan Republican Stadium in Yerevan.

6 March 2020 17	Gandzasar Kapan	2 – 2	Alashkert	Yerevan
15:15 (UTC+4)	V.Minasyan 13'; H.Asoyan (yellow card) 18'; D.Terteryan (yellow card) 20'; An.Kocharyan (yellow card) 39'; Grigoryan 72'	Report	Marmentini 10'; Glišić (yellow card) 20'; Voskanyan (yellow card) 29'; Gatikoyev 37'; Cametá (yellow card) 87'	Stadium: Yerevan Football Academy; Attendance: 100; Referee: Vardan Manukyan
Note: Match played at the Yerevan Football Academy in Yerevan, instead of Gandzasar Kapan regular Gandzasar Stadium in Kapan.

24 May 2020 18	Alashkert	0 – 1	Noah	Yerevan
17:15 (UTC+4)	Ishkhanyan (yellow card) 45'; Gome (yellow card) 85'	Report	H.Manga (yellow card) 25'; A.Tatayev (yellow card) 71'; Mayrovich 74'	Stadium: Alashkert Stadium; Attendance: 0 Referee: Henrik Nalbandyan
Note: Match played behind closed doors. Match was originally scheduled for 16 March, but postponed on 13 March due to the COVID-19 pandemic.

===== Table =====
Pos	Team	Pld	W	D	L	GF	GA	GD	Pts	Qualification
1	Ararat-Armenia	18	11	3	4	33	15	+18	36	Qualification for the Championship round
2	Lori	18	9	5	4	27	19	+8	32	Qualification for the Championship round
3	Alashkert	18	9	4	5	33	20	+13	31	Qualification for the Championship round
4	Ararat	18	9	4	5	25	18	+7	31	Qualification for the Championship round
5	Noah	18	9	3	6	25	19	+6	30	Qualification for the Championship round
6	Shirak	18	8	4	6	25	18	+7	28	Qualification for the Championship round
7	Pyunik	18	7	2	9	35	36	−1	23	Qualification for the Relegation round
8	Urartu	18	6	5	7	22	24	−2	23	Qualification for the Relegation round
9	Gandzasar	18	4	6	8	20	25	−5	18	Qualification for the Relegation round
10	Yerevan (R, D)	18	0	0	18	11	62	−51	0	Withdrawn

Source: Soccerway
Rules for classification: 1) Points; 2) Play-off (only if deciding champion); 3) Matches won; 4) Head-to-head points; 5) Head-to-head matches won; 6) Head-to-head goal difference; 7) Head-to-head goals scored; 8) Head-to-head away goals scored; 9) Goal difference; 10) Goals scored.
(D) Disqualified; (R) Relegated

==== Championship round ====
===== Results summary =====
Overall								Home						Away					
Pld	W	D	L	GF	GA	GD	Pts	W	D	L	GF	GA	GD	W	D	L	GF	GA	GD
10	5	1	4	18	11	+7	16	2	0	3	9	7	+2	3	1	1	9	4	+5

Last updated: 14 July 2020.
Source: See Results

===== Results =====
31 May 2020 19	Alashkert	2 – 1	Ararat Yerevan	Yerevan
16:45 (UTC+4)	Glišić 19'; Mitrevski 42'; N.Tankov (yellow card) 45'; V.Hayrapetyan (red card) 54'; Daghbashyan (yellow card) 68'; Gome (yellow card) 71'	Report	James (yellow card) 28'; Dedechko 56' (pen.)	Stadium: Alashkert Stadium; Attendance: 0 Referee: Shahen Aghayan
Note: Match played behind closed doors due to the COVID-19 pandemic.

4 June 2020 20	Noah	1 – 0	Alashkert	Yerevan
17:30 (UTC+4)	Deobald (yellow card) 58'; Kovalenko (yellow card) 62'; H.Manga (yellow card) 70'; K.Bor (yellow card) 72'; Emsis (yellow card) 74'; Kagermazov (yellow card) 76'; Azarov 89'	Report	Voskanyan (yellow card)	Stadium: Alashkert Stadium; Attendance: 0 Referee: Shahen Aghayan
Note: Match played behind closed doors due to the COVID-19 pandemic.

8 June 2020 21	Alashkert	1 – 2	Ararat-Armenia	Yerevan
17:30 (UTC+4)	Miljković (yellow card) 57'; Glišić 59'	Report	Otubanjo 11'; Antonov (yellow card) 56'; Mailson 66' (pen.) (yellow card) 79'; Abakumov (yellow card) 90+3'	Stadium: Alashkert Stadium; Attendance: 0 Referee: Zaven Hovhannisyan
Note: Match played behind closed doors due to the COVID-19 pandemic.

12 June 2020 22	Lori	0 – 2	Alashkert	Vanadzor
17:00 (UTC+4)	U.Iwu (yellow card) 23'; J.Ufuoma (yellow card) 70'	Report	Bryan (yellow card) 18'; Marmentini 44' (pen.); Thiago Galvão 57'; Grigoryan (yellow card) 73'	Stadium: Vanadzor Football Academy; Attendance: 0 Referee: Zaven Hovhannisyan
Note: Match played behind closed doors due to the COVID-19 pandemic.

16 June 2020 23	Alashkert	1 – 2	Shirak	Yerevan
17:30 (UTC+4)	Gome (yellow card) 27'; Baranov (yellow card) 54'; Marmentini 88'	Report	M.Kone 76'; Nenadović 90+3'; V.Arzoyan (yellow card) 90+3'	Stadium: Alashkert Stadium; Attendance: 0 Referee: Henrik Nalbandyan
Note: Match played behind closed doors due to the COVID-19 pandemic.

21 June 2020 24	Ararat Yerevan	1 – 3	Alashkert	Yerevan
19:30 (UTC+4)	Vitinho (yellow card) 21'; Spychka 35'; R.Hakobyan (yellow card) 70'	Report	Tiago Cametá (red card) 16'; Glišić (yellow card) 20' (goal) 43', 68'; Mitrevski 45'; Grigoryan (yellow card) 82'	Stadium: Yerevan Football Academy Stadium; Attendance: 0 Referee: Ashot Ghaltakchyan
Note: Match played behind closed doors due to the COVID-19 pandemic.

28 June 2020 25	Alashkert	0 – 1	Noah	Yerevan
17:30 (UTC+4)	Miljković (yellow card) 37'; Thiago Galvão (yellow card) 88'	Report	Kryuchkov (yellow card) 77'; K.Bor 87'; Lavrishchev (yellow card) 90+3'	Stadium: Alashkert Stadium; Attendance: 0 Referee: Shahen Aghayan
Note: Match played behind closed doors due to the COVID-19 pandemic.

2 July 2020 26	Ararat-Armenia	0 – 0	Alashkert	Yerevan
20:00 (UTC+4)	Kódjo (yellow card) 4' (yellow-red card) 77'; A.Khachumyan (yellow card) 80'; Malakyan (yellow card) 82'; Gouffran (yellow card) 90'	Report	Baranov (yellow card) 16' (yellow-red card) 90+2'; Gome (yellow card) 28'; Marmentini (yellow card) 67'; V.Hayrapetyan (yellow card) 84'	Stadium: Yerevan Football Academy Stadium; Attendance: 0 Referee: Henrik Nalbandyan
Note: Match played behind closed doors due to the COVID-19 pandemic.

7 July 2020 27	Alashkert	5 – 1	Lori	Yerevan
18:00 (UTC+4)	Thiago Galvão 10'; Camara 48'; Glišić 49', 69'; Tiago Cametá (yellow card) 56'; Voskanyan (yellow card) 63'; E.Avagyan 90+2'	Report	U.Iwu 4'; Alexis (yellow card) 41'; Désiré (yellow card) 63'; J.Bravo (yellow card) 90+2'	Stadium: Alashkert Stadium; Attendance: 0 Referee: Shahen Aghayan
Note: Match played behind closed doors due to the COVID-19 pandemic.

14 July 2020 28	Shirak	2 – 4	Alashkert	Gyumri
17:30 (UTC+4)	M.Kone 35' (pen.), 87'; Miličić (yellow card) 53' R.Mkrtchyan (yellow card) 68'	Report	Marmentini 20'; Tiago Cametá (yellow card) 34'; Voskanyan (yellow card) 39'; Bryan 51'; Gome (yellow card) 58'; Thiago Galvão 62'; N.Tankov 72'	Stadium: Gyumri City Stadium; Attendance: 0 Referee: Shahen Aghayan
Note: Match played behind closed doors due to the COVID-19 pandemic.

===== Table =====
Pos	Team	Pld	W	D	L	GF	GA	GD	Pts	Qualification
1	Ararat-Armenia (C)	28	15	7	6	45	23	+22	52	Qualification for the Champions League first qualifying round
2	Noah	28	14	6	8	37	27	+10	48	Qualification for the Europa League first qualifying round (Note: team qualified for the Europa League first qualifying round by winning the 2019–20 Armenian Cup.)
3	Alashkert	28	14	5	9	51	31	+20	47	Qualification for the Europa League first qualifying round
4	Shirak	28	13	7	8	40	30	+10	46	Qualification for the Europa League first qualifying round
5	Lori	27	10	10	7	35	33	+2	40	(Note: Match between Lori and Ararat Yerevan was cancelled on 10 July, with no points being awarded.)
6	Ararat	27	9	6	12	31	36	−5	33	(Note: Match between Lori and Ararat Yerevan was cancelled on 10 July, with no points being awarded.)

Source: Soccerway
Rules for classification: 1) Points; 2) Play-off (only if deciding champion); 3) Matches won; 4) Head-to-head points; 5) Head-to-head matches won; 6) Head-to-head goal difference; 7) Head-to-head goals scored; 8) Head-to-head away goals scored; 9) Goal difference; 10) Goals scored.
(C) Champions

=== Armenian Cup ===
3 November 2019 Second Round	Torpedo Yerevan	1 – 3	Alashkert	Abovyan
15:00 (UTC+4)	Sukhodub (yellow card) 37'; M.Deda 49'; K.Veranyan (yellow card) 62'	Report	D.Ghandilyan 22'; Avahimyan 66'; S.Shahinyan (yellow card) 67'; Thiago Galvão 75'; Tankov (yellow card) 85'; Aloyan (yellow card) 90+4'	Stadium: Abovyan City Stadium; Attendance: 150; Referee: Artush Kerobyan

27 November 2019 Quarterfinal	Gandzasar Kapan	3 – 1	Alashkert	Yerevan
14:30 (UTC+4)	Aslanyan 8', 23' (yellow card) 89'; H.Asoyan (red card) 64'; G.Nranyan (yellow card) 65'; G.Harutyunyan 89'; V.Arzoyan (yellow card) 89'; G.Ohanyan (yellow card) 90+1'	Report	Thiago Galvão 38' (yellow card) 90+3'; Glišić (yellow card) 43'; Marmentini (yellow card) 65'; Grigoryan (yellow card) 71'	Stadium: Yerevan Football Academy Stadium; Attendance: 50; Referee: Henrik Nalbandyan

=== UEFA Europa League ===
==== Qualifying rounds ====
11 July 2019 First qualifying round 1st leg	Alashkert (Armenia)	3 – 1	(North Macedonia) Makedonija GP	Yerevan, Armenia
19:00 (UTC+4)	Tankov 16'; Ishkhanyan (yellow card) 31'; Sekulić 67' (yellow card) 73'; Bianor 82' (o.g.)	Report	Jasharoski 52'; E.Lichina (yellow card) 70'; K.Filipovski (yellow card) 80'	Stadium: Yerevan Football Academy Stadium; Attendance: 1,285; Referee: Nathan Verboomen (Belgium)
Note: Alashkert played their home games at the Yerevan Football Academy Stadium, Yerevan, instead of their regular stadium Alashkert Stadium, Yerevan.

18 July 2019 First qualifying round 2nd leg	Makedonija GP (North Macedonia)	0 – 3 (1 – 6 agg.)	(Armenia) Alashkert	Skopje, North Macedonia
18:30 (UTC+4)	B.Demir (yellow card) 75'	Report	Nenadović 21'; Tiago Galvão 68'; Voskanyan 74'	Stadium: Petar Miloševski Training Centre; Attendance: 656; Referee: Christophe Pires (Luxembourg)
Note: Makedonija GP played their home games at the Petar Miloševski Training Centre, Skopje, instead of their regular stadium Gjorče Petrov Stadium, Skopje which does not meet UEFA requirements.

25 July 2019 Second qualifying round 1st leg	Alashkert (Armenia)	0 – 3	(Romania) FCSB	Yerevan, Armenia
21:00 (UTC+4)	Grigoryan (yellow card) 76'; Voskanyan (yellow card) 88'	Report	Cristea (yellow card) 16' (goal) 68'; Tănase 60'; Coman 82'	Stadium: Yerevan Football Academy Stadium; Attendance: 1,420; Referee: Robert Harvey (Ireland)
Note: Alashkert played their home games at the Yerevan Football Academy Stadium, Yerevan, instead of their regular stadium Alashkert Stadium, Yerevan.

1 August 2019 Second qualifying round 2nd leg	FCSB (Romania)	2 – 3 (5 – 3 agg.)	(Armenia) Alashkert	Giurgiu, Romania
22:30 (UTC+4)	Tănase 10' (pen.); Bălașa (red card) 27'; Oaidă (yellow card) 57'; Coman 59'; Cristea (yellow card) 68'	Report	Marmentini 24', 28' (pen.) (red card) 63'; Ishkhanyan (yellow card) 31'; Thiago Galvão 45'; V.Hayrapetyan (yellow card) 45+2'	Stadium: Marin Anastasovici; Attendance: 1,828; Referee: Peter Kralovič (Slovakia)
Note: FCSB played their home match at Marin Anastasovici, instead of their regular stadium Arena Națională, Bucharest.

== Statistics ==
As of match played 14 July 2020

=== Appearances and goals ===
No.	Pos	Nat	Player	Total		Premier League		Armenian Cup		Armenian Supercup		Europa League	
No.	Pos	Nat	Player	Apps	Goals	Apps	Goals	Apps	Goals	Apps	Goals	Apps	Goals
1	GK	(Armenia) ARM	Henri Avagyan	3	0	1	0	1	0	1	0	0	0
2	DF	(Serbia) SRB	Aleksandar Miljković	14	0	13	0	1	0	0	0	0	0
3	DF	(Armenia) ARM	Taron Voskanyan	31	1	24+1	0	1	0	1	0	4	1
4	MF	(Armenia) ARM	Arman Sargsyan	1	0	0+1	0	0	0	0	0	0	0
5	DF	(Estonia) EST	Nikita Baranov	23	0	21	0	1	0	0+1	0	0	0
6	MF	(Senegal) SEN	Pape Abdou Camara	10	1	4+6	1	0	0	0	0	0	0
7	MF	(Namibia) NAM	Wangu Gome	11	0	10+1	0	0	0	0	0	0	0
8	DF	(Armenia) ARM	Gagik Daghbashyan	30	0	20+3	0	2	0	1	0	4	0
9	FW	(Brazil) BRA	Thiago Galvão	33	12	26+1	8	1+1	2	0+1	0	1+2	2
10	MF	(Brazil) BRA	Gustavo Marmentini	29	14	22+2	11	1	0	1	1	2+1	2
11	MF	(Armenia) ARM	Vahagn Hayrapetyan	27	1	11+11	1	0	0	1	0	4	0
12	MF	(Armenia) ARM	Hayk Galstyan	1	0	0+1	0	0	0	0	0	0	0
14	DF	(North Macedonia) MKD	Risto Mitrevski	12	2	12	2	0	0	0	0	0	0
15	FW	(Bosnia and Herzegovina) BIH	Aleksandar Glišić	25	11	20+2	11	1+1	0	1	0	0	0
17	FW	(Nigeria) NGR	Sunday Ingbede	2	0	1+1	0	0	0	0	0	0	0
18	DF	(Brazil) BRA	Tiago Cametá	31	0	25	0	0+1	0	1	0	3+1	0
19	FW	(Russia) RUS	Nikita Tankov	27	5	9+12	4	0+2	0	0	0	3+1	1
20	DF	(Brazil) BRA	Bryan	10	1	8+2	1	0	0	0	0	0	0
21	MF	(Armenia) ARM	Artak Grigoryan	28	0	20+2	0	1	0	0+1	0	4	0
22	DF	(Armenia) ARM	Hayk Ishkhanyan	19	0	10+3	0	1	0	1	0	4	0
23	FW	(Russia) RUS	David Gatikoyev	7	1	0+7	1	0	0	0	0	0	0
24	MF	(Armenia) ARM	Eduard Avagyan	4	3	0+3	2	1	1	0	0	0	0
25	DF	(Armenia) ARM	Gor Poghosyan	2	0	0+1	0	1	0	0	0	0	0
55	GK	(Serbia) SRB	Ognjen Čančarević	30	0	25	0	1	0	0	0	4	0
77	FW	(Armenia) ARM	Edgar Manucharyan	5	0	0+5	0	0	0	0	0	0	0
Players away on loan:
Players who left Alashkert during the season:
4	DF	(Serbia) SRB	Mladen Zeljković	1	0	0	0	1	0	0	0	0	0
6	MF	(Armenia) ARM	Artur Yedigaryan	4	0	0+2	0	1	0	1	0	0	0
7	FW	(Armenia) ARM	Mihran Manasyan	15	4	5+7	3	1	0	1	1	0+1	0
12	FW	(Armenia) ARM	David Ghandilyan	3	1	0+1	0	1	1	0+1	0	0	0
13	MF	(Ukraine) UKR	Artur Avahimyan	3	0	1	0	1	0	0	0	0+1	0
13	DF	(Moldova) MDA	Victor Mudrac	1	0	0+1	0	0	0	0	0	0	0
14	MF	(Armenia) ARM	Sargis Shahinyan	17	2	6+6	2	1+1	0	1	0	0+2	0
15	FW	(Serbia) SRB	Uroš Nenadović	4	1	0	0	0	0	0	0	4	1
17	MF	(Serbia) SRB	Danilo Sekulić	3	1	0	0	0	0	0	0	3	1
17	MF	(Armenia) ARM	Ghukas Poghosyan	6	0	0+6	0	0	0	0	0	0	0
20	FW	(Armenia) ARM	Vardan Pogosyan	3	0	1+1	0	0	0	0	0	0+1	0
22	DF	(Armenia) ARM	Hrayr Mkoyan	4	0	0	0	0	0	0	0	4	0
23	DF	(Russia) RUS	Kirill Aloyan	3	0	0+2	0	1	0	0	0	0	0
77	FW	(Armenia) ARM	Gegham Kadymyan	8	1	0+5	1	1	0	0	0	0+2	0
	FW	(Armenia) ARM	Akhmed Jindoyan	1	0	1	0	0	0	0	0	0	0

=== Goal scorers ===
Place	Position	Nation	Number	Name	Premier League	Armenian Cup	Armenian Supercup	Europa League	Total
1	MF	(Brazil)	10	Gustavo Marmentini	11	0	1	2	14
2	FW	(Brazil)	9	Thiago Galvão	8	2	0	2	12
3	FW	(Bosnia and Herzegovina)	15	Aleksandar Glišić	11	0	0	0	11
4	FW	(Russia)	19	Nikita Tankov	4	0	0	1	5
5	FW	(Armenia)	7	Mihran Manasyan	3	0	1	0	4
6	MF	(Armenia)	24	Eduard Avagyan	2	1	0	0	3
7	MF	(Armenia)	14	Sargis Shahinyan	2	0	0	0	2
7	DF	(North Macedonia)	14	Risto Mitrevski	2	0	0	0	2
9	MF	(Armenia)	11	Vahagn Hayrapetyan	1	0	0	0	1
9	FW	(Armenia)	77	Gegham Kadymyan	1	0	0	0	1
9	FW	(Russia)	23	David Gatikoyev	1	0	0	0	1
9	MF	(Senegal)	6	Pape Abdou Camara	1	0	0	0	1
9	DF	(Brazil)	20	Bryan	1	0	0	0	1
9	FW	(Armenia)	12	David Ghandilyan	0	1	0	0	1
9	MF	(Serbia)	17	Danilo Sekulić	0	0	0	1	1
9	FW	(Serbia)	15	Uroš Nenadović	0	0	0	1	1
9	DF	(Armenia)	3	Taron Voskanyan	0	0	0	1	1
9				Own goal	0	0	0	1	1
				Awarded	3	0	0	0	3
				TOTALS	51	4	2	9	64

=== Clean sheets ===
Place	Position	Nation	Number	Name	Premier League	Armenian Cup	Armenian Supercup	Europa League	Total
1	GK	(Serbia)	55	Ognjen Čančarević	4	0	0	1	5
				TOTALS	4	0	0	1	5

=== Disciplinary record ===
Number	Nation	Position	Name	Premier League		Armenian Cup		Armenian Supercup		Europa League		Total	
Number	Nation	Position	Name	Yellow card	Red card	Yellow card	Red card	Yellow card	Red card	Yellow card	Red card	Yellow card	Red card
1	(Armenia)	GK	Henri Avagyan	1	0	0	0	0	0	0	0	1	0
2	(Serbia)	DF	Aleksandar Miljković	5	0	0	0	0	0	0	0	5	0
3	(Armenia)	DF	Taron Voskanyan	7	0	0	0	1	0	1	0	9	0
5	(Estonia)	DF	Nikita Baranov	8	2	0	0	0	0	0	0	8	2
7	(Namibia)	MF	Wangu Gome	5	0	0	0	0	0	0	0	5	0
8	(Armenia)	DF	Gagik Daghbashyan	4	0	0	0	1	0	0	0	5	0
9	(Brazil)	FW	Thiago Galvão	2	0	1	0	0	0	0	0	3	0
10	(Brazil)	MF	Gustavo Marmentini	2	0	1	0	1	0	0	1	4	1
11	(Armenia)	MF	Vahagn Hayrapetyan	4	1	0	0	0	0	1	0	5	1
15	(Bosnia and Herzegovina)	FW	Aleksandar Glišić	4	0	1	0	0	0	0	0	5	0
18	(Brazil)	DF	Tiago Cametá	4	1	0	0	0	0	0	0	4	1
19	(Russia)	FW	Nikita Tankov	1	0	1	0	0	0	0	0	2	0
20	(Brazil)	DF	Bryan	1	0	0	0	0	0	0	0	1	0
21	(Armenia)	MF	Artak Grigoryan	4	0	1	0	0	0	1	0	6	0
22	(Armenia)	DF	Hayk Ishkhanyan	4	0	0	0	0	0	2	0	6	0
55	(Serbia)	GK	Ognjen Čančarević	2	0	0	0	0	0	0	0	2	0
Players who left Alashkert during the season:
13	(Ukraine)	MF	Artur Avahimyan	1	0	0	0	0	0	0	0	1	0
14	(Armenia)	MF	Sargis Shahinyan	0	0	1	0	0	0	0	0	1	0
17	(Serbia)	MF	Danilo Sekulić	0	0	0	0	0	0	1	0	1	0
20	(Armenia)	FW	Vardan Pogosyan	1	0	0	0	0	0	0	0	1	0
23	(Russia)	DF	Kirill Aloyan	0	0	1	0	0	0	0	0	1	0
77	(Armenia)	FW	Gegham Kadymyan	1	0	0	0	0	0	0	0	1	0
			TOTALS	60	4	7	0	3	0	6	1	77	5
