= Kirill Aloyan =

Russian footballer

Personal information
- Full name: Kirill Olegovich Aloyan
- Date of birth: 22 January 1999 (age 27)
- Place of birth: Saint Petersburg, Russia
- Height: 1.87 m (6 ft 2 in)
- Position: Defender

Youth career
- 2016–2019: Zenit Saint Petersburg

Senior career*
Years	Team	Apps	(Gls)
2017–2019	Zenit Saint Petersburg	0	(0)
2018–2019	→ Zenit-2 Saint Petersburg	0	(0)
2019	Alashkert	2	(0)
2020	Yenisey Krasnoyarsk	0	(0)
2020	Slutsk	2	(0)
2021–2022	Rodina Moscow	7	(0)
2021–2022	→ Dynamo Bryansk (loan)	15	(1)
2022–2023	Zvijezda Gradačac	14	(0)
2023	Ryazan	15	(0)
- * Club domestic league appearances and goals as of 12 November 2023

Kirill Olegovich Aloyan (Russian: Кирилл Олегович Алоян; born 22 January 1999) is a Russian former professional footballer.
