= Daniel Carrillo =

Venezuelan footballer (born 1995)

Personal information
- Full name: Daniel José Carrillo Montilla
- Date of birth: 2 December 1995 (age 30)
- Place of birth: Barquisimeto, Venezuela
- Height: 1.75 m (5 ft 9 in)
- Position: Defender

Team information
- Current team: Universidad Central
- Number: 6

Youth career
- –2013: Deportivo Lara

Senior career*
| Years | Team | Apps | (Gls) |
| 2013–2020 | Deportivo Lara | 181 | (3) |
| 2021–2022 | KuPS | 42 | (2) |
| 2023–2024 | Alashkert | 33 | (0) |
| 2024– | Universidad Central | 65 | (2) |

International career^{‡}
| 2015 | Venezuela U-20 | 3 | (0) |
| 2021– | Venezuela | 2 | (0) |
- * Club domestic league appearances and goals as of 10 March 2026 ‡ National team caps and goals as of 20:40, 27 January 2022 (UTC)

Daniel José Carrillo Montilla (born 2 December 1995), known as Daniel Carrillo, is a Venezuelan professional footballer who plays as a defender for Universidad Central.

== Club career ==
Carrillo started playing football in his native Venezuela with Deportivo Lara, debuting with the club's first team in top-tier Venezuelan Primera División in 2013. He ultimately spent eight seasons with the club.

On 4 February 2021, Carrillo moved to Finland and signed a two-year deal with Kuopion Palloseura (KuPS). Carrillo and KuPS won two Finnish Cup titles, in 2021 and 2022.

On 18 January 2023, Carrillo signed for Armenian Premier League club Alashkert. On 10 January 2024, Alashkert announced the departure of Carrillo.

On 18 January 2024, Universidad Central announced the signing of Carrillo.

== International career ==
Carrillo made his debut for the Venezuela national team on 2 September 2021 in a World Cup qualifier against Argentina, a 3–1 home loss. He substituted Jefferson Savarino at half-time.

== Career statistics ==
=== Club ===
As of 16 May 2025

Appearances and goals by club, season and competition
| Club | Season | League | | | National cup (Note: Includes Copa Venezuela, Suomen Cup and Armenian Cup) | | Continental | | Other | | Total | |
| Club | Season | Division | Apps | Goals | Apps | Goals | Apps | Goals | Apps | Goals | Apps | Goals |
|---|---|---|---|---|---|---|---|---|---|---|---|---|
| Deportivo Lara | 2013–14 | Venezuelan Primera División | 20 | 0 | 0 | 0 | – | | – | | 20 | 0 |
| Deportivo Lara | 2014–15 | Venezuelan Primera División | 5 | 1 | 0 | 0 | – | | – | | 5 | 1 |
| Deportivo Lara | 2015 | Venezuelan Primera División | 17 | 0 | 7 | 1 | – | | – | | 24 | 1 |
| Deportivo Lara | 2016 | Venezuelan Primera División | 13 | 0 | 2 | 0 | 0 | 0 | – | | 15 | 0 |
| Deportivo Lara | 2017 | Venezuelan Primera División | 35 | 0 | 2 | 0 | – | | – | | 37 | 0 |
| Deportivo Lara | 2018 | Venezuelan Primera División | 37 | 2 | 0 | 0 | 4 (Note: Includes Copa Libertadores) | 0 | – | | 41 | 2 |
| Deportivo Lara | 2019 | Venezuelan Primera División | 35 | 0 | 2 | 0 | 3 (Note: Includes Copa Libertadores and Copa Sudamericana) | 0 | – | | 50 | 0 |
| Deportivo Lara | 2020 | Venezuelan Primera División | 19 | 0 | 0 | 0 | – | | – | | 19 | 0 |
| Deportivo Lara | Total | | 181 | 3 | 13 | 1 | 7 | 0 | – | – | 201 | 4 |
| KuPS | 2021 | Veikkausliiga | 22 | 0 | 5 | 1 | 8 (Note: Includes UEFA Europa Conference League) | 0 | – | | 35 | 1 |
| KuPS | 2022 | Veikkausliiga | 20 | 2 | 3 | 0 | 6 | 1 | 4 (Note: Includes Finnish League Cup) | 0 | 33 | 3 |
| KuPS | Total | | 42 | 2 | 8 | 1 | 14 | 1 | 4 | 0 | 68 | 4 |
| KuPS II | 2022 | Kakkonen | 1 | 0 | – | | – | | – | | 1 | 0 |
| Alashkert | 2022–23 | Armenian Premier League | 15 | 0 | – | | – | | – | | 15 | 0 |
| Alashkert | 2023–24 | Armenian Premier League | 18 | 0 | 1 | 0 | 4 | 0 | – | | 23 | 0 |
| Alashkert | Total | | 33 | 0 | 1 | 0 | 4 | 0 | – | – | 38 | 0 |
| Universidad Central | 2024 | Venezuelan Primera División | 30 | 2 | 1 | 0 | – | | – | | 31 | 2 |
| Universidad Central | 2025 | Venezuelan Primera División | 14 | 0 | 0 | 0 | 2 | 0 | – | | 16 | 0 |
| Universidad Central | Total | | 44 | 2 | 1 | 0 | 2 | 0 | 0 | 0 | 47 | 2 |
| Career total | | | 291 | 7 | 23 | 2 | 27 | 1 | 4 | 0 | 355 | 10 |

=== International ===
As of match played 11 November 2021

Venezuela
| Year | Apps | Goals |
|---|---|---|
| 2021 | 2 | 0 |
| Total | 2 | 0 |

== Honours ==
KuPS

- Veikkausliiga runner-up: 2021, 2022
- Finnish Cup: 2021, 2022
