= Tiago Cametá =

Brazilian footballer

Personal information
- Full name: Tiago Coelho Andrade
- Date of birth: 5 May 1992 (age 34)
- Place of birth: Cametá, Brazil
- Position: Right back

Team information
- Current team: Alashkert
- Number: 55

Senior career*
Years	Team	Apps	(Gls)
2012	Remo	4	(0)
2013	Ponte Preta	1	(0)
2013	→ Vila Nova (loan)	11	(0)
2013–2014	Fortaleza	20	(1)
2014–2018	Ceará	71	(1)
2018	→ Avaí (loan)	0	(0)
2018	Brasil de Pelotas	15	(0)
2019	Vila Nova	0	(0)
2019–2022	Alashkert	84	(0)
2023–	Alashkert	6	(0)
- * Club domestic league appearances and goals as of 1 June 2024

Tiago Coelho Andrade (born 5 May 1992), commonly known as Tiago Cametá is a Brazilian footballer who plays as a right back for Alashkert.

== Club career ==
Born in Cametá, Cametá started his career with Remo in the Brazilian fourth tier in 2012. In January 2013, he moved to Série A club Ponte Preta. On 13 July, he made his debut in a 0–0 draw against Bahia.

In order to gain more first team appearances, Cametá joined Série C (third tier) club Vila Nova on 27 August 2013, after agreeing to a season long loan deal. After appearing 11 times for the club in the campaign, he moved to Fortaleza of the same tier on 21 December 2013. On 5 May 2014, he scored his first and only league goal in a 2–1 home victory against Cuiabá.

Cametá moved to Ceará on 15 December 2014 for the 2015 season. On 28 October 2017, the club announced that he was suspended from the squad for the rest of the season due to disciplinary reasons.

On 8 January 2018, Cametá joined Avaí Futebol Clube on a one-year loan deal. However, he cut short his loan deal and instead joined Brasil de Pelotas on loan on 24 April.

On 24 December 2022, Cametá was released by Alashkert. On 23 June 2023, Alashkert announced the return of Cametá.

== Career statistics ==
As of match played 19 August 2023

Appearances and goals by club, season and competition
Club	Season	League			State League		National Cup		Continental		Other		Total	
Club	Season	Division	Apps	Goals	Apps	Goals	Apps	Goals	Apps	Goals	Apps	Goals	Apps	Goals
Remo	2012	Série D	4	0	0	0	4	0	—		—		8	0
Ponte Preta	2013	Série A	1	0	1 (Note: Appearances in Campeonato Paulista)	0	2	0	—		—		4	0
Vila Nova (loan)	2013	Série C	11	0	0	0	0	0	—		—		11	0
Fortaleza	2014	Série C	20	1	23 (Note: Appearances in Campeonato Cearense)	1	0	0	—		—		43	2
Ceará	2015	Série B	17	0	15	0	3	0	—		8 (Note: Appearances in Liga do Nordeste)	0	43	0
Ceará	2016	Série B	27	1	11	1	4	0	—		8	1	50	3
Ceará	2017	Série B	27	0	13	1	1	0	—		3 (Note: Appearances in Primeira Liga)	0	44	1
Ceará	Total		71	1	39	2	8	0	—		19	1	137	4
Avaí (loan)	2018	Série B	0	0	8 (Note: Appearances in Campeonato Catarinense)	0	0	0	—		—		8	0
Brasil de Pelotas	2018	Série B	15	0	0	0	0	0	—		—		15	0
Vila Nova	2019	Série B	0	0	11	0	0	0	—		—		11	0
Alashkert	2019–20	Armenian Premier League	25	0	—		1	0	4 (Note: Appearances in the UEFA Europa League)	0	1 (Note: Appearances in the Armenian Supercup)	0	31	0
Alashkert	2020–21	Armenian Premier League	21	0	—		6	0	1	0	—		28	0
Alashkert	2021–22	Armenian Premier League	26	0	—		1	0	14 (Note: Four appearances in the UEFA Champions League, four appearances in the UEFA Europa League, six appearances in the UEFA Europa Conference League)	0	1	0	42	0
Alashkert	2022–23	Armenian Premier League	12	0	—		0	0	2 (Note: Appearances in the UEFA Europa Conference League)	0	—		14	0
Alashkert	2023–24	Armenian Premier League	1	0	—		0	0	0	0	—		1	0
Alashkert	Total		85	0	—		8	0	21	0	2	0	116	0
Career total			206	2	82	3	22	0	21	0	21	1	352	6
