= Wbeymar Angulo =

Colombian-Armenian footballer (born 1992)

Personal information
- Full name: Wbeymar Angulo Mosquera
- Date of birth: 6 March 1992 (age 34)
- Place of birth: Quibdó, Colombia
- Height: 1.81 m (5 ft 11 in)
- Position: Defensive midfielder

Team information
- Current team: Persis Solo
- Number: 6

Senior career*
Years	Team	Apps	(Gls)
2008	Patriotas	1	(0)
2009–2010	Bogotá	5	(0)
2011	Atlético Huila	1	(0)
2012	Alianza Petrolera	4	(0)
2014–2015	Murciélagos	10	(2)
2015–2020	Gandzasar Kapan	130	(8)
2020–2024	Ararat-Armenia	44	(1)
2023–2024	→ Alashkert (loan)	40	(1)
2024–2026	Malut United	64	(0)
2026–	Persis Solo	2	(0)

International career
2020–2022	Armenia	10	(2)
- * Club domestic league appearances and goals as of 20 September 2026

Wbeymar Angulo Mosquera (Armenian: Վբեյմար Անգուլո Մոսկերա; born 6 March 1992) is a professional footballer who plays as a defensive midfielder for Indonesian club Persis Solo. Born in Colombia, he plays for the Armenia national team.

== Club career ==
Wbeymar began his career in Colombia Patriotas, Bogotá, Atlético Huila and Alianza Petrolera. In January 2014, Wbeymar signed with Murciélagos in the Liga Premier de Ascenso. On 31 July 2015, Wbeymar was presented as a new signing for Gandzasar Kapan in the Armenian Premier League.

On 7 December 2020, Ararat-Armenia announced the signing of Wbeymar on a free transfer from Gandzasar Kapan after they withdrew from the Armenian Premier League.

On 16 January 2023, Wbeymar joined Alashkert on loan for the remainder of the season alongside teammate Agdon.

On 10 June 2024, Malut United management has officially recruited Wbeymar. Malut United and Wbeymar agreed to work together for the next season.

== International career ==
On 27 August 2020, Wbeymar was called up to the Armenia national team for his debut time, for their games against North Macedonia and Estonia on 5 and 8 September 2020 in the 2020–21 UEFA Nations League.

Wbeymar made his international debut for the Armenia on 5 September 2020 in a 2020–21 UEFA Nations League match against North Macedonia.

== Career statistics ==
=== Club ===
As of match played 20 September 2026

Appearances and goals by club, season and competition
Club	Season	League			National cup		Continental		Other		Total	
Club	Season	Division	Apps	Goals	Apps	Goals	Apps	Goals	Apps	Goals	Apps	Goals
Gandzasar Kapan	2015–16	Armenian Premier League	21	1	4	0	–		–		25	1
Gandzasar Kapan	2016–17	Armenian Premier League	29	0	2	0	–		–		31	0
Gandzasar Kapan	2017–18	Armenian Premier League	26	2	4	0	2 (Note: Appearances in the UEFA Europa League)	0	–		32	2
Gandzasar Kapan	2018–19	Armenian Premier League	28	1	2	0	2	0	1 (Note: Appearances in the Armenian Supercup)	0	33	1
Gandzasar Kapan	2019–20	Armenian Premier League	18	1	3	0	–		–		21	1
Gandzasar Kapan	2020–21	Armenian Premier League	8	3	1	0	–		–		9	3
Gandzasar Kapan	Total		130	8	16	0	4	0	1	0	151	8
Ararat-Armenia	2020–21	Armenian Premier League	11	1	3	0	0 (Note: Zero appearances in the UEFA Champions League & Zero appearances in the UEFA Europa League)	0	0	0	14	1
Ararat-Armenia	2021–22	Armenian Premier League	27	0	2	0	–		–		29	0
Ararat-Armenia	2022–23	Armenian Premier League	6	0	2	0	1 (Note: Appearances in the UEFA Europa Conference League)	0	–		9	0
Ararat-Armenia	Total		44	1	7	0	1	0	0	0	52	1
Alashkert (loan)	2022–23	Armenian Premier League	11	0	0	0	0	0	–		11	0
Alashkert	2023–24	Armenian Premier League	29	1	0	0	0	0	–		29	1
Malut United	2024–25	Liga 1	33	0	0	0	0	0	–		33	0
Malut United	2025–26	Super League	31	0	0	0	0	0	–		31	0
Persis Solo	2026–27	Championship	2	0	0	0	0	0	–		2	0
Career total			280	10	23	0	5	0	1	0	309	10

=== International ===
As of match played 14 June 2022

Appearances and goals by national team and year
National team	Year	Apps	Goals
Armenia
Armenia	2020	5	1
Armenia	2021	3	1
Armenia	2022	2	0
Total		10	2

As of goal scored on 1 June 2021
Scores and results list Armenia's goal tally first, score column indicates score after each Armenia goal.

List of international goals scored by Wbeymar
No.	Date	Venue	Opponent	Score	Result	Competition
1	8 September 2020	Republican Stadium, Yerevan, Armenia	Estonia	2–0	2–0	2020–21 UEFA Nations League C
2	1 June 2021	Stadion Radnik, Velika Gorica, Croatia	Croatia	1–1	1–1	Friendly
