= David Gatikoyev =

Russian footballer

Personal information
- Full name: David Levovich Gatikoyev
- Date of birth: 14 September 1993 (age 33)
- Place of birth: Moscow, Russia
- Height: 1.80 m (5 ft 11 in)
- Position: Forward

Youth career
- 2011–2014: Alania Vladikavkaz

Senior career*
Years	Team	Apps	(Gls)
2011–2014	Alania-d Vladikavkaz	84	(9)
2014–2015	Alania Vladikavkaz	29	(6)
2015–2016	SKA-Energiya Khabarovsk	22	(3)
2016–2017	Spartak Vladikavkaz	25	(8)
2017	Zenit Penza	13	(2)
2018	Minsk	10	(1)
2018–2019	Spartak Vladikavkaz	31	(11)
2020	Alashkert	7	(1)
- * Club domestic league appearances and goals

David Levovich Gatikoyev (Russian: Давид Левович Гатикоев; born 14 September 1993) is a Russian former football forward.

== Club career ==
Gatikoyev made his debut in the Russian Second Division for FC Alania-d Vladikavkaz on 26 April 2011 in a game against FC Mashuk-KMV Pyatigorsk and scored a goal on his debut.

Gatikoyev made his Russian Football National League debut for FC SKA-Energiya Khabarovsk on 11 July 2015 in a game against FC Luch-Energiya Vladivostok.

On 6 February 2020, Gatikoyev signed for Armenian Premier League club Alashkert.
