= Mimito Biai =

Bissau-Guinean footballer

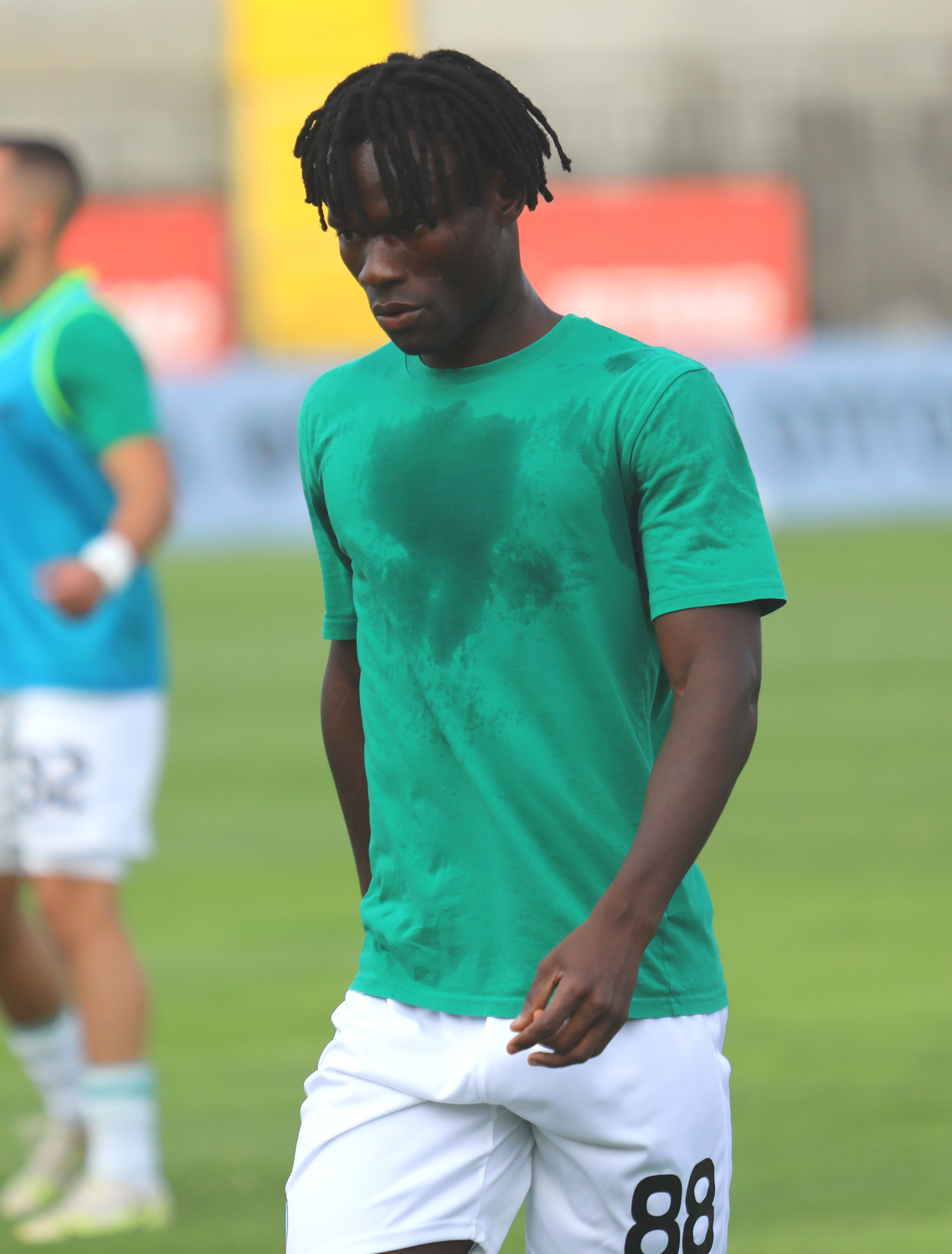

Personal information
- Full name: Atair Mimito Rocha Biai
- Date of birth: 12 December 1997 (age 28)
- Place of birth: Bissau, Guinea-Bissau
- Height: 1.73 m (5 ft 8 in)
- Position: Midfielder

Team information
- Current team: Fafe
- Number: 8

Youth career
- 2013–2014: Benfica
- 2014–2016: Vitória Guimarães

Senior career*
| Years | Team | Apps | (Gls) |
| 2016–2020 | Vitória Guimarães B | 52 | (3) |
| 2019–2020 | → Panetolikos (loan) | 18 | (0) |
| 2020–2022 | Académica | 47 | (0) |
| 2022 | Cherno More | 16 | (0) |
| 2023 | Argeș Pitești | 11 | (0) |
| 2023–2024 | Alashkert | 35 | (2) |
| 2024–2025 | Emirates | 0 | (0) |
| 2025 | Pyunik | 4 | (0) |
| 2025–2026 | Lusitânia Lourosa | 9 | (0) |
| 2026– | Fafe | 5 | (0) |

International career^{‡}
| 2016 | Portugal U19 | 2 | (0) |
| 2016–2017 | Portugal U20 | 6 | (0) |
| 2022– | Guinea-Bissau | 1 | (0) |
- * Club domestic league appearances and goals as of 13 September 2026 ‡ National team caps and goals as of 6 June 2022

Atair Mimito Rocha Biai (born 12 December 1997), known as Mimito Biai, is a Bissau-Guinean professional footballer who plays as a midfielder for Liga 3 club Fafe and the Guinea-Bissau national team.

== Club career ==
On 11 September 2016, Biai made his professional debut with Vitória Guimarães B in a 2016–17 LigaPro match against Portimonense. In June 2022, he joined Bulgarian club Cherno More. In January 2023, Biai signed a contract with Romanian team Argeș Pitești.

On 25 March 2025, Armenian Premier League club Pyunik announced the signing of Biai. On 9 June 2025, Pyunik announced that Biai had left the club.

On 13 July 2025, Biai returned to Portugal, signing a one-year contract with Liga Portugal 2 club Lusitânia.

== International career ==
Biai was born in Guinea Bissau and raised in Portugal. He is a former youth international for Portugal. He debuted with Guinea-Bissau in a friendly 3–0 win over Equatorial Guinea on 23 March 2022.
