= William (footballer, born 1996) =

Brazilian footballer

Personal information
- Full name: João William Alves de Jesus
- Date of birth: 11 June 1996 (age 30)
- Place of birth: Estância, Sergipe, Brazil
- Height: 1.86 m (6 ft 1 in)
- Position: Defender

Team information
- Current team: River

Youth career
- 2014–2015: Estanciano

Senior career*
Years	Team	Apps	(Gls)
2015	Estanciano	3	(0)
2016	Juventude	2	(0)
2016	→ Concórdia (loan)	4	(0)
2017–2018	Luverdense	27	(2)
2018	Goiás	0	(0)
2019	Santa Cruz	7	(0)
2020–2021	Rukh Brest	27	(1)
2022–2023	Inhulets Petrove	0	(0)
2022	→ Dinamo Minsk (loan)	4	(1)
2023	→ Campinense (loan)	12	(0)
2023–2024	Alashkert	18	(0)
2025	Central	1	(0)
2025–	River	6	(0)
- * Club domestic league appearances and goals as of 1 March 2025

João William Alves de Jesus (born 11 June 1996), better known as just William, is a Brazilian professional footballer for River.
