= Agdon Menezes =

Brazilian footballer (born 1993)

Personal information
- Full name: Agdon Santos Menezes
- Date of birth: 26 January 1993 (age 33)
- Place of birth: Salvador, Bahia, Brazil
- Height: 1.76 m (5 ft 9 1/2 in)
- Position: Forward

Team information
- Current team: Crato

Youth career
- 2012–2013: Vitória

Senior career*
Years	Team	Apps	(Gls)
2014–2016	Braga B	46	(4)
2016–2018	Merelinense	48	(20)
2018–2020	Oliveirense	54	(20)
2020–2021	Feirense	8	(0)
2021–2022	Varzim	42	(1)
2022–2024	Ararat-Armenia	11	(3)
2023–2024	→ Alashkert (loan)	42	(5)
2024–2025	Pyunik	22	(6)
2026–	Crato		
- * Club domestic league appearances and goals as of 22 April 2026

Agdon Santos Menezes (born 26 January 1993), sometimes known as just Agdon, is a Brazilian professional footballer who plays as a forward, for Campeonato Cearense Série B club Crato.

== Career ==
Born in Salvador, Bahia, Agdon Menezes is a youth product of Esporte Clube Vitória, playing for two seasons with their under-20 side and helping them win the Copa do Brasil Sub-20 in 2012. On 3 January 2014, he joined S.C. Braga, in the Portuguese Primeira Liga, being immediately assigned to their B-team.

Agdon Menezes made his professional debut on 9 March 2014 in home draw against F.C. Penafiel. After two years with Braga, he signed with Merelinense F.C. from the Campeonato de Portugal.

On 30 May 2018, Agdon Menezes signed a two-year contract at LigaPro club U.D. Oliveirense. With 13 goals, he was the top scorer of the 2019–20 season, which was curtailed with 11 games remaining by the COVID-19 pandemic.

Agdon Menezes switched to another team in the same division, C.D. Feirense, on 1 August 2020. After eight scoreless games, he moved the following 27 January to last-placed club Varzim S.C. on an undisclosed contract.

On 4 July 2022, Ararat-Armenia announced the signing of Agdon.

On 16 January 2023, Agdon joined Alashkert on loan for the remainder of the season alongside teammate Wbeymar.

On 7 July 2024, Armenian Premier League club Pyunik announced the signing of Agdon. On 4 June 2025, Pyunik announced the departure of Alemão.

On 23 February 2026, Crato announced the signing of Agdon.
