= Sodiq Fatai =

Nigerian footballer (born 1996)

Personal information
- Full name: Sodiq Olamilekan Fatai
- Date of birth: 4 June 1996 (age 30)
- Place of birth: Lagos, Nigeria
- Height: 1.78 m (5 ft 10 in)
- Position: Right winger

Team information
- Current team: Hapoel Ramat Gan Givatayim
- Number: 77

Senior career*
Years	Team	Apps	(Gls)
2014–2015	Ribeirão	8	(0)
2015	AD Oliveirense	14	(3)
2016–2020	Paços de Ferreira	31	(1)
2016	→ Gil Vicente (loan)	14	(2)
2016–2017	→ Leixões (loan)	37	(3)
2017–2018	→ Sporting Covilhã (loan)	35	(6)
2019–2020	→ Chaves (loan)	21	(0)
2020–2021	Varzim	31	(2)
2021–2022	Académica	31	(1)
2022–2023	Sporting da Covilhã	21	(0)
2023–2024	Alashkert	32	(1)
2024–2025	Penafiel	25	(1)
2025–2026	Omonia Aradippou	14	(0)
2026–	Hapoel Ramat Gan Givatayim	11	(1)
- * Club domestic league appearances and goals as of 24 June 2026

Sodiq Olamilekan Fatai (born 4 June 1996) is a Nigerian professional football player who plays for Liga Leumit club Hapoel Ramat Gan Givatayim.

== Club career ==
He made his professional debut in the Segunda Liga for Gil Vicente on 7 February 2016 in a game against Famalicão.
