= 2021–22 FC Alashkert season =

Alashkert
2021-22 season
- Chairman: Bagrat Navoyan
- Manager: Aleksandr Grigoryan (until 20 September); Milan Milanović (26 September-13 January); Aram Voskanyan (from 13 January)
- Stadium: Alashkert Stadium
- Premier League: 3rd
- Armenian Cup: Quarterfinal vs Urartu
- Supercup: Winners
- Champions League: Second qualifying round vs Sheriff Tiraspol
- Europa League: Play-off round vs Rangers
- Europa Conference League: Group stage
- Top goalscorer: League: José Embaló (7); All: José Embaló (12)
- Highest home attendance: 7,000 vs Kairat (12 August 2021)
- Lowest home attendance: 250 vs Noah (27 October 2021)
- Average home league attendance: 2,364 (8 November 2021)
Home colours	Away colours

The 2021–22 season was Alashkert's tenth season in the Armenian Premier League and fifteenth overall.

== Season events ==
On 1 July, Alashkert announced the signing of José Embaló from Olimpia Grudziądz, with Aghvan Davoyan, Béko Fofana, Artak Yedigaryan, David Khurtsidze, Deou Dosa and James all signing the following day.

On 16 July, Alashkert announced the signings of Vladislav Kryuchkov, Aghvan Papikyan and Levon Bayramyan.

On 22 July, Alashkert announced that Aleksandr Grigoryan had left the club by mutual consent due to his wife's poor health, returning to the club on 31 July.

On 15 August, Alashkert announced the signing of Lucas Serra from Canaã.

On 3 September, Alashkert announced the signing of Marko Milinković who'd previously played for Giresunspor.

On 11 September, Alashkert announced the signing of Brazilian forwards Matheus Alessandro and Nixon. The following day, 11 September, Alashkert announced the signings of Artem Gyurjyan and Yevgeni Yatchenko.

On 20 September, Aleksandr Grigoryan left his role as Head Coach, with Milan Milanović being appointed as Alashkerts new Head Coach on 26 September.

On 13 January, Alashkert announced that Milan Milanović had left his role as Head Coach after his contract had expired, with Aram Voskanyan being announced as his replacement.

On 25 January, Alashkert announced the signing of Dmitry Guz from Atyrau. The following day, 26 January, Alashkert announced the signing of Manvel Agaronyan from Luki-Energiya Velikiye Luki, with Alexey Rodionov joining on 27 January from Atyrau.

On 3 February, Alashkert announced the signing of Vahagn Ayvazyan, Gagik Daghbashyan and Andranik Voskanyan from Van. The following day Alashkert announced the signing of Alexander Ter-Tovmasyan from Pyunik, with Aleksandr Karapetyan joining the following day after he'd left Noah earlier in the transfer window.

On 23 February, Alashkert announced the signings of Vitinho from Urartu and Artyom Potapov from Kaisar.

== Squad ==
As of match played 28 May 2022

Number	Name	Nationality	Position	Date of birth (age)	Signed from	Signed in	Contract ends	Apps.	Goals
Goalkeepers
1	Sevak Aslanyan	(Armenia)	GK	17 May 1998 (aged 24)	Unattached	2022		0	0
22	Ognjen Čančarević	(Serbia)	GK	25 September 1989 (aged 32)	Radnik Surdulica	2018		139	0
25	Artyom Potapov	(Russia)	GK	28 June 1994 (aged 27)	Kaisar	2022		2	0
Defenders
2	Tiago Cametá	(Brazil)	DF	5 May 1992 (aged 30)	Vila Nova	2019		101	0
3	Taron Voskanyan	(Armenia)	DF	22 February 1993 (aged 29)	Nea Salamis Famagusta	2018		132	4
4	Dmitry Guz	(Russia)	DF	15 May 1988 (aged 34)	Atyrau	2022		16	0
5	Didier Kadio	(Ivory Coast)	DF	5 April 1990 (aged 32)	Al-Hilal	2021		61	1
8	Gagik Daghbashyan	(Armenia)	DF	19 October 1990 (aged 31)	Unattached	2022		141	1
19	Deou Dosa	(Nigeria)	DF	29 July 1998 (aged 23)	Van	2021		5	1
33	Andranik Voskanyan	(Armenia)	DF	11 April 1990 (aged 32)	Unattached	2022		11	0
94	Karapet Manukyan	(Armenia)	DF	21 July 1992 (aged 29)	West Armenia	2021		6	1
97	Yevgeni Yatchenko	(Russia)	DF	25 August 1986 (aged 35)	Unattached	2021		10	0
98	Vahagn Ayvazyan	(Armenia)	DF	16 April 1992 (aged 30)	Unattached	2022		12	2
Midfielders
7	Wangu Gome	(Namibia)	MF	13 February 1993 (aged 29)	Cape Umoya United	2020		75	5
10	Marko Milinković	(Serbia)	MF	16 April 1988 (aged 34)	Unattached	2021		29	4
11	Manvel Agaronyan	(Russia)	MF	30 November 1997 (aged 24)	Luki-Energiya Velikiye Luki	2022		1	0
16	Albert Mnatsakanyan	(Armenia)	MF	9 September 1999 (aged 22)	Unattached	2022		3	1
17	Artak Yedigaryan	(Armenia)	MF	18 March 1990 (aged 32)	Ararat Yerevan	2021		175	36
20	Aghvan Papikyan	(Armenia)	MF	8 February 1994 (aged 28)	Ararat Yerevan	2021		23	0
21	Artak Grigoryan	(Armenia)	MF	19 October 1987 (aged 34)	Mika	2015		227	5
23	Levon Bayramyan	(Russia)	MF	17 January 1998 (aged 24)	Krasnodar	2021		0	0
27	David Khurtsidze	(Russia)	MF	4 July 1993 (aged 28)	Ararat Yerevan	2021		44	7
55	Kódjo	(Ivory Coast)	MF	28 May 1993 (aged 29)	Taraz	2022		14	0
88	James	(Brazil)	MF	15 July 1995 (aged 26)	Urartu	2021		42	2
95	Vitinho	(Brazil)	MF	8 September 1997 (aged 24)	Urartu	2022		5	0
96	Erik Soghomonyan	(Armenia)	MF	2 April 1999 (aged 23)	Youth team	2020		14	0
Forwards
9	Aleksandr Karapetyan	(Armenia)	FW	23 December 1987 (aged 34)	Unattached	2022		3	0
15	Béko Fofana	(Ivory Coast)	FW	8 September 1988 (aged 33)	IMT	2021		30	4
70	José Embaló	(Guinea-Bissau)	FW	3 May 1993 (aged 29)	Olimpia Grudziądz	2021		43	12
77	Alexey Rodionov	(Kazakhstan)	FW	29 March 1994 (aged 28)	Atyrau	2022		7	0
85	Alexander Ter-Tovmasyan	(Armenia)	FW	1 June 2003 (aged 18)	Pyunik	2022		2	0
86	Grigor Nikoghosyan	(Armenia)	FW		Youth team	2021		1	0
99	Nikita Tankov	(Russia)	FW	20 September 1996 (aged 25)	Dnepr Smolensk	2019		75	11
Away on loan
Left during the season
1	David Yurchenko	(Armenia)	GK	27 March 1986 (aged 36)	Shakhter Karagandy	2021		19	0
4	Mihailo Jovanović	(Serbia)	DF	15 February 1989 (aged 33)	Valletta	2021		14	1
8	Lucas Serra	(Brazil)	MF	9 November 1994 (aged 27)	Canaã	2021		1	0
9	Rumyan Hovsepyan	(Armenia)	MF	13 November 1991 (aged 30)	Arda Kardzhali	2020		50	2
10	Aleksandar Glišić	(Bosnia and Herzegovina)	FW	3 September 1992 (aged 29)	Urartu	2020		73	22
11	Aghvan Davoyan	(Armenia)	DF	21 March 1990 (aged 32)	Shirak	2021		4	0
16	Vincent Bezecourt	(France)	MF	10 June 1993 (aged 28)	Miami	2021		36	2
33	Dejan Boljević	(Montenegro)	DF	30 May 1990 (aged 31)	Taraz	2021		35	2
55	Vladislav Kryuchkov	(Russia)	DF	24 August 1989 (aged 32)	Noah	2021		18	0
77	Grigor Aghekyan	(Armenia)	FW	6 April 1996 (aged 26)	Gandzasar Kapan	2020	2022	21	0
85	Matheus Alessandro	(Brazil)	FW	10 July 1996 (aged 25)	Unattached	2021		4	0
86	Nixon	(Brazil)	FW	20 June 1992 (aged 29)	Unattached	2021		6	0
94	Ashot Kocharyan	(Armenia)	DF	13 July 1999 (aged 22)	Gandzasar Kapan	2021		1	0
94	Artem Gyurjyan	(Armenia)	DF	6 July 2000 (aged 21)	Kazanka Moscow	2021		1	0
97	David Davidyan	(Russia)	MF	14 December 1997 (aged 24)	Ararat Yerevan	2020		30	7
98	Branko Mihajlović	(Serbia)	FW	20 February 1991 (aged 31)	Mačva Šabac	2021		26	1

== Transfers ==
=== In ===
Date	Position	Nationality	Name	From	Fee	Ref.
1 July 2021	FW	(Guinea-Bissau)	José Embaló	Olimpia Grudziądz	Undisclosed	
2 July 2021	DF	(Armenia)	Aghvan Davoyan	Shirak	Undisclosed	
2 July 2021	DF	(Armenia)	Artak Yedigaryan	Ararat Yerevan	Undisclosed	
2 July 2021	DF	(Nigeria)	Deou Dosa	Van	Undisclosed	
2 July 2021	MF	(Brazil)	James	Urartu	Undisclosed	
2 July 2021	MF	(Russia)	David Khurtsidze	Ararat Yerevan	Undisclosed	
2 July 2021	FW	(Ivory Coast)	Béko Fofana	IMT	Undisclosed	
16 July 2021	DF	(Russia)	Vladislav Kryuchkov	Noah	Undisclosed	
16 July 2021	MF	(Armenia)	Aghvan Papikyan	Ararat Yerevan	Undisclosed	
16 July 2021	MF	(Russia)	Levon Bayramyan	Krasnodar	Undisclosed	
15 August 2021	MF	(Brazil)	Lucas Serra	Canaã	Undisclosed	
3 September 2021	MF	(Serbia)	Marko Milinković	Unattached	Free	
10 September 2021	FW	(Brazil)	Matheus Alessandro	Unattached	Free	
10 September 2021	MF	(Brazil)	Nixon	Unattached	Free	
11 September 2021	DF	(Russia)	Artem Gyurjyan	Unattached	Free	
11 September 2021	DF	(Russia)	Yevgeni Yatchenko	Unattached	Free	
25 January 2022	DF	(Russia)	Dmitry Guz	Atyrau	Undisclosed	
26 January 2022	MF	(Russia)	Manvel Agaronyan	Luki-Energiya Velikiye Luki	Undisclosed	
27 January 2022	FW	(Kazakhstan)	Alexey Rodionov	Atyrau	Undisclosed	
3 February 2022	DF	(Armenia)	Vahagn Ayvazyan	Unattached	Free	
3 February 2022	DF	(Armenia)	Gagik Daghbashyan	Unattached	Free	
3 February 2022	DF	(Armenia)	Andranik Voskanyan	Unattached	Free	
4 February 2022	FW	(Armenia)	Alexander Ter-Tovmasyan	Pyunik	Undisclosed	
5 February 2022	FW	(Armenia)	Aleksandr Karapetyan	Unattached	Free	
20 February 2022	GK	(Armenia)	Sevak Aslanyan	Unattached	Free	
23 February 2022	GK	(Russia)	Artyom Potapov	Kaisar	Undisclosed	
23 February 2022	MF	(Brazil)	Vitinho	Urartu	Undisclosed	
24 February 2022	MF	(Ivory Coast)	Kódjo	Taraz	Undisclosed	
4 March 2022	MF	(Armenia)	Albert Mnatsakanyan	Unattached	Free	

=== Out ===
Date	Position	Nationality	Name	To	Fee	Ref.
17 June 2021	DF	(Armenia)	Vaspurak Minasyan	Pyunik	Undisclosed	
8 August 2021	MF	(Russia)	David Davidyan	Khimki	Undisclosed	
19 December 2021	MF	(France)	Vincent Bezecourt	Geylang International	Undisclosed	
3 March 2022	FW	(Brazil)	Nixon	Juazeirense	Undisclosed	

=== Released ===
Date	Position	Nationality	Name	Joined	Date	Ref.
2 June 2021	GK	(Armenia)	Gevorg Kasparov	Retired		
31 December 2021	GK	(Armenia)	David Yurchenko	Pyunik	1 February 2022	
31 December 2021	DF	(Armenia)	Aghvan Davoyan	Retired		
31 December 2021	DF	(Montenegro)	Dejan Boljević	Teplice	24 January 2022	
31 December 2021	DF	(Russia)	Vladislav Kryuchkov	Forte Taganrog	21 January 2022	
31 December 2021	DF	(Serbia)	Mihailo Jovanović	Dinamo Samarqand		
31 December 2021	MF	(Armenia)	Rumyan Hovsepyan	Floriana	20 January 2022	
31 December 2021	MF	(Brazil)	Lucas Serra			
31 December 2021	FW	(Armenia)	Grigor Aghekyan			
31 December 2021	FW	(Bosnia and Herzegovina)	Aleksandar Glišić	Dinamo Samarqand	25 January 2022	
31 December 2021	FW	(Brazil)	Matheus Alessandro	Boavista	21 January 2022	
31 December 2021	FW	(Serbia)	Branko Mihajlović	Zvijezda 09		
31 May 2022	GK	(Russia)	Artyom Potapov	Ararat Yerevan	3 June 2022	
31 May 2022	DF	(Armenia)	Gagik Daghbashyan	West Armenia		
31 May 2022	DF	(Russia)	Dmitry Guz	Kaluga		
31 May 2022	DF	(Russia)	Yevgeni Yatchenko			
31 May 2022	MF	(Armenia)	Albert Mnatsakanyan	Kuban-Holding Pavlovskaya		
31 May 2022	MF	(Armenia)	Aghvan Papikyan	Wisła Puławy		
31 May 2022	MF	(Armenia)	Erik Soghomonyan	West Armenia		
31 May 2022	MF	(Brazil)	Vitinho	Telavi		
31 May 2022	MF	(Ivory Coast)	Kódjo Kassé Alphonse			
31 May 2022	MF	(Russia)	Manvel Agaronyan	Luki-Energiya Velikiye Luki		
31 May 2022	MF	(Russia)	Levon Bayramyan	SKA Rostov-on-Don		
31 May 2022	MF	(Serbia)	Marko Milinković	Metalac Gornji Milanovac		
31 May 2022	FW	(Guinea-Bissau)	José Embaló	Sabah		
31 May 2022	FW	(Kazakhstan)	Alexey Rodionov			
31 May 2022	FW	(Russia)	Nikita Tankov	Yadro St.Petersburg		

== Friendlies ==
30 January 2022	Alashkert	0–0	Van	Yerevan
13:00 (UTC+4)		Report		Stadium: FFA Academy Stadium

== Competitions ==
=== Overall record ===
Competition	First match	Last match	Starting round	Final position	Record							
Competition	First match	Last match	Starting round	Final position	Pld	W	D	L	GF	GA	GD	Win %
Premier League	1 August 2021	28 May 2022	Matchday 1	3rd	32	14	9	9	38	30	+8	43.75
Armenian Cup	21 November 2021	21 November 2021	Quarterfinal	Quarterfinal	1	0	0	1	0	2	−2	0.00
Supercup	24 September 2021		Final	Winners	1	1	0	0	1	0	+1	100.00
UEFA Champions League	7 July 2021	28 July 2021	First qualifying round	Second qualifying round	4	1	1	2	4	6	−2	25.00
UEFA Europa League	5 August 2021	26 August 2021	Third qualifying round	Playoff round	4	1	2	1	3	3	+0	25.00
UEFA Europa Conference League	14 September 2021	9 December 2021	Group stage	Group stage (4th)	5	0	0	5	3	14	−11	0.00
Total					47	17	12	18	49	55	−6	36.17

Last updated: 28 May 2022
Source: Competitions

=== Supercup ===
24 September 2021	Alashkert	1–0	Ararat Yerevan	Yerevan
18:30 (UTC+4)	Boljević (yellow card) 13'; Embaló 55'; Gome (yellow card) 76'; Yurchenko (yellow card) 91'	Report	Mkoyan (yellow card) 89'	Stadium: FFA Academy Stadium; Attendance: 800; Referee: Ashot Ghaltakchyan

=== Premier League ===
==== Results summary ====
Overall								Home						Away					
Pld	W	D	L	GF	GA	GD	Pts	W	D	L	GF	GA	GD	W	D	L	GF	GA	GD
30	14	7	9	37	29	+8	49	7	4	5	18	18	0	7	3	4	19	11	+8

Last updated: 28 May 2022.
Source: See Results

==== Results by round ====
Round	1	2	3	4	5	6	7	8	9	10	11	12	13	14	15	16	17	18	19	20	21	22	23	24	25	26	27	28	29	30	31	32	33	34	35	36
Ground	H	H	A	H	A	H	H	A	A	H	A	H	A	H (Note: Between matchday 15 and 16, Sevan were expelled from the league.)	A	A	H	H	A	H	A	H	A	A	H	H	A	A	H	H	H	H	A	A	A	H
Result	L	L	P	V	L	D	W	D	L	D	W	W	V	W	W	W	L	L	W	W	D	P	W	L	W	W	L	D	L	W	D	W	D	D	W	D
Position	6	9	9	9	9	9	9	9	9	9	7	7	7	7	5	5	5	5	4	4	4	4	4	4	4	4	4	4	4	4	4	4	4	3	3	3

Updated to match(es) played on 28 May 2022. Source: See Results
A = Away; H = Home; W = Win; D = Draw; L = Loss; P = Postponed; V = Void

==== Results ====
1 August 2021 1	Alashkert	0–3	Ararat-Armenia	Yerevan
17:00 (UTC+4)	Voskanyan (yellow card) 26'; Gome (yellow card) 87'; Kadio (yellow card) 90+4'	Report	Eza 61'; Otubanjo 67'; Wbeymar (yellow card) 73'; A.Avanesyan 75'	Stadium: Alashkert Stadium; Attendance: 500; Referee: Ashot Ghaltakchyan

15 August 2021 3	Alashkert	0–2	Van	Yerevan
17:00 (UTC+4)	Yedigaryan (yellow card) 17'; N.Tankov (yellow card) 24'; Glišić (yellow card) 47'	Report	V.Ayvazyan (yellow card) 46'; Stepanov (yellow card) 47'; V.Filippov 51'; Badoyan 59'; E.Essien (yellow card) 81'	Stadium: Alashkert Stadium; Attendance: 250; Referee: Artem Gasparyan

20 August 2021 4	Urartu	v	Alashkert	Yerevan
(UTC+4)				Stadium: Alashkert Stadium
Note: Match postponed due to Alashkert's participation in the UEFA Europa League Playoff round.

23 August 2021 5	Alashkert	v	Sevan	Yerevan
17:00 (UTC+4)	A.Davoyan (yellow card) 7'; N.Tankov (yellow card) 24'; Kryuchkov (yellow card) 41'; Embaló (yellow card) 62'	Report	Duranski (yellow card) 57'; Kartashyan (yellow card) 62'; Rudoselsky (yellow card) 70'; A.Mensalão (yellow card) 84'	Stadium: Alashkert Stadium; Attendance: 400; Referee: Henrik Nalbandyan
Note: Match void on 1 December.

11 September 2021 6	Ararat Yerevan	3–2	Alashkert	Yerevan
17:00 (UTC+4)	Déblé 31', 44' (red card) 70'; Y.Silue 76'	Report	Glišić 29' (yellow card) 45'; Embaló 90' (pen.); Milinković (yellow card) 90'	Stadium: Republican Stadium; Attendance: 400; Referee: Henrik Nalbandyan

20 September 2021 7	Alashkert	0–0	Noravank	Yerevan
16:00 (UTC+4)	Embaló (yellow card) 71'; Jovanović (yellow card) 75'	Report	Zonjić (yellow card) 71'; D.Cubrakovic (yellow card) 90+3'	Stadium: Alashkert Stadium; Attendance: 500; Referee: Ashot Ghaltakchyan

27 September 2021 8	Alashkert	2–1	BKMA Yerevan	Yerevan
16:00 (UTC+4)	Khurtsidze 36'; Fofana 82'	Report	Ishkhanyan (yellow card) 65'; A.Serobyan 77'	Stadium: Alashkert Stadium; Attendance: 250; Referee: Artem Gasparyan

15 October 2021 9	Pyunik	1–1	Alashkert	Yerevan
19:00 (UTC+4)	E.Vardanyan 32' (pen.) (yellow card) 78'; Hovhannisyan (yellow card) 84'; Buchnev (yellow card) 90'	Report	Grigoryan (yellow card) 38'; Glišić (yellow card) 44'; Kryuchkov (yellow card) 69'; Khurtsidze (yellow card) 73' Voskanyan 90'	Stadium: Republican Stadium; Attendance: 1,000; Referee: Artem Gasparyan

24 October 2021 10	Ararat-Armenia	2–1	Alashkert	Yerevan
20:00 (UTC+4)	Ambartsumyan 22'; Lima (yellow card) 33' (goal) 67'; Bueno (yellow card) 42'; Sanogo (yellow card) 90+4'	Report	Embaló 31'; Kadio (yellow card) 43'; James (yellow card) 90'	Stadium: FFA Academy Stadium; Referee: Henrik Nalbandyan

27 October 2021 11	Alashkert	0–0	Noah	Yerevan
14:00 (UTC+4)	Yedigaryan (yellow card) 39'; Cametá (yellow card) 43'	Report	S.Shahinyan (yellow card) 10'; S.Gomes (yellow card) 21'; Emsis (yellow card) 39'	Stadium: Alashkert Stadium; Attendance: 200; Referee: Vardan Manukyan

31 October 2021 12	Van	0–4	Alashkert	Charentsavan
15:00 (UTC+4)	D.Kuzkin (yellow card) 39'; A.Petrosyan (yellow card) 42'; Stepanov (yellow card) 57'	Report	Khurtsidze 23'; Jovanović 43' (yellow card) 69'; Milinković 81'; N.Tankov 88'; E.Soghomonyan (yellow card) 89'	Stadium: Charentsavan City Stadium; Attendance: 350; Referee: Shahen Aghayan

8 November 2021 13	Alashkert	2–1	Urartu	Yerevan
14:00 (UTC+4)	Milinković 29'; D.Dosa 45' (yellow card) 51'; Glišić (yellow card) 90'	Report	Ten (yellow card) 44'; Polyakov 54'	Stadium: Alashkert Stadium; Attendance: 300; Referee: Zaven Hovhannisyan

17 November 2021 14	Sevan	v	Alashkert	Sevan
14:00 (UTC+4)				Stadium: Sevan City Stadium
Note: Match postponed due to Sevan not arriving for the match. Match declared void on 1 December.

30 November 2021 15	Alashkert	1–0	Ararat Yerevan	Yerevan
14:00 (UTC+4)	Fofana 6'; Voskanyan (yellow card) 37'; Čančarević (yellow card) 63'; Glišić (yellow card) 79'; D.Dosa (yellow card) 88'	Report	Darbinyan (yellow card) 10'; Y.Silue (yellow card) 63'; J.Bravo (yellow card) 90+5'	Stadium: Alashkert Stadium; Attendance: 70; Referee: Zaven Hovhannisyan

4 December 2021 16	Noravank	0–2	Alashkert	Charentsavan
14:00 (UTC+4)	D.Quaye (yellow card) 70'	Report	Fofana 24'; Yedigaryan 84'	Stadium: Charentsavan City Stadium; Attendance: 50; Referee: Shahen Aghayan

12 December 2021 17	BKMA Yerevan	0–2	Alashkert	Yerevan
15:00 (UTC+4)	E.Piloyan (yellow card) 21'; D.Aghbalyan (yellow card) 48'	Report	Khurtsidze 19'; Embaló 82'; James (yellow card) 90'; Yatchenko (yellow card) 90+5'	Stadium: FFA Academy Stadium; Attendance: 100; Referee: Vardan Manukyan

21 February 2022 18	Alashkert	1–4	Pyunik	Yerevan
14:00 (UTC+4)	Embaló 53'; Fofana (yellow card) 89'	Report	González (yellow card) 11'; Déblé 45+1', 59', 60'; Cociuc (yellow card) 45+3'; Gajić 66'	Stadium: Urartu Stadium; Referee: Shahen Aghayan

25 February 2022 19	Alashkert	0–1	Ararat-Armenia	Yerevan
14:00 (UTC+4)	V.Ayvazyan (yellow card) 27'	Report	Terteryan (yellow card) 17'; Romércio (yellow card) 54' (goal) 90+7'	Stadium: Alashkert Stadium; Referee: Henrik Nalbandyan

1 March 2022 20	Noah	0–1	Alashkert	Armavir
15:00 (UTC+4)	G.Matevosyan (yellow card) 57'; C.Ikechukwu (yellow card) 65'; Oancea (yellow card) 90+2'	Report	Gome (yellow card) 16'; Grigoryan (yellow card) 29'; Yedigaryan 66'; Cametá (yellow card) 90+1'	Stadium: Armavir City Stadium; Referee: Zaven Hovhannisyan

5 March 2022 21	Alashkert	2–0	Van	Yerevan
14:00 (UTC+4)	Yedigaryan 34' (yellow card) 47'; Fofana (yellow card) 41'; V.Ayvazyan 64'; Papikyan (yellow card) 68'	Report	E.Mireku (yellow card) 20'	Stadium: Alashkert Stadium

9 March 2022 22	Urartu	0–0	Alashkert	Yerevan
18:00 (UTC+4)		Report	Gome (yellow card) 79'	Stadium: Alashkert Stadium; Referee: Zaven Hovhannisyan

14–16 March 2022 23	Alashkert	BYE	Sevan	Yerevan
(UTC+4)				Stadium: Alashkert Stadium
Note: Sevan expelled from the league on 1 December 2021.

19 March 2022 24	Ararat Yerevan	0–1	Alashkert	Yerevan
15:30 (UTC+4)	J.Bravo (yellow card) 89'	Report	V.Ayvazyan (yellow card) 22'; Embaló 49' (yellow card) 89'	Stadium: Republican Stadium; Referee: Shahen Aghayan

2 April 2022 2	Noah	1–0	Alashkert	Yerevan
14:00 (UTC+4)	C.Ikechukwu 90'	Report	Kadio (yellow card) 49'; Kódjo (yellow card) 79'	Stadium: Alashkert Stadium; Referee: Artem Gasparyan
Note: Match originally scheduled for 8 August, but postponed on 4 August due to Alashkert's participation in the UEFA Europa League Third qualifying round.

6 April 2022 25	Alashkert	3–0	Noravank	Yerevan
15:00 (UTC+4)	Mustafin 10' (o.g.); Gome (yellow card) 24' (yellow-red card) 38' (goal) 30'; V.Ayvazyan 53'	Report		Stadium: Alashkert Stadium; Referee: Zaven Hovhannisyan

11 April 2022 26	Alashkert	3–1	BKMA Yerevan	Yerevan
15:00 (UTC+4)	James 2'; Milinković (yellow card) 49' (goal) 79'; Grigoryan (yellow card) 85' (yellow-red card) 86'; N.Tankov 90+4'	Report	A.Serobyan 51' (pen.)	Stadium: Alashkert Stadium; Referee: Vardan Manukyan

15 April 2022 27	Pyunik	3–0	Alashkert	Yerevan
18:00 (UTC+4)	Harutyunyan (yellow card) 27'; Cociuc (yellow card) 29'; Firmino 35'; Ghazaryan 55'; Déblé 65' Yurchenko (yellow card) 83'	Report	Guz (yellow card) 8'; Daghbashyan (yellow card) 50'; Embaló (yellow card) 58'	Stadium: Republican Stadium; Referee: Henrik Nalbandyan

19 April 2022 28	Ararat-Armenia	1–1	Alashkert	Yerevan
19:00 (UTC+4)	V.Vimercati (yellow card) 70'; Alemão (yellow card) 70'; J.Duarte 83'	Report	Kadio (yellow card) 45+1'; Khurtsidze 90'	Stadium: FFA Academy Stadium; Referee: Artem Gasparyan

23 April 2022 29	Alashkert	0–2	Noah	Yerevan
15:00 (UTC+4)	Cametá (yellow card) 25'; Kadio (yellow card) 90+1'	Report	Spătaru (yellow card) 38'; Mayrovich 45+2'; Oancea 77'	Stadium: Alashkert Stadium; Referee: Henrik Nalbandyan

28 April 2022 30	Van	0–1	Alashkert	Charentsavan
15:00 (UTC+4)	E.Mireku (yellow card) 26'; J.Gaba (yellow card) 55'	Report	Fofana 10'; Khurtsidze (yellow card) 45+2'; Vitinho (yellow card) 71'; A.Potapov (yellow card) 88'	Stadium: Charentsavan City Stadium; Referee: Shahen Aghayan

3 May 2022 31	Alashkert	1–1	Urartu	Yerevan
16:00 (UTC+4)	Embaló 77'; Milinković (yellow card) 90+2'	Report	N.Antwi (yellow card) 35'; K.Melkonyan 44'; Margaryan (yellow card) 84'	Stadium: Alashkert Stadium; Referee: Vardan Manukyan

9–11 May 2022 32	Sevan	v	Alashkert	Sevan
(UTC+4)				Stadium: Sevan City Stadium
Note: Sevan expelled from the league on 1 December 2021.

15 May 2022 33	Ararat Yerevan	2–1	Alashkert	Yerevan
16:00 (UTC+4)	James 88'; Kadio 17' (yellow card) 68'; Embaló (yellow card) 36' (yellow-red card) 36'; Čančarević (yellow card) 86'	Report	Manoyan (yellow card) 37'; Stanojević 65' (pen.); C.Ouguehi (yellow card) 73'	Stadium: Alashkert Stadium; Referee: Zaven Hovhannisyan

18 May 2022 4	Urartu	0–0	Alashkert	Yerevan
19:00 (UTC+4)	Ten (yellow card) 85'	Report	Grigoryan (yellow card) 79'	Stadium: Alashkert Stadium; Referee: Artem Gasparyan
Note: Match originally scheduled for 20 August 2021, but postponed due to Alashkert's participation in the UEFA Europa League Playoff round.

22 May 2022 34	Noravank	1–1	Alashkert	Yerevan
16:45 (UTC+4)	Rudoselsky (yellow card) 41'; A.Mkrtchyan (yellow card) 61'; Ibrahim 81'	Report	Milinković 74'	Stadium: FFA Academy Stadium; Referee: Zaven Hovhannisyan

25 May 2022 35	BKMA Yerevan	0–3	Alashkert	Yerevan
17:30 (UTC+4)	Khachumyan (yellow card) 56'; A.Nersesyan (yellow card) 70'; S.Mkrtchyan (yellow card) 73'	Report	Mnatsakanyan 27'; Cametá (yellow card) 45'; Khurtsidze 47'; Embaló 70'; A.Ter-Tovmasyan (yellow card) 90+3'	Stadium: FFA Academy Stadium; Referee: Shahen Aghayan

28 May 2022 36	Alashkert	1–1	Pyunik	Yerevan
14:00 (UTC+4)	T.Voskanyan (yellow card) 35'; Grigoryan (yellow card) 42'; K.Manukyan 61'; Daghbashyan (yellow card) 88'	Report	Nenadović 6'; Higor (yellow card) 86'	Stadium: Alashkert Stadium; Referee: Sargis Khachatryan

==== Table ====
Pos	Team	Pld	W	D	L	GF	GA	GD	Pts	Qualification or relegation
1	Pyunik (C)	32	23	6	3	52	25	+27	75	Qualification for the Champions League first qualifying round
2	Ararat-Armenia	32	23	5	4	56	20	+36	74	Qualification for the Europa Conference League second qualifying round (Note: The 2021–22 Armenian Cup winners, Noravank, did not obtain an UEFA license and was replaced.)
3	Alashkert	32	14	9	9	38	30	+8	51	Qualification for the Europa Conference League first qualifying round
4	Ararat Yerevan	32	13	7	12	47	36	+11	46	Qualification for the Europa Conference League first qualifying round
5	Urartu	32	9	13	10	37	32	+5	40	
6	Noah	32	9	12	11	38	43	−5	39	
7	Noravank	32	7	7	18	36	55	−19	28	
8	Van	32	6	7	19	19	47	−28	25	
9	BKMA (O)	32	4	6	22	25	60	−35	18	Qualification to the relegation play-offs
10	Sevan (D, R)	0	0	0	0	0	0	0	0	Relegation to the Armenian First League (Note: Sevan was expelled from the league on 1 December 2021.)

Source: FFA Soccerway
Rules for classification: 1) Points; 2) Head-to-head points; 3) Head-to-head goal difference; 4) Head-to-head goals scored; 5) Matches won; 6) Goal difference; 7) Less red cards; 8) Less yellow cards; 9) Fair-play ranking 10) Draw
(C) Champions; (D) Disqualified; (O) Play-off winners; (R) Relegated

=== Armenian Cup ===
21 November 2021 Quarterfinal	Urartu	2–0	Alashkert	Yerevan
18:30 (UTC+4)	Désiré 30'; Paramonov (yellow card) 42'; Polyakov (yellow card) 49'; Grigoryan (yellow card) 53'; Hakobyan (yellow card) 73' (goal) 78'; Vitinho (yellow card) 80'; Beglaryan (yellow card) 80'	Report	Gome (yellow card) 20'; Voskanyan (yellow card) 45'; Cametá (yellow card) 74'	Stadium: Urartu Stadium; Attendance: 700; Referee: Henrik Nalbandyan

=== UEFA Champions League ===
==== Qualifying rounds ====
7 July 2021 First qualifying round 1st leg	Connah's Quay Nomads (Wales)	2–2	(Armenia) Alashkert	Aberystwyth, Wales
22:00 (UTC+4)	Curran 19'; J.Mullan (yellow card) 65'; Horan 79'; D.Poole (yellow card) 82'	Report	Khurtsidze 21', 45'	Stadium: Park Avenue; Attendance: 145; Referee: Vasilis Dimitriou (Cyprus)
Note: Match played at Park Avenue, Aberystwyth instead of Connah's Quay Nomads Deeside Stadium, Connah's Quay, due to it not meeting UEFA requirements

14 July 2021 First qualifying round 2nd leg	Alashkert (Armenia)	1–0 (a.e.t.) (3–2 agg.)	(Wales) Connah's Quay Nomads	Yerevan, Armenia
19:00 (UTC+4)	Glišić (yellow card) 45+5'; Kadio (yellow card) 53'; Aghekyan (yellow card) 93'; Bezecourt 113'	Report	Insall (yellow card) 45+5'; J.Disney (yellow card) 62'	Stadium: Republican Stadium; Attendance: 4,000; Referee: Ondřej Pechanec (Czech Republic)
Note: Match played at the Vazgen Sargsyan Republican Stadium in Yerevan, instead of Alashkert's regular stadium Alashkert Stadium, Yerevan, which did not meet UEFA requirements.

20 July 2021 Second qualifying round 1st leg	Alashkert (Armenia)	0–1	(Moldova) Sheriff Tiraspol	Yerevan, Armenia
19:00 (UTC+4)	James (yellow card) 17'; Khurtsidze (yellow card) 30'	Report	Luvannor 84'	Stadium: Republican Stadium; Attendance: 5,800; Referee: Rade Obrenovič (Slovenia)
Note: Match played at the Vazgen Sargsyan Republican Stadium in Yerevan, instead of Alashkert's regular stadium Alashkert Stadium, Yerevan, which did not meet UEFA requirements.

28 July 2021 Second qualifying round 2nd leg	Sheriff Tiraspol (Moldova)	3–1 (4–1 agg.)	(Armenia) Alashkert	Tiraspol, Moldova
21:00 (UTC+4)	Dulanto 15'; Luvannor 23'; Castañeda (yellow card) 67'; Thill 87' (pen.); Cristiano (yellow card) 90+1'	Report	Glišić 10'	Stadium: Sheriff Stadium; Attendance: 2,046; Referee: Bojan Pandžić (Sweden)

=== UEFA Europa League ===
==== Qualifying rounds ====
5 August 2021 Third qualifying round 1st leg	Kairat (Kazakhstan)	0–0	(Armenia) Alashkert	Almaty, Kazakhstan
18:00 (UTC+4)	Dugalić (yellow card) 35'; Alykulov (yellow card) 45'; Alip (yellow card) 78'; Usenov (yellow card) 90'	Report	Glišić (penalty missed) 36'; Grigoryan (yellow card) 45'	Stadium: Central Stadium; Attendance: 0 Referee: Aleksei Kulbakov (Belarus)
Note: Match played behind closed doors due to the COVID-19 pandemic in Kazakhstan

12 August 2021 Third qualifying round 2nd leg	Alashkert (Armenia)	3–2 (a.e.t.) (3–2 agg.)	(Kazakhstan) Kairat	Yerevan, Armenia
19:00 (UTC+4)	Embaló 43', 50'; Boljević (yellow card) 59'; Grigoryan (yellow card) 90+4'; Glišić 103' (yellow card) 104'; Čančarević (yellow card) 120+1'	Report	Alip (yellow card) 33'; Abiken 45+1' (yellow card) 91' (red card) 91'; Dugalić (yellow card) 47'; Kanté (yellow card) 54'; A.Shushenachev 61'; Palyakow (red card) 62'; A.Buranchiev (yellow card) 115'	Stadium: Republican Stadium; Attendance: 7,000; Referee: Lawrence Visser (Belgium)
Note: Match played at the Vazgen Sargsyan Republican Stadium in Yerevan, instead of Alashkert's regular stadium Alashkert Stadium, Yerevan, which did not meet UEFA requirements.

19 August 2021 Playoff round 1st leg	Rangers (Scotland)	1–0	(Armenia) Alashkert	Glasgow, Scotland
23:00 (UTC+4)	Lundstram (yellow card) 33' (yellow-red card) 43'; Morelos 67'; Davis (yellow card) 84'; Arfield (yellow card) 90+3'	Report	Boljević (yellow card) 16'; Gome (yellow card) 59'; James (yellow card) 73'	Stadium: Ibrox Stadium; Attendance: 42,649; Referee: Anastasios Sidiropoulos (Greece)

26 August 2021 Playoff round 2nd leg	Alashkert (Armenia)	0–0 (0–1 agg.)	(Scotland) Rangers	Yerevan, Armenia
19:00 (UTC+4)	James (yellow card) 37' (yellow-red card) 39'; Kryuchkov (yellow card) 90+3'	Report	Goldson (yellow card) 27'; Barišić (yellow card) 81'	Stadium: Republican Stadium; Attendance: 6,800; Referee: Tobias Stieler (Germany)
Note: Match played at the Vazgen Sargsyan Republican Stadium in Yerevan, instead of Alashkert's regular stadium Alashkert Stadium, Yerevan, which did not meet UEFA requirements.

=== UEFA Europa Conference League ===
==== Group stage ====
Pos	Team	Pld	W	D	L	GF	GA	GD	Pts	Qualification
1	(Austria) LASK	6	5	1	0	12	1	+11	16	Advance to round of 16
2	(Israel) Maccabi Tel Aviv	6	3	2	1	14	4	+10	11	Advance to knockout round play-offs
3	(Finland) HJK	6	2	0	4	5	15	−10	6	
4	(Armenia) Alashkert	6	0	1	5	4	15	−11	1	

Source: UEFA
Rules for classification: Group stage tiebreakers

14 September 2021 1	Maccabi Tel Aviv (Israel)	4–1	(Armenia) Alashkert	Tel Aviv, Israel
18:30 (UTC+4)	Perica 13' (yellow card) 77'; Guerrero (yellow card) 29'; Kanichowsky 32'; Biton 45+3' (pen.); Hozez 72'	Report	Embaló 17'; Mihajlović (yellow card) 45'; Voskanyan (yellow card) 45+2'; Glišić (yellow card) 60'	Stadium: Bloomfield Stadium; Attendance: 6,934; Referee: Espen Eskås (Norway)

30 September 2021 2	Alashkert (Armenia)	2–4	(Finland) HJK	Yerevan, Armenia
20:45 (UTC+4)	Grigoryan (yellow card) 2' (yellow-red card) 35'; Embaló 24'; Kadio (yellow card) 44'; Papikyan (yellow card) 85'; Glišić 90+3'	Report	Ri. Riski 8'; Valenčič 57'; Murillo (yellow card) 58'; Ro. Riski 63'; Sparv (yellow card) 65'; Olusanya 90+5'	Stadium: Republican Stadium; Attendance: 2,000; Referee: Horatiu Fesnic (Romania)
Note: Match played at the Republican Stadium in Yerevan, instead of Alashkert's regular Alashkert Stadium, Yerevan, which did not meet UEFA requirements.

21 October 2021 3	Alashkert (Armenia)	0–3	(Austria) LASK	Yerevan, Armenia
20:45 (UTC+4)		Report	Boller (yellow card) 27'; Monschein (penalty missed) 30'; Hong.H-s 35'; Potzmann (yellow card) 62'; Goiginger 68'; Michorl 90+2'	Stadium: Republican Stadium; Attendance: 1,500; Referee: Jens Maae (Denmark)
Note: Match played at the Republican Stadium in Yerevan, instead of Alashkert's regular Alashkert Stadium, Yerevan, which did not meet UEFA requirements.

4 November 2021 4	LASK (Austria)	2–0	(Armenia) Alashkert	Klagenfurt, Austria
21:45 (UTC+4)	Nakamura 12', 87'; Renner (yellow card) 66'	Report	Grigoryan (yellow card) 33'; Voskanyan (yellow card) 44'	Stadium: Wörthersee Stadion; Attendance: 400; Referee: Mohammed Al-Hakim (Sweden)
Note: LASK played their home matches at Wörthersee Stadion, Klagenfurt, instead of their regular stadium Linzer Stadion, Linz, due to renovation.

25 November 2021 5	HJK (Finland)	1–0	(Armenia) Alashkert	Helsinki, Finland
21:45 (UTC+4)	Lingman (yellow card) 11'; Tanaka (yellow card) 45' (goal) 48'	Report	Milinković (yellow card) 35'; Kryuchkov (yellow card) 43'; Voskanyan (yellow card) 62'	Stadium: Bolt Arena; Attendance: 4,424; Referee: Bram Van Driessche (Belgium)

9 December 2021 6	Alashkert (Armenia)	1–1	(Israel) Maccabi Tel Aviv	Yerevan, Armenia
21:45 (UTC+4)	Boljević 78'	Report	Shamir (yellow card) 86'; Almog 90'	Stadium: Republican Stadium; Attendance: 700; Referee: Gergő Bogár (Hungary)
Note: Match played at the Republican Stadium in Yerevan, instead of Alashkert's regular Alashkert Stadium, Yerevan, which did not meet UEFA requirements.

== Statistics ==
As of match played 28 May 2022

=== Appearances and goals ===
No.	Pos	Nat	Player	Total		Premier League		Armenian Cup		Supercup		UEFA Champions League		UEFA Europa League		UEFA Europa Conference League	
No.	Pos	Nat	Player	Apps	Goals	Apps	Goals	Apps	Goals	Apps	Goals	Apps	Goals	Apps	Goals	Apps	Goals
2	DF	(Brazil) BRA	Tiago Cametá	42	0	23+3	0	1	0	1	0	4	0	4	0	6	0
3	DF	(Armenia) ARM	Taron Voskanyan	27	1	10+3	1	1	0	1	0	4	0	4	0	4	0
4	DF	(Russia) RUS	Dmitry Guz	16	0	16	0	0	0	0	0	0	0	0	0	0	0
5	DF	(Ivory Coast) CIV	Didier Kadio	43	1	28+1	1	1	0	1	0	4	0	3	0	5	0
7	MF	(Namibia) NAM	Wangu Gome	37	1	20+5	1	1	0	0+1	0	0+2	0	0+3	0	4+1	0
8	DF	(Armenia) ARM	Gagik Daghbashyan	8	0	2+6	0	0	0	0	0	0	0	0	0	0	0
9	FW	(Armenia) ARM	Aleksandr Karapetyan	3	0	1+2	0	0	0	0	0	0	0	0	0	0	0
10	MF	(Serbia) SRB	Marko Milinković	29	4	10+12	4	1	0	0+1	0	0	0	0	0	2+3	0
11	MF	(Russia) RUS	Manvel Agaronyan	1	0	0+1	0	0	0	0	0	0	0	0	0	0	0
15	FW	(Ivory Coast) CIV	Béko Fofana	30	4	17+10	4	0+1	0	0+1	0	0	0	0+1	0	0	0
16	MF	(Armenia) ARM	Albert Mnatsakanyan	3	1	2+1	1	0	0	0	0	0	0	0	0	0	0
17	MF	(Armenia) ARM	Artak Yedigaryan	38	3	19+7	3	0+1	0	0	0	2+1	0	0+3	0	1+4	0
19	DF	(Nigeria) NGR	Deou Dosa	5	1	5	1	0	0	0	0	0	0	0	0	0	0
20	MF	(Armenia) ARM	Aghvan Papikyan	21	0	6+5	0	0+1	0	0	0	0+2	0	2+1	0	3+1	0
21	MF	(Armenia) ARM	Artak Grigoryan	44	0	23+6	0	1	0	1	0	4	0	4	0	5	0
22	GK	(Serbia) SRB	Ognjen Čančarević	36	0	25	0	1	0	0	0	2	0	4	0	4	0
25	GK	(Russia) RUS	Artyom Potapov	2	0	2	0	0	0	0	0	0	0	0	0	0	0
27	MF	(Russia) RUS	David Khurtsidze	44	7	23+7	5	0+1	0	1	0	4	2	4	0	3+1	0
33	DF	(Armenia) ARM	Andranik Voskanyan	11	0	6+5	0	0	0	0	0	0	0	0	0	0	0
55	MF	(Ivory Coast) CIV	Kódjo	14	0	3+11	0	0	0	0	0	0	0	0	0	0	0
70	FW	(Guinea-Bissau) GBS	José Embaló	43	12	20+8	7	1	0	1	1	3+1	0	3	2	5+1	2
77	FW	(Kazakhstan) KAZ	Alexey Rodionov	7	0	1+6	0	0	0	0	0	0	0	0	0	0	0
85	FW	(Armenia) ARM	Alexander Ter-Tovmasyan	2	0	0+2	0	0	0	0	0	0	0	0	0	0	0
86	FW	(Armenia) ARM	Grigor Nikoghosyan	1	0	0+1	0	0	0	0	0	0	0	0	0	0	0
88	MF	(Brazil) BRA	James	42	2	25+4	2	0	0	0	0	3+1	0	4	0	3+2	0
94	DF	(Armenia) ARM	Karapet Manukyan	6	1	1+5	1	0	0	0	0	0	0	0	0	0	0
95	MF	(Brazil) BRA	Vitinho	5	0	0+5	0	0	0	0	0	0	0	0	0	0	0
96	MF	(Armenia) ARM	Erik Soghomonyan	7	0	2+5	0	0	0	0	0	0	0	0	0	0	0
97	DF	(Russia) RUS	Yevgeni Yatchenko	10	0	8+2	0	0	0	0	0	0	0	0	0	0	0
98	DF	(Armenia) ARM	Vahagn Ayvazyan	12	2	12	2	0	0	0	0	0	0	0	0	0	0
99	FW	(Russia) RUS	Nikita Tankov	17	2	3+8	2	0	0	0	0	0+4	0	0+2	0	0	0
Players away on loan:
Players who left Alashkert during the season:
1	GK	(Armenia) ARM	David Yurchenko	11	0	6	0	0	0	1	0	2	0	0	0	2	0
4	DF	(Serbia) SRB	Mihailo Jovanović	3	1	3	1	0	0	0	0	0	0	0	0	0	0
8	MF	(Brazil) BRA	Lucas Serra	1	0	0+1	0	0	0	0	0	0	0	0	0	0	0
9	MF	(Armenia) ARM	Rumyan Hovsepyan	25	0	9+3	0	1	0	0	0	3+1	0	4	0	2+2	0
10	FW	(Bosnia and Herzegovina) BIH	Aleksandar Glišić	24	4	6+4	1	1	0	1	0	2+2	1	2+2	1	1+3	1
11	DF	(Armenia) ARM	Aghvan Davoyan	4	0	4	0	0	0	0	0	0	0	0	0	0	0
16	MF	(France) FRA	Vincent Bezecourt	25	1	4+6	0	0+1	0	1	0	0+3	1	0+4	0	4+2	0
33	DF	(Montenegro) MNE	Dejan Boljević	18	1	5	0	1	0	1	0	2	0	4	0	5	1
55	DF	(Russia) RUS	Vladislav Kryuchkov	18	0	9+2	0	0	0	0+1	0	0	0	1	0	4+1	0
77	FW	(Armenia) ARM	Grigor Aghekyan	6	0	0+3	0	0	0	0	0	0+1	0	0+2	0	0	0
85	FW	(Brazil) BRA	Matheus Alessandro	4	0	0+1	0	0	0	0+1	0	0	0	0	0	0+2	0
86	FW	(Brazil) BRA	Nixon	6	0	1+1	0	0	0	0	0	0	0	0	0	0+4	0
94	DF	(Armenia) ARM	Artem Gyurjyan	1	0	0+1	0	0	0	0	0	0	0	0	0	0	0
97	MF	(Russia) RUS	David Davidyan	4	0	0	0	0	0	0	0	4	0	0	0	0	0
98	FW	(Serbia) SRB	Branko Mihajlović	13	0	2+4	0	0	0	1	0	1+1	0	1	0	3	0

=== Goal scorers ===
Place	Position	Nation	Number	Name	Premier League	Armenian Cup	Supercup	UEFA Champions League	UEFA Europa League	UEFA Europa Conference League	Total
1	FW	(Guinea-Bissau)	20	José Embaló	7	0	1	0	2	2	12
2	MF	(Russia)	27	David Khurtsidze	5	0	0	2	0	0	7
3	FW	(Ivory Coast)	15	Béko Fofana	4	0	0	0	0	0	4
3	MF	(Serbia)	10	Marko Milinković	4	0	0	0	0	0	4
3	FW	(Bosnia and Herzegovina)	10	Aleksandar Glišić	1	0	0	1	1	1	4
6	MF	(Armenia)	17	Artak Yedigaryan	3	0	0	0	0	0	3
7	DF	(Armenia)	98	Vahagn Ayvazyan	2	0	0	0	0	0	2
7	FW	(Russia)	99	Nikita Tankov	2	0	0	0	0	0	2
7	MF	(Brazil)	88	James	2	0	0	0	0	0	2
10	DF	(Armenia)	3	Taron Voskanyan	1	0	0	0	0	0	1
10	DF	(Serbia)	4	Mihailo Jovanović	1	0	0	0	0	0	1
10	DF	(Nigeria)	19	Deou Dosa	1	0	0	0	0	0	1
10	MF	(Namibia)	7	Wangu Gome	1	0	0	0	0	0	1
10	DF	(Ivory Coast)	5	Didier Kadio	1	0	0	0	0	0	1
10	MF	(Armenia)	16	Albert Mnatsakanyan	1	0	0	0	0	0	1
10	DF	(Armenia)	94	Karapet Manukyan	1	0	0	0	0	0	1
10	MF	(France)	16	Vincent Bezecourt	0	0	0	1	0	0	1
10	DF	(Montenegro)	33	Dejan Boljević	0	0	0	0	0	1	1
10				Own goal	1	0	0	0	0	0	1
				TOTALS	38	0	1	4	3	4	49

=== Clean sheets ===
Place	Position	Nation	Number	Name	Premier League	Armenian Cup	Supercup	UEFA Champions League	UEFA Europa League	UEFA Europa Conference League	Total
1	GK	(Serbia)	22	Ognjen Čančarević	12	0	0	0	1	0	13
2	GK	(Armenia)	1	David Yurchenko	2	0	1	1	0	0	4
3	GK	(Russia)	25	Artyom Potapov	1	0	0	0	0	0	1
				TOTALS	15	0	1	1	1	0	18

=== Disciplinary record ===
Number	Nation	Position	Name	Premier League		Armenian Cup		Supercup		UEFA Champions League		UEFA Europa League		UEFA Europa Conference League		Total	
Number	Nation	Position	Name	Yellow card	Red card	Yellow card	Red card	Yellow card	Red card	Yellow card	Red card	Yellow card	Red card	Yellow card	Red card	Yellow card	Red card
2	(Brazil)	DF	Tiago Cametá	4	0	1	0	0	0	0	0	0	0	0	0	5	0
3	(Armenia)	DF	Taron Voskanyan	3	0	1	0	0	0	0	0	0	0	3	0	7	0
4	(Russia)	DF	Dmitry Guz	1	0	0	0	0	0	0	0	0	0	0	0	1	0
5	(Ivory Coast)	DF	Didier Kadio	6	0	0	0	0	0	1	0	0	0	1	0	7	0
7	(Namibia)	MF	Wangu Gome	5	1	1	0	1	0	0	0	1	0	0	0	8	1
8	(Armenia)	DF	Gagik Daghbashyan	2	0	0	0	0	0	0	0	0	0	0	0	2	0
10	(Serbia)	MF	Marko Milinković	3	0	0	0	0	0	0	0	0	0	1	0	4	0
15	(Ivory Coast)	FW	Béko Fofana	2	0	0	0	0	0	0	0	0	0	0	0	2	0
17	(Armenia)	MF	Artak Yedigaryan	3	0	0	0	0	0	0	0	0	0	0	0	3	0
19	(Nigeria)	DF	Deou Dosa	2	0	0	0	0	0	0	0	0	0	0	0	2	0
20	(Armenia)	MF	Aghvan Papikyan	1	0	0	0	0	0	0	0	0	0	1	0	2	0
21	(Armenia)	MF	Artak Grigoryan	6	1	0	0	0	0	0	0	2	0	2	1	10	2
22	(Serbia)	GK	Ognjen Čančarević	2	0	0	0	0	0	0	0	1	0	0	0	3	0
25	(Russia)	GK	Artyom Potapov	1	0	0	0	0	0	0	0	0	0	0	0	1	0
27	(Russia)	MF	David Khurtsidze	2	0	0	0	0	0	1	0	0	0	0	0	3	0
55	(Ivory Coast)	MF	Kódjo	1	0	0	0	0	0	0	0	0	0	0	0	1	0
70	(Guinea-Bissau)	FW	José Embaló	6	1	0	0	0	0	0	0	0	0	0	0	6	1
85	(Armenia)	FW	Alexander Ter-Tovmasyan	1	0	0	0	0	0	0	0	0	0	0	0	1	0
88	(Brazil)	MF	James	2	0	0	0	0	0	1	0	3	1	0	0	6	1
95	(Brazil)	MF	Vitinho	1	0	0	0	0	0	0	0	0	0	0	0	1	0
96	(Armenia)	MF	Erik Soghomonyan	1	0	0	0	0	0	0	0	0	0	0	0	1	0
97	(Russia)	DF	Yevgeni Yatchenko	1	0	0	0	0	0	0	0	0	0	0	0	1	0
98	(Armenia)	DF	Vahagn Ayvazyan	2	0	0	0	0	0	0	0	0	0	0	0	2	0
99	(Russia)	FW	Nikita Tankov	1	0	0	0	0	0	1	0	0	0	0	0	2	0
Players away on loan:
Players who left Alashkert during the season:
1	(Armenia)	GK	David Yurchenko	0	0	0	0	1	0	0	0	0	0	0	0	1	0
4	(Serbia)	DF	Mihailo Jovanović	2	0	0	0	0	0	0	0	0	0	0	0	2	0
10	(Bosnia and Herzegovina)	FW	Aleksandar Glišić	5	0	0	0	0	0	1	0	1	0	1	0	8	0
11	(Armenia)	DF	Aghvan Davoyan	1	0	0	0	0	0	0	0	0	0	0	0	1	0
33	(Montenegro)	DF	Dejan Boljević	0	0	0	0	1	0	0	0	2	0	0	0	3	0
55	(Russia)	DF	Vladislav Kryuchkov	2	0	0	0	0	0	0	0	1	0	1	0	4	0
77	(Armenia)	FW	Grigor Aghekyan	0	0	0	0	0	0	1	0	0	0	0	0	1	0
98	(Serbia)	FW	Branko Mihajlović	0	0	0	0	0	0	0	0	0	0	1	0	1	0
			TOTALS	70	3	3	0	3	0	5	0	11	1	11	1	103	5
