= 2021 Armenian Supercup =

Alashkert	Ararat Yerevan
1	0
- Date: 24 September 2021
- Venue: FFA Academy Stadium, Yerevan
- Referee: Ashot Ghaltakchyan
- Attendance: 800

The 2021 Armenian Supercup was the 24th Armenian Supercup, an annual football match played between the winners of the previous season's Premier League, Alashkert, and the previous season's Armenian Cup, Ararat Yerevan, with the former winning 1–0 thanks to a goal from José Embaló.

== Background ==
Alashkert won their fourth League. Ararat Yerevan won their sixth Armenian Cup title after beating Alashkert 3–1 in the final in May 2021.

== Match details ==
24 September 2021
18:30 (UTC+4)

Alashkert	1 – 0	Ararat Yerevan
Embaló 55'	Report

FFA Academy Stadium, Yerevan
Attendance: 800
Referee: Ashot Ghaltakchyan

Alashkert	Ararat Yerevan

GK	1	(Armenia) David Yurchenko	(yellow card) 91'
DF	2	(Brazil) Tiago Cametá
DF	3	(Armenia) Taron Voskanyan
DF	5	(Ivory Coast) Didier Kadio
DF	33	(Montenegro) Dejan Boljević	(yellow card) 13'
MF	16	(France) Vincent Bezecourt		(substituted off) 85'
MF	21	(Armenia) Artak Grigoryan
MF	27	(Russia) David Khurtsidze		(substituted off) 71'
FW	10	(Bosnia and Herzegovina) Aleksandar Glišić		(substituted off) 61'
FW	70	(Portugal) José Embaló		(substituted off) 85'
FW	98	(Serbia) Branko Mihajlović		(substituted off) 21'
Substitutes:
GK	22	(Serbia) Ognjen Čančarević
MF	7	(Namibia) Wangu Gome	(yellow card) 76'	(substituted in) 61'
MF	9	(Armenia) Rumyan Hovsepyan
DF	11	(Armenia) Aghvan Davoyan
FW	15	(Ivory Coast) Béko Fofana		(substituted in) 85'
MF	17	(Armenia) Artak Yedigaryan
MF	20	(Armenia) Aghvan Papikyan
DF	55	(Russia) Vladislav Kryuchkov		(substituted in) 85'
FW	77	(Armenia) Grigor Aghekyan
FW	85	(Brazil) Matheus Alessandro		(substituted in) 21'
MF	95	(Serbia) Marko Milinković		(substituted in) 71'
MF	96	(Armenia) Erik Soghomonyan
Manager:
(Armenia) Aleksandr Grigoryan

GK	1	(Armenia) Poghos Ayvazyan
DF	2	(Armenia) Robert Hakobyan
DF	5	(Armenia) Hrayr Mkoyan	(yellow card) 89'
MF	7	(Nigeria) Isah Aliyu		(substituted off) 68'
FW	9	(Armenia) Razmik Hakobyan		(substituted off) 61'
DF	15	(Armenia) Arsen Sadoyan		(substituted off) 46'
FW	17	(Ivory Coast) Yacouba Silue
MF	20	(Armenia) Rudik Mkrtchyan		(substituted off) 61'
MF	23	(Armenia) Gor Malakyan		(substituted off) 68'
DF	29	(Serbia) Marko Prljević
DF	44	(Colombia) Juan Bravo
Substitutes:
GK	13	(Armenia) Arman Simonyan
GK	45	(Russia) Vsevolod Yermakov
DF	4	(Armenia) Yuri Magakyan
MF	6	(Armenia) Erik Vardanyan
DF	8	(Armenia) Zhirayr Margaryan		(substituted in) 46'
MF	11	(Armenia) David Manoyan		(substituted in) 68'
MF	26	(Armenia) Alik Arakelyan		(substituted in) 61'
MF	27	(Argentina) Iván Díaz		(substituted in) 61'
DF	33	(Armenia) Hovhannes Nazaryan
MF	55	(Serbia) Dimitrije Pobulić		(substituted in) 68'
MF	70	(Ivory Coast) Sosthène Tiehide
FW	80	(Ivory Coast) Amara Traore
Manager:
(Armenia) Vardan Bichakhchyan

Assistant referees:
Mesrop Ghazaryan
Sargis Hovhannisyan
Fourth official:
Yura Mahtesyan

== See also ==
- 2020–21 Armenian Premier League
- 2020–21 Armenian Cup
