= Vincent Bezecourt =

French footballer (born 1993)

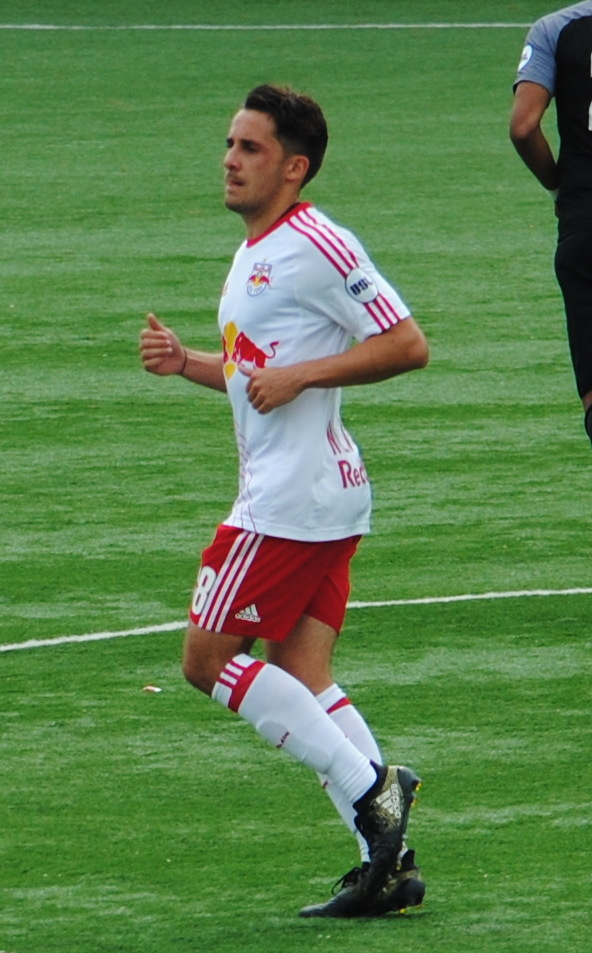
- Bezecourt playing for New York Red Bulls in 2019

Personal information
- Full name: Vincent Bezecourt
- Date of birth: 10 June 1993 (age 33)
- Place of birth: Aire-sur-l'Adour, France
- Height: 5 ft 7 in (1.70 m)
- Position: Midfielder

College career
Years	Team	Apps	(Gls)
2014–2015	St. Francis Brooklyn Terriers	39	(9)

Senior career*
Years	Team	Apps	(Gls)
2012–2014	Jeunesse Villenavaise	52	(9)
2015	Brooklyn Italians		
2016–2019	New York Red Bulls II	54	(16)
2017–2019	New York Red Bulls	21	(0)
2020	Miami FC	15	(1)
2021	Alashkert	36	(2)
2021–2026	Geylang International	102	(31)
- * Club domestic league appearances and goals as of 2 August 2024

Vincent Bezecourt (born 10 June 1993) is a French footballer who last played as an attacking-midfielder for Singapore Premier League club Geylang International. Known for his finishing, set-piece abilities and long-range efforts, he is regarded as one of the most accomplished midfielders to have ever played in the Singapore Premier League.

== Club career ==
=== Early career ===
Bezecourt began his football career in France with Jeunesse Villenavaise and made his debut with the first team during the 2012 season in Championnat de France amateur. In two seasons with the first team, he appeared in 52 league matches scoring 9 goals. In 2014, he went to the United States to play College soccer for St. Francis Brooklyn under head coach Tom Giovatto. In his first year, Bezecourt helped lead St. Francis Brooklyn to an NEC Championship and to an NCAA Tournament appearance. He was also named as a Second Team All-NEC player. In his two seasons with the Terriers, Bezecourt appeared in 39 matches scoring 10 goals and recording 9 assists. Following his senior season he was named a Third Team All-American by the National Soccer Coaches Association of America and a First Team All-NEC player.

=== Brooklyn Italians ===
While at St. Francis, during the 2015 season, Bezecourt played with the Brooklyn Italians of the National Premier Soccer League under head coach Dominic Casciato.

=== New York Red Bulls ===
After graduation from St. Francis College, Bezecourt trained with the New York Red Bulls during the pre-season and subsequently signed a professional contract with the New York Red Bulls II of the United Soccer League on 18 March 2016. On 11 August 2017, it was announced that the New York Red Bulls signed Bezecourt to a Major League Soccer contract. At the time of his signing, he had scored 12 goals and recorded 10 assists in the regular season, along with 2 goals and 4 assists in the 2016 USL playoffs en route to the team's first USL Championship.

==== New York Red Bulls II ====
In his first professional season, Bezecourt appeared in 22 matches, recording 8 goals and 6 assists en route to winning the 2016 USL Championship title as a starting midfielder for the New York Red Bulls II. His 8 goals and 6 assists were second and third most on the team, respectively.

A week after signing on with New York Red Bulls II, Bezecourt featured in his first professional match with the club appearing as a second-half substitute in a 2–2 draw against Toronto FC II. During the second game of the season, Bezecourt suffered a leg injury that sidelined him for 2–3 months. On 2 August 2016 Bezecourt came off the bench to score his first two goals for the New York Red Bulls II in a 5–0 rout over Harrisburg City Islanders. On 7 September 2016, he again scored two goals against the Harrisburg City Islanders, this time to help win the 2016 USL Regular Season Championship for the Red Bulls II. As a result of his performance (2 goals and 1 assist), Bezecourt was named USLSoccer.com 'Man of the Match'. Later that week, he scored another goal in the 89th minute against the Rochester Rhinos to tie the game. Due to both performances Bezecourt was selected to the USL Team of the Week. In the last game of the regular season against the Charleston Battery, Bezecourt scored on a free kick in the 38th minute for his 6th goal of the season. He was also named USLSoccer.com 'Man of the Match' for the second time this season.

During the USL playoffs, Bezecourt scored two goals and recorded four assists, as he helped New York Red Bulls II to win the 2016 USL Championship. On 2 October 2016, Bezecourt scored a goal and assisted on two others to help New York Red Bulls II advance to the Eastern Conference Semi-finals of the 2016 USL Playoffs in a 4–0 victory over Orlando City B. In the two games leading to the USL Championship, Bezecourt recorded three assists and scored on a penalty shoot-out in overtime against Louisville City to help win the game. In the Championship game against the Swope Park Rangers, Bezecourt scored a goal in the 92 minute to put the finishing touch on a 5–1 victory. On 21 November 2016, it was announced that the New York Red Bulls II would exercise their option on the contract of Bezecourt.

==== 2017 season ====
Bezecourt made 24 appearances with the New York Red Bulls II and 3 appearances with the main team; New York Red Bulls. Half-way through the USL season, Bezecourt was given a Major League Soccer contract and was loaned back to New York Red Bulls II. He finished the USL regular season with 6 goals and 11 assists. His 11 assists, led the team and the USL Eastern Conference, and was second overall in the USL. Bezecourt was also tied for leader on the team, in being named to the USL team of the Week three times. At the end of the season, he was named to the 2017 USL All-League Second Team.

On 25 March 2017, Bezecourt helped New York Reb Bulls II to a 3–3 draw with Pittsburgh Riverhounds, scoring two goals in the opening match of the season. Bezecourt went on to be named to the USL Team of the Week three times for weeks 1, 4, and 11. He was also named to the USL Bench Players of the Week, for weeks 2 and 18.

On 12 July 2017, Bezecourt was promoted to the New York Red Bulls for a 13 July match against the New England Revolution as part of the 2017 U.S. Open Cup Quarter-finals match against New England Revolution, Bezecourt was on the senior squad's bench for the match, but did not play featured in the match. He was back in action with New York Red Bulls II for the 15 July match against Charlotte Independence, a losing effort that saw Bezecourt notch his league leading eighth assist of the season. Bezecourt, then scored the only goal in a win against Toronto FC II, snapping a three-game losing streak, before missing two games due to injury.

On 11 August 2017, it was announced that the New York Red Bulls signed Bezecourt to an MLS contract. At the time of the signing, Bezecourt had 19 appearances with New York Red Bulls II, scored six goals and was leading the league with eight assists and 45 chances created. On 18 August 2017, Bezecourt made his first appearance in the 2017 MLS Season with New York Red Bulls as a starting central midfielder against Portland Timbers in a 0–2 losing effort. Bezecourt was then sent back to New York Red Bulls II.

Bezecourt's next appearance withNew York Red Bulls II was against Toronto FC II on 9 September 2017, a 2–1 victory. He made 4 starts, recording 2 assists and against the Pittsburgh Riverhounds on 30 September Bezecourt through a corner kick forced an own goal. The New York Red Bulls II went 2–2 in those games and qualified for the USL Cup, Bezecourt was then sent to the senior squad for his second stint.

On 7 October 2017, Bezecourt came on as a substitution for New York Red Bull iconic player, Bradley Wright-Phillips in the 80th minute against the Vancouver Whitecaps in a 3–0 victory for the New York Red Bulls. It was his second MLS appearance.

On 14 October 2017, Bezecourt started against the Rochester Rhinos in 1–2 losing effort. Bezecourt recorded an assist in the NY Red Bulls II only goal of the game, it was his 11th assist of the year, which tied for second-most in the USL.

On 22 October 2017, Bezecourt made his second MLS start and third appearance in the final game of the season for the New York Red Bulls against D.C. United. Because of the start, Bezecourt did not participate in the Red Bulls II USL cup pursuit. Bezecourt made his first playoff appearance as a substitute for Damien Perrinelle in the 82nd minute against Toronto FC.

==== 2018 season ====
On 22 December 2017, it was announced that Bezecourt was retained by New York Red Bulls. On 10 March 2018, he started in the New York Red Bulls 2018 MLS season opener against Portland Timbers recording two assists in the 4–0 win. On 6 June 2018, Bezecourt opened the scoring in New York's 4–0 derby win over New York City in the fourth round of the 2018 U.S. Open Cup.

=== Miami FC ===
In January 2020, Bezecourt signed with Miami FC of the USL Championship. He make his debut on 8 March against Saint Louis FC. On 1 October, Bezecourt scored his first goal for the club in a 4–3 win over Charleston Battery.

=== Alashkert ===
On 9 March 2021, Bezecourt signed for Armenian Premier League club Alashkert. He make his debut on 17 March in a league match against Shirak SC. Bezecourt scored his first goal for the club in the only goal in the match which secure his team the 3 points against Ararat Yerevan on 25 May. He helped his club to win the 2020–21 Armenian Premier League title in his first season at the club. In the second leg of the 2021–22 UEFA Champions League first qualifying round against Connah's Quay Nomads on 14 July 2021, Bezecourt scored the only goal in the match which put his team in a 3–2 on aggregate sending his team to the second round of the qualifying phase but was knocked out. His club then qualified in the inaugural 2021–22 UEFA Europa Conference League group stage playing their first game on 14 September 2021 where Bezecourt assisted the goal to José Embaló in a 4–1 lost to Maccabi Tel Aviv.

On 24 September 2021, Bezecourt won his second trophy helping his club to win the 2021 Armenian Supercup.

=== Geylang International ===
On 19 December 2021, Bezecourt moved to Southeast Asia to signed for Geylang International of the Singapore Premier League ahead of the 2022 season. On 4 March 2022, he scored on his debut where it is the only goal in the match against Lion City Sailors to secure the 3 points for his club in the league. In his first season at the club, he rake up a total of 10 goals and 11 assists in 30 appearances across all competition played in the 2022 season where he was included in the Singapore Premier League '2022 Team of the Year'.

Bezecourt would go on to have a great start in the second season getting 7 goals and 3 assists in 16 appearance in the league before suffering a cruciate ligament injury against rivals Tampines Rovers on 2 July 2023 which sideline him out for the year.

Bezecourt make his return in the 2024–25 season making his first appearance for the club in over 10 months on 10 May 2024 in a league opener against Balestier Khalsa. On 25 May, he scored and assisted a goal in a 7–1 thrashing win over Young Lions. On 22 June, Bezecourt recorded a hat-trick of assists in a 3–3 draw over DPMM at the Hassanal Bolkiah National Stadium.

Geylang International FC announced his departure on May 10 2026, as he was listed on the Singapore Premier League release list ahead of the 2026-2027 campaign. Since his final SPL match, he has been a free agent without a professional contract.

== International career ==
Before playing at St. Francis College, Bezecourt won a gold medal with France at the 2013 Summer Universiade tournament in Russia.

== Career statistics ==
=== Club ===
As of match played 15 Feb 2026

Appearances and goals by club, season and competition
Club	Season	League			National Cup		Continental		Other		Total	
Club	Season	Division	Apps	Goals	Apps	Goals	Apps	Goals	Apps	Goals	Apps	Goals
New York Red Bulls II	2016	United Soccer League	18	6	-		-		4 (Note: Appearances and goals in the 2016 USL Playoffs)	2	22	8
New York Red Bulls II	2017	United Soccer League	24	6	-		-		-		24	6
New York Red Bulls II	2018	United Soccer League	3	1	-		-		-		3	1
New York Red Bulls II	Total		45	13	-	-	-	-	4	2	49	15
New York Red Bulls	2017	Major League Soccer	3	0	0	0	-		1 (Note: Appearance in the 2017 MLS Cup Playoffs)	0	4	0
New York Red Bulls	2018	Major League Soccer	9	0	1	1	-		-		10	1
New York Red Bulls	2019	Major League Soccer	6	0	-		-		-		6	0
New York Red Bulls	Total		18	0	1	1	-	-	1	0	20	1
Miami FC	2020	USL Championship	15	1	0	0	—		—		15	1
Alashkert	2020–21	Armenian Premier League	8	1	3	0	0 (Note: Appearances in the UEFA Europa League)	0	—		11	1
Alashkert	2021–22	Armenian Premier League	10	0	1	0	13 (Note: Three appearances and one goal in the UEFA Champions League, four appearances in the UEFA Europa League and 6 in the UEFA Europa Conference League)	1	1	0	25	1
Alashkert	Total		18	1	4	0	13	1	1	0	36	2
Geylang International	2022	Singapore Premier League	27	10	3	0	0	0	0	0	30	10
Geylang International	2023	Singapore Premier League	16	7	0	0	0	0	0	0	16	7
Geylang International	2024–25	Singapore Premier League	29	10	2	0	0	0	0	0	31	10
Geylang International	2025–26	Singapore Premier League	20	2	4	2	0	0	0	0	24	4
Geylang International	Total		92	29	9	2	0	0	0	0	101	31
Career total			173	44	14	3	13	1	6	2	216	50

== Honours ==
=== Club ===
New York Red Bulls II

- USL Cup: 2016 USL Cup Champions
- USL: 2016 Regular Season Champions

New York Red Bulls

- MLS Supporters' Shield: 2018

Alashkert

- Armenian Premier League: 2020–21
- Armenian Supercup: 2021

=== Individual ===
- Singapore Premier League Team of the Year: 2022
