= Yatchenko =

Yatchenko (Ukrainian: Я́тченко) is a Ukrainian surname. Notable people with the surname include:

- Dmitri Yatchenko (born 1986), Russian footballer
- Iryna Yatchenko (born 1965), Belarusian discus thrower
- Yevgeni Yatchenko (born 1986), Russian footballer
