= David Yurchenko =

Footballer (born 1986)

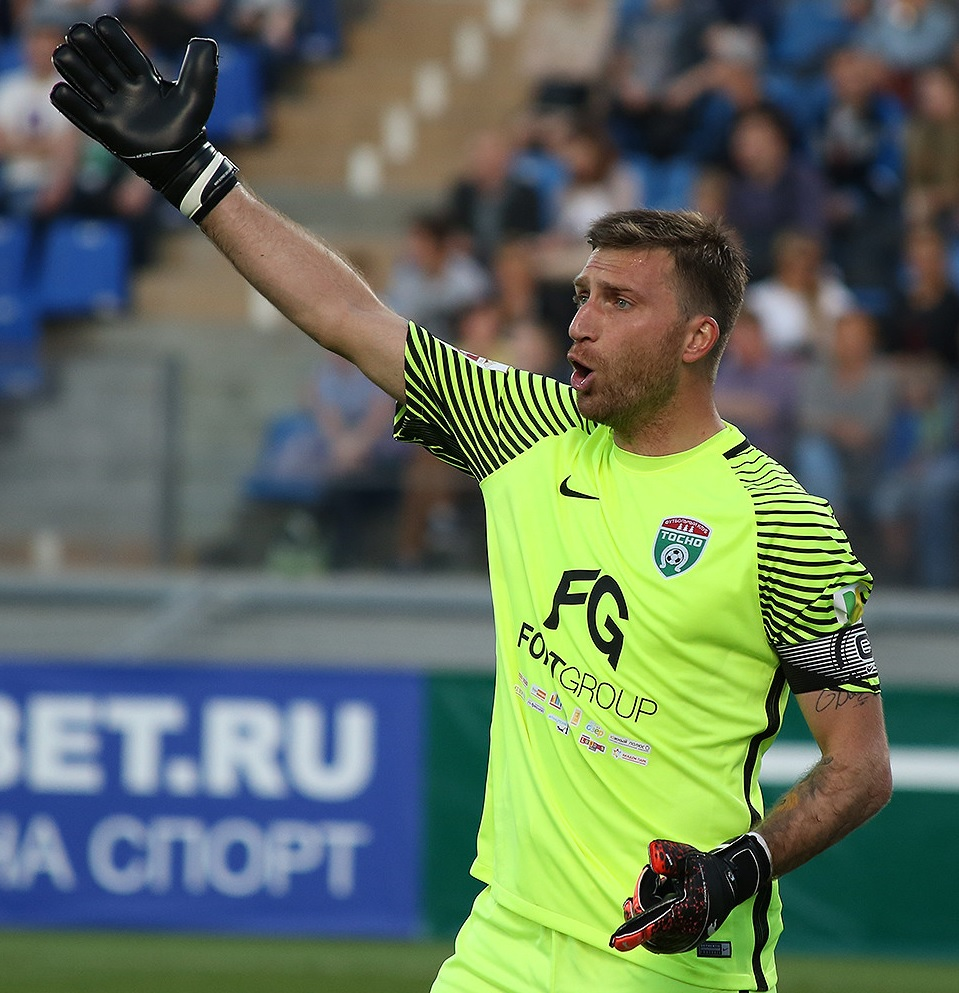
- Yurchenko with Tosno in 2017

Personal information
- Full name: David Viktorovich Yurchenko
- Date of birth: 27 March 1986 (age 40)
- Place of birth: Ashgabat, Turkmen SSR, Soviet Union
- Height: 1.86 m (6 ft 1 in)
- Position: Goalkeeper

Youth career
- 1994–1995: Volga Tver
- 1996: Spartak Moscow
- 1997–2003: Lokomotiv Moscow

Senior career*
Years	Team	Apps	(Gls)
2004	Titan Moscow	5	(0)
2005–2006	Liepājas Metalurgs	0	(0)
2007	Dinamo Minsk	11	(0)
2008–2011	Krylia Sovetov Samara	2	(0)
2010	→ Volgar-Gazprom Astrakhan (loan)	28	(0)
2012–2013	Mordovia Saransk	34	(0)
2013–2016	Ufa	62	(0)
2016	→ Anzhi Makhachkala (loan)	10	(0)
2016–2017	Anzhi Makhachkala	13	(0)
2017–2018	Tosno	28	(0)
2018–2019	Yenisey Krasnoyarsk	17	(0)
2020	Shakhter Karagandy	7	(0)
2021–2022	Alashkert	11	(0)
2022	Pyunik	22	(0)
2023	Telavi	14	(0)
2024	SKA Rostov-on-Don (amateur)		

International career
2020–2022	Armenia	25	(0)
- * Club domestic league appearances and goals

David Viktorovich Yurchenko (Armenian: Դավիթ Յուրչենկո; Russian: Давид Викторович Юрченко; born 27 March 1986) is a former professional footballer who played as a goalkeeper. Born in Turkmenistan, Yurchenko represented the Armenia national football team.

== Club career ==
On 17 June 2017, Yurchenko signed a two-year contract with FC Tosno.

He played as Tosno won the 2017–18 Russian Cup final against FC Avangard Kursk on 9 May 2018 in the Volgograd Arena.

On 18 June 2018, Yurchenko signed with FC Yenisey Krasnoyarsk.

On 22 January 2020, Yurchenko signed for Kazakhstan Premier League club Shakhter Karagandy.

On 14 January 2021, Yurchenko signed for Armenian Premier League club Alashkert.

On 1 February 2022, Pyunik announced the signing of Yurchenko. On 24 December 2022, Pyunik announced that Yurchenko had left the club.

== International career ==
Yurchenko was born in Turkmenistan and raised in Russia, and is of Armenian descent through his mother - he was eligible for all three national teams. He debuted with the Armenia national football team in a 2-1 UEFA Nations League loss to North Macedonia on 5 September 2020.

== Career statistics ==
=== Club ===
As of match played 13 November 2022

Appearances and goals by club, season and competition
Club	Season	League			Cup		Continental		Other		Total	
Club	Season	Division	Apps	Goals	Apps	Goals	Apps	Goals	Apps	Goals	Apps	Goals
Titan Moscow	2004	PFL	5	0	1	0	–		–		6	0
Liepājas Metalurgs	2005	Latvian Higher League	0	0	0	0	0 (Note: Appearances in the UEFA Cup)	0	–		0	0
Liepājas Metalurgs	2005	Latvian Higher League	0	0	0	0	–		–		0	0
Liepājas Metalurgs	Total		0	0	0	0	0	0	0	0	0	0
Dinamo Minsk	2007	Belarusian Premier League	11	0	0	0	0	0	–		11	0
Krylia Sovetov Samara	2008	Russian Premier League	0	0	1	0	–		–		1	0
Krylia Sovetov Samara	2009	Russian Premier League	0	0	0	0	0 (Note: Appearances in the UEFA Europa League)	0	–		0	0
Krylia Sovetov Samara	2010	Russian Premier League	2	0	–		–		–		2	0
Krylia Sovetov Samara	2011–12	Russian Premier League	0	0	1	0	–		–		1	0
Krylia Sovetov Samara	Total		2	0	2	0	0	0	0	0	4	0
Volgar-Gazprom Astrakhan (loan)	2010	FNL	28	0	1	0	–		–		29	0
Mordovia Saransk	2011–12	FNL	13	0	–		–		–		13	0
Mordovia Saransk	2012–13	Russian Premier League	21	0	0	0	–		–		21	0
Mordovia Saransk	Total		34	0	0	0	0	0	0	0	34	0
Ufa	2013–14	FNL	25	0	0	0	–		2 (Note: Two appearances in promotion play-offs)	0	27	0
Ufa	2014–15	Russian Premier League	25	0	0	0	–		–		25	0
Ufa	2015–16	Russian Premier League	12	0	0	0	–		–		12	0
Ufa	Total		62	0	0	0	0	0	2	0	64	0
Anzhi Makhachkala (loan)	2015–16	Russian Premier League	10	0	–		–		2 (Note: Two appearances in relegation play-offs)	0	12	0
Anzhi Makhachkala	2016–17	Russian Premier League	13	0	3	0	–		–		16	0
Tosno	2017–18	Russian Premier League	28	0	3	0	–		–		31	0
Yenisey Krasnoyarsk	2018–19	Russian Premier League	17	0	1	0	–		–		18	0
Shakhter Karagandy	2020	Kazakhstan Premier League	7	0	0	0	–		–		7	0
Alashkert	2020–21	Armenian Premier League	5	0	3	0	0	0	–		8	0
Alashkert	2021–22	Armenian Premier League	6	0	0	0	4 (Note: Two appearances in the UEFA Champions League, zero appearances in the UEFA Europa League, two appearances in the UEFA Europa Conference League)	0	1 (Note: Appearances in the Armenian Supercup)	0	11	0
Alashkert	Total		11	0	3	0	4	0	1	0	18	0
Pyunik	2021–22	Armenian Premier League	16	0	0	0	–		–		16	0
Pyunik	2022–23	Armenian Premier League	6	0	0	0	13 (Note: Five appearances in the UEFA Champions League, two appearances in the UEFA Europa League, six appearances in the UEFA Europa Conference League)	0	–		19	0
Pyunik	Total		22	0	0	0	13	0	0	0	35	0
Career total			250	0	14	0	17	0	5	0	286	0

=== International ===
As of match played on 27 September 2022

Appearances and goals by national team and year
National team	Year	Apps	Goals
Armenia	2020	6	0
Armenia	2021	11	0
Armenia	2022	8	0
Total		25	0

== Honours ==
Tosno

- Russian Cup: 2017–18

Alashkert

- Armenian Premier League: 2020–21
- Armenian Supercup: 2021

Pyunik

- Armenian Premier League: 2021–22
