= Aleksandar Glišić =

Aleksandar Glišić may refer to:

- Aleksandar Glišić (footballer) (born 1992), Bosnian footballer
- Aleksandar Glišić (soldier) (1873–1912), lieutenant colonel of the Serbian army
- Aleksandar Glišić (basketball) (born 1968), Serbian basketball coach (Beopetrol, Leotar Trebinje, Vizura) and former player (Partizan, IMT, Beopetrol)
- Aleksandar Glišić, Serbian basketball referee (2019 FIBA Basketball World Cup, 2020 Summer Olympics)
