= 2020–21 Armenian Premier League =

Armenian Premier League
- Season: 2020–21
- Dates: 14 August 2020 - 27 May 2021
- Champions: Alashkert
- Champions League: Alashkert
- Europa Conference League: Ararat; Noah; Urartu
- Matches: 88
- Goals: 190 (2.16 per match)
- Top goalscorer: Jonel Désiré; Yusuf Otubanjo (8 goals each)
- Biggest home win: Ararat-Armenia 7–0 Shirak (17 October 2020)
- Biggest away win: Urartu 0–3 Noah (22 September 2020); Shirak 0–3 Ararat (26 September 2020); Shirak 0–3 Urartu (22 November 2020); Van 0–3 Pyunik (14 April 2021)
- Highest scoring: Ararat-Armenia 7–0 Shirak (17 October 2020)
- Longest winning run: 4 matches Alashkert
- Longest unbeaten run: 10 matches Ararat
- Longest winless run: 10 matches Shirak
- Longest losing run: 5 matches Shirak
- All statistics correct as of 4 May 2021.

The 2020–21 Armenian Premier League season is the 29th since its establishment.

== Season events ==
On 30 July, it was announced that FC Van had been giving a license to compete in the Armenian Premier League, with the season commencing on 14 August 2020.

On 29 September, the season was suspended indefinitely due to the escalating 2020 Nagorno-Karabakh war. On 13 October, the FFA announced that the season would resume on 17 October.

On 3 November, Gandzasar Kapan announced that they were withdrawing from the League and Armenian Cup due to the ongoing financial constraints relating to the ongoing COVID-19 pandemic in Armenia and the 2020 Nagorno-Karabakh war.

On 16 March, Lori walked off at the start of their match against Ararat Yerevan in protest of their Matchday 1 fixture being awarded to Urartu after Lori where unable to field a team due to COVID-19. Lori later submitted their resignation from the Premier League on 5 April.

== Teams ==
Locations of the 2020–21 Armenian Premier League teams

Club	Location	Stadium	Capacity
Alashkert	Yerevan (Shengavit)	Alashkert Stadium	6,850
Ararat	Yerevan (Kentron)	Vazgen Sargsyan Republican Stadium	14,403
Ararat-Armenia	Yerevan (Avan)	Yerevan Football Academy Stadium	1,428
Gandzasar	Yerevan (Avan)	Yerevan Football Academy Stadium^{1}	1,428
Lori	Vanadzor	Vanadzor Football Academy^{2}	880
Noah	Yerevan (Shengavit)	Alashkert Stadium^{3}	6,850
Pyunik	Yerevan (Kentron)	Vazgen Sargsyan Republican Stadium	14,403
Shirak	Gyumri	Gyumri City Stadium	4,000
Urartu^{5}	Yerevan (Malatia-Sebastia)	Urartu Stadium	4,860
Van	Charentsavan	Charentsavan City Stadium	5,000

- ^{1}Gandzasar played their home games at the Yerevan Football Academy Stadium in Yerevan, due to the rebuilding of their regular venue Gandzasar Stadium, Kapan.
- ^{2}Lori played at the main training pitch of the Vanadzor Football Academy due to the rebuilding of their regular venue Vanadzor City Stadium, Vanadzor.
- ^{3}Noah played at the Alashkert Stadium, Yerevan, instead of their regular venue Mika Stadium, Yerevan.

=== Personnel and sponsorship ===
Team	Manager	Captain	Kit manufacturer	Shirt sponsor
Alashkert	(Armenia) Abraham Khashmanyan	(Armenia) Artak Grigoryan	(Spain) Joma	Bagratour, Huawei
Ararat	(Armenia) Vardan Bichakhchyan		(United States) Nike	AWI International
Ararat-Armenia	(Spain) David Campaña		(Spain) Joma	Tashir Group
Gandzasar	(Armenia) Armen Petrosyan	(Armenia) Gevorg Nranyan	(Germany) Adidas	ZCMC
Lori	(Israel) Albert Solomonov		(Germany) Puma	TotoGaming
Noah	(Russia) Dmitri Gunko		(Germany) Adidas	
Pyunik	(Armenia) Artak Oseyan		(Spain) Joma	TotoGaming
Shirak		(Armenia) Aghvan Davoyan	(Switzerland) Fourteen	Mogo
Urartu	(Armenia) Aleksandr Grigoryan		(Germany) Jako	
Van	(Russia) Konstantin Zaytsev		(Italy) Legea	

=== Managerial changes ===
Team	Outgoing manager	Manner of departure	Date of vacancy	Position in table	Incoming manager	Date of appointment
Ararat Yerevan	(Russia) Igor Kolyvanov	Contract expired		Pre-season	(Armenia) Vardan Bichakhchyan	23 July 2020
Shirak	(Armenia) Vardan Bichakhchyan			Pre-season		
Noah	(Moldova) Vadim Boreț		5 November 2020	Pre-season	(Russia) Dmitri Gunko	5 November 2020
Pyunik	(Armenia) Roman Berezovsky	Mutual consent	13 July 2020	Pre-season	(Armenia) Artak Oseyan	20 July 2020
Ararat-Armenia	(Armenia) Vardan Minasyan	Contract expired	17 July 2020	Pre-season	(Spain) David Campaña	22 July 2020
Van	(Armenia) Karen Barseghyan	To vice president	31 July 2020	Pre-season	(Armenia) Sevada Arzumanyan	31 July 2020
Lori	(Armenia) Armen Sanamyan (Caretaker)	Signed by Sevan	4 August 2020	Pre-season	(Israel) Albert Solomonov	5 August 2020
Pyunik	(Armenia) Artak Oseyan	Mutual termination	13 December 2020	9th	(Armenia) Yegishe Melikyan	7 January 2021
Alashkert	(Armenia) Yegishe Melikyan	Mutual termination	5 January 2021	3rd	(Armenia) Abraham Khashmanyan	7 January 2021
Van	(Armenia) Sevada Arzumanyan		2 February 2021	7th	(Russia) Konstantin Zaytsev	2 February 2021
Ararat-Armenia	(Spain) David Campaña	Mutual Consent	5 March 2021	4th	(Armenia) Armen Adamyan	5 March 2021
Urartu	(Armenia) Aleksandr Grigoryan	Mutual termination	9 March 2021	6th	(Armenia) Tigran Yesayan (Caretaker)	9 March
Alashkert	(Armenia) Abraham Khashmanyan	Mutual termination	20 May 2021	4th	(Armenia) Aleksandr Grigoryan	20 May 2021

== League table ==
Pos	Team	Pld	W	D	L	GF	GA	GD	Pts	Qualification or relegation
1	Alashkert (C)	24	13	7	4	25	15	+10	46	Qualification for the Champions League first qualifying round
2	Noah	24	12	5	7	35	20	+15	41	Qualification for the Europa Conference League first qualifying round
3	Urartu	24	12	5	7	28	19	+9	41	Qualification for the Europa Conference League first qualifying round
4	Ararat (Note: Ararat qualified for Europa Conference League first qualifying round as winners of 2020–21 Armenian Cup.)	24	11	7	6	34	18	+16	40	Qualification for the Europa Conference League first qualifying round
5	Ararat-Armenia	24	10	8	6	32	17	+15	38	
6	Van	24	9	4	11	25	30	−5	31	
7	Pyunik	24	6	7	11	20	18	+2	25	
8	Lori (Note: Round 19–27 matches involving Lori were all declared 3–0 forfeits in favor of the remaining 8 teams.)	24	7	2	15	16	44	−28	23	
9	Shirak (R)	24	2	7	15	19	53	−34	13	Relegation to First League
10	Gandzasar (R, D)	0	0	0	0	0	0	0	0	Club disqualified (Note: Gandzasar were excluded from the league On 3 November, Gandzasar Kapan announced that they were withdrawing from the League and Armenian Cup due to the ongoing financial constraints relating to the ongoing COVID-19 pandemic in Armenia and the 2020 Nagorno-Karabakh conflict.)

Source: FFA Soccerway
Rules for classification: 1) Points; 2) Play-off (only if deciding champion); 3) Matches won; 4) Head-to-head points; 5) Head-to-head matches won; 6) Head-to-head goal difference; 7) Head-to-head goals scored; 8) Head-to-head away goals scored; 9) Goal difference; 10) Goals scored.
(C) Champions; (D) Disqualified; (R) Relegated

== Fixtures and results ==
=== Round 1–18 ===
Home \ Away	ALA	ARA	AAR	LOR	NOA	PYU	SHI	URA	VAN
Alashkert	—	1–2	0–0	2–1	1–0	0–0	0–0	1–2	2–1
Ararat	0–1	—	1–0	3–0	1–1	1–0	4–0	2–0	1–1
Ararat-Armenia	1–2	0–0	—	1–2	3–1	2–1	7–0	0–1	3–0
Lori	0–1	1–0	0–1	—	2–0	1–0	3–2	1–1	0–1
Noah	1–2	2–1	0–0	3–1	—	0–1	2–2	1–1	4–0
Pyunik	1–1	1–1	0–1	1–1	0–1	—	0–2	0–0	0–0
Shirak	1–1	0–3	2–2	0–1	0–3	0–2	—	0–3	0–0
Urartu	1–2	2–0	1–2	3–0	0–3	0–1	1–0	—	2–0
Van	0–1	0–1	0–1	1–2	0–1	1–0	3–1	3–1	—

Source: Soccerway
Legend: Blue = home team win; Yellow = draw; Red = away team win.

=== Round 19–27 ===
Home \ Away	ALA	ARA	AAR	LOR	NOA	PYU	SHI	URA	VAN
Alashkert			1–0	3–0		1–0		1–0	
Ararat	0–0			3–0	2–3		5–2		
Ararat-Armenia		1–1			0–0		2–1		2–3
Lori			0–3		0–3		0–3	0–3	
Noah	1–0					1–0	3–0		1–2
Pyunik		1–2	0–0	3–0				0–1	
Shirak	0–0					1–5		1–1	1–2
Urartu		1–0	0–0		1–0				2–1
Van	3–1	1–1		3–0		0–3			

Source: Soccerway
Legend: Blue = home team win; Yellow = draw; Red = away team win.

== Season statistics ==
=== Scoring ===
- First goal of the season: Wilfried Eza for Van against Gandzasar Kapan (15 August 2020)

==== Top scorers ====
As of match(es) played 4 May 2021

Rank	Player	Club	Goals
1	(Haiti) Jonel Désiré	Urartu	8
1	(Nigeria) Yusuf Otubanjo	Ararat-Armenia	8
3	(Serbia) Uroš Nenadović	Ararat Yerevan	7
4	(Russia) Vladimir Azarov	Noah	6
4	(Ivory Coast) Wilfried Eza	Van	6
4	(Ivory Coast) Mory Kone	Ararat Yerevan	6
7	(Russia) David Davidyan	Alashkert	5
8	(Armenia) Wbeymar	Ararat-Armenia	4
8	(Cape Verde) Mailson Lima	Ararat-Armenia	4
10	(Brazil) Claudir	Lori	3
10	(Bosnia and Herzegovina) Aleksandar Glišić	Alashkert	3
10	(Armenia) Aleksandre Karapetian	Ararat-Armenia	3
10	(Russia) Pavel Kireyenko	Noah	3
10	(Lithuania) Rokas Krusnauskas	Gandzasar	3
10	(Armenia) Edgar Movsesyan	Van	3
10	(Portugal) Alex Oliveira	Noah	3
10	(Armenia) Artem Simonyan	Noah	3
10	(Serbia) Igor Stanojević	Shirak	3

=== Clean sheets ===
As of match played 5 March 2021

Rank	Player	Club	Clean sheets
1	(Russia) Vsevolod Yermakov	Ararat Yerevan	8
2	(Italy) Valerio Vimercati	Noah	5
3	(Serbia) Ognjen Čančarević	Alashkert	4
3	(Serbia) Stefan Čupić	Ararat-Armenia	4
3	(Armenia) Arsen Beglaryan	Urartu	4
3	(Russia) Samur Agamagomedov	Van	4
7	(Russia) Dmitry Abakumov	Ararat-Armenia	3
7	(Russia) Stanislav Buchnev	Pyunik	3
9	(Armenia) Henri Avagyan	Van	2
10	(Belarus) Artem Gomelko	Lori	1
10	(Armenia) Anatoliy Ayvazov	Urartu	1
10	(Montenegro) Nemanja Šćekić	Lori	1
10	(Ukraine) Herman Penkov	Pyunik	1
10	(Armenia) Gevorg Kasparov	Shirak	1
10	(Serbia) Spasoje Stefanović	Shirak	1
