= Ognjen Čančarević =

Armenian footballer

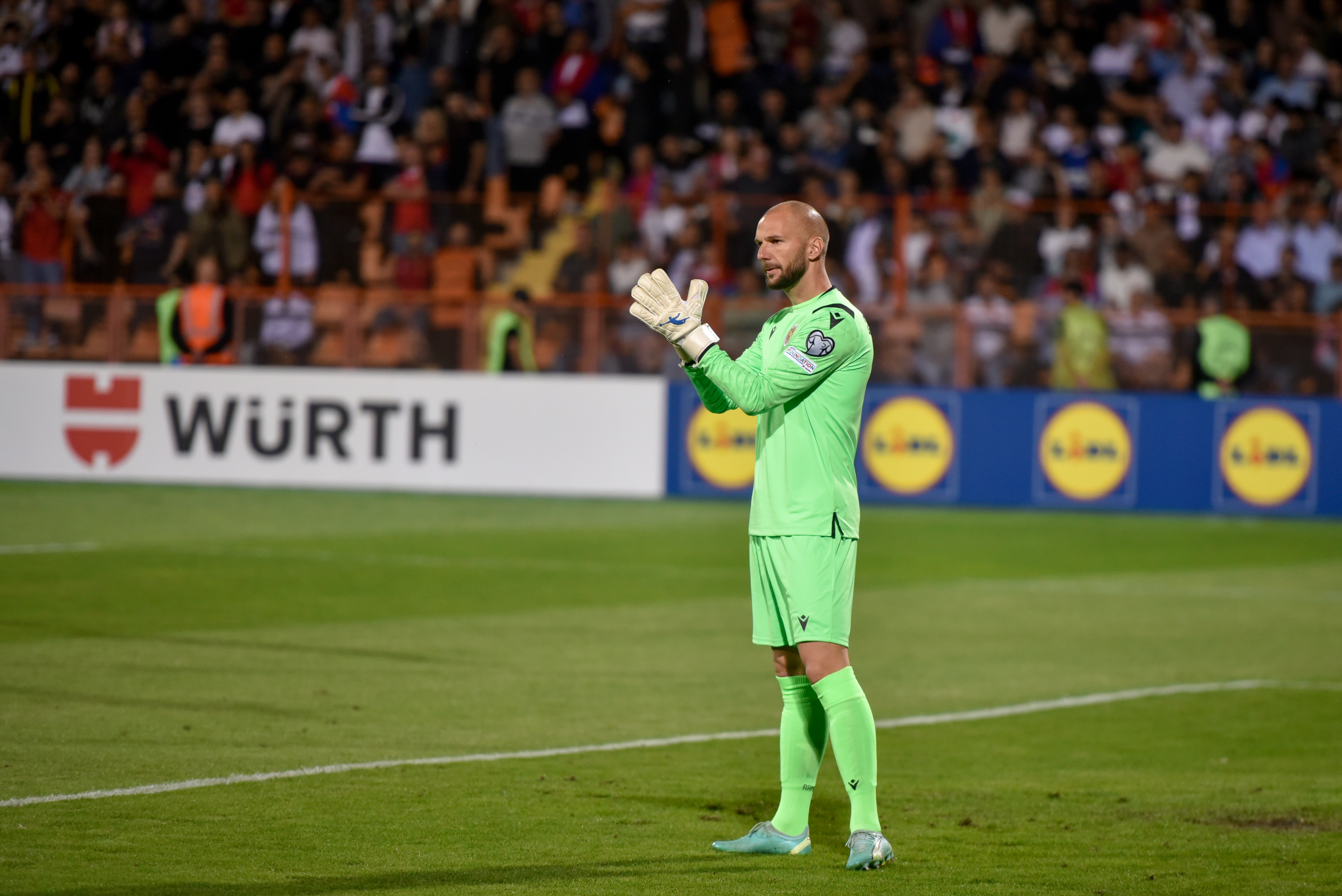
- Čančarević in 2023

Personal information
- Date of birth: 25 September 1989 (age 37)
- Place of birth: Titovo Užice, SR Serbia, Yugoslavia
- Height: 1.88 m (6 ft 2 in)
- Position: Goalkeeper

Team information
- Current team: IMT
- Number: 55

Youth career
- Sloboda Užice

Senior career*
Years	Team	Apps	(Gls)
2006–2007	Sloboda Užice	1	(0)
2006	→ Zlatibor Užice (loan)		
2007–2008	Sloga Bajina Bašta	24	(0)
2008–2009	Sevojno	1	(0)
2009	→ Sloboda Užice (loan)	14	(0)
2009–2014	Radnički Kragujevac	122	(0)
2014	Sloboda Užice	15	(0)
2015	OFK Beograd	3	(0)
2016	Mladost Lučani	2	(0)
2016–2018	Radnik Surdulica	57	(0)
2018–2024	Alashkert	159	(0)
2024–2026	Noah	39	(1)
2026–	IMT	17	(0)

International career^{‡}
2023–	Armenia	23	(0)
- * Club domestic league appearances and goals as of 13 June 2026 ‡ National team caps and goals as of 28 September 2026

Ognjen Čančarević (Armenian: Օգնյեն Չանչարևիչ; Serbian Cyrillic: Огњен Чанчаревић; born 25 September 1989) is a professional footballer who plays as a goalkeeper for Serbian Superliga club IMT. Born in Serbia, he plays for the Armenia national team.

== Club career ==
Čančarević initially played with Sloboda Užice, FK Zlatibor Užice, FK Sloga Bajina Bašta and FK Sevojno. He joined Radnički in summer 2009 and after playing two seasons in the Serbian First League they won promotion to the SuperLiga in 2011. In 2018, he became an Alashkert player.

On 15 January 2024, Noah announced the signing of Čančarević following his release from Alashkert on 11 January 2024. On 6 August 2024, he scored as a goalkeeper against AEK Athens in the third qualifying round of 2024–25 UEFA Conference League. On 10 June 2025, Noah announced that they had extended their contract with Čančarević.

== International career ==
Čančarević was called up to the Serbia national team for a friendly match against the United States on 29 January 2017. He remained on the bench with the match ending 0–0.

After five years of living in Armenia, he received Armenian citizenship. In June 2023 he was called up to join the Armenia national team, making his debut against Wales on 16 June 2023.

== Personal life ==
His father Milan was also a professional footballer and so is his cousin Luka.

== Career statistics ==
=== Club ===
As of match played 27 May 2025

Appearances and goals by club, season and competition
Club	Season	League			National Cup		Continental		Other		Total	
Club	Season	Division	Apps	Goals	Apps	Goals	Apps	Goals	Apps	Goals	Apps	Goals
Alashkert	2017–18	Armenian Premier League	13	0	2	0	0 (Note: Appearances in the UEFA Champions League)	0	0 (Note: Appearances in the Armenian Supercup)	0	15	0
Alashkert	2018–19	Armenian Premier League	27	0	3	0	6 (Note: Two appearances in the UEFA Champions League and four appearances in the UEFA Europa League)	0	0	0	36	0
Alashkert	2019–20	Armenian Premier League	25	0	1	0	4 (Note: Appearances in the UEFA Europa League)	0	0	0	30	0
Alashkert	2020–21	Armenian Premier League	18	0	3	0	1	0	—		22	0
Alashkert	2021–22	Armenian Premier League	25	0	1	0	10 (Note: Two appearances in the UEFA Champions League, four appearances in the UEFA Europa League and four appearances in the UEFA Europa Conference League)	0	0	0	36	0
Alashkert	2022–23	Armenian Premier League	33	0	1	0	2 (Note: Appearances and goals in the UEFA Europa Conference League)	0	—		36	0
Alashkert	2023–24	Armenian Premier League	18	0	0	0	4	0	—		22	0
Alashkert	Total		159	0	11	0	27	0	0	0	197	0
Noah	2023–24	Armenian Premier League	15	0	0	0	—		—		15	0
Noah	2024–25	Armenian Premier League	16	0	3	0	10	1	—		29	1
Noah	Total		31	0	3	0	10	1	0	0	44	1
Career total			190	0	14	0	37	1	0	0	241	1

=== International ===
As of match played 28 September 2026

Armenia
Year	Apps	Goals
2023	8	0
2024	9	0
2025	3	0
2026	3	0
Total	23	0

== Honours ==
Alashkert

- Armenian Premier League: 2017–18, 2020–21
- Armenian Cup: 2018–19
- Armenian Supercup: 2021

Noah

- Armenian Premier League: 2024–25
- Armenian Cup: 2024–25
