= Marko Milinković =

Serbian footballer

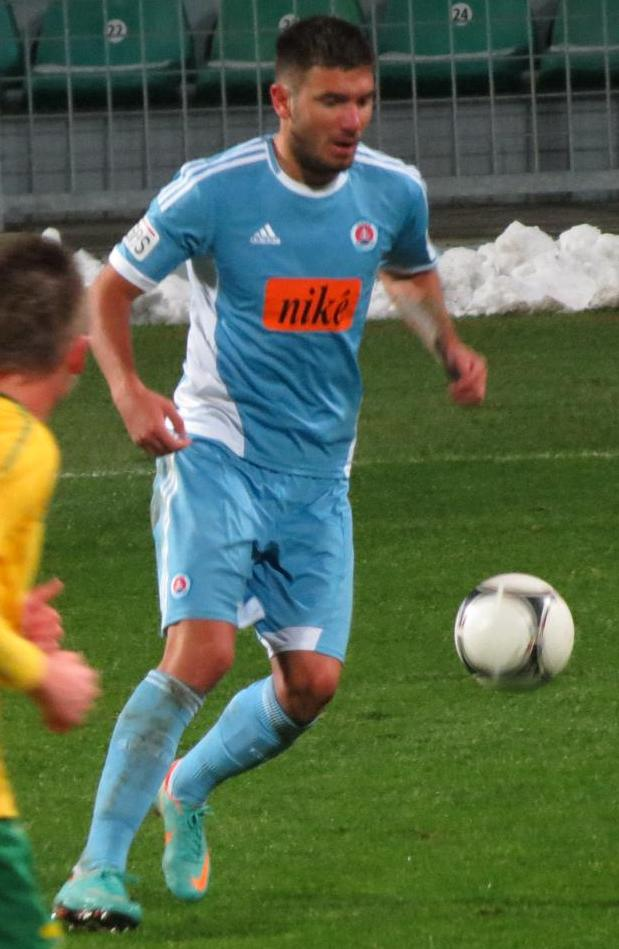
- Milinković in 2012

Personal information
- Full name: Marko Milinković
- Date of birth: 16 April 1988 (age 38)
- Place of birth: Belgrade, SFR Yugoslavia
- Height: 1.81 m (5 ft 11 in)
- Position: Left midfielder

Youth career
- Borac Čačak

Senior career*
Years	Team	Apps	(Gls)
2007–2010	Košice	86	(19)
2011–2016	Slovan Bratislava	143	(34)
2016–2018	Gençlerbirliği	26	(1)
2018–2019	Eskişehirspor	27	(5)
2020–2021	Giresunspor	26	(0)
2021–2022	Alashkert	22	(4)
2022–2023	Metalac Gornji Milanovac	35	(6)
2024	Borac 1926		

International career^{‡}
2008–2010	Serbia U21	14	(3)
2009	Serbia	1	(0)
- * Club domestic league appearances and goals as of 26 December 2023 ‡ National team caps and goals as of 13 August 2009

Marko Milinković (Serbian Cyrillic: Марко Милинковић; born 16 April 1988) is a Serbian footballer who plays as a midfielder.

== Career ==
From July 2007 until December 2010, he played for Košice. In February 2011, Milinković signed a contract with Slovan Bratislava. In May 2016 he signed with Gençlerbirliği S.K.

On 3 September 2021, Alashkert announced the signing of Milinković.

== International ==
Milinković was a member of the Serbia national under-21 football team. He debuted against Denmark at the Play-off for Final Tournament 2009 Euro U-21 Championship on 11 October 2008. In second leg against Denmark he scored his first goal. Milinković played first half against Belarus at the 2009 Euro U-21 Championship. On 12 August 2009, Marko made his senior international debut in a 3–1 away win against South Africa in a friendly.

== Personal life ==
His father Duško Milinković was also a footballer, playing for Yugoslavia at the 1988 Summer Olympics.

== Career statistics ==
=== Club ===
As of match played 22 May 2022

Appearances and goals by club, season and competition
Club	Season	League			National cup (Note: Includes Slovak Cup, Turkish Cup, Armenian Cup)		Continental		Other		Total	
Club	Season	Division	Apps	Goals	Apps	Goals	Apps	Goals	Apps	Goals	Apps	Goals
MFK Košice	2007–08	Slovak Super Liga	21	1	3	0	—		—		24	1
MFK Košice	2008–09	Slovak Super Liga	27	8	6	2	—		—		33	10
MFK Košice	2009–10	Slovak Super Liga	27	5	4	0	4	1	—		35	6
MFK Košice	2010–11	Slovak Super Liga	11	5	0	0	—		—		11	5
MFK Košice	Total		86	19	13	2	4	1	—		103	22
Slovan Bratislava	2010–11	Slovak Super Liga	12	3	3	1	0 (Note: Appearances and goals in the UEFA Europa League)	0	—		15	2
Slovan Bratislava	2011–12	Slovak Super Liga	29	5	3	1	10 (Note: Six appearances and zero goals in the UEFA Champions League and four appearances and zero goals the UEFA Europa League)	0	—		42	6
Slovan Bratislava	2012–13	Slovak Super Liga	28	5	5	3	2	0	—		24	1
Slovan Bratislava	2013–14	Slovak Super Liga	24	6	5	1	2 (Note: Appearances and goals in the UEFA Champions League)	0	—		24	1
Slovan Bratislava	2014–15	Slovak Super Liga	24	8	3	0	10 (Note: Five appearances and two goals in the UEFA Champions League, five appearances and zero goals in the UEFA Europa League)	2	1 (Note: Appearance and goal in the Slovak Super Cup)	1	24	1
Slovan Bratislava	2015–16	Slovak Super Liga	26	7	5	0	6	1	—		24	1
Slovan Bratislava	Total		143	34	24	6	30	3	1	1	198	44
Gençlerbirliği	2016–17	Süper Lig	11	0	5	3	—		—		16	3
Gençlerbirliği	2017–18	Süper Lig	15	1	3	0	—		—		18	1
Gençlerbirliği	Total		26	1	8	3	—		—		34	4
Eskişehirspor	2018–19	TFF 1. Lig	14	1	0	0	—		—		14	1
Eskişehirspor	2019–20	TFF 1. Lig	13	4	0	0	—		—		13	4
Eskişehirspor	Total		27	5	0	0	—		—		27	5
Giresunspor	2019–20	TFF 1. Lig	11	0	0	0	—		—		11	0
Giresunspor	2020–21	TFF 1. Lig	15	0	2	1	—		—		17	1
Giresunspor	Total		26	0	2	1	—		—		28	1
Alashkert	2021–22	Armenian Premier League	22	4	1	0	5 (Note: Zero appearances and goals in the UEFA Champions League, zero appearances and goals in the UEFA Europa League, five appearances and zero goals in the UEFA Europa Conference League)	0	1 (Note: Appearances and goals in the Armenian Supercup)	0	29	4
Career total			330	63	48	12	39	4	2	1	419	80

=== International ===
As of match played 12 August 2009

National team	Year	Apps	Goals
Serbia
Serbia	2009	1	0
Total		1	0

== Honours ==
Košice

- Slovak Cup: 2008–09

Slovan

- Fortuna Liga: 2010–11, 2012–13, 2013–14
- Slovak Cup: 2010–11, 2012–13
- Slovak Super Cup: 2014

Alashkert

- Armenian Supercup: 2021
