= Vosketas =

Vosketas Ոսկեթաս
- Location within Armenia Location within Aragatsotn
- Coordinates: 40°27′N 43°57′E
- Country: Armenia
- Province: Aragatsotn
- Municipality: Talin
- Elevation: 2,050 m (6,730 ft)

Population (2011)
  - Total: 533
- Time zone: UTC+4
  - Summer (DST): UTC+5

Vosketas (Armenian: Ոսկեթաս is a village in the Talin Municipality of the Aragatsotn Province of Armenia.

== Notable people ==
- Manvel Agaronyan, football player
