= José Embaló =

Bissau-Guinean footballer

Personal information
- Full name: José Alberto Djaló Embaló
- Date of birth: 3 May 1993 (age 33)
- Place of birth: Funchal, Portugal
- Height: 1.88 m (6 ft 2 in)
- Position: Forward

Youth career
- CD Belas
- –2008: UDR Algés
- 2008–2012: Casa Pia

Senior career*
| Years | Team | Apps | (Gls) |
| 2012–2014 | AEL Limassol | 9 | (1) |
| 2014–2015 | Beira-Mar | 5 | (0) |
| 2015–2016 | Rapid București | 10 | (2) |
| 2016 | Fjarðabyggð | 14 | (4) |
| 2016–2017 | Ayia Napa | 26 | (11) |
| 2017–2018 | Raków Częstochowa | 25 | (5) |
| 2018–2019 | Casa Pia | 29 | (5) |
| 2019–2020 | Puszcza Niepołomice | 19 | (6) |
| 2020–2021 | Olimpia Grudziądz | 40 | (16) |
| 2021 | Alashkert | 28 | (7) |
| 2022–2023 | Sabah | 7 | (1) |
| 2023 | Nejmeh | 10 | (6) |
| 2024 | Dalian Young Boy | 4 | (0) |
| 2024 | Alashkert | 12 | (2) |

International career
| 2022 | Guinea-Bissau | 3 | (2) |
- * Club domestic league appearances and goals as of 3 March 2025

José Alberto Djaló Embaló (born 3 May 1993) is a footballer who plays as a forward, most recently for Armenian side Alashkert. Born in Portugal, he plays for the Guinea-Bissau national team.

Besides Portugal, he has played in Cyprus, Romania, Iceland, Poland, Armenia, Malaysia and Lebanon.

== Club career ==
On 27 January 2013, Embaló made his professional debut with AEL Limassol in the Cypriot First Division match against Nea Salamis replacing Orlando Sá (60th minute).

In July 2023, he joined Nejmeh in the Lebanese Premier League.

On 25 February 2024, Embaló joined China League One club Dalian Young Boy.

== International career ==
Embaló made his debut for Guinea-Bissau national team on 23 March 2022 against Equatorial Guinea, scoring two goals in their 3–0 victory.

== Personal life ==
Embaló is the cousin of the Portuguese footballer Yannick Djaló.

== Career statistics ==
=== Club ===
As of match played 12 December 2023

Appearances and goals by club, season and competition
| Club | Season | League | | | National cup | | League cup | | Continental | | Other | | Total | |
| Club | Season | Division | Apps | Goals | Apps | Goals | Apps | Goals | Apps | Goals | Apps | Goals | Apps | Goals |
|---|---|---|---|---|---|---|---|---|---|---|---|---|---|---|
| AEL Limassol | 2012–13 | Cypriot First Division | 6 | 0 | 0 | 0 | — | | — | | — | | 6 | 0 |
| AEL Limassol | 2013–14 | Cypriot First Division | 3 | 1 | 0 | 0 | — | | — | | — | | 3 | 1 |
| AEL Limassol | Total | | 9 | 1 | 0 | 0 | — | | — | | — | | 9 | 1 |
| Beira-Mar | 2014–15 | Segunda Liga | 5 | 0 | 0 | 0 | 2 | 0 | — | | — | | 7 | 0 |
| Rapid București | 2015–16 | Liga II | 10 | 2 | 0 | 0 | — | | — | | — | | 10 | 2 |
| Fjarðabyggð | 2016 | 1. deild karla | 9 | 3 | 0 | 0 | — | | — | | — | | 9 | 3 |
| Ayia Napa | 2016–17 | Cypriot Second Division | 26 | 11 | 0 | 0 | — | | — | | — | | 26 | 11 |
| Raków Częstochowa | 2017–18 | I liga | 25 | 5 | 1 | 0 | — | | — | | — | | 26 | 5 |
| Casa Pia | 2018–19 | Campeonato de Portugal | 29 | 5 | 2 | 3 | — | | — | | — | | 31 | 8 |
| Puszcza Niepołomice | 2019–20 | I liga | 19 | 6 | 1 | 0 | — | | — | | — | | 20 | 6 |
| Olimpia Grudziądz | 2019–20 | I liga | 6 | 1 | — | | — | | — | | — | | 6 | 1 |
| Olimpia Grudziądz | 2020–21 | II liga | 34 | 15 | 1 | 0 | — | | — | | — | | 35 | 15 |
| Olimpia Grudziądz | Total | | 40 | 16 | 1 | 0 | — | | — | | — | | 41 | 16 |
| Alashkert | 2021–22 | Armenian Premier League | 28 | 7 | 1 | 0 | — | | 13 (Note: Four appearances in the UEFA Champions League, three appearances and two goals in the UEFA Europa League, and six appearances and two goals in the UEFA Europa Conference League) | 4 | 1 (Note: Appearance and goal in the Armenian Supercup) | 1 | 43 | 12 |
| Sabah | 2022 | Malaysia Super League | 7 | 1 | 1 | 0 | — | | — | | — | | 8 | 1 |
| Nejmeh | 2023–24 | Lebanese Premier League | 10 | 6 | — | | — | | 5 (Note: Appearance in the AFC Cup) | 0 | — | | 15 | 6 |
| Career total | | | 218 | 63 | 6 | 3 | 2 | 0 | 18 | 4 | 1 | 1 | 245 | 71 |

=== International ===
As of match played 23 March 2022

| National team | Year | Apps | Goals |
|---|---|---|---|
| Guinea-Bissau | 2022 | 1 | 2 |
| Total | | 1 | 2 |

Scores and results list Guinea-Bissau's goal tally first. Score column indicates score after each Embaló goal.

| No. | Date | Venue | Opponent | Score | Result | Competition |
|---|---|---|---|---|---|---|
| 1. | 23 March 2022 | Estádio Municipal de Óbidos, Óbidos, Portugal | Equatorial Guinea | 1–0 | 3–0 | Friendly |
| 2. | 23 March 2022 | Estádio Municipal de Óbidos, Óbidos, Portugal | Equatorial Guinea | 2–0 | 3–0 | Friendly |

== Honours ==
Alashkert

- Armenian Supercup: 2021

Nejmeh

- Lebanese Premier League: 2023–24
- Lebanese Super Cup: 2023
