= Manvel Agaronyan =

Russian football player

Personal information
- Full name: Manvel Ashotovich Agaronyan
- Date of birth: 30 November 1997 (age 28)
- Place of birth: Vosketas, Armenia
- Height: 1.75 m (5 ft 9 in)
- Positions: Midfielder; forward

Senior career*
Years	Team	Apps	(Gls)
2015–2018	SKA-Energiya Khabarovsk	1	(0)
2016–2017	→ Smena Komsomolsk-na-Amure (loan)	11	(0)
2018–2019	Chernomorets Novorossiysk	27	(7)
2019–2021	Luki-Energiya	51	(9)
2022	Alashkert	1	(0)
2022–2023	Luki-Energiya	29	(7)
2023–2024	Murom	14	(0)
2024	Luki-Energiya	28	(3)
- * Club domestic league appearances and goals as of 3 November 2024

Manvel Ashotovich Agaronyan (Russian: Манвел Ашотович Агаронян; born 30 November 1997) is an Armenian football player.

== Club career ==
He made his debut in the Russian Football National League for SKA-Energiya Khabarovsk on 10 August 2015 in a game against Baltika Kaliningrad.

On 26 January 2022, Agaronyan joined Alashkert in Armenia.
