= Artak Grigoryan =

Armenian footballer

Personal information
- Full name: Artak Gareginovich Grigoryan
- Date of birth: 19 October 1987 (age 39)
- Place of birth: Yerevan, Armenian SSR, Soviet Union
- Height: 1.82 m (6 ft 0 in)
- Position: Midfielder

Senior career*
Years	Team	Apps	(Gls)
2007–2008	Shirak	32	(0)
2008–2009	Ararat Yerevan	31	(2)
2010–2013	Ulisses	89	(10)
2013–2015	Gandzasar Kapan	38	(1)
2015	Mika	7	(2)
2015–2023	Alashkert	207	(4)
2023–2024	Pyunik	31	(1)

International career
2010–2022	Armenia	51	(1)
- * Club domestic league appearances and goals

Artak Grigoryan (Armenian: Արտակ Գրիգորյան; born 19 October 1987) is an Armenian former professional footballer who played as a midfielder. He made 51 appearances for the Armenia national team, scoring once. In December 2024, Grigoryan announced the end of his football career.

== Career statistics ==
Appearances and goals by national team and year
National team	Year	Apps	Goals
Armenia	2010	1	0
Armenia	2011	0	0
Armenia	2012	0	0
Armenia	2013	0	0
Armenia	2014	0	0
Armenia	2015	1	0
Armenia	2016	3	1
Armenia	2017	6	0
Armenia	2018	6	0
Armenia	2019	9	0
Armenia	2020	6	0
Armenia	2021	11	0
Armenia	2022	8	0
Total		51	1

As of goal scored on 11 November 2016
Scores and results list Armenia's goal tally first, score column indicates score after each Armenian goal.

List of international goals scored by Artak Grigoryan
No.	Date	Venue	Opponent	Score	Result	Competition	Ref.
1	11 November 2016	Republican Stadium, Yerevan, Armenia	Montenegro	1–2	3–2	2018 FIFA World Cup qualification	

== Honours ==
Pyunik

- Armenian Premier League: 2023–24

Alashkert

- Armenian Premier League: 2015–16, 2016–17, 2017–18, 2020–21
- Armenian Cup: 2018–19
- Armenian Supercup: 2016, 2018, 2021

Ulisses FC

- Armenian Premier League: 2011
