= Konstantin Zaytsev =

Russian footballer and coach

Personal information
- Full name: Konstantin Nikolayevich Zaytsev
- Date of birth: 16 December 1983 (age 42)
- Place of birth: Donetsk, Ukrainian SSR
- Height: 1.81 m (5 ft 11 1/2 in)
- Position: Defender

Team information
- Current team: FC Yenisey Krasnoyarsk (assistant coach)

Youth career
- FC Shakhtar Donetsk

Senior career*
Years	Team	Apps	(Gls)
2001–2002	FC Metalurh-2 Donetsk	1	(0)
2002–2003	FC Stal Dniprodzerzhynsk	13	(2)
2003–2007	FC SKA-Energiya Khabarovsk	93	(1)
2008	FC Vityaz Podolsk	29	(0)
2009–2012	FC Mordovia Saransk	64	(3)
2012	FC Tyumen	3	(0)
2013	FC Zvezda Ryazan	2	(0)
2013–2016	FC Dynamo Bryansk	63	(1)

Managerial career
- 2018–2019: FC Algoritm Saint Petersburg
- 2020–2021: FC Zvezda Saint Petersburg (assistant)
- 2021–2022: FC Van (assistant)
- 2022: FC Znamya Truda Orekhovo-Zuyevo (assistant)
- 2022–: FC Yenisey Krasnoyarsk (assistant)
- * Club domestic league appearances and goals

Konstantin Nikolayevich Zaytsev (Russian: Константин Николаевич Зайцев; born 16 December 1983) is a Russian professional football coach and a former player. He is an assistant coach with FC Yenisey Krasnoyarsk. He also holds Ukrainian citizenship as Kostyantyn Mykolayovych Zaytsev (Ukrainian: Костянтин Миколайович Зайцев).

== Club career ==
He played 8 seasons in the Russian Football National League for FC SKA-Energiya Khabarovsk, FC Vityaz Podolsk and FC Mordovia Saransk.
