= Levon Bayramyan =

Russian footballer

Personal information
- Full name: Levon Robertovich Bayramyan
- Date of birth: 17 January 1998 (age 28)
- Place of birth: Grekovo-Timofeyevka, Russia
- Height: 1.70 m (5 ft 7 in)
- Position: Midfielder

Youth career
- 2014–2019: FC Krasnodar

Senior career*
Years	Team	Apps	(Gls)
2016–2021	FC Krasnodar-2	54	(0)
2018–2021	FC Krasnodar-3	8	(0)
2021–2022	FC Alashkert-2	5	(0)
2022	FC SKA Rostov-on-Don	0	(0)
2022–2023	FC Druzhba Maykop	19	(0)
- * Club domestic league appearances and goals

Levon Robertovich Bayramyan (Russian: Левон Робертович Байрамян; born 17 January 1998) is a Russian former football player of Armenian descent.

== Club career ==
He made his debut in the Russian Football National League for FC Krasnodar-2 on 22 August 2020 in a game against FC Akron Tolyatti.

== Personal life ==
His older brother Khoren Bayramyan is also a professional footballer.
