= Didier Kadio =

Ivorian footballer (born 1990)

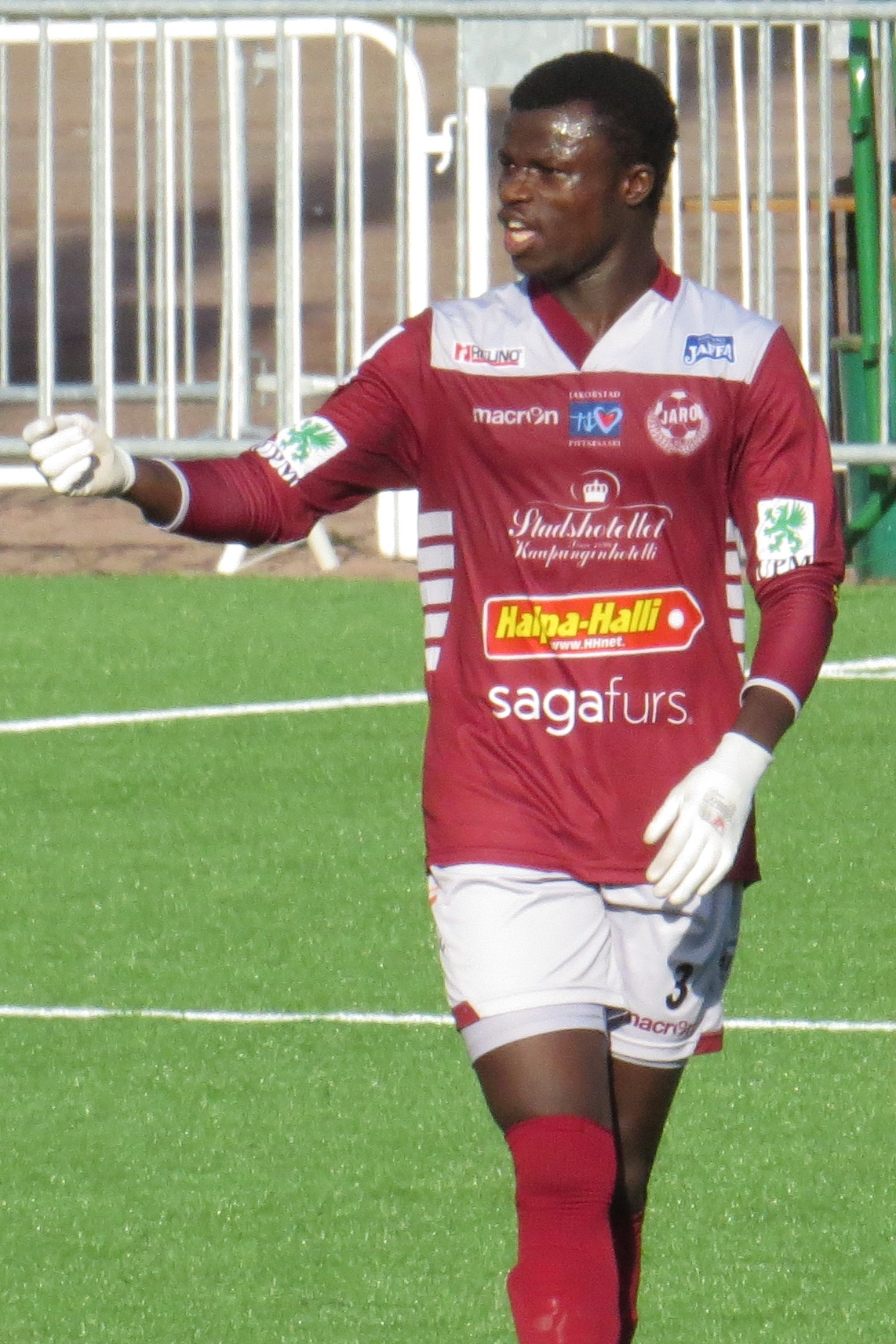
- Kadio with FF Jaro

Personal information
- Full name: Didier Boris Kadio
- Date of birth: 5 April 1990 (age 36)
- Place of birth: Man, Ivory Coast
- Height: 1.78 m (5 ft 10 in)
- Positions: Defender; defensive midfielder

Youth career
- 2008–2012: ASEC Mimosas

Senior career*
Years	Team	Apps	(Gls)
2012–2015	Shirak	56	(4)
2014	→ Zhetysu (loan)	24	(0)
2015	Jaro	31	(5)
2016	Zhetysu	21	(2)
2016	Kerala Blasters	12	(1)
2017	Shakhter Karagandy	12	(0)
2017–2018	Pyunik	18	(2)
2018–2019	SJK	26	(0)
2020	Al-Hilal Club		
2021–2022	Alashkert	58	(1)
2023	Zhetysu	23	(0)

International career
- Ivory Coast U17
- Ivory Coast U20
- Ivory Coast U23
- * Club domestic league appearances and goals as of 23 November 2023

Didier Kadio (born 5 April 1990) is an Ivorian professional footballer who plays as a defender or defensive midfielder.

== Career ==
At the beginning of April 2014, Kadio moved to Kazakhstan, signing a loan deal with FC Zhetysu until the end of the 2014 season. Kadio returned to FC Shirak in December 2014, before signing for FF Jaro in Finland during February 2015.

On 22 January 2016, Kadio re-signed for Zhetysu.

On 30 August 2016, Kadio joined Kerala Blasters in the Indian Super League. He scored his first goal for Kerala Blasters by levelling against Chennaiyin in Kochi on 12 November 2016. Kerala Blasters eventually won that match with score 3–1.

On 10 August 2018, SJK announced the signing of Kadio after his Pyunik contract expired on 8 August 2018. On 2 December 2019, SJK announced that Kadio had left the club after the expiration of his contract.

Kadio joined Al-Hilal Club on 8 January 2020.

On 9 February 2021 Kadio signed for FC Alashkert. On 24 December 2022, Alashkert announced the departure of Kadio.

On 24 January 2023, Zhetysu announced the return of Kadio.

== Career statistics ==
As of match played 29 October 2023

Appearances and goals by club, season and competition
Club	Season	League			National cup		League cup		Continental		Other		Total	
Club	Season	Division	Apps	Goals	Apps	Goals	Apps	Goals	Apps	Goals	Apps	Goals	Apps	Goals
Shirak	2012–13	Armenian Premier League	39	2	8	0	0	0	4	0	0	0	47	2
Shirak	2013–14	Armenian Premier League	17	2	1	0	0	0	4	0	1	0	19	2
Shirak	Total		56	4	10	0	0	0	8	0	1	1	75	5
Zhetysu (loan)	2014	Kazakhstan Premier League	24	0	0	0	0	0	–		0	0	24	0
Jaro	2015	Veikkausliiga	31	5	0	0	0	0	–		0	0	31	5
Zhetysu	2016	Kazakhstan Premier League	21	2	2	0	–		–		–		23	2
Kerala Blasters	2016	Indian Super League	12	1	–		–		–		0	0	12	1
Shakhter Karagandy	2017	Kazakhstan Premier League	12	0	3	1	–		–		–		15	1
Pyunik	2017–18	Armenian Premier League	18	2	0	0	–		–		–		18	2
Pyunik	2018–19	Armenian Premier League	0	0	0	0	–		5	0	–		5	0
Pyunik	Total		18	2	0	0	0	0	5	0	0	0	23	2
SJK	2018	Veikkausliiga	10	0	0	0	–		–		–		10	0
SJK	2019	Veikkausliiga	16	0	5	1	–		–		–		21	1
SJK	Total		26	0	5	1	0	0	0	0	0	0	31	1
Alashkert	2020–21	Armenian Premier League	13	0	5	0	–		0	0	–		18	0
Alashkert	2021–22	Armenian Premier League	29	1	1	0	–		12	0	1	0	43	1
Alashkert	2022–23	Armenian Premier League	16	0	2	0	–		2	0	–		20	1
Alashkert	Total		58	1	8	0	0	0	14	0	1	0	81	1
Zhetysu	2023	Kazakhstan Premier League	23	0	1	0	–		–		–		24	0
Career total			279	15	29	2	0	0	27	0	4	0	338	17

== Honours ==
Shirak

- Armenian Premier League: 2012–13
- Armenian Independence Cup: 2011–12

Kerala Blasters

- Indian Super League runner-up: 2016
