= Yevgeni Yatchenko =

Russian footballer

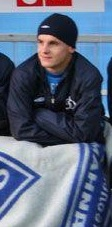
- Evgeny Yatchenko in 2006

Personal information
- Full name: Yevgeni Ivanovich Yatchenko
- Date of birth: 25 August 1986 (age 40)
- Place of birth: Moscow, Soviet Union
- Height: 1.71 m (5 ft 7 in)
- Position: Right-back

Senior career*
Years	Team	Apps	(Gls)
2004–2008	Dynamo Moscow	2	(0)
2007–2008	→ Metallurg-Kuzbass (loan)	70	(14)
2009–2011	Ural Yekaterinburg	39	(1)
2010	→ Volgar-Gazprom (loan)	36	(5)
2012–2018	Shinnik Yaroslavl	191	(4)
2018–2020	Mordovia Saransk	57	(0)
2020–2021	Olimp-Dolgoprudny	23	(0)
2021–2022	Alashkert	10	(0)
- * Club domestic league appearances and goals

Yevgeni Ivanovich Yatchenko (Russian: Евгений Иванович Ятченко; born 25 August 1986) is a Russian former footballer.

== Club career ==
He made his debut for the senior squad of FC Dynamo Moscow on 5 March 2006 in a Russian Cup game against PFC Krylia Sovetov Samara. He made his Russian Premier League debut for Dynamo on 9 April 2006 in a game against FC Amkar Perm.

== Personal life ==
He is an identical twin brother of Dmitri Yatchenko.
