= Matheus Alessandro =

Brazilian footballer (born 1996)

Personal information
- Full name: Matheus Alessandro dos Santos Pereira
- Date of birth: 10 July 1996 (age 30)
- Place of birth: Rio de Janeiro, Brazil
- Height: 1.71 m (5 ft 7 in)
- Position: Winger

Team information
- Current team: União de Leiria

Youth career
- Xerém
- 2012–2017: Fluminense

Senior career*
Years	Team	Apps	(Gls)
2017–2021	Fluminense	53	(1)
2019	→ Fortaleza (loan)	15	(0)
2020	→ Botafogo-SP (loan)	8	(0)
2021	Atibaia	9	(0)
2021	Alashkert	1	(0)
2022	Boavista SC	10	(0)
2022	→ Volta Redonda (loan)	17	(1)
2022–2023	Ponte Preta	0	(0)
2023	→ Boavista SC (loan)	8	(2)
2023	→ Volta Redonda (loan)	6	(0)
2023	→ Santa Cruz (loan)	2	(0)
2023–2024	Boavista SC	10	(0)
2024	Portuguesa RJ	4	(0)
2024–	União de Leiria	0	(0)
- * Club domestic league appearances and goals as of 10 July 2024

Matheus Alessandro dos Santos Pereira (born 10 July 1996) is a Brazilian professional footballer who plays as a winger for Portuguese club União de Leiria.

== Club career ==
Born in Rio de Janeiro, Alessandro started his youth career with the academy of Xerém. In 2012, he signed for the under-17 team of Fluminense, after impressing the club's scouts during Taça das Favelas. He won the Brasileiro under-20 with the youth side in 2016.

Ahead of the 2017 season, Alessandro was promoted to the senior team. On 27 April 2017, he made his first team debut in a 1–1 draw against Brasil de Pelotas, in Primeira Liga. On 11 May, his contract was extended till 2020. He made his league debut on 3 June, coming on as a substitute for Renato in a 3–1 victory against Vitória. On 4 November, he scored his first goal for the club, scoring the winning goal in a 2–1 triumph over Botafogo.

On 7 January 2019, Alessandro joined Fortaleza on loan for the upcoming season. He went to South Korea on the pause for the 2019 American Cup.

In July 2019, Alessandro joined Daejeon FC on loan for the upcoming season. However it was cancelled due to medical tests.

On 11 September 2021, FC Alashkert announced the signing of Alessandro. On 3 January 2022, Boavista announced Alessandro's signing.

== Career statistics ==
As of match played on 11 November 2018

Club	Season	League			State League		Cup		Continental		Other		Total	
Club	Season	Division	Apps	Goals	Apps	Goals	Apps	Goals	Apps	Goals	Apps	Goals	Apps	Goals
Fluminense	2017	Série A	18	1	0	0	0	0	0	0	2 (Note: Appearances in Primeira Liga)	0	20	1
Fluminense	2018	Série A	22	0	5	0	2	0	6 (Note: Appearance(s) in Copa Libertadores)	0	—		35	0
Fluminense	Total		40	1	5	0	2	0	6	0	2	0	55	1
Career total			40	1	5	0	2	0	6	0	2	0	55	1

== Personal life ==
Alessandro's father represented CR Vasco da Gama as a youth and died when Alessandro was two years old. His uncle, Fernando is a former professional footballer who amongst other clubs played for Vasco da Gama and Flamengo.
