= Aleksandr Grigoryan =

Armenian footballer and coach

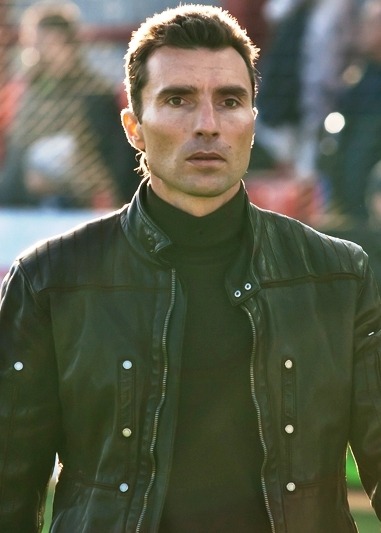
- Grigoryan in 2011

Personal information
- Full name: Aleksandr Vitalyevich Grigoryan
- Date of birth: 28 September 1966 (age 60)
- Place of birth: Yerevan, Soviet Union

Senior career*
Years	Team	Apps	(Gls)
1990–1991	Alashkert	10	(0)

Managerial career
- 1991–1993: Asmaral Kislovodsk (scout)
- 1993–1994: DYuSSh-3 Kislovodsk
- 1994–1996: Olimp Kislovodsk (scout)
- 1996: Nart Cherkessk (assistant)
- 1996: Nika Krasny Sulin (academy)
- 1998–1999: CSKA Kislovodsk (academy)
- 1999–2001: Energy Voronezh (assistant)
- 2002–2005: WFC Lada Togliatti
- 2006: WFC Nadezhda Noginsk
- 2007–2009: Zvezda-2005 Perm
- 2009–2010: Nizhny Novgorod
- 2011: Khimki
- 2011–2012: SKA-Khabarovsk
- 2013: Mashuk-KMV Pyatigorsk
- 2013–2014: Luch-Energiya Vladivostok
- 2014–2015: Tosno
- 2015: Pakhtakor (consultant)
- 2015–2017: SKA-Khabarovsk
- 2017: Anzhi Makhachkala
- 2017: Ararat Moscow
- 2017–2018: Luch-Energiya Vladivostok
- 2018–2019: CSKA Moscow (women)
- 2019: Tambov
- 2019–2021: Urartu
- 2021: Alashkert
- 2021–2022: CSKA Moscow (women)
- 2023: Kuban Krasnodar
- * Club domestic league appearances and goals

Aleksandr Vitalyevich Grigoryan (Russian: Александр Витальевич Григорян; born 28 September 1966) is an Armenian professional football coach and a former player. He also holds Russian citizenship.

== Managerial career ==
In August 2015, Grigoryan left his role as consultant to Pakhtakor Tashkent.

On 5 January 2017 Grigoryan and SKA-Khabarovsk parted ways by mutual agreement, taking over as manager of Anzhi Makhachkala on the same day. Following Anzhi's defeat to Dynamo Moscow on 12 August 2017, Grigoryan resigned as the club's manager, before being appointed FC Ararat Moscow's new manager two days later.

He was hired as the manager of Luch-Energiya Vladivostok on 26 December 2017. He was fired from Luch-Energiya on 20 April 2018.

On 19 October 2019 Grigoryan left FC Tambov by mutual consent after they lost their 4th game in a row and remained at the last place in the Russian Premier League.

On 24 November 2019, Grigoryan was appointed as manager of FC Urartu after the resignation of Ilshat Fayzulin. He left FC Urartu on 10 March 2021.

On 20 May 2021, Grigoryan was announced as FC Alashkerts new Head Coach. Grigoryan left Alashkert on 22 July 2021 due to his wife's poor health, returning to the club on 31 July 2021. On 20 September 2021 he announced his retirement.

From September 2021 to October 2022 - head coach of the CSKA women's football team.

On 17 May 2023, Grigoryan was hired by Russian First League club Kuban Krasnodar.
