= Aleksandar Glišić (footballer) =

Bosnian footballer

Personal information
- Date of birth: 3 September 1992 (age 34)
- Place of birth: Bosnia and Herzegovina
- Height: 1.83 m (6 ft 0 in)
- Position: Forward

Team information
- Current team: Hayk
- Number: 76

Senior career*
Years	Team	Apps	(Gls)
–2011	FK Sloga Srbac		
2011	Crvena Zemlja		
2015–2018	Radnik Bijeljina	65	(8)
2019	Banants	14	(5)
2019–2021	Alashkert	48	(15)
2022	Dinamo Samarqand	4	(0)
2022–2023	Ararat Yerevan	17	(3)
2023	Noah	5	(0)
2023	Noah II	2	(0)
2024–2025	Alashkert	18	(0)
2025–	Hayk	9	(4)
- * Club domestic league appearances and goals as of 6 December 2025

Aleksandar Glišić (born 3 September 1992) is a Bosnian professional footballer who plays as a forward.

== Club career ==
Born in Bosnia and Herzegovina, Glisic started his senior career with FK Sloga Srbac. In 2016. he signed for FK Radnik Bijeljina in the Premier League of Bosnia and Herzegovina, where he made over sixty-seven appearances and scored eight goals. Thereafter, he played for Urartu and Alashkert.

In August 2019, Glišić signed for Alashkert from Banants.

In January 2022, Glišić signed for Dinamo Samarqand.

On 14 June 2022, Ararat Yerevan announced the signing of Glišić.
