= 2020–21 Shirak SC season =

Shirak
2020-21 season
- Chairman: Arman Sahakyan
- Manager: Vacant
- Stadium: Gyumri City Stadium
- Premier League: 9th
- Armenian Cup: First round vs Alashkert
- Europa League: First qualifying round vs FCSB
- Top goalscorer: League: Three players (2); All: Four players (2)

The 2020–21 season was Shirak's 30th consecutive season in the Armenian Premier League.

== Season events ==
On 27 July, Shirak announced the signings of Gevorg Kasparov, Hovhannes Nazaryan and Vardan Bakalyan.

On 31 July, Shirak announced that Junior Avo Leibe and Artyom Gevorkyan had signed new one-year contracts with the club.

On 18 August, the FFA postponed the match between Shirak and Ararat Yerevan due to the COVID-19 outbreak within the Ararat squad.

On 25 August, Shirak announced that Vsevolod Yermakov, Marko Prljević, Uroš Nenadović, Solomon Udo, Hrayr Mkoyan, Zhirayr Margaryan, Karen Muradyan, Edgar Malakyan and David Manoyan had all joined Shirak on a short-term contracts to aid Shirak in their UEFA Europa League qualifying game on 27 August.

On 9 September, the Football Federation of Armenia announced that Shirak's game at home to Van, scheduled for 11 September, had been postponed.

On 29 September, the season was suspended indefinitely due to the escalating 2020 Nagorno-Karabakh conflict. On 13 October, the FFA announced that the season would resume on 17 October.

On 23 December, Emil Yeghiazaryan, Vardan Bakalyan and Gevorg Kasparov all left Shirak.

On 16 January, Shirak announced the signing of Spasoje Stefanović on a free transfer after he'd left Ararat Yerevan.

On 4 February, Shirak announced the return of Igor Stanojević on a free transfer after he too had left Ararat Yerevan.

On 9 April, Shirak match against Alashkert was postponed as Alashkert were unable to travel to Gyumri due to protests. The following day, the match was rearranged for 11 April.

== Squad ==
As of match played 28 May 2021

No.	Name	Nationality	Position	Date of birth (age)	Signed from	Signed in	Contract ends	Apps.	Goals
Goalkeepers
1	Sokrat Hovhannisyan	(Armenia)	GK	5 April 1996 (age 30)	Academy	2017		7	0
26	Spasoje Stefanović	(Serbia)	GK	12 October 1992 (age 33)	Ararat Yerevan	2021		13	0
55	Lyova Karapetyan	(Armenia)	GK	1 March 2001 (age 25)	Academy	2020		1	0
Defenders
2	Robert Hakobyan	(Armenia)	DF	22 October 1996 (age 29)	Pyunik	2021		9	1
3	Hovhannes Nazaryan	(Armenia)	DF	11 March 1998 (age 28)	Noah	2020	2021	20	0
4	Artyom Mikaelyan	(Armenia)	DF	12 July 1991 (age 35)	Academy	2010		159	4
5	Hakob Vardanyan	(Armenia)	DF	1 July 1999 (age 27)	Academy	2019		4	0
8	Hrachya Geghamyan	(Armenia)	DF	2 December 1999 (age 26)	loan from Urartu	2020		5	0
22	Arsen Sadoyan	(Armenia)	DF	16 March 1999 (age 27)	loan from Urartu	2020		11	0
25	Aghvan Davoyan	(Armenia)	DF	21 March 1990 (age 36)	Academy	2010		239	1
37	Seryozha Urushanyan	(Armenia)	DF	1 August 1997 (age 29)	Academy	2020		16	0
89	Hayk Ishkhanyan	(Armenia)	DF	24 June 1989 (age 37)	Gandzasar Kapan	2021			
95	Vardan Arzoyan	(Armenia)	DF	30 April 1995 (age 31)	Gandzasar Kapan	2020		19	0
Midfielders
6	Erik Vardanyan	(Armenia)	MF	8 February 1999 (age 27)	loan from Urartu	2020		17	0
7	Arman Aslanyan	(Armenia)	MF	30 January 1994 (age 32)	Academy	2013		85	3
11	Martin Grigoryan	(Armenia)	MF	25 September 2000 (age 25)		2020		16	0
18	Rafik Misakyan	(Armenia)	MF	2 January 2000 (age 26)	Banants	2018		33	0
20	Rudik Mkrtchyan	(Armenia)	MF	26 October 1998 (age 27)	Academy	2017		81	3
21	Artyom Gevorkyan	(Russia)	MF	21 May 1993 (age 33)	Chayka Peschanokopskoye	2019	2021	56	4
23	Petros Afajanyan	(Armenia)	MF	31 October 1998 (age 27)	Ararat Yerevan	2020		13	0
29	Tidiane Diomandé	(Ivory Coast)	MF	14 March 1999 (age 27)	San Pédro	2021		5	0
30	Levon Darbinyan	(Armenia)	MF	24 January 2002 (age 24)	Youth team	2018		4	0
50	Igor Stanojević	(Serbia)	MF	24 October 1991 (age 34)	Ararat Yerevan	2021		46	8
54	Sergey Manukyan	(Armenia)	MF	3 April 2004 (age 22)	Youth team	2020		1	0
99	Junior Avo Leibe	(Ivory Coast)	MF	20 December 1997 (age 28)	SC Gagnoa	2020	2021	29	1
Forwards
9	Aram Muradyan	(Armenia)	FW	14 April 1995 (age 31)	Academy	2013		164	17
17	Arlen Tsaturyan	(Armenia)	FW	5 January 1999 (age 27)	Academy	2017		21	0
19	Yacouba Silue	(Ivory Coast)	FW	1 January 2002 (age 24)	SO de l'Armée	2021		13	1
38	Albert Darbinyan	(Armenia)	FW	2 January 2002 (age 24)	Academy	2018		2	0
39	Lyova Mryan	(Armenia)	FW	11 May 2000 (age 26)	Academy	2018		24	1
Players out on loan
Players who left during the season
2	Marko Prljević	(Serbia)	DF	2 August 1988 (age 38)	loan from Ararat Yerevan	2020	2020	80	2
8	Zhirayr Margaryan	(Armenia)	DF	13 September 1997 (age 28)	loan from Ararat Yerevan	2020	2020	75	3
10	Edgar Malakyan	(Armenia)	MF	22 September 1990 (age 35)	loan from Ararat Yerevan	2020	2020	51	2
11	Solomon Udo	(Nigeria)	MF	15 July 1995 (age 31)	Shirak	2020		106	9
14	Emil Yeghiazaryan	(Armenia)	MF	3 November 1997 (age 28)	Gandzasar Kapan	2020		7	0
19	Karen Muradyan	(Armenia)	MF	1 November 1992 (age 33)	loan from Ararat Yerevan	2020	2020	165	3
22	Hrayr Mkoyan	(Armenia)	DF	2 September 1986 (age 39)	loan from Ararat Yerevan	2020	2020	104+	3+
26	David Manoyan	(Armenia)	MF	5 July 1990 (age 36)	loan from Ararat Yerevan	2020	2020	14	0
45	Vsevolod Yermakov	(Russia)	GK	6 January 1996 (age 30)	loan from Ararat Yerevan	2020	2020	73	0
70	Uroš Nenadović	(Serbia)	FW	28 January 1994 (age 32)	loan from Ararat Yerevan	2020	2020	11	2
77	Gevorg Kasparov	(Armenia)	GK	25 July 1980 (age 46)	Gandzasar Kapan	2020	2021	7	0
88	Vardan Bakalyan	(Armenia)	FW	4 April 1995 (age 31)	Van	2020	2021	42	5
98	Mory Kone	(Ivory Coast)	FW	13 July 1995 (age 31)	BFC Daugavpils	2019		31	23

== Transfers ==
=== In ===
Date	Position	Nationality	Name	From	Fee	Ref.
27 July 2020	GK	(Armenia)	Gevorg Kasparov	Gandzasar Kapan	Free	
27 July 2020	DF	(Armenia)	Hovhannes Nazaryan	Noah	Undisclosed	
27 July 2020	FW	(Armenia)	Vardan Bakalyan	Van	Undisclosed	
1 August 2020	MF	(Armenia)	Petros Afajanyan	Ararat Yerevan	Undisclosed	
12 August 2020	MF	(Armenia)	Martin Grigoryan			
15 August 2020	MF	(Armenia)	Emil Yeghiazaryan	Gandzasar Kapan	Undisclosed	
15 August 2020	MF	(Nigeria)	Solomon Udo	Shirak	Free	
16 January 2021	GK	(Serbia)	Spasoje Stefanović	Ararat Yerevan	Free	
4 February 2021	MF	(Serbia)	Igor Stanojević	Ararat Yerevan	Free	
20 February 2021	DF	(Armenia)	Hayk Ishkhanyan	Gandzasar Kapan	Free	
20 February 2021	FW	(Ivory Coast)	Yacouba Silue	SO de l'Armée	Undisclosed	
23 February 2021	DF	(Armenia)	Robert Hakobyan	Pyunik		
28 February 2021	MF	(Ivory Coast)	Tidiane Diomandé	San Pédro		

=== Loans in ===
Start date	Position	Nationality	Name	From	End date	Ref.
15 August 2020	DF	(Armenia)	Hrachya Geghamyan	Urartu	End of season	
15 August 2020	DF	(Armenia)	Arsen Sadoyan	Urartu	End of season	
15 August 2020	DF	(Armenia)	Erik Vardanyan	Urartu	End of season	
25 August 2020	GK	(Russia)	Vsevolod Yermakov	Ararat Yerevan	Short-term	
25 August 2020	DF	(Armenia)	Zhirayr Margaryan	Ararat Yerevan	Short-term	
25 August 2020	DF	(Armenia)	Hrayr Mkoyan	Ararat Yerevan	Short-term	
25 August 2020	DF	(Serbia)	Marko Prljević	Ararat Yerevan	Short-term	
25 August 2020	MF	(Armenia)	Edgar Malakyan	Ararat Yerevan	Short-term	
25 August 2020	MF	(Armenia)	David Manoyan	Ararat Yerevan	Short-term	
25 August 2020	MF	(Armenia)	Karen Muradyan	Ararat Yerevan	Short-term	
25 August 2020	FW	(Serbia)	Uroš Nenadović	Ararat Yerevan	Short-term	

=== Out ===
Date	Position	Nationality	Name	To	Fee	Ref.
25 July 2020	MF	(Armenia)	David Manoyan	Ararat Yerevan	Undisclosed	
26 July 2020	MF	(Armenia)	Karen Muradyan	Ararat Yerevan	Undisclosed	
27 July 2020	GK	(Russia)	Vsevolod Yermakov	Ararat Yerevan	Undisclosed	
27 July 2020	MF	(Armenia)	Edgar Malakyan	Ararat Yerevan	Undisclosed	
28 July 2020	DF	(Armenia)	Hrayr Mkoyan	Ararat Yerevan	Undisclosed	
29 July 2020	DF	(Armenia)	Zhirayr Margaryan	Ararat Yerevan	Undisclosed	
31 July 2020	DF	(Serbia)	Marko Prljević	Ararat Yerevan	Undisclosed	
31 July 2020	FW	(Serbia)	Uroš Nenadović	Ararat Yerevan	Undisclosed	
3 August 2020	DF	(Armenia)	Vardan Shakhbazyan	Noah	Undisclosed	
10 September 2020	FW	(Ivory Coast)	Mory Kone	Ararat Yerevan	Undisclosed	

=== Loans out ===
Date	Position	Nationality	Name	From	Date to	Ref.
1 January 2020	MF	(Armenia)	Levon Darbinyan	BKMA Yerevan	31 December 2020	

=== Released ===
Date	Position	Nationality	Name	Joined	Date	Ref.
31 July 2020	MF	(Nigeria)	Solomon Udo	Shirak	25 August 2020	
10 September 2020	MF	(Nigeria)	Solomon Udo	Ararat Yerevan	10 September 2020	
23 December 2020	GK	(Armenia)	Gevorg Kasparov	Alashkert	21 February 2021	
23 December 2020	MF	(Armenia)	Emil Yeghiazaryan			
23 December 2020	FW	(Armenia)	Vardan Bakalyan	Lori	17 February 2021	

=== Trial ===
Date From	Position	Nationality	Name	From	Date To	Ref.
7 January 2021	MF	(Ivory Coast)	Tidiane Diomandé	San Pédro		
7 January 2021	FW	(Ivory Coast)	Yacouba Silue	SO de l'Armée		

== Friendlies ==
1 August 2020	Shirak	2 – 7	Ararat Yerevan	Gyumri
12:00 (UTC+4)	A.Aslanyan; A.Muradyan	Report	K.Muradyan; Kozlov; G.Muradyan; R.Hakobyan; D.Baghdasaryan	Stadium: Gyumri City Stadium

8 August 2020	Shirak	3 – 2	Sevan	Gyumri
15:30 (UTC+4)	L.Mryan	Report	Goal	Stadium: Gyumri City Stadium

31 January 2021	Shirak	2 – 1	Sevan	Dzoraghbyur
(UTC+4)	A.Aslanyan; A.Muradyan	Report	Goal	Stadium: Dzoraghbyur Training Centre

5 February 2021	Shirak	1 – 0	Noravank	Dzoraghbyur
(UTC+4)	V.Arzoyan	Report		Stadium: Dzoraghbyur Training Centre

11 February 2021	Shirak	1 – 2	West Armenia	Dzoraghbyur
(UTC+4)	A.Aslanyan	Report	Goal	Stadium: Dzoraghbyur Training Centre

27 March 2021	Shirak	0 – 3	Ararat Yerevan	Gyumri
(UTC+4)		Report	M.Kone 56'; D.Pobulić 78', 83'	Stadium: Gyumri City Stadium

== Competitions ==
=== Premier League ===
==== Results summary ====
Overall								Home						Away					
Pld	W	D	L	GF	GA	GD	Pts	W	D	L	GF	GA	GD	W	D	L	GF	GA	GD
24	2	7	15	18	53	−35	13	1	5	7	9	23	−14	1	2	8	9	30	−21

Last updated: 28 May 2021.
Source: See Results

==== Results by round ====
Round	1	2	3	4	5	6	7	8	9	10	11	12	13	14	15	16	17	18	19	20	21	22	23	24	25
Ground	A	-	H	A	H	H	A	H	A	A	A	H	H	H	H	A	H	A	H	H	A	H	A	H	A
Result	D	-	L	L	D	L	L	L	L	L	W	L	D	L	D	D	D	L	L	W	L	D	L	L	L
Position	10	-	10	10	10	10	10	9	9	9	8	9	9	9	9	9	9	9	9	9	9	9	9	9	9

Updated to match(es) played on 28 May 2021. Source: See Results
A = Away; H = Home; W = Win; D = Draw; L = Loss

==== Results ====
16 August 2020 1	Noah	2 – 2	Shirak	Yerevan
17:30 (UTC+4)	Spătaru 14'; K.Bor (yellow card) 37'; Dedechko (yellow card) 39'; Simonyan (yellow card) 40'; Azarov 71' (pen.); Deobald (yellow card) 76'; Kovalenko (yellow card) 79'	Report	P.Afajanyan (yellow card) 37'; A.Aslanyan 41' (pen.) (yellow card) 78'; Mikaelyan (yellow card) 54' (goal) 77'; E.Vardanyan (yellow card) 66'; A.Gevorkyan (yellow card) 83'	Stadium: Alashkert Stadium; Attendance: 0 Referee: Shahen Aghayan
Note: Match played behind closed doors due to the COVID-19 pandemic.

23 September 2020 5	Gandzasar Kapan	5 – 0	Shirak	Gyumri
16:15 (UTC+4)	V.Arzoyan 21' (o.g.); D.Minasyan (yellow card) 22'; R.Krusnauskas 32', 65'; Wbeymar 41' (pen.) (yellow card) 51'; Adah 56' (pen.); Ishkhanyan (yellow card) 63'	Report	A.Aslanyan (yellow card) 27'; A.Muradyan (yellow card) 43'; R.Mkrtchyan (yellow card) 46'	Stadium: Gyumri City Stadium; Attendance: 0 Referee: Artur Safaryan
Note: Match played at the Gyumri City Stadium in Gyumri, instead of Gandzasar Kapan's regular Gandzasar Stadium in Kapan. Match played behind closed doors due to the COVID-19 pandemic. Match annulled after Gandzasar Kapan dropped out of the league.

26 September 2020 2	Shirak	0 – 3	Ararat Yerevan	Gyumri
16:15 (UTC+4)	V.Bakalyan (yellow card) 79'	Report	Papikyan 15' (yellow card) 24'; Manoyan 76'; Nenadović 88'	Stadium: Gyumri City Stadium; Attendance: 0 Referee: Artush Kerobyan
Note: Match postponed on 18 August. Match played behind closed doors due to the COVID-19 pandemic.

17 October 2020 8	Ararat-Armenia	7 – 0	Shirak	Yerevan
16:00 (UTC+4)	Otubanjo 7', 55'; Bollo 15'; Mailson 21', 48'; Louis 37', 81'; Vakulenko (yellow card) 50'	Report	A.Gevorkyan (yellow card) 14'	Stadium: FFA Academy Stadium; Attendance: 0 Referee: Henrik Nalbandyan
Note: Match played behind closed doors due to the COVID-19 pandemic.

26 October 2020 9	Shirak	1 – 1	Alashkert	Gyumri
15:30 (UTC+4)	H.Nazaryan (yellow card) 21'; Tomić 50' (o.g.)	Report	Honchar (yellow card) 9'; D.Davidyan 10'; Gome (yellow card) 58'; Bryan (yellow card) 90+4'	Stadium: Gyumri City Stadium; Attendance: 0 Referee: Artem Gasparyan
Note: Match played behind closed doors due to the COVID-19 pandemic.

30 October 2020 10	Shirak	0 – 3	Noah	Gyumri
15:00 (UTC+4)	H.Geghamyan (yellow card) 28'; P.Afajanyan (yellow card) 35'; R.Mkrtchyan (yellow card) 37'; H.Nazaryan (yellow card) 47'; V.Arzoyan (yellow card) 88'	Report	Spătaru 42'; Azarov 48' (pen.), 55'; Kryuchkov (yellow card) 57'; Monroy (yellow card) 89'	Stadium: Gyumri City Stadium; Attendance: 0 Referee: Artur Safaryan
Note: Match played behind closed doors due to the COVID-19 pandemic.

3 November 2020 11	Ararat Yerevan	4 – 0	Shirak	Yerevan
19:00 (UTC+4)	Stanojević 11'; M.Kone 22'; J.Bravo 41'; C.Jiménez (yellow card) 90'; Badoyan 90+2'	Report	E.Yeghiazaryan (yellow card) 27'; H.Vardanyan (yellow card) 49'; R.Mkrtchyan (yellow card) 56'	Stadium: Republican Stadium; Attendance: 0 Referee: Shahen Aghayan
Note: Match played behind closed doors due to the COVID-19 pandemic.

22 November 2020 12	Shirak	0 – 3	Urartu	Gyumri
14:30 (UTC+4)	E.Yeghiazaryan (yellow card) 79'	Report	Kobzar 31'; P.Mutumosi (yellow card) 31'; Vitinho (yellow card) 40' (goal) 60'; Désiré 45'; T.Ayunts (yellow card) 80'	Stadium: Gyumri City Stadium; Attendance: 0 Referee: Artush Kerobyan
Note: Match played behind closed doors due to the COVID-19 pandemic.

26 November 2020 13	Van	3 – 1	Shirak	Charentsavan
14:30 (UTC+4)	M.Manasyan 24'; V.Ayvazyan (yellow card) 50'; Eza 71'; E.Movsesyan 81'	Report	A.Muradyan 37'; A.Davoyan (yellow card) 50'	Stadium: Charentsavan City Stadium; Attendance: 0 Referee: Ashot Ghaltakchyan
Note: Match played behind closed doors due to the COVID-19 pandemic.

8 December 2020 15	Lori	3 – 2	Shirak	Vanadzor
14:00 (UTC+4)	Osipov 17'; Ohayon 49'; A.Kocharyan 85'; Claudir (yellow card) 90+1'	Report	V.Bakalyan (yellow card) 38'; S.Urushanyan (yellow card) 45'; R.Mkrtchyan 48'; Mikaelyan 64'	Stadium: Vanadzor Football Academy; Attendance: 0 Referee: Shahen Aghayan
Note: Match played behind closed doors due to the COVID-19 pandemic.

12 December 2020 7	Pyunik	0 – 1	Shirak	Yerevan
16:30 (UTC+4)	A.Nahapetyan (yellow card) 85'	Report	L.Mryan 11'; A.Arzoyan (yellow card) 43'; A.Gevorkyan 47'	Stadium: Republican Stadium; Attendance: 0 Referee: Artem Gasparyan
Note: Match played behind closed doors due to the COVID-19 pandemic.

20 February 2021 6	Shirak	0 – 1	Lori	Gyumri
14:00 (UTC+4)		Report	Rudoselskiy (yellow card) 25'; Claudir (yellow card) 48'; Skoblikov 90+2'	Stadium: Gyumri City Stadium; Attendance: 0 Referee: Shahen Aghayan
Note: Match played behind closed doors due to the COVID-19 pandemic.

24 February 2021 4	Shirak	0 – 0	Van	Gyumri
18:00 (UTC+4)	P.Afajanyan (yellow card) 26'; Y.Silue (yellow card) 33'	Report	Voskanyan (yellow card) 29'	Stadium: Gyumri City Stadium; Attendance: 0 Referee: Gevorg Eghoyan
Note: Match originally scheduled for 11 September, but postponed on 9 September. Match played behind closed doors due to the COVID-19 pandemic.

1 March 2021 16	Shirak	0 – 2	Pyunik	Gyumri
14:00 (UTC+4)	E.Vardanyan (yellow card) 1'; A.Gevorkyan (yellow card) 53'	Report	Tatarkov 57'; Harutyunyan (yellow card) 89'; Kozhushko 90+1'	Stadium: Gyumri Football Academy; Attendance: 0 Referee: Artur Tavakalyan
Note: Match played behind closed doors due to the COVID-19 pandemic.

7 March 2021 17	Shirak	1 – 1	Ararat-Armenia	Gyumri
14:00 (UTC+4)	E.Vardanyan (yellow card) 17'; Y.Silue (yellow card) 23' (yellow-red card) 71' (goal) 55'; V.Arzoyan (yellow card) 60'; Meneses 81' (o.g.)	Report	Sanogo 52'; Vakulenko (yellow card) 66'; Otubanjo 79' (pen.); Gouffran (yellow card) 85'	Stadium: Gyumri Football Academy; Referee: Gevorg Eghoyan

17 March 2021 18	Alashkert	0 – 0	Shirak	Yerevan
15:00 (UTC+4)	Jovanović (yellow card) 12'; Bezecourt (yellow card) 30'; Thiago Galvão (yellow card) 52'; Tiago Cametá (yellow card) 90+1'; Kadio (yellow card) 90+5'	Report	A.Sadoyan (yellow card) 25'; Ishkhanyan (yellow card) 29' (yellow-red card) 48'; Mikaelyan (yellow card) 52'; S.Urushanyan (yellow card) 68'; A.Aslanyan (yellow card) 90+1'; Stefanović (yellow card) 90+2'	Stadium: Alashkert Stadium; Referee: Vardan Manukyan

11 April 2021 19	Shirak	0 – 0	Alashkert	Gyumri
15:00 (UTC+4)	R.Mkrtchyan (yellow card) 36'; A.Aslanyan (yellow card) 69'; S.Urushanyan (yellow card) 73'	Report	Kadio (yellow card) 53'	Stadium: Gyumri City Stadium; Attendance: 70; Referee: Artem Gasparyan
Note: Match postponed on 9 April due to Alashkert being unable to travel to Gyumri due to protests, and rearranged for 11 April the following day.

15 April 2021 20	Ararat-Armenia	2 – 1	Shirak	Yerevan
15:00 (UTC+4)	Otubanjo 10'; Karapetian 16'; Ambartsumyan (yellow card) 31'; Spătaru (yellow card) 90+3'	Report	R.Mkrtchyan (yellow card) 36'; A.Sadoyan (yellow card) 64'; Stanojević 71' (pen.); A.Muradyan (yellow card) 80'; T.Diomandé (yellow card) 90+5'	Stadium: FFA Academy Stadium; Attendance: 100; Referee: Vardan Manukyan

23 April 2021 21	Shirak	1 – 2	Van	Gyumri
16:00 (UTC+4)	Stanojević 15'; J.Avo (yellow card) 34'; L.Mryan (yellow card) 75'	Report	S.Adjouman 21'; V.Ayvazyan (yellow card) 36'; A.Petrosyan (yellow card) 48'; Eza (yellow card) 62' (goal) 81' (pen.)	Stadium: Gyumri City Stadium; Attendance: 300; Referee: Zaven Hovhannisyan

23 April 2021 21	Shirak	3 – 0	Lori	Gyumri
(UTC+4)				Stadium: Gyumri City Stadium
Note: Match awarded 3-0 to Ararat-Armenia.

1 May 2021 3	Urartu	1 – 0	Shirak	Yerevan
18:30 (UTC+4)	Miranyan 27'; R.Baghramyan (red card) 58'	Report	R.Mkrtchyan (yellow card) 35'; Stanojević (yellow card) 58'; V.Arzoyan (yellow card) 66'	Stadium: Urartu Stadium; Attendance: 300; Referee: Artur Safaryan

7 May 2021 22	Shirak	1 – 1	Urartu	Gyumri
15:00 (UTC+4)	A.Aslanyan (yellow card) 63'; S.Urushanyan (yellow card) 64'; J.Avo 82'; L.Mryan (yellow card) 86'; H.Nazaryan (yellow card) 90+5'	Report	P.Mutumosi 26'	Stadium: Gyumri City Stadium; Attendance: 150; Referee: Artem Gasparyan

11 May 2021 23	Noah	3 – 0	Shirak	Yerevan
16:00 (UTC+4)	Avetisyan 6', 41'; Hovhannisyan 46'	Report	H.Nazaryan (yellow card) 75'; A.Sadoyan (red card) 90+2'	Stadium: FFA Academy Stadium; Attendance: 700; Referee: Artur Safaryan

20 May 2021 24	Shirak	1 – 5	Pyunik	Gyumri
15:30 (UTC+4)	Honchar 68' (o.g.); H.Nazaryan (yellow card) 68'	Report	Caraballo 8'; Salou (yellow card) 29'; Kozhushko 31'; Harutyunyan 42' (yellow card) 77'; A.Arakelyan (yellow card) 51'; V.Chiloyan 75'; A.Avanesyan 87'	Stadium: Gyumri Football Academy; Referee: Artur Safaryan

28 May 2021 25	Ararat Yerevan	5 – 2	Shirak	Yerevan
16:45 (UTC+4)	Z.Margaryan (yellow card) 15'; D.Pobulić 22', 43'; Zaderaka 45', 48'; M.Kone 78'	Report	R.Hakobyan 39'; A.Aslanyan 52'; A.Davoyan (yellow card) 68'; V.Arzoyan (yellow card) 90+5'	Stadium: Republican Stadium; Attendance: 200; Referee: Vardan Manukyan

==== Table ====
Pos	Team	Pld	W	D	L	GF	GA	GD	Pts	Qualification or relegation
1	Alashkert (C)	24	13	7	4	25	15	+10	46	Qualification for the Champions League first qualifying round
2	Noah	24	12	5	7	35	20	+15	41	Qualification for the Europa Conference League first qualifying round
3	Urartu	24	12	5	7	28	19	+9	41	Qualification for the Europa Conference League first qualifying round
4	Ararat (Note: Ararat qualified for Europa Conference League first qualifying round as winners of 2020–21 Armenian Cup.)	24	11	7	6	34	18	+16	40	Qualification for the Europa Conference League first qualifying round
5	Ararat-Armenia	24	10	8	6	32	17	+15	38	
6	Van	24	9	4	11	25	30	−5	31	
7	Pyunik	24	6	7	11	20	18	+2	25	
8	Lori (Note: Round 19–27 matches involving Lori were all declared 3–0 forfeits in favor of the remaining 8 teams.)	24	7	2	15	16	44	−28	23	
9	Shirak (R)	24	2	7	15	19	53	−34	13	Relegation to First League
10	Gandzasar (R, D)	0	0	0	0	0	0	0	0	Club disqualified (Note: Gandzasar were excluded from the league On 3 November, Gandzasar Kapan announced that they were withdrawing from the League and Armenian Cup due to the ongoing financial constraints relating to the ongoing COVID-19 pandemic in Armenia and the 2020 Nagorno-Karabakh conflict.)

Source: FFA Soccerway
Rules for classification: 1) Points; 2) Play-off (only if deciding champion); 3) Matches won; 4) Head-to-head points; 5) Head-to-head matches won; 6) Head-to-head goal difference; 7) Head-to-head goals scored; 8) Head-to-head away goals scored; 9) Goal difference; 10) Goals scored.
(C) Champions; (D) Disqualified; (R) Relegated

=== Armenian Cup ===
19 September 2020 First Round 1st leg	Shirak	1 – 2	Alashkert	Gyumri
16:30 (UTC+4)	A.Muradyan 4'; E.Vardanyan (yellow card) 72'; V.Arzoyan (yellow card) 72'; R.Mkrtchyan (yellow card) 80'	Report	Perdigão (yellow card) 39'; Bryan 41'; Camara 43'; Hovsepyan (yellow card) 59'; Grigoryan (yellow card) 74'; Čančarević (yellow card) 90+1'	Stadium: Gyumri City Stadium; Attendance: 150; Referee: Henrik Nalbandyan

7 November 2020 First Round 2nd leg	Alashkert	1 – 0 (3 – 1 agg.)	Shirak	Yerevan
12:00 (UTC+4)	Glišić 80'; Thiago Galvão (yellow card) 83'; Dragojević (yellow card) 85'	Report	E.Vardanyan (yellow card) 22'; V.Arzoyan (yellow card) 26'; P.Afajanyan (yellow card) 44'; A.Aslanyan (yellow card) 61'; P.Afajanyan (yellow card) 62'	Stadium: Alashkert Stadium; Attendance: 0 Referee: Vardan Manukyan

=== UEFA Europa League ===
==== Qualifying rounds ====
27 August 2020 First Qualifying Round	FCSB (Romania)	3 – 0	(Armenia) Shirak	Bucharest, Romania
22:30 (UTC+4)	Olaru 34'; Cristea (yellow card) 43'; Tănase 65' (pen.); Buziuc 83'	Report	Z.Margaryan (yellow card) 22'; Mkoyan (yellow card) 65'	Stadium: Arena Națională; Attendance: 0 Referee: Admir Šehović (Bosnia and Herzegovina)
Note: Match played behind closed doors due to the COVID-19 pandemic in Romania and as per UEFA regulations.

== Statistics ==
As of match played 28 May 2021

=== Appearances and goals ===
No.	Pos	Nat	Player	Total		Premier League		Armenian Cup		UEFA Europa League	
No.	Pos	Nat	Player	Apps	Goals	Apps	Goals	Apps	Goals	Apps	Goals
1	GK	(Armenia) ARM	Sokrat Hovhannisyan	6	0	5+1	0	0	0	0	0
2	DF	(Armenia) ARM	Robert Hakobyan	9	1	5+4	1	0	0	0	0
3	DF	(Armenia) ARM	Hovhannes Nazaryan	22	0	16+5	0	1	0	0	0
4	DF	(Armenia) ARM	Artyom Mikaelyan	17	2	16	2	1	0	0	0
5	DF	(Armenia) ARM	Hakob Vardanyan	5	0	1+3	0	0+1	0	0	0
6	MF	(Armenia) ARM	Erik Vardanyan	19	0	12+5	0	2	0	0	0
7	MF	(Armenia) ARM	Arman Aslanyan	23	2	16+4	2	2	0	1	0
8	DF	(Armenia) ARM	Hrachya Geghamyan	6	0	4+1	0	1	0	0	0
9	FW	(Armenia) ARM	Aram Muradyan	23	2	12+9	1	2	1	0	0
11	MF	(Armenia) ARM	Martin Grigoryan	18	0	4+12	0	1+1	0	0	0
17	FW	(Armenia) ARM	Arlen Tsaturyan	2	0	0+2	0	0	0	0	0
18	MF	(Armenia) ARM	Rafik Misakyan	1	0	0+1	0	0	0	0	0
19	FW	(Ivory Coast) CIV	Yacouba Silue	13	1	10+3	1	0	0	0	0
20	MF	(Armenia) ARM	Rudik Mkrtchyan	22	1	18+2	1	2	0	0	0
21	MF	(Russia) RUS	Artyom Gevorkyan	22	1	17+3	1	0+1	0	0+1	0
22	DF	(Armenia) ARM	Arsen Sadoyan	11	0	8+3	0	0	0	0	0
23	MF	(Armenia) ARM	Petros Afajanyan	15	0	10+3	0	0+2	0	0	0
25	DF	(Armenia) ARM	Aghvan Davoyan	22	0	16+3	0	2	0	1	0
26	GK	(Serbia) SRB	Spasoje Stefanović	12	0	12	0	0	0	0	0
29	MF	(Ivory Coast) CIV	Tidiane Diomandé	5	0	1+4	0	0	0	0	0
30	MF	(Armenia) ARM	Levon Darbinyan	3	0	3	0	0	0	0	0
37	DF	(Armenia) ARM	Seryozha Urushanyan	17	0	14+2	0	1	0	0	0
39	FW	(Armenia) ARM	Lyova Mryan	22	1	2+18	1	1+1	0	0	0
50	MF	(Serbia) SRB	Igor Stanojević	12	2	10+2	2	0	0	0	0
54	MF	(Armenia) ARM	Sergey Manukyan	1	0	0+1	0	0	0	0	0
55	GK	(Armenia) ARM	Lyova Karapetyan	1	0	0+1	0	0	0	0	0
89	DF	(Armenia) ARM	Hayk Ishkhanyan	11	0	11	0	0	0	0	0
95	DF	(Armenia) ARM	Vardan Arzoyan	19	0	13+4	0	2	0	0	0
99	MF	(Ivory Coast) CIV	Junior Avo Leibe	19	1	14+3	1	0+1	0	0+1	0
Players away on loan:
Players who left Shirak during the season:
2	DF	(Serbia) SRB	Marko Prljević	1	0	0	0	0	0	1	0
8	DF	(Armenia) ARM	Zhirayr Margaryan	1	0	0	0	0	0	1	0
10	MF	(Armenia) ARM	Edgar Malakyan	1	0	0	0	0	0	1	0
11	MF	(Nigeria) NGA	Solomon Udo	1	0	0	0	0	0	0+1	0
14	MF	(Armenia) ARM	Emil Yeghiazaryan	9	0	2+5	0	1+1	0	0	0
19	MF	(Armenia) ARM	Karen Muradyan	1	0	0	0	0	0	1	0
22	DF	(Armenia) ARM	Hrayr Mkoyan	1	0	0	0	0	0	1	0
26	MF	(Armenia) ARM	David Manoyan	1	0	0	0	0	0	1	0
45	GK	(Russia) RUS	Vsevolod Yermakov	1	0	0	0	0	0	1	0
70	FW	(Serbia) SRB	Uroš Nenadović	1	0	0	0	0	0	1	0
77	GK	(Armenia) ARM	Gevorg Kasparov	9	0	7	0	2	0	0	0
88	FW	(Armenia) ARM	Vardan Bakalyan	11	0	4+5	0	1+1	0	0	0
98	FW	(Ivory Coast) CIV	Mory Kone	2	0	1	0	0	0	1	0

=== Goal scorers ===
Place	Position	Nation	Number	Name	Premier League	Armenian Cup	UEFA Europa League	Total
1				Own goal	3	0	0	3
2	DF	(Armenia)	4	Artyom Mikaelyan	2	0	0	2
2	MF	(Serbia)	50	Igor Stanojević	2	0	0	2
2	MF	(Armenia)	7	Arman Aslanyan	2	0	0	2
2	FW	(Armenia)	9	Aram Muradyan	1	1	0	2
6	MF	(Armenia)	20	Rudik Mkrtchyan	1	0	0	1
6	FW	(Armenia)	39	Lyova Mryan	1	0	0	1
6	MF	(Russia)	21	Artyom Gevorkyan	1	0	0	1
6	FW	(Ivory Coast)	19	Yacouba Silue	1	0	0	1
6	MF	(Ivory Coast)	99	Junior Avo Leibe	1	0	0	1
6	DF	(Armenia)	2	Robert Hakobyan	1	0	0	1
				TOTALS	16	1	0	17

=== Clean sheets ===
Place	Position	Nation	Number	Name	Premier League	Armenian Cup	UEFA Europa League	Total
1	GK	(Serbia)	26	Spasoje Stefanović	3	0	0	3
2	GK	(Armenia)	77	Gevorg Kasparov	1	0	0	1
				TOTALS	4	0	0	4

=== Disciplinary record ===
Number	Nation	Position	Name	Premier League		Armenian Cup		UEFA Europa League		Total	
Number	Nation	Position	Name	Booked	Sent off (straight red)	Booked	Sent off (straight red)	Booked	Sent off (straight red)	Booked	Sent off (straight red)
3	(Armenia)	DF	Hovhannes Nazaryan	5	0	0	0	0	0	5	0
4	(Armenia)	DF	Artyom Mikaelyan	2	0	0	0	0	0	2	0
5	(Armenia)	DF	Hakob Vardanyan	1	0	0	0	0	0	1	0
6	(Armenia)	MF	Erik Vardanyan	3	0	2	0	0	0	5	0
7	(Armenia)	MF	Arman Aslanyan	6	0	1	0	0	0	7	0
8	(Armenia)	DF	Hrachya Geghamyan	1	0	0	0	0	0	1	0
9	(Armenia)	FW	Aram Muradyan	1	0	0	0	0	0	1	0
19	(Ivory Coast)	FW	Yacouba Silue	3	1	0	0	0	0	3	1
20	(Armenia)	MF	Rudik Mkrtchyan	6	0	1	0	0	0	7	0
21	(Russia)	MF	Artyom Gevorkyan	3	0	0	0	0	0	3	0
22	(Armenia)	DF	Arsen Sadoyan	2	1	0	0	0	0	2	1
23	(Armenia)	MF	Petros Afajanyan	3	0	1	0	0	0	4	0
25	(Armenia)	DF	Aghvan Davoyan	2	0	1	0	0	0	3	0
26	(Serbia)	GK	Spasoje Stefanović	1	0	0	0	0	0	1	0
29	(Ivory Coast)	MF	Tidiane Diomandé	1	0	0	0	0	0	1	0
37	(Armenia)	DF	Seryozha Urushanyan	4	0	0	0	0	0	4	0
39	(Armenia)	FW	Lyova Mryan	2	0	0	0	0	0	2	0
50	(Serbia)	MF	Igor Stanojević	1	0	0	0	0	0	1	0
89	(Armenia)	DF	Hayk Ishkhanyan	2	1	0	0	0	0	2	1
95	(Armenia)	DF	Vardan Arzoyan	5	0	2	0	0	0	7	0
99	(Ivory Coast)	MF	Junior Avo Leibe	1	0	0	0	0	0	1	0
Players who left Shirak during the season:
8	(Armenia)	DF	Zhirayr Margaryan	0	0	0	0	1	0	1	0
14	(Armenia)	MF	Emil Yeghiazaryan	2	0	0	0	0	0	2	0
22	(Armenia)	DF	Hrayr Mkoyan	0	0	0	0	1	0	1	0
88	(Armenia)	FW	Vardan Bakalyan	2	0	0	0	0	0	2	0
			TOTALS	59	3	8	0	2	0	69	3
