= 2020–21 FC Ararat Yerevan season =

Ararat Yerevan
2020–21 season
- Manager: Vardan Bichakhchyan
- Stadium: Hrazdan Stadium
- Premier League: 4th
- Armenian Cup: Champions
- Top goalscorer: League: Mory Kone (7); All: Mory Kone (13)
Home colours	Away colours	Third colours

The 2020–21 season was FC Ararat Yerevan's 30th consecutive season in Armenian Premier League.

== Season events ==
On 23 July, Vardan Bichakhchyan was appointed as Ararat Yerevan's manager.

On 25 July, Ararat Yerevan announced the signing of Artak Yedigaryan, and David Manoyan.

On 26 July, Ararat Yerevan announced the signing of Juan Bravo from Lori, and Karen Muradyan from Shirak.

On 27 July, Ararat Yerevan announced the double signing of Edgar Malakyan and Vsevolod Yermakov from Shirak.

On 28 July, Ararat Yerevan announced the signing of Hrayr Mkoyan from Shirak, and Christian Jiménez from Lori.

On 29 July, Ararat Yerevan announced the signing of Zhirayr Margaryan from Shirak, and Igor Stanojević from Mačva Šabac.

On 31 July, Ararat Yerevan announced the signing of Marko Prljević and Uroš Nenadović from Shirak.

On 15 August, 2 from Ararat and 6 players from Ararat-2 tested positive for COVID-19. Two days later, Ararat reported another 7 players had tested positive.

On 18 August, the FFA postponed the match between Shirak and Ararat Yerevan due to the COVID-19 outbreak within the Ararat squad.

On 25 August, summer signings from Shirak, Zhirayr Margaryan, Hrayr Mkoyan, Marko Prljević, Edgar Malakyan, David Manoyan, Karen Muradyan and Uroš Nenadović, were all loaned back to Shirak to help Shirak in their UEFA Europa League qualifying game on 27 August.

On 4 September, Ararat Yerevan announced the signing of Aghvan Papikyan from Alashkert.

On 5 September, Ararat Yerevan announced the signing of Spasoje Stefanović from Sinđelić Beograd.

On 10 September, Ararat Yerevan announced the signing of Solomon Udo and Mory Kone from Shirak.

On 18 September, the FFA postponed the match between Ararat Yerevan and Ararat-Armenia due to Ararat-Armenia being involved in a UEFA Europa League match on 24 September.

On 29 September, the season was suspended indefinitely due to the escalating 2020 Nagorno-Karabakh conflict. On 13 October, the FFA announced that the season would resume on 17 October.

On 22 October, Ararat's match against Alashkert was postponed due to 4 positive COVID-19 cases within the Alashkert team.

On 7 January, Ararat Yerevan announced the signing of Artur Danielyan from Ararat-Armenia on a free transfer, with Grigor Meliksetyan joining the following day after leaving of Gandzasar Kapan.

On 15 January, Ararat Yerevan announced that they had terminated their contract with Spasoje Stefanović by mutual consent, with Dimitrije Pobulić signing the following day from Grafičar Beograd.

On 4 February, Ararat Yerevan announced the signing of Maksym Zaderaka from Oleksandriya.

On 17 February, Vahe Muradyan and Robert Marutyan left Ararat Yerevan.

On 22 February, Solomon Udo left Ararat Yerevan to sign for Shakhter Karagandy.

On 16 March, Lori walked off at the start of their match against Ararat Yerevan in protest of their Matchday 1 fixture being awarded to Urartu after Lori where unable to field a team due to COVID-19. With the match later being awarded to Ararat Yerevan 3–0.

== Squad ==
As of match played 28 May 2021

Number	Name	Nationality	Position	Date of birth (age)	Signed from	Signed in	Contract ends	Apps.	Goals
Goalkeepers
1	Poghos Ayvazyan	(Armenia)	GK	9 June 1995 (aged 25)	Mika	2016		21	0
33	Grigor Meliksetyan	(Armenia)	GK	18 August 1986 (aged 34)	Gandzasar Kapan	2021		1	0
45	Vsevolod Yermakov	(Russia)	GK	6 January 1996 (aged 25)	Shirak	2020		27	0
Defenders
2	Christian Jiménez	(Spain)	DF	4 July 1996 (aged 24)	Lori	2020		15	0
4	Yuri Magakyan	(Armenia)	DF	22 June 2000 (aged 20)	Youth team	2016		1	0
5	Hrayr Mkoyan	(Armenia)	DF	2 September 1986 (aged 34)	Shirak	2020			
7	Aleksandre Saganelidze	(Georgia (country))	DF	9 August 1999 (aged 21)	Unattached	2021		1	0
8	Zhirayr Margaryan	(Armenia)	DF	13 September 1997 (aged 23)	Shirak	2020		23	0
22	Artur Danielyan	(Armenia)	DF	9 February 1998 (aged 23)	Ararat-Armenia	2021		9	0
23	Ivan Spychka	(Ukraine)	DF	18 January 1991 (aged 30)	Ararat Moscow	2019		38	1
29	Marko Prljević	(Serbia)	DF	2 August 1988 (aged 32)	Shirak	2020		26	2
44	Juan Bravo	(Colombia)	DF	1 April 1990 (aged 31)	Sportivo Barracas	2020		24	2
Midfielders
7	Aghvan Papikyan	(Armenia)	MF	8 February 1994 (aged 27)	Alashkert	2020		23	2
10	Zaven Badoyan	(Armenia)	MF	22 December 1989 (aged 31)	Shabab Al Sahel	2018		74	10
11	David Manoyan	(Armenia)	MF	5 July 1990 (aged 30)	Shirak	2020		28	1
16	Serob Galstyan	(Armenia)	MF	23 September 2002 (aged 18)	Torpedo Yerevan	2020		1	0
17	Artak Yedigaryan	(Armenia)	MF	18 March 1990 (aged 31)	Pyunik	2020		22	0
18	Edgar Malakyan	(Armenia)	MF	22 September 1990 (aged 30)	Shirak	2020		18	3
19	Karen Muradyan	(Armenia)	MF	1 November 1992 (aged 28)	Shirak	2020		28	0
27	David Khurtsidze	(Russia)	MF	4 July 1993 (aged 27)	Ararat Moscow	2019		56	8
31	David Baghdasaryan	(Armenia)	MF	8 March 1998 (aged 23)	Pyunik	2019		3	0
55	Dimitrije Pobulić	(Serbia)	MF	10 May 1994 (aged 27)	Grafičar Beograd	2021		17	4
77	Grigor Muradyan	(Armenia)	MF	6 August 2002 (aged 18)	Youth team	2020		3	0
80	Seroj Titizian	(Russia)	MF	1 February 2000 (aged 21)	Sarreguemines	2020		5	0
94	Maksym Zaderaka	(Ukraine)	MF	7 August 2001 (aged 19)	Oleksandriya	2021		14	3
	Andranik Hovhannisyan	(Armenia)	MF	14 April 1999 (aged 22)	Youth Team	2016		1	0
	Karen Shirkhanyan	(Armenia)	MF	6 April 2000 (aged 21)	Youth Team	2019		4	0
	Arame Tsaturyan	(Armenia)	MF	7 August 2001 (aged 19)	Youth Team	2018		0	0
Forwards
9	Razmik Hakobyan	(Armenia)	FW	9 February 1996 (aged 25)	Alashkert	2018		20	1
70	Uroš Nenadović	(Serbia)	FW	28 January 1994 (aged 27)	Shirak	2020		23	9
98	Mory Kone	(Ivory Coast)	FW	13 July 1995 (aged 25)	Shirak	2020		28	13
Away on loan
Left during the season
4	Vahe Muradyan	(Armenia)	DF	28 January 1998 (aged 23)	Pyunik	2020		2	0
6	Ruslan Avagyan	(Armenia)	MF	24 June 1995 (aged 25)	Youth Team	2016		56	1
12	Solomon Udo	(Armenia)	MF	15 July 1995 (aged 25)	Shirak	2020		11	0
22	Igor Stanojević	(Serbia)	MF	24 October 1991 (aged 29)	Mačva Šabac	2020		10	1
30	Spasoje Stefanović	(Serbia)	GK	12 October 1992 (aged 28)	Sinđelić Beograd	2020		2	0
	Aleksandr Kozlov	(Russia)	MF	19 March 1993 (aged 28)	Ararat Moscow	2019		20	4
	Ramazan Isayev	(Russia)	FW	17 January 1998 (aged 23)	FC Yerevan	2020		9	1

=== Left club during season ===
Note: Flags indicate national team as defined under FIFA eligibility rules; some limited exceptions apply. Players may hold more than one non-FIFA nationality.

No.	Pos.	Nation	Player
6	MF	ARM	Ruslan Avagyan (to West Armenia)
30	GK	SRB	Spasoje Stefanović (to Shirak)
—	MF	RUS	Aleksandr Kozlov
—	FW	RUS	Ramazan Isayev (to Legion Dynamo Makhachkala)

== Transfers ==
=== In ===
Date	Position	Nationality	Name	From	Fee	Ref.
25 July 2020	MF	(Armenia)	Artak Yedigaryan	Pyunik	Undisclosed	
25 July 2020	MF	(Armenia)	David Manoyan	Shirak	Undisclosed	
26 July 2020	DF	(Colombia)	Juan Bravo	Lori	Undisclosed	
26 July 2020	MF	(Armenia)	Karen Muradyan	Shirak	Undisclosed	
27 July 2020	GK	(Russia)	Vsevolod Yermakov	Shirak	Undisclosed	
27 July 2020	MF	(Armenia)	Edgar Malakyan	Shirak	Undisclosed	
28 July 2020	DF	(Armenia)	Hrayr Mkoyan	Shirak	Undisclosed	
28 July 2020	DF	(Spain)	Christian Jiménez	Lori	Undisclosed	
29 July 2020	DF	(Armenia)	Zhirayr Margaryan	Shirak	Undisclosed	
29 July 2020	MF	(Serbia)	Igor Stanojević	Mačva Šabac	Undisclosed	
31 July 2020	DF	(Serbia)	Marko Prljević	Shirak	Undisclosed	
31 July 2020	FW	(Serbia)	Uroš Nenadović	Shirak	Undisclosed	
4 September 2020	MF	(Armenia)	Aghvan Papikyan	Alashkert	Undisclosed	
5 September 2020	FW	(Serbia)	Spasoje Stefanović	Sinđelić Beograd	Undisclosed	
10 September 2020	MF	(Armenia)	Solomon Udo	Shirak	Undisclosed	
10 September 2020	FW	(Ivory Coast)	Mory Kone	Shirak	Undisclosed	
7 January 2021	DF	(Armenia)	Artur Danielyan	Ararat-Armenia	Free	
8 January 2021	GK	(Armenia)	Grigor Meliksetyan	Gandzasar Kapan	Free	
16 January 2021	MF	(Serbia)	Dimitrije Pobulić	Grafičar Beograd	Undisclosed	
4 February 2021	MF	(Ukraine)	Maksym Zaderaka	Oleksandriya	Undisclosed	
1 April 2021	DF	(Georgia (country))	Aleksandre Saganelidze	Unattached	Free	

=== Out ===
Date	Position	Nationality	Name	To	Fee	Ref.
28 August 2020	FW	(Russia)	Ramazan Isayev	Legion Dynamo Makhachkala	Undisclosed	
22 February 2021	MF	(Armenia)	Solomon Udo	Shakhter Karagandy	Undisclosed	

=== Loans out ===
Start date	Position	Nationality	Name	To	End date	Ref.
25 August 2020	DF	(Armenia)	Zhirayr Margaryan	Shirak	Short-term	
25 August 2020	DF	(Armenia)	Hrayr Mkoyan	Shirak	Short-term	
25 August 2020	DF	(Serbia)	Marko Prljević	Shirak	Short-term	
25 August 2020	MF	(Armenia)	Edgar Malakyan	Shirak	Short-term	
25 August 2020	MF	(Armenia)	David Manoyan	Shirak	Short-term	
25 August 2020	MF	(Armenia)	Karen Muradyan	Shirak	Short-term	
25 August 2020	FW	(Serbia)	Uroš Nenadović	Shirak	Short-term	

=== Released ===
Date	Position	Nationality	Name	Joined	Date	Ref
1 August 2020	GK	(Russia)	Sergei Revyakin	Aktobe	14 April 2021	
9 August 2020	GK	(Russia)	Yevgeni Kobozev	Luki-Energiya Velikiye Luki	23 July 2021	
9 August 2020	DF	(Russia)	Arkadi Kalaydzhyan			
9 August 2020	DF	(Russia)	Yevgeni Makeyev	Rosich	23 September 2020	
9 August 2020	FW	(Russia)	Georgy Chelidze	Zenit-2 St.Petersburg	18 September 2020	
23 October 2020	MF	(Russia)	Aleksandr Kozlov	Kafa Feodosia		
15 January 2021	GK	(Serbia)	Spasoje Stefanović	Shirak	16 January 2021	
19 January 2021	MF	(Armenia)	Ruslan Avagyan	West Armenia		
3 February 2021	MF	(Serbia)	Igor Stanojević	Shirak	4 February 2021	
17 February 2021	DF	(Armenia)	Robert Marutyan			
17 February 2021	DF	(Armenia)	Vahe Muradyan			

== Friendlies ==
1 August 2020	Shirak	2 – 7	Ararat Yerevan	Gyumri
12:00 (UTC+4)	A.Aslanyan; A.Muradyan	Report	K.Muradyan; Kozlov; G.Muradyan; R.Hakobyan; D.Baghdasaryan	Stadium: Gyumri City Stadium

8 August 2020	Ararat Yerevan	1 – 0	Gandzasar Kapan	Yerevan
11:00 (UTC+4)	Khurtsidze 67'	Report		Stadium: Yerevan Football Academy

5 September 2020	Pyunik	0 – 2	Ararat Yerevan	Yerevan
13:30 (UTC+4)		Report	Nenadović; Papikyan	Stadium: Football Academy Stadium

23 January 2021	Ararat Yerevan	1 – 1	Urartu	Yerevan
13:00 (UTC+4)	Z.Magakyan 57'	Report	Kobzar 47'

30 January 2021	Atletico Arabia (United Arab Emirates)	1 – 7	(Armenia) Ararat Yerevan	Sharjah, United Arab Emirates
19:30 (UTC+4)	Goal	Report	Malakyan 6'; M.Kone 8', 19', 52'; Nenadović 31'; S.Titizian 75'; Badoyan 87'	Stadium: Sharjah Stadium

2 February 2021	Liwa (United Arab Emirates)	1 – 4	(Armenia) Ararat Yerevan	Dubai, United Arab Emirates
(UTC+4)	Goal	Report	21' (o.g.); D.Pobulić 28'; Nenadović 65', 70'	Stadium: Dubai Sports Center

6 February 2021	Rodina Moscow (Russia)	0 – 4	(Armenia) Ararat Yerevan	Dubai, United Arab Emirates
(UTC+4)		Report	Yedigaryan 28'; Malakyan 36'; Zaderaka 65', 70'	Stadium: JA Shooting Club

11 February 2021	Fursan Hispania (United Arab Emirates)	0 – 4	(Armenia) Ararat Yerevan	Dubai, United Arab Emirates
(UTC+4)		Report	D.Pobulić 38', 47'; Zaderaka 38'; Malakyan 63'	Stadium: Dubai Sports Center

27 March 2021	Shirak	0 – 3	Ararat Yerevan	Gyumri
(UTC+4)		Report	M.Kone 56'; D.Pobulić 78', 83'	Stadium: Gyumri City Stadium

== Competitions ==
=== Premier League ===
==== Results summary ====
Overall								Home						Away					
Pld	W	D	L	GF	GA	GD	Pts	W	D	L	GF	GA	GD	W	D	L	GF	GA	GD
24	11	7	6	34	18	+16	40	7	3	2	22	7	+15	4	4	4	12	11	+1

Last updated: 28 May 2021.
Source: See Results

==== Results by round ====
Round	1	2	3	4	5	6	7	8	9	10	11	12	13	14	15	16	17	18	19	20	21	22	23	24	25
Ground	H	A	A	-	A	A	H	A	H	A	A	H	H	H	H	A	H	A	A	H	H	A	A	H	H
Result	W	L	W	-	L	D	W	W	D	D	W	W	W	D	W	L	L	W	D	D	W	D	L	L	W
Position	5	5	5	-	4	2	3	3	3	2	1	1	1	1	1	2	2	1	3	3	3	3	5	5	3

Updated to match(es) played on 28 May 2021. Source: See Results
A = Away; H = Home; W = Win; D = Draw; L = Loss

==== Results ====
16 August 2020 1	Ararat Yerevan	1 – 0	Pyunik	Yerevan
19:30 (UTC+4)	Z.Margaryan (yellow card) 67'; Nenadović 89'	Report	A.Yeoule (yellow card) 49'	Stadium: Republican Stadium; Attendance: 0 Referee: Ashot Ghaltakchyan
Note: Match played behind closed doors due to the COVID-19 pandemic.

11 September 2020 4	Noah	2 – 1	Ararat Yerevan	Yerevan
16:45 (UTC+4)	H.Manga (yellow card) 45'; Lavrishchev (yellow card) 72'; Simonyan 86', 89' (pen.)	Report	Mkoyan (yellow card) 19'; K.Muradyan (yellow card) 39'; Khurtsidze 52'; Spychka (yellow card) 62'	Stadium: Alashkert Stadium; Attendance: 0 Referee: Ashot Ghaltakchyan
Note: Match played behind closed doors due to the COVID-19 pandemic.

26 September 2020 2	Shirak	0 – 3	Ararat Yerevan	Gyumri
16:15 (UTC+4)	V.Bakalyan (yellow card) 79'	Report	Papikyan 15' (yellow card) 24'; Manoyan 76'; Nenadović 88'	Stadium: Gyumri City Stadium; Attendance: 0 Referee: Artush Kerobyan
Note: Match postponed on 18 August. Match played behind closed doors due to the COVID-19 pandemic.

18 October 2020 8	Ararat Yerevan	2 – 1	Gandzasar Kapan	Yerevan
18:30 (UTC+4)	Manoyan (yellow card) 15'; M.Kone 39'; V.Yermakov (yellow card) 85'; Prljević (yellow card) 89'; Malakyan 90+3'	Report	D.Terteryan (yellow card) 45'; V.Minasyan (yellow card) 72'; Wbeymar 86' (pen.)	Stadium: Republican Stadium; Attendance: 0 Referee: Artem Gasparyan
Note: Match played behind closed doors due to the COVID-19 pandemic. Match annulled after Gandzasar Kapan dropped out of the league.

26 October 2020 9	Lori	1 – 0	Ararat Yerevan	Vanadzor
15:30 (UTC+4)	A.Kocharyan (yellow card) 37'; Alexis 60'; Gomelko (yellow card) 77'; A.Yeghiazaryan (yellow card) 90'	Report	M.Kone (yellow card) 37'; Udo (yellow card) 54'; Spychka (yellow card) 70'	Stadium: Vanadzor Football Academy; Attendance: 0 Referee: Shahen Aghayan
Note: Match played behind closed doors due to the COVID-19 pandemic.

31 October 2020 10	Pyunik	1 – 1	Ararat Yerevan	Yerevan
18:00 (UTC+4)	A.Avanesyan (yellow card) 54'; Kobyalko (yellow card) 61'; A.Nahapetyan 87'	Report	Khurtsidze (yellow card) 42' (goal) 81'	Stadium: Republican Stadium; Attendance: 0 Referee: Zaven Hovhannisyan
Note: Match played behind closed doors due to the COVID-19 pandemic.

3 November 2020 11	Ararat Yerevan	4 – 0	Shirak	Yerevan
19:00 (UTC+4)	Stanojević 11'; M.Kone 22'; J.Bravo 41'; C.Jiménez (yellow card) 90'; Badoyan 90+2'	Report	E.Yeghiazaryan (yellow card) 27'; H.Vardanyan (yellow card) 49'; R.Mkrtchyan (yellow card) 56'	Stadium: Republican Stadium; Attendance: 0 Referee: Shahen Aghayan
Note: Match played behind closed doors due to the COVID-19 pandemic.

21 November 2020 12	Alashkert	1 – 2	Ararat Yerevan	Yerevan
14:30 (UTC+4)	Voskanyan 55'; Gome (yellow card) 61'; Tomić (yellow card) 73'; Grigoryan (yellow card) 86'; Thiago Galvão (yellow card) 89'	Report	Nenadović 22'; Mkoyan (red card) 29'; M.Kone 50' (pen.); Udo (yellow card) 70'; V.Yermakov (yellow card) 90+4'	Stadium: Alashkert Stadium; Attendance: 0 Referee: Zaven Hovhannisyan
Note: Match played behind closed doors due to the COVID-19 pandemic.

27 November 2020 13	Ararat Yerevan	1 – 1	Noah	Yerevan
18:00 (UTC+4)	Nenadović 83'	Report	Simonyan 22'; Mayrovich (yellow card) 71'	Stadium: Republican Stadium; Attendance: 0 Referee: Henrik Nalbandyan
Note: Match played behind closed doors due to the COVID-19 pandemic.

2 December 2020 14	Ararat-Armenia	0 – 0	Ararat Yerevan	Yerevan
14:30 (UTC+4)	Alemão (yellow card) 86'	Report	J.Bravo (yellow card) 10'; K.Muradyan (yellow card) 21'	Stadium: FFA Academy Stadium; Attendance: 0 Referee: Shahen Aghayan
Note: Match played behind closed doors due to the COVID-19 pandemic.

10 December 2020 7	Van	0 – 1	Ararat Yerevan	Charentsavan
14:00 (UTC+4)	Ebert (yellow card) 39'	Report	Nenadović 40'; Badoyan (yellow card) 90'; V.Yermakov (yellow card) 90'	Stadium: Charentsavan City Stadium; Attendance: 0 Referee: Henrik Nalbandyan
Note: Match played behind closed doors due to the COVID-19 pandemic.

21 February 2021 6	Ararat Yerevan	2 – 0	Urartu	Charentsavan
14:00 (UTC+4)	M.Kone 45', 65'; Malakyan (red card) 78'	Report	Vitinho (yellow card) 60'	Stadium: Charentsavan City Stadium; Attendance: 0 Referee: Henrik Nalbandyan
Note: Match played behind closed doors due to the COVID-19 pandemic.

25 February 2021 5	Ararat Yerevan	1 – 0	Ararat-Armenia	Charentsavan
15:00 (UTC+4)	J.Bravo (yellow card) 45'; D.Pobulić 72'	Report	Sanogo (yellow card) 17'	Stadium: Charentsavan City Stadium; Attendance: 0 Referee: Zaven Hovhannisyan
Note: Match originally scheduled for 22 September but postponed on 18 September. Match played behind closed doors due to the COVID-19 pandemic.

1 March 2021 16	Ararat Yerevan	1 – 1	Van	Yerevan
15:30 (UTC+4)		Report	Avagyan (red card) 76'; D.Nalbandyan (yellow card) 90+6'	Stadium: Republican Stadium; Attendance: 100; Referee: Zaven Hovhannisyan

16 March 2021 18	Ararat Yerevan	3 – 0	Lori	Yerevan
18:00 (UTC+4)		Report		Stadium: Republican Stadium
Note: Match abandoned after Lori walked off the pitch at the start of the game, and later awarded as a 3-0 technical victory to Ararat Yerevan.

7 April 2021 19	Urartu	1 – 0	Ararat Yerevan	Yerevan
18:00 (UTC+4)	Désiré 48'; Paramonov (yellow card) 53'	Report	J.Bravo (yellow card) 50'	Stadium: Urartu Stadium; Attendance: 1,000; Referee: Zaven Hovhannisyan

15 April 2021 20	Ararat Yerevan	2 – 3	Noah	Yerevan
18:00 (UTC+4)	J.Bravo 2'; M.Kone 16' (yellow card) 45'; Mkoyan (yellow card) 81'	Report	Emsis 18' (yellow card) 26'; Avetisyan 25'; Hovhannisyan (yellow card) 45'; Kovalenko (yellow card) 45'; Kireyenko 74'; Velemir (yellow card) 90'; Kryuchkov (yellow card) 90'	Stadium: Republican Stadium; Referee: Zaven Hovhannisyan

25 April 2021 21	Pyunik	1 – 2	Ararat Yerevan	Yerevan
16:00 (UTC+4)	J.Balza 17'; Kozhushko (yellow card) 89'; Ibarra (yellow card) 90'	Report	Honchar 35' (o.g.); Nenadović 54'; Khurtsidze (yellow card) 88'; Malakyan (yellow card) 90'	Stadium: Republican Stadium; Attendance: 1,200; Referee: Artur Safaryan

5 May 2021 22	Van	1 – 1	Ararat Yerevan	Charentsavan
16:00 (UTC+4)	E.Essien (yellow card) 26'; Eza 41'; S.Agamagomedov (yellow card) 66'; D.Dosa (yellow card) 67'	Report	Nenadović 21'; Khurtsidze (yellow card) 60'	Stadium: Charentsavan City Stadium; Attendance: 300; Referee: Henrik Nalbandyan

10 May 2021 23	Ararat Yerevan	0 – 0	Alashkert	Yerevan
19:00 (UTC+4)	Malakyan (yellow card) 51'	Report	Hovsepyan (yellow card) 61'; Bezecourt (yellow card) 71'; Tiago Cametá (yellow card) 75'; Jovanović (red card) 79'; Voskanyan (yellow card) 84'	Stadium: Republican Stadium; Attendance: 700; Referee: Henrik Nalbandyan

18 May 2021 17	Ararat Yerevan	3 – 0	Lori	Yerevan
12:00 (UTC+4)				Stadium: Republican Stadium
Note: Match awarded as a 3-0 technical victory to Ararat Yerevan.

19 May 2021 24	Ararat-Armenia	1 – 1	Ararat Yerevan	Yerevan
15:30 (UTC+4)	Sanogo (yellow card) 8'; A.Nahapetyan (yellow card) 73'; Karapetian 74'	Report	Nenadović (yellow card) 13'; Zaderaka 42' (yellow card) 54'	Stadium: FFA Academy Stadium; Attendance: 1,000; Referee: Zaven Hovhannisyan

22 May 2021 15	Urartu	2 – 0	Ararat Yerevan	Yerevan
19:30 (UTC+4)	Paramonov 33'; Miranyan 68'; Ten (yellow card) 78'; James (yellow card) 83'	Report	Z.Margaryan (yellow card) 90+4'	Stadium: Urartu Stadium; Attendance: 1,000; Referee: Artem Gasparyan

25 May 2021 3	Ararat Yerevan	0 – 1	Alashkert	Yerevan
19:30 (UTC+4)	Mkoyan (yellow card) 69'	Report	Grigoryan (yellow card) 40'; Bezecourt 75'; Čančarević (yellow card) 90+1'	Stadium: Republican Stadium; Attendance: 500; Referee: Artem Gasparyan
Note: Match originally scheduled for 22 October, but postponed on 22 October due to the COVID-19 pandemic.

28 May 2021 25	Ararat Yerevan	5 – 2	Shirak	Yerevan
16:45 (UTC+4)	Z.Margaryan (yellow card) 15'; D.Pobulić 22', 43'; Zaderaka 45', 48'; M.Kone 78'	Report	R.Hakobyan 39'; A.Aslanyan 52'; A.Davoyan (yellow card) 68'; V.Arzoyan (yellow card) 90+5'	Stadium: Republican Stadium; Attendance: 200; Referee: Vardan Manukyan

==== Table ====
Pos	Team	Pld	W	D	L	GF	GA	GD	Pts	Qualification or relegation
1	Alashkert (C)	24	13	7	4	25	15	+10	46	Qualification for the Champions League first qualifying round
2	Noah	24	12	5	7	35	20	+15	41	Qualification for the Europa Conference League first qualifying round
3	Urartu	24	12	5	7	28	19	+9	41	Qualification for the Europa Conference League first qualifying round
4	Ararat (Note: Ararat qualified for Europa Conference League first qualifying round as winners of 2020–21 Armenian Cup.)	24	11	7	6	34	18	+16	40	Qualification for the Europa Conference League first qualifying round
5	Ararat-Armenia	24	10	8	6	32	17	+15	38	
6	Van	24	9	4	11	25	30	−5	31	
7	Pyunik	24	6	7	11	20	18	+2	25	
8	Lori (Note: Round 19–27 matches involving Lori were all declared 3–0 forfeits in favor of the remaining 8 teams.)	24	7	2	15	16	44	−28	23	
9	Shirak (R)	24	2	7	15	19	53	−34	13	Relegation to First League
10	Gandzasar (R, D)	0	0	0	0	0	0	0	0	Club disqualified (Note: Gandzasar were excluded from the league On 3 November, Gandzasar Kapan announced that they were withdrawing from the League and Armenian Cup due to the ongoing financial constraints relating to the ongoing COVID-19 pandemic in Armenia and the 2020 Nagorno-Karabakh conflict.)

Source: FFA Soccerway
Rules for classification: 1) Points; 2) Play-off (only if deciding champion); 3) Matches won; 4) Head-to-head points; 5) Head-to-head matches won; 6) Head-to-head goal difference; 7) Head-to-head goals scored; 8) Head-to-head away goals scored; 9) Goal difference; 10) Goals scored.
(C) Champions; (D) Disqualified; (R) Relegated

=== Armenian Cup ===
19 September 2020 First Round 1st leg	Ararat Yerevan	3 – 0	Sevan	Yerevan
19:30 (UTC+4)	M.Kone 2', 90+4'; Khurtsidze 28'; Yedigaryan (yellow card) 43'; Mkoyan (yellow card) 77'; Badoyan (yellow card) 85'	Report	H.Loretsyan (yellow card) 4'; D.Eloev (yellow card) 48'; A.Loretsyan (yellow card) 84'	Stadium: Yerevan Football Academy Stadium; Attendance: 150; Referee: Artush Kerobyan

7 November 2020 First Round 2nd leg	Sevan	1 – 3 (1 – 6 agg.)	Ararat Yerevan	Yerevan
12:30 (UTC+4)	A.Azatyan (yellow card) 30'; M.Sahakyan 83'	Report	M.Kone 8', 69'; Malakyan 79'	Stadium: RCCSD Stadium; Attendance: 0 Referee: Henrik Nalbandyan

11 March 2021 Quarterfinal 1st leg	West Armenia	2 – 0	Ararat Yerevan	Vagharshapat
14:00 (UTC+4)	Charles Ikechukwu 22'; Orlov 24'; Hakob Loretsyan (yellow card) 84'	Report		Stadium: Vagharshapat Football Academy; Attendance: 40; Referee: Artur Safaryan

3 April 2021 Quarterfinal 2nd leg	Ararat Yerevan	5 – 1 (5 – 3 agg.)	West Armenia	Yerevan
18:00 (UTC+4)	Khurtsidze 19'; Malakyan 28' (yellow card) 81'; Prljević (yellow card) 57' (goal) 79'; D.Pobulić 64'; Badoyan (yellow card) 86' (goal) 88'; Zaderaka (yellow card) 89'	Report	C.Ikechukwu (yellow card) 23'; V.Kharatyan (yellow card) 63'; Dzhigkayev 71'; K.Manukyan (yellow card) 72'; V.Chopuryan (yellow card) 83'	Stadium: Republican Stadium; Attendance: 250; Referee: Zaven Hovhannisyan

20 April 2021 Semifinal 1st leg	Ararat Yerevan	2 – 0	Ararat-Armenia	Yerevan
18:30 (UTC+4)	Nenadović 18'; Prljević 48'; Malakyan (yellow card) 55'; D.Pobulić (yellow card) 89'	Report	Wbeymar (yellow card) 36'; Otubanjo (yellow card) 53'	Stadium: Republican Stadium; Attendance: 400; Referee: Artem Gasparyan

1 May 2021 Semifinal 2nd leg	Ararat-Armenia	2 – 1 (2 – 3 agg.)	Ararat Yerevan	Yerevan
15:00 (UTC+4)	Gouffran 23'; Otubanjo (yellow card) 45'; D.Terteryan 78' (yellow card) 90'	Report	Z.Margaryan (yellow card) 56'; Nenadović 72'; Mkoyan (yellow card) 77'	Stadium: FFA Academy Stadium; Attendance: 400; Referee: Zaven Hovhannisyan

==== Final ====
15 May 2021	Alashkert	1 – 3	Ararat Yerevan	Yerevan
19:00 (UTC+4)	Kadio (yellow card) 47'; Aghekyan (yellow card) 65'; M.Manasyan 85' (yellow card) 90+2'; Hovsepyan (red card) 90'	Report	Papikyan 12'; M.Kone 19', 55'; Prljević (yellow card) 49'	Stadium: Republican Stadium; Attendance: 4,000

== Statistics ==
As of match played 28 May 2021

=== Appearances and goals ===
No.	Pos	Nat	Player	Total		Premier League		Armenian Cup	
No.	Pos	Nat	Player	Apps	Goals	Apps	Goals	Apps	Goals
1	GK	(Armenia) ARM	Poghos Ayvazyan	1	0	1	0	0	0
2	DF	(Spain) ESP	Christian Jiménez	15	0	6+3	0	6	0
4	DF	(Armenia) ARM	Yuri Magakyan	1	0	0+1	0	0	0
5	DF	(Armenia) ARM	Hrayr Mkoyan	24	0	18+1	0	5	0
7	MF	(Armenia) ARM	Aghvan Papikyan	23	2	15+3	1	3+2	1
7	DF	(Georgia (country)) GEO	Aleksandr Saganelidze	1	0	0+1	0	0	0
8	DF	(Armenia) ARM	Zhirayr Margaryan	23	0	19+1	0	3	0
9	FW	(Armenia) ARM	Razmik Hakobyan	6	0	1+4	0	0+1	0
10	MF	(Armenia) ARM	Zaven Badoyan	19	2	1+14	1	2+2	1
11	MF	(Armenia) ARM	David Manoyan	28	1	14+7	1	3+4	0
16	MF	(Armenia) ARM	Serob Galstyan	1	0	0+1	0	0	0
17	MF	(Armenia) ARM	Artak Yedigaryan	22	0	7+10	0	4+1	0
18	MF	(Armenia) ARM	Edgar Malakyan	18	3	10+3	1	4+1	2
19	MF	(Armenia) ARM	Karen Muradyan	28	0	22	0	6	0
22	DF	(Armenia) ARM	Artur Danielyan	9	0	3+2	0	2+2	0
23	DF	(Ukraine) UKR	Ivan Spychka	12	0	8+1	0	3	0
27	MF	(Russia) RUS	David Khurtsidze	29	4	20+2	2	5+2	2
29	DF	(Serbia) SRB	Marko Prljevic	26	2	18+2	0	5+1	2
44	DF	(Colombia) COL	Juan Bravo	24	2	17+2	2	4+1	0
45	GK	(Russia) RUS	Vsevolod Yermakov	27	0	22	0	5	0
55	MF	(Serbia) SRB	Dimitrije Pobulić	17	4	5+7	3	2+3	1
70	FW	(Serbia) SRB	Uros Nenadovic	23	11	16+2	7	3+2	4
77	MF	(Armenia) ARM	Grigor Muradyan	2	0	0+1	0	0+1	0
80	MF	(Russia) RUS	Seroj Titizian	5	0	1+3	0	0+1	0
94	MF	(Ukraine) UKR	Maksym Zaderaka	14	3	5+5	3	1+3	0
98	FW	(Ivory Coast) CIV	Mory Kone	28	13	16+6	7	5+1	6
Players who left Ararat Yerevan during the season:
4	DF	(Armenia) ARM	Vahe Muradyan	1	0	0+1	0	0	0
12	MF	(Armenia) ARM	Solomon Udo	11	0	4+5	0	2	0
22	MF	(Serbia) SRB	Igor Stanojević	10	1	4+4	1	2	0
30	GK	(Serbia) SRB	Spasoje Stefanović	2	0	0	0	2	0

=== Goal scorers ===
Place	Position	Nation	Number	Name	Premier League	Armenian Cup	Total
1	FW	(Ivory Coast)	98	Mory Kone	7	6	13
2	FW	(Serbia)	70	Uros Nenadovic	7	2	9
3	MF	(Serbia)	55	Dimitrije Pobulić	3	1	4
3	MF	(Russia)	27	David Khurtsidze	2	2	4
5	MF	(Ukraine)	94	Maksym Zaderaka	3	0	3
5	MF	(Armenia)	18	Edgar Malakyan	1	2	3
7	DF	(Colombia)	44	Juan Bravo	2	0	2
7	MF	(Armenia)	10	Zaven Badoyan	1	1	2
7	MF	(Armenia)	7	Aghvan Papikyan	1	1	2
7	DF	(Serbia)	29	Marko Prljevic	0	2	2
11	MF	(Armenia)	11	David Manoyan	1	0	1
11	MF	(Serbia)	22	Igor Stanojević	1	0	1
11				Own goal	1	0	1
				Awarded	3	0	3
				TOTALS	33	17	50

=== Clean sheets ===
Place	Position	Nation	Number	Name	Premier League	Armenian Cup	Total
1	GK	(Russia)	45	Vsevolod Yermakov	9	1	10
2	GK	(Serbia)	30	Spasoje Stefanović	0	1	1
				TOTALS	9	2	11

=== Disciplinary record ===
Number	Nation	Position	Name	Premier League		Armenian Cup		Total	
Number	Nation	Position	Name	Booked	Sent off (straight red)	Booked	Sent off (straight red)	Booked	Sent off (straight red)
2	(Spain)	DF	Christian Jiménez	1	0	0	0	1	0
5	(Armenia)	DF	Hrayr Mkoyan	3	1	2	0	5	1
7	(Armenia)	MF	Aghvan Papikyan	1	0	0	0	1	0
8	(Armenia)	DF	Zhirayr Margaryan	3	0	1	0	4	0
10	(Armenia)	MF	Zaven Badoyan	1	0	2	0	3	0
11	(Armenia)	MF	David Manoyan	1	0	0	0	1	0
17	(Armenia)	MF	Artak Yedigaryan	0	0	1	0	1	0
18	(Armenia)	MF	Edgar Malakyan	2	1	2	0	4	1
19	(Armenia)	MF	Karen Muradyan	2	0	0	0	2	0
23	(Ukraine)	DF	Ivan Spychka	2	0	0	0	2	0
27	(Russia)	MF	David Khurtsidze	3	0	0	0	3	0
29	(Serbia)	DF	Marko Prljević	1	0	2	0	3	0
44	(Colombia)	DF	Juan Bravo	2	0	0	0	2	0
45	(Russia)	GK	Vsevolod Yermakov	4	0	0	0	4	0
55	(Serbia)	MF	Dimitrije Pobulić	0	0	1	0	1	0
70	(Serbia)	FW	Uros Nenadovic	1	0	0	0	1	0
94	(Ukraine)	MF	Maksym Zaderaka	1	0	1	0	2	0
98	(Ivory Coast)	FW	Mory Kone	2	0	0	0	2	0
Players who left Ararat Yerevan during the season:
12	(Armenia)	MF	Solomon Udo	2	0	0	0	2	0
			TOTALS	32	2	12	0	44	2
