= Solomon Udo =

Footballer (born 1995)

Personal information
- Full name: Solomon Ime Udo
- Date of birth: 15 July 1995 (age 31)
- Place of birth: Ikot Ekpene, Akwa Ibom State, Nigeria
- Height: 1.82 m (6 ft 0 in)
- Position: Defensive midfielder

Team information
- Current team: Al-Minaa
- Number: 18

Youth career
- –2013: Aspire Academy Senegal

Senior career*
| Years | Team | Apps | (Gls) |
| 2013–2014 | Eupen | 0 | (0) |
| 2015 | Ararat Yerevan | 0 | (0) |
| 2015–2016 | Ulisses | 12 | (0) |
| 2016–2018 | Shirak | 66 | (6) |
| 2018–2019 | Banants | 28 | (2) |
| 2019–2020 | Shirak | 24 | (2) |
| 2020–2021 | Ararat Yerevan | 9 | (0) |
| 2021–2022 | Shakhter Karagandy | 16 | (0) |
| 2021 | → Atyrau (loan) | 5 | (0) |
| 2022–2023 | Ararat-Armenia | 37 | (0) |
| 2023 | Caspiy | 8 | (0) |
| 2024–2025 | Pyunik | 35 | (0) |
| 2025–2026 | Al-Arabi | 27 | (1) |
| 2026– | Al-Minaa | 0 | (0) |

International career^{‡}
| 2020– | Armenia | 22 | (0) |
- * Club domestic league appearances and goals as of 1 June 2025 ‡ National team caps and goals as of 23 March 2025

Solomon Ime Udo (Armenian: Սոլոմոն Իմե Ուդո; born 15 July 1995) is a professional footballer who plays as a defensive midfielder for Al-Minaa. Born in Nigeria, he plays for the Armenia national team.

== Club career ==
On 13 June 2018, Udo signed for Banants.

On 10 September 2020, Ararat Yerevan announced the signing of Udo. On 22 February 2021, Ararat Yerevan announced that Udo had moved to Kazakhstan Premier League club Shakhter Karagandy.

On 30 July 2021, Udo joined Atyrau on loan from Shakhter Karagandy for the remainder of the 2021 season.

On 30 January 2022, Udo signed for Ararat-Armenia. On 19 June 2023, Ararat-Armenia confirmed the departure of Udo at the end of his contract.

On 15 January 2024, Pyunik announced the signing of Udo as a free-agent having previously been playing for Caspiy. On 8 August 2025, he left the club.

On 8 August 2025, Udo joined Saudi First Division League side Al-Arabi. Udo scored once in 27 appearances during his time with the club.

On 18 June 2026, he joined Iraq Stars League side Al-Minaa and the club officially announced his signing.

== International career ==
Udo made his international debut for Armenia on 14 October 2020 in the UEFA Nations League, coming on as a substitute in the 42nd minute for Artak Grigoryan in their 1–1 draw against Estonia.

== Personal life ==
Udo was born in Ikot Ekpene, Nigeria. He is happily married and a father of two.

== Career statistics ==
=== Club ===
As of match played 23 September 2023

Appearances and goals by club, season and competition
| Club | Season | League | | | National cup | | Continental | | Other | | Total | |
| Club | Season | Division | Apps | Goals | Apps | Goals | Apps | Goals | Apps | Goals | Apps | Goals |
|---|---|---|---|---|---|---|---|---|---|---|---|---|
| Ararat Yerevan | 2014–15 | Armenian Premier League | 0 | 0 | 0 | 0 | — | | — | | 0 | 0 |
| Ulisses | 2015–16 | Armenian Premier League | 12 | 0 | 1 | 0 | — | | — | | 13 | 0 |
| Shirak | 2015–16 | Armenian Premier League | 10 | 0 | 0 | 0 | 0 | 0 | — | | 10 | 0 |
| Shirak | 2016–17 | Armenian Premier League | 28 | 1 | 4 | 0 | 4 (Note: Appearances in the UEFA Europa League) | 0 | — | | 36 | 1 |
| Shirak | 2017–18 | Armenian Premier League | 28 | 5 | 3 | 0 | 2 | 0 | 1 (Note: Appearances in the Armenian Supercup) | 0 | 34 | 5 |
| Shirak | Total | | 66 | 6 | 7 | 0 | 6 | 0 | 1 | 0 | 80 | 6 |
| Banants | 2018–19 | Armenian Premier League | 28 | 2 | 2 | 0 | 2 | 0 | — | | 32 | 2 |
| Shirak | 2019–20 | Armenian Premier League | 24 | 2 | 1 | 1 | — | | — | | 25 | 3 |
| Shirak | 2020–21 | Armenian Premier League | 0 | 0 | 0 | 0 | 1 | 0 | — | | 1 | 0 |
| Shirak | Total | | 24 | 2 | 1 | 1 | 1 | 0 | - | - | 26 | 3 |
| Ararat Yerevan | 2020–21 | Armenian Premier League | 9 | 0 | 2 | 0 | — | | — | | 11 | 0 |
| Shakhter Karagandy | 2021 | Kazakhstan Premier League | 16 | 0 | 1 | 0 | 0 (Note: Appearances in the UEFA Europa Conference League) | 0 | 2 (Note: Appearances in the Kazakhstan Super Cup) | 0 | 19 | 0 |
| Atyrau | 2021 | Kazakhstan Premier League | 5 | 0 | 3 | 0 | - | | - | | 8 | 0 |
| Ararat-Armenia | 2021–22 | Armenian Premier League | 15 | 0 | 0 | 0 | - | | - | | 15 | 0 |
| Ararat-Armenia | 2022–23 | Armenian Premier League | 22 | 0 | 1 | 0 | 2 | 0 | - | | 25 | 0 |
| Ararat-Armenia | Total | | 37 | 0 | 1 | 0 | 2 | 0 | - | - | 40 | 0 |
| Caspiy | 2023 | Kazakhstan Premier League | 8 | 0 | 0 | 0 | - | | - | | 8 | 0 |
| Career total | | | 205 | 10 | 18 | 1 | 11 | 0 | 3 | 0 | 237 | 11 |

=== International ===
As of match played 23 March 2025

Armenia
| Year | Apps | Goals |
|---|---|---|
| 2020 | 3 | 0 |
| 2021 | 10 | 0 |
| 2022 | 5 | 0 |
| 2024 | 2 | 0 |
| 2025 | 2 | 0 |
| Total | 22 | 0 |

== Honours ==
Pyunik Yerevan

- Armenian Premier League: 2023–24

Ararat Yerevan

- Armenian Cup: 2020–21

Shirak

- Armenian Cup: 2016–17
- Armenian Supercup: 2017
