= Karen Muradyan =

Armenian footballer

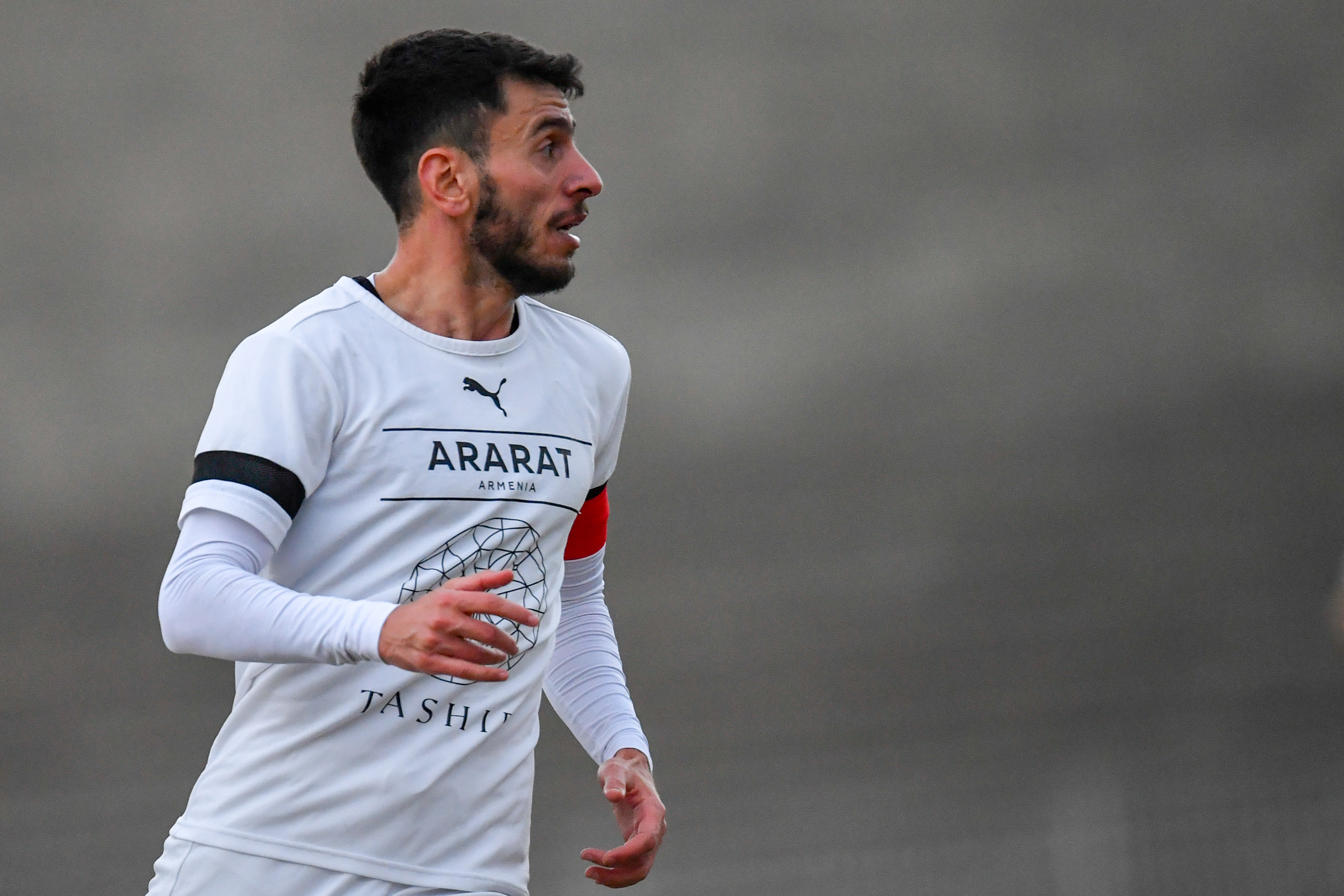
- Muradyan with Ararat-Armenia in 2022

Personal information
- Full name: Karen Rafikovich Muradyan
- Date of birth: 1 November 1992 (age 34)
- Place of birth: Gyumri, Armenia
- Height: 1.82 m (6 ft 0 in)
- Position: Defensive midfielder

Team information
- Current team: Ararat-Armenia
- Number: 19

Youth career
- SDUSHOR Labor Reserves

Senior career*
Years	Team	Apps	(Gls)
2011–2015	Shirak	87	(2)
2015–2017	Alashkert	36	(1)
2017	Gällivare Malmberget	5	(0)
2017	Alashkert	2	(0)
2018–2020	Shirak	51	(1)
2020–2021	Ararat Yerevan	22	(0)
2020	→ Shirak (loan)	0	(0)
2021–	Ararat-Armenia	135	(1)

International career^{‡}
2012–2015	Armenia U21	9	(0)
2012–	Armenia	14	(0)
- * Club domestic league appearances and goals as of 2 December 2025 ‡ National team caps and goals as of 16 November 2025

Karen Muradyan (Armenian: Կարեն Մուրադյան, born 1 November 1992) is an Armenian professional football player who plays as a defensive midfielder for the Armenian Premier League club FC Ararat-Armenia.

== Club career ==
Karen Muradyan was born in Gyumri. At one year of age, he and his parents moved to Russia. Karen started watching football on TV. He liked the sport more and more and wanted to become a football player when he was 7 years old. Two years later, he went to the first football school of CYSS Mytischi. In youth football, he changed three teams, the last of which was the team SDYUSHOR Labor Reserves. With performances in the team in 2008, Muradyan joined a team in Moscow and took second place in the Russian National Football League.

Muradyan moved back to his home Gyumri and met with the breeders of the club Shirak Gyumri. After that, Muradyan invited to play and he was later awarded with a contract. Muradyan debuted on 24 July 2011, in a game against Mika Yerevan. Muradyan entered the field in the first team and played until the 60th minute, when he was replaced by Arman Margaryan, while Gyumri lost 4–1. His Armenian Cup debut came on the draw for next season. On 20 November 2011, Shirak had a home game against Banants Yerevan, which they won with a minimal victory 2–1. Muradyan came off the bench in the 73rd minute of the match, replacing Grachev Mnatsakanyan. In the same drawing, Shirak reached the final, beating Dilijan Impulse 1–0. Muradyan played the entire match and won the 2011–12 Armenian Cup tournament medals.

In 2017, Muradyan played with Gällivare Malmberget in Sweden.

In December 2017, Muradyan left Alashkert. In September 2018, Muradyan joined Shirak. On 5 December 2019, Muradyan extended his contract with Shirak for another year.

On 26 July 2020, Muradyan joined Ararat Yerevan. One month later, Muradyan returned to Shirak on loan to help the club out with their UEFA Europa League qualifying match on 27 August 2021.

On 1 August 2021, Ararat Yerevan announced that Muradyan had left the club after his contract had expired, with Muradyan going on to sign for Ararat-Armenia on 4 August 2021.

== International career ==
Muradyan made his debut for the Armenia national team on 5 February 2013, in a friendly match in Valence, France against Luxembourg.

== Career statistics ==
=== Club ===
As of match played 1 December 2025

Appearances and goals by club, season and competition
Club	Season	League			National cup		Continental		Other		Total	
Club	Season	Division	Apps	Goals	Apps	Goals	Apps	Goals	Apps	Goals	Apps	Goals
Shirak	2011	Armenian Premier League	8	0	2	0	–		–		10	0
Shirak	2012–13	Armenian Premier League	41	1	6	0	4	0	–		51	1
Shirak	2013–14	Armenian Premier League	25	1	2	0	4	0	1	0	32	1
Shirak	2014–15	Armenian Premier League	13	0	2	0	2	0	–		17	0
Shirak	Total		87	2	12	0	10	0	1	0	110	2
Alashkert	2014–15	Armenian Premier League	9	0	2	0	0	0	0	0	11	0
Alashkert	2015–16	Armenian Premier League	19	1	4	0	3	0	0	0	26	1
Alashkert	2016–17	Armenian Premier League	8	0	1	0	4	0	0	0	13	0
Alashkert	Total		36	1	7	0	7	0	0	0	50	1
Gällivare Malmbergets	2017	Division 2 Norrland	5	0	0	0	–		–		5	0
Alashkert	2017–18	Armenian Premier League	2	0	1	0	0	0	0	0	3	0
Shirak	2018–19	Armenian Premier League	24	1	1	0	–		–		25	1
Shirak	2019–20	Armenian Premier League	27	0	1	0	–		–		28	0
Shirak	Total		51	1	2	0	0	0	0	0	53	1
Ararat Yerevan	2020–21	Armenian Premier League	22	0	6	0	–		–		28	0
Ararat Yerevan	2021–22	Armenian Premier League	0	0	0	0	3	0	–		3	0
Ararat Yerevan	Total		22	0	6	0	3	0	0	0	31	0
Shirak (loan)	2020–21	Armenian Premier League	0	0	0	0	1	0	–		1	0
Ararat-Armenia	2021–22	Armenian Premier League	27	0	1	0	–		–		28	0
Ararat-Armenia	2022–23	Armenian Premier League	34	0	2	0	2	0	–		38	0
Ararat-Armenia	2023–24	Armenian Premier League	31	0	4	0	4	0	–		39	0
Ararat-Armenia	2024–25	Armenian Premier League	29	1	5	0	3	0	1	0	38	1
Ararat-Armenia	2025–26	Armenian Premier League	14	0	0	0	4	0	–		18	0
Ararat-Armenia	Total		135	1	12	0	13	0	1	0	161	0
Career total			338	5	40	0	34	0	2	0	414	5

=== International ===
As of match played 16 November 2025

Appearances and goals by national team and year
National team	Year	Apps	Goals
Armenia	2013	2	0
Armenia	2016	2	0
Armenia	2020	2	0
Armenia	2021	4	0
Armenia	2022	1	0
Armenia	2025	3	0
Total		14	0

== Honours ==
Ararat-Armenia

- Armenian Premier League: 2025–26
- Armenian Cup: 2023–24
- Armenian Supercup: 2024

Shirak Gyumri

- Armenian Cup: 2011–12; runner-up 2011
