= Hrayr Mkoyan =

Armenian footballer (born 1986)

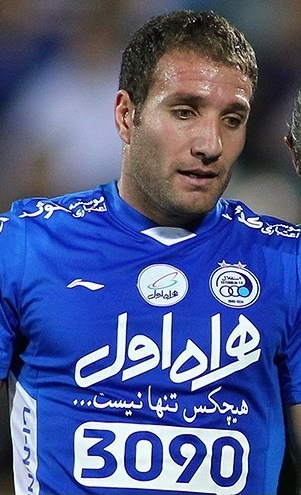
- Mkoyan with Esteghlal in 2016

Personal information
- Full name: Hrayr Oganesovich Mkoyan
- Date of birth: 2 September 1986 (age 40)
- Place of birth: Leninakan, Armenian SSR
- Height: 1.82 m (6 ft 0 in)
- Position: Centre-back

Youth career
- 2002–2005: Shirak

Senior career*
Years	Team	Apps	(Gls)
2005–2009	Shirak	38	(2)
2007–2008	→ Ararat Yerevan (loan)	47	(0)
2009	→ Ulisses (loan)	27	(3)
2010–2011	Mika	50	(2)
2012	Spartak Nalchik	1	(0)
2012–2013	Shirak	18	(1)
2012–2013	→ Budějovice (loan)	7	(1)
2013–2014	Gandzasar Kapan	11	(0)
2013–2014	Shirak	13	(0)
2014–2017	Esteghlal	63	(0)
2018	Shirak	9	(0)
2018	Ararat-Armenia	3	(1)
2018–2019	Alashkert	13	(0)
2019–2020	Shirak	19	(0)
2020–2023	Ararat Yerevan	77	(0)
2023–2025	Shirak	50	(0)
2025–2026	Van	25	(2)

International career
2007–2008	Armenia U21	7	(0)
2009–	Armenia	52	(1)
- * Club domestic league appearances and goals as of 27 June 2026

Hrayr Mkoyan (Armenian: Հրայր Մկոյան, born 2 September 1986) is an Armenian professional footballer who last played as a centre-back for Van, which he captains, and the Armenia national team. He was voted runner-up for the Armenian Footballer of the Year award in 2009.

== Club career ==
=== Ararat Yerevan ===
Hrayr Mkoyan spent his youth career at Shirak Gyumri. He debuted for the first team at 18 years of age. In 2007, Mkoyan attracted breeders from Ararat Yerevan. For two seasons at the Yerevan team, Hrayr spent 47 meetings. Normal performance for the club prevented a permanent objective and subjective pressure on Ararat.

=== Ulisses ===
In 2009, Mkoyan moved on loan to the capital club Ulisses Yerevan, with whom he won third place in the 2009 Armenian Premier League. However, after the lease agreement, Hrayr left Ulisses and signed a two-year contract with Mika Yerevan.

=== Mika ===
On 22 December 2009, at the headquarters of the Football Federation of Armenia ceremony of awarding the players of last season took place, during which the winner of the award Armenian Footballer of the Year in 2009 was declared. Based on the voting, Hrayr took second place, losing the title to Henrikh Mkhitaryan.

=== Spartak Nalchik ===
On 12 January 2012, Mkoyan signed an agreement with the semi-annual club Spartak Nalchik. According to the agreement, if the Spartak will retain a place in the Russian Premier League, the contract will be extended for two years. Otherwise Hrayr leave the club in the status of a free agent. Spartak took the last place in the First Division, and fell to the Russian National Football League, and Mkoyan became a free agent.

=== Shirak ===
In June, it was reported Mkoyan return to his native club Shirak Gyumri. Mkoyan himself did not refuse such an opportunity, if any. The parties were clearly set to work, and in the middle of the month the contract flock signature of both parties. Mkoyan officially returned to the location of the club where his career began, and the club returned to the existing experienced players to participate not only in the domestic competition, but also in European competition. The agreement is designed for six months.

=== Loan to Dynamo ===
On 9 February 2013, Mkoyan tried out for Czech club Dynamo České Budějovice. He joined the club two days later. According to head coach Miroslav Soukup, "Mkoyan made a good impression in a short time, and I think he will make our team stronger." A contract valid until the end of next season was signed.

=== Esteghlal ===
On 16 June 2014, Mkoyan joined Iran Pro League club Esteghlal. He signed a two-year contract with the club.

=== Shirak ===
On 30 January 2018, Mkoyan returned to his native club FC Shirak, signing a six-month contract.

=== Alashkert ===
After starting the 2018–19 season with FC Ararat-Armenia, Mkoyan signed a one-year contract with FC Alashkert on 28 August 2018.

=== Ararat Yerevan ===
On 28 July 2020, FC Ararat Yerevan announced the signing of Mkoyan.

=== Shirak ===
On 23 June 2025, Shirak announced the departure of Mkoyan and five other players at the end of their contracts.

=== Van ===
On 10 July 2025, Van announced the signing of Mkoyan. On 27 June 2026, Van announced that Mkoyan had left the club.

== International career ==
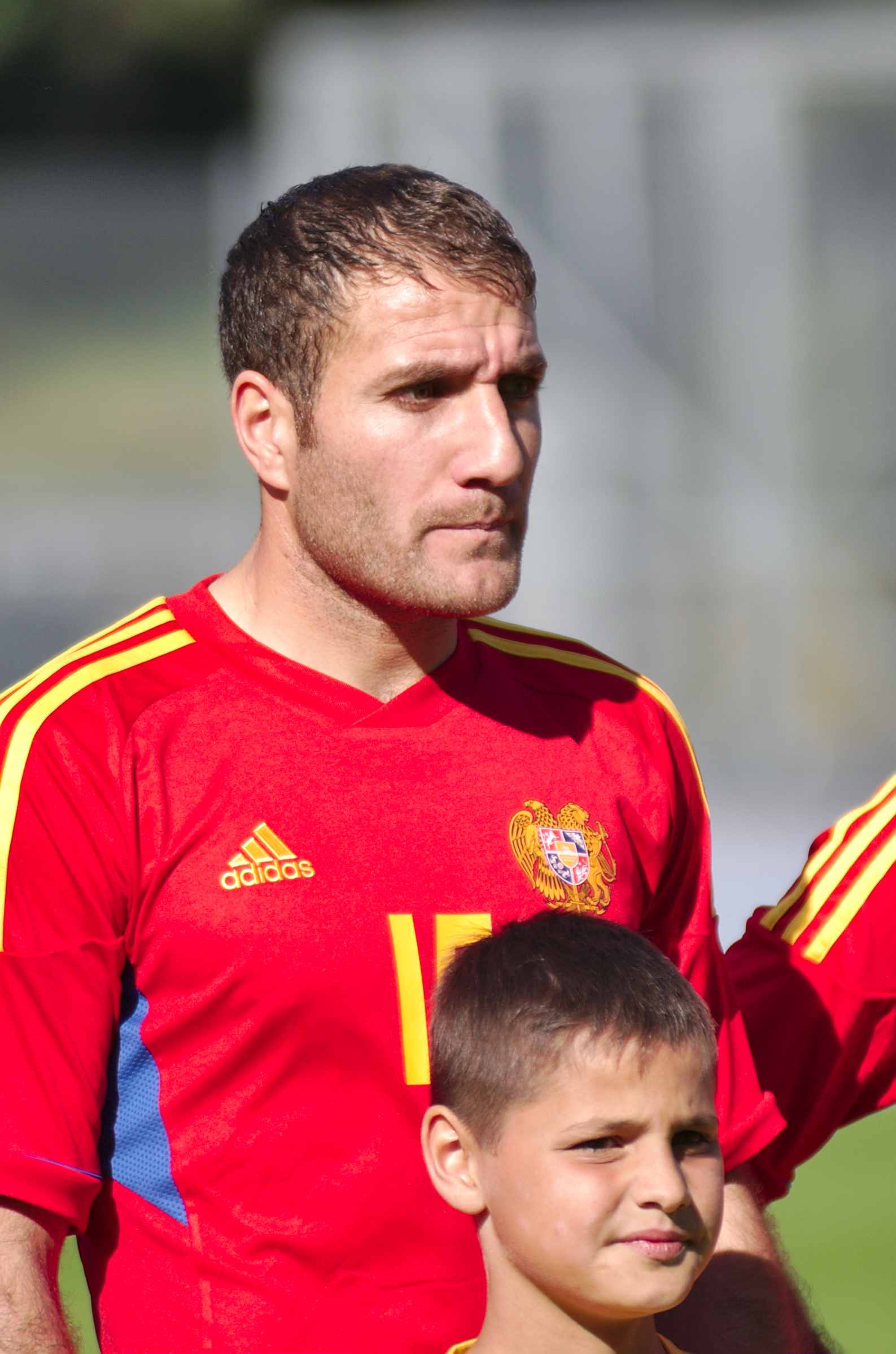
Mkoyan before Armenia match with Algeria

Between performances for Ararat Yerevan, Mkoyan was involved in the ranks of the youth Armenia U-21 national team, which he played seven games for.

Since 2009, he plays for the Armenia national football team. Mkoyan debuted on 9 September 2009, in a 2010 FIFA World Cup qualification match against Belgium. The match took place in the Yerevan Republican Stadium and ended 2–1 in victory by the Armenia national team.

== Career statistics ==
=== Club ===
As of match played 2 December 2025

Appearances and goals by club, season and competition
Club	Season	League			National cup		Continental		Other		Total	
Club	Season	Division	Apps	Goals	Apps	Goals	Apps	Goals	Apps	Goals	Apps	Goals
Shirak	2004	Armenian Premier League	3	0			0 (Note: Appearances in UEFA Cup)	0	—		3	0
Shirak	2005	Armenian Premier League	13	0			—		—		3	0
Shirak	2006	Armenian Premier League	22	2			—		—		3	0
Shirak	Total		38	2			—		—		38	2
Ararat Yerevan (loan)	2007	Armenian Premier League	23	0			2 (Note: Appearances in UEFA Intertoto Cup)	0	—		25	0
Ararat Yerevan (loan)	2008	Armenian Premier League	24	0			2	1	—		26	1
Ararat Yerevan (loan)	Total		47	0			4	0	—		51	0
Ulisses (loan)	2009	Armenian Premier League	27	3			0	0	—		27	3
Mika	2010	Armenian Premier League	24	1	3	0	2 (Note: Appearances in UEFA Europa League)	0	—		29	1
Mika	2011	Armenian Premier League	26	1	7	0	2	0	—		35	1
Mika	Total		50	2	10	0	4	0	—		64	2
Spartak Nalchik	2011–12	Russian Premier League	1	0	0	0	—		—		1	0
Shirak	2012–13	Armenian Premier League	18	1	0	0	4	0	—		22	1
Dynamo České Budějovice (loan)	2012–13	Czech First League	7	1	0	0	—		—		7	1
Gandzasar Kapan	2013–14	Armenian Premier League	11	0	1	0	0	0	—		12	0
Shirak	2013–14	Armenian Premier League	13	0	0	0	0 (Note: Appearances in UEFA Champions League)	0	0 (Note: Appearances in Armenian Supercup)	0	13	0
Esteghlal	2014–15	Persian Gulf Pro League	23	0	0	0	—		—		23	0
Esteghlal	2015–16	Persian Gulf Pro League	26	0	4	0	—		—		30	0
Esteghlal	2016–17	Persian Gulf Pro League	14	0	4	0	4 (Note: Appearances in AFC Champions League)	0	—		22	0
Esteghlal	Total		63	2	8	0	4	0	—		75	0
Shirak	2017–18	Armenian Premier League	14	0	2	0	0	0	0	0	16	0
Ararat-Armenia	2018–19	Armenian Premier League	3	1	0	0	—		—		3	1
Alashkert	2018–19	Armenian Premier League	13	0	3	1	0	0	0	0	16	1
Alashkert	2019–20	Armenian Premier League	—		—		4	0	—		4	0
Alashkert	Total		13	0	3	1	4	0	0	0	20	1
Shirak	2019–20	Armenian Premier League	19	0	0	0	—		—		19	0
Shirak	2020–21	Armenian Premier League	—		—		1	0	—		1	0
Shirak	Total		19	0	0	0	1	0	—		20	0
Ararat Yerevan	2020–21	Armenian Premier League	19	0	5	0	—		—		24	0
Ararat Yerevan	2021–22	Armenian Premier League	29	0	2	0	4 (Note: Appearances in UEFA Conference League)	0	1	0	36	0
Ararat Yerevan	2022–23	Armenian Premier League	29	0	1	0	2	0	—		32	0
Ararat Yerevan	Total		77	0	8	0	6	0	1	0	92	0
Shirak	2023–24	Armenian Premier League	25	0	2	0	—		1	0	28	0
Shirak	2024–25	Armenian Premier League	25	0	1	0	—		—		26	0
Shirak	Total		50	0	3	0	—		1	0	54	0
Van	2025–26	Armenian Premier League	25	2	0	0	0	0	0	0	25	2
Career total			476	14	35+	1+	27	0	2	0	540+	15+

=== International ===
As of match played 27 September 2022

Appearances and goals by national team and year
National team	Year	Apps	Goals
Armenia	2009	3	0
Armenia	2010	4	0
Armenia	2011	7	0
Armenia	2012	7	0
Armenia	2013	5	0
Armenia	2014	6	0
Armenia	2015	3	1
Armenia	2016	6	0
Armenia	2017	2	0
Armenia	2018	3	0
Armenia	2022	6	0
Total		52	1

As of goal scored on 13 June 2015
Scores and results list Armenia's goal tally first, score column indicates score after each Armenia goal.

List of international goals scored by Hrayr Mkoyan
No.	Date	Venue	Opponent	Score	Result	Competition	Ref.
1	13 June 2015	Republican Stadium, Yerevan, Armenia	Portugal	2–3	2–3	UEFA Euro 2016 qualification	

== Honours ==
Ararat Yerevan

- Armenian Premier League runner-up: 2008
- Armenian Cup: 2008
- Armenian Cup runner-up: 2007

Mika

- Armenian Cup: 2011

Alashkert

- Armenian Cup: 2018–19
