= Aleksandr Kozlov (footballer) =

Russian footballer (1993–2022)

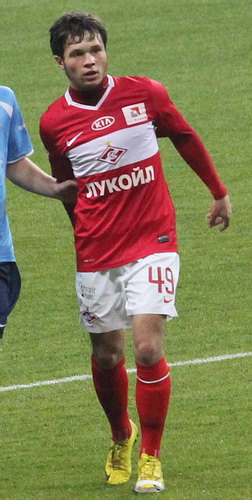

Personal information
- Full name: Aleksandr Sergeyevich Kozlov
- Date of birth: 19 March 1993
- Place of birth: Moscow, Russia
- Date of death: 15 July 2022 (aged 29)
- Height: 1.70 m (5 ft 7 in)
- Positions: Midfielder; striker

Youth career
- Spartak Moscow

Senior career*
Years	Team	Apps	(Gls)
2010–2016	Spartak Moscow	22	(1)
2012	→ Khimki (loan)	4	(0)
2013–2016	→ Spartak-2 Moscow	36	(10)
2016	Tosno	2	(0)
2016	Fakel Voronezh	15	(0)
2017	Okzhetpes	28	(4)
2018	Tyumen	5	(0)
2018	Khimki	6	(1)
2018	→ Khimki-M	8	(1)
2019	Ararat Moscow (amateur)		
2019–2020	Ararat Yerevan	19	(4)
2021–2022	Kafa Feodosia		

International career
2008–2009	Russia U17	18	(20)
2009–2010	Russia U18	15	(9)
2010–2012	Russia U19	4	(4)
2013	Russia U21	7	(1)
- * Club domestic league appearances and goals

Aleksandr Sergeyevich Kozlov (Russian: Александр Серге́евич Козлов; 19 March 1993 – 15 July 2022) was a Russian professional footballer who played as a midfielder or striker.

== Career ==
Kozlov made his debut in the Russian Premier League on 25 April 2010 for FC Spartak Moscow.

On 16 January 2017, Kozlov signed a one-year contract with Kazakhstan Premier League side FC Okzhetpes.

On 26 June 2019, Ararat Yerevan announced the signing of Kozlov along with another twelve players.

== Death ==
On 15 July 2022, Spartak Moscow announced the death of Kozlov, reportedly as a result of a blood clot suffered during training with Zorkiy Krasnogorsk.

== Career statistics ==
As of match played 5 November 2017

Appearances and goals by club, season and competition
Club	Season	League			National cup		Continental		Other		Total	
Club	Season	Division	Apps	Goals	Apps	Goals	Apps	Goals	Apps	Goals	Apps	Goals
Spartak Moscow	2010	Russian Premier League	12	0	1	0	2	0	—		15	0
Spartak Moscow	2011–12	Russian Premier League	8	1	1	0	1	0	—		10	1
Spartak Moscow	2012–13	Russian Premier League	1	0	0	0	3	0	—		4	0
Spartak Moscow	2013–14	Russian Premier League	0	0	0	0	—		—		0	0
Spartak Moscow	2014–15	Russian Premier League	0	0	0	0	—		—		0	0
Spartak Moscow	2015–16	Russian Premier League	1	0	0	0	—		—		1	0
Spartak Moscow	Total	Russian Premier League	22	1	2	0	0	0	0	0	24	1
Khimki (loan)	2012–13	Russian National League	4	0	0	0	—		—		4	0
Tosno	2016–17	Russian National League	2	0	0	0	—		—		2	0
Fakel Voronezh	2016–17	Russian National League	15	0	1	0	—		—		16	0
Okzhetpes	2017	Kazakhstan Premier League	28	4	1	0	—		—		29	4
Tyumen	2017–18	Russian National League	5	0	0	0	—		—		5	0
Khimki	2018–19	Russian National League	6	1	1	0	—		—		7	1
Khimki-M	2018–19	Russian National League 2	8	1	0	0	—		—		8	1
Ararat Yerevan	2019–20	Armenian Premier League	19	4	1	0	—		—		20	4
Ararat Yerevan	2020–21	Armenian Premier League	0	0	0	0	—		—		0	0
Ararat Yerevan	Total		19	4	1	0	-	-	-	-	20	4
Career total			109	11	5	0	6	0	0	0	121	11
