= Gyumri Football Academy =

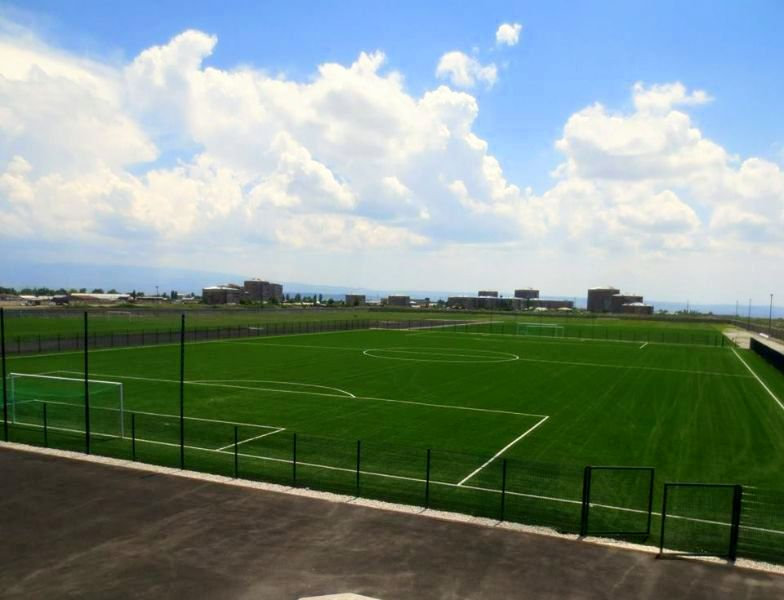
- Gyumri Football Academy
- Interactive map of Gyumri Football Academy
- Address: Mush II district, Gyumri, Armenia
- Coordinates: 40°48′40″N 43°49′20″E
- Owner: Football Federation of Armenia
- Type: Football training facility

Construction
- Built: 2011–2014
- Opened: 13 September 2014

Tenant
- FC Shirak (training)

The Gyumri Football Academy (Armenian: Գյումրիի ֆուտբոլի ակադեմիա), is a modern football training school located in Armenia's 2nd-largest city of Gyumri, Shirak Province.

== Overview ==
The construction of the academy was launched in late 2011 by the Football Federation of Armenia. On 13 September 2014, the complex was officially opened by the FFA president Ruben Hayrapetyan and the mayor of Gyumri Samvel Balasanian. The opening ceremony was attended by the President of Armenia Serzh Sargsyan.

Occupying an area of 80,000 m^{2}, the complex is home to:

- 5 natural-grass regular-sized football training pitches.
- 1 artificial turf regular-sized football training pitch.
- 1 artificial turf mini football training pitch.
- Three-story service building with a total area of 1,200 m^{2}, including a fitness centre and spa, physiotherapy rooms, medical services, conference room, etc.

The academy is able to serve up to 1,000 trainees. All of the training pitches meet the professional standards set by FIFA and UEFA.
