= Marko Prljević =

Serbian footballer

Personal information
- Full name: Marko Prljević
- Date of birth: 2 August 1988 (age 38)
- Place of birth: Titovo Užice, SFR Yugoslavia
- Height: 1.94 m (6 ft 4 in)
- Position: Centre-back

Team information
- Current team: Sloboda Donji Tovarnik

Senior career*
Years	Team	Apps	(Gls)
2006–2007	Policajac Beograd		
2007	→ Big Bull Bačinci (loan)	16	(1)
2007–2008	Big Bull Bačinci	25	(2)
2008–2009	Inđija	3	(0)
2009–2010	Big Bull Bačinci	15	(5)
2010	→ Donji Srem (loan)	15	(1)
2010–2015	Donji Srem	100	(2)
2015–2016	Rad	13	(0)
2016	Borac Banja Luka	1	(0)
2016–2017	Shirak	19	(1)
2017	Proleter Novi Sad	1	(0)
2018	Shirak	13	(1)
2018	Tsarsko Selo	14	(1)
2019–2020	Shirak	40	(0)
2020–2022	Ararat Yerevan	43	(1)
2022–2023	Shirak	28	(0)
2023–2024	Radnički Sremska Mitrovica	12	(1)
2024–	Sloboda Donji Tovarnik		
- * Club domestic league appearances and goals as of 2 July 2024

Marko Prljević (Serbian Cyrillic: Марко Прљевић; born 2 August 1988) is a Serbian football defender who plays for Sloboda Donji Tovarnik.

== Career ==
At the beginning of August 2017, Prljević left Shirak.

In July 2018, Prljević signed with Bulgarian Second League side Tsarsko Selo.

On 2 August 2022, Ararat Yerevan confirmed that Prljević had left the club after his contract had expired, with Shirak announcing his return to their club the same day.

== Honours ==
Donji Srem

- Serbian League Vojvodina: 2010–11
