= Igor Stanojević =

Serbian footballer

Personal information
- Full name: Igor Stanojević
- Date of birth: 24 October 1991 (age 35)
- Place of birth: Belgrade, SFR Yugoslavia
- Height: 1.76 m (5 ft 9 in)
- Position: Attacking midfielder

Team information
- Current team: T6 NIKA Lepušnica

Senior career*
Years	Team	Apps	(Gls)
2009–2011	Padinska Skela		
2011–2013	OFK Beograd	1	(0)
2012–2013	→ Padinska Skela (loan)	24	(9)
2013	Grindavík	9	(5)
2014	BSK Borča	9	(0)
2014	IM Rakovica	14	(11)
2015	Pelister	13	(1)
2015–2016	Metalac GM	18	(4)
2016–2017	Zemun	16	(2)
2017–2018	Shirak	27	(3)
2018–2019	Banants	29	(3)
2020	Mačva Šabac	6	(0)
2020–2021	Ararat	8	(1)
2021	Shirak	12	(2)
2021-2022	Ararat	12	(2)
2022-2024	Inđija	14	(0)
2024-	T6 NIKA Lepušnica		
- * Club domestic league appearances and goals as of 26 December 2023

Igor Stanojević (Serbian Cyrillic: Игор Станојевић; born 24 October 1991) is a Serbian professional footballer who plays as a midfielder for T6 NIKA Lepušnica.

== Career ==
=== Club ===
On 15 June 2018, Stanojević signed for FC Banants.

On 17 July 2022, Ararat Yerevan announced the departure of Stanojević by mutual agreement.
