= Spasoje Stefanović =

Serbian footballer

Personal information
- Date of birth: 12 October 1992 (age 34)
- Place of birth: Pristina, FR Yugoslavia
- Height: 1.90 m (6 ft 3 in)
- Position: Goalkeeper

Youth career
- OFK Beograd

College career
Years	Team	Apps	(Gls)
2014–2016	South Florida Bulls	40	(0)

Senior career*
Years	Team	Apps	(Gls)
2010	BSK Borča	0	(0)
2011	Teleoptik	0	(0)
2011–2012	Beograd	11	(0)
2012	Radnički Obrenovac	0	(0)
2013–2014	BASK	11	(0)
2017	Radnički 1923	3	(0)
2018	Skopje	17	(0)
2018	Sileks	16	(0)
2019	Kajaani	4	(0)
2019–2020	Sinđelić Beograd	17	(0)
2020	Ararat Yerevan	0	(0)
2021	Shirak	12	(0)
2021	Radnički Sremska Mitrovica	1	(0)
- * Club domestic league appearances and goals as of 18 September 2021

Spasoje Stefanović (Serbian: Спасоје Стефановић; born 12 October 1992) is a Serbian footballer who most recently played for Radnički Sremska Mitrovica.

== Club career ==
After failing to make an appearance for Serbian second division sides FK BSK Borča as well as FK Teleoptik, Stefanović played college soccer for the University of South Florida.

For the second half of 2017–18, he signed for FK Skopje in Macedonia.

For 2019, he signed for Finnish second division club AC Kajaani.

In 2019, Stefanović returned to Serbia with FK Sinđelić Beograd.

On 5 September 2020, Stefanović signed for Ararat Yerevan from Sinđelić Beograd. On 15 January 2021, Stefanović left Ararat Yerevan, signing for Shirak on 16 January 2021.

== International career ==
He was selected for Serbia's squad for the 2011 UEFA European Under-19 Championship, but remained a back-up to Nikola Perić in all games.
