= Aghvan Papikyan =

Armenian football winger (born 1994)

Personal information
- Full name: Aghvan Papikyan
- Date of birth: 8 February 1994 (age 32)
- Place of birth: Łódź, Poland
- Height: 1.73 m (5 ft 8 in)
- Position: Winger

Team information
- Current team: Football Campus Tomaszów Maz.

Youth career
- 2005–2011: ŁKS Łódź

Senior career*
Years	Team	Apps	(Gls)
2011–2013	ŁKS Łódź	15	(0)
2013–2014	Spartak Moscow	0	(0)
2013–2014	→ FC Pyunik (loan)	18	(4)
2014–2015	Ulisses FC	19	(2)
2015–2017	GKS Bełchatów	37	(6)
2017	Raków Częstochowa	15	(1)
2018–2019	Olimpia Grudziądz	28	(8)
2019–2020	Chojniczanka Chojnice	25	(3)
2020	Alashkert	1	(0)
2020–2021	Ararat Yerevan	18	(1)
2021–2022	Alashkert	11	(0)
2022	Wisła Puławy	14	(0)
2023	Olimpia Grudziądz	14	(1)
2024–2025	Unia Skierniewice	32	(8)
2025–2026	Relax Czerniewice	17	(35)
2026–	Football Campus Tomaszów Maz.	0	(0)

International career
2010–2011	Armenia U17	3	(1)
2011	Armenia U19	9	(2)
2012	Armenia U21	17	(1)
2013–2014	Armenia	2	(0)
- * Club domestic league appearances and goals as of 17:55, 8 June 2025 (UTC)

Aghvan Papikyan (Armenian: Աղվան Պապիկյանը, born 8 February 1994) is a professional footballer who plays as a winger for Klasa A club Football Campus Tomaszów Mazowiecki. Born in Poland, he was a member of the Armenia national team.

== Club career ==
Aghvan was a pupil of the football academy ŁKS Łódź. He completed the stages of the club academy along with his older brother Volodya. In 2011, he was included in the first team. Papikyan played 8 matches in total for Łódź.

In February 2013, he transferred to Spartak Moscow.

On 4 September 2020, less than a month after joining FC Alashkert, he moved to Ararat Yerevan.

== International career ==
Aghvan Papikyan has played for the junior and youth teams of Armenia. He has stated, "I play for the Armenia because that's where my roots are from and I feel Armenian." Papikyan had no desire to join the Poland national football team and couldn't anyway due to citizenship issues, but said he still "feels something towards Poland".

After a match between the Armenia U21 and Armenia national teams on 21 March 2013, Papikyan was among three youth players chosen by the Football Federation of Armenia to join the senior team.

== Personal life ==
Aghvan is the son of Armenian former football player and current football manager Arsen Papikyan and also has a one-year older brother Volodya who played midfielder for ŁKS Łódź with Aghvan. His parents and brother were born in Armenia and decided to work and live to Poland, where Aghvan was born one year later.

Although born in Poland, he only obtained Polish citizenship on 2 October 2017.

== Career statistics ==
=== International ===
Appearances and goals by national team and year
National team	Year	Apps	Goals
Armenia
Armenia	2013	1	0
Armenia	2014	1	0
Total		2	0

== Honours ==
FC Pyunik

- Armenian Cup: 2013–14

Ararat Yerevan

- Armenian Cup: 2020–21

Unia Skierniewice

- Polish Cup (Łódź regionals): 2023–24
