= Uroš Nenadović =

Serbian footballer

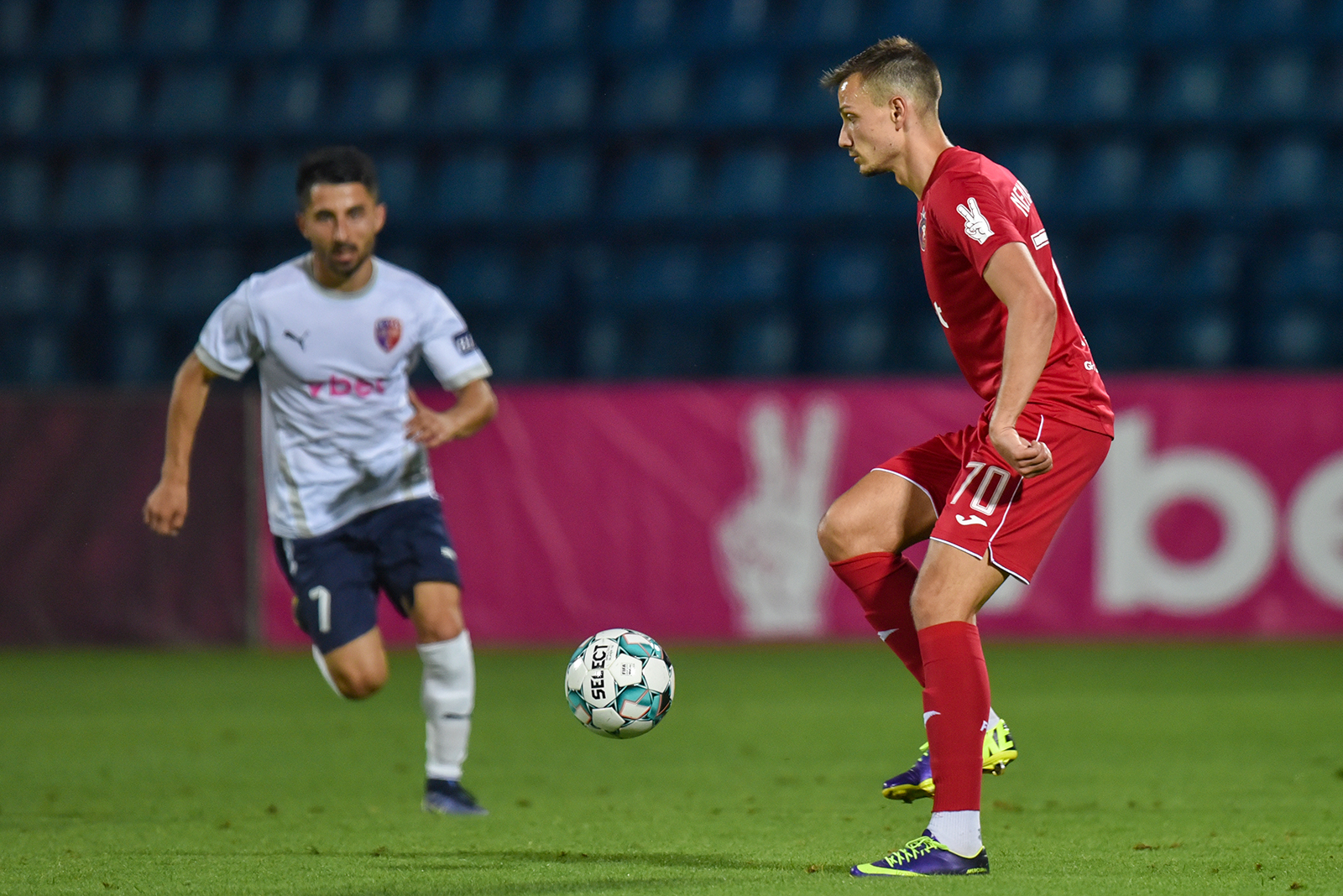
- Nenadović with Pyunik in 2022

Personal information
- Date of birth: 28 January 1994 (age 32)
- Place of birth: Belgrade, FR Yugoslavia
- Height: 1.84 m (6 ft 0 in)
- Position: Winger

Team information
- Current team: Borac Čačak
- Number: 28

Senior career*
| Years | Team | Apps | (Gls) |
| 2011–2013 | OFK Beograd | 1 | (0) |
| 2012 | → Novi Sad (loan) | 1 | (0) |
| 2013–2014 | Novi Pazar | 7 | (0) |
| 2014 | Vojvodina | 0 | (0) |
| 2014–2016 | Rad | 38 | (3) |
| 2016–2017 | Radnik Surdulica | 7 | (0) |
| 2017–2019 | Alashkert | 68 | (18) |
| 2019 | Horsens | 0 | (0) |
| 2020 | Shirak | 10 | (2) |
| 2020–2021 | Ararat Yerevan | 18 | (7) |
| 2021 | Taraz | 7 | (0) |
| 2022 | Pyunik | 16 | (3) |
| 2023 | Alashkert | 12 | (1) |
| 2023–2024 | Napredak Kruševac | 15 | (0) |
| 2024– | Borac Čačak | 26 | (3) |
- * Club domestic league appearances and goals as of 1 July 2025

Uroš Nenadović (Serbian Cyrillic: Урош Ненадовић; born 28 January 1994) is a Serbian professional footballer who plays as a winger for Borac Čačak.

== Career ==
In September 2019, Nenadović left AC Horsens after less than a month with the club.

On 23 January 2020, Nenadović signed for Shirak SC.

On 24 June 2021, Ararat Yerevan announced the departure of Nenadović.

On 26 June 2021, Taraz announced the signing of Nenadović.

On 22 January 2022, Nenadović signed for FC Pyunik. On 27 December 2022, Pyunik announced that Nenadović would be leaving the club.

On 21 January 2023, Alashkert announced the return of Nenadović. Nenadović left Alashkert on 17 June 2023.

== Career statistics ==
=== Club ===
As of match played 4 July 2017

Appearances and goals by club, season and competition
| Club | Season | League | | | National cup | | Continental | | Other | | Total | |
| Club | Season | Division | Apps | Goals | Apps | Goals | Apps | Goals | Apps | Goals | Apps | Goals |
|---|---|---|---|---|---|---|---|---|---|---|---|---|
| OFK Beograd | 2011–12 | Serbian SuperLiga | 1 | 0 | 0 | 0 | — | | — | | 1 | 0 |
| OFK Beograd | 2012–13 | Serbian SuperLiga | 0 | 0 | 0 | 0 | — | | — | | 0 | 0 |
| OFK Beograd | Total | | 1 | 0 | 0 | 0 | — | | — | | 1 | 0 |
| Novi Sad (loan) | 2012–13 | Serbian First League | 1 | 0 | 0 | 0 | — | | — | | 1 | 0 |
| Novi Pazar | 2013–14 | Serbian SuperLiga | 7 | 0 | 0 | 0 | — | | — | | 7 | 0 |
| Vojvodina | 2013–14 | Serbian SuperLiga | 0 | 0 | 0 | 0 | — | | — | | 0 | 0 |
| Rad | 2014–15 | Serbian SuperLiga | 13 | 1 | 0 | 0 | — | | — | | 13 | 1 |
| Rad | 2015–16 | Serbian SuperLiga | 25 | 2 | 2 | 0 | — | | — | | 27 | 2 |
| Rad | Total | | 38 | 3 | 2 | 0 | — | | — | | 40 | 3 |
| Radnik Surdulica (loan) | 2016–17 | Serbian SuperLiga | 7 | 0 | 0 | 0 | — | | — | | 7 | 0 |
| Alashkert | 2016–17 | Armenian Premier League | 11 | 4 | 0 | 0 | — | | — | | 11 | 4 |
| Alashkert | 2017–18 | Armenian Premier League | 29 | 8 | 4 | 0 | 4 | 3 | 1 | 0 | 38 | 11 |
| Alashkert | 2018–19 | Armenian Premier League | 28 | 6 | 5 | 0 | 10 | 1 | — | | 43 | 7 |
| Alashkert | Total | | 68 | 18 | 9 | 0 | 14 | 4 | 1 | 0 | 92 | 22 |
| Career total | | | 121 | 21 | 12 | 0 | 14 | 4 | 1 | 0 | 148 | 25 |

== Honours ==
Pyunik

- Armenian Premier League: 2021–22

Alashkert

- Armenian Cup: 2018–19
