= Maksym Zaderaka =

Ukrainian footballer

Personal information
- Full name: Maksym Serhiyovych Zaderaka
- Date of birth: 7 September 1994 (age 32)
- Place of birth: Oleksandriya, Ukraine
- Height: 1.73 m (5 ft 8 in)
- Position: Midfielder

Team information
- Current team: FSC Bukovyna Chernivtsi
- Number: 94

Youth career
- 2002–2010: Oleksandriya

Senior career*
Years	Team	Apps	(Gls)
2009–2010	Ametyst Oleksandriya	9	(2)
2010–2015	Metalurh Donetsk	5	(0)
2015–2018	Stal Kamianske	42	(0)
2018–2020	Oleksandriya	60	(2)
2021	Ararat Yerevan	10	(3)
2021–2022	Metalist 1925 Kharkiv	10	(0)
2022–26	Kryvbas Kryvyi Rih	80	(17)
2026-	FSC Bukovyna Chernivtsi	4	(0)

International career^{‡}
2013	Ukraine U20	1	(0)
- * Club domestic league appearances and goals as of 13/9/26 @ 13:36(AEST) ‡ National team caps and goals as of 3 July 2021

Maksym Serhiyovych Zaderaka (Ukrainian: Максим Сергійович Задерака; born 7 September 1994) is a Ukrainian professional footballer who plays as a midfielder for Kryvbas Kryvyi Rih.

== Career ==
Zaderaka is a product of the youth team systems of Oleksandriya (first coach was Valeriy Kurhanov). He signed a contract with Metalurh Donetsk in 2010. He made his debut for Metalurh Donetsk in a game against Dnipro Dnipropetrovsk on 25 July 2014 in the Ukrainian Premier League.

== Honours ==
Individual

- Ukrainian Premier League Player of the Month: September 2023
- SportArena Player of the Round: 2025–26 (Round 3),
- Ukrainian Premier League Player of the Round: 2025–26 (Round 3)
