= 2018–19 FC Ararat Yerevan season =

Ararat Yerevan
2018–19 season
- President: Hiraç Yagan
- Manager: Armen Stepanyan (30 July-30 September; Abraham Khashmanyan (from 1 October)
- Stadium: Hrazdan Stadium
- Premier League: 9th
- Armenian Cup: Second Round vs Banants
- Top goalscorer: League: Artem Simonyan (6); All: Artem Simonyan (6)
Home colours	Away colours	Third colours

The 2018–19 season was FC Ararat Yerevan's 28th consecutive season in the Armenian Premier League. They finished the season in ninth and last place, in the Armenian Premier League whilst being knocked out of the Armenian Cup by Banants in the Second Round.

== Season events ==
On 30 July, Armen Stepanyan was appointed as Ararat Yerevan's new Head Coach.

On 4 August, Ararat announced the singings of Zaven Badoyan, Alan Tatayev, Roni and Dmitri Malyaka, whilst Arman Meliksetyan, Argishti Petrosyan and Gegham Tumbaryan were all released by mutual consent.

== Squad ==
As of match played 30 May 2019

Number	Name	Nationality	Position	Date of birth (age)	Signed from	Signed in	Contract ends	Apps.	Goals
Goalkeepers
1	Mikhail Petrushchenkov	(Russia)	GK	28 June 1993 (aged 25)	Zelenograd	2018		23	0
12	Poghos Ayvazyan	(Armenia)	GK	9 June 1995 (aged 23)	Mika	2016		20	0
	Suren Aloyan	(Armenia)	GK	10 August 1997 (aged 21)	Banants	2019		0	0
Defenders
3	Matvey Guyganov	(Russia)	DF	28 July 1994 (aged 24)	Sevastopol	2019		13	0
4	Kevin Ntika	(Belgium)	DF	24 July 1995 (aged 23)	Trakai	2019		9	0
5	Vardan Arzoyan	(Armenia)	DF	30 April 1995 (aged 24)	Pyunik	2016		76	2
7	Gor Poghosyan	(Armenia)	DF	11 June 1988 (aged 30)	Kotayk	2017		66	2
14	Mykhaylo Kaluhin	(Ukraine)	DF	20 November 1994 (aged 24)	Isloch Minsk Raion	2019		7	0
18	Hayk Sargsyan	(Armenia)	DF	12 March 1998 (aged 21)	Gandzasar Kapan	2019		2	0
20	Rafael Safaryan (captain)	(Armenia)	DF	30 January 1986 (aged 33)		2016			
	Vahe Chopuryan	(Armenia)	DF	1 December 1997 (aged 20)	Youth team	2018		15	0
	Volodya Samsonyan	(Armenia)	DF	24 February 2001 (aged 17)	Youth team	2018		10	0
	Magomed Abidinov	(Russia)	DF	3 February 1989 (aged 30)	Legion Dynamo Makhachkala	2018		5	0
Midfielders
6	Ruslan Avagyan	(Armenia)	MF	24 June 1995 (aged 22)	Youth team	2016		55	1
8	Sargis Shahinyan	(Armenia)	MF	10 September 1995 (aged 22)	Alashkert	2019		12	0
11	Artem Simonyan	(Armenia)	MF	20 February 1995 (aged 23)	Alashkert	2019		15	6
15	Andriy Yakovlyev	(Ukraine)	MF	20 February 1989 (aged 29)	Volyn Lutsk	2019		10	0
17	Zaven Badoyan	(Armenia)	MF	22 December 1989 (aged 28)	Shabab Al Sahel	2019		33	5
21	Andranik Kocharyan (vice-captain)	(Armenia)	MF	29 January 1994 (aged 25)	Kotayk	2017		43	5
23	Dejan Vukomanović	(Serbia)	MF	31 October 1990 (aged 27)	Novi Pazar	2019		13	1
	Stepan Harutyunyan	(Armenia)	MF	11 July 1997 (aged 20)	Lori	2019		1	0
	Karen Shirkhanyan	(Armenia)	MF	6 April 2000 (aged 18)	Youth team	2019		1	0
	Mpumelelo Zwane	(South Africa)	MF	28 July 1996 (aged 21)		2019		1	0
Forwards
10	Razmik Hakobyan	(Armenia)	FW	9 February 1996 (aged 23)	Alashkert	2019		11	1
19	Sargis Metoyan	(Armenia)	FW	6 September 1997 (aged 21)	Dvin Artashat	2016		58	5
	Orbeli Hamvardzumyan	(Armenia)	FW	26 March 1996 (aged 23)	Banants	2018		34	4
	Mikael Arustamyan	(Armenia)	FW	18 January 1996 (aged 23)	Banants	2016		1	0
Away on loan
Left during the season
2	Maksim Starkov	(Russia)	DF	25 April 1996 (aged 22)	Krasnodar	2018		5	0
3	David Azin	(Germany)	MF	11 January 1990 (aged 28)		2018		11	0
8	Anthony Trajkoski	(Australia)	MF	28 April 1998 (aged 20)		2018		18	0
10	Garegin Kirakosyan	(Armenia)	MF	26 November 1995 (aged 22)	Kotayk	2017		50	5
14	Dmitri Ostrovski	(Russia)	FW	15 April 1998 (aged 20)	Vulkan Moskau	2018		15	0
14	Andrey Chukhley	(Belarus)	MF	2 October 1987 (aged 30)	Dnepr Mogilev	2019		3	0
15	Dmitri Malyaka	(Russia)	DF	15 January 1990 (aged 28)	Luch Vladivostok	2018		9	2
16	Sergey Mkrtchyan	(Armenia)	DF	20 May 1995 (aged 23)	Ulisses	2016		37	1
18	David Zakharyan	(Armenia)	MF	8 August 1997 (aged 20)	Erebuni	2018		5	0
18	Aboubacar Gassama	(France)	DF	27 April 1994 (aged 24)		2019		4	0
18	Sim Woon-sub	(South Korea)	MF	24 February 1990 (aged 28)	PDRM	2019		6	0
22	Hossin Lagoun	(Algeria)	GK	4 December 1995 (aged 22)	loan from AFC Eskilstuna	2019	2019	0	0
23	Roni	(Brazil)	FW	2 March 1997 (aged 21)	Apis Jędrzychowice	2018		8	0
25	Alan Tatayev	(Russia)	DF	3 August 1995 (aged 22)	Kolomna	2018		9	0
25	Pape Demba Dieye	(Senegal)	MF	25 March 1998 (aged 20)		2018		9	1
99	Vyacheslav Marikoda	(Russia)	GK	27 March 1991 (aged 27)	Druzhba Maykop	2018		8	0
	Armen Derdzyan	(Armenia)	MF	17 November 1993 (aged 24)	Youth team	2017		27	0
	Rostislav Golovach	(Russia)	MF	4 July 1996 (aged 21)	Artsakh	2018		0	0
	Ebot Derrick Ayuk Oru	(Senegal)	MF		Njalla Quan Sport Academy	2018		0	0

== Transfers ==
=== In ===
Date	Position	Nationality	Name	From	Fee	Ref.
27 July 2018	GK	(Russia)	Mikhail Petrushchenkov	Zelenograd	Undisclosed	
27 July 2018	MF	(Armenia)	David Zakharyan			
27 July 2018	MF	(Cameroon)	Ebot Derrick Ayuk Oru	Njalla Quan Sport Academy	Undisclosed	
27 July 2018	MF	(Russia)	Rostislav Golovach	Artsakh	Undisclosed	
27 July 2018	MF	(Russia)	Fyodor Stukalov	Lokomotiv Moscow	Undisclosed	
27 July 2018	MF	(Senegal)	Pape Demba Dieye			
27 July 2018	FW	(Russia)	Dmitri Ostrovski			
4 August 2018	DF	(Russia)	Dmitri Malyaka	Luch Vladivostok	Undisclosed	
4 August 2018	DF	(Russia)	Alan Tatayev	Kolomna	Undisclosed	
4 August 2018	MF	(Armenia)	Zaven Badoyan	Shabab Al-Sahel	Undisclosed	
4 August 2018	FW	(Brazil)	Roni	Apis Jędrzychowice	Undisclosed	
5 August 2018	GK	(Russia)	Vyacheslav Marikoda	Druzhba Maykop	Undisclosed	
5 August 2018	DF	(Russia)	Magomed Abidinov	Legion-Dynamo Makhachkala	Undisclosed	
5 August 2018	DF	(Russia)	Maksim Starkov	Krasnodar	Undisclosed	
27 August 2018	MF	(Germany)	David Azin			
3 December 2018	MF	(Armenia)	Artem Simonyan	Alashkert	Undisclosed	
7 December 2018	FW	(Armenia)	Razmik Hakobyan	Alashkert	Undisclosed	
12 January 2019	DF	(Russia)	Matvey Guyganov	Sevastopol	Undisclosed	
23 January 2019	DF	(Russia)	Andriy Yakovlyev	Znamya Truda Orekhovo-Zuyevo	Undisclosed	
23 January 2019	MF	(Serbia)	Dejan Vukomanović	Novi Pazar	Undisclosed	
23 January 2019	MF	(Belarus)	Andrey Chukhley	Dnepr Mogilev	Undisclosed	
26 January 2019	DF	(Belgium)	Kevin Ntika	Trakai	Undisclosed	
26 January 2019	MF	(South Africa)	Mpumelelo Zwane			
30 January 2019	MF	(South Korea)	Sim Woon-sub	PDRM	Undisclosed	
1 February 2019	DF	(Armenia)	Hayk Sargsyan	Gandzasar Kapan	Undisclosed	
1 February 2019	MF	(Armenia)	Stepan Harutyunyan	Lori	Undisclosed	
8 February 2019	DF	(Ukraine)	Mykhaylo Kaluhin	Isloch Minsk Raion	Undisclosed	
13 February 2019	MF	(Armenia)	Sargis Shahinyan	Alashkert	Free	
21 February 2019	DF	(France)	Aboubacar Gassama	Ekenäs IF	Free	

=== Loans in ===
Start date	Position	Nationality	Name	To	End date	Ref.
13 February 2019	GK	(Algeria)	Hossin Lagoun	AFC Eskilstuna	20 May 2019	

=== Released ===
Date	Position	Nationality	Name	Joined	Date	Ref
4 August 2018	GK	(Armenia)	Arman Meliksetyan	Artsakh		
4 August 2018	DF	(Armenia)	Argishti Petrosyan	Artsakh		
4 August 2018	FW	(Armenia)	Gegham Tumbaryan	Lokomotiv Yerevan		
2 October 2018	GK	(Russia)	Vyacheslav Marikoda			
2 October 2018	DF	(Russia)	Dmitri Malyaka	Gomel		
2 October 2018	DF	(Russia)	Maksim Starkov			
2 October 2018	DF	(Russia)	Alan Tatayev	Artsakh		
2 October 2018	MF	(Armenia)	David Zakharyan			
18 December 2018	MF	(Armenia)	Armen Derdzyan	Junior Sevan		
18 December 2018	MF	(Armenia)	Garegin Kirakosyan	Sfântul Gheorghe		
18 December 2018	MF	(Armenia)	Sergey Mkrtchyan			
18 December 2018	FW	(Brazil)	Roni	Kalteng Putra	15 April 2019	
18 December 2018	FW	(Russia)	Dmitri Ostrovski	Alay Osh		
31 December 2018	MF	(Armenia)	Arman Zeinalyan			
31 December 2018	MF	(Russia)	Fyodor Stukalov			
31 December 2018	MF	(Senegal)	Pape Demba Dieye	Yerevan	4 September 2019	
31 December 2018	FW	(Armenia)	Hovhannes Papazyan			
12 February 2019	MF	(Germany)	David Azin	Persela Lamongan		
19 March 2019	MF	(Belarus)	Andrey Chukhley	Slavia Mozyr		
20 May 2019	DF	(France)	Aboubacar Gassama			
20 May 2019	MF	(Australia)	Anthony Trajkoski	Smederevo 1924		
20 May 2019	MF	(South Korea)	Sim Woon-sub	Gimpo Citizen		
30 June 2019	GK	(Armenia)	Edvard Hovhannisyan			
30 June 2019	DF	(Armenia)	Vardan Arzoyan	Gandzasar Kapan		
30 June 2019	DF	(Armenia)	Vahe Chopuryan			
30 June 2019	DF	(Armenia)	Gor Poghosyan	Alashkert		
30 June 2019	DF	(Armenia)	Volodya Samsonyan	BKMA Yerevan		
30 June 2019	DF	(Armenia)	Hayk Sargsyan	Aragats		
30 June 2019	DF	(Belgium)	Kevin Ntika	Pepingen-Halle	2 January 2020	
30 June 2019	DF	(Russia)	Matvey Guyganov	Palanga		
30 June 2019	DF	(Russia)	Magomed Abidinov	Legion Dynamo Makhachkala		
30 June 2019	DF	(Ukraine)	Mykhaylo Kaluhin	Dnyapro Mogilev		
30 June 2019	MF	(Armenia)	Sargis Shahinyan	Alashkert	8 July 2019	
30 June 2019	MF	(Armenia)	Artem Simonyan	Pyunik		
30 June 2019	MF	(Russia)	Rostislav Golovach			
30 June 2019	MF	(Russia)	Valeri Yaroshenko	Ararat Moscow		
30 June 2019	MF	(Senegal)	Ebot Derrick Ayuk Oru			
30 June 2019	MF	(Serbia)	Dejan Vukomanović			
30 June 2019	MF	(South Africa)	Mpumelelo Zwane			
30 June 2019	MF	(Ukraine)	Andriy Yakovlyev	Palanga		
30 June 2019	FW	(Armenia)	Mikayel Arustamyan			
30 June 2019	FW	(Armenia)	Orbeli Hambardzumyan	Alay Osh		
30 June 2019	FW	(Armenia)	Andranik Kocharyan	Gandzasar Kapan		
30 June 2019	FW	(Armenia)	Sargis Metoyan			

== Competitions ==
=== Armenian Premier League ===
==== Results ====
5 August 2018 1	Ararat Yerevan	0 – 1	Alashkert	Yerevan
17:00 (UTC+4)	S.Mkrtchyan (yellow card) 53'; R.Avagyan (yellow card) 54'; V.Chopuryan (yellow card) 67'; V.Arzoyan (yellow card) 67'; G.Poghosyan (yellow card) 75'	Report	Simonyan (yellow card) 48'; Stojković 58'; Poghosyan (yellow card) 66'; Arta.Yedigaryan (yellow card) 70'	Stadium: Alashkert Stadium; Attendance: 500; Referee: Gevorg Eghoyan

12 August 2018 2	Ararat-Armenia	1 – 2	Ararat Yerevan	Yerevan
19:00 (UTC+4)	Dimitrov 21'; Pustozerov (yellow card) 37'	Report	Badoyan 16'; Mkoyan 46' (o.g.); Abidinov (yellow card) 71'	Stadium: Vazgen Sargsyan Republican Stadium; Attendance: 300; Referee: Artur Simonyan

19 August 2018 3	Ararat Yerevan	0 – 0	Shirak	Yerevan
16:30 (UTC+4)	G.Poghosyan (yellow card) 29'; R.Safaryan (yellow card) 72'; D.Zakharyan (yellow card) 85'	Report	A.Muradyan (yellow card) 45+1'; R.Mkrtchyan (yellow card) 77'	Stadium: Alashkert Stadium; Attendance: 300; Referee: Henrik Nalbandyan

22 August 2018 4	Artsakh	1 – 1	Ararat Yerevan	Yerevan
14:00 (UTC+4)	E.Yeghiazaryan (yellow card) 43'; H.Asoyan (yellow card) 67'; E.Avagyan 82'	Report	Tatayev (yellow card) 50'; R.Safaryan (yellow card) 60'; V.Arzoyan (yellow card) 62'; Badoyan 63'; R.Avagyan (yellow card) 72'	Stadium: Mika Stadium; Attendance: 300; Referee: Artur Simonyan

25 August 2018 5	Ararat Yerevan	2 – 4	Banants	Yerevan
16:00 (UTC+4)	G.Poghosyan (yellow card) 46'; A.Kocharyan 51'; O.Hambardzumyan 80'	Report	Asamoah 11' (yellow card) 54'; V.Ayvazyan 22', 44'; Kpodo 58'	Stadium: Alashkert Stadium; Attendance: 300; Referee: Gevorg Eghoyan

29 August 2018 6	Lori	1 – 0	Ararat Yerevan	Vanadzor
16:00 (UTC+4)	U.Iwu (yellow card) 67'; A.Azatyan (yellow card) 76'; U.Etop (yellow card) 81'; Désiré 88'	Report	G.Kirakosyan (yellow card) 63'; Malyaka (yellow card) 77'	Stadium: Vanadzor Football Academy; Attendance: 400; Referee: Artur Safaryan

16 September 2018 7	Ararat Yerevan	1 – 3	Pyunik	Yerevan
14:00 (UTC+4)	Malyaka (yellow card) 6' (goal) 38' (pen.); R.Safaryan (yellow card) 86'; Azin (yellow card) 88'	Report	Avetisyan 7'; Voynov (yellow card) 7' (goal) 51'; Trusevych 34'; Dmitriyev (yellow card) 83'	Stadium: Alashkert Stadium; Attendance: 200; Referee: Ashot Ghaltakchyan

22 September 2018 8	Gandzasar Kapan	4 – 0	Ararat Yerevan	Yerevan
19:00 (UTC+4)	Musonda 24', 38'; Diarrassouba 30'; D.Terteryan (yellow card) 67'; M.Manasyan 78'	Report	V.Arzoyan (yellow card) 44'	Stadium: Football Academy Stadium; Attendance: 300; Referee: Zaven Hovhannisyan

30 September 2018 9	Alashkert	2 – 1	Ararat Yerevan	Yerevan
15:00 (UTC+4)	Nenadović 25', 78'; Grigoryan (yellow card) 27'; Marmentini (yellow card) 65'	Report	A.Kocharyan 67'; Malyaka (yellow card) 87'	Stadium: Alashkert Stadium; Attendance: 500; Referee: Gevorg Eghoyan

7 October 2018 10	Ararat Yerevan	0 – 1	Ararat-Armenia	Yerevan
15:00 (UTC+4)		Report	Oslonovsky 42'; Malakyan (yellow card) 47'	Stadium: Alashkert Stadium; Attendance: 500; Referee: Suren Baliyan

20 October 2018 11	Shirak	1 – 0	Ararat Yerevan	Gyumri
15:00 (UTC+4)	Gogichayev 25'; A.Shakhnazaryan (yellow card) 73'; Mikaelyan (yellow card) 79'; Shabani (yellow card) 79'	Report	A.Trajkoski (yellow card) 23'; R.Safaryan (yellow card) 43'	Stadium: Gyumri City Stadium; Attendance: 300; Referee: Suren Baliyan

27 October 2018 12	Ararat Yerevan	0 – 0	Artsakh	Yerevan
15:00 (UTC+4)	R.Safaryan (yellow card) 27'	Report	A.Petrosyan (yellow card) 18'; E.Nazaryan (yellow card) 64'; H.Asoyan (yellow card) 78'; E.Avagyan (yellow card) 86'	Stadium: Alashkert Stadium; Attendance: 150; Referee: Artur Safaryan

31 October 2018 13	Ararat Yerevan	0 – 2	Banants	Yerevan
15:00 (UTC+4)		Report	Asamoah 12'; Stanojević (yellow card) 66'	Stadium: Alashkert Stadium; Attendance: 150; Referee: Artur Simonyan

4 November 2018 14	Ararat Yerevan	2 – 2	Lori	Yerevan
15:00 (UTC+4)	S.Metoyan 74'; G.Poghosyan 90+4'; V.Arzoyan (yellow card) 90+5'	Report	Désiré 65' (pen.) (yellow card) 90+5'; I.Fuseini (yellow card) 78'; N.Francis 86'; I.Aliyu (yellow card) 90+2'	Stadium: Alashkert Stadium; Attendance: 300; Referee: Artur Safaryan

25 November 2018 15	Pyunik	0 – 1	Ararat Yerevan	Yerevan
15:00 (UTC+4)	V.Hayrapetyan (yellow card) 73'; R.Hakobyan (yellow card) 82'	Report	O.Hambardzumyan (yellow card) 35'; Badoyan (yellow card) 57'; A.Kocharyan 82'	Stadium: Vazgen Sargsyan Republican Stadium; Attendance: 500; Referee: Suren Baliyan

28 November 2018 16	Ararat Yerevan	0 – 2	Gandzasar Kapan	Yerevan
14:00 (UTC+4)	V.Arzoyan (yellow card) 34'; G.Kirakosyan (yellow card) 45'	Report	M.Manasyan 12'; G.Poghosyan 24' (o.g.); V.Minasyan (yellow card) 43'	Stadium: Alashkert Stadium; Attendance: 100; Referee: Artur Safaryan

2 December 2018 17	Ararat Yerevan	1 – 0	Alashkert	Yerevan
14:00 (UTC+4)	G.Poghosyan 8'; V.Arzoyan (yellow card) 20' (yellow-red card) 45'; R.Avagyan (yellow card) 83'; Petrushchenkov (yellow card) 90+8'; A.Trajkoski (yellow card) 90+8'	Report	Nenadović (yellow card) 27'; Grigoryan (yellow card) 30'	Stadium: Alashkert Stadium; Attendance: 300; Referee: Gevorg Eghoyan

2 March 2019 18	Ararat-Armenia	4 – 1	Ararat Yerevan	Yerevan
14:00 (UTC+4)	Bougouhi 11', 51'; Khozin (yellow card) 27'; Pashov (yellow card) 49'; Kódjo (yellow card) 69'; Kobyalko 84'; Avetisyan 90'	Report	Kaluhin (yellow card) 4'; Simonyan 62' (pen.)	Stadium: Vazgen Sargsyan Republican Stadium; Attendance: 300; Referee: Zaven Hovhannisyan

6 March 2019 19	Ararat Yerevan	0 – 2	Shirak	Yerevan
15:00 (UTC+4)	G.Poghosyan (yellow card) 75'	Report	K.Ntika 16' (o.g.); M.Bakayoko 48' (pen.); D.Ghandilyan (yellow card) 51'	Stadium: Banants Artificial Field; Attendance: 300

10 March 2019 20	Artsakh	0 – 0	Ararat Yerevan	Yerevan
14:00 (UTC+4)	Gyozalyan (yellow card) 31'	Report	Gassama (yellow card) 17'; Vukomanović (yellow card) 33'	Stadium: Pyunik Training Centre; Attendance: 200; Referee: Artur Simonyan

17 March 2019 21	Banants	3 – 1	Ararat Yerevan	Yerevan
14:00 (UTC+4)	Kobzar 23'; K.Melkonyan 31' (yellow card) 69'; H. Hakobyan (yellow card) 50'; Darbinyan (yellow card) 77'; Udo (yellow card) 79'; A.Glisic 88'	Report	R.Safaryan (yellow card) 14'; Simonyan 49'; G.Poghosyan (yellow card) 56'; S.Metoyan (yellow card) 79'; S.Shahinyan (yellow card) 90+3'	Stadium: Banants Stadium; Attendance: 250; Referee: Henrik Nalbandyan

31 March 2019 22	Lori	2 – 2	Ararat Yerevan	Yerevan
15:00 (UTC+4)	N.Antwi 26'; Désiré 39'; U.Iwu (yellow card) 45+1'	Report	V.Arzoyan 60'; S.Metoyan 69'; M.Guyganov (yellow card) 74'; R.Hakobyan (yellow card) 79'	Stadium: Pyunik Training Centre; Attendance: 200; Referee: Asot Ghaltakchyan

11 April 2019 23	Ararat Yerevan	1 – 2	Pyunik	Yerevan
15:00 (UTC+4)	R.Avagyan (yellow card) 67'; Simonyan 77'	Report	Trusevych (yellow card) 10'; Zhestokov (yellow card) 73'; Usman 83'; Vardanyan 88'	Stadium: Banants-3; Attendance: 200; Referee: Henrik Nalbandyan

14 April 2019 24	Gandzasar Kapan	1 – 0	Ararat Yerevan	Yerevan
16:00 (UTC+4)	H.Asoyan (yellow card) 6'; Harutyunyan 39'	Report	Kaluhin (red card) 20'; M.Guyganov (yellow card) 70'; K.Ntika (yellow card) 79'; Badoyan (yellow card) 85'	Stadium: Yerevan Football Academy Stadium; Attendance: 200; Referee: Ashot Ghaltakchyan

19 April 2019 25	Alashkert	2 – 0	Ararat Yerevan	Yerevan
15:00 (UTC+4)	Poghosyan 6'; Damahou 23'; Voskanyan (yellow card) 27'	Report	Simonyan (yellow card) 81'	Stadium: Alashkert Stadium; Attendance: 300; Referee: Gevorg Eghoyan

26 April 2019 26	Ararat Yerevan	2 – 6	Ararat-Armenia	Yerevan
16:00 (UTC+4)	K.Ntika (yellow card) 53'; Simonyan 60'; Kaluhin (yellow card) 79'; Vukomanović 85'	Report	Kobyalko 14'; Khozin 19'; Pustozyorov (yellow card) 30'; Avetisyan 31', 55'; Louis (yellow card) 69'; Mailson 70'; Danielyan 90+1'	Stadium: Banants-3 Stadium; Attendance: 210; Referee: Gevorg Eghoyan

2 May 2019 27	Shirak	3 – 0	Ararat Yerevan	Gyumri
16:00 (UTC+4)	M.Bakayoko 53'; Gevorkyan (yellow card) 58' (goal) 62'; A.Muradyan 72'	Report	M.Guyganov (yellow card) 6'	Stadium: Gyumri Football Academy; Attendance: 400; Referee: Ashot Ghaltakchyan

6 May 2019 28	Ararat Yerevan	2 – 1	Artsakh	Yerevan
16:00 (UTC+4)	Simonyan 11' (pen.); Badoyan 67'; Kaluhin (red card) 85'; R.Hakobyan (yellow card) 90+1'; P.Ayvazyan (yellow card) 90+5'	Report	A.Meliksetyan (yellow card) 10'; Gareginyan (yellow card) 31'; Hovhannisyan (yellow card) 37'; V.Bakalyan 45'; E.Yeghiazaryan (red card) 85'	Stadium: Banants-3 Stadium; Attendance: 200; Referee: Artur Safaryan

10 May 2019 29	Banants	1 – 1	Ararat Yerevan	Yerevan
19:30 (UTC+4)	A.Glisic 15' (yellow card) 36'; V.Ayvazyan (yellow card) 73'; Ayrapetyan (yellow card) 90+4'	Report	A.Kocharyan 31'; Yakovlyev (yellow card) 62'; M.Guyganov (yellow card) 90+6'	Stadium: Banants Stadium; Attendance: 300; Referee: Artur Simonyan

14 May 2019 30	Ararat Yerevan	1 – 0	Lori	Yerevan
16:00 (UTC+4)	G.Poghosyan (yellow card) 45'; R.Hakobyan (yellow card) 47' (goal) 70'; Vukomanović (yellow card) 90'	Report	Ingbede (yellow card) 14'	Stadium: Banants Stadium-3; Attendance: 200; Referee: Gevorg Eghoyan

26 May 2019 31	Pyunik	2 – 1	Ararat Yerevan	Yerevan
17:00 (UTC+4)	Mkrtchyan 33'; Miranyan 39'; Trusevych (yellow card) 88'	Report	V.Arzoyan (yellow card) 26'; Badoyan 43'; M.Guyganov (yellow card) 51'	Stadium: Yerevan Football Academy Stadium; Attendance: 600; Referee: Antonio Mateu Lahoz

30 May 2019 32	Ararat Yerevan	1 – 7	Gandzasar Kapan	Yerevan
17:00 (UTC+4)	Simonyan 54' (pen.); Abidinov (yellow card) 58'	Report	A.Magallanes (yellow card) 1'; Harutyunyan 5', 21', 30' (pen.), 68' (yellow card) 58'; Adamyan 13'; D.Minasyan 19'; M.Manasyan 77'	Stadium: Pyunik Training Centre; Attendance: 100; Referee: Artur Safaryan

==== Table ====
Pos	Team	Pld	W	D	L	GF	GA	GD	Pts	Qualification or relegation
1	Ararat-Armenia (C)	32	18	7	7	53	28	+25	61	Qualification for the Champions League first qualifying round
2	Pyunik	32	18	6	8	46	32	+14	60	Qualification for the Europa League first qualifying round (Note: Alashkert qualified for the Europa League first qualifying round by winning the 2018–19 Armenian Cup.)
3	Banants	32	14	10	8	43	35	+8	52	Qualification for the Europa League first qualifying round
4	Alashkert	32	15	6	11	37	27	+10	51	Qualification for the Europa League first qualifying round
5	Lori	32	11	11	10	42	40	+2	44	
6	Gandzasar	32	10	8	14	38	33	+5	38	
7	Shirak	32	7	15	10	26	30	−4	36	
8	Artsakh	32	6	10	16	25	49	−24	28	
9	Ararat Yerevan	32	5	7	20	24	60	−36	22	

Source: Soccerway
Rules for classification: 1) Points; 2) Play-off (only if deciding champion); 3) Matches won; 4) Head-to-head points; 5) Head-to-head matches won; 6) Head-to-head goal difference; 7) Head-to-head goals scored; 8) Head-to-head away goals scored; 9) Goal difference; 10) Goals scored.
(C) Champions

=== Armenian Cup ===
19 September 2018 First Round 1st leg	Lokomotiv Yerevan	1 – 1	Ararat Yerevan	Yerevan
15:00 (UTC+4)	Malyaka 20' (o.g.); A.Kocharyan (yellow card) 84'	Report	Azin (yellow card) 13'; Malyaka 59' (pen.) (yellow card) 90'; D.Zakharyan (yellow card) 77'	Stadium: Mika Stadium; Attendance: 200; Referee: Ashot Ghaltakchyan

3 October 2018 First Round 2nd leg	Ararat Yerevan	3 – 1 (4 – 2 agg.)	Lokomotiv Yerevan	Yerevan
14:00 (UTC+4)	R.Avagyan 17'; G.Kirakosyan 28'; Badoyan 29'	Report	G.Mkrtumyan (yellow card) 27'; K.Manukyan 64'; D.Margaryan (yellow card) 90+1'	Stadium: Alashkert Stadium; Attendance: 200; Referee: Artur Simonyan

24 October 2018 Second Round 1st leg	Banants	3 – 1	Ararat Yerevan	Yerevan
15:00 (UTC+4)	A.Abdullahi 16', 90+4'; A.Loretsyan (yellow card) 25' (goal) 28'; Kpodo (yellow card) 22' (yellow-red card) 60'; Solovyov (yellow card) 88'	Report	V.Chopuryan (yellow card) 54'; G.Kirakosyan (yellow card) 74'; P.Dieye 79'	Stadium: Banants Stadium; Attendance: 150; Referee: Henrik Nalbandyan

8 November 2018 Second Round 2nd leg	Ararat Yerevan	0 – 1 (1 – 4 agg.)	Banants	Yerevan
14:00 (UTC+4)	G.Poghosyan (yellow card) 3'; V.Chopuryan (red card)	Report	E.Petrosyan 50'	Stadium: Alashkert Stadium; Attendance: 150; Referee: Artur Simonyan

== Statistics ==
As of match played 30 May 2019

=== Appearances and goals ===
No.	Pos	Nat	Player	Total		Premier League		Armenian Cup	
No.	Pos	Nat	Player	Apps	Goals	Apps	Goals	Apps	Goals
1	GK	(Russia) RUS	Mikhail Petrushchenkov	23	0	20	0	3	0
3	DF	(Russia) RUS	Matvey Guyganov	13	0	13	0	0	0
4	DF	(Belgium) BEL	Kevin Ntika	9	0	8+1	0	0	0
5	DF	(Armenia) ARM	Vardan Arzoyan	29	1	25+1	1	3	0
6	MF	(Armenia) ARM	Ruslan Avagyan	23	1	16+4	0	3	1
7	DF	(Armenia) ARM	Gor Poghosyan	30	2	24+2	2	4	0
10	FW	(Armenia) ARM	Razmik Hakobyan	11	1	2+9	1	0	0
11	MF	(Armenia) ARM	Artem Simonyan	15	6	12+3	6	0	0
14	DF	(Ukraine) UKR	Mykhaylo Kaluhin	7	0	7	0	0	0
15	MF	(Ukraine) UKR	Andriy Yakovlyev	10	0	7+3	0	0	0
17	MF	(Armenia) ARM	Zaven Badoyan	33	5	23+6	4	4	1
19	FW	(Armenia) ARM	Sargis Metoyan	24	2	11+9	2	2+2	0
20	DF	(Armenia) ARM	Rafael Safaryan	32	0	29+1	0	2	0
21	MF	(Armenia) ARM	Andranik Kocharyan	35	4	26+5	4	4	0
23	MF	(Serbia) SRB	Dejan Vukomanović	13	1	10+3	1	0	0
25	MF	(Senegal) SEN	Pape Demba Dieye	9	1	0+6	0	0+3	1
	GK	(Armenia) ARM	Poghos Ayvazyan	6	0	5+1	0	0	0
	DF	(Armenia) ARM	Vahe Chopuryan	10	0	7	0	3	0
	DF	(Armenia) ARM	Volodya Samsonyan	8	0	2+4	0	1+1	0
	DF	(Armenia) ARM	Hayk Sargsyan	2	0	1+1	0	0	0
	DF	(Russia) RUS	Magomed Abidinov	5	0	5	0	0	0
	MF	(Armenia) ARM	Stepan Harutyunyan	1	0	0+1	0	0	0
	MF	(Armenia) ARM	Sargis Shahinyan	12	0	12	0	0	0
	MF	(Armenia) ARM	Karen Shirkhanyan	1	0	1	0	0	0
	MF	(South Africa) RSA	Mpumelelo Zwane	1	0	1	0	0	0
	FW	(Armenia) ARM	Mikayel Arustamyan	1	0	0+1	0	0	0
	FW	(Armenia) ARM	Orbeli Hambardzumyan	22	1	14+5	1	3	0
Players who left Ararat Yerevan during the season:
2	DF	(Russia) RUS	Maksim Starkov	5	0	4	0	0+1	0
3	MF	(Germany) GER	David Azin	11	0	7+1	0	3	0
8	MF	(Australia) AUS	Anthony Trajkoski	12	0	8+2	0	2	0
10	FW	(Armenia) ARM	Garegin Kirakosyan	19	1	12+4	0	3	1
14	FW	(Russia) RUS	Dmitri Ostrovski	15	0	4+8	0	1+2	0
15	DF	(Russia) RUS	Dmitri Malyaka	9	2	8	1	1	1
16	MF	(Armenia) ARM	Sergey Mkrtchyan	2	0	2	0	0	0
18	MF	(Armenia) ARM	David Zakharyan	5	0	1+4	0	0	0
18	DF	(France) FRA	Aboubacar Gassama	4	0	4	0	0	0
23	FW	(Brazil) BRA	Roni	8	0	2+4	0	0+2	0
25	DF	(Russia) RUS	Alan Tatayev	9	0	6+2	0	1	0
99	GK	(Russia) RUS	Vyacheslav Marikoda	8	0	7	0	1	0
	MF	(Armenia) ARM	Armen Derdzyan	1	0	0	0	0+1	0
	MF	(Belarus) BLR	Andrey Chukhley	3	0	2+1	0	0	0
	MF	(South Korea) KOR	Sim Woon-sub	6	0	4+2	0	0	0

=== Goal scorers ===
Place	Position	Nation	Number	Name	Premier League	Armenian Cup	Total
1	MF	(Armenia)	11	Artem Simonyan	6	0	6
2	MF	(Armenia)	17	Zaven Badoyan	4	1	5
3	MF	(Armenia)	21	Andranik Kocharyan	4	0	4
4	DF	(Armenia)	7	Gor Poghosyan	2	0	2
4	FW	(Armenia)	19	Sargis Metoyan	2	0	2
4	DF	(Russia)	15	Dmitri Malyaka	1	1	2
7	FW	(Armenia)	11	Orbeli Hambardzumyan	1	0	1
7	DF	(Armenia)	5	Vardan Arzoyan	1	0	1
7	DF	(Serbia)	23	Dejan Vukomanović	1	0	1
7	FW	(Armenia)	10	Razmik Hakobyan	1	0	1
7	MF	(Armenia)	6	Ruslan Avagyan	0	1	1
7	FW	(Armenia)	10	Garegin Kirakosyan	0	1	1
7	MF	(Senegal)	25	Pape Demba Dieye	0	1	1
7				Own goal	1	0	1
				TOTALS	24	5	29

=== Clean sheets ===
Place	Position	Nation	Number	Name	Premier League	Armenian Cup	Total
1	GK	(Russia)	1	Mikhail Petrushchenkov	4	0	4
2	GK	(Russia)	99	Vyacheslav Marikoda	1	0	1
2	GK	(Armenia)		Poghos Ayvazyan	1	0	1
				TOTALS	6	0	6

=== Disciplinary record ===
Number	Nation	Position	Name	Premier League		Armenian Cup		Total	
Number	Nation	Position	Name	Booked	Sent off (straight red)	Booked	Sent off (straight red)	Booked	Sent off (straight red)
1	(Russia)	GK	Mikhail Petrushchenkov	1	0	0	0	1	0
3	(Russia)	DF	Matvey Guyganov	5	0	0	0	5	0
4	(Belgium)	DF	Kevin Ntika	2	0	0	0	2	0
5	(Armenia)	DF	Vardan Arzoyan	8	1	0	0	8	1
6	(Armenia)	MF	Ruslan Avagyan	4	0	0	0	4	0
7	(Armenia)	DF	Gor Poghosyan	6	0	1	0	7	0
10	(Armenia)	FW	Razmik Hakobyan	3	0	0	0	3	0
11	(Armenia)	MF	Artem Simonyan	1	0	0	0	1	0
14	(Ukraine)	DF	Mykhaylo Kaluhin	2	2	0	0	2	2
15	(Ukraine)	MF	Andriy Yakovlyev	1	0	0	0	1	0
17	(Armenia)	MF	Zaven Badoyan	2	0	0	0	2	0
19	(Armenia)	FW	Sargis Metoyan	1	0	0	0	1	0
20	(Armenia)	DF	Rafael Safaryan	6	0	0	0	6	0
23	(Serbia)	MF	Dejan Vukomanović	2	0	0	0	2	0
	(Russia)	GK	Poghos Ayvazyan	1	0	0	0	1	0
	(Russia)	DF	Magomed Abidinov	2	0	0	0	2	0
	(Armenia)	MF	Sargis Shahinyan	1	0	0	0	1	0
	(Armenia)	FW	Orbeli Hambardzumyan	1	0	0	0	1	0
Players who left Ararat Yerevan during the season:
3	(Germany)	MF	David Azin	1	0	1	0	2	0
4	(Armenia)	DF	Vahe Chopuryan	1	0	1	1	2	1
8	(Australia)	MF	Anthony Trajkoski	2	0	0	0	2	0
10	(Armenia)	FW	Garegin Kirakosyan	2	0	1	0	3	0
15	(Armenia)	MF	Sergey Mkrtchyan	1	0	0	0	1	0
15	(Russia)	DF	Dmitri Malyaka	3	0	1	0	4	0
18	(Armenia)	MF	David Zakharyan	1	0	1	0	2	0
18	(France)	DF	Aboubacar Gassama	1	0	0	0	1	0
25	(Russia)	DF	Alan Tatayev	1	0	0	0	1	0
			TOTALS	63	3	6	1	69	4
