= Ararat derby =

Football rivalry in Armenia

The Ararat's derby
- Other names: Ararat derby
- Location: (Armenia) Yerevan
- Teams: Ararat-Armenia; Ararat Yerevan
- First meeting: 11 August 2018; Premier League; Ararat-Armenia 1–2 Ararat Yerevan
- Latest meeting: 25 April 2026; Premier League; Ararat-Armenia 4–0 Ararat Yerevan

Statistics
- Total meetings: 32
- Most wins: Ararat-Armenia (26)
- Most player appearances: Armen Ambartsumyan (25)
- Top scorer: Mailson Lima (7)
- All-time record: Ararat-Armenia: 26; Draw: 3 Ararat Yerevan: 3
- Largest victory: 28 May 2025; Premier League; Ararat-Armenia 6–0 Ararat Yerevan
- Largest goal scoring: 26 April 2019; Premier League; Ararat Yerevan 2–6 Ararat-Armenia
- Longest win streak: 15 games Ararat-Armenia (2021–2024)
- Longest unbeaten streak: 21 games Ararat-Armenia (2021–Present)
- Current unbeaten streak: 21 games Ararat-Armenia (2021–Present)

The Ararat derby is the name given to a football rivalry between Ararat-Armenia and Ararat Yerevan, two clubs based in Yerevan, the capital of Armenia. The match was first contested on 11 August 2018, with Ararat Yerevan winning 2–1.

== Head-to-head ==
Competition	Played	Ararat-Armenia	Draw	Ararat Yerevan	Ararat-Armenia goals	Ararat Yerevan goals
Premier League	29	24	3	2	66	21
Cup	3	2	0	1	6	3
Total	32	26	3	3	72	24

== Results ==
=== League ===
11 August 2018 2018–19	Ararat-Armenia	1–2	Ararat Yerevan	Yerevan
19:00 (UTC+4)	Dimitrov 21'; Pustozerov (yellow card) 37'		Badoyan 16'; Mkoyan 46' (o.g.); Abidinov (yellow card) 71'	Stadium: Republican Stadium; Attendance: 300; Referee: Artur Simonyan

7 October 2018 2018–19	Ararat Yerevan	0–1	Ararat-Armenia	Yerevan
15:00 (UTC+4)			Oslonovsky 42'; Malakyan (yellow card) 47'	Stadium: Alashkert Stadium; Attendance: 500; Referee: Suren Baliyan

2 March 2019 2018–19	Ararat-Armenia	4–1	Ararat Yerevan	Yerevan
14:00 (UTC+4)	Bougouhi 11', 51'; Khozin (yellow card) 27'; Pashov (yellow card) 49'; Kódjo (yellow card) 69'; Kobyalko 84'; Avetisyan 90'		Kaluhin (yellow card) 4'; Simonyan 62' (pen.)	Stadium: FFA Academy Stadium; Attendance: 300; Referee: Zaven Hovhannisyan

26 April 2019 2018–19	Ararat Yerevan	2–6	Ararat-Armenia	Yerevan
16:00 (UTC+4)	Ntika (yellow card) 53'; Simonyan 60'; Kaluhin (yellow card) 79'; Vukomanović 85'		Kobyalko 14'; Khozin 19'; Pustozyorov (yellow card) 30'; Avetisyan 31', 55'; Louis (yellow card) 69'; Mailson 70'; Daniyelyan 90+1'	Stadium: Banants-3 Stadium; Attendance: 210; Referee: Gevorg Eghoyan

18 September 2019 2019–20	Ararat-Armenia	1–0	Ararat Yerevan	Yerevan
17:30 (UTC+4)	Mailson (yellow card) 25' (goal) 66'		Davidyan (yellow card) 41'; Morozov (yellow card) 51'; Kozlov (yellow card) 61'; Aleksanyan (yellow card) 82'	Stadium: FFA Academy Stadium; Attendance: 300; Referee: Zaven Hovhannisyan

2 March 2020 2019–20	Ararat Yerevan	0–3	Ararat-Armenia	Yerevan
14:45 (UTC+4)	James (yellow card) 77'		Otubanjo 7', 17'; Ambartsumyan 35' (yellow card) 84'	Stadium: Republican Stadium; Attendance: 300; Referee: George Vadatchkoria

11 June 2020 2019–20	Ararat-Armenia	4–2	Ararat Yerevan	Yerevan
19:30 (UTC+4)	Vakulenko 22'; Harutyunyan (yellow card) 39'; Mailson 45', 90+4' (yellow card) 68'; Otubanjo 51' (pen.) (yellow card) 63'; Christian (yellow card) 72'; Malakyan (yellow card) 85'		Dedechko 11'; Stepanets (yellow card) 41'; James (yellow card) 48'; Gouffran 56' (o.g.); Spychka (yellow card) 61'; Khurtsidze (yellow card) 90+4'	Stadium: FFA Academy Stadium; Attendance: 0 Referee: Artur Safaryan
Note: Match played behind closed doors due to the COVID-19 pandemic.

6 July 2020 2019–20	Ararat Yerevan	0–1	Ararat-Armenia	Yerevan
20:00 (UTC+4)	Spychka (yellow card) 7'; Stepanets (yellow card) 45'; James (yellow card) 52'; Revyakin (yellow card) 85'		Malakyan (yellow card) 48'; Gouffran (yellow card) 49'; Khachumyan (yellow card) 67'; Otubanjo 88'; Antonov (yellow card) 90+5'	Stadium: FFA Academy Stadium; Attendance: 0 Referee: Ashot Ghaltakchyan
Note: Match played behind closed doors due to the COVID-19 pandemic.

2 December 2020 2020–21	Ararat-Armenia	0–0	Ararat Yerevan	Yerevan
14:30 (UTC+4)	Alemão (yellow card) 86'		Bravo (yellow card) 10'; K.Muradyan (yellow card) 21'	Stadium: FFA Academy Stadium; Attendance: 0 Referee: Shahen Aghayan
Note: Match played behind closed doors due to the COVID-19 pandemic.

25 February 2021 2020–21	Ararat Yerevan	1–0	Ararat-Armenia	Charentsavan
15:00 (UTC+4)	Bravo (yellow card) 45'; Pobulić 72'		Sanogo (yellow card) 17'	Stadium: Charentsavan City Stadium; Attendance: 0 Referee: Zaven Hovhannisyan
Note: Match played behind closed doors due to the COVID-19 pandemic.

19 May 2021 2020–21	Ararat-Armenia	1–1	Ararat Yerevan	Yerevan
15:30 (UTC+4)	Sanogo (yellow card) 8'; Nahapetyan (yellow card) 73'; Karapetyan 74'		Nenadović (yellow card) 13'; Zaderaka 42' (yellow card) 54'	Stadium: FFA Academy Stadium; Attendance: 1,000; Referee: Zaven Hovhannisyan

17 October 2021 2021–22	Ararat-Armenia	3–0	Ararat Yerevan	Yerevan
16:00 (UTC+4)	Lima 61'; Otubanjo 66', 90+6'; Klymenchuk (yellow card) 87'		G.Malakyan (yellow card) 12'; Aliyu (yellow card) 63'; Mkrtchyan (yellow card) 89'	Stadium: FFA Academy Stadium; Referee: Zaven Hovhannisyan

19 February 2022 2021–22	Ararat Yerevan	0–1	Ararat-Armenia	Charentsavan
14:00 (UTC+4)			Lima 28'; Terteryan (yellow card) 59'	Stadium: Charentsavan City Stadium; Referee: Henrik Nalbandyan

15 April 2022 2021–22	Ararat-Armenia	3–1	Ararat Yerevan	Yerevan
15:00 (UTC+4)	Romércio (yellow card) 22' (yellow-red card) 41'; Alemão 27'; Lima 51'; Yermakov 70' (o.g.); Bueno (yellow card) 89'		Ra.Hakobyan 42'; Aliyu (yellow card) 58' (yellow-red card) 63'	Stadium: FFA Academy Stadium; Referee: Vardan Manukyan

28 May 2022 2021–22	Ararat Yerevan	0–1	Ararat-Armenia	Yerevan
19:00 (UTC+4)	Dagrou (yellow card) 88'		Shaghoyan 38'; Terteryan (yellow card) 77'; Romércio (yellow card) 79'	Stadium: Republican Stadium; Referee: Vardan Manukyan

11 August 2022 2022–23	Ararat Yerevan	0–2	Ararat-Armenia	Yerevan
20:00 (UTC+4)	Mkoyan (yellow card) 12'		Firmino 11'; Yenne 39'; Hakobyan (yellow card) 54'	Stadium: Republican Stadium; Referee: Henrik Nalbandian

21 October 2022 2022–23	Ararat-Armenia	2–1	Ararat Yerevan	Yerevan
18:00 (UTC+4)	Eza 34'; Muradyan (yellow card) 40'; Yenne 89'		R.Mkrtchyan 42'; A.Mkrtchyan (yellow card) 68'; Potapov (yellow card) 75'; Arzoyan (yellow card) 90+2'	Stadium: FFA Stadium; Referee: Vardan Manukyan

27 February 2023 2022–23	Ararat Yerevan	1–3	Ararat-Armenia	Charentsavan
15:00 (UTC+4)	Mijić 29'; Babaliev (yellow card) 75'		Pérez 31'; Alemão 37'; Grigoryan (yellow card) 65'; Jibril 78'	Stadium: Charentsavan City Stadium; Referee: Artem Gasparyan

3 May 2023 2022–23	Ararat-Armenia	2–1	Ararat Yerevan	Yerevan
19:00 (UTC+4)	Ambartsumyan 33'; Jibril 51'; Terteryan (yellow card) 64'; Ghazaryan (yellow card) 90+3'		Mkrtchyan (yellow card) 40'; Ransom 45'; Dagrou (yellow card) 77'; Mézague (yellow card) 82'; Faye (yellow card) 83'	Stadium: FFA Stadium; Referee: Zaven Hovhannisyan

30 July 2023 2023–24	Ararat Yerevan	1–3	Ararat-Armenia	Yerevan
20:00 (UTC+4)	da Silva 18' (o.g.); Mzoughi (yellow card) 45+1'; Malakyan (yellow card) 88'		Hakobyan (yellow card) 45'; Gbomadu 63'; Bueno (yellow card) 72'; Yenne 82', 90+5'	Stadium: Republican Stadium; Referee: Vardan Manukyan

29 September 2023 2023–24	Ararat-Armenia	2–1	Ararat Yerevan	Yerevan
17:00 (UTC+4)	Yattara 25'; Ambartsumyan (yellow card) 31'; Gbomadu 81'		Moustapha (yellow card) 72'; Nahapetyan 87'	Stadium: FFA Stadium; Referee: Sargis Khachatryan

5 December 2023 2023–24	Ararat Yerevan	0–1	Ararat-Armenia	Yerevan
16:00 (UTC+4)	Malakyan (yellow card) 36'		Yattara 4'; Alemão (yellow card) 38'	Stadium: Republican Stadium; Referee: Ashot Harutyunyan

12 April 2024 2023–24	Ararat-Armenia	2–1	Ararat Yerevan	Yerevan
19:00 (UTC+4)	Avetisyan (yellow card) 52'; Yattara 59' (pen.); Rodríguez 88'		Moustapha (yellow card) 26'; Grigoryan 45+2'; Mani (yellow card) 54'; Khachumyan (yellow card) 80'; Ransom (yellow card) 90+9'	Stadium: FFA Stadium; Referee: Henrik Nalbandian

18 October 2024 2024–25	Ararat-Armenia	3–2	Ararat Yerevan	Yerevan
18:00 (UTC+4)	Noubissi 19' (pen.), 50', 90+9'; Muradyan (yellow card) 23'; Pavlovets (yellow card) 42'; Queirós (yellow card) 57'		Galstyan 22'; Kante (yellow card) 53'; Kante 65' (pen.); Gomes (yellow card) 85'; Dombila (yellow card) 90+9'	Stadium: FFA Stadium; Referee: Hovhannes Kalantaryan

10 November 2024 2024–25	Ararat Yerevan	0–0	Ararat-Armenia	Yerevan
15:00 (UTC+4)	Faye (yellow card) 63'; Malakyan (yellow card) 65'; Dombila (yellow card) 90+1'; Grigoryan (yellow card) 90+2'; Trémoulet (red card) 90+4'		Yenne (yellow card) 73'; Queirós (yellow card) 90+2'	Stadium: FFA Stadium; Referee: Yura Mahtesyan

28 May 2025 2024–25	Ararat-Armenia	6–0	Ararat Yerevan	Yerevan
19:00 (UTC+4)	Noubissi 29', 61', 79'; Harutyunyan 43'; Yenne 75'; Ambartsumyan 76'; Shaghoyan (yellow card) 88'		Bah (yellow card) 39'; Toure (yellow card) 58'	Stadium: FFA Stadium; Referee: Hovhannes Kalantaryan

30 August 2025 2025–26	Ararat-Armenia	4–2	Ararat Yerevan	Yerevan
19:00 (UTC+4)	Fofana 25' (o.g.); Muradyan (yellow card) 47'; Balanta (yellow card) 58'; Queirós 77'; Bueno (yellow card) 78'; Eloyan 86'; Gbomadu 90'; Hovhannisyan (yellow card) 90+7'		Moustapha 21'; Meite 39'; Khachumyan (yellow card) 62'; Anzimati-Aboudou (yellow card) 78'	Stadium: FFA Stadium; Referee: Sargis Khachatryan

21 November 2025 2025–26	Ararat Yerevan	1–2	Ararat-Armenia	Yerevan
17:00 (UTC+4)	Sogodogo 89'		Ambartsumyan 42'; Ramos (yellow card) 53'; Oliveira 62'	Stadium: Republican Stadium; Referee: Sargis Khachatryan

25 April 2026 2025–26	Ararat-Armenia	4–0	Ararat Yerevan	Abovyan
18:00 (UTC+4)	Serobyan 22', 28', 59'; Balanta (yellow card) 45'; Tera (yellow card) 66'; Ndour 85'		Lima (yellow card) 50'	Stadium: Vahagn Tumasyan Stadium; Referee: Ashot Ghaltakhchyan

=== Cup ===
20 April 2021 2020–21; Semi-final 1st leg	Ararat Yerevan	2–0	Ararat-Armenia	Yerevan
18:30 (UTC+4)	Nenadović 18'; Prljević 48'; Malakyan (yellow card) 55'; Pobulić (yellow card) 89'		Wbeymar (yellow card) 36'; Otubanjo (yellow card) 53'	Stadium: Republican Stadium; Attendance: 400; Referee: Artem Gasparyan

1 May 2021 2020–21; Semi-final 2nd leg	Ararat-Armenia	2–1 (2–3 agg.)	Ararat Yerevan	Yerevan
15:00 (UTC+4)	Gouffran 23'; Otubanjo (yellow card) 45'; Terteryan 78' (yellow card) 90'		Margaryan (yellow card) 56'; Nenadović 72'; Mkoyan (yellow card) 77'	Stadium: FFA Academy Stadium; Attendance: 400; Referee: Zaven Hovhannisyan

4 October 2022 2022–23; First round	Ararat Yerevan	0–4	Ararat-Armenia	Armavir
15:00 (UTC+4)	Mkoyan (yellow card) 36'		Eza 31', 54', 83'; Mkrtchyan (yellow card) 49'; Agdon 89'	Stadium: Armavir City Stadium; Referee: Davit Mkrtchyan

== Player Statistics ==
=== Played for both clubs ===
Ararat-Armenia, then Ararat Yerevan

Player	Pos.	Ararat-Armenia	Ararat Yerevan
(Armenia) Armen Nahapetyan	MF	2017–2023	2023–2025
(Armenia) Robert Darbinyan	DF	2018–2019	2021–2023
(Armenia) Artur Daniyelyan	DF	2018–2021	2021
(Armenia) David Davidyan	MF	2018–2019	2019–2020
(Armenia) Arman Hovhannisyan	DF	2018–2019, 2022–2023	2023, 2025–Present
(Armenia) Hrayr Mkoyan	DF	2018	2020–2023
(Armenia) Gor Malakyan	MF	2018–2020	2021–2025
(Armenia) Albert Khachumyan	DF	2019–2024	2024–Present

Ararat Yerevan, then Ararat-Armenia

Player	Pos.	Ararat Yerevan	Ararat-Armenia
(Serbia) Miloš Stamenković	MF	2013–2014	2022–2023
(Armenia) Sargis Shahinyan	MF	2019	2020–2022
(Russia) Vsevolod Ermakov	GK	2020–2022	2022–2024
(Armenia) Karen Muradyan	MF	2020–2021	2021–Present
(Armenia) Solomon Udo	MF	2020–2021	2022–2023

=== Appearances & Goals ===
	Name	Club	Years	League apps	League goals	Cup apps	Cup goals	Total apps	Total goals	Ratio
1	(Russia) Armen Ambartsumyan	Ararat-Armenia	2018–Present	22	4	3	0	25	4	0.16
2	(Armenia) Karen Muradyan	Ararat Yerevan; Ararat-Armenia	2020–2021; 2021–Present	3; 14	0; 0	2; 1	0; 0	20	0	0
3	(Colombia) Junior Bueno	Ararat-Armenia	2021–Present	16	0	3	0	19	0	0
4	(Armenia) Gor Malakyan	Ararat-Armenia; Ararat Yerevan	2018–2020; 2021–2025	6; 10	0; 1	0; 0	0; 0	17	0	0
4	(Kenya) Alwyn Tera	Ararat-Armenia	2021–Present	17	0	0	0	17	0	0
6	(Russia) Vsevolod Ermakov	Ararat Yerevan; Ararat-Armenia	2020–2022; 2022–2024	7; 5	0; 0	2; 1	0; 0	15	0	0
6	(Brazil) Alemão	Ararat-Armenia	2020–2024	12	2	3	0	15	2	0.13
6	(Cape Verde) Mailson Lima	Ararat-Armenia	2019–2021; 2021–2023	14	7	1	0	15	7	0.47
9	(Armenia) Hrayr Mkoyan	Ararat-Armenia; Ararat Yerevan	2018; 2020–2023	1; 9	0; 3	0; 0	0; 0	13	0	0
10	(Russia) Dmitry Abakumov	Ararat-Armenia	2018–2023	10	0	2	0	12	0	0
10	(Armenia) Artyom Avanesyan	Ararat-Armenia	2018–2024	11	0	1	0	12	0	0
10	(Armenia) David Manoyan	Ararat Yerevan	2020–2023	9	0	3	0	12	0	0
10	(Armenia) Rudik Mkrtchyan	Ararat Yerevan	2021–2024	11	1	1	0	12	1	0.08
10	(Nigeria) Tenton Yenne	Ararat-Armenia	2022–2025	11	5	1	0	12	5	0.42
15	(Armenia) Razmik Hakobyan	Ararat Yerevan	2019–2024	10	1	1	0	11	1	0.09
15	(Netherlands) Furdjel Narsingh	Ararat-Armenia	2019–2022	9	1	2	0	11	1	0.09
15	(Nigeria) Yusuf Otubanjo	Ararat-Armenia	2020–2022	9	6	2	0	11	6	0.55
15	(Colombia) Juan Bravo	Ararat Yerevan	2020–2023	9	0	2	0	11	0	0
15	(Armenia) Zhirayr Shaghoyan	Ararat-Armenia	2017–Present	11	0	0	0	11	0	0
20	(Armenia) Davit Terteryan	Ararat-Armenia	2021–2024	8	0	2	1	10	1	0.1
20	(Armenia) Serob Galstyan	Ararat Yerevan	2022–2025	9	1	1	0	10	1	0.1
20	(Armenia) Artur Serobyan	Ararat-Armenia	2020–Present	9	3	1	0	10	3	0.3
20	(Armenia) Edgar Grigoryan	Ararat-Armenia	2023–Present	10	0	0	0	10	0	0
24	(Russia) David Khurtsidze	Ararat Yerevan	2019–2021	7	0	2	0	9	0	0
24	(Burkina Faso) Zakaria Sanogo	Ararat-Armenia	2019–2022	7	0	2	0	9	0	0
24	(Armenia) Wbeymar Angulo	Ararat-Armenia	2020–2024	6	0	3	0	9	0	0
24	(Ivory Coast) Wilfried Eza	Ararat-Armenia	2021–2023	8	1	1	3	9	4	0.44
24	(Colombia) Jonathan Duarte	Ararat-Armenia	2022–2026	8	0	1	0	9	0	0
24	(Armenia) Albert Khachumyan	Ararat-Armenia; Ararat Yerevan	2019–2024; 2024–Present	4; 4	0; 0	1; 0	0; 0	9	0	0
30	(Armenia) Zaven Badoyan	Ararat Yerevan	2018–2021	8	1	0	0	8	0	0
30	(France) Yoan Gouffran	Ararat-Armenia	2020–2021	6	0	2	1	8	1	0.13
30	(Serbia) Marko Prljević	Ararat Yerevan	2020–2022	6	0	2	1	8	1	0.13
30	(Nigeria) Matthew Gbomadu	Ararat-Armenia	2023–2026	8	3	0	0	8	3	0.38
30	(Armenia) Armen Nahapetyan	Ararat-Armenia; Ararat Yerevan	2017–2022; 2023–2025	3; 4	0; 1	1; 0	0; 0	8	1	0.13
30	(Armenia) Volodya Samsonyan	Ararat Yerevan	2018–2019, 2023–Present	8	0	0	0	8	0	0
36	(Nigeria) Isah Aliyu	Ararat Yerevan	2021–2023	6	0	1	0	7	0	0
36	(Armenia) Alik Arakelyan	Ararat Yerevan	2021–2023	6	0	1	0	7	0	0
36	(Armenia) Solomon Udo	Ararat Yerevan; Ararat-Armenia	2020–2021; 2022–2023	1; 6	0; 0	0; 0	0; 0	7	0	0
36	(Senegal) Alassane Faye	Ararat Yerevan	2023–2026	7	0	0	0	7	0	0
36	(Cameroon) Hadji Issa Moustapha	Ararat Yerevan	2023–2026	7	1	0	0	7	1	0.14
36	(Armenia) Hakob Hakobyan	Ararat-Armenia	2022–2026	6	0	1	0	7	0	0
42	(Russia) Anton Kobyalko	Ararat-Armenia	2018–2020	6	2	0	0	6	2	0.33
42	(Russia) Sergei Revyakin	Ararat Yerevan	2019–2020, 2023	6	0	0	0	6	0	0
42	(Armenia) Hovhannes Harutyunyan	Ararat-Armenia	2019–2021, 2024–2025	6	1	0	0	6	1	0.17
42	(Armenia) Edgar Malakyan	Ararat Yerevan	2020–2022	5	0	1	0	6	0	0
42	(Kenya) Amos Nondi	Ararat-Armenia	2023–2025	6	0	0	0	6	0	0
42	(Comoros) Kassim Hadji	Ararat Yerevan	2023–2025	6	0	0	0	6	0	0
42	(Mali) Kalifala Doumbia	Ararat Yerevan	2019–2021	6	0	0	0	6	0	0
42	(Armenia) Artur Grigoryan	Ararat Yerevan	2024–2025, 2025	6	1	0	0	6	1	0.17
50	(Russia) Dmitry Guz	Ararat-Armenia	2018–2020	5	0	0	0	5	0	0
50	(Ivory Coast) Kódjo	Ararat-Armenia	2019–2020	5	0	0	0	5	0	0
50	(Haiti) Alex Junior	Ararat-Armenia	2019–2021	5	0	0	0	5	0	0
50	(Ukraine) Ivan Spychka	Ararat Yerevan	2019–2021	5	0	0	0	5	0	0
50	(Ukraine) Serhiy Vakulenko	Ararat-Armenia	2020–2022	3	1	2	0	5	1	0.2
50	(Armenia) Aghvan Papikyan	Ararat Yerevan	2020–2021	3	0	2	0	5	0	0
50	(Serbia) Uroš Nenadović	Ararat Yerevan	2020–2021	3	0	2	2	5	2	0.4
50	(Serbia) Dimitrije Pobulić	Ararat Yerevan	2021–2022	3	1	2	0	5	1	0.2
50	(Armenia) Robert Darbinyan	Ararat-Armenia; Ararat Yerevan	2018–2019; 2021–2023	0; 4	0; 0	0; 1	0; 0	5	0	0
50	(Armenia) Artur Daniyelyan	Ararat-Armenia; Ararat Yerevan	2018–2021; 2021	2; 1	0; 0	0; 2	0; 0	5	0	0
50	(Ivory Coast) Dimitri Legbo	Ararat Yerevan	2021–2023	4	0	1	0	5	0	0
50	(Armenia) Hayk Ishkhanyan	Ararat Yerevan	2022–2023	4	0	1	0	5	0	0
50	(Tunisia) Ayman Mahmoud	Ararat Yerevan	2023–2024	5	0	0	0	5	0	0
50	(Armenia) Kamo Hovhannisyan	Ararat-Armenia	2024–Present	5	0	0	0	5	0	0
50	(Portugal) João Queirós	Ararat-Armenia	2024–2026	5	1	0	0	5	1	0.2
65	(Armenia) Gor Poghosyan	Ararat Yerevan	2017–2018	4	0	0	0	4	0	0
65	(Armenia) Andranik Kocharyan	Ararat Yerevan	2017–2018	4	0	0	0	4	0	0
65	(Armenia) David Davidyan	Ararat-Armenia; Ararat Yerevan	2018–2019; 2019–2020	1; 3	0; 0	0; 0	0; 0	4	0	0
65	(Bulgaria) Georgi Pashov	Ararat-Armenia	2018–2019	4	0	0	0	4	0	0
65	(Russia) Aleksey Pustozyorov	Ararat-Armenia	2018–2019	4	0	0	0	4	0	0
65	(Russia) Mikhail Petrushchenkov	Ararat Yerevan	2018–2019	4	0	0	0	4	0	0
65	(Armenia) Sargis Shahinyan	Ararat Yerevan; Ararat-Armenia	2019; 2020–2022	1; 3	0; 0	0; 0	0; 0	4	0	0
65	(Nigeria) Ogana Louis	Ararat-Armenia	2019–2021	4	0	0	0	4	0	0
65	(Portugal) Ângelo Meneses	Ararat-Armenia	2019–2021	4	0	0	0	4	0	0
65	(Spain) Christian Jimenez	Ararat Yerevan	2020–2021	2	0	2	0	4	0	0
65	(Armenia) Artak Yedigaryan	Ararat Yerevan	2020–2021	2	0	2	0	4	0	0
65	(Ivory Coast) Mory Kone	Ararat Yerevan	2020–2021	3	0	1	0	4	0	0
65	(Moldova) Dan Spătaru	Ararat-Armenia	2021	2	0	2	0	4	0	0
65	(Armenia) Aleksandr Karapetyan	Ararat-Armenia	2021	2	1	2	0	4	1	0.25
65	(Argentina) Iván Díaz	Ararat Yerevan	2021–2022	4	0	0	0	4	0	0
65	(Ivory Coast) Armand Dagrou	Ararat Yerevan	2021–2023	4	0	0	0	4	0	0
65	(Ivory Coast) Amara Traoré	Ararat Yerevan	2021–2023	3	0	1	0	4	0	0
65	(Brazil) Romércio	Ararat-Armenia	2022–2023, 2025	3	0	1	0	4	0	0
65	(Bosnia and Herzegovina) Aleksandar Glišić	Ararat Yerevan	2022–2023	3	0	1	0	4	0	0
65	(Nigeria) Ibeh Ransom	Ararat Yerevan	2023	4	1	0	0	4	1	0.25
65	(Tunisia) Rayane Mzoughi	Ararat Yerevan	2023–2024	4	0	0	0	4	0	0
65	(Ghana) Clinton Dombila	Ararat Yerevan	2023–2026	4	0	0	0	4	0	0
65	(Armenia) Gor Lulukyan	Ararat Yerevan	2024–2026	4	0	0	0	4	0	0
65	(Ivory Coast) Moussa Kante	Ararat Yerevan	2024–Present	4	0	0	0	4	0	0
89	(Armenia) Rafael Safaryan	Ararat Yerevan	2018–2019	3	0	0	0	3	0	0
89	(Armenia) Ruslan Avagyan	Ararat Yerevan	2018–2021	3	0	0	0	3	0	0
89	(Armenia) Vardan Arzoyan	Ararat Yerevan	2018–2019, 2022	3	0	0	0	3	0	0
89	(Russia) Vladimir Khozin	Ararat-Armenia	2018–2019	3	1	0	0	3	1	0.33
89	(North Macedonia) Aleksandar Damchevski	Ararat-Armenia	2018–2021	3	0	0	0	3	0	0
89	(Colombia) Giovanny Martínez	Ararat-Armenia	2018–2019	3	0	0	0	3	0	0
89	(Spain) Sergi González	Ararat-Armenia	2018–2019	3	0	0	0	3	0	0
89	(Armenia) Armen Hovhannisyan	Ararat-Armenia	2018–2020, 2020–2022	2	0	1	0	3	0	0
89	(Armenia) Petros Avetisyan	Ararat-Armenia	2019–2020, 2024	3	3	0	0	3	3	1
89	(Russia) Dmitri Ryzhov	Ararat Yerevan	2019–2020	3	0	0	0	3	0	0
89	(Brazil) Weslen Junior	Ararat Yerevan	2019–2020	3	0	0	0	3	0	0
89	(Brazil) James Santos	Ararat Yerevan	2019–2020	3	0	0	0	3	0	0
89	(Ukraine) Pavlo Stepanets	Ararat Yerevan	2020	3	0	0	0	3	0	0
89	(Morocco) Rochdi Achenteh	Ararat-Armenia	2019–2020	3	0	0	0	3	0	0
89	(Spain) David Bollo	Ararat-Armenia	2020–2021	2	0	1	0	3	0	0
89	(Ukraine) Yehor Klymenchuk	Ararat-Armenia	2021–2022	3	0	0	0	3	0	0
89	(Armenia) Zhirayr Margaryan	Ararat Yerevan	2020–2021	2	0	1	0	3	0	0
89	(Ukraine) Maksym Zaderaka	Ararat Yerevan	2021	2	1	1	0	3	1	0.33
89	(Italy) Valerio Vimercati	Ararat-Armenia	2021–2022	3	0	0	0	3	0	0
89	(Armenia) Robert Hakobyan	Ararat Yerevan	2021–2022	3	0	0	0	3	0	0
89	(Ivory Coast) Sosthène Tiehide	Ararat Yerevan	2021–2023	3	0	0	0	3	0	0
89	(Portugal) Hugo Firmino	Ararat-Armenia	2022–2023	2	0	1	0	3	0	0
89	(Russia) Artyom Potapov	Ararat Yerevan	2022	2	0	1	0	3	0	0
89	(Armenia) Gevorg Ghazaryan	Ararat-Armenia	2022–2023	3	0	0	0	3	0	0
89	(Armenia) Arsen Beglaryan	Ararat-Armenia	2023–2024	3	0	0	0	3	0	0
89	(Brazil) Leonardo da Silva	Ararat-Armenia	2023–2024	3	0	0	0	3	0	0
89	(Portugal) Adriano Castanheira	Ararat-Armenia	2023–2024	3	0	0	0	3	0	0
89	(Guinea) Mohamed Yattara	Ararat-Armenia	2023–2024	3	3	0	0	3	3	1
89	(Argentina) Alexis Rodríguez	Ararat-Armenia	2024–2025	3	1	0	0	3	1	0.33
89	(Cameroon) Marius Noubissi	Ararat-Armenia	2023–2024	3	6	0	0	3	6	2
89	(Cameroon) Bertrand Mani	Ararat Yerevan	2023–2024	3	0	0	0	3	0	0
89	(Brazil) Tiago Gomes	Ararat Yerevan	2024–2025	3	0	0	0	3	0	0
89	(Brazil) Marcelo	Ararat Yerevan	2024–2026	3	0	0	0	3	0	0
89	(Armenia) Aram Aslanyan	Ararat Yerevan	2024–Present	3	0	0	0	3	0	0
89	(Colombia) Juan Balanta	Ararat-Armenia	2025–Present	3	0	0	0	3	0	0
89	(Armenia) Arayik Eloyan	Ararat-Armenia	2025–Present	3	1	0	0	3	1	0.33
89	(Brazil) Welton	Ararat-Armenia	2025–2026	3	0	0	0	3	0	0
89	(Comoros) Adel Anzimati	Ararat Yerevan	2025–Present	3	0	0	0	3	0	0
89	(Ivory Coast) Mohamed Lamin Fofana	Ararat Yerevan	2025–Present	3	0	0	0	3	0	0
129	(Bulgaria) Ivaylo Dimitrov	Ararat-Armenia	2018–2019	2	1	0	0	2	1	0.5
129	(Brazil) Kayron	Ararat-Armenia	2018	2	0	0	0	2	0	0
129	(Russia) Vladislav Oslonovsky	Ararat-Armenia	2018	2	0	0	0	2	0	0
129	(Armenia) Garegin Kirakosyan	Ararat Yerevan	2018–2019	2	0	0	0	2	0	0
129	(Australia) Anthony Trajkoski	Ararat Yerevan	2018–2019	2	0	0	0	2	0	0
129	(Armenia) Narek Alaverdyan	Ararat-Armenia	2019–2026; 2026–Present	2; 0	0; 0	0; 0	0; 0	2	0	0
129	(Bosnia and Herzegovina) Dejan Vukomanović	Ararat Yerevan	2019	2	1	0	0	2	1	0.5
129	(Belgium) Kevin Ntika	Ararat Yerevan	2019	2	0	0	0	2	0	0
129	(Ukraine) Mykhaylo Kaluhin	Ararat Yerevan	2019	2	0	0	0	2	0	0
129	(Ukraine) Andriy Yakovlyev	Ararat Yerevan	2019	2	0	0	0	2	0	0
129	(Armenia) Artyom Simonyan	Ararat Yerevan	2019	2	2	0	0	2	2	1
129	(South Korea) Sim Woon-sub	Ararat Yerevan	2018–2019	2	0	0	0	2	0	0
129	(Russia) Konstantin Morozov	Ararat Yerevan	2019–2020	2	0	0	0	2	0	0
129	(Russia) Yevgeni Makeyev	Ararat Yerevan	2019–2020	2	0	0	0	2	0	0
129	(Russia) Aleksandr Kozlov	Ararat Yerevan	2019–2020	2	0	0	0	2	0	0
129	(Russia) Georgy Chelidze	Ararat Yerevan	2019–2020	2	0	0	0	2	0	0
129	(Nigeria) Lukman Haruna	Ararat Yerevan	2019–2020	2	0	0	0	2	0	0
129	(Ukraine) Denys Dedechko	Ararat Yerevan	2019–2020	2	1	0	0	2	1	0.5
129	(Russia) Ramazan Isayev	Ararat Yerevan	2020	2	0	0	0	2	0	0
129	(Guadeloupe) Thomas Phibel	Ararat Yerevan	2020	2	0	0	0	2	0	0
129	(Brazil) Vitinho	Ararat Yerevan	2019–2020	2	0	0	0	2	0	0
129	(Estonia) Ilja Antonov	Ararat-Armenia	2019–2020	2	0	0	0	2	0	0
129	(Peru) Jeisson Martínez	Ararat-Armenia	2020–2021	2	0	0	0	2	0	0
129	(Belgium) Thibaut Lesquoy	Ararat-Armenia	2022	2	0	0	0	2	0	0
129	(Serbia) Igor Stanojević	Ararat Yerevan	2020–2021, 2021–2022	2	0	0	0	2	0	0
129	(Armenia) Styopa Mkrtchyan	Ararat-Armenia	2020–2024	1	0	1	0	2	0	0
129	(Armenia) Arman Mkrtchyan	Ararat Yerevan	2022–2023	2	0	0	0	2	0	0
129	(Russia) Timur Pukhov	Ararat Yerevan	2022–2023	2	0	0	0	2	0	0
129	(Nigeria) Jesse Akila	Ararat-Armenia	2022–2023	2	0	0	0	2	0	0
129	(Colombia) Carlos Pérez	Ararat-Armenia	2023–2024	2	0	0	0	2	0	0
129	(Nigeria) Taofiq Jibril	Ararat-Armenia	2023	2	2	0	0	2	2	1
129	(Mali) Malick Berte	Ararat Yerevan	2023–Present	2	0	0	0	2	0	0
129	(Serbia) Dusan Mijic	Ararat Yerevan	2023	2	1	0	0	2	1	0.5
129	(Bulgaria) Georgi Babaliev	Ararat Yerevan	2023–2024	2	0	0	0	2	0	0
129	(Ivory Coast) Mohamed Kone	Ararat Yerevan	2023	2	0	0	0	2	0	0
129	(Russia) Nikolai Kipiani	Ararat-Armenia	2023–2024	2	0	0	0	2	0	0
129	(Montenegro) Nemanja Lemajic	Ararat Yerevan	2022–2024	2	0	0	0	2	0	0
129	(France) Clément Lhernault	Ararat Yerevan	2023–2024	2	0	0	0	2	0	0
129	(Ukraine) Danylo Kucher	Ararat-Armenia	2024–2025	2	0	0	0	2	0	0
129	(Belarus) Aleksandr Pavlovets	Ararat-Armenia	2024–2025	2	0	0	0	2	0	0
129	(Ghana) Eric Ocansey	Ararat-Armenia	2024–2025	2	0	0	0	2	0	0
129	(Senegal) Moussa Kante	Ararat Yerevan	2024–Present	2	1	0	0	2	1	0.5
129	(Ivory Coast) Hyllarion Goore	Ararat Yerevan	2024–2025	2	0	0	0	2	0	0
129	(Madagascar) Sandro Trémoulet	Ararat Yerevan	2024–2025	2	0	0	0	2	0	0
129	(Portugal) Hugo Oliveira	Ararat-Armenia	2025–Present	2	1	0	0	2	1	0.5
129	(Portugal) Rodrigo Ramos	Ararat-Armenia	2025–2026	2	0	0	0	2	0	0
129	(Brazil) João Lima	Ararat-Armenia	2025–2026	2	0	0	0	2	0	0
129	(Ivory Coast) Adama Meite	Ararat Yerevan	2025–Present	2	1	0	0	2	1	0.5
129	(Ivory Coast) Yaya Sogodogo	Ararat Yerevan	2025–2026	2	1	0	0	2	1	0.5
129	(Cameroon) Patrick Handzongo	Ararat Yerevan	2025–Present	2	0	0	0	2	0	0
129	(Portugal) Bruno Pinto	Ararat-Armenia	2025–2026	2	0	0	0	2	0	0
129	(Greece) Alexandros Malis	Ararat-Armenia	2025–Present	2	0	0	0	2	0	0
129	(Senegal) Guy Felix Lima	Ararat Yerevan	2025–Present	2	0	0	0	2	0	0
183	(Australia) Liam Rose	Ararat-Armenia	2018–2019	1	0	0	0	1	0	0
183	(Colombia) Charles Monsalvo	Ararat-Armenia	2018	1	0	0	0	1	0	0
183	(Ivory Coast) Jean-Jacques Bougouhi	Ararat-Armenia	2018–2019	1	2	0	0	1	2	2
183	(Russia) Magomed Abidinov	Ararat Yerevan	2018–2019	1	0	0	0	1	0	0
183	(Russia) Dmitri Malyaka	Ararat Yerevan	2018	1	0	0	0	1	0	0
183	(Armenia) Orbeli Hambardzumyan	Ararat Yerevan	2018	1	0	0	0	1	0	0
183	(Armenia) David Zakharyan	Ararat Yerevan	2018	1	0	0	0	1	0	0
183	(Russia) Alan Tatayev	Ararat Yerevan	2018	1	0	0	0	1	0	0
183	(Armenia) Sergey Mkrtchyan	Ararat Yerevan	2018	1	0	0	0	1	0	0
183	(Germany) David Azin	Ararat Yerevan	2018–2019	1	0	0	0	1	0	0
183	(Senegal) Pape Demba Dieye	Ararat Yerevan	2018	1	0	0	0	1	0	0
183	(Armenia) Sargis Metoyan	Ararat Yerevan	2018–2019	1	0	0	0	1	0	0
183	(Russia) Dmitri Ostrovski	Ararat Yerevan	2018	1	0	0	0	1	0	0
183	(Russia) Matvey Guyganov	Ararat Yerevan	2018–2019	1	0	0	0	1	0	0
183	(France) Aboubacar Gassama	Ararat Yerevan	2018–2019	1	0	0	0	1	0	0
183	(Belarus) Andrey Chukhley	Ararat Yerevan	2018–2019	1	0	0	0	1	0	0
183	(Armenia) Vahe Chopuryan	Ararat Yerevan	2018–2019	1	0	0	0	1	0	0
183	(Armenia) Hayk Sargsyan	Ararat Yerevan	2018–2019	1	0	0	0	1	0	0
183	(Armenia) Artak Aleksanyan	Ararat Yerevan	2019–2020	1	0	0	0	1	0	0
183	(Russia) Arkadi Kalaydzhyan	Ararat Yerevan	2019–2020	1	0	0	0	1	0	0
183	(Georgia (country)) Zurab Arziani	Ararat Yerevan	2019–2020	1	0	0	0	1	0	0
183	(Russia) Irakli Logua	Ararat Yerevan	2019–2020	1	0	0	0	1	0	0
183	(Russia) Taymuraz Toboyev	Ararat Yerevan	2019–2020	1	0	0	0	1	0	0
183	(Portugal) Sancidino Silva	Ararat Yerevan	2019–2020	1	0	0	0	1	0	0
183	(Brazil) Rafinha	Ararat Yerevan	2020	1	0	0	0	1	0	0
183	(Armenia) Karen Shirkhanyan	Ararat Yerevan	2019–2020	1	0	0	0	1	0	0
183	(Nigeria) Ganiyu Oseni	Ararat Yerevan	2020	1	0	0	0	1	0	0
183	(Serbia) Stefan Čupić	Ararat-Armenia	2019–2021	1	0	0	0	1	0	0
183	(Democratic Republic of the Congo) Heradi Rashidi	Ararat-Armenia	2021	1	0	0	0	1	0	0
183	(Serbia) Nikola Petrić	Ararat-Armenia	2021	1	0	0	0	1	0	0
183	(Uruguay) Diego Barboza	Ararat-Armenia	2021–2022	1	0	0	0	1	0	0
183	(Ivory Coast) Yacouba Silue	Ararat Yerevan	2021–2022	1	0	0	0	1	0	0
183	(Armenia) Hovhannes Nazaryan	Ararat Yerevan	2021–2023	1	0	0	0	1	0	0
183	(Armenia) Yuri Magakyan	Ararat Yerevan	2020–2023	1	0	0	0	1	0	0
183	(Armenia) Arman Hovhannisyan	Ararat-Armenia; Ararat Yerevan	2018–2019, 2022–2023; 2023, 2025	1; 0	0; 0	0; 0	0; 0	1	0	0
183	(Serbia) Miloš Stamenković	Ararat Yerevan; Ararat-Armenia	2013–2014; 2022–2023	0; 1	0; 0	0; 0	0; 0	1	0	0
183	(Nigeria) Hilary Gong	Ararat-Armenia	2023	1	0	0	0	1	0	0
183	(Croatia) Dragan Lovrić	Ararat-Armenia	2023	1	0	0	0	1	0	0
183	(Brazil) Agdon Menezes	Ararat-Armenia	2022–2024	0	0	1	1	1	1	1
183	(The Gambia) Babu Cham	Ararat Yerevan	2022	1	0	0	0	1	0	0
183	(France) Teddy Mézague	Ararat Yerevan	2023	1	0	0	0	1	0	0
183	(Armenia) Petros Afajanyan	Ararat Yerevan	2023	1	0	0	0	1	0	0
183	(Armenia) Michel Ayvazyan	Ararat-Armenia	2022–Present	1	0	0	0	1	0	0
183	(Brazil) Cássio Scheid	Ararat-Armenia	2023–2024	1	0	0	0	1	0	0
183	(Armenia) Erik Azizyan	Ararat Yerevan	2023	1	0	0	0	1	0	0
183	(Armenia) Arman Harutyunyan	Ararat Yerevan	2023	1	0	0	0	1	0	0
183	(Armenia) Hamlet Minasyan	Ararat Yerevan	2023–2024	1	0	0	0	1	0	0
183	(Cameroon) Ramses Donfack	Ararat Yerevan	2024	1	0	0	0	1	0	0
183	(Armenia) Henri Avagyan	Ararat-Armenia	2025	1	0	0	0	1	0	0
183	(Armenia) Aleksandr Aleksanyan	Ararat Yerevan	2023–Present	1	0	0	0	1	0	0
183	(Armenia) Andranik Martirosyan	Ararat Yerevan	2024–Present	1	0	0	0	1	0	0
183	(Guinea) Alseny Toure	Ararat Yerevan	2025–2026	1	0	0	0	1	0	0
183	(France) Marvin Evouna	Ararat Yerevan	2025	1	0	0	0	1	0	0
183	(Switzerland) Marc Tsoungui	Ararat Yerevan	2025	1	0	0	0	1	0	0
183	(Armenia) Gagik Simonyan	Ararat Yerevan	2023–Present	1	0	0	0	1	0	0
183	(Nigeria) James Johna	Ararat Yerevan	2025	1	0	0	0	1	0	0
183	(Ivory Coast) Keasse Bah	Ararat Yerevan	2025	1	0	0	0	1	0	0
183	(Armenia) Alen Vardanyan	Ararat Yerevan	2023–Present	1	0	0	0	1	0	0
183	(Nigeria) Christopher Boniface	Ararat Yerevan	2024–2025	1	0	0	0	1	0	0
183	(Armenia) Arman Nersesyan	Ararat-Armenia	2019–Present	1	0	0	0	1	0	0
183	(Armenia) Vahram Makhsudyan	Ararat-Armenia	2024–Present	1	0	0	0	1	0	0
183	(Belgium) Zakaria Makhnoun	Ararat Yerevan	2025–2026	1	0	0	0	1	0	0
183	(Mali) Abdoul Karim Djire	Ararat Yerevan	2025–2026	1	0	0	0	1	0	0
183	(Armenia) Artur Kartashyan	Ararat Yerevan	2025–2026	1	0	0	0	1	0	0
183	(Guinea-Bissau) Zidane Banjaqui	Ararat-Armenia	2026–Present	1	0	0	0	1	0	0
183	(Ghana) Paul Ayongo	Ararat-Armenia	2026–Present	1	0	0	0	1	0	0
183	(Senegal) Alioune Ndour	Ararat-Armenia	2026–Present	1	0	0	0	1	0	0
183	(Mali) Souleymane Touré	Ararat Yerevan	2026–Present	1	0	0	0	1	0	0
183	(Ivory Coast) Aboubacar Ouattara	Ararat Yerevan	2025–Present	1	0	0	0	1	0	0
183	(Armenia) Tigran Hakobyan	Ararat Yerevan	2025–Present	1	0	0	0	1	0	0
183	(Nigeria) Okuchukwu Chukwu	Ararat Yerevan	2025–Present	1	0	0	0	1	0	0
183	(Armenia) Alen Mkrtchyan	Ararat Yerevan	2025–Present	1	0	0	0	1	0	0
183	(Nigeria) Emmanuel Obinna	Ararat Yerevan	2025–2026	1	0	0	0	1	0	0

=== Hat-tricks ===
Two players have scored a hat-trick in a competitive match between Ararat-Armenia and Ararat Yerevan, with one player doing so on two separate occasions.

Player	For	Score	Date	Competition	Stadium	Ref.
(Cameroon) Marius Noubissi	Ararat-Armenia	3–2 (H)	18 October 2024	2024–25 Premier League	FFA Stadium	
(Cameroon) Marius Noubissi	Ararat-Armenia	6–0 (H)	28 May 2025	2024–25 Premier League	FFA Stadium	
(Armenia) Artur Serobyan	Ararat-Armenia	4–0 (H)	25 April 2026	2025–26 Premier League	Vahagn Tumasyan Stadium	

Note: (H) – Home; (A) – Away

=== Clean sheets ===
	Name	Club	Years	League apps	League clean sheets	Cup apps	Cup clean sheets	Total apps	Total clean sheets	Ratio
1	(Russia) Dmitry Abakumov	Ararat-Armenia	2018–2023	10	5	2	0	12	5	0.42
1	(Russia) Vsevolod Ermakov	Ararat Yerevan; Ararat-Armenia	2020–2022; 2022–2024	7; 5	2; 1	2; 1	1; 1	15	5	0.33
3	(Italy) Valerio Vimercati	Ararat-Armenia	2021–2022	3	2	0	0	3	2	0.67
4	(Serbia) Stefan Čupić	Ararat-Armenia	2019–2021	1	1	0	0	1	1	1
4	(Armenia) Arsen Beglaryan	Ararat-Armenia	2023–2024	3	1	0	0	3	1	0.33
4	(Brazil) Tiago Gomes	Ararat Yerevan	2024–2025	3	1	0	0	3	1	0.33
4	(Ukraine) Danylo Kucher	Ararat-Armenia	2023–2024	2	1	0	0	2	1	0.5
4	(Armenia) Henri Avagyan	Ararat-Armenia	2025	1	1	0	0	1	1	1
4	(Portugal) Bruno Pinto	Ararat-Armenia	2025–2026	2	1	0	0	2	1	0.5
10	(Russia) Artyom Potapov	Ararat Yerevan	2022	2	0	1	0	3	0	0
10	(Russia) Mikhail Petrushchenkov	Ararat Yerevan	2018–2019	4	0	0	0	4	0	0
10	(Russia) Sergei Revyakin	Ararat Yerevan	2019–2020, 2023	6	0	0	0	6	0	0
10	(Serbia) Nikola Petrić	Ararat-Armenia	2021	1	0	0	0	1	0	0
10	(Montenegro) Nemanja Lemajic	Ararat Yerevan	2022–2024	2	0	0	0	2	0	0
10	(Armenia) Arman Harutyunyan	Ararat Yerevan	2023	1	0	0	0	1	0	0
10	(Armenia) Andranik Martirosyan	Ararat Yerevan	2024–Present	1	0	0	0	1	0	0
10	(Comoros) Adel Anzimati	Ararat Yerevan	2025–Present	3	0	0	0	3	0	0
10	(Armenia) Arman Nersesyan	Ararat-Armenia	2019–Present	1	0	0	0	1	0	0

=== Red cards ===
Three players have been sent off in a competitive match between Ararat-Armenia and Ararat Yerevan.

Player	For	Score	Date	Competition	Stadium	Ref.
(Brazil) Romércio	Ararat-Armenia	3–1 (H)	15 April 2022	2021–22 Premier League	FFA Stadium	
(Nigeria) Isah Aliyu	Ararat Yerevan	3–1 (A)	15 April 2022	2021–22 Premier League	FFA Stadium	
(Madagascar) Sandro Trémoulet	Ararat Yerevan	0–0 (H)	10 November 2024	2024–25 Premier League	FFA Stadium	

Note: (H) – Home; (A) – Away
