= List of association football club rivalries in Europe =

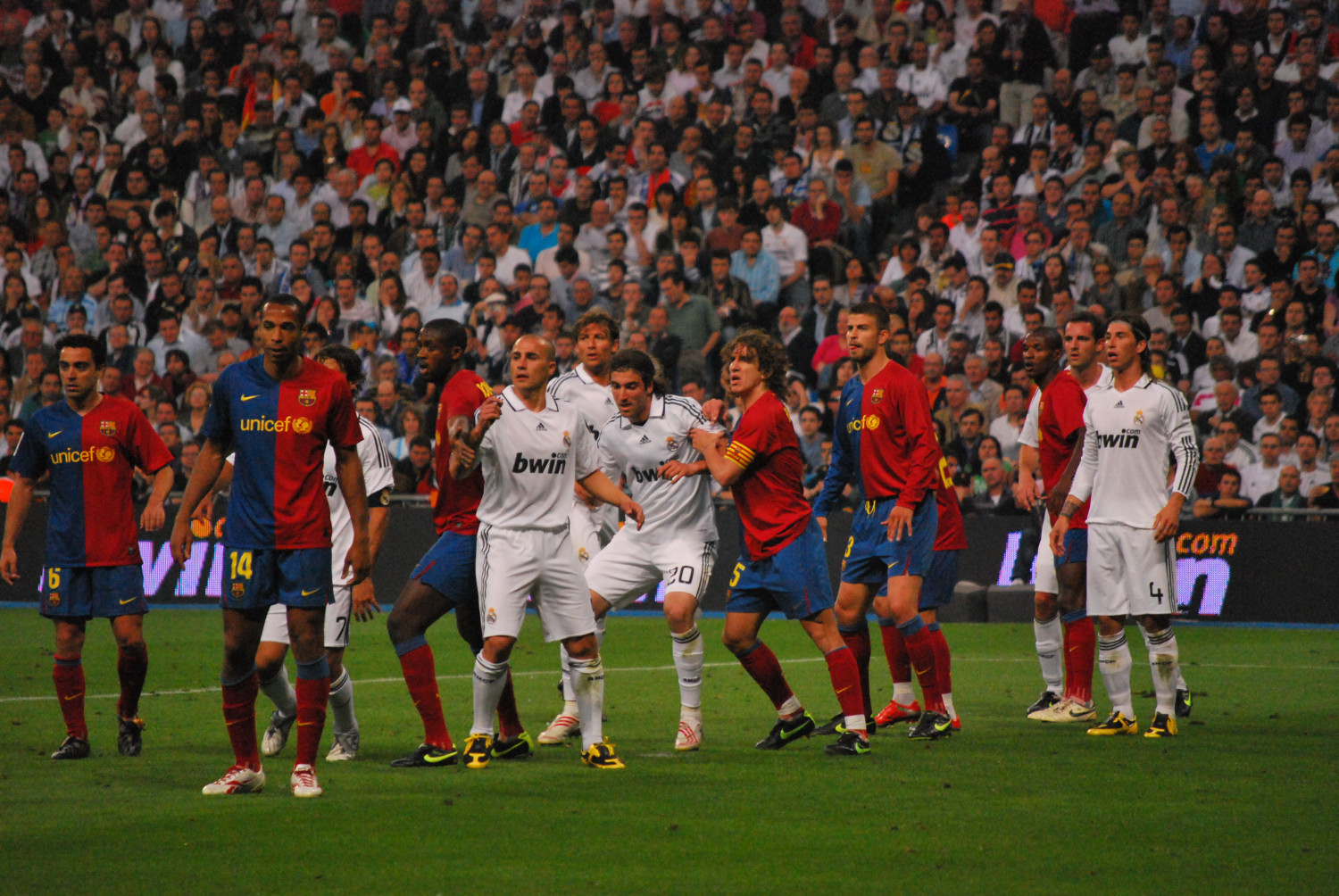
A match between rivals Real Madrid and Barcelona.

This list deals with association football rivalries around the Europe among clubs. This includes local derbies as well as matches between teams further afield. For rivalries between international teams and club rivalries around the world, see List of association football rivalries.

Only clubs of federations which are members of UEFA are included. (Note: Spartak Moscow are currently suspended due to the Russian invasion of Ukraine)

== International ==
Team 1	Team 2	Article	Source
(Czech Republic) Sparta Prague	(Slovakia) Slovan Bratislava		
(Croatia) Dinamo Zagreb	(Serbia) Partizan		
(Croatia) Dinamo Zagreb	(Serbia) Red Star Belgrade		
(Croatia) Hajduk Split	(Serbia) Partizan		
(Croatia) Hajduk Split	(Serbia) Red Star Belgrade		
(Denmark) Copenhagen	(Sweden) Malmö FF		
(Spain) Barcelona	(Germany) Bayern Munich		
(Spain) Barcelona	(England) Arsenal	2006 UEFA Champions league final	
(Spain) Barcelona	(Italy) Inter Milan		
(Spain) Barcelona	(England) Chelsea		
(England) Leeds United	(Turkey) Galatasaray	2000 UEFA Cup semi-final violence	
(England) Manchester City	(Spain) Real Madrid		
(England) Manchester City	(Germany) Bayern Munich		
(England) Manchester United	(Italy) Juventus		
(England) Manchester United	(Italy) AC Milan		
(England) Manchester United	(Spain) Barcelona	1991 European Cup Winners' Cup final, 2009 UEFA Champions League final, 2011 UEFA Champions League final	
(France) Paris Saint-Germain	(Spain) Barcelona	1997 UEFA Cup Winners' Cup final	
(France) Paris Saint-Germain	(Spain) Real Madrid		
(Germany) Bayern Munich	(Spain) Real Madrid	Bayern Munich–Real Madrid rivalry	
(Italy) Juventus	(Spain) Real Madrid	Real Madrid–Juventus rivalry	
(England) Liverpool	(Spain) Real Madrid	1981 European Cup final, 2018 UEFA Champions League final, 2022 UEFA Champions League final	
(England) Liverpool	(Italy) Juventus	1984 European Super Cup, Heysel Stadium disaster, 1985 European Cup final	
(England) Liverpool	(Italy) AC Milan	2005 UEFA Champions League final, 2007 UEFA Champions League final	
(England) Liverpool	(Italy) AS Roma	1984 European Cup final	
(Germany) Hamburger SV	(Scotland) Celtic		
(Hungary) Ferencváros	(Slovakia) Slovan Bratislava		
(Northern Ireland) Linfield	(Republic of Ireland) Shamrock Rovers		
(Poland) Śląsk Wrocław	(Spain) Sevilla		

=== Friendly rivalry ===
Team 1	Team 2	Article	Source
(Spain) Barcelona	(Italy) AC Milan	Barcelona–AC Milan rivalry	
(Germany) Borussia Dortmund	(Spain) Real Madrid	2024 UEFA Champions League final	
(Italy) AC Milan	(Spain) Real Madrid		
(Italy) Inter Milan	(Spain) Real Madrid		
(England) Manchester United	(Germany) Bayern Munich	1999 UEFA Champions League final	

=== Suspended members ===
Team 1	Team 2	Article	Source
(Russia) Spartak Moscow (Note: Due to the Russian invasion of Ukraine.)	(Ukraine) Dynamo Kyiv	Spartak Moscow–Dynamo Kyiv rivalry	

== Albania ==
- Oldest Albanian derby: KF Tirana vs. Vllaznia Shkoder
- Tirana derbies:
  - Tirana derby I: Partizani Tirana vs. KF Tirana
  - Tirana derby II: Partizani Tirana vs. Dinamo Tirana
  - Tirana Derby III: KF Tirana vs. Dinamo Tirana
- Myzeqe Derby: Apolonia Fier vs. KF Lushnja
- Korçë–Tirana rivalries: FK Partizani Tirana or KF Tirana or KS Dinamo Tirana vs. KF Skënderbeu Korçë
- Vlorë–Korça rivalry : KS Flamurtari Vlorë vs. KF Skënderbeu Korçë
- Elbasani–Tirana rivalry : KF Elbasani vs. KF Tirana or Dinamo Tirana or Partizani Tirana
- Tirana–Durrës rivalry : Partizani Tirana or KF Tirana or Dinamo Tirana vs. KF Teuta
- North Albanian derby: Vllaznia vs. KF Laçi or KF Kukësi or Besëlidhja Lezhë
- North-East Albanian derby : KF Kukësi vs. Korabi Peshkopi or KF Tërbuni
- Fieri derby : Apolonia Fier vs. KF Çlirimi
- Coastal derby : KS Flamurtari Vlorë vs. KF Teuta

== Andorra ==
- El Clàssic: FC Santa Coloma vs. UE Sant Julià
- Santa Coloma Derby: FC Santa Coloma vs. UE Santa Coloma
- Escaldes derby:Inter Escaldes vs Atletic Escaldes

== Armenia ==
- The Central derby of Yerevan: Ararat-Armenia vs. Pyunik Yerevan
- Oldest Yerevan derby: Urartu vs. Pyunik Yerevan
- The Ararat's derby: Ararat vs. Ararat-Armenia
- The black and whites derby: Ararat-Armenia vs. Noah
- Kapan derby: FC Gandzasar Kapan vs. FC Syunik

== Austria ==
- Vienna derby: SK Rapid vs. Austria Wien
- „Das Traditionsduell“: Sturm Graz vs. SK Rapid
- Graz Derby: Grazer AK vs. Sturm Graz
- Upper Austrian Derby : LASK Linz vs. SV Ried
- Linz Derby: FC Blau-Weiß Linz vs. LASK Linz
- Western derby: Wacker Innsbruck vs. Austria Salzburg
- Derby of Love: First Vienna F.C. vs. Wiener Sportklub
- Lustenau Derby: Austria Lustenau vs. FC Lustenau 07
- Vorarlberg Derbys: Austria Lustenau vs. SCR Altach
- Niederösterreich Derby: SKN St. Pölten vs. Admira Wacker
- Carinthian derby : Wolfsberger AC vs. SV Austria Klagenfurt

== Azerbaijan ==
- The Great Game: Neftchi Baku vs. Khazar Lankaran
- Azerbaijani Derby: Neftchi Baku vs. Qarabagh
- Historical derby: Neftchi Baku vs. Kapaz Ganja
- Western derby: Kapaz Ganja vs. Turan Tovuz

== Belarus ==
- The Capital derby:
  - Dinamo Minsk vs. FC Minsk
- Minsk derbies:
  - Dinamo Minsk vs. Partizan Minsk
  - Dinamo Minsk vs Torpedo Minsk
  - Partizan Minsk vs Torpedo Minsk
- Belarusian classico: Dinamo Minsk vs. BATE Borisov
- Brest derby: Dinamo Brest vs. Rukh
- Dinamo derby: Dinamo Brest vs. Dinamo Minsk

== Bosnia and Herzegovina ==
- Sarajevo derby: FK Sarajevo vs. Željezničar Sarajevo
- Small derby of Sarajevo: FK Sarajevo or Željezničar Sarajevo vs. Olimpik Sarajevo vs. Slavija Sarajevo
- Bosnian derby : Čelik Zenica vs. FK Sarajevo
- Mostar derby: Zrinjski Mostar vs. Velež Mostar
- Herzegovina derby: Zrinjski Mostar vs. NK Široki Brijeg
- Tuzla derby: Sloboda Tuzla vs. Tuzla City
- North Tuzla Canton derby : Zvijezda Gradačac vs. Gradina Srebrenik
- Travnik derby: NK Travnik vs. NK Novi Travnik
- Kakanj derby: Mladost Doboj Kakanj vs. Rudar Kakanj
- Derby of Central Bosnia Canton: NK Novi Travnik vs. NK Busovača
- Krajina derby:
  - Rudar Prijedor vs. Borac Banja Luka
  - Krajina Cazin vs. Krajišnik Velika Kladuša
- Susjedski derby: NK Široki Brijeg vs. HŠK Posušje
- Inter-city rivalry: FK Sarajevo vs. Borac Banja Luka or Željezničar Sarajevo vs. Borac Banja Luka

== Bulgaria ==
- Sofia derbies:
  - The Eternal Derby: Levski Sofia vs. CSKA Sofia
  - Little capital derby: Slavia Sofia vs. Lokomotiv Sofia
  - Oldest capital derby: Levski Sofia vs. Slavia Sofia
  - Sofia derby: Levski Sofia, Lokomotiv Sofia, CSKA Sofia, Slavia Sofia, FC CSKA 1948 Sofia and Septemvri Sofia
- Plovdiv derbies:
  - The Plovdiv derby: Botev Plovdiv vs. Lokomotiv Plovdiv
  - Little Plovdiv derby: Spartak Plovdiv vs. Maritsa Plovdiv
  - Plovdiv derby: Botev Plovdiv, Lokomotiv Plovdiv, Spartak Plovdiv and Maritsa Plovdiv
- Varna derby: Spartak Varna vs. Cherno More Varna
- The New Bulgarian derbies: CSKA Sofia or Levski Sofia vs. Ludogorets Razgrad
- Thracian derby: Botev Plovdiv vs. Beroe Stara Zagora
- Burgas derby: Chernomorets Burgas vs. Neftochimic Burgas
- North derby: Etar Veliko Tarnovo vs. Lokomotiv Gorna Oryahovitsa
- North-West Derby: PFC Montana vs. Botev Vratza
- Railroaders derby: Lokomotiv Plovdiv vs. Lokomotiv Sofia vs. Lokomotiv Gorna Oryahovitsa vs. Lokomotiv Mezdra vs. Lokomotiv Ruse
- Kyustendil Province derby: Velbazhd Kyustendil vs. Marek Dupnitsa
- Southwest derby: Pirin Blagoevgrad vs. Vihren Sandanski vs. Belasitsa Petrich
- Sofia Province derby: Slivnishki Geroy vs. OFC Kostinbrod
- Northeast derby: Dunav Ruse vs. Dobrudzha Dobrich
- Plovdiv vs. Sofia Rivalry: Botev Plovdiv or Lokomotiv Plovdiv vs. Levski Sofia or CSKA Sofia. Especially Botev Plovdiv vs. Levski Sofia and Lokomotiv Plovdiv vs. CSKA Sofia
- Pernik vs. Sofia Rivalry: Minyor Pernik vs. Levski Sofia, CSKA Sofia, Slavia Sofia and Lokomotiv Sofia. Especially Minyor Pernik vs. Levski Sofia
- Lovech vs. Sofia Rivalry: Litex Lovech vs. Levski Sofia, Lokomotiv Sofia, CSKA Sofia and Slavia Sofia. Especially Litex Lovech vs Levski Sofia
- Razgrad vs. Varna Rivalry: Ludogorets Razgrad vs. Cherno More Varna
- Ruse derby: Dunav Ruse vs. Lokomotiv Ruse
- Pernik derby: Minyor Pernik vs. Metalurg Pernik
- Kardzhali Province derby: Arda Kardzhali vs. FC Krumovgrad
- Pleven derby: Spartak Pleven vs. Belite orli
- Rila–Pirin derby: Marek Dupnitsa vs. Pirin Blagoevgrad

== Croatia ==
- Eternal derby: Hajduk Split vs. Dinamo Zagreb
- Adriatic derby: Hajduk Split vs. Rijeka
- Dalmatian derby: Šibenik vs. Hajduk Split
- Dinamo–Rijeka derby: Dinamo Zagreb vs. Rijeka
- Osijek–Rijeka derby : Osijek vs. Rijeka
- Slavonian derby: Osijek vs. Cibalia or Vukovar 1991
- Zagreb derby: Dinamo Zagreb vs. Lokomotiva vs. Zagreb
- Split Derby: Split vs. Hajduk Split
- Derby della Učka : Rijeka vs. Istra 1961
- Rijeka derby : Rijeka vs. Orijent 1919
- Northern Croatia derby: Slaven Belupo vs. Varaždin

== Cyprus ==
- Eternal derby: APOEL vs. Omonia
- Nicosia derbies: APOEL vs. Olympiakos Nicosia, Omonia vs. Olympiakos Nicosia
- The Oldest Cypriot Derby: APOEL vs. Anorthosis
- Limassol derby: Apollon vs. AEL vs. Aris
- Famagusta derby: Anorthosis vs. Nea Salamina

== Czech Republic ==
- Prague derbies:
  - Prague derby: Sparta Prague vs. Slavia Prague
  - Little Prague derby: Sparta Prague or Slavia Prague or Bohemians 1905 vs. FK Dukla Prague vs. Viktoria Žižkov
  - Vršovice derby: Slavia Prague vs. Bohemians 1905
- Inter-regional derbies:
  - Sparta Prague vs. Baník Ostrava
  - Slavia Prague vs. Viktoria Plzeň
- East Bohemian derby: FC Hradec Králové vs. FK Pardubice
- North Bohemian derbies:
  - Podještědské derby: FK Jablonec vs. FC Slovan Liberec
  - Ustec derby: FK Teplice vs. Baník Most vs. FK Ústí nad Labem
- Moravian derby: FC Zbrojovka Brno vs. SK Sigma Olomouc vs. 1. FC Slovácko vs. FC Zlín vs. FC Vysočina Jihlava
- Silesian derby:
  - SFC Opava vs. FC Baník Ostrava
  - Any match between teams Karviná, Frýdek-Místek FC Baník Ostrava, SFC Opava and FC Hlučín

== Denmark ==
- Copenhagen region derbies:
  - Copenhagen Derby: Brøndby IF vs. F.C. Copenhagen
  - North-west Copenhagen derby: Brønshøj Boldklub vs. Vanløse IF
  - Northern Copenhagen derby: Lyngby BK vs. Akademisk Boldklub
  - Battle of the Marshland : Akademisk Boldklub vs. Brønshøj Boldklub
  - Battle of Northern Zealand : FC Nordsjælland vs. Lyngby BK
- Historic Rivals: Brøndby IF vs. AGF
- Jutland derbies:
  - Battle of Jutland: Aalborg BK vs. Aarhus GF
  - Battle of East Jutland : Randers FC vs. Aarhus GF
  - Battle of Southern Jutland : Esbjerg fB vs. SønderjyskE
  - Battle of Northern Jutland : Hobro IK vs. Aalborg BK vs. Vendsyssel FF
  - Battle of South-Eastern Jutland : AC Horsens vs. Vejle BK
  - Battle of Central Jutland : Viborg FF vs. FC Midtjylland vs. Silkeborg IF
  - Battle of Hatred: Viborg FF vs. FC Midtjylland
  - Herning vs Ikast derby : Herning Fremad vs. Ikast FS
  - Aarhus derby : Aarhus Fremad vs. AGF
- Battle of Funen : Odense BK vs. B1909

== Estonia ==
- Tallinn derby: Flora Tallinn vs. Levadia Tallinn
- Raudteederbi (lit. 'Railway derby'): Flora Tallinn vs. Nõmme Kalju
- Nõmme derby: Nõmme Kalju vs. Nõmme United
- Ida-Virumaa derby: Narva Trans vs. Sillamäe Kalev

== Faroe Islands ==
- Tórshavn derby: B36 Tórshavn vs. HB Tórshavn
- Tórshavn–Klaksvík rivalry: B36 Tórshavn vs KÍ Klaksvík

== Finland ==
=== Inter-city rivalries ===
- Klassikko Helsinki–Countryside rivalry: HJK vs. Valkeakosken Haka
- Moderni klassikko 'The Modern Classic' rivalry between: HJK and FC Lahti
- Pirkanmaan derby: Valkeakosken Haka vs. Ilves or Tampere United
- Pohjanmaan derby: SJK vs. VPS vs. FF Jaro vs. KPV
- Savon derby: MP vs. KuPS
- Rauma–Pori rivalry: FC Rauma or Pallo-Iirot vs. FC Jazz
- Tampere–Helsinki rivalry: Ilves or Tampere United vs. HJK Helsinki or HIFK Helsinki
- Turku–Helsinki rivalry: Turun Palloseura or Inter Turku vs. HJK Helsinki or HIFK Helsinki
- Turku–Tampere rivalry: Ilves or Tampere United vs. Turun Palloseura or Inter Turku
- Seinäjoki–Vaasa rivalry: SJK vs. VPS
- Lapin derby / Jänkäderby: RoPS vs. PS Kemi
- Raseborgs derby: Ekenäs IF vs. BK-46
- Kakkosen A-lohkon derby: MP vs. IF Gnistan

=== City derbies ===
- Kokkolan derby: KPV vs. GBK
- Porin derby: FC Jazz vs. MuSa
- Pääkaupunkiseudun derby / Metroderby: HJK Helsinki or HIFK Helsinki vs. FC Honka
- Töölö-Oulunkylä derby HJK vs IF Gnistan
- Rauma derby: FC Rauma vs. Pallo-Iirot
- Stadin derby: HJK Helsinki vs. HIFK Helsinki
- Tampereen derby: Ilves vs. Tampereen Pallo-Veikot vs. Tampere United
- Turun derby: Turun Palloseura vs. Inter Turku
- Mikkelin derby: MP vs. MiPK
- Oulun derby: AC Oulu vs. OPS
- Vaasan derby: VPS vs. VIFK

== Georgia ==
- Georgian Big derby: Dinamo Tbilisi vs. Torpedo Kutaisi
- The Main Tbilisi derby: Dinamo Tbilisi vs. Locomotive Tbilisi
- Tbilisi derby: Dinamo Tbilisi vs. WIT Georgia vs. Locomotive Tbilisi vs. Saburtalo
- Dinamo derby or Georgian–Adjarian rivalry: Dinamo Tbilisi vs Dinamo Batumi
- Dinamo Batumi vs. Guria rivalry

== Gibraltar ==
- Europa FC vs. Lincoln Red Imps
- Ocean Village derby: Boca Gibraltar vs Bruno's Magpies

== Hungary ==
- Budapest city derbies:
  - A Derbi: Ferencváros TC vs. Újpest FC
  - Örökrangadó: Ferencvárosi TC vs. MTK Budapest FC
  - Any match between Ferencváros TC, Újpest FC, MTK Budapest FC, Vasas SC and Budapest Honvéd FC
- Győr derby: Gyirmót FC Győr vs. Győri ETO FC
- East derby: Diósgyőri VTK vs. Nyíregyháza Spartacus FC
- Transdanubia derby: Videoton FC vs. Győri ETO FC
- West derby: Szombathelyi Haladás vs. Zalaegerszegi TE
- Budapest–Debrecen derby: Ferencváros TC, Újpest FC, Budapest Honvéd FC vs. Debreceni VSC
- West-East derby: Videoton FC vs. Debreceni VSC
- Baranya derby: Pécsi MFC vs. Komlói Bányász SK

== Iceland ==
- Akureyri derby: KA vs. Þór
- Austurland derby: KFA vs. Höttur/Huginn
- Breiðholt derby: ÍR vs. Leiknir Reykjavík
- Hafnarfjörður derby: FH vs. Haukar
- Kópavogur derby: Breiðablik vs. HK
- Norðurland vestra derby: Tindastóll vs. Kormákur/Hvöt
- Reykjanesbær derby: Keflavík vs. Njarðvík
- Reykjavík Derby: KR vs. Valur vs. Fram vs. Víkingur Reykjavík vs. Fjölnir
- Stjarnan vs. Breiðablik
- Suðurland derby: Selfoss vs. ÍBV vs. Ægir
- Suðurnesjabær derby: Víðir vs. Reynir Sandgerði
- Tröllaskagi derby: Dalvík/Reynir vs. KF
- Vesturland derby: ÍA vs. Víkingur Ólafsvík vs. Skallagrímur

== Kazakhstan ==
- River derby: Irtysh Pavlodar vs. Akzhayik Uralsk vs. Tobol Kostanay
- Two capitals derby: Kairat Almaty vs. Astana
- West derby: FC Atyrau vs. FC Aktobe
- El Classico: FC Ordabasy vs. FC Aktobe
- Caspian derby: FC Caspiy vs. FC Atyrau
- Astana derby: FC Astana vs. Jenis
- Almaty derby: FC Kairat vs. CSKA Almaty

== Kosovo ==
- Gjilan derby: KF Drita vs. SC Gjilani
- Gjilan–Pristina derbies:
  - KF Drita vs. KF Prishtina
  - SC Gjilani vs. KF Prishtina
- Dukagjin derby: Vëllaznimi vs. Liria Prizren
- Drenica Valley derby: KF Feronikeli vs. KF Drenica
- Mitrovica derby: Trepça vs. Trepça '89
- Old derby: Trepça vs. Prishtina
- Pejë derby: KF Besa Pejë vs. KF Shqiponja
- Pristina derby: Prishtina e Re or Flamurtari vs. Prishtina

== Latvia ==
- Kurzeme derby: FK Ventspils vs. FK Liepāja/MOGO
- Riga derby: Riga FC vs. RFS

== Lithuania ==
- The fans derbies of Lithuania: DFK Dainava vs. FK Žalgiris vs FK Kauno Žalgiris
- The Old derby:: FBK Kaunas vs. FK Ekranas vs. Žalgiris
- Vilnius stadium derbies:
  - Old: Žalgiris vs. Polonija; Žalgiris vs REO Vilnius
  - New: Žalgiris vs. FK Riteriai
- Panevėžys derby: FK Panevėžys vs. Ekranas
- The academies derby: FK Be1 vs Baltijos Futbolo Akademija
- The logistics derby: Hegelmann FC vs FK TransINVEST

Additionally, the Klaipėda/Seaside derby name is often attached for any match involving two teams from Klaipėda County, Samogitian derby – teams of the region or West Lithuania in general, Kaunas derby – from the Kaunas urban area or even the county, etc.

== Luxembourg ==
- Derby d'Esch : Fola Esch vs. Jeunesse Esch
- Derby d' The Big Three : F91 Dudelange vs. FC Differdange 03 vs. Jeunesse Esch
- Derby d' Futból : Progrès Niedercorn vs. U.N. Käerjeng '97
- Derby d' Strassen : FC UNA Strassen vs. Racing Union
- Derby d' Jeunesse : Jeunesse Canach vs. Jeunesse Esch

== Malta ==
- Old Firm Derby: Floriana vs. Sliema Wanderers
- Derby Of The Capital: Valletta vs. Floriana
- Derby of the North: Mosta vs. Naxxar Lions
- Birkirkara vs. Valletta
- Sliema Wanderers vs. Gżira United
- Hibernians vs. Tarxien Rainbows vs. St.lucia
- Balzan vs. Lija Athletic
- The Old Derby: Ħamrun Spartans vs. Marsa
- Cottonera Rivalries: Senglea Athletic vs. Vittoriosa Stars vs. St. George's FC
- Għaxaq FC vs. Gudja United
- Pembroke Athleta vs. St. Andrews FC vs. Melita vs. Swieqi United
- Attard vs. Balzan
- Birkirkara vs. Balzan
- Żabbar St. Patrick vs. Żejtun Corinthians
- Żabbar St. Patrick vs. Xgħajra Tornadoes
- Sirens vs. Mellieħa S.C.
- Mtarfa vs. Mdina Knights vs. Rabat Ajax vs. Dingli Swallows
- Siggiewi FC vs. Żebbuġ Rangers
- San Gwann vs. Swieqi United
- Msida St.Joseph vs. Ta' Xbiex
- Għargħur vs. Naxxar Lions
- Qormi FC vs. Żebbuġ Rangers
- Kalkara vs. Xgħajra Tornadoes
- Kalkara vs. St. George's F.C.
- Gudja United vs. St.lucia
- St. George's FC vs. Fgura United

== Moldova ==
- El Clasico de Moldova / Derbiul Moldovei : Zimbru Chișinău vs. Sheriff Tiraspol
- Derby-ul capitalei: Zimbru Chișinău vs. Dacia Chișinău
- Chișinău–Orhei derby: Zimbru Chișinău or Dacia Chișinău vs. Milsami Orhei

== Montenegro ==
- Montenegrin derby: Sutjeska Nikšić vs. Budućnost Podgorica
- Nikšić derby: Sutjeska Nikšić vs. Čelik Nikšić
- Podgorica derby: Budućnost Podgorica vs. OFK Titograd Podgorica
- Coastal derby: OFK Petrovac vs. FK Mogren vs. OFK Grbalj vs FK Bokelj vs. FK Otrant-Olympic
- Albanian-Montenegrin rivalry : Budućnost Podgorica vs FK Dečić

== North Macedonia ==
- Eternal derby: Vardar Skopje vs. Pelister Bitola
- Albanian derby of North Macedonia: Shkendija Tetovo vs. Shkupi
- Skopje derbies:
  - Old Skopje derby: Vardar Skopje vs. Rabotnicki
  - Ethnic derby: Vardar Skopje vs. Shkupi formerly against now defunct predecessor Sloga Jugomagnat
  - Dračevo derby: SSK Mladinec vs. FK Dračevo
  - Lisiče derby: FK Gorno Lisiče vs. Pobeda Dolno Lisiče
  - Karpoš derby: FK Alumina vs. Lokomotiva Karpoš
- Tetovo derby: Teteks vs. Shkendija
- Tetovo rivalry: Teteks vs. Ljuboten
- Vardar–Shkendija rivalry: Shkendija Tetovo vs. Vardar Skopje
- Pelagonia derby: Pelister Bitola vs. Pobeda Prilep
- Winegrowers derby: Tikves Kavadarci vs. Vardar Negotino
- Lake derby: FK Ohrid vs. Karaorman Struga
- Rice derby: Osogovo Kochani vs. Sloga Vinica
- Kichevo derby: Napredok vs. Vlazrimi
- Prilep derby: Pobeda vs. 11 Oktomvri
- East derby: Bregalnica Štip vs. Belasica Strumica
- Brotherhood derby: Teteks Tetovo vs. Vardar Skopje
- Pijanec derby: Bregalnica Delčevo vs. Sasa Makedonska Kamenica
- Maleshevo derby: Maleš Berovo vs. Napredok Pehčevo
- Cheshinovo–Obleshevo derby: FK Cheshinovo vs. FK Obleshevo
- Miners derby: Rudar Probistip vs. Sasa Makedonska Kamenica

== Norway ==
- Battle of Oslo: Vålerenga Fotball vs. Lyn Fotball
- The Classic: Rosenborg BK vs SK Brann
- Lillestrøm–Vålerenga rivalry: Lillestrøm SK vs. Vålerenga Fotball
- Molde–Rosenborg rivalry: Molde FK vs. Rosenborg BK
- Kristiansund BK vs. Molde FK
- Østfold derby: Sarpsborg FK/Sarpsborg 08 vs. Fredrikstad FK
- Østfold derby: Moss FK vs. Fredrikstad FK
- Ælv Classico: Strømsgodset IF vs. Mjøndalen IF
- SK Brann vs. Vålerenga Fotball
- North Norway derby: FK Bodø/Glimt vs. Tromsø IL
- Aalesunds FK vs. Molde FK
- IL Stålkameratene vs Mo IL
- Viking FK vs. FK Haugesund
- SK Brann vs. Viking FK
- Romeriksderbyet: Lillestrøm SK vs. Strømmen IF
- Skeid Fotball vs. Vålerenga Fotball

== Portugal ==
- Historical classics: rivalries between the Big Three
  - O Clássico: S.L. Benfica vs. FC Porto
  - Derby de Lisboa: S.L. Benfica vs. Sporting CP
  - FC Porto vs. Sporting CP rivalry
- Other big derbies
  - Derby da Invicta: Boavista vs. FC Porto from the city of Porto
  - Derby do Minho: Vitória SC vs. SC Braga from the Minho region
  - Derby da Madeira: CS Marítimo vs. CF União vs. CD Nacional
  - Vitória SC vs. Boavista FC rivalry
- Other small derbies
  - The Small Lisbon derby: Belenenses vs. Atlético
  - Derby do Algarve: Farense vs. Olhanense vs. Portimonense
  - Derby de Coimbra: Académica de Coimbra vs. União de Coimbra
  - Derby do Centro: Leiria–Coimbra–Aveiro rivalry: União de Leiria vs. Académica vs. Beira Mar
  - Derby do Mar: Póvoa de Varzim–Vila do Conde–Leça da Palmeira–Matosinhos rivalry: Varzim SC vs. Rio Ave FC vs. Leixões SC vs. Leça FC

== Romania ==
- București derbies:
  - Eternal derby: Steaua București vs. Dinamo București
  - Big București derby:
    - București derby: Steaua București vs. Rapid București
    - Dinamo București vs. Rapid București
  - Small/Traditional Bucureşti derby: Sportul Studențesc vs. Progresul București
  - Any match between Progresul București or Sportul Studențesc vs. Rapid București or FCSB or Dinamo București
- Cluj derby: Universitatea Cluj vs. CFR Cluj
- West derby: UTA Arad vs. Politehnica Timișoara
- Former Ploiești derby: Petrolul Ploiești vs. Astra Giurgiu
- Primvs derby: Petrolul Ploieşti vs. Rapid București
- Pride derby: Dinamo Bucharest vs CSU Craiova or FCU Craiova
- Oltenia derby: CSU Craiova or FCU Craiova vs. Pandurii Târgu Jiu
- Craiova derby: CSU Craiova vs. FCU Craiova
- Hunedoara derby: Corvinul Hunedoara vs. Jiul Petroșani
- Moldova derby: Politehnica Iași vs. Oțelul Galați
- North-East derby: FC Botoşani vs Foresta Suceava vs Politehnica Iași
- Lower Danube derby: Oțelul Galați vs. Dacia Unirea Brăila or Farul Constanța
- North derby: Olimpia Satu Mare vs. FCM Baia Mare
- Crișana derby: FC Bihor Oradea vs. UTA Arad

== Serbia ==
- Belgrade derbies:
  - Eternal derby: Red Star Belgrade vs. Partizan Belgrade
  - OFK Belgrade vs. Red Star Belgrade
  - OFK Belgrade vs. Partizan Belgrade
  - Rad Belgrade vs. Red Star Belgrade
  - OFK Belgrade vs. Rad Belgrade
  - Rad Belgrade vs. Partizan Belgrade
  - FK Voždovac vs. Rad Belgrade
  - FK Zemun vs. OFK Belgrade, Partizan Belgrade or Red Star Belgrade
- Derby of Serbia: Vojvodina Novi Sad vs. Red Star Belgrade or Partizan Belgrade
- Novi Sad derby: Vojvodina Novi Sad vs. FK Novi Sad or FK Mladost GAT
- Derbi nizije (Lowland derby) or Derbi ravnice (Plain derby): Vojvodina Novi Sad vs. Spartak Subotica
- Severnobački derby : Spartak Subotica vs. FK TSC
- Political derby: FK Rad vs. FK Novi Pazar
- Šumadija derby: Radnički Kragujevac vs. FK Smederevo
- South Serbian derby: GFK Dubočica vs. Radnički Niš
- Serbian El Clasico: Napredak Kruševac vs. Radnički Niš
- Rivalry for the Southern Railway: Radnički Niš vs. Partizan Belgrade

== Slovakia ==
- Traditional derby: Slovan Bratislava vs. Spartak Trnava
- Bratislava derby: Slovan Bratislava vs. Inter Bratislava vs. FC Petržalka
- DAC–Slovan derby: Slovan Bratislava vs. DAC Dunajská Streda
- Košice Derby: Lokomotíva Košice vs. VSS Košice
- North-Slovak derby: MŠK Žilina vs. AS Trenčín
- Over the hill derby: MFK Ružomberok vs. FK Dukla Banská Bystrica
- Eastern Slovak derby: FC Košice vs. Tatran Prešov
- Záhorie–Kopanice derby: FK Senica vs. Spartak Myjava

== Slovenia ==
- Eternal Derby of Slovenia: NK Maribor vs. NK Olimpija Ljubljana
- Slovene Littoral derby: FC Koper vs. ND Gorica or ND Primorje
- Prekmurje derby: NŠ Mura vs. NK Nafta 1903
- Prekmurje–Styria derby: NK Maribor vs. NŠ Mura
- Styrian derby: NK Maribor vs. NK Celje
- Zasavje derby: NK Zagorje vs. Rudar Trbovlje
- Domžale derby: NK Domžale vs. NK Radomlje
- Ljubljana derby: NK Olimpija Ljubljana vs. NK Bravo

== Switzerland ==
- Die Klassikier rivalry: FC Basel vs. Grasshoppers, Young Boys or FC Zürich
- Zürich Derby: Grasshoppers vs. FC Zürich
- Bernese Derby: Young Boys vs. FC Thun
- Luzerner Derby: FC Luzern vs. SC Kriens
- St. Gallen Derby: FC St.Gallen vs. FC Wil
- FC St.Gallen vs. FC Luzern
- Lac Leman Derby: Servette FC vs. FC Lausanne-Sports
- Zentralschweizer Derby: SC Cham vs. SC Kriens
- Derby Romand :
  - FC Sion vs. FC Lausanne-Sports
  - Neuchâtel Xamax FCS vs. FC Sion
  - Neuchâtel Xamax FCS vs. FC Lausanne-Sports
- Neuchâtel –Geneva Derby: Neuchâtel Xamax vs. Servette FC
- Derby del Ticino : FC Chiasso vs. AC Bellinzona vs. FC Lugano
- Derby du Rhône : Servette FC vs. FC Sion
- Derby de Lausanne: FC Lausanne-Sports vs. FC Stade Lausanne-Ouchy
- Derby de Vaud: Yverdon Sport vs. FC Lausanne-Sports
- Derby Neuchâtelois: Yverdon Sport vs. Neuchâtel Xamax FCS
- Aargau Derby: FC Aarau vs. Fc Wohlen or Fc Baden
- Zurich Canton Derby: Winterthur vs. Grasshoppers or FC Zürich

== Ukraine ==
- Ukrainian derby (Ukrainian Classic): Dynamo Kyiv vs. Shakhtar Donetsk
- Kyiv derbies
  - Main Kyiv derby: Arsenal Kyiv vs. Dynamo Kyiv
  - Minor Kyiv derby: FC Obolon Kyiv vs. FC CSKA Kyiv
  - Any match between Arsenal Kyiv, FC CSKA Kyiv, Dynamo Kyiv, FC Livyi Bereh Kyiv, FC Obolon Kyiv
- Donetsk derbies
  - Main Donetsk derby: Shakhtar Donetsk vs. Metalurh Donetsk
  - Any match between Shakhtar Donetsk, Metalurh Donetsk, FC Olimpik Donetsk
- Dnipro–Kharkiv derby (East Ukrainian Classic): Metalist Kharkiv vs. FC Dnipro
- Dnipro–Dynamo rivalry: Dynamo Kyiv vs. FC Dnipro
- Lviv derby:
  - Any match between FC Lviv, FC Karpaty Lviv, FC Rukh Lviv
- Zaporizhzhia derby: FC Metalurh Zaporizhzhia vs. FC Torpedo Zaporizhzhia
- Odesa derby: FC Chornomorets Odesa vs. SC Odesa (formerly with SKA Odesa)
- Galicia–Volhynia derby (rivalry): FC Karpaty Lviv vs. FC Volyn Lutsk
- Main Volhynia derby: FC Volyn Lutsk vs. FC Veres Rivne
- Main Podillia derby: FC Nyva Vinnytsia vs. FC Podillya Khmelnytskyi
- Main Donbas rivalry: FC Shakhtar Donetsk vs. FC Zorya Luhansk, also can included Metalurh Donetsk, Stal Alchevsk
- Kropyvnytskyi rivalry: FC Oleksandriya vs. FC Zirka Kropyvnytskyi
- Metalurh derby (former): Metalurh Donetsk vs. FC Metalurh Zaporizhzhia
- Dnipro river derby: FC Metalurh Zaporizhzhia vs. FC Dnipro or Dynamo Kyiv

== Wales ==
- South Wales derby: Swansea City A.F.C. vs. Cardiff City F.C.
- Severnside derby: Cardiff City F.C. vs. Bristol City F.C.
- Cross-border derby: Chester City F.C. vs. Wrexham A.F.C.
- North Wales derby: Bangor City F.C. vs. Rhyl F.C.
- Barry Town United F.C. vs. Merthyr Tydfil F.C. Rivalry
- Gwynedd derby: Bangor City F.C. vs. Caernarfon Town F.C. (Usually)
- Llandudno F.C. vs. Colwyn Bay F.C. Rivalry
