= Armen Stepanyan =

Russian footballer and manager

Personal information
- Full name: Armen Mikhailovich Stepanyan
- Date of birth: 30 January 1974 (age 52)
- Height: 1.70 m (5 ft 7 in)
- Positions: Forward; midfielder

Senior career*
Years	Team	Apps	(Gls)
1991	FC Mashuk Pyatigorsk	2	(0)
1991–1992	FC Lokomotiv Mineralnye Vody	23	(2)
1992	FC Niva Slavyansk-na-Kubani	17	(0)
1993	FC Beshtau Lermontov	9	(0)
1993	FC Nart Cherkessk	17	(2)
1994	FC Olimp Kislovodsk	25	(1)
1996–1997	FC Beshtau Lermontov	54	(27)
1998	FC Torpedo Georgiyevsk	14	(4)
2000	FC Mashuk-KMV Pyatigorsk	18	(2)
2001	FC Kavkazkabel Prokhladny	1	(0)
2001	FC Mashuk Pyatigorsk	5	(0)
2013	FC Olimp Suvorovskaya		

Managerial career
- 2014–2015: FC Mashuk-KMV Pyatigorsk
- 2018: FC Ararat Yerevan
- * Club domestic league appearances and goals

Armen Mikhailovich Stepanyan (Russian: Армен Михайлович Степанян; born 30 January 1974) is a Russian football manager and a former player.
