= Artyom Simonyan (footballer) =

Armenian footballer (born 1995)

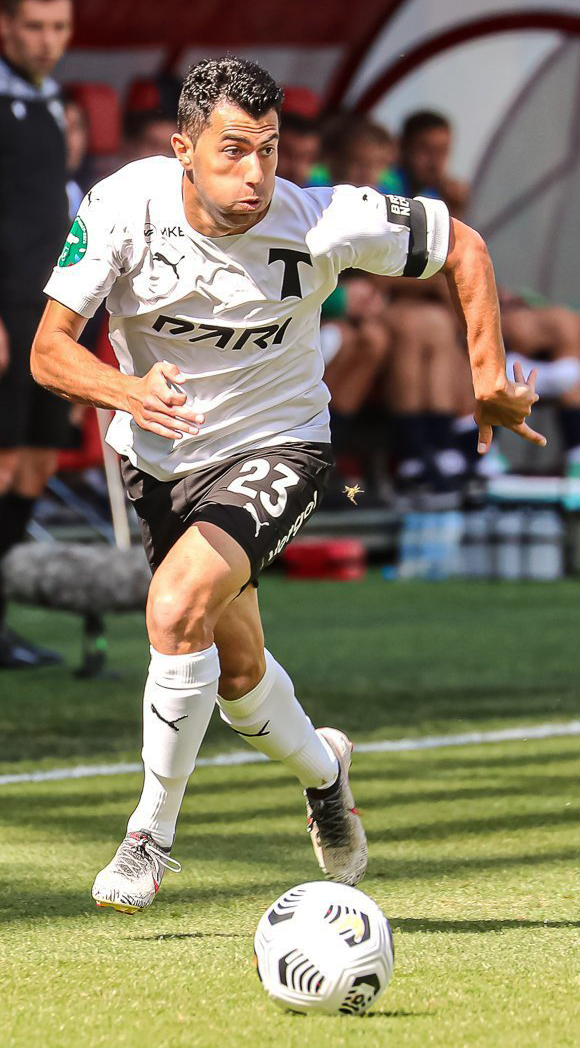
- Simonyan with Torpedo Moscow in 2022

Personal information
- Full name: Artyom Vruyrovich Simonyan
- Date of birth: 20 February 1995 (age 31)
- Place of birth: Saint Petersburg, Russia
- Height: 1.75 m (5 ft 9 in)
- Positions: Right winger; attacking midfielder

Team information
- Current team: Rotor Volgograd
- Number: 10

Youth career
- 2001–2002: SDYuShOR Zenit Saint-Petersburg
- 2003–2012: DYuSSh Smena-Zenit
- 2012–2015: Zenit Saint Petersburg

Senior career*
Years	Team	Apps	(Gls)
2015–2017	Zürich	12	(1)
2015	→ Zürich B	14	(1)
2016–2017	→ Le Mont (loan)	4	(0)
2017–2018	Alashkert	32	(3)
2019	Ararat Yerevan	15	(6)
2019–2020	Pyunik	19	(3)
2020	Noah	9	(3)
2021	Tom Tomsk	16	(4)
2021–2022	Volgar Astrakhan	28	(9)
2022	Torpedo Moscow	2	(0)
2023–2025	SKA-Khabarovsk	71	(8)
2025–	Rotor Volgograd	28	(3)

International career^{‡}
2011	Armenia U17	4	(0)
2013	Armenia U19	3	(1)
2013–2016	Armenia U21	15	(3)
2014–	Armenia	10	(0)
- * Club domestic league appearances and goals as of 16 May 2026 ‡ National team caps and goals as of 18 November 2019

Artyom Vruyrovich Simonyan (Armenian: Արտյոմ Սիմոնյան; Russian: Артём Вруйрович Симонян; born 20 February 1995) is an Armenian footballer who plays as a right winger for Russian club Rotor Volgograd. Born in Russia, he plays for the Armenia national team.

== Career ==
=== Club ===
On 9 August 2017, Simonyan signed for FC Alashkert.

On 2 July 2020, FC Pyunik announced that Simonyan had left the club after his contract had expired.

On 17 January 2021, Tom Tomsk announced the signing of Simonyan on a contract until the end of the 2020–21 season.

On 14 July 2022, Simonyan signed a one-year contract with Russian Premier League club Torpedo Moscow. Simonyan's contract with Torpedo was terminated by mutual consent in late 2022.

On 15 February 2023, Simonyan signed for SKA-Khabarovsk on an 18-month contract.

In June 2025, he signed a contract with Rotor Volgograd.

== Career statistics ==
=== Club ===
As of match played 23 May 2026

Appearances and goals by club, season and competition
Club	Season	League			National Cup		Continental		Other		Total	
Club	Season	Division	Apps	Goals	Apps	Goals	Apps	Goals	Apps	Goals	Apps	Goals
Zenit St.Petersburg	2013–14	Russian Premier League	0	0	0	0	0	0	0	0	0	0
Zürich II	2014–15	Swiss Promotion League	10	1	—		—		—		10	1
Zürich II	2015–16	Swiss Promotion League	4	0	—		—		—		4	0
Zürich II	Total		14	1	0	0	0	0	0	0	14	1
Zürich	2015–16	Swiss Super League	12	1	1	0	1 (Note: Appearances in the UEFA Europa League)	0	—		14	1
Le Mont (loan)	2016–17	Swiss Challenge League	4	0	0	0	—		—		4	0
Alashkert	2017–18	Armenian Premier League	25	3	2	0	0 (Note: Appearances in the UEFA Champions League)	0	1 (Note: Appearance in the Armenian Supercup)	0	27	3
Alashkert	2018–19	Armenian Premier League	7	0	1	0	4 (Note: Two appearances in the UEFA Champions League, and two appearances in UEFA Europa League)	0	1	0	13	0
Alashkert	Total		32	3	3	0	4	0	2	0	41	3
Ararat Yerevan	2018–19	Armenian Premier League	15	6	0	0	—		—		15	6
Pyunik	2019–20	Armenian Premier League	19	3	1	0	6	1	—		26	4
Noah	2020–21	Armenian Premier League	9	3	0	0	1	0	1	0	11	3
Tom Tomsk	2020–21	Russian First League	16	4	0	0	—		—		16	4
Volgar Astrakhan	2021–22	Russian First League	28	9	0	0	—		—		28	9
Torpedo Moscow	2022–23	Russian Premier League	2	0	2	0	—		—		4	0
SKA-Khabarovsk	2022–23	Russian First League	10	1	—		—		—		10	1
SKA-Khabarovsk	2023–24	Russian First League	30	2	2	0	—		—		32	2
SKA-Khabarovsk	2024–25	Russian First League	31	5	0	0	—		—		31	5
SKA-Khabarovsk	Total		71	8	2	0	0	0	0	0	73	8
Rotor Volgograd	2025–26	Russian First League	28	3	1	0	—		2 (Note: Appearances in promotion play-offs)	0	32	3
Career total			250	41	10	0	12	1	5	0	277	42

=== International ===
As of match played 18 November 2019

Appearances and goals by national team and year
National team	Year	Apps	Goals
Armenia	2014	1	0
Armenia	2015	2	0
Armenia	2017	3	0
Armenia	2018	3	0
Armenia	2019	1	0
Total		10	0

== Honours ==
Zürich

- Swiss Cup: 2015–16

Alashkert

- Armenian Premier League: 2017–18
- Armenian Cup: 2018–19
- Armenian Supercup: 2018

Noah

- Armenian Supercup: 2020
