= Magomed Abidinov =

Russian footballer

Personal information
- Full name: Magomed Magomedbasarovich Abidinov
- Date of birth: 3 February 1989 (age 37)
- Place of birth: Gubden, Karabudakhkentsky District, Dagestan ASSR, Russian SFSR, Soviet Union
- Height: 1.88 m (6 ft 2 in)
- Position: Defender

Senior career*
Years	Team	Apps	(Gls)
2010	Anzhi Makhachkala	0	(0)
2011–2014	Dagdizel Kaspiysk	74	(0)
2014–2017	Mashuk-KMV Pyatigorsk	77	(4)
2017	Spartak Nalchik	8	(0)
2018	Legion Dynamo Makhachkala	11	(0)
2018–2019	Ararat Yerevan	5	(0)
2019–2020	Legion Dynamo Makhachkala	11	(0)
- * Club domestic league appearances and goals

Magomed Magomedbasarovich Abidinov (Russian: Магомед Магомедбасарович Абидинов; born 3 February 1989) is a Russian former footballer.

== Career ==
Abidinov made his professional debut for Anzhi Makhachkala on 14 July 2010 in the Russian Cup game against FC Pskov-747.
