= Andrey Chukhley =

Belarusian football midfielder

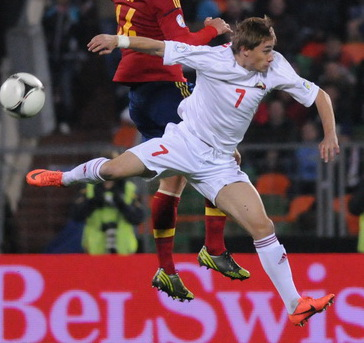

Personal information
- Date of birth: 2 October 1987 (age 39)
- Place of birth: Minsk, Belarusian SSR
- Height: 1.75 m (5 ft 9 in)
- Position: Midfielder

Youth career
- 2004–2005: Dinamo Minsk

Senior career*
| Years | Team | Apps | (Gls) |
| 2004–2010 | Dinamo Minsk | 95 | (8) |
| 2004 | → Dinamo-Juni Minsk | 9 | (0) |
| 2004 | → Darida Minsk Raion (loan) | 0 | (0) |
| 2011–2014 | Ural Sverdlovsk Oblast | 50 | (2) |
| 2014 | Tyumen | 13 | (0) |
| 2015 | Minsk | 10 | (0) |
| 2015 | Vitebsk | 11 | (1) |
| 2016 | Neman Grodno | 5 | (0) |
| 2016 | Kauno Žalgiris | 7 | (0) |
| 2017 | Jonava | 10 | (0) |
| 2017 | Smolevichi-STI | 13 | (1) |
| 2018 | Dnepr Mogilev | 17 | (1) |
| 2019 | Ararat Yerevan | 3 | (0) |
| 2019–2022 | Slavia Mozyr | 72 | (10) |
| 2023 | Ostrovets | 22 | (2) |

International career
| 2008–2009 | Belarus U21 | 7 | (0) |
| 2008–2014 | Belarus | 7 | (0) |
- * Club domestic league appearances and goals

Andrey Chukhley (Belarusian: Андрэй Чухлей; Russian: Андрей Чухлей; born 2 October 1987) is a Belarusian former football midfielder.

== Career ==
Chukhley left FC Tyumen in December 2014.

On 11 August 2016, Andrey Chukhley joined A Lyga club Kauno Žalgiris. He moved to another A Lyga team Jonava in 2016–17 winter transfer window, but decided to leave the club after 4 months.

On 19 March 2019, Chukhley left Ararat Yerevan by mutual consent.
