= Sim Woon-sub =

South Korean footballer

Personal information
- Full name: Sim Woon-sub
- Date of birth: 24 February 1990 (age 36)
- Place of birth: Gangneung, South Korea
- Height: 1.76 m (5 ft 9 1/2 in)
- Position: Midfielder

Team information
- Current team: Western Knights
- Number: 8

Youth career
- 2005–2007: Gangneung Jeil High School
- 2008–2011: Halla University

Senior career*
| Years | Team | Apps | (Gls) |
| 2012 | Nay Pyi Taw | 13 | (3) |
| 2013 | Nay Pyi Taw | 5 | |
| 2014 | Vissai Ninh Bình | 17 | (2) |
| 2014 | Đồng Tâm Long An | 7 | (1) |
| 2015 | Ayeyawady United | 33 | (2) |
| 2016 | Phnom Penh Crown | 4 | (0) |
| 2016–2017 | Kuantan | 36 | (6) |
| 2017 | Long An | 2 | (0) |
| 2018 | PDRM | 27 | (6) |
| 2019 | Ararat Yerevan | 6 | (0) |
| 2019–2020 | Gimpo Citizen | 4 | (0) |
| 2021–2022 | Yangju Citizen | 31 | (2) |
| 2022 | Tainan City | 16 | (2) |
| 2023 | Sham Shui Po | 11 | (0) |
| 2024 | Shellharbour | | |
| 2025 | Wollongong Wolves | 21 | (0) |
| 2026– | Western Knights | 12 | (0) |
- * Club domestic league appearances and goals as of 2 June 2026

- Sim Woon-sub
- Hangul: 심운섭
- Hanja: 沈云燮
- RR: Sim Unseop
- MR: Sim Unsŏp

Sim Woon-sub (a.k.a. Shim Un-seob; Korean: 심운섭; born 24 February 1990) is a South Korean professional footballer who plays as a midfielder for National Premier Leagues Western Australia club Western Knights.

== Club career ==
After finishing university in South Korea in 2012, Sim was unable find a home with any Korean clubs. To start his professional career, he left Korea with 2 other players to find a club to sign with. Sim signed with Myanmar National League side Nay Pyi Taw.

In 2015, Sim joined Myanmar National League and signed a year-long contract with the local team Ayeyawady United. During his stay at the club, he made 33 appearances from the start out of 35 in which all of them he played full 90 minutes. He also played in 15 matches out of 16 in the 2015 AFC Cup.

On 20 May 2019, Ararat Yerevan announced that they had terminated Sim's contract by mutual consent.

On 11 January 2023, Sim joined Sham Shui Po.

On 12 October 2025, Sim was fielded in the Wollongong Wolves starting lineup against Heidelberg United FC, losing 3-0, during which he gained the nickname "Soon-Yi Duck" from the local Wollongong crowd.

== Honours ==
Vissai Ninh Bình

- Vietnamese Super Cup : 2013
