= Dejan Vukomanović =

Bosnian-Herzegovinian footballer

Dejan Vukomanović Дејан Вукомановић
Personal information
- Full name: Dejan Vukomanović
- Date of birth: 31 October 1990 (age 36)
- Place of birth: Tuzla, SFR Yugoslavia
- Height: 1.83 m (6 ft 0 in)
- Position: Central midfielder

Senior career*
| Years | Team | Apps | (Gls) |
| 2006–2011 | Palilulac Beograd | 104 | (4) |
| 2011 | BSK Borča | 4 | (0) |
| 2012–2014 | Gandzasar Kapan | 72 | (6) |
| 2015–2016 | Zrinjski Mostar | 3 | (1) |
| 2015 | → Inđija (loan) | 15 | (3) |
| 2016 | → Olimpik (loan) | 11 | (1) |
| 2016–2017 | Hapoel Katamon Jerusalem | 7 | (0) |
| 2017 | Olimpik | 11 | (0) |
| 2017–2018 | Novi Pazar | 15 | (2) |
| 2019 | Ararat Yerevan | 13 | (1) |
| 2019 | BSK Borča | | |
| 2020-2022 | PKB Padinska Skela | | |
- * Club domestic league appearances and goals as of 20:52, 20 August 2019 (UTC)

Dejan Vukomanović (Serbian Cyrillic: Дејан Вукомановић; born 31 October 1990) is a Bosnian-Herzegovinian football midfielder who most recently played for BSK Borča.

== Club career ==
Born in Tuzla, SR Bosnia and Herzegovina, then still within Yugoslavia, Vukomanović played in Serbia with FK Palilulac in the Serbian League Belgrade since 2006 until he signed with BSK Borča in summer 2011 and played with them in the first half of the 2011–12 Serbian SuperLiga. In January 2015, he signed a two-and-a-half-year contract with Zrinjski Mostar, but was loaned to Olimpik in January 2016.

In summer 2016 he joined Israeli club Hapoel Katamon Jerusalem, but he returned to Olimpik Sarajevo in January 2017.
