= David Azin =

German-Armenian footballer

Personal information
- Full name: David Michele Azin
- Date of birth: 11 January 1990 (age 36)
- Place of birth: Cologne, Germany
- Height: 1.83 m (6 ft 0 in)
- Position: Midfielder

Team information
- Current team: Persela Lamongan
- Number: 79

Youth career
- –2005: SpVg Porz-Gremberghoven
- 2005–2008: 1. Köln
- 2009: Cienciano

Senior career*
Years	Team	Apps	(Gls)
2009–2011	Pyunik		
2012	Assyriska	15	(0)
2013	Ebbsfleet United	2	(0)
2013	FF Jaro	8	(0)
2014	União da Madeira	7	(0)
2015–2016	Wegberg-Beeck	22	(0)
2017	Eldense	9	(0)
2018–2019	Ararat Yerevan	8	(0)
2020-	Persela Lamongan	0	(0)

International career^{‡}
2018–	Western Armenia	2	(0)
- * Club domestic league appearances and goals as of 00:09, 27 May 2019 (UTC) ‡ National team caps and goals as of 20 September 2018

David Michele Azin (born 11 January 1990) is a German-Armenian footballer who currently plays as a midfielder for Indonesian Liga 1 club Persela Lamongan.

== Career ==
=== Club ===
On 22 February 2012, Azin signed a two-year contract with Assyriska FF, but the contract was terminated by mutual consent on 13 November 2012.

At the end of March 2013, Azin signed for English fifth tier club Ebbsfleet United.

In August 2018, Azin signed for FC Ararat Yerevan.

=== International ===
Azin represented Western Armenia at the 2018 CONIFA World Football Cup.
