= Mykhaylo Kaluhin =

Ukrainian footballer (born 1994)

Mykhailo Kalugin
Personal information
- Full name: Mykhailo Petrovich Kalugin
- Date of birth: 20 November 1994 (age 31)
- Place of birth: Kharkiv, Ukraine
- Height: 1.88 m (6 ft 2 in)
- Position: Centre-back

Youth career
- 2008: Metalist Kharkiv
- 2009: Helios Kharkiv
- 2010–2011: FC Vostok Kharkiv

Senior career*
Years	Team	Apps	(Gls)
2011–2012	Illichivets Mariupol	0	(0)
2012	→ Illichivets-2 Mariupol	4	(0)
2012–2013	Metalist Kharkiv	0	(0)
2014–2015	Bodva Moldava nad Bodvou	13	(0)
2015	Bukovyna Chernivtsi	5	(0)
2016–2017	Krumkachy Minsk	40	(1)
2017–2018	Torpedo-BelAZ Zhodino	12	(2)
2018	Isloch Minsk Raion	9	(0)
2019	Ararat Yerevan	7	(0)
2019	Dnyapro Mogilev	3	(0)
2020	Chornomorets Odesa	0	(0)
2020	Rukh Lviv	0	(0)
2020	Hirnyk-Sport Horishni Plavni	5	(0)
2021	LNZ Cherkasy		
2021–2022	Olimpiya Savyntsi	4	(1)
2022–2023	Abdysh-Ata Kant	49	(1)
2024	Muras United	12	(1)
2024	Persipal Palu	19	(1)
2025	Abdysh-Ata	9	(0)
2025–2026	Bekasi City	18	(0)
- * Club domestic league appearances and goals as of 6 April 2026

Mykhailo Kalugin (Ukrainian: Калугін Михайло Петрович; born 20 November 1994) is a Ukrainian professional footballer who plays as a centre-back.

== Career ==
In February 2016, Kaluhin signed a two-year contract with Belarusian Premier League club Krumkachy Minsk.

On 4 March 2025, Kaluhin was announced as part of Abdysh-Ata's squad for the 2025 season.
