= Andriy Yakovlyev =

Ukrainian footballer

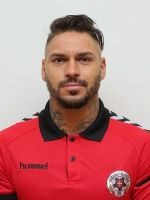

Personal information
- Full name: Andriy Valentynovych Yakovlyev
- Date of birth: 20 February 1989 (age 37)
- Place of birth: Kharkiv, Ukrainian SSR, Soviet Union
- Height: 1.80 m (5 ft 11 in)
- Position: Left winger

Team information
- Current team: Słowianin Wolibórz
- Number: 16

Youth career
- 2002: Inter Kharkiv
- 2003–2005: Maharach
- 2005–2006: Shakhtar Donetsk

Senior career*
Years	Team	Apps	(Gls)
2006	Shakhtar-3 Donetsk	2	(0)
2007	Stal Dniprodzerzhynsk	12	(0)
2007–2008	JFK Olimps	30	(0)
2010	Metalurh Donetsk	0	(0)
2010	Nasaf Qarshi	11	(0)
2011–2012	Poltava	13	(2)
2012	→ Tatran Prešov (loan)	7	(0)
2012–2013	Tatran Prešov	23	(1)
2014	Slutsk	17	(2)
2014	BATE Borisov	6	(2)
2015	Sokol Saratov	12	(2)
2015–2016	Zaria Bălți	19	(3)
2016	Taraz	16	(2)
2017	Niki Volos	0	(0)
2018	Volyn Lutsk	23	(9)
2019	Ararat Yerevan	10	(0)
2019	Palanga	9	(0)
2020–2021	Speranța Nisporeni	30	(3)
2021	Kraft	10	(2)
2022	Terracina		
2023	San Luca	18	(0)
2023	Rieti		
2023–2025	Bacigalupo Vasto Marina		
2025	JKS Jarosław	16	(1)
2025–	Słowianin Wolibórz	1	(0)

International career
- Ukraine U17
- * Club domestic league appearances and goals as of 15:11, 19 August 2025 (UTC)

Andriy Valentynovych Yakovlyev (Ukrainian: Андрій Валентинович Яковлєв; born 20 February 1989), is a Ukrainian professional footballer who plays as a left winger for Polish club Słowianin Wolibórz.

== Honours ==
BATE Borisov

- Belarusian Premier League: 2014

Zaria Bălți

- Moldovan Cup: 2015–16
