= 2019–20 FC Yerevan season =

Yerevan
2019–20 season
- President: Karen Harutyunyan
- Manager: Nebojša Petrović (until 5 September); Georgi Ghazaryan (Caretaker) (5 September-16 September); Vlad Goian (16 September-4 October); António Caldas (4 October-11 November)
- Stadium: Vanadzor City Stadium
- Premier League: 10th
- Armenian Cup: Second Round vs Sevan
- Top goalscorer: League: Ramazan Isayev (6); All: Ramazan Isayev (6)
Home colours	Away colours

The 2019–20 season was a FC Yerevan's first season back in the Armenian Premier League since their re-formation in July 2018.

== Season events ==
On 5 September, Nebojša Petrović was relieved of his duties as Yerevan's manager, with Assistant Coach Georgi Ghazaryan being placed in temporary charge for Yerevans games against Lori on 13 September. On 16 September, Vlad Goian was appointed as Manager on a one-year contract, before being relieved of his duties and replaced by António Caldas on 4 October.. Caldas then resigned on 11 November 2019 following a 7-2 defeat to Ararat-Armenia.

In February 2020, the clubs Facebook page stated that instead of preparing for the end of the winter break, the club was preparing for court hearings.

On 21 February, the Football Federation of Armenia announced that FC Yerevan had withdrawn from the league due to financial and technical problems.

== Squad ==
As of 31 December 2019

Note: Flags indicate national team as defined under FIFA eligibility rules; some limited exceptions apply. Players may hold more than one non-FIFA nationality.

No.	Pos.	Nation	Player
1	GK	LVA	Jānis Krūmiņš
2	DF	BRA	William Gustavo
3	DF	ARM	Aghavard Petrosyan
4	DF	RUS	Maksim Evstigneev
5	DF	ARM	Argishti Petrosyan
6	MF	ARM	Aram Hovsepyan
8	MF	RUS	Yvgeny Yevgenyev (captain)
10	FW	ARM	Edgar Mkrtchyan
11	MF	ARM	Levon Badalyan
12	DF	RUS	Denis Lyubimov
14	FW	BRA	Jeferson Cruz
17	MF	ARM	Roman Zavialov

No.	Pos.	Nation	Player
18	FW	ARM	Vahe Movsisyan
19	DF	UKR	Sviatoslav Hrabchak
20	MF	IRN	Armin Mir Doraghi
21	MF	COD	Antonio Lokwa
22	DF	BLR	Pavel Demidchik
23	MF	BRA	Elias
25	MF	SEN	Pape Demba Dieye
27	FW	ARM	Gegham Tumbaryan
30	MF	UKR	Dmytro Klimakov
31	FW	COL	Jafett Del Portillo Bolaño
47	MF	BLR	Sergey Lynko
99	GK	ARM	Grigor Makaryan

== Transfers ==
=== In ===
Date	Position	Nationality	Name	From	Fee	Ref.
Summer 2019	DF	(Belarus)	Pavel Demidchik	Smorgon	Undisclosed	
Summer 2019	DF	(Armenia)	Aghavard Petrosyan	Lokomotiv Yerevan	Undisclosed	
Summer 2019	DF	(Armenia)	Argishti Petrosyan	Noah	Undisclosed	
Summer 2019	DF	(Russia)	Maksim Evstigneev		Free	
Summer 2019	MF	(Armenia)	Vladimir Babayan	Lori	Undisclosed	
Summer 2019	MF	(Armenia)	Levon Badalyan	Pyunik	Undisclosed	
Summer 2019	MF	(Armenia)	Aram Hovsepyan	Sevan	Undisclosed	
Summer 2019	MF	(Brazil)	Elias	Haskovo	Undisclosed	
Summer 2019	MF	(Iran)	Armin Mir Doraghi		Free	
Summer 2019	FW	(Brazil)	Jeferson Cruz		Free	
Summer 2019	FW	(Russia)	Ramazan Isayev		Free	
28 August 2019	FW	(Armenia)	Viulen Ayvazyan		Free	
28 August 2019	FW	(Armenia)	Gegham Tumbaryan	Gandzasar Kapan	Undisclosed	
28 August 2019	MF	(Ukraine)	Dmytro Klimakov	Noah	Undisclosed	
28 August 2019	MF	(Belarus)	Sergey Lynko	Torpedo Minsk	Undisclosed	
4 September 2019	DF	(Brazil)	William Gustavo	Lori	Undisclosed	
4 September 2019	MF	(Senegal)	Pape Demba Dieye	Ararat Yerevan	Undisclosed	
25 September 2019	FW	(Colombia)	Jafett Del Portillo Bolaño	ART Municipal Jalapa	Undisclosed	

=== Loans in ===
Date from	Position	Nationality	Name	From	Date to	Ref.
Summer 2019	FW	(Armenia)	Abraham Portugalyan	Urartu	Winter 2020	

=== Out ===
Date	Position	Nationality	Name	To	Fee	Ref.
9 December 2019	FW	(Russia)	Ramazan Isayev	Ararat Yerevan	Undisclosed	

=== Released ===
Date	Position	Nationality	Name	Joined	Date
Summer 2019	GK	(Armenia)	Hovhannes Navasardyan		
Summer 2019	DF	(Armenia)	Norayr Artemyan		
Summer 2019	DF	(Armenia)	Khachik Keheyan		
Summer 2019	DF	(Armenia)	Ivan Mamakhanov		
Summer 2019	DF	(Armenia)	Artur Meliksetyan		
Summer 2019	DF	(Armenia)	Gor Mkrtumyan		
Summer 2019	DF	(Armenia)	Rafik Poghosyan		
Summer 2019	DF	(Armenia)	Khachatur Topalyan		
Summer 2019	DF	(Democratic Republic of the Congo)	Michel Otolorin Falola		
Summer 2019	DF	(Ukraine)	Roman Pomazan		
Summer 2019	MF	(Armenia)	Vladimir Babayan	West Armenia	
Summer 2019	MF	(Armenia)	Samvel Khachikyan		
Summer 2019	MF	(Ivory Coast)	Koubi Fabrice Mondesir		
Summer 2019	MF	(Russia)	Stanislav Yefimov	Pyunik	6 June 2019
Summer 2019	FW	(Democratic Republic of the Congo)	Aristote Va Shibang	Van	
Summer 2019	FW	(Georgia (country))	Irakli Penderava	Lokomotiv Yerevan	
Summer 2019	FW	(Russia)	Ivan Latyshev		
Summer 2019	FW	(Russia)	Sergey Timofeev	Retired	
Winter 2020	FW	(Armenia)	Viulen Ayvazyan		
21 February 2020	GK	(Armenia)	Grigor Makaryan		
21 February 2020	GK	(Latvia)	Jānis Krūmiņš		
21 February 2020	DF	(Armenia)	Aghavard Petrosyan		
21 February 2020	DF	(Armenia)	Argishti Petrosyan	Van	
21 February 2020	DF	(Belarus)	Pavel Demidchik	Oshmyany	
21 February 2020	DF	(Brazil)	William Gustavo		
21 February 2020	DF	(Russia)	Maksim Evstigneev		
21 February 2020	DF	(Russia)	Denis Lyubimov		
21 February 2020	DF	(Ukraine)	Sviatoslav Hrabchak		
21 February 2020	MF	(Armenia)	Levon Badalyan	Ararat Yerevan II	
21 February 2020	MF	(Armenia)	Aram Hovsepyan		
21 February 2020	MF	(Armenia)	Yvgeny Yevgenyev		
21 February 2020	MF	(Armenia)	Roman Zavialov		
21 February 2020	MF	(Belarus)	Sergey Lynko	Krumkachy Minsk	
21 February 2020	MF	(Brazil)	Elias		
21 February 2020	MF	(Democratic Republic of the Congo)	Antonio Lokwa	West Armenia	
21 February 2020	MF	(Iran)	Armin Mir Doraghi		
21 February 2020	MF	(Senegal)	Pape Demba Dieye	West Armenia	
21 February 2020	MF	(Ukraine)	Dmytro Klimakov	Urmia Masis	
21 February 2020	FW	(Armenia)	Edgar Mkrtchyan	Dilijan	
21 February 2020	FW	(Armenia)	Vahe Movsisyan		
21 February 2020	FW	(Armenia)	Gegham Tumbaryan		
21 February 2020	FW	(Brazil)	Jeferson Cruz		
21 February 2020	FW	(Colombia)	Jafett Del Portillo Bolaño		

== Competitions ==
=== Armenian Premier League ===
==== Results summary ====
Overall								Home						Away					
Pld	W	D	L	GF	GA	GD	Pts	W	D	L	GF	GA	GD	W	D	L	GF	GA	GD
15	0	0	15	11	53	−42	0	0	0	7	5	21	−16	0	0	8	6	32	−26

Last updated: 1 December 2019.
Source: See Results

==== Results ====
2 August 2019 1	Ararat Yerevan	1 – 0	Yerevan	Yerevan
19:30 (UTC+4)	Khurtsidze 60'; Kalaydzhyan (yellow card) 90'	Report	E.Evgenev (yellow card) 34'; A.Hovsepyan (yellow card) 85'	Stadium: Vazgen Sargsyan Republican Stadium; Attendance: 150; Referee: Ashot Ghaltakchyan

9 August 2019 2	Yerevan	0 – 1	Noah	Vanadzor
19:30 (UTC+4)	R.Zavialov (yellow card) 61'	Report	Kagermazov (yellow card) 66'; Kryuchkov 71'; Manoyan 76' (pen.)	Stadium: Vanadzor City Stadium; Attendance: 150; Referee: Shahen Aghayan
Note: Match played at the Vanadzor City Stadium in Vanadzor, instead of Yerevan's regular Yerevan Football Academy Stadium in Yerevan.

16 August 2019 3	Shirak	2 – 1	Yerevan	Gyumri
17:00 (UTC+4)	D.Lyubimov 29' (o.g.); M.Bakayoko 41'; Gevorkyan (yellow card) 45'; K.Muradyan (yellow card) 90+2'; Yermakov (yellow card) 90+5'	Report	Ar.Petrosyan (yellow card) 38'; S.Hrabchak 39'; Cruz (yellow card) 61'	Stadium: Gyumri City Stadium; Attendance: 500; Referee: Gevorg Eghoyan

25 August 2019 4	Yerevan	1 – 2	Ararat-Armenia	Yerevan
19:00 (UTC+4)	A.Portugalyan (yellow card) 64'; Isayev 90+3'	Report	Guz 9'; Louis 29'	Stadium: Yerevan Football Academy Stadium; Attendance: 150; Referee: Artur Safaryan

30 August 2019 5	Pyunik	4 – 1	Yerevan	Yerevan
18:00 (UTC+4)	Mahmudov 9', 42'; Simonyan 21'; M.Evstigneev 45+1' (o.g.)	Report	Isayev 84'	Stadium: Yerevan Football Academy Stadium; Attendance: 250; Referee: Henrik Nalbandyan
Note: Match played at the Yerevan Football Academy Stadium in Yerevan, instead of Yerevan's regular Vazgen Sargsyan Republican Stadium in Yerevan.

13 September 2019 6	Yerevan	0 – 1	Lori	Vanadzor
16:00 (UTC+4)	Lynko (yellow card) 67'; D.Klimakov (yellow card) 81'; Y.Yevgenyev (yellow card) 87'; Ar.Petrosyan (yellow card) 90+6'	Report	A.Avagyan 90+3'; L.Macharashvili (yellow card) 90+3'; Désiré (yellow card) 90+6'	Stadium: Vanadzor City Stadium; Attendance: 500; Referee: Zaven Hovhannisyan
Note: Match played at the Vanadzor City Stadium in Vanadzor, instead of Yerevan's regular Yerevan Football Academy Stadium in Yerevan.

17 September 2019 7	Alashkert	5 – 1	Yerevan	Yerevan
16:15 (UTC+4)	Marmentini 10' (pen.); Glišić 14', 47'; M.Manasyan 51'; S.Shahinyan 90'	Report	Isayev 58'; Demidchik (yellow card) 71'; Lynko (yellow card) 75'	Stadium: Alashkert Stadium; Attendance: 500; Referee: Ashot Ghaltakchyan

21 September 2019 8	Yerevan	0 – 1	Urartu	Vanadzor
16:00 (UTC+4)	Demidchik (yellow card) 56'	Report	M.Brtan (yellow card) 44'; Kobzar 64'	Stadium: Vanadzor City Stadium; Attendance: 50; Referee: Edgar Sahakyan
Note: Match played at the Vanadzor City Stadium in Vanadzor, instead of Yerevan's regular Yerevan Football Academy Stadium in Yerevan.

27 September 2019 9	Gandzasar Kapan	2 – 0	Yerevan	Yerevan
16:00 (UTC+4)	A.Adamyan 21'; G.Harutyunyan 54'; Wbeymar (yellow card) 72'	Report	Demidchik (yellow card) 20'	Stadium: Yerevan Football Academy Stadium; Attendance: 300; Referee: Ashot Ghaltakchyan
Note: Match played at the Yerevan Football Academy in Yerevan, instead of Gandzasar Kapan regular Gandzasar Stadium in Kapan.

4 October 2019 10	Yerevan	1 – 3	Ararat Yerevan	Vanadzor
15:00 (UTC+4)	Y.Yevgenyev (yellow card) 18'; Isayev 55'	Report	Logua 15'; Dedechko (yellow card) 32'; Kozlov 45+1'; Badoyan 84'; Toboyev (yellow card) 84'	Stadium: Vanadzor City Stadium; Attendance: 50; Referee: Shahen Aghayan
Note: Match played at the Vanadzor City Stadium in Vanadzor, instead of Yerevan's regular Yerevan Football Academy Stadium in Yerevan.

18 October 2019 11	Noah	3 – 1	Yerevan	Yerevan
15:00 (UTC+4)	Azarov 7', 12'; Deobald 78'	Report	A.Lokwa (yellow card) 68'; Jeferson Cruz 73'	Stadium: Alashkert Stadium; Attendance: 100; Referee: Artur Simonyan
Note: Match played at the Alashkert Stadium in Yerevan, instead of Noah's regular Mika Stadium in Yerevan.

25 October 2019 12	Yerevan	1 – 4	Shirak	Vanadzor
15:00 (UTC+4)	A.Portugalyan 73'; A.Mir Doraghi (yellow card) 90+2'	Report	A.Aslanyan 13'; R.Misakyan 18'; M.Kone 26'; Z.Margaryan (yellow card) 45'; Gevorkyan 60'; A.Tsaturyan (yellow card) 78'; K.Muradyan (yellow card) 90+2'	Stadium: Vanadzor City Stadium; Attendance: 100; Referee: Artur Simonyan
Note: Match played at the Vanadzor City Stadium in Vanadzor, instead of Yerevan's regular Yerevan Football Academy Stadium in Yerevan.

10 November 2019 13	Ararat-Armenia	7 – 2	Yerevan	Yerevan
15:00 (UTC+4)	Kódjo 12' (yellow card) 39'; Ambartsumyan 25'; Kobyalko 26', 56'; Narsingh 50'; Sanogo 85'; Ângelo 90'	Report	Isayev (yellow card) 21' (goal) 29'; Y.Yevgenyev (yellow card) 39'; A.Portugalyan 60'; J.Del Portillo (yellow card) 68'	Stadium: Yerevan Football Academy Stadium; Attendance: 200; Referee: Artush Kerobyan

25 November 2019 14	Yerevan	2 – 8	Pyunik	Vanadzor
14:00 (UTC+4)	A.Mir Doraghi (yellow card) 16'; Isayev 58'; A.Portugalyan 78'; Elias (red card) 84'	Report	Arakelyan 14'; Mahmudov 16' (pen.), 20', 32', 78' (yellow card) 29'; A.Manucharyan 25'; Shevchuk 29'; Stankov (yellow card) 46'; Miranyan 85' (pen.)	Stadium: Vanadzor City Stadium; Attendance: 20; Referee: Henrik Nalbandyan
Note: Match played at the Vanadzor City Stadium in Vanadzor, instead of Yerevan's regular Yerevan Football Academy Stadium in Yerevan.

1 December 2019 15	Lori	8 – 0	Yerevan	Vanadzor
14:30 (UTC+4)	R.Minasyan (yellow card) 13' (goal) 52', 75'; Désiré 32', 59', 61' (pen.), 64', 90+1'; Luiz Matheus 42' (yellow card) 56'	Report		Stadium: Vanadzor Football Academy; Attendance: 100; Referee: Artush Kerobyan

28 February 2020 16	Yerevan	0 – 3	Alashkert	Vanadzor
14:00 (UTC+4)		Report		Stadium: Vanadzor City Stadium
Note: Match awarded as a 3-0 to Alashkert after Yerevan withdrew from the league. Match was due to be played at the Vanadzor City Stadium in Vanadzor, instead of Yerevan's regular Vazgen Sargsyan Republican Stadium in Yerevan.

==== Table ====
Pos	Team	Pld	W	D	L	GF	GA	GD	Pts	Qualification
1	Ararat-Armenia	18	11	3	4	33	15	+18	36	Qualification for the Championship round
2	Lori	18	9	5	4	27	19	+8	32	Qualification for the Championship round
3	Alashkert	18	9	4	5	33	20	+13	31	Qualification for the Championship round
4	Ararat	18	9	4	5	25	18	+7	31	Qualification for the Championship round
5	Noah	18	9	3	6	25	19	+6	30	Qualification for the Championship round
6	Shirak	18	8	4	6	25	18	+7	28	Qualification for the Championship round
7	Pyunik	18	7	2	9	35	36	−1	23	Qualification for the Relegation round
8	Urartu	18	6	5	7	22	24	−2	23	Qualification for the Relegation round
9	Gandzasar	18	4	6	8	20	25	−5	18	Qualification for the Relegation round
10	Yerevan (R, D)	18	0	0	18	11	62	−51	0	Withdrawn

Source: Soccerway
Rules for classification: 1) Points; 2) Play-off (only if deciding champion); 3) Matches won; 4) Head-to-head points; 5) Head-to-head matches won; 6) Head-to-head goal difference; 7) Head-to-head goals scored; 8) Head-to-head away goals scored; 9) Goal difference; 10) Goals scored.
(D) Disqualified; (R) Relegated

Pos	Team	Pld	W	D	L	GF	GA	GD	Pts	Qualification
1	Ararat-Armenia (C)	28	15	7	6	45	23	+22	52	Qualification for the Champions League first qualifying round
2	Noah	28	14	6	8	37	27	+10	48	Qualification for the Europa League first qualifying round (Note: team qualified for the Europa League first qualifying round by winning the 2019–20 Armenian Cup.)
3	Alashkert	28	14	5	9	51	31	+20	47	Qualification for the Europa League first qualifying round
4	Shirak	28	13	7	8	40	30	+10	46	Qualification for the Europa League first qualifying round
5	Lori	27	10	10	7	35	33	+2	40	(Note: Match between Lori and Ararat Yerevan was cancelled on 10 July, with no points being awarded.)
6	Ararat	27	9	6	12	31	36	−5	33	(Note: Match between Lori and Ararat Yerevan was cancelled on 10 July, with no points being awarded.)

Source: Soccerway
Rules for classification: 1) Points; 2) Play-off (only if deciding champion); 3) Matches won; 4) Head-to-head points; 5) Head-to-head matches won; 6) Head-to-head goal difference; 7) Head-to-head goals scored; 8) Head-to-head away goals scored; 9) Goal difference; 10) Goals scored.
(C) Champions
Notes:

Pos	Team	Pld	W	D	L	GF	GA	GD	Pts
1	Urartu	22	8	6	8	26	27	−1	30
2	Pyunik	22	8	2	12	39	42	−3	26
3	Gandzasar	22	6	7	9	25	29	−4	25

Source: Soccerway
Rules for classification: 1) Points; 2) Play-off (only if deciding champion); 3) Matches won; 4) Head-to-head points; 5) Head-to-head matches won; 6) Head-to-head goal difference; 7) Head-to-head goals scored; 8) Head-to-head away goals scored; 9) Goal difference; 10) Goals scored.

=== Armenian Cup ===
2 November 2019 Second Round	Sevan	2 – 0	Yerevan	Dzoraghbyur
14:30 (UTC+4)	A.Gladysh (yellow card) 45'; A.Azatyan 50' (yellow card) 84'; Riabets 90'	Report		Stadium: Dzoraghbyur Training Centre; Attendance: 30; Referee: Artem Gasparyan

== Statistics ==
As of match played 1 December 2019

=== Appearances and goals ===
No.	Pos	Nat	Player	Total		Premier League		Armenian Cup	
No.	Pos	Nat	Player	Apps	Goals	Apps	Goals	Apps	Goals
1	GK	(Latvia) LVA	Jānis Krūmiņš	12	0	11	0	1	0
2	DF	(Brazil) BRA	William Gustavo	5	0	4	0	1	0
3	DF	(Armenia) ARM	Aghavard Petrosyan	7	0	4+3	0	0	0
4	DF	(Russia) RUS	Maksim Evstigneev	7	0	6	0	1	0
5	DF	(Armenia) ARM	Argishti Petrosyan	10	0	10	0	0	0
6	MF	(Armenia) ARM	Aram Hovsepyan	1	0	1	0	0	0
8	MF	(Russia) RUS	Yvgeny Yevgenyev	14	0	13	0	1	0
10	FW	(Armenia) ARM	Edgar Mkrtchyan	9	0	5+4	0	0	0
11	MF	(Armenia) ARM	Levon Badalyan	2	0	1+1	0	0	0
12	DF	(Russia) RUS	Denis Lyubimov	6	0	5	0	1	0
14	FW	(Brazil) BRA	Jeferson Cruz	7	1	4+3	1	0	0
17	MF	(Russia) RUS	Roman Zavialov	9	0	7+1	0	0+1	0
18	FW	(Armenia) ARM	Vahe Movsisyan	5	0	2+3	0	0	0
19	DF	(Ukraine) UKR	Sviatoslav Hrabchak	15	1	14	1	1	0
20	MF	(Iran) IRN	Armin Mir Doraghi	7	0	4+2	0	1	0
21	MF	(Democratic Republic of the Congo) COD	Antonio Lokwa	12	0	10+1	0	1	0
22	DF	(Belarus) BLR	Pavel Demidchik	11	0	7+4	0	0	0
23	MF	(Brazil) BRA	Elias	9	0	8	0	1	0
25	MF	(Senegal) SEN	Pape Demba Dieye	9	0	8+1	0	0	0
27	FW	(Armenia) ARM	Gegham Tumbaryan	7	0	3+4	0	0	0
30	MF	(Ukraine) UKR	Dmytro Klimakov	4	0	3+1	0	0	0
31	FW	(Colombia) COL	Jafett Del Portillo Bolaño	5	0	5	0	0	0
47	MF	(Belarus) BLR	Sergey Lynko	5	0	5	0	0	0
99	GK	(Armenia) ARM	Grigor Makaryan	4	0	4	0	0	0
Players away on loan:
Players who left Yerevan during the season:
7	FW	(Armenia) ARM	Abraham Portugalyan	8	3	5+2	3	1	0
9	FW	(Russia) RUS	Ramazan Isayev	16	6	12+3	6	1	0
15	MF	(Armenia) ARM	Vladimir Babayan	1	0	0+1	0	0	0
33	FW	(Armenia) ARM	Viulen Ayvazyan	7	0	3+4	0	0	0

=== Goal scorers ===
Place	Position	Nation	Number	Name	Premier League	Armenian Cup	Total
1	FW	(Russia)	9	Ramazan Isayev	6	0	6
2	FW	(Armenia)	7	Abraham Portugalyan	3	0	3
3	DF	(Ukraine)	19	Sviatoslav Hrabchak	1	0	1
3	FW	(Brazil)	14	Jeferson Cruz	1	0	1
				TOTALS	11	0	11

=== Disciplinary record ===
Number	Nation	Position	Name	Premier League		Armenian Cup		Total	
Number	Nation	Position	Name	Booked	Sent off (straight red)	Booked	Sent off (straight red)	Booked	Sent off (straight red)
5	(Armenia)	DF	Argishti Petrosyan	2	0	0	0	2	0
6	(Armenia)	MF	Aram Hovsepyan	1	0	0	0	1	0
8	(Russia)	MF	Yvgeny Yevgenyev	4	0	0	0	4	0
14	(Brazil)	FW	Jeferson Cruz	1	0	0	0	1	0
17	(Russia)	MF	Roman Zavialov	1	0	0	0	1	0
20	(Iran)	MF	Armin Mir Doraghi	2	0	0	0	2	0
21	(Democratic Republic of the Congo)	MF	Antonio Lokwa	1	0	0	0	1	0
22	(Belarus)	DF	Pavel Demidchik	3	0	0	0	3	0
23	(Brazil)	MF	Elias	0	1	0	0	0	1
30	(Ukraine)	MF	Dmytro Klimakov	1	0	0	0	1	0
31	(Colombia)	FW	Jafett Del Portillo Bolaño	1	0	0	0	1	0
47	(Belarus)	MF	Sergey Lynko	2	0	0	0	2	0
Players who left Yerevan during the season:
7	(Armenia)	FW	Abraham Portugalyan	1	0	0	0	1	0
9	(Russia)	FW	Ramazan Isayev	1	0	0	0	1	0
			TOTALS	21	1	0	0	21	1
