= List of Armenian football transfers summer 2019 =

This is a list of Armenian football transfers in the summer transfer window, by club. Only clubs of the 2019–20 Armenian Premier League Armenian Premier League are included.

== Armenian Premier League 2019-20 ==
=== Alashkert ===
In: Note: Flags indicate national team as defined under FIFA eligibility rules; some limited exceptions apply. Players may hold more than one non-FIFA nationality.

No.	Pos.	Nation	Player
2	DF	SRB	Aleksandar Miljković (from (Poland) Miedź Legnica)
4	DF	ARM	Gor Poghosyan (from (Armenia) Ararat Yerevan)
5	DF	EST	Nikita Baranov (from (Bulgaria) Beroe Stara Zagora)
6	MF	ARM	Artur Yedigaryan (from (Serbia) Proleter Novi Sad)
7	FW	ARM	Mihran Manasyan (from (Armenia) Gandzasar)
9	FW	BRA	Tiago Galvão (from (Malta) Floriana)
10	MF	BRA	Gustavo Marmentini (from (Brazil) Athletico Paranaense B, previously on loan)
11	MF	ARM	Vahagn Hayrapetyan (from (Armenia) Pyunik)
12	FW	ARM	David Ghandilyan (from (Armenia) Shirak)
13	MF	UKR	Artur Avahimyan (from (Ukraine) Arsenal Kyiv)
14	MF	ARM	Sargis Shahinyan (from (Armenia) Ararat Yerevan)
15	FW	BIH	Aleksandar Glišić (from (Armenia) Urartu)
18	DF	BRA	Tiago Cametá (from (Brazil) Vila Nova)
20	FW	ARM	Vardan Pogosyan (from (Armenia) Urartu)
22	DF	ARM	Hayk Ishkhanyan (from (Armenia) Lori)
24	MF	ARM	Eduard Avagyan (from (Armenia) Pyunik)
31	GK	ARM	Gor Manukyan (from (Armenia) Pyunik)
77	FW	ARM	Gegham Kadymyan (from (Ukraine) Arsenal Kyiv)
—	DF	ARM	Aram Shakhnazaryan (from (Armenia) Shirak)
—	DF	RUS	Kirill Aloyan

Out: Note: Flags indicate national team as defined under FIFA eligibility rules; some limited exceptions apply. Players may hold more than one non-FIFA nationality.

No.	Pos.	Nation	Player
5	DF	SRB	Danijel Stojković (to (Belarus) Neman Grodno)
6	DF	SRB	Goran Antonić (to (Serbia) TSC)
7	DF	ARM	Levon Hayrapetyan
9	MF	CHI	Gerson Acevedo
10	FW	ARM	Edgar Manucharyan (to (Armenia) Pyunik)
13	DF	RUS	Denis Tumasyan (to (Russia) Chayka Peschanokopskoye)
11	MF	ARM	Ghukas Poghosyan
14	FW	BRA	Gláucio
15	FW	SRB	Uroš Nenadović (to (Denmark) AC Horsens)
17	MF	ARM	Artak Yedigaryan (to (Armenia) Pyunik)
17	MF	SRB	Danilo Sekulić (end of loan from to (Hungary) Debreceni)
18	MF	BRA	Jefferson
19	FW	RUS	Aleksandr Prudnikov (to (Belarus) Vitebsk)
20	MF	ARM	Artur Yedigaryan (to (Serbia) Proleter Novi Sad)
20	FW	ARM	Vardan Pogosyan (to (Armenia) Gandzasar Kapan)
22	DF	ARM	Hrayr Mkoyan (to (Armenia) Shirak)
—	DF	ARM	Aram Shakhnazaryan (to (Armenia) Lokomotiv Yerevan)
—	MF	ARM	Artak Dashyan (to (Armenia) Urartu)
—	MF	CIV	Joël Damahou

=== Ararat-Armenia ===
In: Note: Flags indicate national team as defined under FIFA eligibility rules; some limited exceptions apply. Players may hold more than one non-FIFA nationality.

No.	Pos.	Nation	Player
3	DF	POR	Ângelo Meneses (from (Portugal) Famalicão)
17	FW	BFA	Zakaria Sanogo (from (Burkina Faso) Rahimo)
20	DF	MAR	Rochdi Achenteh (from (Netherlands) FC Eindhoven)
27	MF	NED	Furdjel Narsingh (from (Netherlands) De Graafschap)
67	MF	EST	Ilja Antonov (from (Romania) Hermannstadt)

Out: Note: Flags indicate national team as defined under FIFA eligibility rules; some limited exceptions apply. Players may hold more than one non-FIFA nationality.

No.	Pos.	Nation	Player
2	DF	ESP	Sergi (to (Spain) Alavés)
4	MF	RUS	Aleksey Pustozyorov (to (Belarus) Slutsk)
14	FW	BUL	Ivaylo Dimitrov (to (Bulgaria) Arda Kardzhali)
11	MF	ARM	Zhirayr Shaghoyan (loan to (Armenia) BKMA Yerevan)
17	MF	COL	Giovanny Martínez
29	DF	RUS	Vladimir Khozin (loan return to (Russia) Ural Yekaterinburg)
97	FW	RUS	David Davidyan (to (Armenia) Ararat Yerevan)

=== Ararat Yerevan ===
In: Note: Flags indicate national team as defined under FIFA eligibility rules; some limited exceptions apply. Players may hold more than one non-FIFA nationality.

No.	Pos.	Nation	Player
1	GK	RUS	Sergei Revyakin (from (Russia) Ararat Moscow)
3	DF	BRA	João Victor (loan from (Brazil) XV de Novembro)
4	DF	RUS	Arkadi Kalaydzhyan (from (Russia) Sochi)
5	MF	GEO	Zurab Arziani
7	MF	RUS	Aleksandr Kozlov (from (Russia) Ararat Moscow)
8	MF	ARM	Albert Mnatsakanyan
9	FW	RUS	Giorgi Chelidze (from (Belgium) Tubize)
11	MF	RUS	Taymuraz Toboyev (from (Russia) Spartak Vladikavkaz)
15	MF	RUS	Yevgeni Balyaikin
18	MF	RUS	Irakli Logua (from (Russia) Ararat Moscow)
19	DF	ARM	Artak Aleksanyan (from (Russia) Ararat Moscow)
21	FW	ARM	Emmanuel Odemis (from (Switzerland) Forward-Morges)
23	DF	UKR	Ivan Spychka (from (Russia) Ararat Moscow)
24	MF	UKR	Sergey Karetnik (from (Lithuania) Palanga)
27	MF	RUS	David Khurtsidze (from (Russia) Ararat Moscow)
33	FW	RUS	Denis Shevchuk (from (Russia) Ararat Moscow)
34	DF	RUS	Yevgeni Makeyev (from (Russia) Rotor Volgograd)
37	FW	RUS	Dmitri Ryzhov (from (Russia) Akron Tolyatti)
66	DF	RUS	Konstantin Morozov (from (Russia) Ararat Moscow)
69	MF	UKR	Denys Dedechko (from (Ukraine) Oleksandriya)
77	MF	BRA	Vitinho (from (Brazil) Novorizontino)
80	FW	BRA	Gabriel Santos (loan from (Brazil) XV de Novembro)
88	DF	BRA	James (from (Brazil) Campinense)
90	FW	BRA	Welsen Junior (loan from (Brazil) XV de Novembro)
94	FW	ARM	David Arshakyan (from (Croatia) NK Rudeš)
97	FW	RUS	David Davidyan (from Ararat-Armenia)
—	DF	MLI	Drisa Diara (from (Mali) AS Bamako)
—	MF	RUS	Valeri Yaroshenko
—	MF	COL	Joel Cedeño

Out: Note: Flags indicate national team as defined under FIFA eligibility rules; some limited exceptions apply. Players may hold more than one non-FIFA nationality.

No.	Pos.	Nation	Player
3	DF	RUS	Matvey Guyganov
5	DF	ARM	Vardan Arzoyan (to (Armenia) Gandzasar Kapan)
7	DF	ARM	Gor Poghosyan (to (Armenia) Alashkert)
8	MF	AUS	Anthony Trajkoski (to (Australia) Smederevo 1924)
12	GK	ARM	Edvard Hovhannisyan
14	DF	UKR	Mykhaylo Kaluhin (to (Belarus) Dnyapro Mogilev)
15	MF	UKR	Andriy Yakovlyev (to (Lithuania) Palanga)
18	DF	FRA	Aboubacar Gassama
19	FW	ARM	Sargis Metoyan
20	DF	ARM	Rafael Safaryan (Retired)
21	FW	ARM	Andranik Kocharyan (to (Armenia) Gandzasar Kapan)
23	MF	SRB	Dejan Vukomanović
—	GK	ALG	Hossin Lagoun (loan return to (Sweden) AFC Eskilstuna)
—	DF	ARM	Vahe Chopuryan
—	DF	ARM	Hayk Sargsyan
—	DF	BEL	Kevin Ntika
—	DF	RUS	Magomed Abidinov (to (Russia) Legion Dynamo Makhachkala)
—	MF	ARM	Sargis Shahinyan (to (Armenia) Alashkert)
—	MF	ARM	Artem Simonyan (to (Armenia) Pyunik)
—	MF	KOR	Sim Woon-sub
—	MF	RUS	Valeri Yaroshenko (to (Russia) Ararat Moscow)
—	MF	RUS	Rostislav Golovach
—	MF	SEN	Pape Demba Dieye (to (Armenia) Yerevan)
—	MF	SEN	Ebot Derrick Ayuk Oru
—	MF	RSA	Mpumelelo Zwane
—	FW	ARM	Mikayel Arustamyan
—	FW	ARM	Orbeli Hambardzumyan (to (Kyrgyzstan) Alay Osh)

=== Gandzasar Kapan ===
In: Note: Flags indicate national team as defined under FIFA eligibility rules; some limited exceptions apply. Players may hold more than one non-FIFA nationality.

No.	Pos.	Nation	Player
2	DF	ARM	Hakob Hambardzumyan (from (Armenia) Urartu)
4	DF	ARM	Gagik Maghakyan (from (Armenia) Urartu)
7	FW	ARM	Vardan Pogosyan (from (Armenia) Alashkert)
11	FW	ARM	Gegham Tumbaryan (from (Armenia) Lokomotiv Yerevan)
14	MF	ARM	Emil Yeghiazaryan (from (Armenia) Noah)
15	DF	GHA	Annan Mensah (loan from (Armenia) Lori)
20	MF	ARM	Artur Grigoryan (from (Armenia) Noah)
27	MF	BFA	Abdoul Zoko (from (Ethiopia) Saint George)
55	DF	ARM	Vardan Arzoyan (from (Armenia) Ararat Yerevan)
94	FW	ARM	Andranik Kocharyan (from (Armenia) Ararat Yerevan)
99	FW	CIV	Stephane Adjuman (from (Armenia) Lori)

Out: Note: Flags indicate national team as defined under FIFA eligibility rules; some limited exceptions apply. Players may hold more than one non-FIFA nationality.

No.	Pos.	Nation	Player
11	FW	ARM	Gegham Tumbaryan (to (Armenia) Yerevan)
13	DF	PER	Alex Magallanes (to (Peru) Sport Loreto)
17	DF	ARM	Ashot Karapetyan (to (Armenia) Sevan)
20	MF	ARM	Artur Yuspashyan
24	DF	GNB	Bacar Baldé
29	FW	ARM	Mihran Manasyan (to (Armenia) Alashkert)
30	FW	ZIM	Clive Rupiya
38	MF	POR	Jorge Chula (to (Portugal) Pedras Salgadas)

=== Lori ===
In: Note: Flags indicate national team as defined under FIFA eligibility rules; some limited exceptions apply. Players may hold more than one non-FIFA nationality.

No.	Pos.	Nation	Player
1	GK	POL	Danny El-Hage (from (Sweden) Härnösands)
3	DF	ESP	Pedro Morilio (from (Spain) CD Alcalá)
4	DF	BRA	Louise Matheus (from (Brazil) Batatais)
7	FW	ARM	Robert Minasyan (from (Armenia) Pyunik)
9	FW	ARM	Grigor Aghekyan (from (Belarus) Isloch)
11	MF	ESP	Alejandro Puertas (from (Spain) Córdoba B)
13	GK	ARM	Vardan Shapperi (from (Armenia) Pyunik)
14	MF	GEO	Levan Macharashvili (from (Lithuania) Stumbras)
15	DF	HAI	Djimy Alexis (from (Haiti) AS Capoise)
16	FW	ESP	Xabi Auzmendi (from (Spain) Real Sociedad C)
20	MF	COL	Julian Mendoza (from (Colombia) Real Cartagena)
20	MF	MLI	Moussa Diakité (from (Romania) Botoșani)
21	DF	ARM	Artur Avagyan (from (Armenia) Urartu)
22	DF	BRA	William Gustavo (from (Estonia) Nõmme Kalju)
23	MF	ARM	Davit Paremuzyan (loan from (Armenia) Urartu II)
24	MF	CIV	Alexandre Yeoule (from (Tunisia) Tataouine)
27	DF	ESP	Christian Jiménez (from (Spain) CD Alcalá)
28	MF	RUS	Ruslan Zayerko (from (Belarus) Lida)
29	FW	CIV	Anicet Oura (from (Ivory Coast) Africa Sports d'Abidjan)
31	GK	BRA	Bruno Santos (from (Portugal) Limianos)
44	DF	COL	Juan Bravo (from (Argentina) Sportivo Barracas)
97	FW	HAI	Jonel Désiré (from (Haiti) AS Mirebalais, previously on loan)

Out: Note: Flags indicate national team as defined under FIFA eligibility rules; some limited exceptions apply. Players may hold more than one non-FIFA nationality.

No.	Pos.	Nation	Player
2	DF	GHA	Nana Antwi (loan to (France) Lille)
3	DF	UGA	Alex Kakuba (to (Portugal) Cova da Piedade)
4	DF	ARM	Murad Asatryan (to (Armenia) Aragats)
6	MF	GHA	Annan Mensah (loan to (Armenia) Gandzasar Kapan)
7	MF	ARM	Vladimir Babayan (to (Armenia) Yerevan)
10	MF	NGA	Isah Aliyu (to (Spain) UD Almería)
11	FW	MDA	Alexandru Osipov
12	GK	ARM	Samvel Hunanyan (to (Armenia) Aragats)
14	MF	NGA	Udoh Etop (to (Tunisia) JS Kairouan)
15	DF	NGA	Deou Dosa
16	DF	NGA	Ekereuke Ekemini
17	MF	NGA	Uguchukwu Iwu (loan to (Armenia) Pyunik)
20	MF	NGA	Ubong Friday
21	FW	NGA	Francis Nwankwo (to (Armenia) Sevan)
22	DF	ARM	Hayk Ishkhanyan (to (Armenia) Alashkert)
22	DF	BRA	William Gustavo (to (Armenia) Yerevan)
27	FW	CIV	Stephane Adjuman (to (Armenia) Gandzasar Kapan)
30	MF	GHA	Ibrahim Fuseini
33	GK	UKR	Danylo Ryabenko (to (Tajikistan) CSKA Pamir Dushanbe)
77	GK	RUS	Arsen Siukayev (to (Russia) Tom Tomsk)

=== Noah ===
In: Note: Flags indicate national team as defined under FIFA eligibility rules; some limited exceptions apply. Players may hold more than one non-FIFA nationality.

No.	Pos.	Nation	Player
2	DF	RUS	Vitali Zaprudskikh (from (Russia) Zorky Krasnogorsk)
5	DF	RUS	Vladislav Kryuchkov (from (Russia) Baltika Kaliningrad)
6	DF	RUS	Soslan Kagermazov (from (Russia) Fakel Voronezh)
9	DF	RUS	Vladimir Azarov (from (Russia) Sibir Novosibirsk)
14	DF	RUS	Mikhail Kovalenko (from (Russia) Tyumen)
15	FW	RUS	Maksim Mayrovich (from (Russia) KAMAZ)
20	MF	ARM	Edgar Grigoryan (loan from (Armenia) Urartu)
21	MF	ARM	David Manoyan (from (North Macedonia) Rabotnički)
27	MF	RUS	Aleksei Turik (from (Russia) Zenit-Izhevsk)
31	FW	RUS	Dmitri Lavrishchev (from (Russia) Rotor Volgograd)
37	GK	RUS	Maksim Shvagirev (from (Russia) Ararat Moscow)
57	MF	RUS	Pavel Deobald (from (Russia) Shinnik Yaroslavl)
77	GK	ITA	Valerio Vimercati (from (Portugal) Leiria)
88	MF	RUS	Sergey Mikhaylov (from (Russia) Rotor Volgograd)
97	MF	RUS	Kirill Bor (from (Russia) Ararat Moscow)

Out: Note: Flags indicate national team as defined under FIFA eligibility rules; some limited exceptions apply. Players may hold more than one non-FIFA nationality.

No.	Pos.	Nation	Player
1	GK	RUS	Samur Agamagomedov (to (Armenia) Van Yerevan)
5	MF	CIV	Geo Danny Ekra
6	DF	ARM	Argishti Petrosyan (to (Armenia) Yerevan)
10	MF	ARM	Artur Grigoryan (to (Armenia) Gandzasar Kapan)
11	MF	ARM	Eduard Avagyan (to (Armenia) Pyunik)
14	MF	ARM	Emil Yeghiazaryan (to (Armenia) Gandzasar Kapan)
18	MF	UKR	Dmytro Klimakov (to (Armenia) Yerevan)
19	DF	ARM	Vahagn Minasyan
20	FW	ARM	Vigen Avetisyan
28	FW	CIV	Wilfried Eza (to (Armenia) Van Yerevan)
88	FW	ARM	Vardan Bakalyan
—	GK	ARM	Ashot Ayvazyan (to (Armenia) Van Yerevan)
—	GK	RUS	Aleksei Solosin
—	FW	BFA	Abdoul Gafar Sirima (to (Russia) Armavir)

=== Pyunik ===
In: Note: Flags indicate national team as defined under FIFA eligibility rules; some limited exceptions apply. Players may hold more than one non-FIFA nationality.

No.	Pos.	Nation	Player
4	DF	RUS	Anton Belov (from (Russia) Anzhi Makhachkala)
7	MF	ARM	Artem Simonyan (from (Armenia) Ararat Yerevan)
8	DF	MKD	Antonio Stankov (from (Netherlands) Dordrecht)
11	FW	ARM	Edgar Manucharyan (from (Armenia) Alashkert)
13	MF	RUS	Stanislav Yefimov (from (Armenia) Yerevan)
17	MF	ARM	Artak Yedigaryan (from (Armenia) Alashkert)
19	FW	RUS	Dmitri Sychev
20	MF	NGA	Uguchukwu Iwu (loan from (Armenia) Lori)
23	MF	ARM	Aras Özbiliz (from (Turkey) Beşiktaş)
24	DF	RWA	Salomon Nirisarike (from (Belgium) Tubize)
42	FW	NGA	Steven Alfred (from (Russia) Sochi)
65	MF	RUS	Aleksandr Galimov (from (Russia) Ural Yekaterinburg)
70	MF	UKR	Serhiy Shevchuk (from (Russia) Tambov, previously on loan)
77	FW	MKD	Denis Mahmudov (from (Netherlands) Excelsior)
96	MF	ARM	Eduard Avagyan (from (Armenia) Noah)
98	MF	MNE	Marko Burzanović (from (Croatia) Inter Zaprešić)

Out: Note: Flags indicate national team as defined under FIFA eligibility rules; some limited exceptions apply. Players may hold more than one non-FIFA nationality.

No.	Pos.	Nation	Player
1	GK	ARM	Gor Manukyan (from (Armenia) Alashkert)
8	MF	ARM	Rumyan Hovsepyan (to (Bulgaria) Arda Kardzhali)
11	FW	CIV	Mohamed Konaté (to (Russia) Tambov)
12	GK	ARM	Sevak Aslanyan
13	FW	RUS	Denis Dorozhkin (to (Russia) Novosibirsk)
15	MF	UKR	Maksym Trusevych
19	MF	RUS	Denis Talalay (to (Russia) Tom Tomsk)
23	MF	NGA	Mohammed Usman (to (Russia) Tambov)
27	DF	RUS	Vyacheslav Dmitriyev (to (Russia) Ararat Moscow)
30	MF	ARM	Vahagn Hayrapetyan (to (Armenia) Alashkert)
33	FW	CIV	Lassina Dao
67	DF	RUS	Sergei Kolychev
96	MF	ARM	Eduard Avagyan (from (Armenia) Alashkert)
—	GK	ARM	Vardan Shapperi (to (Armenia) Lori)
—	DF	MLI	Daouda Toure (to (United Arab Emirates) Al Dhafra)

=== Shirak ===
In: Note: Flags indicate national team as defined under FIFA eligibility rules; some limited exceptions apply. Players may hold more than one non-FIFA nationality.

No.	Pos.	Nation	Player
10	MF	ARM	Edgar Malakyan (from (Romania) Petrolul Ploiești)
11	MF	NGA	Solomon Udo (from (Armenia) Urartu)
22	DF	ARM	Hrayr Mkoyan (from (Armenia) Alashkert)
23	DF	SRB	Bogdan Miličić (from (Serbia) Zlatibor Čajetina)
98	FW	CIV	Mory Kone (from (Latvia) BFC Daugavpils)

Out: Note: Flags indicate national team as defined under FIFA eligibility rules; some limited exceptions apply. Players may hold more than one non-FIFA nationality.

No.	Pos.	Nation	Player
3	DF	ARM	Aram Shakhnazaryan (to (Armenia) Alashkert)
10	MF	ARM	Khoren Veranyan (to (Armenia) Torpedo Yerevan)
11	MF	ARM	David Ghandilyan (to (Armenia) Alashkert)
21	DF	ARM	Mher Safaryan
22	FW	MKD	Bunjamin Shabani (to (Kosovo) Drita)
41	MF	MKD	Fatjon Jusufi (to (North Macedonia) Shkupi)

=== Urartu ===
In: Note: Flags indicate national team as defined under FIFA eligibility rules; some limited exceptions apply. Players may hold more than one non-FIFA nationality.

No.	Pos.	Nation	Player
8	DF	SRB	Miloš Nikolić (from (Serbia) Zvijezda 09)
11	MF	ARM	Artak Dashyan (from (Armenia) Alashkert)
18	FW	VEN	Juan Carlos Azócar (from (Venezuela) Deportivo La Guaira)
19	MF	COD	Peter Mutumosi
21	MF	CRO	Jurica Grgec (from (Israel) Hapoel Afula)
25	DF	VEN	Rubén Ramírez (from Atlético Venezuela)
90	FW	UKR	Yevhen Budnik (from (Estonia) FCI Levadia)
91	MF	CRO	Marco Brtan (from (Bosnia and Herzegovina) Krupa)
93	FW	RUS	Semyon Sinyavsky (from (Russia) Armavir)

Out: Note: Flags indicate national team as defined under FIFA eligibility rules; some limited exceptions apply. Players may hold more than one non-FIFA nationality.

No.	Pos.	Nation	Player
3	DF	RUS	Albert Gadzhibekov (loan return to (Russia) Armavir)
6	DF	SRB	Borislav Jovanović
8	FW	ARM	Vardan Pogosyan (to (Armenia) Alashkert)
11	FW	GHA	Nathaniel Asamoah
17	FW	MDA	Ilie Damașcan (to (Moldova) Petrocub Hîncești)
18	DF	ARM	Vahagn Ayvazyan (to (Oman) Al-Nasr)
21	DF	ARM	Artur Avagyan (to (Armenia) Lori)
22	GK	ARM	Stepan Ghazaryan (Retired)
25	MF	NGA	Solomon Udo (to (Armenia) Shirak)
78	FW	BIH	Aleksandar Glišić (from (Armenia) Alashkert)
—	DF	ARM	Hakob Hambardzumyan (to (Armenia) Gandzasar Kapan)
—	DF	ARM	Gagik Maghakyan (to (Armenia) Gandzasar Kapan)
—	MF	ARM	Davit Paremuzyan (loan to (Armenia) Lori)
—	MF	ARM	Edgar Grigoryan (loan to (Armenia) Noah)
—	MF	BEL	Welat Cagro

=== Yerevan ===
In: Note: Flags indicate national team as defined under FIFA eligibility rules; some limited exceptions apply. Players may hold more than one non-FIFA nationality.

No.	Pos.	Nation	Player
2	DF	BRA	William Gustavo (from (Armenia) Lori)
3	DF	ARM	Aghavard Petrosyan (from (Armenia) Lokomotiv Yerevan)
4	DF	RUS	Maksim Evstigneev
5	DF	ARM	Argishti Petrosyan (from (Armenia) Noah)
6	MF	ARM	Aram Hovsepyan (from (Armenia) Sevan)
9	FW	RUS	Ramazan Isayev
11	MF	ARM	Levon Badalyan (from (Armenia) Pyunik)
14	FW	BRA	Jeferson Cruz
15	MF	ARM	Vladimir Babayan (from (Armenia) Lori)
20	MF	IRN	Armin Mir Doraghi
22	DF	BLR	Pavel Demidchik (from (Belarus) Smorgon)
23	MF	BRA	Elias (from (Bulgaria) Haskovo)
25	MF	SEN	Pape Demba Dieye (from (Armenia) Ararat Yerevan)
27	FW	ARM	Gegham Tumbaryan (from (Armenia) Gandzasar Kapan)
30	MF	UKR	Dmytro Klimakov (from (Armenia) Noah)
31	FW	COL	Jafett Del Portillo Bolaño (from (Nicaragua) ART Municipal Jalapa)
33	FW	ARM	Viulen Ayvazyan
47	MF	BLR	Sergey Lynko (from (Belarus) Torpedo Minsk)

Out: Note: Flags indicate national team as defined under FIFA eligibility rules; some limited exceptions apply. Players may hold more than one non-FIFA nationality.

No.	Pos.	Nation	Player
—	GK	ARM	Hovhannes Navasardyan
—	DF	ARM	Norayr Artemyan
—	DF	ARM	Khachik Keheyan
—	DF	ARM	Artur Meliksetyan
—	DF	ARM	Gor Mkrtumyan
—	DF	ARM	Rafik Poghosyan
—	DF	ARM	Khachatur Topalyan
—	DF	COD	Michel Otolorin Falola
—	DF	UKR	Roman Pomazan
—	MF	ARM	Vladimir Babayan (to West Armenia)
—	MF	ARM	Samvel Khachikyan
—	MF	CIV	Koubi Fabrice Mondesir
—	MF	RUS	Stanislav Yefimov (to (Armenia) Pyunik)
—	FW	COD	Aristote Va Shibang (to (Armenia) Van)
—	FW	GEO	Irakli Penderava (to (Armenia) Lokomotiv Yerevan)
—	FW	RUS	Ivan Latyshev
—	FW	RUS	Sergey Timofeev (Retired)
