= List of Armenian football transfers winter 2019–20 =

This is a list of Armenian football transfers in the winter transfer window, by club. Only clubs of the 2019–20 Armenian Premier League Armenian Premier League are included.

== Armenian Premier League 2019-20 ==
=== Alashkert ===
In: Note: Flags indicate national team as defined under FIFA eligibility rules; some limited exceptions apply. Players may hold more than one non-FIFA nationality.

No.	Pos.	Nation	Player
6	MF	SEN	Pape Abdou Camara (from (Armenia) Urartu)
7	MF	NAM	Wangu Gome (from (South Africa) Cape Umoya United)
12	FW	NGA	Sunday Ingbede (loan from (Armenia) Lori)
14	DF	MKD	Risto Mitrevski (from (Cyprus) Enosis Neon Paralimni)
20	DF	BRA	Bryan (from (Brazil) CRB)
22	DF	ARM	Hayk Ishkhanyan (from (Kazakhstan) Zhetysu)
23	FW	RUS	David Gatikoyev (from (Russia) Spartak Vladikavkaz)
77	FW	ARM	Edgar Manucharyan (from (Armenia) Pyunik)
—	DF	MDA	Victor Mudrac (from (Moldova) Petrocub Hîncești)

Out: Note: Flags indicate national team as defined under FIFA eligibility rules; some limited exceptions apply. Players may hold more than one non-FIFA nationality.

No.	Pos.	Nation	Player
4	DF	SRB	Mladen Zeljković (to (Bosnia and Herzegovina) Čelik Zenica)
6	MF	ARM	Artur Yedigaryan (Retired)
7	FW	ARM	Mihran Manasyan (to (Armenia) Lori)
12	FW	ARM	David Ghandilyan (to (Armenia) Lori)
13	MF	UKR	Artur Avahimyan (to (Ukraine) Chornomorets Odesa)
14	MF	ARM	Sargis Shahinyan (to (Armenia) Lori)
17	MF	ARM	Ghukas Poghosyan (to (Armenia) Van)
22	DF	ARM	Hayk Ishkhanyan (to (Kazakhstan) Zhetysu)
23	DF	RUS	Kirill Aloyan (to (Russia) Yenisey Krasnoyarsk)
77	FW	ARM	Gegham Kadymyan (to (Belarus) Neman Grodno)
—	FW	ARM	Akhmed Jindoyan

=== Ararat-Armenia ===
In: Note: Flags indicate national team as defined under FIFA eligibility rules; some limited exceptions apply. Players may hold more than one non-FIFA nationality.

No.	Pos.	Nation	Player
9	MF	FRA	Yoan Gouffran
24	FW	NGA	Yusuf Otubanjo (from (Austria) LASK)
79	MF	UKR	Serhiy Vakulenko (from (Ukraine) Karpaty Lviv)
—	FW	ARM	Marcos Pizzelli (from (Kazakhstan) Aktobe)

Out: Note: Flags indicate national team as defined under FIFA eligibility rules; some limited exceptions apply. Players may hold more than one non-FIFA nationality.

No.	Pos.	Nation	Player
6	DF	BUL	Georgi Pashov (to (Kazakhstan) Zhetysu)
77	MF	ARM	Petros Avetisyan (to (Kazakhstan) Tobol)
—	MF	ARM	Erik Azizyan (to (Armenia) Pyunik)
—	FW	ARM	Marcos Pizzelli (Retired)

=== Ararat Yerevan ===
In: Note: Flags indicate national team as defined under FIFA eligibility rules; some limited exceptions apply. Players may hold more than one non-FIFA nationality.

No.	Pos.	Nation	Player
11	FW	RUS	Ramazan Isayev (from (Armenia) Yerevan)
17	FW	POR	Sancidino Silva (from (Switzerland) Lausanne-Sport)
32	MF	UKR	Pavlo Stepanets (from (Russia) Luch Vladivostok)
45	DF	GLP	Thomas Phibel (from (Lithuania) Palanga)
70	MF	NGA	Lukman Haruna (from (Tunisia) US Tataouine)
—	GK	RUS	Yevgeni Kobozev (from (Armenia) Pyunik)
—	DF	BRA	Rafinha (from (Brazil) Associação)
—	DF	BRA	Sidney (loan from (Ukraine) Rukh Lviv)
—	FW	NGA	Ganiyu Oseni (from (Vietnam) Hanoi)

Out: Note: Flags indicate national team as defined under FIFA eligibility rules; some limited exceptions apply. Players may hold more than one non-FIFA nationality.

No.	Pos.	Nation	Player
11	MF	RUS	Taymuraz Toboyev (to (Armenia) Urartu)
15	FW	RUS	Yevgeni Balyaikin (to (Armenia) Masis)
19	DF	ARM	Artak Aleksanyan
22	GK	RUS	Mikhail Petrushchenkov
24	FW	UKR	Sergey Karetnik (to (Russia) Yenisey Krasnoyarsk)
33	FW	RUS	Denis Shevchuk

=== Gandzasar Kapan ===
In: Note: Flags indicate national team as defined under FIFA eligibility rules; some limited exceptions apply. Players may hold more than one non-FIFA nationality.

No.	Pos.	Nation	Player
13	GK	ARM	Arman Meliksetyan (from (Armenia) Noah)
17	FW	ARM	Grigor Aghekyan (from (Armenia) Lori)
65	MF	BRA	Juninho (from (Portugal) Águeda)

Out: Note: Flags indicate national team as defined under FIFA eligibility rules; some limited exceptions apply. Players may hold more than one non-FIFA nationality.

No.	Pos.	Nation	Player
4	DF	ARM	Gagik Maghakyan (to (Armenia) Sevan)
10	MF	ARM	Gevorg Ohanyan
18	DF	ARM	Arman Hovhannisyan (to (Kazakhstan) Tobol)
21	MF	ARM	Martin Grigoryan
28	DF	ARM	Alexander Hovhannisyan
55	DF	ARM	Vardan Arzoyan (to (Armenia) Shirak)
99	FW	CIV	Stephane Adjuman

=== Lori ===
In: Note: Flags indicate national team as defined under FIFA eligibility rules; some limited exceptions apply. Players may hold more than one non-FIFA nationality.

No.	Pos.	Nation	Player
1	GK	POR	Mickaël Meira (from (Romania) Gloria Buzău)
8	MF	ARM	Sargis Shahinyan (from (Armenia) Alashkert)
9	FW	ARG	Agustín Maziero (from (Argentina) Rosario Central)
11	FW	ARM	David Ghandilyan (from (Armenia) Alashkert)
14	FW	ESP	Yeray Moreno Jiménez (from (Spain) Xerez)
17	DF	URU	Gianni Rodríguez
18	DF	ARM	Vahagn Ayvazyan (from (Oman) Al-Nasr)
19	DF	AUT	Tode Đaković (from (Serbia) Smederevo 1924)
31	GK	ESP	Diego Barrios (from (Spain) Real Valladolid B)
—	FW	ARM	Mihran Manasyan (from (Armenia) Alashkert)

Out: Note: Flags indicate national team as defined under FIFA eligibility rules; some limited exceptions apply. Players may hold more than one non-FIFA nationality.

No.	Pos.	Nation	Player
1	GK	POL	Danny El-Hage (to (Iceland) Leiknir F.)
3	DF	ESP	Pedro Juan Agillar Morilio
6	MF	COL	Julian Mendoza
8	MF	ARM	Aram Kocharyan (to (Armenia) Gandzasar Kapan)
9	FW	ARM	Grigor Aghekyan (to (Armenia) Gandzasar Kapan)
11	MF	ESP	Alejandro Puertas
14	MF	GEO	Levan Macharashvili (to (Georgia (country)) Saburtalo Tbilisi)
18	DF	ARM	Artyom Khachaturov (to (Moldova) Florești)
19	FW	NGA	Nwani Ikechukwu (loan return to (Nigeria) Nasarawa United)
20	MF	MLI	Moussa Diakité (to (Mali) Djoliba)
26	FW	NGA	Sunday Ingbede (loan to (Armenia) Alashkert)
29	FW	CIV	Anicet Oura (to (Armenia) Masis)
30	FW	GHA	Darko Enock (loan to (Armenia) Sevan)
31	GK	BRA	Bruno Santos

=== Noah ===
In: Note: Flags indicate national team as defined under FIFA eligibility rules; some limited exceptions apply. Players may hold more than one non-FIFA nationality.

No.	Pos.	Nation	Player
7	MF	LVA	Eduards Emsis (from (Latvia) Jelgava)
16	MF	GNB	Helistano Manga (from (Portugal) União de Leiria)
21	FW	LTU	Rokas Krusnauskas (from (Lithuania) Kauno Žalgiris)
28	GK	ARM	Artem Delinyan (from (Russia) Khimki)
94	MF	MDA	Dan Spătaru (from (Latvia) Liepāja)
—	MF	ARM	Seyran Malkhasyan (from (Russia) Lokomotiv Moscow Academy)

Out: Note: Flags indicate national team as defined under FIFA eligibility rules; some limited exceptions apply. Players may hold more than one non-FIFA nationality.

No.	Pos.	Nation	Player
12	GK	ARM	Arman Meliksetyan (to (Armenia) Gandzasar Kapan)
17	FW	ARM	Edgar Movsesyan (to (Armenia) Van)
21	MF	ARM	David Manoyan (to (Armenia) Shirak)
23	DF	ARM	Artur Stepanyan (loan to (Armenia) Van)
27	MF	RUS	Aleksei Turik
88	MF	RUS	Sergey Mikhaylov

=== Pyunik ===
In: Note: Flags indicate national team as defined under FIFA eligibility rules; some limited exceptions apply. Players may hold more than one non-FIFA nationality.

No.	Pos.	Nation	Player
13	MF	ARM	Erik Azizyan (from Ararat-Armenia II)
31	GK	RUS	Vladimir Sugrobov (loan from (Russia) Tambov)
65	MF	RUS	Dmitri Malyaka (from (Belarus) Gomel)
66	DF	RUS	Maksim Zhestokov (from (Armenia) Pyunik)
96	MF	NGA	Joseph Adah (from (Belarus) Slutsk)
—	DF	COD	Guy Magema (from (Armenia) Urartu)

Out: Note: Flags indicate national team as defined under FIFA eligibility rules; some limited exceptions apply. Players may hold more than one non-FIFA nationality.

No.	Pos.	Nation	Player
10	MF	ARM	Erik Vardanyan (to (Russia) Sochi)
11	FW	ARM	Edgar Manucharyan (to (Armenia) Alashkert)
13	MF	RUS	Stanislav Yefimov (to (Armenia) Van)
19	FW	RUS	Dmitri Sychev (Retired)
26	MF	ARM	Hovhannes Ilangyozyan (to (Armenia) Van)
31	GK	RUS	Yevgeni Kobozev (to (Armenia) Ararat Yerevan)
65	MF	RUS	Aleksandr Galimov (loan return to (Russia) Ural Yekaterinburg)
71	MF	ARM	Hovhannes Poghosyan
98	MF	MNE	Marko Burzanović (to (Montenegro) OFK Grbalj)

=== Shirak ===
In: Note: Flags indicate national team as defined under FIFA eligibility rules; some limited exceptions apply. Players may hold more than one non-FIFA nationality.

No.	Pos.	Nation	Player
70	FW	SRB	Uroš Nenadović (from (Denmark) AC Horsens)
77	MF	ARM	David Manoyan (from (Armenia) Noah)
95	DF	ARM	Vardan Arzoyan (from (Armenia) Gandzasar Kapan)
99	DF	CIV	Junior Avo Leibe

Out: Note: Flags indicate national team as defined under FIFA eligibility rules; some limited exceptions apply. Players may hold more than one non-FIFA nationality.

No.	Pos.	Nation	Player
88	MF	CIV	Moussa Bakayoko (to (Republic of Ireland) Derry City)

=== Urartu ===
In: Note: Flags indicate national team as defined under FIFA eligibility rules; some limited exceptions apply. Players may hold more than one non-FIFA nationality.

No.	Pos.	Nation	Player
6	DF	BRA	Ebert (from (Bulgaria) Botev Plovdiv)
17	MF	RUS	Taymuraz Toboyev (from (Armenia) Ararat Yerevan)
19	DF	RUS	Yevgeni Osipov (from (Estonia) Levadia Tallinn)
24	GK	ARM	Arsen Beglaryan (from (Belarus) Dnyapro Mogilev)
26	MF	ALG	Redа Bellahcene (from (Algeria) MC Alger)
78	FW	RUS	Igor Paderin (from (Russia) Armavir)

Out: Note: Flags indicate national team as defined under FIFA eligibility rules; some limited exceptions apply. Players may hold more than one non-FIFA nationality.

No.	Pos.	Nation	Player
4	DF	ARM	Andranik Voskanyan (to (Armenia) Van)
6	DF	COD	Guy Magema (to (Armenia) Pyunik)
11	MF	ARM	Artak Dashyan (to (Kazakhstan) Atyrau)
14	MF	NGA	Adamu Abdullahi
16	MF	SEN	Pape Abdou Camara (to (Armenia) Alashkert)
20	MF	SRB	Igor Stanojević (to (Serbia) Mačva Šabac)
55	DF	SRB	Miloš Nikolić
77	GK	ARM	Aram Ayrapetyan (to (Iran) Paykan)
90	FW	UKR	Yevhen Budnik (to (Indonesia) Persita Tangerang)

=== Yerevan ===
In: Note: Flags indicate national team as defined under FIFA eligibility rules; some limited exceptions apply. Players may hold more than one non-FIFA nationality.

No.	Pos.	Nation	Player

Out: Note: Flags indicate national team as defined under FIFA eligibility rules; some limited exceptions apply. Players may hold more than one non-FIFA nationality.

No.	Pos.	Nation	Player
1	GK	LVA	Jānis Krūmiņš
2	DF	BRA	William Gustavo
3	DF	ARM	Aghavard Petrosyan
4	DF	RUS	Maksim Evstigneev
5	DF	ARM	Argishti Petrosyan (to (Armenia) Van)
6	MF	ARM	Aram Hovsepyan
8	MF	RUS	Yvgeny Yevgenyev
9	FW	RUS	Ramazan Isayev (to (Armenia) Ararat Yerevan)
10	FW	ARM	Edgar Mkrtchyan (to (Armenia) Dilijan)
11	MF	ARM	Levon Badalyan (to (Armenia) Ararat Yerevan II)
12	DF	RUS	Denis Lyubimov
14	FW	BRA	Jeferson Cruz
17	MF	ARM	Roman Zavialov
18	FW	ARM	Vahe Movsisyan
19	DF	UKR	Sviatoslav Hrabchak
20	MF	IRN	Armin Mir Doraghi
21	MF	COD	Antonio Lokwa (to West Armenia)
22	DF	BLR	Pavel Demidchik (to (Belarus) Oshmyany)
23	MF	BRA	Elias
25	MF	SEN	Pape Demba Dieye (to West Armenia)
27	FW	ARM	Gegham Tumbaryan
30	MF	UKR	Dmytro Klimakov (to (Armenia) Masis)
31	FW	COL	Jafett Del Portillo Bolaño
47	MF	BLR	Sergey Lynko (to (Belarus) Krumkachy Minsk)
99	GK	ARM	Grigor Makaryan
