= 2019–20 in Armenian football =

Football in Armenia
- Season: 2019–20

Men's football
- Premier League: Ararat-Armenia
- First League: Van
- Cup: Noah
- Supercup: Ararat-Armenia

The following article is a summary of the 2019–20 football season in Armenia, which is the 28th season of competitive football in the country and runs from August 2019 to July 2020.

== League tables ==
=== Armenian Premier League ===
Pos	Team	Pld	W	D	L	GF	GA	GD	Pts	Qualification
1	Ararat-Armenia	18	11	3	4	33	15	+18	36	Qualification for the Championship round
2	Lori	18	9	5	4	27	19	+8	32	Qualification for the Championship round
3	Alashkert	18	9	4	5	33	20	+13	31	Qualification for the Championship round
4	Ararat	18	9	4	5	25	18	+7	31	Qualification for the Championship round
5	Noah	18	9	3	6	25	19	+6	30	Qualification for the Championship round
6	Shirak	18	8	4	6	25	18	+7	28	Qualification for the Championship round
7	Pyunik	18	7	2	9	35	36	−1	23	Qualification for the Relegation round
8	Urartu	18	6	5	7	22	24	−2	23	Qualification for the Relegation round
9	Gandzasar	18	4	6	8	20	25	−5	18	Qualification for the Relegation round
10	Yerevan (R, D)	18	0	0	18	11	62	−51	0	Withdrawn

Source: Soccerway
Rules for classification: 1) Points; 2) Play-off (only if deciding champion); 3) Matches won; 4) Head-to-head points; 5) Head-to-head matches won; 6) Head-to-head goal difference; 7) Head-to-head goals scored; 8) Head-to-head away goals scored; 9) Goal difference; 10) Goals scored.
(D) Disqualified; (R) Relegated

==== Championship round ====
Pos	Team	Pld	W	D	L	GF	GA	GD	Pts	Qualification
1	Ararat-Armenia (C)	28	15	7	6	45	23	+22	52	Qualification for the Champions League first qualifying round
2	Noah	28	14	6	8	37	27	+10	48	Qualification for the Europa League first qualifying round (Note: team qualified for the Europa League first qualifying round by winning the 2019–20 Armenian Cup.)
3	Alashkert	28	14	5	9	51	31	+20	47	Qualification for the Europa League first qualifying round
4	Shirak	28	13	7	8	40	30	+10	46	Qualification for the Europa League first qualifying round
5	Lori	27	10	10	7	35	33	+2	40	(Note: Match between Lori and Ararat Yerevan was cancelled on 10 July, with no points being awarded.)
6	Ararat	27	9	6	12	31	36	−5	33	(Note: Match between Lori and Ararat Yerevan was cancelled on 10 July, with no points being awarded.)

Source: Soccerway
Rules for classification: 1) Points; 2) Play-off (only if deciding champion); 3) Matches won; 4) Head-to-head points; 5) Head-to-head matches won; 6) Head-to-head goal difference; 7) Head-to-head goals scored; 8) Head-to-head away goals scored; 9) Goal difference; 10) Goals scored.
(C) Champions

==== Relegation round ====
Pos	Team	Pld	W	D	L	GF	GA	GD	Pts
1	Urartu	22	8	6	8	26	27	−1	30
2	Pyunik	22	8	2	12	39	42	−3	26
3	Gandzasar	22	6	7	9	25	29	−4	25

Source: Soccerway
Rules for classification: 1) Points; 2) Play-off (only if deciding champion); 3) Matches won; 4) Head-to-head points; 5) Head-to-head matches won; 6) Head-to-head goal difference; 7) Head-to-head goals scored; 8) Head-to-head away goals scored; 9) Goal difference; 10) Goals scored.

=== Armenian First League ===
Pos	Team	Pld	W	D	L	GF	GA	GD	Pts	Promotion
1	Van (C, P)	28	22	4	2	90	18	+72	70 (Note: Head-to-head points: Van 4, Lokomotiv Yerevan 1.)	Promotion to the Armenian Premier League
2	Lokomotiv Yerevan (D, R)	27	22	4	1	76	23	+53	70	Suspended after the season
3	West Armenia	27	21	3	3	80	37	+43	66	
4	BKMA	27	16	2	9	63	35	+28	50	
5	Ararat-Armenia-2	27	15	3	9	75	47	+28	48	
6	Alashkert-2	27	14	5	8	69	39	+30	47 (Note: Head-to-head points: Alashkert-2 3, Sevan 0.)	
7	Sevan	28	14	5	9	52	42	+10	47	
8	Urartu-2	28	14	3	11	72	40	+32	45	
9	Ararat-2	27	11	4	12	59	56	+3	37	
10	Torpedo Yerevan (D, R)	28	8	3	17	48	92	−44	27	Suspended after the season
11	Aragats (D, R)	28	7	6	15	56	71	−15	27 (Note: Head-to-head points: Aragats 4, Shirak-2 1.)	Suspended after the season
12	Shirak-2	29	7	6	16	41	72	−31	27	
13	Lernayin Artsakh	25	6	6	13	43	44	−1	24	
14	Ani	28	6	3	19	31	108	−77	21	
15	Masis (D, R)	27	5	5	17	44	82	−38	20	Suspended after the season
16	Dilijan	26	5	4	17	36	97	−61	19	
17	Pyunik-2	27	5	2	20	44	76	−32	17	

Updated to match(es) played on 2 July 2020. Source: ffa.am Soccerway
Rules for classification: 1) Points; 2) Play-off (only if deciding champion); 3) Matches won; 4) Head-to-head points; 5) Head-to-head matches won; 6) Head-to-head goal difference; 7) Head-to-head goals scored; 8) Head-to-head away goals scored; 9) Goal difference; 10) Goals scored.
(C) Champions; (D) Disqualified; (P) Promoted; (R) Relegated

== Armenian Cup ==
=== Final ===
10 July 2020
19:00 (UTC+4)

Noah	5–5 (a.e.t.)	Ararat-Armenia
Mayrovich 39', 60'; Kryuchkov (yellow card) 49'; Azarov 56' (pen.), 115' (pen.); Spătaru 67'; Kovalenko (yellow card) 106'; V. Movsisyan (yellow card) 113'	Report	Louis 8', 40'; A. Tatayev 23' (o.g.); Otubanjo 29', 117'; Achenteh (yellow card) 55'; Kobyalko (yellow card) 89'; Kódjo (red card) 90+3'; Čupić (yellow card) 120+2'
Penalties
K. Bor (penalty missed); Azarov (penalty scored); V. Avetisyan (penalty missed); Gareginyan (penalty scored); S. Dmitriev (penalty scored); Kovalenko (penalty scored); E. Grigoryan (penalty scored); Kryuchkov (penalty scored); R. Krusnauskas (penalty scored)	7–6	(penalty missed) A. Nahapetyan; (penalty scored) Kobyalko; (penalty scored) Ângelo; (penalty missed) Malakyan; (penalty scored) Otubanjo; (penalty scored) Sanogo; (penalty scored) Christian; (penalty scored) Guz; (penalty missed) Danielyan

Yerevan Football Academy Stadium, Yerevan
Attendance: 0
Referee: Zaven Hovhannisyan

== National team ==
=== UEFA Euro 2020 qualification ===
Pos	Team	Pld	W	D	L	GF	GA	GD	Pts	Qualification	(Italy)	(Finland)	(Greece)	(Bosnia and Herzegovina)	(Armenia)	(Liechtenstein)
1	Italy	10	10	0	0	37	4	+33	30	Qualify for final tournament	—	2–0	2–0	2–1	9–1	6–0
2	Finland	10	6	0	4	16	10	+6	18	Qualify for final tournament	1–2	—	1–0	2–0	3–0	3–0
3	Greece	10	4	2	4	12	14	−2	14		0–3	2–1	—	2–1	2–3	1–1
4	Bosnia and Herzegovina	10	4	1	5	20	17	+3	13	Advance to play-offs via Nations League	0–3	4–1	2–2	—	2–1	5–0
5	Armenia	10	3	1	6	14	25	−11	10		1–3	0–2	0–1	4–2	—	3–0
6	Liechtenstein	10	0	2	8	2	31	−29	2		0–5	0–2	0–2	0–3	1–1	—

Source: UEFA
Rules for classification: Qualification tiebreakers

5 September 2019 UEFA Euro 2020 qualifying	Armenia	1 – 3	Italy	Yerevan, Armenia
20:00 UTC+4	Karapetian 11'	Report	Belotti 28'; Lo. Pellegrini 77'; Ayrapetyan 80' (o.g.)	Stadium: Vazgen Sargsyan Republican Stadium; Attendance: 13,680; Referee: Daniel Siebert (Germany)

8 September 2019 UEFA Euro 2020 qualifying	Armenia	4 – 2	Bosnia and Herzegovina	Yerevan, Armenia
17:00 UTC+4	Mkhitaryan 3', 66'; Hambardzumyan 77'; Lončar 90+5' (o.g.)	Report	Džeko 13'; Gojak 70'	Stadium: Vazgen Sargsyan Republican Stadium; Attendance: 12,457; Referee: Benoît Bastien (France)

12 October 2019 UEFA Euro 2020 qualifying	Liechtenstein	1 – 1	Armenia	Vaduz, Liechtenstein
20:45 UTC+2	Y. Frick 72'	Report	Barseghyan 19'	Stadium: Rheinpark Stadion; Attendance: 2,285; Referee: István Kovács (Romania)

15 October 2019 UEFA Euro 2020 qualifying	Finland	3 – 0	Armenia	Turku, Finland
19:00 UTC+3	Jensen 31'; Pukki 61', 88'	Report		Stadium: Veritas Stadion; Attendance: 7,231; Referee: Jesús Gil Manzano (Spain)

15 November 2019 UEFA Euro 2020 qualifying	Armenia	0 – 1	Greece	Yerevan, Armenia
21:00 UTC+4		Report	Limnios 35'	Stadium: Vazgen Sargsyan Republican Stadium; Attendance: 6,450; Referee: Paweł Raczkowski (Poland)

18 November 2019 UEFA Euro 2020 qualifying	Italy	9 – 1	Armenia	Palermo, Italy
20:45 UTC+2	Immobile 8', 33'; Zaniolo 9', 64'; Barella 29'; Romagnoli 72'; Jorginho 75' (pen.); Orsolini 78'; Chiesa 81'	Report	Babayan 79'	Stadium: Stadio Renzo Barbera; Attendance: 27,752; Referee: Tiago Martins (Portugal)
