= 2019–20 Armenian First League =

Armenian First League
- Season: 2019–20
- Dates: 6 August 2019 – 27 May 2020
- Biggest home win: Urartu-2 7–0 Ani (6 August 2019); Urartu-2 7–0 Dilijan (17 August 2019)
- Biggest away win: Masis 0–9 Urartu-2 (13 August 2019)
- Highest scoring: Torpedo Yerevan 2–8 Ararat-2 (21 August 2019)
- All statistics correct as of 31 August 2019.

The 2019–20 Armenian First League season was the 28th since its establishment. The season was launched on August 6, 2019, and concluded on May 27, 2020. Sevan are the defending champions.

== Summary ==
A total of 17 clubs entered the competition with only 11 clubs being eligible for promotion, while the other 6 teams are the reserve teams of clubs from the Armenian Premier League.

== Team changes ==
- Junior Sevan FC were renamed Sevan FC.
- FC Ani from Yerevan, a newly-founded club in 2019.
- FC Aragats from Ashatarak, a newly-founded club in 2019.
- BKMA Yerevan from Yerevan, existed between 1947 and 1993, re-founded in 2019 (home venue in Vagharshapat).
- Dilijan FC from Dilijan, a newly-founded club in 2018, joined the league in 2019.
- Lernayin Artsakh FC from Stepanakert, left the Artsakh Football League to play in Armenian First League instead. Since clubs playing in Armenian leagues cannot play games in Artsakh, Lernayin Artsakh will play their home games in Sisian instead.
- Masis FC from Masis, a newly-founded club in 2019.
- FC Torpedo Yerevan from Yerevan, a newly-founded club in 2019 (home venue in Abovyan).
- FC Van from Charentsavan, a newly-founded club in 2019.
- FC West Armenia from Yerevan, a newly-founded club in 2019.

Promoted to 2019–20 Armenian Premier League:

- FC Yerevan as 2018–19 Armenian First League runners-up.

Although Junior Sevan were reigned as champions, however, they did not gain promotion to the 2019–20 Armenian Premier League, due to not meeting the requirements of the Football Federation of Armenia to take part at the Armenian Premier League competition. Instead, runners-up Yerevan gained promotion, as they met the above-mentioned requirements.

== Stadiums and locations ==
Locations of the 2019–20 Armenian First League teams

Club	Location	Stadium	Capacity
Alashkert-2	Yerevan	Pyunik Stadium	780
Ani	Yerevan	Pyunik Stadium	780
Aragats	Ashtarak	Kasakhi Marzik Stadium	3,600
Ararat-2	Yerevan	Dzoraghbyur Training Centre	n/a
Ararat-Armenia-2	Yerevan	Yerevan Football Academy	n/a
BKMA	Yerevan	Vagharshapat Football Academy	300
Dilijan	Dilijan	UWC Dilijan Football Ground	500
Lernayin Artsakh	Sisian	Sisian City Stadium	500
Lokomotiv Yerevan	Yerevan	Mika Stadium	7,200
Masis	Masis	Dzoraghbyur Training Centre	n/a
Pyunik-2	Yerevan	Pyunik Stadium	780
Sevan	Sevan	Sevan City Stadium	500
Shirak-2	Gyumri	Gyumri City Stadium	2,844
Torpedo Yerevan	Yerevan	Abovyan City Stadium	3,946
Urartu-2	Yerevan	Urartu Training Centre	500
Van	Charentsavan	Charentsavan City Stadium	5,000
West Armenia	Yerevan	Dzoraghbyur Training Centre	n/a

== League table ==
Pos	Team	Pld	W	D	L	GF	GA	GD	Pts	Promotion
1	Van (C, P)	28	22	4	2	90	18	+72	70 (Note: Head-to-head points: Van 4, Lokomotiv Yerevan 1.)	Promotion to the Armenian Premier League
2	Lokomotiv Yerevan (D, R)	27	22	4	1	76	23	+53	70	Suspended after the season
3	West Armenia	27	21	3	3	80	37	+43	66	
4	BKMA	27	16	2	9	63	35	+28	50	
5	Ararat-Armenia-2	27	15	3	9	75	47	+28	48	
6	Alashkert-2	27	14	5	8	69	39	+30	47 (Note: Head-to-head points: Alashkert-2 3, Sevan 0.)	
7	Sevan	28	14	5	9	52	42	+10	47	
8	Urartu-2	28	14	3	11	72	40	+32	45	
9	Ararat-2	27	11	4	12	59	56	+3	37	
10	Torpedo Yerevan (D, R)	28	8	3	17	48	92	−44	27	Suspended after the season
11	Aragats (D, R)	28	7	6	15	56	71	−15	27 (Note: Head-to-head points: Aragats 4, Shirak-2 1.)	Suspended after the season
12	Shirak-2	29	7	6	16	41	72	−31	27	
13	Lernayin Artsakh	25	6	6	13	43	44	−1	24	
14	Ani	28	6	3	19	31	108	−77	21	
15	Masis (D, R)	27	5	5	17	44	82	−38	20	Suspended after the season
16	Dilijan	26	5	4	17	36	97	−61	19	
17	Pyunik-2	27	5	2	20	44	76	−32	17	

Updated to match(es) played on 2 July 2020. Source: ffa.am Soccerway
Rules for classification: 1) Points; 2) Play-off (only if deciding champion); 3) Matches won; 4) Head-to-head points; 5) Head-to-head matches won; 6) Head-to-head goal difference; 7) Head-to-head goals scored; 8) Head-to-head away goals scored; 9) Goal difference; 10) Goals scored.
(C) Champions; (D) Disqualified; (P) Promoted; (R) Relegated

== Results ==
Home \ Away	ALA	ANI	ARG	ARA	AAR	BKM	DIL	LER	LOK	MAS	PYU	SEV	SHI	TOR	URA	VAN	WES
Alashkert-2	—		7–2	1–2	7–1	2–4	1–1	1–1	0–2	5–0	4–1	3–2	1–0	5–1		1–2	0–5
Ani	0–5	—	3–2	0–1	1–2	0–8		0–0	1–5	2–0	0–3	0–1	5–4	1–2	0–12	1–8	
Aragats	3–3	2–2	—	2–2		1–3	0–3	0–2	2–2	0–1		4–3	6–1	3–4	3–2	0–1	1–2
Ararat-2	0–2	3–5	0–1	—	3–4	1–2	5–2		1–3	7–2	1–0	0–0	1–4	5–2	3–0	0–6	4–5
Ararat-Armenia-2	3–0	9–2	6–0		—		7–1	2–2		3–2	3–0	1–1	4–0	6–0	1–3	1–2	1–3
BKMA	1–2	2–0	6–1	2–1	3–2	—	1–0		1–2	1–0	2–0	2–4		7–0	1–0	0–4	2–3
Dilijan	0–7	4–2	1–5				—	4–2		1–1	3–2	0–1	4–4	1–2	1–5	0–1	0–8
Lernayin Artsakh	0–0	5–0		0–2	1–2	0–3	6–1	—			3–0	1–3	3–1		0–0		1–2
Lokomotiv Yerevan	3–2	2–0		4–0		2–1	3–1	3–0	—	2–1	7–0	2–0	2–1	4–1	2–0	0–0	1–1
Masis			3–7	1–3	3–3	1–2		5–3	2–7	—	8–3	1–1	2–2	1–1	0–9	0–3	1–2
Pyunik-2	0–3	1–2	2–2		2–1		6–0	5–1	0–4	4–1	—	2–4	0–1		3–4	0–2	2–5
Sevan		0–3	1–0	2–3	4–2		4–1	1–0	2–2	3–2	5–2	—	0–0		3–1	2–0	0–3
Shirak-2	1–3	0–0	2–2	1–1	2–3	0–3	8–2		0–6	1–4	1–0	2–0	—	2–1	0–1		0–3
Torpedo Yerevan	1–1	12–0	1–4	2–8	0–4	2–1	1–1	0–6	2–3	2–0	5–4	1–2		—		0–7	1–2
Urartu-2	3–2	7–0	2–1	1–0	0–1	1–1	7–0		1–2	1–2	0–0	2–1	5–1	3–0	—	0–5	
Van	0–1	5–0	4–1	3–0	2–0	1–1	5–1	3–3	3–0	4–0			6–0	4–3	2–0	—	4–0
West Armenia		3–1	2–1		2–2	2–1		3–2	0–1		4–2	2–1	3–0	7–0	5–2	3–3	—

Updated to match(es) played on 2 July 2020. Source: ffa.am
Legend: Blue = home team win; Yellow = draw; Red = away team win.

== Season statistics ==
=== Top scorers ===
As of match played 2 July 2020

Rank	Player	Club	Goals
1	(Armenia) Hakob Khachatryan	Ararat-Armenia-2	35
2	(Ivory Coast) Wilfried Eza	Van	32
3	(Russia) Sergei Orlov	West Armenia	31
4	(Armenia) Erik Petrosyan	Urartu-2	25
5	(Armenia) Jirayr Shaghoyan	BKMA Yerevan	23
6	(Armenia) Karapet Manukyan	Lokomotiv Yerevan	21
7	(Russia) Mikhail Zhabkin	West Armenia	20
8	(Armenia) Alen Karapetyan	Aragats	19
9	(Armenia) Aram Loretsyan	Sevan	15
9	(Armenia) Ahmed Jindoyan	Alashkert-2	15
