= 2019–20 Armenian Premier League =

Armenian Premier League
- Season: 2019–20
- Dates: 2 August 2019-14 July 2020
- Champions: Ararat-Armenia
- Champions League: Ararat-Armenia
- Europa League: Noah; Alashkert; Shirak
- Matches: 125
- Goals: 329 (2.63 per match)
- Top goalscorer: Mory Kone (23 goals)
- Biggest home win: Lori 8–0 Yerevan (1 December 2019)
- Biggest away win: Yerevan 2–8 Pyunik (25 November 2019)
- Highest scoring: Yerevan 2–8 Pyunik (25 November 2019)
- Longest winning run: 4 matches Alashkert
- Longest unbeaten run: 10 matches Shirak
- Longest winless run: 18 matches Yerevan
- Longest losing run: 18 matches Yerevan
- All statistics correct as of 14 July 2020.

The 2019–20 Armenian Premier League season was the 28th since its establishment.

== Season events ==
On 21 February, the Football Federation of Armenia announced that FC Yerevan had withdrawn from the league due to financial and technical problems.

On 12 March 2020, the Football Federation of Armenia announced that all Armenian Premier League games had been postponed until 23 March due to the COVID-19 pandemic.

On 10 July, Lori announced that 17 of the players and staff had tested positive for COVID-19, and as a result the whole club was now isolating, and as a result their last game of the season, scheduled for 14 July against Ararat Yerevan was cancelled with the points not being awarded to either team.

== Teams ==
Locations of the 2019–20 Armenian Premier League teams

Club	Location	Stadium	Capacity
Alashkert	Yerevan (Shengavit)	Alashkert Stadium	6,850
Ararat	Yerevan (Kentron)	Vazgen Sargsyan Stadium	14,403
Ararat-Armenia	Yerevan (Avan)	Yerevan Football Academy Stadium	1,428
Gandzasar	Yerevan (Avan)	Yerevan Football Academy Stadium^{1}	1,428
Lori	Vanadzor	Vanadzor Football Academy^{2}	880
Noah	Yerevan (Shengavit)	Alashkert Stadium^{3}	6,850
Pyunik	Yerevan (Kentron)	Vazgen Sargsyan Stadium	14,403
Shirak	Gyumri	Gyumri City Stadium	4,500
Urartu^{5}	Yerevan (Malatia-Sebastia)	Banants Stadium	4,860
Yerevan	Vanadzor	Vanadzor Football Academy^{4}	880

- ^{1}Gandzasar played their home games at the Yerevan Football Academy Stadium in Yerevan, due to the rebuilding of their regular venue Gandzasar Stadium, Kapan.
- ^{2}Lori played at the main training pitch of the Vanadzor Football Academy due to the rebuilding of their regular venue Vanadzor City Stadium, Vanadzor.
- ^{3}Noah played at the Alashkert Stadium, Yerevan, instead of their regular venue Mika Stadium, Yerevan.
- ^{4}Yerevan played at the main training pitch of the Vanadzor Football Academy, instead of their original venue Yerevan Football Academy Stadium, Yerevan.
- ^{5}Banants renamed Urartu FC on 2 August 2019.

=== Personnel and sponsorship ===
Team	Manager	Captain	Kit manufacturer	Shirt sponsor
Alashkert	(Armenia) Yegishe Melikyan	(Armenia) Artak Grigoryan	(Spain) Joma	Bagratour, Huawei
Ararat	(Armenia) Gagik Simonyan (Interim)	(Armenia) Artak Aleksanyan	(United States) Nike	AWI International
Ararat-Armenia	(Armenia) Vardan Minasyan	(Russia) Dmitry Guz	(Spain) Joma	Tashir Group
Gandzasar	(Armenia) Armen Petrosyan	(Armenia) Gevorg Nranyan	(Germany) Adidas	ZCMC
Lori	(Armenia) Armen Sanamyan (Caretaker)	(Armenia) Artyom Khachaturov	(Germany) Puma	TotoGaming
Noah	(Moldova) Vadim Boreț	(Armenia) David Manoyan	(England) Umbro	
Pyunik	(Armenia) Suren Chakhalyan (Caretaker)	(Armenia) Karlen Mkrtchyan	(Germany) Puma	TotoGaming
Shirak	(Armenia) Vardan Bichakhchyan	(Armenia) Aghvan Davoyan	(Switzerland) Fourteen	
Urartu	(Armenia) Aleksandr Grigoryan	(Armenia) Vahagn Ayvazyan	(Germany) Jako	
Yerevan			(France) Kipsta	

=== Managerial changes ===
Team	Outgoing manager	Manner of departure	Date of vacancy	Position in table	Incoming manager	Date of appointmentr
Ararat Yerevan	(Russia) Sergei Bulatov	Resigned	29 July 2019	Pre-season	(Russia) Sergei Boyko (Interim)	29 July 2019
Alashkert	(Armenia) Abraham Khashmanyan	Sacked	4 September 2019		(Armenia) Armen Adamyan (Caretaker)	4 September 2019
Yerevan	(Serbia) Nebojša Petrović	Sacked	5 September 2019	10th	(Armenia) Georgi Ghazaryan (Caretaker)	5 September 2019
Ararat Yerevan	(Russia) Sergei Boyko (Interim)	Resigned	16 September 2019	1st	(Armenia) Gagik Simonyan (Interim)	16 September 2019
Yerevan	(Armenia) Georgi Ghazaryan (Caretaker)	End of Caretaker Spell	16 September 2019	10th	(Moldova) Vlad Goian	16 September 2019
Yerevan	(Moldova) Vlad Goian	Sacked	4 October 2019	10th	(Portugal) António Caldas	4 October 2019
Pyunik	(Russia) Aleksandr Tarkhanov	Became Vice President of Development	30 October 2019	7th	(Armenia) Suren Chakhalyan (Caretaker)	30 October 2019
Yerevan	(Portugal) António Caldas	Resigned	11 November 2019	10th		
Urartu	(Russia) Ilshat Fayzulin	Resigned	24 November 2019	8th	(Armenia) Aleksandr Grigoryan	24 November 2019
Lori	(Spain) David Campaña	Contract Expired	2 June 2020	2nd	(Armenia) Armen Sanamyan (Caretaker)	2 June 2020
Alashkert	(Armenia) Armen Adamyan (Caretaker)	End of contract	28 June 2020	3rd	(Armenia) Yegishe Melikyan	28 June 2020

== Regular season ==
=== League table ===
Pos	Team	Pld	W	D	L	GF	GA	GD	Pts	Qualification
1	Ararat-Armenia	18	11	3	4	33	15	+18	36	Qualification for the Championship round
2	Lori	18	9	5	4	27	19	+8	32	Qualification for the Championship round
3	Alashkert	18	9	4	5	33	20	+13	31	Qualification for the Championship round
4	Ararat	18	9	4	5	25	18	+7	31	Qualification for the Championship round
5	Noah	18	9	3	6	25	19	+6	30	Qualification for the Championship round
6	Shirak	18	8	4	6	25	18	+7	28	Qualification for the Championship round
7	Pyunik	18	7	2	9	35	36	−1	23	Qualification for the Relegation round
8	Urartu	18	6	5	7	22	24	−2	23	Qualification for the Relegation round
9	Gandzasar	18	4	6	8	20	25	−5	18	Qualification for the Relegation round
10	Yerevan (R, D)	18	0	0	18	11	62	−51	0	Withdrawn

Source: Soccerway
Rules for classification: 1) Points; 2) Play-off (only if deciding champion); 3) Matches won; 4) Head-to-head points; 5) Head-to-head matches won; 6) Head-to-head goal difference; 7) Head-to-head goals scored; 8) Head-to-head away goals scored; 9) Goal difference; 10) Goals scored.
(D) Disqualified; (R) Relegated

=== Results ===
Home \ Away	ALA	ARA	AAR	GAN	LOR	NOA	PYU	SHI	URA	YER
Alashkert	—	1–1	2–1	2–0	0–1	0–1	1–1	1–2	2–1	5–1
Ararat	1–1	—	0–3	1–1	0–0	1–0	4–2	2–1	1–0	1–0
Ararat-Armenia	2–0	1–0	—	3–1	0–0	3–1	3–1	1–0	0–0	7–2
Gandzasar	2–2	0–1	2–1	—	1–1	1–1	1–2	1–0	2–4	2–0
Lori	2–1	1–4	2–0	2–1	—	1–0	2–2	0–0	2–1	8–0
Noah	1–2	2–0	1–2	2–1	3–1	—	4–2	0–0	2–0	3–1
Pyunik	0–3	1–4	0–3	2–0	3–1	1–2	—	1–0	1–2	4–1
Shirak	1–3	2–1	1–0	0–0	1–2	3–0	3–1	—	3–1	2–1
Urartu	2–4	1–0	1–1	1–1	2–0	0–0	0–3	2–2	—	3–0
Yerevan	0–3	1–3	1–2	0–3	0–1	0–2	2–8	1–4	0–1	—

Source: soccerway.com
Legend: Blue = home team win; Yellow = draw; Red = away team win.

== Championship round ==
=== Championship round league table ===
Pos	Team	Pld	W	D	L	GF	GA	GD	Pts	Qualification
1	Ararat-Armenia (C)	28	15	7	6	45	23	+22	52	Qualification for the Champions League first qualifying round
2	Noah	28	14	6	8	37	27	+10	48	Qualification for the Europa League first qualifying round (Note: team qualified for the Europa League first qualifying round by winning the 2019–20 Armenian Cup.)
3	Alashkert	28	14	5	9	51	31	+20	47	Qualification for the Europa League first qualifying round
4	Shirak	28	13	7	8	40	30	+10	46	Qualification for the Europa League first qualifying round
5	Lori	27	10	10	7	35	33	+2	40	(Note: Match between Lori and Ararat Yerevan was cancelled on 10 July, with no points being awarded.)
6	Ararat	27	9	6	12	31	36	−5	33	(Note: Match between Lori and Ararat Yerevan was cancelled on 10 July, with no points being awarded.)

Source: Soccerway
Rules for classification: 1) Points; 2) Play-off (only if deciding champion); 3) Matches won; 4) Head-to-head points; 5) Head-to-head matches won; 6) Head-to-head goal difference; 7) Head-to-head goals scored; 8) Head-to-head away goals scored; 9) Goal difference; 10) Goals scored.
(C) Champions

=== Championship round results ===
Home \ Away	ALA	ARA	AAR	LOR	NOA	SHI
Alashkert	—	2–1	1–2	5–1	0–1	1–2
Ararat	1–3	—	0–1	1–1	0–0	1–4
Ararat-Armenia	0–0	4–2	—	0–0	2–0	1–1
Lori	0–2	–	2–1	—	2–2	1–1
Noah	1–0	1–0	1–1	2–1	—	4–0
Shirak	2–4	2–0	1–0	0–0	2–0	—

Source: Soccerway
Legend: Blue = home team win; Yellow = draw; Red = away team win.

== Relegation round ==
=== Relegation round league table ===
Pos	Team	Pld	W	D	L	GF	GA	GD	Pts
1	Urartu	22	8	6	8	26	27	−1	30
2	Pyunik	22	8	2	12	39	42	−3	26
3	Gandzasar	22	6	7	9	25	29	−4	25

Source: Soccerway
Rules for classification: 1) Points; 2) Play-off (only if deciding champion); 3) Matches won; 4) Head-to-head points; 5) Head-to-head matches won; 6) Head-to-head goal difference; 7) Head-to-head goals scored; 8) Head-to-head away goals scored; 9) Goal difference; 10) Goals scored.

=== Relegation round results ===
Home \ Away	GAN	PYU	URA
Gandzasar	—	1–0	1–1
Pyunik	2–3	—	1–2
Urartu	1–0	0–1	—

Source: Soccerway
Legend: Blue = home team win; Yellow = draw; Red = away team win.

== Season statistics ==
=== Scoring ===
==== Top scorers ====
As of match played 14 July 2020

Rank	Player	Club	Goals
1	(Ivory Coast) Mory Kone	Shirak	23
2	(Haiti) Jonel Désiré	Lori	12
3	(Bosnia and Herzegovina) Aleksandar Glišić	Alashkert	11
3	(Russia) Maksim Mayrovich	Noah	11
5	(North Macedonia) Denis Mahmudov	Pyunik	9
5	(Cape Verde) Mailson Lima	Ararat-Armenia	9
5	(Brazil) Gustavo Marmentini	Alashkert	9
8	(Russia) Vladimir Azarov	Noah	8
8	(Brazil) Thiago Galvão	Alashkert	8
10	(Russia) Yevgeni Kobzar	Urartu	7
10	(Russia) Ramazan Isayev	Yerevan/Ararat	7
10	(Nigeria) Yusuf Otubanjo	Ararat-Armenia	7

==== Hat-tricks ====
Player	For	Against	Result	Date	Ref
(Ivory Coast) Mory Kone	Shirak	Pyunik	3-1	25 August 2019	
(North Macedonia) Denis Mahmudov^{4}	Pyunik	Yerevan	8-2	25 November 2019	
(Haiti) Jonel Désiré^{5}	Lori	Yerevan	8-0	1 December 2019	

- ^{4} Player scored 4 goals
- ^{5} Player scored 5 goals

=== Clean sheets ===
As of match played 14 July 2020

Rank	Player	Club	Clean sheets
1	(Russia) Dmitry Abakumov	Ararat-Armenia	10
2	(Russia) Vsevolod Yermakov	Shirak	8
2	(Italy) Valerio Vimercati	Noah	8
4	(Armenia) Vardan Shapperi	Lori	7
5	(Russia) Sergei Revyakin	Ararat Yerevan	6
6	(Serbia) Ognjen Čančarević	Alashkert	4
7	(Montenegro) Andrija Dragojević	Pyunik	3
7	(Armenia) Aram Ayrapetyan	Urartu	3
9	(Armenia) Gevorg Kasparov	Gandzasar Kapan	2
9	(Armenia) Grigor Meliksetyan	Gandzasar Kapan	2
9	(Armenia) Anatoliy Ayvazov	Urartu	2
9	(Russia) Maksim Shvagirev	Noah	2
