= Karen Dokhoyan =

Armenian footballer

Personal information
- Full name: Karen Dokhoyan
- Date of birth: 6 October 1976 (age 50)
- Place of birth: Yerevan, Soviet Union
- Height: 1.85 m (6 ft 1 in)
- Position: Centre back

Senior career*
| Years | Team | Apps | (Gls) |
| 1992–1993 | Malatia Yerevan | 37 | (1) |
| 1994–1996 | Homenmen-SKIF Yerevan | 28 | (1) |
| 1996–1999 | FC Yerevan | 78 | (12) |
| 1999–2000 | Araks Ararat | 9 | (0) |
| 2000–2006 | Krylia Sovetov Samara | 162 | (3) |
| 2007–2008 | Pyunik Yerevan | 51 | (1) |

International career^{‡}
| 1999–2008 | Armenia | 48 | (2) |
- * Club domestic league appearances and goals as of 20 November 2008 ‡ National team caps and goals as of 6 February 2008

Karen Dokhoyan (Armenian: Կարեն Դոխոյան, born on 6 October 1976) is an Armenian former football defender. He currently is one of the coaches and scouts of the Armenian Premier League club Pyunik Yerevan. Karen was also a member of the Armenia national team, and has participated in 48 international matches and scored 2 goals since his debut in an away friendly match against Estonia on 18 August 1999. He is most famous for scoring his goal against Romania to draw 1–1 in a 2006 World Cup qualification match. Karen played for the defunct clubs Malatia Yerevan, Erebuni Yerevan, FC Yerevan, Araks Ararat, for the Russian Krylia Sovetov Samara, and for the Armenian Pyunik F.C.

== National team statistics ==
Armenia national team
| Year | Apps | Goals |
|---|---|---|
| 2000 | 7 | 1 |
| 2001 | 7 | 0 |
| 2002 | 2 | 0 |
| 2003 | 5 | 0 |
| 2004 | 5 | 1 |
| 2005 | 7 | 0 |
| 2006 | 4 | 0 |
| 2007 | 7 | 0 |
| 2008 | 3 | 0 |
| Total | 47 | 2 |

== International goals ==
| # | Date | Venue | Opponent | Score | Result | Competition |
|---|---|---|---|---|---|---|
| 1 | 2 February 2000 | Cyprus | Moldova | 2-1 | Win | Friendly |
| 2 | 17 November 2004 | Armenia | Romania | 1-1 | Draw | 2006 WCQ |

== Achievements ==
- Armenian Premier League with FC Yerevan: 1997
- Armenian Premier League with Araks Ararat: 1999
- Armenian Cup with Araks Ararat: 1999
- Russian Premier League bronze medals with Krylia Sovetov Samara: 2004
- Russian Cup finalist with Krylia Sovetov Samara: 2004
- Armenian Supercup with Pyunik Yerevan: 2006
- Armenian Premier League with Pyunik Yerevan: 2007, 2008
