= 1997 Armenian Premier League =

Football league season

Statistics of Armenian Premier League in the 1997 season.

- Dvin Artashat and FC Lori are promoted.
- Homenmen Yerevan changed their name into Erebuni-Homenmen Yerevan.

== League table ==
Pos	Team	Pld	W	D	L	GF	GA	GD	Pts	Qualification or relegation
1	Yerevan (C)	18	13	4	1	41	10	+31	43	Qualification for the Champions League first qualifying round
2	Shirak	18	12	5	1	46	8	+38	41	Qualification for the UEFA Cup first qualifying round
3	Erebuni-Homenmen	18	11	2	5	35	20	+15	35	Qualification for the Intertoto Cup first round
4	Pyunik	18	11	2	5	42	16	+26	35	
5	Tsement Ararat	18	8	3	7	28	27	+1	27	Qualification for the Cup Winners' Cup qualifying round
6	Ararat Yerevan	18	7	6	5	32	21	+11	27	
7	Kotayk	18	5	4	9	31	33	−2	19	
8	Karabakh Yerevan	18	5	3	10	13	28	−15	18	
9	Dvin Artashat (O)	18	1	4	13	16	52	−36	7	Qualification for the Relegation play-off
10	Lori Vanadzor (R)	18	0	1	17	7	76	−69	1	Relegation to First League
11	Van Yerevan (W)	0	–	–	–	–	–	—	0	Club dissolved (Note: Van Yerevan were went into bankruptcy and disbanded before the start of the season.)

Source: RSSSF
(C) Champions; (O) Play-off winners; (R) Relegated; (W) Withdrew

== Results ==
Home \ Away	ARA	DVI	ERE	KAR	KOT	LOR	PYU	SHI	TSE	YER
Ararat Yerevan		3–1	0–1	3–0	1–1	6–1	1–2	1–1	3–1	2–2
Dvin Artashat	2–2		1–3	0–1	0–6	2–0	1–3	1–6	1–1	1–5
Erebuni-Homenmen	1–3	5–0		3–1	4–1	5–1	3–0	0–3	1–2	0–2
Karabakh Yerevan	1–1	0–0	1–2		1–0	2–1	0–1	0–2	0–2	1–4
Kotayk	3–0	4–2	1–1	1–2		8–2	0–3	0–4	1–1	0–0
Lori Vanadzor	0–2	1–1	0–1	0–1	1–3		0–5	0–3	0–1	0–5
Pyunik	1–3	2–0	1–1	3–1	4–1	10–0		0–0	4–0	1–3
Shirak	1–1	4–1	2–0	3–0	3–0	10–0	1–0		3–1	0–0
Tsement Ararat	1–0	5–2	0–2	1–0	2–1	8–0	0–2	0–2		1–4
Yerevan	1–0	1–0	1–2	1–1	2–0	3–0	1–0	3–0	3–1	

Source: RSSSF
Legend: Blue = home team win; Yellow = draw; Red = away team win.

== Promotion/relegation play-off ==
Date	Venue	PL Team	Result	FL Team
20 November	Abovyan	Dvin Artashat	3 - 1	Spitak

== Top goalscorers ==
#	Player		Team	Goals
1	(Armenia)	Arthur Petrosyan	Shirak	18
2	(Armenia)	Sevada Arzumanyan	Erebuni-Homenmen	13
3	(Armenia)	Mkrtich Hovhannisyan	Kotayk	11
4	(Armenia)	Varazdat Avetisyan	Pyunik	10
4	(Armenia)	Tigran Yesayan	Yerevan	10

Source: RSSSF

== See also ==
- 1997 in Armenian football
- 1997 Armenian First League
- 1997 Armenian Cup
