= Alex Magallanes (footballer, born 1997) =

Peruvian footballer

Álex Magallanes
Personal information
- Full name: Álex Martín Magallanes Broggi
- Date of birth: 25 March 1997 (age 29)
- Place of birth: Lima, Peru
- Height: 1.78 m (5 ft 10 in)
- Position: Defender

Team information
- Current team: Deportivo Binacional
- Number: 23

Senior career*
Years	Team	Apps	(Gls)
-2018	Defensor La Bocana	23	(1)
2018-2019	Atlético Grau	14	(2)
2019	FC Gandzasar Kapan	4	(0)
2019-2020	Sport Loreto	6	(0)
2020-2022	Unión Huaral	21	(0)
- * Club domestic league appearances and goals as of 30 September 2021

Álex Martín Magallanes Broggi (born 25 March 1997 in Peru) is a Peruvian retired footballer.

== Career ==
For the second half of 2018/19, Magallanes signed for Gandzasar Kapan in Armenia through an Argentinean of Armenian descent. His father, Peru international Alex Magallanes, advised him to " have a lot of mental strength because living in Europe is not the same as in Peru". After a few months, Magallanes said that the stadiums were good in Armenia while in Peru they were not maintained. However, he left Gandzasar Kapan after four league appearances due to the new head coach only using players over the age of 26.
