= Vlad Goian =

Moldovan football coach (born 1970)

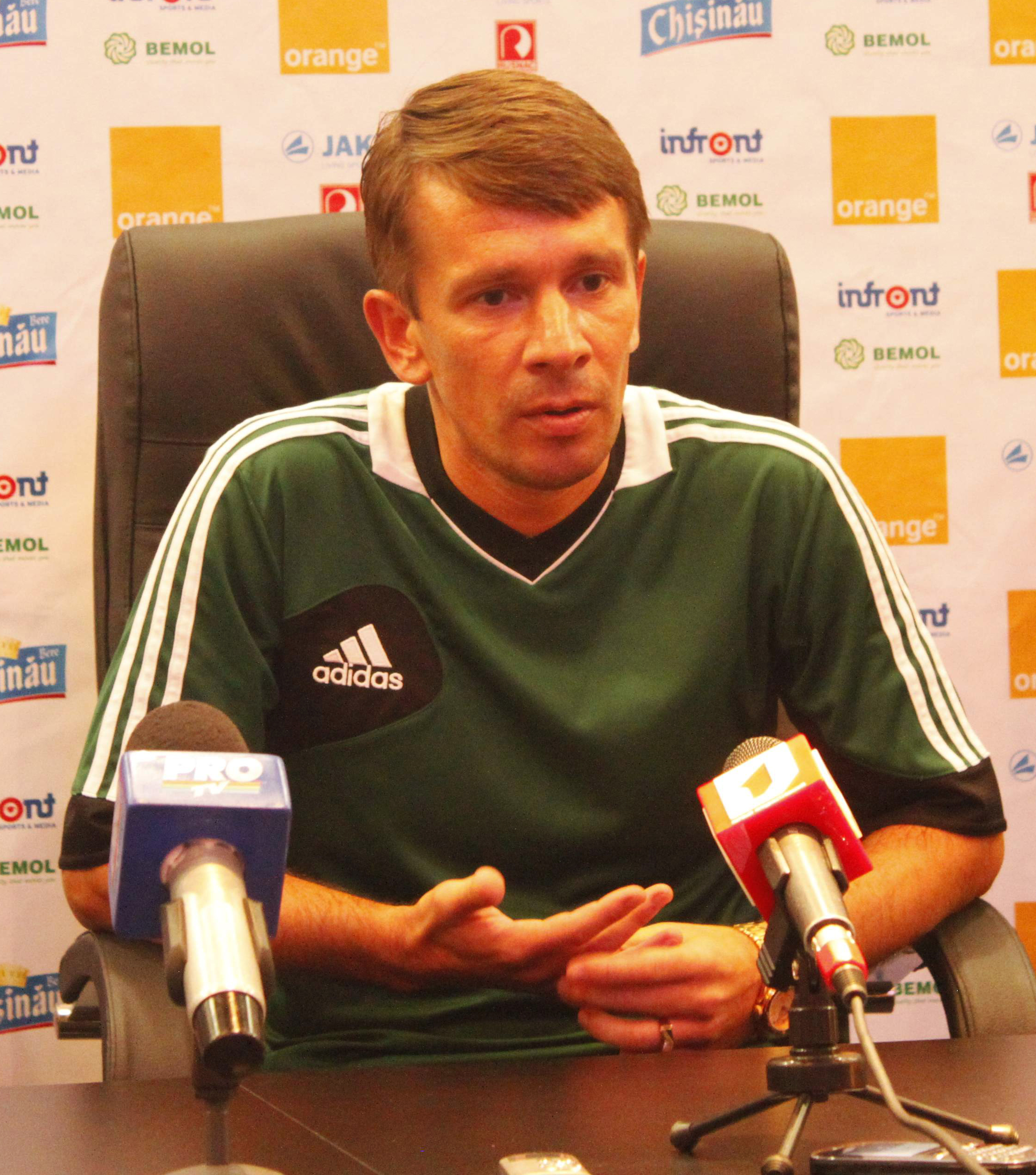
- Goian in 2013

Personal information
- Date of birth: 14 November 1970 (age 55)
- Place of birth: Chișinău, Moldavian SSR, Soviet Union
- Positions: Defender; midfielder

Team information
- Current team: Moldova U16 (head coach)

Youth career
- Zimbru Chișinău

Senior career*
Years	Team	Apps	(Gls)
1991	Zimbru Chișinău		
1992	Olimpia Bălți	19	(3)
1992–1993	Speranța Nisporeni	11	(0)
1993–1994	Codru Călărași	44	(1)
1994–1995	Nistru Otaci	27	(2)
1995–1996	MHM-93	44	(0)
1997	Codru Călărași	12	(0)
1997	Moldova-Gaz Chișinău	18	(0)
1998–1999	Agro Chișinău	47	(0)

Managerial career
- 2006–2007: Zimbru Chișinău (assistant)
- 2007: Rapid Ghidighici
- 2008–2010: Iskra-Stali Rîbnița
- 2011–2014: Tiraspol
- 2015: Saxan
- 2015–2016: Academia Chișinău
- 2016–2017: Zaria Bălți
- 2018–2019: Zaria Bălți
- 2019: Yerevan
- 2020: Zimbru Chișinău
- 2021: Zimbru Chișinău
- 2021–2022: Zimbru Chișinău (assistant)
- 2022: Zimbru Chișinău
- 2023: Spartanii Sportul
- 2025: Moldova U15
- 2025–: Moldova U16
- * Club domestic league appearances and goals

Vlad Goian (born 14 November 1970) is a Moldovan football manager and former player. He is the current head coach of the Moldova national under-16 team.

== Managerial career ==
Between 2011 and 2014, Vlad Goian worked as manager of Tiraspol, winning two times Moldovan Cup with his team.

On 16 September 2019, Goian was appointed manager of Yerevan on a one-year contract, but was replaced by António Caldas as manager on 4 October of the same year.

He holds an UEFA PRO Manager Licence.

=== Zimbru Chișinău ===
On 10 June 2020, Goian was announced as the new head coach of Zimbru Chișinău.

On 16 October 2020, he left his position as head coach to become technical director of the academy of the same club.

On 17 February 2021, he returned as head coach of the club. In November 2021 he has been replaced in post by the Italian manager Michele Bon, being assistant manager under Bon. After Bon was fired in June 2022, Goian returned as head coach of the club until 30 August 2022, when resigned.

== Honours ==
=== Manager ===
Iskra-Stali Rîbnița

- Moldovan National Division: runner-up 2009–10; third place 2008–09

FC Tiraspol

- Moldovan National Division third place: 2012–13
- Moldovan Cup: 2010–11, 2012–13
- Moldovan Super Cup runner-up: 2013

=== Individual ===
- Coach of the year in Moldova: 2008, 2010, 2012
