= Jānis Krūmiņš (footballer) =

Latvian footballer

Personal information
- Date of birth: January 9, 1992 (age 34)
- Place of birth: Riga, Latvia
- Height: 1.88 m (6 ft 2 in)
- Position: Goalkeeper

Youth career
- FK Olimps Riga U19

Senior career*
Years	Team	Apps	(Gls)
2010–2011	FK Olimps Riga	21	(0)
2012–2013	FC Jūrmala	30	(0)
2014	FK Daugava	27	(0)
2015	Akritas Chloraka	13	(0)
2015–2016	Pafos	6	(0)
2017–2019	Jelgava	13	(0)
2019–2020	Yerevan	11	(0)
- * Club domestic league appearances and goals as of 19:57, 27 February 2020 (UTC)

Janis Krūmiņš (born January 9, 1992) is a Latvian professional football player who last played for FC Yerevan in the Armenian First League.

== Career ==
In 2019, Krūmiņš joined FC Yerevan. On 21 February 2020, the Football Federation of Armenia announced that FC Yerevan had withdrawn from the league due to financial and technical problems.
