= Pavel Demidchik =

Belarusian footballer (born 1996)

Personal information
- Date of birth: 30 January 1996 (age 30)
- Place of birth: Kopyl, Minsk Oblast, Belarus
- Position: Forward

Youth career
- 2012–2015: Shakhtyor Soligorsk

Senior career*
Years	Team	Apps	(Gls)
2016	Shakhtyor Soligorsk	0	(0)
2016	→ Slutsk (loan)	3	(1)
2017	Smorgon	15	(3)
2017	Smolevichi-STI	15	(2)
2018–2019	Smorgon	38	(6)
2019–2020	Yerevan	11	(0)
2020	Oshmyany	25	(10)
2021–2022	Arsenal Dzerzhinsk	7	(0)
2023	Drut Belynichi	5	(1)

International career
2014	Belarus U19	1	(0)
- * Club domestic league appearances and goals as of 31 December 2023

Pavel Demidchik (Belarusian: Павел Дзямідчык; Russian: Павел Демидчик; born 30 January 1996) is a Belarusian professional footballer.

== Career ==
On 21 February 2020, the Football Federation of Armenia announced that FC Yerevan had withdrawn from the league due to financial and technical problems.
