= Viulen Ayvazyan =

Armenian professional footballer

Personal information
- Date of birth: 1 January 1995 (age 31)
- Place of birth: Gyumri, Armenia
- Height: 1.83 m (6 ft 0 in)
- Position: Forward

Youth career
- 2010–2012: Pyunik

Senior career*
Years	Team	Apps	(Gls)
2012–2014	Pyunik	45	(14)
2014–2017	Shirak	56	(15)
2017	Ventspils	4	(0)
2018	Dnepr Mogilev	4	(0)
2019	Yerevan	7	(0)
2020	Sevan		
2021	Van	6	(0)

International career^{‡}
2011	Armenia U17	3	(0)
2012	Armenia U19	2	(0)
2012–2016	Armenia U21	8	(0)
- * Club domestic league appearances and goals as of 31 May 2021 ‡ National team caps and goals as of 31 December 2016

Viulen Ayvazyan (Armenian: Վիուլեն Այվազյան; born 1 January 1995) is an Armenian former professional footballer who last played for Van.
