= Masis FC =

Armenian football club

- Full name: Masis Football Club
- Founded: 2019; 7 years ago
- Dissolved: 2020; 6 years ago
- Ground: Masis City Stadium, Masis
- Owner: (Armenia) Artur Voskanyan
Away colours

Masis FC (Armenian: Մասիս Ֆորտբոլային Ակումբ) was an Armenian football club based in the town of Masis, Ararat Province. They played their home games at the Masis City Stadium.

== History ==
On 7 June 2019, Masis FC was officially founded in by Artur Voskanyan. The club represents the town of Masis. In its first year of foundation, Masis applied to take part in the Armenian First League. After the 2019-2020 Armenian First League season was abandoned, Masis were disqualified and are inactive from professional football.

=== Domestic history ===
Season	League									Armenian Cup	Top goalscorer		Manager
Season	Div.	Pos.	Pl.	W	D	L	GS	GA	P	Armenian Cup	Name	League	Manager
2019–20	Armenian First League	15	27	5	5	17	44	82	20	First Round			(Armenia) Samvel Sargsyan
2020–present	no participation												

== Last squad ==
As of 18 August 2019

Note: Flags indicate national team as defined under FIFA eligibility rules; some limited exceptions apply. Players may hold more than one non-FIFA nationality.

No.	Pos.	Nation	Player
9	GK	ARM	Narek Poghosyan
13	DF	ARM	Vahagn Arabyan
14	DF	ARM	Roman Muradyan
15	MF	POR	Tiago Morim Mendes
16	DF	ARM	Vanik Minasyan
18	MF	RUS	Danila Churikov
19	MF	ARM	Samvel Safaryan

No.	Pos.	Nation	Player
24	MF	ARM	Gor Baghdasaryan
28	MF	ARM	Hovhannes Shahinyan
30	MF	ARM	Armen Khachatryan
42	MF	RUS	Nikita Rodichev
71	MF	MDA	Veaceslav Agafonov
88	MF	ARM	Artur Voskanyan
—	FW	RUS	Ivan Yerokhin
