= Vanadzor City Stadium =

Coordinates: 40°47′50″N 44°29′38″E

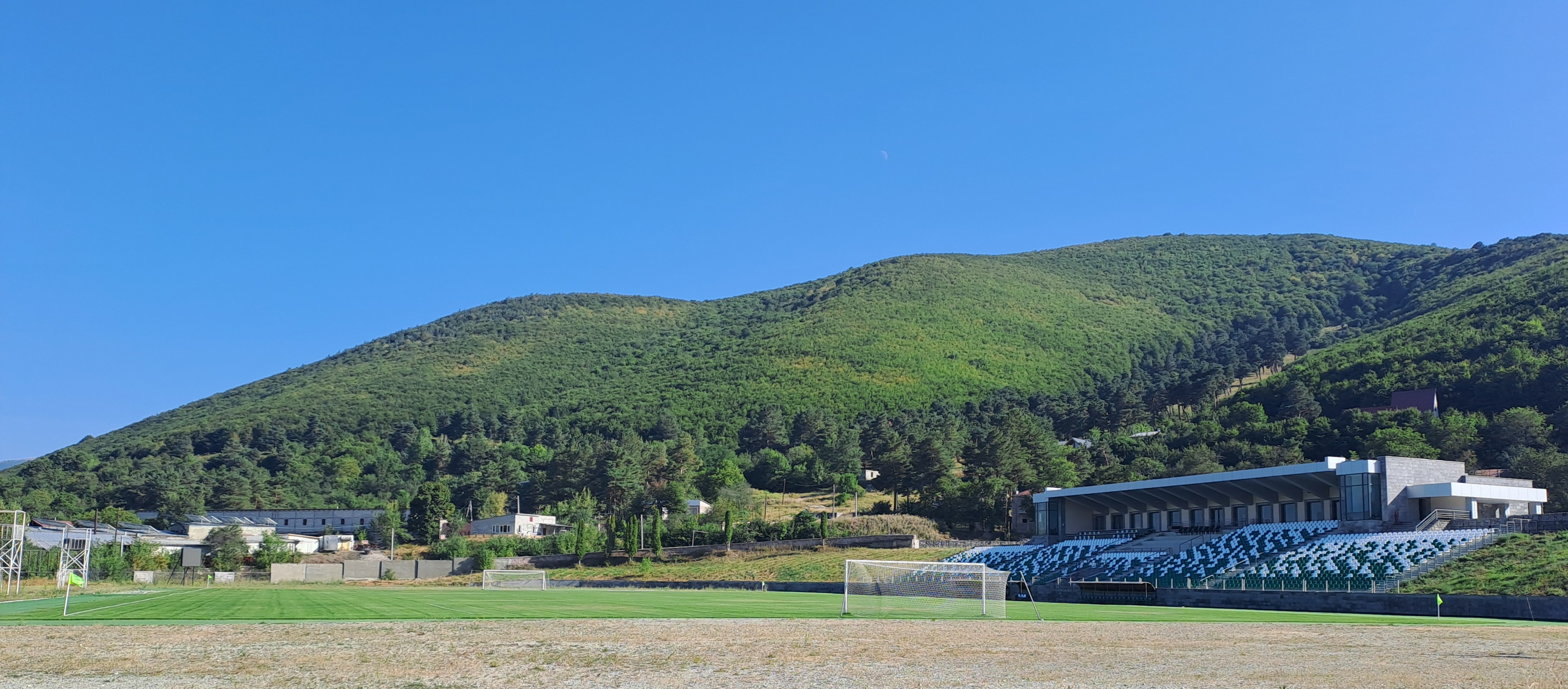
- Vanadzor City Stadium with the city's botanical garden in the background
- Interactive map of Vanadzor City Stadium
- Location: Vanadzor, Armenia
- Owner: Vanadzor City Council
- Operator: Football Federation of Armenia
- Capacity: 2,450
- Surface: grass

Construction
- Built: 1958
- Renovated: 2017-22

Tenants
- Lori Vanadzor (1965-2006); Vanadzor (1992); Lori FC (2018-)

Vanadzor City Stadium (Armenian: Վանաձորի քաղաքային մարզադաշտ), is a multi-use stadium in Vanadzor, Armenia, currently used for football matches. Opened in 1958 as Lori Stadium (Armenian: Լոռի մարզադաշտ) with a capacity of 5,000 spectators, it served as home to Lori Vanadzor and FC Vanadzor. The current capacity of the stadium is 2,450, following its conversion to an all-seater one in 2022.

== Future plans ==
In October 2010, an agreement was achieved between the Vanadzor City Council and the Football Federation of Armenia to renovate the stadium, under the operation of the FFA. However, in August 2011, the Helsinki Citizens’ Assembly-Vanadzor Office appealed against the Vanadzor municipality to abolish the agreement. As a result of the appeal, the 2011-scheduled renovation with an envisaged cost of US dollars 3 million was abandoned.

Finally, in December 2017, a major reconstruction process was launched to redevelop the venue and turn it into an all-seater stadium with a capacity of 2,450 seats upon its completion in 2022.
