= Jeferson Cruz =

Brazilian footballer

Personal information
- Full name: Jeferson Barbosa da Cruz
- Date of birth: 8 April 1999 (age 27)
- Position: Forward

Youth career
- –2017: Vitória

Senior career*
Years	Team	Apps	(Gls)
2017–2018	Dornbirn 1913	20	(7)
2018–2019	Austria Lustenau	3	(0)
2019–2020	Yerevan	7	(1)
- * Club domestic league appearances and goals as of 20:00, 27 February 2020 (UTC)

Jeferson Barbosa da Cruz (born 8 April 1999), known simply as Jeferson Cruz, is a Brazilian footballer who plays as a forward, most recently for Armenian side Yerevan.

== Career ==
On 21 February 2020, the Football Federation of Armenia announced that FC Yerevan had withdrawn from the league due to financial and technical problems.

== Career statistics ==
=== Club ===
As of match played 18 October 2019.

Club	Season	League			Cup		Continental		Other		Total	
Club	Season	Division	Apps	Goals	Apps	Goals	Apps	Goals	Apps	Goals	Apps	Goals
Dornbirn 1913	2017–18	Regionalliga West	20	7	0	0	–		0	0	20	7
Austria Lustenau	2018–19	2. Liga	3	0	1 (Note: Appearances in the Austrian Cup)	0	–		0	0	4	0
Yerevan	2019–20	Armenian Premier League	7	1	0	0	–		–		7	1
Career total			30	8	1	0	0	0	0	0	31	8
