= Nebojša Petrović =

Serbian football manager and player

Personal information
- Date of birth: 14 June 1960 (age 66)
- Place of birth: Pančevo, FPR Yugoslavia
- Position: Forward

Youth career
- Glogonj
- Red Star Belgrade

Senior career*
Years	Team	Apps	(Gls)
1978–1979	Dinara		
1979–1982	Rijeka	24	(1)
1982–1985	Rad	73	(33)
1985–1988	OFK Beograd	61	(12)
1988–1991	Proleter Zrenjanin	67	(28)
Total		225	(74)

Managerial career
- 2000: Rad
- 2003: Dinamo Pančevo
- 2003-2005: Sileks
- 2005: PSK Pančevo
- 2006–2007: Beograd
- 2007: Vršac
- 2009: Pobeda
- 2011–2012: Beograd
- 2012: Mladenovac
- 2012–2013: Sileks
- 2013: Rad
- 2016–2017: Rad
- 2018: BSK Borča
- 2019: Železničar Pančevo
- 2019: FC Yerevan
- 2023-2024: Železničar Pančevo
- * Club domestic league appearances and goals

Nebojša Petrović (Serbian Cyrillic: Небојша Петровић; born 14 June 1960) is a Serbian football manager and former player.

His nickname is Maradona, due to his resemblance to the famous Argentine footballer.

== Club career ==
After coming through the youth system of Red Star Belgrade, Petrović made his Yugoslav First League debut with Rijeka in 1979. He played just 24 league games in his three seasons at Kantrida, eventually moving to Yugoslav Second League side Rad in 1982. Between 1985 and 1988, Petrović spent three seasons with OFK Beograd. He subsequently joined Proleter Zrenjanin, helping them win promotion to the top flight in 1990.

== Managerial career ==
After hanging up his boots, Petrović served as manager of numerous clubs in his homeland and abroad, including Rad (three spells), Macedonian sides Sileks (two spells), and Pobeda, and FC Yerevan from Armenia.
