= Sergey Lynko =

Belarusian footballer

Personal information
- Date of birth: 16 October 1989 (age 37)
- Place of birth: Minsk, Belarusian SSR
- Height: 1.72 m (5 ft 8 in)
- Position: Midfielder

Team information
- Current team: Krumkachy Minsk

Youth career
- 2007–2008: Darida Minsk Raion

Senior career*
Years	Team	Apps	(Gls)
2011–2017	Isloch Minsk Raion	112	(13)
2016	→ Torpedo Minsk (loan)	25	(1)
2018–2019	Torpedo Minsk	36	(1)
2019	Yerevan	5	(0)
2020	Krumkachy Minsk	19	(1)
2021–2022	Dinamo Brest	47	(2)
2023	Molodechno	9	(0)
2023–	Krumkachy Minsk	15	(14)
- * Club domestic league appearances and goals as of 31 December 2023

Sergey Lynko (Belarusian: Сяргей Лынько; Russian: Сергей Лынько; born 16 October 1989) is a Belarusian professional footballer who plays for Krumkachy Minsk.

== Career ==
On 21 February 2020, the Football Federation of Armenia announced that FC Yerevan had withdrawn from the league due to financial and technical problems.
