= Denis Mahmudov =

Macedonian footballer

Personal information
- Full name: Denis Mahmudov
- Date of birth: 6 November 1989 (age 37)
- Place of birth: Titov Veles, SFR Yugoslavia
- Height: 1.70 m (5 ft 7 in)
- Position: Winger

Team information
- Current team: TEC
- Number: 24

Youth career
- Borec
- –2007: Vitesse

Senior career*
Years	Team	Apps	(Gls)
2007–2009	AGOVV	13	(1)
2009–2012	WHC		
2012–2014	Excelsior '31	42	(35)
2014–2015	PEC Zwolle	7	(1)
2014–2015	→ Sparta (loan)	30	(14)
2015	Levski Sofia	10	(0)
2016	Banants	7	(0)
2016–2017	Telstar	26	(4)
2017–2018	FC Dordrecht	38	(15)
2018–2019	Excelsior	18	(3)
2019–2020	Pyunik	16	(9)
2020	Roeselare	0	(0)
2020–2021	Siena	8	(1)
2021–	TEC	3	(0)
- * Club domestic league appearances and goals as of 6 January 2022

Denis Mahmudov (born 6 November 1989) is a Macedonian footballer who plays as a winger for Tweede Divisie club TEC.

== Career ==
=== Club ===
In June 2015, Mahmudov signed a two-year contract with Bulgarian club Levski Sofia, but struggled to establish himself as a regular. He officially parted ways with the "bluemen" in January 2016. In May 2016, Mahmudov was released by Banants, going on to sign for Telstar later that same summer.

On 17 July 2019, Mahmudov signed for FC Pyunik of the Armenian Premier League. On 2 July 2020, Pyunik announced that Mahmudov had left the club after his contract had expired. After leaving Pyunik, Mahmudov signed a two-year contract with Roeselare on 5 August 2020.

He started the 2020–21 season in Italy with Serie D fallen giants Siena, but was released from his contract early in March 2021.

On 8 August 2021, Mahmudov signed with Tweede Divisie club TEC.

== Honours ==
=== Club ===
PEC Zwolle

- Johan Cruyff Shield: 2014
