= Elias (footballer, born 1981) =

Brazilian-Portuguese footballer

Personal information
- Full name: Elias Alves da Silva
- Date of birth: 4 September 1981 (age 45)
- Place of birth: Montalvânia, Brazil
- Height: 1.76 m (5 ft 9 in)
- Position: Midfielder

Senior career*
Years	Team	Apps	(Gls)
2001	Grêmio Inhumense		
2001–2003	Porto B	64	(14)
2003	Porto	1	(0)
2004	Corinthians Alagoano	0	(0)
2004–2005	Estoril	29	(0)
2005–2006	Gil Vicente	25	(0)
2006–2007	Paços Ferreira	25	(1)
2007–2009	Vitória Setúbal	54	(6)
2009–2010	União Leiria	6	(0)
2010–2011	Portimonense	24	(1)
2011	Ermis	9	(0)
2012–2016	Beroe	129	(17)
2016–2018	Vereya	51	(1)
2019	Haskovo		
2019–2020	Yerevan	8	(0)
Total		418	(40)

Managerial career
- 2018: Vereya (assistant)
- 2018: Vereya (caretaker)
- * Club domestic league appearances and goals as of 27 February 2020

Elias Alves da Silva (born 4 September 1981), known simply as Elias, is a Brazilian professional footballer who plays as a midfielder, most recently for Armenian club FC Yerevan.

He also held Portuguese citizenship, due to the many years spent in the country. He amassed Primeira Liga totals of 167 matches and eight goals during eight seasons, in representation of seven clubs.

== Football career ==
Born in Montalvânia, Minas Gerais, Elias started playing professionally with lowly Grêmio Inhumense. He joined FC Porto in 2001, but played mostly for their reserves during his two-year stint; he appeared once for the first team, featuring the last 13 minutes of a 3–2 home win against Varzim S.C. on 17 May 2003 after taking the place of Clayton.

In the 2004–05 season, after a brief spell back in his country with Sport Club Corinthians Alagoano, Elias moved back to Portugal, successively representing in the Primeira Liga G.D. Estoril Praia, Gil Vicente FC, F.C. Paços de Ferreira, Vitória de Setúbal, U.D. Leiria and Portimonense SC. With Vitória he won the domestic League Cup, playing the entire penalty shootout win against Sporting CP and converting his attempt.

On 22 December 2011, Elias joined PFC Beroe Stara Zagora in Bulgaria on a free transfer, signing a one-and-a-half-year contract. He made his league debut on 3 March of the following year, in a 0–3 away loss to PFC Ludogorets Razgrad.

On 2 April 2018, Elias was announced as player-coach of FC Vereya until end of the season, succeeding Blagomir Mitrev.

On 21 February 2020, the Football Federation of Armenia announced that FC Yerevan had withdrawn from the league due to financial and technical problems.

== Honours ==
Porto

- Primeira Liga: 2002–03

Corinthians Alagoano

- Campeonato Alagoano: 2004

Vitória Setúbal

- Taça da Liga: 2007–08

Beroe

- Bulgarian Cup: 2012–13
- Bulgarian Supercup: 2013
