= William Gustavo =

Brazilian footballer

Gustavo
Personal information
- Full name: William Gustavo Constâncio
- Date of birth: 9 January 1992 (age 34)
- Place of birth: Limeira, Brazil
- Height: 1.87 m (6 ft 2 in)
- Position: Centre-back

Senior career*
Years	Team	Apps	(Gls)
2013	Francana	5	(0)
2013	Jacutinga		
2014	Osvaldo Cruz		
2014	Araguaia		
2015–2016	Grêmio Anápolis	11	(0)
2015–2016	→ Académica (loan)	6	(0)
2017	Oleiros	12	(0)
2018	Nõmme Kalju	12	(0)
2019	Altos	5	(0)
2019	Lori	0	(0)
2019–2020	Yerevan	4	(0)
- * Club domestic league appearances and goals as of 27 February 2020

William Gustavo Constâncio (born 9 January 1992), simply known as Gustavo, is a Brazilian professional footballer who plays as a centre-back, most recently for Yerevan.

== Career ==
Born in Limeira, Brazil, Gustavo signed for Académica, on 11 July 2015, on a two-year loan.

On 25 June 2019, Lori FC announced the signing of Gustavo on a two-year contract. On 4 September 2019, FC Yerevan announced the signing of Gustavo on a one-year contract. On 21 February 2020, the Football Federation of Armenia announced that FC Yerevan had withdrawn from the league due to financial and technical problems.
