= António Caldas =

Portuguese footballer (born 1959)

Personal information
- Full name: José António Caldas Oliveira
- Date of birth: 1 May 1959 (age 67)
- Place of birth: Braga, Portugal
- Height: 1.84 m (6 ft 0 in)
- Position: Goalkeeper

Youth career
- 1973–1978: Braga

Senior career*
Years	Team	Apps	(Gls)
1978–1979	Braga	0	(0)
1979–1980	Valdevez		
1981–1984	Riopele		
1984–1985	Vizela	10	(0)
1985–1986	Amarante		
1986–1987	Lourosa		
1987–1988	Lixa		
1988–1992	Paços Ferreira	100	(1)
1992–1993	Leixões	29	(0)
1993–1994	União Madeira	0	(0)
1995	Leça	9	(0)
1995–1997	Leixões	4	(0)

Managerial career
- 1996–1998: Leixões
- 1998–1999: Braga (youth)
- 2001–2005: Braga B
- 2005–2006: Chaves
- 2007–2008: Braga (youth)
- 2007–2008: Braga
- 2010–2011: Benfica Huambo
- 2011–2013: Interclube
- 2013–2016: Sagrada Esperança
- 2019–2020: FC Yerevan
- * Club domestic league appearances and goals

José António Caldas Oliveira (born 1 May 1959), known as Caldas, is a Portuguese retired footballer who played as a goalkeeper, and current manager.

== Playing career ==
Born in Braga, Caldas played youth football with local S.C. Braga. He spent most of his career in the second division, during a 19-year professional career.

Caldas' input in the Primeira Liga consisted of ten games for F.C. Vizela in the 1984–85 season (team relegation), and 16 for F.C. Paços de Ferreira in the 1991–92 campaign. He was also part of top flight squads with Braga and C.F. União, but failed to appear in the league for either club.

== Managerial career ==
Caldas began coaching whilst still an active player, with Leixões SC. He subsequently returned to Braga, being in charge of both the youth and the reserve sides and helping launch the career of Eduardo Carvalho, who went on to gain several caps for Portugal.

In 2006–07, Caldas managed G.D. Chaves before he returned to Braga, again being in charge of the under-19s, but after the sacking of Manuel Machado he was promoted to the main squad of SC Braga where in 2007–2008 he qualified the team in to the first Intertoto Cup Qualification of the UEFA Cup.

Caldas moved to Angola in 2010, where he coached S.H. Benfica (Huambo) and Interclube where he won the Angolan Cup and Super Cup. He made history with Interclub, it was the first time a team of Angola reached the semi-final of the CAF Champions league. He is now currently coaching G.D Sagrada Esperança.] and G.D. Sagrada Esperança.
