= Stanislav Yefimov =

Russian footballer (born 1993)

Personal information
- Full name: Stanislav Valeryevich Yefimov
- Date of birth: 9 August 1993 (age 33)
- Place of birth: Moscow, Russia
- Height: 1.70 m (5 ft 7 in)
- Position: Midfielder

Team information
- Current team: EIF
- Number: 31

Senior career*
Years	Team	Apps	(Gls)
2013–2014	Lokomotiv-2 Moscow	26	(0)
2014–2015	Nosta Novotroitsk	15	(1)
2015–2016	Khimki	21	(1)
2016	Riga	0	(0)
2017	Troitsk		
2017	Ararat-2 Moscow		
2018–2019	Yerevan	27	(43)
2019	Pyunik	4	(0)
2020–2021	Van	23	(4)
2021–	EIF	91	(24)
- * Club domestic league appearances and goals as of 19:48, 26 February 2025 (UTC)

Stanislav Valeryevich Yefimov (Russian: Станислав Валерьевич Ефимов; born 9 August 1993) is a Russian football midfielder who plays for Finnish Ykkösliiga club EIF.

== Club career ==
Yefimov made his debut in the Russian Second Division for FC Lokomotiv-2 Moscow on 20 April 2013 in a game against FC Rus Saint Petersburg.

He made his Russian Football National League debut for FC Khimki on 6 August 2016 in a game against FC Mordovia Saransk.

On 6 June 2019, Yefimov signed for FC Pyunik. On 2 December 2019, Yefimov left Pyunik by mutual consent.

Since 2021, he has played for Ekenäs IF (EIF) in Finland. He debuted in top-tier Veikkausliiga with EIF in the 2024 Veikkausliiga season.

== Honours ==
Individual

- Ykkönen Player of the Month: August 2023
