= Dilijan FC =

Armenian football club

- Full name: Dilijan Football Club
- Founded: November 2018
- Dissolved: 2020
- Ground: UWC Dilijan Football Ground, Dilijan
- Chairman: Will Thomson
- Manager: Gagik Grigoryan
- Final season; 2019–20: Armenian First League, 16th of 17
Home colours	Away colours

Dilijan Football Club (Armenian: Դիլիջան Ֆորտբոլային Ակումբ) was an Armenian football club based in Dilijan, Tavush Province.

== History ==
Dilijan was formed in November 2018, initially as a youth team, by British investor Will Thomson. Ahead of the 2019–20 season, Dilijan were admitted into the Armenian First League as part of an expansion of the league. Following a 16th-place finish in the 2019–20 Armenian First League, Dilijan withdrew from senior football in Armenia.

== Managerial history ==
- (Armenia) Gagik Grigoryan (2019–2020)
