= FC Aragats =

Armenian football club

- Full name: Football Club Aragats
- Founded: 2019; 6 years ago
- Dissolved: 2020; 5 years ago
- Ground: Kasakhi Marzik Stadium, Ashtarak
- Capacity: 3,600
- Owner: Hakob Fahradyan
- President: Hakob Fahradyan
- Manager: vacant
- League: Armenian First League

Football Club Aragats (Armenian: Ֆորտբոլային Ակումբ Արագած), was an Armenian football club based in the town of Ashtarak, Aragatsotn Province. They play their home games at the Kasakhi Marzik Stadium in Ashtarak.

== History ==
On 5 June 2019, FC Aragats was officially founded in Ashtarak by Hakob Fahradyan. In its first year of foundation, Aragats applied to take part in the Armenian First League. On 15 June 2019, Varazdat Avetisyan was appointed as head coach of the team. However, after less than a month, Avetsiyan left his post on 9 July.

== Managerial history ==
- (Armenia) Varazdat Avetisyan (15 June 2019 – 9 July 2019)
