= Ramazan Isayev =

Russian footballer

Personal information
- Full name: Ramazan Shamilovich Isayev
- Date of birth: 17 January 1998 (age 28)
- Place of birth: Makhachkala, Russia
- Height: 1.73 m (5 ft 8 in)
- Position: Forward

Team information
- Current team: Torpedo Vladimir
- Number: 9

Senior career*
Years	Team	Apps	(Gls)
2015	Torpedo Armavir	5	(0)
2016	Dinamo Brest	12	(2)
2016	Radnički Niš	2	(0)
2018	Artsakh	11	(5)
2019	Yerevan	15	(6)
2020	Ararat Yerevan	9	(1)
2020	Legion Dynamo Makhachkala	2	(0)
2020	Lada Dimitrovgrad	6	(2)
2021–2022	Belshina Bobruisk	43	(17)
2022–2023	Naftan Novopolotsk	30	(7)
2024–2025	Ocean Kerch (amateur)		
2025–2026	Anzhi Makhachkala (amateur)		
2026	Ocean Kerch (amateur)		
2026	Anzhi Makhachkala (amateur)		
2026–	Torpedo Vladimir	7	(0)
- * Club domestic league appearances and goals as of 1 November 2026

Ramazan Shamilovich Isayev (Russian: Рамазан Шамилович Исаев; born 17 January 1998) is a Russian football player who plays for Torpedo Vladimir.

== Career ==
=== Club career ===
He made his professional debut in the Russian Football National League for FC Torpedo Armavir on 12 July 2015 in a game against FC Zenit-2 St. Petersburg.

He then played the first half of the 2016–17 season with Radnički Niš. He made 2 appearances with Radnički in the Serbian SuperLiga.

On 9 December 2019, Ararat Yerevan announced the signing of Isayev from FC Yerevan on a contract until June 2021.
