= FC Yerevan =

Armenian professional football club

- Full name: Football Club Yerevan
- Founded: 1995; 30 years ago
- Dissolved: 2019; 6 years ago
- Ground: Pyunik Stadium, Yerevan
- President: Karen Harutyunyan
- Manager: António Caldas
- League: Armenian Premier League
- 2019–20: Armenian Premier League, 10th (withdrew)
Home colours	Away colours

FC Yerevan (Armenian: Ֆուտբոլային Ակումբ Երեւան – Futbolayin Akumb Yerevan) was an Armenian professional football club from the capital Yerevan.

== History ==
FC Yerevan played in the Armenian Premier League and won the 1997 title. It was founded in 1995 and lasted for five years. It played its home matches at the Hrazdan Stadium. After the 1999 season, the club was dissolved and the players moved on to other clubs in Yerevan.

On July 13, 2018, Football Federation of Armenia announced that the FC Yerevan is returning to professional football and will be taking part in the 2018-19 Armenian First League.

On 5 September, Nebojša Petrović was relieved of his duties as Yerevan's manager, with Assistant Coach Georgi Ghazaryan being placed in temporary charge for Yerevan's games against Lori on 13 September. On 16 September, Vlad Goian was appointed as Manager on a one-year contract, before being relieved of his duties and replaced by António Caldas on 4 October. Caldas then resigned on 11 November 2019 following a 7–2 defeat to Ararat-Armenia.

On 21 February 2020, the Football Federation of Armenia announced that FC Yerevan had withdrawn from the 2019–20 Armenian Premier League due to financial and technical problems.

=== League and cup ===
Season	League										National Cup	Top goalscorer	
Season	Div.	Pos.	Pl.	W	D	L	GS	GA	GD	P	National Cup	Name	League
1995–96	Armenian Premier League	3	22	13	5	4	43	24	+19	44	Quarter-final	(Armenia) Tigran Yesayan	20
1996–97	Armenian Premier League	3	22	16	2	4	58	24	+34	50	Semi-final	(Armenia) Tigran Yesayan	11
1997	Armenian Premier League	1	18	13	4	1	41	10	+31	43	not held	(Armenia) Tigran Yesayan	10
1998	Armenian Premier League	3	26	15	3	8	47	30	+17	48	Semi-final	(Armenia) Tigran Yesayan	10
1999	Armenian Premier League	5	32	15	6	11	60	43	+17	51	Quarter-final	(Armenia) Varazdat Avetisyan	12
2000–2018	No participation												
2018–19	Armenian First League	2	33	22	4	7	112	46	+66	70	Round of 16	(Russia) Stanislav Yefimov	46
2019-20	Armenian Premier League	10	18	0	0	18	11	62	-51	0	Second round	(Russia) Ramazan Isayev	6
2020–present	No participation												

Indicates Winning the Division Title

=== European record ===
As of August 15, 2018

Competition	Pld	W	D	L	GF	GA	GD
UEFA Champions League	2	0	0	2	0	5	−5
UEFA Europa League	4	0	0	4	2	12	−10
**Total**	**6**	**0**	**0**	**6**	**2**	**17**	**–15**

Season	Competition	Round	Opponent	1st leg	2nd leg	Aggregate
1997–98	UEFA Cup	1Q	(Ukraine) Dnipro	1–6	**0–2**	**1–8**
1998–99	UEFA Champions League	1Q	(Finland) HJK Helsinki	0–2	**0–3**	**0–5**
1999–00	UEFA Cup	QR	(Israel) Hapoel Tel Aviv	**0–2**	1–2	**1–4**

- Home results are noted in **bold**

== Current squad ==
As of 31 August 2019

Note: Flags indicate national team as defined under FIFA eligibility rules; some limited exceptions apply. Players may hold more than one non-FIFA nationality.

No.	Pos.	Nation	Player
1	GK	(Latvia) LVA	Jānis Krūmiņš
2	DF	(Brazil) BRA	William Gustavo
3	DF	(Armenia) ARM	Aghavard Petrosyan
4	DF	(Russia) RUS	Maksim Evstigneev
5	DF	(Armenia) ARM	Argishti Petrosyan
6	MF	(Armenia) ARM	Aram Hovsepyan
7	FW	(Armenia) ARM	Abraham Portugalyan
8	MF	(Russia) RUS	Yvgeny Yevgenyev (captain)
10	FW	(Armenia) ARM	Edgar Mkrtchyan
11	MF	(Armenia) ARM	Levon Badalyan
12	DF	(Russia) RUS	Denis Lyubimov
14	FW	(Brazil) BRA	Jeferson Cruz
17	MF	(Armenia) ARM	Roman Zavialov

No.	Pos.	Nation	Player
18	FW	(Armenia) ARM	Vahe Movsisyan
19	DF	(Ukraine) UKR	Sviatoslav Hrabchak
20	MF	(Iran) IRN	Armin Mir Doraghi
21	MF	(Democratic Republic of the Congo) COD	Antonio Lokwa
22	MF	(North Macedonia) MKD	Adrien Ibraimi
23	MF	(Brazil) BRA	Elias
25	MF	(Senegal) SEN	Pape Demba Dieye
27	FW	(Armenia) ARM	Gegham Tumbaryan
30	MF	(Ukraine) UKR	Dmytro Klimakov
31	FW	(Colombia) COL	Jafett Del Portillo Bolaño
33	FW	(Armenia) ARM	Viulen Ayvazyan
99	GK	(Armenia) ARM	Grigor Makaryan
—	DF	(Armenia) ARM	Ivan Mamakhanov

== Honours ==
- Armenian Premier League
  - Champions (1): 1997

== Club records ==
Most Caps
#	Player	Caps
1	Tigran Yesayan	89
2	Arkadi Dokhoyan	86
3	Albert Achemyan	78
4	Karen Dokhoyan	78
5	Armen Markosyan	74
6	Karen Grigoryan	74
7	Armen Karapetyan	69
8	Armen Petikyan	62
9	Yervand Krbashyan	50
10	Arsen Ayvasyan	47

Top Goalscorers
#	Player	Goals
1	Tigran Yesayan	56
2	Armen Karapetyan	30
3	Albert Achemyan	15
4	Varazdat Avetisyan	13
5	Karen Dokhoyan	12
6	Armen Markosyan	9
7	Mallal N'Diaye	8
8	Dede Tamboura	7
9	Kakha Gogoladze	7
10	Armen Sahakyan	7

== Personnel ==
- Owner/President: Karen Harutyunyan
- Chief Executive Officer: Arman Harutyunyan
- Press Secretary: Norayr Harutyunyan
- Sporting director: Samvel Sargsyan
- Head coach: Nebojša Petrović
- Assistant coach: Georgi Ghazaryan
- Goalkeepers Coach: Martik Mkrtumyan

== Managers ==
- (Armenia) Gagik Tatevosyan, 1995
- (Armenia) Vagarshak Aslanyan, 1995
- (Armenia) Samvel Darbinyan, 1995–1996
- (Armenia) Samvel Petrosyan, 1996–1997
- (Armenia) Samvel Darbinyan, 1997
- (Armenia) Ashot Khachatryan, 1997–1998
- (Armenia) Samvel Darbinyan, 1998–1999
- (Armenia) Aramais Tonoyan, 1999
- (Armenia) Samvel Sargsyan, 2018–2019
- (Ukraine) Eduard Pavlov, 2019

Name	Nat.	From	To	P	W	D	L	GS	GA	%W	Honours	Notes
Nebojša Petrović	Serbia	1 July 2019	5 September 2019	5	0	0	5	3	10	0.00		
Georgi Ghazaryan (Caretaker)	Armenia	5 September 2019	16 September 2019	1	0	0	1	0	1	0.00		
Vlad Goian	Moldova	16 September 2019	4 October 2019	3	0	0	3	1	8	0.00		
António Caldas	Portugal	4 October 2019	11 November 2019	4	0	0	4	5	17	0.00		
