= 2018–19 FC Pyunik season =

Pyunik
2018-19 season
- Chairman: Rafik Hayrapetyan
- Manager: Andrei Talalayev (Until 9 April, Banned on 6 December); Aleksandr Tarkhanov (from 11 April)
- Stadium: Vazgen Sargsyan Republican Stadium
- Armenian Premier League: 2st
- Armenian Cup: Quarterfinal vs Lori
- Europa League: Third Qualifying Round vs Maccabi Tel Aviv
- Top goalscorer: League: Erik Vardanyan (8); All: Two Players (8)

The 2018–19 season was Pyunik's 25th season in the Armenian Premier League.

== Season events ==
On 2 December, during Pyunik's match against Gandzasar Kapan, manager Andrei Talalayev was sent off for insulting the Fourth official. Talalayev was subsequently banned from football until the end of the season, 31 May 2019, on 6 December 2018. On 9 April, Talalayev left Pyunik by mutual consent, with Aleksandr Tarkhanov being appointed as the new manager on 11 April.

== Squad ==
As of 2 April 2019

Note: Flags indicate national team as defined under FIFA eligibility rules; some limited exceptions apply. Players may hold more than one non-FIFA nationality.

No.	Pos.	Nation	Player
1	GK	ARM	Gor Manukyan
2	DF	ARM	Serob Grigoryan
3	DF	ARM	Artur Kartashyan
5	DF	ARM	Armen Manucharyan
6	MF	ARM	Karlen Mkrtchyan (captain)
8	MF	ARM	Rumyan Hovsepyan
9	FW	ARM	Artur Miranyan
10	MF	ARM	Erik Vardanyan
11	FW	CIV	Mohamed Konaté
12	GK	ARM	Sevak Aslanyan
13	FW	RUS	Denis Dorozhkin
15	MF	UKR	Maksym Trusevych
16	DF	ARM	Robert Hakobyan
17	MF	ARM	Hovhannes Poghosyan

No.	Pos.	Nation	Player
18	MF	ARM	Alik Arakelyan
19	MF	RUS	Denis Talalay
21	DF	RUS	Vitali Stezhko (on loan from Krasnodar)
23	MF	NGR	Mohammed Usman
25	GK	MNE	Andrija Dragojević
26	MF	ARM	Hovhannes Ilangyozyan
27	DF	RUS	Vyacheslav Dmitriev
30	MF	ARM	Vahagn Hayrapetyan
31	GK	RUS	Yevgeni Kobozev
33	FW	CIV	Lassina Dao
63	DF	ALB	Kristi Marku
66	DF	RUS	Maksim Zhestokov
67	DF	RUS	Sergei Kolychev
70	DF	UKR	Serhiy Shevchuk (on loan from Tambov)

== Transfers ==
=== In ===
Date	Position	Nationality	Name	From	Fee	Ref.
Summer 2018	DF	(Russia)	Vyacheslav Dmitriyev		Free	
Summer 2018	DF	(Russia)	Sergei Kolychev	Rotor Volgograd	Undisclosed	
Summer 2018	MF	(Russia)	Albert Bogatyryov	Tyumen	Undisclosed	
Summer 2018	MF	(Russia)	Denis Voynov	Avangard Kursk	Undisclosed	
Summer 2018	FW	(Armenia)	Ruslan Koryan	SKA-Khabarovsk	Undisclosed	
24 June 2018	GK	(Montenegro)	Andrija Dragojević	Alashkert	Undisclosed	
24 June 2018	GK	(Russia)	Yevgeni Kobozev	Zorky Krasnogorsk	Undisclosed	
24 June 2018	DF	(Russia)	Maksim Zhestokov	Shinnik Yaroslavl	Undisclosed	
24 June 2018	MF	(Ukraine)	Maksym Trusevych	Tambov	Undisclosed	
24 June 2018	FW	(Ivory Coast)	Mohamed Konaté	Gomel	Undisclosed	
24 July 2018	MF	(Armenia)	Rumyan Hovsepyan	Banants	Undisclosed	
Winter 2019	FW	(Armenia)	Artur Miranyan		Free	
22 January 2019	DF	(Albania)	Kristi Marku	KF Ferizaj	Undisclosed	
17 February 2019	MF	(Russia)	Denis Talalay	Khimki	Undisclosed	
21 February 2019	MF	(Nigeria)	Mohammed Usman	Sarpsborg 08	Undisclosed	
2 April 2019	FW	(Ivory Coast)	Lassina Dao		Free	

=== Loans in ===
Date from	Position	Nationality	Name	From	Date to	Ref.
Summer 2018	DF	(Russia)	Vitali Stezhko	Krasnodar	End of Season	
9 January 2019	DF	(Ukraine)	Serhiy Shevchuk	Tambov	End of Season	

=== Out ===
Date	Position	Nationality	Name	To	Fee	Ref.
Summer 2018	GK	(Ukraine)	Valeriy Voskonyan	MFC Mykolaiv	Undisclosed	
Summer 2018	DF	(Armenia)	Levon Hayrapetyan	Artsakh	Undisclosed	
Summer 2018	DF	(Ivory Coast)	Didier Kadio	SJK	Undisclosed	
Summer 2018	MF	(Russia)	Marat Burayev	Artsakh	Undisclosed	
Winter 2019	DF	(Armenia)	Petros Avetisyan	Ararat-Armenia	Undisclosed	

=== Released ===
Date	Position	Nationality	Name	Joined	Date
Summer 2018	GK	(Armenia)	Gor Manukyan		
Summer 2018	MF	(Nigeria)	Marshal Johnson	Akwa United	
3 August 2018	FW	(Ivory Coast)	Drissa Diarrassouba	Gandzasar Kapan	11 August 2018
3 August 2018	DF	(Guinea-Bissau)	Bacar Baldé	Gandzasar Kapan	11 August 2018
Winter 2019	GK	(Armenia)	Valeriy Voskonyan		
Winter 2019	DF	(Armenia)	Edmon Movsisyan		
Winter 2019	MF	(Russia)	Albert Bogatyryov	SKA Rostov-on-Don	
Winter 2019	MF	(Russia)	Denis Voynov	Murom	
Winter 2019	FW	(Armenia)	Ruslan Koryan	Istiklol	
Winter 2019	FW	(Armenia)	Robert Minasyan		

== Friendlies ==
26 January 2019	Pyunik (Armenia)	2 – 1	(Bulgaria) Montana	Alanya, Turkey
(UTC+4)	Trialist; Arakelyan	Report	Goal

26 January 2019	Pyunik (Armenia)	1 – 0	(Bulgaria) Slavia Sofia	Alanya, Turkey
(UTC+4)	H.Poghosyan	Report

1 February 2019	Pyunik (Armenia)	1 – 4	(Romania) Universitatea Cluj	Alanya, Turkey
(UTC+4)	Trialist	Report	Goal

1 February 2019	Pyunik (Armenia)	0 – 2	(Ukraine) Oleksandriya	Alanya, Turkey
(UTC+4)		Report	Goal

=== FNL Cup ===
==== Group stage ====
Team	Pld	W	D	L	GF	GA	GD	Pts
(Russia) Rotor Volgograd	3	3	0	0	6	2	+4	9
(Russia) Mordovia Saransk	3	1	1	1	4	4	0	4
(Armenia) FC Pyunik	3	0	2	1	2	3	−1	2
(Russia) FC Murom	3	0	1	2	3	6	−3	1

8 February 2019 1	Murom (Russia)	1 – 1	(Armenia) Pyunik	Paphos, Cyprus
11:00 (UTC+4)	Voynov (yellow card) 3'; Karpukhin 46'; Pashtov (yellow card) 67'	Report	Arakelyan 9'; Trusevych (yellow card) 21' (yellow-red card) 83'; Miranyan (yellow card) 46'; Talalay (yellow card) 63'	Stadium: Eroskipu Stadium; Attendance: 150; Referee: Anton Anopa

11 February 2019 2	Pyunik (Armenia)	1 – 1	(Russia) Mordovia Saransk	Paphos, Cyprus
13:45 (UTC+4)	Arakelyan (penalty missed) 22' 23'	Report	Kireyev (yellow card) 17'; Lebedev (yellow card) 22'; Rusl.Mukhametshin 33'; Navlyotov (yellow card) 46'; Adayev (yellow card) 80'	Stadium: Eroskipu Stadium; Referee: Vladimir Seldyakov

14 February 2019 3	Rotor Volgograd (Russia)	1 – 0	(Armenia) Pyunik	Kouklia, Cyprus
13:45 (UTC+4)	Mullin 24'; Sanaya (yellow card) 77'	Report	Talalay (yellow card) 58'; Marku (yellow card) 65'	Stadium: Kouklia Community Stadium; Attendance: 200; Referee: Yevgeny Bulanov

==== Knouckout Stages ====
17 February 2019 9-12 Semifinal	Pyunik (Armenia)	1 – 4	(Latvia) Riga	Kouklia, Cyprus
13:45 (UTC+4)	Stezhko (yellow card) 25'; Talalay (yellow card) 30' (yellow-red card) 66'; Miranyan 41'; Trusevych (yellow card) 45'; Shevchuk (yellow card) 86'	Report	Višņakovs (yellow card) 32' (goal) 72'; Panić 48'; Karašausks 76', 77'	Stadium: Kouklia Community Stadium; Referee: Artem Petrenko

21 February 2019 11-12 Semifinal	Pyunik (Armenia)	2 – 2 (2 – 3 p)	(Russia) Krasnodar-2	Paphos, Cyprus
16:30 (UTC+4)	Miranyan 17'; Stezhko 26'; Marku (yellow card) 28'; H.Muradyan (yellow card) 72'; Hovsepyan (yellow card) 78'	Report	Stezhko 4' (o.g.); Adamov (yellow card) 16'; Bochko (yellow card) 32' (yellow-red card) 41'; Onugkha 35'; Tekuchyov (yellow card) 75'	Stadium: Euroskipu; Referee: Vera Opeykina
	Penalties
	Hovsepyan (penalty scored); H.Ilangyozyan (penalty missed); Talalay (penalty scored); Mkrtchyan (penalty missed); H.Muradyan (penalty missed)		Utkin (penalty scored); Sabua (penalty scored); M.Kolomytsev (penalty scored); Tekuchev (penalty missed)

== Competitions ==
=== Overall record ===
Competition	First match	Last match	Starting round	Final position	Record							
Competition	First match	Last match	Starting round	Final position	Pld	W	D	L	GF	GA	GD	Win %
Premier League	5 August 2018	26 May 2019	Matchday 1	2nd	32	18	6	8	46	32	+14	56.25
Armenian Cup	25 October 2018	8 November 2018	Quarterfinal	Quarterfinal	2	0	1	1	1	3	−2	0.00
UEFA Europa League	12 July 2018	16 August 2018	First qualifying round	Third qualifying round	6	3	1	2	6	4	+2	50.00
Total					40	21	8	11	53	39	+14	52.50

Last updated: 26 May 2019
Source: Competitions

=== Premier League ===
==== Results ====
5 August 2018 1	Pyunik	–	Gandzasar Kapan	Yerevan
(UTC+4)				Stadium: Vazgen Sargsyan Republican Stadium

12 August 2018 2	Alashkert	–	Pyunik	Yerevan
(UTC+4)				Stadium: Alashkert Stadium

19 August 2018 3	Pyunik	3 – 1	Ararat-Armenia	Yerevan
21:30 (UTC+4)	R.Minasyan (red card) 38'; H.Ilangyozyan 45'; Stezhko 58'; Konaté 85'; Kobozev (yellow card) 90'	Report	Dimitrov 39' (pen.); Mkoyan (yellow card) 77'; Ambartsumyan (yellow card) 87'; Malakyan (yellow card) 90+1'	Stadium: Vazgen Sargsyan Republican Stadium; Attendance: 300; Referee: Zaven Hovhannisyan

22 August 2018 4	Shirak	1 – 2	Pyunik	Gyumri
17:00 (UTC+4)	Arreola 2'; Z.Margaryan (yellow card) 21'	Report	R.Hakobyan (yellow card) 16'; Vardanyan 46'; Konaté 64'; Kolychev (yellow card) 90+3'	Stadium: Gyumri City Stadium; Attendance: 700; Referee: Artur Safaryan

26 August 2018 5	Pyunik	2 – 0	Artsakh	Yerevan
19:00 (UTC+4)	Hovsepyan 35' (pen.); Vardanyan 58' (yellow card) 59'; Manucharyan (yellow card) 61'; Kolychev (yellow card) 81'	Report	H.Asoyan (yellow card) 35'; K.Harutyunyan (yellow card) 40'; V.Poghosyan (yellow card) 62'	Stadium: Vazgen Sargsyan Republican Stadium; Attendance: 400; Referee: Henrik Nalbandyan

29 August 2018 6	Banants	4 – 2	Pyunik	Yerevan
16:00 (UTC+4)	Stezhko 46' (o.g.); A.Bareghamyan (yellow card) 65'; Stanojević 71'; V.Ayvazyan 79'; Wal 83'	Report	Konaté 27'; R.Hakobyan (yellow card) 44'; Vardanyan 66' (pen.); A.Kartashyan (yellow card) 82'; Hovsepyan (yellow card) 85'; Manucharyan (yellow card) 90+3'	Stadium: Banants Stadium; Attendance: 600; Referee: Artur Simonyan

1 September 2018 7	Pyunik	0 – 3	Lori	Yerevan
16:00 (UTC+4)	Trusevych (yellow card) 50'; Kolychev (yellow card) 65'	Report	I.Aliyu 3', 27'; Ingbede 6'	Stadium: Vazgen Sargsyan Republican Stadium; Attendance: 500; Referee: Zaven Hovhannisyan

16 September 2018 8	Ararat Yerevan	1 – 3	Pyunik	Yerevan
14:00 (UTC+4)	Malyaka (yellow card) 6' (goal) 38' (pen.); R.Safaryan (yellow card) 86'; Azin (yellow card) 88'	Report	Avetisyan 7'; Voynov (yellow card) 7' (goal) 51'; Trusevych 34'; Dmitriyev (yellow card) 83'	Stadium: Alashkert Stadium; Attendance: 200; Referee: Ashot Ghaltakchyan

19 September 2018 2	Alashkert	1 – 2	Pyunik	Yerevan
15:00 (UTC+4)	Grigoryan (yellow card) 19' (yellow-red card) 72'; Yedigaryan (yellow card) 43'; Poghosyan 63' (pen.) (yellow card) 81'; Voskanyan (yellow card) 84'	Report	Stezhko (yellow card) 7' (yellow-red card) 45+1'; Avetisyan 16' (yellow card) 82'; Zhestokov 74'; Dragojević (yellow card) 90+4'	Stadium: Alashkert Stadium; Attendance: 400; Referee: Zaven Hovhannisyan

30 September 2018 9	Gandzasar Kapan	1 – 2	Pyunik	Yerevan
18:00 (UTC+4)	D.Terteryan (yellow card) 31'; Yuspashyan (yellow card) 36'; A.Hovhannisyan (yellow card) 60'; Aslanyan (yellow card) 74'; M.Manasyan 90+2'	Report	Voynov (yellow card) 45+1'; V.Hayrapetyan (yellow card) 49'; V.Begoyan (yellow card) 66'; Koryan 72'; Zhestokov 86'	Stadium: Football Academy Stadium; Attendance: 500; Referee: Artur Simonyan

3 October 2018 1	Pyunik	0 – 1	Gandzasar Kapan	Yerevan
19:00 (UTC+4)	V.Hayrapetyan (yellow card) 22' (yellow-red card) 68'; Kolychev (yellow card) 53'; R.Hakobyan (yellow card) 61'; Dragojević (yellow card) 90+3'	Report	G.Nranyan (yellow card) 26'; Diarrassouba 48'; Musonda (yellow card) 53'; A.Hovhannisyan (yellow card) 57'; M.Manasyan (yellow card) 68'; A.Karapetyan (red card) 72'; V.Minasyan (yellow card) 90'	Stadium: Vazgen Sargsyan Republican Stadium; Attendance: 300; Referee: Suren Baliyan

7 October 2018 10	Pyunik	0 – 1	Alashkert	Yerevan
18:00 (UTC+4)	Zhestokov (yellow card) 1'; Grigoryan (yellow card) 67'	Report	Dashyan 62'; Sekulić (yellow card) 88'	Stadium: Vazgen Sargsyan Republican Stadium; Attendance: 500; Referee: Zaven Hovhannisyan

21 October 2018 11	Ararat-Armenia	0 – 0	Pyunik	Yerevan
18:00 (UTC+4)	Pashov (yellow card) 24'; Pustozyorov (yellow card) 62'	Report	Dorozhkin (yellow card) 5'; A.Kartashyan (yellow card) 78'; Stezhko (yellow card) 90+2'	Stadium: Yerevan Football Academy Stadium; Attendance: 500; Referee: Artur Simonyan

28 October 2018 12	Pyunik	1 – 1	Shirak	Yerevan
18:00 (UTC+4)	A.Arakelyan (yellow card) 34'; Dmitriyev (yellow card) 62'; Kolychev (yellow card) 70'; Zhestokov 90+2'	Report	M.Bakayoko 15'	Stadium: Vazgen Sargsyan Republican Stadium; Attendance: 150; Referee: Gevorg Eghoyan

31 October 2018 13	Artsakh	0 – 0	Pyunik	Yerevan
14:00 (UTC+4)	H.Nazaryan (yellow card) 37'; K.Harutyunyan (yellow card) 88'	Report		Stadium: Mika Stadium; Attendance: 300; Referee: Zaven Hovhannisyan

4 November 2018 14	Pyunik	2 – 0	Banants	Yerevan
14:00 (UTC+4)	A.Arakelyan 7', 84'	Report	V.Ayvazyan (yellow card) 49'	Stadium: Vazgen Sargsyan Republican Stadium; Attendance: 700; Referee: Gevorg Eghoyan

11 November 2018 15	Lori	0 – 1	Pyunik	Vanadzor
14:00 (UTC+4)	U.Iwu (yellow card) 65'; I.Aliyu (yellow card) 65'; S.Adjuman (yellow card) 67'; I.Fuseini (yellow card) 76'	Report	Hovsepyan 58' (yellow card) 65'; A.Arakelyan (yellow card) 65'; V.Hayrapetyan (yellow card) 65'; Dmitriyev (yellow card) 78'; A.Kartashyan (yellow card) 90+1'	Stadium: Vanadzor Football Academy; Attendance: 600; Referee: Gevorg Eghoyan

25 November 2018 16	Pyunik	0 – 1	Ararat Yerevan	Yerevan
15:00 (UTC+4)	V.Hayrapetyan (yellow card) 73'; R.Hakobyan (yellow card) 82'	Report	O.Hambardzumyan (yellow card) 35'; Badoyan (yellow card) 57'; A.Kocharyan 82'	Stadium: Vazgen Sargsyan Republican Stadium; Attendance: 500; Referee: Suren Baliyan

2 December 2018 17	Pyunik	1 – 3	Gandzasar Kapan	Yerevan
14:00 (UTC+4)	Dragojević (yellow card) 16'; Trusevych (yellow card) 67'; Manucharyan (yellow card) 77'; Vardanyan 89' (pen.)	Report	M.Manasyan 17' (pen.); Junior (yellow card) 19'; D.Terteryan (yellow card) 57'; G.Ohanyan 69'; Musonda 72'	Stadium: Vazgen Sargsyan Republican Stadium; Attendance: 150; Referee: Zaven Hovhannisyan

2 March 2019 18	Alashkert	1 – 2	Pyunik	Yerevan
14:00 (UTC+4)	Stojković (yellow card) 31'; Stezhko 65' (o.g.); Arta.Yedigaryan (yellow card) 76'; Prudnikov (yellow card) 77'	Report	Miranyan 3'; Usman (yellow card) 33'; Trusevych (yellow card) 41'; Talalay 51'; Vardanyan (yellow card) 90+1'	Stadium: Alashkert Stadium; Attendance: 500; Referee: Suren Baliyan

6 March 2019 19	Pyunik	0 – 3	Ararat-Armenia	Yerevan
14:00 (UTC+4)	Stezhko (yellow card) 31'; Marku (yellow card) 71'; Zhestokov (yellow card) 79'	Report	Pashov 12'; Martínez 26'; Kobyalko 65'	Stadium: Pyunik Training Centre; Attendance: 300

10 March 2019 20	Shirak	0 – 2	Pyunik	Gyumri
15:00 (UTC+4)	Prljević (yellow card) 73'	Report	Miranyan (yellow card) 75'; Vardanyan 78'; Trusevych (yellow card) 86'; Shevchuk 87'	Stadium: Gyumri City Stadium; Attendance: 300; Referee: Gevorg Eghoyan

16 March 2019 21	Pyunik	1 – 0	Artsakh	Yerevan
14:00 (UTC+4)	Mkrtchyan (yellow card) 19'; Konaté 29'; Shevchuk (yellow card) 32'; Marku (yellow card) 45+2'	Report	D.Klimakov (yellow card) 34'; A.Petrosyan (yellow card) 54'	Stadium: Pyunik Training Centre; Attendance: 190; Referee: Ashot Ghaltakchyan

31 March 2019 22	Banants	1 – 1	Pyunik	Yerevan
14:00 (UTC+4)	V.Ayvazyan 2'; W.Cagro (yellow card) 54'; Gadzhibekov (yellow card) 90+4'	Report	Talalay (yellow card) 49'; Marku (yellow card) 64'; Hovsepyan 90+2'	Stadium: Banants Stadium; Attendance: 300; Referee: Gevorg Eghoyan

7 April 2019 23	Pyunik	1 – 2	Lori	Yerevan
15:00 (UTC+4)	Usman (yellow card) 43'; Hovsepyan 75' (pen.); Marku (yellow card) 79'	Report	Ingbede 29'; Désiré 56'; Siukayev (yellow card) 90+2'	Stadium: Vazgen Sargsyan Republican Stadium; Attendance: 700; Referee: Suren Baliyan

11 April 2019 24	Ararat Yerevan	1 – 2	Pyunik	Yerevan
15:00 (UTC+4)	R.Avagyan (yellow card) 67'; Simonyan 77'	Report	Trusevych (yellow card) 10'; Zhestokov (yellow card) 73'; Usman 83'; Vardanyan 88'	Stadium: Banants-3; Attendance: 200; Referee: Henrik Nalbandyan

20 April 2019 25	Gandzasar Kapan	0 – 1	Pyunik	Yerevan
14:00 (UTC+4)	G.Nranyan (yellow card) 22'; V.Minasyan (yellow card) 30'; Meliksetyan (red card) 85'	Report	R.Hakobyan (yellow card) 19'; Stezhko (yellow card) 45'; Hovsepyan (yellow card) 90+3'; Dao 90+4'	Stadium: Football Academy Stadium; Attendance: 300; Referee: Artur Safaryan

27 April 2019 26	Pyunik	1 – 0	Alashkert	Vagharshapat
14:00 (UTC+4)	Marku (yellow card) 64'; Grigoryan 78' (o.g.)	Report	Stojković (yellow card) 74'	Stadium: Fut Akademia; Attendance: 300; Referee: Zaven Hovhannisyan

1 May 2019 27	Ararat-Armenia	1 – 4	Pyunik	Yerevan
15:00 (UTC+4)	Khozin (yellow card) 47'; Kódjo (yellow card) 49'; Kobyalko 69' (pen.); Malakyan (yellow card) 77'	Report	Usman 48'; Miranyan 50'; Vardanyan 68'; Talalay 86'	Stadium: Vazgen Sargsyan Republican Stadium; Attendance: 300; Referee: Artur Simonyan

5 May 2019 28	Pyunik	2 – 0	Shirak	Vagharshapat
16:00 (UTC+4)	Zhestokov 5'; Dao (yellow card) 48'; Mkrtchyan (yellow card) 68'; Marku (yellow card) 83'; Miranyan 89'	Report	A.Muradyan (yellow card) 43'	Stadium: Fut Akademia; Attendance: 300; Referee: Henrik Nalbandyan

10 May 2019 29	Artsakh	0 – 3	Pyunik	Yerevan
16:00 (UTC+4)		Report	Marku 10'; Zhestokov 23'; Konaté 39'	Stadium: Alashkert Stadium; Attendance: 300; Referee: Suren Baliyan

15 May 2019 30	Pyunik	1 – 1	Banants	Yerevan
17:00 (UTC+4)	Marku (yellow card) 22'; Miranyan 47'; Grigoryan (yellow card) 87'; Mkrtchyan (yellow card) 90'	Report	Darbinyan (yellow card) 26' (yellow-red card) 86'; K.Melkonyan (yellow card) 45' (goal) 55'; Kpodo (yellow card) 88'	Stadium: Yerevan Football Academy Stadium; Attendance: 300; Referee: Zaven Hovhannisyan

20 May 2019 31	Lori	2 – 2	Pyunik	Vanadzor
15:00 (UTC+4)	Désiré 51', 82'	Report	Hovsepyan (yellow card) 15'; Vardanyan 49'; Konaté 70'; Stezhko (yellow card) 73'; Usman (yellow card) 90+7'	Stadium: Vanadzor Football Academy; Attendance: 200; Referee: Artak Simonyan

26 May 2019 32	Pyunik	2 – 1	Ararat Yerevan	Yerevan
17:00 (UTC+4)	Mkrtchyan 33'; Miranyan 39'; Trusevych (yellow card) 88'	Report	V.Arzoyan (yellow card) 26'; Badoyan 43'; M.Guyganov (yellow card) 51'	Stadium: Yerevan Football Academy Stadium; Attendance: 600; Referee: Antonio Mateu Lahoz

==== Table ====
Pos	Team	Pld	W	D	L	GF	GA	GD	Pts	Qualification or relegation
1	Ararat-Armenia (C)	32	18	7	7	53	28	+25	61	Qualification for the Champions League first qualifying round
2	Pyunik	32	18	6	8	46	32	+14	60	Qualification for the Europa League first qualifying round (Note: Alashkert qualified for the Europa League first qualifying round by winning the 2018–19 Armenian Cup.)
3	Banants	32	14	10	8	43	35	+8	52	Qualification for the Europa League first qualifying round
4	Alashkert	32	15	6	11	37	27	+10	51	Qualification for the Europa League first qualifying round
5	Lori	32	11	11	10	42	40	+2	44	
6	Gandzasar	32	10	8	14	38	33	+5	38	
7	Shirak	32	7	15	10	26	30	−4	36	
8	Artsakh	32	6	10	16	25	49	−24	28	
9	Ararat Yerevan	32	5	7	20	24	60	−36	22	

Source: Soccerway
Rules for classification: 1) Points; 2) Play-off (only if deciding champion); 3) Matches won; 4) Head-to-head points; 5) Head-to-head matches won; 6) Head-to-head goal difference; 7) Head-to-head goals scored; 8) Head-to-head away goals scored; 9) Goal difference; 10) Goals scored.
(C) Champions

=== Armenian Cup ===
25 October 2018 Quarterfinal 1st leg	Pyunik	0 – 2	Lori	Yerevan
18:00 (UTC+4)	Kolychev (yellow card) 11'; R.Hakobyan (yellow card) 30'; Trusevych (yellow card) 45'; Stezhko (yellow card) 54'	Report	U.Iwu 12'; A.Azatyan (yellow card) 22'; Ingbede 83'	Stadium: Vazgen Sargsyan Republican Stadium; Attendance: 300; Referee: Zaven Hovhannisyan

8 November 2018 Quarterfinal 2nd leg	Lori	1 – 1 (3 – 1 agg.)	Pyunik	Vanadzor
14:00 (UTC+4)	S.Harutyunyan (yellow card) 87'; Konov (yellow card) 90+2'; U.Iwu 90+4'	Report	R.Minasyan (yellow card) 33'; A.Arakelyan 40'; A.Kartashyan (yellow card) 73'	Stadium: Vanadzor Football Academy; Attendance: 400; Referee: Suren Baliyan

=== UEFA Europa League ===
==== Qualifying rounds ====
12 July 2018 First qualifying round 1st leg	Pyunik (Armenia)	1 – 0	(North Macedonia) Vardar	Yerevan, Armenia
18:00 (UTC+4)	Konaté 28'; Grigoryan (yellow card) 56'; Avetisyan (yellow card) 73'; R.Hakobyan (yellow card) 80'	Report	Bitang (yellow card) 23'; Barseghyan (yellow card) 54'	Stadium: Vazgen Sargsyan Republican Stadium; Attendance: 2,000; Referee: Michal Ocenáš (Slovakia)
Note: Pyunik played their home matches at Vazgen Sargsyan Republican Stadium, Yerevan, instead of their regular stadium Pyunik Stadium, Yerevan

19 July 2018 First qualifying round 2nd leg	Vardar (North Macedonia)	0 – 2 (0 – 3 agg.)	(Armenia) Pyunik	Skopje, Macedonia
21:00 (UTC+4)	Barseghyan (yellow card) 14'	Report	Grigoryan (yellow card) 9'; Stezhko (yellow card) 72'; Balde 85', 89'	Stadium: Philip II Arena; Attendance: 5,823; Referee: Ian McNabb (Northern Ireland)

26 July 2018 Second qualifying round 1st leg	Tobol (Kazakhstan)	2 – 1	(Armenia) Pyunik	Kostanay, Kazakhstan
19:00 (UTC+4)	Fedin 49'; Nurgaliev 80'	Report	V.Hayrapetyan (yellow card) 20'; Koryan 90'	Stadium: Central Stadium; Attendance: 7,700; Referee: Juri Frischer (Estonia)

31 July 2018 Second qualifying round 2nd leg	Pyunik (Armenia)	1 – 0 ((a) 2 – 2 agg.)	(Kazakhstan) Tobol	Yerevan, Armenia
20:00 (UTC+4)	Trusevych (yellow card) 24'; Avetisyan (yellow card) 66' (yellow-red card) 89'; Konaté 82' (yellow card) 90+1'	Report	Nurgaliev (yellow card) 39'; Žulpa (yellow card) 50'; Nusserbayev (yellow card) 90'	Stadium: Vazgen Sargsyan Republican Stadium; Attendance: 8,000; Referee: Petr Ardeleanu (Czech Republic)
Note: Pyunik played their home matches at Vazgen Sargsyan Republican Stadium, Yerevan, instead of their regular stadium Pyunik Stadium, Yerevan

7 August 2018 Third qualifying round 1st leg	Pyunik (Armenia)	0 – 0	(Israel) Maccabi Tel Aviv	Yerevan, Armenia
20:00 (UTC+4)	Trusevych (yellow card) 48'	Report	Glazer (yellow card) 16'; Jair (yellow card) 56'	Stadium: Vazgen Sargsyan Republican Stadium; Attendance: 12,500; Referee: Pol van Boekel (Netherlands)
Note: Pyunik played their home matches at Vazgen Sargsyan Republican Stadium, Yerevan, instead of their regular stadium Pyunik Stadium, Yerevan

16 August 2018 Third qualifying round 2nd leg	Maccabi Tel Aviv (Israel)	2 – 1 (2 – 1 agg.)	(Armenia) Pyunik	Netanya, Israel
21:30 (UTC+4)	Shechter (yellow card) 52'; Micha 55'; Atar 68'	Report	Voynov 11'; A.Arakelyan (yellow card) 33'; Grigoryan (yellow card) 44'; Konaté (yellow card) 57'; Hovsepyan (yellow card) 77'	Stadium: Netanya Stadium; Referee: Ville Nevalainen (Finland)
Note: Maccabi Tel Aviv play their home matches at Netanya Stadium, Netanya, instead of their regular stadium Bloomfield Stadium, Tel Aviv, due to renovation.

== Statistics ==
As of match played 26 May 2019

=== Appearances and goals ===
No.	Pos	Nat	Player	Total		Premier League		Armenian Cup		UEFA Europa League	
No.	Pos	Nat	Player	Apps	Goals	Apps	Goals	Apps	Goals	Apps	Goals
2	DF	(Armenia) ARM	Serob Grigoryan	16	0	8+1	0	1	0	6	0
3	DF	(Armenia) ARM	Artur Kartashyan	10	0	5+4	0	1	0	0	0
5	DF	(Armenia) ARM	Armen Manucharyan	20	0	16+3	0	1	0	0	0
6	MF	(Armenia) ARM	Karlen Mkrtchyan	25	1	13+9	1	1+1	0	0+1	0
8	MF	(Armenia) ARM	Rumyan Hovsepyan	32	4	19+8	4	0+1	0	3+1	0
9	FW	(Armenia) ARM	Artur Miranyan	15	5	15	5	0	0	0	0
10	MF	(Armenia) ARM	Erik Vardanyan	21	8	10+11	8	0	0	0	0
11	FW	(Ivory Coast) CIV	Mohamed Konaté	22	8	7+8	6	0+1	0	5+1	2
13	FW	(Russia) RUS	Denis Dorozhkin	19	0	11+6	0	1+1	0	0	0
15	MF	(Ukraine) UKR	Maksym Trusevych	29	1	20+2	1	1	0	6	0
16	DF	(Armenia) ARM	Robert Hakobyan	19	0	14+3	0	1	0	0+1	0
18	MF	(Armenia) ARM	Alik Arakelyan	31	3	22+1	2	2	1	5+1	0
19	MF	(Russia) RUS	Denis Talalay	14	2	12+2	2	0	0	0	0
21	DF	(Russia) RUS	Vitali Stezhko	23	1	19+1	1	1	0	1+1	0
23	MF	(Nigeria) NGR	Mohammed Usman	13	2	10+3	2	0	0	0	0
25	GK	(Montenegro) MNE	Andrija Dragojević	34	0	28	0	2	0	3+1	0
26	MF	(Armenia) ARM	Hovhannes Ilangyozyan	4	1	2+2	1	0	0	0	0
27	DF	(Russia) RUS	Vyacheslav Dmitriyev	31	0	21+2	0	1+1	0	6	0
30	MF	(Armenia) ARM	Vahagn Hayrapetyan	21	0	7+6	0	2	0	6	0
31	GK	(Russia) RUS	Yevgeni Kobozev	7	0	4	0	0	0	3	0
33	FW	(Ivory Coast) CIV	Lassina Dao	6	1	0+6	1	0	0	0	0
63	DF	(Albania) ALB	Kristi Marku	11	1	11	1	0	0	0	0
66	DF	(Russia) RUS	Maksim Zhestokov	32	5	25	5	1	0	6	0
67	DF	(Russia) RUS	Sergei Kolychev	17	0	12+1	0	2	0	0+2	0
70	DF	(Ukraine) UKR	Serhiy Shevchuk	15	1	14+1	1	0	0	0	0
	MF	(Armenia) ARM	Arsen Gyulambaryan	1	0	0+1	0	0	0	0	0
Pyunik-2 players:
9	FW	(Armenia) ARM	Grenik Petrsoyan	9	0	0+8	0	0+1	0	0	0
10	MF	(Armenia) ARM	Vigen Begoyan	2	0	0+2	0	0	0	0	0
11	DF	(Armenia) ARM	Artak Asatryan	1	0	0+1	0	0	0	0	0
14	MF	(Armenia) ARM	Artur Nadiryan	3	0	2+1	0	0	0	0	0
18	FW	(Armenia) ARM	Ashot Kocharyan	1	0	1	0	0	0	0	0
27	DF	(Armenia) ARM	Vahe Muradyan	2	0	0+1	0	1	0	0	0
Players who left Pyunik during the season:
4	DF	(Armenia) ARM	Edmon Movsisyan	2	0	2	0	0	0	0	0
7	MF	(Armenia) ARM	Petros Avetisyan	15	2	7+4	2	1	0	3	0
9	FW	(Armenia) ARM	Ruslan Koryan	11	2	2+3	1	0	0	2+4	1
10	FW	(Armenia) ARM	Robert Minasyan	8	0	4+1	0	1+1	0	0+1	0
21	MF	(Russia) RUS	Albert Bogatyryov	3	0	0	0	0	0	0+3	0
23	MF	(Russia) RUS	Denis Voynov	19	2	8+4	1	1	0	6	1
24	DF	(Guinea-Bissau) GBS	Bacar Baldé	1	2	0	0	0	0	0+1	2
33	DF	(Ivory Coast) CIV	Didier Kadio	5	0	0	0	0	0	5	0

=== Goal scorers ===
Place	Position	Nation	Number	Name	Premier League	Armenian Cup	Europa League	Total
1	MF	(Armenia)	10	Erik Vardanyan	8	0	0	8
1	FW	(Ivory Coast)	11	Mohamed Konaté	6	0	2	8
3	DF	(Russia)	66	Maksim Zhestokov	5	0	0	5
3	FW	(Armenia)	9	Artur Miranyan	5	0	0	5
5	MF	(Armenia)	8	Rumyan Hovsepyan	4	0	0	4
6	MF	(Armenia)	18	Alik Arakelyan	2	1	0	3
7	MF	(Armenia)	7	Petros Avetisyan	2	0	0	2
7	MF	(Russia)	19	Denis Talalay	2	0	0	2
7	MF	(Nigeria)	23	Mohammed Usman	2	0	0	2
7	MF	(Russia)	23	Denis Voynov	1	0	1	2
7	FW	(Armenia)	9	Ruslan Koryan	1	0	1	2
7	DF	(Guinea-Bissau)	24	Bacar Baldé	0	0	2	2
13	MF	(Armenia)	8	Hovhannes Ilangyozyan	1	0	0	1
13	DF	(Russia)	19	Vitali Stezhko	1	0	0	1
13	MF	(Ukraine)	15	Maksym Trusevych	1	0	0	1
13	DF	(Ukraine)	70	Serhiy Shevchuk	1	0	0	1
13	FW	(Ivory Coast)	33	Lassina Dao	1	0	0	1
13	DF	(Albania)	63	Kristi Marku	1	0	0	1
13	MF	(Armenia)	6	Karlen Mkrtchyan	1	0	0	1
13				Own goal	1	0	0	1
				TOTALS	47	1	6	54

=== Clean sheets ===
Place	Position	Nation	Number	Name	Premier League	Armenian Cup	Europa League	Total
1	GK	(Montenegro)	25	Andrija Dragojević	10	0	2	12
2	GK	(Russia)	31	Yevgeni Kobozev	1	0	2	3
				TOTALS	11	0	4	15

=== Disciplinary record ===
Number	Nation	Position	Name	Premier League		Armenian Cup		UEFA Europa League		Total	
Number	Nation	Position	Name	Yellow card	Red card	Yellow card	Red card	Yellow card	Red card	Yellow card	Red card
2	(Armenia)	DF	Serob Grigoryan	2	0	0	0	3	0	5	0
3	(Armenia)	DF	Artur Kartashyan	3	0	1	0	0	0	4	0
5	(Armenia)	DF	Armen Manucharyan	3	0	0	0	0	0	3	0
6	(Armenia)	MF	Karlen Mkrtchyan	3	0	0	0	0	0	3	0
8	(Armenia)	MF	Rumyan Hovsepyan	4	0	0	0	1	0	5	0
9	(Armenia)	FW	Artur Miranyan	1	0	0	0	0	0	1	0
11	(Ivory Coast)	FW	Mohamed Konaté	0	0	0	0	2	0	2	0
13	(Russia)	FW	Denis Dorozhkin	1	0	0	0	0	0	1	0
15	(Ukraine)	MF	Maksym Trusevych	6	0	1	0	2	0	9	0
16	(Armenia)	DF	Robert Hakobyan	5	0	1	0	1	0	7	0
18	(Armenia)	MF	Alik Arakelyan	2	0	0	0	1	0	3	0
19	(Russia)	DF	Denis Talalay	1	0	0	0	0	0	1	0
21	(Russia)	DF	Vitali Stezhko	6	1	1	0	1	0	8	1
23	(Nigeria)	MF	Mohammed Usman	3	0	0	0	0	0	3	0
25	(Montenegro)	GK	Andrija Dragojević	3	0	0	0	0	0	3	0
27	(Russia)	DF	Vyacheslav Dmitriyev	3	0	0	0	0	0	3	0
30	(Armenia)	MF	Vahagn Hayrapetyan	5	1	0	0	1	0	6	1
31	(Russia)	GK	Yevgeni Kobozev	1	0	0	0	0	0	1	0
33	(Ivory Coast)	FW	Lassina Dao	1	0	0	0	0	0	1	0
61	(Albania)	DF	Kristi Marku	7	0	0	0	0	0	7	0
66	(Russia)	DF	Maksim Zhestokov	3	0	0	0	0	0	3	0
67	(Russia)	DF	Sergei Kolychev	5	0	1	0	0	0	6	0
70	(Ukraine)	DF	Serhiy Shevchuk	1	0	0	0	0	0	1	0
98	(Armenia)	MF	Erik Vardanyan	2	0	0	0	0	0	2	0
Pyunik-2 players:
10	(Armenia)	MF	Vigen Begoyan	1	0	0	0	0	0	1	0
Players who left Pyunik during the season:
7	(Armenia)	MF	Petros Avetisyan	1	0	0	0	3	1	4	1
10	(Armenia)	FW	Robert Minasyan	0	1	1	0	0	0	1	1
23	(Russia)	MF	Denis Voynov	2	0	0	0	0	0	2	0
			TOTALS	75	3	6	0	15	1	96	4
