= 2019–20 FC Pyunik season =

Pyunik
2019-20 season
- Chairman: Rafik Hayrapetyan
- Manager: Aleksandr Tarkhanov (Until 30 October); Suren Chakhalyan (Caretaker) (30 October-8 January); Roman Berezovsky; From 8 January)
- Stadium: Vazgen Sargsyan Republican Stadium
- Premier League: 7th
- Armenian Cup: Second Round
- Europa League: Third qualifying round vs Wolverhampton Wanderers
- Top goalscorer: League: Denis Mahmudov (9); All: Denis Mahmudov (9)
Home colours	Away colours

The 2019–20 season was Pyunik's 26th season in the Armenian Premier League.

== Season events ==
On 24 October, Erik Vardanyan extended his contract with Pyunik.

On 30 October, manager Aleksandr Tarkhanov became Vice President of Development with Assistant manager Suren Chakhalyan being appointed acting Head Coach.

On 5 November, Pyunik announced that Erik Vardanyan would move to PFC Sochi on 1 January 2020.

On 2 December, Nirisarike signed a new contract with Pyunik.

On 12 December, goalkeeper Sevak Aslanyan extended his contract, with Levon Vardanyan signing his first professional contract on 17 December.

On 8 January, Roman Berezovsky was confirmed as the new manager of Pyunik.

On 25 January, Pyunik announced the signing of Joseph Adah.

On 12 March 2020, the Football Federation of Armenia announced that all Armenian Premier League games had been postponed until 23 March due to the COVID-19 pandemic.

On 6 May, Pyunik signed a cooperation agreement with Chinese club FC Shanghai Linkman.

On 30 June, Pyunik announced that they had extended Aras Özbiliz's contract for an additional year.

On 9 July, Pyunik announced that they had extended their contracts with Arthur Nadiryan, Norayr Ghazaryan and Serob Grigoryan.

== Squad ==
As of 1 July 2020

Note: Flags indicate national team as defined under FIFA eligibility rules; some limited exceptions apply. Players may hold more than one non-FIFA nationality.

No.	Pos.	Nation	Player
2	DF	ARM	Serob Grigoryan
3	DF	ARM	Artur Kartashyan
4	DF	RUS	Anton Belov
5	DF	ARM	Armen Manucharyan
6	MF	ARM	Karlen Mkrtchyan (captain)
7	MF	ARM	Artem Simonyan
8	DF	MKD	Antonio Stankov
9	FW	ARM	Artur Miranyan
11	DF	COD	Guy Magema
12	GK	ARM	Sevak Aslanyan
13	MF	ARM	Erik Azizyan
14	MF	ARM	Artur Nadiryan
17	MF	ARM	Artak Yedigaryan
18	MF	ARM	Alik Arakelyan
22	DF	ARM	Robert Hakobyan

No.	Pos.	Nation	Player
23	MF	ARM	Aras Özbiliz
24	DF	RWA	Salomon Nirisarike
25	GK	MNE	Andrija Dragojević
31	GK	RUS	Vladimir Sugrobov (loan from Tambov)
42	FW	NGR	Steven Alfred (loan from Sochi)
44	MF	ARM	Norayr Ghazaryan
55	DF	ARM	Perch Poghikyan
63	DF	ALB	Kristi Marku
65	MF	RUS	Dmitri Malyaka
66	DF	RUS	Maksim Zhestokov
70	MF	UKR	Serhiy Shevchuk
77	FW	MKD	Denis Mahmudov
79	MF	ARM	Levon Vardanyan
80	MF	ARM	Daniel Aghbalyan
96	MF	NGR	Joseph Adah

== Transfers ==
=== In ===
Date	Position	Nationality	Name	From	Fee	Ref.
Summer 2019	DF	(North Macedonia)	Antonio Stankov	Dordrecht	Undisclosed	
Summer 2019	MF	(Armenia)	Artem Simonyan	Ararat Yerevan	Undisclosed	
Summer 2019	MF	(Armenia)	Artak Yedigaryan	Alashkert	Undisclosed	
6 June 2019	MF	(Russia)	Stanislav Yefimov	Yerevan	Undisclosed	
6 June 2019	MF	(Ukraine)	Serhiy Shevchuk	Tambov	Undisclosed	
6 June 2019	FW	(Armenia)	Edgar Manucharyan	Alashkert	Free	
16 June 2019	DF	(Russia)	Anton Belov	Anzhi Makhachkala	Undisclosed	
4 July 2019	MF	(Armenia)	Eduard Avagyan	Noah	Undisclosed	
17 July 2019	MF	(Montenegro)	Marko Burzanović	Inter Zaprešić	Undisclosed	
17 July 2019	FW	(North Macedonia)	Denis Mahmudov	Excelsior	Undisclosed	
31 August 2019	MF	(Armenia)	Aras Özbiliz	Beşiktaş	Free	
31 August 2019	FW	(Russia)	Dmitri Sychev		Free	
1 September 2019	DF	(Rwanda)	Salomon Nirisarike	Tubize	Undisclosed	
15 January 2020	MF	(Armenia)	Erik Azizyan	Ararat-Armenia II	Undisclosed	
25 January 2020	MF	(Nigeria)	Joseph Adah	Slutsk	Free	
26 January 2020	DF	(Russia)	Maksim Zhestokov	Pyunik	Free	
24 February 2020	DF	(Democratic Republic of the Congo)	Guy Magema	Urartu	Undisclosed	
25 February 2020	MF	(Russia)	Dmitri Malyaka	Gomel	Undisclosed	

=== Loans in ===
Date from	Position	Nationality	Name	From	Date to	Ref.
5 July 2019	MF	(Russia)	Aleksandr Galimov	Ural Yekaterinburg	10 January 2020	
5 July 2019	FW	(Nigeria)	Steven Alfred	Sochi	End of Season	
29 August 2019	MF	(Nigeria)	Ugochukwu Iwu	Lori	End of Season	
17 January 2020	GK	(Russia)	Vladimir Sugrobov	Tambov	End of Season	

=== Out ===
Date	Position	Nationality	Name	To	Fee	Ref.
1 October 2019	MF	(Mali)	Daouda Toure	Al Dhafra	Undisclosed	
5 November 2019†	MF	(Armenia)	Erik Vardanyan	Sochi	Undisclosed	

† Vardanyan's transfer was announced on the above date, becoming official on 1 January 2020.

=== Released ===
Date	Position	Nationality	Name	Joined	Date
31 May 2019	MF	(Armenia)	Vahagn Hayrapetyan	Alashkert	5 July 2019
1 June 2019	DF	(Russia)	Sergei Kolychev		
1 June 2019	DF	(Russia)	Vyacheslav Dmitriyev	Ararat Moscow	
1 June 2019	MF	(Nigeria)	Mohammed Usman	Tambov	
1 June 2019	FW	(Ivory Coast)	Lassina Dao		
1 June 2019	FW	(Ivory Coast)	Mohamed Konaté	Tambov	
1 June 2019	FW	(Russia)	Denis Dorozhkin	Novosibirsk	
14 June 2019	MF	(Russia)	Denis Talalay	Tom Tomsk	
16 June 2019	MF	(Ukraine)	Maksym Trusevych	Juniors Shpytky	
19 June 2019	MF	(Armenia)	Rumyan Hovsepyan	Arda Kardzhali	26 June 2019
19 August 2019	GK	(Armenia)	Gor Manukyan	Alashkert	26 August 2019
19 August 2019	MF	(Armenia)	Eduard Avagyan	Alashkert	26 August 2019
2 December 2019	MF	(Russia)	Stanislav Yefimov	Van	
6 December 2019	GK	(Russia)	Yevgeni Kobozev	Ararat Yerevan	29 January 2020
6 December 2019	MF	(Armenia)	Hovhannes Ilangyozyan	Van	
6 December 2019	MF	(Armenia)	Hovhannes Poghosyan	Telavi	
6 December 2019	MF	(Montenegro)	Marko Burzanović	OFK Grbalj	
6 December 2019	FW	(Russia)	Dmitri Sychev	Retired	10 December 2019
19 December 2019	DF	(Russia)	Maksim Zhestokov	Pyunik	26 January 2020
24 December 2019	FW	(Armenia)	Edgar Manucharyan	Alashkert	4 March 2020
30 June 2020	MF	(Ukraine)	Serhiy Shevchuk	Juniors Shpytky	
2 July 2020	DF	(Democratic Republic of the Congo)	Guy Magema	AS Vita	
2 July 2020	DF	(North Macedonia)	Antonio Stankov		
2 July 2020	MF	(Armenia)	Artem Simonyan	Noah	1 August 2020
2 July 2020	MF	(Armenia)	Artak Yedigaryan	Ararat Yerevan	25 July 2020
2 July 2020	MF	(Russia)	Dmitri Malyaka	Lernayin Artsakh Goris	
2 July 2020	FW	(North Macedonia)	Denis Mahmudov	Roeselare	5 August 2020
3 July 2020	MF	(Russia)	Anton Belov	Tom Tomsk	
7 July 2020	MF	(Armenia)	Karlen Mkrtchyan		
12 July 2020	MF	(Nigeria)	Joseph Adah	Gandzasar Kapan	
31 July 2020	DF	(Russia)	Maksim Zhestokov	Akron Tolyatti	4 September 2020
31 July 2020	FW	(Armenia)	Artur Miranyan	Urartu	1 March 2021

== Friendlies ==
13 October 2019	Dynamo Moscow (Russia)	2 – 0	(Armenia) Pyunik	Moscow, Russia
17:00 (UTC+4)	Igboun (yellow card) 23'; Neustädter 67', 71'	Report		Stadium: VTB Novogorks-Dynamo Training Centre; Attendance: 0 Referee: Alexey Sukhoi

18 January 2020	Pyunik	0 – 2	Shirak	Yerevan
13:00 (UTC+4)		Report	A.Aslanyan; L.Mryan	Stadium: Pyunik Stadium

26 January 2020	Pyunik (Armenia)	2 – 5	(Ukraine) Oleksandriya	Alanya, Turkey
(UTC+4)	Shendrik 29' (o.g.); Yedigaryan 68'	Report	Goal

29 January 2020	Pyunik (Armenia)	2 – 3	(Bulgaria) Levski Sofia	Alanya, Turkey
18:30 (UTC+4)	Iwu 13'; Shevchuk 74' (pen.)	Report	Spierings 10'; Dimitrov 78'; Nascimento 87'

1 February 2020	Pyunik (Armenia)	1 – 1	(Bulgaria) Vitosha Bistritsa	Alanya, Turkey
(UTC+4)	Arakelyan	Report	Goal

11 February 2020	Pyunik (Armenia)	3 – 1	(Kazakhstan) Caspiy	Alanya, Turkey
(UTC+4)	Simonyan; Trialist; Arakelyan	Report	Goal

15 February 2020	Pyunik (Armenia)	0 – 2	(Belarus) Gorodeya	Alanya, Turkey
17:00 (UTC+4)		Report	Goal

17 February 2020	Pyunik (Armenia)	3 – 1	(Sweden) AFC Eskilstuna	Alanya, Turkey
(UTC+4)	Yedigaryan; Mahmudov; Marku	Report	Goal

19 February 2020	Pyunik (Armenia)	0 – 2	(Latvia) Spartaks Jūrmala	Alanya, Turkey
(UTC+4)		Report	Goal

16 May 2020	Noah	1 – 1	Pyunik	Yerevan
(UTC+4)	L.Vardanyan	Report	Deobald	Stadium: Yerevan Football Academy Stadium; Attendance: 0

== Competitions ==
=== Overall record ===
Competition	First match	Last match	Starting round	Final position	Record							
Competition	First match	Last match	Starting round	Final position	Pld	W	D	L	GF	GA	GD	Win %
Premier League	11 August 2019	1 July 2020	Matchday 1	8th	22	8	2	12	39	42	−3	36.36
Armenian Cup	2 November 2019	2 November 2019	Second round	Second round	1	0	1	0	0	0	+0	0.00
UEFA Europa League	11 July 2019	15 August 2019	First qualifying round	Third qualifying round	6	2	2	2	7	13	−6	33.33
Total					29	10	5	14	46	55	−9	34.48

Last updated: 1 July 2020
Source: Competitions

=== Premier League ===
==== Regular season ====
===== Results summary =====
Overall								Home						Away					
Pld	W	D	L	GF	GA	GD	Pts	W	D	L	GF	GA	GD	W	D	L	GF	GA	GD
18	7	2	9	35	36	−1	23	4	0	5	13	16	−3	3	2	4	22	20	+2

Last updated: 23 May 2020.
Source: See Results

===== Results =====
11 August 2019 2	Urartu	0 – 3	Pyunik	Yerevan
19:30 (UTC+4)	J.Grgec (yellow card) 65'	Report	Belov (yellow card) 19'; Yedigaryan 78'; Miranyan 82'; Simonyan 90+1'	Stadium: Banants Stadium; Attendance: 730; Referee: Zaven Hovhannisyan

19 August 2019 3	Pyunik	1 – 4	Ararat Yerevan	Yerevan
19:15 (UTC+4)	Simonyan 65'; Belov (yellow card) 75'	Report	João Victor (yellow card) 16'; Dedechko 45', 85'; Morozov (yellow card) 45'; Khurtsidze (yellow card) 71'; Badoyan 79'; Welsen Junior 90+2'	Stadium: Yerevan Football Academy Stadium; Attendance: 820; Referee: Suren Baliyan

25 August 2019 4	Shirak	3 – 1	Pyunik	Gyumri
17:00 (UTC+4)	A.Aslanyan (yellow card) 6'; M.Kone 37', 63', 80'	Report	Stankov (yellow card) 68'; A.Manucharyan (yellow card) 90+1' (yellow-red card) 90+2'; Miranyan 90+3'	Stadium: Gyumri City Stadium; Attendance: 800; Referee: Zaven Hovhannisyan

30 August 2019 5	Pyunik	4 – 1	Yerevan	Yerevan
18:00 (UTC+4)	Mahmudov 9', 42'; Simonyan 21'; M.Evstigneev 45+1' (o.g.)	Report	Isayev 84'	Stadium: Yerevan Football Academy Stadium; Attendance: 250; Referee: Henrik Nalbandyan

13 September 2019 6	Pyunik	0 – 3	Alashkert	Yerevan
19:15 (UTC+4)	Simonyan (yellow card) 40'; Grigoryan (yellow card) 41'; Zhestokov (yellow card) 45+1'; Marku (yellow card) 64'; A.Manucharyan (yellow card) 71'; Iwu (yellow card) 79'	Report	Marmentini 27', 57'; Cametá (yellow card) 52'; Voskanyan (yellow card) 59'; Galvão 85'; Daghbashyan (yellow card) 90'	Stadium: Vazgen Sargsyan Republican Stadium; Attendance: 200; Referee: Gevorg Eghoyan

17 September 2019 7	Gandzasar Kapan	1 – 2	Pyunik	Yerevan
17:30 (UTC+4)	H.Asoyan (yellow card) 39'; A.Kocharyan 82'; D.Minasyan (yellow card) 89'; G.Harutyunyan (yellow card) 90'	Report	Mahmudov 12'; Özbiliz 59'	Stadium: Yerevan Football Academy Stadium; Attendance: 170; Referee: Suren Baliyan
Note: Match played at the Yerevan Football Academy in Yerevan, instead of Gandzasar Kapan regular Gandzasar Stadium in Kapan.

22 September 2019 8	Pyunik	1 – 2	Noah	Yerevan
17:00 (UTC+4)	Miranyan 30'; Marku (yellow card) 55' (yellow-red card) 82'; Yedigaryan (yellow card) 80'	Report	Mayrovich 27'; Lavrishchev 60'; Gareginyan (yellow card) 88'; Deobald (yellow card) 90+2'	Stadium: Vazgen Sargsyan Republican Stadium; Attendance: 300; Referee: Zaven Hovhannisyan

26 September 2019 1	Pyunik	3 – 1	Lori	Yerevan
19:30 (UTC+4)	Nirisarike 11'; Miranyan 68'; Alfred 75'	Report	L.Matheus (yellow card) 61'; Désiré 81'	Stadium: Vazgen Sargsyan Republican Stadium; Attendance: 500; Referee: Suren Baliyan
Note: Match originally scheduled for 4 August 2019.

30 September 2019 9	Ararat-Armenia	3 – 1	Pyunik	Yerevan
19:00 (UTC+4)	Mailson 19'; Pashov (yellow card) 31'; Guz (yellow card) 39'; Kobyalko 58'; Achenteh (yellow card) 65'; Avetisyan 70'	Report	Özbiliz 6' (yellow card) 10'; Vardanyan (yellow card) 86'	Stadium: Yerevan Football Academy Stadium; Attendance: 900; Referee: Henrik Nalbandyan

5 October 2019 10	Lori	2 – 2	Pyunik	Vanadzor
19:30 (UTC+4)	Désiré 30' (pen.), 61' (pen.); Zayerko (yellow card) 44'; X.Auzmendi (yellow card) 69'	Report	Yedigaryan (yellow card) 14' (goal) 35' (pen.); Mahmudov (yellow card) 25'; Simonyan (yellow card) 40'; Vardanyan (yellow card) 57'; Miranyan 78'	Stadium: Vanadzor Football Academy; Attendance: 1,000; Referee: Ashot Ghaltakchyan

20 October 2019 11	Pyunik	1 – 2	Urartu	Yerevan
17:30 (UTC+4)	Grigoryan (yellow card) 21'; Marku (yellow card) 36'; Alfred (yellow card) 40'; Yedigaryan 81'; Dragojević (yellow card) 90+2'; E.Manucharyan (yellow card) 90+3'	Report	Juan Carlos Azocar 8'; Voskanyan (red card) 17'; Budnik 26'; Kobzar (yellow card) 45+1'; A.Ayvazov (yellow card) 88'	Stadium: Vazgen Sargsyan Republican Stadium; Attendance: 600; Referee: Artur Safaryan

27 October 2019 12	Ararat Yerevan	4 – 2	Pyunik	Yerevan
16:00 (UTC+4)	Toboyev (yellow card) 24'; Dedechko (yellow card) 31' (goal) 45+1'; Welsen Junior 54'; Khurtsidze 58'; João Victor (yellow card) 66'; Spychka (yellow card) 81'; Aleksanyan 90+1' (pen.) (yellow card) 90+2'	Report	Mahmudov 22'; Iwu (yellow card) 45'; Vardanyan (red card) 67'; Stankov 90+3'; Grigoryan (yellow card) 90+4'	Stadium: Vazgen Sargsyan Republican Stadium; Attendance: 500; Referee: Henrik Nalbandyan

8 November 2019 13	Pyunik	1 – 0	Shirak	Yerevan
18:30 (UTC+4)	Mahmudov 14'; Zhestokov (yellow card) 17'; R.Hakobyan (yellow card) 27' (yellow-red card) 51'	Report	Prljević (yellow card) 8'; Miličić (yellow card) 62'; Gevorkyan (yellow card) 73'	Stadium: Vazgen Sargsyan Republican Stadium; Attendance: 250; Referee: Zaven Hovhannisyan

25 November 2019 14	Yerevan	2 – 8	Pyunik	Vanadzor
14:00 (UTC+4)	A.Mir Doraghi (yellow card) 16'; Isayev 58'; A.Portugalyan 78'; Elias (red card) 84'	Report	Arakelyan 14'; Mahmudov 16' (pen.), 20', 32', 78' (yellow card) 29'; A.Manucharyan 25'; Shevchuk 29'; Stankov (yellow card) 46'; Miranyan 85' (pen.)	Stadium: Vanadzor City Stadium; Attendance: 20; Referee: Henrik Nalbandyan
Note: Match played at the Vanadzor City Stadium in Vanadzor, instead of Yerevan's regular Vazgen Sargsyan Republican Stadium in Yerevan.

1 December 2019 15	Alashkert	1 – 1	Pyunik	Yerevan
14:00 (UTC+4)	Thiago Galvão 34' (pen.); Baranov (yellow card) 40' (yellow-red card) 70'; Miljković (yellow card) 60'	Report	Yedigaryan 23' (yellow card) 27'; Dragojević (yellow card) 33'	Stadium: Alashkert Stadium; Attendance: 300; Referee: Zaven Hovhannisyan

28 February 2020 16	Pyunik	2 – 0	Gandzasar Kapan	Yerevan
14:45 (UTC+4)	Özbiliz 33' (pen.); Mkrtchyan 41'	Report	A.Mensah (red card) 31'; Wbeymar (yellow card) 78'	Stadium: Yerevan Football Academy Stadium; Attendance: 500; Referee: Ashot Ghaltakchyan
Note: Match played at the Yerevan Football Academy Stadium in Yerevan, instead of Pyunik's regular Vazgen Sargsyan Republican Stadium in Yerevan.

7 March 2020 17	Noah	4 – 2	Pyunik	Yerevan
14:15 (UTC+4)	Deobald 2'; Azarov 17', 84' (pen.); H.Manga (yellow card) 34'; A.Tatayev (yellow card) 43'; V.Vimercati (yellow card) 44'; Spătaru 61'; Kovalenko (yellow card) 75'	Report	Özbiliz 44' (pen.), 55'; Zhestokov (yellow card) 61'; Nirisarike (yellow card) 76'; Stankov (yellow card) 83'; Dragojević (yellow card) 87'	Stadium: Alashkert Stadium; Attendance: 500; Referee: Henrik Nalbandyan
Note: Match played at the Alashkert Stadium in Yerevan, instead of Noah's regular Mika Stadium in Yerevan.

23 May 2020 18	Pyunik	0 – 3	Ararat-Armenia	Yerevan
18:15 (UTC+4)	E.Azizyan (yellow card) 77'	Report	Otubanjo 21' (pen.); Sanogo 23'; Sugrobov 30'	Stadium: Yerevan Football Academy Stadium; Attendance: 0 Referee: Artur Safaryan
Note: Match played behind closed doors. Match was originally scheduled for 17 March, but postponed on 13 March due to the COVID-19 pandemic.

===== Table =====
Pos	Team	Pld	W	D	L	GF	GA	GD	Pts	Qualification
1	Ararat-Armenia	18	11	3	4	33	15	+18	36	Qualification for the Championship round
2	Lori	18	9	5	4	27	19	+8	32	Qualification for the Championship round
3	Alashkert	18	9	4	5	33	20	+13	31	Qualification for the Championship round
4	Ararat	18	9	4	5	25	18	+7	31	Qualification for the Championship round
5	Noah	18	9	3	6	25	19	+6	30	Qualification for the Championship round
6	Shirak	18	8	4	6	25	18	+7	28	Qualification for the Championship round
7	Pyunik	18	7	2	9	35	36	−1	23	Qualification for the Relegation round
8	Urartu	18	6	5	7	22	24	−2	23	Qualification for the Relegation round
9	Gandzasar	18	4	6	8	20	25	−5	18	Qualification for the Relegation round
10	Yerevan (R, D)	18	0	0	18	11	62	−51	0	Withdrawn

Source: Soccerway
Rules for classification: 1) Points; 2) Play-off (only if deciding champion); 3) Matches won; 4) Head-to-head points; 5) Head-to-head matches won; 6) Head-to-head goal difference; 7) Head-to-head goals scored; 8) Head-to-head away goals scored; 9) Goal difference; 10) Goals scored.
(D) Disqualified; (R) Relegated

==== Relegation round ====
===== Results summary =====
Overall								Home						Away					
Pld	W	D	L	GF	GA	GD	Pts	W	D	L	GF	GA	GD	W	D	L	GF	GA	GD
4	1	0	3	4	6	−2	3	0	0	2	3	5	−2	1	0	1	1	1	0

Last updated: 1 July 2020.
Source: See Results

===== Results =====
9 June 2020 21	Pyunik	1 – 2	Urartu	Yerevan
18:30 (UTC+4)	Belov (yellow card) 71'; E.Azizyan 89' (yellow card) 90+2'; Manucharyan (yellow card) 90+4'	Report	H. Hakobyan (yellow card) 26'; E.Petrosyan 63'; A.Portugalyan 80'	Stadium: Vazgen Sargsyan Republican Stadium; Attendance: 0 Referee: Erik Galstyan
Note: Match played behind closed doors due to the COVID-19 pandemic.

13 June 2020 22	Gandzasar Kapan	1 – 0	Pyunik	Yerevan
18:30 (UTC+4)	A.Grigoryan (yellow card) 29'; A.Zoko 55' (yellow card) 66'	Report		Stadium: Yerevan Football Academy; Attendance: 0 Referee: Artem Gasparyan
Note: Match played at the Yerevan Football Academy in Yerevan, instead of Gandzasar Kapan regular Gandzasar Stadium in Kapan. Match played behind closed doors due to the COVID-19 pandemic.

28 June 2020 25	Urartu	0 – 1	Pyunik	Yerevan
19:30 (UTC+4)		Report	Adah 41'; Belov (yellow card) 70'; A.Manucharyan (yellow card) 74'	Stadium: Urartu Stadium; Attendance: 0 Referee: Artem Gasparyan
Note: Match played behind closed doors due to the COVID-19 pandemic.

1 July 2020 26	Pyunik	2 – 3	Gandzasar Kapan	Yerevan
19:00 (UTC+4)	Simonyan (yellow card) 36'; E.Azizyan (yellow card) 75'; Manucharyan 77' (pen.); L.Vardanyan (yellow card) 79'; A.Sargsyan 88'	Report	Simonyan 15' (o.g.); A.Hovhannisyan (yellow card) 76'; G.Harutyunyan 80' (pen.), 90+4'; E.Yeghiazaryan (yellow card) 90+3'	Stadium: Vazgen Sargsyan Republican Stadium; Attendance: 0 Referee: Artem Gasparyan
Note: Match played behind closed doors due to the COVID-19 pandemic.

===== Table =====
Pos	Team	Pld	W	D	L	GF	GA	GD	Pts
1	Urartu	22	8	6	8	26	27	−1	30
2	Pyunik	22	8	2	12	39	42	−3	26
3	Gandzasar	22	6	7	9	25	29	−4	25

Source: Soccerway
Rules for classification: 1) Points; 2) Play-off (only if deciding champion); 3) Matches won; 4) Head-to-head points; 5) Head-to-head matches won; 6) Head-to-head goal difference; 7) Head-to-head goals scored; 8) Head-to-head away goals scored; 9) Goal difference; 10) Goals scored.

=== Armenian Cup ===
2 November 2019 Second Round	Pyunik	0 – 0 (3 – 5 p)	Urartu	Yerevan
16:00 (UTC+4)	Stankov (yellow card) 80'; Robert Hakobyan (yellow card) 90'	Report		Stadium: Yerevan Football Academy Stadium; Attendance: 350; Referee: Zaven Hovhannisyan

=== UEFA Europa League ===
==== Qualifying rounds ====
11 July 2019 First qualifying round 1st leg	Pyunik (Armenia)	3 – 3	(North Macedonia) Shkupi	Gyumri, Armenia
17:30 (UTC+4)	Vardanyan 4' (pen.); Zhestokov 80'; E.Manucharyan 85'	Report	Bajrami 26', 60'; Ilieski 43'	Stadium: Gyumri City Stadium; Attendance: 2,050; Referee: Luca Barbeno (San Marino)
Note: Pyunik played their home match at Gyumri City Stadium, Gyumri, instead of their regular stadium Vazgen Sargsyan Republican Stadium, Yerevan.

18 July 2019 First qualifying round 2nd leg	Shkupi (North Macedonia)	1 – 2 (4 – 5 agg.)	(Armenia) Pyunik	Skopje, North Macedonia
22:30 (UTC+4)	Adili (yellow card) 34'; Bajrami (yellow card) 70'; Jurina 82'; Serginho (red card) 86'	Report	Edigaryan 7'; Simonyan (yellow card) 9'; Miranyan 31'; Shevchuk (yellow card) 44'; Marku (yellow card) 79'; Zhestokov (yellow card) 87'; Dragojević (yellow card) 90+5'	Stadium: Toše Proeski Arena; Attendance: 8,045; Referee: Vitaliy Romanov (Ukraine)
Note: Shkupi play their home matches at Toše Proeski Arena, Skopje, instead of their regular stadium Čair Stadium, Skopje which does not meet UEFA requirements.

25 July 2019 Second qualifying round 1st leg	Pyunik (Armenia)	2 – 1	(Czech Republic) Jablonec	Gyumri, Armenia
17:30 (UTC+4)	Miranyan 6', 30'; Marku (yellow card) 25'; Zhestokov (yellow card) 68'; Yedigaryan (yellow card) 90+4'	Report	Doležal 53'; Acosta (yellow card) 90+3'	Stadium: Gyumri City Stadium; Attendance: 1,940; Referee: Fedayi San (Switzerland)
Note: Pyunik played their home match at Gyumri City Stadium, Gyumri, instead of their regular stadium Vazgen Sargsyan Republican Stadium, Yerevan.

1 August 2019 Second qualifying round 2nd leg	Jablonec (Czech Republic)	0 – 0 (1 – 2 agg.)	(Armenia) Pyunik	Jablonec nad Nisou, Czech Republic
21:00 (UTC+4)	Břečka (yellow card) 32' (yellow-red card) 88'; Sýkora (yellow card) 37'; Jugas (yellow card) 37'; Hübschman (yellow card) 54'	Report	Stankov (yellow card) 29'; A.Manucharyan (yellow card) 52'; Vardanyan (yellow card) 68' (yellow-red card) 87'	Stadium: Stadion Střelnice; Attendance: 3,675; Referee: Sergey Lapochkin (Russia)

8 August 2019 Third qualifying round 1st leg	Pyunik (Armenia)	0 – 4	(England) Wolverhampton Wanderers	Gyumri, Armenia
20:00 (UTC+4)		Report	Doherty 29'; Saïss (yellow card) 32'; Jiménez 42', 46'; Moutinho (yellow card) 70'; Neves 90+1' (pen.)	Stadium: Gyumri City Stadium; Attendance: 13,050; Referee: Michael Fabbri (Italy)
Note: Pyunik played their home match at Gyumri City Stadium, Gyumri, instead of their regular stadium Vazgen Sargsyan Republican Stadium, Yerevan.

15 August 2019 Third qualifying round 2nd leg	Wolverhampton Wanderers (England)	4 – 0 (8 – 0 agg.)	(Armenia) Pyunik	Wolverhampton, England
22:45 (UTC+4)	Vallejo (yellow card) 27'; Neto 54'; Gibbs-White 58'; Vinagre 64'; Jota 87'	Report		Stadium: Molineux Stadium; Attendance: 29,391; Referee: Donatas Rumsas (Lithuania)
Note: Bastian Dankert (Germany) was originally appointed to referee this match by UEFA but was replaced due to injury.

== Statistics ==
As of match played 1 July 2020

=== Appearances and goals ===
No.	Pos	Nat	Player	Total		Premier League		Armenian Cup		Europa League	
No.	Pos	Nat	Player	Apps	Goals	Apps	Goals	Apps	Goals	Apps	Goals
2	DF	(Armenia) ARM	Serob Grigoryan	17	0	15+1	0	1	0	0	0
3	DF	(Armenia) ARM	Artur Kartashyan	7	0	7	0	0	0	0	0
4	DF	(Russia) RUS	Anton Belov	9	0	5+3	0	0	0	1	0
5	DF	(Armenia) ARM	Armen Manucharyan	23	2	14+2	2	1	0	6	0
6	MF	(Armenia) ARM	Karlen Mkrtchyan	11	1	6	1	0	0	5	0
7	MF	(Armenia) ARM	Artem Simonyan	26	3	13+6	3	0+1	0	5+1	0
8	DF	(North Macedonia) MKD	Antonio Stankov	20	1	10+3	1	1	0	6	0
9	FW	(Armenia) ARM	Artur Miranyan	19	9	10+2	6	1	0	6	3
11	DF	(Democratic Republic of the Congo) COD	Guy Magema	5	0	5	0	0	0	0	0
12	GK	(Armenia) ARM	Sevak Aslanyan	2	0	2	0	0	0	0	0
13	MF	(Armenia) ARM	Erik Azizyan	5	1	3+2	1	0	0	0	0
14	MF	(Armenia) ARM	Artur Nadiryan	1	0	0+1	0	0	0	0	0
17	MF	(Armenia) ARM	Artak Yedigaryan	23	5	11+6	4	1	0	4+1	1
18	MF	(Armenia) ARM	Alik Arakelyan	10	1	7+2	1	0+1	0	0	0
22	DF	(Armenia) ARM	Robert Hakobyan	9	0	7+1	0	1	0	0	0
23	MF	(Armenia) ARM	Aras Özbiliz	11	5	9+2	5	0	0	0	0
24	DF	(Rwanda) RWA	Salomon Nirisarike	11	1	10	1	1	0	0	0
25	GK	(Montenegro) MNE	Andrija Dragojević	24	0	17	0	1	0	6	0
26	DF	(Armenia) ARM	Arsen Sargsyan	2	1	0+2	1	0	0	0	0
31	GK	(Russia) RUS	Vladimir Sugrobov	3	0	3	0	0	0	0	0
42	FW	(Nigeria) NGR	Steven Alfred	13	1	3+6	1	0	0	0+4	0
44	MF	(Armenia) ARM	Norayr Ghazaryan	5	0	0+5	0	0	0	0	0
55	DF	(Armenia) ARM	Perch Poghikyan	1	0	0+1	0	0	0	0	0
63	DF	(Albania) ALB	Kristi Marku	10	0	5	0	0	0	5	0
65	MF	(Russia) RUS	Dmitri Malyaka	3	0	2+1	0	0	0	0	0
66	DF	(Russia) RUS	Maksim Zhestokov	24	1	17	0	1	0	6	1
70	MF	(Ukraine) UKR	Serhiy Shevchuk	23	1	12+4	1	0+1	0	6	0
77	FW	(North Macedonia) MKD	Denis Mahmudov	19	9	12+4	9	1	0	1+1	0
79	MF	(Armenia) ARM	Levon Vardanyan	6	0	3+3	0	0	0	0	0
80	MF	(Armenia) ARM	Daniel Aghbalyan	4	0	3+1	0	0	0	0	0
96	MF	(Nigeria) NGR	Joseph Adah	6	1	5+1	1	0	0	0	0
Players away on loan:
Players who left Pyunik during the season:
10	MF	(Armenia) ARM	Erik Vardanyan	14	1	8+1	0	0	0	5	1
11	FW	(Armenia) ARM	Edgar Manucharyan	4	1	0+3	0	0	0	0+1	1
13	MF	(Russia) RUS	Stanislav Yefimov	9	0	3+1	0	0	0	5	0
20	MF	(Nigeria) NGR	Ugochukwu Iwu	15	0	13+1	0	1	0	0	0
26	MF	(Armenia) ARM	Hovhannes Ilangyozyan	1	0	0+1	0	0	0	0	0
65	MF	(Russia) RUS	Aleksandr Galimov	6	0	0+4	0	0	0	0+2	0
98	MF	(Montenegro) MNE	Marko Burzanović	4	0	1+1	0	0+1	0	0+1	0

=== Goal scorers ===
Place	Position	Nation	Number	Name	Premier League	Armenian Cup	Europa League	Total
1	FW	(North Macedonia)	77	Denis Mahmudov	9	0	0	9
1	FW	(Armenia)	9	Artur Miranyan	6	0	3	9
3	MF	(Armenia)	23	Aras Özbiliz	5	0	0	5
3	MF	(Armenia)	17	Artak Yedigaryan	4	0	1	5
5	MF	(Armenia)	7	Artem Simonyan	3	0	0	3
6	DF	(Armenia)	5	Armen Manucharyan	2	0	0	2
7	DF	(Rwanda)	24	Salomon Nirisarike	1	0	0	1
7	FW	(Nigeria)	42	Steven Alfred	1	0	0	1
7	DF	(North Macedonia)	8	Antonio Stankov	1	0	0	1
7	MF	(Armenia)	18	Alik Arakelyan	1	0	0	1
7	MF	(Ukraine)	70	Serhiy Shevchuk	1	0	0	1
7	MF	(Armenia)	6	Karlen Mkrtchyan	1	0	0	1
7	MF	(Armenia)	13	Erik Azizyan	1	0	0	1
7	MF	(Nigeria)	96	Joseph Adah	1	0	0	1
7	DF	(Armenia)	26	Arsen Sargsyan	1	0	0	1
7	MF	(Armenia)	10	Erik Vardanyan	0	0	1	1
7	DF	(Russia)	66	Maksim Zhestokov	0	0	1	1
7	FW	(Armenia)	11	Edgar Manucharyan	0	0	1	1
7				Own goal	1	0	0	1
				TOTALS	39	0	7	46

=== Clean sheets ===
Place	Position	Nation	Number	Name	Premier League	Armenian Cup	Europa League	Total
1	GK	(Montenegro)	25	Andrija Dragojević	3	1	1	5
2	GK	(Russia)	31	Vladimir Sugrobov	1	0	0	1
				TOTALS	4	1	1	6

=== Disciplinary record ===
Number	Nation	Position	Name	Premier League		Armenian Cup		Europa League		Total	
Number	Nation	Position	Name	Yellow card	Red card	Yellow card	Red card	Yellow card	Red card	Yellow card	Red card
2	(Armenia)	DF	Serob Grigoryan	3	0	0	0	0	0	3	0
4	(Russia)	DF	Anton Belov	4	0	0	0	0	0	4	0
5	(Armenia)	DF	Armen Manucharyan	5	1	0	0	1	0	6	1
7	(Armenia)	MF	Artem Simonyan	3	0	0	0	1	0	4	0
8	(North Macedonia)	DF	Antonio Stankov	3	0	1	0	1	0	5	0
13	(Armenia)	MF	Erik Azizyan	3	0	0	0	0	0	3	0
17	(Armenia)	MF	Artak Yedigaryan	3	0	0	0	1	0	4	0
22	(Armenia)	DF	Robert Hakobyan	2	1	1	0	0	0	3	1
23	(Armenia)	MF	Aras Özbiliz	1	0	0	0	0	0	1	0
24	(Rwanda)	DF	Salomon Nirisarike	1	0	0	0	0	0	1	0
25	(Montenegro)	GK	Andrija Dragojević	3	0	0	0	1	0	4	0
42	(Nigeria)	FW	Steven Alfred	1	0	0	0	0	0	1	0
63	(Albania)	DF	Kristi Marku	4	1	0	0	2	0	6	1
66	(Russia)	DF	Maksim Zhestokov	3	0	0	0	2	0	5	0
70	(Ukraine)	MF	Serhiy Shevchuk	0	0	0	0	1	0	1	0
77	(North Macedonia)	FW	Denis Mahmudov	2	0	0	0	0	0	2	0
79	(Armenia)	DF	Levon Vardanyan	1	0	0	0	0	0	1	0
Players who left Pyunik during the season:
10	(Armenia)	MF	Erik Vardanyan	2	1	0	0	2	1	4	2
11	(Armenia)	FW	Edgar Manucharyan	1	0	0	0	0	0	1	0
20	(Nigeria)	MF	Ugochukwu Iwu	2	0	0	0	0	0	2	0
			TOTALS	47	4	2	0	12	1	61	5
