= Aizat Sadykov =

Russian footballer

Personal information
- Full name: Aizat Airatovich Sadykov
- Date of birth: 25 June 1993 (age 33)
- Place of birth: Abakan, Russia
- Height: 1.75 m (5 ft 9 in)
- Position: Defender

Senior career*
Years	Team	Apps	(Gls)
2012	FC KAMAZ Naberezhnye Chelny	11	(0)
2013–2015	FC Gazovik Orenburg	15	(0)
2014	→ FC KAMAZ Naberezhnye Chelny (loan)	2	(0)
2015	FC Zenit-Izhevsk	3	(0)
2016–2017	FC KAMAZ Naberezhnye Chelny	29	(0)
- * Club domestic league appearances and goals

Aizat Airatovich Sadykov (Tatar: Айзат Айрат улы Садыйков, Russian: Айзат Айратович Садыков; born 25 June 1993) is a former Russian professional football player.

== Club career ==
He made his Russian Football National League debut for FC KAMAZ Naberezhnye Chelny on 2 May 2012 in a game against FC Khimki.

== Personal life ==
His younger brother Bulat Sadykov is also a footballer.
