= Bosov =

Bosov (Russian: Босов) is a Russian masculine surname; its feminine counterpart is Bosova. It may refer to the following notable people:

- Aleksandr Bosov (born 2000), Russian football player
- Dmitry Bosov (1968–2020), Russian businessman
