= Yevgeni Belonogov =

Russian footballer

Personal information
- Full name: Yevgeni Aleksandrovich Belonogov
- Date of birth: 19 April 1995 (age 31)
- Place of birth: Vladivostok, Russia
- Height: 1.75 m (5 ft 9 in)
- Position: Midfielder

Senior career*
Years	Team	Apps	(Gls)
2014–2017	FC Luch-Energiya Vladivostok	11	(0)
2017–2018	FC Zenit-Izhevsk	19	(0)
- * Club domestic league appearances and goals

Yevgeni Aleksandrovich Belonogov (Russian: Евгений Александрович Белоногов; born 19 April 1995) is a Russian former football player.

== Club career ==
He made his professional debut in the Russian Football National League for FC Luch-Energiya Vladivostok on 6 July 2014 in a game against FC SKA-Energiya Khabarovsk.
