= Serob Grigoryan =

Russian-Armenian footballer

Personal information
- Full name: Serob Davidovich Grigoryan
- Date of birth: 4 February 1995 (age 31)
- Place of birth: Vladikavkaz, Russia
- Height: 1.75 m (5 ft 9 in)
- Position: Left-back

Youth career
- 2011–2012: Akademiya Tolyatti

Senior career*
Years	Team	Apps	(Gls)
2012–2016	Krylia Sovetov Samara	0	(0)
2014	→ Shirak (loan)	12	(0)
2015	→ Zenit Penza (loan)	1	(0)
2016–2022	Pyunik	115	(1)
2019–2022	Pyunik-2	4	(0)
2019–2022	BKMA Yerevan	16	(1)
2023–2024	Alashkert	18	(0)
2024–2025	Van	23	(0)
2025–2026	Alashkert	15	(0)
2026	Gandzasar	5	(0)

International career^{‡}
2011	Armenia U17	3	(0)
2013	Armenia U19	3	(0)
2016	Armenia U21	2	(0)
2020	Armenia	4	(0)
- * Club domestic league appearances and goals as of 13:17, 20 October 2026 (UTC) ‡ National team caps and goals as of 13:17, 20 October 2026 (UTC)

Serob Davidovich Grigoryan (Armenian: Սերոբ Դավիթի Գրիգորյան; Russian: Сероб Давидович Григорян; born 4 February 1995) is a former professional footballer who plays as a left-back. Born in Russia, he plays for the Armenia national team.

== Club career ==
On 9 December 2020, Grigoryan extended his contract with Pyunik. Grigoryan left Pyunik on 3 June 2022 after his contract expired.

On 30 January 2023, Alashkert announced the signings of Grigoryan.

On 16 October 2026, Grigoryan announced his retirement from football.

== International career ==
Grigoryan made his international debut for Armenia on 5 September 2020 in the UEFA Nations League against North Macedonia.

== Career statistics ==
=== Club ===
As of match played 28 May 2022

Appearances and goals by club, season and competition
Club	Season	League			National Cup		Continental		Other		Total	
Club	Season	Division	Apps	Goals	Apps	Goals	Apps	Goals	Apps	Goals	Apps	Goals
Pyunik	2015–16	Armenian Premier League	6	0	0	0	0 (Note: Appearances in UEFA Europa League)	0	0 (Note: Appearances in Armenian Supercup)	0	6	0
Pyunik	2016–17	Armenian Premier League	28	0	5	0	1	0	-		34	0
Pyunik	2017–18	Armenian Premier League	23	0	2	0	2	0	-		27	0
Pyunik	2018–19	Armenian Premier League	9	0	1	0	6	0	-		16	0
Pyunik	2019–20	Armenian Premier League	16	0	1	0	0	0	-		17	0
Pyunik	2020–21	Armenian Premier League	20	1	1	0	-		-		21	1
Pyunik	2021–22	Armenian Premier League	13	0	1	0	-		-		14	0
Pyunik	Total		115	1	11	0	9	0	-	-	135	1
Career total			115	1	11	0	9	0	-	-	135	1

=== International ===
As of match played 18 November 2020

Armenia
Year	Apps	Goals
2020	4	0
Total	4	0

== Honours ==
Pyunik

- Armenian Premier League: 2021–22
