= Erik Vardanyan =

Armenian footballer

Personal information
- Date of birth: 7 June 1998 (age 28)
- Place of birth: Yerevan, Armenia
- Height: 1.82 m (5 ft 11 1/2 in)
- Position: Midfielder

Team information
- Current team: Urartu (Sporting Director)

Youth career
- Banants
- Barcelona

Senior career*
Years	Team	Apps	(Gls)
2015–2019	Pyunik	60	(12)
2016	→ Mika (loan)	1	(0)
2020–2022	Sochi	1	(0)
2021	→ Pyunik (loan)	12	(3)
2022	Urartu	0	(0)

International career
2016–2017	Armenia U19	4	(0)
2017–2018	Armenia U21	7	(0)
2017–2022	Armenia	10	(1)
- * Club domestic league appearances and goals

Erik Vardanyan (Armenian: Էրիկ Վարդանյան; born 7 June 1998) is an Armenian former professional footballer who played as a midfielder.

== Career ==
=== Pyunik ===
On 24 October 2019, Vardanyan extended his contract with Pyunik. On 27 October 2019, Vardanyan was sent off in a 4–2 defeat away to Ararat Yerevan, pushing the referee Henrik Nalbandyan and swearing at the opposition fans in the process. As a result, on 1 November 2019, Vardanyan was handed a six-month suspension until 30 April 2020.

=== Sochi ===
On 5 November 2019, Pyunik and PFC Sochi announced the transfer of Erik Vardanyan, with the transfer to be finalised on 1 January 2020. Erik was considered one of the most promising Armenian football talents at the time, and earned call ups to Armenia's senior national team. Even though his contract with Sochi was technically not active until 2020, he was not eligible to play for Pyunik due to disqualification, and therefore joined Sochi and started training with the squad immediately upon signing. The disqualification applied to the Russian Premier League.

==== Pyunik loan ====
On 10 July 2021, Pyunik announced the return of Vardanyan to the club on loan from Sochi.

=== Urartu ===
On 17 February 2022, Vardanyan signed with Urartu. On 29 December 2022, Vardanyan announced his retirement from football due to a knee injury, and that he would become a football scout for Urartu.

Since 2024, Vardanyan has held the post of sports director of Urartu.

== Career statistics ==
=== Club ===
As of match played 18 May 2022

Appearances and goals by club, season and competition
Club	Season	League			National Cup		Continental		Other		Total	
Club	Season	Division	Apps	Goals	Apps	Goals	Apps	Goals	Apps	Goals	Apps	Goals
Pyunik	2015–16	Armenian Premier League	0	0	0	0	0	0	-		0	0
Pyunik	2016–17	Armenian Premier League	10	0	1	0	0	0	-		11	0
Pyunik	2017–18	Armenian Premier League	20	4	2	0	1	0	-		23	1
Pyunik	2018–19	Armenian Premier League	21	8	0	0	0	0	-		21	8
Pyunik	2019–20	Armenian Premier League	9	0	0	0	5	1	-		14	1
Pyunik	Total		60	12	3	0	6	1	-	-	69	13
Mika (loan)	2015–16	Armenian Premier League	1	0	0	0	–		–		1	0
Sochi	2019–20	Russian Premier League	0	0	0	0	-		-		0	0
Sochi	2020–21	Russian Premier League	1	0	0	0	-		-		1	0
Sochi	2021–22	Russian Premier League	0	0	0	0	0	0	-		0	0
Sochi	Total		1	0	0	0	0	0	-	-	1	0
Pyunik (loan)	2021–22	Armenian Premier League	11	3	1	0	–		–		12	3
Urartu	2021–22	Armenian Premier League	6	0	1	0	0	0	-		7	0
Urartu	2022–23	Armenian Premier League	0	0	0	0	-		-		0	0
Urartu	Total		6	0	1	0	0	0	-	-	7	0
Career total			79	15	5	0	6	1	-	-	90	16

=== International ===
Armenia national team
Year	Apps	Goals
2017	1	1
2018	1	0
2019	2	0
2021	4	0
2022	2	0
Total	10	1

Statistics accurate as of match played 29 March 2022

=== International goals ===
As of match played 3 September 2021

#	Date	Venue	Opponent	Score	Result	Competition	Ref
1.	9 November 2017	Republican Stadium, Yerevan, Armenia	Belarus	4–1	4–1	Friendly	
