= Denis Magadiyev =

Russian footballer

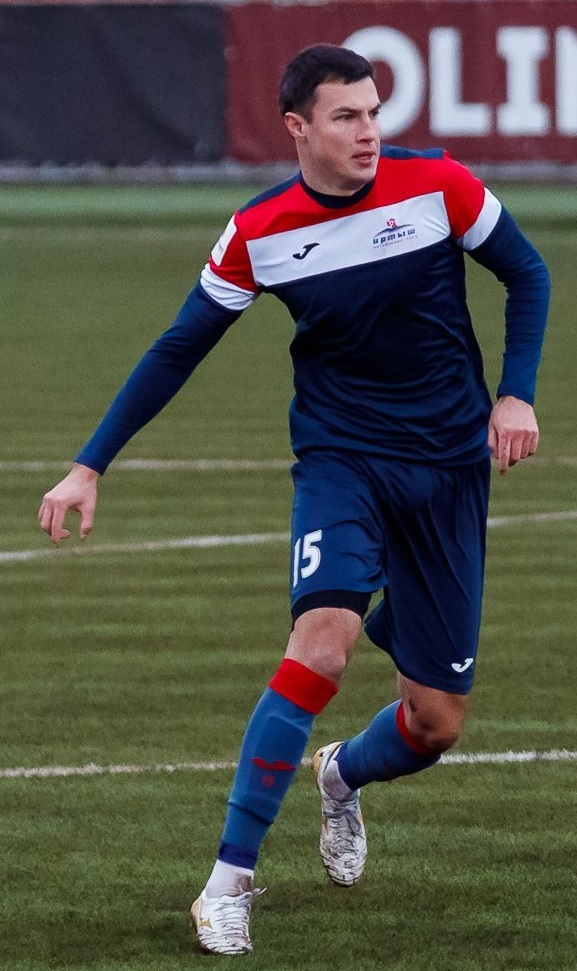
- Magadiyev with Irtysh Omsk in 2020

Personal information
- Full name: Denis Ulfatovich Magadiyev
- Date of birth: 18 January 1992 (age 34)
- Place of birth: Sterlitamak, Bashkortostan, Russia
- Height: 1.88 m (6 ft 2 in)
- Positions: Defender; midfielder

Team information
- Current team: Izhevsk
- Number: 22

Senior career*
Years	Team	Apps	(Gls)
2008–2013	Akademiya Tolyatti	77	(6)
2013–2015	Yenisey Krasnoyarsk	30	(2)
2016	Syzran-2003	9	(1)
2016–2017	Sokol Saratov	31	(0)
2017–2019	Shinnik Yaroslavl	46	(1)
2019–2020	Luch Vladivostok	22	(1)
2020	Akron Tolyatti	6	(0)
2020–2021	Irtysh Omsk	27	(2)
2021–2023	Tyumen	16	(2)
2023–2024	Atom Novovoronezh (amateur)		
2025	Izhevsk (amateur)		
2026–	Izhevsk	16	(1)

International career
2010	Russia U-18	2	(0)
2011	Russia U-19	1	(0)
- * Club domestic league appearances and goals as of 1 November 2026

Denis Ulfatovich Magadiyev (Russian: Денис Ульфатович Магадиев; born 18 January 1992) is a Russian professional football player who plays for Izhevsk.

== Club career ==
He made his Russian Football National League debut for Yenisey Krasnoyarsk on 25 May 2013 in a game against Shinnik Yaroslavl.
