= Vitali Stezhko =

Russian footballer

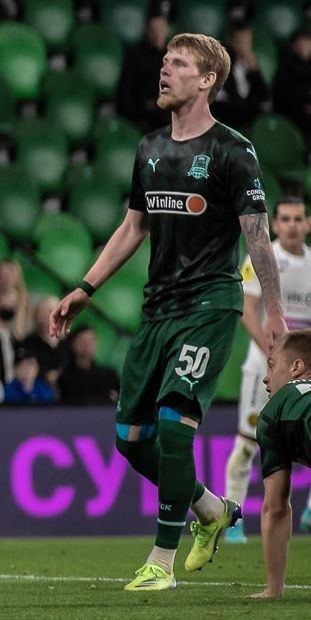
- Stezhko with Krasnodar in 2022

Personal information
- Full name: Vitali Yuryevich Stezhko
- Date of birth: 29 January 1997 (age 29)
- Place of birth: Buzinovskaya, Russia
- Height: 1.90 m (6 ft 3 in)
- Position: Centre-back

Team information
- Current team: Ural Yekaterinburg (on loan from Krasnodar)
- Number: 5

Youth career
- DYuSSh Vyselki
- –2018: Krasnodar

Senior career*
| Years | Team | Apps | (Gls) |
| 2017 | Krasnodar | 0 | (0) |
| 2014–2022 | Krasnodar-2 | 111 | (6) |
| 2018–2019 | → Pyunik (loan) | 20 | (1) |
| 2020 | Krasnodar-3 | 1 | (1) |
| 2022 | Krasnodar | 2 | (0) |
| 2022–2024 | Yenisey Krasnoyarsk | 44 | (3) |
| 2024–2025 | Chernomorets Novorossiysk | 30 | (2) |
| 2025– | Krasnodar | 0 | (0) |
| 2026– | → Ural Yekaterinburg (loan) | 0 | (0) |

International career^{‡}
| 2015 | Russia U-18 | 2 | (0) |
| 2015–2016 | Russia U-19 | 7 | (0) |
- * Club domestic league appearances and goals as of 24 May 2025 ‡ National team caps and goals as of 29 March 2016

Vitali Yuryevich Stezhko (Russian: Виталий Юрьевич Стежко; born 29 January 1997) is a Russian football player who plays for Ural Yekaterinburg on loan from Krasnodar.

== Club career ==
He made his debut in the Russian Professional Football League for Krasnodar-2 on 28 March 2015 in a game against Torpedo Armavir. He made his Russian Football National League debut for Krasnodar-2 on 25 August 2019 in a game against Neftekhimik Nizhnekamsk.

He made his Russian Premier League debut for Krasnodar on 15 May 2022 against CSKA Moscow.

On 16 June 2025, Stezhko returned to Krasnodar on a three-year contract. On 3 September 2026, he was loaned by Ural Yekaterinburg.

== Career statistics ==
As of 5 November 2025

| Club | Season | League | | | Cup | | Continental | | Other | | Total | |
| Club | Season | Division | Apps | Goals | Apps | Goals | Apps | Goals | Apps | Goals | Apps | Goals |
|---|---|---|---|---|---|---|---|---|---|---|---|---|
| Krasnodar-2 | 2014–15 | Russian Second League | 7 | 0 | – | | – | | – | | 7 | 0 |
| Krasnodar-2 | 2015–16 | Russian Second League | 18 | 1 | – | | – | | – | | 18 | 1 |
| Krasnodar-2 | 2016–17 | Russian Second League | 19 | 1 | – | | – | | 4 (Note: Appearances in FNL Cup) | 0 | 23 | 1 |
| Krasnodar-2 | 2017–18 | Russian Second League | 26 | 3 | – | | – | | 1 | 0 | 27 | 3 |
| Krasnodar-2 | 2019–20 | Russian First League | 10 | 0 | – | | – | | – | | 10 | 0 |
| Krasnodar-2 | 2020–21 | Russian First League | 25 | 0 | – | | – | | – | | 25 | 0 |
| Krasnodar-2 | 2021–22 | Russian First League | 6 | 1 | – | | – | | – | | 6 | 1 |
| Krasnodar-2 | Total | | 111 | 6 | 0 | 0 | 0 | 0 | 6 | 0 | 116 | 6 |
| Krasnodar | 2017–18 | Russian Premier League | 0 | 0 | 0 | 0 | 0 | 0 | – | | 0 | 0 |
| Krasnodar | 2021–22 | Russian Premier League | 2 | 0 | 0 | 0 | – | | – | | 2 | 0 |
| Krasnodar | Total | | 2 | 0 | 0 | 0 | 0 | 0 | 0 | 0 | 2 | 0 |
| Riga (loan) | 2018 | Latvian Higher League | – | | – | | – | | 1 | 0 | 1 | 0 |
| Pyunik (loan) | 2018–19 | Armenian Premier League | 20 | 1 | 1 | 0 | 2 (Note: Appearances in UEFA Europa League) | 0 | 4 | 1 | 27 | 2 |
| Krasnodar-3 | 2020–21 | Russian Second League | 1 | 1 | – | | – | | – | | 1 | 1 |
| Yenisey Krasnoyarsk | 2022–23 | Russian First League | 18 | 0 | – | | – | | 2 (Note: Appearances in promotion play-offs) | 0 | 20 | 0 |
| Yenisey Krasnoyarsk | 2023–24 | Russian First League | 26 | 3 | 1 | 0 | – | | – | | 27 | 3 |
| Yenisey Krasnoyarsk | Total | | 44 | 3 | 1 | 0 | 0 | 0 | 2 | 0 | 47 | 3 |
| Chernomorets Novorossiysk | 2024–25 | Russian First League | 30 | 2 | 0 | 0 | – | | – | | 30 | 2 |
| Krasnodar | 2025–26 | Russian Premier League | 0 | 0 | 3 | 0 | – | | – | | 3 | 0 |
| Career total | | | 208 | 13 | 5 | 0 | 2 | 0 | 12 | 1 | 227 | 14 |
