= Kristi Marku =

Albanian footballer (born 1995)

Personal information
- Date of birth: 13 April 1995 (age 31)
- Place of birth: Durrës, Albania
- Height: 1.90 m (6 ft 3 in)
- Position: Centre-back

Youth career
- 2010–2012: Teuta

Senior career*
| Years | Team | Apps | (Gls) |
| 2012–2013 | Teuta | 9 | (0) |
| 2013–2014 | Rosengård | 6 | (1) |
| 2014–2015 | Budapest Honvéd | 8 | (0) |
| 2016–2017 | Flamurtari | 14 | (0) |
| 2017 | Partizani | 1 | (0) |
| 2017–2018 | Lushnja | 21 | (1) |
| 2018–2019 | Ferizaj | 15 | (0) |
| 2019–2020 | Pyunik | 16 | (1) |
| 2021 | Narva Trans | 11 | (1) |
| 2021–2022 | Kukësi | 20 | (0) |
| 2022–2023 | Gloria Buzău | 11 | (0) |
| 2023–2024 | Focșani | 19 | (4) |
| 2024–2025 | Gloria Bistrița | 0 | (0) |

International career
| 2009 | Albania U15 | 2 | (0) |
| 2011–2012 | Albania U17 | 8 | (1) |
| 2012–2014 | Albania U19 | 4 | (0) |
| 2014–2016 | Albania U21 | 3 | (0) |
- * Club domestic league appearances and goals as of 12:19, 16 August 2025 (UTC)

Kristi Marku (born 13 April 1995) is an Albanian professional footballer who plays as a centre-back.

== International career ==
=== Under-21 ===
He received his first Albania under-21 call up by Skënder Gega in September 2014 for a friendly against Romania on 8 October, where he was an unused substitute in the 3–1 loss. He was called up in March for Albania's opening 2017 European Under-21 Championship qualifier against Liechtenstein on 28 March 2015.

== Career statistics ==
As of match played 20 October 2019

Appearances and goals by club, season and competition
| Club | Season | League | | | National cup (Note: Includes Albanian Cup) | | League cup (Note: Includes Ligakupa) | | Continental | | Other | | Total | |
| Club | Season | Division | Apps | Goals | Apps | Goals | Apps | Goals | Apps | Goals | Apps | Goals | Apps | Goals |
|---|---|---|---|---|---|---|---|---|---|---|---|---|---|---|
| Honvéd | 2014–15 | Nemzeti Bajnokság I | 8 | 0 | 0 | 0 | 5 | 1 | — | | — | | 13 | 1 |
| Flamurtari | 2015–16 | Kategoria Superiore | 10 | 0 | 1 | 0 | — | | — | | — | | 11 | 0 |
| Flamurtari | 2016–17 | Kategoria Superiore | 4 | 0 | 2 | 0 | — | | — | | — | | 6 | 0 |
| Flamurtari | Total | | 14 | 0 | 3 | 0 | — | | — | | — | | 17 | 0 |
| Partizani | 2016–17 | Kategoria Superiore | 1 | 0 | 0 | 0 | — | | 0 | 0 | — | | 1 | 0 |
| Partizani | 2017–18 | Kategoria Superiore | 0 | 0 | 0 | 0 | — | | 0 | 0 | — | | 0 | 0 |
| Partizani | Total | | 1 | 0 | 0 | 0 | — | | 0 | 0 | — | | 1 | 0 |
| Lushnja | 2017–18 | Kategoria Superiore | 21 | 1 | 2 | 0 | — | | — | | — | | 23 | 1 |
| Ferizaj | 2018–19 | Football Superleague of Kosovo | 15 | 0 | | | — | | — | | — | | 15 | 0 |
| Pyunik | 2018–19 | Armenian Premier League | 11 | 1 | 0 | 0 | — | | 0 | 0 | — | | 11 | 1 |
| Pyunik | 2019–20 | Armenian Premier League | 5 | 0 | 0 | 0 | — | | 5 (Note: Appearances in UEFA Europa League) | 0 | — | | 10 | 0 |
| Pyunik | Total | | 16 | 1 | 0 | 0 | 5 | 0 | — | | — | | 21 | 1 |
| Career total | | | 75 | 2 | 5 | 0 | 5 | 1 | 5 | 0 | — | | 90 | 3 |
