= Artur Miranyan =

Armenian footballer (born 1995)

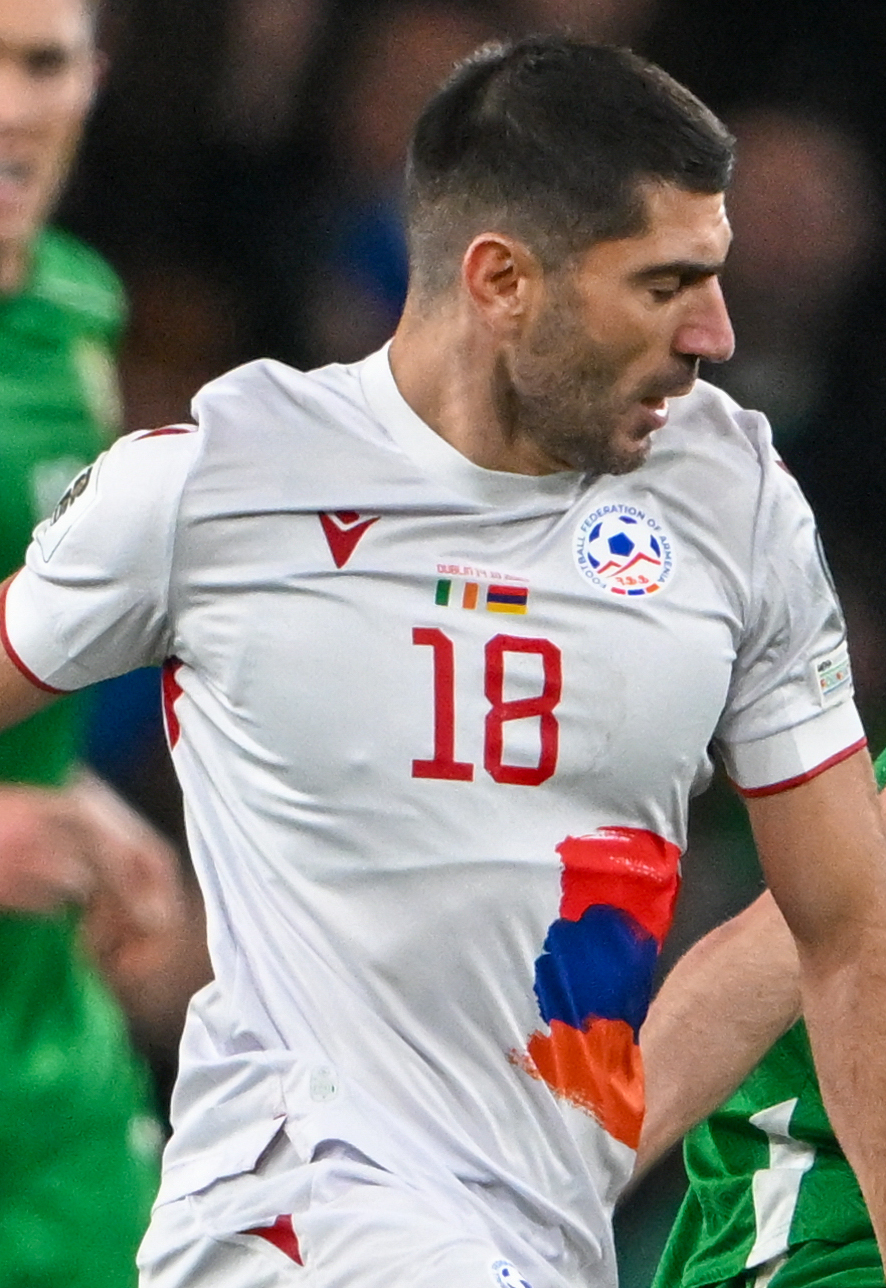
- Miranyan with Armenia in 2025

Personal information
- Full name: Artur Ashotovych Miranyan
- Date of birth: 27 December 1995 (age 30)
- Place of birth: Yerevan, Armenia
- Height: 1.79 m (5 ft 10 in)
- Position: Forward

Team information
- Current team: Ironi Tiberias
- Number: 99

Youth career
- 2008–2014: Shakhtar Donetsk

Senior career*
| Years | Team | Apps | (Gls) |
| 2014–2015 | Vardar | 12 | (0) |
| 2017 | Pyunik | 10 | (1) |
| 2019–2020 | Pyunik | 28 | (11) |
| 2021–2022 | Urartu | 32 | (13) |
| 2023 | Alashkert | 16 | (3) |
| 2023–2024 | Noah | 36 | (23) |
| 2024–2025 | Universitatea Cluj | 21 | (3) |
| 2025–2026 | Bnei Sakhnin | 29 | (5) |
| 2026– | Ironi Tiberias | 2 | (0) |

International career^{‡}
| 2011–2012 | Ukraine U17 | 14 | (3) |
| 2013 | Ukraine U18 | 8 | (5) |
| 2013 | Ukraine U19 | 6 | (5) |
| 2014–2015 | Armenia U21 | 8 | (1) |
| 2019– | Armenia | 25 | (1) |
- * Club domestic league appearances and goals as of 19 September 2026 ‡ National team caps and goals as of 15 November 2026

Artur Ashotovych Miranyan (Armenian: Արթուր Աշոտի Միրանյան; Ukrainian: Артур Ашотович Міранян; born 27 December 1995) is an Armenian professional footballer who plays as a forward for Israeli Premier League club Ironi Tiberias and the Armenia national team.

== Club career ==
On 17 September 2013, Miranyan became a player who scored the first goal for Shakhtar Donetsk in the 2013–14 UEFA Youth League in its inaugural season. On 29 August 2014, Vardar announced the signing of Miranyan. He left Vardar on 16 September 2015.

On 28 February 2021, Urartu announced the signing of Miranyan. On 6 July 2022, Miranyan left Urartu.

On 5 February 2023, Alashkert announced the signing of Miranyan. On 8 July 2023 he left Alashkert.

On 25 July 2023, Noah announced the signing of Miranyan.

On 20 September 2024, Universitatea Cluj announced the signing of Miranyan. He left the club in June 2025.

On 24 July 2025, Bnei Sakhnin announced the signing of Miranyan.

== International career ==
Miranyan started his international career by playing for various Ukrainian national junior teams. He made his debut at the 2012 UEFA European Under-17 Championship during its qualification game against Belgium team which Ukraine won 2:0.

Miranyan made his international debut for Armenia on 12 October 2019 in a UEFA Euro 2020 qualifying match against Liechtenstein, which finished as a 1–1 away draw.

== Career statistics ==
=== Club ===
As of match played 11 May 2025

Appearances and goals by club, season and competition
| Club | Season | League | | | National cup | | Continental | | Other | | Total | |
| Club | Season | Division | Apps | Goals | Apps | Goals | Apps | Goals | Apps | Goals | Apps | Goals |
|---|---|---|---|---|---|---|---|---|---|---|---|---|
| Vardar | 2014–15 | 1. MFL | 12 | 0 | 0 | 0 | – | | – | | 12 | 0 |
| Pyunik | 2017–18 | Armenian Premier League | 10 | 1 | 2 | 0 | – | | – | | 12 | 1 |
| Pyunik | 2018–19 | Armenian Premier League | 15 | 5 | – | | – | | – | | 15 | 5 |
| Pyunik | 2019–20 | Armenian Premier League | 13 | 6 | 1 | 0 | 6 | 3 | – | | 20 | 9 |
| Pyunik | Total | | 28 | 11 | 1 | 0 | 6 | 3 | 0 | 0 | 35 | 11 |
| Urartu | 2020–21 | Armenian Premier League | 10 | 3 | 1 | 0 | – | | – | | 11 | 3 |
| Urartu | 2021–22 | Armenian Premier League | 22 | 10 | 3 | 1 | 2 | 0 | – | | 27 | 11 |
| Urartu | Total | | 32 | 13 | 4 | 1 | 2 | 0 | –"|– | | 38 | 14 |
| Alashkert | 2022–23 | Armenian Premier League | 16 | 3 | – | | – | | – | | 12 | 1 |
| Noah | 2023–24 | Armenian Premier League | 36 | 23 | 2 | 1 | – | | – | | 38 | 24 |
| Universitatea Cluj | 2024–25 | Liga I | 21 | 3 | – | | – | | – | | 21 | 3 |
| Career total | | | 155 | 54 | 9 | 2 | 8 | 3 | 0 | 0 | 172 | 59 |

=== International ===
As of match played 15 November 2026

Armenia
| Year | Apps | Goals |
|---|---|---|
| 2019 | 1 | 0 |
| 2021 | 2 | 0 |
| 2023 | 2 | 0 |
| 2024 | 7 | 1 |
| 2025 | 6 | 0 |
| 2026 | 7 | 0 |
| Total | 25 | 1 |

Scores and results list Armenia's goal tally first, score column indicates score after each Miranyan goal.

List of international goals scored by Artur Miranyan
| No. | Date | Venue | Opponent | Score | Result | Competition |
|---|---|---|---|---|---|---|
| 1 | 17 November 2024 | Skonto Stadium, Riga, Latvia | Latvia | 2–1 | 2–1 | 2024–25 UEFA Nations League C |

== Honours ==
Vardar

- 1. MFL: 2014–15

Urartu

- Armenian Cup runner-up: 2021–22

Individual

- Armenian Premier League top scorer: 2023–24 (23 goals)
