= Bulat Sadykov =

Russian footballer

Personal information
- Full name: Bulat Ayratovich Sadykov
- Date of birth: 9 May 1995 (age 31)
- Place of birth: Naberezhnye Chelny, Russia
- Height: 1.83 m (6 ft 0 in)
- Position: Defender

Team information
- Current team: Izhevsk
- Number: 44

Senior career*
Years	Team	Apps	(Gls)
2011–2012	KAMAZ-2 Naberezhnye Chelny		
2012	KAMAZ Naberezhnye Chelny	0	(0)
2013–2014	Gazovik Orenburg	0	(0)
2014–2015	Nosta Novotroitsk	18	(1)
2015–2016	Zenit-Izhevsk	23	(1)
2016–2019	KAMAZ Naberezhnye Chelny	45	(1)
2019–2020	Zvezda Perm	16	(0)
2020–2021	Akron Tolyatti	30	(1)
2021	Dynamo Vladivostok	15	(2)
2022	KAMAZ Naberezhnye Chelny	9	(0)
2022–2026	Irtysh Omsk	110	(3)
2026–	Izhevsk	13	(0)
- * Club domestic league appearances and goals as of 1 November 2026

Bulat Ayratovich Sadykov (Russian: Булат Айратович Садыков; born 9 May 1995) is a Russian football player who plays for Izhevsk.

== Club career ==
He made his debut in the Russian Football National League for Akron Tolyatti on 1 August 2020 in a game against Fakel Voronezh, as a starter.

== Personal life ==
His older brother Aizat Sadykov also played professionally.
