= Denis Voynov =

Russian footballer

Personal information
- Full name: Denis Vasilyevich Voynov
- Date of birth: 1 March 1990 (age 36)
- Place of birth: Fryazino, Russian SFSR
- Height: 1.76 m (5 ft 9 in)
- Position: Midfielder

Youth career
- 2006: FC Lokomotiv Moscow

Senior career*
Years	Team	Apps	(Gls)
2007–2013	FC Lokomotiv Moscow	0	(0)
2010–2012	→ FC Lokomotiv-2 Moscow (loan)	72	(8)
2013–2015	FC Torpedo Moscow	12	(1)
2014	→ FC Fakel Voronezh (loan)	0	(0)
2015	FC MITOS Novocherkassk	10	(0)
2016–2017	PFC Spartak Nalchik	40	(1)
2017–2018	FC Avangard Kursk	20	(2)
2018	FC Pyunik	12	(1)
2019	FC Murom	22	(0)

International career
2009	Russia U-19	4	(0)
2012	Russia U-21	6	(0)
- * Club domestic league appearances and goals

Denis Vasilyevich Voynov (Russian: Денис Васильевич Войнов; born 1 March 1990) is a Russian former football midfielder.

== Career ==
Voynov made his professional debut for FC Lokomotiv Moscow on 15 July 2009 in the Russian Cup game against FC SKA-Energiya Khabarovsk.
