= Denis Talalay =

Russian footballer

Personal information
- Full name: Denis Maksimovich Talalay
- Date of birth: 10 February 1992 (age 34)
- Place of birth: Moscow, Russia
- Height: 1.80 m (5 ft 11 in)
- Position: Midfielder

Senior career*
Years	Team	Apps	(Gls)
2010	FC Moscow (amateur)		
2011	FC Stolitsa Moscow		
2013–2015	FC MITOS Novocherkassk	51	(6)
2015	FC Mika	12	(1)
2016–2017	FC Zenit-Izhevsk	18	(3)
2017–2018	FC Khimki	38	(1)
2018	→ FC Khimki-M	7	(0)
2019	FC Pyunik	14	(2)
2019–2021	FC Tom Tomsk	54	(0)
2021–2022	FC Neftekhimik Nizhnekamsk	14	(0)
2022–2023	FC Volgar Astrakhan	26	(0)
2023–2024	FC Neftekhimik Nizhnekamsk	14	(0)
2024–2025	FC Tyumen	17	(0)
- * Club domestic league appearances and goals as of 24 May 2025

Denis Maksimovich Talalay (Russian: Денис Максимович Талалай; born 10 February 1992) is a Russian football midfielder.

== Club career ==
He made his debut in the Russian Second Division for FC MITOS Novocherkassk on 17 August 2013 in a game against FC Gazprom transgaz Stavropol Ryzdvyany.

He made his Russian Football National League debut for FC Khimki on 8 July 2017 in a game against FC Rotor Volgograd.

Talalay left FC Pyunik at the end of his contract on 14 June 2019.
