= Aleksandr Bosov =

Russian footballer

Personal information
- Full name: Aleksandr Sergeyevich Bosov
- Date of birth: 15 August 2000 (age 26)
- Place of birth: Tolyatti, Russia
- Height: 1.77 m (5 ft 9 1/2 in)
- Position: Midfielder

Team information
- Current team: Izhevsk
- Number: 63

Senior career*
Years	Team	Apps	(Gls)
2018	Krylia Sovetov-2 Samara	1	(1)
2018–2020	Krylia Sovetov Samara	0	(0)
2020–2022	Akron Tolyatti	52	(0)
2022–2024	Irtysh Omsk	46	(2)
2024	Lada-Tolyatti	13	(0)
2025	Izhevsk (amateur)		
2026–	Izhevsk	30	(0)
- * Club domestic league appearances and goals as of 1 November 2026

Aleksandr Sergeyevich Bosov (Russian: Александр Сергеевич Босов; born 15 August 2000) is a Russian football player who plays for Izhevsk.

== Club career ==
He made his debut in the Russian Football National League for Akron Tolyatti on 30 August 2020 in a game against Baltika Kaliningrad.
