= Lassina Dao (footballer, born 1996) =

Ivorian professional footballer

Personal information
- Full name: Lassina Jean Apollinaire Junior Dao
- Date of birth: 20 December 1996 (age 29)
- Place of birth: Sud-Comoe, Ivory Coast
- Height: 1.77 m (5 ft 9 1/2 in)
- Position: Forward

Senior career*
Years	Team	Apps	(Gls)
2015	Saxan Gagauz Yeri	6	(1)
2015–2016	Zaria Bălți	22	(4)
2016	Aktobe	5	(1)
2016	Hapoel Ashkelon	9	(3)
2017	Bnei Sakhnin	5	(0)
2017–2018	Gomel	37	(0)
2019	Pyunik	6	(1)
- * Club domestic league appearances and goals as of 1 June 2019

Lassina Jean Apollinaire Junior Dao (20 December 1996) is an Ivorian former professional footballer who played as a forward.

== Career ==
In June 2016, Dao signed for FC Aktobe, but left a couple of months later.

On 2 April 2019, Dao signed for Pyunik. On 1 June 2019, Dao was released by Pyunik.

== Career statistics ==
=== Club ===
As of match played 26 May 2019

Appearances and goals by club, season and competition
Club	Season	League			National Cup		League Cup		Continental		Other		Total	
Club	Season	Division	Apps	Goals	Apps	Goals	Apps	Goals	Apps	Goals	Apps	Goals	Apps	Goals
Saxan Gagauz Yeri	2014–15	Divizia Națională	6	1	0	0	–		–		–		6	1
Saxan Gagauz Yeri	2015–16	Divizia Națională	0	0	0	0	–		2	0	–		2	0
Saxan Gagauz Yeri	Total		6	1	0	0	-	-	2	0	-	-	8	1
Zaria Bălți	2015–16	Divizia Națională	22	4	3	0	–		–		–		25	4
Aktobe	2016	Kazakhstan Premier League	5	1	0	0	–		2	0	–		7	1
Hapoel Ashkelon	2016–17	Israeli Premier League	9	3	0	0	0	0	–		–		9	3
Bnei Sakhnin	2016–17	Israeli Premier League	5	0	0	0	0	0	–		–		5	0
Gomel	2017	Belarusian Premier League	12	0	0	0	–		–		–		12	0
Gomel	2018	Belarusian Premier League	25	0	1	1	–		–		–		26	1
Gomel	Total		37	0	1	1	-	-	0	0	-	-	38	1
Pyunik	2018–19	Armenian Premier League	6	1	0	0	–		0	0	–		6	1
Career total			90	10	4	1	0	0	4	0	0	0	98	11
