= Albert Bogatyryov =

Russian football player

Personal information
- Full name: Albert Aslanovich Bogatyryov
- Date of birth: 14 June 1994 (age 32)
- Place of birth: Cherkessk, Russia
- Height: 1.76 m (5 ft 9 in)
- Position: Midfielder

Youth career
- Spartak Nalchik

Senior career*
Years	Team	Apps	(Gls)
2012–2013	Olimpia Bălţi	42	(3)
2014–2015	Mashuk-KMV	31	(8)
2015–2017	Spartak Nalchik	51	(3)
2017–2018	Tyumen	31	(7)
2018	Pyunik	0	(0)
2019	Rostov-on-Don	15	(1)
2020	Kyzyltash Bakhchisaray		
2020–2021	Spartak Nalchik	29	(3)
2022	Druzhba Maykop	12	(0)
- * Club domestic league appearances and goals

Albert Aslanovich Bogatyryov (Russian: Альберт Асланович Богатырёв; born 14 June 1994) is a Russian former football player.

== Club career ==
He made his professional debut in the Russian Professional Football League for FC Mashuk-KMV Pyatigorsk on 10 April 2014 in a game against FC Krasnodar-2.

He made his Russian Football National League debut for PFC Spartak Nalchik on 11 July 2016 in a game against FC Kuban Krasnodar.
