= Vyacheslav Dmitriyev =

Russian professional footballer

Personal information
- Full name: Vyacheslav Sergeyevich Dmitriyev
- Date of birth: 28 May 1990 (age 36)
- Place of birth: Vyazma, Russian SFSR
- Height: 1.80 m (5 ft 11 in)
- Position: Defender

Youth career
- FShM Moscow

Senior career*
Years	Team	Apps	(Gls)
2006	Torpedo Moscow	0	(0)
2007	FC Vyazma		
2008	Torpedo Moscow	25	(0)
2009	Moscow	0	(0)
2010–2012	Dynamo Bryansk	22	(1)
2012–2013	Vityaz Podolsk	19	(0)
2013	Zimbru Chișinău	10	(0)
2014–2017	FC Rosich Moscow		
2018–2019	Pyunik	23	(0)
2019	Ararat Moscow	15	(2)
2021–2022	Kolomna	26	(0)

International career
2008–2009	Russia U-19	7	(3)
2011	Russia U-21	1	(0)
- * Club domestic league appearances and goals

Vyacheslav Sergeyevich Dmitriyev (Russian: Вячеслав Серге́евич Дмитриев; born 28 May 1990) is a Russian former professional footballer.

== Club career ==
Dmitriyev made his professional debut in the Russian Football National League in 2008 for FC Torpedo Moscow.

On 1 June 2019, Dmitriyev was released by FC Pyunik.
