= Andrija Dragojević =

Montenegrin footballer

Personal information
- Full name: Andrija Dragojević
- Date of birth: 25 December 1991 (age 34)
- Place of birth: Titograd, SFR Yugoslavia
- Height: 1.93 m (6 ft 4 in)
- Position: Goalkeeper

Team information
- Current team: Urartu
- Number: 33

Youth career
- OFK Beograd

Senior career*
Years	Team	Apps	(Gls)
2010–2013	OFK Beograd	2	(0)
2010–2011	→ Dinamo Vranje (loan)	1	(0)
2012	→ Mladenovac (loan)	7	(0)
2013	→ Lovćen (loan)	14	(0)
2013–2014	Lovćen	10	(0)
2014–2015	Velež Mostar	16	(0)
2015–2016	Vllaznia	30	(0)
2016–2017	Karmiotissa	21	(0)
2017	Grbalj	15	(0)
2018	Alashkert	0	(0)
2018	→ Ararat Yerevan (loan)	11	(0)
2018–2020	Pyunik	45	(0)
2018	Alashkert	0	(0)
2021–2022	Dečić	13	(0)
2022–2023	Onisilos Sotira	27	(0)
2023–2024	EN Paralimni	26	(0)
2024–2025	West Armenia	20	(0)
2025–	Urartu	2	(0)
- * Club domestic league appearances and goals as of 11 June 2026

Andrija Dragojević (Montenegrin Cyrillic: Андрија Драгојевић; born 25 December 1991) is a Montenegrin footballer who plays as a goalkeeper for Armenian side Urartu.

== Club career ==
Born in Titograd, he played in the youth team of OFK Beograd before making his debut as senior playing on loan with Dinamo Vranje in 2010–11 Serbian First League. He then switched to play in same league but on loan at OFK Mladenovac and then with Montenegrin First League side Lovćen. He made 3 appearances with OFK Beograd first-team in the first half of the 2012–13 Serbian SuperLiga. During the winter break of the 2013–14 season he left OFK Beograd and joined Lovćen permanently.

On 13 February 2014, Dragojević signed a one-and-a-half-year contract with Velež Mostar playing in the Bosnian Premier League. On 30 August 2015, Dragojević moved clubs again but this time to Albanian Superliga club Vllaznia.

On 14 February 2018, Dragojević signed for Armenian Premier League club FC Alashkert. On 1 March Alashkert announced that Dragojević had moved to fellow Armenian Premier League club Ararat Yerevan on loan for the remainder of the season.

On 24 June 2018, FC Pyunik announced the signing of Dragojević. On 5 August 2020, Dragojević left Pyunik by mutual consent.

On 26 June 2025, Urartu announced the signing of Dragojević.

== International career ==
On the national team level, Dragojević represented Montenegro at U-19 level.

== Honours ==
Lovćen

- Montenegrin Cup: 2013–14
