= Yevgeni Kobozev =

Russian footballer

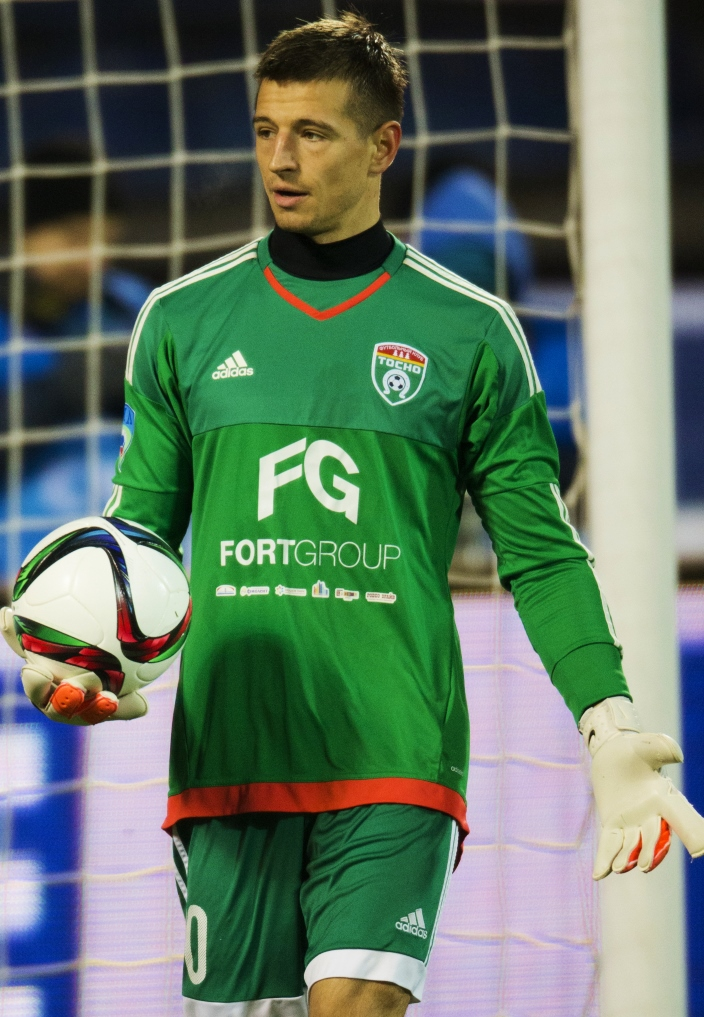

Personal information
- Full name: Yevgeni Vyacheslavovich Kobozev
- Date of birth: 11 January 1990 (age 36)
- Place of birth: Ryazan, Russian SFSR
- Height: 1.86 m (6 ft 1 in)
- Position: Goalkeeper

Senior career*
Years	Team	Apps	(Gls)
2006–2008	Torpedo Moscow	0	(0)
2009–2010	Torpedo-ZIL Moscow	36	(0)
2011–2013	Ufa	58	(0)
2013–2015	Terek Grozny	0	(0)
2014–2015	→ Krylia Sovetov (loan)	0	(0)
2015	Tosno	5	(0)
2016	VPS	33	(0)
2017	Jönköpings Södra	5	(0)
2018–2019	Pyunik	4	(0)
2020	Ararat Yerevan	3	(0)
2021	Luki-Energiya Velikiye Luki	3	(0)
- * Club domestic league appearances and goals

Yevgeni Vyacheslavovich Kobozev (Russian: Евгений Вячеславович Кобозев; born 11 January 1990) is a Russian former professional footballer.

== Career ==
He made his Russian Football National League debut for FC Ufa on 9 July 2012 in a game against PFC Spartak Nalchik.

On 24 June 2018, FC Pyunik announced the signing of Kobozev. On 6 December 2019, Kobozev was one of five players released by mutual consent from FC Pyunik.

On 29 January 2020, Ararat Yerevan announced the signing of Kobozev.

During the summer of 2021, Kobozev signed for Luki-Energiya Velikiye Luki.

== Career statistics ==
As of 13 May 2025

Appearances and goals by club, season and competition
Club	Season	League			National cup (Note: Includes Russian Cup, Suomen Cup and Svenska Cupen)		Europe		Total	
Club	Season	Division	Apps	Goals	Apps	Goals	Apps	Goals	Apps	Goals
Torpedo-ZIL Moscow	2010	Russian Second League	28	0	2	0	–		30	0
Ufa	2011–12	Russian Second League	34	0	1	0	–		35	0
Ufa	2012–13	Russian First League	24	0	0	0	–		24	0
Ufa	Total		58	0	1	0	0	0	59	0
Terek Grozny	2013–14	Russian Premier League	0	0	0	0	–		0	0
Krylia Sovetov (loan)	2014–15	Russian First League	0	0	0	0	–		0	0
Tosno	2015–16	Russian First League	5	0	1	0	–		6	0
VPS	2016	Veikkausliiga	33	0	0	0	–		33	0
Jönköpings Södra	2017	Allsvenskan	5	0	1	0	–		6	0
Pyunik	2018–19	Armenian Premier League	4	0	0	0	3 (Note: Appearances in UEFA Europa League)	0	7	0
Pyunik	2019–20	Armenian Premier League	0	0	0	0	0	0	0	0
Pyunik	Total		4	0	0	0	3	0	7	0
Pyunik II	2019–20	Armenian First League	4	0	–		–		4	0
Ararat Yerevan	2019–20	Armenian Premier League	3	0	–		–		3	0
Ararat Yerevan II	2019–20	Armenian First League	2	0	–		–		2	0
Luki-Energiya	2021–22	Russian Second League	3	0	0	0	–		3	0
Career total			145	0	5	0	3	0	153	0
