= Muhammed Usman Edu =

Nigerian footballer

Muhammed Usman
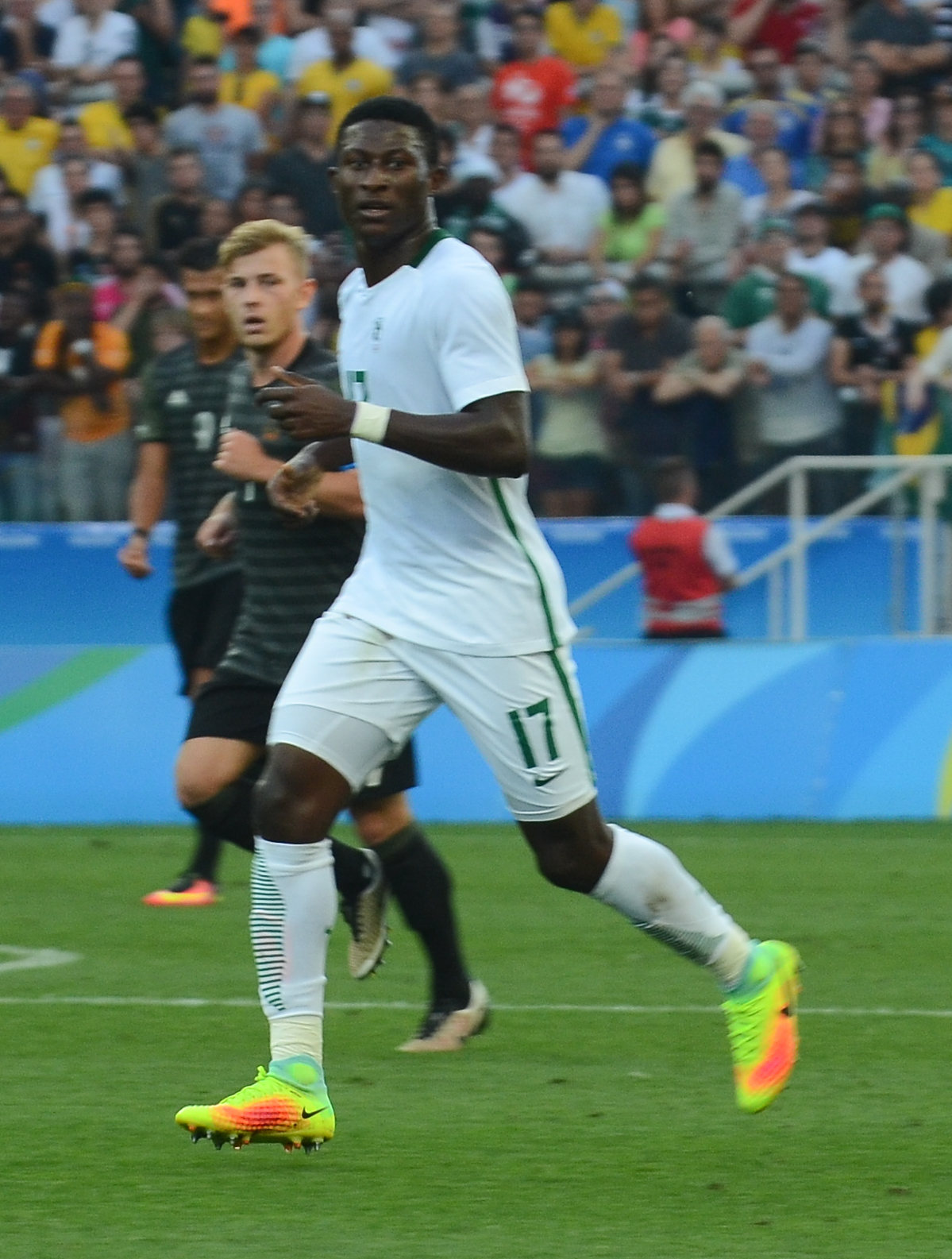
- Usman at the 2016 Olympics

Personal information
- Full name: Mohammed Usman
- Date of birth: 2 March 1994 (age 32)
- Height: 1.83 m (6 ft 0 in)
- Position: Central midfielder

Team information
- Current team: Ironi Tiberias
- Number: 10

Senior career*
| Years | Team | Apps | (Gls) |
| –2013 | Ranchers Bees | | |
| 2013–2016 | Taraba | | |
| 2016–2017 | União Madeira | 0 | (0) |
| 2018–2019 | Sarpsborg 08 | 11 | (1) |
| 2019 | Pyunik | 13 | (2) |
| 2019 | Tambov | 1 | (0) |
| 2020 | Shakhter Karagandy | 18 | (1) |
| 2021–2022 | Hapoel Hadera | 37 | (1) |
| 2022–2023 | Sektzia Ness Ziona | 27 | (1) |
| 2023–2025 | Maccabi Bnei Reineh | 63 | (3) |
| 2025–2026 | Ironi Tiberias | 21 | (1) |
| 2026– | Maccabi Bnei Reineh | 0 | (0) |

International career^{‡}
| 2016 | Nigeria U23 | 3 | (0) |
| 2025– | Nigeria | 0 | (0) |
Medal record
Men's football
Representing Nigeria
Africa Cup of Nations
| Third place | 2025 Morocco | Team |
Olympic Games
| Bronze medal – third place | 2016 Rio de Janeiro | Team |
- * Club domestic league appearances and goals as of 24 June 2026 ‡ National team caps and goals as of 14:57, 1 June 2019 (UTC)

Yusuf Mohammed Usman Edu (born 2 March 1994) is a Nigerian footballer who plays as a central midfielder for Ligat HaAl club Maccabi Bnei Reineh and the Nigeria national team.

== Career ==
Usman started his professional career in Nigeria with Kaduna-based club Ranchers Bees. After a year, he left and joined Taraba whom he later helped to the gain promotion to the Nigerian Premier League. Usman was later named the captain of the club at 18, which made him the youngest captain in the league.

On 1 June 2019, FC Pyunik announced that they had released Usman by mutual consent.

He was released by Russian club FC Tambov in December 2019.

== International career ==
On 11 December 2025, Usman was called up to the Nigeria squad for the 2025 Africa Cup of Nations.

== Honours ==
Nigeria U23

- Olympic Bronze Medal: 2016

Nigeria

- Africa Cup of Nations third place: 2025
