= Serhiy Shevchuk (footballer, born 1985) =

Ukrainian footballer

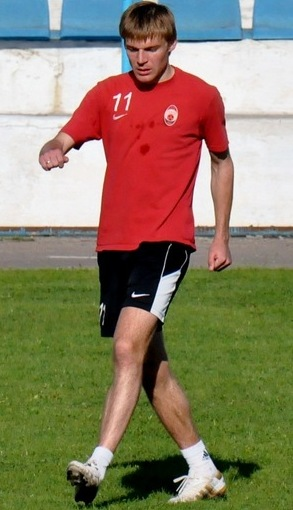

Personal information
- Full name: Serhiy Mykolayovych Shevchuk
- Date of birth: 18 June 1985 (age 41)
- Place of birth: Makariv, Kiev Oblast, Ukrainian SSR
- Height: 1.84 m (6 ft 1/2 in)
- Positions: Midfielder; left back

Team information
- Current team: Juniors Shpytky
- Number: 36

Youth career
- 1998: FC Arsenal Kyiv
- 1998–2002: RVUFK Kyiv

Senior career*
Years	Team	Apps	(Gls)
2003	Systema-Borex Borodyanka	2	(0)
2004–2012	Shakhtar Donetsk	1	(0)
2004–2006	→ Shakhtar-2 Donetsk	71	(12)
2006–2007	→ Shakhtar-3 Donetsk	5	(2)
2008–2011	→ Zorya Luhansk (loan)	84	(5)
2011–2012	→ Illichivets Mariupol (loan)	18	(0)
2012–2015	Illichivets Mariupol	45	(3)
2015–2016	Sokol Saratov	34	(4)
2016–2019	Tambov	90	(14)
2019	→ Pyunik (loan)	15	(1)
2019–2020	Pyunik	16	(1)
2020–	Juniors Shpytky (amateurs)	0	(0)

International career
2005	Ukraine-21	5	(0)
- * Club domestic league appearances and goals as of 2 July 2020

Serhiy Mykolayovych Shevchuk (Ukrainian: Сергій Миколайович Шевчук; born 18 June 1985) is a professional Ukrainian football midfielder who plays for Juniors Shpytky.

== Club career ==
On 9 January 2019, Shevchuk joined Armenian club FC Pyunik on loan from FC Tambov until the end of the 2018–19 season.

On 6 June 2019, after being released by Tambov, Shevchuk signed a permanent contract with Pyunik.
