= Maksym Trusevych =

Ukrainian footballer

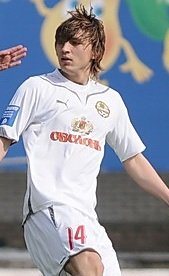

Personal information
- Full name: Maksym Pavlovych Trusevych
- Date of birth: 1 August 1985 (age 41)
- Place of birth: Kirovsk, Ukrainian SSR
- Height: 1.79 m (5 ft 10 1/2 in)
- Position: Midfielder

Youth career
- Borysfen Boryspil

Senior career*
Years	Team	Apps	(Gls)
2001–2003	Borysfen-2 Boryspil	40	(1)
2002–2005	Borysfen Boryspil	28	(0)
2004	→ Boreks-Borysfen Borodianka (loan)	11	(0)
2005	Shakhtar-2 Donetsk	14	(0)
2005–2009	Shakhtar Donetsk	2	(0)
2007	→ Metalurh Zaporizhya (loan)	9	(0)
2007	→ Rostov (loan)	5	(0)
2008	→ Zorya Luhansk (loan)	0	(0)
2009	→ Baltika Kaliningrad (loan)	27	(1)
2010	Obolon Kyiv	3	(0)
2010	Chornomorets Odesa	18	(0)
2011–2015	SKA-Energiya Khabarovsk	111	(4)
2015–2016	Sokol Saratov	37	(1)
2016–2018	Tambov	67	(6)
2018–2019	Pyunik	22	(1)

International career
2004–2005	Ukraine U21	3	(1)
Medal record
Men's football
Representing Ukraine
UEFA European Under-19 Championship
Bronze medal – third place	2004 Switzerland
- * Club domestic league appearances and goals

Maksym Pavlovych Trusevych (Ukrainian: Максим Павлович Трусевич; born 1 August 1985) is a Ukrainian former professional footballer, who played as a midfielder.

== Club career ==
Trusevych has previously played in the Russian Premier League with FC Rostov and in the Russian First Division with FC Baltika Kaliningrad. He moved to Chornomorets from FC Obolon Kyiv in June 2010.

On 24 June 2018, FC Pyunik announced the signing of Trusevych, leaving at the end of his contract on 16 June 2019.
