= Maksim Zhestokov =

Russian footballer

Personal information
- Full name: Maksim Andreyevich Zhestokov
- Date of birth: 19 June 1991 (age 35)
- Place of birth: Kazan, Soviet Union
- Height: 1.87 m (6 ft 2 in)
- Position: Defender

Senior career*
Years	Team	Apps	(Gls)
2007–2016	Rubin Kazan	1	(0)
2012	→ KAMAZ Naberezhnye Chelny (loan)	8	(2)
2012	→ Khimki (loan)	3	(0)
2013	→ Volgar Astrakhan (loan)	0	(0)
2013	→ Neftekhimik Nizhnekamsk (loan)	1	(0)
2014–2015	→ Volga Nizhny Novgorod (loan)	29	(2)
2016	Volgar Astrakhan	12	(1)
2017–2018	Shinnik Yaroslavl	25	(0)
2018–2020	Pyunik	42	(5)
2020–2021	Akron Tolyatti	22	(1)
2021–2022	Amkar Perm	22	(3)
2023	Rubin-2 Kazan	0	(0)

International career
2009	Russia U-19	4	(0)
2011	Russia U-20	2	(0)
2011–2013	Russia U-21	12	(2)
- * Club domestic league appearances and goals

Maksim Andreyevich Zhestokov (Russian: Максим Андреевич Жестоков; born 19 June 1991) is a Russian former football defender.

== Career ==
Zhestokov made his professional debut for FC Rubin Kazan on 15 July 2009 in the Russian Cup game against FC Volga Tver.

On 13 July 2012, Zhestokov signed a one-year contract with Russian second division side FC Khimki.

On 24 June 2018, FC Pyunik announced the signing of Zhestokov.
