= Sergei Kolychev =

Russian footballer

Personal information
- Full name: Sergei Valeryevich Kolychev
- Date of birth: 28 September 1988 (age 38)
- Place of birth: Moscow, Russian SFSR
- Height: 1.79 m (5 ft 10 1/2 in)
- Position: Defender

Senior career*
Years	Team	Apps	(Gls)
2009	Nika Moscow	2	(0)
2010–2012	Dnepr Smolensk	62	(2)
2012–2013	Luch-Energiya Vladivostok	42	(1)
2014	Sakhalin Yuzhno-Sakhalinsk	3	(0)
2014–2015	Zenit Penza	25	(0)
2015	Luch-Energiya Vladivostok	20	(0)
2016–2017	Domodedovo Moscow	14	(1)
2017–2018	Rotor Volgograd	17	(1)
2018–2019	Pyunik	13	(0)
2020–2021	Peresvet Domodedovo		
2021–2022	Balashikha		
- * Club domestic league appearances and goals

Sergei Valeryevich Kolychev (Russian: Серге́й Валерьевич Колычев; born 28 September 1988) is a Russian former footballer who played as a defender.

== Career ==
=== Club ===
He played 3 seasons in the Russian Football National League for FC Luch-Energiya Vladivostok and FC Rotor Volgograd.

On 1 June 2019, Kolychev was released by FC Pyunik.
