= FC Izhevsk (2011) =

- Full name: Football Club Izhevsk
- Founded: 2011
- Ground: Central Republican Stadium (Izhevsk)
- Capacity: 16,000
- Manager: Yegor Kozyrev
- League: Russian Second League, Division B, Group 4
- 2026: 8th
- Website: vk.com/fcizhevsk_official
Home colours	Away colours

FC Izhevsk (Russian: ФК «Ижевск») is a Russian football club from Izhevsk, founded in 2011.

== Club history ==
It played its first professional season in the Russian Second Division in 2011 as FC Zenit Izhevsk, where it replaced FC SOYUZ-Gazprom Izhevsk. In July 2023, it dropped out of the Russian Second League as the government of Udmurtia refused to finance the club for the season at that level.

In 2025, the club was renamed to FC Izhevsk.

For the 2026 season, the club was licensed for the fourth-tier Russian Second League Division B.

== Current squad ==
As of 14 September 2026, according to the Second League website.

Note: Flags indicate national team as defined under FIFA eligibility rules; some limited exceptions apply. Players may hold more than one non-FIFA nationality.

No.	Pos.	Nation	Player
3	DF	RUS	Vyacheslav Fomin
5	DF	RUS	Gleb Bizin
6	MF	RUS	Yegor Mogilev
7	DF	RUS	Marat Mamedov
8	MF	RUS	Yegor Ivanov
10	MF	RUS	Aleksandr Rybolovlev
11	MF	RUS	Daniil Zaretsky
13	GK	RUS	Ilya Kislukhin
15	DF	RUS	Yaroslav Ryazapov
16	GK	RUS	Yegor Sidorov
17	DF	RUS	Artyom Kustov
18	MF	RUS	Gleb Mishlanov
19	FW	RUS	Yegor Totsky

No.	Pos.	Nation	Player
21	DF	RUS	Anton Bocharov
22	DF	RUS	Denis Magadiyev
23	MF	RUS	Nikita Trapitsyn
27	MF	RUS	Mikhail Yusupov
44	DF	RUS	Bulat Sadykov
47	MF	RUS	Aleksey Solovyov
50	DF	RUS	Emil Kamilov
55	MF	RUS	Nikita Lysenko
63	DF	RUS	Aleksandr Bosov
73	DF	RUS	Artur Alekseyev
75	GK	RUS	Yevgeny Archibasov
88	MF	RUS	Stepan Surikov
