= 2021 Artsakh Football League =

Artsakh Football League
- Season: 2021
- All statistics correct as of 8 May 2021.

The 2021 Artsakh Football League was the 3rd official professional season of the Artsakh Football League. It started on March 7th, 2021 and was composed of nine clubs which competed for the title.

== Participants ==
Nine teams will take part in this year's competition. Initially it was decided that 10 teams would participate, which included Russian peacekeeper's team. However, the Russian team later withdrew.

Location of teams of the 2021 Artsakh Football League

=== Clubs ===
Club	Location	Stadium
Artsakh U-17 FC	Stepanakert	Republican Stadium
Avo FC	Martuni	Avakian Arena Stadium
Berd Askeran FC	Askeran	Askeran City Stadium
Berd Chartar FC	Chartar	Chartar City Stadium
Gandzasar FC	Vank	
Jraberd FC	Martakert	Vigen Shirinyan Stadium
Kirs FC	Shushi	
Tigran Mets FC	Noragyugh	
Yerazank FC	Stepanakert	Republican Stadium

== League table ==
Pos	Team	Pld	W	D	L	GF	GA	GD	Pts
1	Yerazank	0	0	0	0	0	0	0	0
2	Berd Askeran	0	0	0	0	0	0	0	0
3	Tigran Mets	0	0	0	0	0	0	0	0
4	Jraberd	0	0	0	0	0	0	0	0
5	Avo FC	0	0	0	0	0	0	0	0
6	Gandzasar	0	0	0	0	0	0	0	0
7	Kirs	0	0	0	0	0	0	0	0
8	Berd Chartar	0	0	0	0	0	0	0	0
9	Artsakh U-17 FC	0	0	0	0	0	0	0	0

Updated to match(es) played on 8 May 2021. Source: Artsakh Football League facebook page.
Rules for classification: 1) Points; 2) Play-off (only if deciding champion); 3) Matches won; 4) Head-to-head points; 5) Head-to-head matches won; 6) Head-to-head goal difference; 7) Head-to-head goals scored; 8) Head-to-head away goals scored; 9) Goal difference; 10) Goals scored. res_col_header=QR

== Results ==
The league will be played in three stages, for a total of 24 matches played per team.

Home \ Away	A17	AVO	ASK	CHR	GAN	JRA	KIR	TIG	YER
Artsakh U-17	—								
Avo		—							
Berd Askeran			—						
Berd Chartar				—					
Gandzasar					—				
Jraberd						—			
Kirs							—		
Tigran Mets								—	
Yerazank									—

Updated to match(es) played on 8 May 2021. Source: Artsakh Football League facebook page.
Legend: Blue = home team win; Yellow = draw; Red = away team win.
