= Artsakh Football League =

- Founded: 2018; 8 years ago
- Folded: 2023; 3 years ago
- Country: Artsakh
- Number of clubs: 9
- Level on pyramid: 1
- Relegation to: none
- Domestic cup: Artsakh Cup

Artsakh football league was the top football competition in self-proclaimed Republic of Artsakh. Although there was a football competition held in Artsakh starting 2004, the latest league was formed in 2018, being composed of eight clubs. This was expanded in ahead of the 2019 season with 4 additional teams announced, bringing the league to 12 clubs.

== Description ==
The competition involved clubs from several regions of the Republic of Artsakh and games were held in two rounds.

== Final season participants ==
Location of teams of the 2021 Artsakh Football League

Club	Location	Stadium
Artsakh U-17 FC	Stepanakert	Republican Stadium
Avo FC	Martuni	Martuni City Stadium
Berd Askeran FC	Askeran	Askeran City Stadium
Berd Chartar FC	Chartar	Chartar City Stadium
Gandzasar FC	Vank	
Jraberd FC	Martakert	Vigen Shirinyan Stadium
Kirs FC	Shushi	
Tigran Mets FC	Noragyugh	
Yerazank FC	Stepanakert	Republican Stadium

== Seasons ==
Year	Champion	Runner-up	Third place
2018	Lernayin Artsakh	Berd Askeran	Yerazank
2019	Berd Askeran	Yerazank	Avo
2020	Competition not held due to COVID-19 outbreak.		
2021 (abandoned)	Yerazank	Avo	Berd Chartar FC
