= 2018 Artsakh Football League =

Artsakh Football League
- Season: 2018
- Dates: 14 July 2018 – 18 November 2018
- Matches played: 56
- Goals scored: 270 (4.82 per match)
- Biggest home win: Lernayin Artsakh 10–0 Jraberd (15 July 2018)
- Biggest away win: Berd Askeran 0–10 Lernayin Artsakh (20 October 2018)
- Highest scoring: Lernayin Artsakh 10–0 Jraberd (15 July 2018)
- Longest winning run: Lernayin Artsakh (11 matches)
- Longest unbeaten run: Lernayin Artsakh (14 matches)
- Longest winless run: Jraberd (11 matches)
- Longest losing run: Jraberd (11 matches)

The 2018 Artsakh Football League was the 1st official professional season of the Artsakh Football League. It started on the 14 July and ended on 18th of November. It was composed of eight clubs which competed for the title.

== Participants ==
Eight Teams took part in the 2018 competition. All eight clubs had participated in the past in other competitions and tournaments, but this was the first year for them in the Artsakh Football League.

Location of teams of the 2018 Artsakh Football League

=== Clubs ===
Club	Location	Stadium
Avo FC	Martuni	Martuni City Stadium
Berd Askeran FC	Askeran	Askeran City Stadium
Berd Chartar FC	Chartar	Chartar City Stadium
Gandzasar FC	Vank	
Jraberd FC	Martakert	Vigen Shirinyan Stadium
Kirs FC	Shushi	
Lernayin Artsakh FC	Stepanakert	Republican Stadium
Yerazank FC	Stepanakert	Republican Stadium

== League table ==
Pos	Team	Pld	W	D	L	GF	GA	GD	Pts
1	Lernayin Artsakh	14	13	1	0	76	3	+73	40
2	Berd Askeran	14	9	1	4	50	28	+22	28
3	Yerazank	14	8	3	3	35	22	+13	27
4	Berd Chartar	14	7	3	4	27	25	+2	24
5	Avo	14	6	2	6	29	23	+6	20
6	Kirs	14	4	1	9	19	42	−23	13
7	Jraberd	14	2	0	12	17	68	−51	6
8	Gandzasar	14	1	1	12	17	59	−42	4

== Results ==
The league was played in two stage, one home and one away, for a total of 14 matches per team.

Home \ Away	AVO	ASK	CHR	GAN	JRA	KIR	LER	YER
Avo	—	0–3	5–1	6–0	2–0	1–3	0–1	4–4
Berd Askeran	0–1	—	3–4	8–0	9–1	4–0	0–10	2–2
Berd Chartar	0–0	1–5	—	2–1	5–1	3–2	0–0	0–0
Gandzasar	3–5	2–3	1–3	—	1–3	1–2	1–7	1–6
Jraberd	3–2	1–8	0–3	2–3	—	1–4	2–7	2–4
Kirs	0–2	0–2	2–4	2–2	3–0	—	0–9	0–2
Lernayin Artsakh	3–0	5–0	2–0	8–0	10–0	9–0	—	3–0
Yerazank	2–1	1–3	3–1	2–1	7–1	2–1	0–2	—

Source: Artsakh Football League facebook page.
Legend: Blue = home team win; Yellow = draw; Red = away team win.
