= 2019 Artsakh Football League =

Artsakh Football League
- Season: 2019
- Matches: 56
- Goals: 306 (5.46 per match)
- Biggest home win: Lernayin Artsakh 15–0 Jraberd (4 May 2019)
- Biggest away win: Artsakh U-21 0–7 Lernayin Artsakh (27 March 2019); Kirs 0–7 Lernayin Artsakh (13 April 2019)
- Highest scoring: Askeran 15–1 Berdzor (20 April 2019)
- Longest winning run: Lernayin Artsakh (8 matches)
- Longest unbeaten run: Lernayin Artsakh (8 matches)
- Longest winless run: Berdzor (9 matches)
- Longest losing run: Berdzor (9 matches)
- All statistics correct as of 12 May 2019.

The 2019 Artsakh Football League was the 2nd official professional season of the Artsakh Football League. It started on March 9, 2019, and was composed of twelve clubs which competed for the title.

== Participants ==
Twelve teams will take part in this year's competition. No team was relegated in the previous season, but 4 more were added this year.

Location of teams of the 2019 Artsakh Football League

=== Clubs ===
Club	Location	Stadium
Artsakh U-21 FC	Stepanakert	Republican Stadium
Avo FC	Martuni	Martuni City Stadium
Berdzor FC	Berdzor	
Berd Askeran FC	Askeran	Askeran City Stadium
Berd Chartar FC	Chartar	Chartar City Stadium
Dizak FC	Hadrut	
Gandzasar FC	Vank	
Jraberd FC	Martakert	Vigen Shirinyan Stadium
Kirs FC	Shushi	
Lernayin Artsakh FC	Stepanakert	Republican Stadium
Mijnaberd FC	Karvachar	
Yerazank FC	Stepanakert	Republican Stadium

== League table ==
Pos	Team	Pld	W	D	L	GF	GA	GD	Pts
1	Berd Askeran	30	27	1	2	167	40	+127	82
2	Yerazank	30	26	1	3	167	40	+127	79
3	Avo	30	21	3	6	150	34	+116	66
4	Artsakh U-21	30	19	4	7	92	49	+43	61
5	Berd Chartar	30	16	8	6	79	36	+43	56
6	Kirs	30	14	3	13	65	72	−7	45
7	Dizak	30	7	6	17	51	80	−29	27
8	Mijnaberd	30	7	3	20	61	92	−31	24
9	Jraberd	30	6	3	21	61	101	−40	21
10	Gandzasar	30	4	1	25	43	138	−95	13
11	Berdzor	30	1	1	28	20	214	−194	4
12	Lernayin Artsakh	0	0	0	0	0	0	0	0

Updated to match(es) played on 31 December 2019. Source: Artsakh Football League facebook page.
Rules for classification: 1) Points; 2) Play-off (only if deciding champion); 3) Matches won; 4) Head-to-head points; 5) Head-to-head matches won; 6) Head-to-head goal difference; 7) Head-to-head goals scored; 8) Head-to-head away goals scored; 9) Goal difference; 10) Goals scored. Lernayin Artsakh FC withdrew after 8 matches. Their results have been annulled.

== Results ==
The league will be played in two stages, one home and one away, for a total of 22 matches played per team.

Home \ Away	A21	AVO	ASK	CHR	BER	DIZ	GAN	JRA	KIR	LER	MIJ	YER
Artsakh U-21	—					4–2		1–0		0–7		0–3
Avo	0–2	—	3–6		13–1	4–1	7–1		1–0			
Berd Askeran	7–2		—	5–2	15–1	7–0		3–2	2–1			
Berd Chartar	2–4			—	12–0	1–1	3–2		1–1	0–3		
Berdzor	0–5				—	0–4					1–6	
Dizak						—					0–0	3–5
Gandzasar	2–4				4–1	1–3	—					2–4
Jraberd		0–5		1–2	9–2		1–2	—				
Kirs					12–1	2–0	1–0	2–1	—	0–7	3–1	
Lernayin Artsakh		3–0	4–2			4–0		15–0		—		5–0
Mijnaberd	2–7		1–7	0–1			3–0	7–0			—	
Yerazank		0–4	1–0	1–1					2–1		4–1	—

Updated to match(es) played on 12 May 2019. Source: Artsakh Football League facebook page.
Legend: Blue = home team win; Yellow = draw; Red = away team win.
