= Yerazank FC =

- Full name: Yerazank Football Club
- Founded: 1982; 44 years ago
- Ground: Stepanakert Republican, Stepanakert
- Capacity: 12,000
- Owner: (Republic of Artsakh)
- President: (Republic of Artsakh)
- Manager: (Republic of Artsakh)
- League: Artsakh Football League
- 2021: 1st
Home colours	Away colours

Yerazank Football Club (Armenian: Երազանք Ֆուտբոլային Ակումբ – Yerazank Futbolayin Akumb) was an Armenian football club established in Stepanakert, and participated in the Artsakh Football League.

== History ==
It was founded during the Soviet Union in 1982. During the 1992 season, it took no part in any competition due to the Nagorno Karabakh war. In 1993, due to the ongoing war, the club was moved from Stepanakert to Yerevan.

In 1995 the club disbanded and gave its license for the 1995–96 season in the Armenian Premier League to the other football club from Stepanakert, FC Karabakh Stepanakert. Although it had a brief spell in the Armenian First League in 2003, the club did not participate in any professional football league until 2018, when it entered the Artsakh Football League.

== League record ==
Year	Division	Position	GP	W	D	L	GS	GA	Pts
1990	Soviet Lower Second League	16	18	8	5	5	37	23	21
1991	Soviet Lower Second League	8	38	17	4	17	67	67	38
1992	No Participation								
1993	Armenian Premier League	8	28	11	3	14	44	55	25
1994	Armenian Premier League	9	28	9	5	14	29	50	23
1995	Armenian Premier League	6	10	0	5	5	4	13	5
1996–2002	No Participation								
2003	Armenian First League	12	22	0	0	22	13	103	0
2004–2017	No Participation								
2018	Artsakh Football League	3	14	8	3	3	35	22	27
2019	Artsakh Football League	2	30	26	1	3	167	40	79
2020	Competition not held due to COVID-19 outbreak.								
2021	Artsakh Football League	1	3	2	1	0	35	3	+32
