= 1994 Armenian Cup =

Tournament details
- Country: Armenia
- Teams: 16

Final positions
- Champions: Ararat Yerevan
- Runners-up: Shirak

Tournament statistics
- Matches played: 20
- Goals scored: 62 (3.1 per match)

The 1994 Armenian Cup was the third edition of the Armenian Cup, a football competition. In 1994, the tournament had 16 participants, none of which were reserve teams.

== Results ==
=== Preliminary round ===
The match was scheduled to be played on 27 March 1994.

Team 1	Score	Team 2
Nairit	w/o	Lori

=== First round ===
Ararat Yerevan received a bye to the quarter-finals.

The matches were played on 2 and 3 April 1994.

Team 1	Score	Team 2
Tsement Ararat	0–2	Shirak
Arpa	2–1	Zangezour
BKMA Yerevan	0–4	Kotayk
BMA-Arai Echmiadzin	0–2	AOSS Yerevan
Kanaz Yerevan	0–5	Banants Kotayk
Nairit	0–0 (3–4 p)	ASS-SKIF Yerevan
Yerazank	2–0	Van Yerevan

=== Quarter-finals ===
The first legs were played in April 1994. The second legs were played in April 1994.

Team 1	Agg.	Team 2	1st leg	2nd leg
Shirak	12–0	Arpa	7–0	5–0
Kotayk	0–8	AOSS Yerevan	0–5	0–3
ASS-SKIF Yerevan	2–6	Banants Kotayk	0–3	2–3
Yerazank	1–6	Ararat Yerevan	0–3	1–3

=== Semi-finals ===
The first legs were played in April 1994. The second legs were played on 1 May 1994.

Team 1	Agg.	Team 2	1st leg	2nd leg
Banants Kotayk	2–4	Ararat Yerevan	0–2	2–2
Shirak	2–2 (a)	AOSS Yerevan	1–0	1–2

=== Final ===
26 May 1994

Ararat	1–0	Shirak
Barseghyan 82'

Hrazdan Stadium, Yerevan
Attendance: 10,000
Referee: Khazaryan (Yerevan)

== See also ==
- 1994 Armenian Premier League
