= 1994 Armenian Premier League =

Football league season

Statistics of Armenian Premier League in the 1994 season.

- Zangezour, Lori Vanadzor and Aznavour FC were promoted.
- Zvartnots Echmiadzin changed their name to BMA-Arai Echmiadzin.

== League table ==
Pos	Team	Pld	W	D	L	GF	GA	GD	Pts	Qualification or relegation
1	Shirak (C)	28	24	4	0	83	19	+64	52	Qualification for the UEFA Cup preliminary round
2	Homenetmen Yerevan	28	23	1	4	113	24	+89	47	
3	Ararat Yerevan	28	21	5	2	109	21	+88	47	Qualification for the Cup Winners' Cup qualifying round
4	Homenmen-FIMA Yerevan	28	15	6	7	65	45	+20	36	
5	Banants Kotayk	28	17	1	10	95	56	+39	35	
6	Tsement Ararat	28	11	6	11	54	49	+5	28	
7	Kotayk	28	12	3	13	73	53	+20	27	
8	Aznavour	28	11	3	14	43	72	−29	25	
9	Yerazank	28	9	5	14	29	50	−21	23	
10	Van Yerevan	28	9	4	15	34	72	−38	22	
11	Zangezour	28	9	4	15	25	77	−52	22	
12	Nairit (R)	28	7	6	15	22	43	−21	20	Relegation to First League
13	Lori Vanadzor (R)	28	5	6	17	22	65	−43	16	Relegation to First League
14	BMA-Arai Echmiadzin (R)	28	5	5	18	38	85	−47	15	Relegation to First League
15	KanAZ Yerevan (R)	28	1	3	24	15	89	−74	5	Relegation to First League
16	Impuls (W)	0	0	0	0	0	0	0	0	Withdrew (Note: Impuls withdrew before start of the season.)

Source: RSSSF
(C) Champions; (R) Relegated; (W) Withdrew

== Results ==
Home \ Away	ARA	AZN	BAN	BMA	HOM	HMT	KAN	KOT	LOR	NAI	SHI	TSE	VAN	YER	ZAN
Ararat Yerevan		7–1	7–3	8–0	2–1	2–1	2–1	2–4	7–0	5–0	0–0	3–0 (Note: Match awarded.)	6–0	5–1	14–0
Aznavour	1–2		0–4	3–1	3–1	2–4	3–0	3–2	1–1	1–0	1–4	5–4	2–1	4–2	1–0
Banants Kotayk	3–3	9–0		3–1	2–5	1–5	7–0	3–0	6–2	7–0	0–1	4–2	2–1	5–0	11–1
BMA-Arai Echmiadzin	0–6	0–2	1–2		2–4	0–4	5–1	1–8	2–2	2–3	1–1	0–0	0–2	2–1	6–1
Homenmen-FIMA Yerevan	0–5	2–1	7–3	14–1		1–2	6–0	2–0	2–1	1–0	1–3	2–2	5–1	3–0	1–1
Homenetmen Yerevan	0–1	6–1	8–1	6–0	6–1		3–0	5–1	10–0	5–0	2–2	4–0	7–2	5–0	3–0
KanAZ Yerevan	0–3	1–3	0–4	1–4	1–1	2–5		3–9	0–1	0–3	1–2	0–3	1–1	0–2	1–2
Kotayk	1–5	1–1	4–0	3–3	1–1	0–3	6–0		3–0	1–0	1–3	3–2	3–0	4–1	10–0
Lori Vanadzor	0–0	0–0	0–1	1–2	0–3	1–6	1–0	4–1		0–0	0–3	3–0	0–1	1–5	0–1
Nairit	0–1	3–0	1–5	3–1	1–1	1–0	0–1	1–0	0–1		1–2	0–0	2–4	0–1	0–0
Shirak	1–1	4–0	2–1	7–0	5–1	2–1	4–0	3–1	4–1	1–0		3–2	2–0	3–2	7–1
Tsement Ararat	1–0	7–2	2–1	5–1	1–1	1–3	2–0	2–1	3–0	2–1	0–3		2–1	0–1	2–3
Van Yerevan	2–10	3–1	0–6	2–1	1–2	2–5	1–1	2–1	1–0	1–1	0–4	1–6		1–0	2–0
Yerazank	0–0	1–0	0–1	1–1	0–3	0–1	2–0	1–3	2–1	0–0	0–4	2–2	1–1		1–0
Zangezour	0–2	2–1	3–0	1–0	0–3	0–3	4–0	2–1	1–1	0–1	0–3	1–1	1–0	0–2	

Source: RSSSF
Legend: Blue = home team win; Yellow = draw; Red = away team win.

== Top goalscorers ==
#	Player		Team	Goals
1	(Armenia)	Arsen Avetisyan	Homenetmen Yerevan	39
2	(Armenia)	Henrik Berberyan	Kotayk	25
3	(Armenia)	Anushavan Pahlevanyan	Tsement Ararat	23
4	(Armenia)	Gegham Hovhannisyan	Homenetmen Yerevan	22
5	(Armenia)	Vahe Yaghmuryan	Ararat Yerevan	18

Source: RSSSF

== See also ==
- 1994 in Armenian football
- 1994 Armenian First League
- 1994 Armenian Cup
