= 2021–22 Armenian First League =

Armenian First League
- Season: 2021–22
- Dates: 5 August 2021 – 19 May 2022
- Champions: Lernayin Artsakh
- Matches: 112
- Goals: 374 (3.34 per match)
- Top goalscorer: Sargis Metoyan (14 goals)
- All statistics correct as of 11:13, 20 June 2022 (UTC).

The 2021–22 Armenian First League season was the 30th since its establishment. The season began 5 August 2021 and finished 19 May 2022.

== Stadiums and locations ==
Locations of the 2020–21 Armenian First League teams

Club	Location	Stadium	Capacity
Alashkert-2	Yerevan (Shengavit)	Alashkert Stadium	6,850
Ararat-Armenia-2	Yerevan	Yerevan Football Academy	n/a
BKMA-2	Yerevan	Vagharshapat Football Academy	300
Gandzasar	Kapan	Gandzasar Stadium	3,500
Lernayin Artsakh	Sisian	Sisian City Stadium	500
Pyunik Academy	Yerevan	Pyunik Stadium	780
Shirak	Gyumri	Gyumri City Stadium	2,844
Urartu-2	Yerevan	Urartu Training Centre	500

== League table ==
Pos	Team	Pld	W	D	L	GF	GA	GD	Pts	Promotion
1	Lernayin Artsakh	28	23	4	1	65	12	+53	73	Promotion to the Armenian Premier League
2	Shirak	28	22	3	3	83	19	+64	69	Promotion to the Armenian Premier League
3	Gandzasar	28	10	7	11	38	47	−9	37	
4	Pyunik Academy	28	10	4	14	57	54	+3	34	
5	Ararat-Armenia-2	28	8	7	13	33	42	−9	31	
6	Urartu-2	28	7	8	13	39	51	−12	29	
7	BKMA-2	28	8	5	15	35	58	−23	29	
8	Alashkert-2	28	2	6	20	24	91	−67	12	

Updated to match(es) played on 19 May 2022. Source:
Rules for classification: 1) Points; 2) Play-off (only if deciding champion); 3) Matches won; 4) Head-to-head points; 5) Head-to-head matches won; 6) Head-to-head goal difference; 7) Head-to-head goals scored; 8) Head-to-head away goals scored; 9) Goal difference; 10) Goals scored.

== Statistics ==
=== Top scorers ===
As of 19 May 2021.

Rank	Player	Club	Goals
1	(Armenia) Sargis Metoyan	Lernayin Artsakh	14
2	(Armenia) Artem Gevorgyan	Shirak	12
3	(Armenia) Arman Aslanyan	Shirak	11
4	(Venezuela) José Balza	Pyunik Academy	10
5	(Armenia) Tigran Ayunts	Urartu-2	9
6	(Armenia) Karapet Manukyan	Alashkert-2	8
7	(Armenia) Levon Vardanyan	Pyunik Academy	6
7	(Armenia) Orbeli Hambardzumyan	Gandzasar	6
9	(Armenia) Ruben Tigran Yesayan	Urartu-2	5
9	(Armenia) Davit Ghandilyan	Shirak	5
