= 1993 Armenian Premier League =

(Armenia) Armenian Premier League
- Season: 1993
- Champions: Ararat Yerevan
- Relegated: Kasagh; Malatia-Kilikia Yerevan
- Matches: 210
- Goals: 866 (4.12 per match)
- Top goalscorer: (Armenia) Andranik Hovsepyan (26) (Armenia) Gegham Hovhannisyan (26)
- Biggest home win: 13-1
- Biggest away win: 0-8
- Highest scoring: 13-1

Statistics of Armenian Premier League in the 1993 season.

- FC Ararat from the town of Ararat were promoted and changed their name to Tsement.
- Kilikia FC merged with FC Malatia to form Malatia-Kilikia Yerevan.
- Nairi SC were renamed Nairit FC.
- Shengavit FC of Yerevan withdrew from the league and the premier league license was granted to Yerazank FC who were relocated from Stepanakert to Yerevan.։

== Teams ==
Locations of the 1993 Armenian Premier League teams

== League table ==
Pos	Team	Pld	W	D	L	GF	GA	GD	Pts	Qualification or relegation
1	Ararat Yerevan (C)	28	23	5	0	92	9	+83	51	Qualification for the UEFA Cup preliminary round
2	Shirak	28	24	1	3	101	20	+81	49	
3	Banants Kotayk	28	23	2	3	111	21	+90	48	
4	Homenetmen Yerevan	28	21	3	4	80	29	+51	45	
5	Van Yerevan	28	15	2	11	71	49	+22	32	
6	Tsement Ararat	28	12	6	10	56	50	+6	30	
7	Homenmen-FIMA Yerevan	28	12	2	14	54	46	+8	26	
8	Yerazank	28	11	3	14	44	55	−11	25	
9	Nairit	28	8	4	16	29	61	−32	20	
10	KanAZ Yerevan	28	8	4	16	37	75	−38	20	
11	Kotayk	28	9	1	18	57	76	−19	19	
12	Impuls	28	8	2	18	42	89	−47	18	
13	Zvartnots Echmiadzin	28	6	4	18	42	78	−36	16	
14	Kasagh (R)	28	5	2	21	25	116	−91	12	Relegation to First League
15	Malatia-Kilikia Yerevan (R)	28	2	5	21	25	92	−67	9	Relegation to First League
16	Syunik Kapan (W)	0	–	–	–	–	–	—	0	Withdrew (Note: Syunik Kapan withdrew before start of the season.)

(C) Champions; (R) Relegated; (W) Withdrew

== Results ==
Home \ Away	ARA	BAN	HMT	HMM	IMP	KAN	KAS	KOT	MAL	NAI	SHI	TSE	VAN	YER	ZVA
Ararat Yerevan		4–2	1–1	7–1	5–0	1–1	8–0	1–0	6–1	6–1	1–0	6–0	3–0	7–0	1–0
Banants Kotayk	0–0		7–2	2–0	3–0 (Note: Match awarded.)	7–1	13–1	8–2	6–0	1–0	4–0	3–0	6–2	5–1	5–0
Homenetmen Yerevan	0–1	0–0		1–0	3–0	5–1	10–0	1–0	5–0	3–1	0–3	3–0	3–1	3–1	2–0
Homenmen-FIMA Yerevan	0–2	1–2	1–2		7–1	1–3	5–1	4–1	2–1	2–0	1–2	0–3	4–2	0–0	5–1
Impuls	0–3	0–8	1–2	2–6		1–2	2–1	1–2	2–1	1–3	1–5	1–1	2–2	2–1	3–0
KanAZ Yerevan	1–3	1–0	2–5	0–0	2–3		2–0	1–5	0–1	0–3	1–0	4–4	1–6	0–1	2–1
Kasagh	0–5	0–8	0–8	1–0	3–2	1–3		4–1	1–1	1–0	1–4	1–1	0–7	1–6	1–3
Kotayk	0–4	0–4	1–1	0–2	2–3	0–2	6–0		9–2	4–2	1–4	3–7	1–2	3–6	6–1
Malatia-Kilikia Yerevan	0–7	1–4	0–3	1–3	1–4	2–2	2–3	1–3		1–2	0–2	0–0	1–3	1–5	3–3
Nairit	0–3	0–3	0–4	0–4	1–2	1–0	1–0	3–1	1–0		0–4	1–3	0–3	1–1	3–2
Shirak	1–1	3–2	6–1	3–1	7–0	5–0	3–0	4–0	6–0	3–1		7–1	5–1	4–1	8–0
Tsement Ararat	0–1	0–3	0–1	1–2	4–2	2–1	5–1	3–0	6–0	0–0	0–2		5–0	1–0	2–1
Van Yerevan	0–0	0–1	1–2	4–1	5–2	10–0	4–3	1–2	0–3	5–0	0–1	3–0		1–0	2–1
Yerazank	0–1	1–2	1–6	2–1	3–0	5–4	2–0	0–3	3–0	0–0	0–3	0–3	1–3		1–0
Zvartnots Echmiadzin	0–4	1–2	0–3	1–0	6–4	2–0	4–0	4–1	1–1	4–4	1–6	4–4	1–3	0–2	

Legend: Blue = home team win; Yellow = draw; Red = away team win.

== Top goalscorers ==
#	Player		Team	Goals
1	(Armenia)	Andranik Hovsepyan	Banants Kotayk	26
1	(Armenia)	Gegham Hovhannisyan	Homenetmen Yerevan	26
3	(Armenia)	Hovhannes Toumbaryan	Tsement Ararat	24
4	(Armenia)	Ara Evdokimov	Van Yerevan	21
5	(Armenia)	Vahe Yaghmuryan	Ararat Yerevan	20
5	(Armenia)	Ashot Barseghyan	Banants Kotayk	20

== See also ==
- 1993 in Armenian football
- 1993 Armenian First League
- 1993 Armenian Cup
