= Lernayin Artsakh FC =

- Full name: Lernayin Artsakh Football Club
- Founded: 1927; 99 years ago
- Ground: Sisian Stadium, Sisian, Armenia
- President: Mher Avanesyan
- Manager: Artashes Adamyan
- League: Armenian First League
- 2023-24: Armenian First League, 4 of 15
Home colours	Away colours

Lernayin Artsakh FC (Armenian: Լեռնային Արցախ Ֆուտբոլային Ակումբ) is an association football club formerly based in Stepanakert, breakaway Republic of Artsakh but is registered in the town of Vayk, Vayots Dzor Province, Armenia. Currently, the team plays their home games in Sisian, Armenia. The club was founded in 1927 in Soviet Azerbaijan and its current name translates from Armenian as "Mountainous Artsakh".

== History ==
The club was founded in 1927 under the name Dinamo Stepanakert. In 1960, the name was changed to Karabakh and remained by that name until 1989 when it was renamed Artsakh. During the years between 1992 and 1995 they were unable to participate in any competition due to the First Nagorno-Karabakh War. In 1995, the club moved from Stepanakert to Yerevan in order to participate in the Armenian Premier League. They subsequently changed their name back to Karabakh.

In 1999, the club was expelled from the Premier League due to financial problems, but managed return to professional football the following year. The club changed its name to Lernayin Artsakh in 2002 and played their home matches in Kapan that year.

The club withdrew from the Armenian top tier before the start of the 2003 season in protest against the exclusion of fellow Premier League club Ararat Yerevan. The next year, the club finished second in the First League and again won promotion. Their return to the highest level in 2002 was of short duration, as they withdrew after playing eleven matches. In 2006 they won promotion to the Premier League for a third time, but this time declined to enter the top flight.

In 2009, the club relocated back to Stepanakert and the Stepanakert Republican Stadium and began playing in the Artsakh Football League. However, they moved back to the Armenian First League for 2019–20, thereby voiding their 2019 Artsakh Football League season.

=== Domestic records since 1978 ===
Season	League											National Cup	Top goalscorer	
Season	Name	Div.	Pos.	Pl.	W	D	L	GS	GA	GD	P	National Cup	Name	League
1978	Karabakh	Soviet Second League	15	46	18	10	18	53	46		46			
1979	Karabakh	Soviet Second League	3	46	29	5	12	65	38		63			
1980	Karabakh	Soviet Second League	11	30	12	4	14	40	43		28			
1981	Karabakh	Soviet Second League	4	44	19	11	14	69	60		49			
1982	Karabakh	Soviet Second League	12	32	13	7	12	48	42		33			
1983	Karabakh	Soviet Second League	10	32	13	5	14	40	39		31			
1984	Karabakh	Soviet Second League	9	32	15	3	14	42	38		33			
1985	Karabakh	Soviet Second League	5	30	17	2	11	52	41		36			
1986	Karabakh	Soviet Second League	9	30	14	2	14	56	48		30			
1987	Karabakh	Soviet Second League	13	30	12	3	15	34	47		27			
1988	Karabakh	Soviet Second League	11	38	17	6	15	44	38		40			
1989	Artsakh	Soviet Second League	6	42	20	8	14	74	43		48			
1990	Artsakh	Soviet Lower Second League	4	32	19	5	8	72	35		43			
1991	Artsakh	Soviet Lower Second League	3	38	26	5	7	98	45		57			
1992	Artsakh	no participation												
1993	Artsakh	no participation												
1994	Artsakh	no participation												
1995	Artsakh	no participation												
1995-96	Karabakh	Armenian Premier League	7	22	8	5	9	29	28		29			
1996-97	Karabakh	Armenian Premier League	8	22	7	4	11	23	29		25			
1997	Karabakh	Armenian Premier League	8	18	5	3	10	13	28		18			
1998	Karabakh	Armenian Premier League	8	20	4	5	11	24	37		17			
1999	Karabakh	Armenian Premier League	XX	XX	XX	XX	XX	XX	XX	XX	XX			
2000	Karabakh	Armenian First League	2	16	12	2	2	36	14		38			
2001	Karabakh	Armenian Premier League	11	22	2	6	14	19	63		12			
2002	Lernayin Artsakh	Armenian Premier League	9	22	5	2	15	21	52		17			
2003	Lernayin Artsakh	no participation												
2004	Lernayin Artsakh	Armenian First League	2	30	22	6	2	82	20		72			
2005	Lernayin Artsakh	Armenian Premier League	9	16	3	0	13	14	37		9			
2006	Lernayin Artsakh	Armenian First League	2	18	12	3	3	57	32		39			
2007	Lernayin Artsakh	no participation												
2008	Lernayin Artsakh	no participation												
2009	Lernayin Artsakh	Artsakh Football League	1	16	15	1	0	99	12		46			
2010–2017	Lernayin Artsakh	No Participation												
2018	Lernayin Artsakh	Artsakh Football League	1	13	1	0	3	76	3		40			
2019–20	Lernayin Artsakh	Armenian First League	13	25	6	6	13	43	44	-1	24	-		
2020–21	Lernayin Artsakh	Armenian First League	5	27	12	2	13	37	50	-13	38	-	Norik Mkrtchyan	7
2021–22	Lernayin Artsakh	Armenian First League	1	28	23	4	1	65	12	+53	73	First round	Sargis Metoyan	14
2022–23	Lernayin Artsakh	Armenian Premier League	10	36	5	7	24	16	59	-43	22	First round	Yeison Racines	4
2023–24	Lernayin Artsakh	Armenian First League	4	28	18	4	6	62	27	+35	58	First round	Taiga Kitajima	12
2024–25	Lernayin Artsakh	Armenian First League	4	24	13	3	8	60	34	+26	42	Quarter-final	Akhmed Jindoyan	13

== Honours ==
- Armenian First League
  - Champions (1): 2021–22
- Artsakh Football League
  - Winners (2): 2009, 2018

== Players ==
=== Current squad ===
As of 3 August 2023

Note: Flags indicate national team as defined under FIFA eligibility rules; some limited exceptions apply. Players may hold more than one non-FIFA nationality.

No.	Pos.	Nation	Player
2	MF	ARM	Marat Karapetyan
3	DF	DMA	Tobi Jnohope
4	DF	JPN	Shogo Kagawa
5	DF	ARM	Gor Poghosyan
6	DF	ARM	Aram Kostandyan (Captain)
7	MF	ARM	Norik Mkrtchyan
8	MF	ARM	Tigran Simonyan
9	FW	BRA	Emmanuel Vieira
10	MF	CMR	Valdo Junior Ntone Bilunga
15	DF	ARM	Artur Khachatryan
16	MF	JPN	Jun Toba

No.	Pos.	Nation	Player
17	MF	ARM	Ararat Chilingaryan
18	MF	ARM	Alik Arakelyan
19	MF	COL	Sebastian Diaz
20	DF	GHA	Simon Obonde
23	GK	RUS	Vyacheslav Grigoryan
25	MF	ARM	Davit Nalbandyan
27	MF	SEN	Khalifa Ababacar Sow
33	MF	ARM	Aramayis Mardiyan
46	MF	ARM	Ashot Adamyan
66	MF	COL	Juan Palacios
95	GK	ARM	Poghos Ayvazyan

=== Other players under contract ===
Note: Flags indicate national team as defined under FIFA eligibility rules; some limited exceptions apply. Players may hold more than one non-FIFA nationality.

No.	Pos.	Nation	Player
22	DF	ARM	Tigran Hambardzumyan
51	MF	ARM	Ronald Melkumyan

No.	Pos.	Nation	Player
—	FW	ARM	Narek Ghasumyan

== See also ==
- Football in Armenia
