= Noragyugh, Nagorno-Karabakh =

Noragyugh Նորագյուղ
- Təzəbinə
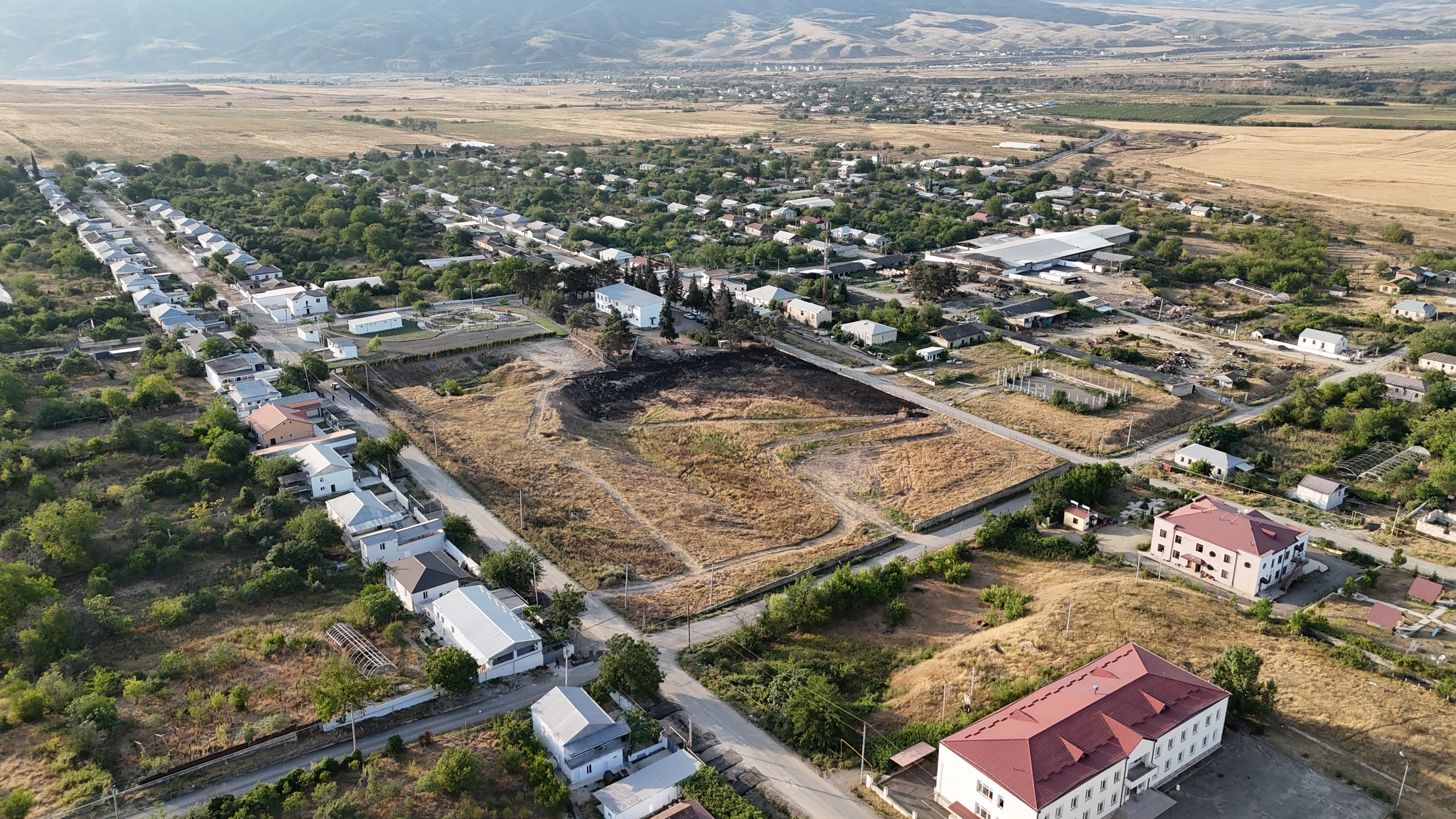
- July 2025

- Location within Azerbaijan Location within Karabakh Economic Region
- Coordinates: 39°55′39″N 46°46′41″E
- Country: Azerbaijan
  - District: Khojaly
- Elevation: 634 m (2,080 ft)

Population (2015)
  - Total: 1,517
- Time zone: UTC+4 (AZT)

Noragyugh (Armenian: Նորագյուղ) or Tazabine (Azerbaijani: Təzəbinə) is a village in the Khojaly District of Azerbaijan, in the region of Nagorno-Karabakh. Until 2023 it was controlled by the breakaway Republic of Artsakh. The village had an ethnic Armenian-majority population until the expulsion of the Armenian population of Nagorno-Karabakh by Azerbaijan following the 2023 Azerbaijani offensive in Nagorno-Karabakh.

== History ==
The modern village was founded in 1966 by settlers from the nearby village of Hin Noragyugh (Armenian: Հին Նորագյուղ, lit. 'Old Noragyugh'), which was founded in the early 1800s.

During the Soviet period, the village was a part of the Askeran District of the Nagorno-Karabakh Autonomous Oblast.

== Historical heritage sites ==
Historical heritage sites in and around the village include a 12th/13th-century khachkar, the shrine of Sare Khach (Armenian: Սարե Խաչ) from between the 12th and 20th centuries, St. George's Church (Armenian: Սուրբ Գևորգ եկեղեցի, romanized: Surb Gevorg Yekeghetsi) built in 1810, a 19th/20th-century cemetery, and a 19th-century spring monument.

== Economy and culture ==
The population is mainly engaged in agriculture and animal husbandry. As of 2015, the village has a municipal building, a house of culture, a secondary school, a music school, five shops and a medical centre. The Noragyugh branch of the Askeran Children's Music School is also located in the village.

== Demographics ==
The village had 1,396 inhabitants in 2005, and 1,517 inhabitants in 2015.

As of January 2026, 147 Azerbaijani families, comprising 650 people, have been resettled in the Tazabina village by Azerbaijan.

== Gallery ==
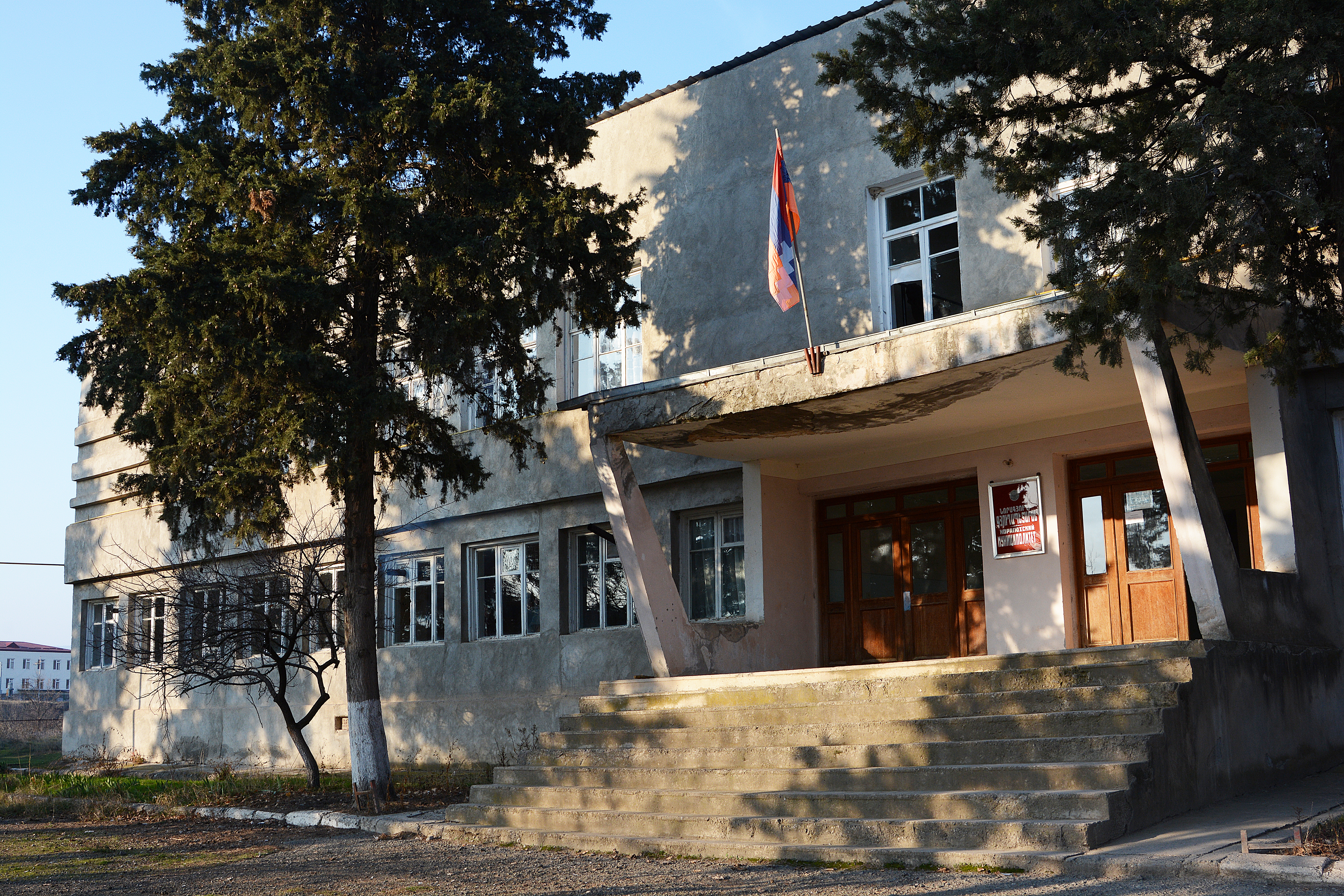
Municipality building

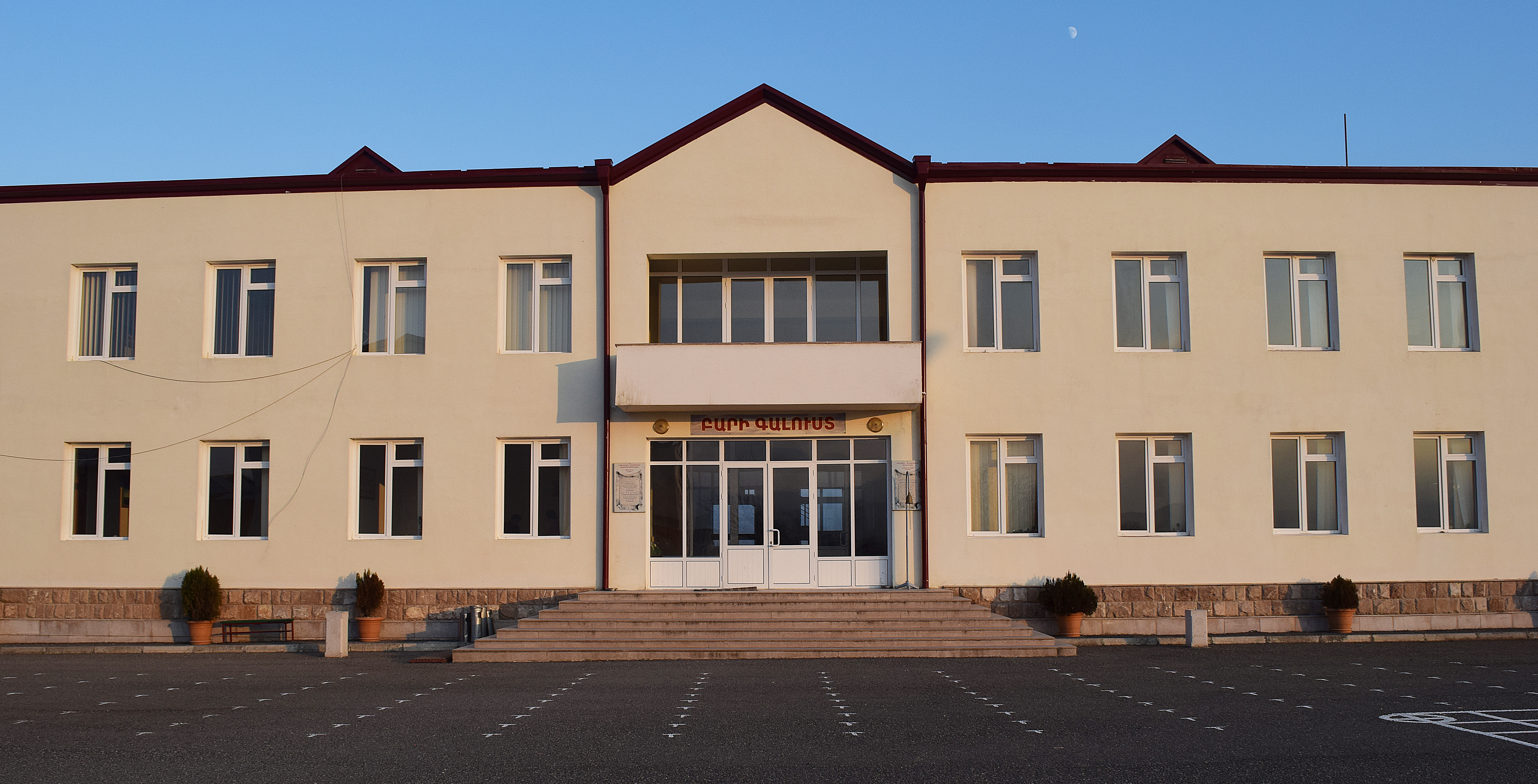
School

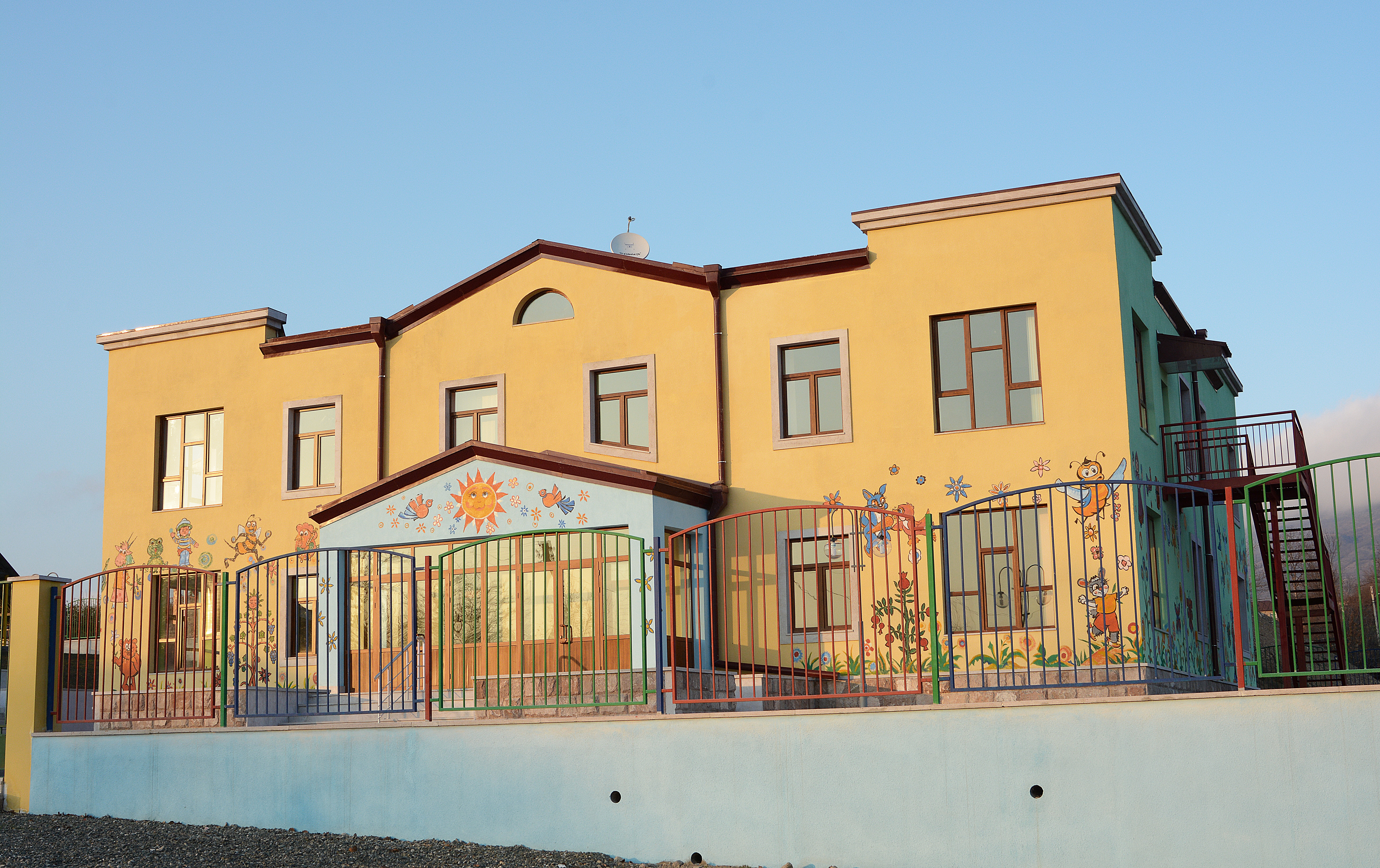
Kindergarten

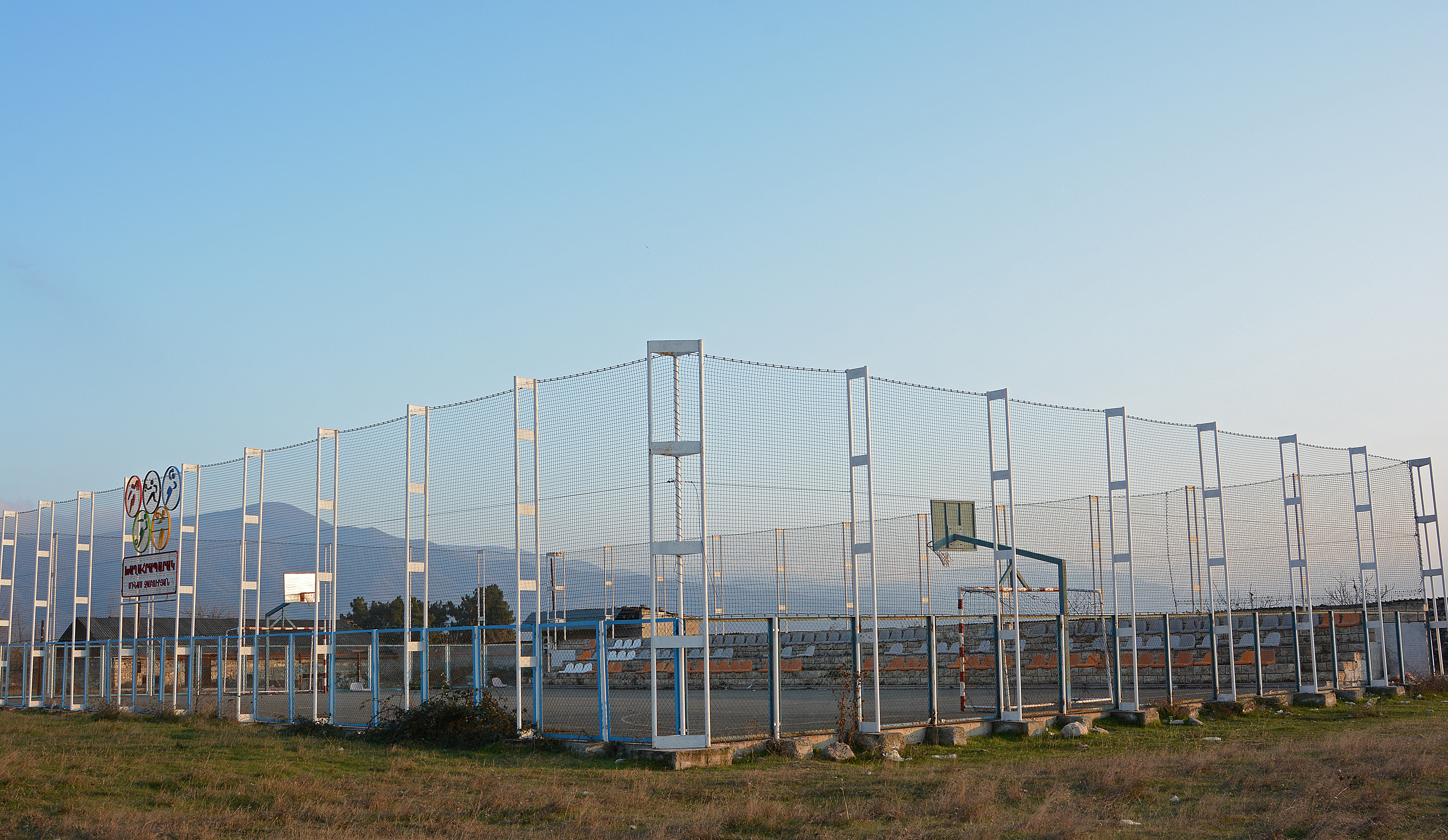
Playground

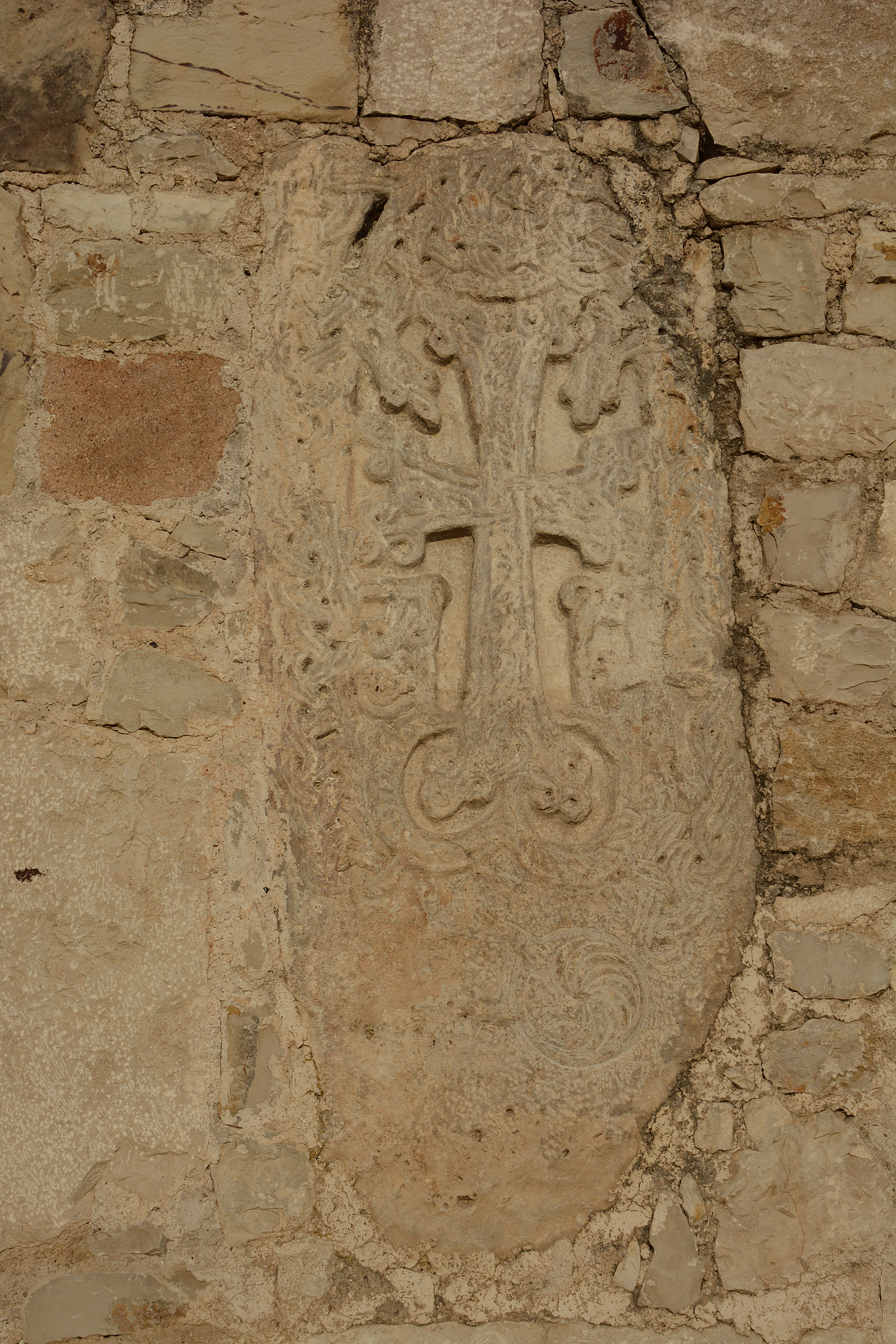
Khachkar

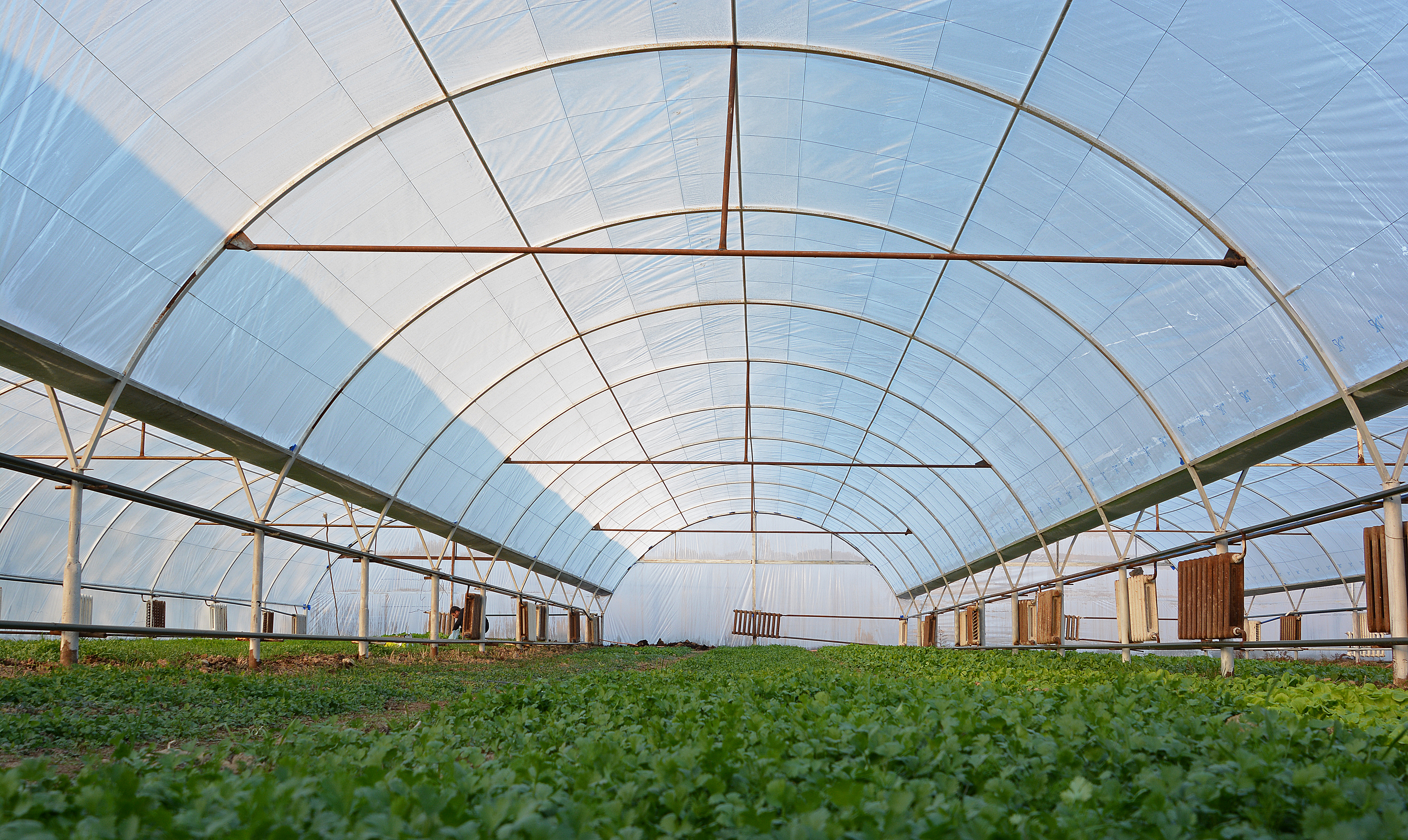
Greenhouse

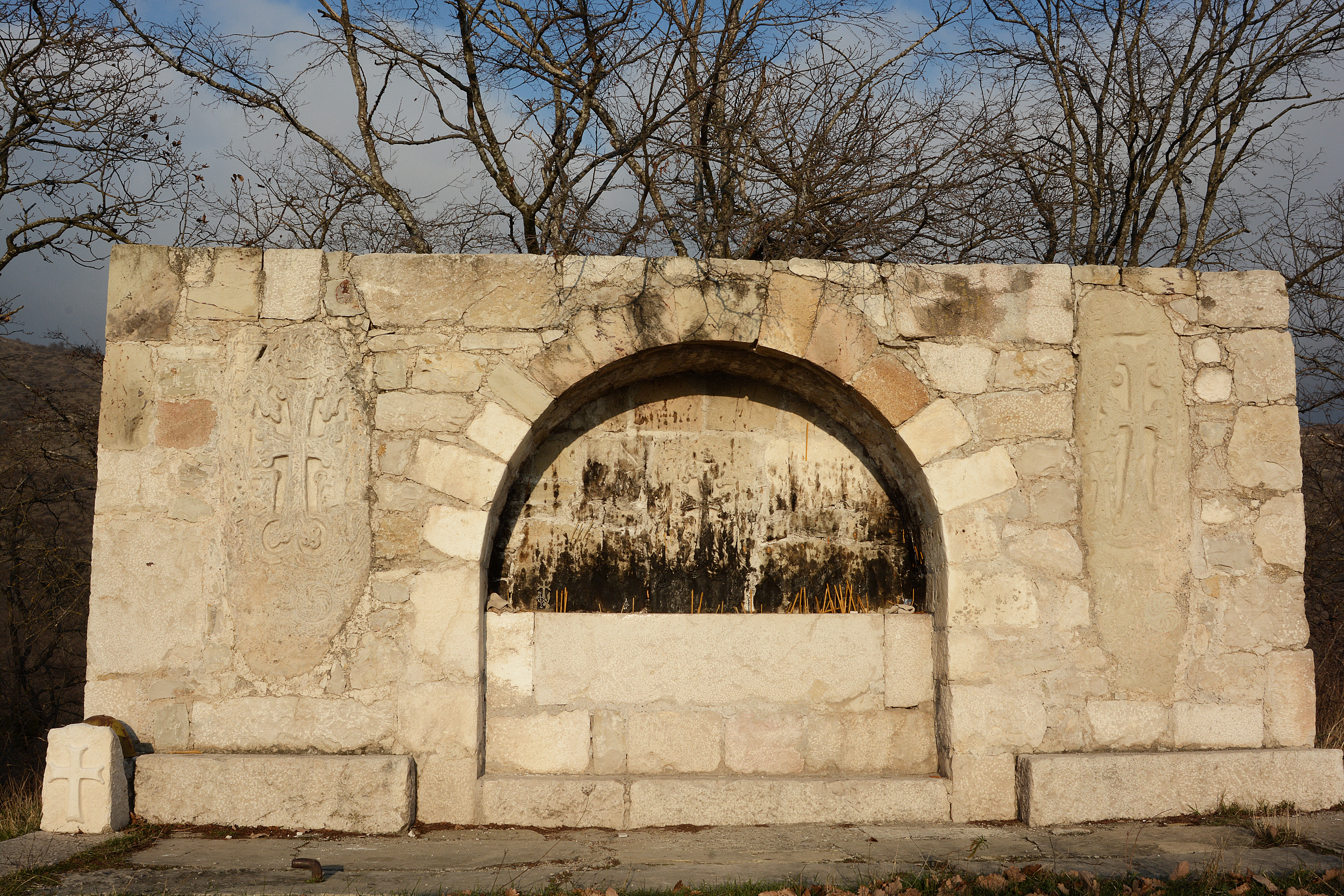
Religious shrine

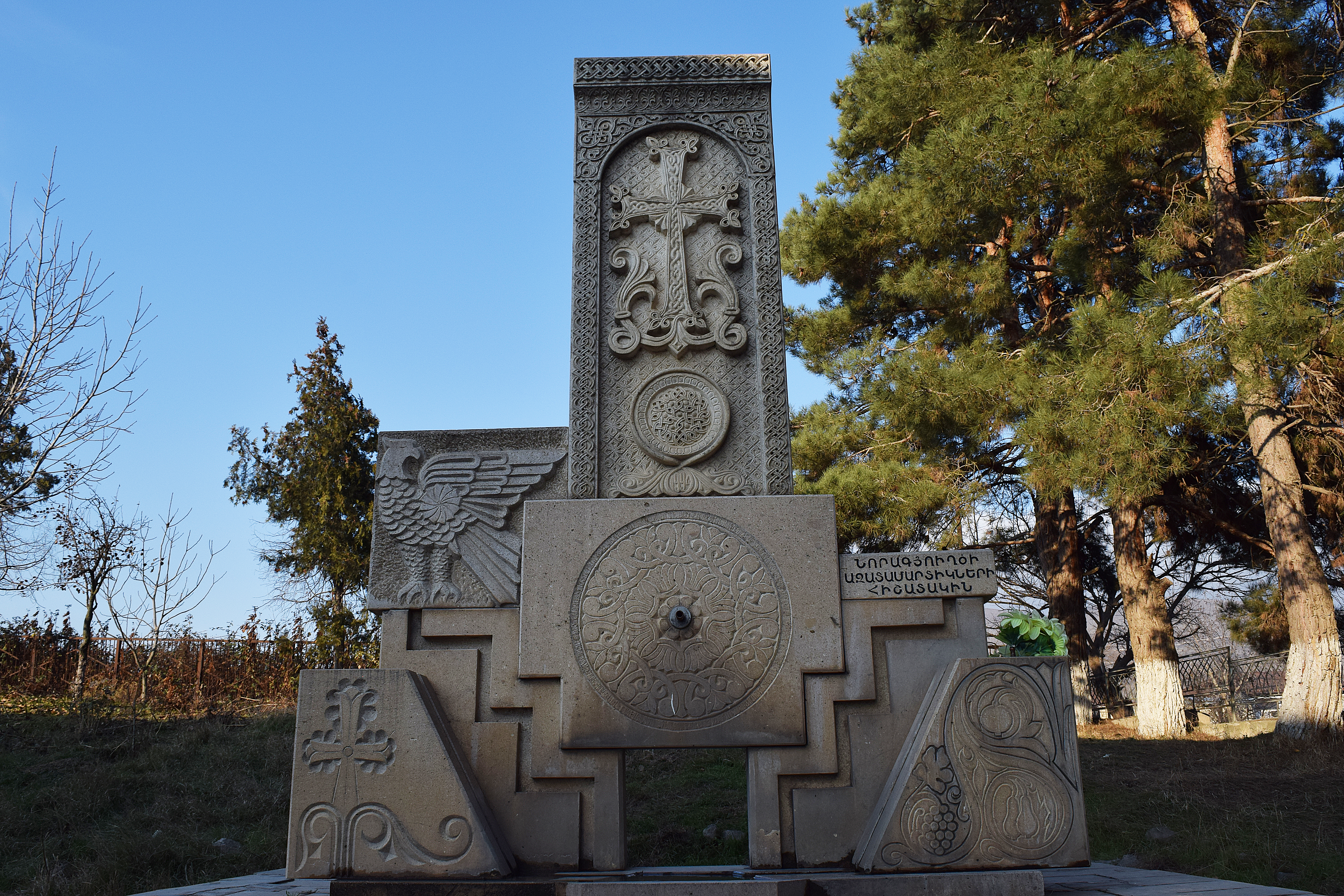
Memorial

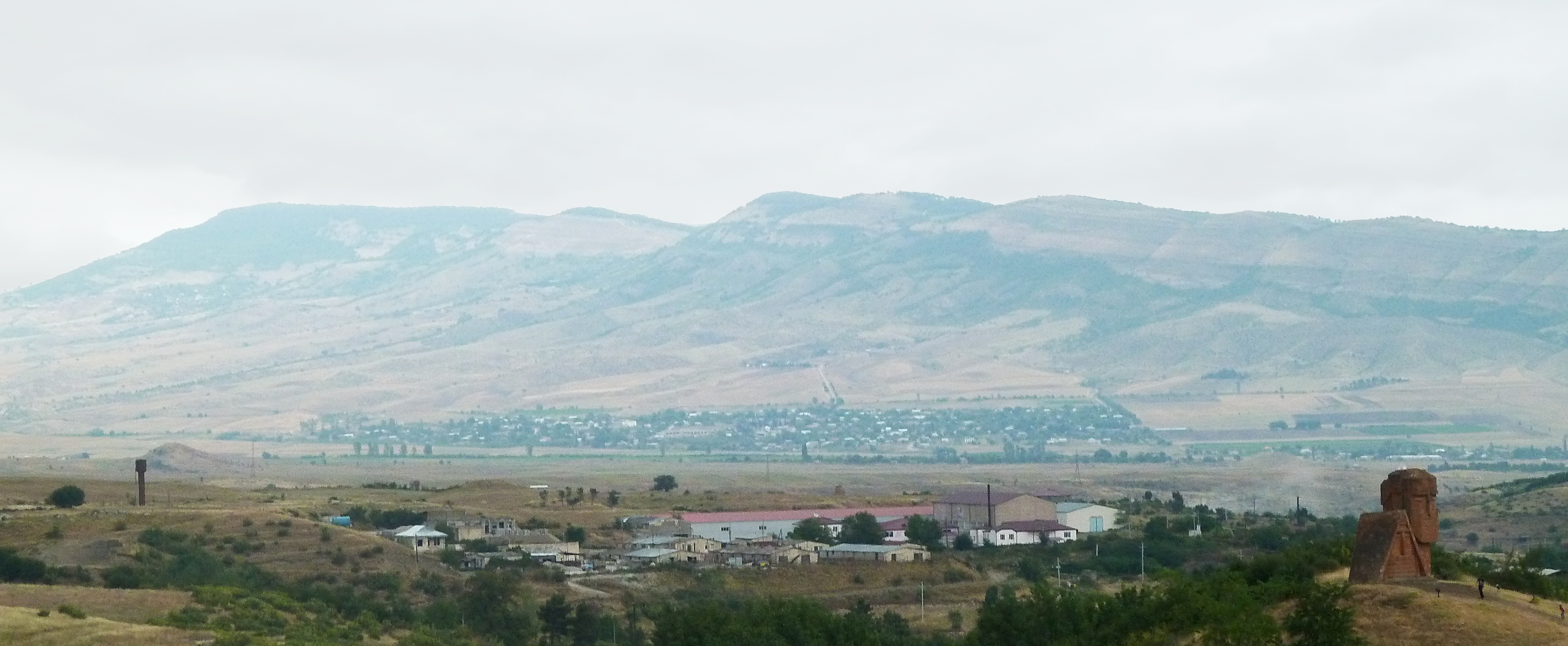
Panorama
