= Chartar =

Chartar Ճարտար
- Çartar
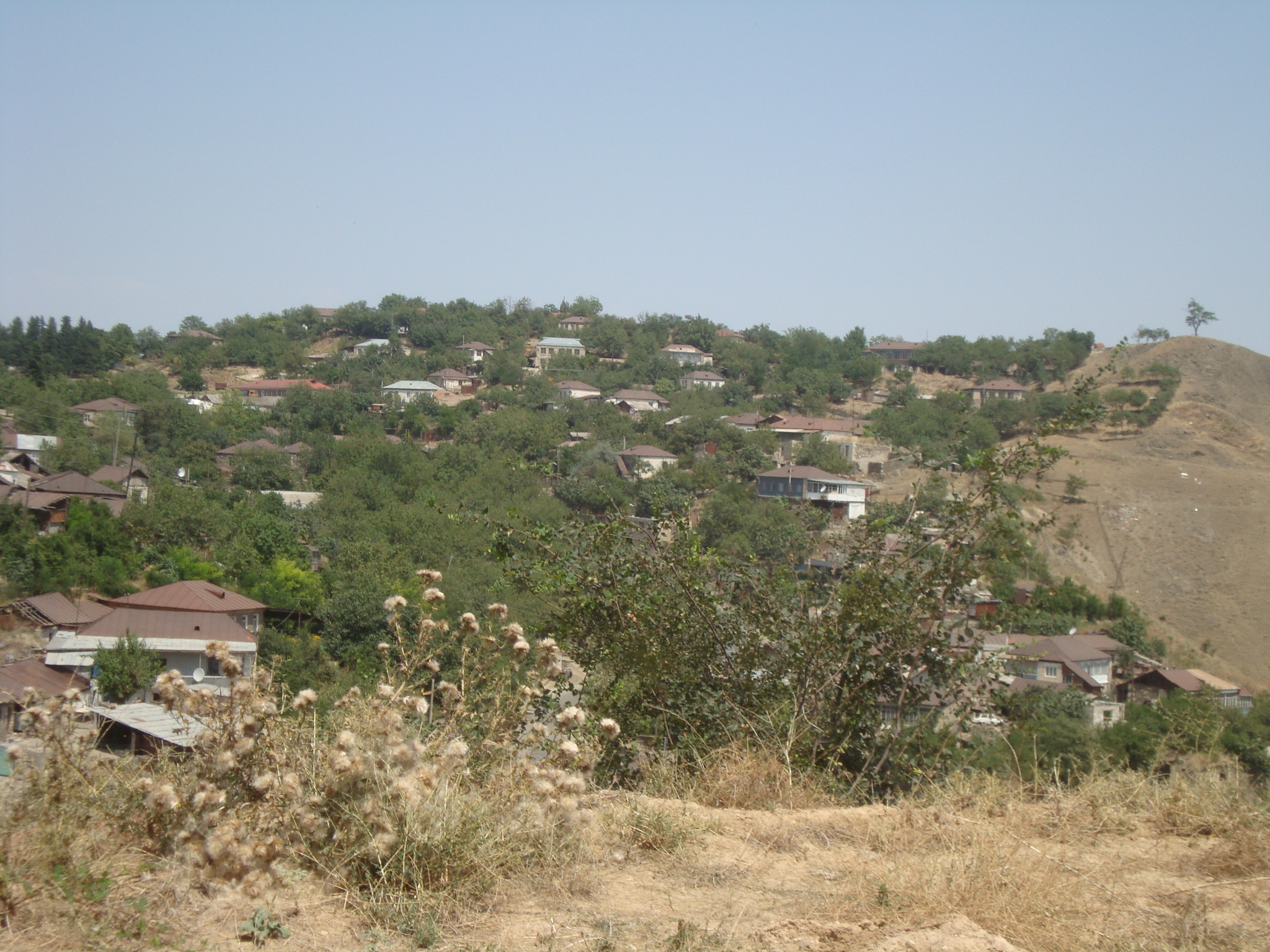

- Location within Azerbaijan
- Coordinates: 39°45′29″N 47°00′58″E
- Country: Azerbaijan
  - District: Khojavend

Population (2015)
  - Total: 4,100
- Time zone: UTC+4 (AZT)

Chartar (Armenian: Ճարտար; Azerbaijani: Çartar) is an Armenian town in the region of Nagorno-Karabakh, Azerbaijan. Until 2023 it was controlled by the breakaway Republic of Artsakh. The town had an ethnic Armenian-majority population until the expulsion of the Armenian population of Nagorno-Karabakh by Azerbaijan following the 2023 Azerbaijani offensive in Nagorno-Karabakh.

== Etymology ==
The name Chartar is of Armenian origin, meaning "dexterous, crafty".

== History ==
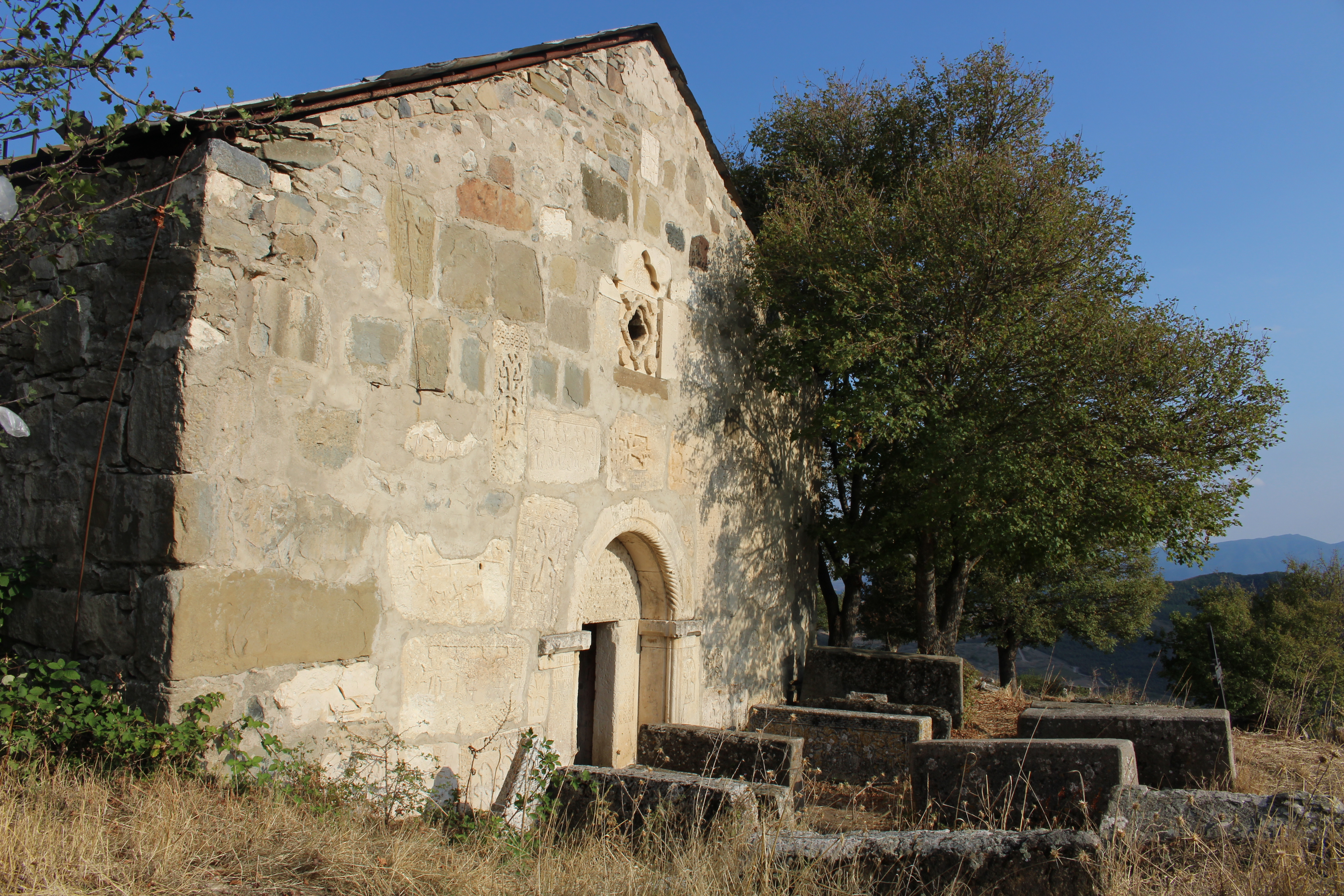
St. Yeghishe Church, built in 1655

The area of Chartar is one of ancient Armenian settlement, being home to various monasteries, churches, and khachkars from the 12th-19th centuries. Traditionally, it was part of the diocese of the Amaras Monastery. The modern town was populated by Armenians mostly from Agulis, Maghavuz, and Khachen. The town of Chartar was created out of a merger of the four villages of Ghuze Chartar, Ghuze Kaler, Gyune Chartar and Gyune Kaler.

During the Soviet period, the town was a part of the Martuni District of the Nagorno-Karabakh Autonomous Oblast.

== Historical and cultural heritage ==
Historical heritage sites in and around Chartar include Chartar Fortress (from between the 3rd and 1st centuries BCE), the Kohak Church (from between the 10th and 13th centuries), the St. Yeghishe Church from 1655, the church of Surb Amenaprkich (Armenian: Սուրբ Ամենափրկիչ, lit. 'Holy Savior') founded in 1787, and the 19th-century St. George's Church (Armenian: Սուրբ Գևորգ եկեղեցի, romanized: Surb Gevorg Yekeghetsi). The St. Vardanank Church (Armenian: Սուրբ Վարդանանք եկեղեցի, romanized: Surb Vardanank Yekeghetsi) was consecrated in 2018 in Chartar.

== Economy and culture ==
The population is mainly engaged in agriculture and animal husbandry. As of 2015, the village has a municipal building, a house of culture, five schools, an art school, two kindergartens, nine shops, a hospital, and a medical centre.

== Demographics ==
According to the Caucasian calendar for 1910, the population of the village by 1908 was 2,757 people, mostly Armenians. By the beginning of 1914, 2,350 inhabitants were recorded, also predominantly Armenians.

Chartar had 3,951 inhabitants in 2005 (with the census divided between "Chartar" with 2,213 inhabitants and "Ghuze Chartar" with 1,738 inhabitants), and 4,100 inhabitants in 2015.

== Gallery ==
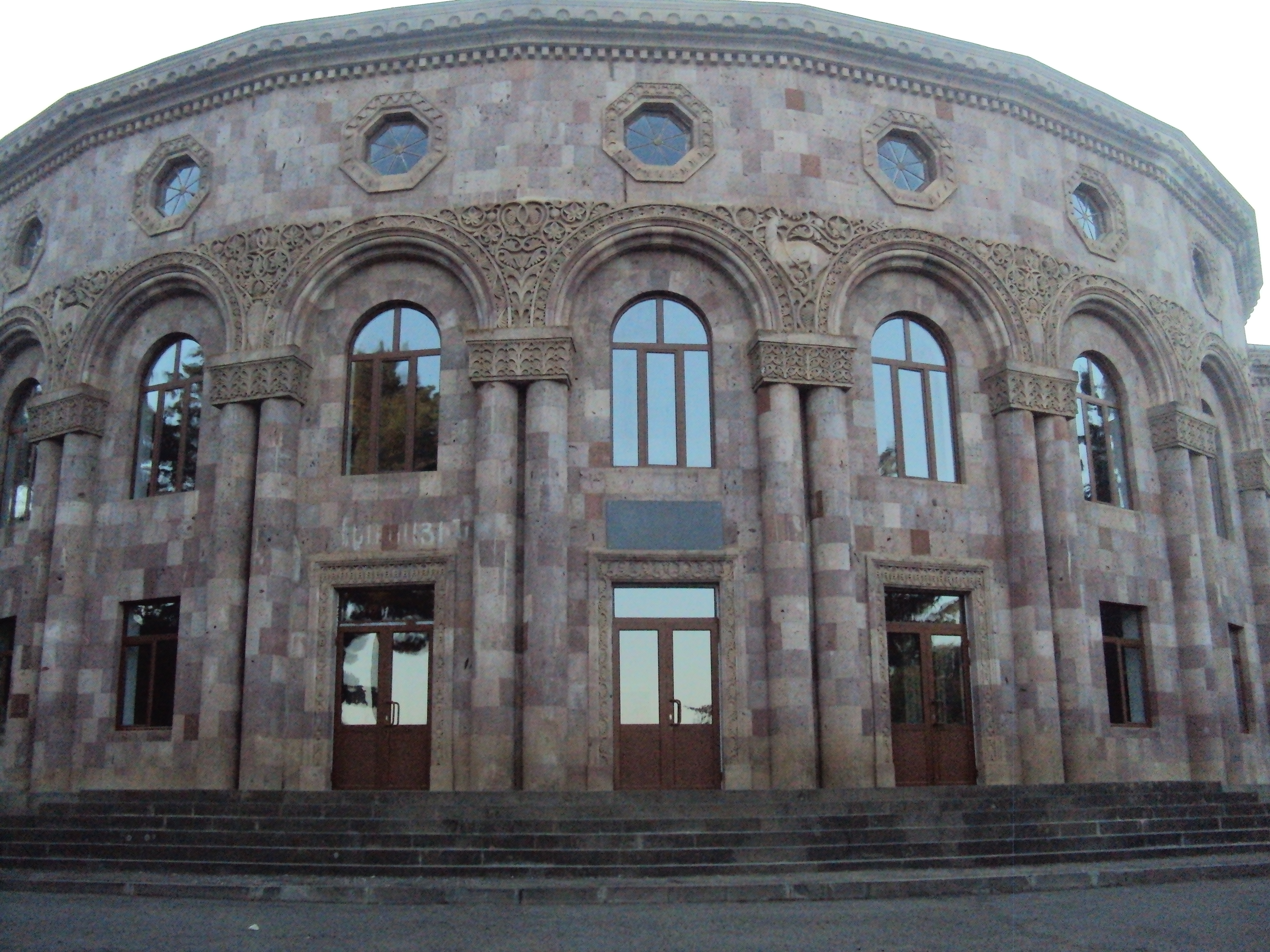
Chartar House of Culture (also called the "Sports and Cultural Palace" of Chartar)

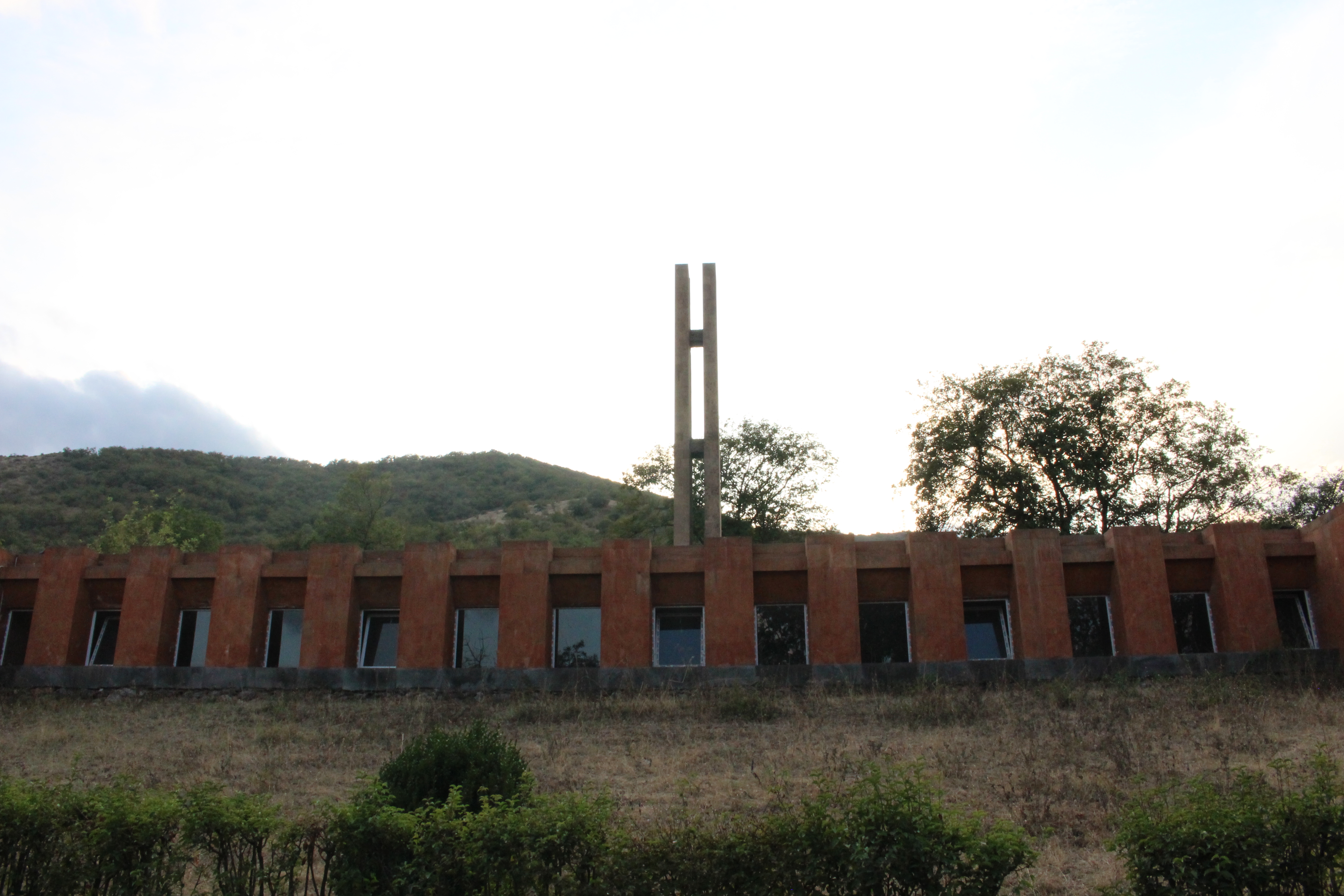
WWII monument

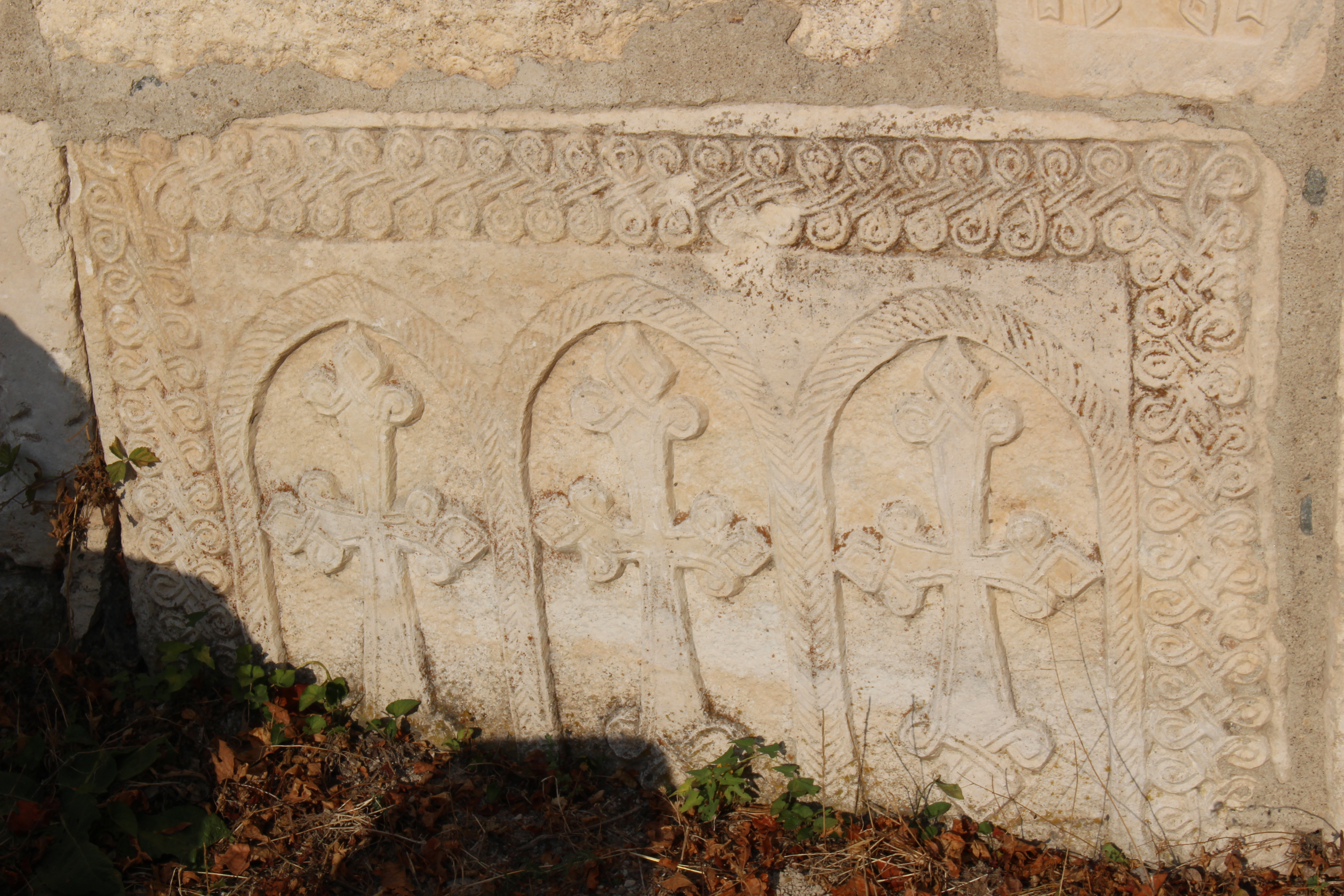
13th-century khachkar near the St. Yeghishe Church

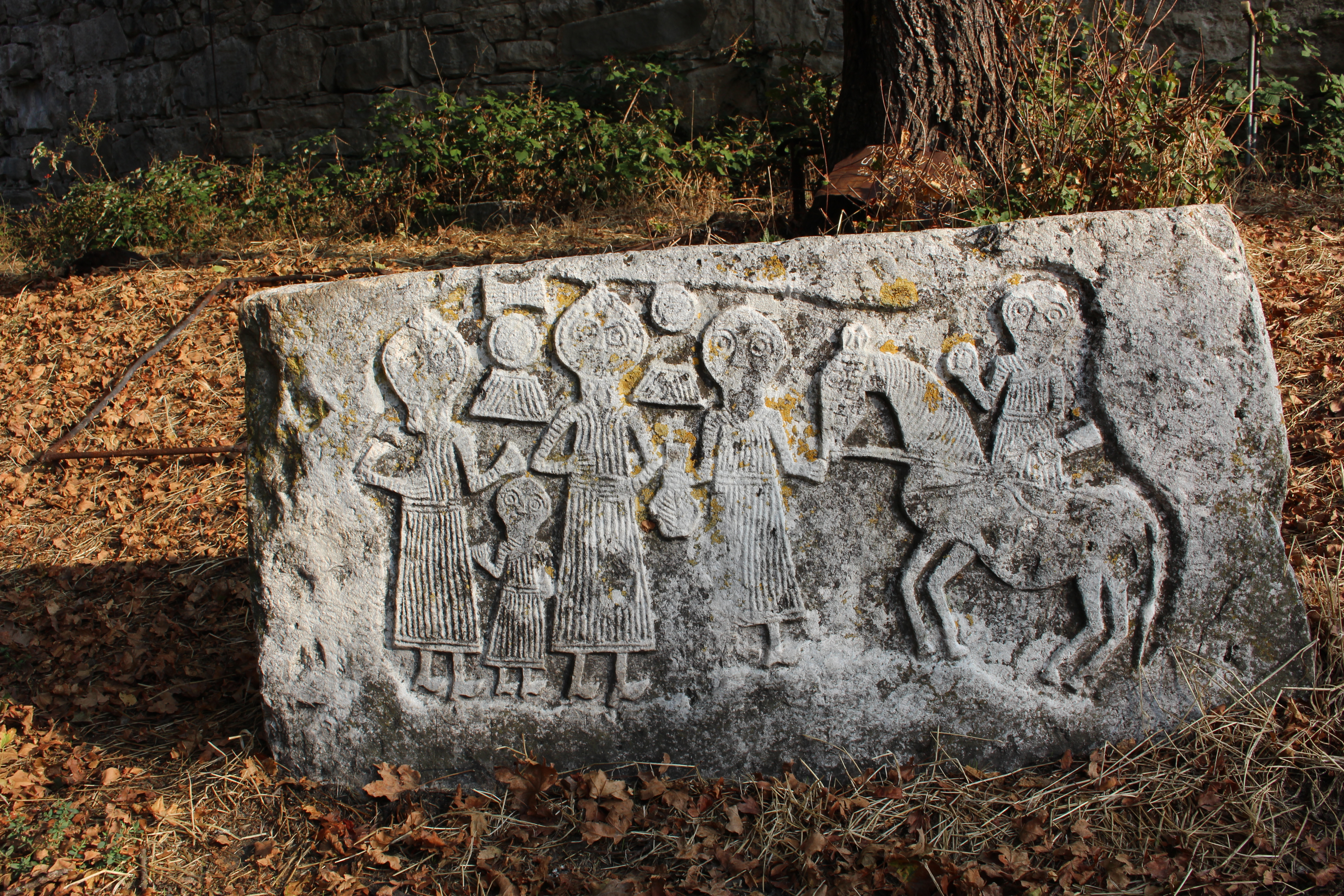
Tombstone near the St. Yeghishe Church

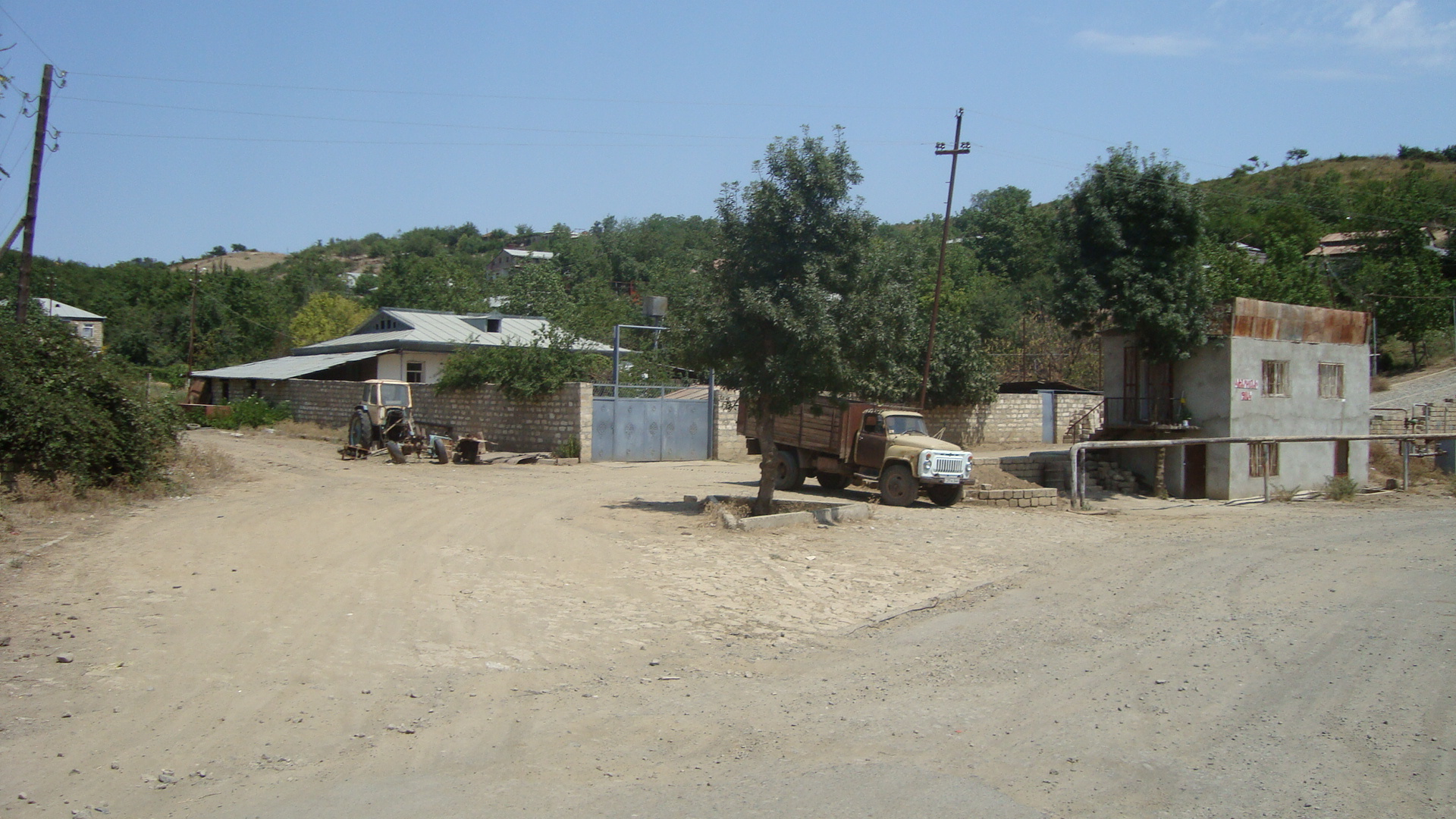
A view of the town

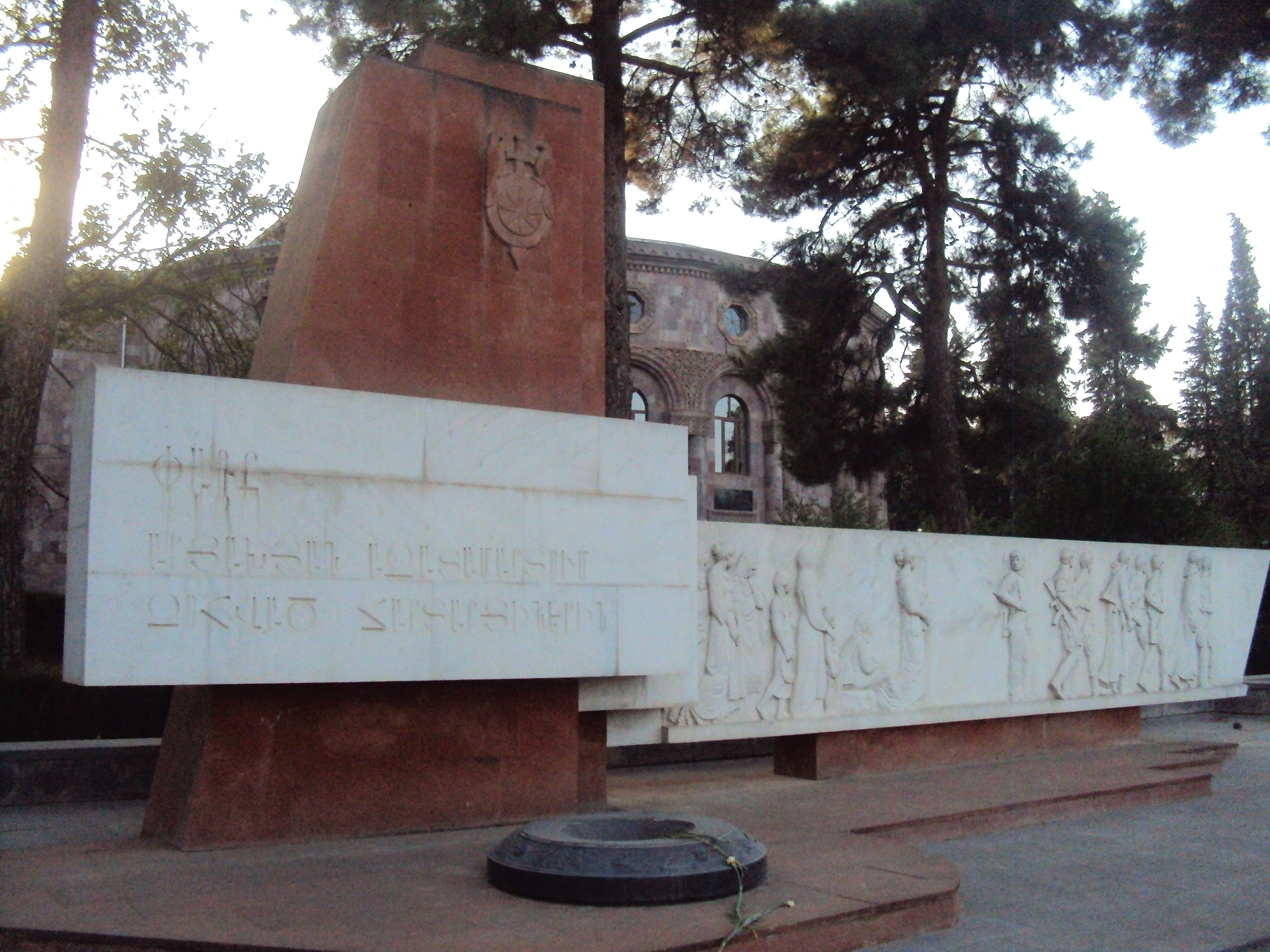
Monument to the fallen in the First Nagorno-Karabakh War

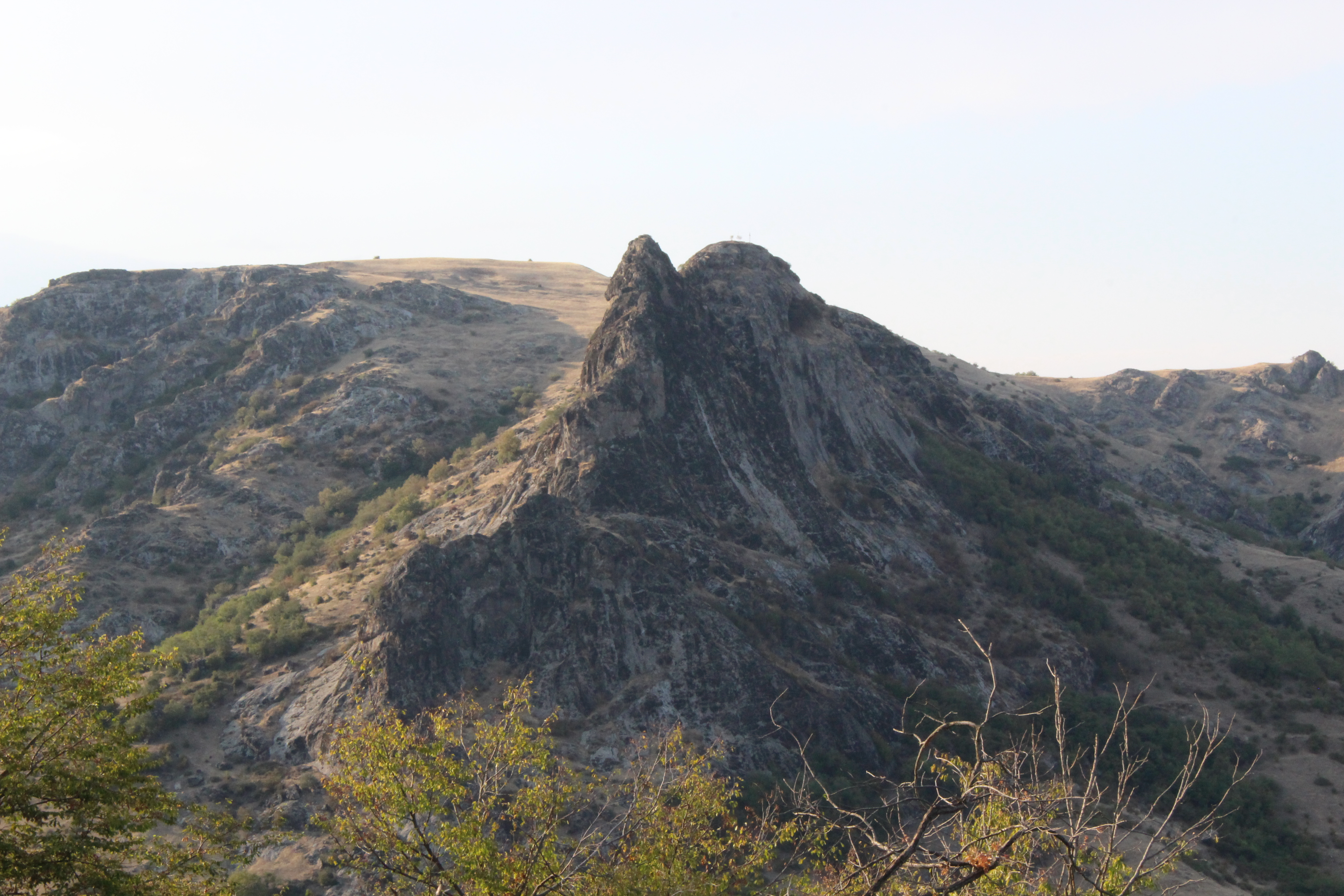
Chartar Fortress

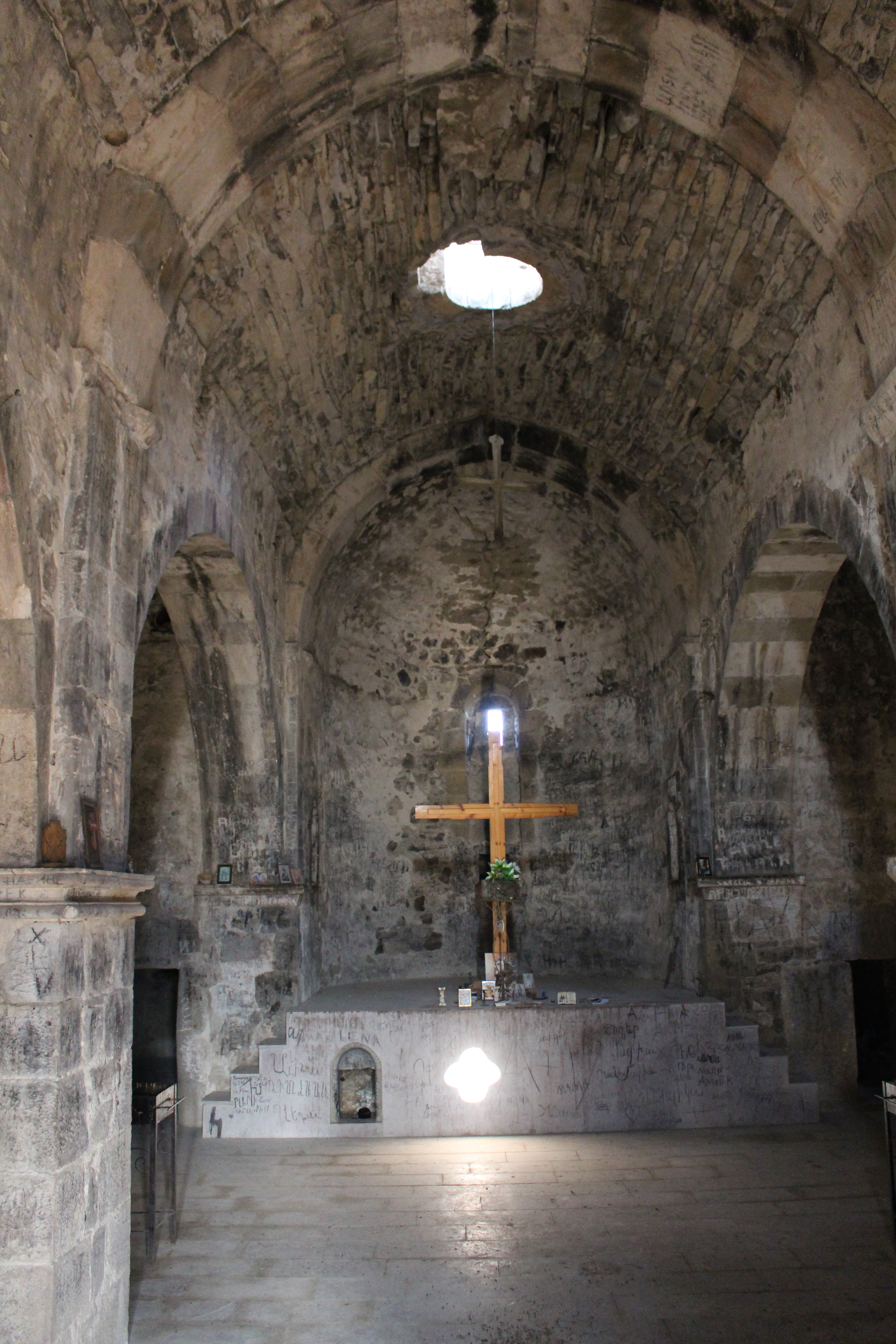
St. Yeghishe Church interior

== Notable people ==
- Yeghishe Astsatryan, Soviet Armenian statesman
- Nelson Davidyan, Olympic silver medalist and two-time world champion in Greco-Roman wrestling

== Bibliography ==
- Кавказский календарь на 1910 год [Caucasian calendar for 1910] (in Russian) (65th ed.). Tiflis: Tipografiya kantselyarii Ye.I.V. na Kavkaze, kazenny dom. 1910. Archived from the original on 15 March 2022.
- Кавказский календарь на 1915 год [Caucasian calendar for 1915] (in Russian) (70th ed.). Tiflis: Tipografiya kantselyarii Ye.I.V. na Kavkaze, kazenny dom. 1915. Archived from the original on 4 November 2021.
