= 2017–18 FC Banants season =

Banants
2017–18 season
- Chairman: Hrach Aghabekian
- Manager: Artur Voskanyan
- Stadium: Banants Stadium
- Premier League: 2nd
- Armenian Cup: Seminfinal vs Alashkert
- Top goalscorer: League: Rumyan Hovsepyan (8); All: Rumyan Hovsepyan (8)
| Home colours | Away colours |

The 2017–18 season is FC Banants's seventeenth consecutive season in the Armenian Premier League. The club finished the previous season in 2nd, qualifying for the 2017–18 UEFA Europa League first qualifying round, whilst they will also compete in the Armenian Cup.

== Squad ==
As of match played 20 May 2018

| No. | Name | Nationality | Position | Date of birth (age) | Signed from | Signed in | Contract ends | Apps. | Goals |
Goalkeepers
| 22 | Stepan Ghazaryan | (Armenia) | GK | 11 January 1985 (aged 33) | Alashkert | 2007 | | | |
| 70 | Aram Ayrapetyan | (Russia) | GK | 22 November 1986 (aged 31) | Ararat Yerevan | 2017 | | 36 | 0 |
| 91 | Henri Avagyan | (Armenia) | GK | 16 January 1996 (aged 22) | Mika | 2016 | | 4 | 0 |
Defenders
| 3 | Gevorg Khuloyan | (Armenia) | DF | 18 August 1996 (aged 21) | Academy | 2013 | | | |
| 6 | Borislav Jovanović | (Serbia) | DF | 16 August 1986 (aged 31) | AEL | 2017 | | 23 | 0 |
| 13 | Edward Kpodo | (Ghana) | DF | 14 January 1990 (aged 28) | Shirak | 2018 | | 15 | 1 |
| 15 | Gevorg Hovhannisyan | (Armenia) | DF | 16 June 1983 (aged 34) | Shirak | 2018 | | 14 | 0 |
| 21 | Artur Avagyan | (Armenia) | DF | 4 July 1987 (aged 30) | Alashkert | 2016 | | 31 | 0 |
| 23 | Narek Petrosyan | (Armenia) | DF | 25 January 1996 (aged 22) | Academy | 2015 | | 45 | 0 |
| 24 | Gagik Maghakyan | (Armenia) | DF | 7 February 1996 (aged 22) | Academy | 2016 | | 4 | 0 |
| 55 | Matvey Guyganov | (Ukraine) | DF | 28 July 1994 (aged 23) | TSK Simferopol | 2018 | | 23 | 2 |
| | Hayk Sargsyan | (Armenia) | DF | 12 March 1998 (aged 20) | Academy | 2016 | | 1 | 0 |
Midfielders
| 4 | Alexander Hovhannisyan | (Armenia) | MF | 20 July 1996 (aged 21) | Ulisses | 2016 | | 25 | 1 |
| 5 | Hakob Hakobyan | (Armenia) | MF | 29 March 1997 (aged 21) | Academy | 2014 | | | |
| 7 | Aram Bareghamyan | (Armenia) | MF | 6 January 1988 (aged 30) | Alashkert | 2016 | | | |
| 8 | Rumyan Hovsepyan | (Armenia) | MF | 13 November 1991 (aged 26) | Shirak | 2017 | | 65 | 17 |
| 9 | Ognjen Krasić | (Serbia) | MF | 9 April 1988 (aged 30) | Voždovac | 2017 | | 31 | 2 |
| 12 | Narek Grigoryan | (Armenia) | MF | 17 June 2001 (aged 16) | Academy | 2017 | | 5 | 0 |
| 14 | Karen Melkonyan | (Armenia) | MF | 16 May 1992 (aged 26) | Academy | 2016 | | 17 | 0 |
| 18 | Vahagn Ayvazyan | (Armenia) | MF | 16 April 1992 (aged 26) | Impuls | 2013 | | | |
| 19 | Wal | (Brazil) | MF | 13 January 1994 (aged 24) | loan from Colorado | 2017 | | 26 | 6 |
| 77 | Aram Loretsyan | (Armenia) | MF | 7 March 1993 (aged 25) | Ararat Yerevan | 2017 | | | |
| 90 | Kwasi Sibo | (Armenia) | MF | 24 January 1998 (aged 20) | Cheetah | 2017 | | 24 | 3 |
| | Tigran Ayunts | (Armenia) | MF | 15 March 2000 (aged 18) | Academy | 2017 | | 2 | 0 |
| | Vardan Safaryan | (Armenia) | MF | 22 April 1997 (aged 21) | Mika | 2016 | | 1 | 0 |
Forwards
| 10 | Norayr Gyozalyan | (Armenia) | FW | 15 March 1990 (aged 28) | Alashkert | 2017 | | | |
| 11 | Lester Peltier | (Trinidad and Tobago) | FW | 13 September 1988 (aged 29) | Alashkert | 2018 | | 15 | 6 |
| 16 | Martin Grigoryan | (Armenia) | FW | 25 September 2000 (aged 17) | Academy | 2016 | | 7 | 1 |
| 17 | Aleksandar Đoković | (Trinidad and Tobago) | FW | 16 December 1991 (aged 26) | Novi Pazar | 2017 | | 28 | 1 |
| 20 | Hayk Voskanyan | (Armenia) | FW | 23 June 1996 (aged 21) | Mika | 2011 | | 21 | 0 |
| 25 | Fagner Santos | (Brazil) | FW | 22 June 1998 (aged 19) | Colorado | 2018 | | 5 | 1 |
| 30 | Guilerme Torres | (Brazil) | FW | 21 April 1999 (aged 19) | Colorado | 2018 | | 0 | 0 |
Players out on loan
Players who left during the season
| 2 | Hakob Hambardzumyan | (Armenia) | DF | 26 May 1997 (aged 20) | Academy | 2016 | | 23 | 0 |
| 11 | Ghukas Poghosyan | (Armenia) | FW | 6 February 1994 (aged 24) | Shirak | 2017 | | 15 | 1 |
| 12 | Nenad Injac | (Serbia) | FW | 4 September 1985 (aged 32) | Zemun | 2017 | | 22 | 8 |
| 13 | Norik Avdalyan | (Armenia) | MF | 1 January 1996 (aged 22) | Academy | 2017 | | 1 | 0 |

== Transfers ==
=== In ===
| Date | Position | Nationality | Name | From | Fee | Ref. |
|---|---|---|---|---|---|---|
| 1 July 2017 | MF | (Armenia) | Rumyan Hovsepyan | Shirak | Undisclosed | |
| 1 July 2017 | MF | (Armenia) | Gevorg Hovhannisyan | Shirak | Undisclosed | |
| 1 July 2017 | FW | (Armenia) | Ghukas Poghosyan | Shirak | Undisclosed | |
| 1 July 2017 | FW | (Serbia) | Aleksandar Đoković | Novi Pazar | Undisclosed | |
| 8 July 2017 | MF | (Serbia) | Ognjen Krasić | Voždovac | Undisclosed | |
| 3 August 2017 | DF | (Ukraine) | Matvey Guyganov | TSK Simferopol | Undisclosed | |
| 3 August 2017 | DF | (Serbia) | Borislav Jovanović | AEL | Undisclosed | |
| 12 September 2017 | DF | (Ghana) | Kwasi Sibo | Cheetah | Undisclosed | |
| 23 February 2018 | DF | (Ghana) | Edward Kpodo | Shirak | Undisclosed | |
| 24 February 2018 | GK | (Trinidad and Tobago) | Lester Peltier | Alashkert | Undisclosed | |
| 26 February 2018 | FW | (Brazil) | Fagner Santos | Colorado | Undisclosed | |
| 4 March 2018 | FW | (Brazil) | Guilerme Torres | Colorado | Undisclosed | |

=== Loans in ===
| Date from | Position | Nationality | Name | From | Date to | Ref. |
|---|---|---|---|---|---|---|
| 8 September 2017 | MF | (Brazil) | Wal | Colorado | End of season | |

=== Out ===
| Date | Position | Nationality | Name | To | Fee | Ref. |
|---|---|---|---|---|---|---|
| 6 February 2018 | FW | (Armenia) | Ghukas Poghosyan | Gorodeya | Undisclosed | |
| 21 February 2018 | FW | (Serbia) | Nenad Injac | Navbahor Namangan | Undisclosed | |

=== Loans out ===
| Date from | Position | Nationality | Name | To | Date to | Ref. |
|---|---|---|---|---|---|---|
| 21 January 2018 | DF | (Armenia) | Hakob Hambardzumyan | Artsakh | End of season | |

=== Released ===
| Date | Position | Nationality | Name | Joined | Date |
|---|---|---|---|---|---|
| 7 December 2017 | MF | (Armenia) | Norik Avdalyan | Torpedo Yerevan | 21 July 2019 |
| 31 December 2017 | DF | (Armenia) | Zhirayr Margaryan | Shirak | 10 February 2018 |
| 31 December 2017 | MF | (Armenia) | Emil Yeghiazaryan | Artsakh | 9 February 2018 |
| 11 June 2018 | DF | (Armenia) | Gevorg Hovhannisyan | Retired | |
| 11 June 2018 | DF | (Ukraine) | Matvey Guyganov | Sevastopol | 8 August 2018 |
| 11 June 2018 | FW | (Ukraine) | Norayr Gyozalyan | Artsakh | 1 July 2018 |
| 11 June 2018 | FW | (Serbia) | Aleksandar Đoković | Mačva Šabac | 30 August 2018 |
| 11 June 2018 | FW | (Armenia) | Hayk Voskanyan | Retired | |
| 28 June 2018 | MF | (Armenia) | Rumyan Hovsepyan | Pyunik | 24 July 2018 |
| 30 June 2018 | GK | (Armenia) | Henri Avagyan | Alashkert | 1 July 2018 |
| 30 June 2018 | MF | (Armenia) | Alexander Hovhannisyan | Gandzasar Kapan | 11 August 2018 |

== Competitions ==
=== Overall record ===
| Competition | First match | Last match | Starting round | Final position | Record | | | | | | | |
| Competition | First match | Last match | Starting round | Final position | Pld | W | D | L | GF | GA | GD | Win % |
|---|---|---|---|---|---|---|---|---|---|---|---|---|
| Premier League | 6 August 2017 | 20 May 2018 | Matchday 1 | Runners-up | 30 | 11 | 11 | 8 | 42 | 43 | −1 | 36.67 |
| Armenian Cup | 20 September 2017 | 17 April 2018 | Quarterfinal | Semifinal | 4 | 1 | 1 | 2 | 4 | 4 | +0 | 25.00 |
| Total | | | | | 34 | 12 | 12 | 10 | 46 | 47 | −1 | 35.29 |

Last updated: 20 May 2018
Source: Competitions

=== Premier League ===
==== Results summary ====
| Overall | | | | | | | | Home | | | | | | Away | | | | | |
| Pld | W | D | L | GF | GA | GD | Pts | W | D | L | GF | GA | GD | W | D | L | GF | GA | GD |
|---|---|---|---|---|---|---|---|---|---|---|---|---|---|---|---|---|---|---|---|
| 30 | 11 | 11 | 8 | 42 | 34 | +8 | 44 | 7 | 7 | 1 | 25 | 11 | +14 | 4 | 4 | 7 | 17 | 23 | −6 |

==== Results ====
| 6 August 2017 1 | Banants | 2 – 2 | Pyunik | Yerevan |
| 18:00 (UTC+4) | Gyozalyan 77'; Injac 90' (yellow card) 90' | Report | A.Arakelyan 5', 47'; R.Minasyan (yellow card) 27'; V.Hayrapetyan (yellow card) 32'; S.Spertsyan (yellow card) 86' | Stadium: Banants Stadium; Attendance: 500; Referee: Artur Simonyan |

| 13 August 2017 2 | Shirak | 1 – 0 | Banants | Gyumri |
| 17:30 (UTC+4) | V.Bakalyan 9'; A.Davoyan (yellow card) 39'; A.Ayvazov (yellow card) 90+4' | Report | Injac (yellow card) 39'; Krasić (yellow card) 51' | Stadium: Gyumri City Stadium; Attendance: 500; Referee: Artur Safaryan |

| 18 August 2017 3 | Banants | 2 – 2 | Alashkert | Yerevan |
| 17:00 (UTC+4) | Krasić (yellow card) 69'; Poghosyan 70'; Guyganov 78'; N.Petrosyan (yellow card) 86' | Report | Arta.Yedigaryan 8' (yellow card) 43'; Nenadović 58'; Khovbosha (yellow card) 82' | Stadium: Banants Stadium; Attendance: 1,000; Referee: Gevorg Eghoyan |

| 27 August 2017 4 | Banants | 1 – 1 | Gandzasar Kapan | Yerevan |
| 17:00 (UTC+4) | M.Guydanov (yellow card) 51'; Hovsepyan 60'; V.Ayvazyan (yellow card) 88' | Report | Musonda (yellow card) 22'; G.Harutyunyan 25'; A.Khachatryan (yellow card) 53'; S.Shahinyan (yellow card) 61'; Ishkhanyan (yellow card) 71'; Wbeymar (yellow card) 73' | Stadium: Banants Stadium; Attendance: 700; Referee: Zaven Hovhannisyan |

| 9 September 2017 5 | Ararat Yerevan | 1 – 2 | Banants | Yerevan |
| 16:00 (UTC+4) | An.Kocharyan 31' (pen.); R.Safaryan (yellow card) 81'; Ar.Kocharyan (yellow card) 90+5' | Report | M.Guydanov (yellow card) 17'; Krasić (yellow card) 20'; Hovsepyan 46' (yellow card) 66'; A.Avagyan (yellow card) 58'; V.Ayvazyan 68'; Đoković (yellow card) 90+5' | Stadium: Mika Stadium; Attendance: 300; Referee: Artur Simonyan |

| 15 September 2017 6 | Pyunik | 1 – 2 | Banants | Yerevan |
| 18:00 (UTC+4) | Grigoryan (yellow card) 36'; R.Minasyan (yellow card) 45' (goal) 70' | Report | Gyozalyan 28', 31' (pen.); Wal (yellow card) 86' | Stadium: Vazgen Sargsyan Republican Stadium; Attendance: 300; Referee: Suren Baliyan |

| 27 September 2017 7 | Banants | 3 – 0 | Shirak | Yerevan |
| 16:00 (UTC+4) | Đoković 32'; V.Ayvazyan (yellow card) 48'; Sibo (yellow card) 60' (goal) 82'; A.Loretsyan (yellow card) 66'; M.Guydanov (yellow card) 68'; Gyozalyan 90' | Report | M.Safaryan (yellow card) 45'; Kpodo (yellow card) 47' | Stadium: Banants Stadium; Attendance: 300; Referee: Artur Simonyan |

| 30 September 2017 8 | Alashkert | 2 – 0 | Banants | Yerevan |
| 16:00 (UTC+4) | Arta.Yedigaryan 42' (pen.); Khovbosha (yellow card) 51'; Peltier 62'; Jablan (yellow card) 70'; Simonyan (yellow card) 84'; Daghbashyan (yellow card) 88' | Report | Jovanović (yellow card) 41'; Sibo (yellow card) 45' | Stadium: Alashkert Stadium; Attendance: 500; Referee: Zaven Hovhannisyan |

| 14 October 2017 9 | Gandzasar Kapan | 2 – 0 | Banants | Yerevan |
| 19:00 (UTC+4) | Junior 60'; G.Harutyunyan (yellow card) 71' (goal) 83'; A.Khachatryan (yellow card) 74' | Report | Injac (yellow card) 2'; Jovanović (yellow card) 90+4' | Stadium: Vazgen Sargsyan Republican Stadium; Attendance: 400; Referee: Zaven Hovhannisyan |

| 20 October 2017 10 | Banants | 0 – 0 | Ararat Yerevan | Yerevan |
| 15:00 (UTC+4) | Krasić (yellow card) 36'; Sibo (yellow card) 63'; Wal (yellow card) 68'; Hovsepyan (yellow card) 72' | Report | | Stadium: Banants Stadium; Attendance: 300; Referee: Artur Simonyan |

| 28 October 2017 11 | Banants | 1 – 1 | Pyunik | Yerevan |
| 15:00 (UTC+4) | Injac (yellow card) 31'; Sibo (yellow card) 43'; Hovsepyan 73'; G. Hovhannisyan (yellow card) 80' | Report | Grigoryan (yellow card) 7'; Avetisyan 67'; A.Kartashyan (yellow card) 83' | Stadium: Banants Stadium; Attendance: 300; Referee: Artur Simonyan |

| 5 November 2017 12 | Shirak | 0 – 1 | Banants | Gyumri |
| 15:00 (UTC+4) | A.Amiryan (yellow card) 22'; A.Davoyan (yellow card) 35'; A.Muradyan (yellow card) 77' | Report | N.Petrosyan (yellow card) 3'; Krasić (yellow card) 35'; Jovanović (yellow card) 38'; Wal 81' | Stadium: Gyumri City Stadium; Referee: Gevorg Eghoyan |

| 17 November 2017 13 | Banants | 2 – 2 | Alashkert | Yerevan |
| 15:00 (UTC+4) | Jovanović (yellow card) 8'; Injac 38'; Hovsepyan (yellow card) 80'; M.Grigoryan 89' | Report | Arta.Yedigaryan 27', 58'; Artu.Yedigaryan (yellow card) 37'; Jablan (yellow card) 44'; K.Veranyan (yellow card) 79' | Stadium: Banants Stadium; Attendance: 500; Referee: Zaven Hovhannisyan |

| 26 November 2017 14 | Banants | 1 – 1 | Gandzasar Kapan | Yerevan |
| 15:00 (UTC+4) | Krasić (yellow card) 40'; G. Hovhannisyan (yellow card) 53'; Injac 65'; Guyganov (yellow card) 72'; Đoković (yellow card) 73'; V.Ayvazyan (yellow card) 81' | Report | Junior (yellow card) 18'; G.Harutyunyan 31' (yellow card) 54'; A.Khachatryan (yellow card) 56'; Musonda (yellow card) 90+1' | Stadium: Banants Stadium; Attendance: 300; Referee: Artur Simonyan |

| 3 December 2017 15 | Ararat Yerevan | 2 – 3 | Banants | Yerevan |
| 14:00 (UTC+4) | V.Chopuryan (yellow card) 15'; G.Kirakosyan 17', 90+2'; R.Avagyan (yellow card) 76' | Report | Sibo (yellow card) 17'; Hovsepyan 32', 70'; H.Voskanyan (yellow card) 57'; Wal 90+4' (pen.) | Stadium: Alashkert Stadium; Attendance: 300; Referee: Henrik Nalbandyan |

| 28 February 2018 16 | Pyunik | 2 – 0 | Banants | Yerevan |
| 14:00 (UTC+4) | Avetisyan (yellow card) 25' (goal) 28', 88' (pen.); R.Hakobyan (yellow card) 51'; Mkrtchyan (yellow card) 66'; Baldé (yellow card) 84' | Report | A.Loretsyan (yellow card) 8'; H.Voskanyan (yellow card) 40'; Hovsepyan (yellow card) 78'; A.Avagyan (yellow card) 85' | Stadium: Vazgen Sargsyan Republican Stadium; Attendance: 300; Referee: Suren Baliyan |

| 4 March 2018 17 | Banants | 3 – 0 | Shirak | Yerevan |
| 14:00 (UTC+4) | Gyozalyan 19'; Hovsepyan 21'; Sibo (yellow card) 23' (goal) 89' | Report | | Stadium: Banants Stadium; Attendance: 300; Referee: Zaven Hovhannisyan |

| 11 March 2018 18 | Alashkert | 2 – 2 | Banants | Yerevan |
| 15:00 (UTC+4) | M.Manasyan 36'; Simonyan 38'; T.Voskanyan (yellow card) 43'; Artu.Yedigaryan (yellow card) 70'; Nenadović (yellow card) 77'; K.Veranyan (yellow card) 89' | Report | V.Ayvazyan 21'; A.Bareghamyan 28'; Peltier (yellow card) 61' | Stadium: Alashkert Stadium; Attendance: 800; Referee: Suren Baliyan |

| 18 March 2018 19 | Gandzasar Kapan | 2 – 2 | Banants | Gyumri |
| 14:00 (UTC+4) | Junior 33' (pen.); G.Harutyunyan 44'; Ishkhanyan (yellow card) 71' | Report | V.Ayvazyan (yellow card) 32'; Wal 39', 72' (pen.); Kpodo (yellow card) 88' | Stadium: Gyumri City Stadium; Attendance: 50; Referee: Zaven Hovhannisyan |

| 1 April 2018 20 | Banants | 2 – 0 | Ararat Yerevan | Yerevan |
| 15:00 (UTC+4) | Wal 23' (pen.); H.Voskanyan (yellow card) 45'; H. Hakobyan (yellow card) 70'; Peltier 72' (pen.) | Report | Dragojević (yellow card) 22'; An.Kocharyan (yellow card) 63'; Obradović (yellow card) 69'; Alan (yellow card) 71' | Stadium: Banants Stadium; Attendance: 500; Referee: Artur Safaryan |

| 4 April 2018 21 | Banants | 2 – 0 | Pyunik | Yerevan |
| 15:00 (UTC+4) | Jovanović (yellow card) 41'; Peltier (yellow card) 44' (goal) 78'; Ayrapetyan (yellow card) 52'; Hovsepyan 54' | Report | V.Voskonyan (yellow card) 78' | Stadium: Banants Stadium; Attendance: 700; Referee: Suren Baliyan |

| 8 April 2018 22 | Shirak | 1 – 0 | Banants | Gyumri |
| 14:00 (UTC+4) | Stanojević 39' (yellow card) 51'; Udo (yellow card) 74' | Report | Kpodo (yellow card) 32'; H. Hakobyan (yellow card) 37'; Jovanović (yellow card) 45+2' | Stadium: Gyumri City Stadium; Attendance: 700; Referee: Zaven Hovhannisyan |

| 14 April 2018 23 | Banants | 3 – 0 | Alashkert | Yerevan |
| 16:00 (UTC+4) | Peltier 13'; Guyganov (yellow card) 36'; N.Petrosyan (yellow card) 42'; Krasić 51'; V.Ayvazyan (yellow card) 53'; Sibo 83' | Report | Čančarević (yellow card) 78'; Stojković (yellow card) 85' | Stadium: Banants Stadium; Attendance: 800; Referee: Gevorg Eghoyan |

| 22 April 2018 24 | Banants | 1 – 0 | Gandzasar Kapan | Yerevan |
| 17:00 (UTC+4) | Guyganov (yellow card) 13' (goal) 76'; Kpodo (yellow card) 58' | Report | V.Minasyan (yellow card) 25'; D.Terteryan (yellow card) 67'; Kasparov (yellow card) 75'; Yuspashyan (yellow card) 75' | Stadium: Banants Stadium; Attendance: 700; Referee: Artur Simonyan |

| 28 April 2018 25 | Ararat Yerevan | 2 – 1 | Banants | Yerevan |
| 17:00 (UTC+4) | An.Kocharyan 56', 86' (pen.) | Report | Wal 24' | Stadium: Alashkert Stadium; Attendance: 300; Referee: Artur Safaryan |

| 2 May 2018 26 | Pyunik | 2 – 1 | Banants | Yerevan |
| 20:00 (UTC+4) | A.Nadiryan (yellow card) 37'; Kadio 81'; Diarrassouba 88'; V.Voskonyan (yellow card) 90+1' | Report | Kpodo 66'; N.Petrosyan (yellow card) 87' | Stadium: Vazgen Sargsyan Republican Stadium; Attendance: 200; Referee: Artur Simonyan |

| 5 May 2018 27 | Banants | 0 – 2 | Shirak | Yerevan |
| 17:00 (UTC+4) | A.Hovhannisyan (yellow card) 42'; Peltier (yellow card) 53'; Ayrapetyan (yellow card) 87' | Report | Z.Margaryan (yellow card) 19'; Mkoyan (yellow card) 38'; M.Bakayoko (yellow card) 53' (goal) 64'; Udo 88' | Stadium: Banants Stadium; Attendance: 500; Referee: Suren Baliyan |

| 8 May 2018 28 | Alashkert | 2 – 2 | Banants | Yerevan |
| 17:00 (UTC+4) | Nenadović 61'; M.Manasyan 79'; Škvorc (yellow card) 90+1' | Report | Peltier 14', 45+1'; Krasić (yellow card) 34'; V.Ayvazyan (yellow card) 54'; A.Bareghamyan (yellow card) 78' | Stadium: Alashkert Stadium; Attendance: 300; Referee: Suren Baliyan |

| 12 May 2018 29 | Gandzasar Kapan | 1 – 1 | Banants | Yerevan |
| 17:00 (UTC+4) | D.Terteryan (yellow card) 21'; Bamba 90+4' | Report | Fagner Santos 31'; Ayrapetyan (yellow card) 79'; Kpodo (yellow card) 84' | Stadium: Vazgen Sargsyan Republican Stadium; Attendance: 300; Referee: Zaven Hovhannisyan |

| 20 May 2018 30 | Banants | 2 – 0 | Ararat Yerevan | Yerevan |
| 17:00 (UTC+4) | Hovsepyan 7'; Peltier 26'; A.Bareghamyan (yellow card) 85' | Report | G.Ohanyan (yellow card) 78' | Stadium: Banants Stadium; Attendance: 150; Referee: Gevorg Eghoyan |

==== Table ====
| Pos | Team | Pld | W | D | L | GF | GA | GD | Pts | Qualification |
|---|---|---|---|---|---|---|---|---|---|---|
| 1 | Alashkert (C) | 30 | 14 | 8 | 8 | 44 | 31 | +13 | 50 | Qualification for the Champions League first qualifying round |
| 2 | Banants | 30 | 11 | 11 | 8 | 42 | 34 | +8 | 44 | Qualification for the Europa League first qualifying round (Note: Gandzasar Kapan qualified for the Europa League first qualifying round by winning the 2017–18 Armenian Cup.) |
| 3 | Gandzasar Kapan | 30 | 11 | 10 | 9 | 43 | 34 | +9 | 43 | Qualification for the Europa League first qualifying round |
| 4 | Shirak | 30 | 14 | 8 | 8 | 37 | 31 | +6 | 38 (Note: Shirak were deducted 12 points on decision of Disciplinary Committee, upheld on May 18, due to match fixing scandal.) | |
| 5 | Pyunik | 30 | 9 | 9 | 12 | 37 | 41 | −4 | 36 | Qualification for the Europa League first qualifying round |
| 6 | Ararat Yerevan | 30 | 5 | 6 | 19 | 33 | 65 | −32 | 21 | |

Source: Soccerway
Rules for classification: 1) Points; 2) Play-off (only if deciding champion); 3) Matches won; 4) Head-to-head points; 5) Head-to-head matches won; 6) Head-to-head goal difference; 7) Head-to-head goals scored; 8) Head-to-head away goals scored; 9) Goal difference; 10) Goals scored.
(C) Champions

=== Armenian Cup ===
| 20 September 2017 Quarterfinal 1st leg | Pyunik | 0 – 0 | Banants | Yerevan |
| 18:00 (UTC+4) | Grigoryan (yellow card) 19'; H.Ilangyozyan (yellow card) 43' | Report | Poghosyan (yellow card) 71'; Hovsepyan (yellow card) 81' | Stadium: Vazgen Sargsyan Republican Stadium; Attendance: 300; Referee: Gevorg Eghoyan |

| 25 October 2017 Quarterfinal 2nd leg | Banants | 4 – 2 (4 – 2 agg.) | Pyunik | Yerevan |
| 15:00 (UTC+4) | Injac 8', 24'; Hovsepyan 44'; G. Hovhannisyan (yellow card) 82'; Krasić 86' | Report | A.Manucharyan (yellow card) 34'; Avetisyan 40' (pen.), 89' (yellow card) 41'; D.Terteryan (yellow card) 67'; Vardanyan (yellow card) 81' | Stadium: Banants Stadium; Attendance: 300; Referee: Zaven Hovhannisyan |

| 8 March 2018 Semifinal 1st leg | Banants | 0 – 1 | Alashkert | Yerevan |
| 15:00 (UTC+4) | Krasić (yellow card) 17'; Wal (yellow card) 34'; Peltier (yellow card) 90' | Report | T.Voskanyan (yellow card) 16'; Zeljković (yellow card) 39'; Dashyan 58' | Stadium: Banants Stadium; Attendance: 1,000; Referee: Artur Simonyan |

| 17 April 2018 Semifinal 2nd leg | Alashkert | 1 – 0 (2 – 0 agg.) | Banants | Yerevan |
| 16:00 (UTC+4) | Arta.Yedigaryan 40'; Zeljković (yellow card) 57'; Voskanyan (yellow card) 80' | Report | Sibo (yellow card) 64'; Ayrapetyan (yellow card) 84'; A.Bareghamyan (yellow card) 90+5' | Stadium: Alashkert Stadium; Attendance: 250; Referee: Zaven Hovhannisyan |

== Statistics ==
As of match played 20 May 2018

=== Appearances and goals ===
| No. | Pos | Nat | Player | Total | | Premier League | | Armenian Cup | |
| No. | Pos | Nat | Player | Apps | Goals | Apps | Goals | Apps | Goals |
|---|---|---|---|---|---|---|---|---|---|
| 4 | MF | (Armenia) ARM | Alexander Hovhannisyan | 10 | 0 | 4+6 | 0 | 0 | 0 |
| 5 | MF | (Armenia) ARM | Hakob Hakobyan | 23 | 0 | 10+10 | 0 | 1+2 | 0 |
| 6 | DF | (Serbia) SRB | Borislav Jovanović | 23 | 0 | 20 | 0 | 3 | 0 |
| 7 | MF | (Armenia) ARM | Aram Bareghamyan | 20 | 1 | 13+4 | 1 | 3 | 0 |
| 8 | MF | (Armenia) ARM | Rumyan Hovsepyan | 31 | 9 | 27+1 | 8 | 2+1 | 1 |
| 9 | MF | (Serbia) SRB | Ognjen Krasić | 31 | 2 | 25+2 | 1 | 4 | 1 |
| 10 | FW | (Armenia) ARM | Norayr Gyozalyan | 21 | 5 | 10+7 | 5 | 2+2 | 0 |
| 11 | FW | (Trinidad and Tobago) TTO | Lester Peltier | 15 | 6 | 12+1 | 6 | 1+1 | 0 |
| 12 | MF | (Armenia) ARM | Narek Grigoryan | 5 | 0 | 0+4 | 0 | 0+1 | 0 |
| 13 | DF | (Ghana) GHA | Edward Kpodo | 15 | 1 | 13 | 1 | 2 | 0 |
| 14 | MF | (Armenia) ARM | Karen Melkonyan | 10 | 0 | 3+7 | 0 | 0 | 0 |
| 15 | DF | (Armenia) ARM | Gevorg Hovhannisyan | 14 | 0 | 10+3 | 0 | 1 | 0 |
| 16 | FW | (Armenia) ARM | Martin Grigoryan | 3 | 1 | 0+3 | 1 | 0 | 0 |
| 17 | FW | (Serbia) SRB | Aleksandar Đoković | 28 | 1 | 17+8 | 1 | 1+2 | 0 |
| 18 | MF | (Armenia) ARM | Vahagn Ayvazyan | 30 | 2 | 22+5 | 2 | 3 | 0 |
| 19 | MF | (Brazil) BRA | Wal | 26 | 6 | 17+5 | 6 | 4 | 0 |
| 20 | FW | (Armenia) ARM | Hayk Voskanyan | 12 | 0 | 4+7 | 0 | 0+1 | 0 |
| 21 | DF | (Armenia) ARM | Artur Avagyan | 13 | 0 | 8+2 | 0 | 3 | 0 |
| 22 | GK | (Armenia) ARM | Stepan Ghazaryan | 9 | 0 | 9 | 0 | 0 | 0 |
| 23 | DF | (Armenia) ARM | Narek Petrosyan | 21 | 0 | 18+2 | 0 | 0+1 | 0 |
| 24 | DF | (Armenia) ARM | Gagik Maghakyan | 2 | 0 | 2 | 0 | 0 | 0 |
| 25 | FW | (Brazil) BRA | Fagner Santos | 5 | 1 | 3+2 | 1 | 0 | 0 |
| 55 | DF | (Ukraine) UKR | Matvey Guyganov | 23 | 2 | 19+1 | 2 | 3 | 0 |
| 70 | GK | (Armenia) ARM | Aram Ayrapetyan | 25 | 0 | 21 | 0 | 4 | 0 |
| 77 | MF | (Armenia) ARM | Aram Loretsyan | 11 | 0 | 3+6 | 0 | 1+1 | 0 |
| 90 | MF | (Ghana) GHA | Kwasi Sibo | 24 | 3 | 20 | 3 | 4 | 0 |
| | MF | (Armenia) ARM | Tigran Ayunts | 2 | 0 | 0+2 | 0 | 0 | 0 |
Players who left Banants during the season:
| 2 | DF | (Armenia) ARM | Hakob Hambardzumyan | 5 | 0 | 3+2 | 0 | 0 | 0 |
| 11 | FW | (Armenia) ARM | Ghukas Poghosyan | 15 | 1 | 10+4 | 1 | 1 | 0 |
| 12 | FW | (Serbia) SRB | Nenad Injac | 10 | 5 | 7+2 | 3 | 1 | 2 |
| 13 | MF | (Armenia) ARM | Norik Avdalyan | 1 | 0 | 0+1 | 0 | 0 | 0 |

=== Goal scorers ===
| Place | Position | Nation | Number | Name | Premier League | Armenian Cup | Total |
|---|---|---|---|---|---|---|---|
| 1 | MF | (Armenia) | 8 | Rumyan Hovsepyan | 8 | 1 | 9 |
| 2 | MF | (Brazil) | 19 | Wal | 6 | 0 | 6 |
| 2 | FW | (Trinidad and Tobago) | 11 | Lester Peltier | 6 | 0 | 6 |
| 4 | FW | (Armenia) | 10 | Norayr Gyozalyan | 5 | 0 | 5 |
| 4 | FW | (Serbia) | 12 | Nenad Injac | 3 | 2 | 5 |
| 6 | MF | (Ghana) | 90 | Kwasi Sibo | 3 | 0 | 3 |
| 7 | MF | (Armenia) | 18 | Vahagn Ayvazyan | 2 | 0 | 2 |
| 7 | DF | (Ukraine) | 55 | Matvey Guyganov | 2 | 0 | 2 |
| 7 | MF | (Serbia) | 9 | Ognjen Krasić | 1 | 1 | 2 |
| 10 | FW | (Serbia) | 17 | Aleksandar Đoković | 1 | 0 | 1 |
| 10 | FW | (Armenia) | 11 | Ghukas Poghosyan | 1 | 0 | 1 |
| 10 | FW | (Armenia) | 16 | Martin Grigoryan | 1 | 0 | 1 |
| 10 | MF | (Armenia) | 7 | Aram Bareghamyan | 1 | 0 | 1 |
| 10 | DF | (Ghana) | 13 | Edward Kpodo | 1 | 0 | 1 |
| 10 | FW | (Brazil) | 25 | Fagner Santos | 1 | 0 | 1 |
| | | | | TOTALS | 42 | 4 | 46 |

=== Clean sheets ===
| Place | Position | Nation | Number | Name | Premier League | Armenian Cup | Total |
|---|---|---|---|---|---|---|---|
| 1 | GK | (Armenia) | 70 | Aram Ayrapetyan | 7 | 1 | 8 |
| 2 | GK | (Armenia) | 22 | Stepan Ghazaryan | 2 | 0 | 2 |
| | | | | TOTALS | 9 | 1 | 10 |

=== Disciplinary record ===
| Number | Nation | Position | Name | Premier League | | Armenian Cup | | Total | |
| Number | Nation | Position | Name | Yellow card | Red card | Yellow card | Red card | Yellow card | Red card |
| 4 | (Armenia) | MF | Alexander Hovhannisyan | 1 | 0 | 0 | 0 | 1 | 0 |
| 5 | (Armenia) | MF | Hakob Hakobyan | 2 | 0 | 0 | 0 | 2 | 0 |
| 6 | (Serbia) | DF | Borislav Jovanović | 6 | 0 | 0 | 0 | 6 | 0 |
| 7 | (Armenia) | MF | Aram Bareghamyan | 2 | 0 | 1 | 0 | 3 | 0 |
| 8 | (Armenia) | MF | Rumyan Hovsepyan | 5 | 0 | 1 | 0 | 6 | 0 |
| 9 | (Serbia) | MF | Ognjen Krasić | 6 | 0 | 1 | 0 | 7 | 0 |
| 11 | (Trinidad and Tobago) | FW | Lester Peltier | 3 | 0 | 1 | 0 | 4 | 0 |
| 13 | (Ghana) | DF | Edward Kpodo | 4 | 0 | 0 | 0 | 4 | 0 |
| 15 | (Armenia) | DF | Gevorg Hovhannisyan | 2 | 0 | 1 | 0 | 3 | 0 |
| 17 | (Serbia) | FW | Aleksandar Đoković | 2 | 0 | 0 | 0 | 2 | 0 |
| 18 | (Armenia) | MF | Vahagn Ayvazyan | 6 | 0 | 0 | 0 | 6 | 0 |
| 19 | (Brazil) | MF | Wal | 2 | 0 | 1 | 0 | 3 | 0 |
| 20 | (Armenia) | FW | Hayk Voskanyan | 3 | 0 | 0 | 0 | 3 | 0 |
| 21 | (Armenia) | DF | Artur Avagyan | 2 | 0 | 0 | 0 | 2 | 0 |
| 23 | (Armenia) | DF | Narek Petrosyan | 4 | 0 | 0 | 0 | 4 | 0 |
| 55 | (Ukraine) | DF | Matvey Guyganov | 6 | 0 | 0 | 0 | 6 | 0 |
| 70 | (Armenia) | GK | Aram Ayrapetyan | 3 | 0 | 1 | 0 | 4 | 0 |
| 77 | (Armenia) | MF | Aram Loretsyan | 2 | 0 | 0 | 0 | 2 | 0 |
| 90 | (Ghana) | MF | Kwasi Sibo | 6 | 0 | 1 | 0 | 7 | 0 |
Players who left Banants during the season:
| 11 | (Armenia) | FW | Ghukas Poghosyan | 0 | 0 | 1 | 0 | 1 | 0 |
| 12 | (Serbia) | FW | Nenad Injac | 5 | 0 | 0 | 0 | 5 | 0 |
| | | | TOTALS | 72 | 0 | 9 | 0 | 81 | 0 |
