= 2018–19 FC Banants season =

Banants
2018-19 season
- Chairman: Hrach Aghabekian
- Manager: Artur Voskanyan (until 11 August); Ilshat Fayzulin (Caretaker) (11 August-5 September); Ilshat Fayzulin (from 5 September)
- Stadium: Banants Stadium
- Premier League: 3rd
- Armenian Cup: Semifinal vs Lori
- Europa League: First qualifying round vs Sarajevo
- Top goalscorer: League: Three Players (5); All: Vahagn Ayvazyan (6)

The 2018–19 season was FC Banants's eighteenth consecutive season in the Armenian Premier League.

== Season events ==
On 11 August 2018, Ilshat Fayzulin was appointed as Banants caretaker manager following the resignation of Artur Voskanyan. On 5 September, Fayzulin was confirmed as the new permanent head coach of Banants.

== Squad ==
As of match played 30 May 2019

No.	Name	Nationality	Position	Date of birth (age)	Signed from	Signed in	Contract ends	Apps.	Goals
Goalkeepers
1	Anatoliy Ayvazov	(Armenia)	GK	8 June 1996 (aged 22)	Shirak	2018		9	0
22	Stepan Ghazaryan	(Armenia)	GK	11 January 1985 (aged 34)	Alashkert	2007			
70	Aram Ayrapetyan	(Armenia)	GK	22 November 1986 (aged 32)	Ararat Yerevan	2017		62	0
Defenders
3	Albert Gadzhibekov	(Russia)	DF	17 February 1988 (aged 31)	loan from Armavir	2019		15	1
4	Andranik Voskanyan	(Armenia)	DF	11 April 1990 (aged 29)	Alashkert	2019		5	0
6	Borislav Jovanović	(Serbia)	DF	16 August 1986 (aged 32)	AEL	2017		36	0
13	Edward Kpodo	(Ghana)	DF	14 January 1990 (aged 29)	Shirak	2018		47	4
21	Artur Avagyan	(Armenia)	DF	4 July 1987 (aged 31)	Alashkert	2016		43	0
23	Narek Petrosyan	(Armenia)	DF	25 January 1996 (aged 23)	Academy	2015		72	0
24	Gagik Maghakyan	(Armenia)	DF	7 February 1996 (aged 23)	Academy	2016		4	0
99	Robert Darbinyan	(Armenia)	DF	4 October 1995 (aged 23)	Ararat-Armenia	2019		12	0
Midfielders
5	Hakob Hakobyan	(Armenia)	MF	29 March 1997 (aged 22)	Academy	2014			
7	Aram Bareghamyan	(Armenia)	MF	6 January 1988 (aged 31)	Alashkert	2016			
10	Karen Melkonyan	(Armenia)	MF	16 May 1992 (aged 27)	Academy	2016		43	4
14	Adamu Abdullahi	(Nigeria)	MF	1 January 1994 (aged 25)	Waiheke United	2018		20	3
16	Pape Camara	(Senegal)	MF	24 September 1991 (aged 27)	RFC Seraing	2018		25	1
18	Vahagn Ayvazyan	(Armenia)	MF	16 April 1992 (aged 27)	Impuls	2013			
19	Welat Cagro	(Belgium)	MF	31 May 1999 (aged 19)	KAA Gent	2019		10	0
20	Igor Stanojević	(Serbia)	MF	24 October 1991 (aged 27)	Shirak	2018		26	3
25	Solomon Udo	(Nigeria)	MF	15 July 1995 (aged 23)	Shirak	2018		32	2
26	Narek Grigoryan	(Armenia)	MF	17 June 2001 (aged 17)	Academy	2017		6	0
Forwards
8	Vardan Pogosyan	(Armenia)	FW	8 March 1992 (aged 27)	Gandzasar Kapan	2019		2	1
9	Yevgeni Kobzar	(Russia)	FW	9 August 1992 (aged 26)	Spartaks Jūrmala	2019		13	2
15	Nathaniel Asamoah	(Ghana)	FW	22 February 1990 (aged 29)	Aduana Stars	2018		19	2
17	Ilie Damașcan	(Moldova)	FW	12 October 1995 (aged 23)	Zimbru Chișinău	2019		11	0
78	Aleksandar Glišić	(Bosnia and Herzegovina)	FW	3 September 1992 (aged 26)	Radnik Bijeljina	2019		13	5
Banants-2 Players
5	Albert Arzumanyan	(Russia)	DF	27 May 1998 (aged 21)	loan from Armavir	2018		0	0
9	Erik Petrosyan	(Armenia)	FW	19 February 1998 (aged 21)	Pyunik	2018		9	2
22	Grigori Matevosyan	(Russia)	GK	9 June 1999 (aged 19)	loan from Armavir	2018		0	0
Players out on loan
Players who left during the season
3	Dmytro Khovbosha	(Ukraine)	DF	5 February 1989 (aged 30)	Avanhard Kramatorsk	2018		0	0
8	Aram Loretsyan	(Armenia)	MF	7 March 1993 (aged 26)	Ararat Yerevan	2017			
10	Ognjen Krasić	(Serbia)	MF	9 April 1988 (aged 31)	Voždovac	2017		33	2
11	Lester Peltier	(Trinidad and Tobago)	FW	13 September 1988 (aged 30)	Alashkert	2018		17	6
16	Fagner Santos	(Brazil)	FW	22 June 1998 (aged 20)	Colorado	2018		6	1
19	Wal	(Brazil)	MF	13 January 1994 (aged 25)	loan from Colorado	2017		44	11
33	Ilya Gultyayev	(Russia)	DF	5 September 1988 (aged 30)	Tambov	2018		11	0
78	Mikhail Solovyov	(Russia)	MF	7 April 1997 (aged 22)	loan from Armavir	2018	2018	17	1
90	Kwasi Sibo	(Armenia)	MF	24 January 1998 (aged 21)	Cheetah	2017		26	3
	Erik Gharibyan	(Armenia)	DF	23 April 1999 (aged 20)	Academy	2018		0	0

== Transfers ==
=== In ===
Date	Position	Nationality	Name	From	Fee	Ref.
5 June 2018	FW	(Armenia)	Erik Petrosyan	Pyunik	Undisclosed	
13 June 2018	MF	(Nigeria)	Solomon Udo	Shirak	Undisclosed	
14 June 2018	DF	(Ukraine)	Dmytro Khovbosha	Avanhard Kramatorsk	Undisclosed	
15 June 2018	MF	(Serbia)	Igor Stanojević	Shirak	Undisclosed	
20 June 2018	GK	(Armenia)	Anatoliy Ayvazov	Shirak	Undisclosed	
26 July 2018	FW	(Ghana)	Nathaniel Asamoah	Aduana Stars	Undisclosed	
27 July 2018	MF	(Nigeria)	Adamu Abdullahi	Waiheke United	Undisclosed	
29 August 2018	MF	(Senegal)	Pape Camara		Free	
5 September 2018	DF	(Russia)	Ilya Gultyayev	Tambov	Undisclosed	
24 December 2018	FW	(Armenia)	Vardan Pogosyan	Gandzasar Kapan	Undisclosed	
16 January 2019	DF	(Armenia)	Robert Darbinyan	Ararat-Armenia	Undisclosed	
6 February 2019	DF	(Armenia)	Andranik Voskanyan	Alashkert	Undisclosed	
21 February 2019	FW	(Bosnia and Herzegovina)	Aleksandar Glišić	Radnik Bijeljina	Undisclosed	
23 February 2019	FW	(Moldova)	Ilie Damașcan	Zimbru Chișinău	Undisclosed	
26 February 2019	FW	(Russia)	Yevgeni Kobzar	Spartaks Jūrmala	Undisclosed	
28 February 2019	MF	(Belgium)	Welat Cagro	KAA Gent	Undisclosed	

=== Loans in ===
Date from	Position	Nationality	Name	From	Date to	Ref.
8 September 2017	MF	(Brazil)	Wal	Colorado	25 January 2019	
28 June 2018	MF	(Russia)	Albert Arzumanyan	Armavir	End of season	
2 July 2018	GK	(Russia)	Grigori Matevosyan	Armavir	End of season	
20 July 2018	MF	(Russia)	Mikhail Solovyov	Armavir	31 December 2018	
5 February 2019	DF	(Russia)	Albert Gadzhibekov	Armavir	End of season	

=== Out ===
Date	Position	Nationality	Name	To	Fee	Ref.
10 August 2018	MF	(Ghana)	Kwasi Sibo	Watford	Undisclosed	
1 February 2019	DF	(Armenia)	Erik Gharibyan	Ararat-Armenia	Undisclosed	

=== Released ===
Date	Position	Nationality	Name	Joined	Date
26 July 2018	MF	(Serbia)	Ognjen Krasić	Proleter Novi Sad	13 August 2018
30 July 2018	FW	(Trinidad and Tobago)	Lester Peltier	Alashkert	30 July 2018
22 December 2018	MF	(Armenia)	Aram Loretsyan	Junior Sevan	
31 December 2018	DF	(Armenia)	Gevorg Khuloyan		
31 December 2018	DF	(Ukraine)	Dmytro Khovbosha	Veres Rivne	27 March 2019
31 December 2018	FW	(Brazil)	Fagner Santos		
31 December 2018	FW	(Brazil)	Guilerme Torres		
6 February 2019	DF	(Russia)	Ilya Gultyayev	Gomel	14 February 2019
1 June 2019	FW	(Ghana)	Nathaniel Asamoah		
1 June 2019	FW	(Moldova)	Ilie Damașcan	Petrocub Hîncești	
13 June 2019	DF	(Armenia)	Artur Avagyan	Lori	28 June 2019
23 June 2019	FW	(Armenia)	Vardan Pogosyan	Alashkert	5 July 2019
30 June 2019	GK	(Armenia)	Stepan Ghazaryan	Retired	
30 June 2019	DF	(Armenia)	Narek Grigoryan	BKMA Yerevan	
30 June 2019	DF	(Armenia)	Hakob Hambardzumyan	Gandzasar Kapan	
30 June 2019	DF	(Serbia)	Borislav Jovanović		
30 June 2019	MF	(Belgium)	Welat Cagro	Telstar	31 January 2020

== Competitions ==
=== Armenian Premier League ===
==== Results ====
4 August 2018 1	Banants	0 – 0	Shirak	Yerevan
17:00 (UTC+4)	Jovanović (yellow card) 16'; H. Hakobyan (yellow card) 57'; V.Ayvazyan (yellow card) 66'; Asamoah 86'	Report	K.Veranyan (yellow card) 85'; R.Mkrtchyan (yellow card) 90+2'	Stadium: Banants Stadium; Attendance: 500; Referee: Artur Simonyan

11 August 2018 2	Artsakh	1 – 0	Banants	Yerevan
17:00 (UTC+4)	Yermakov (yellow card) 30'; G.Aghekyan 54'	Report	V.Ayvazyan (yellow card) 33'	Stadium: Mika Stadium; Attendance: 500; Referee: Suren Baliyan

22 August 2018 3	Banants	1 – 3	Lori	Yerevan
16:30 (UTC+4)	Kpodo (yellow card) 4'; Solovyov 74'	Report	I.Fuseni (yellow card) 40'; Désiré 61'; I.Aliyu 68'; U.Iwu 86' (pen.)	Stadium: Banants Stadium; Attendance: 500; Referee: Zaven Hovhannisyan

25 August 2018 4	Ararat Yerevan	2 – 4	Banants	Yerevan
16:00 (UTC+4)	G.Poghosyan (yellow card) 46'; A.Kocharyan 51'; O.Hambardzumyan 80'	Report	Asamoah 11' (yellow card) 54'; V.Ayvazyan 22', 44'; Kpodo 58'	Stadium: Alashkert Stadium; Attendance: 300; Referee: Gevorg Eghoyan

29 August 2018 5	Banants	4 – 2	Pyunik	Yerevan
16:00 (UTC+4)	Stezhko 46' (o.g.); A.Bareghamyan (yellow card) 65'; Stanojević 71'; V.Ayvazyan 79'; Wal 83'	Report	Konaté 27'; R.Hakobyan (yellow card) 44'; Vardanyan 66' (pen.); A.Kartashyan (yellow card) 82'; Hovsepyan (yellow card) 85'; A.Manucharyan (yellow card) 90+3'	Stadium: Banants Stadium; Attendance: 600; Referee: Artur Simonyan

1 September 2018 6	Banants	1 – 0	Gandzasar Kapan	Yerevan
16:00 (UTC+4)	Jovanović (yellow card) 31'; A.Bareghamyan 33'; N.Petrosyan (yellow card) 63'	Report		Stadium: Banants Stadium; Attendance: 500; Referee: Suren Baliyan

16 September 2018 7	Banants	1 – 0	Alashkert	Yerevan
16:00 (UTC+4)	Udo (yellow card) 49'; Abdullahi 68'; Ayrapetyan (yellow card) 82'	Report	Stojković (yellow card) 80'	Stadium: Banants Stadium; Attendance: 600; Referee: Artur Simonyan

23 September 2018 8	Ararat-Armenia	1 – 3	Banants	Yerevan
17:00 (UTC+4)	Darbinyan (yellow card) 27'; Monsalvo 84'; Malakyan (yellow card) 87'; Rose (yellow card) 89'	Report	V.Ayvazyan 9' (yellow card) 85'; Gultyayev (yellow card) 29'; Stanojević 32' (yellow card) 85'; E.Petrosyan 90+3'; A.Bareghamyan (yellow card) 90+5'	Stadium: Yerevan Football Academy Stadium; Attendance: 500; Referee: Artur Safaryan

29 September 2018 9	Shirak	0 – 0	Banants	Gyumri
14:00 (UTC+4)		Report	V.Ayvazyan (yellow card) 19'; H. Hakobyan (yellow card) 41'; Jovanović (red card) 85'	Stadium: Gyumri City Stadium; Attendance: 600; Referee: Zaven Hovhannisyan

7 October 2018 10	Banants	2 – 1	Artsakh	Yerevan
14:00 (UTC+4)	Stanojević (yellow card) 44' (goal) 49'; Kpodo (yellow card) 90'; Udo 90+2'	Report	O.Tupchiyenko (yellow card) 34'; H.Poghosyan (yellow card) 35'; A.Petrosyan (yellow card) 64'; Minasyan (yellow card) 75'	Stadium: Banants Stadium; Attendance: 500; Referee: Henrik Nalbandyan

28 October 2018 11	Lori	1 – 3	Banants	Vanadzor
15:00 (UTC+4)	V.Avetisyan 2'; U.Iwu (yellow card) 74'; N.Antwi (yellow card) 76'; G.Elyazyan (yellow card) 83'	Report	Gultyayev (yellow card) 3'; Udo (yellow card) 31'; Wal 58', 71' (pen.); A.Avagyan (yellow card) 82'; Abdullahi (yellow card) 90'; A.Bareghamyan 90+2'	Stadium: Vanadzor Football Academy; Attendance: 700; Referee: Suren Baliyan

31 October 2018 12	Ararat Yerevan	0 – 2	Banants	Yerevan
15:00 (UTC+4)		Report	Asamoah 12'; Stanojević (yellow card) 66'	Stadium: Alashkert Stadium; Attendance: 150; Referee: Artur Simonyan

4 November 2018 14	Pyunik	2 – 0	Banants	Yerevan
14:00 (UTC+4)	A.Arakelyan 7', 84'	Report	V.Ayvazyan (yellow card) 49'	Stadium: Vazgen Sargsyan Republican Stadium; Attendance: 700; Referee: Gevorg Eghoyan

11 November 2018 15	Gandzasar Kapan	3 – 0	Banants	Yerevan
15:00 (UTC+4)	Wbeymar 16'; Musonda 21'; G.Ohanyan (yellow card) 42'; V.Pogosyan (yellow card) 45+1'; Junior 66' (pen.) (yellow card) 69'; G.Nranyan (yellow card) 69'	Report	Gultyayev (yellow card) 13'; Udo (yellow card) 69'; Camara (yellow card) 69'; V.Ayvazyan (yellow card) 84'	Stadium: Yerevan Football Academy Stadium; Attendance: 100; Referee: Artur Safaryan

24 November 2018 15	Alashkert	1 – 0	Banants	Yerevan
14:30 (UTC+4)	Nenadović 2' (yellow card) 70'; Grigoryan (yellow card) 37'; Mkoyan (yellow card) 69'; S.Shahinyan (yellow card) 84'; Čančarević (yellow card) 90+2'	Report	A.Avagyan (yellow card) 27'; Wal (yellow card) 87'; Asamoah (yellow card) 90+2'	Stadium: Alashkert Stadium; Attendance: 150; Referee: Artur Simonyan

28 November 2018 16	Banants	0 – 3	Ararat-Armenia	Yerevan
14:00 (UTC+4)	Jovanović (yellow card) 32'	Report	Kobyalko 25'; Khozin 33'; Kayron 90'	Stadium: Banants-4 Stadium; Attendance: 170; Referee: Zaven Hovhannisyan

1 December 2018 17	Banants	4 – 0	Shirak	Yerevan
14:00 (UTC+4)	Wal 12', 74'; Jovanović (yellow card) 26'; Udo 60'; Solovyov (yellow card) 78'; A.Amiryan 89' (o.g.)	Report		Stadium: Banants-4 Stadium; Attendance: 100; Referee: Suren Baliyan

3 March 2018 18	Artsakh	1 – 1	Banants	Yerevan
14:00 (UTC+4)	D.Klimakov (yellow card) 9' (goal) 19'; K.Harutyunyan (yellow card) 16'; H.Hambardzumyan (yellow card) 57'; Gareginyan (yellow card) 82'	Report	A.Avagyan (yellow card) 10'; Glišić 35' (yellow card) 66'; Gadzhibekov (yellow card) 46'; Darbinyan (yellow card) 52'; Udo (yellow card) 56'	Stadium: Pyunik Training Centre; Attendance: 600; Referee: Geovorg Eghoyan

11 March 2019 19	Banants	0 – 0	Lori	Yerevan
14:00 (UTC+4)	Gadzhibekov (yellow card) 60'; H. Hakobyan (yellow card) 68'; Voskanyan (yellow card) 69'	Report		Stadium: Banants Stadium; Attendance: 200; Referee: Zaven Hovhannisyan

17 March 2019 20	Banants	3 – 1	Ararat Yerevan	Yerevan
14:00 (UTC+4)	Kobzar 23'; K.Melkonyan 31' (yellow card) 69'; H. Hakobyan (yellow card) 50'; Darbinyan (yellow card) 77'; Udo (yellow card) 79'; Glišić 88'	Report	R.Safaryan (yellow card) 14'; Simonyan 49'; G.Poghosyan (yellow card) 56'; S.Metoyan (yellow card) 79'; S.Shahinyan (yellow card) 90+3'	Stadium: Banants Stadium; Attendance: 250; Referee: Henrik Nalbandyan

31 March 2019 21	Banants	1 – 1	Pyunik	Yerevan
14:00 (UTC+4)	V.Ayvazyan 2'; W.Cagro (yellow card) 54'; Gadzhibekov (yellow card) 90+4'	Report	Talalay (yellow card) 49'; Marku (yellow card) 64'; Hovsepyan 90+2'	Stadium: Banants Stadium; Attendance: 300; Referee: Gevorg Eghoyan

6 April 2019 22	Gandzasar Kapan	1 – 2	Banants	Yerevan
14:00 (UTC+4)	Chula (yellow card) 77' (yellow-red card) 90'; Al.Hovhannisyan 86'	Report	Gadzhibekov (yellow card) 45+1'; Kpodo 55'; Darbinyan (yellow card) 73'; Camara 90+3'	Stadium: Yerevan Football Academy Stadium; Attendance: 200; Referee: Zaven Hovhannisyan

10 April 2019 23	Banants	2 – 0	Alashkert	Yerevan
15:00 (UTC+4)	A.Bareghamyan 61' (pen.); K.Melkonyan 69' (yellow card) 74'; V.Ayvazyan (yellow card) 82'; Udo (yellow card) 89'	Report	Artu.Yedigaryan (yellow card) 45+3' (yellow-red card) 65'; T.Voskanyan (yellow card) 59'; Stojković (yellow card) 59'; Manucharyan (yellow card) 89'	Stadium: Banants Stadium; Attendance: 200; Referee: Suren Baliyan

15 April 2019 24	Ararat-Armenia	1 – 1	Banants	Yerevan
15:00 (UTC+4)	Malakyan (yellow card) 54'; Pashov 90+1'	Report	Gadzhibekov 45+1'; Darbinyan (yellow card) 48'; Kpodo (yellow card) 66'	Stadium: Yerevan Football Academy Stadium; Attendance: 400; Referee: Artur Simonyan

19 April 2019 25	Shirak	0 – 0	Banants	Gyumri
16:00 (UTC+4)	Mikaelyan (yellow card) 19'; Z.Margaryan (yellow card) 67'; A.Davoyan (yellow card) 90+2'	Report	N.Petrosyan (yellow card) 78'	Stadium: Gyumri Football Academy; Attendance: 100; Referee: Zaven Hovhannisyan

27 April 2019 26	Banants	3 – 0	Artsakh	Yerevan
19:30 (UTC+4)	Kpodo 24'; Glišić 57'; Kobzar 66'	Report	A.Petrosyan (yellow card) 45'	Stadium: Banants Stadium; Attendance: 4,000; Referee: Artur Safaryan

4 May 2019 27	Lori	1 – 3	Banants	Vanadzor
16:00 (UTC+4)	I.Aliyu (yellow card) 43'; W.Nwani 80'	Report	A.Bareghamyan 22'; Darbinyan (yellow card) 40'; K.Melkonyan 77'; Glišić 90+3'	Stadium: Vanadzor Football Academy; Attendance: 600; Referee: Zaven Hovhannisyan

10 May 2019 28	Banants	1 – 1	Ararat Yerevan	Yerevan
19:30 (UTC+4)	Glišić 15' (yellow card) 36'; V.Ayvazyan (yellow card) 73'; Ayrapetyan (yellow card) 90+4'	Report	A.Kocharyan 31'; Yakovlev (yellow card) 62'; M.Guyganov (yellow card) 90+6'	Stadium: Banants Stadium; Attendance: 300; Referee: Artur Simonyan

15 May 2019 29	Pyunik	1 – 1	Banants	Yerevan
17:00 (UTC+4)	Marku (yellow card) 22'; Miranyan 47'; Grigoryan (yellow card) 87'; Mkrtchyan (yellow card) 90'	Report	Darbinyan (yellow card) 26' (yellow-red card) 86'; K.Melkonyan (yellow card) 45' (goal) 55'; Kpodo (yellow card) 88'	Stadium: Yerevan Football Academy Stadium; Attendance: 300; Referee: Zaven Hovhannisyan

18 May 2019 30	Banants	0 – 5	Gandzasar Kapan	Yerevan
19:30 (UTC+4)	Udo (yellow card) 86' (yellow-red card) 86'	Report	G.Nranyan 5'; Baldé 11', 24'; H.Asoyan (yellow card) 14'; G.Ohanyan 35'; Ar.Hovhannisyan (yellow card) 59'; Harutyunyan 90+2'	Stadium: Banants Stadium; Attendance: 700; Referee: Suren Baliyan

24 May 2019 31	Alashkert	1 – 1	Banants	Yerevan
17:00 (UTC+4)	Manucharyan 39'; Grigoryan (yellow card) 53'; T.Voskanyan (yellow card) 69'; Daghbashyan (yellow card) 87'	Report	N.Petrosyan (yellow card) 15'; Kobzar (yellow card) 48'; Pogosyan 90+2'	Stadium: Alashkert Stadium; Attendance: 400; Referee: Zaven Hovhannisyan

30 May 2019 32	Banants	0 – 1	Ararat-Armenia	Yerevan
17:00 (UTC+4)	A.Bareghamyan (yellow card) 45+2'; Camara (yellow card) 67'; V.Ayvazyan (yellow card) 75'	Report	Kobyalko 52' (pen.); Kódjo (yellow card) 67'	Stadium: Banants Stadium; Attendance: 3,000; Referee: Krzysztof Jakubik

==== Table ====
Pos	Team	Pld	W	D	L	GF	GA	GD	Pts	Qualification or relegation
1	Ararat-Armenia (C)	32	18	7	7	53	28	+25	61	Qualification for the Champions League first qualifying round
2	Pyunik	32	18	6	8	46	32	+14	60	Qualification for the Europa League first qualifying round (Note: Alashkert qualified for the Europa League first qualifying round by winning the 2018–19 Armenian Cup.)
3	Banants	32	14	10	8	43	35	+8	52	Qualification for the Europa League first qualifying round
4	Alashkert	32	15	6	11	37	27	+10	51	Qualification for the Europa League first qualifying round
5	Lori	32	11	11	10	42	40	+2	44	
6	Gandzasar	32	10	8	14	38	33	+5	38	
7	Shirak	32	7	15	10	26	30	−4	36	
8	Artsakh	32	6	10	16	25	49	−24	28	
9	Ararat Yerevan	32	5	7	20	24	60	−36	22	

Source: Soccerway
Rules for classification: 1) Points; 2) Play-off (only if deciding champion); 3) Matches won; 4) Head-to-head points; 5) Head-to-head matches won; 6) Head-to-head goal difference; 7) Head-to-head goals scored; 8) Head-to-head away goals scored; 9) Goal difference; 10) Goals scored.
(C) Champions

=== Armenian Cup ===
24 October 2018 Second Round 1st leg	Banants	3 – 1	Ararat Yerevan	Yerevan
15:00 (UTC+4)	Abdullahi 16', 90+4'; A.Loretsyan (yellow card) 25' (goal) 28'; Kpodo (yellow card) 22' (yellow-red card) 60'; Solovyov (yellow card) 88'	Report	V.Chopuryan (yellow card) 54'; G.Kirakosyan (yellow card) 74'; P.Dieye 79'	Stadium: Banants Stadium; Attendance: 150; Referee: Henrik Nalbandyan

8 November 2018 Second Round 2nd leg	Ararat Yerevan	0 – 1 (1 – 4 agg.)	Banants	Yerevan
14:00 (UTC+4)	G.Poghosyan (yellow card) 3'; V.Chopuryan (red card) 89'	Report	E.Petrosyan 50'	Stadium: Alashkert Stadium; Attendance: 150; Referee: Artur Simonyan

3 April 2019 Semifinal 1st leg	Banants	0 – 0	Lori	Yerevan
14:00 (UTC+4)	Camara (yellow card) 65'	Report	I.Aliyu (yellow card) 45'	Stadium: Banants Stadium; Attendance: 150; Referee: Artak Simonyan

22 April 2019 Semifinal 2nd leg	Lori	3 – 0 W/O (3 – 0 agg.)	Banants	Vanadzor
16:00 (UTC+4)		Report		Stadium: Vanadzor Football Academy; Referee: Gevorg Eghoyan
Note: Banants owner, Jevan Cheloian, removed his team from the pitch prior to kick-off in protest of the appointment of Gevorg Eghoyan as referee.

=== UEFA Europa League ===
==== Qualifying rounds ====
11 July 2018 First qualifying round 1st leg	Banants (Armenia)	1 – 2	(Bosnia and Herzegovina) Sarajevo	Yerevan, Armenia
17:30 (UTC+4)	Ayvazyan 34'; Sibo (yellow card) 64'; Santos (yellow card) 90+4'	Report	Ahmetović 16'; Halilović 21'; Mujakić (yellow card) 33'	Stadium: Banants Stadium; Attendance: 3,000; Referee: Rohit Saggi (Norway)

19 July 2018 First qualifying round 2nd leg	Sarajevo (Bosnia and Herzegovina)	3 – 0 (5 – 1 agg.)	(Armenia) Banants	Sarajevo, Bosnia and Herzegovina
22:00 (UTC+4)	Mujakić 31'; Ahmetović 38'; Mustafić (yellow card) 51'; Resić 72'	Report	Sibo (yellow card) 12'; Stanojević (yellow card) 45+2'	Stadium: Asim Ferhatović Hase Stadium; Attendance: 8,125; Referee: Lionel Tschudi (Switzerland)

== Statistics ==
As of match played 30 May 2019

=== Appearances and goals ===
No.	Pos	Nat	Player	Total		Premier League		Armenian Cup		UEFA Europa League	
No.	Pos	Nat	Player	Apps	Goals	Apps	Goals	Apps	Goals	Apps	Goals
1	GK	(Armenia) ARM	Anatoliy Ayvazov	9	0	5	0	3	0	1	0
3	DF	(Russia) RUS	Albert Gadzhibekov	15	1	14	1	1	0	0	0
4	DF	(Armenia) ARM	Andranik Voskanyan	5	0	3+2	0	0	0	0	0
5	MF	(Armenia) ARM	Hakob Hakobyan	27	0	23+2	0	1+1	0	0	0
6	DF	(Serbia) SRB	Borislav Jovanović	13	0	11	0	0	0	2	0
7	MF	(Armenia) ARM	Aram Bareghamyan	35	4	29+1	4	1+2	0	2	0
8	FW	(Armenia) ARM	Vardan Pogosyan	2	1	0+2	1	0	0	0	0
9	FW	(Russia) RUS	Yevgeni Kobzar	13	2	11+1	2	1	0	0	0
10	MF	(Armenia) ARM	Karen Melkonyan	26	4	14+8	4	1+1	0	0+2	0
13	DF	(Ghana) GHA	Edward Kpodo	32	3	27	3	3	0	2	0
14	MF	(Nigeria) NGR	Adamu Abdullahi	20	3	4+13	1	2+1	2	0	0
15	FW	(Ghana) GHA	Nathaniel Asamoah	19	2	13+4	2	2	0	0	0
16	MF	(Senegal) SEN	Pape Camara	25	1	10+12	1	2+1	0	0	0
17	FW	(Moldova) MDA	Ilie Damașcan	11	0	8+3	0	0	0	0	0
18	MF	(Armenia) ARM	Vahagn Ayvazyan	32	6	25+2	5	3	0	2	1
19	MF	(Belgium) BEL	Welat Cagro	10	0	4+6	0	0	0	0	0
20	MF	(Serbia) SRB	Igor Stanojević	26	3	15+7	3	1+1	0	2	0
21	DF	(Armenia) ARM	Artur Avagyan	12	0	9+2	0	1	0	0	0
22	GK	(Armenia) ARM	Stepan Ghazaryan	2	0	2	0	0	0	0	0
23	DF	(Armenia) ARM	Narek Petrosyan	27	0	20+3	0	2	0	2	0
25	MF	(Nigeria) NGR	Solomon Udo	32	2	28	2	2	0	2	0
26	MF	(Armenia) ARM	Narek Grigoryan	1	0	0+1	0	0	0	0	0
77	GK	(Armenia) ARM	Aram Ayrapetyan	26	0	25	0	0	0	1	0
78	FW	(Bosnia and Herzegovina) BIH	Aleksandar Glišić	13	5	13	5	0	0	0	0
99	DF	(Armenia) ARM	Robert Darbinyan	12	0	10+1	0	0+1	0	0	0
Banants-2 Players:
9	FW	(Armenia) ARM	Erik Petrosyan	9	2	3+5	1	1	1	0	0
Players who left Banants during the season:
8	MF	(Armenia) ARM	Aram Loretsyan	6	1	1+2	0	2	1	0+1	0
10	MF	(Serbia) SRB	Ognjen Krasić	2	0	0	0	0	0	1+1	0
11	FW	(Trinidad and Tobago) TTO	Lester Peltier	2	0	0	0	0	0	2	0
16	FW	(Brazil) BRA	Fagner Santos	1	0	0	0	0	0	0+1	0
19	MF	(Brazil) BRA	Wal	18	5	11+4	5	1	0	1+1	0
33	DF	(Russia) RUS	Ilya Gultyayev	11	0	8+1	0	2	0	0	0
78	MF	(Russia) RUS	Mikhail Solovyov	17	1	6+9	1	1+1	0	0	0
90	MF	(Ghana) GHA	Kwasi Sibo	2	0	0	0	0	0	2	0

=== Goal scorers ===
Place	Position	Nation	Number	Name	Premier League	Armenian Cup	UEFA Europa League	Total
1	MF	(Armenia)	18	Vahagn Ayvazyan	5	0	1	6
2	MF	(Brazil)	19	Wal	5	0	0	5
2	FW	(Bosnia and Herzegovina)	78	Aleksandar Glišić	5	0	0	5
4	MF	(Armenia)	7	Aram Bareghamyan	4	0	0	4
4	MF	(Armenia)	10	Karen Melkonyan	4	0	0	4
6	MF	(Serbia)	20	Igor Stanojević	3	0	0	3
6	DF	(Ghana)	13	Edward Kpodo	3	0	0	3
6	MF	(Nigeria)	14	Adamu Abdullahi	1	2	0	3
9	FW	(Ghana)	15	Nathaniel Asamoah	2	0	0	2
9	MF	(Nigeria)	25	Solomon Udo	2	0	0	2
9	FW	(Russia)	9	Yevgeni Kobzar	2	0	0	2
9	FW	(Armenia)	9	Erik Petrosyan	1	1	0	2
9				Own goal	2	0	0	2
14	MF	(Russia)	78	Mikhail Solovyov	1	0	0	1
14	MF	(Senegal)	16	Pape Camara	1	0	0	1
14	DF	(Russia)	3	Albert Gadzhibekov	1	0	0	1
14	FW	(Armenia)	8	Vardan Pogosyan	1	0	0	1
14	MF	(Armenia)	8	Aram Loretsyan	0	1	0	1
				TOTALS	43	4	1	48

=== Clean sheets ===
Place	Position	Nation	Number	Name	Premier League	Armenian Cup	UEFA Europa League	Total
1	GK	(Armenia)	77	Aram Ayrapetyan	7	0	0	7
2	GK	(Armenia)	1	Anatoliy Ayvazov	2	2	0	4
3	GK	(Armenia)	22	Stepan Ghazaryan	1	0	0	1
				TOTALS	10	2	0	12

=== Disciplinary record ===
Number	Nation	Position	Name	Premier League		Armenian Cup		UEFA Europa League		Total	
Number	Nation	Position	Name	Yellow card	Red card	Yellow card	Red card	Yellow card	Red card	Yellow card	Red card
3	(Russia)	DF	Albert Gadzhibekov	4	0	0	0	0	0	4	0
4	(Armenia)	DF	Andranik Voskanyan	1	0	0	0	0	0	1	0
5	(Armenia)	MF	Hakob Hakobyan	4	0	0	0	0	0	4	0
6	(Serbia)	DF	Borislav Jovanović	4	1	0	0	0	0	4	1
7	(Armenia)	MF	Aram Bareghamyan	3	0	0	0	0	0	3	0
9	(Russia)	FW	Yevgeni Kobzar	1	0	0	0	0	0	1	0
10	(Armenia)	MF	Karen Melkonyan	3	0	0	0	0	0	3	0
13	(Ghana)	DF	Edward Kpodo	4	0	2	1	0	0	6	1
14	(Nigeria)	MF	Adamu Abdullahi	1	0	0	0	0	0	1	0
15	(Ghana)	FW	Nathaniel Asamoah	3	0	0	0	0	0	3	0
16	(Senegal)	MF	Pape Camara	2	0	1	0	0	0	3	0
18	(Armenia)	MF	Vahagn Ayvazyan	9	0	0	0	0	0	9	0
19	(Belgium)	MF	Welat Cagro	1	0	0	0	0	0	1	0
20	(Serbia)	MF	Igor Stanojević	3	0	0	0	1	0	4	0
21	(Armenia)	DF	Artur Avagyan	3	0	0	0	0	0	3	0
23	(Armenia)	DF	Narek Petrosyan	3	0	0	0	0	0	3	0
25	(Nigeria)	MF	Solomon Udo	8	1	0	0	0	0	8	1
77	(Armenia)	GK	Aram Ayrapetyan	2	0	0	0	0	0	2	0
78	(Bosnia and Herzegovina)	FW	Aleksandar Glišić	2	0	0	0	0	0	2	0
99	(Armenia)	DF	Robert Darbinyan	7	1	0	0	0	0	7	1
Players who left Banants during the season:
8	(Armenia)	MF	Aram Loretsyan	0	0	1	0	0	0	1	0
16	(Brazil)	FW	Fagner Santos	0	0	0	0	1	0	1	0
19	(Brazil)	MF	Wal	1	0	0	0	0	0	1	0
33	(Russia)	DF	Ilya Gultyayev	3	0	0	0	0	0	3	0
78	(Russia)	MF	Mikhail Solovyov	1	0	1	0	0	0	2	0
90	(Ghana)	MF	Kwasi Sibo	0	0	0	0	2	0	2	0
			TOTALS	73	3	5	1	4	0	82	4
