= 2017–18 Armenian Cup =

Tournament details
- Country: Armenia
- Teams: 8

Final positions
- Champions: Gandzasar Kapan
- Runners-up: Alashkert

Tournament statistics
- Matches played: 13
- Goals scored: 34 (2.62 per match)

The 2017–18 Armenian Cup was the 27th season of the football knockout competition in Armenia. The winners of the cup this season earned a place in the 2018–19 Europa League and would begin play in the first qualifying round. Shirak won the cup final in the previous season and were the defending champions.

The tournament began on 13 September 2017 with the quarter-final round, which was contested by the six Premier League clubs and two clubs from the First League.

== Format ==
The Armenian Football Cup this season was contested over three rounds. The quarter-final and semi-final rounds were played over two legs, and the final was a single match to determine the cup winner.

== Quarter–finals ==
21 September 2017 1st leg	Artsakh	1–3	Alashkert	Yerevan
16:00 (UTC+4)	Aghekyan 9'	Report	M. Manasyan 27', 62'; Artur Yedigaryan 73' (pen.)	Stadium: Mika Stadium; Attendance: 200; Referee: Shahen Aghayan

19 October 2017 2nd leg	Alashkert	6–0 (9–1 agg.)	Artsakh	Yerevan
15:00 (UTC+4)	M. Jablan 25'; Artak Yedigaryan 66'; Artur Yedigaryan 69', 76', 80'; A. Dashyan 90+1'	Report		Stadium: Alashkert Stadium; Attendance: 100

14 September 2017 1st leg	Gandzasar Kapan	3–0	Ararat-Moskva	Yerevan
19:00 (UTC+4)	S. Shahinyan 62'; Alex Junior 78'; G. Nranyan 87'	Report		Stadium: Vazgen Sargsyan Republican Stadium; Attendance: 200; Referee: Henrik Nalbandyan

11 October 2017 2nd leg	Ararat-Moskva	0–4 (0–7 agg.)	Gandzasar Kapan	Yerevan
15:00 (UTC+4)		Report	G.Nranyan 1', 55'; A. Adamyan 44'; D. Yashin 74'	Stadium: Yerevan Football Academy Stadium; Attendance: 200; Referee: Ashot Ghaltakchyan

13 September 2017 1st leg	Shirak	1–1	Ararat Yerevan	Gyumri
15:00 (UTC+4)	M. Bakayoko 12'	Report	R. Safaryan 61'	Stadium: Gyumri City Stadium; Attendance: 100; Referee: Gevorg Yeghoyan

25 October 2017 2nd leg	Ararat Yerevan	0–2 (1–3 agg.)	Shirak	Yerevan
15:00 (UTC+4)		Report	V. Bakalyan 65'; M. Bakayoko 69'	Stadium: Alashkert Stadium; Attendance: 20; Referee: Artur Simonyan

20 September 2017 1st leg	Pyunik	0–0	Banants	Yerevan
18:00 (UTC+4)		Report		Stadium: Vazgen Sargsyan Republican Stadium; Attendance: 300; Referee: Gevorg Yeghoyan

25 October 2017 2nd leg	Banants	4–2 (4–2 agg.)	Pyunik	Yerevan
15:00 (UTC+4)	N. Injac 8', 24'; R. Hovsepyan 44'; O. Krasić 86'	Report	P. Avetisyan 40' (pen.), 89'	Stadium: Banants Stadium; Attendance: 300; Referee: Zaven Hovhannisyan

== Semi–finals ==
8 March 2018 1st leg	Banants	0–1	Alashkert	Yerevan
15:00 (UTC+4)		Report	A. Dashyan 58'	Stadium: Banants Stadium; Attendance: 1,000; Referee: Artak Simonyan

17 April 2018 2nd leg	Alashkert	1–0 (2–0 agg.)	Banants	Yerevan
16:00 (UTC+4)	Artak Yedigaryan 40'	Report		Stadium: Alashkert Stadium; Attendance: 250

7 March 2018 1st leg	Gandzasar Kapan	1–1	Shirak	Gyumri
14:00 (UTC+4)	A. Khachatryan 24'	Report	M. Bakayoko 42'	Stadium: Gyumri City Stadium; Attendance: 300

18 April 2018 2nd leg	Shirak	0–1 (1–2 agg.)	Gandzasar Kapan	Yerevan
(UTC+4)		Report	Musonda 18'	Stadium: Alashkert Stadium; Attendance: 200; Referee: Suren Baliyan

== Final ==
16 May 2018
19:00 (UTC+4)

Gandzasar Kapan	1–1 (a.e.t.)	Alashkert
Musonda 116'	Report	M. Manasyan 106'
Penalties
(penalty missed); Junior (penalty scored); A.Khachatryan (penalty scored); Musonda (penalty scored); G.Harutyunyan (penalty scored)	4 – 3	(penalty scored) Nenadović; (penalty scored) Arta.Yedigaryan; (penalty scored) Daghbashyan (penalty missed) (penalty missed)

Vazgen Sargsyan Republican Stadium, Yerevan

== Scorers ==
As of match played 16 May 2018

4 goals:

- (Armenia) Artur Yedigaryan - Alashkert

3 goals:

- (Armenia) Mihran Manasyan - Alashkert
- (Armenia) Gevorg Nranyan - Gandzasar Kapan
- (Ivory Coast) Moussa Paul Bakayoko - Shirak

2 goals:

- (Armenia) Artak Dashyan - Alashkert
- (Armenia) Artak Yedigaryan - Alashkert
- (Serbia) Nenad Injac - Banants
- (Zambia) Lubambo Musonda - Gandzasar Kapan
- (Armenia) Petros Avetisyan - Pyunik

1 goals:

- (Armenia) Rafael Safaryan - Ararat Yerevan
- (Armenia) Grigor Aghekyan - Artsakh
- (Armenia) Rumyan Hovsepyan - Banants
- (Serbia) Ognjen Krasić - Banants
- (Serbia) Miljan Jablan - Alashkert
- (Armenia) Ara Khachatryan - Gandzasar Kapan
- (Armenia) Sargis Shahinyan - Gandzasar Kapan
- (Haiti) Alex Junior Christian - Gandzasar Kapan
- (Russia) Artur Adamyan - Gandzasar Kapan
- (Russia) Dmitri Yashin - Gandzasar Kapan
- (Armenia) Vardan Bakalyan - Shirak

== See also ==
- 2017–18 Armenian Premier League
