= 2017–18 Armenian Premier League =

Armenian Premier League
- Season: 2017–18
- Dates: 4 August 2017 – 20 May 2018
- Champions: Alashkert
- Champions League: Alashkert
- Europa League: Banants; Gandzasar Kapan; Pyunik
- Matches: 89
- Goals: 233 (2.62 per match)
- Biggest home win: Alashkert 5–1 Pyunik (25 August 2017); Pyunik 4–0 Ararat (29 November 2017)
- Biggest away win: Ararat 1–6 Gandzasar (1 May 2018)
- Highest scoring: Ararat 4–4 Shirak (12 May 2018)
- Longest winning run: Shirak (5 matches)
- Longest unbeaten run: Shirak, Gandzasar (12 matches)
- Longest winless run: Ararat (11 matches)
- Longest losing run: Pyunik (5 matches)
- Highest attendance: 1,200; Shirak 0–0 Gandzasar (9 May 2018)
- All statistics correct as of 20 May 2018.

The 2017–18 Armenian Premier League season was the 26th since its establishment. The season began in August 2017 and concluded in May 2018. Alashkert were the defending champions from the previous season.

== Teams ==
The same six teams from the previous season will also take part in this season's competition.

Locations of the 2017–18 Armenian Premier League teams

Club	Location	Stadium	Capacity
Alashkert	Yerevan (Shengavit)	Alashkert Stadium	6,850
Ararat	Yerevan (Shengavit); Yerevan (Shengavit); Yerevan (Malatia-Sebastia)	Mika Stadium (matchday 1 to 6); Alashkert Stadium (matchday 7 to 15); Banants Training Centre (matchday 16 & onwards)	7,250; 6,850; 600
Banants	Yerevan (Malatia-Sebastia)	Banants Stadium	4,860
Gandzasar	Yerevan (Kentron)	Vazgen Sargsyan Stadium (matchday 1 to 15)^{1}	14,403
Pyunik	Yerevan (Kentron); Yerevan (Kentron)	Vazgen Sargsyan Stadium (matchday 1 to 15); Pyunik Stadium (matchday 16 & onwards)	14,403; 780
Shirak	Gyumri	Gyumri City Stadium	2,844

- ^{1}Gandzasar Kapan played the 1st half of the season at Vazgen Sargsyan Stadium in Yerevan, due to the rebuilding of their Gandzasar Stadium, Kapan, while they used other available Premier League stadiums during the 2nd half of the season.

=== Personnel and sponsorship ===
Team	President	Manager	Captain	Kit manufacturer	Shirt sponsor
Alashkert	(Armenia) Bagrat Navoyan	(Armenia) Abraham Khashmanyan (matchday 1 to 20) (Armenia) Varuzhan Sukiasyan (matchday 21 & onwards)	(Armenia) Vahagn Minasyan^{1} (Armenia) Artur Yedigaryan	Joma	Huawei
Ararat Yerevan	(Armenia) (Belgium) Hiraç Yagan	(Armenia) Albert Safaryan (matchday 1 to 23) (Armenia) Edgar Torosyan (matchday 24 & onwards)	(Armenia) Rafael Safaryan	Adidas	
Banants	(Armenia) Hrach Aghabekian	(Armenia) Artur Voskanyan	(Armenia) Stepan Ghazaryan	Adidas	
Gandzasar Kapan	(Armenia) Garnik Aghababian	(Armenia) Karen Barseghyan (matchday 1 to 19) (Armenia) Ashot Barseghyan (matchday 20 & onwards)	(Armenia) Ara Khachatryan	Adidas	ZCMC
Pyunik	(Armenia) (Russia) Artur Soghomonyan	(Russia) Aleksei Yeryomenko (matchday 1 to 11) (Armenia) Armen Gyulbudaghyants (matchday 12 & onwards)	(Armenia) Levon Hayrapetyan (Armenia) Karlen Mkrtchyan^{2}	Nike	Gold's Gym
Shirak	(Armenia) Arman Sahakyan	(Armenia) Vardan Bichakhchyan	(Armenia) Aghvan Davoyan	Adidas	TotoGaming

1. Left the team at the end of the 1st half of the season (after matchday 15).
2. Became captain after joining the club at the beginning of the 2nd half of the season (after matchday 15).

=== Season events ===
On 19 May 2018, the Football Federation of Armenia upheld its decision to deduct 12 points from Shirak, and fine the club Seven Million Drams, after it was alleged that Shirak's sporting director Ararat Harutyunyan had offered Edward Kpodo of FC Banants a bribe to fix their upcoming match.

== League table ==
Pos	Team	Pld	W	D	L	GF	GA	GD	Pts	Qualification
1	Alashkert (C)	30	14	8	8	44	31	+13	50	Qualification for the Champions League first qualifying round
2	Banants	30	11	11	8	42	34	+8	44	Qualification for the Europa League first qualifying round (Note: Gandzasar Kapan qualified for the Europa League first qualifying round by winning the 2017–18 Armenian Cup.)
3	Gandzasar Kapan	30	11	10	9	43	34	+9	43	Qualification for the Europa League first qualifying round
4	Shirak	30	14	8	8	37	31	+6	38 (Note: Shirak were deducted 12 points on decision of Disciplinary Committee, upheld on May 18, due to match fixing scandal.)	
5	Pyunik	30	9	9	12	37	41	−4	36	Qualification for the Europa League first qualifying round
6	Ararat Yerevan	30	5	6	19	33	65	−32	21	

Source: Soccerway
Rules for classification: 1) Points; 2) Play-off (only if deciding champion); 3) Matches won; 4) Head-to-head points; 5) Head-to-head matches won; 6) Head-to-head goal difference; 7) Head-to-head goals scored; 8) Head-to-head away goals scored; 9) Goal difference; 10) Goals scored.
(C) Champions

== Results ==
The six teams will play each other six times, three times at home and three times away, for a total of 30 matches per team played.

First part of season
Home \ Away	ALA	ARA	BAN	GAN	PYU	SHI
Alashkert	—	3–0	2–0	0–3	5–1	1–0
Ararat Yerevan	1–3	—	1–2	0–2	0–0	2–2
Banants	2–2	0–0	—	1–1	2–2	3–0
Gandzasar Kapan	1–1	1–3	2–0	—	3–1	0–1
Pyunik	0–1	4–0	1–2	2–1	—	0–2
Shirak	2–1	2–1	1–0	1–1	0–0	—

Legend: Blue = home team win; Yellow = draw; Red = away team win.

Second part of season
Home \ Away	ALA	ARA	BAN	GAN	PYU	SHI
Alashkert	—	2–0	2–2	0–1	1–0	0–1
Ararat Yerevan	2–3	—	2–3	1–0	0–1	0–2
Banants	2–2	2–0	—	1–1	1–1	3–0
Gandzasar Kapan	1–0	2–0	2–2	—	1–0	2–2
Pyunik	3–1	3–3	2–0	0–0	—	3–2
Shirak	0–1	0–1	0–1	2–1	2–0	—

Legend: Blue = home team win; Yellow = draw; Red = away team win.

Third part of season
Home \ Away	ALA	ARA	BAN	GAN	PYU	SHI
Alashkert	—	2–1	2–2	2–0	0–0	0–0
Ararat Yerevan	2–3	—	2–1	1–6	1–1	4–4
Banants	3–0	2–0	—	1–0	2–0	0–2
Gandzasar Kapan	0–4	3–1	1–1	—	4–3	1–1
Pyunik	0–0	1–3	2–1	2–1	—	1–2
Shirak	1–0	4–1	1–0	0–0	0–3	—

Legend: Blue = home team win; Yellow = draw; Red = away team win.

== Season statistics ==
=== Top scorers ===
As of match played 20 May 2018

Rank	Player	Club	Goals
1	(Armenia) Artak Yedigaryan	Alashkert	13
2	(Armenia) Gegham Harutyunyan	Gandzasar	12
3	(Armenia) Mihran Manasyan	Alashkert	9
3	(Armenia) Andranik Kocharyan	Ararat	9
5	(Haiti) Alex Junior Christian	Gandzasar	8
5	(Serbia) Uroš Nenadović	Alashkert	8
5	(Trinidad and Tobago) Lester Peltier	Banants	8
5	(Armenia) Rumyan Hovsepyan	Banants	8
9	(Zambia) Lubambo Musonda	Gandzasar	7
9	(Armenia) Alik Arakelyan	Pyunik	7
9	(Ivory Coast) Moussa Paul Bakayoko	Shirak	7
