= Albert Gadzhibekov =

Russian footballer

Personal information
- Full name: Albert Amrakhovich Gadzhibekov
- Date of birth: 17 February 1988 (age 38)
- Place of birth: Makhachkala, Russian SFSR
- Height: 1.85 m (6 ft 1 in)
- Position: Defender

Senior career*
Years	Team	Apps	(Gls)
2005	Anzhi-Khazar Makhachkala		
2006–2007	Anzhi Makhachkala	9	(0)
2008	Dynamo Stavropol	32	(0)
2009	Metallurg Lipetsk	20	(1)
2010	MITOS Novocherkassk	27	(5)
2011	Volga Tver	24	(0)
2012–2013	Dagdizel Kaspiysk	57	(12)
2014	Luch Vladivostok	1	(0)
2014	Dynamo St. Petersburg	17	(0)
2015–2016	Luch Vladivostok	25	(2)
2016–2019	Armavir	80	(10)
2019	→ Banants (loan)	14	(1)
- * Club domestic league appearances and goals

Albert Amrakhovich Gadzhibekov (Russian: Альберт Амрахович Гаджибеков; born 17 February 1988) is a Russian former professional football player of Lezgin descent.

== Career ==
=== Club ===
He made his Russian Football National League debut for FC Anzhi Makhachkala on 8 April 2006 in a game against FC Dynamo Makhachkala. He played 7 seasons in the FNL.

On 5 February 2019, Gadzhibekov joined FC Banants on loan until the end of the 2018–19 season.

== Personal life ==
He is the older brother of Ali Gadzhibekov.
