= Kwasi Sibo =

Ghanaian association football player

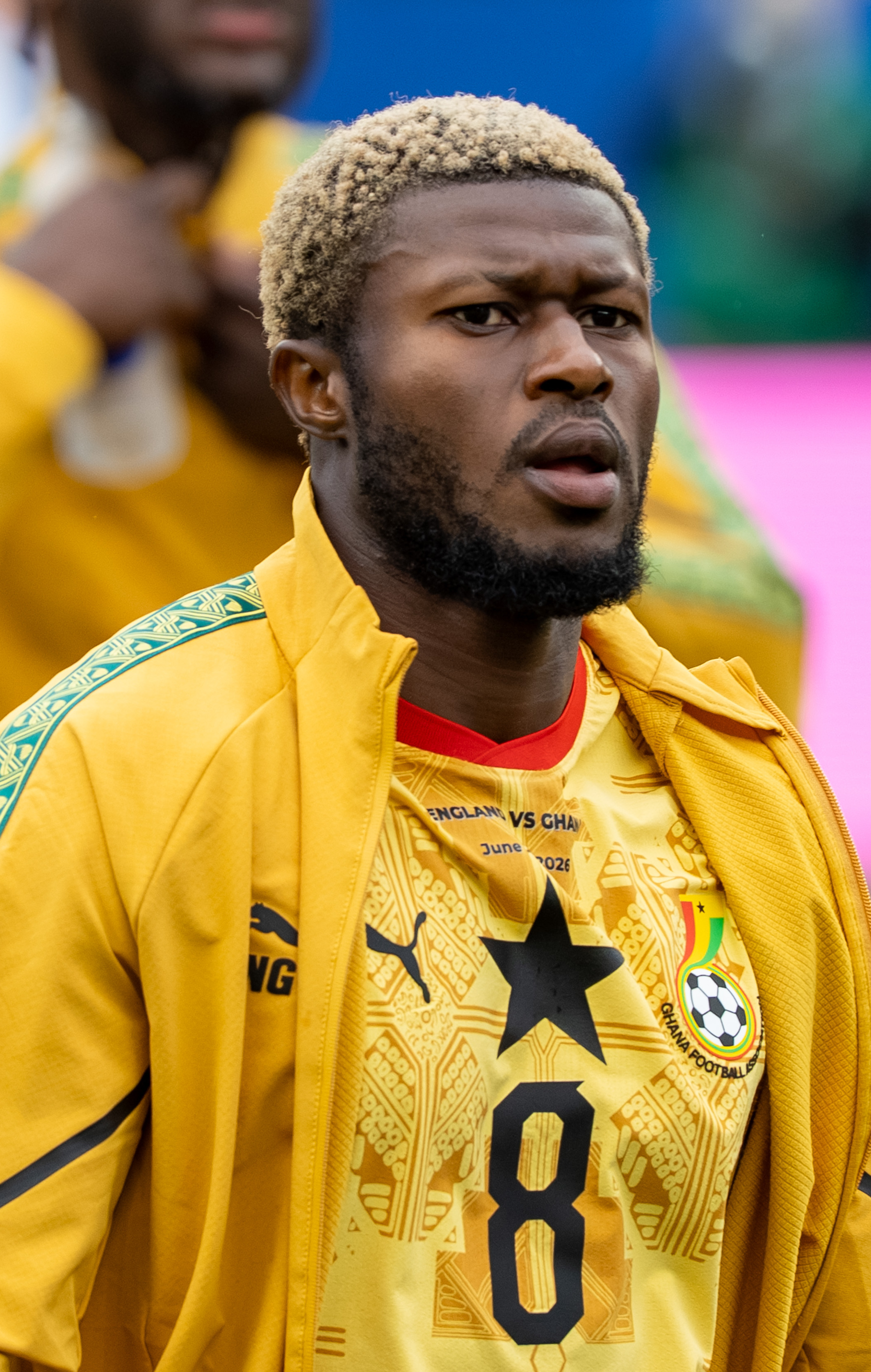
- Sibo with Ghana in 2026

Personal information
- Full name: Kwasi Sibo
- Date of birth: 24 June 1998 (age 28)
- Place of birth: Wa, Ghana
- Height: 1.82 m (6 ft 0 in)
- Position: Midfielder

Youth career
- –2017: Cheetah FC

Senior career*
Years	Team	Apps	(Gls)
2017–2018	Banants	20	(3)
2018–2021	Watford	0	(0)
2019	→ Skënderbeu Korçë (loan)	13	(1)
2019–2021	→ Ibiza (loan)	29	(1)
2021–2022	Betis B	32	(0)
2022–2024	Amorebieta	73	(2)
2024–2026	Oviedo	64	(1)

International career^{‡}
2025–	Ghana	12	(0)
- * Club domestic league appearances and goals as of 27 May 2026 ‡ National team caps and goals as of 11:20, 4 July 2026 (UTC)

Kwasi Sibo (born 24 June 1998) is a Ghanaian professional footballer who plays as a midfielder for the Ghana national team.

== Club career ==
Sibo began his career with Ghanaian side Cheetah FC before joining Armenian Premier League side Banants in September 2017. The following year, he signed for Premier League side Watford on a long-term deal.

In January 2019, Sibo joined Albanian Superliga side Skënderbeu Korçë on loan until the end of the season. The following season he spent some time training with Udinese before heading to Spain to join Ibiza on a season-long loan deal.

On 12 August 2020, it was announced Sibo would remain on loan at the Spanish side for another season. In August 2021, he signed permanently with Real Betis, being assigned to the reserves in Primera División RFEF.

On 5 September 2022, Sibo joined SD Amorebieta also in the third division. He helped in the club's promotion to Segunda División in his first season, but suffered relegation in his second.

On 4 July 2024, Sibo joined Real Oviedo in the second division on a two-year deal.

In August 2026, Sibo reached a preliminary agreement to join Turkish club Gençlerbirliği after leaving Real Oviedo as a free agent. The move would see him continue his career in the Turkish Süper Lig following two seasons in Spain.

== International career ==
On 2 June 2026, Sibo was named in head coach Carlos Queiroz's 26-man squad for the 2026 FIFA World Cup.

== Personal life ==
Sibo is the younger brother of fellow Ghanaian footballer Simon Zibo.

== Career statistics ==
=== Club ===
As of match played 8 March 2020

Appearances and goals by club, season and competition
Club	Season	League			National cup		League cup		Continental		Other		Total	
Club	Season	Division	Apps	Goals	Apps	Goals	Apps	Goals	Apps	Goals	Apps	Goals	Apps	Goals
Banants	2017–18	Armenian Premier League	20	3	4	0	-		-		-		24	3
Banants	2018–19	Armenian Premier League	0	0	0	0	-		2 (Note: Appearances in UEFA Europa League)	0	-		2	0
Banants	Total		20	3	4	0	-	-	2	0	-	-	26	3
Watford	2018–19	Premier League	0	0	0	0	0	0	-		-		0	0
Watford	2019–20	Premier League	0	0	0	0	0	0	-		-		0	0
Watford	Total		0	0	0	0	0	0	-	-	-	-	0	0
Skënderbeu Korçë (loan)	2018–19	Kategoria Superiore	13	1	3	0	-		—		—		16	1
Ibiza (loan)	2019–20	Segunda División B	13	1	3	0	-		—		—		16	1
Career total			46	5	10	0	0	0	2	0	-	-	58	5
