= Walmerson =

Brazilian footballer

Personal information
- Full name: Walmerson García Praia
- Date of birth: 13 January 1994 (age 32)
- Place of birth: Capanema, Paraná, Brazil
- Height: 1.72 m (5 ft 7 1/2 in)
- Position: Forward

Team information
- Current team: Al-Naft

Senior career*
Years	Team	Apps	(Gls)
2012	Marília	1	(0)
2012–2014	Coimbra	0	(0)
2013–2014	→ Marília (loan)	0	(0)
2014–2015	Guaratinguetá	10	(1)
2014–2015	→ Coimbra (loan)	0	(0)
2015	Rio Branco	0	(0)
2015–2020	Colorado	0	(0)
2016	→ Luverdense (loan)	0	(0)
2016–2017	→ Gandzasar Kapan (loan)	24	(5)
2017–2019	→ Banants (loan)	37	(11)
2019	→ Tokyo Verdy (loan)	4	(0)
2020	Floriana	0	(0)
2021–2022	Al-Suwaiq		
2022	Al-Nahda		
2023	Dhofar		
2023–2025	Al-Jubail		
2025–	Jeddah	32	(5)
2026–	Al-Naft		
- * Club domestic league appearances and goals as of 14:56, 28 March 2023 (UTC)

Walmerson García Praia (born 13 January 1994), known as Walmerson or Wal, is a Brazilian professional footballer who plays as a forward for Al-Naft.

== Career ==
=== Club ===
On 25 January 2019, Banants announced that Walmerson had moved to Tokyo Verdy.

On 17 January 2020, Floriana announced the signing of Walmerson.

On 28 August 2025, Walmerson joined Saudi FDL club Jeddah.

== Career statistics ==
=== Club ===
As of match played 30 June 2019

Appearances and goals by club, season and competition
Club	Season	League			National Cup		Continental		Other		Total	
Club	Season	Division	Apps	Goals	Apps	Goals	Apps	Goals	Apps	Goals	Apps	Goals
Gandzasar Kapan (loan)	2016–17	Armenian Premier League	24	5	2	0	–		–		26	5
Banants (loan)	2017–18	Armenian Premier League	22	6	4	0	–		–		26	6
Banants (loan)	2018–19	Armenian Premier League	15	5	1	0	2	0	–		18	5
Banants (loan)	Total		37	11	5	0	2	0	-	-	42	11
Tokyo Verdy (loan)	2019	J2 League	4	0	0	0	–		–		4	0
Career total			65	16	7	0	2	0	-	-	72	16
