= Lester Peltier =

Trinidadian international footballer (born 1988)

Personal information
- Full name: Lester Stefan Peltier
- Date of birth: 13 September 1988 (age 38)
- Place of birth: Carenage, Trinidad and Tobago
- Height: 1.84 m (6 ft 0 in)
- Positions: Forward; winger

Youth career
- St. Anthony's College

Senior career*
Years	Team	Apps	(Gls)
2006–2009	San Juan Jabloteh		
2010–2011	Ma Pau	8	(1)
2011–2012	AS Trenčín	25	(11)
2012–2015	Slovan Bratislava	91	(15)
2016	Irtysh Pavlodar	0	(0)
2016	Příbram	5	(0)
2017	Maasmechelen	0	(0)
2017	Alashkert	17	(2)
2018	Banants	13	(6)
2018	Alashkert	1	(0)
2018–2019	Al-Mujazzal		(10)
2019	Al-Orobah	11	(5)
2019–2020	Al Hala		(7)
2020	Al-Taqadom		(7)

International career
2005–2006	Trinidad and Tobago U17	22	(0)
2007–2008	Trinidad and Tobago U20	8	(0)
2008–2019	Trinidad and Tobago	41	(6)
- * Club domestic league appearances and goals as of 19 September 2018

Lester Stefan Peltier (born 13 September 1988) is a Trinidadian international footballer who plays as a forward.

== Career ==
=== Club ===
Peltier attended St. Anthony's College in Trinidad playing on his school's football team as the striker position. and had trials with Club Brugge, Arsenal, Millwall and Cardiff City. In 2007, English Premiership club Portsmouth offered Peltier a four-year contract after a successful trial, but could not conclude the deal due to his failure to attain a work permit. In April 2011 he signed with AS Trenčín and made his debut on 10 April 2011. On 19 June 2012, Slovan Bratislava confirmed the signing of Peltier from AS Trenčín on a four-year contract.

On 7 February 2016, Peltier signed for Irtysh Pavlodar of the Kazakhstan Premier League. Little over a week later, Peltier and Irtysh Pavlodar agreed to cancel his contract by mutual consent due to family circumstances.

On 30 July 2018, Peltier re-joined Alashkert, but left the club 6-weeks later to join Saudi second tier club Al-Mujazzal.

=== International ===
He also represented Trinidad and Tobago at the Under 17, Under 20 levels and played for Scorpion United scoring 6 goals. Peltier made his international debut for the Trinidad and Tobago national football team on 26 January 2008 against Puerto Rico coming on as a substitute in the 46th minute. Peltier scored his first international hat-trick at the Hasley Crawford Stadium in October 2011 during a World Cup qualifier.

He announced his international retirement on 7 June 2021.

== Personal life ==
Lester's brother, Johan, is also a professional footballer, currently playing for Junior Sevan.

== Career statistics ==
=== Club ===
As of match played 19 July 2018

Appearances and goals by club, season and competition
Club	Season	League			National Cup		Continental		Other		Total	
Club	Season	Division	Apps	Goals	Apps	Goals	Apps	Goals	Apps	Goals	Apps	Goals
Trenčín	2010–11	1. liga	7	1	0	0	-		-		7	1
Trenčín	2011–12	Slovak Super Liga	25	11	1	0	-		-		26	11
Trenčín	Total		32	12	1	0	-	-	-	-	33	12
Slovan Bratislava	2012–13	Fortuna Liga	29	10	4	3	2	0	-		35	13
Slovan Bratislava	2013–14	Fortuna Liga	25	2	5	2	2	0	-		32	4
Slovan Bratislava	2014–15	Fortuna Liga	29	3	2	0	8	0	1	0	40	3
Slovan Bratislava	2015–16	Fortuna Liga	8	0	2	2	2	0	-		12	2
Slovan Bratislava	Total		91	15	13	7	14	0	1	0	119	22
Irtysh Pavlodar	2016	Kazakhstan Premier League	0	0	0	0	–		–		0	0
1. FK Příbram	2015–16	Czech First League	5	0	0	0	–		–		5	0
Maasmechelen	2016–17	Belgian First Amateur Division	0	0	0	0	–		–		0	0
Alashkert	2016–17	Armenian Premier League	10	0	0	0	-		0	0	10	0
Alashkert	2017–18	Armenian Premier League	7	2	1	0	-		2	0	10	2
Alashkert	Total		17	2	1	0	-	-	2	0	20	2
Banants	2017–18	Armenian Premier League	13	6	2	0	–		–		15	6
Banants	2018–19	Armenian Premier League	0	0	0	0	-		2	0	2	0
Banants	Total		13	6	2	0	-	-	2	0	17	6
Alashkert	2018–19	Armenian Premier League	1	0	0	0	–		–		1	0
Career total			159	35	17	7	14	0	5	0	195	42

=== International ===
Trinidad and Tobago national team
Year	Apps	Goals
2008	2	0
2009	0	0
2010	7	1
2011	6	4
2012	2	0
2013	5	0
2014	7	0
2015	5	0
2016	1	0
Total	35	5

Statistics accurate as of match played 8 January 2016

=== International goals ===
Scores and results list Trinidad and Tobago's goal tally first.

#	Date	Venue	Opponent	Score	Result	Competition
1	4 November 2010	Manny Ramjohn Stadium, Marabella	Guyana	1–0	2–1	2010 Caribbean Championship qualification
2	11 October 2011	Hasely Crawford Stadium, Port of Spain	Barbados	1–0	4–0	2014 FIFA World Cup qualification
3.	11 October 2011	Hasely Crawford Stadium, Port of Spain	Barbados	2–0	4–0	2014 FIFA World Cup qualification
4.	11 October 2011	Hasely Crawford Stadium, Port of Spain	Barbados	3–0	4–0	2014 FIFA World Cup qualification
5.	15 November 2011	Hasely Crawford Stadium, Marabella	Guyana	2–0	3–0	2014 FIFA World Cup qualification
6.	13 November 2014	Montego Bay Sports Complex, Montego Bay	French Guiana	3–0	4–2	2014 Caribbean Cup

== Honours ==
Slovan Bratislava

- Slovak Super Liga (2): 2012–13, 2013–14
- Slovak Cup (1): 2012–13
