= Mikhail Solovyov (footballer, born 1997) =

Russian footballer

Personal information
- Full name: Mikhail Aleksandrovich Solovyov
- Date of birth: 7 April 1997 (age 29)
- Place of birth: Khabarovsk, Russia
- Height: 1.80 m (5 ft 11 in)
- Position: Midfielder

Senior career*
Years	Team	Apps	(Gls)
2014–2015	CSKA Moscow	0	(0)
2016–2017	Solyaris Moscow	28	(1)
2017–2018	Armavir	20	(1)
2018	→ Banants (loan)	15	(1)
2019	Mashuk-KMV Pyatigorsk	10	(1)
2019–2020	Neftekhimik Nizhnekamsk	10	(0)
2020–2021	SKA-Khabarovsk	1	(0)
2021–2022	SKA-Khabarovsk-2	12	(1)
- * Club domestic league appearances and goals

Mikhail Aleksandrovich Solovyov (Russian: Михаил Александрович Соловьёв; born 7 April 1997) is a Russian former football player.

== Club career ==
Solovyov made his debut in the Russian Professional Football League for FC Solyaris Moscow on 11 April 2016 in a game against FC Volga Tver.

On 20 July 2018, Solovyov signed for FC Banants on loan from FC Armavir.

He made his Russian Football National League debut for FC Neftekhimik Nizhnekamsk on 7 July 2019 in a game against FC Mordovia Saransk.
