= Nathaniel Asamoah =

Ghanaian football striker

Personal information
- Full name: Nathaniel Ohene Asamoah
- Date of birth: 22 February 1990 (age 36)
- Place of birth: Accra, Ghana
- Height: 1.76 m (5 ft 9 in)
- Position: Striker

Senior career*
Years	Team	Apps	(Gls)
2008–2010	All Stars	–	(–)
2011	Asante Kotoko	–	(–)
2012–2013	Red Star Belgrade	12	(1)
2013–2015	Medeama	40	(20)
2015	Raja Casablanca	3	(0)
2016–2018	Aduana Stars	40	(10)
2018–2019	Banants	17	(2)

International career^{‡}
2015–	Ghana	8	(0)
- * Club domestic league appearances and goals as of 30 May 2019 ‡ National team caps and goals as of 2 April 2017

Nathaniel Ohene Asamoah (born February 22, 1990) is a Ghanaian football striker who last played for FC Banants.

== Club career ==
Born in Accra, Nathaniel Ohene Asamoah began his professional career with All Stars. In January 2011 he joined Asante Kotoko. A year later, in February 2012, he signed a contract with Serbian club Red Star Belgrade. He returned to Ghana when his contract expired at the end of the 2012–13 season. In September 2013, Asamoah joined Medeama. In the 2015 Ghana premier league season, he scored 18 goals trailing one goal to the top scorer title to Kofi Owusu. In August 2015, he signed at Raja Casablanca.

On 26 July 2018, Asamoah signed for FC Banants, being released by mutual consent on 1 June 2019.

== International career ==
In second half of 2011 Asamoah received a call up for Ghana national team against Swaziland and Brazil, but hasn't entered the game in any of those occasions.

He finally made a debut for Ghana on May 25, 2015, in a friendly match against Madagascar.

== Career statistics ==
=== Club ===
As of 1 June 2013

Club performance			League		Cup		Continental		Total	
Season	Club	League	Apps	Goals	Apps	Goals	Apps	Goals	Apps	Goals
Serbia			League		Serbian Cup		Europe		Total	
2011–12	Red Star	Superliga	1	0	0	0	0	0	1	0
2012–13	Red Star	Superliga	11	1	1	0	2	0	14	1
			League		Cup		Continental		Total	
Total	Serbia		12	1	1	0	2	0	15	1
Career total			12	1	1	0	2	0	15	1

== Honours ==
Red Star

- Serbian Cup (1): 2011–12

Medeama

- Ghanaian FA Cup: 2015
- Ghana Super Cup: 2015
