= Aleksandar Đoković =

Serbian footballer

Aleksandar Đoković Александар Ђоковић
Personal information
- Date of birth: 16 December 1991 (age 34)
- Place of birth: Kosovska Mitrovica, SFR Yugoslavia
- Height: 1.80 m (5 ft 11 in)
- Position: Forward

Team information
- Current team: Sloga Kraljevo

Youth career
- Partizan

Senior career*
Years	Team	Apps	(Gls)
2009	Partizan	1	(0)
2009–2011	Teleoptik	35	(7)
2012–2013	Bežanija	33	(3)
2013	Hapoel Nir Ramat HaSharon	4	(0)
2014	LA Galaxy II	14	(1)
2014	Bežanija	12	(2)
2015	Napredak Kruševac	5	(0)
2015–2016	Mladost Lučani	5	(0)
2016–2017	Novi Pazar	22	(1)
2017–2018	Banants	25	(1)
2018–2021	Mačva Šabac	39	(3)
2021–2022	Sloga Požega		
2022	Bajina Basta		
2023–	Sloga Kraljevo		

International career
2007–2008	Serbia U17	5	(0)
2009	Serbia U19	3	(0)
- * Club domestic league appearances and goals as of 18 May 2021

Aleksandar Đoković (Serbian Cyrillic: Александар Ђоковић; also transliterated Aleksandar Djoković; born 16 December 1991) is a Serbian footballer.

== Senior career ==
In 2013, Đoković moved to Hapoel Nir Ramat HaSharon of the Israel Premier League; however, after a lack of playing time, Đoković signed with LA Galaxy II of the third division American league, USL Pro. Galaxy II are the reserve team of Major League Soccer outfit, LA Galaxy.

Đoković scored his first goal for Galaxy II on April 8, 2014 against Oklahoma City Energy FC en route to a 4–2 victory for Galaxy II. On May 14, 2014, Đoković netted his second goal for Galaxy II in a U.S. Open Cup match against fifth division side Cal FC, en route to a 6–1 victory.

== International career ==
Đoković represented Serbia at Under-17 and Under-19 level.
