= Edward Kpodo =

Ghanaian footballer (born 1990)

Personal information
- Full name: Edward Kpodo
- Date of birth: 14 January 1990 (age 36)
- Place of birth: Sunyani, Ghana
- Height: 1.86 m (6 ft 1 in)
- Position: Defender

Team information
- Current team: Berekum Chelsea
- Number: 28

Senior career*
Years	Team	Apps	(Gls)
2011–2013	Berekum Chelsea		
2013	→ Khimki (loan)	11	(0)
2013–2014	Shinnik Yaroslavl	24	(0)
2014	Shirak	0	(0)
2014–2015	Ulisses	14	(1)
2015	Berekum Chelsea	0	(0)
2016–2017	Gandzasar Kapan	17	(1)
2017	Shirak	11	(0)
2018–2020	Urartu	56	(4)
2020–	Berekum Chelsea	4	(0)
- * Club domestic league appearances and goals as of 6 January 2021

Edward Kpodo (born 14 January 1990) is a Ghanaian football defender who plays for Berekum Chelsea.

== Career ==
In February 2013, Kpodo moved to FC Khimki on loan from Berekum Chelsea F.C., signing permanently for fellow Russian Football League side FC Shinnik Yaroslavl on a one-year contract in July 2013. A year layer Kpodo moved to the Armenian Premier League with Ulisses FC. After a year with Ulisses, Kpodo returned to Ghana with Berekum Chelsea in June 2015, but did not feature for the club as they failed to receive his International Transfer Certificate from Ulisses until December 2015. In February 2016, Kpodo moved back to Armenia, signing a one-year contract with Gandzasar Kapan. On 6 December 2019, Kpodo signed a new contracts with FC Urartu. On 4 July 2020, Urartu announced that Kpodo had left the club after his contract was terminated by mutual consent.

== Career statistics ==
As of match played 17 June 2020

Appearances and goals by club, season and competition
Club	Season	League			National Cup		Continental		Other		Total	
Club	Season	Division	Apps	Goals	Apps	Goals	Apps	Goals	Apps	Goals	Apps	Goals
Khimki (loan)	2012–13	Russian Football League	11	0	0	0	–		–		11	0
Shinnik Yaroslavl	2013–14	Russian Football League	24	1	2	0	–		–		26	1
Shirak	2014–15	Armenian Premier League	0	0	0	0	2	0	–		2	0
Ulisses	2014–15	Armenian Premier League	14	1	1	0	–		–		15	1
Gandzasar Kapan	2015–16	Armenian Premier League	7	1	2	0	–		-		9	1
Gandzasar Kapan	2016–17	Armenian Premier League	10	0	0	0	–		-		10	0
Gandzasar Kapan	Total		17	1	2	0	-	-	-	-	19	1
Shirak	2017–18	Armenian Premier League	11	0	2	0	2	0	1	0	16	0
Banants/Urartu	2017–18	Armenian Premier League	13	1	2	0	–		-		15	1
Banants/Urartu	2018–19	Armenian Premier League	27	3	3	0	2	0	–		32	3
Banants/Urartu	2019–20	Armenian Premier League	16	0	1	0	2	0	–		19	0
Banants/Urartu	Total		53	4	6	0	4	0	-	-	63	4
Career total			133	7	13	0	8	0	1	0	155	7

== Honours ==
Berekum Chelsea

- Ghanaian Premier League (1): 2010–11
