= Aram Ayrapetyan =

Armenian professional football player

Personal information
- Full name: Aram Yuryevich Ayrapetyan
- Date of birth: 22 November 1986 (age 39)
- Place of birth: Sochi, Soviet Union
- Height: 1.92 m (6 ft 4 in)
- Position: Goalkeeper

Senior career*
Years	Team	Apps	(Gls)
2008	Sochi-04	20	(0)
2009	FC Adler		
2010–2012	Kuzbass Kemerovo	58	(0)
2012–2014	Smena Komsomolsk-na-Amure	54	(0)
2014	Banants	8	(0)
2015–2016	Ararat Yerevan	26	(0)
2017–2020	Urartu	64	(0)
2020	Paykan	11	(0)
2021–2023	Atyrau	45	(0)
2023	Maktaaral	12	(0)
2024	Kaisar	0	(0)

International career
2018–2019	Armenia	18	(0)
- * Club domestic league appearances and goals

Aram Yuryevich Ayrapetyan (Armenian: Արամ Հայրապետյան; Russian: Арам Юрьевич Айрапетян; born 22 November 1986) is a former professional football goalkeeper. Born in Russia, he represented the Armenia national team.

== Career ==
=== Club ===
On 13 January 2020, Ayrapetyan left FC Urartu, signing for the Iranian team Paykan a couple days later.

== Career statistics ==
=== International ===
As of match played 18 November 2019

Appearances and goals by national team and year
National team	Year	Apps	Goals
Armenia	2018	8	0
Armenia	2019	10	0
Total		18	0
