= Borislav Jovanović (footballer) =

Serbian footballer

Personal information
- Date of birth: 16 August 1986 (age 40)
- Place of birth: Sremska Mitrovica, SFR Yugoslavia
- Height: 1.91 m (6 ft 3 in)
- Position: Centre back

Senior career*
Years	Team	Apps	(Gls)
2007–2009	Srem	49	(2)
2009–2011	Inđija	28	(2)
2011–2015	Ergotelis	75	(3)
2015–2017	Larissa	41	(3)
2017–2019	Banants	31	(0)
- * Club domestic league appearances and goals as of 1 December 2018

Borislav (Boki) Jovanović (Serbian: Борислав Јовановић, born 16 August 1986) is a professional Serbian football player.

He moved to Ergotelis from Serbian club FK Inđija on 1 June 2011.
