= Nenad Injac =

Serbian footballer

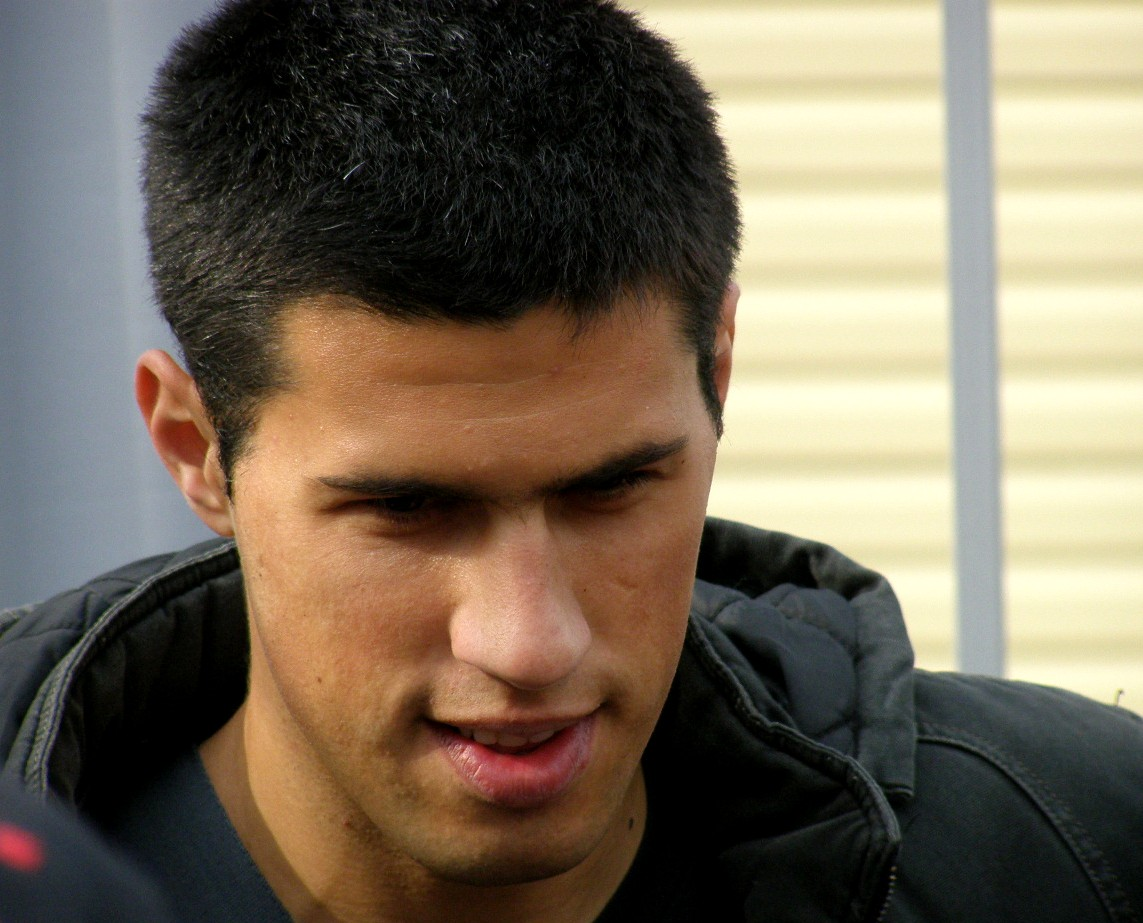

Personal information
- Date of birth: 4 September 1985 (age 41)
- Place of birth: Belgrade, SFR Yugoslavia
- Height: 1.92 m (6 ft 3 1/2 in)
- Position: Forward

Senior career*
Years	Team	Apps	(Gls)
2003−2007	Radnički Beograd	51	(29)
2004−2005	→ Železničar Beograd (loan)	38	(14)
2006	→ Mladenovac (loan)	7	(4)
2007−2008	Borac Čačak	16	(4)
2008	Amkar Perm	14	(2)
2009	Volga Nizhny Novgorod	20	(2)
2010−2011	OFK Beograd	28	(3)
2011	Al-Ansar	5	(1)
2012−2013	Bežanija	19	(8)
2013−2014	Atyrau	13	(2)
2014	Rad	10	(3)
2014	Voždovac	8	(1)
2015–2016	Ergotelis	8	(2)
2016−2017	Zemun	10	(0)
2017	Banants	19	(5)
2018	Navbahor Namangan	8	(1)
2019−2020	Brodarac		
- * Club domestic league appearances and goals

Nenad Injac (Serbian Cyrillic: Ненад Ињац; born 4 September 1985) is a Serbian retired football forward.

== Career ==
Born in Belgrade, SR Serbia, he previously played for FK Radnički Jugopetrol, FK Železničar Beograd, OFK Mladenovac, FK Borac Čačak, FC Amkar Perm, FC Volga Nizhny Novgorod, OFK Beograd, Al-Ansar, Bežanija, Atyrau, Rad, Voždovac and Ergotelis.
