= Lubambo Musonda =

Zambian footballer (born 1995)

Personal information
- Date of birth: 1 March 1995 (age 31)
- Place of birth: Lusaka, Zambia
- Height: 1.71 m (5 ft 7 in)
- Position: Left winger

Team information
- Current team: 1. FC Magdeburg
- Number: 19

Senior career*
Years	Team	Apps	(Gls)
2012	National Assembly		
2013–2014	Power Dynamos		
2014–2015	Ulisses	13	(2)
2015–2019	Gandzasar Kapan	97	(16)
2019–2021	Śląsk Wrocław	55	(0)
2021	Śląsk Wrocław II	2	(1)
2021–2024	Horsens	58	(4)
2023–2024	→ Silkeborg (loan)	24	(0)
2024–	1. FC Magdeburg	42	(3)

International career^{‡}
- Zambia U20
- Zambia U23
2014–	Zambia	56	(2)
- * Club domestic league appearances and goals as of 18 May 2026 ‡ National team caps and goals as of 14:34, 22 November 2025 (UTC)

Lubambo Musonda (born 1 March 1995) is a Zambian professional footballer who plays as a left winger for German 2. Bundesliga club 1. FC Magdeburg and the Zambia national team.

== Club career ==
Musonda has played for National Assembly, Power Dynamos and Ulisses.

Following the 2015 Africa Cup of Nations, Musonda went on trial with FC Aktobe.

In August 2015 Musonda signed for Gandzasar Kapan.

On 19 January 2019, Śląsk Wrocław announced the signing of Musonda on a one-and-a-half-year contract, with the option to extend the contract for two additional years. After two and a half years in Poland, Musonda joined Danish 1st Division club AC Horsens on 16 August 2021, signing a deal until June 2024. In August 2023, Musonda joined Silkeborg IF on a one-year loan deal.

On 27 May 2024, it was announced that Musonda would sign for German 2. Bundesliga club 1. FC Magdeburg on 1 July 2024.

== International career ==
At the youth level Musonda played in the 2015 African U-20 Championship, scoring against Mozambique in its qualifiers, and the 2015 Africa U-23 Cup of Nations.

Musonda made his senior international debut for Zambia in 2014. In December 2014, he was named as part of Zambia's preliminary squad for the 2015 Africa Cup of Nations.

On 10 December 2025, Musonda was called up to the Zambia squad for the 2025 Africa Cup of Nations.

== Career statistics ==
=== Club ===
As of match played 20 March 2021

Appearances and goals by club, season and competition
Club	Season	League			National cup (Note: Includes Armenian Cup, Polish Cup)		Continental		Other		Total	
Club	Season	Division	Apps	Goals	Apps	Goals	Apps	Goals	Apps	Goals	Apps	Goals
Ulisses	2014–15	Armenian Premier League	13	2	2	0	—		—		15	2
Gandzasar Kapan	2015–16	Armenian Premier League	25	0	4	1	—		—		29	1
Gandzasar Kapan	2016–17	Armenian Premier League	29	3	2	1	—		—		31	4
Gandzasar Kapan	2017–18	Armenian Premier League	26	8	4	2	2 (Note: Appearances in UEFA Europa League)	0	—		33	10
Gandzasar Kapan	2018–19	Armenian Premier League	17	5	2	0	2	1	1 (Note: Appearance in Armenian Supercup)	0	22	6
Gandzasar Kapan	Total		97	16	12	4	4	1	1	0	115	21
Śląsk Wrocław	2018–19	Ekstraklasa	12	0	0	0	—		—		12	0
Śląsk Wrocław	2019–20	Ekstraklasa	25	0	0	0	—		—		25	0
Śląsk Wrocław	2020–21	Ekstraklasa	16	0	1	0	—		—		17	0
Śląsk Wrocław	Total		53	0	1	0	—		—		54	0
Career total			163	18	15	4	4	1	1	0	183	23

=== International ===
As of match played 15 November 2025

Appearances and goals by national team and year
National team	Year	Apps	Goals
Zambia	2014	3	1
Zambia	2015	9	1
Zambia	2016	6	0
Zambia	2018	5	0
Zambia	2020	4	0
Zambia	2021	8	0
Zambia	2022	5	0
Zambia	2023	5	0
Zambia	2024	7	0
Zambia	2025	4	0
Total		56	2

Scores and results list Zambia's goal tally first, score column indicates score after each Musonda goal.

List of international goals scored by Lubambo Musonda
No.	Date	Venue	Opponent	Score	Result	Competition
1	6 June 2014	Raymond James Stadium, Tampa, USA	Japan	3–3	3–4	Friendly
2	15 November 2015	Levy Mwanawasa Stadium, Ndola, Zambia	Sudan	1–0	2–0	2018 FIFA World Cup qualification

== Honours ==
Gandzasar

- Armenian Cup: 2017–18

Silkeborg

- Danish Cup: 2023–24
