= Ognjen Krasić =

Serbian footballer

Personal information
- Full name: Ognjen Krasić
- Date of birth: 9 April 1988 (age 38)
- Place of birth: Zrenjanin, SFR Yugoslavia
- Height: 1.75 m (5 ft 9 in)
- Position: Right midfielder

Senior career*
Years	Team	Apps	(Gls)
2005–2006	Proleter Zrenjanin	8	(0)
2006–2009	Vojvodina	0	(0)
2006–2007	→ Tekstilac Odžaci (loan)	16	(0)
2007–2008	→ Proleter Novi Sad (loan)	16	(1)
2008	→ Palić (loan)	11	(2)
2009	→ Sloboda Tuzla (loan)	17	(0)
2010	Sloboda Tuzla	9	(0)
2011–2012	Proleter Novi Sad	23	(3)
2012	Taraz	13	(0)
2013–2015	Tobol Kostanay	85	(8)
2016	Voždovac	12	(1)
2016	Nasaf Qarshi	12	(3)
2017	Voždovac	11	(2)
2017–2018	Banants	27	(1)
2018–2019	Proleter Novi Sad	14	(1)
2019–2020	Voždovac	15	(1)
2020	→ Inđija (loan)	6	(1)
- * Club domestic league appearances and goals as of 18:57, 6 September 2020 (UTC)

Ognjen Krasić (Serbian Cyrillic: Огњен Красић; born 9 April 1988) is a Serbian footballer.

== Career ==
In February 2016, Krasić signed for FK Voždovac.

On 26 July 2018, FC Banants announced that Krasić had left the club following the expiration of his contract.
