= Rumyan Hovsepyan =

Armenian footballer

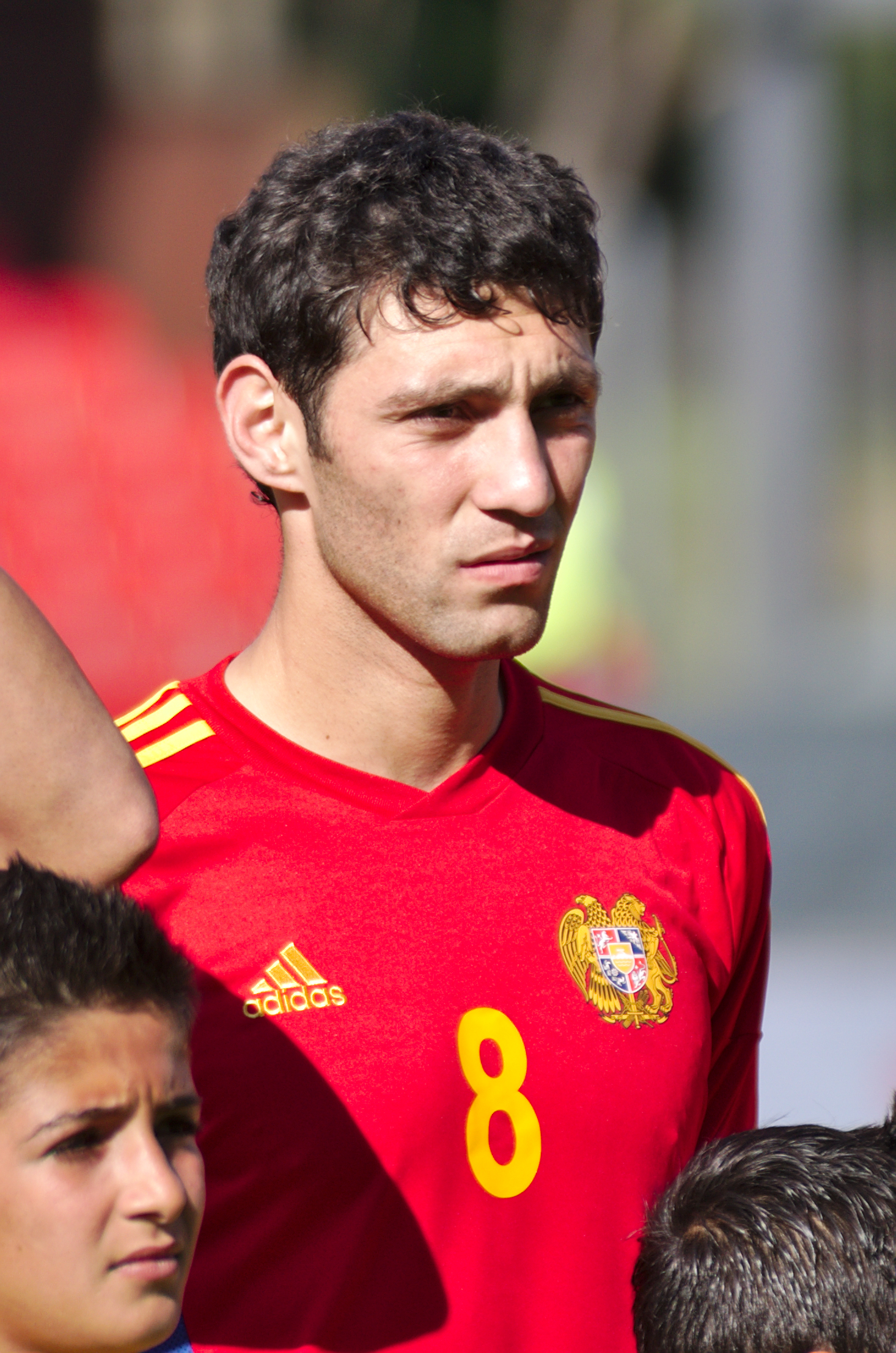

Personal information
- Date of birth: 13 November 1991 (age 34)
- Place of birth: Yerevan, Armenia
- Height: 1.86 m (6 ft 1 in)
- Position: Defensive midfielder

Team information
- Current team: Lernayin Artsakh
- Number: 8

Youth career
- 2007: Patani FC
- 2008–2010: FC Pyunik-2

Senior career*
Years	Team	Apps	(Gls)
2010–2013	Impuls	54	(6)
2013–2014	Banants	28	(6)
2014–2015	Metalurh Donetsk	11	(0)
2015	Pyunik	0	(0)
2015	Stal Dniprodzerzhynsk	3	(0)
2016–2017	Shirak	38	(6)
2017–2018	Banants	28	(8)
2018–2019	Pyunik	27	(4)
2019–2020	Arda Kardzhali	24	(1)
2020–2022	Alashkert	31	(1)
2022	Floriana	13	(1)
2022–2023	Alashkert	11	(0)
2023	Van	12	(3)
2023	Noah	2	(0)
2024–2025	Alashkert	25	(0)
2025–	Lernayin Artsakh	7	(0)

International career
2014–2019	Armenia	22	(2)
- * Club domestic league appearances and goals as of 1 June 2026

Rumyan Hovsepyan (Armenian: Ռումյան Հովսեփյան, born 13 November 1991) is an Armenian football player who plays for Lernayin Artsakh. Hovsepyan is also a former member of the Armenia national football team. He usually plays as a defensive midfielder.

== Career ==
=== Club ===
Hovsepyan left Shirak on 9 June 2017 by mutual consent.

On 26 June 2019 he signed a contract with the newly promoted to the Bulgarian First League team Arda Kardzhali. On 27 July, he scored the historic first ever goal for the team from Kardzhali in the top division of Bulgarian football, netting the equalizer in the 3:1 home win over Beroe.

In August 2025, Hovsepyan joined Armenian First League side Lernayin Artsakh.

=== International ===
Hovsepyan played his first international game with the national team on 27 May 2014, in a friendly against the United Arab Emirates. He scored his first international goal on his debut match.

== Career statistics ==
=== Club ===
As of match played 26 August 2018

Club	Season	League			National Cup		Continental		Total	
Club	Season	Division	Apps	Goals	Apps	Goals	Apps	Goals	Apps	Goals
Banants	2013–14	Armenian Premier League	26	5	4	0	–		30	5
Banants	2014–15	Armenian Premier League	2	1	0	0	2	2	4	3
Banants	Total		28	6	4	0	2	2	34	8
Metalurh Donetsk	2014–15	Ukrainian Premier League	11	0	0	0	–		11	0
Pyunik	2015–16	Armenian Premier League	0	0	0	0	3	0	3	0
Stal Dniprodzerzhynsk	2015–16	Ukrainian Premier League	3	0	1	0	–		4	0
Shirak	2015–16	Armenian Premier League	10	3	0	0	0	0	10	3
Shirak	2016–17	Armenian Premier League	28	3	3	0	3	0	34	3
Shirak	Total		38	6	3	0	3	0	44	6
Banants	2017–18	Armenian Premier League	28	8	3	1	–		31	9
Pyunik	2018–19	Armenian Premier League	2	1	0	0	4	0	6	1
Career total			110	21	11	1	12	2	133	24

=== International ===
Armenia national team
Year	Apps	Goals
2014	7	1
2015	1	0
2016	0	0
2017	2	1
2018	5	0
2019	2	0
Total	17	2

Statistics accurate as of match played 9 November 2017

=== International goals ===
Scores and results list Armenia's goal tally first.

#	Date	Venue	Opponent	Score	Result	Competition
1.	27 May 2014	Stade de la Fontenette, Carouge, Switzerland	United Arab Emirates	4–2	4–3	Friendly
2.	9 November 2017	Vazgen Sargsyan Republican Stadium, Yerevan, Armenia	Belarus	3–0	4–1	Friendly

== Family ==
His father Andranik Hovsepyan, in Soviet times played for FC Ararat Yerevan, the top scorer of the 1993 Armenian Premier League. He was also a player of the Armenia national football team.
