= Stepan Ghazaryan =

Armenian footballer

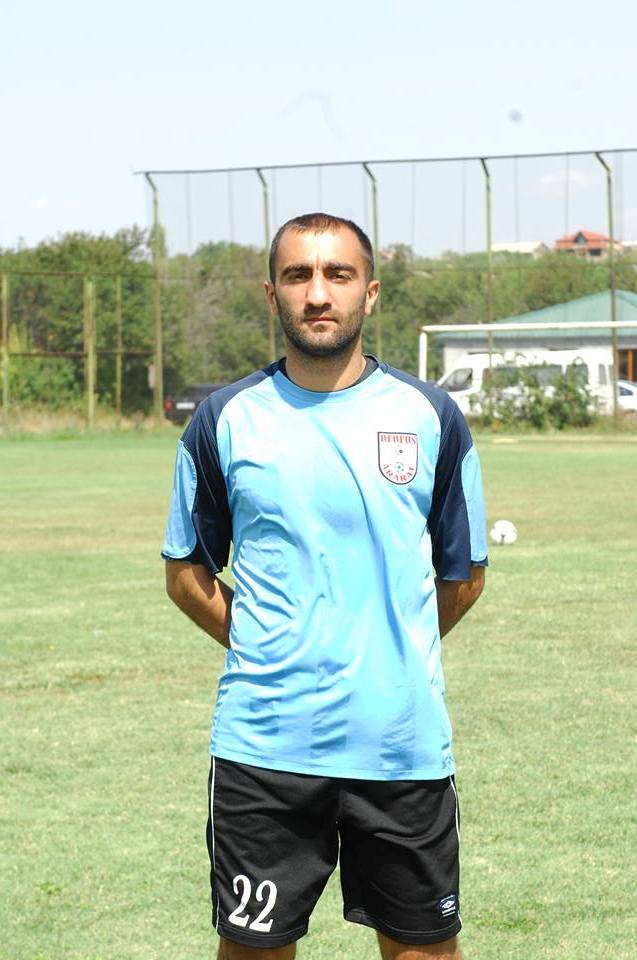

Personal information
- Date of birth: 11 January 1985 (age 41)
- Place of birth: Soviet Union
- Height: 1.79 m (5 ft 10 in)
- Position: Goalkeeper

Senior career*
Years	Team	Apps	(Gls)
2007–2013	Banants	79	(0)
2013–2014	FC Ararat Yerevan	28	(0)
2014–2015	Alashkert FC	18	(0)
2015–2019	Banants	49	(0)
2020	TuS Rotenhof		

International career
2010	Armenia	2	(0)
2019	Artsakh	2	(0)

Managerial career
- 2021–: Urartu (goalkeeper coach)
- * Club domestic league appearances and goals

Stepan Ghazaryan (Armenian: Ստեփան Ղազարյան; born 11 January 1985) is an Armenian former footballer. Ghazaryan has played for the Armenia U-17 in the UEFA European Under-17 Championship.

== Career ==
=== International ===
Ghazaryan represented Artsakh at the 2019 CONIFA European Football Cup.
