= Nairi Stadium =

Football stadium in Yerevan, Armenia

Coordinates: 40.154605°N 44.475231°E

Nairi Stadium Նաիրի մարզադաշտ
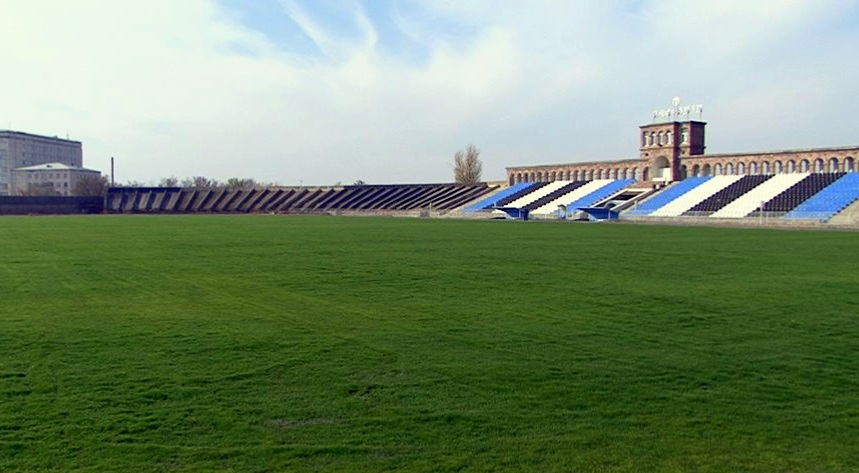
- Nairi Stadium
- Interactive map of Nairi Stadium; Նաիրի մարզադաշտ
- Former names: Alashkert Stadium
- Location: Yerevan, Armenia
- Owner: FC Urartu
- Capacity: 6,850 (1,850 seated)
- Surface: grass
- Field size: 110 x 70 meters

Construction
- Built: 1960

Tenants
- Alashkert (2011–2024); Noah (2019–2022); Shengavit (unknown); Van Yerevan (unknown)

Nairi Stadium (Armenian: Նաիրի մարզադաշտ) is a football stadium in Yerevan, Armenia. It was known as Alashkert Stadium between 2013 and 2024, being home to the local football club FC Alashkert. The stadium is located in Shengavit District, adjacent to Lake Yerevan, on the left bank of Hrazdan River.

== Overview ==
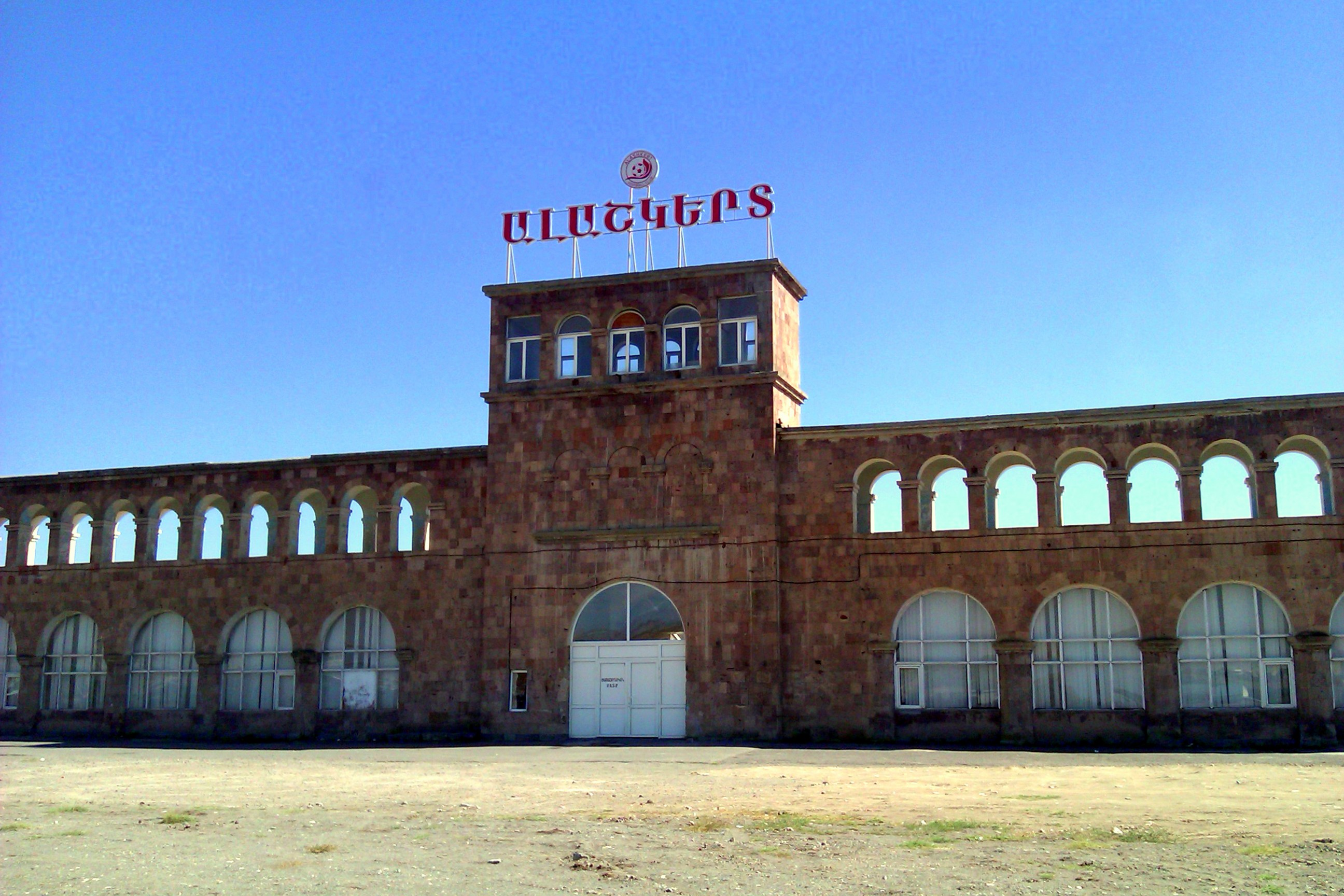
The main entrance

Nairi Stadium was built and opened in 1960 within the frames of the expansion of the Shengavit District, known as Spandaryan raion during that period.

With a capacity of 6,850 spectators, the stadium was home to FC Alashkert (formerly based in Martuni) of the Armenian Premier League between 2013 and 2024. It became the property of the club in February 2013. By the end of the year, the old pitch was replaced with a new natural turf in accordance with the international standards.

In July 2024, FC Urartu took over the stadium in order to rebuild the venue entirely to become their future home ground in the Armenian Premier League with an expected capacity of 10,000 seats.
