= Urartu Stadium =

Football stadium in Yerevan, Armenia

Coordinates: 40°10′17″N 44°27′00″E

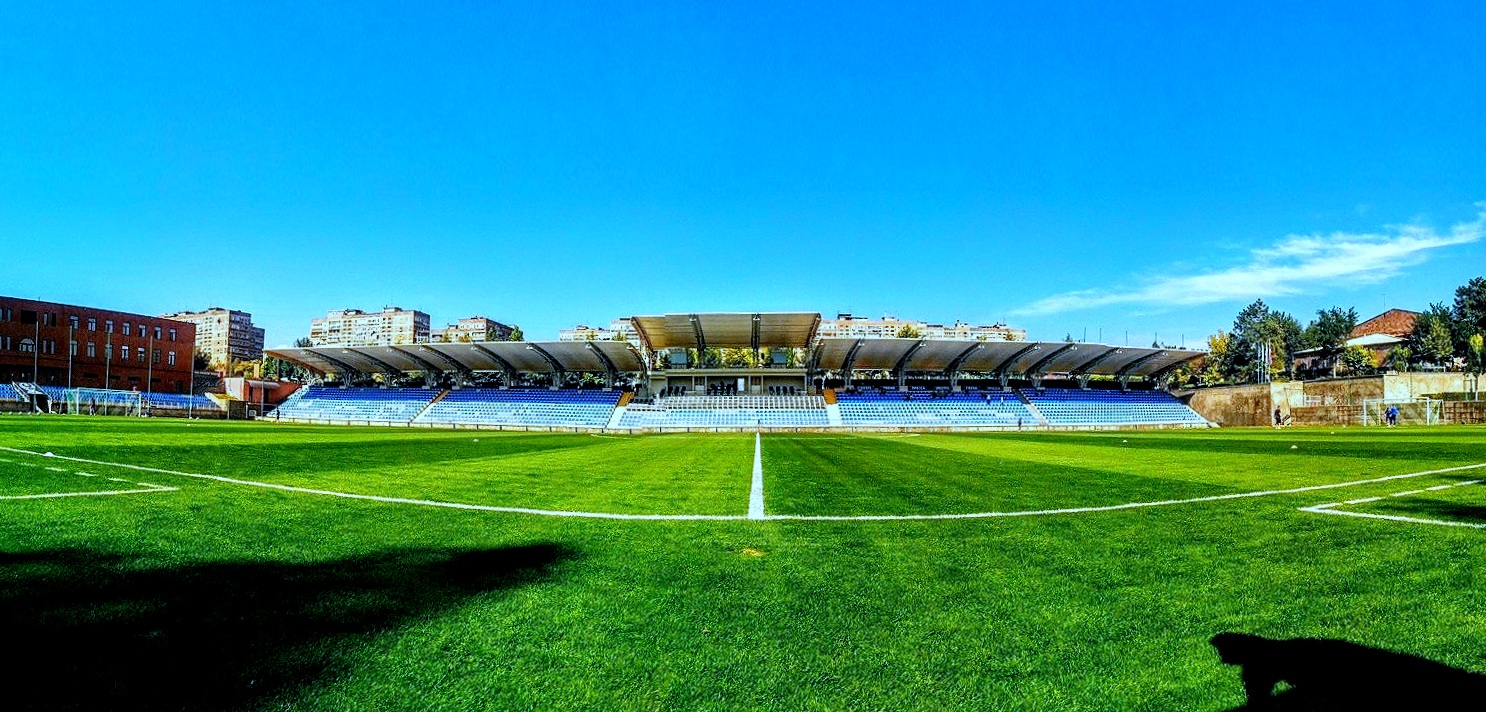
- Urartu Stadium in 2015
- Interactive map of Urartu Stadium
- Location: Malatia-Sebastia district Yerevan, Armenia
- Owner: Urartu
- Capacity: 4,860
- Surface: Grass
- Field size: 105 x 68 meters

Construction
- Built: 2006 - 2007
- Opened: 2008
- Renovated: 2011; 2019

Tenant
- Urartu (2008-present)

Urartu Stadium (Armenian: Ուրարտու Մարզադաշտ) is an all-seater football stadium in the Malatia-Sebastia District of Yerevan, Armenia. The stadium is home to Urartu FC and has a capacity of 4,860 seats. It was known as Banants Stadium until 1 August 2019, when it was officially renamed Urartu Stadium.

== Overview ==
Urartu Stadium is located within the sports complex of Urartu Training Centre, occupying the southern part of the complex.

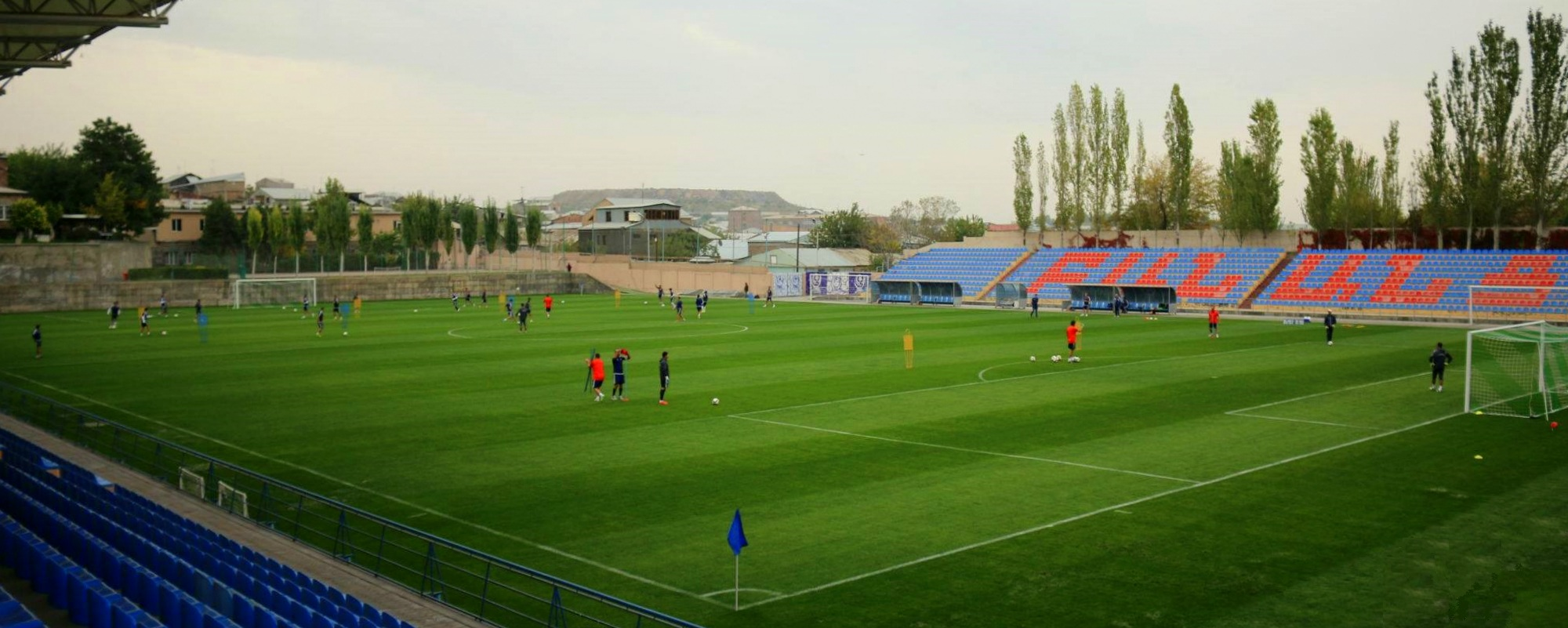
General view

The construction of the stadium was launched in 2006 with the assistance of the FIFA Goal Programme. It was officially opened in 2008 with a capacity of 3,600 seats.

Further developments were implemented later in 2011, when the playing pitch was modernized and the capacity of the stadium was increased up to 4,860 seats; 2,760 at the northern stand, 1,500 at the southern stand and 600 at the western stand.

The surrounding training centre of the club consists of 3 regular-sized training fields as well as 4 mini-football grounds, and an indoor mini-football training field.

The stadium was entirely renovated during the 1st quarter of 2019 when floodlights were installed and other facilities were upgraded prior to the 2019 UEFA European Under-19 Championship.

== Notable tournaments ==
The stadium hosted 3 matches of the 7th group during the 2017 UEFA European Under-19 Championship qualification:

10 November 2016
12:00

| Switzerland | 4–0 | Armenia |
|---|---|---|
| Schmid 15'; Muheim 25'; Domgjoni 58'; Qela 70' | Report |

Banants Stadium, Yerevan
Referee: Danilo Grujić (Serbia)

12 November 2016
12:00

| Italy | 2–1 | Armenia |
|---|---|---|
| Cutrone 13'; Marchizza 90+3' (pen.) | Report | Petrosyan 81' |

Banants Stadium, Yerevan
Referee: Danilo Grujić (Serbia)

15 November 2016
12:00

| Italy | 1–1 | Switzerland |
|---|---|---|
| Gabbia 16' | Report | Guillemenot 37' |

Banants Stadium, Yerevan
Referee: Andris Treimanis (Latvia)
