= 2016–17 FC Shirak season =

Shirak
2016-17 season
- Chairman: Arman Sahakyan
- Manager: Vardan Bichakhchyan
- Stadium: Gyumri City Stadium
- Premier League: 3rd
- Armenian Cup: Winners
- Europa League: Second qualifying round vs Spartak Trnava
- Top goalscorer: League: Viulen Ayvazyan (8); All: Viulen Ayvazyan (8)
- Highest home attendance: 2,747 vs Spartak Trnava (14 July 2016)
- Lowest home attendance: 225 vs Gandzasar Kapan (31 May 2017)
- Average home league attendance: 793 (31 May 2017)

The 2016–17 season was Shirak's 26th consecutive season in the Armenian Premier League and covers the period from 1 July 2016 to 30 June 2017.

== Squad ==
As of match played 31 May 2017

No.	Name	Nationality	Position	Date of birth (age)	Signed from	Signed in	Contract ends	Apps.	Goals
Goalkeepers
12	Sokrat Hovhannisyan	(Armenia)	GK	5 April 1996 (aged 21)	Youth team	2016		0	0
13	Anatoliy Ayvazov	(Armenia)	GK	8 June 1996 (aged 20)	Pyunik	2016		32	0
45	Vsevolod Yermakov	(Russia)	GK	6 January 1996 (aged 21)		2015		10	0
Defenders
2	Arman Hovhannisyan	(Armenia)	DF	7 July 1993 (aged 23)	Alashkert	2015		56	1
3	Artyom Mikaelyan	(Armenia)	DF	12 July 1991 (aged 25)	Youth team	2010		76	0
4	Semen Datsenko	(Ukraine)	DF	10 May 1994 (aged 23)	Inhulets Petrove	2017		8	0
6	Marko Prljević	(Serbia)	DF	2 August 1988 (aged 28)	Borac Banja Luka	2016		8	0
14	Arman Tadevosyan	(Armenia)	DF	26 September 1994 (aged 22)	Youth team	2013		11	0
21	Gevorg Hovhannisyan	(Armenia)	DF	16 June 1983 (aged 33)	Youth team	2003			
23	Robert Darbinyan	(Armenia)	DF	1 June 1990 (aged 26)		2016		49	1
25	Aghvan Davoyan	(Armenia)	DF	21 March 1990 (aged 27)	Youth team	2010			
Midfielders
8	Rumyan Hovsepyan	(Armenia)	MF	13 November 1991 (aged 25)	Stal Dniprodzerzhynsk	2016		44	6
16	Arman Aslanyan	(Armenia)	MF	30 January 1994 (aged 23)	Youth team	2013		8	0
17	Vahan Bichakhchyan	(Armenia)	MF	9 July 1999 (aged 17)	Youth team	2015		28	6
19	Solomon Udo	(Nigeria)	MF	15 July 1995 (aged 21)	Ulisses	2016		46	1
20	Oumarou Kaina	(Cameroon)	MF	16 October 1996 (aged 20)		2017		12	1
22	Ghukas Poghosyan	(Armenia)	MF	6 February 1994 (aged 23)		2016		22	3
28	Mohamed Kaba	(Ivory Coast)	MF	5 April 1989 (aged 28)	Al Ahli	2015		56	3
37	Rudik Mkrtchyan	(Armenia)	MF	26 October 1998 (aged 18)	Youth team	2016		2	0
39	Milutin Ivanović	(Serbia)	MF	30 October 1990 (aged 26)	Car Konstantin	2017		4	0
42	Artush Mirzakhanyan	(Armenia)	MF	30 September 1998 (aged 18)	Youth team	2016		1	0
88	Moussa Bakayoko	(Ivory Coast)	MF	27 December 1996 (aged 20)	Raja Casablanca	2017		14	2
Forwards
7	Viulen Ayvazyan	(Armenia)	FW	1 January 1995 (aged 22)	Pyunik	2015		66	15
18	Aram Muradyan	(Armenia)	FW	14 April 1995 (aged 22)	Youth Team	2013		69	4
27	Aram Tosunyan	(Armenia)	FW	29 May 1993 (aged 24)	Youth team	2011			
38	Kyrian Nwabueze	(Nigeria)	FW	11 December 1992 (aged 24)		2017		12	3
41	Arlen Tsaturyan	(Armenia)	FW	5 January 1999 (aged 18)	Youth Team	2016		2	0
55	Fatawu Safiu	(Ghana)	FW	16 July 1994 (aged 22)	loan from International Allies	2017	2017	9	0
Players out on loan
Players who left during the season
1	Norayr Abrahamyan	(Armenia)	GK	30 October 1985 (aged 31)	Youth team	2009			
4	Kostyantyn Shults	(Ukraine)	MF	24 June 1993 (aged 23)	Hirnyk-Sport Komsomolsk	2016		4	0
9	Konan Kouakou	(Ivory Coast)	FW	27 October 1995 (aged 21)		2015		25	6
9	Bryan de la Fuente	(United States)	MF	1 July 1992 (aged 24)	Ararat Yerevan	2016		12	1
10	Davit Hakobyan	(Armenia)	MF	21 March 1993 (aged 24)	Youth team	2010			
11	Edvard Panosyan	(Armenia)	FW	11 October 1992 (aged 24)	Youth team	2013		31	1
15	Karen Aleksanyan	(Armenia)	MF	17 June 1980 (aged 36)	Ulisses	2011			
17	Kouadio Franck Ismael Brou	(Ivory Coast)	MF	25 December 1995 (aged 21)		2016		1	0
36	Drissa Diarrassouba	(Ivory Coast)	FW	15 November 1994 (aged 22)	Ivoire Academie	2016		49	7
55	Georgy Gogichayev	(Russia)	FW	16 January 1991 (aged 26)	Alania Vladikavkaz	2016		12	1
77	Nemanja Stošković	(Serbia)	MF	21 February 1990 (aged 27)		2016		28	2

== Transfers ==
=== In ===
Date	Position	Nationality	Name	From	Fee	Ref.
1 July 2016	GK	(Armenia)	Anatoliy Ayvazov	Pyunik	Undisclosed	
1 July 2016	MF	(Armenia)	Ghukas Poghosyan		Free	
1 July 2016	MF	(Ivory Coast)	Kouadio Franck Ismael Brou		Undisclosed	
1 July 2016	MF	(Ivory Coast)	Mohamed Doumouya	SC Gagnoa	Undisclosed	
9 August 2016	DF	(Ukraine)	Kostyantyn Shults	Hirnyk-Sport Komsomolsk	Undisclosed	
12 August 2016	DF	(Serbia)	Marko Prljević	Borac Banja Luka	Undisclosed	
26 August 2016	MF	(Japan)	Akihiri Takada	METTA/Latvijas Universitāte	Undisclosed	
30 August 2016	FW	(Russia)	Georgy Gogichayev	Alania Vladikavkaz	Undisclosed	
1 September 2016	MF	(United States)	Bryan de la Fuente	Ararat Yerevan	Undisclosed	
28 February 2017	GK	(Russia)	Vsevolod Yermakov		Free	
28 February 2017	DF	(Ukraine)	Semen Datsenko	Inhulets Petrove	Undisclosed	
28 February 2017	MF	(Cameroon)	Oumarou Kaina		Free	
28 February 2017	MF	(Ivory Coast)	Moussa Bakayoko	Raja Casablanca	Undisclosed	
28 February 2017	MF	(Serbia)	Milutin Ivanović	Car Konstantin	Undisclosed	
28 February 2017	FW	(Nigeria)	Kyrian Nwabueze		Free	

=== Loan in ===
Start date	Position	Nationality	Name	From	End date	Ref.
28 February 2017	FW	(Ghana)	Fatawu Safiu	International Allies	9 June 2017	

=== Out ===
Date	Position	Nationality	Name	From	Fee	Ref.
29 July 2016	FW	(Ivory Coast)	Drissa Diarrassouba	Padideh	Undisclosed	
14 October 2016	MF	(Ivory Coast)	Kouadio Franck Ismael Brou	Ararat Yerevan	Undisclosed	

=== Released ===
Date	Position	Nationality	Name	Joined	Date
1 August 2016	FW	(United States)	Eder Arreola	Arizona United	28 April 2017
10 October 2016	MF	(Japan)	Akihiri Takada	Topvar Topoľčany	23 February 2017
30 December 2016	DF	(Ukraine)	Kostyantyn Shults	Atlantas	17 January 2017
30 December 2016	MF	(United States)	Bryan de la Fuente	California United	
30 December 2016	MF	(Serbia)	Nemanja Stošković	Sloboda Užice	1 August 2017
30 December 2016	FW	(Russia)	Georgy Gogichayev	Dacia Chișinău	14 September 2017
31 December 2016	GK	(Armenia)	Norayr Abrahamyan		
31 December 2016	MF	(Ivory Coast)	Mohamed Doumouya	Stade Tunisien	15 December 2017
31 December 2016	FW	(Armenia)	Edvard Panosyan		
31 December 2016	FW	(Ivory Coast)	Konan Kouakou	Atlantis	1 May 2017
7 January 2017	MF	(Armenia)	Karen Aleksanyan	Retired	
1 February 2017	MF	(Armenia)	Davit Hakobyan	Retired	1 July 2018
9 June 2017	MF	(Serbia)	Milutin Ivanović	Radnički Niš	2 August 2017
9 June 2017	MF	(Armenia)	Rumyan Hovsepyan	Banants	
30 June 2017	DF	(Armenia)	Arman Hovhannisyan	Zirka Kropyvnytskyi	
30 June 2017	DF	(Armenia)	Gevorg Hovhannisyan	Banants	
30 June 2017	DF	(Armenia)	Arman Tadevosyan		
30 June 2017	MF	(Armenia)	Ghukas Poghosyan	Banants	

== Competitions ==
=== Premier League ===
==== Results summary ====
Overall								Home						Away					
Pld	W	D	L	GF	GA	GD	Pts	W	D	L	GF	GA	GD	W	D	L	GF	GA	GD
30	16	5	9	31	24	+7	53	7	3	5	13	10	+3	9	2	4	18	14	+4

Last updated: 31 May 2017.
Source: See Results

==== Results ====
6 August 2016 1	Shirak	3 – 1	Pyunik	Gyumri
17:30 (UTC+4)	G. Hovhannisyan (yellow card) 16'; Ayvazyan 21', 45+1'; A.Davoyan (yellow card) 25' (yellow-red card) 81'; A.Hovhannisyan (yellow card) 60'; A.Tadevosyan (yellow card) 89'; A.Muradyan 90+4'	Report	D.Manoyan 61' (pen.); Ra.Hakobyan (yellow card) 72'	Stadium: Gyumri City Stadium; Attendance: 1,000; Referee: Artur Safaryan

14 August 2016 2	Banants	0 – 1	Shirak	Yerevan
18:00 (UTC+4)	A.Bareghamyan (yellow card) 34'	Report	Shults (yellow card) 15'; Hakobyan 90'; Udo (yellow card) 90'	Stadium: Banants Stadium; Attendance: 1,000; Referee: Zaven Hovhannisyan

20 August 2016 3	Shirak	1 – 0	Ararat Yerevan	Gyumri
17:00 (UTC+4)	Bichakhchyan 86'; A.Muradyan (yellow card) 89'	Report	H.Simelela (yellow card) 88'	Stadium: Gyumri City Stadium; Attendance: 700; Referee: Gevorg Eghoyan

27 August 2016 4	Shirak	2 – 2	Alashkert	Gyumri
17:00 (UTC+4)	Daghbashyan 16' (o.g.); Ayvazyan 44'; A.Davoyan (yellow card) 57'; M.Kaba (yellow card) 68'	Report	K.Veranyan (yellow card) 4'; Kvekveskiri (yellow card) 26' (goal) 47'; Mikaelyan 61' (o.g.); Tasić (yellow card) 69'	Stadium: Gyumri City Stadium; Attendance: 1,100; Referee: Suren Baliyan

11 September 2016 5	Gandzasar Kapan	0 – 1	Shirak	Kapan
16:00 (UTC+4)	Claudir (yellow card) 37'; H.Asoyan (yellow card) 68'; Arm.Petrosyan (yellow card) 85'; Harutyunyan (yellow card) 89'	Report	G.Hovhannisyan (yellow card) 31'; Mikaelyan (yellow card) 39'; A.Hovhannisyan (yellow card) 63'; A.Muradyan 88'; A.Ayvazov (yellow card) 90+2'	Stadium: Gandzasar Stadium; Attendance: 1,500; Referee: Suren Baliyan

18 September 2016 6	Pyunik	0 – 0	Shirak	Yerevan
18:00 (UTC+4)		Report	M.Kaba (yellow card) 42'; A.Davoyan (yellow card) 77'; Mikaelyan (yellow card) 90+1'	Stadium: Yerevan Football Academy Stadium; Attendance: 500; Referee: Zaven Hovhannisyan

27 September 2016 7	Shirak	0 – 1	Banants	Gyumri
16:00 (UTC+4)	Stošković (yellow card) 39'; Aleksanyan (yellow card) 55'; M.Kaba (yellow card) 65'; A.Davoyan (yellow card) 80'; A.Muradyan (yellow card) 89'	Report	N.Minasyan 51'; Burayev (yellow card) 89'	Stadium: Gyumri City Stadium; Attendance: 500; Referee: Artur Safaryan

1 October 2016 8	Ararat Yerevan	0 – 1	Shirak	Yerevan
18:00 (UTC+4)	V.Arzoyan (yellow card) 29'; Daudov (yellow card) 45'; Kone (yellow card) 61'; A.Loretsyan (yellow card) 80'	Report	Hovsepyan 50'; Stošković (yellow card) 55'; Hakobyan (yellow card) 70'	Stadium: Vazgen Sargsyan Republican Stadium; Attendance: 400; Referee: Artur Simonyan

16 October 2016 9	Alashkert	1 – 1	Shirak	Yerevan
15:00 (UTC+4)	Gyozalyan 33' (pen.); Khovbosha (yellow card) 38'; Minasyan (yellow card) 53'; Tasić (yellow card) 86'	Report	Gogichayev 75'	Stadium: Alashkert Stadium; Attendance: 500; Referee: Suren Baliyan

22 October 2016 10	Shirak	1 – 0	Gandzasar Kapan	Gyumri
15:00 (UTC+4)	M.Kaba (yellow card) 28' de la Fuente 47'; Hakobyan (yellow card) 63'	Report	A.Khachatryan (yellow card) 40'; Memović (yellow card) 60'	Stadium: Gyumri City Stadium; Attendance: 500; Referee: Zaven Hovhannisyan

26 October 2016 11	Shirak	0 – 1	Pyunik	Gyumri
15:00 (UTC+4)	Hovsepyan (yellow card) 83'	Report	Kartashyan 41'	Stadium: Gyumri City Stadium; Attendance: 200; Referee: Artur Simonyan

29 October 2016 12	Banants	1 – 2	Shirak	Yerevan
15:00 (UTC+4)	H.Avagyan (yellow card) 5'; Adams (yellow card) 12'; G.Aghekyan 22' (yellow card) 26'; H.Hambardzumyan (yellow card) 41'; V.Ayvazyan (yellow card) 81'	Report	Ayvazyan 6' (pen.); Hovsepyan (yellow card) 34'; M.Kaba 45+1'; A.Hovhannisyan (yellow card) 56'; Hakobyan (yellow card) 82'; Prljević (yellow card) 90+2'	Stadium: Banants Stadium; Attendance: 500; Referee: Artur Safaryan

4 November 2016 13	Shirak	2 – 0	Ararat Yerevan	Gyumri
15:00 (UTC+4)	Ayvazyan 17'; Stošković (yellow card) 25'; Poghosyan 83'; A.Davoyan (yellow card) 88'	Report	S.Mkrtchyan (yellow card) 86'; A.Petrosyan (yellow card) 88'	Stadium: Gyumri City Stadium; Attendance: 600; Referee: Artur Safaryan

20 November 2016 14	Shirak	0 – 0	Alashkert	Gyumri
15:00 (UTC+4)	A.Hovhannisyan (yellow card) 23'; Hakobyan (yellow card) 47'; Udo (yellow card) 73'	Report	Voskanyan (yellow card) 64'; Grigoryan (yellow card) 90'	Stadium: Gyumri City Stadium; Attendance: 1,000; Referee: Artur Simonyan

23 November 2016 15	Gandzasar Kapan	1 – 0	Shirak	Kapan
15:00 (UTC+4)	Harutyunyan 62'; Al.Petrosyan (yellow card) 67'	Report	Poghosyan (yellow card) 38'; M.Kaba (yellow card) 67'	Stadium: Gandzasar Stadium; Attendance: 700; Referee: Zaven Hovhannisyan

26 November 2016 17	Pyunik	0 – 2	Shirak	Yerevan
16:00 (UTC+4)	S.Grigoryan (yellow card) 13'; Avetisyan (yellow card) 45'	Report	Ayvazyan 11', 71'; G.Hovhannisyan (yellow card) 20'; Gogichayev (yellow card) 49' de la Fuente (yellow card) 54'; Udo (yellow card) 89'	Stadium: Yerevan Football Academy Stadium; Attendance: 300; Referee: Suren Baliyan

4 December 2016 17	Banants	0 – 1	Shirak	Yerevan
14:00 (UTC+4)	V.Ayvazyan (yellow card) 85'	Report	Mikaelyan (yellow card) 60'; M.Kaba (yellow card) 82'; Bichakhchyan 89'; A.Ayvazov (yellow card) 90+3'	Stadium: Banants Stadium; Attendance: 600; Referee: Artur Safaryan

5 March 2017 18	Ararat Yerevan	0 – 1	Shirak	Yerevan
14:00 (UTC+4)	G.Tumbaryan (yellow card) 11'; Go.Poghosyan (yellow card) 21'; R.Safaryan (yellow card) 58'	Report	Bichakhchyan 29'; Darbinyan (yellow card) 50'; Hovsepyan (yellow card) 74'	Stadium: Banants-3; Attendance: 300; Referee: Gevorg Eghoyan

12 March 2017 19	Alashkert	3 – 0	Shirak	Yerevan
14:00 (UTC+4)	Arta.Yedigaryan 11'; Dashyan 37'; Nenadović 45'; Artu.Yedigaryan (yellow card) 72'	Report	A.Muradyan (yellow card) 61'; Darbinyan (yellow card) 88'	Stadium: Alashkert Stadium; Attendance: 700; Referee: Zaven Hovhannisyan

18 March 2017 20	Shirak	1 – 2	Gandzasar Kapan	Gyumri
14:00 (UTC+4)	Bichakhchyan (yellow card) 76' (yellow-red card) 79'; Bakayoko 90'	Report	V.Bakalyan 71'; Memović (yellow card) 73'; Ishkhanyan 85'; Kpodo (yellow card) 90+1'	Stadium: Gyumri City Stadium; Attendance: 500; Referee: Suren Baliyan

1 April 2017 21	Shirak	0 – 2	Pyunik	Gyumri
15:00 (UTC+4)	G.Hovhannisyan (yellow card) 6'; A.Davoyan (yellow card) 41'; A.Hovhannisyan (yellow card) 56'; Hovsepyan (yellow card) 68'; Safiu (yellow card) 90+3'	Report	Kartashyan 37'; Avetisyan 39' (pen.) (yellow card) 43'	Stadium: Gyumri City Stadium; Attendance: 500; Referee: Artur Simonyan

7 April 2017 22	Shirak	1 – 0	Banants	Gyumri
16:00 (UTC+4)	Ivanović (yellow card) 24'; Darbinyan (yellow card) 61'; Nwabueze 89' (yellow card) 89'	Report	V.Ayvazyan (yellow card) 26'	Stadium: Gyumri City Stadium; Attendance: 400; Referee: Artur Safaryan

15 April 2017 23	Shirak	1 – 0	Ararat Yerevan	Gyumri
16:00 (UTC+4)	Bichakhchyan 27'; Safiu (yellow card) 90+5'; Poghosyan (yellow card) 90+5'	Report	R.Yeghiazaryan (yellow card) 73'; P.Ayvazyan (red card) 90+5'	Stadium: Gyumri City Stadium; Attendance: 400; Referee: Artur Safaryan

23 April 2017 24	Shirak	0 – 1	Alashkert	Gyumri
17:00 (UTC+4)	A.Hovhannisyan (yellow card) 90'	Report	Arakelyan 25'; Voskanyan (red card) 90+4'	Stadium: Gyumri City Stadium; Attendance: 700; Referee: Suren Baliyan

29 April 2017 25	Gandzasar Kapan	3 – 2	Shirak	Yerevan
19:00 (UTC+4)	Musonda 17' (yellow card) 34'; Claudir 62'; Walmerson 81' (yellow card) 90+4'	Report	Hovsepyan 41' (pen.); Bakayoko 56'; G.Hovhannisyan (yellow card) 90+3'	Stadium: Vazgen Sargsyan Republican Stadium; Attendance: 300; Referee: Artur Simonyan

6 May 2017 26	Pyunik	0 – 2	Shirak	Yerevan
16:00 (UTC+4)	Arutyunyan (yellow card) 83'	Report	Hovsepyan (yellow card) 29'; Ayvazyan 65'; Datsenko (yellow card) 89'; Poghosyan 90+2'	Stadium: Yerevan Football Academy Stadium; Attendance: 300; Referee: Artur Simonyan

14 May 2017 27	Shirak	1 – 0	Banants	Gyumri
17:00 (UTC+4)	Ayvazyan (yellow card) 39'; Udo 78'	Report	H.Hambardzumyan (yellow card) 19'; V.Ayvazyan (yellow card) 58'	Stadium: Gyumri City Stadium; Attendance: 300; Referee: Artur Simonyan

20 May 2017 28	Ararat Yerevan	2 – 3	Shirak	Yerevan
17:00 (UTC+4)	R.Safaryan (yellow card) 6' (goal) 44'; V.Arzoyan (yellow card) 45' (goal) 90'	Report	Hovsepyan 7'; Prljević 36'; Gh.Poghosyan 43'; Nwabueze (yellow card) 63'; A.Ayvazov (yellow card) 90+1'	Stadium: Banants-3; Attendance: 500; Referee: Artur Ayvazov

28 May 2017 29	Alashkert	3 – 1	Shirak	Yerevan
17:00 (UTC+4)	Voskanyan (yellow card) 15'; Arta.Yedigaryan 41'; Artu.Yedigaryan (yellow card) 44'; M.Manasyan 54'; Nenadović 63'	Report	Udo (yellow card) 43'; M.Kaba (yellow card) 47'; A.Muradyan 67' (yellow card) 90+2'	Stadium: Alashkert Stadium; Attendance: 1,000; Referee: Suren Baliyan

31 May 2017 30	Shirak	0 – 0	Gandzasar Kapan	Gyumri
17:00 (UTC+4)	Nwabueze (yellow card) 3'; G.Hovhannisyan (yellow card) 3'; Udo (yellow card) 40'; A.Mirzakhanyan (yellow card) 60'	Report	A.Petrosyan (yellow card) 3'	Stadium: Gyumri City Stadium; Attendance: 225; Referee: Artur Safaryan

==== Table ====
Pos	Team	Pld	W	D	L	GF	GA	GD	Pts	Qualification
1	Alashkert (C)	30	19	7	4	59	26	+33	64	Qualification for the Champions League first qualifying round
2	Gandzasar Kapan	30	17	6	7	38	24	+14	57	Qualification for the Europa League first qualifying round (Note: Shirak qualified for Europa League first qualifying round by winning the 2016–17 Armenian Cup. However, since they already qualified for European competition based on their league position, the spot awarded to the cup winners was passed down the league.)
3	Shirak	30	16	5	9	31	24	+7	53	Qualification for the Europa League first qualifying round
4	Pyunik	30	12	9	9	35	27	+8	45	Qualification for the Europa League first qualifying round
5	Banants	30	5	6	19	18	44	−26	21	
6	Ararat Yerevan	30	3	3	24	17	53	−36	12	

Source: Football Federation of Armenia (in Armenian), Soccerway
Rules for classification: 1) Points; 2) Play-off (only if deciding champion); 3) Matches won; 4) Head-to-head points; 5) Head-to-head matches won; 6) Head-to-head goal difference; 7) Head-to-head goals scored; 8) Head-to-head away goals scored; 9) Goal difference; 10) Goals scored.
(C) Champions

=== Armenian Cup ===
22 September 2016 Quarterfinal 1st leg	Kotayk	0 – 0	Shirak	Abovyan
16:00 (UTC+4)	A.Ghazaryan (yellow card) 35'; E.Mkrtchyan (yellow card) 89'	Report		Stadium: Abovyan City Stadium; Attendance: 150; Referee: Shahen Aghayan

18/19 October 2016 Quarterfinal 2nd leg	Shirak	3 – 0 (3 – 0 agg.)	Kotayk	Gyumri
(UTC+4)				Stadium: Gyumri City Stadium
Note: Match awarded 3-0 to Shirak.

12 April 2017 Semifinal 1st leg	Gandzasar Kapan	0 – 1	Shirak	Yerevan
16:00 (UTC+4)	Harutyunyan (yellow card) 88'	Report	A.Davoyan (yellow card) 35'; O.Kaina 45'; Hovsepyan (yellow card) 85'; Bakayoko (yellow card) 88'	Stadium: Vazgen Sargsyan Republican Stadium; Attendance: 300; Referee: Zaven Hovhannisyan

26 April 2017 Semifinal 2nd leg	Shirak	1 – 1 (2 – 1 agg.)	Gandzasar Kapan	Gyumri
16:00 (UTC+4)	O.Kaina (yellow card) 20'; Safiu (yellow card) 44'; Prljević (yellow card) 64'; V.Minasyan 66' (o.g.); Yermakov (yellow card) 90+1'; Udo (yellow card) 90+3'	Report	Musonda 40' (pen.); Walmerson (yellow card) 84'; Ishkhanyan (yellow card) 90+3'	Stadium: Gyumri City Stadium; Attendance: 500; Referee: Zaven Hovhannisyan

==== Final ====
24 May 2017	Pyunik	0 – 3	Shirak	Yerevan
19:00 (UTC+4)	V.Pogosyan (yellow card) 65'	Report	Nwabueze 6', 38'; Bichakhchyan 28'; Ayvazyan (yellow card) 89'	Stadium: Vazgen Sargsyan Republican Stadium; Attendance: 2,000; Referee: Zaven Hovhannisyan

=== UEFA Europa League ===
==== Qualifying rounds ====
30 June 2016 First qualifying round 1st leg	Dila Gori (Georgia (country))	1 – 0	(Armenia) Shirak	Gori, Georgia
19:00 (UTC+4)	Gongadze (yellow card) 24'; Modebadze 36'; T.Tsikaridze (yellow card) 40'; G.Samkharadze (yellow card) 41'; L.Nonikashvili (yellow card) 75'; Razmadze (yellow card) 88'	Report	M.Kaba (yellow card) 12'; D.Hakobyan (yellow card) 44'; K.Kouakou (yellow card) 80'; G. Hovhannisyan (yellow card) 90+7'	Stadium: Tengiz Burjanadze Stadium; Attendance: 2,512; Referee: Anatoliy Zhabchenko (Ukraine)

7 July 2016 First qualifying round 2nd leg	Shirak (Armenia)	1 – 0 (a.e.t.) (1 – 1 agg.) (4 – 1 p)	(Georgia (country)) Dila Gori	Gyumri, Armenia
18:00 (UTC+4)	D.Hakobyan (yellow card) 27'; Bichakhchyan 84'; A.Davoyan (yellow card) 84'	Report	G.Samkharadze (yellow card) 60'	Stadium: Gyumri City Stadium; Attendance: 2,400; Referee: Sergejus Slyva (Lithuania)
	Penalties
	Hovsepyan (penalty scored); Darbinyan (penalty scored); Ayvazyan (penalty scored); D.Hakobyan (penalty scored)		(penalty missed) Gongadze; (penalty missed) Kvirkvelia; (penalty scored) Razmadze

14 July 2016 Second qualifying round 1st leg	Shirak (Armenia)	1 – 1	(Slovakia) Spartak Trnava	Gyumri, Armenia
18:00 (UTC+4)	D.Hakobyan 16' (yellow card) 71'; Mikaelyan (yellow card) 55'	Report	Yao (yellow card) 39'; Sloboda (yellow card) 82'; Jirka 87'	Stadium: Gyumri City Stadium; Attendance: 2,747; Referee: Artyom Kuchin (Kazakhstan)

21 July 2016 Second qualifying round 2nd leg	Spartak Trnava (Slovakia)	2 – 0 (3 – 1 agg.)	(Armenia) Shirak	Trnava, Slovakia
23:15 (UTC+4)	Schranz 57'; Tambe 61'	Report	K.Kouakou (yellow card) 16'; Darbinyan (yellow card) 71'; Diarrassouba (yellow card) 90+2'	Stadium: Štadión Antona Malatinského; Attendance: 6,129; Referee: Arnold Hunter (Northern Ireland)

== Statistics ==
As of match played 31 May 2017

=== Appearances and goals ===
No.	Pos	Nat	Player	Total		Premier League		Armenian Cup		UEFA Europa League	
No.	Pos	Nat	Player	Apps	Goals	Apps	Goals	Apps	Goals	Apps	Goals
2	DF	(Armenia) ARM	Arman Hovhannisyan	25	0	18+2	0	1	0	2+2	0
3	DF	(Armenia) ARM	Artyom Mikaelyan	35	0	26+1	0	2+2	0	4	0
4	DF	(Ukraine) UKR	Semen Datsenko	8	0	3+3	0	2	0	0	0
6	DF	(Serbia) SRB	Marko Prljević	23	1	19	1	4	0	0	0
7	FW	(Armenia) ARM	Viulen Ayvazyan	34	8	23+5	8	2+2	0	0+2	0
8	MF	(Armenia) ARM	Rumyan Hovsepyan	34	3	24+4	3	3	0	3	0
13	GK	(Armenia) ARM	Anatoliy Ayvazov	32	0	27	0	1	0	4	0
14	DF	(Armenia) ARM	Arman Tadevosyan	3	0	1+2	0	0	0	0	0
16	MF	(Armenia) ARM	Arman Aslanyan	1	0	0+1	0	0	0	0	0
17	MF	(Armenia) ARM	Vahan Bichakhchyan	27	6	4+17	4	2+2	1	0+2	1
18	FW	(Armenia) ARM	Aram Muradyan	26	2	5+18	2	1+1	0	0+1	0
19	MF	(Nigeria) NGR	Solomon Udo	36	1	28	1	4	0	4	0
20	MF	(Cameroon) CMR	Oumarou Kaina	12	1	7+3	0	2	1	0	0
21	DF	(Armenia) ARM	Gevorg Hovhannisyan	21	0	16	0	1	0	4	0
22	MF	(Armenia) ARM	Ghukas Poghosyan	22	3	5+13	3	2	0	0+2	0
23	DF	(Armenia) ARM	Robert Darbinyan	18	0	12	0	2	0	4	0
25	DF	(Armenia) ARM	Aghvan Davoyan	30	0	23	0	4	0	2+1	0
28	MF	(Ivory Coast) CIV	Mohamed Kaba	28	1	20+2	1	1+2	0	3	0
37	MF	(Armenia) ARM	Rudik Mkrtchyan	2	0	1+1	0	0	0	0	0
38	FW	(Nigeria) NGR	Kyrian Nwabueze	12	3	9+1	1	1+1	2	0	0
39	MF	(Serbia) SRB	Milutin Ivanović	4	0	4	0	0	0	0	0
41	FW	(Armenia) ARM	Arlen Tsaturyan	2	0	1+1	0	0	0	0	0
42	MF	(Armenia) ARM	Artush Mirzakhanyan	1	0	0+1	0	0	0	0	0
45	GK	(Russia) RUS	Vsevolod Yermakov	5	0	2	0	3	0	0	0
55	FW	(Ghana) GHA	Fatawu Safiu	9	0	6+1	0	1+1	0	0	0
88	MF	(Ivory Coast) CIV	Moussa Bakayoko	14	2	6+5	2	2+1	0	0	0
Players who left Shirak during the season:
1	GK	(Armenia) ARM	Norayr Abrahamyan	1	0	1	0	0	0	0	0
4	DF	(Ukraine) UKR	Kostyantyn Shults	4	0	3+1	0	0	0	0	0
9	FW	(Ivory Coast) CIV	Konan Kouakou	4	0	0	0	0	0	4	0
9	MF	(United States) USA	Bryan de la Fuente	12	1	6+6	1	0	0	0	0
10	MF	(Armenia) ARM	Davit Hakobyan	20	2	14+2	1	0+1	0	3	1
15	MF	(Armenia) ARM	Karen Aleksanyan	6	0	3+2	0	1	0	0	0
17	MF	(Ivory Coast) CIV	Kouadio Franck Ismael Brou	1	0	0	0	0	0	0+1	0
36	FW	(Ivory Coast) CIV	Drissa Diarrassouba	4	0	0	0	0	0	3+1	0
55	FW	(Russia) RUS	Georgy Gogichayev	12	1	5+6	1	1	0	0	0
77	MF	(Serbia) SRB	Nemanja Stošković	19	0	8+6	0	1	0	4	0

=== Goal scorers ===
Place	Position	Nation	Number	Name	Premier League	Armenian Cup	UEFA Europa League	Total
1	FW	(Armenia)	7	Viulen Ayvazyan	8	0	0	8
2	MF	(Armenia)	17	Vahan Bichakhchyan	4	1	1	6
3	MF	(Armenia)	8	Rumyan Hovsepyan	3	0	0	3
3	MF	(Armenia)	22	Ghukas Poghosyan	3	0	0	3
3	FW	(Armenia)	18	Aram Muradyan	3	0	0	3
3	FW	(Nigeria)	38	Kyrian Nwabueze	1	2	0	3
7	MF	(Ivory Coast)	88	Moussa Bakayoko	2	0	0	2
7	MF	(Armenia)	10	Davit Hakobyan	1	0	1	2
7				Own goal	1	1	0	2
10	FW	(Russia)	55	Georgy Gogichayev	1	0	0	1
10	MF	(United States)	9	Bryan de la Fuente	1	0	0	1
10	MF	(Ivory Coast)	28	Mohamed Kaba	1	0	0	1
10	MF	(Nigeria)	19	Solomon Udo	1	0	0	1
10	DF	(Serbia)	6	Marko Prljević	1	0	0	1
10	MF	(Cameroon)	20	Oumarou Kaina	0	1	0	1
				TOTALS	31	5	2	38

=== Clean sheets ===
Place	Position	Nation	Number	Name	Premier League	Armenian Cup	UEFA Europa League	Total
1	GK	(Armenia)	13	Anatoliy Ayvazov	15	1	1	17
2	GK	(Russia)	45	Vsevolod Yermakov	1	2	0	3
3	GK	(Armenia)	1	Norayr Abrahamyan	1	0	0	1
				TOTALS	17	3	1	21

=== Disciplinary record ===
Number	Nation	Position	Name	Premier League		Armenian Cup		UEFA Europa League		Total	
Number	Nation	Position	Name	Yellow card	Red card	Yellow card	Red card	Yellow card	Red card	Yellow card	Red card
2	(Armenia)	DF	Arman Hovhannisyan	7	0	0	0	0	0	7	0
3	(Armenia)	DF	Artyom Mikaelyan	3	0	0	0	1	0	4	0
4	(Ukraine)	DF	Semen Datsenko	1	0	0	0	0	0	1	0
6	(Serbia)	DF	Marko Prljević	1	0	1	0	0	0	2	0
7	(Armenia)	FW	Viulen Ayvazyan	1	0	1	0	0	0	2	0
8	(Armenia)	MF	Rumyan Hovsepyan	5	0	0	0	0	0	5	0
13	(Armenia)	GK	Anatoliy Ayvazov	3	0	0	0	0	0	3	0
14	(Armenia)	DF	Arman Tadevosyan	1	0	0	0	0	0	1	0
17	(Armenia)	MF	Vahan Bichakhchyan	2	1	1	0	0	0	3	1
18	(Armenia)	FW	Aram Muradyan	5	0	0	0	0	0	5	0
19	(Nigeria)	MF	Solomon Udo	5	0	1	0	0	0	6	0
20	(Cameroon)	MF	Oumarou Kaina	0	0	1	0	0	0	1	0
21	(Armenia)	DF	Gevorg Hovhannisyan	5	0	0	0	1	0	6	0
22	(Armenia)	MF	Ghukas Poghosyan	2	0	0	0	0	0	2	0
23	(Armenia)	DF	Robert Darbinyan	3	0	0	0	1	0	4	0
25	(Armenia)	DF	Aghvan Davoyan	7	1	1	0	1	0	9	1
28	(Ivory Coast)	MF	Mohamed Kaba	7	0	0	0	1	0	8	0
38	(Nigeria)	FW	Kyrian Nwabueze	3	0	0	0	0	0	3	0
39	(Serbia)	MF	Milutin Ivanović	1	0	0	0	0	0	1	0
42	(Armenia)	MF	Artush Mirzakhanyan	1	0	0	0	0	0	1	0
45	(Russia)	GK	Vsevolod Yermakov	0	0	1	0	0	0	1	0
55	(Ghana)	FW	Fatawu Safiu	2	0	1	0	0	0	3	0
88	(Ivory Coast)	MF	Moussa Bakayoko	0	0	1	0	0	0	1	0
Players who left Shirak during the season:
4	(Ukraine)	MF	Kostyantyn Shults	1	0	0	0	0	0	1	0
9	(Ivory Coast)	FW	Konan Kouakou	0	0	0	0	2	0	2	0
9	(United States)	MF	Bryan de la Fuente	1	0	0	0	0	0	1	0
10	(Armenia)	MF	Davit Hakobyan	4	0	0	0	3	0	7	0
15	(Armenia)	MF	Karen Aleksanyan	1	0	0	0	0	0	1	0
36	(Ivory Coast)	FW	Drissa Diarrassouba	0	0	0	0	1	0	1	0
55	(Russia)	FW	Georgy Gogichayev	1	0	0	0	0	0	1	0
77	(Serbia)	MF	Nemanja Stošković	3	0	0	0	0	0	3	0
			TOTALS	78	1	6	0	11	0	96	1
