= 2018–19 Shirak SC season =

Shirak
2018-19 season
- Chairman: Arman Sahakyan
- Manager: Vardan Bichakhchyan
- Stadium: Gyumri City Stadium
- Premier League: 7th
- Armenian Cup: First Round vs Artsakh
- Top goalscorer: League: Two Players (4); All: Two Players (4)
- Highest home attendance: 800 vs Ararat-Armenia (11 November 2018)
- Lowest home attendance: 100 vs Alashkert (30 March 2019); 100 vs Banants (19 April 2019)
- Average home league attendance: 347 (19 May 2018)

The 2018–19 season was Shirak's 28th consecutive season in the Armenian Premier League, in which they finished the season in 7th place, their worst positioning since the 2011 season. Shirak also took part in the Armenian Cup, where they were knocked out by Artsakh in the first round.

== Squad ==
As of match played 31 May 2019

No.	Name	Nationality	Position	Date of birth (age)	Signed from	Signed in	Contract ends	Apps.	Goals
Goalkeepers
1	Sokrat Hovhannisyan	(Armenia)	GK	5 April 1996 (aged 23)	Youth team	2016		1	0
45	Vsevolod Yermakov	(Russia)	GK	6 January 1996 (aged 23)	Zenit-Izhevsk	2018		43	0
	Ferdinand Muradyan	(Armenia)	GK	29 October 1999 (aged 19)	Youth team	2017		0	0
Defenders
3	Aram Shakhnazaryan	(Armenia)	DF	21 April 1994 (aged 25)	Alashkert	2018		26	0
4	Artyom Mikaelyan	(Armenia)	DF	12 July 1991 (aged 27)	Youth team	2010		129	3
6	Marko Prljević	(Serbia)	DF	2 August 1988 (aged 30)	Proleter Novi Sad	2018		38	1
20	Zhirayr Margaryan	(Armenia)	DF	13 September 1997 (aged 21)	Banants	2018		49	1
25	Aghvan Davoyan	(Armenia)	DF	21 March 1990 (aged 29)	Youth team	2010			
40	Artur Amiryan	(Armenia)	DF	6 July 1997 (aged 21)	Youth team	2017		7	0
43	Seryozha Urushanyan	(Armenia)	DF	1 August 1997 (aged 21)	Youth team	2018		0	0
Midfielders
7	Arman Aslanyan	(Armenia)	MF	30 January 1994 (aged 25)	Youth team	2013		37	0
10	Khoren Veranyan	(Armenia)	MF	4 September 1986 (aged 32)	Alashkert	2018		23	0
18	Rafik Misakyan	(Armenia)	MF	2 January 2000 (aged 19)	Banants	2018		20	0
19	Karen Muradyan	(Armenia)	MF	1 November 1992 (aged 26)	Alashkert	2018		135	3
20	Rudik Mkrtchyan	(Armenia)	MF	26 October 1998 (aged 20)	Youth team	2016		19	0
41	Fatjon Jusufi	(North Macedonia)	MF	17 December 1995 (aged 23)	Partizani Tirana	2019		2	1
44	Levon Darbinyan	(Armenia)	MF	24 January 2002 (aged 17)	Youth team	2018		1	0
88	Moussa Bakayoko	(Ivory Coast)	MF	27 December 1996 (aged 22)		2018		71	17
Forwards
5	Artyom Gevorkyan	(Russia)	FW	21 May 1993 (aged 26)	Chayka Peschanokopskoye	2019		13	1
9	Aram Muradyan	(Armenia)	FW	14 April 1995 (aged 24)	Youth Team	2013		127	13
11	David Ghandilyan	(Armenia)	FW	4 June 1993 (aged 25)	Homenetmen Beirut	2019		30	2
17	Arlen Tsaturyan	(Armenia)	FW	5 January 1999 (aged 20)	Youth Team	2016		18	0
22	Bunjamin Shabani	(North Macedonia)	FW	30 January 1991 (aged 28)	Shkupi	2018		26	1
Players out on loan
Players who left during the season
2	Jean-Jacques Bougouhi	(Ivory Coast)	FW	12 June 1992 (aged 26)	SO de l'Armée	2018		44	25
11	Pablo Cruz	(United States)	MF	30 December 1991 (aged 27)	California United	2018		12	2
13	Eder Arreola	(United States)	FW	13 November 1991 (aged 27)	Ventura County Fusion	2018		21	1
15	Georgy Gogichayev	(Russia)	FW	16 January 1991 (aged 28)	Alania Vladikavkaz	2018		21	2
38	Moussa Diakité	(Mali)	MF	17 November 1998 (aged 20)	Atlético Astorga	2018		9	0
58	Henri Junior Ndong	(Gabon)	DF	23 August 1992 (aged 26)	Samtredia	2018		3	2
99	Kadima Kabangu	(Democratic Republic of the Congo)	FW	15 June 1993 (aged 25)	Budapest Honvéd	2018		16	2

== Transfers ==
=== In ===
Date	Position	Nationality	Name	From	Fee	Ref.
23 July 2018	GK	(Russia)	Vsevolod Yermakov	Zenit-Izhevsk	Undisclosed	
24 July 2018	FW	(Russia)	Georgy Gogichayev		Free	
27 July 2018	MF	(United States)	Eder Arreola	California United	Undisclosed	
30 July 2018	MF	(United States)	Pablo Cruz	California United	Undisclosed	
1 August 2018	DF	(North Macedonia)	Darko Ilieski	Pobeda	Undisclosed	
1 August 2018	DF	(Armenia)	Aram Shakhnazaryan	Pyunik	Undisclosed	
1 August 2018	MF	(Armenia)	Khoren Veranyan	Alashkert	Undisclosed	
1 August 2018	FW	(North Macedonia)	Bunjamin Shabani	Shkupi	Undisclosed	
2 August 2018	MF	(Mali)	Moussa Diakité	Atlético Astorga	Undisclosed	
2 August 2018	FW	(Democratic Republic of the Congo)	Kadima Kabangu	Budapest Honvéd	Undisclosed	
25 August 2018	DF	(Gabon)	Henri Junior Ndong	Samtredia	Undisclosed	
1 September 2018	MF	(Armenia)	Karen Muradyan		Free	
1 September 2018	MF	(Ivory Coast)	Moussa Bakayoko		Free	
1 September 2018	FW	(Ivory Coast)	Jean-Jacques Bougouhi	İstanbulspor	Undisclosed	
3 February 2019	DF	(Serbia)	Marko Prljević	Tsarsko Selo Sofia	Undisclosed	
6 February 2019	MF	(Armenia)	David Ghandilyan	Homenetmen Beirut	Undisclosed	
18 February 2019	MF	(North Macedonia)	Fatjon Jusufi	Partizani Tirana	Undisclosed	
18 February 2019	FW	(Russia)	Artyom Gevorkyan	Chayka Peschanokopskoye	Undisclosed	

=== Out ===
Date	Position	Nationality	Name	To	Fee	Ref.
16 August 2018	DF	(North Macedonia)	Darko Ilieski	Tikves	Undisclosed	
31 August 2018	MF	(Armenia)	David Ghandilyan	Homenetmen Beirut	Undisclosed	

=== Released ===
Date	Position	Nationality	Name	Joined	Date	Ref.
24 October 2018	MF	(United States)	Pablo Cruz	Las Vegas Lights	9 January 2019	
24 October 2018	FW	(United States)	Eder Arreola	Orange County	18 April 2019	
21 December 2018	DF	(Gabon)	Henri Junior Ndong	Al-Ahly		
21 December 2018	MF	(Mali)	Moussa Diakité	Botoșani	10 January 2019	
21 December 2018	FW	(Democratic Republic of the Congo)	Kadima Kabangu	Motema Pembe		
21 December 2018	FW	(Russia)	Georgy Gogichayev	Kuban-Holding Pavlovskaya		
11 January 2019	FW	(Ivory Coast)	Jean-Jacques Bougouhi	Ararat-Armenia	17 January 2019	
30 June 2019	DF	(Armenia)	Mher Safaryan			
30 June 2019	DF	(Armenia)	Aram Shakhnazaryan	Alashkert	5 July 2019	
30 June 2019	MF	(Armenia)	David Ghandilyan	Alashkert	11 August 2019	
30 June 2019	MF	(Armenia)	Khoren Veranyan	Torpedo Yerevan	7 July 2019	
30 June 2019	MF	(North Macedonia)	Fatjon Jusufi	Shkupi	1 July 2019	
30 June 2019	FW	(North Macedonia)	Bunjamin Shabani	Drita	15 July 2019	

== Competitions ==
=== Premier League ===
==== Results summary ====
Overall								Home						Away					
Pld	W	D	L	GF	GA	GD	Pts	W	D	L	GF	GA	GD	W	D	L	GF	GA	GD
32	7	15	10	26	30	−4	36	5	8	3	13	7	+6	2	7	7	13	23	−10

Last updated: 30 May 2019.
Source: See Results

==== Results ====
4 August 2018 1	Banants	0 – 0	Shirak	Yerevan
17:00 (UTC+4)	Jovanović (yellow card) 16'; H. Hakobyan (yellow card) 57'; V.Ayvazyan (yellow card) 66'; Asamoah 86'	Report	K.Veranyan (yellow card) 85'; R.Mkrtchyan (yellow card) 90+2'	Stadium: Banants Stadium; Attendance: 500; Referee: Artur Simonyan

12 August 2018 2	Shirak	1 – 1	Lori	Gyumri
17:00 (UTC+4)	Cruz 43'; Mikaelyan (yellow card) 48'; A.Shakhnazaryan (yellow card) 79'; Arreola (yellow card) 82'	Report	I.Fuseni (yellow card) 53'; Désiré (yellow card) 79'; U.Etop 85' (yellow card) 90'	Stadium: Gyumri City Stadium; Attendance: 500; Referee: Zaven Hovhannisyan

19 August 2018 3	Ararat Yerevan	0 – 0	Shirak	Yerevan
16:30 (UTC+4)	G.Poghosyan (yellow card) 29'; R.Safaryan (yellow card) 72'; D.Zakharyan (yellow card) 85'	Report	A.Muradyan (yellow card) 45+1'; R.Mkrtchyan (yellow card) 77'	Stadium: Alashkert Stadium; Attendance: 300; Referee: Henrik Nalbandyan

22 August 2018 4	Shirak	1 – 2	Pyunik	Gyumri
17:00 (UTC+4)	Arreola 2'; Z.Margaryan (yellow card) 21'	Report	Vardanyan 46'; Konaté 64'; R.Hakobyan (yellow card) 72'; Kolychev (yellow card) 90+3'	Stadium: Gyumri City Stadium; Attendance: 700; Referee: Artur Safaryan

25 August 2018 5	Gandzasar Kapan	1 – 1	Shirak	Yerevan
18:00 (UTC+4)	Meliksetyan (red card) 44'; G.Nranyan 78'	Report	R.Mkrtchyan 45+3'	Stadium: Football Academy Stadium; Attendance: 150; Referee: Zaven Hovhannisyan

29 August 2018 6	Shirak	0 – 0	Alashkert	Gyumri
14:00 (UTC+4)	R.Misakyan (yellow card) 73'	Report	Jefferson (yellow card) 78'	Stadium: Gyumri City Stadium; Attendance: 400; Referee: Suren Baliyan

1 September 2018 7	Ararat-Armenia	3 – 1	Shirak	Yerevan
19:00 (UTC+4)	A.Davoyan 2' (o.g.); Pustozyorov (yellow card) 29'; Dimitrov 53', 66'; Martínez (yellow card) 75'	Report	A.Muradyan 15'; Z.Margaryan (yellow card) 21'; Shabani (yellow card) 75'; Diakité (yellow card) 84'; Arreola (yellow card) 90+2'	Stadium: Yerevan Football Academy Stadium; Attendance: 600; Referee: Artur Simonyan

23 September 2018 8	Shirak	3 – 0	Artsakh	Gyumri
16:00 (UTC+4)	K.Muradyan (yellow card) 11'; Cruz 18'; Ndong 20'; Kabangu 30' (yellow card) 55'	Report		Stadium: Gyumri City Stadium; Attendance: 400; Referee: Gevorg Eghoyan

29 September 2018 10	Shirak	0 – 0	Banants	Gyumri
14:00 (UTC+4)		Report	V.Ayvazyan (yellow card) 19'; H. Hakobyan (yellow card) 41'; Jovanović (red card) 85'	Stadium: Gyumri City Stadium; Attendance: 600; Referee: Zaven Hovhannisyan

7 October 2018 11	Lori	3 – 1	Shirak	Vanadzor
14:00 (UTC+4)	A.Khachaturov 12' (yellow card) 77'; Ingbede 60'; Désiré 71' (pen.)	Report	Bougouhi (yellow card) 40'; A.Muradyan 81'; A.Shakhnazaryan (yellow card) 85'; Bakayoko (yellow card) 90+1'	Stadium: Vanadzor Football Academy; Attendance: 600; Referee: Gevorg Eghoyan

20 October 2018 12	Shirak	1 – 0	Ararat Yerevan	Gyumri
15:00 (UTC+4)	Gogichayev 25'; A.Shakhnazaryan (yellow card) 73'; Mikaelyan (yellow card) 79'; Shabani (yellow card) 79'	Report	A.Trajkoski (yellow card) 23'; R.Safaryan (yellow card) 43'	Stadium: Gyumri City Stadium; Attendance: 300; Referee: Suren Baliyan

28 October 2018 13	Pyunik	1 – 1	Shirak	Yerevan
18:00 (UTC+4)	A.Arakelyan (yellow card) 34'; Dmitriyev (yellow card) 62'; Kolychev (yellow card) 70'; Zhestokov 90+2'	Report	Bakayoko 15'	Stadium: Vazgen Sargsyan Republican Stadium; Attendance: 150; Referee: Gevorg Eghoyan

31 October 2018 14	Shirak	2 – 0	Gandzasar Kapan	Gyumri
15:00 (UTC+4)	Wbeymar 12' (o.g.); Bougouhi (yellow card) 28'; Mikaelyan 34'; R.Mkrtchyan (yellow card) 44'	Report	M.Manasyan (yellow card) 75'	Stadium: Gyumri City Stadium; Attendance: 200; Referee: Artur Safaryan

3 November 2018 15	Alashkert	1 – 0	Shirak	Yerevan
15:00 (UTC+4)	Arta.Yedigaryan 90+2'	Report	Bougouhi (yellow card) 33'; Bakayoko (yellow card) 71'	Stadium: Alashkert Stadium; Attendance: 200; Referee: Artur Simonyan

11 November 2018 16	Shirak	1 – 0	Ararat-Armenia	Gyumri
14:00 (UTC+4)	A.Muradyan (yellow card) 52'; A.Davoyan (yellow card) 55'; Kabangu 78' (yellow card) 78'	Report	Khozin (yellow card) 25'; Martínez (yellow card) 74'	Stadium: Gyumri City Stadium; Attendance: 800; Referee: Suren Baliyan

28 November 2018 18	Artsakh	0 – 1	Shirak	Yerevan
14:00 (UTC+4)	H.Hambardzumyan (yellow card) 36'; Baloyan (yellow card) 40'; Minasyan (red card) 57'	Report	A.Shakhnazaryan (yellow card) 20'; A.Muradyan (yellow card) 25'; Bougouhi 75' (pen.)	Stadium: Mika Stadium; Attendance: 100; Referee: Artur Simonyan

1 December 2018 19	Banants	4 – 0	Shirak	Yerevan
14:00 (UTC+4)	Wal 12', 74'; Jovanović (yellow card) 26'; Udo 60'; Solovyov (yellow card) 78'; A.Amiryan 89' (o.g.)	Report		Stadium: Banants-4 Stadium; Attendance: 100; Referee: Suren Baliyan

3 March 2018 20	Shirak	0 – 0	Lori	Gyumri
14:00 (UTC+4)	Shabani (yellow card) 70'	Report		Stadium: Gyumri Football Academy; Attendance: 150; Referee: Artur Simonyan

6 March 2019 21	Ararat Yerevan	0 – 2	Shirak	Yerevan
15:00 (UTC+4)	G.Poghosyan (yellow card) 75'	Report	K.Ntika 16' (o.g.); Bakayoko 48' (pen.); D.Ghandilyan (yellow card) 51'	Stadium: Banants Artificial Field; Attendance: 300; Referee: Suren Baliyan

10 March 2019 22	Shirak	0 – 2	Pyunik	Gyumri
15:00 (UTC+4)	Prljević (yellow card) 73'	Report	Miranyan (yellow card) 75'; Vardanyan 78'; Trusevych (yellow card) 86'; Shevchuk 87'	Stadium: Gyumri City Stadium; Attendance: 300; Referee: Gevorg Eghoyan

15 March 2019 23	Gandzasar Kapan	0 – 0	Shirak	Yerevan
16:00 (UTC+4)	H.Asoyan (yellow card) 36'	Report	R.Misakyan (yellow card) 40'	Stadium: Yerevan Football Academy Stadium; Attendance: 300; Referee: Zaven Hovhannisyan

30 March 2019 24	Shirak	1 – 1	Alashkert	Gyumri
14:00 (UTC+4)	A.Aslanyan (yellow card) 30'; A.Muradyan 68' (yellow card) 75'	Report	Artu.Yedigaryan 10'; Prudnikov (yellow card) 46'; Tankov (yellow card) 89'	Stadium: Gyumri City Stadium; Attendance: 100; Referee: Suren Baliyan

8 April 2019 25	Ararat-Armenia	2 – 2	Shirak	Yerevan
14:00 (UTC+4)	Bougouhi (yellow card) 35'; Kódjo (yellow card) 73'; Avetisyan 80' (yellow card) 86'; Martínez (yellow card) 80'; Guz 85'; Malakyan (yellow card) 89'	Report	Shabani 70'; D.Ghandilyan 81'; R.Mkrtchyan (yellow card) 83'; A.Tsaturyan (yellow card) 86'	Stadium: Yerevan Football Academy Stadium; Attendance: 400; Referee: Gevorg Eghoyan

15 April 2019 27	Shirak	0 – 0	Artsakh	Gyumri
16:00 (UTC+4)	A.Gevorkyan (yellow card) 46'; Muradyan (yellow card) 56'; A.Davoyan (yellow card) 80'	Report	H.Nazaryan (yellow card) 43'; Gareginyan (yellow card) 80'	Stadium: Gyumri City Stadium; Attendance: 300; Referee: Henrik Nalbandyan

19 April 2019 28	Shirak	0 – 0	Banants	Gyumri
16:00 (UTC+4)	Mikaelyan (yellow card) 19'; Z.Margaryan (yellow card) 67'; A.Davoyan (yellow card) 90+2'	Report	N.Petrosyan (yellow card) 78'	Stadium: Gyumri City Stadium; Attendance: 100; Referee: Zaven Hovhannisyan

28 April 2019 29	Lori	2 – 2	Shirak	Vanadzor
15:00 (UTC+4)	Désiré 32'; Ingbede (yellow card) 33'; Aliyu 58' (yellow card) 73'	Report	K.Muradyan (yellow card) 26'; Bakayoko 34'; A.Aslanyan (yellow card) 50'; A.Gevorkyan (yellow card) 82'; K.Veranyan (yellow card) 89'; Mikaelyan 90+3'	Stadium: Vanadzor Football Academy; Attendance: 500; Referee: Suren Baliyan

2 May 2019 30	Shirak	3 – 0	Ararat Yerevan	Gyumri
16:00 (UTC+4)	Bakayoko 53'; Gevorkyan (yellow card) 58' (goal) 62'; A.Muradyan 72'	Report	M.Guyganov (yellow card) 6'	Stadium: Gyumri City Stadium; Attendance: 400; Referee: Ashot Ghaltakchyan

5 May 2019 31	Pyunik	2 – 0	Shirak	Vagharshapat
16:00 (UTC+4)	Zhestokov 5'; Dao (yellow card) 48'; Mkrtchyan (yellow card) 68'; Marku (yellow card) 83'; Miranyan 89'	Report	A.Muradyan (yellow card) 43'	Stadium: Fut Akademia; Attendance: 300; Referee: Henrik Nalbandyan

11 May 2019 32	Shirak	0 – 0	Gandzasar Kapan	Gyumri
15:00 (UTC+4)		Report	Harutyunyan (yellow card) 90+2'	Stadium: Gyumri City Stadium; Attendance: 300; Referee: Artur Safaryan

15 May 2019 33	Alashkert	1 – 0	Shirak	Yerevan
17:00 (UTC+4)	Antonić (yellow card) 9'; Daghbashyan (yellow card) 50'; Arta.Yedigaryan (yellow card) 65'; Marmentini 73' (yellow card) 73'; Avagyan (yellow card) 90'	Report	Shabani (yellow card) 65'; A.Aslanyan (yellow card) 90'	Stadium: Alashkert Stadium; Attendance: 500; Referee: Ashot Ghaltakchyan

19 May 2019 34	Shirak	0 – 1	Ararat-Armenia	Gyumri
15:00 (UTC+4)	R.Mkrtchyan (yellow card) 90+4'	Report	Kódjo 8'	Stadium: Gyumri City Stadium; Attendance: 200; Referee: Zaven Hovhannisyan

30 May 2019 36	Artsakh	3 – 2	Shirak	Yerevan
17:00 (UTC+4)	Gareginyan 7' (pen.), 66' (yellow card) 38'; H.Nazaryan (yellow card) 20'; V.Movsisyan (red card) 41'; V.Avetisyan 75'; A.Petrosyan (yellow card) 78'; A.Meliksetyan (yellow card) 90+2'	Report	K.Muradyan 72'; F.Jusufi 90'; A.Davoyan (yellow card) 90+5'	Stadium: Mika Stadium; Attendance: 300; Referee: Ashot Ghaltakchyan

==== Table ====
Pos	Team	Pld	W	D	L	GF	GA	GD	Pts	Qualification or relegation
1	Ararat-Armenia (C)	32	18	7	7	53	28	+25	61	Qualification for the Champions League first qualifying round
2	Pyunik	32	18	6	8	46	32	+14	60	Qualification for the Europa League first qualifying round (Note: Alashkert qualified for the Europa League first qualifying round by winning the 2018–19 Armenian Cup.)
3	Banants	32	14	10	8	43	35	+8	52	Qualification for the Europa League first qualifying round
4	Alashkert	32	15	6	11	37	27	+10	51	Qualification for the Europa League first qualifying round
5	Lori	32	11	11	10	42	40	+2	44	
6	Gandzasar	32	10	8	14	38	33	+5	38	
7	Shirak	32	7	15	10	26	30	−4	36	
8	Artsakh	32	6	10	16	25	49	−24	28	
9	Ararat Yerevan	32	5	7	20	24	60	−36	22	

Source: Soccerway
Rules for classification: 1) Points; 2) Play-off (only if deciding champion); 3) Matches won; 4) Head-to-head points; 5) Head-to-head matches won; 6) Head-to-head goal difference; 7) Head-to-head goals scored; 8) Head-to-head away goals scored; 9) Goal difference; 10) Goals scored.
(C) Champions

=== Armenian Cup ===
20 September 2018 First Round 1st leg	Artsakh	0 – 0	Shirak	Yerevan
16:00 (UTC+4)	Gareginyan (yellow card) 30'; O.Tupchiyenko (yellow card) 58'; A.Petrosyan (yellow card) 87'	Report		Stadium: Mika Stadium; Attendance: 100; Referee: Artur Safaryan

4 October 2018 First Round 2nd leg	Shirak	1 – 3 (1 – 3 agg.)	Artsakh	Gyumri
14:00 (UTC+4)	Ndong 13'	Report	O.Tupchiyenko (yellow card) 38'; E.Yeghiazaryan 48'; G.Aghekyan 69'; H.Nazaryan (yellow card) 71'; Baloyan 77'	Stadium: Gyumri City Stadium; Attendance: 150; Referee: Artur Safaryan

== Statistics ==
As of match played 30 May 2019

=== Appearances and goals ===
No.	Pos	Nat	Player	Total		Premier League		Armenian Cup	
No.	Pos	Nat	Player	Apps	Goals	Apps	Goals	Apps	Goals
1	GK	(Armenia) ARM	Sokrat Hovhannisyan	1	0	1	0	0	0
3	DF	(Armenia) ARM	Aram Shakhnazaryan	26	0	24	0	1+1	0
4	DF	(Armenia) ARM	Artyom Mikaelyan	29	2	26+1	2	2	0
5	FW	(Russia) RUS	Artyom Gevorkyan	13	1	7+6	1	0	0
6	DF	(Serbia) SRB	Marko Prljević	15	0	15	0	0	0
7	MF	(Armenia) ARM	Arman Aslanyan	27	0	13+14	0	0	0
8	DF	(Armenia) ARM	Zhirayr Margaryan	34	0	32	0	2	0
9	FW	(Armenia) ARM	Aram Muradyan	26	4	13+11	4	2	0
10	MF	(Armenia) ARM	Khoren Veranyan	23	0	14+7	0	1+1	0
11	MF	(Armenia) ARM	David Ghandilyan	15	1	10+5	1	0	0
17	FW	(Armenia) ARM	Arlen Tsaturyan	8	0	1+7	0	0	0
18	MF	(Armenia) ARM	Rafik Misakyan	18	0	9+8	0	1	0
19	MF	(Armenia) ARM	Karen Muradyan	25	1	24	1	1	0
20	MF	(Armenia) ARM	Rudik Mkrtchyan	26	1	19+5	1	2	0
22	FW	(North Macedonia) MKD	Bunjamin Shabani	26	1	19+6	1	1	0
25	DF	(Armenia) ARM	Aghvan Davoyan	31	0	30	0	1	0
40	DF	(Armenia) ARM	Artur Amiryan	1	0	1	0	0	0
41	MF	(North Macedonia) MKD	Fatjon Jusufi	2	1	1+1	1	0	0
44	MF	(Armenia) ARM	Levon Darbinyan	1	0	0+1	0	0	0
45	GK	(Russia) RUS	Vsevolod Yermakov	33	0	31	0	2	0
88	MF	(Ivory Coast) CIV	Moussa Bakayoko	23	4	18+4	4	1	0
Players who left Shirak during the season:
2	FW	(Ivory Coast) CIV	Jean-Jacques Bougouhi	12	1	7+3	1	1+1	0
11	MF	(United States) USA	Pablo Cruz	12	2	7+3	2	0+2	0
13	FW	(United States) USA	Eder Arreola	11	1	9+1	1	1	0
15	FW	(Russia) RUS	Georgy Gogichayev	9	1	5+3	1	1	0
38	MF	(Mali) MLI	Moussa Diakité	9	0	8	0	1	0
58	DF	(Gabon) GAB	Henri Junior Ndong	3	2	2	1	1	1
99	FW	(Democratic Republic of the Congo) COD	Kadima Kabangu	16	2	6+9	2	0+1	0

=== Goal scorers ===
Place	Position	Nation	Number	Name	Premier League	Armenian Cup	Total
1	MF	(Ivory Coast)	88	Moussa Bakayoko	4	0	4
1	FW	(Armenia)	9	Aram Muradyan	4	0	4
4	MF	(United States)	11	Pablo Cruz	2	0	2
4	FW	(Democratic Republic of the Congo)	99	Kadima Kabangu	2	0	2
4	MF	(Armenia)	4	Artyom Mikaelyan	2	0	2
4	DF	(Gabon)	58	Henri Junior Ndong	1	1	2
4				Own goal	2	0	2
8	MF	(United States)	13	Eder Arreola	1	0	1
8	MF	(Armenia)	20	Rudik Mkrtchyan	1	0	1
8	FW	(Russia)	15	Georgy Gogichayev	1	0	1
8	FW	(Ivory Coast)	2	Jean-Jacques Bougouhi	1	0	1
8	MF	(North Macedonia)	22	Bunjamin Shabani	1	0	1
8	MF	(Armenia)	11	David Ghandilyan	1	0	1
8	FW	(Russia)	5	Artyom Gevorkyan	1	0	1
8	MF	(Armenia)	19	Karen Muradyan	1	0	1
8	MF	(North Macedonia)	41	Fatjon Jusufi	1	0	1
				TOTALS	26	1	27

=== Clean sheets ===
Place	Position	Nation	Number	Name	Premier League	Armenian Cup	Total
1	GK	(Russia)	45	Vsevolod Yermakov	16	1	17
				TOTALS	16	1	17

=== Disciplinary record ===
Number	Nation	Position	Name	Premier League		Armenian Cup		Total	
Number	Nation	Position	Name	Booked	Sent off (straight red)	Booked	Sent off (straight red)	Booked	Sent off (straight red)
3	(Armenia)	DF	Aram Shakhnazaryan	4	0	0	0	4	0
4	(Armenia)	DF	Artyom Mikaelyan	3	0	0	0	3	0
5	(Russia)	FW	Artyom Gevorkyan	3	0	0	0	3	0
6	(Serbia)	DF	Marko Prljević	1	0	0	0	1	0
7	(Armenia)	MF	Arman Aslanyan	3	0	0	0	3	0
8	(Armenia)	DF	Zhirayr Margaryan	3	0	0	0	3	0
9	(Armenia)	FW	Aram Muradyan	5	0	0	0	5	0
10	(Armenia)	MF	Khoren Veranyan	2	0	0	0	2	0
11	(Armenia)	MF	David Ghandilyan	1	0	0	0	1	0
17	(Armenia)	FW	Arlen Tsaturyan	1	0	0	0	1	0
18	(Armenia)	MF	Rafik Misakyan	3	0	0	0	3	0
19	(Armenia)	MF	Karen Muradyan	3	0	0	0	3	0
20	(Armenia)	MF	Rudik Mkrtchyan	4	0	0	0	4	0
22	(North Macedonia)	FW	Bunjamin Shabani	4	0	0	0	4	0
25	(Armenia)	MF	Aghvan Davoyan	4	0	0	0	4	0
88	(Ivory Coast)	MF	Moussa Bakayoko	2	0	0	0	2	0
Players who left Shirak during the season:
2	(Ivory Coast)	FW	Jean-Jacques Bougouhi	3	0	0	0	3	0
13	(United States)	FW	Eder Arreola	2	0	0	0	2	0
38	(Mali)	MF	Moussa Diakité	1	0	0	0	1	0
99	(Democratic Republic of the Congo)	FW	Kadima Kabangu	2	0	0	0	2	0
			TOTALS	54	0	0	0	54	0
