= 2017–18 FC Shirak season =

Shirak
2017-18 season
- Chairman: Arman Sahakyan
- Manager: Vardan Bichakhchyan
- Stadium: Gyumri City Stadium
- Premier League: 4th
- Armenian Cup: Semifinal vs Gandzasar Kapan
- Europa League: First qualifying round vs Gorica
- Top goalscorer: League: Moussa Bakayoko (7); All: Moussa Bakayoko (11)
- Highest home attendance: 2,100 vs Gorica (29 June 2017)
- Lowest home attendance: 0 vs Banants (5 November 2017)
- Average home league attendance: 604 (9 May 2018)

The 2017–18 season was Shirak's 27th consecutive season in the Armenian Premier League. Shirak finished the season in 4th place after they were deducted 12 points in May 2018 as it was alleged that Shirak's sporting director Ararat Harutyunyan had offered Edward Kpodo of Banants a bride to fix their upcoming match. Shirak were knocked out of the Armenian Cup by Gandzasar Kapan at the Semifinal stage and the Europa League by Gorica in the first qualifying round.

== Squad ==
As of match played 12 May 2018

No.	Name	Nationality	Position	Date of birth (age)	Signed from	Signed in	Contract ends	Apps.	Goals
Goalkeepers
1	Sokrat Hovhannisyan	(Armenia)	GK	5 April 1996 (aged 22)	Youth team	2016		0	0
13	Anatoliy Ayvazov	(Armenia)	GK	8 June 1996 (aged 21)	Pyunik	2016		68	0
	Ferdinand Muradyan	(Armenia)	GK	29 October 1999 (aged 18)	Youth team	2017		0	0
Defenders
3	Artyom Mikaelyan	(Armenia)	DF	12 July 1991 (aged 26)	Youth team	2010		100	1
6	Marko Prljević	(Serbia)	DF	2 August 1988 (aged 29)	Proleter Novi Sad	2018		23	1
7	Hrayr Mkoyan	(Armenia)	DF	2 September 1986 (aged 31)	Esteghlal	2018			
20	Zhirayr Margaryan	(Armenia)	DF	13 September 1997 (aged 20)	Banants	2018		15	1
23	Robert Darbinyan	(Armenia)	DF	1 June 1990 (aged 27)		2016		81	1
25	Aghvan Davoyan	(Armenia)	DF	21 March 1990 (aged 28)	Youth team	2010			
40	Artur Amiryan	(Armenia)	DF	6 July 1997 (aged 20)	Youth team	2017		6	0
43	Styopa Gevorgyan	(Armenia)	DF	30 September 1999 (aged 18)	Youth team	2017		1	0
44	Hakob Vardanyan	(Armenia)	DF	1 June 1999 (aged 18)	Youth team	2017		0	0
	Armen Darbinyan	(Armenia)	DF	30 August 1999 (aged 18)	Youth team	2017		0	0
Midfielders
16	Arman Aslanyan	(Armenia)	MF	30 January 1994 (aged 24)	Youth team	2013		10	0
18	Rafik Misakyan	(Armenia)	MF	2 January 2000 (aged 18)	Banants	2018		2	0
19	Solomon Udo	(Nigeria)	MF	15 July 1995 (aged 22)	Ulisses	2016		80	6
22	Igor Stanojević	(Serbia)	MF	24 October 1991 (aged 26)	Zemun	2017		34	6
28	Mohamed Kaba	(Ivory Coast)	MF	5 April 1989 (aged 29)	Al Ahli	2015		89	6
37	Rudik Mkrtchyan	(Armenia)	MF	26 October 1998 (aged 19)	Youth team	2016		19	0
41	Mher Safaryan	(Armenia)	MF	10 October 1997 (aged 20)	Youth team	2017		7	0
42	Martun Mkhitaryan	(Armenia)	MF	9 November 1997 (aged 20)	Youth team	2018		11	1
88	Moussa Bakayoko	(Ivory Coast)	MF	27 December 1996 (aged 21)	Raja Casablanca	2017		48	13
	Karapet Harutyunyan	(Armenia)	MF	5 January 2001 (aged 17)	Youth team	2017		0	0
	Artush Mirzakhanyan	(Armenia)	MF	30 September 1998 (aged 19)	Youth team	2016		1	0
	Gagik Poghosyan	(Armenia)	MF	4 May 1993 (aged 25)	Virgen del Camino	2017		0	0
Forwards
9	Aram Muradyan	(Armenia)	FW	14 April 1995 (aged 23)	Youth Team	2013		101	9
10	Vardan Bakalyan	(Armenia)	FW	4 April 1995 (aged 23)	Gandzasar Kapan	2017		33	5
14	David Ghandilyan	(Armenia)	FW	4 June 1993 (aged 24)	Deren	2018		15	1
17	Arlen Tsaturyan	(Armenia)	FW	5 January 1999 (aged 19)	Youth Team	2016		10	0
27	Aram Tosunyan	(Armenia)	FW	29 May 1993 (aged 24)	Youth team	2011			
35	Yoro Lamine Ly	(Senegal)	FW	27 August 1988 (aged 29)		2018		87	24
39	Levon Mryan	(Armenia)	FW	11 May 2000 (aged 18)	Youth team	2017		0	0
Players out on loan
Players who left during the season
5	Edward Kpodo	(Ghana)	DF	14 January 1990 (aged 28)	Gandzasar Kapan	2017		18	0
8	Ghukas Poghosyan	(Armenia)	MF	6 February 1994 (aged 24)		2016		23	3
7	Aleksandar Ilić	(Bosnia and Herzegovina)	FW	8 April 1994 (aged 24)	Bregalnica Štip	2017		20	2
10	Kyrian Nwabueze	(Nigeria)	FW	11 December 1992 (aged 24)		2017		14	3
17	Vahan Bichakhchyan	(Armenia)	MF	9 July 1999 (aged 17)	Youth team	2015		30	6
20	Oumarou Kaina	(Cameroon)	MF	16 October 1996 (aged 21)		2017		14	1
45	Vsevolod Yermakov	(Russia)	GK	6 January 1996 (aged 22)		2015		10	0

== Transfers ==
=== In ===
Date	Position	Nationality	Name	From	Fee	Ref.
1 July 2017	DF	(Ghana)	Edward Kpodo	Gandzasar Kapan	Undisclosed	
1 July 2017	MF	(Serbia)	Igor Stanojević	Zemun	Undisclosed	
1 July 2017	MF	(Armenia)	Gagik Poghosyan	Virgen del Camino	Undisclosed	
1 July 2017	FW	(Bosnia and Herzegovina)	Aleksandar Ilić	Bregalnica Štip	Undisclosed	
1 August 2017	FW	(Armenia)	Vardan Bakalyan	Bregalnica Štip	Undisclosed	
30 January 2018	DF	(Armenia)	Hrayr Mkoyan	Esteghlal	Undisclosed	
10 February 2018	DF	(Armenia)	Zhirayr Margaryan	Banants	Undisclosed	
10 February 2018	DF	(Serbia)	Marko Prljevic	Proleter Novi Sad	Undisclosed	
10 February 2018	MF	(Armenia)	Rafik Misakyan	Banants	Undisclosed	
10 February 2018	FW	(Armenia)	David Ghandilyan	Deren	Undisclosed	
1 March 2018	FW	(Senegal)	Yoro Lamine Ly		Free	

=== Out ===
Date	Position	Nationality	Name	From	Fee	Ref.
24 July 2017	MF	(Armenia)	Vahan Bichakhchyan	Žilina	Undisclosed	
5 August 2017	DF	(Ukraine)	Semen Datsenko	Mosta	Undisclosed	
7 February 2018	FW	(Bosnia and Herzegovina)	Aleksandar Ilić	Vitez	Undisclosed	
23 February 2018	DF	(Ghana)	Edward Kpodo	Banants	Undisclosed	

=== Released ===
Date	Position	Nationality	Name	Joined	Date
1 August 2017	GK	(Russia)	Vsevolod Yermakov	Zenit-Izhevsk	
1 August 2017	DF	(Serbia)	Marko Prljević	Proleter Novi Sad	25 August 2017
1 August 2017	MF	(Cameroon)	Oumarou Kaina	Al-Talaba	1 January 2018
1 August 2017	FW	(Nigeria)	Kyrian Nwabueze	Gorica	15 September 2017
13 June 2018	MF	(Nigeria)	Solomon Udo	Banants	13 June 2018
15 June 2018	MF	(Serbia)	Igor Stanojević	Banants	15 June 2018
20 June 2018	GK	(Armenia)	Anatoliy Ayvazov	Banants	20 June 2018
30 June 2018	DF	(Armenia)	Robert Darbinyan	Ararat-Armenia	2 July 2018
30 June 2018	DF	(Armenia)	Hrayr Mkoyan	Ararat-Armenia	2 July 218
30 June 2018	DF	(Serbia)	Marko Prljević	Tsarsko Selo Sofia	5 July 2018
30 June 2018	MF	(Armenia)	Martun Mkhitaryan		
30 June 2018	MF	(Armenia)	Gagik Poghosyan	Virgen del Camino	1 July 2018
30 June 2018	MF	(Ivory Coast)	Mohamed Kaba		
30 June 2018	MF	(Ivory Coast)	Moussa Bakayoko	Shirak	1 September 2018
30 June 2018	FW	(Armenia)	Vardan Bakalyan	Ararat-Armenia	2 July 2018
30 June 2018	FW	(Senegal)	Yoro Lamine Ly		

== Competitions ==
=== Armenian Supercup ===
24 September 2017	Alashkert	0 – 2	Shirak	Yerevan
19:30 (UTC+4)	Grigoryan (yellow card) 30'; Minasyan (yellow card) 55'; Voskanyan (yellow card) 59'	Report	M.Kaba (yellow card) 28'; A.Davoyan (yellow card) 59'; Darbinyan (yellow card) 65'; Bakayoko 80'; M.Mkhitaryan 90'	Stadium: Vazgen Sargsyan Republican Stadium; Attendance: 2,000; Referee: Suren Baliyan

=== Premier League ===
==== Results summary ====
Overall								Home						Away					
Pld	W	D	L	GF	GA	GD	Pts	W	D	L	GF	GA	GD	W	D	L	GF	GA	GD
30	14	8	8	37	31	+6	50	8	3	4	16	11	+5	6	5	4	21	20	+1

Last updated: 20 May 2018.
Source: See Results

==== Results ====
4 August 2017 1	Shirak	2 – 1	Alashkert	Gyumri
17:30 (UTC+4)	Mikaelyan 45+1' (yellow card) 85'; A.Muradyan 55' (yellow card) 58'; R.Mkrtchyan (yellow card) 55'; Stanojević (yellow card) 90+5'	Report	M.Manasyan 28'; A.Beglaryan (yellow card) 66'; Yedigaryan (yellow card) 88'	Stadium: Gyumri City Stadium; Attendance: 800; Referee: Zaven Hovhannisyan

13 August 2017 2	Shirak	1 – 0	Banants	Gyumri
17:30 (UTC+4)	V.Bakalyan 9'; A.Davoyan (yellow card) 39'; A.Ayvazov (yellow card) 90+4'	Report	Injac (yellow card) 39'; Krasić (yellow card) 51'	Stadium: Gyumri City Stadium; Attendance: 500; Referee: Artur Safaryan

19 August 2017 3	Gandzasar Kapan	0 – 1	Shirak	Yerevan
19:00 (UTC+4)	A.Yakovtsev (yellow card) 39'; V.Minasyan (yellow card) 63'; Memović (yellow card) 81'; Musonda (yellow card) 90+1'	Report	Mikaelyan (yellow card) 76'; Ilić 80'; Darbinyan (yellow card) 87'; Stanojević (yellow card) 90+1'	Stadium: Vazgen Sargsyan Republican Stadium; Attendance: 300; Referee: Suren Baliyan

26 August 2017 4	Shirak	2 – 1	Ararat Yerevan	Gyumri
17:00 (UTC+4)	Udo 45'; M.Kaba (yellow card) 55'; Mikaelyan (yellow card) 64'; Kpodo (yellow card) 66'; Ilić 87'	Report	V.Arzoyan (yellow card) 15'; R.Yeghiazaryan 51'; S.Mkrtchyan (yellow card) 54'	Stadium: Gyumri City Stadium; Attendance: 300; Referee: Artur Safaryan

10 September 2017 5	Pyunik	0 – 2	Shirak	Yerevan
18:00 (UTC+4)	A.Shakhnazaryan (yellow card) 4'	Report	Udo (yellow card) 20'; Bakayoko 44'; Stanojević 75'; Mikaelyan (yellow card) 88'	Stadium: Vazgen Sargsyan Republican Stadium; Attendance: 500; Referee: Zaven Hovhannisyan

16 September 2017 6	Alashkert	1 – 0	Shirak	Yerevan
16:00 (UTC+4)	Artem (yellow card) 35'; Nenadović 54'; Minasyan (yellow card) 68'; Voskanyan (yellow card) 69' (yellow-red card) 88'; Beglaryan (yellow card) 85'	Report	Darbinyan (yellow card) 4'; V.Bakalyan (yellow card) 31'; Mikaelyan (yellow card) 55'; A.Muradyan (yellow card) 69' (yellow-red card) 70'	Stadium: Alashkert Stadium; Attendance: 900; Referee: Zaven Hovhannisyan

27 September 2017 7	Banants	3 – 0	Shirak	Yerevan
16:00 (UTC+4)	Đoković 32'; V.Ayvazyan (yellow card) 48'; K.Sibo (yellow card) 60' (goal) 82'; A.Loretsyan (yellow card) 66'; M.Guydanov (yellow card) 68'; Gyozalyan 90'	Report	M.Safaryan (yellow card) 45'; Kpodo (yellow card) 47'	Stadium: Banants Stadium; Attendance: 300; Referee: Artur Simonyan

1 October 2017 8	Shirak	1 – 1	Gandzasar Kapan	Gyumri
16:00 (UTC+4)	Udo (yellow card) 59'; Bakayoko (yellow card) 59' (goal) 90+6' (pen.); M.Kaba (yellow card) 75'	Report	Yashin (yellow card) 41'; Wbeymar 46'; H.Ishkhanyan (yellow card) 59'; A.Azatyan (yellow card) 59'; A.Khachatryan (yellow card) 86'; G.Nranyan (yellow card) 90+4'	Stadium: Gyumri City Stadium; Attendance: 500; Referee: Suren Baliyan

13 October 2017 9	Ararat Yerevan	2 – 2	Shirak	Yerevan
15:00 (UTC+4)	R.Safaryan (yellow card) 30'; Ar.Kocharyan 44'; G. Kirakosyan 39'	Report	Stanojević 35' (pen.); A.Muradyan 39'; Mikaelyan (yellow card) 73'	Stadium: Mika Stadium; Attendance: 300; Referee: Gevorg Eghoyan

21 October 2017 10	Shirak	0 – 0	Pyunik	Gyumri
15:00 (UTC+4)	Darbinyan (yellow card) 20'; Udo (yellow card) 62'; M.Kaba (yellow card) 73'; Mikaelyan (yellow card) 76'; V.Bakalyan (yellow card) 90'; A.Ayvazov (yellow card) 90+5'	Report	Kadio (yellow card) 11' (yellow-red card) 50'; A.Kartashyan (yellow card) 24'; E.Vardanyan (yellow card) 65'	Stadium: Gyumri City Stadium; Attendance: 400; Referee: Gevorg Eghoyan

29 October 2017 11	Shirak	0 – 1	Alashkert	Gyumri
15:00 (UTC+4)	R.Mkrtchyan (yellow card) 51'; Bakayoko (yellow card) 56'	Report	Simonyan (yellow card) 61'; Peltier 88'	Stadium: Gyumri City Stadium; Attendance: 1,000; Referee: Suren Baliyan

5 November 2017 12	Shirak	0 – 1	Banants	Gyumri
15:00 (UTC+4)	A.Amiryan (yellow card) 22'; A.Davoyan (yellow card) 35'; A.Muradyan (yellow card) 77'	Report	N.Petrosyan (yellow card) 3'; Krasić (yellow card) 35'; Jovanović (yellow card) 38'; Walmerson 81'	Stadium: Gyumri City Stadium; Attendance: 0 Referee: Gevorg Eghoyan

18 November 2017 13	Gandzasar Kapan	2 – 2	Shirak	Yerevan
16:00 (UTC+4)	Yashin 37'; Musonda 46'; Wbeymar (yellow card) 57'; V.Minasyan (yellow card) 89'	Report	M.Kaba (yellow card) 44' (goal) 90'; Udo (yellow card) 58'; Stanojević (yellow card) 65'; A.Muradyan 69'	Stadium: Vazgen Sargsyan Republican Stadium; Attendance: 100; Referee: Suren Baliyan

25 November 2017 14	Shirak	0 – 1	Ararat Yerevan	Gyumri
15:00 (UTC+4)	A.Muradyan (yellow card) 49'	Report	An.Kocharyan 90+1'	Stadium: Gyumri City Stadium; Attendance: 120; Referee: Artur Safaryan

2 December 2017 15	Pyunik	3 – 2	Shirak	Yerevan
16:00 (UTC+4)	Vardanyan 10'; Avetisyan 37' (pen.); V.Hayrapetyan (yellow card) 31'; Kadio (yellow card) 71' (goal) 90+3'; A.Kartashyan (yellow card) 86'; Grigoryan (yellow card) 90+5'; N.Aslanyan (yellow card) 90+5'	Report	A.Ayvazov (yellow card) 37'; Mikaelyan (yellow card) 69'; M.Kaba (yellow card) 72'; A.Muradyan (yellow card) 75'; Udo 13', 68' (yellow card) 90+5'	Stadium: Vazgen Sargsyan Republican Stadium; Attendance: 800; Referee: Suren Baliyan

28 February 2018 16	Alashkert	0 – 1	Shirak	Yerevan
14:00 (UTC+4)	Nenadović (yellow card) 86'	Report	Stanojević 14'; Bakayoko (yellow card) 89'	Stadium: Alashkert Stadium; Attendance: 600; Referee: Zaven Hovhannisyan

4 March 2018 17	Banants	3 – 0	Shirak	Yerevan
14:00 (UTC+4)	Gyozalyan 19'; Hovsepyan 21'; K.Sibo (yellow card) 23' (goal) 89'	Report		Stadium: Banants Stadium; Attendance: 300; Referee: Zaven Hovhannisyan

10 March 2018 18	Shirak	2 – 1	Gandzasar Kapan	Gyumri
14:00 (UTC+4)	M.Kaba 56'; Bakayoko 80'	Report	G.Nranyan 7'; Živković (yellow card) 44'; Wbeymar (yellow card) 84'	Stadium: Gyumri City Stadium; Attendance: 600; Referee: Artur Simonyan

18 March 2018 19	Ararat Yerevan	0 – 2	Shirak	Yerevan
14:00 (UTC+4)	O.Hamvardzumyan (yellow card) 41'; V.Arzoyan (yellow card) 47'	Report	Udo 47' (pen.); V.Bakalyan 71'	Stadium: Alashkert Stadium; Attendance: 400; Referee: Suren Baliyan

31 March 2018 20	Shirak	2 – 0	Pyunik	Gyumri
15:00 (UTC+4)	V.Bakalyan 61'; Bakayoko 82'	Report	A.Kartashyan (yellow card) 16'; Mkrtchyan (yellow card) 42'	Stadium: Gyumri City Stadium; Attendance: 800; Referee: Zaven Hovhannisyan

4 April 2018 21	Shirak	1 – 0	Alashkert	Gyumri
15:00 (UTC+4)	M.Kaba (yellow card) 16'; D.Ghandilyan 90'	Report	B.Hovhannisyan (yellow card) 65'; Stojković (yellow card) 71'	Stadium: Gyumri City Stadium; Attendance: 600; Referee: Artur Simonyan

8 April 2018 22	Shirak	1 – 0	Banants	Gyumri
14:00 (UTC+4)	Stanojević 39' (yellow card) 51'; Udo (yellow card) 74'	Report	Kpodo (yellow card) 32'; H. Hakobyan (yellow card) 37'; Jovanović (yellow card) 45+2'	Stadium: Gyumri City Stadium; Attendance: 700; Referee: Zaven Hovhannisyan

14 April 2018 23	Gandzasar Kapan	1 – 1	Shirak	Yerevan
14:00 (UTC+4)	Musonda 54'	Report	Darbinyan (yellow card) 39'; Yashin 89' (o.g.)	Stadium: Banants Stadium; Attendance: 100; Referee: Zaven Hovhannisyan

21 April 2018 24	Shirak	4 – 1	Ararat Yerevan	Gyumri
17:00 (UTC+4)	A.Muradyan 9', 21'; A.Davoyan 33'; Ly (yellow card) 62'; V.Bakalyan (yellow card) 76'; Z.Margaryan 89'	Report	V.Chopuryan (yellow card) 26'; A.Petrosyan (yellow card) 58'; Gareginyan 68'; Dragojević (yellow card) 76'	Stadium: Gyumri City Stadium; Attendance: 350; Referee: Gevorg Eghoyan

29 April 2018 25	Pyunik	1 – 2	Shirak	Yerevan
16:00 (UTC+4)	H.Poghosyan 63'	Report	Stanojević 12'; Bakayoko 36'	Stadium: Vazgen Sargsyan Republican Stadium; Attendance: 500; Referee: Artur Simonyan

2 May 2018 26	Alashkert	0 – 0	Shirak	Yerevan
17:00 (UTC+4)	Simonyan (yellow card) 84'	Report	A.Davoyan (yellow card) 33'; A.Muradyan (yellow card) 56'	Stadium: Alashkert Stadium; Attendance: 250; Referee: Zaven Hovhannisyan

5 May 2018 27	Banants	0 – 2	Shirak	Yerevan
17:00 (UTC+4)	A.Hovhannisyan (yellow card) 42'; Peltier (yellow card) 53'; Ayrapetyan (yellow card) 87'	Report	Z.Margaryan (yellow card) 19'; Mkoyan (yellow card) 38'; Bakayoko (yellow card) 53' (goal) 64'; Udo 88'	Stadium: Banants Stadium; Attendance: 500; Referee: Suren Baliyan

9 May 2018 28	Shirak	0 – 0	Gandzasar Kapan	Gyumri
17:00 (UTC+4)	A.Davoyan (yellow card) 88'	Report	G.Nranyan (yellow card) 17'; A.Khachatryan (yellow card) 45'	Stadium: Gyumri City Stadium; Attendance: Artak Simonyan; Referee: 1,200

12 May 2018 29	Ararat Yerevan	4 – 4	Shirak	Yerevan
17:00 (UTC+4)	An.Kocharyan 43', 71'; D.Minasyan 54'; Darbinyan 61' (o.g.)	Report	Stanojević 5'; V.Bakalyan 7'; Bakayoko 19'; Prljević 27'; Z.Margaryan (yellow card) 82'	Stadium: Alashkert Stadium; Attendance: 300; Referee: Suren Baliyan

20 May 2018 30	Shirak	0 – 3	Pyunik	Gyumri
17:00 (UTC+4)		Report		Stadium: Gyumri City Stadium; Referee: Zaven Hovhannisyan
Note: Shirak refused to the play the match after being docked 12 points due to a fixing scandal.

==== Table ====
Pos	Team	Pld	W	D	L	GF	GA	GD	Pts	Qualification
1	Alashkert (C)	30	14	8	8	44	31	+13	50	Qualification for the Champions League first qualifying round
2	Banants	30	11	11	8	42	34	+8	44	Qualification for the Europa League first qualifying round (Note: Gandzasar Kapan qualified for the Europa League first qualifying round by winning the 2017–18 Armenian Cup.)
3	Gandzasar Kapan	30	11	10	9	43	34	+9	43	Qualification for the Europa League first qualifying round
4	Shirak	30	14	8	8	37	31	+6	38 (Note: Shirak were deducted 12 points on decision of Disciplinary Committee, upheld on May 18, due to match fixing scandal.)	
5	Pyunik	30	9	9	12	37	41	−4	36	Qualification for the Europa League first qualifying round
6	Ararat Yerevan	30	5	6	19	33	65	−32	21	

Source: Soccerway
Rules for classification: 1) Points; 2) Play-off (only if deciding champion); 3) Matches won; 4) Head-to-head points; 5) Head-to-head matches won; 6) Head-to-head goal difference; 7) Head-to-head goals scored; 8) Head-to-head away goals scored; 9) Goal difference; 10) Goals scored.
(C) Champions

=== Armenian Cup ===
13 September 2017 Quarterfinal 1st leg	Shirak	1 – 1	Ararat Yerevan	Gyumri
16:00 (UTC+4)	Bakayoko 12'; A.Amiryan (yellow card) 43'; Darbinyan (yellow card) 89'; Ilić (yellow card) 90+2'	Report	R.Safaryan 61'	Stadium: Gyumri City Stadium; Attendance: 100; Referee: Gevorg Eghoyan

25 October 2017 Quarterfinal 2nd leg	Ararat Yerevan	0 – 2 (1 – 3 agg.)	Shirak	Yerevan
15:00 (UTC+4)	G.Kirakosyan (yellow card) 63'; R.Safaryan (yellow card) 85'	Report	V.Bakalyan 65'; Bakayoko 69' (yellow card) 90+1'	Stadium: Alashkert Stadium; Attendance: 20; Referee: Artur Simonyan

7 March 2018 Semifinal 1st leg	Gandzasar Kapan	1 – 1	Shirak	Yerevan
14:00 (UTC+4)	A.Khachatryan 24'; H.Velic (yellow card) 44'; V.Minasyan (yellow card) 52'; M.Grigoryan (yellow card) 59'; Wbeymar (yellow card) 77'	Report	Bakayoko 42'; A.Muradyan (yellow card) 63'	Stadium: Vazgen Sargsyan Republican Stadium; Attendance: 300; Referee: Suren Baliyan

18 April 2018 Semifinal 2nd leg	Shirak	0 – 1 (1 – 2 agg.)	Gandzasar Kapan	Gyumri
16:00 (UTC+4)		Report	Musonda 18'; A.Karapetyan (yellow card) 22'; Meliksetyan (yellow card) 80'	Stadium: Gyumri City Stadium; Attendance: 200; Referee: Suren Baliyan

=== UEFA Europa League ===
==== Qualifying rounds ====
29 June 2017 First qualifying round 1st leg	Shirak (Armenia)	0 – 2	(Slovenia) Gorica	Gyumri, Armenia
16:00 (UTC+4)	Kpodo (yellow card) 74'	Report	Kapić 15', 69'; Boben (yellow card) 38'	Stadium: Gyumri City Stadium; Attendance: 2,100; Referee: Mikhail Vilkov (Russia)

6 July 2017 First qualifying round 2nd leg	Gorica (Slovenia)	2 – 2 (4 – 2 agg.)	(Armenia) Shirak	Nova Gorica, Slovenia
22:30 (UTC+4)	Prljević 13' (o.g.); Celcer (yellow card) 44'; Kapić (yellow card) 60'; Osuji 90+2'	Report	M.Kaba 34'; A.Davoyan (red card) 50'; Bichakhchyan 56'; Nwabueze 81'; Darbinyan (yellow card) 88' (yellow-red card) 89'	Stadium: Nova Gorica Sports Park; Attendance: 1,200; Referee: Peter Kjærsgaard-Andersen (Denmark)

== Statistics ==
As of match played 12 May 2018

=== Appearances and goals ===
No.	Pos	Nat	Player	Total		Premier League		Armenian Cup		Armenian Supercup		UEFA Europa League	
No.	Pos	Nat	Player	Apps	Goals	Apps	Goals	Apps	Goals	Apps	Goals	Apps	Goals
3	DF	(Armenia) ARM	Artyom Mikaelyan	24	1	15+4	1	2	0	1	0	1+1	0
6	DF	(Serbia) SRB	Marko Prljević	15	1	13	1	1	0	0	0	1	0
7	DF	(Armenia) ARM	Hrayr Mkoyan	16	0	14	0	1+1	0	0	0	0	0
9	FW	(Armenia) ARM	Aram Muradyan	32	5	21+6	5	3+1	0	0	0	0+1	0
10	FW	(Armenia) ARM	Vardan Bakalyan	33	5	25+3	4	1+3	1	1	0	0	0
13	GK	(Armenia) ARM	Anatoly Ayvazov	36	0	29	0	4	0	1	0	2	0
14	FW	(Armenia) ARM	David Ghandilyan	15	1	2+11	1	1+1	0	0	0	0	0
16	MF	(Armenia) ARM	Arman Aslanyan	2	0	0+2	0	0	0	0	0	0	0
17	FW	(Armenia) ARM	Arlen Tsaturyan	8	0	0+7	0	1	0	0	0	0	0
18	MF	(Armenia) ARM	Rafik Misakyan	2	0	0+2	0	0	0	0	0	0	0
19	MF	(Nigeria) NGR	Solomon Udo	34	5	28	5	3	0	1	0	2	0
20	DF	(Armenia) ARM	Zhirayr Margaryan	15	1	5+8	1	1+1	0	0	0	0	0
22	MF	(Serbia) SRB	Igor Stanojević	34	6	28	6	3	0	1	0	1+1	0
23	DF	(Armenia) ARM	Robert Darbinyan	32	0	26	0	2+1	0	1	0	2	0
25	DF	(Armenia) ARM	Aghvan Davoyan	35	1	28	1	4	0	1	0	2	0
28	MF	(Ivory Coast) CIV	Mohamed Kaba	33	3	27	2	3	0	1	0	2	1
35	FW	(Senegal) SEN	Yoro Ly	10	0	0+9	0	1	0	0	0	0	0
37	MF	(Armenia) ARM	Rudik Mkrtchyan	17	0	6+7	0	3	0	0+1	0	0	0
40	DF	(Armenia) ARM	Artur Amiryan	6	0	4	0	2	0	0	0	0	0
41	MF	(Armenia) ARM	Mher Safaryan	7	0	2+2	0	1+1	0	0+1	0	0	0
42	MF	(Armenia) ARM	Martun Mkhitaryan	11	1	0+9	0	1	0	0+1	1	0	0
43	DF	(Armenia) ARM	Styopa Gevorgyan	1	0	0	0	0+1	0	0	0	0	0
88	MF	(Ivory Coast) CIV	Moussa Bakayoko	34	11	27+1	7	4	3	1	1	1	0
Players who left Shirak during the season:
5	DF	(Ghana) GHA	Edward Kpodo	16	0	11	0	2	0	1	0	2	0
7	FW	(Bosnia and Herzegovina) BIH	Aleksandar Ilić	20	2	8+7	2	0+2	0	1	0	1+1	0
8	MF	(Armenia) ARM	Ghukas Poghosyan	1	0	0	0	0	0	0	0	0+1	0
10	FW	(Nigeria) NGR	Kyrian Nwabueze	2	0	0	0	0	0	0	0	2	0
11	FW	(Armenia) ARM	Vahan Bichakhchyan	2	1	0	0	0	0	0	0	2	1
20	MF	(Cameroon) CMR	Oumarou Kaina	2	0	0	0	0	0	0	0	1+1	0

=== Goal scorers ===
Place	Position	Nation	Number	Name	Premier League	Armenian Cup	Armenian Supercup	UEFA Europa League	Total
1	MF	(Ivory Coast)	88	Moussa Bakayoko	7	3	1	0	11
2	MF	(Serbia)	22	Igor Stanojević	6	0	0	0	6
3	FW	(Armenia)	9	Aram Muradyan	5	0	0	0	5
3	MF	(Nigeria)	19	Solomon Udo	5	0	0	0	5
3	FW	(Armenia)	10	Vardan Bakalyan	4	1	0	0	5
6	MF	(Ivory Coast)	28	Mohamed Kaba	2	0	0	1	3
7	FW	(Bosnia and Herzegovina)	7	Aleksandar Ilić	2	0	0	0	2
8	DF	(Armenia)	3	Artyom Mikaelyan	1	0	0	0	1
8	FW	(Armenia)	14	David Ghandilyan	1	0	0	0	1
8	DF	(Armenia)	25	Aghvan Davoyan	1	0	0	0	1
8	DF	(Armenia)	20	Zhirayr Margaryan	1	0	0	0	1
8	DF	(Serbia)	6	Marko Prljević	1	0	0	0	1
8	MF	(Armenia)	42	Martun Mkhitaryan	0	0	1	0	1
8	FW	(Armenia)	11	Vahan Bichakhchyan	0	0	0	1	1
8				Own goal	1	0	0	0	1
				TOTALS	36	4	2	2	44

=== Clean sheets ===
Place	Position	Nation	Number	Name	Premier League	Armenian Cup	Armenian Supercup	UEFA Europa League	Total
1	GK	(Armenia)	13	Anatoliy Ayvazov	12	1	1	0	14
				TOTALS	12	1	1	0	14

=== Disciplinary record ===
Number	Nation	Position	Name	Premier League		Armenian Cup		Armenian Supercup		UEFA Europa League		Total	
Number	Nation	Position	Name	Yellow card	Red card	Yellow card	Red card	Yellow card	Red card	Yellow card	Red card	Yellow card	Red card
3	(Armenia)	DF	Artyom Mikaelyan	8	0	0	0	0	0	0	0	8	0
7	(Armenia)	DF	Hrayr Mkoyan	1	0	0	0	0	0	0	0	1	0
9	(Armenia)	FW	Aram Muradyan	6	0	1	0	0	0	0	0	7	0
10	(Armenia)	FW	Vardan Bakalyan	3	0	0	0	0	0	0	0	3	0
10	(Nigeria)	FW	Kyrian Nwabueze	0	0	0	0	0	0	1	0	1	0
13	(Armenia)	GK	Anatoly Ayvazov	3	0	0	0	0	0	0	0	3	0
19	(Nigeria)	MF	Solomon Udo	6	0	0	0	0	0	0	0	6	0
20	(Armenia)	DF	Zhirayr Margaryan	2	0	0	0	0	0	0	0	2	0
22	(Serbia)	MF	Igor Stanojević	4	0	0	0	0	0	0	0	4	0
23	(Armenia)	DF	Robert Darbinyan	4	0	1	0	1	0	2	1	8	1
25	(Armenia)	DF	Aghvan Davoyan	4	0	0	0	1	0	2	1	7	1
28	(Ivory Coast)	MF	Mohamed Kaba	6	0	0	0	1	0	0	0	7	0
35	(Senegal)	FW	Yoro Ly	1	0	0	0	0	0	0	0	1	0
37	(Armenia)	MF	Rudik Mkrtchyan	2	0	0	0	0	0	0	0	2	0
40	(Armenia)	DF	Artur Amiryan	1	0	1	0	0	0	0	0	2	0
41	(Armenia)	MF	Mher Safaryan	1	0	0	0	0	0	0	0	1	0
88	(Ivory Coast)	MF	Moussa Bakayoko	4	0	1	0	0	0	0	0	5	0
Players who left Shirak during the season:
5	(Ghana)	DF	Edward Kpodo	2	0	0	0	0	0	1	0	3	0
7	(Bosnia and Herzegovina)	FW	Aleksandar Ilić	0	0	1	0	0	0	0	0	1	0
			TOTALS	58	1	5	0	3	0	6	2	72	3
