= Kadima Kabangu =

Congolese footballer

Personal information
- Full name: Johns Kadima Kabangu
- Date of birth: 15 June 1993 (age 33)
- Place of birth: Kinshasa, Zaire
- Height: 1.91 m (6 ft 3 in)
- Position: Forward

Team information
- Current team: Al-Ahly Benghazi

Senior career*
Years	Team	Apps	(Gls)
2012–2016	Saint-Éloi Lupopo		
2016–2018	Budapest Honvéd	12	(2)
2016–2018	→ Budapest Honvéd II	7	(3)
2018	Shirak	15	(2)
2019–2021	Motema Pembe		
2022	Raja CA	8	(1)
2022-	Al-Ahly Benghazi	15	(4)

International career^{‡}
2020–	DR Congo	6	(0)
- * Club domestic league appearances and goals as of 3 December 2022 ‡ National team caps and goals as of 30 May 2017

Kadima Kabangu (born 15 June 1993) is a Congolese footballer currently plays for Congolese club Motema Pembe in the Linafoot.

== Career ==
=== Club ===
Kabangu previously played for the Congolese club FC Saint-Éloi Lupopo, until in 2016 he moved to Budapest Honvéd FC in Hungary.

=== International goals ===
Scores and results list DR Congo's goal tally first.

No.	Date	Venue	Opponent	Score	Result	Competition
1.	25 January 2021	Stade Ahmadou Ahidjo, Yaoundé, Cameroon	Niger	1–0	2–1	2020 African Nations Championship

== Career statistics ==
=== Club ===
As of match played 11 November 2018

Appearances and goals by club, season and competition
Club	Season	League			National Cup		Continental		Other		Total	
Club	Season	Division	Apps	Goals	Apps	Goals	Apps	Goals	Apps	Goals	Apps	Goals
Budapest Honvéd	2015–16	Nemzeti Bajnokság I	0	0	0	0	–		–		0	0
Budapest Honvéd	2016–17	Nemzeti Bajnokság I	5	0	2	0	–		–		7	0
Budapest Honvéd	2017–18	Nemzeti Bajnokság I	7	2	0	0	1	0	–		8	2
Budapest Honvéd	Total		12	2	2	0	1	0	-	-	15	2
Shirak	2018–19	Armenian Premier League	13	2	1	0	–		–		14	2
Career total			25	4	3	0	1	0	-	-	29	4
