= Artyom Mikaelyan =

Armenian international footballer (born 1991)

Personal information
- Date of birth: 12 July 1991 (age 35)
- Place of birth: Gyumri, Soviet Union
- Position: Defender

Senior career*
Years	Team	Apps	(Gls)
2010–2023	Shirak	183	(6)
2013–2018	Shirak II	6	(1)

International career^{‡}
2017–	Armenia	2	(0)
- * Club domestic league appearances and goals as of 5 June 2023 ‡ National team caps and goals as of 16:33, 2 August 2019 (UTC)

Artyom Mikaelyan (born 12 July 1991) is an Armenian international footballer who plays as a defender.

== Career ==
=== Club ===
Mikaelyan has played club football for Shirak.

=== International ===
Mikaelyan made his international debut for Armenia in 2017.

== Career statistics ==
=== Club ===
As of match played 23 November 2019

Appearances and goals by club, season and competition
Club	Season	League			National Cup		Continental		Other		Total	
Club	Season	Division	Apps	Goals	Apps	Goals	Apps	Goals	Apps	Goals	Apps	Goals
Shirak	2010	Armenian Premier League	8	0	1	0	-		-		9	0
Shirak	2011	Armenian Premier League	0	0	0	0	-		-		0	0
Shirak	2012–13	Armenian Premier League	2	0	0	0	-		-		2	0
Shirak	2013–14	Armenian Premier League	10	0	2	0	0	0	1	0	13	0
Shirak	2014–15	Armenian Premier League	5	0	0	0	0	0	-		5	0
Shirak	2015–16	Armenian Premier League	11	0	1	0	1	0	-		13	0
Shirak	2016–17	Armenian Premier League	27	0	4	0	4	0	-		35	0
Shirak	2017–18	Armenian Premier League	19	1	2	0	2	0	1	0	24	1
Shirak	2018–19	Armenian Premier League	27	2	2	0	-		-		29	2
Shirak	2019–20	Armenian Premier League	10	0	1	0	-		-		11	0
Shirak	Total		119	3	13	0	7	0	2	0	141	3
Career total			119	3	13	0	7	0	2	0	141	3

=== International ===
Armenia national team
Year	Apps	Goals
2017	2	0
Total	2	0

Statistics accurate as of match played 9 November 2017
