= Kostyantyn Shults =

Ukrainian footballer

Personal information
- Full name: Kostyantyn Eduardovych Shults
- Date of birth: 24 June 1993 (age 33)
- Place of birth: Kherson, Ukraine
- Height: 1.78 m (5 ft 10 in)
- Position: Defender

Team information
- Current team: FK Neptūnas

Youth career
- 2007–2008: Osvita Kherson
- 2008–2009: Monolit Illichivsk
- 2009–2010: Chornomorets Odesa

Senior career*
Years	Team	Apps	(Gls)
2010–2014	Chornomorets Odesa	0	(0)
2010–2011	→ Chornomorets-2 Odesa	16	(0)
2014–2015	Hirnyk-Sport Komsomolsk	41	(0)
2016	Shirak	4	(0)
2017	Atlantas	6	(1)
2017–2021	Džiugas Telšiai	128	(13)
2022	Džiugas Telšiai	22	(0)
2023–2024	FK Banga	50	(1)
2025–	FK Neptūnas	28	(0)
- * Club domestic league appearances and goals as of 31 October 2025 (UTC)

Kostyantyn Eduardovych Shults (Ukrainian: Костянтин Едуардович Шульц; born 24 June 1993) is a Ukrainian professional footballer who plays as a defender for lithuanian Neptūnas Club.

In 2017, he moved from FK Atlantas Klaipėda to FC Džiugas Telšiai. He spent five seasons at Džiugas, playing 128 games in the A Lyga and Pirma Lyga and scoring 13 goals. In December 2021 he left Džiugas but returned in May 2022.
