= Henri Junior Ndong =

Gabonese footballer

Henri Ndong
Personal information
- Full name: Henri Junior Ndong
- Date of birth: 23 August 1992 (age 34)
- Place of birth: Bitam, Gabon
- Height: 1.81 m (5 ft 11 1/2 in)
- Position: Defender

Team information
- Current team: Al-Hejaz

Senior career*
Years	Team	Apps	(Gls)
2009–2010	Stade Mandji		
2010–2012	Bitam		
2012–2016	AJ Auxerre	25	(0)
2017	Sūduva Marijampolė	12	(3)
2017–2018	Samtredia	8	(1)
2018	Shirak	2	(1)
2018–2019	Al-Ahly		
2019–	Al-Hejaz		

International career^{‡}
2011–	Gabon	16	(1)
- * Club domestic league appearances and goals as of 21 December 2018 ‡ National team caps and goals as of 9 March 2018

Henri Junior Ndong Ngaleu (born 23 August 1992) is a Gabonese professional footballer who plays for Al-Hejaz.

== Career ==
=== Club ===
In July 2012, Ndong signed a two-year contract with French Ligue 2 side Auxerre, along with fellow former US Bitam player Rémy Ebanega.

On 25 February 2017, Ndong joined Lithuanian A Lyga side Sūduva Marijampolė. He left team in summer of same year.

In August 2017, Ndong signed for FC Samtredia in the Erovnuli Liga.

==== International ====
Ndong played for Gabon national football team at 2012 Africa Cup of Nations. He plays in the centre-back position.

== Career statistics ==
=== International goals ===
Scores and results list Gabon's goal tally first.

No	Date	Venue	Opponent	Score	Result	Competition
1.	24 March 2017	Stade Océane, Le Havre, France	Guinea	2–2	2–2	Friendly
