= Aleksandar Ilić (footballer, born 1994) =

Bosnian-Herzegovinian footballer

Personal information
- Full name: Aleksandar Ilić
- Date of birth: April 8, 1994 (age 32)
- Place of birth: Loznica, FR Yugoslavia
- Height: 1.82 m (5 ft 11 1/2 in)
- Position: Forward

Youth career
- Drina Zvornik

Senior career*
Years	Team	Apps	(Gls)
2012–2013	Drina Zvornik		
2013–2014	Istra 1961	4	(1)
2014–2015	Drina Zvornik	31	(5)
2016	Javor Ivanjica	0	(0)
2016	Drina Zvornik	26	(3)
2016	Trikala	1	(0)
2017	Bregalnica Štip	6	(0)
2017	Shirak	15	(2)
2018	Vitez	5	(0)
2018-2019	Drina Zvornik		
- * Club domestic league appearances and goals as of 20 September 2017

Aleksandar Ilić (born 8 April 1994) is a Bosnian-Herzegovinian footballer who most recently played as a forward for Drina Zvornik.

== Club career ==
Born in Loznica, Bosnia and Herzegovina, he played mostly with FK Drina Zvornik during his early career. The exception was a season long spell in the neighboring Croatia with Prva HNL side Istra 1961 in the 2013–14 season.

During the winter-break of the 2015–16 season, Ilić moved this time to Bosnian Eastern neighbour, Serbia, and joined Serbian SuperLiga side FK Javor Ivanjica, but instead of getting any chances to play, he was loaned back to Drina Zvornik where he played till the end of the season. In summer 2016 Ilić rejoined permanently Dina Zvornik again.
