= Milutin Ivanović =

Serbian footballer

Personal information
- Full name: Milutin Ivanović
- Date of birth: 30 October 1990 (age 36)
- Place of birth: Niš, SFR Yugoslavia
- Height: 1.82 m (5 ft 11 1/2 in)
- Position: Forward

Team information
- Current team: Car Konstantin

Senior career*
Years	Team	Apps	(Gls)
2009–2010	Radnički Niš	17	(6)
2010–2012	Jagodina	19	(0)
2012	Radnički Niš	0	(0)
2013	Yverdon-Sport	11	(1)
2013–2014	Radnički Niš	0	(0)
2014–2015	Slavija	10	(1)
2015	Ulisses	10	(2)
2016	Car Konstantin		
2017	Shirak	4	(0)
2017	Radnički Niš	1	(0)
2018–	Car Konstantin	0	(0)
- * Club domestic league appearances and goals as of 2 March 2018

Milutin Ivanović (born 30 October 1990, Niš) (Serbian Cyrillic: Милутин Ивановић) is a Serbian footballer, who plays for FK Car Konstantin.

== Career ==
=== Club ===
Ivanović left FC Shirak on 9 June 2017 by mutual consent.

== Statistics ==
Club	Season	League		Cup		Europe		Other		Total	
Club	Season	Apps	Goals	Apps	Goals	Apps	Goals	Apps	Goals	Apps	Goals
Radnički Niš	2009–10	10	6	0	0	0	0	0	0	10	6
Radnički Niš	Total	10	6	0	0	0	0	0	0	10	6
Jagodina	2009–10	7	0	0	0	0	0	0	0	7	0
Jagodina	2010–11	12	0	0	0	0	0	0	0	12	0
Jagodina	Total	19	0	0	0	0	0	0	0	19	0
Yverdon-Sport	2012–13	11	1	0	0	0	0	0	0	11	1
Yverdon-Sport	2013–14	0	0	1	1	0	0	0	0	1	1
Yverdon-Sport	Total	11	1	1	1	0	0	0	0	12	2
Radnički Niš	2013–14	0	0	0	0	0	0	0	0	0	0
Radnički Niš	Total	0	0	0	0	0	0	0	0	0	0
Career total		30	7	1	1	0	0	0	0	31	8
