= Davit Hakobyan =

Armenian footballer

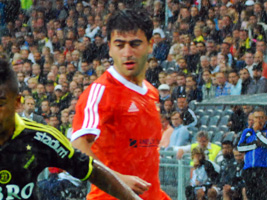
- Hakobyan in 2015

Personal information
- Full name: Davit Hakobyan
- Date of birth: 21 March 1993 (age 33)
- Place of birth: Gyumri, Armenia
- Height: 1.78 m (5 ft 10 in)
- Position: Midfielder

Senior career*
Years	Team	Apps	(Gls)
2010–2017	Shirak	177	(23)

International career
2011–2012	Armenia U19	6	(1)
2013–2014	Armenia U21	8	(3)
2016	Armenia	3	(0)
- * Club domestic league appearances and goals

Davit Hakobyan (Armenian: Դավիթ Հակոբյան; born 21 March 1993) is an Armenian footballer who plays as a midfielder and has appeared for the Armenia national team.

== Career ==
Hakobyan made his international debut for Armenia on 1 June 2016, coming on as a substitute in the 73rd minute for Tigran Barseghyan in a friendly match against El Salvador, which finished as a 4–0 win. He made his first competitive appearance on 11 October 2016, coming on as a substitute in the 85th minute for Marcos Pizzelli in a 2018 FIFA World Cup qualification match against Poland, which finished as a 1–2 away loss.

== Career statistics ==
=== International ===
As of 11 October 2016

Armenia
Year	Apps	Goals
2016	3	0
Total	3	0
