= Georgy Gogichayev =

Russian footballer

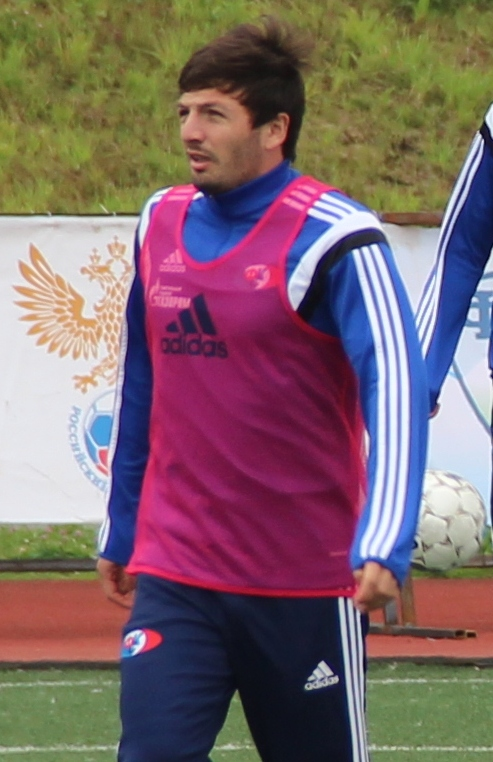

Personal information
- Full name: Georgy Shotayevich Gogichayev
- Date of birth: 16 January 1991 (age 35)
- Place of birth: Vladikavkaz, Russian SFSR
- Height: 1.72 m (5 ft 8 in)
- Position: Striker

Team information
- Current team: Barcelona cf
- Number: 69

Senior career*
Years	Team	Apps	(Gls)
2009	Smena-Zenit St. Petersburg	27	(2)
2010–2011	Alania Vladikavkaz	20	(0)
2012–2013	Alania-d Vladikavkaz	30	(5)
2013	Alania Vladikavkaz	7	(0)
2014	Alania-d Vladikavkaz	9	(5)
2014–2015	Sakhalin Yuzhno-Sakhalinsk	17	(0)
2015–2016	Alania Vladikavkaz	21	(5)
2016	Shirak	11	(1)
2017	Dacia Chișinău	4	(0)
2018	Shirak	8	(1)

International career
2009	Russia U-18	6	(2)
2010	Russia U-19	3	(0)
- * Club domestic league appearances and goals

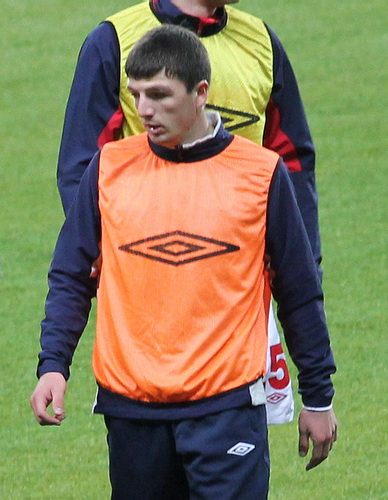
Georgi Gogichayev in 2010

Georgy Shotayevich Gogichayev (Russian: Гео́ргий Шота́евич Гогича́ев; born 16 January 1991) is a Russian former professional association football player.

== Career ==
Gogichayev made his professional debut for FC Alania Vladikavkaz on 13 July 2010 in the Russian Cup game against FC KAMAZ Naberezhnye Chelny.

On 30 August 2016, Gogichayev signed with FC Shirak until 31 July 2017. But he left the club before new year 2017.
