= Moussa Bakayoko =

Ivorian footballer

Personal information
- Full name: Moussa Paul Bakayoko
- Date of birth: 27 December 1996 (age 29)
- Place of birth: Ivory Coast
- Height: 1.81 m (5 ft 11 in)
- Position: Winger

Team information
- Current team: Royal Cambodian Armed Forces
- Number: 10

Youth career
- –2013: Raja CA

Senior career*
Years	Team	Apps	(Gls)
2015	USC Bassam		
2015–2016	Raja	10	(1)
2017–2019	Shirak	82	(20)
2020	Derry City	0	(0)
2020	Dartford	2	(1)
2021	Havant & Waterlooville	2	(0)
2021	Blansko	6	(0)
2022	ASEC Mimosas	9	(1)
2022–2023	Shirak	38	(10)
2023	Zhetysu	8	(1)
2024–2026	Shan United	23	(13)
2026–	Royal Cambodian Armed Forces	5	(2)

International career
2013	Ivory Coast U17	3	(2)
- * Club domestic league appearances and goals as of 2 November 2026

Moussa Paul Bakayoko (born 27 December 1996) is an Ivorian footballer who currently plays as a winger for Myanmar National League club Shan United.

== Club career ==
Before the 2015 season, Bakayoko signed for Raja, one of Morocco's most successful clubs, after playing for USC Bassam in the Ivorian second division.

Before the second half of 2016–17 season, he signed for Armenian side Shirak.

In January 2020 season, Bakayoko signed for Derry City in the League of Ireland on a one-year contract.

In 2020, Bakayoko signed for English sixth division team Dartford before leaving the club at the start of 2021. After leaving Dartford, Bakayoko then signed for Havant & Waterlooville at the start of 2021.

On 5 August 2022, Shirak announced the return of Bakayoko.

On 21 July 2023, Bakayoko signed for Kazakhstan Premier League club Zhetysu.

In May 2024, Bakayoko moved to Southeast Asia to signed with Myanmar National League club Shan United.

== International career ==
Bakayoko represented Ivory Coast at the 2013 FIFA U-17 World Cup held in the United Arab Emirates. In the last group stage match against New Zealand U17 on 23 October, he scored a brace in a 3–0 win which sees the team qualified to the round of 16. Bakayoko also played in Ivory Coast quarter-finals match against Argentina U17 but saw a 2–1 defeat.

== Honours ==
Ivory Coast

- Africa U-17 Cup of Nations
  - Champions (1): 2013

Raja CA

- North African Cup of Champions: 2015

ASEC Mimosas

- Ligue 1: 2021–22

FC Shirak Gyumr

- Armenian Cup
  - Winners (1): 2016–17
- Armenian Super Cup
  - Winners (1): 2017
