= 2017–18 FC Alashkert season =

Alashkert
2017-18 season
- Chairman: Bagrat Navoyan
- Manager: Abraham Khashmanyan (until 1 April); Varuzhan Sukiasyan (from 1 April)
- Stadium: Alashkert Stadium
- Premier League: 1st
- Armenian Cup: Runners Up
- Champions League: Second qualifying round vs BATE Borisov
- Top goalscorer: League: Mihran Manasyan (9); All: Mihran Manasyan (12)

The 2017–18 season was Alashkert's sixth season in the Armenian Premier League and eleventh overall. Alashkert were defending Premier League champions, having won the title the previous season. Domestically, Alashkert finished the season as Champions for the third season in a row, six-points ahead of second placed Banants, whilst they were beaten in the final of the Armenian Cup by Gandzasar Kapan on penalties. In Europe, Alashkert reached the Second qualifying round of the Champions League for the second season in a row, where they were knocked out by BATE Borisov.

== Season events ==
In December 2017, Alashkert entered into partnerships with Brazilian clubs Botafogo and Fluminense.

On 13 December 2017, Karen Muradyan, Zaven Badoyan, Darko Tofiloski, Norair Aslanyan and Lester Peltier all left the club after their contracts were cancelled by mutual consent.

On 8 February 2018, Alashkert announced the signing of Brazilian midfielder Odaílson to a long-term contract from Ferroviária. A day later, 9 February, Aleksandr Shcherbakov and Sergey Serchenkov both joined Alashkert on loan from Ural Yekaterinburg for the remainder of the season.

February 14th saw Brazilian Alan Pires, join Alashkert on an 18-month contract with the club after leaving A.F.C. Tubize, with former Montenegro youth team international goalkeeper Andrija Dragojević joining on 20 February from OFK Grbalj.

At the start of March 2018, Dragojević, Pires and Odaílson, all joined Ararat Yerevan on loan for the remainder of the season, whilst Miljan Jablan left the club by mutual consent.

At the beginning of April 2018, Abraham Khashmanyan resigned as manager with Varuzhan Sukiasyan being appointed as his replacement.

On 16 May, Alashkert played against Gandzasar Kapan in their first Armenian Cup final. After the game ended 0-0 in regular time, goals from Mihran Manasyan and Lubambo Musonda saw the game end 1-1 after extra time, going to penalties which Gandzasar Kapan won 4-3.

== Squad ==
As of 2 March 2018

Note: Flags indicate national team as defined under FIFA eligibility rules; some limited exceptions apply. Players may hold more than one non-FIFA nationality.

| No. | Pos. | Nation | Player |
|---|---|---|---|
| 2 | DF | ARM | Taron Voskanyan |
| 3 | DF | ARM | Andranik Voskanyan |
| 4 | DF | SRB | Mladen Zeljković |
| 5 | DF | SRB | Danijel Stojković |
| 7 | FW | ARM | Mihran Manasyan |
| 8 | DF | ARM | Gagik Daghbashyan |
| 9 | MF | ARM | Artak Dashyan |
| 10 | MF | ARM | Khoren Veranyan (third captain) |
| 11 | FW | NGR | Sunny Omoregie (loan from Maribor) |
| 12 | DF | RUS | Konstantin Morozov |
| 13 | DF | CRO | Dino Škvorc |
| 14 | MF | ARM | Artem Simonyan |
| 15 | FW | SRB | Uroš Nenadović |

| No. | Pos. | Nation | Player |
|---|---|---|---|
| 16 | FW | ARM | Aleksandr Petrosyan |
| 17 | MF | ARM | Artak Yedigaryan |
| 18 | MF | RUS | Aleksandr Scherbakov (on loan from Ural Yekaterinburg) |
| 19 | MF | ARM | David Manoyan |
| 20 | MF | ARM | Artur Yedigaryan (vice-captain) |
| 21 | MF | ARM | Artak Grigoryan |
| 22 | MF | ARM | Ashot Sardaryan |
| 23 | DF | RUS | Rustam Vazitdinov (on loan from Amkar Perm) |
| 24 | MF | RUS | Sergey Serchenkov (on loan from Ural Yekaterinburg) |
| 27 | FW | CRO | Marko Jordan |
| 55 | GK | SRB | Ognjen Čančarević |
| 93 | GK | ARM | Arsen Beglaryan |
| 99 | GK | ARM | Arsen Petrosyan |

=== Out on loan ===
Note: Flags indicate national team as defined under FIFA eligibility rules; some limited exceptions apply. Players may hold more than one non-FIFA nationality.

| No. | Pos. | Nation | Player |
|---|---|---|---|
| 12 | DF | BRA | Alan Pires (at Ararat Yerevan until 30 June 2018) |
| 88 | GK | MNE | Andrija Dragojević (at Ararat Yerevan until 30 June 2018) |

| No. | Pos. | Nation | Player |
|---|---|---|---|
| - | MF | BRA | Odaílson (at Ararat Yerevan until 30 June 2018) |

== Transfers ==
=== In ===
| Date | Position | Nationality | Name | From | Fee | Ref. |
|---|---|---|---|---|---|---|
| 1 July 2017 | DF | (Serbia) | Miljan Jablan | Mladost Podgorica | Undisclosed | |
| 1 July 2017 | DF | (Serbia) | Mladen Zeljković | Radnik Bijeljina | Undisclosed | |
| 1 July 2017 | MF | (Armenia) | Karen Muradyan | Gällivare Malmbergets | Undisclosed | |
| 24 July 2017 | MF | (Armenia) | Norair Aslanyan | Telstar | Undisclosed | |
| 2 August 2017 | MF | (Armenia) | Ashot Sardaryan | Jeunesse Esch | Undisclosed | |
| 2 August 2017 | MF | (Armenia) | Nairi Minasyan | Banants | Undisclosed | |
| 9 August 2017 | MF | (Armenia) | Artem Simonyan | Zürich | Undisclosed | |
| 22 August 2017 | GK | (North Macedonia) | Darko Tofiloski | DAC Dunajská Streda | Undisclosed | |
| 1 January 2018 | FW | (Armenia) | Aleksandr Petrosyan | Ararat Yerevan | Undisclosed | |
| 16 January 2018 | MF | (Armenia) | Kamo Hovhannisyan | Torpedo-BelAZ Zhodino | Undisclosed | |
| 8 February 2018 | MF | (Armenia) | David Manoyan | Nea Salamis Famagusta | Undisclosed | |
| 8 February 2018 | MF | (Brazil) | Odaílson | Ferroviária | Undisclosed | |
| 11 February 2018 | FW | (Croatia) | Marko Jordan | Latina | Undisclosed | |
| 12 February 2018 | DF | (Armenia) | Taron Voskanyan | Nea Salamis Famagusta | Undisclosed | |
| 12 February 2018 | DF | (Croatia) | Dino Škvorc | NK Ankaran | Undisclosed | |
| 13 February 2018 | GK | (Serbia) | Ognjen Čančarević | Radnik Surdulica | Undisclosed | |
| 14 February 2018 | DF | (Brazil) | Alan Pires | Tubize | Undisclosed | |
| 20 February 2018 | GK | (Montenegro) | Andrija Dragojević | OFK Grbalj | Undisclosed | |
| 27 February 2018 | DF | (Russia) | Konstantin Morozov | Ararat Moscow | Undisclosed | |

=== Loans in ===
| Date from | Position | Nationality | Name | From | Date to | Ref. |
|---|---|---|---|---|---|---|
| 21 February 2018 | FW | (Nigeria) | Sunny Omoregie | NK Maribor | End of season | |
| 9 February 2018 | MF | (Russia) | Aleksandr Shcherbakov | Ural Yekaterinburg | End of season | |
| 9 February 2018 | MF | (Russia) | Sergey Serchenkov | Ural Yekaterinburg | End of season | |
| 22 February 2018 | DF | (Russia) | Rustam Vazitdinov | Amkar Perm | End of season | |

=== Loans out ===
| Date from | Position | Nationality | Name | To | Date to | Ref. |
|---|---|---|---|---|---|---|
| 1 March 2018 | GK | (Montenegro) | Andrija Dragojević | Ararat Yerevan | End of season | |
| 1 March 2018 | DF | (Brazil) | Alan Pires | Ararat Yerevan | End of season | |
| 1 March 2018 | MF | (Brazil) | Odaílson | Ararat Yerevan | End of season | |

=== Released ===
| Date | Position | Nationality | Name | Joined | Date | Ref |
|---|---|---|---|---|---|---|
| 19 July 2017 | FW | (Armenia) | Gevorg Nranyan | Gandzasar Kapan | 25 July 2017 | |
| 20 July 2017 | GK | (Armenia) | Gevorg Kasparov | Gandzasar Kapan | 22 July 2017 | |
| 13 December 2017 | GK | (North Macedonia) | Darko Tofiloski | Pobeda AD | 30 January 2018 | |
| 13 December 2017 | MF | (Armenia) | Norair Aslanyan | Emmen | 1 January 2018 | |
| 13 December 2017 | MF | (Armenia) | Zaven Badoyan | Shabab Sahel | 16 January 2018 | |
| 13 December 2017 | MF | (Armenia) | Karen Muradyan | Shirak | 1 September 2018 | |
| 13 December 2017 | FW | (Trinidad and Tobago) | Lester Peltier | Banants | 24 February 2018 | |
| 31 January 2018 | MF | (Armenia) | Kamo Hovhannisyan | Zhetysu | 31 January 2018 | |
| 1 January 2018 | DF | (Armenia) | Vahagn Minasyan | Artsakh | 1 July 2018 | |
| 19 February 2018 | DF | (Ukraine) | Dmytro Khovbosha | Avanhard Kramatorsk | 19 February 2018 | |
| 28 February 2018 | DF | (Armenia) | Edvard Hovhannisyan | Ararat Yerevan | | |
| 1 March 2018 | DF | (Armenia) | Ararat Arakelyan | | | |
| 1 March 2018 | DF | (Serbia) | Miljan Jablan | Proleter Novi Sad | 15 July 2018 | |
| 13 June 2018 | GK | (Armenia) | Arsen Beglaryan | Liepāja | | |
| 13 June 2018 | MF | (Armenia) | Khoren Veranyan | Shirak | | |
| 13 June 2018 | MF | (Armenia) | David Manoyan | Sandecja Nowy Sącz | | |
| 13 June 2018 | FW | (Croatia) | Marko Jordan | Episkopi | | |
| 24 June 2018 | GK | (Montenegro) | Andrija Dragojević | Pyunik | 24 June 2018 | |
| 30 June 2018 | GK | (Armenia) | Arsen Petrosyan | Retired | | |
| 30 June 2018 | DF | (Brazil) | Alan Pires | America | 12 December 2018 | |
| 30 June 2018 | DF | (Russia) | Konstantin Morozov | Veles Moscow | 26 July 2018 | |
| 30 June 2018 | MF | (Armenia) | Ashot Sardaryan | Lunéville | | |
| 30 June 2018 | MF | (Brazil) | Odaílson | AD São Pedro da Cova | | |
| 30 June 2018 | FW | (Armenia) | Aleksandr Petrosyan | Retired | | |

== Competitions ==
=== Supercup ===
| 24 September 2017 | Alashkert | 0 – 2 | Shirak | Yerevan |
| 19:30 (UTC+4) | Grigoryan (yellow card) 30'; Minasyan (yellow card) 55'; Voskanyan (yellow card) 59' | Report | M.Kaba (yellow card) 28'; A.Davoyan (yellow card) 59'; R.Darbinyan (yellow card) 65'; M.Bakayoko 80'; M.Mkhitaryan 90' | Stadium: Vazgen Sargsyan Republican Stadium; Attendance: 2,000; Referee: Suren Baliyan |

=== Premier League ===
==== Results summary ====
| Overall | | | | | | | | Home | | | | | | Away | | | | | |
| Pld | W | D | L | GF | GA | GD | Pts | W | D | L | GF | GA | GD | W | D | L | GF | GA | GD |
|---|---|---|---|---|---|---|---|---|---|---|---|---|---|---|---|---|---|---|---|
| 30 | 14 | 8 | 8 | 44 | 31 | +13 | 50 | 8 | 4 | 3 | 22 | 11 | +11 | 6 | 4 | 5 | 22 | 20 | +2 |

Last updated: 20 May 2018.
Source: See Results

==== Results ====
| 4 August 2017 1 | Shirak | 2 – 1 | Alashkert | Gyumri |
| 17:30 (UTC+4) | A.Mikaelyan 45+1' (yellow card) 85'; A.Muradyan 55' (yellow card) 58'; R.Mkrtchyan (yellow card) 55'; Stanojević (yellow card) 90+5' | Report | M.Manasyan 28'; Beglaryan (yellow card) 66'; Yedigaryan (yellow card) 88' | Stadium: Gyumri City Stadium; Attendance: 800; Referee: Zaven Hovhannisyan |

| 12 August 2017 2 | Alashkert | 3 – 0 | Ararat Yerevan | Yerevan |
| 18:00 (UTC+4) | Grigoryan (yellow card) 25'; Manasyan 36', 63'; Artu.Yedigaryan 75' | Report | R.Yeghiazaryan (yellow card) 12'; Go.Poghosyan (yellow card) 34' | Stadium: Alashkert Stadium; Attendance: 500; Referee: Suren Baliyan |

| 18 August 2017 3 | Banants | 2 – 2 | Alashkert | Yerevan |
| 17:00 (UTC+4) | Krasić (yellow card) 69'; Poghosyan 70'; M.Guyganov 78'; N.Petrosyan (yellow card) 86' | Report | Arta.Yedigaryan 8' (yellow card) 43'; Nenadović 58'; Khovbosha (yellow card) 82' | Stadium: Banants Stadium; Attendance: 1,000; Referee: Gevorg Eghoyan |

| 25 August 2017 4 | Alashkert | 5 – 1 | Pyunik | Yerevan |
| 17:00 (UTC+4) | Arta.Yedigaryan 14', 31', 39'; Nenadović 28'; K.Veranyan 59' | Report | A.Arakelyan 30'; A.Kartashyan (yellow card) 76' | Stadium: Alashkert Stadium; Attendance: 500; Referee: Suren Baliyan |

| 8 September 2017 5 | Gandzasar Kapan | 1 – 1 | Alashkert | Yerevan |
| 18:00 (UTC+4) | Wbeymar (yellow card) 19'; Živković 60' (yellow card) 68'; Ishkhanyan (yellow card) 72'; Junior (yellow card) 75'; A.Khachatryan (red card) 88' | Report | Muradyan (yellow card) 46'; Daghbashyan (yellow card) 54'; M.Manasyan (yellow card) 64'; Minasyan (yellow card) 72'; Arta.Yedigaryan 81' (pen.) | Stadium: Vazgen Sargsyan Republican Stadium; Attendance: 500; Referee: Suren Baliyan |

| 16 September 2017 6 | Alashkert | 1 – 0 | Shirak | Yerevan |
| 16:00 (UTC+4) | Simonyan (yellow card) 35'; Nenadović 54'; Minasyan (yellow card) 68'; Voskanyan (yellow card) 69' (yellow-red card) 88'; Beglaryan (yellow card) 85' | Report | R.Darbinyan (yellow card) 4'; V.Bakalyan (yellow card) 31'; A.Mikaelyan (yellow card) 55'; A.Muradyan (yellow card) 69' (yellow-red card) 70' | Stadium: Alashkert Stadium; Attendance: 900; Referee: Zaven Hovhannisyan |

| 27 September 2017 7 | Ararat Yerevan | 1 – 3 | Alashkert | Yerevan |
| 16:00 (UTC+4) | Al.Petrosyan 18'; Gareginyan (yellow card) 42'; An.Kocharyan (yellow card) 50' | Report | Muradyan (yellow card) 52'; Ar.Yedigaryan 75' (pen.); Nenadović 78', 90' | Stadium: Mika Stadium; Attendance: 400; Referee: Gevorg Eghoyan |

| 30 September 2017 8 | Alashkert | 2 – 0 | Banants | Yerevan |
| 16:00 (UTC+4) | Arta.Yedigaryan 42' (pen.); Khovbosha (yellow card) 51'; Peltier 62'; Jablan (yellow card) 70'; Simonyan (yellow card) 84'; Daghbashyan (yellow card) 88' | Report | Jovanović (yellow card) 41'; K.Sibo (yellow card) 45' | Stadium: Alashkert Stadium; Attendance: 500; Referee: Zaven Hovhannisyan |

| 15 October 2017 9 | Pyunik | 0 – 1 | Alashkert | Yerevan |
| 19:00 (UTC+4) | A.Manucharyan (yellow card) 54'; V.Hayrapetyan (yellow card) 67'; A.Kartashyan (yellow card) 71' | Report | Simonyan 7'; Grigoryan (yellow card) 28'; Arakelyan (yellow card) 43'; Peltier (yellow card) 71' | Stadium: Vazgen Sargsyan Republican Stadium; Attendance: 300; Referee: Artur Simonyan |

| 22 October 2017 10 | Alashkert | 0 – 3 | Gandzasar Kapan | Yerevan |
| 15:00 (UTC+4) | | Report | Ishkhanyan 7'; Yashin 29'; Musonda 49'; V.Minasyan (yellow card) 63'; Wbeymar (yellow card) 85' | Stadium: Alashkert Stadium; Attendance: 400; Referee: Zaven Hovhannisyan |

| 29 October 2017 11 | Shirak | 0 – 1 | Alashkert | Gyumri |
| 15:00 (UTC+4) | R.Mkrtchyan (yellow card) 51'; M.Bakayoko (yellow card) 56' | Report | Simonyan (yellow card) 61'; Peltier 88' | Stadium: Gyumri City Stadium; Attendance: 1,000; Referee: Suren Baliyan |

| 3 November 2017 12 | Alashkert | 2 – 0 | Ararat Yerevan | Yerevan |
| 15:00 (UTC+4) | M.Manasyan 45+1', 70'; Zeljković (yellow card) 74' | Report | S.Mkrtchyan (yellow card) 38' | Stadium: Alashkert Stadium; Attendance: 300; Referee: Zaven Hovhannisyan |

| 17 November 2017 13 | Banants | 2 – 2 | Alashkert | Yerevan |
| 15:00 (UTC+4) | Jovanović (yellow card) 8'; Injac 38'; Hovsepyan (yellow card) 80'; M.Grigoryan 89' | Report | Arta.Yedigaryan 27', 58'; Artu.Yedigaryan (yellow card) 37'; Jablan (yellow card) 44'; K.Veranyan (yellow card) 79' | Stadium: Banants Stadium; Attendance: 500; Referee: Zaven Hovhannisyan |

| 24 November 2017 14 | Alashkert | 1 – 0 | Pyunik | Yerevan |
| 15:00 (UTC+4) | M.Manasyan 23'; K.Veranyan (yellow card) 58' (yellow-red card) 67'; Voskanyan (yellow card) 83' | Report | | Stadium: Alashkert Stadium; Attendance: 400; Referee: Gevorg Eghoyan |

| 1 December 2017 15 | Gandzasar Kapan | 1 – 0 | Alashkert | Yerevan |
| 16:00 (UTC+4) | G.Harutyunyan (yellow card) 49'; A.Khachatryan 77' (pen.) | Report | Stojković (yellow card) 41'; Jablan (yellow card) 90+3' | Stadium: Vazgen Sargsyan Republican Stadium; Attendance: 250; Referee: Zaven Hovhannisyan |

| 28 February 2018 16 | Alashkert | 0 – 1 | Shirak | Yerevan |
| 14:00 (UTC+4) | Nenadović (yellow card) 86' | Report | Stanojević 14'; M.Bakayoko (yellow card) 89' | Stadium: Alashkert Stadium; Attendance: 600; Referee: Zaven Hovhannisyan |

| 4 March 2018 17 | Ararat Yerevan | 2 – 3 | Alashkert | Yerevan |
| 14:00 (UTC+4) | O.Hamvardzumyan 51'; An.Kocharyan 74'; R.Safaryan (yellow card) 76' | Report | Simonyan 12' (pen.); Omoregie 37', 49'; S.Serchenkov (yellow card) 54'; A.Scherbakov (yellow card) 70' | Stadium: Alashkert Stadium; Attendance: 300; Referee: Gevorg Eghoyan |

| 11 March 2018 18 | Alashkert | 2 – 2 | Banants | Yerevan |
| 15:00 (UTC+4) | M.Manasyan 36'; Simonyan 38'; T.Voskanyan (yellow card) 43'; Artu.Yedigaryan (yellow card) 70'; Nenadović (yellow card) 77'; K.Veranyan (yellow card) 89' | Report | V.Ayvazyan 21'; A.Bareghamyan 28'; Peltier (yellow card) 61' | Stadium: Alashkert Stadium; Attendance: 800; Referee: Suren Baliyan |

| 17 March 2018 19 | Pyunik | 3 – 1 | Alashkert | Yerevan |
| 14:00 (UTC+4) | Diarrassouba 16'; A.Arakelyan 22'; Avetisyan 45+2'; R.Hakobyan (yellow card) 69' | Report | A.Voskanyan (yellow card) 1'; Daghbashyan (yellow card) 23'; Simonyan (yellow card) 53'; Omoregie 58'; Morozov (yellow card) 65' | Stadium: Vazgen Sargsyan Republican Stadium; Attendance: 600; Referee: Artur Simonyan |

| 1 April 2018 20 | Alashkert | 0 – 1 | Gandzasar Kapan | Yerevan |
| 15:00 (UTC+4) | Zeljković (yellow card) 18'; Škvorc (yellow card) 79' | Report | Junior 4'; A.Khachatryan (yellow card) 41'; Yashin (yellow card) 86' | Stadium: Alashkert Stadium; Attendance: 500; Referee: Suren Baliyan |

| 4 April 2018 21 | Shirak | 1 – 0 | Alashkert | Gyumri |
| 15:00 (UTC+4) | M.Kaba (yellow card) 16'; D.Ghandilyan 90' | Report | B.Hovhannisyan (yellow card) 65'; Stojković (yellow card) 71' | Stadium: Gyumri City Stadium; Attendance: 600; Referee: Artur Simonyan |

| 7 April 2018 22 | Alashkert | 2 – 1 | Ararat Yerevan | Yerevan |
| 16:00 (UTC+4) | Arta.Yedigaryan 1', 11'; Čančarević (yellow card) 90+3' | Report | R.Avagyan (yellow card) 26'; G.Ohanyan 45+2' | Stadium: Alashkert Stadium; Attendance: 500; Referee: Artur Safaryan |

| 14 April 2018 23 | Banants | 3 – 0 | Alashkert | Yerevan |
| 16:00 (UTC+4) | Peltier 13'; M.Guyganov (yellow card) 36'; N.Petrosyan (yellow card) 42'; Krasić 51'; V.Ayvazyan (yellow card) 53'; K.Sibo 83' | Report | Čančarević (yellow card) 78'; Stojković (yellow card) 85' | Stadium: Banants Stadium; Attendance: 800; Referee: Gevorg Eghoyan |

| 22 April 2018 24 | Alashkert | 0 – 0 | Pyunik | Yerevan |
| 17:00 (UTC+4) | | Report | Vardanyan (yellow card) 31' | Stadium: Alashkert Stadium; Attendance: 200; Referee: Suren Baliyan |

| 28 April 2018 25 | Gandzasar Kapan | 0 – 4 | Alashkert | Yerevan |
| 17:00 (UTC+4) | | Report | Nenadović 23', 52'; Arta.Yedigaryan 71'; Omoregie 87' | Stadium: Banants Stadium; Attendance: 300; Referee: Zaven Hovhannisyan |

| 2 May 2018 26 | Alashkert | 0 – 0 | Shirak | Yerevan |
| 17:00 (UTC+4) | Simonyan (yellow card) 84' | Report | A.Davoyan (yellow card) 33'; A.Muradyan (yellow card) 56' | Stadium: Alashkert Stadium; Attendance: 250; Referee: Zaven Hovhannisyan |

| 5 May 2018 27 | Ararat Yerevan | 2 – 3 | Alashkert | Yerevan |
| 17:00 (UTC+4) | G.Ohanyan 16'; D.Minasyan 57'; R.Avagyan (yellow card) 88' | Report | Omoregie 25'; Grigoryan (yellow card) 32'; M.Manasyan 47'; Dashyan 71' | Stadium: Alashkert Stadium; Attendance: 200; Referee: Artur Safaryan |

| 8 May 2018 28 | Alashkert | 2 – 2 | Banants | Yerevan |
| 17:00 (UTC+4) | Nenadović 61'; M.Manasyan 79'; Škvorc (yellow card) 90+1' | Report | Peltier 14', 45+1'; Krasić (yellow card) 34'; V.Ayvazyan (yellow card) 54'; A.Bareghamyan (yellow card) 78' | Stadium: Alashkert Stadium; Attendance: 300; Referee: Suren Baliyan |

| 12 May 2018 29 | Pyunik | 0 – 0 | Alashkert | Yerevan |
| 19:00 (UTC+4) | A.Kartashyan (yellow card) 67' | Report | Grigoryan (yellow card) 33'; M.Manasyan (yellow card) 42' | Stadium: Vazgen Sargsyan Republican Stadium; Attendance: 600; Referee: Artur Simonyan |

| 20 May 2018 30 | Alashkert | 2 – 0 | Gandzasar Kapan | Yerevan |
| (UTC+4) | Dashyan 33'; T.Voskanyan (yellow card) 57'; Arta.Yedigaryan 77' | Report | Bamba (yellow card) 36'; G.Nranyan (yellow card) 47' | Stadium: Alashkert Stadium; Attendance: 1,000; Referee: Suren Baliyan |

==== Table ====
| Pos | Team | Pld | W | D | L | GF | GA | GD | Pts | Qualification |
|---|---|---|---|---|---|---|---|---|---|---|
| 1 | Alashkert (C) | 30 | 14 | 8 | 8 | 44 | 31 | +13 | 50 | Qualification for the Champions League first qualifying round |
| 2 | Banants | 30 | 11 | 11 | 8 | 42 | 34 | +8 | 44 | Qualification for the Europa League first qualifying round (Note: Gandzasar Kapan qualified for the Europa League first qualifying round by winning the 2017–18 Armenian Cup.) |
| 3 | Gandzasar Kapan | 30 | 11 | 10 | 9 | 43 | 34 | +9 | 43 | Qualification for the Europa League first qualifying round |
| 4 | Shirak | 30 | 14 | 8 | 8 | 37 | 31 | +6 | 38 (Note: Shirak were deducted 12 points on decision of Disciplinary Committee, upheld on May 18, due to match fixing scandal.) | |
| 5 | Pyunik | 30 | 9 | 9 | 12 | 37 | 41 | −4 | 36 | Qualification for the Europa League first qualifying round |
| 6 | Ararat Yerevan | 30 | 5 | 6 | 19 | 33 | 65 | −32 | 21 | |

Source: Soccerway
Rules for classification: 1) Points; 2) Play-off (only if deciding champion); 3) Matches won; 4) Head-to-head points; 5) Head-to-head matches won; 6) Head-to-head goal difference; 7) Head-to-head goals scored; 8) Head-to-head away goals scored; 9) Goal difference; 10) Goals scored.
(C) Champions

=== Armenian Cup ===
| 21 September 2017 Quarterfinal 1st leg | Artsakh | 1 – 3 | Alashkert | Yerevan |
| 16:00 (UTC+4) | G.Aghekyan 9' | Report | M.Manasyan 27', 62'; Peltier (yellow card) 44'; Artu.Yedigaryan 73' (pen.) | Stadium: Mika Stadium; Attendance: 200; Referee: Shahen Aghayan |

| 19 October 2017 Quarterfinal 2nd leg | Alashkert | 6 – 0 (9 – 1 agg.) | Artsakh | Yerevan |
| 15:00 (UTC+4) | Jablan 25'; Arta.Yedigaryan 66'; Artu.Yedigaryan 69', 76', 80'; Dashyan 90+1' | Report | V.Mirakyan (yellow card) 16' | Stadium: Alashkert Stadium; Attendance: 100; Referee: Henrik Nalbandyan |

| 8 March 2018 Semifinal 1st leg | Banants | 0 – 1 | Alashkert | Yerevan |
| 15:00 (UTC+4) | Krasić (yellow card) 17'; Wal (yellow card) 34'; Peltier (yellow card) 90' | Report | T.Voskanyan (yellow card) 16'; Zeljković (yellow card) 39'; Dashyan 58' | Stadium: Banants Stadium; Attendance: 1,000; Referee: Artur Simonyan |

| 17 April 2018 Semifinal 2nd leg | Alashkert | 1 – 0 (2 – 0 agg.) | Banants | Yerevan |
| 16:00 (UTC+4) | Arta.Yedigaryan 40'; Zeljković (yellow card) 57'; Voskanyan (yellow card) 80' | Report | K.Sibo (yellow card) 64'; Ayrapetyan (yellow card) 84'; A.Bareghamyan (yellow card) 90+5' | Stadium: Alashkert Stadium; Attendance: 250; Referee: Zaven Hovhannisyan |

==== Final ====
| 16 May 2018 Final | Gandzasar Kapan | 1 – 1 (a.e.t.) (4 – 3 p) | Alashkert | Yerevan |
| 19:00 (UTC+4) | Musonda 116' | Report | M. Manasyan 106' | Stadium: Vazgen Sargsyan Republican Stadium; Attendance: 1,000; Referee: Artur Simonyan |
| | Penalties |
| | Ishkhanyan (penalty missed); Christian (penalty scored); A.Khachatryan (penalty scored); Musonda (penalty scored); Harutyunyan (penalty scored) | | (penalty scored) Nenadović; (penalty scored) Arta.Yedigaryan; (penalty scored) Daghbashyan; (penalty missed) Manoyan; (penalty missed) T.Voskanyan |

=== UEFA Champions League ===
==== Qualifying rounds ====
| 27 June 2017 First qualifying round 1st leg | Alashkert (Armenia) | 1 – 0 | (Andorra) Santa Coloma | Yerevan, Armenia |
| 20:00 (UTC+4) | Stojković (yellow card) 33'; Nenadović 39'; Arta.Yedigaryan (yellow card) 74'; Zeljković (yellow card) 79' | Report | A.Ramos (yellow card) 22'; E.Casals (yellow card) 68'; Lima (yellow card) 90+5' | Stadium: Republican Stadium; Attendance: 3,300; Referee: Stefan Apostolov (Bulgaria) |
Note: Match played at the Republican Stadium in Yerevan, instead of Alashkert's regular Alashkert Stadium in Yerevan.

| 4 July 2017 First qualifying round 2nd leg | Santa Coloma (Andorra) | 1 – 1 (1 – 2 agg.) | (Armenia) Alashkert | Andorra la Vella, Andorra |
| 22:30 (UTC+4) | Rebés (yellow card) 28'; Galán (yellow card) 36'; E.Casals (yellow card) 50'; Lima 63' (yellow card) 80'; R.Ramos (yellow card) 88'; Capdevila (yellow card) 90+4'; Q.Cubas (yellow card) 90+7' | Report | Nenadović 28'; Artu.Yedigaryan (yellow card) 36'; Peltier (yellow card) 90+1' | Stadium: Estadi Comunal; Attendance: 850; Referee: Sven Bindels (Luxembourg) |

| 12 July 2017 Second qualifying round 1st leg | BATE Borisov (Belarus) | 1 – 1 | (Armenia) Alashkert | Barysaw, Belarus |
| 21:30 (UTC+4) | Rios 43'; Ivanić (yellow card) 64' | Report | Rios 78' (o.g.) | Stadium: Borisov Arena; Attendance: 11,192; Referee: Enea Jorgji (Albania) |

| 18 July 2017 Second qualifying round 2nd leg | Alashkert (Armenia) | 1 – 3 (2 – 4 agg.) | (Belarus) BATE Borisov | Yerevan, Armenia |
| 20:00 (UTC+4) | Nenadović 18'; K.Veranyan (yellow card) 34'; Dashyan (yellow card) 81'; Peltier (yellow card) 90+4' | Report | Gordeichuk 23', 35'; M.Valadzko (yellow card) 45+3' (goal) 78'; Palyakow (yellow card) 64'; Kendysh (yellow card) 90+4' | Stadium: Republican Stadium; Attendance: 10,000; Referee: Peter Kralović (Slovakia) |
Note: Match played at the Republican Stadium in Yerevan, instead of Alashkert's regular Alashkert Stadium in Yerevan.

== Statistics ==
As of match played 20 May 2018

=== Appearances and goals ===
| No. | Pos | Nat | Player | Total | | Premier League | | Armenian Cup | | Armenian Supercup | | UEFA Champions League | |
| No. | Pos | Nat | Player | Apps | Goals | Apps | Goals | Apps | Goals | Apps | Goals | Apps | Goals |
|---|---|---|---|---|---|---|---|---|---|---|---|---|---|
| 2 | DF | (Armenia) ARM | Taron Voskanyan | 12 | 0 | 10 | 0 | 2 | 0 | 0 | 0 | 0 | 0 |
| 3 | DF | (Armenia) ARM | Andranik Voskanyan | 28 | 0 | 19+3 | 0 | 0+1 | 0 | 1 | 0 | 4 | 0 |
| 4 | DF | (Serbia) SRB | Mladen Zeljković | 21 | 0 | 13+2 | 0 | 2+1 | 0 | 1 | 0 | 0+2 | 0 |
| 5 | DF | (Serbia) SRB | Danijel Stojković | 28 | 0 | 20+1 | 0 | 3 | 0 | 0 | 0 | 4 | 0 |
| 7 | FW | (Armenia) ARM | Mihran Manasyan | 33 | 11 | 19+7 | 9 | 2+1 | 2 | 0+1 | 0 | 2+1 | 0 |
| 8 | DF | (Armenia) ARM | Gagik Daghbashyan | 35 | 0 | 27+1 | 0 | 3 | 0 | 0 | 0 | 4 | 0 |
| 9 | MF | (Armenia) ARM | Artak Dashyan | 36 | 4 | 25+2 | 2 | 3+1 | 2 | 0+1 | 0 | 4 | 0 |
| 10 | MF | (Armenia) ARM | Khoren Veranyan | 24 | 1 | 8+7 | 1 | 1+3 | 0 | 1 | 0 | 4 | 0 |
| 11 | FW | (Nigeria) NGR | Sunny Omoregie | 10 | 5 | 4+5 | 5 | 0+1 | 0 | 0 | 0 | 0 | 0 |
| 12 | DF | (Russia) RUS | Konstantin Morozov | 4 | 0 | 3+1 | 0 | 0 | 0 | 0 | 0 | 0 | 0 |
| 13 | DF | (Croatia) CRO | Dino Škvorc | 13 | 0 | 11 | 0 | 2 | 0 | 0 | 0 | 0 | 0 |
| 14 | MF | (Armenia) ARM | Artem Simonyan | 27 | 3 | 17+8 | 3 | 0+1 | 0 | 0+1 | 0 | 0 | 0 |
| 15 | FW | (Serbia) SRB | Uroš Nenadović | 37 | 11 | 20+9 | 8 | 2+1 | 0 | 1 | 0 | 3+1 | 3 |
| 16 | FW | (Armenia) ARM | Aleksandr Petrosyan | 2 | 0 | 1+1 | 0 | 0 | 0 | 0 | 0 | 0 | 0 |
| 17 | MF | (Armenia) ARM | Artak Yedigaryan | 34 | 5 | 24+3 | 4 | 2 | 1 | 1 | 0 | 4 | 0 |
| 18 | MF | (Russia) RUS | Aleksandr Scherbakov | 1 | 0 | 0+1 | 0 | 0 | 0 | 0 | 0 | 0 | 0 |
| 19 | MF | (Armenia) ARM | David Manoyan | 4 | 0 | 1+3 | 0 | 0 | 0 | 0 | 0 | 0 | 0 |
| 20 | MF | (Armenia) ARM | Artur Yedigaryan | 34 | 11 | 17+9 | 7 | 3+1 | 4 | 1 | 0 | 2+1 | 0 |
| 21 | MF | (Armenia) ARM | Artak Grigoryan | 35 | 1 | 29 | 0 | 2+1 | 1 | 1 | 0 | 1+1 | 0 |
| 22 | FW | (Croatia) CRO | Marko Jordan | 5 | 0 | 0+5 | 0 | 0 | 0 | 0 | 0 | 0 | 0 |
| 24 | MF | (Russia) RUS | Sergey Serchenkov | 5 | 0 | 1+4 | 0 | 0 | 0 | 0 | 0 | 0 | 0 |
| 55 | GK | (Serbia) SRB | Ognjen Čančarević | 15 | 0 | 13 | 0 | 2 | 0 | 0 | 0 | 0 | 0 |
| 93 | GK | (Armenia) ARM | Arsen Beglaryan | 21 | 0 | 16 | 0 | 0 | 0 | 1 | 0 | 4 | 0 |
| | DF | (Armenia) ARM | Artashes Arakelyan | 2 | 0 | 0+1 | 0 | 1 | 0 | 0 | 0 | 0 | 0 |
| | MF | (Armenia) ARM | Benik Hovhannisyan | 2 | 0 | 0+2 | 0 | 0 | 0 | 0 | 0 | 0 | 0 |
| | MF | (Armenia) ARM | Ashot Sardaryan | 12 | 0 | 2+7 | 0 | 2 | 0 | 1 | 0 | 0 | 0 |
Players who left Alashkert during the season:
| 2 | DF | (Ukraine) UKR | Dmytro Khovbosha | 13 | 0 | 6+1 | 0 | 2 | 0 | 1 | 0 | 3 | 0 |
| 6 | DF | (Armenia) ARM | Ararat Arakelyan | 7 | 0 | 3+1 | 0 | 1 | 0 | 0 | 0 | 2 | 0 |
| 11 | MF | (Armenia) ARM | Zaven Badoyan | 7 | 0 | 2+1 | 0 | 2 | 0 | 0 | 0 | 0+2 | 0 |
| 12 | MF | (Armenia) ARM | Karen Muradyan | 3 | 0 | 2 | 0 | 1 | 0 | 0 | 0 | 0 | 0 |
| 13 | DF | (Serbia) SRB | Miljan Jablan | 10 | 1 | 6 | 0 | 2 | 1 | 0 | 0 | 2 | 0 |
| 18 | MF | (Armenia) ARM | Norair Aslanyan | 2 | 0 | 0+2 | 0 | 0 | 0 | 0 | 0 | 0 | 0 |
| 19 | DF | (Armenia) ARM | Vahagn Minasyan | 10 | 0 | 6 | 0 | 0 | 0 | 1 | 0 | 1+2 | 0 |
| 77 | FW | (Trinidad and Tobago) TTO | Lester Peltier | 10 | 2 | 4+3 | 2 | 1 | 0 | 0 | 0 | 0+2 | 0 |
| 90 | GK | (North Macedonia) MKD | Darko Tofiloski | 3 | 0 | 1 | 0 | 2 | 0 | 0 | 0 | 0 | 0 |
| | MF | (Armenia) ARM | Aram Hovsepyan | 1 | 0 | 0 | 0 | 1 | 0 | 0 | 0 | 0 | 0 |

=== Goal scorers ===
| Place | Position | Nation | Number | Name | Premier League | Armenian Cup | Armenian Supercup | UEFA Champions League | Total |
|---|---|---|---|---|---|---|---|---|---|
| 1 | FW | (Armenia) | 7 | Mihran Manasyan | 9 | 3 | 0 | 0 | 12 |
| 2 | MF | (Armenia) | 20 | Artur Yedigaryan | 7 | 4 | 0 | 0 | 11 |
| 2 | FW | (Serbia) | 15 | Uroš Nenadović | 8 | 0 | 0 | 3 | 11 |
| 4 | FW | (Nigeria) | 11 | Sunny Omoregie | 5 | 0 | 0 | 0 | 5 |
| 4 | MF | (Armenia) | 17 | Artak Yedigaryan | 4 | 1 | 0 | 0 | 5 |
| 6 | MF | (Armenia) | 9 | Artak Dashyan | 2 | 2 | 0 | 0 | 4 |
| 7 | MF | (Armenia) | 14 | Artem Simonyan | 3 | 0 | 0 | 0 | 3 |
| 8 | FW | (Trinidad and Tobago) | 77 | Lester Peltier | 2 | 0 | 0 | 0 | 2 |
| 9 | MF | (Armenia) | 10 | Khoren Veranyan | 1 | 0 | 0 | 0 | 1 |
| 9 | DF | (Serbia) | 13 | Miljan Jablan | 0 | 1 | 0 | 0 | 1 |
| 9 | | | | Own goal | 0 | 0 | 0 | 1 | 1 |
| | | | | TOTALS | 44 | 12 | 0 | 4 | 60 |

=== Clean sheets ===
| Place | Position | Nation | Number | Name | Premier League | Armenian Cup | Armenian Supercup | UEFA Champions League | Total |
|---|---|---|---|---|---|---|---|---|---|
| 1 | GK | (Armenia) | 93 | Arsen Beglaryan | 7 | 0 | 0 | 1 | 8 |
| 2 | GK | (Serbia) | 55 | Ognjen Čančarević | 5 | 2 | 0 | 0 | 7 |
| 3 | GK | (North Macedonia) | 90 | Darko Tofiloski | 0 | 1 | 0 | 0 | 1 |
| | | | | TOTALS | 12 | 3 | 0 | 1 | 16 |

=== Disciplinary record ===
| Number | Nation | Position | Name | Premier League | | Armenian Cup | | Armenian Supercup | | UEFA Champions League | | Total | |
| Number | Nation | Position | Name | Yellow card | Red card | Yellow card | Red card | Yellow card | Red card | Yellow card | Red card | Yellow card | Red card |
| 2 | (Armenia) | DF | Taron Voskanyan | 2 | 0 | 0 | 0 | 0 | 0 | 0 | 0 | 2 | 0 |
| 3 | (Armenia) | DF | Andranik Voskanyan | 4 | 1 | 1 | 0 | 1 | 0 | 0 | 0 | 6 | 1 |
| 4 | (Serbia) | DF | Mladen Zeljković | 2 | 0 | 1 | 0 | 0 | 0 | 1 | 0 | 4 | 0 |
| 5 | (Serbia) | DF | Danijel Stojković | 3 | 0 | 0 | 0 | 0 | 0 | 1 | 0 | 4 | 0 |
| 7 | (Armenia) | MF | Mihran Manasyan | 2 | 0 | 0 | 0 | 0 | 0 | 0 | 0 | 2 | 0 |
| 8 | (Armenia) | DF | Gagik Daghbashyan | 3 | 0 | 0 | 0 | 0 | 0 | 0 | 0 | 3 | 0 |
| 9 | (Armenia) | MF | Artak Dashyan | 0 | 0 | 0 | 0 | 0 | 0 | 1 | 0 | 1 | 0 |
| 10 | (Armenia) | MF | Khoren Veranyan | 4 | 1 | 0 | 0 | 0 | 0 | 1 | 0 | 5 | 1 |
| 12 | (Russia) | DF | Konstantin Morozov | 1 | 0 | 0 | 0 | 0 | 0 | 0 | 0 | 1 | 0 |
| 13 | (Croatia) | DF | Dino Škvorc | 2 | 0 | 0 | 0 | 0 | 0 | 0 | 0 | 2 | 0 |
| 14 | (Armenia) | MF | Artem Simonyan | 5 | 0 | 0 | 0 | 0 | 0 | 0 | 0 | 5 | 0 |
| 15 | (Serbia) | FW | Uroš Nenadović | 2 | 0 | 0 | 0 | 0 | 0 | 0 | 0 | 2 | 0 |
| 17 | (Armenia) | MF | Artak Yedigaryan | 1 | 0 | 0 | 0 | 0 | 0 | 1 | 0 | 2 | 0 |
| 18 | (Russia) | MF | Aleksandr Scherbakov | 1 | 0 | 0 | 0 | 0 | 0 | 0 | 0 | 1 | 0 |
| 19 | (Armenia) | DF | Vahagn Minasyan | 2 | 0 | 0 | 0 | 1 | 0 | 0 | 0 | 3 | 0 |
| 20 | (Armenia) | MF | Artur Yedigaryan | 3 | 0 | 0 | 0 | 0 | 0 | 1 | 0 | 4 | 0 |
| 21 | (Armenia) | MF | Artak Grigoryan | 4 | 0 | 0 | 0 | 1 | 0 | 0 | 0 | 5 | 0 |
| 24 | (Russia) | MF | Sergey Serchenkov | 1 | 0 | 0 | 0 | 0 | 0 | 0 | 0 | 1 | 0 |
| 55 | (Serbia) | GK | Ognjen Čančarević | 2 | 0 | 0 | 0 | 0 | 0 | 0 | 0 | 2 | 0 |
| 93 | (Armenia) | GK | Arsen Beglaryan | 2 | 0 | 0 | 0 | 0 | 0 | 0 | 0 | 2 | 0 |
| | (Armenia) | MF | Benik Hovhannisyan | 1 | 0 | 0 | 0 | 0 | 0 | 0 | 0 | 1 | 0 |
Players who left Alashkert during the season:
| 2 | (Ukraine) | DF | Dmytro Khovbosha | 2 | 0 | 0 | 0 | 0 | 0 | 0 | 0 | 2 | 0 |
| 6 | (Armenia) | DF | Ararat Arakelyan | 1 | 0 | 0 | 0 | 0 | 0 | 0 | 0 | 1 | 0 |
| 13 | (Serbia) | DF | Miljan Jablan | 3 | 0 | 0 | 0 | 0 | 0 | 0 | 0 | 3 | 0 |
| 12 | (Armenia) | MF | Karen Muradyan | 2 | 0 | 0 | 0 | 0 | 0 | 0 | 0 | 2 | 0 |
| 77 | (Trinidad and Tobago) | FW | Lester Peltier | 1 | 0 | 1 | 0 | 0 | 0 | 2 | 0 | 4 | 0 |
| | | | TOTALS | 56 | 2 | 3 | 0 | 3 | 0 | 8 | 0 | 70 | 2 |
