= 2017–18 FC Ararat Yerevan season =

Ararat Yerevan
2017–18 season
- Chairman: Hrach Kaprielian
- Manager: Albert Safaryan
- Stadium: Hrazdan Stadium
- Premier League: 6th
- Armenian Cup: Quarterfinal vs Shirak
- Top goalscorer: League: Andranik Kocharyan (9); All: Andranik Kocharyan (9)
Home colours	Away colours	Third colours

The 2017–18 season was FC Ararat Yerevan's 27th consecutive season in Armenian Premier League. They finished the season in sixth and last place, in the Armenian Premier League whilst being knocked out of the Armenian Cup by Shirak at the Quarterfinal stage.

== Season events ==
At the start of July 2017, Ararat Yerevan took Brazilian defender Lucas Straub on trial. In the middle of July, Ararat announced the signing of Lucas Straub and fellow Brazilian Silas.

On 7 December 2017, Lucas Straub and Silas left Ararat after their contracts where terminated by mutual consent, whilst Erik Nazaryan and Revik Yeghiazaryan also left after their contracts expired.

On 13 February, Goran Obradović returned to Ararat Yerevan, having previously played for the club in 2009.

On 14 February 2018, Ararat signed Australian midfielder Anthony Trajkoski, whilst on 23 February, Armenian Youth International Orbeli Hamvardzumyan joined Ararat from Banants.

In March 2018, Ararat signed Andrija Dragojević, Alan Pires and Odaílson on loan from Alashkert until the end of the season.

At the end of the season, Davit Minasyan and Gevorg Ohanyan left Ararat by mutual consent, whilst Goran Obradović left after his contract expired and Andrija Dragojević, Alan Pires and Odaílson returned to Alashkert.

== Squad ==
As of match played 20 May 2018

Number	Name	Nationality	Position	Date of birth (age)	Signed from	Signed in	Contract ends	Apps.	Goals
Goalkeepers
1	Poghos Ayvazyan	(Armenia)	GK	9 June 1995 (aged 22)	Mika	2016		14	0
12	Arman Meliksetyan	(Armenia)	GK	21 July 1995 (aged 22)	Banants	2013		20	0
88	Andrija Dragojević	(Montenegro)	GK	25 December 1991 (aged 26)	loan from Alashkert	2018	2018	11	0
	Edvard Hovhannisyan	(Armenia)	GK	28 February 1990 (aged 28)	Alashkert	2018		0	0
Defenders
2	Arman Zeinalyan	(Armenia)	DF	2 March 1995 (aged 23)	Gandzasar Kapan	2017		1	0
4	Volodya Samsonyan	(Armenia)	DF	24 February 2001 (aged 17)	Youth team	2018		2	0
5	Vardan Arzoyan	(Armenia)	DF	30 April 1995 (aged 23)	Pyunik	2016		47	1
6	Argishti Petrosyan	(Armenia)	DF	16 October 1992 (aged 25)	Homenetmen Beirut	2016		40	0
11	Alan Pires	(Brazil)	DF	4 January 1993 (aged 25)	loan from Alashkert	2018	2018	7	0
20	Rafael Safaryan (captain)	(Armenia)	DF	30 January 1986 (aged 32)		2016			
23	Gor Poghosyan	(Armenia)	DF	11 June 1988 (aged 29)	Kotayk	2017		36	0
25	Goran Obradović	(Serbia)	DF	25 December 1986 (aged 31)	BSK Borča	2016			
	Vahe Chopuryan	(Armenia)	DF	1 December 1997 (aged 20)	Youth team	2018		5	0
	Sergey Mkrtchyan	(Armenia)	DF	20 May 1995 (aged 23)	Ulisses	2016		35	1
Midfielders
3	Anthony Trajkoski	(Australia)	MF	28 April 1998 (aged 20)		2018		6	0
7	Davit Minasyan	(Armenia)	MF	9 March 1993 (aged 25)	Kotayk	2017		37	5
8	Yuri Gareginyan	(Armenia)	MF	3 February 1994 (aged 24)		2015		53	1
10	Garegin Kirakosyan	(Armenia)	MF	26 November 1995 (aged 22)	Kotayk	2017		31	4
14	Armen Derdzyan	(Armenia)	MF	17 November 1993 (aged 24)	Youth team	2017		26	0
15	Odaílson	(Brazil)	MF	20 February 1997 (aged 21)	loan from Alashkert	2018	2018	4	0
21	Andranik Kocharyan (vice-captain)	(Armenia)	MF	29 January 1994 (aged 24)	Kotayk	2017		8	1
	Ruslan Avagyan	(Armenia)	MF	24 June 1995 (aged 22)	Youth team	2016		32	0
	Aram Kocharyan	(Armenia)	MF	5 March 1996 (aged 22)	Banants	2017		11	1
	Gevorg Ohanyan	(Armenia)	MF	29 January 1992 (aged 26)	Homenetmen Beirut	2018			
Forwards
17	Gegham Tumbaryan	(Armenia)	FW	13 May 1996 (aged 22)	Pyunik	2016		50	5
18	Orbeli Hamvardzumyan	(Armenia)	FW	26 March 1996 (aged 22)	Banants	2018		12	3
19	Sargis Metoyan	(Armenia)	FW	6 September 1997 (aged 20)	Dvin Artashat	2016		34	3
	Mikael Arustamyan	(Armenia)	FW	18 January 1996 (aged 22)	Banants	2016		0	0
Away on loan
Left during the season
2	Revik Yeghiazaryan	(Armenia)	DF	1 June 1991 (aged 26)	Kotayk	2017		27	2
3	Gevorg Poghosyan	(Armenia)	DF	26 August 1986 (aged 31)	Alashkert	2016		28	0
4	Aleksandr Petrosyan	(Armenia)	DF	28 May 1986 (aged 31)	Gandzasar Kapan	2017			
11	David G. Grigoryan	(Armenia)	MF	17 July 1989 (aged 28)	Mika	2017			
15	Artur Stepanyan	(Armenia)	DF	17 November 1999 (aged 18)	Youth team	2017		13	0
18	Silas	(Brazil)	MF	31 March 1993 (aged 25)		2017		7	0
22	Arsen Petrosyan	(Armenia)	GK	27 September 1991 (aged 26)	Ganshoren	2017		5	0
25	Lucas Straub	(Brazil)	DF	6 April 1995 (aged 23)		2017		7	0

== Transfers ==
=== In ===
Date	Position	Nationality	Name	From	Fee	Ref.
Summer 2017	FW	(Brazil)	William Martins	Unknown	Free	
1 July 2017	DF	(Armenia)	Aleksandr Petrosyan	Gandzasar Kapan	Free	
1 July 2017	MF	(Armenia)	Arman Zeinalyan	Gandzasar Kapan	Free	
8 July 2017	GK	(Armenia)	Arsen Petrosyan	Ganshoren	Undisclosed	
16 July 2017	DF	(Brazil)	Lucas Straub	Unknown	Free	
16 July 2017	MF	(Brazil)	Silas	Unknown	Free	
4 August 2017	DF	(Armenia)	Aram Kocharyan	Banants	Undisclosed	
10 February 2018	FW	(Armenia)	Gevorg Ohanyan	Homenetmen Beirut	Undisclosed	
13 February 2018	DF	(Serbia)	Goran Obradović	BSK Borča	Undisclosed	
14 February 2018	MF	(Australia)	Anthony Trajkoski	Unattached	Free	
23 February 2018	FW	(Armenia)	Orbeli Hamvardzumyan	Banants	Undisclosed	
28 February 2018	GK	(Armenia)	Edvard Hovhannisyan	Alashkert	Undisclosed	

=== Loans in ===
Start date	Position	Nationality	Name	From	End date	Ref.
1 March 2018	GK	(Montenegro)	Andrija Dragojević	Alashkert	End of Season	
1 March 2018	DF	(Brazil)	Alan Pires	Alashkert	End of Season	
1 March 2018	MF	(Brazil)	Odaílson	Alashkert	End of Season	

=== Released ===
Date	Position	Nationality	Name	Joined	Date	Ref.
7 December 2017	DF	(Armenia)	Erik Nazaryan			
7 December 2017	DF	(Armenia)	Revik Yeghiazaryan			
7 December 2017	DF	(Brazil)	Lucas Straub			
7 December 2017	MF	(Brazil)	Silas			
31 December 2017	GK	(Armenia)	Arsen Petrosyan	Alashkert		
31 December 2017	DF	(Armenia)	Gevorg Poghosyan	Homenetmen Beirut		
31 December 2017	MF	(Armenia)	Karen Avoyan			
31 December 2017	MF	(Armenia)	David G. Grigoryan			
31 December 2017	MF	(Armenia)	Aram Hovsepyan			
31 December 2017	MF	(Armenia)	Artur Stepanyan			
31 December 2017	FW	(Armenia)	Hovhannes Hovhannisyan			
31 December 2017	FW	(Armenia)	Aleksandr Petrosyan	Alashkert		
31 December 2017	FW	(Brazil)	William Martins			
15 June 2018	DF	(Serbia)	Goran Obradović	Al-Mina'a		
15 June 2018	MF	(Armenia)	Davit Minasyan	Gandzasar Kapan		
15 June 2018	MF	(Armenia)	Gevorg Ohanyan	Gandzasar Kapan		
30 June 2018	MF	(Armenia)	Yuri Gareginyan	Artsakh		
30 June 2018	MF	(Armenia)	Aram Kocharyan	Lokomotiv Yerevan		

=== Trialists ===
Date From	Position	Nationality	Name	Previous club	Date To	Ref.
3 July 2017	DF	(Brazil)	Lucas Straub			

== Friendlies ==
15 July 2017	Ararat Yerevan (Armenia)	1 – 2	(Iran) Esteghlal	Yerevan
(UTC+4)	Goal	Report	Goal	Stadium: FFA Academy Stadium

23 July 2017	Ararat Yerevan	0 – 0	Artsakh	Yerevan
(UTC+4)		Report

25 July 2017	Ararat Yerevan	2 – 2	Pyunik	Yerevan
(UTC+4)	A.Kocharyan; A.Petrosyan	Report	Avetisyan	Stadium: FAA Stadium

== Competitions ==
=== Premier League ===
==== Results summary ====
Overall								Home						Away					
Pld	W	D	L	GF	GA	GD	Pts	W	D	L	GF	GA	GD	W	D	L	GF	GA	GD
30	5	6	19	33	65	−32	21	2	4	9	19	33	−14	3	2	10	14	32	−18

==== Results by round ====
Round	1	2	3	4	5	6	7	8	9	10	11	12	13	14	15	16	17	18	19	20	21	22	23	24	25	26	27	28	29	30
Ground	A	A	H	A	H	H	H	H	A	A	A	H	A	A	H	H	H	A	H	A	A	A	H	A	H	H	H	A	H	A
Result	W	L	D	L	L	L	L	D	D	L	L	L	W	L	L	W	L	D	L	L	L	L	D	L	W	L	L	W	D	L
Position	1	4	4	4	5	6	6	5	5	6	6	6	6	6	6	6	6	6	6	6	6	6	6	6	6	6	6	6	6	6

Updated to match(es) played on 20 May 2018. Source: See Results
A = Away; H = Home; W = Win; D = Draw; L = Loss

==== Results ====
6 August 2017 1	Gandzasar Kapan	1 – 3	Ararat Yerevan	Yerevan
19:00 (UTC+4)	Junior 45'; Musonda (yellow card) 88'	Report	R.Yeghiazaryan (yellow card) 56'; An.Kocharyan 59', 67' (pen.); D.Minasyan 64'; R.Safaryan (yellow card) 79'; S.Metoyan (yellow card) 88'	Stadium: Vazgen Sargsyan Republican Stadium; Attendance: 300; Referee: Suren Baliyan

12 August 2017 2	Alashkert	3 – 0	Ararat Yerevan	Yerevan
18:00 (UTC+4)	Grigoryan (yellow card) 25'; Manasyan 36', 63'; Artu.Yedigaryan 75'	Report	R.Yeghiazaryan (yellow card) 12'; Go.Poghosyan (yellow card) 34'	Stadium: Alashkert Stadium; Attendance: 500; Referee: Suren Baliyan

20 August 2017 3	Ararat Yerevan	0 – 0	Pyunik	Yerevan
17:00 (UTC+4)	Al.Petrosyan (yellow card) 45'; G.Kirakosyan (yellow card) 90+4'	Report	R.Hakobyan (yellow card) 35'	Stadium: Mika Stadium; Attendance: 650; Referee: Zaven Hovhannisyan

26 August 2017 4	Shirak	2 – 1	Ararat Yerevan	Gyumri
17:00 (UTC+4)	Udo 45'; M.Kaba (yellow card) 55'; A.Mikaelyan (yellow card) 64'; Kpodo (yellow card) 66'; Ilić 87'	Report	V.Arzoyan (yellow card) 15'; R.Yeghiazaryan 51'; S.Mkrtchyan (yellow card) 54'	Stadium: Gyumri City Stadium; Attendance: 300; Referee: Artur Safaryan

9 September 2017 5	Ararat Yerevan	1 – 2	Banants	Yerevan
16:00 (UTC+4)	An.Kocharyan 31' (pen.); R.Safaryan (yellow card) 81'; Ar.Kocharyan (yellow card) 90+5'	Report	M.Guydanov (yellow card) 17'; Krasić (yellow card) 20'; Hovsepyan 46' (yellow card) 66'; A.Avagyan (yellow card) 58'; V.Ayvazyan 68'; Đoković (yellow card) 90+5'	Stadium: Mika Stadium; Attendance: 300; Referee: Artur Simonyan

17 September 2017 6	Ararat Yerevan	0 – 2	Gandzasar Kapan	Yerevan
16:00 (UTC+4)	G.Tumbaryan (yellow card) 65'; G.Kirakosyan (yellow card) 66'; Silas (yellow card) 88'; Arg.Petrosyan (yellow card) 90+1'	Report	H.Ishkhanyan 25'; A.Khachatryan (yellow card) 30'; Živković (yellow card) 45'; Musonda 75'	Stadium: Mika Stadium; Attendance: 300; Referee: Artur Simonyan

27 September 2017 7	Ararat Yerevan	1 – 3	Alashkert	Yerevan
16:00 (UTC+4)	Al.Petrosyan 18'; Gareginyan (yellow card) 42'; An.Kocharyan (yellow card) 50'	Report	Muradyan (yellow card) 52'; Ar.Yedigaryan 75' (pen.); Nenadović 78', 90'	Stadium: Mika Stadium; Attendance: 400; Referee: Gevorg Eghoyan

30 September 2017 8	Pyunik	–	Ararat Yerevan	Yerevan
(UTC+4)		Report		Stadium: Vazgen Sargsyan Republican Stadium

13 October 2017 9	Ararat Yerevan	2 – 2	Shirak	Yerevan
15:00 (UTC+4)	R.Safaryan (yellow card) 30'; Ar.Kocharyan 44'; G. Kirakosyan 39'	Report	Stanojević 35' (pen.); A.Muradyan 39'; A.Mikaelyan (yellow card) 73'	Stadium: Mika Stadium; Attendance: 300; Referee: Gevorg Eghoyan

20 October 2017 10	Banants	0 – 0	Ararat Yerevan	Yerevan
15:00 (UTC+4)	Krasić (yellow card) 36'; K.Sibo (yellow card) 63'; Wal (yellow card) 68'; Hovsepyan (yellow card) 72'	Report		Stadium: Banants Stadium; Attendance: 300; Referee: Artur Simonyan

29 October 2017 11	Gandzasar Kapan	2 – 0	Ararat Yerevan	Yerevan
18:00 (UTC+4)	G.Harutyunyan 12'; Musonda 76'	Report		Stadium: Vazgen Sargsyan Republican Stadium; Attendance: 100

3 November 2017 12	Alashkert	2 – 0	Ararat Yerevan	Yerevan
15:00 (UTC+4)	M.Manasyan 45+1', 70'; Zeljković (yellow card) 74'	Report	S.Mkrtchyan (yellow card) 38'	Stadium: Alashkert Stadium; Attendance: 300; Referee: Zaven Hovhannisyan

19 November 2017 13	Ararat Yerevan	0 – 1	Pyunik	Yerevan
15:00 (UTC+4)	S.Metoyan (yellow card) 43'; An.Kocharyan (yellow card) 83'	Report	Avetisyan (yellow card) 37'; A.Manucharyan (yellow card) 46' (yellow-red card) 73'; A.Shakhnazaryan (yellow card) 75'; Miranyan 76'	Stadium: Alashkert Stadium; Attendance: 300; Referee: Artur Simonyan

25 November 2017 14	Shirak	0 – 1	Ararat Yerevan	Gyumri
15:00 (UTC+4)	A.Muradyan (yellow card) 49'	Report	An.Kocharyan 90+1'	Stadium: Gyumri City Stadium; Attendance: 120; Referee: Artur Safaryan

29 November 2017 8	Pyunik	4 – 0	Ararat Yerevan	Yerevan
16:00 (UTC+4)	R.Minasyan 8'; Mkrtchyan 27' (yellow card) 69'; R.Yeghiazaryan 42' (o.g.); A.Manucharyan (yellow card) 55'; V.Hayrapetyan (yellow card) 60'; A.Arakelyan (yellow card) 77'; Avetisyan 90+1'	Report	Gareginyan (yellow card) 62'	Stadium: Vazgen Sargsyan Republican Stadium; Attendance: 300

3 December 2017 15	Ararat Yerevan	2 – 3	Banants	Yerevan
14:00 (UTC+4)	V.Chopuryan (yellow card) 15'; G.Kirakosyan 17', 90+2'; R.Avagyan (yellow card) 76'	Report	K.Sibo (yellow card) 17'; Hovsepyan 32', 70'; H.Voskanyan (yellow card) 57'; Wal 90+4' (pen.)	Stadium: Alashkert Stadium; Attendance: 300; Referee: Henrik Nalbandyan

28 February 2018 16	Ararat Yerevan	1 – 0	Gandzasar Kapan	Yerevan
14:00 (UTC+4)	G.Kirakosyan (yellow card) 62'; D.Minasyan 77'; Obradović (yellow card) 81'	Report	Wbeymar (yellow card) 54'; V.Pogosyan (yellow card) 62'	Stadium: Banants Artificial Field; Attendance: 500; Referee: Artur Safaryan

4 March 2018 17	Ararat Yerevan	2 – 3	Alashkert	Yerevan
14:00 (UTC+4)	O.Hamvardzumyan 51'; An.Kocharyan 74'; R.Safaryan (yellow card) 76'	Report	Simonyan 12' (pen.); Omoregie 37', 49'; S.Serchenkov (yellow card) 54'; A.Scherbakov (yellow card) 70'	Stadium: Alashkert Stadium; Attendance: 300; Referee: Gevorg Eghoyan

11 March 2018 18	Pyunik	3 – 3	Ararat Yerevan	Yerevan
14:00 (UTC+4)	Diarrassouba 17', 57'; R.Hakobyan 25'; A.Manucharyan (yellow card) 48'	Report	G.Ohanyan 52'; R.Safaryan (yellow card) 55'; Obradović (yellow card) 74'; O.Hamvardzumyan 77', 90'	Stadium: Vazgen Sargsyan Republican Stadium; Attendance: 300

18 March 2018 19	Ararat Yerevan	0 – 2	Shirak	Yerevan
14:00 (UTC+4)	O.Hamvardzumyan (yellow card) 41'; V.Arzoyan (yellow card) 47'	Report	Udo 47' (pen.); V.Bakalyan 71'	Stadium: Alashkert Stadium; Attendance: 400; Referee: Suren Baliyan

1 April 2018 20	Banants	2 – 0	Ararat Yerevan	Yerevan
15:00 (UTC+4)	Wal 23' (pen.); H.Voskanyan (yellow card) 45'; H. Hakobyan (yellow card) 70'; Peltier 72' (pen.)	Report	Dragojević (yellow card) 22'; An.Kocharyan (yellow card) 63'; Obradović (yellow card) 69'; Alan (yellow card) 71'	Stadium: Banants Stadium; Attendance: 500; Referee: Artur Safaryan

4 April 2018 21	Gandzasar Kapan	3 – 1	Ararat Yerevan	Yerevan
13:00 (UTC+4)	G.Harutyunyan (yellow card) 5' (goal) 10'; Musonda 24'; Yuspashyan (yellow card) 76'; Wirikom 90+2'	Report	Obradović 47'; V.Arzoyan (yellow card) 58'; O.Hamvardzumyan (yellow card) 70'	Stadium: Banants Stadium; Attendance: 200; Referee: Zaven Hovhannisyan

7 April 2018 22	Alashkert	2 – 1	Ararat Yerevan	Yerevan
16:00 (UTC+4)	Arta.Yedigaryan 1', 11'; Čančarević (yellow card) 90+3'	Report	R.Avagyan (yellow card) 26'; G.Ohanyan 45+2'	Stadium: Alashkert Stadium

15 April 2018 23	Ararat Yerevan	1 – 1	Pyunik	Yerevan
17:00 (UTC+4)	G.Ohanyan 45+1'	Report	Burayev 2'	Stadium: Alashkert Stadium; Attendance: 100; Referee: Artur Simonyan

21 April 2018 24	Shirak	4 – 1	Ararat Yerevan	Gyumri
17:00 (UTC+4)	A.Muradyan 9', 21'; A.Davoyan 33'; Ly (yellow card) 62'; V.Bakalyan (yellow card) 76'; Z.Margaryan 89'	Report	V.Chopuryan (yellow card) 26'; A.Petrosyan (yellow card) 58'; Gareginyan 68'; Dragojević (yellow card) 76'	Stadium: Gyumri City Stadium; Attendance: 350; Referee: Gevorg Eghoyan

28 April 2018 25	Ararat Yerevan	2 – 1	Banants	Yerevan
17:00 (UTC+4)	An.Kocharyan 56', 86' (pen.)	Report	Wal 24'	Stadium: Alashkert Stadium; Attendance: 300; Referee: Artur Safaryan

1 May 2018 26	Ararat Yerevan	1 – 6	Gandzasar Kapan	Yerevan
17:00 (UTC+4)	G.Ohanyan (yellow card) 25'; An.Kocharyan (yellow card) 41'; G.Kirakosyan 80'; S.Mkrtchyan (yellow card) 84'	Report	G.Harutyunyan 48', 53', 57', 85'; H.Velic 73'; M.Grigoryan 76'	Stadium: Alashkert Stadium; Attendance: 250; Referee: Gevorg Eghoyan

5 May 2018 27	Ararat Yerevan	2 – 3	Alashkert	Yerevan
17:00 (UTC+4)	G.Ohanyan 16'; D.Minasyan 57'; R.Avagyan (yellow card) 88'	Report	Omoregie 25'; Grigoryan (yellow card) 32'; M.Manasyan 47'; Dashyan 71'	Stadium: Alashkert Stadium; Attendance: 200; Referee: Artur Safaryan

8 May 2018 28	Pyunik	1 – 3	Ararat Yerevan	Yerevan
17:00 (UTC+4)	Vardanyan 1'	Report	Obradović (yellow card) 44'; S.Metoyan 70', 84' (yellow card) 89'; G.Tumbaryan 87'	Stadium: Vazgen Sargsyan Republican Stadium; Attendance: 100; Referee: Zaven Hovhannisyan

12 May 2018 29	Ararat Yerevan	4 – 4	Shirak	Yerevan
17:00 (UTC+4)	An.Kocharyan 43', 71'; D.Minasyan 54'; R.Darbinyan 61' (o.g.)	Report	Stanojević 5'; V.Bakalyan 7'; M.Bakayoko 19'; Prljević 27'; Z.Margaryan (yellow card) 82'	Stadium: Alashkert Stadium; Attendance: 300; Referee: Suren Baliyan

20 May 2018 30	Banants	2 – 0	Ararat Yerevan	Yerevan
17:00 (UTC+4)	Hovsepyan 7'; Peltier 26'; A.Bareghamyan (yellow card) 85'	Report	G.Ohanyan (yellow card) 78'	Stadium: Banants Stadium; Attendance: 150; Referee: Gevorg Eghoyan

==== Table ====
Pos	Team	Pld	W	D	L	GF	GA	GD	Pts	Qualification
1	Alashkert (C)	30	14	8	8	44	31	+13	50	Qualification for the Champions League first qualifying round
2	Banants	30	11	11	8	42	34	+8	44	Qualification for the Europa League first qualifying round (Note: Gandzasar Kapan qualified for the Europa League first qualifying round by winning the 2017–18 Armenian Cup.)
3	Gandzasar Kapan	30	11	10	9	43	34	+9	43	Qualification for the Europa League first qualifying round
4	Shirak	30	14	8	8	37	31	+6	38 (Note: Shirak were deducted 12 points on decision of Disciplinary Committee, upheld on May 18, due to match fixing scandal.)	
5	Pyunik	30	9	9	12	37	41	−4	36	Qualification for the Europa League first qualifying round
6	Ararat Yerevan	30	5	6	19	33	65	−32	21	

Source: Soccerway
Rules for classification: 1) Points; 2) Play-off (only if deciding champion); 3) Matches won; 4) Head-to-head points; 5) Head-to-head matches won; 6) Head-to-head goal difference; 7) Head-to-head goals scored; 8) Head-to-head away goals scored; 9) Goal difference; 10) Goals scored.
(C) Champions

=== Armenian Cup ===
13 September 2017 Quarterfinal 1st leg	Shirak	1 – 1	Ararat Yerevan	Gyumri
16:00 (UTC+4)	M.Bakayoko 12'; A.Amiryan (yellow card) 43'; R.Darbinyan (yellow card) 89'; Ilić (yellow card) 90+2'	Report	R.Safaryan 61'	Stadium: Gyumri City Stadium; Attendance: 100; Referee: Gevorg Eghoyan

25 October 2017 Quarterfinal 2nd leg	Ararat Yerevan	0 – 2 (1 – 3 agg.)	Shirak	Yerevan
15:00 (UTC+4)	G.Kirakosyan (yellow card) 63'; R.Safaryan (yellow card) 85'	Report	V.Bakalyan 65'; M.Bakayoko 69' (yellow card) 90+1'	Stadium: Alashkert Stadium; Attendance: 20; Referee: Artur Simonyan

== Statistics ==
As of match played 20 May 2018

=== Appearances and goals ===
No.	Pos	Nat	Player	Total		Premier League		Armenian Cup	
No.	Pos	Nat	Player	Apps	Goals	Apps	Goals	Apps	Goals
1	GK	(Armenia) ARM	Poghos Ayvazyan	5	0	5	0	0	0
2	DF	(Armenia) ARM	Arman Zeinalyan	1	0	0+1	0	0	0
4	DF	(Armenia) ARM	Volodya Samsonyan	2	0	0+2	0	0	0
3	MF	(Australia) AUS	Anthony Trajkoski	6	0	2+4	0	0	0
5	DF	(Armenia) ARM	Vardan Arzoyan	27	0	25+1	0	1	0
6	DF	(Armenia) ARM	Argishti Petrosyan	14	0	11+2	0	0+1	0
7	MF	(Armenia) ARM	Davit Minasyan	26	4	18+7	4	0+1	0
8	MF	(Armenia) ARM	Yuri Gareginyan	27	1	25+1	1	1	0
10	MF	(Armenia) ARM	Garegin Kirakosyan	23	4	7+15	4	1	0
11	DF	(Brazil) BRA	Alan Pires	7	0	5+2	0	0	0
12	GK	(Armenia) ARM	Arman Meliksetyan	10	0	9	0	1	0
14	MF	(Armenia) ARM	Armen Derdzyan	16	0	11+5	0	0	0
15	MF	(Brazil) BRA	Odaílson	4	0	2+2	0	0	0
17	FW	(Armenia) ARM	Gegham Tumbaryan	20	1	7+13	1	0	0
18	FW	(Armenia) ARM	Orbeli Hamvardzumyan	12	3	6+6	3	0	0
19	FW	(Armenia) ARM	Sargis Metoyan	18	2	8+9	2	1	0
20	DF	(Armenia) ARM	Rafael Safaryan	27	1	26	0	1	1
21	MF	(Armenia) ARM	Andranik Kocharyan	30	9	27+2	9	1	0
23	DF	(Armenia) ARM	Gor Poghosyan	23	0	22+1	0	0	0
25	DF	(Serbia) SRB	Goran Obradović	12	1	12	1	0	0
88	GK	(Montenegro) MNE	Andrija Dragojević	11	0	11	0	0	0
	DF	(Armenia) ARM	Vahe Chopuryan	5	0	5	0	0	0
	DF	(Armenia) ARM	Sergey Mkrtchyan	22	0	19+2	0	1	0
	MF	(Armenia) ARM	Ruslan Avagyan	17	0	12+5	0	0	0
	MF	(Armenia) ARM	Aram Kocharyan	11	1	7+4	1	0	0
	MF	(Armenia) ARM	Gevorg Ohanyan	15	4	14+1	4	0	0
Players who left Ararat Yerevan during the season:
2	DF	(Armenia) ARM	Revik Yeghiazaryan	15	1	13+1	1	1	0
3	DF	(Armenia) ARM	Gevorg Poghosyan	1	0	0+1	0	0	0
4	DF	(Armenia) ARM	Aleksandr Petrosyan	7	1	6	1	0+1	0
11	MF	(Armenia) ARM	David G. Grigoryan	1	0	1	0	0	0
15	DF	(Armenia) ARM	Artur Stepanyan	3	0	0+3	0	0	0
18	MF	(Brazil) BRA	Silas	7	0	3+3	0	1	0
22	GK	(Armenia) ARM	Arsen Petrosyan	5	0	5	0	0	0
25	DF	(Brazil) BRA	Lucas Straub	7	0	6	0	1	0

=== Goal scorers ===
Place	Position	Nation	Number	Name	Premier League	Armenian Cup	Total
1	MF	(Armenia)	21	Andranik Kocharyan	9	0	9
2	FW	(Armenia)	10	Garegin Kirakosyan	4	0	4
2	MF	(Armenia)		Gevorg Ohanyan	4	0	4
2	MF	(Armenia)	7	Davit Minasyan	4	0	4
5	FW	(Armenia)	18	Orbeli Hamvardzumyan	3	0	3
6	FW	(Armenia)	19	Sargis Metoyan	2	0	2
7	DF	(Armenia)	2	Revik Yeghiazaryan	1	0	1
7	FW	(Armenia)	4	Aleksandr Petrosyan	1	0	1
7	MF	(Armenia)		Aram Kocharyan	1	0	1
7	DF	(Serbia)	25	Goran Obradović	1	0	1
7	MF	(Armenia)	8	Yuri Gareginyan	1	0	1
7	MF	(Armenia)	17	Gegham Tumbaryan	1	0	1
7	DF	(Armenia)	20	Rafael Safaryan	0	1	1
7				Own goal	1	0	1
				TOTALS	30	1	31

=== Clean sheets ===
Place	Position	Nation	Number	Name	Premier League	Armenian Cup	Total
1	GK	(Armenia)	12	Arman Meliksetyan	2	0	2
2	GK	(Armenia)	22	Arsen Petrosyan	1	0	1
2	GK	(Montenegro)	88	Andrija Dragojević	1	0	1
				TOTALS	4	0	4

=== Disciplinary record ===
Number	Nation	Position	Name	Premier League		Armenian Cup		Total	
Number	Nation	Position	Name	Yellow card	Red card	Yellow card	Red card	Yellow card	Red card
5	(Armenia)	DF	Vardan Arzoyan	3	0	0	0	3	0
6	(Armenia)	DF	Argishti Petrosyan	2	0	0	0	2	0
8	(Armenia)	MF	Yuri Gareginyan	2	0	0	0	2	0
10	(Armenia)	FW	Garegin Kirakosyan	3	0	0	0	3	0
11	(Brazil)	DF	Alan Pires	1	0	0	0	1	0
17	(Armenia)	FW	Gegham Tumbaryan	1	0	0	0	1	0
18	(Armenia)	FW	Orbeli Hamvardzumyan	2	0	0	0	2	0
19	(Armenia)	FW	Sargis Metoyan	3	0	0	0	3	0
20	(Armenia)	DF	Rafael Safaryan	5	0	0	0	5	0
21	(Armenia)	MF	Andranik Kocharyan	4	0	0	0	4	0
23	(Armenia)	DF	Gor Poghosyan	1	0	0	0	1	0
25	(Serbia)	DF	Goran Obradović	4	0	0	0	4	0
88	(Montenegro)	GK	Andrija Dragojević	2	0	0	0	2	0
	(Armenia)	DF	Vahe Chopuryan	2	0	0	0	2	0
	(Armenia)	DF	Sergey Mkrtchyan	3	0	0	0	3	0
	(Armenia)	MF	Ruslan Avagyan	3	0	0	0	3	0
	(Armenia)	MF	Aram Kocharyan	1	0	0	0	1	0
	(Armenia)	MF	Gevorg Ohanyan	2	0	0	0	2	0
Players who left Ararat Yerevan during the season:
2	(Armenia)	DF	Revik Yeghiazaryan	2	0	0	0	2	0
4	(Armenia)	DF	Aleksandr Petrosyan	1	0	0	0	1	0
18	(Brazil)	MF	Silas	1	0	0	0	1	0
			TOTALS	48	0	0	0	48	0
