= 2014 FC Spartak Semey season =

FC Spartak Semey
2014 season
- Manager: Almas Kulshinbayev
- Stadium: Spartak Stadium
- Kazakhstan Premier League: 12th (Relegated)
- Kazakhstan Cup: First Round vs Lashyn

The 2014 FC Spartak Semey season was the club's 1st season back in the Kazakhstan Premier League, the highest tier of association football in Kazakhstan, since 2004 and their 14th season in total. Spartak Semey finished the season in 12th position and were relegated back to the Kazakhstan First Division whilst also being knocked out of the Kazakhstan Cup at the First Round by FC Lashyn.

== Squad ==
Note: Flags indicate national team as defined under FIFA eligibility rules; some limited exceptions apply. Players may hold more than one non-FIFA nationality.

No.	Pos.	Nation	Player
2	MF	BLR	Filip Rudzik
8	MF	KAZ	Yerkebulan Nurgaliyev
11	FW	KAZ	Stanislav Akhmetov
13	DF	KAZ	Ilyas Amirseitov
14	MF	KAZ	Alibek Sakenov
15	FW	KAZ	Timur Muldinov
17	DF	KAZ	Evgeni Ovshinov
18	MF	KAZ	Maksim Azovskiy
19	MF	KAZ	Azat Yersalimov
20	DF	KGZ	Sergey Kutsov
24	FW	KAZ	Artur Terekhin
26	DF	KAZ	Nurlan Akinzhanov

No.	Pos.	Nation	Player
29	GK	KAZ	Sergey Boychenko
30	GK	KAZ	Daniil Rikhard
31	MF	SRB	Goran Obradović (loan from Gandzasar Kapan)
32	DF	ARM	Artur Avagyan (loan from Gandzasar Kapan)
40	MF	KAZ	Serik Sagindikov
52	DF	BUL	Viktor Genev
71	MF	BUL	Nikolay Dyulgerov
77	MF	BUL	Daniel Peev
84	FW	SRB	Nemanja Jovanović
91	MF	KAZ	Baghdat Nurlibayev
92	MF	KAZ	Valdislav Akhmeyev
93	MF	KAZ	Zhalyn Zhaksylykov

== Transfers ==
=== Winter ===
In: Note: Flags indicate national team as defined under FIFA eligibility rules; some limited exceptions apply. Players may hold more than one non-FIFA nationality.

No.	Pos.	Nation	Player
17	DF	KAZ	Yevgeni Ovshinov (from Kazakhstan Atyrau)
18	MF	KAZ	Maksim Azovskiy (from Kazakhstan Zhetysu)
20	DF	KGZ	Sergey Kutsov (from Kazakhstan Atyrau)
29	GK	KAZ	Sergey Boychenko (from Kazakhstan Atyrau)
31	MF	SRB	Goran Obradović
52	DF	BUL	Viktor Genev (from Bulgaria Slavia Sofia)
71	MF	BUL	Nikolay Dyulgerov (from Bulgaria CSKA Sofia)
77	MF	BUL	Daniel Peev (from Bulgaria Lokomotiv Sofia)
84	FW	SRB	Nemanja Jovanović (from Norway Sandnes Ulf)
—	MF	SRB	Nemanja Čović (from Serbia Donji Srem)

Out: Note: Flags indicate national team as defined under FIFA eligibility rules; some limited exceptions apply. Players may hold more than one non-FIFA nationality.

No.	Pos.	Nation	Player

=== Summer ===
In: Note: Flags indicate national team as defined under FIFA eligibility rules; some limited exceptions apply. Players may hold more than one non-FIFA nationality.

No.	Pos.	Nation	Player
2	MF	BLR	Filip Rudzik (loan from Kazakhstan Atyrau)
31	MF	SRB	Goran Obradović (loan from Armenia Gandzasar Kapan)
32	DF	ARM	Artur Avagyan (loan from Armenia Gandzasar Kapan)

Out: Note: Flags indicate national team as defined under FIFA eligibility rules; some limited exceptions apply. Players may hold more than one non-FIFA nationality.

No.	Pos.	Nation	Player
—	MF	SRB	Nemanja Čović (from Serbia Proleter Novi Sad)

== Competitions ==
=== Kazakhstan Premier League ===
==== First round ====
===== Results summary =====
Overall								Home						Away					
Pld	W	D	L	GF	GA	GD	Pts	W	D	L	GF	GA	GD	W	D	L	GF	GA	GD
22	3	5	14	16	41	−25	14	3	4	4	11	13	−2	0	1	10	5	28	−23

Last updated: 27 March 2015.
Source: Soccerway

===== Results =====
15 March 2014 1	Tobol	2 – 1	Spartak Semey	Kostanay
14:00 (UTC+6)	Kučera (yellow card) 71'; Bogdanov 78' (yellow card) 79'; O.Krasić 80'; Jeslínek (yellow card) 85'	Summary	Samchenko (yellow card) 12'; Azovskiy 68'; Kutsov (yellow card) 85'	Stadium: Central Stadium; Attendance: 3,700; Referee: Askhat Abdanbayev

22 March 2014 2	Spartak Semey	0 – 0	Irtysh	Semey
13:00 (UTC+6)	Samchenko (yellow card) 17'	Summary		Stadium: Spartak Stadium; Attendance: 1,200; Referee: Akmalkhan Kholmatov

29 March 2014 3	Aktobe	3 – 0	Spartak Semey	Aktobe
16:00 (UTC+6)	Zyankovich 17', 58'; Shabalin 47'; D.Miroshnichenko (yellow card) 89'	Summary	S.Sagindikov (yellow card) 34'; I.Amirseitov (yellow card) 59'; M.Samchenko (yellow card) 64'	Stadium: Central Stadium; Attendance: 5,000; Referee: Aleksandr Aliyev

5 April 2014 4	Spartak Semey	0 – 1	Shakhter Karagandy	Semey
14:00 (UTC+6)	S.Sagindikov (yellow card) 19'; B.Turysbek (yellow card) 44' (red card) 45+2'; Dyulgerov (yellow card) 65'; Azovskiy (yellow card) 69'	Summary	Vičius (yellow card) 9'; T.Zhangylyshbai (yellow card) 27'; Vasiljević 29'; Yago (red card) 45+2'; Konysbayev (yellow card) 56'	Stadium: Spartak Stadium; Attendance: 1,000; Referee: Aleksandr Gauzer

9 April 2014 5	Taraz	2 – 0	Spartak Semey	Taraz
16:00 (UTC+6)	Skorykh 58'; Shchetkin 71'	Summary		Stadium: Central Stadium; Attendance: 2,600; Referee: Viktor Antonov

13 April 2014 6	Atyrau	2 – 1	Spartak Semey	Atyrau
16:00 (UTC+6)	Rudzik 8' (pen.); Savio (yellow card) 40'; Karpovich (yellow card) 61'; Essame (yellow card) 79'; Gridin 87'	Summary	S.Sagindikov (yellow card) 15'; Čović 61'; Dyulgerov (yellow card) 80'	Stadium: Munaishy Stadium; Attendance: 6,500; Referee: Bolat Karlibayev

19 April 2014 7	Spartak Semey	1 – 1	Zhetysu	Semey
16:00 (UTC+6)	Genev (yellow card) 65'; Kovačević 68'	Summary	B.Tatishev 5'; Kovalev (yellow card) 76'	Stadium: Spartak Stadium; Attendance: 1,000; Referee: Bagdat Abdullaev

27 April 2014 8	Ordabasy	2 – 1	Spartak Semey	Shymkent
16:00 (UTC+6)	Mwesigwa 44', 73'; Ashirbekov (yellow card) 74'; Kasyanov (yellow card) 77'	Summary	A.Sakenov (yellow card) 54'; Kutsov (yellow card) 61'; Čović 65'; S.Sagindikov (yellow card) 72'	Stadium: Kazhimukan Munaitpasov Stadium; Attendance: 3,000; Referee: Akmalkhan Kholmatov

1 May 2014 9	Spartak Semey	1 – 1	Kaisar	Semey
16:00 (UTC+6)	Dyulgerov (yellow card) 19'; A.Sakenov (yellow card) 65'; Jovanović 73'; Kutsov (yellow card) 85'	Summary	Strukov 57'; R.Rozybakiev (yellow card) 65'; Savić (yellow card) 90+1'	Stadium: Spartak Stadium; Attendance: 4,500; Referee: Igor Khisamutdinov

6 May 2014 10	Astana	5 – 0	Spartak Semey	Astana
19:00 (UTC+6)	Nusserbayev 15', 52'; Kurdov (yellow card) 42'; Dmitrenko 72'; Kéthévoama 76'; Cícero 89'	Summary	A.Sakenov (yellow card) 33'; Kutsov (yellow card) 36'; Samchenko (yellow card) 37'	Stadium: Astana Arena; Attendance: 1,500; Referee: Aydin Rakhimbayev

10 May 2014 11	Spartak Semey	2 – 5	Kairat	Semey
16:00 (UTC+6)	Čović 20'; Jovanović 59'; Azovskiy (yellow card) 70'; B.Turysbek (yellow card) 72'	Summary	Ceesay 17' (pen.), 69'; Marković 22' (yellow card) 39'; Knežević 52'; A.Darabayev 55'	Stadium: Spartak Stadium; Attendance: 5,000; Referee: Bolat Karlibayev

18 May 2014 12	Irtysh	5 – 0	Spartak Semey	Pavlodar
17:00 (UTC+6)	I.Yurin 13'; Dudchenko 21'; Chichulin 38' (pen.); A.Ayaganov 41'; Z.Korobov (yellow card) 50' (goal) 90'	Summary	Azovskiy (red card) 38'; Dyulgerov (yellow card) 70'	Stadium: Central Stadium; Attendance: 2,000; Referee: Aleksandr Aliyev

24 May 2014 13	Spartak Semey	0 – 1	Aktobe	Semey
14:00 (UTC+6)		Summary	Arzumanyan (yellow card) 8'; Pizzelli 68'; Shabalin (yellow card) 88'	Stadium: Spartak Stadium; Attendance: 3,000; Referee: Igor Aleshin

28 May 2014 14	Shakhter Karagandy	1 – 0	Spartak Semey	Karagandy
18:30 (UTC+6)	Vičius 9'; Vasiljević (yellow card) 38'; R.Murtazayev (yellow card) 50'; Finonchenko (yellow card) 65'; Malyi (yellow card) 84'	Summary	Ovshinov (yellow card) 53' (red card) 90+2'; I.Amirseitov (yellow card) 79'; Y.Nurgaliyev (yellow card) 90+4'	Stadium: Shakhter Stadium; Attendance: 3,000; Referee: Askhat Abdanbayev

1 June 2014 15	Spartak Semey	0 – 1	Taraz	Semey
17:00 (UTC+6)	Čović (yellow card) 25'; S.Sagindikov (yellow card) 55'; A.Yersalimov (yellow card) 73'	Summary	Tleshev 57'; B.Baytana (yellow card) 59'; D.Ubbink (yellow card) 82'	Stadium: Spartak Stadium; Attendance: 3,000; Referee: Aydin Rakhimbayev

14 June 2014 16	Spartak Semey	2 – 1	Atyrau	Semey
18:00 (UTC+6)	Peev (yellow card) 37'; A.Yersalimov 49'; Azovskiy 63'; I.Amirseitov (yellow card) 75'; Genev (yellow card) 85'	Summary	Trifunović 8' (pen.); Plaskonny (yellow card) 62'; Savio (yellow card) 83'; Butuyev (yellow card) 86'	Stadium: Spartak Stadium; Attendance: 4,000; Referee: Denis Izmailov

22 June 2014 17	Zhetysu	1 – 0	Spartak Semey	Taldykorgan
18:30 (UTC+6)	S.Schaff 16' (yellow card) 90+4'; K.Zotov (yellow card) 45+1'	Summary	Kutsov (yellow card) 44'	Stadium: Zhetysu Stadium; Attendance: 1,500; Referee: Timur Kumashev

28 June 2014 18	Spartak Semey	2 – 0	Ordabasy	Semey
18:30 (UTC+6)	Rudzik 8'; V.Akhmeyev 13'; Azovskiy (yellow card) 15'; A.Avagyan (yellow card) 17'; Ovshinov (yellow card) 53'	Summary	Mwesigwa (yellow card) 5'; G.Suyumbaev (yellow card) 88'	Stadium: Spartak Stadium; Attendance: 3,000; Referee: Askhat Abdanbayev

5 July 2014 19	Kaisar	1 – 1	Spartak Semey	Kyzylorda
19:00 (UTC+6)	Strukov 26'; Zemlianukhin (yellow card) 60'	Summary	V.Akhmeyev (yellow card) 8'; Peev 64'; Jovanović (yellow card) 90+5'	Stadium: Gany Muratbayev Stadium; Attendance: 3,000; Referee: Aleksandr Gauzer

12 July 2014 20	Spartak Semey	1 – 1	Astana	Semey
(UTC+6)	Peev 42'; A.Sakenov (yellow card) 70'	Summary	Postnikov (yellow card) 60'; Kéthévoama (yellow card) 77'; Obradović 82' (o.g.)	Stadium: Spartak Stadium; Attendance: 4,000; Referee: Bolat Karlibayev

27 July 2014 21	Kairat	4 – 1	Spartak Semey	Almaty
20:00 (UTC+6)	Kutsov 6' (o.g.); Isael (yellow card) 39'; Gohou 56', 84'; Kislitsyn 86'	Summary	Jovanović 17'; Genev (yellow card) 19'; A.Yersalimov (yellow card) 77'	Stadium: Central Stadium; Attendance: 7,300; Referee: Viktor Antonov

3 August 2014 22	Spartak Semey	2 – 1	Tobol	Semey
18:00 (UTC+6)	Jovanović 71' (pen.); S.Sagindikov (yellow card) 78'; Dyulgerov (yellow card) 83'; Genev 87'	Summary	Jeslínek 43'; Zhumaskaliyev (yellow card) 70'; A.Satubaldin (yellow card) 72'; Volkov (yellow card) 78'; Irismetov (yellow card) 82'; Kušnír (yellow card) 90+1'	Stadium: Spartak Stadium; Attendance: 4,000; Referee: Denis Izmailov

===== League table =====
Pos	Team	Pld	W	D	L	GF	GA	GD	Pts	Qualification
8	Tobol	22	6	8	8	22	29	−7	26	Qualification for the relegation round
9	Irtysh Pavlodar	22	6	6	10	28	35	−7	24 (Note: ATY 0–1 IRT; IRT 0-1 ATY)	Qualification for the relegation round
10	Atyrau	22	6	6	10	19	27	−8	24	Qualification for the relegation round
11	Taraz	22	5	4	13	21	34	−13	19	Qualification for the relegation round
12	Spartak Semey	22	3	5	14	16	41	−25	14	Qualification for the relegation round

Source: Soccerway (in Russian)
Rules for classification: 1st points;
Two team tiebreak: 1st overall wins; 2nd head-to-head record; 3rd goals difference; 4th goals scored; 5th away goals scored;
Multiple teams tiebreak: 1st overall wins; 2nd goals difference; 3rd goals scored; 4th away goals scored

==== Relegation round ====
===== Results summary =====
Overall								Home						Away					
Pld	W	D	L	GF	GA	GD	Pts	W	D	L	GF	GA	GD	W	D	L	GF	GA	GD
10	4	2	4	14	11	+3	14	4	1	0	10	3	+7	0	1	4	4	8	−4

Last updated: 27 March 2015.
Source: Soccerway

===== Results =====
23 August 2014 1	Spartak Semey	0 – 0	Taraz	Semey
17:00 (UTC+6)	Genev (yellow card) 58'; Rudzik (red card) 90+2'	Summary	O.Nedashkovsky (yellow card) 41'; D.Evstigneev (yellow card) 59'; Golić (yellow card) 75'; D.Bashlay (yellow card) 79'	Stadium: Spartak Stadium; Attendance: 1,500; Referee: Artyom Kuchin

29 August 2014 2	Spartak Semey	2 – 1	Tobol	Semey
17:30 (UTC+6)	Azovskiy 16'; Y.Nurgaliyev (yellow card) 38'; A.Avagyan (yellow card) 49'; Peev 53' (pen.)	Summary	Sadownichy (yellow card) 10' (yellow-red card) 77'; O.Krasić (yellow card) 19' (yellow-red card) 61'; Irismetov (yellow card) 26'; Kučera (yellow card) 33'; Bogdanov 50'	Stadium: Spartak Stadium; Attendance: 3,000; Referee: Denis Tevyashov

14 September 2014 3	Irtysh	3 – 2	Spartak Semey	Pavlodar
15:00 (UTC+6)	A.Totay 25'; Mukhutdinov (yellow card) 36'; Amanow 51'; Dudchenko 65' (pen.)	Summary	A.Ersalimov (yellow card) 23'; Y.Nurgaliyev 26', 42'	Stadium: Central Stadium; Attendance: 1,500; Referee: Aydin Rakhimbayev

20 September 2014 4	Spartak Semey	3 – 1	Zhetysu	Semey
16:30 (UTC+6)	Azovskiy 6'; Peev 24'; Jovanović 63' (pen.)	Summary	Kadio (yellow card) 17'; T.Danilyuk (yellow card) 45+1' (yellow-red card) 62'; Ahmetović 90+3'	Stadium: Spartak Stadium; Attendance: 1,500; Referee: Igor Khisamutdinov

28 September 2014 5	Atyrau	1 – 1	Spartak Semey	Atyrau
17:00 (UTC+6)	E.Kostrub (yellow card) 5'; Trifunović 28'; Karpovich (yellow card) 76'	Summary	Jovanović 27' (yellow card) 43'; Peev (yellow card) 56'	Stadium: Munaishy Stadium; Attendance: 2,000; Referee: Askhat Abdanbayev

4 October 2014 6	Tobol	1 – 0	Spartak Semey	Kostanay
16:00 (UTC+6)	Sadownichy 18' (yellow card) 52'; Šljivić (yellow card) 35'; Volkov (yellow card) 45'; Bogdanov (yellow card) 50'	Summary		Stadium: Central Stadium; Attendance: 3,000; Referee: Artyom Kuchin

19 October 2014 7	Spartak Semey	2 – 0	Irtysh	Semy
15:00 (UTC+6)	Jovanović 28'; E.Nurgaliyev 33' (yellow card) 81'; S.Sagindikov (yellow card) 68'	Summary	Mukhutdinov (yellow card) 86'	Stadium: Spartak Stadium; Attendance: 4,000; Referee: Aydin Rakhimbayev

26 October 2014 8	Zhetysu	2 – 1	Spartak Semey	Taldykorgan
14:00 (UTC+6)	S.Sariyev (yellow card) 6'; Shaikhov (yellow card) 24' (goal) 74'; T.Danilyuk 58'; Ergashev (yellow card) 67'	Summary	S.Sagindikov (yellow card) 24'; Y.Nurgaliyev (yellow card) 40'; Kutsov 90+1'	Stadium: Zhetysu Stadium; Attendance: 3,000; Referee: Igor Khisamutdinov

1 November 2014 9	Spartak Semey	3 – 1	Atyrau	Semey
15:00 (UTC+6)	B.Nurlibayev 5'; Rudzik (yellow card) 31'; Obradović (yellow card) 35'; Dyulgerov 84'; A.Sakenov 90+2'	Summary	A.Shakin (yellow card) 34'; Genev 64' (o.g.)	Stadium: Spartak Stadium; Attendance: 3,000; Referee: Aleksandr Gauzer

9 November 2014 10	Taraz	1 – 0	Spartak Semey	Taraz
15:00 (UTC+6)	D.Vasiljev (yellow card) 32'; Shchetkin 45+1' (pen.); Kuchma (yellow card) 63'; Z.Kozhamberdy (yellow card) 69'; D.Ubbink (yellow card) 90+3'	Summary	Jovanović (yellow card) 32'; Kutsov (yellow card) 61'; Y.Nurgaliyev (yellow card) 66'; Dyulgerov (yellow card) 90+1'	Stadium: Central Stadium; Attendance: 4,300; Referee: Akmalkhan Kholmatov

===== Table =====
Pos	Team	Pld	W	D	L	GF	GA	GD	Pts	Relegation
8	Zhetysu	32	10	8	14	21	31	−10	25	
9	Atyrau	32	10	7	15	30	43	−13	25	
10	Irtysh Pavlodar	32	9	10	13	39	44	−5	25	
11	Taraz (O)	32	9	7	16	32	45	−13	25	Qualification for the relegation play-off
12	Spartak Semey (R)	32	7	7	18	30	52	−22	21	Relegation to the Kazakhstan First Division

Source: Soccerway (in Russian)
Rules for classification: 1st points;
Two team tiebreak: 1st overall wins; 2nd head-to-head record; 3rd goals difference; 4th goals scored; 5th away goals scored;
Multiple teams tiebreak: 1st overall wins; 2nd goals difference; 3rd goals scored; 4th away goals scored.
Team start with half number of points from first round.
(O) Play-off winners; (R) Relegated

=== Kazakhstan Cup ===
23 April 2014 First round	Lashyn	2 – 0	Spartak Semey	Karatau
16:00 (UTC+6)	Yakovlev 29', 79' (pen.)	[ Summary]		Stadium: Ortaliq Stadium; Referee: Bolat Sariev

== Squad statistics ==
=== Goal scorers ===
Place	Position	Nation	Number	Name	Premier League	Kazakhstan Cup	Total
1	FW	Serbia	84	Nemanja Jovanović	7	0	7
2	MF	Kazakhstan	18	Maksim Azovskiy	4	0	4
2	MF	Bulgaria	77	Daniel Peev	4	0	4
4	MF	Serbia		Nemanja Čović	3	0	3
4	MF	Kazakhstan	8	Yerkebulan Nurgaliyev	3	0	0
6	FW	Serbia	23	Savo Kovačević	1	0	0
6	MF	Belarus	2	Filip Rudzik	1	0	0
6	DF	Bulgaria	52	Viktor Genev	1	0	0
6	MF	Kazakhstan	19	Azat Yersalimov	1	0	0
6	MF	Kazakhstan		Vladislav Akhmeev	1	0	0
6	DF	Kyrgyzstan	20	Sergey Kutsov	1	0	0
6	MF	Kazakhstan		Bagdat Nurlybaev	1	0	0
6	MF	Bulgaria	71	Nikolay Dyulgerov	1	0	0
6	MF	Kazakhstan	14	Alibek Sakenov	1	0	0
				TOTALS	30	0	30
