= Marko Jordan =

Croatian footballer

Personal information
- Full name: Marko El NinoJordan
- Date of birth: 27 October 1990 (age 36)
- Place of birth: Zadar, Croatia
- Height: 1.76 m (5 ft 9 in)
- Position: Forward

Youth career
- Zadar
- Šibenik

Senior career*
Years	Team	Apps	(Gls)
2009	Zagora Unešić		
2010–2011	Šibenik	3	(0)
2011	Omiš		
2011	RNK Split	1	(0)
2011–2012	Dugopolje		
2012–2013	Sesvete	12	(4)
2013	GOŠK Gabela	6	(1)
2014	Fastav Zlín	12	(3)
2014–2015	Istra 1961	17	(0)
2015–2017	Fastav Zlín	26	(5)
2017	Latina	4	(0)
2018	Alashkert	5	(0)
2019	Episkopi	20	(10)
2019	AO Poros		
2020	Rogaška	1	(0)
2020	Linköping City	13	(2)
2021	Međimurje	2	(0)
2021	TSV Blaubeuren		
2022-	Zadar		
- * Club domestic league appearances and goals as of 12:30, 31 January 2021 (UTC)

Marko Jordan (born 27 October 1990) is a Croatian football player, who currently plays for Zadar.

== Club career ==
Jordan made his professional debut in the Croatian First Football League for Šibenik on 8 May 2010 in a game against Dinamo Zagreb.

On 11 February 2018, Jordan signed for FC Alashkert. He then joined Episkopi in Greece which he played for until the summer 2019. On 2 November 2019, Jordan then joined AO Poros. He left the club again in mid-December 2019.

After a spell at NK Rogaška in Slovenia, Jordan moved to Swedish club FC Linköping City on 11 September 2020. He left the club at the end of the year.
