= Issiaka Bamba =

Ivorian footballer (born 1990)

Personal information
- Full name: Issiaka Bamba
- Date of birth: March 31, 1990 (age 36)
- Place of birth: Lakota, Ivory Coast
- Height: 1.80 m (5 ft 11 in)
- Position: Forward

Senior career*
Years	Team	Apps	(Gls)
2007–2008	Bingerville	0	(0)
2008–2009	OC Charleroi	9	(2)
2009–2013	Africa Sports	0	(0)
2013–2014	Wydad de Fès	0	(0)
2014–2015	AS Salé	0	(0)
2015–2017	Marítimo	22	(2)
2018	Gandzasar Kapan	7	(1)
2020–2021	Is-Selongey		
2023–2024	Raeren-Eynatten		
2024–	Couthuin Sports		
- * Club domestic league appearances and goals as of 23 May 2018 ‡ National team caps and goals as of 9 August 2015

Issiaka Bamba or Bamba for short (born 31 March 1990) is an Ivorian professional footballer who plays as a forward for Couthuin Sports in Belgium.

== Career ==
=== Club ===
In March 2018, Bamba signed for Armenian Premier League club Gandzasar Kapan until the end of the 2017–18 season.
