= Aleksandr Shcherbakov (footballer) =

Russian footballer

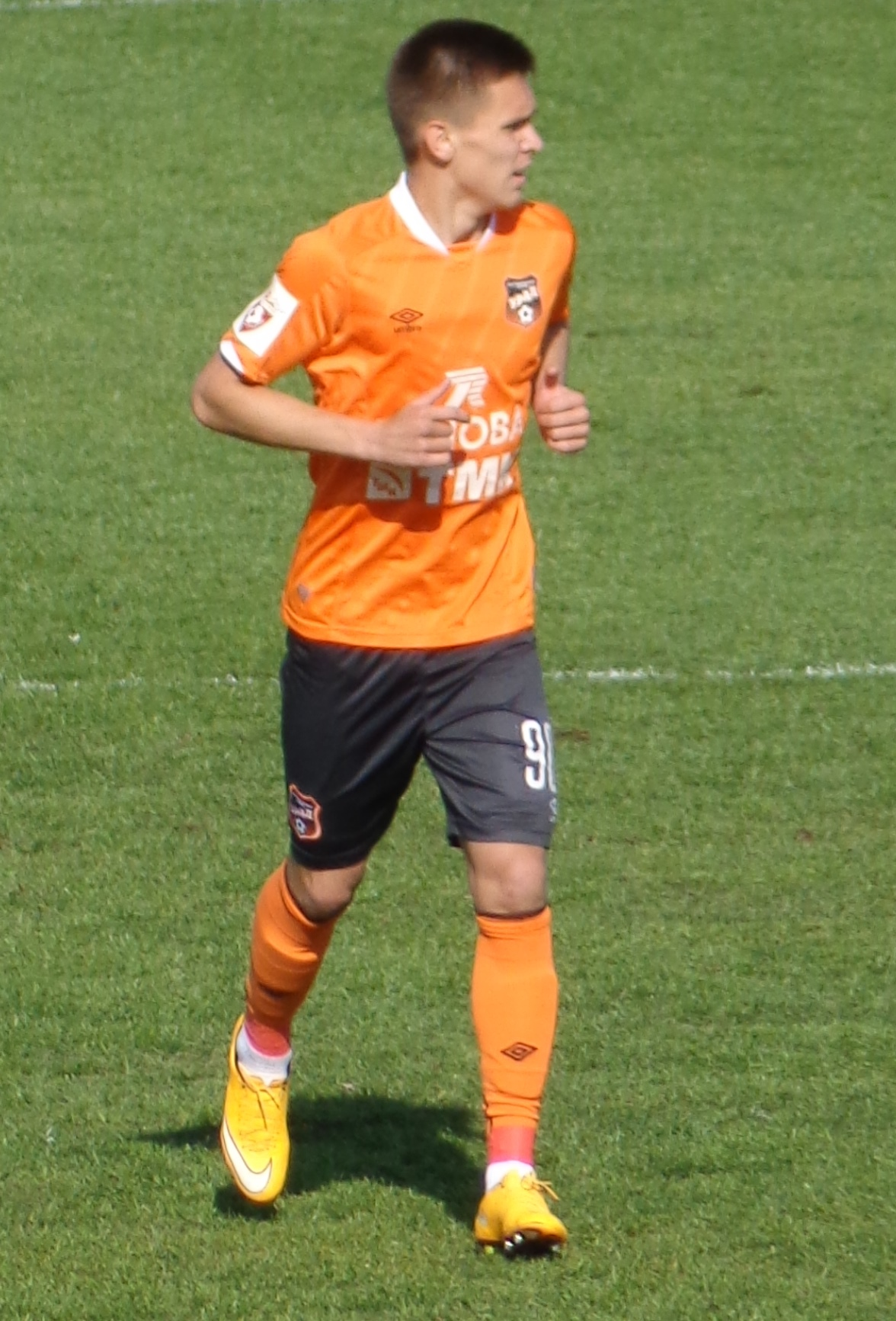

Personal information
- Full name: Aleksandr Sergeyevich Shcherbakov
- Date of birth: 26 June 1998 (age 28)
- Place of birth: Polevskoy, Russia
- Height: 1.75 m (5 ft 9 in)
- Position: Midfielder

Senior career*
Years	Team	Apps	(Gls)
2015–2022	Ural Yekaterinburg	6	(0)
2017	→ Ural-2 Yekaterinburg	10	(1)
2018	→ Alashkert (loan)	1	(0)
2018–2019	→ Enosis Neon Paralimni (loan)	11	(0)
2019–2022	→ Ural-2 Yekaterinburg	63	(6)
2023	Sokol Saratov	10	(0)
2023–2024	Dynamo Vladivostok	22	(1)
2024–2025	Volgar Astrakhan	21	(2)
2025	Ural-2 Yekaterinburg	10	(0)
2026	Izhevsk	8	(1)

International career
2014–2015	Russia U-17	3	(0)
- * Club domestic league appearances and goals as of 21 June 2026

Aleksandr Sergeyevich Shcherbakov (Russian: Александр Сергеевич Щербаков; born 26 June 1998) is a Russian professional football player who plays as a right winger.

== Club career ==
He made his professional debut on 19 March 2016 for Ural in a Russian Premier League game against Terek Grozny.

On 11 February 2018, he joined the Armenian club Alashkert on loan.
