= Goran Obradović (footballer, born 1986) =

Serbian footballer (1986–2021)

Personal information
- Date of birth: 25 December 1986
- Place of birth: Belgrade, SR Serbia, SFR Yugoslavia
- Date of death: 31 August 2021 (aged 34)
- Place of death: Belgrade, Serbia
- Height: 1.88 m (6 ft 2 in)
- Position: Defender

Senior career*
Years	Team	Apps	(Gls)
2009	Ararat Yerevan	15	(1)
2009–2011	Mladi Radnik	10	(1)
2011–2014	Gandzasar	83	(4)
2014	→ Spartak Semey (loan)	10	(0)
2015	Alashkert	4	(0)
2015	Mika	3	(0)
2016–2017	Lanexang United	22	(1)
2017	AC Tripoli		
2018	BSK Borča		
2018	Ararat Yerevan	12	(1)
2018–2019	Al-Minaa	10	(0)
2020	Chamchuri United		
2020–2021	Township Rollers		
- * Club domestic league appearances and goals

Goran Obradović (Serbian Cyrillic: Горан Обрадовић; 25 December 1986 – 31 August 2021) was a Serbian professional footballer who played as a defender.

== Career ==
On 3 November 2020, Botswana Premier League club Township Rollers announced the signing of Obradović.

== Death ==
Obradović committed suicide on 31 August 2021.
