= Arsen Petrosyan =

Armenian footballer (born 1991)

Personal information
- Date of birth: 27 September 1991 (age 35)
- Place of birth: Yerevan, Armenia
- Height: 1.82 m (6 ft 0 in)
- Position: Goalkeeper

Senior career*
Years	Team	Apps	(Gls)
2007	Patani	19	(0)
2009	Gandzasar Kapan	1	(0)
2010–2012	Pyunik	14	(0)
2012–2014	Ararat Yerevan	13	(0)
2014–2015	Gandzasar Kapan-2	4	(0)
2015–2016	Gandzasar Kapan	25	(0)
2017	Ganshoren		
2017	Ararat Yerevan	5	(0)
2018–2019	Alashkert	0	(0)

International career
2011	Armenia U21	3	(0)
2011–2019	Armenia	1	(0)
- * Club domestic league appearances and goals

Arsen Petrosyan (Armenian: Արսեն Պետրոսյան, born on 27 September 1991) is an Armenian former professional footballer who played as a goalkeeper. He made one appearance for the Armenia national team.

== Club career ==
Petrosyan was born in Yerevan, Armenia. Early in his career, he played in the Armenian First League with a team of young men 17 years of age. In 2009, Petrosyan went to Gandzasar Kapan. Apart from him at the club was his older brother, Alexander Petrosyan, and head coach who was their father, Samvel Petrosyan. That season Arsen was able to play only one game. After the departure of his father from the coaching staff, he left the club after the end of the season.

=== Pyunik ===
The next club in Petrosyan's career became the reigning Armenian Premier League champion Pyunik Yerevan. Because of the high competition in the club, Petrosyan could not play starting goalkeeper. His competition was Karen Israelyan. In late 2010, the core team made drastic changes. The two main goalkeepers, Artur Lesko and Edward Hovhannisyan, left the team. Thus, to fill the vacancy for this role, the coaching staff had to decide between Petrosyan and Israelyan. In addition, in early 2011, the club acquired Serbian goalkeeper Đorđe Pantić. However, after three games, because of a large percentage of transfers between the matches, the management promptly terminated the contract with the Serbian goalkeeper. For the entire 2011 season, Petrosyan and Israelyan alternately played in the league and cup competitions. In a list of the most reliable goalkeeper of the 2011 season, Petrosyan took 5th. In early January 2012, Karen Israelyan was leaving the club. Petrosyan took the place at the heart of the team. Not having competition, Petrosyan began to make periodic errors in the matches, leading to missed goals. The credibility of the Petrosyan fell slightly, and he was periodically substituted with second goalkeeper Albert Ohanyan.

=== Ararat ===
In the summer transfer window, Petrosyan signed a contract with Ararat Yerevan. The club changed the orientation of the local players, leaving some without any playing time. Along with Petrosyan, to the club came Hayk Mkrtchyan and Gevorg Nranyan.

=== Ararat Yerevan ===
On 8 July 2017, Petrosyan signed for Ararat Yerevan.

== International career ==
In the Armenia U21 youth team, Petrosyan played three matches. Petrosyan debuted in the core Armenia national football team on 11 October 2011 in a scandalous game against Ireland when first goalkeeper Roman Berezovsky was controversially shown a red card. He was penalized for handball in the first few minutes, though replays clearly showed his hands never touched the ball. In that game, Arsen missed two goals, one of which was accidentally scored by teammate Valeri Aleksanyan. Armenia lost 2–1 and missed their chance to qualify for the UEFA Euro 2012.

== Personal life ==
His father Samvel Petrosyan is a former player of Ararat Yerevan and now a football coach. Arsen has an older brother, Alexander, who is also a professional football player.

== Honours ==
Pyunik Yerevan

- Armenian Supercup: 2011
