= Alan Pires =

Brazilian footballer (born 1993)

Personal information
- Full name: Alan Pires da Graça
- Date of birth: 4 January 1993 (age 33)
- Place of birth: Rio de Janeiro, Brazil
- Height: 1.77 m (5 ft 10 in)
- Position: Left back

Team information
- Current team: Duque de Caxias

Youth career
- 2010: America
- 2011: Boavista
- 2012: São José

Senior career*
Years	Team	Apps	(Gls)
2012–2013	Vila Nova	31	(1)
2014	Duque de Caxias	11	(0)
2014	Madureira	3	(0)
2014–2015	Sintrense	2	(0)
2015	CRAC	3	(0)
2015	Cabofriense	3	(0)
2016	Glória	0	(0)
2016–2018	Tubize	24	(1)
2018	Alashkert	0	(0)
2018	→ Ararat Yerevan (loan)	7	(0)
2019	America	3	(0)
2019	Duque de Caxias	17	(0)
2020	Nacional de Patos	4	(0)
2020	Ferroviário	2	(0)
2020	Portuguesa-RJ	13	(0)
2021	America	9	(0)
2021	Salgueiro	15	(0)
2021–	Duque de Caxias	2	(0)
- * Club domestic league appearances and goals as of 19:26, 4 May 2019 (UTC)

Alan Pires da Graça (born 4 January 1993), commonly known as Alan Pires, is a Brazilian footballer who plays as a left back for Duque de Caxias.

== Career ==
=== Club ===
On 14 February 2018, Alan Pires signed an 18-month contract with Armenian Premier League club FC Alashkert. On 1 March, Alashkert announced that Alan Pires had moved to fellow Armenian Premier League club Ararat Yerevan on loan for the remainder of the season.

== Career statistics ==
=== Club ===
As of 4 May 2019.

Club	Season	League			State League		Cup		Continental		Other		Total	
Club	Season	Division	Apps	Goals	Apps	Goals	Apps	Goals	Apps	Goals	Apps	Goals	Apps	Goals
Vila Nova	2012	Série C	1	0	4 (Note: Appearances in the Campeonato Goiano)	0	0	0	–		0	0	5	0
Vila Nova	2013	Série C	16	0	10	1	0	0	–		0	0	26	1
Vila Nova	Total		17	0	14	1	0	0	0	0	0	0	31	1
Duque de Caxias	2014	Série C	0	0	10 (Note: Appearances in the Campeonato Carioca)	0	1 (Note: Appearances in the Copa do Brasil)	0	–		0	0	11	0
Madureira Esporte Clube	2014	Série C	2	0	0	0	0	0	–		0	0	2	0
Sintrense	2014–15	Campeonato Nacional de Seniores	2	0	–		0	0	–		0	0	2	0
CRAC	2015	Série D	0	0	3	0	0	0	–		0	0	3	0
Glória	2016	–			0	0	0	0	–		0	0	0	0
Tubize	2016–17	Belgian First Division B	22	1	–		3 (Note: Appearances in the Belgian Cup)	0	–		0	0	25	1
Tubize	2017–18	Belgian First Division B	2	0	–		1	0	–		0	0	3	0
Tubize	Total		24	1	0	0	4	0	0	0	0	0	28	1
Alashkert	2017–18	Armenian Premier League	0	0	–		0	0	–		0	0	0	0
Ararat Yerevan (loan)	2017–18	Armenian Premier League	7	0	–		0	0	–		0	0	7	0
America	2019	–			3	0	0	0	–		0	0	3	0
Career total			52	1	30	0	5	0	0	0	0	0	87	1
