= Sergei Serchenkov (footballer, born 1997) =

Russian footballer

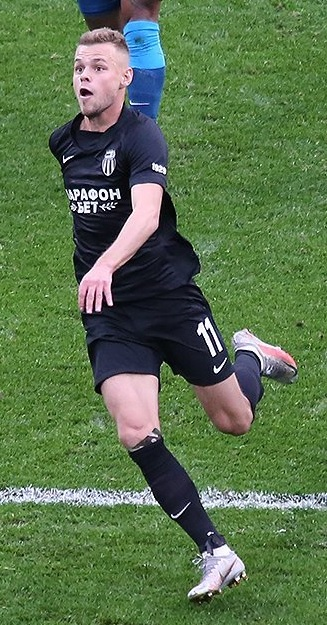
- Serchenkov with Rotor Volgograd in 2021

Personal information
- Full name: Sergei Sergeyevich Serchenkov
- Date of birth: 1 January 1997 (age 29)
- Place of birth: Krasnodar, Russia
- Height: 1.79 m (5 ft 10 in)
- Position: Midfielder

Youth career
- Lokomotiv Moscow

Senior career*
| Years | Team | Apps | (Gls) |
| 2014–2019 | Ural Yekaterinburg | 12 | (1) |
| 2017 | → Orenburg (loan) | 12 | (1) |
| 2018 | → Alashkert (loan) | 5 | (0) |
| 2018–2019 | → Ural-2 Yekaterinburg | 32 | (11) |
| 2020–2022 | Rotor Volgograd | 46 | (2) |
| 2021–2022 | Rotor-2 Volgograd | 2 | (0) |
| 2022–2023 | KAMAZ | 28 | (1) |
| 2023 | Dynamo Stavropol | 16 | (2) |
| 2024–2025 | Torpedo Miass | 31 | (3) |
| 2025 | Uralets-TS Nizhny Tagil | 3 | (0) |

International career
| 2012 | Russia U-15 | 9 | (3) |
| 2013 | Russia U-16 | 2 | (0) |
| 2014 | Russia U-17 | 4 | (1) |
| 2015 | Russia U-18 | 6 | (1) |
| 2015 | Russia U-19 | 3 | (0) |
- * Club domestic league appearances and goals as of 19 October 2025

Sergei Sergeyevich Serchenkov (Russian: Сергей Сергеевич Серченков; born 1 January 1997) is a Russian football midfielder.

== Club career ==
He made his Russian Premier League debut on 7 March 2015 for Ural Yekaterinburg in a game against Zenit Saint Petersburg.

On 11 February 2018, he joined the Armenian club Alashkert on loan.
