= 2019–20 Shirak SC season =

Shirak
2019-20 season
- Chairman: Arman Sahakyan
- Manager: Vardan Bichakhchyan
- Stadium: Gyumri City Stadium
- Premier League: 4th
- Armenian Cup: Second Round vs Gandzasar Kapan
- Top goalscorer: League: Mory Kone (23); All: Mory Kone (23)

The 2019–20 season was Shirak's 29th consecutive season in the Armenian Premier League.

== Season events ==
On 12 March 2020, the Football Federation of Armenia announced that all Armenian Premier League games had been postponed until 23 March due to the COVID-19 pandemic.

== Squad ==
As of match played 14 July 2020

No.	Name	Nationality	Position	Date of birth (age)	Signed from	Signed in	Contract ends	Apps.	Goals
Goalkeepers
1	Sokrat Hovhannisyan	(Armenia)	GK	5 April 1996 (aged 24)	Academy	2017		1	0
45	Vsevolod Yermakov	(Russia)	GK	6 January 1996 (aged 24)	Zenit-Izhevsk	2018		72	0
Defenders
2	Vardan Shakhbazyan	(Armenia)	DF	29 July 1999 (aged 20)	Academy	2019		0	0
3	Artur Amiryan	(Armenia)	DF	6 July 1997 (aged 23)	Academy	2017		7	0
4	Artyom Mikaelyan	(Armenia)	DF	12 July 1991 (aged 29)	Academy	2010		143	3
5	Hakob Vardanyan	(Armenia)	DF	1 July 1999 (aged 21)	Academy	2019		0	0
6	Marko Prljević	(Serbia)	DF	2 August 1988 (aged 31)	Tsarsko Selo Sofia	2019		79	2
8	Zhirayr Margaryan	(Armenia)	DF	13 September 1997 (aged 22)	Banants	2018		74	3
22	Hrayr Mkoyan	(Armenia)	DF	2 September 1986 (aged 33)	Alashkert	2019		103+	3+
23	Bogdan Miličić	(Serbia)	DF	6 January 1989 (aged 31)	Zlatibor Čajetina	2019		27	0
25	Aghvan Davoyan	(Armenia)	DF	21 March 1990 (aged 30)	Academy	2010		219	1
95	Vardan Arzoyan	(Armenia)	DF	30 April 1995 (aged 25)	Gandzasar Kapan	2020		2	0
Midfielders
7	Arman Aslanyan	(Armenia)	MF	30 January 1994 (aged 26)	Academy	2013		64	1
10	Edgar Malakyan	(Armenia)	MF	22 September 1990 (aged 29)	Petrolul Ploiești	2019		50	2
11	Solomon Udo	(Nigeria)	MF	15 July 1995 (aged 24)	Urartu	2019		105	9
18	Rafik Misakyan	(Armenia)	MF	2 January 2000 (aged 20)	Banants	2018		32	0
19	Karen Muradyan	(Armenia)	MF	1 November 1992 (aged 27)		2018	2020	164	3
20	Rudik Mkrtchyan	(Armenia)	MF	26 October 1998 (aged 21)	Academy	2017		63	2
43	Artush Mirzakhanyan	(Armenia)	MF	30 September 1998 (aged 21)	Academy	2014		1	0
77	David Manoyan	(Armenia)	MF	5 July 1990 (aged 30)	Noah	2020		13	0
99	Junior Avo Leibe	(Ivory Coast)	MF	20 December 1997 (aged 22)	SC Gagnoa	2020	2020	11	0
Forwards
9	Aram Muradyan	(Armenia)	FW	14 April 1995 (aged 25)	Academy	2013		143	15
17	Arlen Tsaturyan	(Armenia)	FW	5 January 1999 (aged 21)	Academy	2017		19	0
21	Artyom Gevorkyan	(Russia)	FW	21 May 1993 (aged 27)	Chayka Peschanokopskoye	2019		35	3
38	Albert Darbinyan	(Armenia)	FW	2 January 2002 (aged 18)	Academy	2018		2	0
39	Lyova Mryan	(Armenia)	FW	11 May 2000 (aged 20)	Academy	2018		5	0
70	Uroš Nenadović	(Serbia)	FW	28 January 1994 (aged 26)	AC Horsens	2020		10	2
98	Mory Kone	(Ivory Coast)	FW	13 July 1995 (aged 25)	BFC Daugavpils	2019		29	23
Players out on loan
44	Levon Darbinyan	(Armenia)	MF	24 January 2002 (aged 18)	Youth team	2018		1	0
Players who left during the season
88	Moussa Bakayoko	(Ivory Coast)	MF	27 December 1996 (aged 23)	Raja Casablanca	2017		82	20

=== Out on loan ===
Note: Flags indicate national team as defined under FIFA eligibility rules; some limited exceptions apply. Players may hold more than one non-FIFA nationality.

No. / Pos. / Nation / Player; 44 / MF / ARM / Levon Darbinyan (at BKMA Yerevan)	No. / Pos. / Nation / Player

== Transfers ==
=== In ===
Date	Position	Nationality	Name	From	Fee	Ref.
Summer 2019	DF	(Armenia)	Hrayr Mkoyan	Alashkert	Undisclosed	
Summer 2019	DF	(Serbia)	Bogdan Miličić	Zlatibor Čajetina	Undisclosed	
Summer 2019	MF	(Armenia)	Edgar Malakyan	Petrolul Ploiești	Undisclosed	
Summer 2019	MF	(Nigeria)	Solomon Udo	Urartu	Undisclosed	
Summer 2019	FW	(Ivory Coast)	Mory Kone	BFC Daugavpils	Undisclosed	
7 January 2020	DF	(Armenia)	Vardan Arzoyan	Gandzasar Kapan	Free	
16 January 2020	MF	(Armenia)	David Manoyan	Noah	Free	
23 January 2020	FW	(Serbia)	Uroš Nenadović	AC Horsens	Free	
2 March 2020	DF	(Ivory Coast)	Junior Avo Leibe	SC Gagnoa	Undisclosed	

=== Loans out ===
Start date	Position	Nationality	Name	To	End date	Ref.
1 January 2020	MF	(Armenia)	Levon Darbinyan	BKMA Yerevan	31 December 2020	

=== Released ===
Date	Position	Nationality	Name	Joined	Date
7 January 2020	MF	(Ivory Coast)	Moussa Bakayoko	Derry City	31 January 2020

== Friendlies ==
18 January 2020	Pyunik	0 – 2	Shirak
(UTC+4)	A.Aslanyan; L.Mryan	Report

25 January 2020	Shirak	3 – 1	Lokomotiv Yerevan
(UTC+4)	L.Mryan; A.Gevorkyan	Report	Goal

1 February 2020	Shirak	2 – 1	Gandzasar Kapan
(UTC+4)	A.Gevorkyan; A.Junior	Report	G.Harutyunyan

8 February 2020	Shirak (Armenia)	2 – 1	(Kazakhstan) Caspiy	Antalya, Turkey
(UTC+4)	Nenadović; Malakyan	Report	Goal

12 February 2020	Shirak (Armenia)	2 – 1	(Russia) SKA-Khabarovsk	Antalya, Turkey
18:00 (UTC+4)	Nenadović; V.Arzoyan	Report	Goal

15 February 2020	Shirak (Armenia)	1 – 1	(Uzbekistan) Qizilqum Zarafshon	Antalya, Turkey
(UTC+4)	Malakyan	Report	Goal

19 February 2020	Shirak (Armenia)	3 – 3	(Denmark) Vanløse	Antalya, Turkey
(UTC+4)	L.Mryan; V.Arzoyan; R.Mkrtchyan	Report	Goal

19 February 2020	Shirak (Armenia)	1 – 1	(Russia) Nizhny Novgorod	Antalya, Turkey
(UTC+4)	M.Kone	Report	Goal

9 May 2020	Shirak	3 – 0	Torpedo Yerevan	Gyumri
13:00 (UTC+4)	Udo; M.Kone; R.Mkrtchyan	Report		Stadium: Gyumri City Stadium; Attendance: 0

16 May 2020	Shirak	2 – 1	Van	Gyumri
13:00 (UTC+4)	Mkoyan; M.Kone	Report	Goal	Stadium: Gyumri City Stadium; Attendance: 0

== Competitions ==
=== Premier League ===
==== Regular season ====
===== Results summary =====
Overall								Home						Away					
Pld	W	D	L	GF	GA	GD	Pts	W	D	L	GF	GA	GD	W	D	L	GF	GA	GD
18	8	4	6	25	18	+7	28	6	2	2	16	9	+7	2	2	4	9	9	0

Last updated: 23 May 2020.
Source: See Results

===== Results =====
2 August 2019 1	Shirak	3 – 1	Urartu	Gyumri
17:00 (UTC+4)	Gevorkyan 19'; M.Kone 40', 58'; A.Aslanyan (yellow card) 53'	Report	Kobzar 71'; Dashyan (red card) 88'	Stadium: Gyumri City Stadium; Attendance: 700; Referee: Artur Safaryan

9 August 2019 2	Ararat Yerevan	2 – 1	Shirak	Yerevan
19:30 (UTC+4)	Dedechko 57' (yellow card) 79'; P.Ayvazyan (yellow card) 67'; Kozlov 88'	Report	Gevorkyan (yellow card) 42'; Bakayoko 55'; Mkoyan (red card) 67'	Stadium: Vazgen Sargsyan Republican Stadium; Attendance: 700; Referee: Ashot Ghaltakchyan

16 August 2019 3	Shirak	2 – 1	Yerevan	Gyumri
17:00 (UTC+4)	D.Lyubimov 29' (o.g.); Bakayoko 41'; Gevorkyan (yellow card) 45'; K.Muradyan (yellow card) 90+2'; Yermakov (yellow card) 90+5'	Report	Ar.Petrosyan (yellow card) 38'; S.Hrabchak 39'; Cruz (yellow card) 61'	Stadium: Gyumri City Stadium; Attendance: 500; Referee: Gevorg Eghoyan

25 August 2019 4	Shirak	3 – 1	Pyunik	Gyumri
17:00 (UTC+4)	A.Aslanyan (yellow card) 6'; M.Kone 37', 63', 80'	Report	Stankov (yellow card) 68'; A.Manucharyan (yellow card) 90+1' (yellow-red card) 90+2'; Miranyan 90+3'	Stadium: Gyumri City Stadium; Attendance: 800; Referee: Zaven Hovhannisyan

31 August 2019 5	Alashkert	1 – 2	Shirak	Yerevan
17:00 (UTC+4)	M.Manasyan 36'; V.Pogosyan (yellow card) 66'; Baranov (yellow card) 82'	Report	Prljević (yellow card) 42'; Bakayoko 50' (pen.); M.Kone (yellow card) 86' (goal) 90+1'	Stadium: Alashkert Stadium; Attendance: 250; Referee: Suren Baliyan

14 September 2019 6	Shirak	0 – 0	Gandzasar Kapan	Gyumri
16:00 (UTC+4)	Bakayoko (yellow card) 45+1'	Report	S.Adjuman (yellow card) 20'; G.Ohanyan (yellow card) 68'	Stadium: Gyumri City Stadium; Attendance: 500; Referee: Edgar Sahakyan

18 September 2019 7	Noah	0 – 0	Shirak	Yerevan
16:15 (UTC+4)	Deobald (yellow card) 54'; V.Vimercati (yellow card) 81'	Report	M.Kone (yellow card) 43'; Z.Margaryan (yellow card) 51'; A.Muradyan (yellow card) 55'; Bakayoko (yellow card) 81'	Stadium: Alashkert Stadium; Attendance: 200; Referee: Henrik Nalbandyan
Note: Match played at the Alashkert Stadium in Yerevan, instead of Gandzasar Kapan regular Gandzasar Stadium in Kapan.

21 September 2019 8	Shirak	1 – 0	Ararat-Armenia	Gyumri
16:00 (UTC+4)	M.Kone 29'; Bakayoko (yellow card) 44'; Udo (yellow card) 90+1'	Report	Pashov (yellow card) 85'	Stadium: Gyumri City Stadium; Attendance: 1,000; Referee: Suren Baliyan

30 September 2019 9	Lori	0 – 0	Shirak	Vanadzor
16:00 (UTC+4)	J.Bravo (yellow card) 57'; A.Avagyan (yellow card) 89'; R.Minasyan (yellow card) 90+1'	Report	A.Davoyan (yellow card) 50'	Stadium: Vanadzor Football Academy; Attendance: 450; Referee: Artur afaryan

5 October 2019 10	Urartu	2 – 2	Shirak	Yerevan
19:00 (UTC+4)	Kobzar 28'; Darbinyan (yellow card) 36'; Kpodo (yellow card) 52'; Nikolić (yellow card) 55'; J.Grgec (yellow card) 78'; K.Melkonyan 88'; Camara (yellow card) 90+2'	Report	M.Kone 58', 82'	Stadium: Urartu Stadium; Attendance: 400

19 October 2019 11	Shirak	2 – 1	Ararat Yerevan	Gyumri
15:00 (UTC+4)	M.Kone 23'; R.Misakyan (yellow card) 28'; Prljević (yellow card) 59' (yellow-red card) 69'; A.Muradyan 88'; Mikaelyan (yellow card) 90+3'	Report	Morozov (yellow card) 14'; Aleksanyan (yellow card) 30'; Spychka (yellow card) 35'; Welsen Junior 55'; Kozlov (yellow card) 84'; Revyakin (yellow card) 90+1'; G.Chelidze (yellow card) 90+3'	Stadium: Gyumri City Stadium; Attendance: 500; Referee: Gevorg Eghoyan

25 October 2019 12	Yerevan	1 – 4	Shirak	Vanadzor
15:00 (UTC+4)	A.Portugalyan 73'; A.Mir Doraghi (yellow card) 90+2'	Report	A.Aslanyan 13'; R.Misakyan 18'; M.Kone 26'; Z.Margaryan (yellow card) 45'; A.Gevorkyan 60'; A.Tsaturyan (yellow card) 78'; K.Muradyan (yellow card) 90+2'	Stadium: Vanadzor City Stadium; Attendance: 100; Referee: Artur Simonyan
Note: Match played at the Vanadzor City Stadium in Vanadzor, instead of Yerevan's regular Vazgen Sargsyan Republican Stadium in Yerevan.

8 November 2019 13	Pyunik	1 – 0	Shirak	Yerevan
18:30 (UTC+4)	Mahmudov 14'; Zhestokov (yellow card) 17'; R.Hakobyan (yellow card) 27' (yellow-red card) 51'	Report	Prljević (yellow card) 8'; Miličić (yellow card) 62'; Gevorkyan (yellow card) 73'	Stadium: Vazgen Sargsyan Republican Stadium; Attendance: 250; Referee: Zaven Hovhannisyan

23 November 2019 14	Shirak	1 – 3	Alashkert	Gyumri
14:00 (UTC+4)	Voskanyan 82' (o.g.)	Report	Marmentini 13', 36' (pen.); Thiago Galvão 85'	Stadium: Gyumri City Stadium; Attendance: 500; Referee: Ashot Ghaltakchyan

2 December 2019 15	Gandzasar Kapan	1 – 0	Shirak	Yerevan
14:45 (UTC+4)	A.Aslanyan (yellow card) 6'; A.Zoko (yellow card) 11'; G.Nranyan (yellow card) 19'; A.Kocharyan (yellow card) 69'; Pogosyan (yellow card) 85'	Report	R.Misakyan (yellow card) 70'; A.Aslanyan (yellow card) 90+6'	Stadium: Yerevan Football Academy; Attendance: 100; Referee: Ashot Ghaltakchyan
Note: Match played at the Yerevan Football Academy in Yerevan, instead of Gandzasar Kapan regular Gandzasar Stadium in Kapan.

29 February 2020 16	Shirak	3 – 0	Noah	Gyumri
14:00 (UTC+4)	K.Muradyan (yellow card) 30'; M.Kone 43', 89'; Nenadović 75' (yellow card) 76'	Report	B.Hovhannisyan (yellow card) 21'	Stadium: Gyumri City Stadium; Attendance: 300; Referee: Gevorg Eghoyan

7 March 2020 17	Ararat-Armenia	1 – 0	Shirak	Yerevan
15:00 (UTC+4)	Vakulenko (yellow card) 28'; Ambartsumyan (yellow card) 38'; Danielyan (yellow card) 43'; Narsingh 71'	Report	Mkoyan (yellow card) 63'; M.Kone (yellow card) 79'; A.Gevorkyan (yellow card) 88'	Stadium: Yerevan Football Academy Stadium; Attendance: 500; Referee: Ashot Ghaltakchyan

23 May 2020 18	Shirak	1 – 2	Lori	Gyumri
16:30 (UTC+4)	M.Kone 72'; Miličić (yellow card) 90+1'	Report	Maziero 40' (yellow card) 86'; A.Mkrtchyan 69'; S.Shahinyan (yellow card) 86'	Stadium: Gyumri City Stadium; Attendance: 0 Referee: Zaven Hovhannisyan
Note: Match played behind closed doors. Match was originally scheduled for 14 March, but postponed on 13 March due to the COVID-19 pandemic.

===== Table =====
Pos	Team	Pld	W	D	L	GF	GA	GD	Pts	Qualification
1	Ararat-Armenia	18	11	3	4	33	15	+18	36	Qualification for the Championship round
2	Lori	18	9	5	4	27	19	+8	32	Qualification for the Championship round
3	Alashkert	18	9	4	5	33	20	+13	31	Qualification for the Championship round
4	Ararat	18	9	4	5	25	18	+7	31	Qualification for the Championship round
5	Noah	18	9	3	6	25	19	+6	30	Qualification for the Championship round
6	Shirak	18	8	4	6	25	18	+7	28	Qualification for the Championship round
7	Pyunik	18	7	2	9	35	36	−1	23	Qualification for the Relegation round
8	Urartu	18	6	5	7	22	24	−2	23	Qualification for the Relegation round
9	Gandzasar	18	4	6	8	20	25	−5	18	Qualification for the Relegation round
10	Yerevan (R, D)	18	0	0	18	11	62	−51	0	Withdrawn

Source: Soccerway
Rules for classification: 1) Points; 2) Play-off (only if deciding champion); 3) Matches won; 4) Head-to-head points; 5) Head-to-head matches won; 6) Head-to-head goal difference; 7) Head-to-head goals scored; 8) Head-to-head away goals scored; 9) Goal difference; 10) Goals scored.
(D) Disqualified; (R) Relegated

==== Championship round ====
===== Results summary =====
Overall								Home						Away					
Pld	W	D	L	GF	GA	GD	Pts	W	D	L	GF	GA	GD	W	D	L	GF	GA	GD
10	5	3	2	15	12	+3	18	3	1	1	7	4	+3	2	2	1	8	8	0

Last updated: 14 July 2020.
Source: See Results

===== Results =====
30 May 2020 19	Ararat-Armenia	1 – 1	Shirak	Yerevan
19:15 (UTC+4)	Malakyan (yellow card) 8'; Vakulenko 37'; Mailson (yellow card) 65'; Danielyan (yellow card) 75'	Report	R.Mkrtchyan 8'; Miličić (yellow card) 32'	Stadium: Yerevan Football Academy Stadium; Attendance: 0 Referee: Henrik Nalbandyan
Note: Match played behind closed doors due to the COVID-19 pandemic.

3 June 2020 20	Shirak	2 – 0	Ararat Yerevan	Gyumri
18:30 (UTC+4)	Malakyan (yellow card) 36'; Udo 55'; M.Kone 82'	Report	Rafinha (yellow card) 41'; Spychka (yellow card) 63'; Khurtsidze (yellow card) 77'	Stadium: Gyumri City Stadium; Attendance: 0 Referee: Artur Safaryan
Note: Match played behind closed doors due to the COVID-19 pandemic.

8 June 2020 21	Lori	1 – 1	Shirak	Vanadzor
15:30 (UTC+4)	A.Avagyan (yellow card) 20'; J.Bravo (yellow card) 29'; S.Shahinyan 37'	Report	Manoyan (yellow card) 77'; Mkoyan (yellow card) 82'; M.Kone 88'	Stadium: Vanadzor Football Academy; Attendance: 0 Referee: Shahen Aghayan
Note: Match played behind closed doors due to the COVID-19 pandemic.

11 June 2020 22	Shirak	2 – 0	Noah	Gyumri
17:00 (UTC+4)	M.Kone 36'; K.Muradyan (yellow card) 59'; Udo 74'; V.Yermakov (yellow card) 90+1'	Report	Spătaru (yellow card) 43'; Kagermazov (yellow card) 49'	Stadium: Gyumri City Stadium; Attendance: 0 Referee: Henrik Nalbandyan
Note: Match played behind closed doors due to the COVID-19 pandemic.

16 June 2020 23	Alashkert	1 – 2	Shirak	Yerevan
17:30 (UTC+4)	Gome (yellow card) 27'; Baranov (yellow card) 54'; Marmentini 88'	Report	M.Kone 76'; Nenadović 90+3'; V.Arzoyan (yellow card) 90+3'	Stadium: Alashkert Stadium; Attendance: 0 Referee: Henrik Nalbandyan
Note: Match played behind closed doors due to the COVID-19 pandemic.

20 June 2020 24	Shirak	1 – 0	Ararat-Armenia	Gyumri
17:30 (UTC+4)	M.Kone 35'; Malakyan (yellow card) 72'	Report	Danielyan (yellow card) 40'; Kódjo (yellow card) 44'; Ambartsumyan (yellow card) 90+3'; Kobyalko (yellow card) 90+5'; Abakumov (yellow card) 90+7'	Stadium: Gyumri City Stadium; Attendance: 0 Referee: Henrik Nalbandyan
Note: Match played behind closed doors due to the COVID-19 pandemic.

27 June 2020 25	Ararat Yerevan	1 – 4	Shirak	Yerevan
19:00 (UTC+4)	Badoyan 24'; Rafinha (yellow card) 73'	Report	Z.Margaryan 26', 90+3'; A.Gevorkyan (yellow card) 38'; M.Kone 55', 84'; Malakyan (yellow card) 63'	Stadium: Yerevan Football Academy Stadium; Attendance: 0 Referee: Vardan Manukyan
Note: Match played behind closed doors due to the COVID-19 pandemic.

2 July 2020 26	Shirak	0 – 0	Lori	Gyumri
17:30 (UTC+4)	A.Aslanyan (yellow card) 71'; L.Mryan (yellow card) 90+3'	Report	A.Yeoule (yellow card) 86'	Stadium: Gyumri City Stadium; Attendance: 0 Referee: Shahen Aghayan
Note: Match played behind closed doors due to the COVID-19 pandemic.

6 July 2020 27	Noah	4 – 0	Shirak	Yerevan
18:00 (UTC+4)	Gareginyan (yellow card) 38'; Mayrovich 44', 75' (pen.); V.Vimercati (yellow card) 65'; Emsis (yellow card) 82'; Lavrishchev 86'; R.Krusnauskas 90'	Report	J.Avo (yellow card) 40'; Z.Margaryan (red card) 74'; Manoyan (yellow card) 74'; Mkoyan (red card) 79'	Stadium: Alashkert Stadium; Attendance: 0 Referee: Zaven Hovhannisyan
Note: Match played behind closed doors due to the COVID-19 pandemic.

14 July 2020 28	Shirak	2 – 4	Alashkert	Gyumri
17:30 (UTC+4)	M.Kone 35' (pen.), 87'; Miličić (yellow card) 53'; R.Mkrtchyan (yellow card) 68'	Report	Marmentini 20'; Tiago Cametá (yellow card) 34'; Voskanyan (yellow card) 39'; Bryan 51'; Gome (yellow card) 58'; Thiago Galvão 62'; N.Tankov 72'	Stadium: Gyumri City Stadium; Attendance: 0 Referee: Shahen Aghayan
Note: Match played behind closed doors due to the COVID-19 pandemic.

===== Table =====
Pos	Team	Pld	W	D	L	GF	GA	GD	Pts	Qualification
1	Ararat-Armenia (C)	28	15	7	6	45	23	+22	52	Qualification for the Champions League first qualifying round
2	Noah	28	14	6	8	37	27	+10	48	Qualification for the Europa League first qualifying round (Note: team qualified for the Europa League first qualifying round by winning the 2019–20 Armenian Cup.)
3	Alashkert	28	14	5	9	51	31	+20	47	Qualification for the Europa League first qualifying round
4	Shirak	28	13	7	8	40	30	+10	46	Qualification for the Europa League first qualifying round
5	Lori	27	10	10	7	35	33	+2	40	(Note: Match between Lori and Ararat Yerevan was cancelled on 10 July, with no points being awarded.)
6	Ararat	27	9	6	12	31	36	−5	33	(Note: Match between Lori and Ararat Yerevan was cancelled on 10 July, with no points being awarded.)

Source: Soccerway
Rules for classification: 1) Points; 2) Play-off (only if deciding champion); 3) Matches won; 4) Head-to-head points; 5) Head-to-head matches won; 6) Head-to-head goal difference; 7) Head-to-head goals scored; 8) Head-to-head away goals scored; 9) Goal difference; 10) Goals scored.
(C) Champions

=== Armenian Cup ===
1 November 2019 Second Round	Gandzasar Kapan	2 – 1	Shirak	Yerevan
15:00 (UTC+4)	A.Mensah 23'; G.Ohanyan (yellow card) 35'; G.Harutyunyan 40'; D.Minasyan (yellow card) 81'; E.Yeghiazaryan (yellow card) 87'	Report	Udo 10'; Miličić (yellow card) 56'; A.Muradyan (yellow card) 85'	Stadium: Yerevan Football Academy; Attendance: 120; Referee: Henrik Nalbandyan
Note: Match played at the Yerevan Football Academy in Yerevan, instead of Gandzasar Kapan regular Gandzasar Stadium in Kapan.

== Statistics ==
As of match played 14 July 2020

=== Appearances and goals ===
No.	Pos	Nat	Player	Total		Premier League		Armenian Cup	
No.	Pos	Nat	Player	Apps	Goals	Apps	Goals	Apps	Goals
4	DF	(Armenia) ARM	Artyom Mikaelyan	13	0	11+1	0	1	0
6	DF	(Serbia) SRB	Marko Prljević	26	0	24+1	0	1	0
7	MF	(Armenia) ARM	Arman Aslanyan	27	1	17+9	1	1	0
8	DF	(Armenia) ARM	Zhirayr Margaryan	27	2	18+8	2	1	0
9	FW	(Armenia) ARM	Aram Muradyan	16	1	1+14	1	1	0
10	MF	(Armenia) ARM	Edgar Malakyan	23	0	19+4	0	0	0
11	MF	(Nigeria) NGR	Solomon Udo	25	3	20+4	2	1	1
17	FW	(Armenia) ARM	Arlen Tsaturyan	1	0	0+1	0	0	0
18	MF	(Armenia) ARM	Rafik Misakyan	12	1	6+5	1	0+1	0
19	MF	(Armenia) ARM	Karen Muradyan	28	0	25+2	0	1	0
20	MF	(Armenia) ARM	Rudik Mkrtchyan	18	1	11+6	1	1	0
21	FW	(Russia) RUS	Artyom Gevorkyan	22	2	12+9	2	1	0
22	DF	(Armenia) ARM	Hrayr Mkoyan	19	0	19	0	0	0
23	DF	(Serbia) SRB	Bogdan Miličić	27	0	25+1	0	1	0
25	DF	(Armenia) ARM	Aghvan Davoyan	17	0	16+1	0	0	0
38	FW	(Armenia) ARM	Albert Darbinyan	2	0	0+1	0	0+1	0
39	FW	(Armenia) ARM	Lyova Mryan	5	0	0+5	0	0	0
45	GK	(Russia) RUS	Vsevolod Yermakov	29	0	28	0	1	0
70	FW	(Serbia) SRB	Uroš Nenadović	10	2	5+5	2	0	0
77	MF	(Armenia) ARM	David Manoyan	13	0	9+4	0	0	0
95	DF	(Armenia) ARM	Vardan Arzoyan	2	0	0+2	0	0	0
98	FW	(Ivory Coast) CIV	Mory Kone	29	23	28	23	0+1	0
99	DF	(Ivory Coast) CIV	Junior Avo Leibe	11	0	3+8	0	0	0
Players who left Shirak during the season:
88	MF	(Ivory Coast) CIV	Moussa Bakayoko	12	3	11+1	3	0	0

=== Goal scorers ===
Place	Position	Nation	Number	Name	Premier League	Armenian Cup	Total
1	FW	(Ivory Coast)	98	Mory Kone	23	0	23
2	MF	(Ivory Coast)	88	Moussa Bakayoko	3	0	3
2	MF	(Nigeria)	11	Solomon Udo	2	1	3
4	FW	(Russia)	21	Artyom Gevorkyan	2	0	2
4	FW	(Serbia)	70	Uroš Nenadović	2	0	2
4	DF	(Armenia)	8	Zhirayr Margaryan	2	0	2
4				Own goal	2	0	2
8	FW	(Armenia)	9	Aram Muradyan	1	0	1
8	MF	(Armenia)	7	Arman Aslanyan	1	0	1
8	MF	(Armenia)	18	Rafik Misakyan	1	0	1
8	MF	(Armenia)	20	Rudik Mkrtchyan	1	0	1
				TOTALS	40	1	41

=== Clean sheets ===
Place	Position	Nation	Number	Name	Premier League	Armenian Cup	Total
1	GK	(Russia)	45	Vsevolod Yermakov	8	0	8
				TOTALS	8	0	8

=== Disciplinary record ===
Number	Nation	Position	Name	Premier League		Armenian Cup		Total	
Number	Nation	Position	Name	Yellow card	Red card	Yellow card	Red card	Yellow card	Red card
4	(Armenia)	DF	Artyom Mikaelyan	1	0	0	0	1	0
6	(Serbia)	DF	Marko Prljević	4	1	0	0	4	1
7	(Armenia)	MF	Arman Aslanyan	4	0	0	0	4	0
8	(Armenia)	DF	Zhirayr Margaryan	2	1	0	0	2	1
9	(Armenia)	FW	Aram Muradyan	1	0	1	0	2	0
10	(Armenia)	MF	Edgar Malakyan	2	0	0	0	2	0
11	(Nigeria)	MF	Solomon Udo	1	0	0	0	1	0
17	(Armenia)	FW	Arlen Tsaturyan	1	0	0	0	1	0
18	(Armenia)	MF	Rafik Misakyan	2	0	0	0	2	0
19	(Armenia)	MF	Karen Muradyan	4	1	0	0	4	1
20	(Armenia)	MF	Rudik Mkrtchyan	1	0	0	0	1	0
21	(Russia)	FW	Artyom Gevorkyan	5	0	0	0	5	0
22	(Armenia)	DF	Hrayr Mkoyan	2	2	0	0	2	2
23	(Serbia)	DF	Bogdan Miličić	4	0	1	0	5	0
25	(Armenia)	DF	Aghvan Davoyan	1	0	0	0	1	0
39	(Armenia)	FW	Lyova Mryan	1	0	0	0	1	0
45	(Russia)	GK	Vsevolod Yermakov	2	0	0	0	2	0
70	(Serbia)	FW	Uroš Nenadović	1	0	0	0	1	0
77	(Armenia)	MF	David Manoyan	2	0	0	0	2	0
95	(Armenia)	DF	Vardan Arzoyan	1	0	0	0	1	0
98	(Ivory Coast)	FW	Mory Kone	3	0	0	0	3	0
99	(Ivory Coast)	DF	Junior Avo Leibe	1	0	0	0	1	0
Players who left Shirak during the season:
88	(Ivory Coast)	MF	Moussa Bakayoko	3	0	0	0	3	0
			TOTALS	50	4	2	0	52	4
