= 2019–20 FC Urartu season =

Urartu
2019-20 season
- Chairman: Hrach Aghabekian
- Manager: Ilshat Fayzulin (until 24 November); Aleksandr Grigoryan (from 24 November)
- Stadium: Urartu Stadium
- Armenian Premier League: 7th
- Armenian Cup: Semifinal vs Noah
- Europa League: First qualifying round vs Čukarički
- Top goalscorer: League: Yevgeni Kobzar (7); All: Yevgeni Kobzar (9)

The 2019–20 season is Urartu's nineteenth consecutive season in the Armenian Premier League.

== Season events ==
On 2 August 2019, FC Banants was officially renamed Urartu FC.

On 24 November, Ilshat Fayzulin resigned as manager, with Aleksandr Grigoryan being announced as his replacement the same day.

On 6 December 2019, Aram Bareghamyan and Edward Kpodo signed new contracts with Urartu.

On 13 January, Aram Ayrapetyan left Urartu.

On 13 February, Narek Petrosyan left Urartu by mutual agreement.

On 12 March 2020, the Football Federation of Armenia announced that all Armenian Premier League games had been postponed until 23 March, and that the Armenian Cup Semifinal second legs had also been postponed due to the COVID-19 pandemic.

== Squad ==
As of match played 28 June 2020

No.	Name	Nationality	Position	Date of birth (age)	Signed from	Signed in	Contract ends	Apps.	Goals
Goalkeepers
1	Anatoliy Ayvazov	(Armenia)	GK	8 June 1996 (aged 24)	Shirak	2018		20	0
22	Grigori Matevosyan	(Russia)	GK	9 June 1999 (aged 21)	loan from Armavir	2018		0	0
24	Arsen Beglaryan	(Armenia)	GK	18 February 1993 (aged 27)	Dnyapro Mogilev	2020		4	0
Defenders
6	Ebert	(Brazil)	DF	25 May 1993 (aged 27)	Botev Plovdiv	2020		5	0
15	Hrachya Geghamyan	(Armenia)	DF	2 December 1999 (aged 20)	Academy	2018		3	0
19	Yevgeni Osipov	(Russia)	DF	29 October 1986 (aged 33)	FCI Levadia	2020		6	0
23	Narek Petrosyan	(Armenia)	DF	25 January 1996 (aged 24)	Academy	2015		88	0
25	Rubén Ramírez	(Venezuela)	DF	18 October 1995 (aged 24)	Atlético Venezuela	2019		16	0
30	Edward Kpodo	(Ghana)	DF	14 January 1990 (aged 30)	Shirak	2018		66	4
33	Arsen Sadoyan	(Armenia)	DF	16 March 1999 (aged 21)	Academy	2019		1	0
77	Erik Simonyan	(Armenia)	DF	12 June 2003 (aged 17)	Academy	2019		1	0
99	Robert Darbinyan	(Armenia)	DF	4 October 1995 (aged 24)	Ararat-Armenia	2019		31	0
Midfielders
5	Hakob Hakobyan	(Armenia)	MF	29 March 1997 (aged 23)	Academy	2014			
7	Aram Bareghamyan	(Armenia)	MF	6 January 1988 (aged 32)	Alashkert	2016			
8	Jurica Grgec	(Croatia)	MF	1 September 1992 (aged 27)	Hapoel Afula	2019		23	0
10	Karen Melkonyan	(Armenia)	MF	16 May 1992 (aged 28)	Academy	2016		68	5
14	Joseph Sunday	(Nigeria)	MF	23 February 2002 (aged 18)	loan from ?	2020	2021	2	0
17	Taymuraz Toboyev	(Russia)	MF	9 March 1995 (aged 25)	Ararat Yerevan	2020		2	0
18	Vahagn Ayvazyan	(Armenia)	MF	16 April 1992 (aged 28)	Al-Nasr	2020			
26	Reda Bellahcene	(Algeria)	MF	21 January 1993 (aged 27)	DRB Tadjenanet	2020		0	0
27	Uchenna Udoka	(Nigeria)	MF	6 May 2000 (aged 20)	loan from ?	2020	2021	0	0
29	Peter Mutumosi	(Democratic Republic of the Congo)	MF	25 May 1998 (aged 22)	Motema Pembe	2020		12	0
39	David Papikyan	(Russia)	MF	8 July 2001 (aged 18)	loan from Armavir	2019	2020	3	0
91	Marko Brtan	(Croatia)	MF	7 April 1991 (aged 29)	Krupa	2019		16	0
Forwards
9	Yevgeni Kobzar	(Russia)	FW	9 August 1992 (aged 27)	Spartaks Jūrmala	2019		37	11
11	Igor Paderin	(Russia)	FW	24 November 1989 (aged 30)	Armavir	2020		3	1
18	Juan Carlos Azócar	(Venezuela)	FW	1 October 1995 (aged 24)	loan from Deportivo La Guaira	2019		15	2
21	Erik Petrosyan	(Armenia)	FW	19 February 1998 (aged 22)	Pyunik	2018		12	3
28	Abraham Portugalyan	(Armenia)	FW	8 January 1999 (aged 21)	Academy	2019		6	1
55	Samvel Hakobyan	(Armenia)	FW	30 April 2003 (aged 17)	Academy	2020		1	0
78	Gevorg Tarakhchyan	(Armenia)	FW	15 March 2002 (aged 18)	Academy	2019		6	0
93	Semyon Sinyavsky	(Russia)	FW	30 September 1993 (aged 26)	Armavir	2019		19	2
Players out on loan
	Edgar Grigoryan	(Armenia)	MF	25 August 1998 (aged 20)	Academy	2019		0	0
	Davit Paremuzyan	(Armenia)	MF	2 March 2000 (aged 19)	Academy	2019		0	0
Players who left during the season
4	Andranik Voskanyan	(Armenia)	DF	11 April 1990 (aged 30)	Alashkert	2019		8	0
6	Guy Magema	(Democratic Republic of the Congo)	DF	24 January 1996 (aged 24)	Kabuscorp	2019		0	0
11	Artak Dashyan	(Armenia)	MF	20 November 1989 (aged 30)	Alashkert	2019			
14	Adamu Abdullahi	(Nigeria)	MF	1 January 1994 (aged 26)	Waiheke United	2018		25	3
16	Pape Camara	(Senegal)	MF	24 September 1991 (aged 28)	RFC Seraing	2018		40	1
20	Igor Stanojević	(Serbia)	MF	24 October 1991 (aged 28)	Shirak	2018		35	3
55	Miloš Nikolić	(Serbia)	DF	22 February 1989 (aged 31)	Zvijezda 09	2019		12	1
70	Aram Ayrapetyan	(Armenia)	GK	22 November 1986 (aged 33)	Ararat Yerevan	2017		74	0
78	Aleksandar Glišić	(Bosnia and Herzegovina)	FW	3 September 1992 (aged 27)	Radnik Bijeljina	2019		16	5
90	Yevhen Budnik	(Ukraine)	FW	4 September 1990 (aged 29)	FCI Levadia	2019		11	4

== Transfers ==
=== In ===
Date	Position	Nationality	Name	From	Fee	Ref.
Summer 2019	DF	(Democratic Republic of the Congo)	Guy Magema	Urartu-2	Promoted	
Summer 2019	MF	(Democratic Republic of the Congo)	Peter Mutumosi	Motema Pembe	Undisclosed	
13 June 2019	MF	(Armenia)	Artak Dashyan	Alashkert	Undisclosed	
1 July 2019	FW	(Russia)	Semyon Sinyavsky	Armavir	Undisclosed	
5 July 2019	DF	(Serbia)	Miloš Nikolić	Zvijezda 09	Undisclosed	
1 August 2019	MF	(Croatia)	Jurica Grgec	Hapoel Afula	Undisclosed	
28 August 2019	DF	(Venezuela)	Rubén Ramírez	Atlético Venezuela	Undisclosed	
1 September 2019	MF	(Croatia)	Marko Brtan	Krupa	Undisclosed	
1 September 2019	FW	(Ukraine)	Yevhen Budnik	FCI Levadia	Undisclosed	
16 January 2020	DF	(Russia)	Yevgeni Osipov	Levadia Tallinn	Undisclosed	
3 February 2020	DF	(Brazil)	Ebert	Botev Plovdiv	Free	
4 February 2020	MF	(Russia)	Taymuraz Toboyev	Ararat Yerevan	Free	
5 February 2020	GK	(Armenia)	Arsen Beglaryan	Dnyapro Mogilev	Undisclosed	
14 February 2020	FW	(Russia)	Igor Paderin	Armavir	Undisclosed	
2 March 2020	MF	(Algeria)	Reda Bellahcene	MC Alger	Undisclosed	
10 March 2020	DF	(Armenia)	Vahagn Ayvazyan	Al-Nasr	Undisclosed	

=== Loans in ===
Date from	Position	Nationality	Name	From	Date to	Ref.
2 July 2018	GK	(Russia)	Grigori Matevosyan	Armavir	End of season	
1 September 2019	FW	(Venezuela)	Juan Carlos Azócar	Deportivo La Guaira	Undisclosed	
28 February 2020	MF	(Nigeria)	Uchenna Udoka		10 December 2021	
29 February 2020	MF	(Nigeria)	Joseph Sunday		10 December 2021	

=== Out ===
Date	Position	Nationality	Name	To	Fee	Ref.
Summer 2019	MF	(Nigeria)	Solomon Udo	Shirak	Undisclosed	
13 September 2019	DF	(Armenia)	Vahagn Ayvazyan	Al-Nasr	Undisclosed	
11 December 2019	MF	(Senegal)	Pape Abdou Camara	Alashkert	Undisclosed	
24 February 2020	DF	(Democratic Republic of the Congo)	Guy Magema	Pyunik	Undisclosed	

=== Loans out ===
Date from	Position	Nationality	Name	To	Date to	Ref.
Summer 2019	FW	(Armenia)	Abraham Portugalyan	Yerevan	Winter 2020	
30 July 2019	MF	(Armenia)	Davit Paremuzyan	Lori	End of Season	
30 July 2019	MF	(Armenia)	Edgar Grigoryan	Noah	End of Season	

=== Released ===
Date	Position	Nationality	Name	Joined	Date
20 August 2019	FW	(Bosnia and Herzegovina)	Aleksandar Glišić	Alashkert	21 August 2019
5 December 2019	DF	(Armenia)	Andranik Voskanyan	Van	
5 December 2019	DF	(Serbia)	Miloš Nikolić	Dubočica	30 July 2020
5 December 2019	MF	(Nigeria)	Adamu Abdullahi		
13 January 2020	GK	(Armenia)	Aram Ayrapetyan	Paykan	
16 January 2020	FW	(Ukraine)	Yevhen Budnik	Persita Tangerang	3 February 2020
13 February 2020	DF	(Armenia)	Narek Petrosyan	Urartu	
24 February 2020	MF	(Armenia)	Artak Dashyan	Atyrau	6 March 2020
Winter 2020	MF	(Serbia)	Igor Stanojević	Mačva Šabac	
30 June 2020	DF	(Armenia)	Vahagn Ayvazyan	Van	31 July 2020
1 July 2020	MF	(Armenia)	Aram Bareghamyan	Retired	
3 July 2020	DF	(Venezuela)	Rubén Ramírez		
3 July 2020	MF	(Croatia)	Marco Brtan	Borac Banja Luka	4 July 2020
3 July 2020	MF	(Croatia)	Jurica Grgec	NK Varaždin	12 August 2020
3 July 2020	FW	(Russia)	Semyon Sinyavsky	Kuban-Holding Pavlovskaya	13 August 2020
4 July 2020	DF	(Ghana)	Edward Kpodo	Berekum Chelsea	29 October 2020
9 July 2020	FW	(Russia)	Igor Paderin	Retired	
13 July 2020	MF	(Russia)	Taymuraz Toboyev	Kolomna	2 October 2020
14 July 2020	DF	(Brazil)	Ebert	Van	31 July 2020

== Friendlies ==
18 January 2020	Urartu	3 – 0	Lokomotiv Yerevan	Yerevan
17:30 (UTC+4)	Sinyavsky 23'; Azócar 45'; Trialist 82'	Report		Stadium: Urartu Stadium

21 January 2020	Urartu	4 – 1	West Armenia	Yerevan
16:00 (UTC+4)	A.Bareghamyan 45' (pen.); E.Petrosyan 67'; K.Melkonyan 79'; Trialist 87'	Report	R.Makhmedov 17'	Stadium: Urartu Stadium

24 January 2020	Urartu (Armenia)	0 – 1	(Russia) Armavir	Yerevan
12:00 (UTC+4)		Report	Polyakov 68'	Stadium: Urartu Stadium

28 January 2020	Urartu	0 – 2	Alashkert	Yerevan
16:00 (UTC+4)		Report	Thiago Galvão 12'; Trialist 68'	Stadium: Urartu Stadium

5 February 2020	Urartu	3 – 0	Van	Yerevan
16:00 (UTC+4)	Dashyan 29'; J.Grgec 73'; A.Sadoyan 79'	Report		Stadium: Urartu Stadium

8 February 2020	Urartu (Armenia)	0 – 0	(Russia) Ufa	Cyprus
19:00 (UTC+4)		Report

13 February 2020	Urartu (Armenia)	0 – 1	(Lithuania) Sūduva	Cyprus
17:00 (UTC+4)		Report	Salamon 43'

17 February 2020	Urartu (Armenia)	1 – 0	(Switzerland) Cham	Ormideia, Cyprus
13:30 (UTC+4)	Kobzar 50'	Report		Stadium: Ormideia Municipality Stadium

18 February 2020	Urartu (Armenia)	1 – 2	(Russia) Tekstilshchik Ivanovo	Ormideia, Cyprus
(UTC+4)	Toboyev 40'	Report	Marichev 1'; Sidorov 48'	Stadium: Ormideia Municipality Stadium

26 February 2020	Urartu	0 – 2	Alashkert	Yerevan
(UTC+4)		Report	Camara 6'; Glišić 70'

11 May 2020	Urartu	1 – 2	Lokomotiv Yerevan	Yerevan
(UTC+4)	Sinyavsky 6' (pen.)	Report	Hluschuk 28'; A.Pilipenko 79' (pen.)	Stadium: Urartu Training Ground; Attendance: 0

14 May 2020	Urartu	v	West Armenia	Yerevan
(UTC+4)		Report		Stadium: Urartu Training Ground; Attendance: 0

17 May 2020	Urartu	0 – 2	Gandzasar Kapan	Yerevan
(UTC+4)		Report	G.Harutyunyan 9' (pen.), 48'	Stadium: Urartu Training Ground; Attendance: 0

== Competitions ==
=== Armenian Premier League ===
==== Regular season ====
===== Results summary =====
Overall								Home						Away					
Pld	W	D	L	GF	GA	GD	Pts	W	D	L	GF	GA	GD	W	D	L	GF	GA	GD
18	6	5	7	22	24	−2	23	3	4	2	12	11	+1	3	1	5	10	13	−3

Last updated: 26 May 2020.
Source: See Results

===== Results =====
2 August 2019 1	Shirak	3 – 1	Urartu	Gyumri
17:00 (UTC+4)	Gevorkyan 19'; M.Kone 40', 58'; A.Aslanyan (yellow card) 53'	Report	Kobzar 71'; Dashyan (red card) 88'	Stadium: Gyumri City Stadium; Attendance: 700; Referee: Artur Safaryan

11 August 2019 2	Urartu	0 – 3	Pyunik	Yerevan
19:30 (UTC+4)	J.Grgec (yellow card) 65'	Report	Belov (yellow card) 19'; Yedigaryan 78'; Miranyan 82'; Simonyan 90+1'	Stadium: Banants Stadium; Attendance: 730; Referee: Zaven Hovhannisyan

17 August 2019 3	Alashkert	2 – 1	Urartu	Yerevan
17:15 (UTC+4)	Marmentini 20'; Ishkhanyan (yellow card) 30'; Tankov 54'	Report	H. Hakobyan 12'; Nikolić (yellow card) 43'	Stadium: Alashkert Stadium; Attendance: 400; Referee: Henrik Nalbandyan

24 August 2019 4	Urartu	1 – 1	Gandzasar Kapan	Yerevan
19:30 (UTC+4)	Kpodo (yellow card) 10'; Ayrapetyan (yellow card) 11'; V.Ayvazyan 53'; Stanojević (yellow card) 74'; Camara (yellow card) 90+3'	Report	A.Bareghamyan 54' (o.g.); Ar.Hovhannisyan (yellow card) 78'; D.Minasyan (yellow card) 89'	Stadium: Urartu Stadium; Attendance: 600; Referee: Ashot Ghaltakchyan

29 August 2019 5	Noah	2 – 0	Urartu	Yerevan
17:00 (UTC+4)	Manoyan 17'; Mayrovich 57'	Report	Darbinyan (yellow card) 45'; Nikolić (yellow card) 90'	Stadium: Alashkert Stadium; Attendance: 370; Referee: Artur Safaryan
Note: Match played at the Alashkert Stadium in Yerevan, instead of Gandzasar Kapan regular Gandzasar Stadium in Kapan.

13 September 2019 6	Urartu	1 – 1	Ararat-Armenia	Yerevan
19:15 (UTC+4)	Budnik 34'; Mutumosi (yellow card) 48'; Darbinyan (yellow card) 54'	Report	Ângelo (yellow card) 83'; Louis 85'	Stadium: Urartu Stadium; Attendance: 620; Referee: Suren Baliyan

17 September 2019 7	Lori	2 – 1	Urartu	Vanadzor
16:00 (UTC+4)	Zayerko 16'; J.Ufuoma (yellow card) 30'; X.Auzmendi 37'	Report	Kobzar 8'; Nikolić (yellow card) 14'; P.Mutumosi (yellow card) 49'; Darbinyan (yellow card) 90+3'	Stadium: Vanadzor Football Academy; Attendance: 300; Referee: Edgar Sahakyan

21 September 2019 8	Yerevan	0 – 1	Urartu	Vanadzor
16:00 (UTC+4)	Demidchik (yellow card) 56'	Report	M.Brtan (yellow card) 44'; Kobzar 64'	Stadium: Vanadzor City Stadium; Attendance: 50; Referee: Edgar Sahakyan
Note: Match played at the Vanadzor City Stadium in Vanadzor, instead of Yerevan's regular Vazgen Sargsyan Republican Stadium in Yerevan.

29 September 2019 9	Urartu	1 – 0	Ararat Yerevan	Yerevan
19:00 (UTC+4)	Nikolić (yellow card) 57' (goal) 79'	Report	Davidyan (yellow card) 88'; Dedechko (yellow card) 90+3'	Stadium: Urartu Stadium; Attendance: 500; Referee: Artur Simonyan

5 October 2019 10	Urartu	2 – 2	Shirak	Yerevan
19:00 (UTC+4)	Kobzar 28'; Darbinyan (yellow card) 36'; Kpodo (yellow card) 52'; Nikolić (yellow card) 55'; J.Grgec (yellow card) 78'; K.Melkonyan 88'; Camara (yellow card) 90+2'	Report	M.Kone 58', 82'	Stadium: Urartu Stadium; Attendance: 400; Referee: Henrik Nalbandyan

20 October 2019 11	Pyunik	1 – 2	Urartu	Yerevan
17:30 (UTC+4)	Grigoryan (yellow card) 21'; Marku (yellow card) 36'; Alfred (yellow card) 40'; Yedigaryan 81'; Dragojević (yellow card) 90+2'; Manucharyan (yellow card) 90+3'	Report	Azócar 8'; Voskanyan (red card) 17'; Budnik 26'; Kobzar (yellow card) 45+1'; A.Ayvazov (yellow card) 88'	Stadium: Vazgen Sargsyan Republican Stadium; Attendance: 600; Referee: Artur Safaryan

25 October 2019 12	Urartu	2 – 4	Alashkert	Yerevan
19:00 (UTC+4)	Budnik 15'; N.Petrosyan (yellow card) 30'; Azócar 50'	Report	Glišić 43', 54' (yellow card) 61'; E.Avagyan 84'; Avagyan (yellow card) 90+3'	Stadium: Urartu Stadium; Attendance: 300; Referee: Zaven Hovhannisyan

8 November 2019 13	Gandzasar Kapan	2 – 4	Urartu	Yerevan
15:00 (UTC+4)	G.Harutyunyan 23' (pen.); A.Mensah (yellow card) 63'; Pogosyan 74'; D.Terteryan (yellow card) 90+3'	Report	M.Brtan (yellow card) 16'; Sinyavsky 39', 53'; Kpodo (yellow card) 66'; Budnik 79'; Camara (yellow card) 81'; Ayrapetyan (yellow card) 84'; Kobzar 90'	Stadium: Yerevan Football Academy; Attendance: 200; Referee: Artur Simonyan
Note: Match played at the Yerevan Football Academy in Yerevan, instead of Gandzasar Kapan regular Gandzasar Stadium in Kapan.

23 November 2019 14	Urartu	0 – 0	Noah	Yerevan
18:00 (UTC+4)	Kpodo (yellow card) 72'; Budnik (yellow card) 74'; Camara (yellow card) 90'	Report	Azarov (yellow card) 73'; Tatayev (yellow card) 90'; Kryuchkov (yellow card) 90+3'	Stadium: Urartu Stadium; Attendance: 200; Referee: Artur Safaryan

1 December 2019 15	Ararat-Armenia	0 – 0	Urartu	Yerevan
15:00 (UTC+4)	Ambartsumyan (yellow card) 10'; Avanesyan (yellow card) 90+1'	Report	Sinyavsky (yellow card) 90+3'	Stadium: Yerevan Football Academy Stadium; Attendance: 200; Referee: Suren Baliyan

2 March 2020 16	Urartu	2 – 0	Lori	Yerevan
17:00 (UTC+4)	Kobzar 12'; H. Hakobyan (yellow card) 24' (yellow-red card) 90+3'; A.Ayvazov (yellow card) 33'; Paderin 45'; Sinyavsky (yellow card) 47'	Report	Désiré (yellow card) 39'; Alexis (yellow card) 47'; J.Ufuoma (yellow card) 88'	Stadium: Urartu Stadium; Attendance: 300; Referee: Artur Safaryan

7 March 2020 17	Urartu	3 – 0	Yerevan	Yerevan
(UTC+4)				Stadium: Urartu Stadium
Note: Match awarded as a 3-0 to Alashkert after Yerevan withdrew from the league.

25 May 2020 18	Ararat Yerevan	1 – 0	Urartu	Yerevan
18:30 (UTC+4)	Welsen Junior (yellow card) 28'; Vitinho (yellow card) 45'; Khurtsidze 54'; Rafinha (yellow card) 57'; Haruna (yellow card) 59'; Dedechko (yellow card) 90+5'	Report	J.Grgec (yellow card) 79'	Stadium: Yerevan Football Academy Stadium; Attendance: 0 Referee: Shahen Aghayan
Note: Match played behind closed doors. Match was originally scheduled for 16 March, but postponed on 13 March due to the COVID-19 pandemic.

===== Table =====
Pos	Team	Pld	W	D	L	GF	GA	GD	Pts	Qualification
1	Ararat-Armenia	18	11	3	4	33	15	+18	36	Qualification for the Championship round
2	Lori	18	9	5	4	27	19	+8	32	Qualification for the Championship round
3	Alashkert	18	9	4	5	33	20	+13	31	Qualification for the Championship round
4	Ararat	18	9	4	5	25	18	+7	31	Qualification for the Championship round
5	Noah	18	9	3	6	25	19	+6	30	Qualification for the Championship round
6	Shirak	18	8	4	6	25	18	+7	28	Qualification for the Championship round
7	Pyunik	18	7	2	9	35	36	−1	23	Qualification for the Relegation round
8	Urartu	18	6	5	7	22	24	−2	23	Qualification for the Relegation round
9	Gandzasar	18	4	6	8	20	25	−5	18	Qualification for the Relegation round
10	Yerevan (R, D)	18	0	0	18	11	62	−51	0	Withdrawn

Source: Soccerway
Rules for classification: 1) Points; 2) Play-off (only if deciding champion); 3) Matches won; 4) Head-to-head points; 5) Head-to-head matches won; 6) Head-to-head goal difference; 7) Head-to-head goals scored; 8) Head-to-head away goals scored; 9) Goal difference; 10) Goals scored.
(D) Disqualified; (R) Relegated

==== Relegation round ====
===== Results summary =====
Overall								Home						Away					
Pld	W	D	L	GF	GA	GD	Pts	W	D	L	GF	GA	GD	W	D	L	GF	GA	GD
4	2	1	1	4	3	+1	7	1	0	1	1	1	0	1	1	0	3	2	+1

Last updated: 28 June 2020.
Source: See Results

===== Results =====
1 June 2020 19	Urartu	1 – 0	Gandzasar Kapan	Yerevan
19:30 (UTC+4)	H. Hakobyan 35'	Report		Stadium: Urartu Stadium; Attendance: 0 Referee: Vardan Manukyan
Note: Match played behind closed doors due to the COVID-19 pandemic.

9 June 2020 21	Pyunik	1 – 2	Urartu	Yerevan
18:30 (UTC+4)	Belov (yellow card) 71'; E.Azizyan 89' (yellow card) 90+2'; Manucharyan (yellow card) 90+4'	Report	H. Hakobyan (yellow card) 26'; E.Petrosyan 63'; A.Portugalyan 80'	Stadium: Vazgen Sargsyan Republican Stadium; Attendance: 0 Referee: Erik Galstyan
Note: Match played behind closed doors due to the COVID-19 pandemic.

17 June 2020 24	Gandzasar Kapan	1 – 1	Urartu	Yerevan
18:30 (UTC+4)	G.Harutyunyan 18'; Aslanyan (yellow card) 32'; A.Mensah (yellow card) 49'; As.Kocharyan (yellow card) 58'; E.Yeghiazaryan (yellow card) 88'	Report	Kobzar 21'; N.Petrosyan (yellow card) 64'	Stadium: Yerevan Football Academy; Attendance: 0 Referee: Artur Tavakalyan
Note: Match played at the Yerevan Football Academy in Yerevan, instead of Gandzasar Kapan regular Gandzasar Stadium in Kapan. Match played behind closed doors due to the COVID-19 pandemic.

28 June 2020 25	Urartu	0 – 1	Pyunik	Yerevan
19:30 (UTC+4)		Report	Adah 41'; Belov (yellow card) 70'; A.Manucharyan (yellow card) 74'	Stadium: Urartu Stadium; Attendance: 0 Referee: Artem Gasparyan
Note: Match played behind closed doors due to the COVID-19 pandemic.

===== Table =====
Pos	Team	Pld	W	D	L	GF	GA	GD	Pts
1	Urartu	22	8	6	8	26	27	−1	30
2	Pyunik	22	8	2	12	39	42	−3	26
3	Gandzasar	22	6	7	9	25	29	−4	25

Source: Soccerway
Rules for classification: 1) Points; 2) Play-off (only if deciding champion); 3) Matches won; 4) Head-to-head points; 5) Head-to-head matches won; 6) Head-to-head goal difference; 7) Head-to-head goals scored; 8) Head-to-head away goals scored; 9) Goal difference; 10) Goals scored.

=== Armenian Cup ===
2 November 2019 Second Round	Pyunik	0 – 0 (3 – 5 p)	Urartu	Yerevan
16:00 (UTC+4)	Stankov (yellow card) 80'; Robert Hakobyan (yellow card) 90'	Report		Stadium: Yerevan Football Academy Stadium; Attendance: 350; Referee: Zaven Hovhannisyan

27 November 2019 Quarterfinal	Lori	0 – 1	Urartu	Vanadzor
14:30 (UTC+4)	A.Avagyan (yellow card) 7'; V.Shahatuni (yellow card) 80'; J.Ufuoma (red card) 87'; Luiz Matheus (yellow card) 90+3'	Report	Camara (yellow card) 7'; Kobzar 31' (yellow card) 84'; J.Grgec (yellow card) 80'; A.Ayvazov (yellow card) 90+3'	Stadium: Vanadzor Football Academy; Attendance: 200; Referee: Artur Safaryan

11 March 2020 Semifinal 1st leg	Urartu	0 – 1	Noah	Yerevan
18:00 (UTC+4)	Paderin (yellow card) 45+1'	Report	S.Gomes (yellow card) 23' (yellow-red card) 87'; A.Tatayev 30'; Spătaru (yellow card) 90+2'	Stadium: Urartu Stadium; Attendance: 1,000; Referee: Ashot Ghaltakchyan

24 June 2020 Semifinal 2nd leg	Noah	2 – 1 (3 – 1 agg.)	Urartu	Yerevan
17:30 (UTC+4)	Mayrovich 3' (pen.); Gareginyan (red card) 20'; H.Manga (yellow card) 44'; Lavrishchev 78'; V.Vimercati (yellow card) 78'; Kagermazov (yellow card) 78'; M.Shvagirev (yellow card) 82'	Report	P.Mutumosi (yellow card) 2'; Darbinyan (yellow card) 7'; Kobzar 23'; Paderin (yellow card) 79'; Ebert (yellow card) 83'	Stadium: Alashkert Stadium; Attendance: 0 Referee: Henrik Nalbandyan
Note: Match to be played at the Yerevan Football Academy Stadium in Yerevan, instead of Pyunik's regular Vazgen Sargsyan Republican Stadium in Yerevan. Match originally scheduled for 22 March, but postponed on 13 March due to the COVID-19 pandemic.

=== UEFA Europa League ===
==== Qualifying rounds ====
11 July 2019 First qualifying round 1st leg	Čukarički (Serbia)	3 – 0	(Armenia) Banants	Belgrade, Serbia
22:30 (UTC+4)	Kovač (yellow card) 20' (goal) 80'; Tedić 43', 90+2'; Bogosavac (yellow card) 86'	Report	Camara (yellow card) 42'; V.Ayvazyan (yellow card) 62'; Kpodo (yellow card) 86'; Voskanyan (yellow card) 86'; A.Bareghamyan (yellow card) 89'	Stadium: Čukarički Stadium; Attendance: 1,203; Referee: Ívar Orri Kristjánsson (Iceland)
Note: FC Banants changed their name to FC Urartu on 2 August 2019.

16 July 2019 First qualifying round 2nd leg	Banants (Armenia)	0 – 5 (0 – 8 agg.)	(Serbia) Čukarički	Yerevan, Armenia
19:00 (UTC+4)	V.Ayvazyan (yellow card) 43'; Kpodo (yellow card) 74'; Dashyan (yellow card) 84'; Kobzar (yellow card) 90+1'	Report	Stojanović 3'; Tedić 31'; Luković 50', 76' (pen.); S.Šapić (yellow card) 58'; Birmančević 71'	Stadium: Banants Stadium; Referee: Ioannis Papadopoulos (Greece)
Note: FC Banants changed their name to FC Urartu on 2 August 2019.

== Statistics ==
As of match played 28 June 2020

=== Appearances and goals ===
No.	Pos	Nat	Player	Total		Premier League		Armenian Cup		Europa League	
No.	Pos	Nat	Player	Apps	Goals	Apps	Goals	Apps	Goals	Apps	Goals
1	GK	(Armenia) ARM	Anatoliy Ayvazov	11	0	8	0	3	0	0	0
5	MF	(Armenia) ARM	Hakob Hakobyan	22	2	11+6	2	1+2	0	0+2	0
6	DF	(Brazil) BRA	Ebert	5	0	2+1	0	0+2	0	0	0
7	MF	(Armenia) ARM	Aram Bareghamyan	18	0	14	0	2	0	2	0
8	MF	(Croatia) CRO	Jurica Grgec	23	0	19	0	4	0	0	0
9	FW	(Russia) RUS	Yevgeni Kobzar	24	9	18	7	4	2	1+1	0
10	FW	(Armenia) ARM	Karen Melkonyan	25	1	8+11	1	1+3	0	1+1	0
11	FW	(Russia) RUS	Igor Paderin	3	1	1	1	1+1	0	0	0
14	MF	(Nigeria) NGR	Joseph Sunday	2	0	0+2	0	0	0	0	0
15	DF	(Armenia) ARM	Hrachya Geghamyan	3	0	2+1	0	0	0	0	0
17	MF	(Russia) RUS	Taymuraz Toboyev	2	0	1+1	0	0	0	0	0
18	FW	(Venezuela) VEN	Juan Carlos Azócar	15	2	11	2	3+1	0	0	0
19	DF	(Russia) RUS	Yevgeni Osipov	6	0	4	0	2	0	0	0
21	FW	(Armenia) ARM	Erik Petrosyan	3	1	0+3	1	0	0	0	0
23	DF	(Armenia) ARM	Narek Petrosyan	16	0	8+3	0	2+1	0	2	0
24	GK	(Armenia) ARM	Arsen Beglaryan	4	0	4	0	0	0	0	0
25	DF	(Venezuela) VEN	Rubén Ramírez	16	0	13	0	3	0	0	0
28	FW	(Armenia) ARM	Abraham Portugalyan	6	1	1+4	1	0+1	0	0	0
29	MF	(Democratic Republic of the Congo) COD	Peter Mutumosi	12	0	8+2	0	2	0	0	0
30	DF	(Ghana) GHA	Edward Kpodo	19	0	16	0	1	0	2	0
33	DF	(Armenia) ARM	Arsen Sadoyan	1	0	0+1	0	0	0	0	0
39	MF	(Russia) RUS	David Papikyan	3	0	2+1	0	0	0	0	0
55	FW	(Armenia) ARM	Samvel Hakobyan	1	0	1	0	0	0	0	0
77	DF	(Armenia) ARM	Erik Simonyan	1	0	1	0	0	0	0	0
78	FW	(Armenia) ARM	Gevorg Tarakhchyan	6	0	4+1	0	1	0	0	0
88	DF	(Armenia) ARM	Vahagn Ayvazyan	5	1	2+1	1	0	0	2	0
91	MF	(Croatia) CRO	Marko Brtan	16	0	9+4	0	2+1	0	0	0
93	FW	(Russia) RUS	Semyon Sinyavsky	19	2	7+7	2	2+1	0	0+2	0
99	DF	(Armenia) ARM	Robert Darbinyan	19	0	14+1	0	4	0	0	0
Players away on loan:
Players who left Urartu during the season:
4	DF	(Armenia) ARM	Andranik Voskanyan	3	0	1	0	0	0	2	0
11	MF	(Armenia) ARM	Artak Dashyan	5	0	3	0	0	0	2	0
14	MF	(Nigeria) NGR	Adamu Abdullahi	5	0	1+3	0	0+1	0	0	0
16	MF	(Senegal) SEN	Pape Camara	15	0	3+8	0	2	0	2	0
20	MF	(Serbia) SRB	Igor Stanojević	9	0	5+2	0	0	0	2	0
55	DF	(Serbia) SRB	Miloš Nikolić	12	1	11	1	1	0	0	0
77	GK	(Armenia) ARM	Aram Ayrapetyan	12	0	9	0	1	0	2	0
78	FW	(Bosnia and Herzegovina) BIH	Aleksandar Glišić	3	0	1	0	0	0	2	0
90	FW	(Ukraine) UKR	Yevhen Budnik	11	4	8+1	4	2	0	0	0

=== Goal scorers ===
Place	Position	Nation	Number	Name	Premier League	Armenian Cup	Europa League	Total
1	FW	(Russia)	9	Yevgeni Kobzar	7	2	0	9
2	FW	(Ukraine)	90	Yevhen Budnik	4	0	0	4
3	FW	(Venezuela)	18	Juan Carlos Azócar	2	0	0	2
3	FW	(Russia)	93	Semyon Sinyavsky	2	0	0	2
3	MF	(Armenia)	5	Hakob Hakobyan	2	0	0	2
6	DF	(Armenia)	88	Vahagn Ayvazyan	1	0	0	1
6	DF	(Serbia)	55	Miloš Nikolić	1	0	0	1
6	FW	(Armenia)	10	Karen Melkonyan	1	0	0	1
6	FW	(Russia)	11	Igor Paderin	1	0	0	1
6	FW	(Armenia)	21	Erik Petrosyan	1	0	0	1
6	FW	(Armenia)	28	Abraham Portugalyan	1	0	0	1
				TOTALS	23	2	0	25

=== Clean sheets ===
Place	Position	Nation	Number	Name	Premier League	Armenian Cup	Europa League	Total
1	GK	(Armenia)	77	Aram Ayrapetyan	3	1	0	4
2	GK	(Armenia)	1	Anatoliy Ayvazov	2	1	0	3
3	GK	(Armenia)	24	Arsen Beglaryan	1	0	0	1
				TOTALS	6	2	0	8

=== Disciplinary record ===
Number	Nation	Position	Name	Premier League		Armenian Cup		Europa League		Total	
Number	Nation	Position	Name	Yellow card	Red card	Yellow card	Red card	Yellow card	Red card	Yellow card	Red card
1	(Armenia)	GK	Anatoliy Ayvazov	2	0	1	0	0	0	3	0
5	(Armenia)	MF	Hakob Hakobyan	3	1	0	0	0	0	3	1
6	(Brazil)	DF	Ebert	0	0	1	0	0	0	1	0
7	(Armenia)	MF	Aram Bareghamyan	0	0	0	0	1	0	1	0
8	(Croatia)	MF	Jurica Grgec	3	0	1	0	0	0	4	0
9	(Russia)	FW	Yevgeni Kobzar	1	0	1	0	1	0	3	0
11	(Russia)	FW	Igor Paderin	0	0	2	0	0	0	2	0
23	(Armenia)	DF	Narek Petrosyan	2	0	0	0	0	0	2	0
25	(Venezuela)	DF	Rubén Ramírez	1	0	0	0	0	0	1	0
29	(Democratic Republic of the Congo)	FW	Peter Mutumosi	2	0	1	0	0	0	3	0
30	(Ghana)	DF	Edward Kpodo	4	0	0	0	2	0	6	0
88	(Armenia)	DF	Vahagn Ayvazyan	0	0	0	0	2	0	2	0
91	(Croatia)	MF	Marko Brtan	2	0	0	0	0	0	2	0
93	(Russia)	FW	Semyon Sinyavsky	2	0	0	0	0	0	2	0
99	(Armenia)	DF	Robert Darbinyan	4	0	1	0	0	0	5	0
Players who left Urartu during the season:
4	(Armenia)	DF	Andranik Voskanyan	0	1	0	0	1	0	1	1
11	(Armenia)	MF	Artak Dashyan	0	1	0	0	1	0	1	1
16	(Senegal)	MF	Pape Camara	4	0	1	0	1	0	6	0
20	(Serbia)	MF	Igor Stanojević	1	0	0	0	0	0	1	0
55	(Serbia)	DF	Miloš Nikolić	5	0	0	0	0	0	5	0
77	(Armenia)	GK	Aram Ayrapetyan	2	0	0	0	0	0	2	0
90	(Ukraine)	FW	Yevhen Budnik	1	0	0	0	0	0	1	0
			TOTALS	38	3	9	0	9	0	56	3
