= Rubén Ramírez =

Rubén Ramírez may refer to:

- Rubén Ramírez Lezcano (born 1966), Paraguayan politician
- Rubén Ramírez Hidalgo (born 1978), Spanish tennis player
- Rubén Ramírez Mateo (born 1965), Peruvian politician, minister of the environment in 2021–2022
- Rubén Ramírez (footballer, born 1982), Argentine footballer
- Rubén Ramírez (footballer, born 1995), Venezuelan footballer
