= Bogdan Miličić =

Serbian footballer

Personal information
- Full name: Bogdan Miličić
- Date of birth: January 6, 1989 (age 37)
- Place of birth: Užice, SFR Yugoslavia
- Height: 1.74 m (5 ft 8 1/2 in)
- Position: Right-back

Team information
- Current team: Jedinstvo Užice
- Number: 10

Youth career
- Red Star Belgrade

Senior career*
Years	Team	Apps	(Gls)
2007–2008	Zlatibor Voda	4	(0)
2008–2009	Sloboda Užice	29	(0)
2009–2013	Borac Čačak	64	(0)
2013–2017	Sloboda Užice	83	(7)
2017–2019	Zlatibor Čajetina		
2019–2020	Shirak	26	(0)
2020–2021	Zlatibor Čajetina	15	(0)
2021–2023	Sloboda Užice	75	(0)
2023–	Jedinstvo Užice	31	(0)
- * Club domestic league appearances and goals as of 19:57, 22 June 2024 (UTC)

Bogdan Miličić (Serbian Cyrillic: Богдан Миличић; born January 6, 1989) is a Serbian football player who plays for FK Jedinstvo Užice.

== Statistics ==
As of 27 May 2017

Club	Season	League		Cup		Continental		Total	
Club	Season	Apps	Goals	Apps	Goals	Apps	Goals	Apps	Goals
Zlatibor Voda	2007–08	4	0	0	0	0	0	4	0
Sloboda Užice	2008–09	29	0	0	0	0	0	29	0
Borac Čačak	2009–10	9	0	0	0	0	0	9	0
Borac Čačak	2010–11	19	0	1	0	0	0	20	0
Borac Čačak	2011–12	21	0	6	0	0	0	27	0
Borac Čačak	2012–13	15	0	0	0	0	0	15	0
Borac Čačak	Total	64	0	7	0	0	0	71	0
Sloboda Užice	2013–14	6	0	1	0	0	0	7	0
Sloboda Užice	2014–15	23	1	2	0	0	0	25	1
Sloboda Užice	2015–16	27	3	0	0	0	0	27	3
Sloboda Užice	2016–17	27	3	4	0	0	0	31	3
Sloboda Užice	Total	83	7	7	0	0	0	90	7
Career total		180	7	14	0	0	0	194	7
