= Semyon Sinyavsky =

Russian footballer

Semyon Sinyavskiy
Personal information
- Full name: Semyon Olegovich Sinyavskiy
- Date of birth: 30 September 1993 (age 33)
- Place of birth: Sergiyev Posad, Russia
- Height: 1.82 m (6 ft 0 in)
- Position: Forward

Youth career
- 1998–2009: Yunost Moskvy-Spartak-2 Moscow
- 2009–2010: Torpedo Moscow
- 2010–2011: Lokomotiv Moscow

Senior career*
Years	Team	Apps	(Gls)
2012–2013	Lokomotiv-2 Moscow	26	(0)
2014–2015	Chernomorets Novorossiysk	23	(12)
2016	Khimki	9	(0)
2016–2017	Saturn Ramenskoye	18	(6)
2017–2019	Armavir	62	(14)
2019–2020	Urartu	14	(2)
2020–2021	Kuban-Holding Pavlovskaya	15	(4)

International career
2010–2011	Russia U-18	10	(2)
2012	Russia U-19	3	(2)
2013	Russia U-20	1	(0)
- * Club domestic league appearances and goals

Semyon Olegovich Sinyavskiy (Russian: Семен Олегович Синявский; born 30 September 1993) is a Russian former football forward.

== Club career ==
He made his debut in the Russian Second Division for FC Lokomotiv-2 Moscow on 23 July 2012 in a game against FC Znamya Truda Orekhovo-Zuyevo.

He made his Russian Football National League debut for FC Armavir on 17 July 2018 in a game against FC SKA-Khabarovsk.

On 1 July 2019, he signed a contract with Armenian club FC Banants.
