= Pape Abdou Camara =

Senegalese footballer

Pape Camara
Personal information
- Full name: Pape Abdou Camara
- Date of birth: 24 September 1991 (age 35)
- Place of birth: Dakar, Senegal
- Height: 1.85 m (6 ft 1 in)
- Position: Defensive midfielder

Youth career
- Étoile Lusitana

Senior career*
Years	Team	Apps	(Gls)
2009	Étoile Lusitana		
2010–2012	Standard Liège	15	(0)
2010–2011	→ STVV (loan)	11	(2)
2012–2015	Valenciennes	25	(1)
2012–2015	Valenciennes B	21	(2)
2015–2017	RFC Seraing	31	(5)
2018–2019	Urartu	33	(1)
2020–2021	Alashkert	25	(1)
2022–2023	Al-Qous		
2023	Bisha		
- * Club domestic league appearances and goals as of 18:12, 4 August 2021 (UTC)

Pape Abdou Camara (born 24 September 1991) is a Senegalese footballer who plays as a defensive midfielder.

== Career ==
Camara began his career in the Academy of Étoile Lusitana. On 17 January 2010, Standard Liège signed the Senegalese midfielder from Etoile Lusitana until June 2011. On 16 May 2010, Standard Liège confirmed he would leave the club in summer 2010 for Sint-Truidense VV. In 2012, he joined Valenciennes.

=== Armenia ===
On 29 August 2018, Camara signed for Armenian Premier League club Banants. On 2 August 2019, FC Banants was officially renamed Urartu FC. On 11 December 2019, FC Alashkert announced the signing of Camara from FC Urartu.

=== Saudi Arabia ===
On 5 August 2022, Camara joined Saudi Arabian club Al-Qous. On 24 January 2023, Camara joined Bisha.

== Career statistics ==
=== Club ===
As of match played 10 May 2021

Appearances and goals by club, season and competition
Club	Season	League			National Cup		League Cup		Continental		Other		Total	
Club	Season	Division	Apps	Goals	Apps	Goals	Apps	Goals	Apps	Goals	Apps	Goals	Apps	Goals
Valenciennes	2011–12	Ligue 1	11	0	2	0	0	0	-		-		13	0
Valenciennes	2012–13	Ligue 1	6	0	0	0	0	0	-		-		6	0
Valenciennes	2013–14	Ligue 1	0	0	0	0	0	0	-		-		0	0
Valenciennes	2014–15	Ligue 2	8	1	0	0	1	0	-		-		9	1
Valenciennes	Total		25	1	2	0	1	0	-	-	-	-	28	1
RFC Seraing	2015–16	Belgian Second Division	13	2	0	0	-		-		-		13	2
RFC Seraing	2016–17	Belgian First Amateur Division	18	3	0	0	-		-		-		18	3
RFC Seraing	Total		31	5	0	0	-	-	-	-	-	-	31	5
Urartu	2018–19	Armenian Premier League	22	1	3	0	-		0 (Note: Appearances in the UEFA Europa League)	0	-		25	1
Urartu	2019–20	Armenian Premier League	11	0	2	0	-		2	0	-		15	0
Urartu	Total		33	1	5	0	-	-	2	0	-	-	40	1
Alashkert	2019–20	Armenian Premier League	10	1	0	0	-		0	0	0 (Note: Appearances in the Armenian Supercup)	0	10	1
Alashkert	2020–21	Armenian Premier League	15	0	4	1	-		1	0	-		20	1
Alashkert	Total		25	1	4	1	-	-	1	0	0	0	30	2
Career total			114	8	11	1	1	0	3	0	0	0	129	9

== Honours ==
Standard Liège

- Belgian Cup: 2010–11
