= Robert Darbinyan =

Russian-born, Armenian footballer

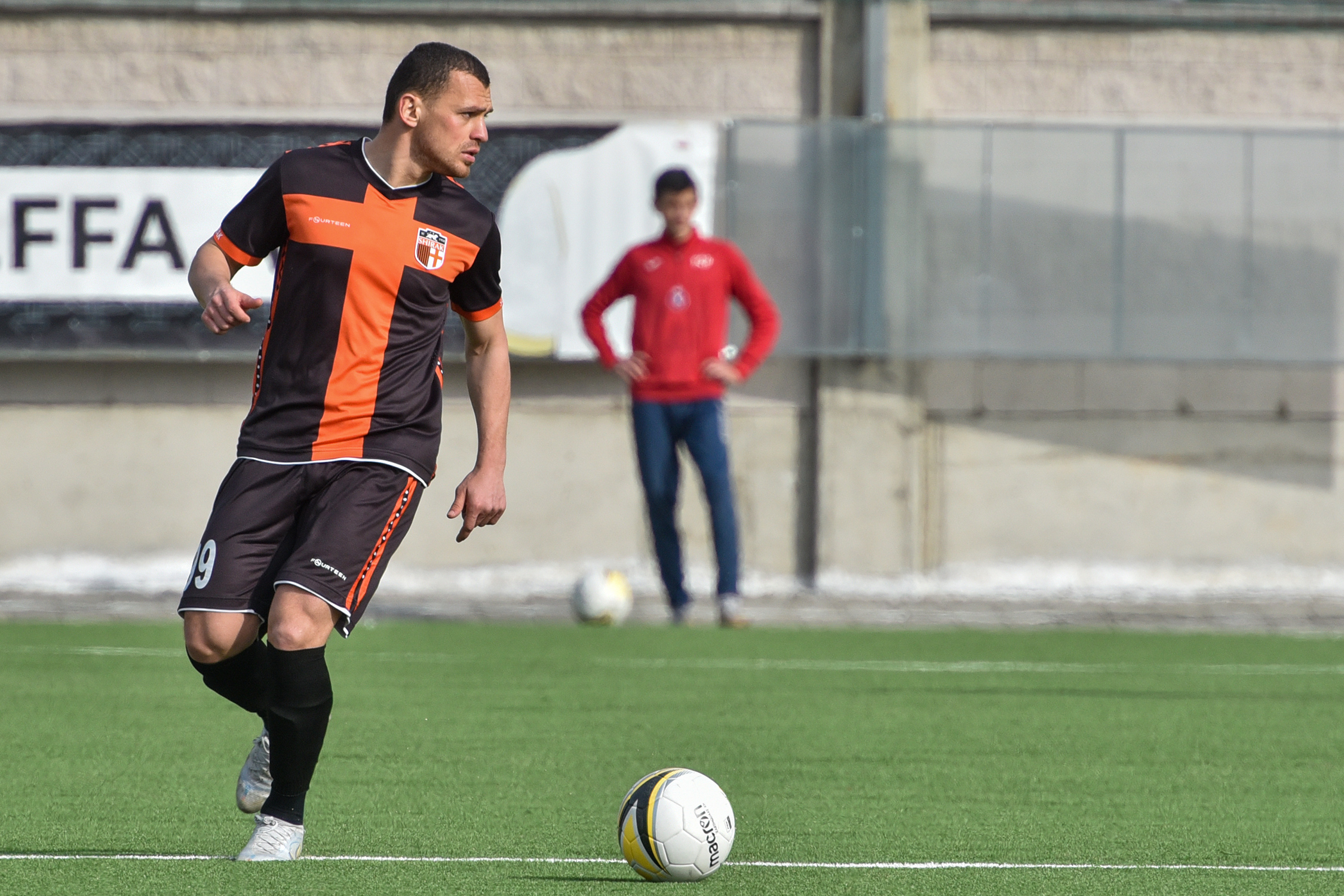

Personal information
- Date of birth: 4 October 1995 (age 31)
- Place of birth: Tolyatti, Russia
- Height: 1.71 m (5 ft 7 1/2 in)
- Position: Defender

Team information
- Current team: Pyunik
- Number: 88

Youth career
- –2011: Konoplyov football academy

Senior career*
Years	Team	Apps	(Gls)
2012	Akademiya Tolyatti		
2013–2015	KS Samara II		
2014–2015	→ Shirak (loan)	21	(1)
2016–2018	Shirak	46	(0)
2018–2019	Ararat-Armenia	2	(0)
2019–2021	Urartu	26	(0)
2021	Pyunik	0	(0)
2021–2023	Ararat	36	(0)
2023–2026	Shirak	153	(3)
2026–	Pyunik	8	(0)

International career^{‡}
2011	Armenia U17	4	(0)
2013	Armenia U19	2	(0)
2018–	Armenia	1	(0)
Medal record
Shirak SC
Runner-up	Armenian Premier League	2015–16
Winner	Armenian Cup	2016–17
Winner	Armenian Supercup	2017
- * Club domestic league appearances and goals as of 18 June 2026 ‡ National team caps and goals as of 20:44, 30 July 2018 (UTC)

Robert Darbinyan (Armenian: Ռոբերտ ԴԱՐԲԻՆՅԱՆ, Russian: Дарбинян Роберт Меликович; born 4 October 1995) is a Russian-born, Armenian footballer who plays for Pyunik.

== Career ==
On 14 January 2019, Darbinyan left Ararat-Armenia by mutual consent. He joined Banants on 16 January 2019.

== Career statistics ==
=== Club ===
As of match played 3 October 2018.

Club	Season	League			Cup		Continental		Other		Total	
Club	Season	Division	Apps	Goals	Apps	Goals	Apps	Goals	Apps	Goals	Apps	Goals
Shirak (loan)	2014–15	Armenian Premier League	21	1	1 (Note: Appearances in the Armenian Cup)	0	1 (Note: Appearances in 2014–15 UEFA Europa League qualifying)	0	0	0	23	1
Shirak	2015–16	Armenian Premier League	8	0	0	0	–		0	0	8	0
Shirak	2016–17	Armenian Premier League	12	0	2	0	4 (Note: Appearances in 2016–17 UEFA Europa League qualifying)	0	0	0	18	0
Shirak	2017–18	Armenian Premier League	26	0	3	0	2 (Note: Appearances in 2017–18 UEFA Europa League qualifying)	0	1 (Note: Appearances in the Armenian Supercup)	0	32	0
Shirak	Total		67	1	6	0	7	0	1	0	81	1
Ararat-Armenia	2018–19	Armenian Premier League	2	0	2	0	–		–		4	0
Banants/Urartu	2018–19	Armenian Premier League	11	0	1	0	0 (Note: Appearances in 2018–19 UEFA Europa League qualifying)	0	–		12	0
Banants/Urartu	2019–20	Armenian Premier League	15	0	4	0	0 (Note: Appearances in 2019–20 UEFA Europa League qualifying)	0	–		19	0
Banants/Urartu	Total		26	0	5	0	0	0	-	-	31	0
Career total			95	1	13	0	7	0	1	0	116	1

=== International ===
As of matches played 30 July 2018.

National team	Year	Apps	Goals
Armenia	2018	1	0
Total		1	0
