= Rubén Ramírez (footballer, born 1995) =

Venezuelan association football player

Personal information
- Full name: Rubén Alejandro Ramírez dos Ramos
- Date of birth: 18 October 1995 (age 31)
- Place of birth: Caracas, Venezuela
- Height: 1.81 m (5 ft 11 in)
- Position: Centre-back

Team information
- Current team: Al-Shorta
- Number: 4

Youth career
- Caracas

Senior career*
Years	Team	Apps	(Gls)
2012–2013	Caracas	2	(0)
2013–2015	Carabobo	11	(0)
2015–2016	Estudiantes de Caracas	5	(0)
2016–2017	La Guaira	0	(0)
2017–2018	Anzoátegui	34	(0)
2018–2019	Atlético Venezuela	14	(0)
2018–2019	→ Fortuna Sittard (loan)	7	(0)
2019–2020	Urartu	13	(0)
2021–2023	Monagas	55	(1)
2024	Cusco	33	(0)
2025	Bolívar	7	(0)
2026	Universidad Central	4	(0)
2026–	Al-Shorta		

International career^{‡}
2015	Venezuela U20	3	(0)
2014	Venezuela U21	2	(0)
2024–	Venezuela	3	(1)
- * Club domestic league appearances and goals as of 4 July 2026 ‡ National team caps and goals as of 19 November 2024

Rubén Alejandro Ramírez dos Ramos (born 18 October 1995) is a Venezuelan professional footballer who plays as a centre-back for Al-Shorta.

== Professional career ==
Ramírez spent most of his early career playing in various Venezuelan teams, before joining Fortuna Sittard on loan in 2018. He made his professional debut with Fortuna Sittard in a 3–0 Eredivisie win over PEC Zwolle on 4 November 2018.

On 28 August 2019, Ramírez signed for Urartu.

== International career ==
Ramírez was born in Venezuela and is of Portuguese descent. He represented the Venezuela U21s at the 2014 CAC Games, and the Venezuela U20s at the 2015 South American U-20 Championship.

== Career statistics ==
=== International ===
As of match played 19 November 2024

National team	Year	Apps	Goals
Venezuela	2024	3	1
Total		3	1

Scores and results list Venezuela's goal tally first, score column indicates score after each Ramírez goal.

List of international goals scored by Rubén Ramírez
No.	Date	Venue	Opponent	Score	Result	Competition
1	19 November 2024	Estadio Nacional Julio Martínez Prádanos, Santiago, Chile	Chile	1–2	2–2	2026 FIFA World Cup qualification

== Honours ==
Caracas

- Copa Venezuela (1): 2013
