= Yerevan Football Academy =

Football training school in Yerevan, Armenia

Technical Center-Academy of the Football Federation of Armenia
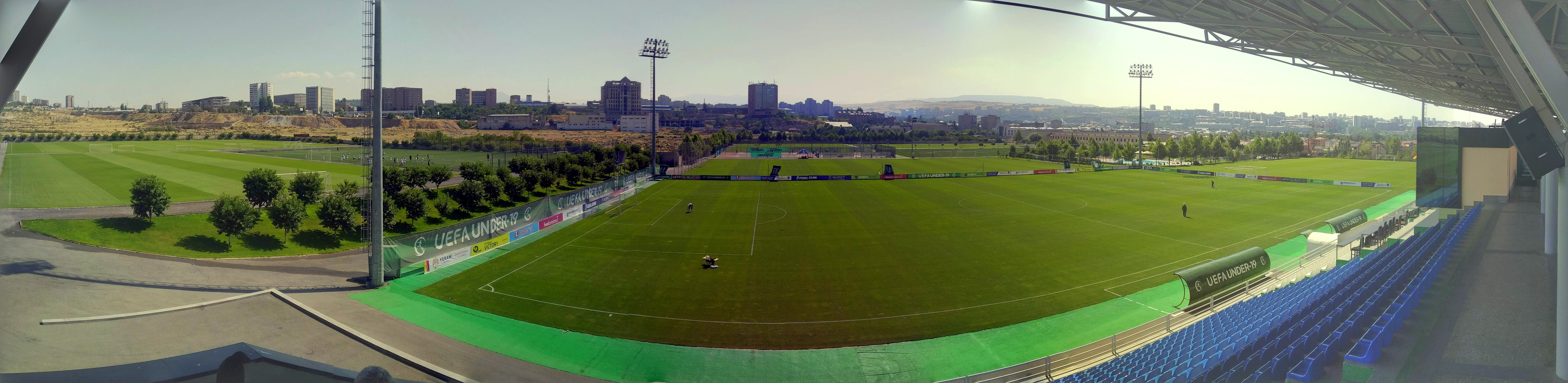
- Panoramic view of the academy
- Interactive map of Technical Center-Academy of the Football Federation of Armenia
- Address: Acharyan str. 35/31, Avan District, Yerevan, Armenia
- Coordinates: 40°13′15″N 44°33′24″E
- Owner: Football Federation of Armenia
- Capacity: 1428
- Type: Football training facility

Construction
- Built: 2007–2010
- Opened: 1 September 2010

Tenant
- Armenia national football team (training) (2010–present)

Website
- Official website

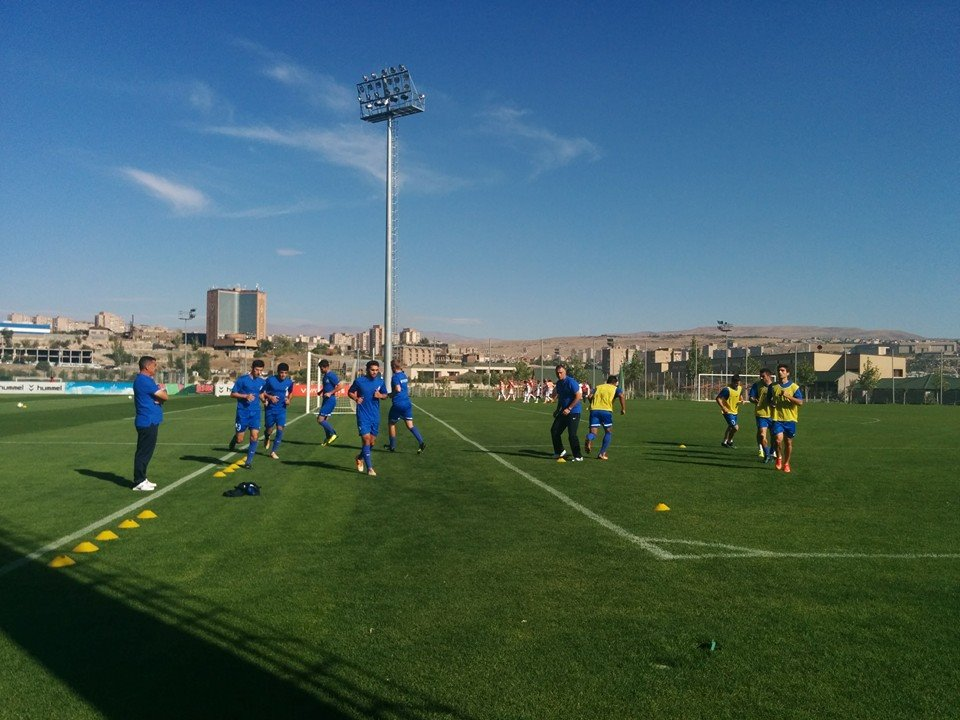
Yerevan Football Academy

Officially, the Technical Center-Academy of the Football Federation of Armenia (Armenian: Հայաստանի ֆուտբոլի ֆեդերացիայի Տեխնիկական կենտրոն-ակադեմիա), commonly known as the Yerevan Football Academy or Avan Football Academy, is a modern football training school located in Yerevan, the capital of Armenia.

The purpose of the centre is to be the base for all coaching and development work undertaken by the Football Federation of Armenia, and the training and preparation ground for all of the Armenia national football teams.

== Overview ==
The construction of the academy was launched in late 2007 by the Football Federation of Armenia. On 1 September 2010, the complex was officially opened by the President of Armenia Serzh Sargsyan, the UEFA President Michel Platini and the FFA President Ruben Hayrapetyan.

At its inauguration, the academy was home to five regular football training pitches, four tennis courts, indoor and outdoor swimming pools, the indoor sports arena and the hotel complex. Between 2013 and 2016, the academy was redeveloped and expanded to include five additional football training pitches, including the main stadium.

Currently, the Yerevan Football Academy is the largest football training complex in Transcaucasia. It is considered one of the most developed training centres in Europe.

== Structure ==
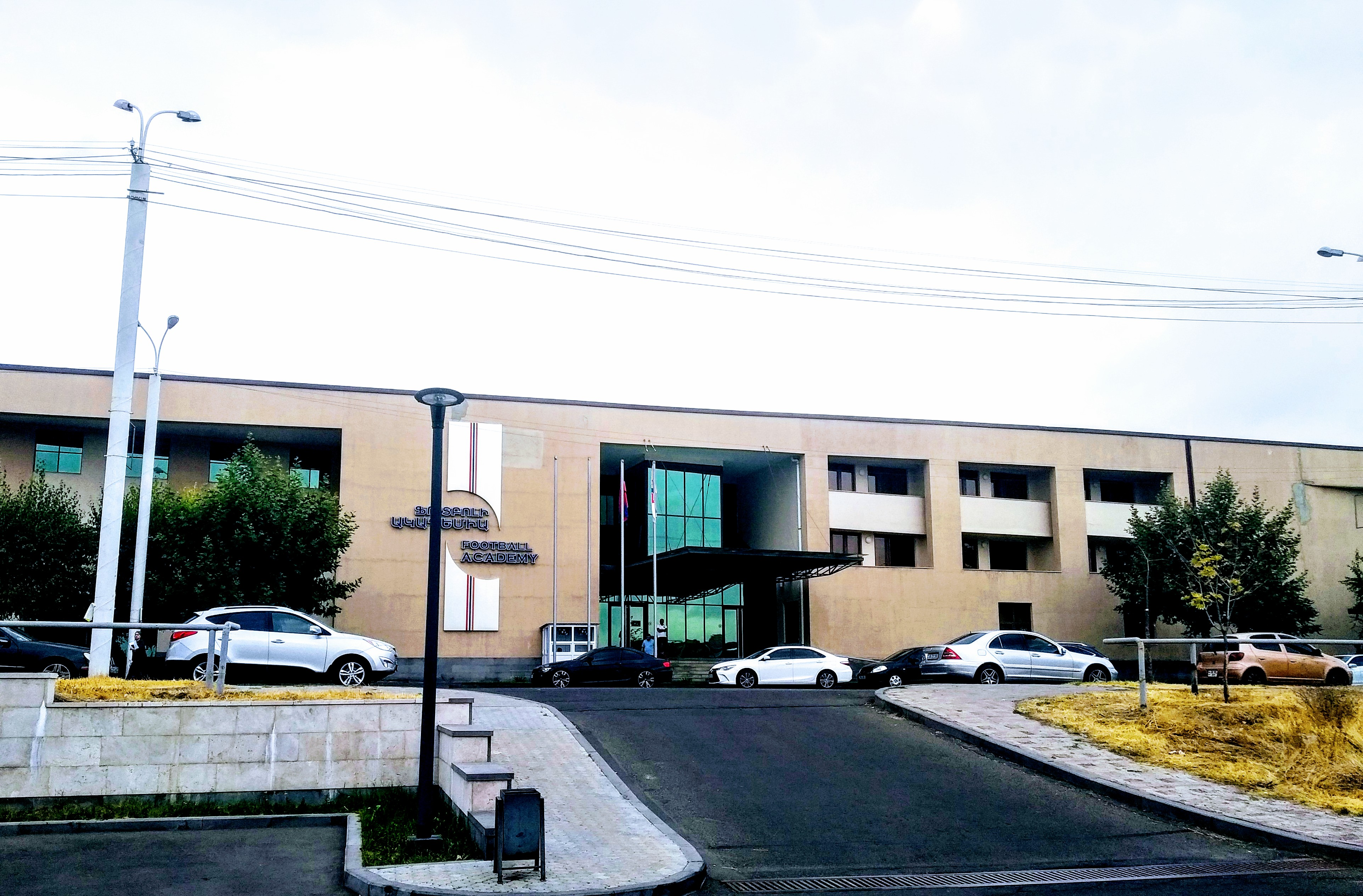
The administrative building

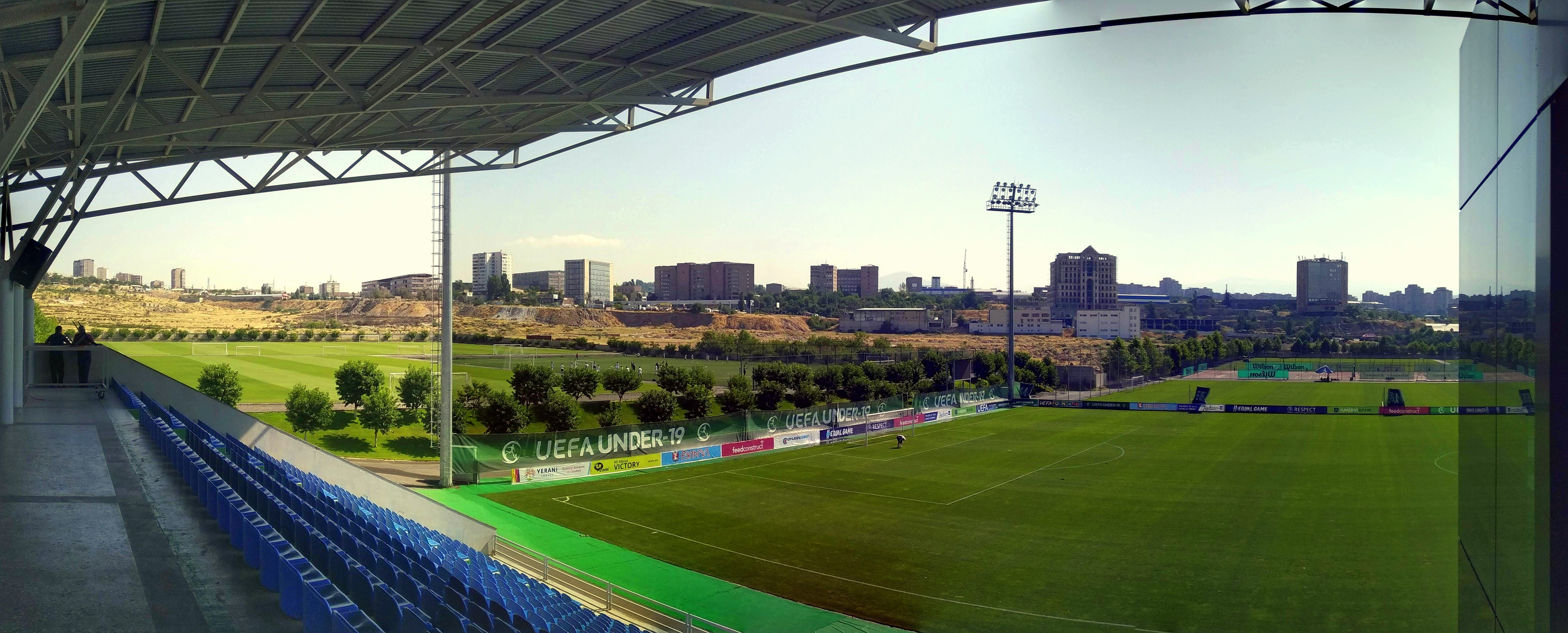
The main stadium and surrounding training pitches

Occupying an area of 120,000 m^{2}, the complex is currently housing the following structures:

- Yerevan Football Academy Stadium, with a capacity of 1428 seats, opened on 29 April 2013. It was one of the stadiums that hosted the 2019 UEFA European Under-19 Championship matches.
- Seven natural-grass and two artificial turf regular-sized football training pitches, mainly used by the Football Federation of Armenia as a training base for the Armenia national football team as well as the youth football teams. The centre is also used by many Yerevan-based football clubs. All of the training pitches meet the professional standards set by FIFA and UEFA.
- Indoor sports arena with 500 seats, used for futsal, basketball, volleyball and handball.
- Fitness centre and gymnasium, including sauna, jacuzzi and a recreation centre.
- Four regular outdoor hardcourts.
- Indoor and outdoor swimming pools, each having a size of 25x11 meters. The outdoor pool is served by a poolside restaurant and bar.
- Dining hall and bar with a capacity to serve up to 130 people.
- Hotel complex with 49 single and double guest rooms.
- Billiards hall.
- Conference hall.

== Gallery ==
Yerevan Football Academy

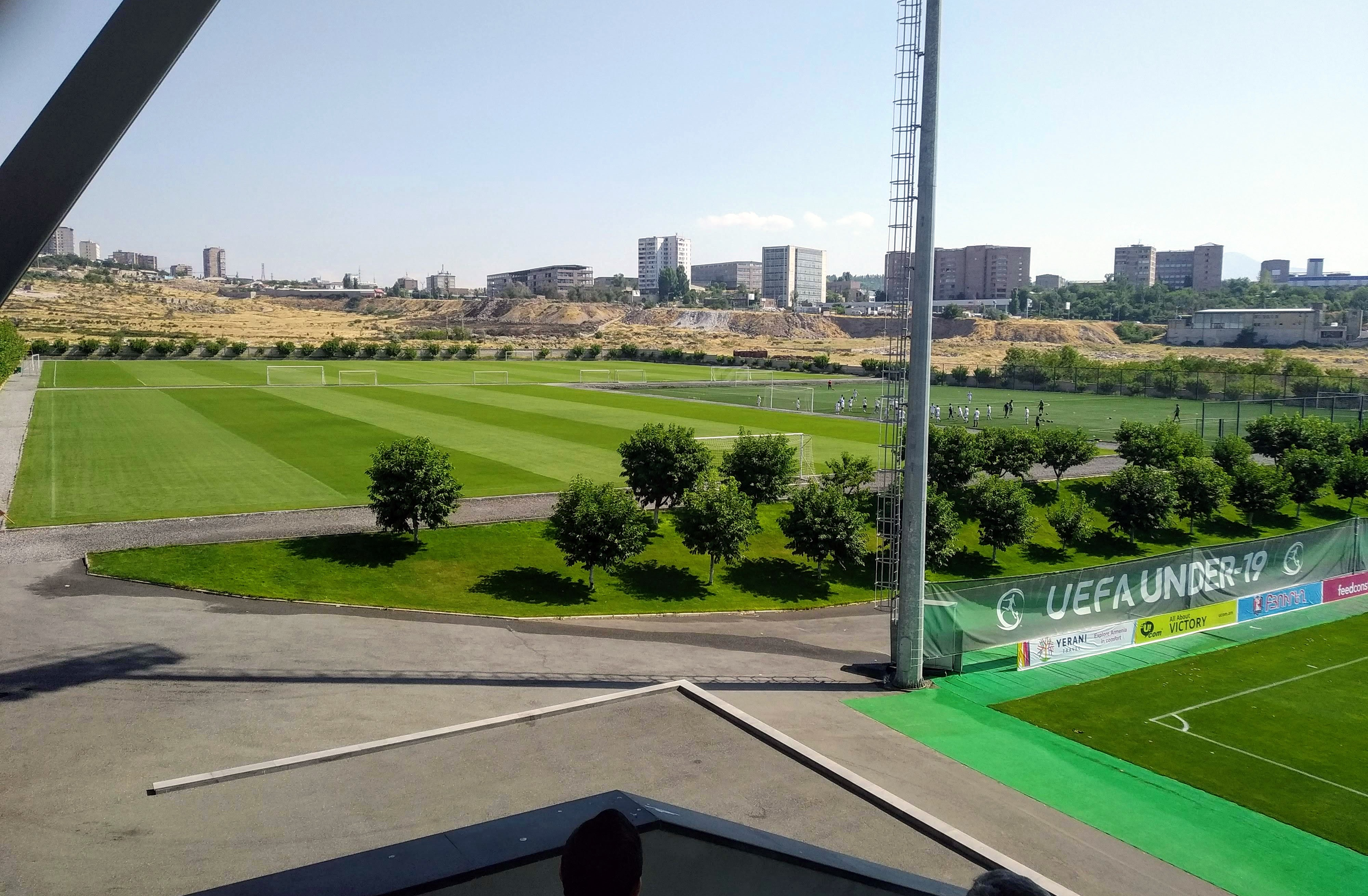
Natural grass pitches and an artificial pitch

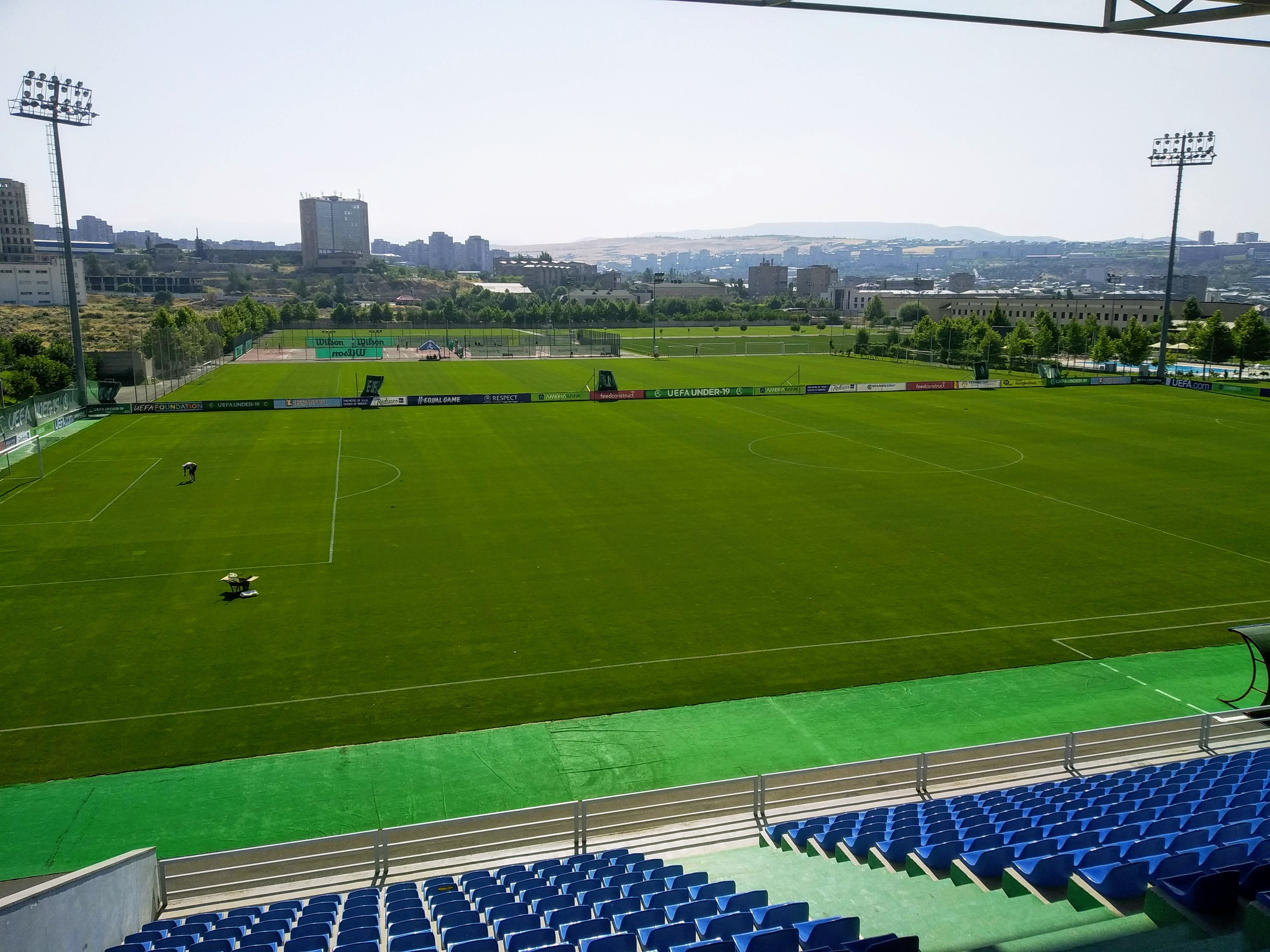
Pitches and tennis courts near the main stadium

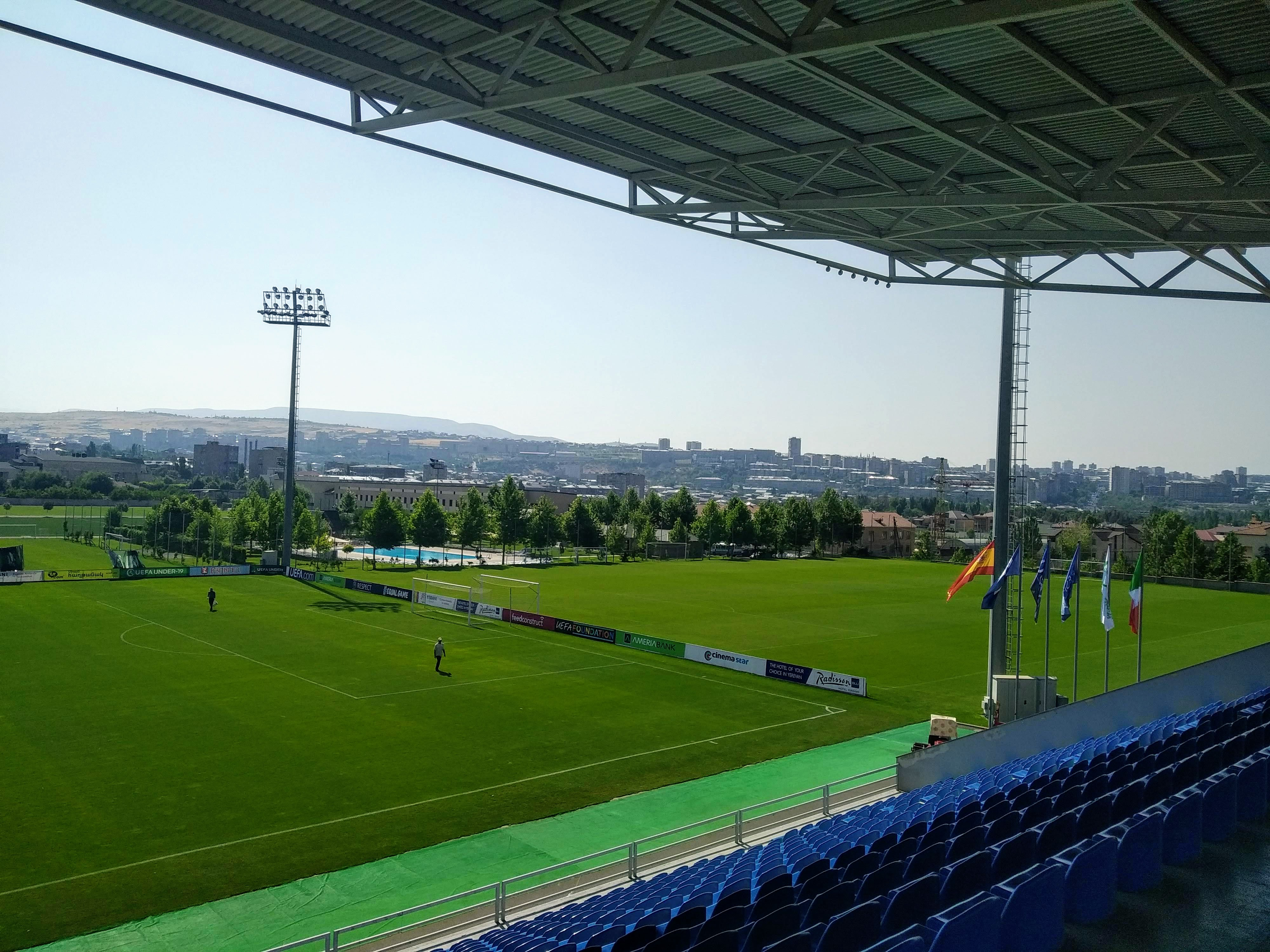
A natural grass pitch and the swimming pool near the main stadium

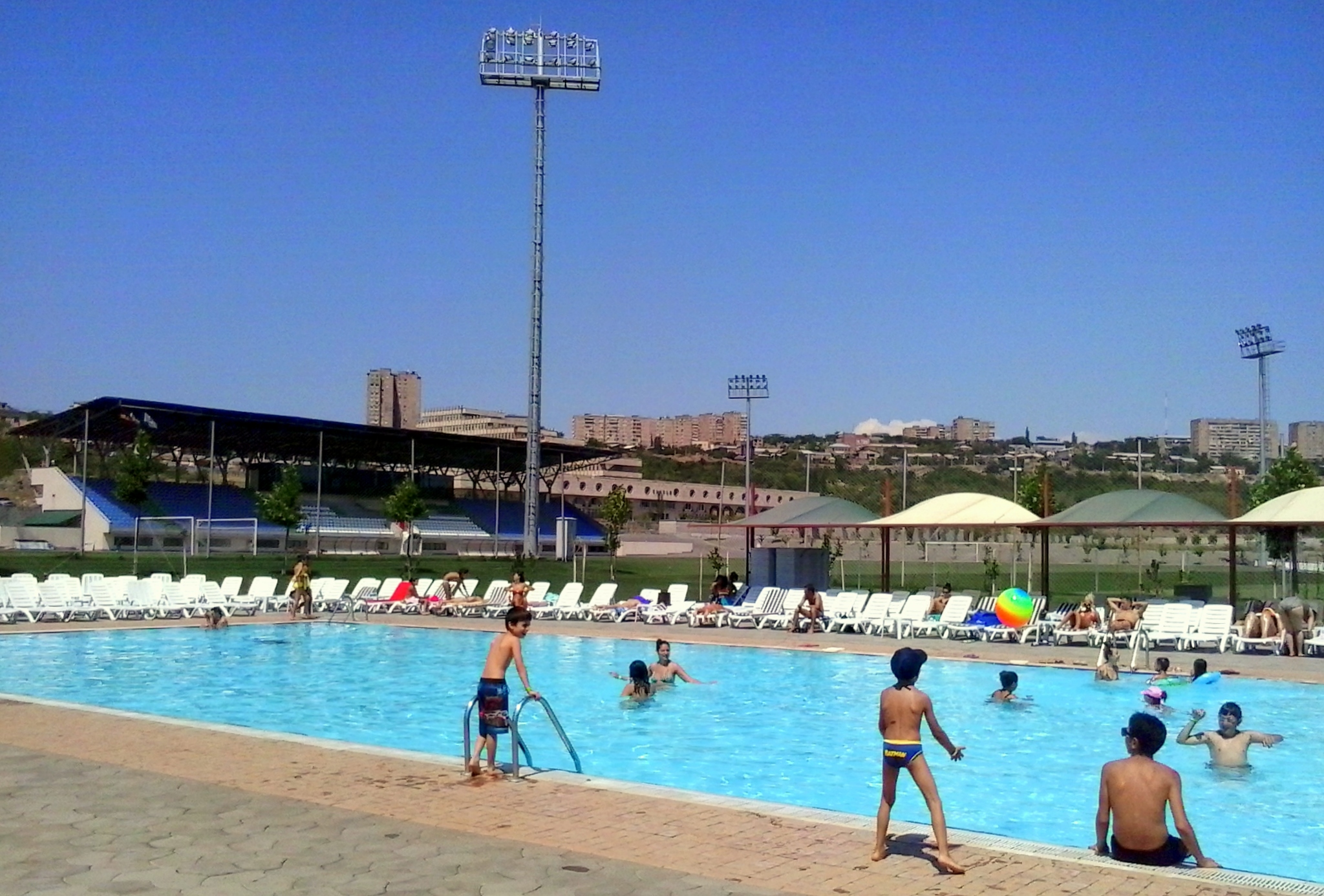
The swimming pool

== See also ==
- Football in Armenia
